= Non-Sport Update =

US magazine

- Editor-in-Chief: Alan Biegel
- Categories: Entertainment
- Frequency: Bi-Monthly
- Publisher: Beckett Media
- First issue: Oct/Dec 1990
- Final issue: Dec '25/Jan '26
- Country: U.S.
- Based in: Dallas, TX
- Language: English
- ISSN: 1059-8383

Non-Sport Update (sometimes abbreviated as NSU) was a magazine founded by "Roxanne Toser Non-Sport Enterprises, Inc." for collectors of non-sport and entertainment trading cards. Subjects that appear on these types of trading cards are television and movie properties, comic book characters, music icons, product parodies, and many other topics. In February 2016, Non-Sport Update was acquired by Beckett Media.

The first edition of Non-Sport Update was published in 1991. The magazine was published quarterly through 1993. From 1994 through January 2026, Non-Sport Update was published bimonthly in January, March, May, July, September, and November. The headquarters of the magazine was in Dallas, TX.

The magazine ceased publication in December 2025

== Contents ==
Non-Sport Update magazine included articles about upcoming trading card products and vintage series. Regular columns include Non-Sport Notes, Promo Column, Cards Online, Non-Sport University, Beyond Non-Sport, and New & Noteworthy. Older issues included New Card Review and Finders Keepers. Each issue includes a price guide with price values for cards from the 1800s through today. One of Non-Sport Update's most popular feature is its included promotional trading cards. The magazine has included over 400 different "promo cards" since its inception.

== Variant issues ==
Variant issues had a staple of Non-Sport Update publishing schedule since the first one was published in 2001. These issues featured a unique cover and exclusive promotional trading card and are generally published in conjunction with hobby trade shows. Variant issues have been produced in conjunction with many Comic-Con International shows promoting trading card series from Inkworks (four of which have contained Buffy the Vampire Slayer covers) and Upper Deck for their 2008 Marvel Masterpieces series.

== Family run ==
NSU has been a family-run business. Roxanne Toser served as publisher, Marlin Toser as managing editor, and Harris Toser as production manager. The current editor-in-chief is Alan Biegel. Previous editor-in-chiefs have been Christopher Benjamin, Russell Roberts, Nick Portantiere, and Bernie Mertes.

== Other publications ==
Two books were published by Non-Sport Update: Promo Card Encyclopedia & Price Guide and The Encyclopedia of Non-Sport & Entertainment Trading Cards. Both books were written by Todd Jordan. Jordan's Promo Card Encyclopedia was published prior to the first publication with Non-Sport Update in 2005. Updated versions of both books are expected in the near future.

== Trade shows ==
When the Toser family owned Non-Sport Update, the magazine organized and promoted the Philly Non-Sports Card Show. After the publication was acquired by Beckett Media, the show became an independent event once again operated by the Toser family. The show is held twice per year in Oaks, Pennsylvania, and has run continuously since the 1980s. It was previously managed by Frank and Phyllis Reighter. In 2012, Non-Sport Update also organized Pop Art Con, an artists’ show held in Fort Washington, Pennsylvania.

== NSU Card Talk ==
Non-Sport Update hosted an online forum for collectors since 1999. The forum is one of the most popular trading card destinations online, especially for the non-sport/entertainment trading card niche.

== NSU Magazine Cards ==
List of Cards in Every NSU Magazine
Vol. No.	Issue Date	Promo Card	Details ([L] = NSU Logo)	Manufacturer
Vol. 1, No. 1	Oct/Dec 1990	[No cards]		-
Vol. 2, No. 1	Jan/Mar 1991	[No cards]		-
Vol. 2, No. 2	Apr/Jun 1991	[No cards]		-
Vol. 2, No. 3	Jul/Sep 1991	[No cards]		-
Vol. 2, No. 4	Oct/Dec 1991	[No cards]		-
Vol. 3, No. 1	Jan/Mar 1992	[No cards]		-
Vol. 3, No. 2	Apr/Jun 1992	Star Trek: The Next Generation [Given to Subscribers Only]		
Vol. 3, No. 3	Jul/Sep 1992	[No cards]		-
Vol. 3, No. 4	Oct/Dec 1992	1 and 2 Garfield 2-card panel		SkyBox International
Vol. 4, No. 1	Jan/Mar 1993	[No cards]		-
Vol. 4, No. 2	Apr/Jun 1993	Unnumbered 2 different Star Wars Galaxy 1 cards (Jabba the Hutt and Princess Leia)		Topps
Vol. 4, No. 3	Jul/Sep 1993	Unnumbered 1993 Star Trek Master Series Card		SkyBox International
Vol. 4, No. 3	Jul/Sep 1993	Unnumbered Jurassic Park card		Topps
Vol. 4, No. 4	Oct/Dec 1993	Unnumbered Creators Universe cards were randomly inserted [may include signature variant]		Dynamic Entertainment
Vol. 4, No. 4	Oct/Dec 1993	Unnumbered Batman The Animated Series, Series Two		Topps
Vol. 4, No. 4	Oct/Dec 1993	Unnumbered Funimals cards were randomly inserted		Mike Aloisi
Vol. 5, No. 1	Jan/Feb 1994	Unnumbered Sanjullian		FPG
Vol. 5, No. 1	Jan/Feb 1994	Prototype Pin-Up Girls II		21st Century Archives
Vol. 5, No. 1	Jan/Feb 1994	Unnumbered John Berkey Card		FPG
Vol. 5, No. 1	Jan/Feb 1994	P5 Saved by the Bell and other cards were randomly inserted		Pacific Trading Cards
Vol. 5, No. 2	Mar/Apr 1994	P2 Star Wars Galaxy 2		Topps
Vol. 5, No. 2	Mar/Apr 1994	Unnumbered Universal Monsters Illustrated Card		Topps
Vol. 5, No. 2	Mar/Apr 1994	Unnumbered Keith Parkinson Card		FPG
Vol. 5, No. 2	Mar/Apr 1994	Unnumbered Richard Hescox Card		FPG
Vol. 5, No. 2	Mar/Apr 1994	Unnumbered Mike Ploog Card		FPG
Vol. 5, No. 3	May/Jun 1994	Unnumbered Mike Ploog Card		FPG
Vol. 5, No. 3	May/Jun 1994	N1 DC Master Series	NSU Exclusive [L]	SkyBox International
Vol. 5, No. 4	Jul/Aug 1994	Unnumbered Mars Attacks Archives Card		Topps
Vol. 5, No. 4	Jul/Aug 1994	Unnumbered Mars Attacks Homage Card		Non-Sport Update
Vol. 5, No. 4	Jul/Aug 1994	Unnumbered Ken Kelly Collection No.2 Card		FPG
Vol. 5, No. 4	Jul/Aug 1994	Unnumbered 1994 Star Trek Master Series Card		SkyBox International
Vol. 5, No. 5	Sep/Oct 1994	P2 Monty Python's Flying Circus		Cornerstone Communications
Vol. 5, No. 5	Sep/Oct 1994	Unnumbered Bernie Wrightson 2 Card		FPG
Vol. 5, No. 5	Sep/Oct 1994	P3 Chris Achilleos 2		FPG
Vol. 5, No. 5	Sep/Oct 1994	P2 Aliens Predator Universe		Topps
Vol. 5, No. 5	Sep/Oct 1994	Unnumbered Superman Platinum Series card, one of several different panels inserted		SkyBox International
Vol. 5, No. 6	Nov/Dec 1994	1 of 4, 2 of 4, 3 of 4, 4 of 4 Popeye were randomly inserted		Card Creations
Vol. 5, No. 6	Nov/Dec 1994	Unnumbered Tekno Comics Phonecard		Big Entertainment
Vol. 5, No. 6	Nov/Dec 1994	Unnumbered Joe Jusko's Edgar Rice Burroughs Collection Card	NSU Exclusive [L]	FPG
Vol. 5, No. 6	Nov/Dec 1994	SWP1 Star Wars Widevision		Topps
Vol. 6, No. 1	Feb/Mar 1995	NSU1 Lois & Clark	NSU Exclusive	SkyBox International
Vol. 6, No. 1	Feb/Mar 1995	Not known Vampir Theatre regular card or maxi card randomly inserted		High Heels Productions
Vol. 6, No. 1	Feb/Mar 1995	Unnumbered 1995 Flair Marvel 4-card panel		Fleer
Vol. 6, No. 2	Apr/May 1995	Unnumbered Magic The Gathering: Ice Age Cards 2 different were inserted		Wizards of the Coast
Vol. 6, No. 2	Apr/May 1995	N1 Star Trek: Voyager		SkyBox International
Vol. 6, No. 2	Apr/May 1995	Unnumbered Marvel Metal 4-card panel		Fleer
Vol. 6, No. 2	Apr/May 1995	Unnumbered Fleer Ultra Reboot 9-card panel		Fleer
Vol. 6, No. 3	Jun/Jul 1995	#5 of 5 Bob Marley	NSU Exclusive [L]	Island Vibes Publishing
Vol. 6, No. 3	Jun/Jul 1995	#0 Native Americans	NSU Exclusive [L]	Bon Air Collectibles
Vol. 6, No. 3	Jun/Jul 1995	Not known Slug milk cap random regular production run caps were inserted		Pinnacle
Vol. 6, No. 3	Jun/Jul 1995	Unnumbered Batman Forever Fleer Ultra 4-card panel		Fleer
Vol. 6, No. 4	Aug/Sep 1995	P3 Star Wars Galaxy 3	NSU Exclusive	Topps
Vol. 6, No. 4	Aug/Sep 1995	P2 Empire Strikes Back Widevision		Topps
Vol. 6, No. 4	Aug/Sep 1995	Unnumbered Fleer '95 Ultra Fox Kids Network 9-card panel		Fleer
Vol. 6, No. 4	Aug/Sep 1995	Unnumbered Fleer Ultra Waterworld 4-card panel		Fleer
Vol. 6, No. 5	Oct/Nov 1995	Promo 1 The Monkees		Cornerstone Communications
Vol. 6, No. 5	Oct/Nov 1995	N1 Creator's Master Series	NSU Exclusive [L]	SkyBox International
Vol. 6, No. 5	Oct/Nov 1995	P6 The X-Files		Topps
Vol. 6, No. 5	Oct/Nov 1995	1 Edenquest/Pamela Anderson	NSU Exclusive [L]	High Heels Productions
Vol. 6, No. 6	Dec 1995/Jan 1996	PROTOTYPE Ace Ventura When Nature Calls		Donruss
Vol. 6, No. 6	Dec 1995/Jan 1996	2 of 3 Gone With The Wind		DuoCards
Vol. 6, No. 6	Dec 1995/Jan 1996	P-4 Vampirella Gallery		Topps
Vol. 6, No. 6	Dec 1995/Jan 1996	Unnumbered Marvel Masterpieces '95 4-card panel		Fleer
Vol. 7, No. 1	Feb/Mar 1996	Unnumbered Garfield Chromium Card		Krome Productions
Vol. 7, No. 1	Feb/Mar 1996	Unnumbered Star Trek: Reflections of the Future Phase One	NSU Exclusive [L]	Fleer/SkyBox
Vol. 7, No. 1	Feb/Mar 1996	Unnumbered Batman Master Series Card		SkyBox International
Vol. 7, No. 1	Feb/Mar 1996	P3 Return of the Jedi Widevision		Topps
Vol. 7, No. 2	Apr/May 1996	Unnumbered Amalgam card		Fleer
Vol. 7, No. 2	Apr/May 1996	P1 Barb Wire		Topps
Vol. 7, No. 2	Apr/May 1996	P1 WildStorm Archives II		WildStorm
Vol. 7, No. 3	Jun/Jul 1996	S1 The Phantom		Inkworks
Vol. 7, No. 3	Jun/Jul 1996	Unnumbered Twister card		Donruss
Vol. 7, No. 3	Jun/Jul 1996	Unnumbered Flipper card		Donruss
Vol. 7, No. 3	Jun/Jul 1996	SWF3 Star Wars Finest		Topps
Vol. 7, No. 4	Aug/Sep 1996	PROTOTYPE Kazaam		Donruss
Vol. 7, No. 4	Aug/Sep 1996	SOTE2 Shadows of the Empire		Topps
Vol. 7, No. 4	Aug/Sep 1996	P Melrose Place		Sports Time
Vol. 7, No. 4	Aug/Sep 1996	P2 The Frighteners		Dart Flipcards
Vol. 7, No. 4	Aug/Sep 1996	2 of 5 The Crow: City of Angels	NSU Exclusive [L]	Kitchen Sink Press
Vol. 7, No. 4	Aug/Sep 1996	P1 Independence Day Widevision		Topps
Vol. 7, No. 5	Oct/Nov 1996	P3 The X-Files Season Three		Topps
Vol. 7, No. 5	Oct/Nov 1996	P-1 James Bond Connoisseur's Collection Series One		Inkworks
Vol. 7, No. 5	Oct/Nov 1996	Unnumbered Witchblade Trading Card		Dynamic Forces
Vol. 7, No. 6	Dec 1996/Jan 1997	Unnumbered Mars Attacks! Widevision		Topps
Vol. 7, No. 6	Dec 1996/Jan 1997	8 of 9, 9 of 9 Marvel Ultra Onslaught were randomly inserted	NSU Exclusive	Fleer/SkyBox
Vol. 7, No. 6	Dec 1996/Jan 1997	Promo 3 of Six Universal Monsters of the Silver Screen	NSU Exclusive [L]	Kitchen Sink Press
Vol. 7, No. 6	Dec 1996/Jan 1997	Promo Card 2 Wild West - The Art of Mort Kunstler		Keepsake Collectibles
Vol. 8, No. 1	Feb/Mar 1997	Unnumbered Ken Kelly Stickers	NSU Exclusive any one of 20 different stickers was inserted	FPG
Vol. 8, No. 1	Feb/Mar 1997	Unnumbered X-Men 2099 Comic Images		Fleer/SkyBox
Vol. 8, No. 1	Feb/Mar 1997	P-2 James Bond Connoisseur's Collection Vol. Two		Inkworks
Vol. 8, No. 1	Feb/Mar 1997	P3 Star Wars Trilogy		Topps
Vol. 8, No. 2	Apr/May 1997	Unnumbered Art Treasures of the Vatican Library		Keepsake Collectibles
Vol. 8, No. 2	Apr/May 1997	Unnumbered Sliders		Inkworks
Vol. 8, No. 2	Apr/May 1997	Unnumbered The Three Stooges		DuoCards
Vol. 8, No. 3	Jun/Jul 1997	7 Ash	NSU Exclusive [L]	Dynamic Forces
Vol. 8, No. 3	Jun/Jul 1997	Unnumbered Men In Black [Two versions]		Inkworks
Vol. 8, No. 3	Jun/Jul 1997	Not known Star Wars Trilogy cards from the regular production run were randomly inserted		Merlin Collections
Vol. 8, No. 3	Jun/Jul 1997	Unnumbered Paul Pope Presents THB and More		Comic Images
Vol. 8, No. 3	Jun/Jul 1997	Unnumbered Star Wars Vehicles promotional postcard		Topps
Vol. 8, No. 4	Aug/Sep 1997	Unnumbered Spawn The Movie		Inkworks
Vol. 8, No. 4	Aug/Sep 1997	1 of 2, 2 of 2 Doug Beekman were randomly inserted		Comic Images
Vol. 8, No. 4	Aug/Sep 1997	P7 KISS	NSU Exclusive [L]	Cornerstone Communications
Vol. 8, No. 4	Aug/Sep 1997	P-3 James Bond Connoisseur's Collection Vol. Three		Inkworks
Vol. 8, No. 5	Oct/Nov 1997	1 of 2, 2 of 2 The Outer Limits were randomly inserted		DuoCards
Vol. 8, No. 5	Oct/Nov 1997	P Melrose Place		Sports Time
Vol. 8, No. 5	Oct/Nov 1997	1 of 2, 2 of 2 Lionel Trains were randomly inserted		DuoCards
Vol. 8, No. 6	Dec 1997/Jan 1997	P-3 Lost In Space		Inkworks
Vol. 8, No. 6	Dec 1997/Jan 1997	Unnumbered Star Trek: The Original Series		Fleer/SkyBox
Vol. 8, No. 6	Dec 1997/Jan 1997	P1 Starship Troopers		Inkworks
Vol. 8, No. 6	Dec 1997/Jan 1997	Promo Card 2 of 3 Meanie Babies		Comic Images
Vol. 9, No. 1	Feb/Mar 1998	Unnumbered Gilligan's Island	NSU Exclusive [L]	Dart Flipcards
Vol. 9, No. 1	Feb/Mar 1998	Unnumbered Sirius Gallery		Comic Images
Vol. 9, No. 1	Feb/Mar 1998	MP1 Lost In Space		Inkworks
Vol. 9, No. 1	Feb/Mar 1998	P3 TV's Coolest Classics		Inkworks
Vol. 9, No. 2	Apr/May 1998	P1 Xena Warrior Princess		Topps
Vol. 9, No. 2	Apr/May 1998	Promo Card 1 Happy Days		DuoCards
Vol. 9, No. 3	Jun/Jul 1998	P1 The X-Files		Topps
Vol. 9, No. 3	Jun/Jul 1998	1, 2 Zorro were randomly inserted		DuoCards
Vol. 9, No. 3	Jun/Jul 1998	Unnumbered Star Trek: The Original Series 1967-68 Season 2		Fleer/SkyBox
Vol. 9, No. 3	Jun/Jul 1998	Unnumbered Marvel Creators Collection '98		Fleer/SkyBox
Vol. 9, No. 3	Jun/Jul 1998	P1 Godzilla		Inkworks
Vol. 9, No. 4	Aug/Sep 1998	Unnumbered Star Trek: Voyager Profiles		Fleer/SkyBox
Vol. 9, No. 4	Aug/Sep 1998	P1, P2 KISS Series 2 were randomly inserted		Cornerstone Communications
Vol. 9, No. 4	Aug/Sep 1998	P2 Small Soldiers		Inkworks
Vol. 9, No. 5	Oct/Nov 1998	BP1 Buffy The Vampire Slayer		Inkworks
Vol. 9, No. 5	Oct/Nov 1998	P2 Xena 2		Topps
Vol. 9, No. 5	Oct/Nov 1998	P1, P2, P3, P4, P5 WCW Wrestling one of which were randomly inserted		Topps
Vol. 9, No. 5	Oct/Nov 1998	P1 Alien Legacy		Inkworks
Vol. 9, No. 6	Dec 1998/Jan 1999	Unnumbered Babylon 5 Season 5		Fleer/SkyBox
Vol. 9, No. 6	Dec 1998/Jan 1999	Unnumbered Star Trek: Insurrection		Fleer/SkyBox
Vol. 9, No. 6	Dec 1998/Jan 1999	Unnumbered Marvel: The Silver Age		Fleer/SkyBox
Vol. 9, No. 6	Dec 1998/Jan 1999	P2 Alien Legacy		Inkworks
Vol. 10, No. 1	Feb/Mar 1999	P2 Lost in Space Classic Episodes Series		Inkworks
Vol. 10, No. 1	Feb/Mar 1999	Unnumbered Star Trek: The Original Series Season 3		Fleer/SkyBox
Vol. 10, No. 1	Feb/Mar 1999	BP1 Buffy The Vampire Slayer Season 2		Inkworks
Vol. 10, No. 2	Apr/May 1999	Unnumbered Star Trek: Deep Space Nine Memories From The Future		Fleer/SkyBox
Vol. 10, No. 2	Apr/May 1999	P2 Planet of the Apes Archives		Inkworks
Vol. 10, No. 2	Apr/May 1999	P2 Star Wars Chrome Archives		Topps
Vol. 10, No. 3	Jun/Jul 1999	P5 Austin Powers, The Spy Who Shagged Me	NSU Exclusive	Cornerstone Communications
Vol. 10, No. 4	Aug/Sep 1999	Unnumbered Wild Wild West		Fleer/SkyBox
Vol. 10, No. 4	Aug/Sep 1999	Unnumbered Star Trek: The Next Generation Episode Coll. Season 7		Fleer/SkyBox
Vol. 10, No. 4	Aug/Sep 1999	P2 Elvis The Platinum Collection		Inkworks
Vol. 10, No. 4	Aug/Sep 1999	B3-4 Buffy The Vampire Slayer Season 3		Inkworks
Vol. 10, No. 5	Oct/Nov 1999	Unnumbered Babylon 5 Profiles		Fleer/SkyBox
Vol. 10, No. 5	Oct/Nov 1999	P1, P2, P3 WWF Smackdown! were randomly inserted		Comic Images
Vol. 10, No. 5	Oct/Nov 1999	P3 Tim Burton's Sleepy Hollow		Inkworks
Vol. 10, No. 6	Dec 1999/Jan 2000	P-1 The Twilight Zone: Premiere Edition		Rittenhouse Archives
Vol. 10, No. 6	Dec 1999/Jan 2000	P1 James Bond The World Is Not Enough		Inkworks
Vol. 10, No. 6	Dec 1999/Jan 2000	Unnumbered Star Trek: Voyager, Closer to Home		Fleer/SkyBox
Vol. 10, No. 6	Dec 1999/Jan 2000	P1, P2 WCW Embossed were randomly inserted		Topps
Vol. 11, No. 1	Feb/Mar 2000	P1 Star Wars Episode One 3DI		Topps
Vol. 11, No. 1	Feb/Mar 2000	P0 Charmed		Inkworks
Vol. 11, No. 2	Apr/May 2000	[No cards]		-
Vol. 11, No. 3	Jun/Jul 2000	Unnumbered Star Trek: The Next Generation Profiles		Fleer/SkyBox
Vol. 11, No. 3	Jun/Jul 2000	X4 of 4 X-Men Movie Trading Cards		Topps
Vol. 11, No. 4	Aug/Sep 2000	P3 Titan A.E.		Inkworks
Vol. 11, No. 4	Aug/Sep 2000	P1 Farscape		Rittenhouse Archives
Vol. 11, No. 4	Aug/Sep 2000	P1 Wild Wild West		Rittenhouse Archives
Vol. 11, No. 5	Oct/Nov 2000	NSU-1 The Simpsons	NSU Exclusive	Inkworks
Vol. 11, No. 5	Oct/Nov 2000	Unnumbered Gundam Wing		Upper Deck
Vol. 11, No. 5	Oct/Nov 2000	30 of 160 Sailor Moon CCG	NSU Exclusive	Dart Flipcards
Vol. 11, No. 5	Oct/Nov 2000	AP-2 Angel Season One		Inkworks
Vol. 11, No. 5	Oct/Nov 2000	B4-2 Buffy The Vampire Slayer Season 4		Inkworks
Vol. 11, No. 6	Dec 2000/Jan 2001	PR-2 Roswell		Inkworks
Vol. 11, No. 6	Dec 2000/Jan 2001	Not known Golden HorseShu Cards random regular production run cards were inserted		Stellar Publishing Corporation
Vol. 12, No. 1	Feb/Mar 2001	P1 Premiere Edition Stargate SG-1		Rittenhouse Archives
Vol. 12, No. 1	Feb/Mar 2001	NSU1 Crimson	NSU Exclusive	Dynamic Forces
Vol. 12, No. 1	Feb/Mar 2001	SI-1 The Definitive Dr. Who and two other cards were randomly inserted		Strictly Ink
Vol. 12, No. 2	Apr/May 2001	P3 Marvel Legends Daredevil Promo		Topps
Vol. 12, No. 2	Apr/May 2001	P4 Xena Warrior Princess Seasons 4 and 5		Rittenhouse Archives
Vol. 12, No. 2	Apr/May 2001	NSU1 Fathom	NSU Exclusive	Dynamic Forces
Vol. 12, No. 2	Apr/May 2001	P2 The X-Files Seasons 4 & 5		Inkworks
Vol. 12, No. 3	Jun/Jul 2001	TR2 Tomb Raider		Inkworks
Vol. 12, No. 3	Jun/Jul 2001	PPGS2 No.1 The Powerpuff Girls Series 2 (Lenticular motion)		Artbox Entertainment
Vol. 12, No. 3	Jun/Jul 2001	MR-2 The Mummy Returns	NSU Exclusive	Inkworks
Vol. 12, No. 3	Jun/Jul 2001	JP3-2 Jurassic Park 3		Inkworks
Vol. 12, No. 3	Jun/Jul 2001	4 of 70 Sailor Moon Expansion	NSU Exclusive	Dart Flipcards
Vol. 12, No. 4	Aug/Sep 2001	P1 LEXX		Dynamic Forces
Vol. 12, No. 4	Aug/Sep 2001	Unnumbered Hercules The Complete Journeys		Rittenhouse Archives
Vol. 12, No. 4	Aug/Sep 2001	2 of 4 Planet of the Apes		Topps
Vol. 12, No. 4	Aug/Sep 2001	P1, P2 Star Wars Evolution were randomly inserted at a 50-50 rate		Topps
Vol. 12, No. 4	Aug/Sep 2001	P1 Thunderbirds		Cards Inc.
Vol. 12, No. 4	Aug/Sep 2001	B5-2 Buffy the Vampire Slayer Season 5	NSU Exclusive Inkworks Embossed Card Cover Variant Buffy the Vampire Slayer/Angel SDCC 2001	Inkworks
Vol. 12, No. 5	Oct/Nov 2001	Unnumbered Farscape Season 2		Rittenhouse Archives
Vol. 12, No. 5	Oct/Nov 2001	B5-2 Buffy The Vampire Slayer Season 5		Inkworks
Vol. 12, No. 5	Oct/Nov 2001	Unnumbered The Crocodile Hunter		Dart Flipcards
Vol. 12, No. 5	Oct/Nov 2001	Unnumbered Top Cow Universe		Dynamic Forces
Vol. 12, No. 5	Oct/Nov 2001	Not known Crocodile Hunter Philly Show Special No.1 in Variant Cover: 35th Philly Show Exclusive The Card Hunter		Dart Flipcards
Vol. 12, No. 5	Oct/Nov 2001	Not known Philly Non-Sports one of the many Philly promotional cards was randomly inserted in Variant Cover: 35th Philly Show Exclusive The Card Hunter Frank E. Reighter		
Vol. 12, No. 5	Oct/Nov 2001	Promo No.1 Philly Non-Sports Card Show [only one random copy of this issue contains the rare Philly "1" card] in Variant Cover: 35th Philly Show Exclusive The Card Hunter Frank E. Reighter		
Vol. 12, No. 6	Dec 2001/Jan 2002	P2 Lord of the Rings		Topps
Vol. 12, No. 6	Dec 2001/Jan 2002	P2 SimpsonsMania		Inkworks
Vol. 12, No. 6	Dec 2001/Jan 2002	P2 Xena Season 6		Rittenhouse Archives
Vol. 12, No. 6	Dec 2001/Jan 2002	Unnumbered Dawn		Dynamic Forces
Vol. 12, No. 6	Dec 2001/Jan 2002	Unnumbered Outer Limits		Rittenhouse Archives
Vol. 13, No. 1	Feb/Mar 2002	XF8-2 The X-Files Season 8		Inkworks
Vol. 13, No. 1	Feb/Mar 2002	P1 Dark Angel		Topps
Vol. 13, No. 1	Feb/Mar 2002	NS-1 Dr. Who Series 2		Strictly Ink
Vol. 13, No. 1	Feb/Mar 2002	Promo 1 of 4 Best Defense PrintShip		
Vol. 13, No. 2	Apr/May 2002	Unnumbered LEXX		Dynamic Forces
Vol. 13, No. 2	Apr/May 2002	P1 Spider-Man		Topps
Vol. 13, No. 2	Apr/May 2002	P1, P2 and P3 Butt-Ugly Martians were randomly inserted		Comic Images
Vol. 13, No. 2	Apr/May 2002	Unnumbered Witchblade Disciples of the Blade		Dynamic Forces
Vol. 13, No. 2	Apr/May 2002	SKP-2 The Scorpion King		Inkworks
Vol. 13, No. 2	Apr/May 2002	P1 The Complete Babylon 5		Rittenhouse Archives
Vol. 13, No. 2	Apr/May 2002	LEXX	NSU Exclusive in Variant Cover: Lexx	Dynamic Forces
Vol. 13, No. 2	Apr/May 2002	NSU 1 Witchblade Disciples of the Blade	NSU Exclusive	Dynamic Forces
Vol. 13, No. 2	Apr/May 2002	NSU 1 Battle of the Planets	NSU Exclusive	Dynamic Forces
Vol. 13, No. 3	Jun/Jul 2002	P1 Star Wars Episode II Attack of the Clones		Topps
Vol. 13, No. 3	Jun/Jul 2002	P1 The Complete Star Trek Voyager		Rittenhouse Archives
Vol. 13, No. 3	Jun/Jul 2002	SD-2 Scooby-Doo		Inkworks
Vol. 13, No. 3	Jun/Jul 2002	Unnumbered Battle of the Planets		Dynamic Forces
Vol. 13, No. 4	Aug/Sep 2002	Unknown Dragonball Z FilmCardz Random FilmCardz were inserted		Artbox Entertainment
Vol. 13, No. 4	Aug/Sep 2002	Unknown Bench Warmer Random Bench Warmer cards were inserted		Bench Warmer
Vol. 13, No. 4	Aug/Sep 2002	P1, P2, P3 Olivia Metamorphosis were randomly inserted		Comic Images
Vol. 13, No. 4	Aug/Sep 2002	P2 Men In Black II		Inkworks
Vol. 13, No. 4	Aug/Sep 2002	P2 James Bond 40th Anniversary		Rittenhouse Archives
Vol. 13, No. 4	Aug/Sep 2002	P1 Star Trek Enterprise (Note: "Star Trek" does not appear on the card)		Rittenhouse Archives
Vol. 13, No. 4	Aug/Sep 2002	NSU-SD Buffy the Vampire Slayer Season 6	NSU Exclusive in Variant Cover: Buffy the Vampire Slayer SDCC 2002	Inkworks
Vol. 13, No. 5	Oct/Nov 2002	P1 Star Wars Attack of the Clones Widevision		Topps
Vol. 13, No. 5	Oct/Nov 2002	P1 James Bond Die Another Day		Rittenhouse Archives
Vol. 13, No. 5	Oct/Nov 2002	P1 Farscape Season 3		Rittenhouse Archives
Vol. 13, No. 5	Oct/Nov 2002	B6-2 Buffy The Vampire Slayer Season Six foil OR non-foil		Inkworks
Vol. 13, No. 5	Oct/Nov 2002	P1 Stargate SG-1 Season 5		Rittenhouse Archives
Vol. 13, No. 6	Dec 2002/Jan 2003	P2 Star Trek Nemesis		Rittenhouse Archives
Vol. 13, No. 6	Dec 2002/Jan 2003	P-2 Smallville		Inkworks
Vol. 13, No. 6	Dec 2002/Jan 2003	P1 The Lord of The Rings, The Two Towers		Topps
Vol. 13, No. 6	Dec 2002/Jan 2003	P2 Xena Beauty & Brawn		Rittenhouse Archives
Vol. 14, No. 1	Feb/Mar 2003	P2 Daredevil		Topps
Vol. 14, No. 1	Feb/Mar 2003	P2 Star Trek The Animated Adventures		Rittenhouse Archives
Vol. 14, No. 2	Apr/May 2003	P2 Farscape Season 4		Rittenhouse Archives
Vol. 14, No. 2	Apr/May 2003	P2 The Complete Highlander The Series		Rittenhouse Archives
Vol. 14, No. 2	Apr/May 2003	P1 X-Men 2		Topps
Vol. 14, No. 3	Jun/Jul 2003	P02 Disney Treasures		Upper Deck
Vol. 14, No. 3	Jun/Jul 2003	P3 Terminator 3		Comic Images
Vol. 14, No. 3	Jun/Jul 2003	P2 The Complete Star Trek Deep Space 9		Rittenhouse Archives
Vol. 14, No. 3	Jun/Jul 2003	P2 The Outer Limits		Rittenhouse Archives
Vol. 14, No. 4	Aug/Sep 2003	B7-2 Buffy The Vampire Slayer Season 7		Inkworks
Vol. 14, No. 4	Aug/Sep 2003	A4-2 Angel Season 4		Inkworks
Vol. 14, No. 4	Aug/Sep 2003	Unnumbered The Midwest NonSport Card Expo Paul Maiellaro		
Vol. 14, No. 4	Aug/Sep 2003	P2 The Women of James Bond In Motion		Rittenhouse Archives
Vol. 14, No. 4	Aug/Sep 2003	NSU-SD Buffy the Vampire Slayer Season 7	NSU Exclusive in Variant Cover: Buffy the Vampire Slayer SDCC 2003	Inkworks
Vol. 14, No. 5	Oct/Nov 2003	P2 The Quotable Xena Warrior Princess		Rittenhouse Archives
Vol. 14, No. 5	Oct/Nov 2003	P2 Enterprise Season 2		Rittenhouse Archives
Vol. 14, No. 5	Oct/Nov 2003	SM2-2 Smallville Season Two		Inkworks
Vol. 14, No. 5	Oct/Nov 2003	P2, P3, P4 24 were randomly inserted		Comic Images
Vol. 14, No. 5	Oct/Nov 2003	P1 Lord of the Rings Return of the King		Topps
Vol. 14, No. 5	Oct/Nov 2003	P1 24	NSU Exclusive in Variant Cover: 24 Midwest Expo 2003	Comic Images
Vol. 14, No. 6	Dec 2003/Jan 2004	A2-NSU Alias Season Two		Inkworks
Vol. 14, No. 6	Dec 2003/Jan 2004	P2 The Fantasy Worlds of Irwin Allen		Rittenhouse Archives
Vol. 14, No. 6	Dec 2003/Jan 2004	P2 The Complete Battlestar Galactica		Rittenhouse Archives
Vol. 14, No. 6	Dec 2003/Jan 2004	Sp1 The Lord of the Rings, The Return of the King Action Flipz	NSU Exclusive in Variant Cover: Lord of the Rings/Return of the King Fall 2003 Pre-Holiday Spectacular/Memorabilia England	Artbox Entertainment
Vol. 15, No. 1	Feb/Mar 2004	P2 Hellboy		Inkworks
Vol. 15, No. 1	Feb/Mar 2004	P2 The Quotable Star Trek: The Original Series		Rittenhouse Archives
Vol. 15, No. 1	Feb/Mar 2004	P1, P2, P3 Don't Let It Happen were randomly inserted		Monsterwax
Vol. 15, No. 2	Apr/May 2004	P2 Stargate SG-1 Season 6		Rittenhouse Archives
Vol. 15, No. 2	Apr/May 2004	P1 Star Wars Clone Wars		Topps
Vol. 15, No. 2	Apr/May 2004	P-2 Scooby-Doo 2: Monsters Unleashed		Inkworks
Vol. 15, No. 2	Apr/May 2004	P2 Charmed Connections		Inkworks
Vol. 15, No. 2	Apr/May 2004	101 Bench Warmer 2003 [Three versions of this card may be found: two with different versions of the NSU logo and 100 randomly inserted dual-autographed cards]	NSU Exclusive [L]	Bench Warmer
Vol. 15, No. 2	Apr/May 2004	Promo 03 Harry Potter and the Prisoner of Azkaban		Artbox Entertainment
Vol. 15, No. 3	Jun/Jul 2004	P2 Enterprise Season 3		Rittenhouse Archives
Vol. 15, No. 3	Jun/Jul 2004	P2 Chronicles of Riddick		Rittenhouse Archives
Vol. 15, No. 3	Jun/Jul 2004	#2 of 3 Wacky Packages Promo Sticker		Topps
Vol. 15, No. 3	Jun/Jul 2004	P-2 Catwoman		Inkworks
Vol. 15, No. 3	Jun/Jul 2004	Promo 02 Harry Potter and the Prisoner of Azkaban		Artbox Entertainment
Vol. 15, No. 4	Aug/Sep 2004	P2 The Dead Zone		Rittenhouse Archives
Vol. 15, No. 4	Aug/Sep 2004	P2 Six Feet Under		Rittenhouse Archives
Vol. 15, No. 4	Aug/Sep 2004	A5-2 Angel Season 5		Inkworks
Vol. 15, No. 4	Aug/Sep 2004	Unnumbered Chicagoland Entertainment Collector's Expo Paul Maiellaro		
Vol. 15, No. 4	Aug/Sep 2004	WOS NSU-SD Buffy the Vampire Slayer: Women of Sunnydale	NSU Exclusive in Variant Cover: Buffy the Vampire Slayer: Women of Sunnydale SDCC 2004	Inkworks
Vol. 15, No. 5	Oct/Nov 2004	P2 Art & Images of Xena: Warrior Princess		Rittenhouse Archives
Vol. 15, No. 5	Oct/Nov 2004	SM3-2 Smallville Season 3		Inkworks
Vol. 15, No. 5	Oct/Nov 2004	P4 Star Wars Heritage		Topps
Vol. 15, No. 5	Oct/Nov 2004	P5 Star Wars Heritage		Topps
Vol. 15, No. 5	Oct/Nov 2004	P2 The Complete Munsters: The Original Series		Rittenhouse Archives
Vol. 15, No. 6	Dec 2004/Jan 2005	A3-2 Alias Season Three		Inkworks
Vol. 15, No. 6	Dec 2004/Jan 2005	P2 Farscape Through The Wormhole		Rittenhouse Archives
Vol. 15, No. 6	Dec 2004/Jan 2005	P1, P2, P3 U Go Girl were randomly inserted		LocaSmarts LLC
Vol. 15, No. 6	Dec 2004/Jan 2005	P2 The Quotable James Bond		Rittenhouse Archives
Vol. 15, No. 6	Dec 2004/Jan 2005	Unnumbered Timem.com Official Autograph Cards		Timem.com
Vol. 15, No. 6	Dec 2004/Jan 2005	P2 The Quotable James Bond	NSU Exclusive in Variant Cover: James Bond Limited Edition Convention	Rittenhouse Archives
Vol. 16, No. 1	Feb/Mar 2005	P-2 Robots		Inkworks
Vol. 16, No. 1	Feb/Mar 2005	P2 Stargate SG-1 Season Seven		Rittenhouse Archives
Vol. 16, No. 1	Feb/Mar 2005	P2 The Quotable Star Trek: The Next Generation		Rittenhouse Archives
Vol. 16, No. 2	Apr/May 2005	P2 Star Trek Enterprise Season 4		Rittenhouse Archives
Vol. 16, No. 2	Apr/May 2005	P1 Star Wars Revenge of the Sith		Topps
Vol. 16, No. 2	Apr/May 2005	P2 Battlestar Galactica Premiere Edition		Rittenhouse Archives
Vol. 16, No. 2	Apr/May 2005	Promo 04 Harry Potter and the Sorcerer's Stone		Artbox Entertainment
Vol. 16, No. 2	Apr/May 2005	1 of 6, 2 of 6, 3 of 6, 4 of 6, 5 of 6, 6 of 6 Bench Warmer 2004 were randomly inserted	NSU Exclusive	Bench Warmer
Vol. 16, No. 2	Apr/May 2005	P2 Family Guy Season One		Inkworks
Vol. 16, No. 3	Jun/Jul 2005	P2 The Complete Lost In Space		Rittenhouse Archives
Vol. 16, No. 3	Jun/Jul 2005	S1-2 The Sopranos: Season One		Inkworks
Vol. 16, No. 4	Aug/Sep 2005	Promo 04 Frankenstein		Artbox Entertainment
Vol. 16, No. 4	Aug/Sep 2005	P2 Stargate Atlantis		Rittenhouse Archives
Vol. 16, No. 4	Aug/Sep 2005	P2 Buffy The Vampire Slayer and the Men of Sunnydale		Inkworks
Vol. 16, No. 4	Aug/Sep 2005	Unnumbered Chicagoland Entertainment Collectors Expo		CECE
Vol. 16, No. 4	Aug/Sep 2005	SP-NSUSD Serenity	NSU Exclusive in Variant Cover: Serenity SDCC 2005	Inkworks
Vol. 16, No. 5	Oct/Nov 2005	NSU 1 of 2 Lost look for the second card in NSU's Dec '05/Jan '06 issue	NSU Exclusive	Inkworks
Vol. 16, No. 5	Oct/Nov 2005	P2 Xena and Hercules - The Animated Adventures		Rittenhouse Archives
Vol. 16, No. 5	Oct/Nov 2005	P2 Art & Images of Star Trek The Original Series	NSU Exclusive [L]	Rittenhouse Archives
Vol. 16, No. 5	Oct/Nov 2005	P2 King Kong		Topps
Vol. 16, No. 5	Oct/Nov 2005	1 of 3, 2 of 3, 3 of 3 The Art of H.G. Wells Series 3 were randomly inserted	NSU Exclusive	Monsterwax
Vol. 16, No. 6	Dec 2005/Jan 2006	NSU 2 of 2 Lost look for the first card in NSU's Oct/Nov '05 issue	NSU Exclusive	Inkworks
Vol. 16, No. 6	Dec 2005/Jan 2006	P2 Battlestar Galactica Colonial Warriors		Rittenhouse Archives
Vol. 16, No. 6	Dec 2005/Jan 2006	P2 Alias Season Four		Inkworks
Vol. 16, No. 6	Dec 2005/Jan 2006	P2 James Bond Dangerous Liaisons		Rittenhouse Archives
Vol. 16, No. 6	Dec 2005/Jan 2006	L1-NSV Lost	NSU Exclusive in Variant Cover: Lost Big Apple Con/Memorabilia England	Inkworks
Vol. 17, No. 1	Feb/Mar 2006	P2 Battlestar Galactica Season One		Rittenhouse Archives
Vol. 17, No. 1	Feb/Mar 2006	P2 Stargate SG-1 Season 8		Rittenhouse Archives
Vol. 17, No. 1	Feb/Mar 2006	P-2 Veronica Mars Season One		Inkworks
Vol. 17, No. 2	Apr/May 2006	P-2 Firefly: The Complete Collection		Inkworks
Vol. 17, No. 2	Apr/May 2006	P2 Star Trek 40th Anniversary		Rittenhouse Archives
Vol. 17, No. 2	Apr/May 2006	P1 Superman Returns		Topps
Vol. 17, No. 2	Apr/May 2006	P-2 Family Guy: Season Two		Inkworks
Vol. 17, No. 3	Jun/Jul 2006	P2 X-Men The Last Stand		Rittenhouse Archives
Vol. 17, No. 3	Jun/Jul 2006	P-2 Charmed: Destiny		Inkworks
Vol. 17, No. 3	Jun/Jul 2006	P-2 The 4400 Season One		Inkworks
Vol. 17, No. 4	Aug/Sep 2006	1 of 6, 2 of 6, 3 of 6, 4 of 6, 5 of 6, 6 of 6 Bench Warmer World Cup Soccer were randomly inserted	NSU Exclusive	Bench Warmer
Vol. 17, No. 4	Aug/Sep 2006	P2 WWE Insider		Topps
Vol. 17, No. 4	Aug/Sep 2006	P2 The Complete Avengers		Rittenhouse Archives
Vol. 17, No. 4	Aug/Sep 2006	P2 Star Wars Evolution Update Edition		Topps
Vol. 17, No. 4	Aug/Sep 2006	P2 Stargate Atlantis Season Two		Rittenhouse Archives
Vol. 17, No. 4	Aug/Sep 2006	LR-NSV Lost Revelations	NSU Exclusive in Variant Cover: Lost SDCC 2006	Inkworks
Vol. 17, No. 5	Oct/Nov 2006	P2 Star Trek The Original Series 40th Anniversary		Rittenhouse Archives
Vol. 17, No. 5	Oct/Nov 2006	Unknown Gross Out two-card cello pack with random numbers inserted in each issue		Upper Deck
Vol. 17, No. 5	Oct/Nov 2006	B-2 Buffy The Vampire Slayer Memories		Inkworks
Vol. 17, No. 5	Oct/Nov 2006	P2 Lord of the Rings Masterpieces		Topps
Vol. 17, No. 6	Dec 2006/Jan 2007	NSU-1 24 Season 4	NSU Exclusive	Artbox Entertainment
Vol. 17, No. 6	Dec 2006/Jan 2007	L2-2 Lost Season 2		Inkworks
Vol. 17, No. 6	Dec 2006/Jan 2007	P2 Battlestar Galactica Season 2		Rittenhouse Archives
Vol. 17, No. 6	Dec 2006/Jan 2007	Unnumbered Elvis Lives	NSU Exclusive in Variant Cover: Elvis Lives Convention Press Pass	
Vol. 18, No. 1	Feb/Mar 2007	P2 Xena: Dangerous Liaisons		Rittenhouse Archives
Vol. 18, No. 1	Feb/Mar 2007	P2 Stargate SG-1 Season 9		Rittenhouse Archives
Vol. 18, No. 1	Feb/Mar 2007	HA-2 Hellboy Animated Sword Of Storms		Inkworks
Vol. 18, No. 2	Apr/May 2007	S3-2 Shrek The Third		Inkworks
Vol. 18, No. 2	Apr/May 2007	P2 The Complete James Bond		Rittenhouse Archives
Vol. 18, No. 3	Jun/Jul 2007	P2 The Quotable Star Trek Deep Space Nine		Rittenhouse Archives
Vol. 18, No. 3	Jun/Jul 2007	P2 Hollywood Zombies		Topps
Vol. 18, No. 3	Jun/Jul 2007	NSU-01 Harry Potter and the Order of the Phoenix	NSU Exclusive	Artbox Entertainment
Vol. 18, No. 3	Jun/Jul 2007	P-2 The 4400 Season 2		Inkworks
Vol. 18, No. 4	Aug/Sep 2007	P2 Star Wars 40th Anniversary		Topps
Vol. 18, No. 4	Aug/Sep 2007	P2 DC Legacy		Rittenhouse Archives
Vol. 18, No. 4	Aug/Sep 2007	J1-P2 Jericho: Season One		Inkworks
Vol. 18, No. 4	Aug/Sep 2007	B10-NSU Buffy The Vampire Slayer 10th Anniversary in Variant Cover: Buffy The Vampire Slayer 10th Anniversary SDCC 2007	NSU Exclusive	Inkworks
Vol. 18, No. 5	Oct/Nov 2007	P5 Marvel Masterpieces Wolverine Promo	NSU Exclusive	Upper Deck
Vol. 18, No. 5	Oct/Nov 2007	P2 The Complete Star Trek Movies		Rittenhouse Archives
Vol. 18, No. 5	Oct/Nov 2007	P-2 The Seeker: The Dark Is Rising		Inkworks
Vol. 18, No. 5	Oct/Nov 2007	NSU-SW1 Star Wars Tribute in Variant Cover: Chicagoland Star Wars Tribute '07	NSU Exclusive	CECE
Vol. 18, No. 6	Dec 2007/Jan 2008	GC-P2 The Golden Compass		Inkworks
Vol. 18, No. 6	Dec 2007/Jan 2008	P-2 Aliens vs. Predator: Requiem		Inkworks
Vol. 18, No. 6	Dec 2007/Jan 2008	P5 Heroes	NSU Exclusive	Topps
Vol. 19, No. 1	Feb/Mar 2008	SC-2 The Spiderwick Chronicles		Inkworks
Vol. 19, No. 1	Feb/Mar 2008	P2 Star Trek TOS 40th Anniversary: Series 2		Rittenhouse Archives
Vol. 19, No. 2	Apr/May 2008	P-2 Kung Fu Panda		Inkworks
Vol. 19, No. 2	Apr/May 2008	P2 Women of Marvel		Rittenhouse Archives
Vol. 19, No. 2	Apr/May 2008	P2 Iron Man		Rittenhouse Archives
Vol. 19, No. 3	Jun/Jul 2008	P5 Indiana Jones and the Kingdom of the Crystal Skull		Topps
Vol. 19, No. 3	Jun/Jul 2008	P2 Battlestar Galactica Season 3		Rittenhouse Archives
Vol. 19, No. 3	Jun/Jul 2008	P2 Stargate SG-1 Season 10		Rittenhouse Archives
Vol. 19, No. 4	Aug/Sep 2008	P2 Batman Archives		Rittenhouse Archives
Vol. 19, No. 4	Aug/Sep 2008	P1 Star Wars: The Clone Wars		Topps
Vol. 19, No. 4	Aug/Sep 2008	P2 Stargate: Atlantis Seasons Three & Four		Rittenhouse Archives
Vol. 19, No. 4	Aug/Sep 2008	Unknown Americana II two different promos were randomly inserted		Donruss
Vol. 19, No. 4	Aug/Sep 2008	P9 Marvel Masterpieces Galactus Promo	NSU Exclusive in Variant Cover: Marvel Masterpieces Comic Con International 2008	Upper Deck
Vol. 19, No. 5	Oct/Nov 2008	P2 Fantastic Four Archives		Rittenhouse Archives
Vol. 19, No. 5	Oct/Nov 2008	Unnumbered James Bond In Motion		Rittenhouse Archives
Vol. 19, No. 5	Oct/Nov 2008	P6 Marvel Masterpieces Set 2 Ms. Marvel Promo	NSU Exclusive	Upper Deck
Vol. 19, No. 6	Dec 2008/Jan 2009	P-2 The Spirit		Inkworks
Vol. 19, No. 6	Dec 2008/Jan 2009	P2 Star Trek The Movies In Motion		Rittenhouse Archives
Vol. 19, No. 6	Dec 2008/Jan 2009	P11 Marvel Masterpieces Set 3 Spider-Man Promo	NSU Exclusive	Upper Deck
Vol. 19, No. 6	Dec 2008/Jan 2009	P1 Indiana Jones Masterpieces		Topps
Vol. 20, No. 1	Feb/Mar 2009	P2 Star Wars Galaxy Series 4		Topps
Vol. 20, No. 1	Feb/Mar 2009	P-2 Ghost Whisperer Seasons 1 and 2		Inkworks
Vol. 20, No. 2	Apr/May 2009	P2 James Bond Archives		Rittenhouse Archives
Vol. 20, No. 2	Apr/May 2009	P2 Star Trek		Rittenhouse Archives
Vol. 20, No. 3	Jun/Jul 2009	P2 X-Men Archives		Rittenhouse Archives
Vol. 20, No. 3	Jun/Jul 2009	P2 Battlestar Galactica Season Four		Rittenhouse Archives
Vol. 20, No. 4	Aug/Sep 2009	P1, P2, P3 Urban Legends were randomly inserted	NSU Exclusive	Monsterwax
Vol. 20, No. 4	Aug/Sep 2009	NSUP1 Legends & Lore	NSU Exclusive	sadlittles.com
Vol. 20, No. 4	Aug/Sep 2009	P2 2009 Star Trek: The Original Series		Rittenhouse Archives
Vol. 20, No. 4	Aug/Sep 2009	PR1 America at War		iCardz
Vol. 20, No. 5	Oct/Nov 2009	Unnumbered Wacky Packages Old School	NSU Exclusive	Topps
Vol. 20, No. 5	Oct/Nov 2009	P2 Stargate Heroes	NSU Exclusive	Rittenhouse Archives
Vol. 20, No. 5	Oct/Nov 2009	Unnumbered Chicagoland 10th Anniversary/NSU 20th Anniversary		CECE
Vol. 20, No. 5	Oct/Nov 2009	P1 The Complete Twilight Zone Trading Cards		Rittenhouse Archives
Vol. 20, No. 5	Oct/Nov 2009	NSU-SW2 Star Wars Tribute in Variant Cover: Chicagoland Star Wars Tribute '09	NSU Exclusive	CECE
Vol. 20, No. 6	Dec 2009/Jan 2010	Unnumbered Ghost Whisperer Seasons 3 & 4 foil OR non-foil	NSU Exclusive	Breygent Marketing
Vol. 20, No. 6	Dec 2009/Jan 2010	P7 LOST Seasons 1 thru 5	NSU Exclusive	Rittenhouse Archives
Vol. 20, No. 6	Dec 2009/Jan 2010	P2 Women of Star Trek	NSU Exclusive	Rittenhouse Archives
Vol. 20, No. 6	Dec 2009/Jan 2010	Promo Dexter Season 3	NSU Exclusive Promo in Variant Cover: Dexter UK Con [L]	Breygent Marketing
Vol. 21, No. 1	Feb/Mar 2010	P2 70 Years of Marvel Comics	NSU Exclusive	Rittenhouse Archives
Vol. 21, No. 2	Apr/May 2010	NSU Paranormal Activity	NSU Exclusive	Breygent Marketing
Vol. 21, No. 2	Apr/May 2010	P2 James Bond: Heroes & Villains	NSU Exclusive	Rittenhouse Archives
Vol. 21, No. 3	Jun/Jul 2010	P2 The Quotable Star Trek Movies	NSU Exclusive	Rittenhouse Archives
Vol. 21, No. 3	Jun/Jul 2010	PROMO Classic Vintage Movie Posters Sci-Fi Horror Collector Cards	NSU Exclusive	Breygent Marketing
Vol. 21, No. 3	Jun/Jul 2010	Unnumbered The Art Hustle Series 1 with three different colors (Red, Black, White) were randomly inserted		SideKick Media
Vol. 21, No. 3	Jun/Jul 2010	10TC Chicagoland Entertainment Collectors Expo	NSU Exclusive	CECE
Vol. 21, No. 4	Aug/Sep 2010	P2 LOST Archives	NSU Exclusive	Rittenhouse Archives
Vol. 21, No. 4	Aug/Sep 2010	NSU Woodstock Generation Rock Poster Cards	NSU Exclusive	Breygent Marketing
Vol. 21, No. 5	Oct/Nov 2010	P2 Marvel: Heroes & Villains	NSU Exclusive	Rittenhouse Archives
Vol. 21, No. 5	Oct/Nov 2010	P2 Warehouse 13	NSU Exclusive	Rittenhouse Archives
Vol. 21, No. 5	Oct/Nov 2010	Unnumbered Star Wars Galaxy 6 Ewok Costume Card	NSU Exclusive Topps in Variant Cover: Chicagoland Star Wars (Limited to 300 copies) [L]	
Vol. 21, No. 6	Dec 2010/Jan 2011	P2 Stargate Universe Season 1	NSU Exclusive	Rittenhouse Archives
Vol. 21, No. 6	Dec 2010/Jan 2011	P2 Star Trek: The Remastered Original Series	NSU Exclusive	Rittenhouse Archives
Vol. 21, No. 6	Dec 2010/Jan 2011	Unnumbered The Tudors: Seasons I, II, & III	NSU Exclusive	Breygent Marketing
Vol. 22, No. 1	Feb/Mar 2011	P2 Star Wars Galaxy 6	NSU Exclusive	Topps
Vol. 22, No. 1	Feb/Mar 2011	P2 Dangerous Divas	NSU Exclusive	Rittenhouse Archives
Vol. 22, No. 2	Apr/May 2011	One promo card was inserted: BP9-NSU [Common 9:10]; BP9a-NSU [Rare 1:10]	NSU Exclusive	Versicolor Productions
Vol. 22, No. 2	Apr/May 2011	P2 James Bond Mission Logs	NSU Exclusive	Rittenhouse Archives
Vol. 22, No. 3	Jun/Jul 2011	Unnumbered Transformers	NSU Exclusive	Enterplay
Vol. 22, No. 3	Jun/Jul 2011	P2 The Complete Star Trek: TNG Series One 1987-1991	NSU Exclusive	Rittenhouse Archives
Vol. 22, No. 3	Jun/Jul 2011	P2 Liberty Trading Cards	NSU Exclusive	Cryptozoic Entertainment
Vol. 22, No. 4	Aug/Sep 2011	P1 The Walking Dead	NSU Exclusive	Cryptozoic Entertainment
Vol. 22, No. 4	Aug/Sep 2011	1, 2, 3, 4, 5, 6 Bench Warmer Bubble Gum were randomly inserted	NSU Exclusive [L]	Bench Warmer
Vol. 22, No. 4	Aug/Sep 2011	P2 Eureka: Seasons 1 and 2	NSU Exclusive	Rittenhouse Archives
Vol. 22, No. 4	Aug/Sep 2011	P2 Warehouse 13: Season 2	NSU Exclusive	Rittenhouse Archives
Vol. 22, No. 5	Oct/Nov 2011	P1 The Vampire Diaries	NSU Exclusive	Cryptozoic Entertainment
Vol. 22, No. 5	Oct/Nov 2011	1, 2, 3 Spook Show were randomly inserted	NSU Exclusive	Monsterwax
Vol. 22, No. 5	Oct/Nov 2011	P2 Marvel Universe 2011 Thor in center Promo	NSU Exclusive	Rittenhouse Archives
Vol. 22, No. 6	Dec 2011/Jan 2012	P2 Star Trek Classic Movies Heroes & Villains	NSU Exclusive	Rittenhouse Archives
Vol. 23, No. 1	Feb/Mar 2012	P1 Smallville Seasons 7-10	NSU Exclusive	Cryptozoic Entertainment
Vol. 23, No. 1	Feb/Mar 2012	P2 The Complete Star Trek: TNG Series Two 1991-1994	NSU Exclusive	Rittenhouse Archives
Vol. 23, No. 1	Feb/Mar 2012	Unnumbered Yo Gabba Gabba!		Press Pass
Vol. 23, No. 2	Apr/May 2012	P1 The Big Bang Theory Seasons 1 & 2	NSU Exclusive	Cryptozoic Entertainment
Vol. 23, No. 2	Apr/May 2012	P2 Marvel Greatest Heroes Cappy Promo	NSU Exclusive	Rittenhouse Archives
Vol. 23, No. 2	Apr/May 2012	P1 Tarzan 100th Anniversary		Cryptozoic Entertainment
Vol. 23, No. 3	Jun/Jul 2012	P2 Game of Thrones	NSU Exclusive	Rittenhouse Archives
Vol. 23, No. 3	Jun/Jul 2012	P2 The Walking Dead	NSU Exclusive	Cryptozoic Entertainment
Vol. 23, No. 3	Jun/Jul 2012	P1 Fringe: Seasons 1 and 2	NSU Exclusive	Cryptozoic Entertainment
Vol. 23, No. 3	Jun/Jul 2012	P2 NCIS	NSU Exclusive	Rittenhouse Archives
Vol. 23, No. 4	Aug/Sep 2012	P2 Castle Seasons 1 & 2	NSU Exclusive	Cryptozoic Entertainment
Vol. 23, No. 4	Aug/Sep 2012	P1 The Walking Dead Season 2	NSU Exclusive	Cryptozoic Entertainment
Vol. 23, No. 4	Aug/Sep 2012	P2 True Blood Premiere Edition	NSU Exclusive	Rittenhouse Archives
Vol. 23, No. 4	Aug/Sep 2012	P1, 1/8 thru 8/8 Cereal Killers 2 were randomly inserted		Wax Eye
Vol. 23, No. 4	Aug/Sep 2012	Unnumbered Night of the Living Dead/The Avengers	NSU Exclusive	Unstoppable Cards
Vol. 23, No. 4	Aug/Sep 2012	Promo 001 - NSU Marvel Super Hero Squad	NSU Exclusive	Upper Deck
Vol. 23, No. 5	Oct/Nov 2012	P10 Mars Attacks Heritage	NSU Exclusive	Topps
Vol. 23, No. 5	Oct/Nov 2012	One of ten variant BP23-NSU Bettie Page Private Collection Box 2 cards was randomly inserted: Standard; No logo; Gold foil logo; Silver foil logo; Blue foil logo; Red foil logo; Prism finish; Metallic; Metallic Embossed; Embossed	NSU Exclusive	Versicolor Productions
Vol. 23, No. 5	Oct/Nov 2012	P1 The Vampire Diaries Season 2	NSU Exclusive	Cryptozoic Entertainment
Vol. 23, No. 5	Oct/Nov 2012	P2 The Quotable Star Trek Voyager	NSU Exclusive	Rittenhouse Archives
Vol. 23, No. 5	Oct/Nov 2012	P1 DC Comics Batman: The Legend	NSU Exclusive	Cryptozoic Entertainment
Vol. 23, No. 6	Dec 2012/Jan 2013	P1 Archer	NSU Exclusive	Cryptozoic Entertainment
Vol. 23, No. 6	Dec 2012/Jan 2013	P2 James Bond 50th Anniversary Trading Cards Series 2	NSU Exclusive	Rittenhouse Archives
Vol. 23, No. 6	Dec 2012/Jan 2013	P5 James Bond 50th Anniversary Trading Cards Series 2	NSU Exclusive Rittenhouse Archives issued with Gold Foil variant cover for Memorabilia Show, Birmingham, UK (only 300 copies)	Rittenhouse Archives
Vol. 23, No. 6	Dec 2012/Jan 2013	Promo 002 - NSU Marvel Super Hero Squad	NSU Exclusive	Upper Deck
Vol. 24, No. 1	Feb/Mar 2013	P1 The Walking Dead Trading Cards Set 2	NSU Exclusive	Cryptozoic Entertainment
Vol. 24, No. 1	Feb/Mar 2013	Promo Card 1 Stax Baseball Stars Series One	NSU Exclusive	Stax Trading Card Company
Vol. 24, No. 1	Feb/Mar 2013	P2 Star Trek The Original Series Heroes and Villains Trading Cards	NSU Exclusive	Rittenhouse Archives
Vol. 24, No. 2	Apr/May 2013	P1 Superman: The Legend	NSU Exclusive	Cryptozoic Entertainment
Vol. 24, No. 2	Apr/May 2013	P2 Game of Thrones Season Two	NSU Exclusive	Rittenhouse Archives
Vol. 24, No. 2	Apr/May 2013	P1 Revenge Season 1	NSU Exclusive	Cryptozoic Entertainment
Vol. 24, No. 3	Jun/Jul 2013	P1 Once Upon A Time Season 1	NSU Exclusive	Cryptozoic Entertainment
Vol. 24, No. 3	Jun/Jul 2013	Unnumbered American Horror Story	NSU Exclusive	Breygent Marketing
Vol. 24, No. 3	Jun/Jul 2013	P2 Star Trek TNG: Heroes & Villains Trading Cards	NSU Exclusive	Rittenhouse Archives
Vol. 24, No. 4	Aug/Sep 2013	P1 The Big Bang Theory Season 5	NSU Exclusive	Cryptozoic Entertainment
Vol. 24, No. 4	Aug/Sep 2013	488P Star Wars Galactic Files Series 2	NSU Exclusive	Topps
Vol. 24, No. 4	Aug/Sep 2013	P2 True Blood Archives	NSU Exclusive	Rittenhouse Archives
Vol. 24, No. 4	Aug/Sep 2013	P1 The Women of Legend	NSU Exclusive	Cryptozoic Entertainment
Vol. 24, No. 5	Oct/Nov 2013	NSU 1 of 2 The Walking Dead Season 3 Set 1	NSU Exclusive	Cryptozoic Entertainment
Vol. 24, No. 5	Oct/Nov 2013	P2 Women of Marvel Series 2 6 Gals Standing Promo	NSU Exclusive	Rittenhouse Archives
Vol. 24, No. 5	Oct/Nov 2013	NSP-02 Fringe Seasons 3 & 4		Cryptozoic Entertainment
Vol. 24, No. 5	Oct/Nov 2013	P5 The Art of Robert Aragon	NSU Exclusive	MNS Cards
Vol. 24, No. 6	Dec 2013/Jan 2014	P1 The Hobbit: An Unexpected Journey	NSU Exclusive	Cryptozoic Entertainment
Vol. 24, No. 6	Dec 2013/Jan 2014	P1 Breaking Bad	NSU Exclusive	Cryptozoic Entertainment
Vol. 25, No. 1	Feb/Mar 2014	P2 Star Trek Movies	NSU Exclusive	Rittenhouse Archives
Vol. 25, No. 1	Feb/Mar 2014	P2 of 2 Wax Packs	NSU Exclusive	Secret Audio Club
Vol. 25, No. 1	Feb/Mar 2014	Unnumbered The Art of Kevin Seconds	NSU Exclusive also a randomly inserted foil version!	MHopOnHop
Vol. 25, No. 1	Feb/Mar 2014	Promo 2, Promo 3 Legendary Lovecraft were randomly inserted	NSU Exclusive	Monsterwax
Vol. 25, No. 1	Feb/Mar 2014	NSU 2 of 2 The Walking Dead Season 3	NSU Exclusive	Cryptozoic Entertainment
Vol. 25, No. 2	Apr/May 2014	Unnumbered Captain America: The Winter Soldier	NSU Exclusive	Upper Deck
Vol. 25, No. 2	Apr/May 2014	P1 Adventure Time	NSU Exclusive	Cryptozoic Entertainment
Vol. 25, No. 2	Apr/May 2014	P2 Game of Thrones: Season Three	NSU Exclusive	Rittenhouse Archives
Vol. 25, No. 2	Apr/May 2014	P1 Ender's Game	NSU Exclusive	Cryptozoic Entertainment
Vol. 25, No. 2	Apr/May 2014	Unnumbered Legendary: Paint The Town Red	NSU Exclusive	Upper Deck
Vol. 25, No. 3	Jun/Jul 2014	P2 Star Trek: TOS Portfolio Prints	NSU Exclusive	Rittenhouse Archives
Vol. 25, No. 3	Jun/Jul 2014	P3 Castle Seasons 3 & 4	NSU Exclusive	Cryptozoic Entertainment
Vol. 25, No. 3	Jun/Jul 2014	P1 DC Comics Epic Battles	NSU Exclusive	Cryptozoic Entertainment
Vol. 25, No. 3	Jun/Jul 2014	Unnumbered Marvel Premier	NSU Exclusive	Upper Deck
Vol. 25, No. 3	Jun/Jul 2014	P00, P01, P02, P03, P04 Beauty & The Myth were randomly inserted	NSU Exclusive	Braiiinz! Publishing
Vol. 25, No. 4	Aug/Sep 2014	P1 The Hobbit: The Desolation of Smaug	NSU Exclusive	Cryptozoic Entertainment
Vol. 25, No. 4	Aug/Sep 2014	Unnumbered Legendary Encounters: An ALIEN Deck Building Game	NSU Exclusive	Upper Deck
Vol. 25, No. 4	Aug/Sep 2014	P2 Under the Dome: Season One Trading Cards	NSU Exclusive	Rittenhouse Archives
Vol. 25, No. 4	Aug/Sep 2014	Promo 1 thru Promo 4 Chronicles of The Three Stooges were randomly inserted	NSU Exclusive	RRParks Cards
Vol. 25, No. 4	Aug/Sep 2014	P2 Adventure Time	NSU Exclusive	Cryptozoic Entertainment
Vol. 25, No. 5	Oct/Nov 2014	P1 Sleepy Hollow Season 1	NSU Exclusive	Cryptozoic Entertainment
Vol. 25, No. 5	Oct/Nov 2014	Unnumbered Marvel Masterpieces	NSU Exclusive	Upper Deck
Vol. 25, No. 5	Oct/Nov 2014	Promo 2, Promo 3 Monsters & Maniacs were randomly inserted	NSU Exclusive	Monsterwax
Vol. 25, No. 5	Oct/Nov 2014	Promo 1 thru Promo 4 Chronicles of The Three Stooges Series Two were randomly inserted	NSU Exclusive	RRParks Cards
Vol. 25, No. 6	Dec 2014/Jan 2015	P1 Downton Abbey Series 3 & 4	NSU Exclusive	Cryptozoic Entertainment
Vol. 25, No. 6	Dec 2014/Jan 2015	P1 DC Comics Super Villains	NSU Exclusive	Cryptozoic Entertainment
Vol. 25, No. 6	Dec 2014/Jan 2015	P2 Dangerous Divas Series 2	NSU Exclusive	Rittenhouse Archives
Vol. 25, No. 6	Dec 2014/Jan 2015	P3 The Melty Misfits 2nd Series	NSU Exclusive	Maraschino Distribution LLC
Vol. 25, No. 6	Dec 2014/Jan 2015	Promo Card 1 thru Promo 4 The Monster Times were randomly inserted	NSU Exclusive	RRParks Cards
Vol. 26, No. 1	Feb/Mar 2015	1 of 18 thru 18 of 18 Bench Warmer Dreamgirls were randomly inserted	NSU Exclusive	Bench Warmer
Vol. 26, No. 1	Feb/Mar 2015	Promo Card 1 thru Promo Card 5 Basil Wolverton Barflyze were randomly inserted	NSU Exclusive	RRParks Cards
Vol. 26, No. 1	Feb/Mar 2015	CP1 Arrow Season 1	NSU Exclusive	Cryptozoic Entertainment
Vol. 26, No. 1	Feb/Mar 2015	P2 Sleepy Hollow Season 1	NSU Exclusive	Cryptozoic Entertainment
Vol. 26, No. 2	Apr/May 2015	P2 Game of Thrones Season 4	NSU Exclusive	Rittenhouse Archives
Vol. 26, No. 2	Apr/May 2015	P1 Sons of Anarchy Seasons 4 & 5	NSU Exclusive	Cryptozoic Entertainment
Vol. 26, No. 2	Apr/May 2015	Promo NSU Bates Motel Season 2	NSU Exclusive	Breygent Marketing
Vol. 26, No. 2	Apr/May 2015	Promo 1 thru Promo 10 Chronicles of The Three Stooges Series 3 were randomly inserted	NSU Exclusive	RRParks Cards
Vol. 26, No. 3	Jun/Jul 2015	P2 Star Trek: Voyager Heroes & Villains	NSU Exclusive	Rittenhouse Archives
Vol. 26, No. 3	Jun/Jul 2015	P1 Ghostbusters	NSU Exclusive	Cryptozoic Entertainment
Vol. 26, No. 3	Jun/Jul 2015	KS1 Mars Attacks: Occupation	NSU Exclusive	Topps
Vol. 26, No. 3	Jun/Jul 2015	P1 Arrested Development	NSU Exclusive	Cryptozoic Entertainment
Vol. 26, No. 4	Aug/Sep 2015	IX thru XXI Penny Dreadful Season 1 Tarot cards were randomly inserted	NSU Exclusive	Cryptozoic Entertainment
Vol. 26, No. 4	Aug/Sep 2015	P1 Outlander Season 1	NSU Exclusive	Cryptozoic Entertainment
Vol. 26, No. 4	Aug/Sep 2015	Promo Card 1 thru Promo Card 4 Chronicles of The Three Stooges Series 4 were randomly inserted	NSU Exclusive	RRParks Cards
Vol. 26, No. 5	Oct/Nov 2015	P1 Orphan Black Season 1	NSU Exclusive	Cryptozoic Entertainment
Vol. 26, No. 5	Oct/Nov 2015	P5, P6 The Hobbit: The Battle of the Five Armies were randomly inserted	NSU Exclusive	Cryptozoic Entertainment
Vol. 26, No. 5	Oct/Nov 2015	Unknown RRParks CARDS	NSU Exclusive Promo cards for several different Halloween related RRParks CARDS released were randomly inserted	RRParks Cards
Vol. 26, No. 6	Dec 2015/Jan 2016	P2 Agents of S.H.I.E.L.D. Season Two	NSU Exclusive	Rittenhouse Archives
Vol. 26, No. 6	Dec 2015/Jan 2016	P7, P8, P9 The Hobbit: The Battle of the Five Armies were randomly inserted	NSU Exclusive	Cryptozoic Entertainment
Vol. 26, No. 6	Dec 2015/Jan 2016	Promo Card One, Promo Card Two, Promo Card Three Japanese Horror Yoshitoshi 3D Card Series were randomly inserted	NSU Exclusive	RRParks Cards
Vol. 27, No. 1	Feb/Mar 2016	P1, P2, P3 Walking Dead Season 4 Part 1 were randomly inserted	NSU Exclusive	Cryptozoic Entertainment
Vol. 27, No. 1	Feb/Mar 2016	P3-A Blood Drive: The Parody Collection	NSU Exclusive	Dead of Night Entertainment
Vol. 27, No. 1	Feb/Mar 2016	Promo Card 1 thru Promo Card 4 Chronicles of the Three Stooges Series 5 were randomly inserted	NSU Exclusive	RRParks Cards
Vol. 27, No. 2	Apr/May 2016	P4, P5 Walking Dead Season 4 Part 2 were randomly inserted	NSU Exclusive	Cryptozoic Entertainment
Vol. 27, No. 2	Apr/May 2016	P3, P4 Outlander Season 1 were randomly inserted	NSU Exclusive	Cryptozoic Entertainment
Vol. 27, No. 2	Apr/May 2016	P2 2016 James Bond Classic	NSU Exclusive	Rittenhouse Archives
Vol. 27, No. 2	Apr/May 2016	Promo Chronicles of the Grim Reaper/Chronicles of the Three Stooges Series 5		
Vol. 27, No. 2	Apr/May 2016	NSU Exclusive Double Sided Card		RRParks Cards
Vol. 27, No. 3	Jun/Jul 2016	DC7-P1, DC7-P2, DC7-P3, DC7-P4, DC7-P5, DC7-P6 Batman Classic TV Series Cryptomium Reissue cards were randomly inserted	NSU Exclusive	Cryptozoic Entertainment
Vol. 27, No. 3	Jun/Jul 2016	P2 Game of Thrones Season Five	NSU Exclusive	Rittenhouse Archives
Vol. 27, No. 4	Aug/Sep 2016	P2 Star Trek The Next Generation Portfolio Prints Trading Cards Series Two	NSU Exclusive	Rittenhouse Archives
Vol. 27, No. 4	Aug/Sep 2016	P2 Gotham Before the Legend Trading Cards Season 1	NSU Exclusive	Cryptozoic Entertainment
Vol. 27, No. 5	Oct/Nov 2016	P1 Arrow Season 3	NSU Exclusive	Cryptozoic Entertainment
Vol. 27, No. 5	Oct/Nov 2016	No 1 of 25 thru No 25 of 25 '59 Three Stooges Reissue Series were randomly inserted	NSU Exclusive	RRParks Cards
Vol. 27, No. 5	Oct/Nov 2016	Promo Card 1 thru Promo Card 4 Happy Halloween were randomly inserted	NSU Exclusive	RRParks Cards
Vol. 27, No. 5	Oct/Nov 2016	The Mob [card appears to be a base card and it is not marked as a promo] Historic Autographs		
Vol. 27, No. 5	Oct/Nov 2016	P4 Star Trek 50th Anniversary Trading Cards	NSU Exclusive in Star Wars	
Vol. 27, No. 6	Dec 2016/Jan 2017	Cover Image on the "Light Side" [Heroes]		Rittenhouse Archives
Vol. 27, No. 6	Dec 2016/Jan 2017	Promo Card 1 thru Promo Card 4 Basil Wolverton II: Wolverton's Women were randomly inserted	NSU Exclusive - Star Wars Cover Image on the "Light Side" [Heroes]	RRParks Cards
Vol. 27, No. 6	Dec 2016/Jan 2017	P1 Sequentially numbered /999 Star Wars Rogue One Mission Briefing	NSU Exclusive in Variant Cover: Star Wars Cover Image on the "Dark Side" [Villains] MCM Birmingham Comic Con Nov 2016	Topps
Vol. 28, No. 1	Feb/Mar 2017	Promo Card 1 thru Promo Card 9 Mystery Science Theatre were randomly inserted	NSU Exclusive	RRParks Cards
Vol. 28, No. 2	Apr/May 2017	NSU Fleer Ultra Spiderman	NSU Exclusive	Upper Deck
Vol. 28, No. 2	Apr/May 2017	P1, P2, P3, P4 Gotham Series 2 were randomly inserted	NSU Exclusive	Cryptozoic Entertainment
Vol. 28, No. 2	Apr/May 2017	P1 The Flash Season 2	NSU Exclusive	Cryptozoic Entertainment
Vol. 28, No. 3	Jun/Jul 2017	P4, P5, P6 Outlander Season Two were randomly inserted	NSU Exclusive	Cryptozoic Entertainment
Vol. 28, No. 3	Jun/Jul 2017	P4 Catwoman DC Comics Bombshells	NSU Exclusive	Cryptozoic Entertainment
Vol. 28, No. 4	Aug/Sep 2017	Promo Card 1, Promo Card 2, Promo Card 3, Promo Card 4 Mystery Science Theatre Series were randomly inserted	NSU Exclusive	RRParks Cards
Vol. 28, No. 5	Oct/Nov 2017	Promo Card 1, Promo Card 2, Promo Card 3 Happy Halloween 2017 were randomly inserted	NSU Exclusive	RRParks Cards
Vol. 28, No. 5	Oct/Nov 2017	P2 Star Trek: Beyond Movie Trading Cards	NSU Exclusive	Rittenhouse Archives
Vol. 28, No. 5	Oct/Nov 2017	P1 Arrow Season 4	NSU Exclusive	Cryptozoic Entertainment
Vol. 28, No. 6	Dec 2017/Jan 2018	P1, P2, P3 Three Stooges were randomly inserted	NSU Exclusive	RRParks Cards
Vol. 29, No. 1	Feb/Mar 2018	P2 Star Trek: Deep Space Nine Heroes and Villains Rittenhouse Archives and P2 Rick and Morty		Cryptozoic Entertainment
Vol. 29, No. 2	Apr/May 2018	P4, P5, P6 Rick and Morty Cryptozoic Entertainment were randomly inserted and P2 Game of Thrones Season Seven		
Vol. 29, No. 3	Jun/Jul 2018	CPNS-1, CPNS-2 A Tiny Teddy Named Cuds 2 cards were randomly inserted		MNS Cards/Robert Aragon
Vol. 29, No. 3	Jun/Jul 2018	P2 Twin Peaks		Rittenhouse Archives
Vol. 29, No. 3	Jun/Jul 2018	P2 Star Trek TOS Captain's Collection		Rittenhouse Archives
Vol. 29, No. 3	Jun/Jul 2018	P3 Outlander Season 3		Cryptozoic Entertainment
Vol. 29, No. 4	Aug/Sep 2018	P4, P5, P6 Outlander Season Three were randomly inserted		Cryptozoic Entertainment
Vol. 29, No. 4	Aug/Sep 2018	P3 Sharknado	NSU Exclusive	RRParks Cards
Vol. 29, No. 4	Aug/Sep 2018	MANS-1 The Monstrous Art of Robert Aragon	NSU Exclusive	MNS Cards
Vol. 29, No. 5	Oct/Nov 2018	P4, P5, P6 Rick and Morty Season 2 were randomly inserted		Cryptozoic Entertainment
Vol. 29, No. 5	Oct/Nov 2018	LCP-2. LCP-3 The Chaney Legacy were randomly inserted	NSU Exclusive	MNS Cards
Vol. 29, No. 5	Oct/Nov 2018	Mystery Science Theatre 3000 II		RRParks Cards
Vol. 29, No. 6	Dec 2018/Jan 2019	Unnumbered Iconic Literature A Midsummer Night's Dream Promo Card	NSU Exclusive	Iconic Creations
Vol. 30, No. 1	Feb/Mar 2019	P1, P2, P3 Steven Universe were randomly inserted		Cryptozoic Entertainment
Vol. 30, No. 1	Feb/Mar 2019	P2 The Orville Season One		Rittenhouse Archives
Vol. 30, No. 2	Apr/May 2019	P02, P03, P06 CZX Super Heroes and Super-Villains were randomly inserted		Cryptozoic Entertainment
Vol. 30, No. 2	Apr/May 2019	P2 Star Trek Discovery Season One		Rittenhouse Archives
Vol. 30, No. 3	Jun/Jul 2019	P2, P3, P4 CZX Outlander were randomly inserted		Cryptozoic Entertainment
Vol. 30, No. 3	Jun/Jul 2019	P1 NSU, P2 NSU Zorro 100th Anniversary were randomly inserted	NSU Exclusive	RRParks Cards
Vol. 30, No. 4	Aug/Sep 2019	P4 Rick and Morty Season 3		Cryptozoic Entertainment
Vol. 30, No. 4	Aug/Sep 2019	P1 Funky Dates		Nick Neocleous Neo Cards
Vol. 30, No. 4	Aug/Sep 2019	NSU P1 Mystery Science Theatre III	NSU Exclusive	RRParks Cards
Vol. 30, No. 5	Oct/Nov 2019	P1 Lost in Space		Monsterwax
Vol. 30, No. 5	Oct/Nov 2019	P1 Halloween Trick or Treat		RRParks Cards
Vol. 30, No. 5	Oct/Nov 2019	4 Mystery Science Theatre III Sketch Card Promo		RRParks Cards
Vol. 30, No. 5	Oct/Nov 2019	P5 DC Comics Bombshells		Cryptozoic Entertainment
Vol. 30, No. 6	Dec 2019/Jan 2020	NSU Mars Attacks: Uprising	NSU Exclusive	SideKick Media
Vol. 31, No. 1	Feb/Mar 2020	Outlander Season 4		Cryptozoic Entertainment
Vol. 31, No. 1	Feb/Mar 2020	P1 Ultraman		RRParks Cards
Vol. 31, No. 2	Apr/May 2020	P2 The Twilight Zone Archives Trading Cards		Rittenhouse Archives
Vol. 31, No. 2	Apr/May 2020	Unnumbered The Way of the Sword	NSU Exclusive	Iconic Creations
Vol. 31, No. 2	Apr/May 2020	Manos: The Hands of Fate		RRParks Cards
Vol. 31, No. 3	Jun/Jul 2020	Zorro Series 2 P1 promo		
Vol. 31, No. 4	Aug/Sep 2020	Outlander: P5, P7, P8, P9		
Vol. 31, No. 5	Oct/Nov 2020	RRParksCards Halloween 2020 Promo #1	NSU Exclusive	RRParks Cards
Vol. 31, No. 5	Oct/Nov 2020	Nosferatu P1 have Non-Sport Update 30th Anniversary logos	NSU Exclusive	
Vol. 31, No. 5	Oct/Nov 2020	2020 Wolverine Marvel Masterpieces just has Non-Sport Update	NSU Exclusive	Upper Deck
Vol. 31, No. 6	Dec 2020/Jan 2021	One Series 4 promo card was randomly inserted: P1 with white border is "rare ... not really"; P2 green border is "more rare than p1"; P3 black border is "rare-ish"; P4 light greyish powder blue border is "almost scarce"; P5 red border is 'Scarce!"; P6 quasi darkish mauve purple is "REALLY scarce"; P7 old gold border is "WOW! SCARCE!"; P8 is common	NSU Exclusive	RRParks Cards
Vol. 32, No. 1	Feb/Mar 2021	P-BR Crisis On Infinite Earths		Cryptozoic Entertainment
Vol. 32, No. 1	Feb/Mar 2021	P4 Psycho Ape		RRParks Cards
Vol. 32, No. 2	Apr/May 2021	P1 Ultraman		RRParks Cards
Vol. 32, No. 2	Apr/May 2021	P3 Ultraman		RRParks Cards
Vol. 32, No. 2	Apr/May 2021	P1 The Art of Sketch Cards		
Vol. 32, No. 3	Jun/Jul 2021	P1 Zorro Series 2 promo	NSU Exclusive	
Vol. 32, No. 4	Aug/Sep 2021	P1 Three Stooges Lenticular Motion Cards		RRParks Cards
Vol. 32, No. 4	Aug/Sep 2021	P1, P2, P3 Cryptozoic CZX Middle Earth were randomly inserted		Cryptozoic Entertainment
Vol. 32, No. 5	Oct/Nov 2021	RR Parks Halloween Event	NSU Exclusive	RRParks Cards
Vol. 32, No. 6	Dec 2021/Jan 2022	Zorro Series Two	NSU Exclusive	RRParks Cards
Vol. 32, No. 6	Dec 2021/Jan 2022	Three Stooges Series Nine on one card, Promo 1B	NSU Exclusive	RRParks Cards
Vol. 33, No. 1	Feb/Mar 2022	History of the Roman Emperors Promo		RRParks Cards
Vol. 33, No. 2	Apr/May 2022	Ultraman Series Two promo		RRParks Cards
Vol. 33, No. 3	Jun/Jul 2022	Ultraman Series Two NSU Promo 5	NSU Exclusive	RRParks Cards
Vol. 33, No. 3	Jun/Jul 2022	CZX Middle-earth Promo (One of P4 Legolas (Bloom) and Arwen (Tyler), P5, P6 Bilbo (Martin Freeman))		Cryptozoic Entertainment
Vol. 33, No. 4	Aug/Sep 2022	Outlander (P6)		
Vol. 33, No. 4	Aug/Sep 2022	Nosferatu		
Vol. 33, No. 5	Oct/Nov 2022	Outlander Season 5 NSU1	NSU Exclusive	
Vol. 33, No. 5	Oct/Nov 2022	Richard Parks Halloween Event Promo Card 1		
Vol. 33, No. 5	Oct/Nov 2022	Mark Spears Monsters NSU-1	NSU Exclusive	
Vol. 33, No. 6	Dec 2022/Jan 2023	Ultraman Series 2 promo (2 types) - Promo 6		RRParks Cards
Vol. 33, No. 6	Dec 2022/Jan 2023	Drive-In Double Feature promo		RJF Image/Design
Vol. 34, No. 1	Feb/Mar 2023	P7 The Freak Brothers		
Vol. 34, No. 1	Feb/Mar 2023	P1 Ultraman Series 3	NSU Exclusive	RRParks Cards
Vol. 34, No. 1	Feb/Mar 2023	Edgar Allan Poe		
Vol. 34, No. 2	Apr/May 2023	Dragons - Promo 3		Long Dog Cards
Vol. 34, No. 3	Jun/Jul 2023	P1 Ancient Egypt: King Tut		Long Dog Cards/RRParks Cards
Vol. 34, No. 3	Jun/Jul 2023	6 Cardsmiths Promos: BP-1 Street Fighter Ibuki; BP-2 Street Fighter; BP-3 Killer Klowns from Outer Space; BP-4 Killer Klowns from Outer Space; BP-5 Bob Ross; BP-6 Bob Ross (Aurora's Dance)		Cardsmiths
Vol. 34, No. 3	Jun/Jul 2023	15 Historic Autograph & Card Co. Promos (1 of 500): Civil War: #8 Dummy Hoy born May 23, 1862; #14 Mark Twain Confederate Soldier; #14A Belle Boyd Confederate Spy; Flight: #25 Amelia Earhart; #29 Blue Angels; Famous Americans: Series 1: #117 John Sullivan; #? Employee's Pick: Edgar Allen Poe; Gilded Age: #278 Winston Churchill; Nikola Tesla; #? Victoria Pin-up; #50 Claude Monet; Mob 2: #213 Al Capone; Washington Chronicles: #34 Benjamin Franklin; 1918, End of the Great War: #189 Germany Signs Armistice; #326 Babe Ruth meets General Jack Pershing		RRParks Cards
Vol. 34, No. 4	Aug/Sep 2023	Allegiance: Avengers vs X-Men (AXP1 - Hope Summers)		
Vol. 34, No. 4	Aug/Sep 2023	Coffintooth (P1)		RRParks Cards
Vol. 34, No. 5	Oct/Nov 2023	P1 Maitland's Monsters - Nandor		RRParks Cards
Vol. 34, No. 5	Oct/Nov 2023	BP-7 Dragon's Lair		Cardsmiths
Vol. 34, No. 5	Oct/Nov 2023	P3 What We Do in the Shadows - Nadja		Cryptozoic Entertainment
Vol. 34, No. 6	Dec 2023/Jan 2024	P1 UFO Legend and Lore		
Vol. 34, No. 6	Dec 2023/Jan 2024	Unnumbered Ancient Egypt		
Vol. 35, No. 1	Feb/Mar 2024	P1 Dark Nights Metal		Cryptozoic Entertainment
Vol. 35, No. 1	Feb/Mar 2024	BP-8 Golden Girls		Cardsmiths
Vol. 35, No. 1	Feb/Mar 2024	P2 Picard Season 2 & 3		Rittenhouse Archives
Vol. 35, No. 1	Feb/Mar 2024	P1 Psycho Ape Part II	NSU Exclusive	RRParks Cards
Vol. 35, No. 1	Feb/Mar 2024	Moon Patrol Promo 011 (11 cards) - H.O.R. PROMO-008		House of Roulx
Vol. 35, No. 2	Apr/May 2024	P2 Dark Nights Metal		Cryptozoic Entertainment
Vol. 35, No. 2	Apr/May 2024	P-9 Currency (Series 3) Beckett		Cardsmiths
Vol. 35, No. 2	Apr/May 2024	P1 Pirates and Privateers Series 1		RRParks Cards
Vol. 35, No. 3	Jun/Jul 2024	P1 The Slasher Nurse		RRParks Cards
Vol. 35, No. 3	Jun/Jul 2024	P1, P2, or P3 Craniacs Series 1		
Vol. 35, No. 4	Aug/Sep 2024	Transformers 40th Anniversary (1 of 4 promos)		Dynamite
Vol. 35, No. 4	Aug/Sep 2024	P3 Adventure Time Playpaks Series 3		Cryptozoic Entertainment
Vol. 35, No. 4	Aug/Sep 2024	P2 Ultraman Series 3	NSU Exclusive	RRParks Cards
Vol. 35, No. 5	Oct/Nov 2024	One promo card was inserted: P1 Batman Hush [Common 4:5]; P2 Batman Hush (Black & White Line Cover) [Rare 1:5]		Cryptozoic Entertainment
Vol. 35, No. 5	Oct/Nov 2024	RR Parks 11th Annual Halloween Event		RRParks Cards
Vol. 35, No. 6	Dec 2024/Jan 2025	P2 A Christmas Story		Cryptozoic Entertainment
Vol. 35, No. 6	Dec 2024/Jan 2025	P1 Lost In Space		Monsterwax
Vol. 35, No. 6	Dec 2024/Jan 2025	BP9 Currency		Cardsmiths
Vol. 35, No. 6	Dec 2024/Jan 2025	P1 Trilogy of Horror (Coffintooth, Psycho Ape Part 2, Slasher Nurse)		RRParks Cards
Vol. 36, No. 1	Feb/Mar 2025	Promo Card #1 Pirates & Privateers Series Three		RRParks Cards
Vol. 36, No. 2	Apr/May 2025	P4, P5, or P6 Craniacs Series 2		
Vol. 36, No. 2	Apr/May 2025	Ultraman Series 4		
Vol. 36, No. 2	Apr/May 2025	Peanuts		
Vol. 36, No. 3	Jun/Jul 2025	P1 Boxers and Zombies		RRParks Cards
Vol. 36, No. 3	Jun/Jul 2025	P2 Foundation Seasons 1 & 2		Rittenhouse Archives
Vol. 36, No. 3	Jun/Jul 2025	P4 Batman Hush		Cryptozoic Entertainment
Vol. 36, No. 4	Aug/Sep 2025	P1 Time Bandits		Long Dog Cards
Vol. 36, No. 4	Aug/Sep 2025	P1 RR Parks 12th Annual Halloween Event		RRParks Cards
Vol. 36, No. 4	Aug/Sep 2025	P1 Creatures of Cosmos		Monsterwax
Vol. 36, No. 4	Aug/Sep 2025	P5 Peanuts Playpaks		Cryptozoic Entertainment
Vol. 36, No. 4	Aug/Sep 2025	P2 Game of Thrones The Great Houses		Rittenhouse Archives
Vol. 36, No. 5	Oct/Nov 2025	P2 RR Parks 12th Annual Halloween Event		RRParks Cards
Vol. 36, No. 5	Oct/Nov 2025	BP-10 Currency Series 5		Cardsmiths
Vol. 36, No. 5	Oct/Nov 2025	Monsterwax Salute to NSU	NSU Exclusive	
Vol. 36, No. 5	Oct/Nov 2025	P2 Star Trek Connections		Rittenhouse Archives
Vol. 36, No. 6	Dec 2025/Jan 2026	P2 Pirates and Privateers 4		RRParks Cards
Vol. 36, No. 6	Dec 2025/Jan 2026	P7, P8, or P9 Craniacs Series 3 by Ira Friedman		
Vol. 36, No. 6	Dec 2025/Jan 2026	One promo card was inserted: P2 A Charlie Brown Christmas Peanuts Playpaks [Common 6:7]; P2 Jurassic Park [Rare 1:7]		Cryptozoic Entertainment
