= High School of Art and Design =

Public high school in Manhattan, New York

Location
- 245 E 56th St, New York, NY 10022; Manhattan, New York 10022; United States; 40°45′32″N 73°57′58″W

Information
- Type: Public
- Established: November 2, 1936
- Oversight: New York City Department of Education
- Principal: Maximillian Re-Sugiura
- Grades: 9–12
- Campus type: Urban
- Colors: red yellow and blue
- Athletics conference: Public Schools Athletic League
- Website: www.artanddesignhs.org

The High School of Art and Design (commonly referred to as Art and Design or A&D) is a career and technical education high school in Manhattan, New York City. Founded in 1936 as the School of Industrial Art, the school moved to 1075 Second Avenue in 1960 and more recently, its Midtown Manhattan location on 56th Street, between Second and Third Avenues, in September 2012. High School of Art and Design is operated by the New York City Department of Education.

== History ==
On November 2, 1936, four art teachers began what was to become the High School of Art and Design, the School of Industrial Art, in a former Manhattan elementary school at 257 West 40th Street, which for a time had housed a WPA Federal Theatre Project locale. Initially, they used orange crates and plywood to make storage and desks. One of the co-founders, John B. Kenny, became principal in 1941. The school soon moved to 211 East 79th Street on the Upper East Side, the site of the former annex to Benjamin Franklin High School. In September 1960, the School of Industrial Art changed its name to the High School of Art and Design and moved to 1075 Second Avenue in east Midtown.

The 1936 school was first envisioned as a continuation school, that is, a school where children who had left school and gotten jobs attended for half days to continue their education, normally including vocational classes relevant to their current or possible future jobs. However, it opened as a vocational high school,

On November 8, 2004, a rally was scheduled on the occasion of the school's 68th anniversary. This was to include a press conference at which increased support of the school would be urged. On November 8, 2006, the school celebrated its 70th anniversary. The office of the mayor of New York City issued a proclamation making November 8 "High School of Art and Design Day".

== Academics and events ==
Applicants must take an entrance exam and present a portfolio to be accepted. Freshmen sample all art and design subjects before selecting a major for their sophomore, junior and senior years. Students at Art and Design receive two periods of art instruction per day, choosing from among eight art majors: cartooning, animation, architecture, graphic design, illustration, fashion, photography, and film/video.

Art and Design's Kenny Gallery, named for the school's founding principal, John B. Kenny, hosts monthly art exhibits of student work. The gallery is open to the public. The Black Box Theatre was donated by the Friends of Art and Design (FAD).

== Notable people ==
=== Faculty ===
Some members of the school's faculty became notable for their creative work outside teaching. These include:

- Daisy Aldan, (1923-2001), poet, actress, editor and translator
- Irv Docktor, fine artist and book illustrator
- Richard Deane Taylor, commercial artist, fine artist and book illustrator. Teacher of commercial art from 1963 through 1989 and was the acting chairman of the Art Department from 1980 through 1981.
- Frank Eliscu, designer and sculptor of the Heisman Memorial Trophy and other works of art
- Alvin Hollingsworth, comic book illustrator and fine artist
- Bel Kaufman, author of Up the Down Staircase
- Bernard Krigstein, painter, illustrator, cartoonist
- Tom Wesselmann, pop artist, famous for his "Great American Nude" series

=== Alumni ===
- 1937: Paul Winchell, ventriloquist, inventor, actor
- 1940: Violet Barclay, a pioneering female comic book artist
- 1940: Al Plastino, comic book illustrator, writer and editor
- 1940: Chic Stone, comic book illustrator
- 1941: Allen Bellman, comic book artist
- 1943: Carmine Infantino, comic book artist, editor, member Comic Book Hall of Fame
- 1943: Helmut Krone, art director
- 1943: Henry Wolf, graphic designer, art director and photographer
- 1944: Joe Orlando, comic book illustrator, Mad magazine associate publisher
- 1945: Tony Bennett, singer and painter
- 1945: Joe Giella, comic book illustrator
- 1945: Everett Raymond Kinstler, portrait artist
- 1946: Sy Barry, phantom comic strip & comic book illustrator
- 1946: Vladimir Kagan, furniture designer
- 1946: Al Scaduto, syndicated cartoonist
- 1947: Alex Toth, comic book illustrator, animator for Hanna-Barbera
- 1947: John Romita Sr., comic book illustrator
- 1949: Howard Beckerman, animator and author
- 1950: Dick Giordano, comic book illustrator
- 1950: Jules Maidoff, artist and founder of SACI (Studio Arts College International) in Florence, Italy
- 1951: Leo Dillon, adult and children's book illustrator
- 1951: Bill Kresse, syndicated cartoonist
- 1952: Eva Hesse, minimalist painter and sculptor
- 1952: Sam Scali, advertising-agency owner
- 1953: Peter Hujar, photographer
- 1953: Ronald Wayne, Apple Computer co-founder
- 1955: I. C. Rapoport, photojournalist
- 1956: Ralph Bakshi, animator, filmmaker
- 1956: John Johnson, TV news anchor, author and painter
- 1956: Barbara Nessim, illustrator and educator
- 1956: Regina Porter, fashion designer
- 1957: Bobby Weinstein, songwriter, member of the Songwriters Hall of Fame
- 1957: Phoebe Gilman, children's book author and illustrator
- 1959: Neal Adams, comic book illustrator
- 1959: Paul J. Pugliese, Time magazine cartographer
- 1960: Calvin Klein, fashion designer
- 1960: George Kuchar, cult filmmaker and director
- 1960: Antonio Lopez, fashion illustrator
- 1960: Gerard Malanga, poet, photographer and filmmaker
- 1960: William T. Williams, abstract painter
- 1961: Robert Volpe, painter and NYPD detective, the "Art Cop"
- 1962: Roscoe Orman, actor, author and artist, best known as "Gordon" on Sesame Street
- 1962: Simon Gaon, painter
- 1963: Ronnie Landfield, abstract painter
- 1963: Joey Skaggs, media prankster, performance artist
- 1963: Jim Simon, animator and artist
- 1963: Michael Steiner, abstract artist and sculptor
- 1963 Harry Roseman, sculptor, videographer, professor of art
- 1965: Jackie Curtis, Warhol film star, poet, playwright
- 1965: Art Spiegelman, Pulitzer Prize winning author and cartoonist
- 1967: Bert Monroy, digital art pioneer, author of books on Photoshop, Illustrator
- 1967: Eric Carr (Paul Charles Caravello), drummer in the rock band Kiss
- 1967: Frank Brunner, comic book illustrator
- 1967: Larry Hama, writer and comic book illustrator
- 1967: Ralph Reese, comic book illustrator
- 1967: Lenny White, jazz-funk drummer, member of Return to Forever
- 1967: Terry Winters, abstract painter and printmaker
- 1968: Candida Royalle, producer and director of couples-oriented erotic films
- 1968: John Steptoe, author and illustrator of children's books
- 1968: Robin Tewes, artist and painter
- 1968: Frank Verlizzo ("Fraver"), Drama Desk Award-winning designer of theater art
- 1969: Pat Cleveland, fashion model
- 1969: Harvey Fierstein, actor, playwright, gay activist
- 1970: Amy Heckerling, film director, writer, actress
- 1971: Lawrence Hilton-Jacobs, actor and singer
- 1971: Alan Kupperberg, cartoonist and illustrator
- 1971: Steven Meisel, fashion photographer
- 1971: Lynette Washington, jazz vocalist
- 1973: Lisa Jane Persky, actress.
- 1973: Tom Sito, animator, filmmaker, educator
- 1974: Manny Vega, painter, muralist, mosaicist
- 1975: SJK 171 (aka Steve the Greek), graffiti artist
- 1976: Eddie Velez, film and television actor
- 1976: Marcelino Sanchez, film and television actor
- 1976: Tracy 168 (Michael Tracey), graffiti artist
- 1976: Mike Carlin, comic book writer and editor
- 1977: Joe Jusko, comic book illustrator
- 1977: Gladys Portugues, champion body builder
- 1978: Lasana M. Sekou, poet, journalist, author, publisher
- 1978: Lorna Simpson, artist and photographer
- 1978: Margaret Matz, architect and illustrator
- 1978: Malcolm Jones III, comic book illustrator
- 1979: Denys Cowan, comic book illustrator
- 1979: Jimmy Palmiotti, inker and writer of comic books, games and film
- 1979: Mark Texeira, comic book illustrator
- 1980: Chris 'Daze' Ellis, graffiti writer and artist
- 1980: Nicole Willis, musician, artist
- 1981: Marc Jacobs, fashion designer
- 1982: Lady Pink (Sandra Fabara), graffiti writer, artist and muralist.
- 1983: Mare139 (Carlos Rodriguez), graffiti artist and designer
- 1983: Issa Ibrahim, outsider artist and musician.
- 1985: Roger Sanchez, Grammy Award-winning DJ, producer, recording artist
- 1985: Christopher Martin, rapper
- 1986: Pharoahe Monch (Troy Donald Jamerson), hip hop artist
- 1987: Ivan de Prume, former drummer in the groove metal band White Zombie
- 1990: Kwamé (Kwamé Holland), rapper and music producer
- 1990: Jamal Igle, comic book and animation storyboard artist
- 1992: Joe Madureira, comic book illustrator
- 1992: Mobb Deep, hip-hop duo
- 1995: Cool Calm Pete (Peter Chung), hip hop artist as a member of Babbletron and then as a Solo artist
- 1998: Fabolous, rapper
- 2006: ASAP Ferg (Darold D. Brown Ferguson Jr.), rapper and fashion designer
- 2007: LaQuan Smith, fashion designer
- 2014: Devon Rodriguez, artist and painter
