= Bill Kresse =

American cartoonist

William Joseph Kresse (June 17, 1933 – January 21, 2014) was an American cartoonist who drew the comic strip "Super" Duper, which was published in the New York Daily News in the 1960s and 1970s.

After graduating from New York City's High School of Art and Design, he began working for the animation studio Terrytoons, in New Rochelle, New York. He went on to design conveyor belt systems before obtaining a job in the art department of the news agency the Associated Press. He went on to become an illustrator and cartoonist at the New York Daily News, the New York Herald-Tribune and other newspapers. Kresse and Rolf Ahlsen created the comic strips "Super" Duper and Scratch, often signed under the joint credit Krahlsen.

Kresse received the National Cartoonists Society's 1974 Advertising and Illustration Award.

Kresse was married to Lorraine Kresse, who has been board president of their cooperative apartment house, Terrace View, in the Jackson Heights neighborhood of the New York City borough of Queens, and a member of Queens Community Board 3.

Kresse died on January 21, 2014, at New York Hospital Queens, in the Flushing neighborhood.
