= Jim Simon (artist) =

American cartoonist

- Born: James A. Simon; 1950 (age 75–76)
- Occupations: Artist; animator; director

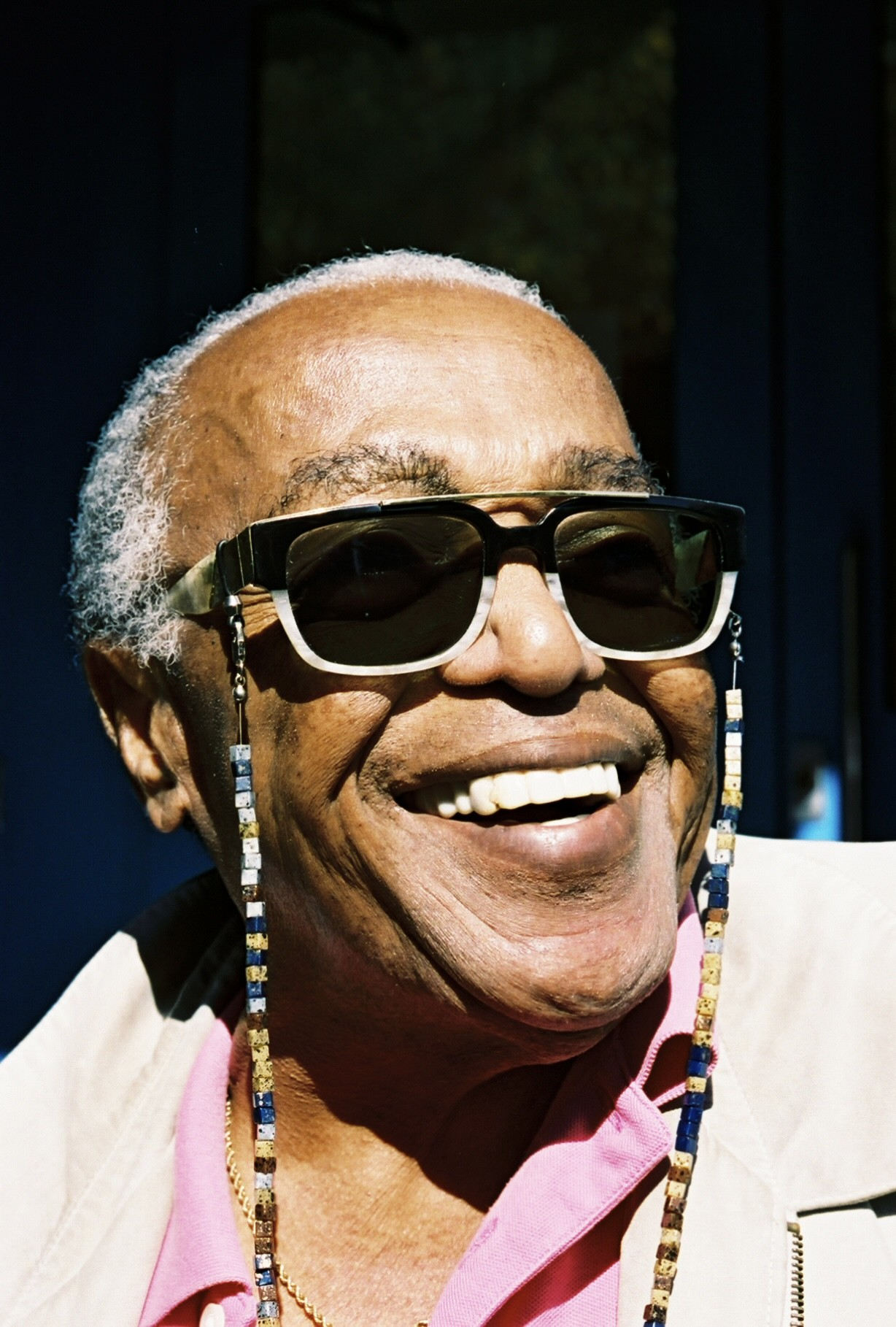

James A. Simon, also known as Jim Simon, is an artist and animator. With his animation company, Wantu Studios, he created animations for Sesame Street and other shows.

== Early life ==
Simon attended New York City's High School of Art and Design, graduating in 1963. There he had won an award for excellence in animation, and earned two scholarships from the Junior Epstein Memorial Foundation as well as a scholarship to the School of Visual Arts. At SVA, he initially pursued a career producing live action TV, but switched to animation.

== Career ==
After graduation, Simon began working as an animation background artist at Paramount Pictures' animation studio. It closed four months after he joined, but his time there had allowed him to join the animators' union. A Paramount colleague then brought Simon in as an assistant animator on the 1960s Spider-Man animated series.

After a year-and-a-half, Simon left in order to freelance, recalling in 1975 that, "I was turning out so much work, they had to promote me, because I was earning more money than some of the full-fledged animators. But it got to the point that I was just too excited about the things going on inside my own head, which I could not release while working for someone else."

Circa 1972, he formed Wantu Animation Inc., initially based in New York City and then Los Angeles. Simon's clients included the PBS children's educational series The Electric Company, for which his first short film, "Hey Diddle Diddle", won an award at the International Animated Film Association's 1975 Animation Awards Festival; WNET's children's educational series Vegetable Soup; Sesame Street; the Black Psychiatrists of America; and the New York Public Library.

== Personal life ==
By 1977, Simon and his wife René Simon had four sons: Jimmy, Kelly, Sean, and Mark. Simon and his wife had known each other since high school, and married while he was attending college.

In 2009, he said that some career setbacks "led me to a little depression, a little alcoholism and homelessness with me and my dog sleeping in the car." After not drawing for 10 years, he took up oil painting and had a show at the St. Clair gallery in El Cajon, California, near San Diego, where he was then living.
