= Catherine Murphy (artist) =

American painter

Catherine Murphy (born 1946, Cambridge, Massachusetts) is an American realist painter whose career began with the inclusion of her work in the 1971 Annual Exhibition of Painting and Sculpture at the Whitney Museum of American Art. A two-time recipient of the National Endowment of the Arts grant (1979 and 1989), Murphy has received numerous awards and honors for her work, including a Guggenheim Fellowship (1982) and most recently the Robert De Niro, Sr. Prize in 2013. She was a Senior Critic at Yale University Graduate School of Art for 22 years and is currently the Tepper Family Endowed Chair in Visual Arts at the Mason Gross School of the Arts at Rutgers.

Murphy lives and works in Poughkeepsie, New York. She is married to artist Harry Roseman.

== Biography ==
As a young girl, Catherine Murphy was always drawn to making art. In the third grade, her teacher allowed her to paint, paste and also draw on the blackboard in the back of the classroom. In interviews she recounts a moment in church when she was about 12. A visiting cardinal asked the children of the congregation if anyone had a vocation. Young Catherine raised her hand and said, "I'm going to be an artist when I grow up."

Growing up in Lexington, Massachusetts, Murphy had little exposure to art and visited an art museum for the first time during high school. In interviews Murphy often mentions how drawing and painting were a means to seek control over her world. Murphy studied at the Skowhegan School of Painting and Sculpture in Maine and graduated with a Bachelor of Fine Arts degree from Pratt Institute in 1967, where she was later awarded an honorary doctorate degree in 2006.

== Artistic practice ==
Murphy's drawings, prints and oil paintings, created solely through direct observation, are highly detailed depictions of people, objects and spaces. Using natural light, her meticulously composed setups are often rendered at a scale larger than the original subject. One painting can take several years to complete. Murphy has said of her work that she is trying to "slow things down" in her paintings, that "my paintings are not about that one moment of seeing. My paintings are about time passing. Time is depicted in a very different way than most people even think about time- which is cinematically, and through the camera's eye."

With regard to the formal qualities of her work, Hilton Kramer wrote in 1975 that Murphy, not yet 30 years old, was in possession of a "firm pictorial mind", exhibiting a profound awareness of Modernism and Cubism while carrying "the realist impulse into a terrain all her own".

== Collections ==
Catherine Murphy's drawings, lithographs and oil paintings are in the following collections.

- The Art Institute of Chicago
- Cranbrook Art Museum
- The Fine Arts Museums of San Francisco
- The Maxine & Stuart Frankel Foundation for Art
- The Frye Art Museum
- The Georgia Museum of Art
- The Greenville County Museum of Art
- The Hirshhorn Museum and Sculpture Garden
- The Frances Lehman Loeb Art Center, Vassar College
- The Louis-Dreyfus Family Collection
- The Metropolitan Museum of Art
- The Museum of Fine Arts, Boston
- The Museum of Modern Art
- The Newark Museum
- The New Jersey State Museum
- The New York Public Library
- The Phillips Collection
- The Smithsonian American Art Museum
- The University of Michigan
