= Vegetable Soup (TV series) =

- Genre: Children's television series
- Written by: Yanna Kroyt Brandt; Terence Taylor; John L. Figueroa; Carolyn Miller; Jesús Papoleto Meléndez; Brumsic Brandon Jr. Lou Potter; Joan Griffiths; Lucille Clifton
- Directed by: George Bowers; Luis Soto; Al Brodax; Douglas Cheek; Frank S. Abbott; Ivan Cury
- Starring: Gordon Smith; Carla Pinza; Gary Goodrow; Kingman Hui
- Voices of: James Earl Jones; Bette Midler
- Opening theme: Vegetable Soup
- Composer: Bob Sakayama
- Country of origin: United States
- Original language: English
- No. of seasons: 2
- No. of episodes: 78

Production
- Executive producer: Yanna Kroyt Brandt
- Producers: Yanna Kroyt Brandt; Al Brodax; George Bowers; William Hetzer
- Editors: Paul Evans; Joe Staton
- Running time: 30 mins
- Production company: New York State Education Department, Bureau of Mass Communications

Original release
- Release: September 22, 1975 – December 14, 1978

Vegetable Soup is an American educational children's television program produced by the New York State Education Department that originally ran on PBS from September 22, 1975, to December 14, 1978. NBC concurrently broadcast the series on Sunday mornings, with at least some affiliates showing it along with NBC's regular Saturday morning cartoon lineup; this was a rare instance of a television program seen on both commercial and public television at the same time.

All 78 episodes of Vegetable Soup were digitized by the New York State Archives and made available online in the American Archive of Public Broadcasting. Episodes are made up of a mix of live action, cartoon, puppetry, and mixed-media segments.

WTBS in Atlanta aired the program from 1979 to 1983.

== Concept ==
The purpose of the program was to be a television series for children to help counter the negative, destructive effects of racial prejudice and racial isolation and to reinforce and dramatize the positive, life-enhancing value of human diversity in entertaining and affective presentations that children could understand and relate to. Vegetable Soup used an interdisciplinary approach to entertain and educate elementary age children in the value of human diversity.

The show combined music, animation, puppetry and live action film, on the subject of economic, racial and ethnic diversity.

== Regular segments ==
- The Big Game Hunt - hosted by Gary Goodrow
- The Big Job Hunt - hosted by Susan Taylor (Season Two only)
- Children's Questions
- How Do You Find Yourself?
- Know Yourself
- Long Ago
- Luther
- Make A New Friend
- Mr. Emeritus
- Nigel
- Outerscope 1 (Called Outerscope II in season two)
- Real People
- Storytelling Time
- Superlative Horse
- What Do You Want To Be When You Grow Up?
- What Would You Do?
- Woody the Spoon Recipes
- Words Have Stories

== Outerscope ==
Outerscope was a serialized puppet adventure that opened each episode and ended on a cliffhanger. Its aim was to teach children to recognize justice and to reject unfair treatment.

In the first season, Outerscope I, five puppet children from Earth, Edgar, Cynthia, Eleanor, Willie and Henry, and their cat Betty build a homemade spaceship from a pile of planks in Edgar's backyard. The ship, a teepee-like cone of wooden planks with a bicycle wheel for a window, is topped by two umbrellas. The children fuel it with yeast, sugar and water, using a solution devised by one of the girls, and take off to play space explorers. They become lost in space and land on a series of worlds that serve as parables about prejudice.

- Sani-Land: King Scrub and Queen Polish and an army of nail files and toothbrushes accuse the children of being dirty, telling them, "If you were clean, you would look like us." The Sani-Landers are about to steam-clean them when they see Betty washing herself, and while they stare in amazement the children escape.
- Technovek: The machines here talk and have feelings. The children argue over whether to accept the machines' help, decide the map they are given is a trick, and follow it backwards.
- The Tree-Treats and the Yun-Yuns: A rainbow leads them to a land where the orange-like Tree-Treats make the onion-like Yun-Yuns perform minstrel shows that make them laugh at and hate themselves, while the shows make the Tree-Treats feel powerful and vain. The children trick the two groups into briefly trading places, and the Tree-Treats see how unfairly they have acted.
- Bakaland: This house in space has upside-down furniture, and its people say the opposite of what they mean ("May we harm you?"). The children work out how to talk with them so they can ask directions.
- Rurus: A monster called Hategut pulls the ship down onto a planet where two warring groups blame each other for robberies. The children discover that the thief is the lonely Hategut. He is befriended, a truce is called, and he helps rebuild the ship.
- Vocaville: The children's last stop. On the flight home they pass each planet and recount what they learned.

The serial ran through the first 31 programs, and the series' 1975 evaluation found the response to it "universally positive". The puppets were redesigned for the second season after some viewers found their humanlike heads and hands odd. In Outerscope II the children search for an ancient gold medallion, meeting real people who give them clues, in episodes set at a seaport, aboard the Peking, at a circus, in Chinatown and Brooklyn, at Ballet Hispanico and at the West Indian Day Parade. Daniel Stern, credited as Danny Stern, appeared in the second-season segments. The producer Yanna Kroyt Brandt also wrote a 1976 tie-in book, The Adventures of Outerscope I.

== Characters ==
- Long John Spoilsport (James Earl Jones) - regularly appeared on "The Big Game Hunt" and "The Big Job Hunt" segments
- Larry Hama - hosted various segments
- Kingman Hui - child actor who starred on the "Long Ago" segment
- Martin Harris (Martin Brayboy) - regularly appeared in the "Nigel" segment
- Eddie (Edward M. Beckford, Jr.) - regularly appeared in the "Nigel" segment, sang the opening theme song
- Scot Richardson (Scot Smith) - regularly appeared in the "Nigel" segment
- Bob (Daniel Stern) and Robin (Judy Noble) - regularly appeared in the "Outerscope" segment
- Woody the Spoon (Bette Midler) - regularly appeared in the "Woody the Spoon Recipes" segment

== Animations ==
Animated segments on the show were created by Jim Simon's Wantu Studios, the musical opening plus 13 Woody the Spoon cooking spots for which Bette Midler did all the voice tracks, and also 48 thirty-second breaks.

Beginning in the show's second season, many animated segments were also produced by Colossal Pictures, of which Vegetable Soup was one of its first assignments. Animators Drew Takahashi and Gary Gutierrez worked on Vegetable Soup during its first season, prior to Colossal Pictures' founding.
