= Simon Gaon =

American artist

Simon Gaon (born 1943) is an American painter, Expressionist, and action painter. He is best known for his intense, tempestuous, action oriented paintings of the cityscape. He was also a co-founder of the Street Painters, a group of eight New York City artists who painted directly from the city life they observed on the streets of America's largest city.

== Early life and education ==
Born in 1943 in Manhattan, Gaon at an early age displayed creative talents. By age 16, he began painting while attending the Roosevelt School in Stamford, Connecticut. A key influence on him was painter Arthur Bressler (1927–1975) who was Gaon's teacher and mentor. Gaon graduated from the High School of Art and Design in New York City. In 1962, Gaon won the art studio award scholarship from the high school of Art and design. which allowed him to study at the Art Students League of New York. In 1964, he studied in Academia 63 in Haarlem, the Netherlands, and furthered his European education with the Art Students League Scholarship. In 1966 he won the Edward G. McDowell traveling scholarship that allowed him to return to Europe. In 1968 he had a one-man show at the Art Student League that was part of the traveling scholarship. He later stayed more than ten years in Europe, primarily in Paris, where his style evolved. The works of the painters: Derain, Vlaminck as well as Soutine, Kokoschka, and especially Van Gogh have all strongly influenced his work.

== Gaon's philosophy and style ==
In his work, Gaon is influenced more by his temperament than intellectualism. He prefers to take risks, and edit later, putting the living experience of painting at the forefront of his craft. As an action painter, he immerses himself physically in his art, using pigment, emotion, and poetry to reinvent nature in a personal way. He paints nature and the city with abandonment and freedom, harnessing the different layers of the subconscious to help form the painting. However, life in all its energy and contradiction remains his inspiration. Subjects of his art include the night, the stormy sea, and the frenetic, carnival-like neon-lit city.

== Art ==
Gaon is most famous for his Time Square series, (1998) displaying the chaos and confusion of city. His depictions of the locale have been called dizzying, disorienting and even mind-boggling. His works manifest the vitality, wildness, diverseness, and hysterical quality of the urban setting, ever expanding to the point of explosion. Gaon's chaotic Time Square, helps him, as an artist, express the contradictory life forces that live within him.

Gaon also focuses on those who live on the urban periphery, the street people, immigrants, and prostitutes. His paintings go beyond the immediate perception of these subjects, to uncover the inherent contradictions both in his subjects psyche and social position, and in his own consciousness. His subjects display a noble and prophetic character, as if spiritually from a bygone era, yet awkwardly entrenched in a harsh contemporary reality.

== Museums and collections ==
- Museum of Jewish Art Hechal Shlomo Jerusalem Israel ( Rabbi from Bukhara )
- Museum Temple Emanu-El of New York
- Museum of the City of New York, New York
- New York Historical Society, New York
- Yeshiva University Museum, New York
- Hudson River Museum, New York
- Queen's College Museum
- West Valley Art Museum, Surprise, Arizona

Art Students League, New York White and Case, New York France Loisirs, Paris, France Millennium Hotel, New York Carrot Capital, LLC, New York

== Exhibitions ==
- 2025 Venezia, Italy Galleria Alice Schanzer
- 2024'MUSEO PALAZZO DOEBBING SUTRI (VT). Italy

2016

- Andrea Tardini Gallery, Venice
- Scuderie Aldobrandini, Rome

2015

- Espace Rachi Paris

2008

- Gallerie OPEN, Berlin, Germany
- Gallerie Rose, Hamburg, Germany

2007

- Berlin Capital Club, Berlin Germany

2006

- Famira Gallery, Sylt Germany
- Nabi Gallery

2005

- Dankert, Box, Meier, Rechtsanwalte (Law Offices) Berlin, Germany
- Peter Findlay Gallery, New York,
- NYTon Warndorff Gallery, Haarlem, The Netherlands
- Nabi Gallery, New York, NY
- Gallery Rose, Hamburg, Germany
- Famira Gallery, Sylt Germany

2004

- Jan Famira Gallery, Sylt, Germany

West Vallery Art

2003

- West Valley Museum, Surprise, Arizona

2002

- Ludvika Konsthall, Ludvika, Sweden

1999

- Galleri Rubens, Smedjebacken, Sweden
- Realismus Galerie, Kasel, Germany
- Galerie Rose, Hamburg, Germany

1997

- Galerie Peter Fischinger, Stuttgart, Germany

1995

- Galerie Peter Fischinger, Stuttgart, German
- Susan Conway Gallery, Washington, D.C.

1992

- Frank Bustamante Gallery, New York, NY

1991

- Galerie Le Chainon Manquant, Paris, France
- Loisits Corporate Offices, Paris, France

1990

- Galerie Peter Fischinger, Stuttgart, Germany
- Galerie Rose, Hamburg, Germany

1989

- The Exhibition Space, New York (sponsored by Ingber Gallery)

1988

- Inngber Gallery, New York, NY

1986

- Nicolas Roerich Museum, New York, NY

1974

- Galerie des Ambassadeurs, Paris, France

1968

- Art Students League, New York City
