= Phoebe Gilman =

Canadian-American children's book author and illustrator (1940–2002)

- Born: April 4, 1940; New York City, New York, U.S.
- Died: August 29, 2002 (aged 62); Toronto, Ontario, Canada
- Occupations: Writer, Illustrator
- Spouse: Brian Bender
- Writing career
- Genre: Children's literature
- Notable works: The Balloon Tree; Jillian Jiggs; Grandma and the Pirates; Something From Nothing
- Website: www.phoebegilman.com/home.html

Phoebe Gilman (April 4, 1940 – August 29, 2002) was a Canadian-American children's book author and illustrator. Her books were notable for their strong lead female characters. Her book Something from Nothing, adapted from an old Yiddish tale, won the 1993 Ruth Schwartz Award for best children's book, and was later adapted for television. Born in The Bronx, New York, where she lived her first years, she later lived in Europe, Israel, and finally settled in Canada in 1972.

== Early life ==
The second of three children, Phoebe Gilman was born to John and Hannah Gilman on April 4, 1940 in the Bronx. Her father was a textile worker originally and loved photography. Gilman cited her mother as the inspiration for her love of books, and she was an avid reader all her life.

She attended the School of Industrial Art, spent a brief time at Hunter College and went to Art Students League of New York. After this she travelled to Europe, where she lived in Rome for a short period before moving to Jerusalem, where she made a living making and selling paintings. She visited Montreal on her return to North America in the early 1970s before settling in Toronto, where she met her future husband Brian Bender, whom she married in 1974. Gilman taught for fifteen years at the Ontario College of Art.

== Literary career ==
Gilman recalled that seeing a balloon popped on a tree branch inspired her to write a story about a tree which grew balloons for fruit for her daughter Ingrid. However, her early efforts at getting her book published met with rejections, and it took her 15 years to see her book released in 1984 by Scholastic Inc. in Canada. Family also inspired her to write Wonderful Pigs of Jillian Jiggs, which was based on a time when Gilman's daughter and a friend went into 'business' making and selling mice bookmarks. Conversely, the 1992 story Something From Nothing is an adaptation of an old Yiddish tale. She also illustrated the children's books she wrote. She recalled spending ten years working on The Balloon Tree. Her stories often changed in development, for example Grandma and the Pirates started out as ''Grandma's Chocolate Chicken. Gilman reported that she grew to love the books she spent time working on, and missed them once they were finished and had been sent off to be published. She cheered herself up by inserting subtexts or references to older works in newer stories; for instance, a tiny copy of The Balloon Tree can be seen on the table in an illustration in Jillian Jiggs.

Gilman's books were notable for their strong female lead characters, but with a male lead character in Something from Nothing, that went on to win the 1993 Ruth Schwartz Award for best children's book, and was later made into a 2002 television special, produced by Funbag Studios and directed by Stefan Leblanc.

== Death ==
Phoebe Gilman died of leukemia in a Toronto hospital at age 62, two years after recovering from breast cancer. She was survived by her husband, Brian Bender, and three children, and two grandchildren. During her illness, she completed her last works, Jillian Jiggs and the Great Big Snow and The Blue Hippopotamus, though was unable to illustrate the latter work due to illness.

== Legacy ==
Phoebe Gilman Elementary Public School of the York Region District School Board opened in 2013 on Harvest Hills Boulevard in East Gwillimbury, York Region, Ontario.

== Bibliography ==
- The Balloon Tree Markham, Ontario: Scholastic, 1984.
- Jillian Jiggs Markham, Ontario: Scholastic, 1985.
- Little Blue Ben Markham, Ontario: Scholastic, 1986.
- Wonderful Pigs of Jillian Jiggs Markham, Ontario: Scholastic, 1987.
- Grandma and the Pirates Markham, Ontario: Scholastic, 1990.
- Once Upon a Golden Apple Toronto: Penguin, 1991. (illustrator)
- Something from Nothing Markham, Ontario: Scholastic, 1992.
- Jillian Jiggs to the Rescue Markham, Ontario: Scholastic, 1993.
- The Gypsy Princess North Winds Press, 1995.
- Pirate Pearl Scholastic Canada, 1998.
- Jillian Jiggs and the Secret Surprise North Winds Press, 1999.
- Jillian Jiggs and the Big Snow North Winds Press, 2000/2002.
