= Joe Jusko =

American artist (born 1959)

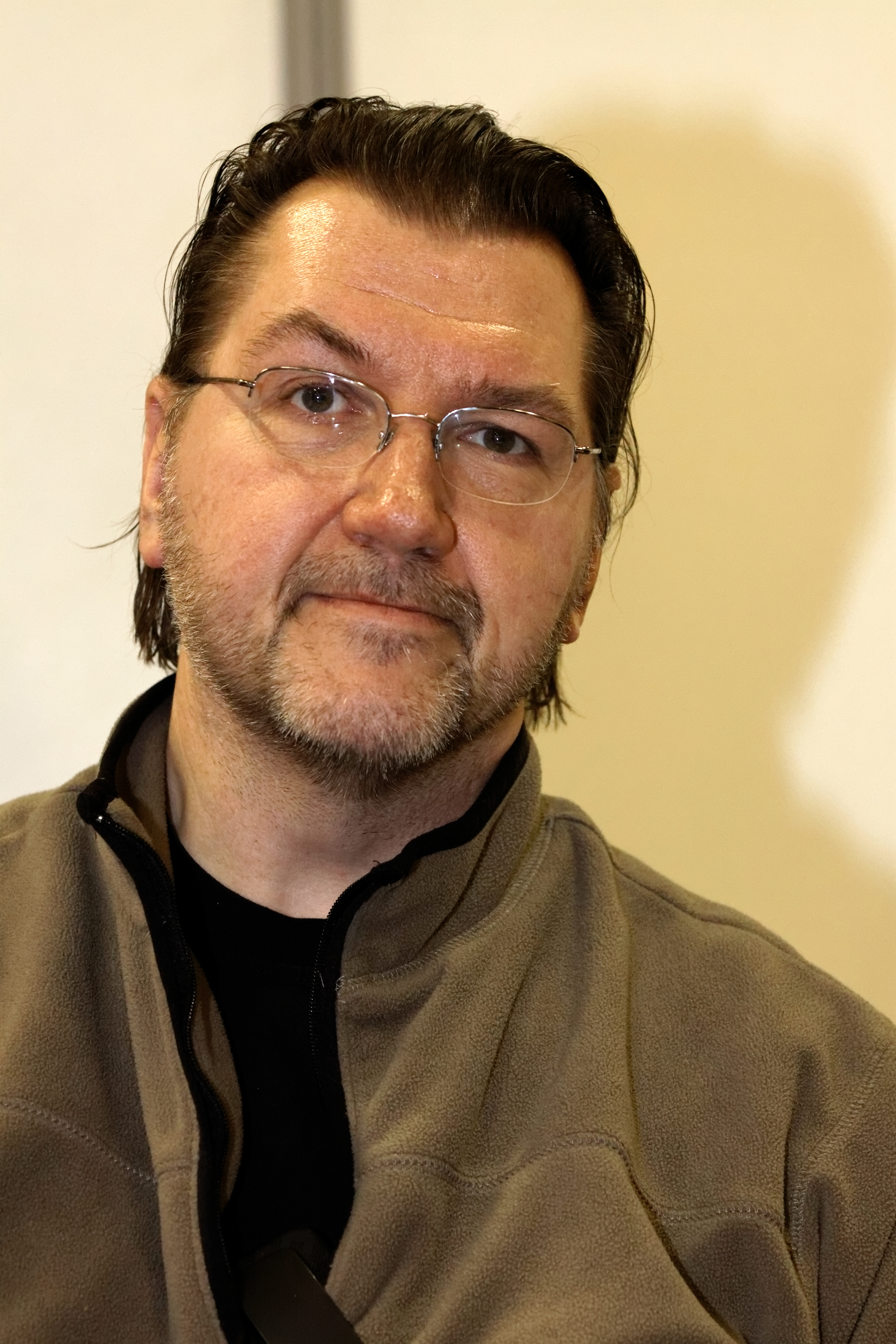
- Jusko at Paris Manga 2012
- Born: September 1, 1959 (age 67) New York City, New York, U.S.
- Area: Artist
- Notable works: Marvel Masterpieces; Savage Sword of Conan
- Awards: Comics Buyer's Guide Fan Award (1992, 1993); Wizard Fan Award (1993, 1994)

Joe Jusko (/ˈdʒʌskoʊ/; born September 1, 1959) is an American artist known for his realistic, highly detailed painted fantasy, pin-up, and cover illustrations, mainly in the comic book industry. Jusko painted the 1992 Marvel Masterpieces trading cards, the popularity of which has been credited with initiating the painted trading card boom of the 1990s.

== Early life ==
A third-generation Ukrainian-American, Joe Jusko was born in Manhattan's Lower East Side and grew up in New York City, the son of a construction worker and a homemaker. He attended the High School of Art and Design, where his instructors included Bernard Krigstein. He graduated in 1977 with the DC Comics Award of Excellence in Cartooning.

== Career ==
=== Comics ===
After graduating, Jusko worked as an assistant for five months for Howard Chaykin, which led to Jusko selling his first cover for Heavy Metal magazine at the age of 18. Forgoing college, Jusko went straight into commercial illustration.

Jusko has worked for almost every major comic-book publisher, producing hundreds of images for both covers and interiors. In addition to his long stint as one of the main cover artists for The Savage Sword of Conan, Jusko has painted every major Marvel Comics character, including the Hulk and the Punisher.

Jusko has also produced covers and interior art for many other comics companies and characters, including DC Comics, Crusade Comics, Innovation Comics, Harris Comics, Wildstorm Comics, Top Cow Productions, and Byron Preiss Visual Publications.

Besides the 1992 Marvel Masterpieces trading card set, Jusko painted the 1995 Art of Edgar Rice Burroughs trading cards. His work is featured in the 1996 card set Fleer's Ultra X-Men Wolverine Cards, 2016 Marvel Masterpieces, as well as Conan the Barbarian and Vampirella trading card sets.

Jusko produced the collection, The Art of Joe Jusko (Desperado Publishing, 2009), as well as a graphic novel adaptation of Steve Niles's supernatural detective Cal MacDonald.

Upper Deck announced a new Marvel Masterpiece series to go along with their 25th anniversary. Scheduled for the end of this year, Jusko, just like the original will be completing all new 135 base card images (1992's base card series contained 100 cards).

Jusko has also produced storyboards for ad agencies, for such notable clients as the World Wrestling Federation. Jusko provided the promotional poster artwork for WrestleMania VII in 1991.

In 2016 Jusko provided interior illustrations for the role-playing game Conan: Adventures in an Age Undreamed Of for Modiphius Entertainment.

In April 2022, Jusko was reported among the more than three dozen comics creators who contributed to Operation USA's benefit anthology book, Comics for Ukraine: Sunflower Seeds, a project spearheaded by editor Scott Dunbier, whose profits would be donated to relief efforts for Ukrainian refugees resulting from the February 2022 Russian invasion of Ukraine. Jusko, who joined the project in its second week, produced the art for the book's title page, commenting, "As a third generation Ukrainian American whose grandmother had her entire lineage erased during WWII, I am honored to contribute to this most important endeavor."

=== New York City police officer ===
At one point in his career, Jusko became "disillusioned with the lack of work . . . and became a [New York City] police officer. After several years I realized art was my main passion and went back to it full time. Luckily, the second time was a charm and my career took off." After the September 11, 2001, terrorist attacks, Jusko created the Police and Firefighter Heroes of September 11 lithograph, all proceeds of which went to the New York City Police and Fire Department Widows' and Orphans' Fund.

== Influences ==
Jusko noted in 2021 that Gold Key Comics cover artist George Wilson's "imagination and design sense both awe and inspire me to this day. Whether depicting a narrative scene or an ethereal montage of story elements, his covers always caught your attention, both through composition and one of the most imaginative and varied color senses I’ve ever seen."

== Awards ==
Jusko won the Comics Buyer's Guide Fan Award for Favorite Painter in 1992 and 1993, and the Wizard Fan Award for Favorite Painter in 1993 and 1994. His fully painted graphic novel Tomb Raider: The Greatest Treasure of All won a Certificate of Merit from the Society of Illustrators (which accepted Jusko as a member in 2007).

Comics for Ukraine: Sunflower Seeds to which Joe Jusko contributed a major painted work, won the 2024 Eisner Award for Best Anthology.

== Bibliography ==
- Joe Jusko's Art of Edgar Rice Burroughs (FPG, 1996 ISBN 978-1-887569-14-9)
- The Art of Joe Jusko (Desperado, 2009, ISBN 978-0-9795939-7-0)
- Vampirella: Blood Lust (Harris Comics, 1997) [Reprints Vampirella: Bloodlust #1-2 by Harris Comics]
- Vampirella Masters Series Volume 6: James Robinson (Dynamite Comics, 2011, ISBN 978-1-6069025-0-9) [Reprints Vampirella: Bloodlust #1-2 by Harris Comics]
- Classic Star Wars: A Long Time Ago... Volume 4: Screams In The Void (Dark Horse Comics, 2003) [Reprints Star Wars #58 by Marvel Comics]
- Star Wars Omnibus: A Long TIme Ago... Volume 3 (Dark Horse Comics, 2011, ISBN 978-15958263-9-8) [Reprints Star Wars #58 by Marvel Comics]
