= Frank Verlizzo =

American designer

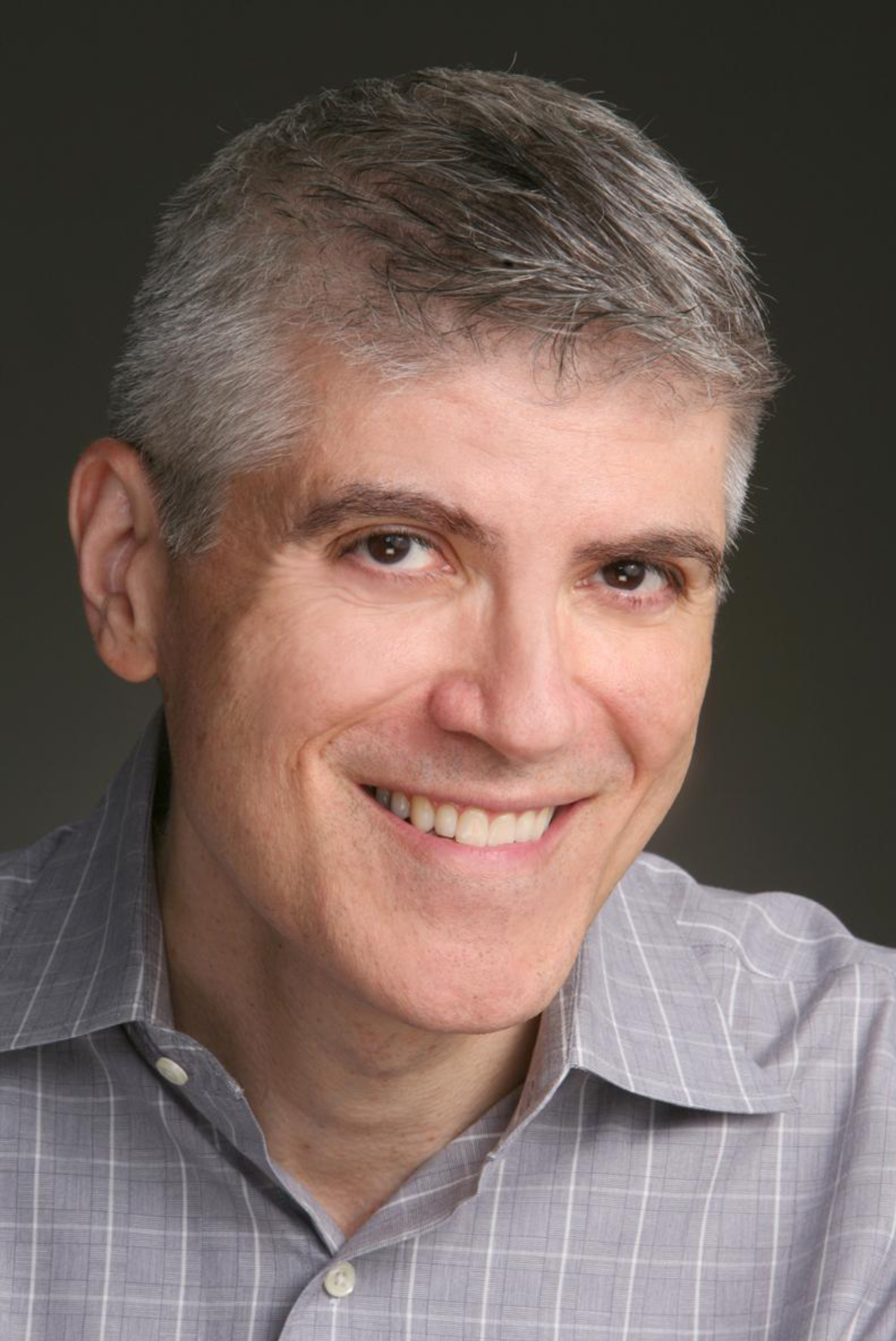
Frank "Fraver" Verlizzo

Frank "Fraver" Verlizzo is an American design artist and Drama Desk Award-winner. He is best known for creating the posters for many prominent Broadway productions, including the original productions of Stephen Sondheim's Sweeney Todd: The Demon Barber of Fleet Street and Sunday in the Park with George.

== Early life ==
Fraver is a native New Yorker, born in Manhattan and raised in the Bronx. He attended the High School of Art and Design and the Pratt Institute. It was at Pratt that he received his first big break in the theater industry, as his illustration teacher was David Edward Byrd, the man who designed the poster art for the original productions of the musicals Follies and Godspell. Byrd, seeing that Fraver's work largely centered on movies, suggested he visit The Blaine Thompson Agency, at the time the largest advertising agency for Broadway shows.

== Notable past work ==
=== Eileen ===
- Travesties (1975)
- The Night of the Iguana (revivals, 1976 and 1988)
- American Buffalo (1977 and 2000)
- The Merchant (1977)
- Otherwise Engaged (1977)
- Cheaters (1978)
- Deathtrap (1978)
- Sweeney Todd: The Demon Barber of Fleet Street (1979)
- Whose Life Is It Anyway? (1979)
- I Ought to Be in Pictures (1980)
- A Doll's Life (1982)
- Beyond Therapy (1982)
- "Master Harold"...and the Boys (1983)
- Total Abandon (1983)
- Baby (1984)
- Sunday in the Park with George (1984)
- As Is (1985)
- Loot (revival, 1986)
- Burn This (1987)
- Roza (1987)
- Spoils of War (1988)
- Michael Feinstein Piano and Voice (1990)
- An Inspector Calls (revival, 1995)
- David Copperfield: Dreams and Nightmares (1996)
- The Young Man From Atlanta (1997)
- The Glass Menagerie (revival, 1995)
- Getting Away With Murder (1996)
- The Lion King (1997)
- The Scarlet Pimpernel (1997)
- Electra (revival, 1998)
- It Ain't Nothin' But the Blues (1999)
- Waiting in the Wings (revival, 1999)
- Death and the Maiden (2002)
- Fortune's Fool (2002)
- Imaginary Friends (2002)
- Morning's At Seven (revival, 2002)
- Prymate (2004)
- Twelve Angry Men (2004)
- Little Women (2005)
- Primo (2005)
- Festen (2006)
- Twentieth Century (revival, 2004)
- Hot Feet (2006)
- The Threepenny Opera (revival, 2006)
- Journey's End (revival, 2007)
- The Story of My Life (2009)
- Looped (2010)

== Fraver.com ==
Fraver recently created Fraver.com, an educational website devoted to preserving his projects and the stories behind them.
