= Harry Roseman =

American sculptor

Harry Roseman (born 1945 in Brooklyn, New York) is a sculptor, photographer, draftsman, practitioner of web based works, and professor of art at Vassar College where he currently chairs the Department of Art.

In addition to having had many solo exhibitions, Roseman has produced a number of major commissioned public sculptures.

In 1990, the artist was commissioned to produce a sculpture for the Metropolitan Transportation Authority’s Arts for Transit program. Under the auspices of this public/private cooperative, Harry Roseman produced a 71-foot-long (22 m) bronze sculptural relief titled “Subway Wall”. The piece is a depiction of a landscape integrated within the architecture of the corridor and references aspects of its ascending and descending structure, located directly under the J.P. Morgan Chase headquarters at 60 Wall Street in New York City.

After four years in development, another sculpture titled “Curtain Wall” was installed in 2001 at the International Air Terminal at John F. Kennedy International Airport in NYC. The 600-foot-long (180 m) sculpture depicts cloth and curtains, suggesting wind movement, clouds, and the sky.

One prominent area of Harry Roseman’s career involves photographic images later adapted as web-based projects including “Self-Portraits”, “Visitors: a Journal”, and “Groups: a Web Project”.

“Visitors: a Journal” is a visual and verbal record starting in 1971 of those who have visited where Roseman lives including friends, relatives, workers (plumbers, etc.), door-to-door solicitors (Jehovah’s witness, etc.). “Groups: Friends and Acquaintances” began in 1956 but did not develop into an organized project until 1985. For many years the work lacked form. When transposed to the Internet, the new form intersected with the work itself, engendering “Groups: Individual Pages”. The art work serves as a cultural and social document. Its patterns have been tracking the intersecting lives of some participants for as long as thirty-eight years. These web-based works consist of thousands of photographs and are contained on the artist’s website.

Roseman is married to the painter Catherine Murphy.
