= Marvel Masterpieces =

Several subsequent sets of trading cards (1992–2008)

Marvel Masterpieces is the name of several subsequent sets of trading cards, printed during 1992–2008, depicting characters and events from Marvel Comics. Featuring large, vividly drawn card fronts and backs detailing trivia, each card showcased a different personality from Marvel's body of work.

There was also a set of pop-up cards, distributed in sets of six with the Marvel Activity Sets. They measured about 1 1/4 by 1 1/2 inches (3.2 by 3.8 cm).

== Series 1 – 1992 ==
The first set, which came out in 1992, consisted entirely of portraits painted by Joe Jusko and was published by Skybox. The set included 100 standard cards, and 5 "Battle" Spectra Cards. There was a factory-tin set of the cards which also contained 5 "Lost Marvel" cards that could only be found in those tins. There were 6 promo cards and 3 pre-production prototype cards too, which were only available to dealers and/or available as free with Wizard magazine (#13 Psylocke) and comics books (Marvel Age #118 Hulk) etc. The original promotion poster featured Spider-Man, which was Joe Juskos first painting of the series.

The artwork from series 1 was also released by Marvel as 4 collections printed at standard comic size, titled "The Marvel Masterpieces Collection (1–4)" allowing it to be seen in greater detail.

The production run of sealed boxes is 350,000 according to the gold-colored stickers (within the factory applied cellophane wrapper) used to indicate that a box is factory sealed.

The production run of tins (containing the "Lost Marvel" cards) is 35,000 according to the gold-colored sticker found on the bottom of the tin, within the factory cellophane seal.

=== Battle Spectra Cards ===
- 1-D: Thing vs. Hulk
- 2-D: Silver Surfer vs. Thanos
- 3-D: Wolverine vs. Sabretooth
- 4-D: Spider-Man vs. Venom
- 5-D: Captain America vs. Red Skull

=== "Lost Marvel" Cards ===
- LM-1: Scarlet Witch
- LM-2: Feral
- LM-3: Deathbird
- LM-4: Typhoid Mary
- LM-5: Jubilee

=== Promo Cards ===
- Captain America
- Hulk
- Psylocke
- Silver Surfer
- Spider-Man
- Wolverine

=== Prototype Cards ===
- Hulk
- Spider-Man
- Wolverine

== Series 2 – 1993 ==
The set included 90 cards, along with 8 X-Men 2099 "Dyna-Etch" cards, randomly inserted throughout packs. The artwork from series 2 (featuring multiple well-known comic, fantasy and sci-fi artists) was also released by Marvel as three collections printed at standard comic size, titled "The Marvel Masterpieces 2 Collection (1–3)" allowing it to be seen in greater detail.

=== Dyna Etch cards ===
- S1: Meanstreak
- S2: Cerebra
- S3: Krystalin
- S4: Metalhead
- S5: Serpentina
- S6: Bloodhawk
- S7: Skullfire
- S8: Xi'an

=== Prototype Cards ===
She-Hulk, Daredevil, Venom (Black printing San Diego Comic-Con), and Hulk 2099.

== Series 3 – 1994 ==
This set was drawn entirely by Greg and Tim Hildebrandt. It contained two subsets: 10 Holofoils which came in silver, gold and bronze variations, depending on where they were purchased, and 9 PowerBlast cards. This set was also the first to introduce "parallel sets" to the series. All 140 base cards came with a parallel gold-foil "Signature" card which came one-to-a-pack. This concept was also used in other Marvel card sets. One exception: there are Jumbo and Walmart retail store boxes of the Hildebrandt 1994 set, and those have Gold and Bronze versions, respectively, of the usually silver Holofoil cards. Sealed boxes of those non-hobby or standard retail kind, or Jumbo and Walmart retail store ones with the gold and bronze foil versions, are quite valuable. The Jumbo retail and Walmart retail boxes have been known to sell for thousands of dollars on eBay, Amazon and other various websites.

=== Holofoil Cards ===
1. Captain America
2. Carnage
3. Daredevil
4. Hulk
5. Iron Man
6. Punisher
7. Scarlet Witch
8. Spider-Man
9. Venom
10. War Machine

=== PowerBlast Cards ===
- PB1: Apocalypse
- PB2: Archangel
- PB3: Cable
- PB4: Cyclops
- PB5: Gambit
- PB6: Magneto
- PB7: Rogue
- PB8: Sabretooth
- PB9: Wolverine

== Series 4 – 1995 ==
This set consisted of 150 standard cards, 22 "Canvas" cards, 8 "Holoflash" cards, and 2 "Mirage" cards. Artwork for the set was done by four artists: Dave Devries, Dimitrios Patelis, Peter Scanlan and Nelson. Each artist painted 38 different characters that the other artists also painted plus 9 unique characters that were only painted once. Continuing from the previous set, these cards came with parallel cards this time in the form of "E-Motion" signatures. The two mirage cards are rare, coming one to every 360 packs depending on the ratio. They are highly sought after. These boxes have increased highly in value and are very much sought by collectors as the 1996 Marvel masterpieces boxes. Since both years have limited print run the 1995 and 1996 are by far the rarest of the Marvel boxes to date. It was unknown at the time of production but now to a list count average found and credited. Less than 5,000 boxes have been manufactured.

=== Canvas Cards ===
1. Archangel
2. Beast
3. Bishop
4. Cable
5. Daredevil
6. Galactus
7. Gambit
8. Ghost Rider
9. Human Torch
10. Ice Man
11. Invisible Woman
12. Jubilee
13. Magneto
14. Namor
15. Professor X
16. Psylocke
17. Punisher
18. Rogue
19. Silver Surfer
20. Spider-Man
21. Thing
22. War Machine

=== Holoflash Cards ===
1. Apocalypse
2. Carnage
3. Dr. Doom
4. Mandarin
5. Mr. Sinister
6. Sabretooth
7. Thanos
8. Venom

=== Mirage Cards ===
1. Classic Avengers: Captain America, Hulk, Iron Man, and Thor
2. X-Men: Cyclops, Jean Grey, Storm, and Wolverine

== Series 5 – 1996 ==
This set included 100 standard cards, 6 "Gallery" cards, 6 "Double Impact" cards, and 9 artwork redemption cards. The artwork redemption cards were extremely rare and bore the text "Congratulations! You have just won an original piece of painted art from the Marvel Masterpieces 1996 set!" This series was drawn entirely by Boris Vallejo and Julie Bell.

=== Gallery Cards ===
1. Cyclops
2. Hulk
3. Magneto
4. Sabretooth
5. Spider-Man
6. Wolverine

=== Double Impact Cards ===
1. Bishop/Beast
2. Punisher/Psylocke
3. Rogue/Human Torch
4. Silver Surfer/Captain America
5. Storm/Spider-Man
6. Wolverine/Venom

=== Artwork Redemption Cards ===
1. Beast
2. Elektra
3. Gambit
4. Human Torch
5. Silver Surfer
6. Spider-Man
7. Storm
8. Venom
9. Wolverine

== Series 6 – Oct 2007 ==
A new series bearing the name "Marvel Masterpieces" was released by Upper Deck (UDE) in October 2007. Most (if not all) of the art used for the trading cards is taken from artwork which UDE already owns and has used in its Vs. System TCG.

This set consists of 90 base cards, 9 Spider-Man subset inserts, 9 X-Men subset inserts, 3-artist splash page subsets (triptychs) featuring Art by Alex Ross, Arthur Adams, and Drew Struzan.

Each base card in the set has two parallel versions: a "holo-foil" version, and a gold-foil border version. Each of the Spider-Man and X-Men subsets has a holo-foil subset version.

Additionally, there are randomly inserted "Artist Sketch Cards" each featuring an original sketch by a noted artist. These are all one-of-a-kind. It is not known exactly how many sketch cards were put into circulation, but there should be roughly the same number as the boxes, 13,000, since the odds on finding one is approximately 1:36 packs, or 1 per box.

Also, the art from the Alex Ross splash subset was made into ashcan box-toppers (black-and-white versions) and inserted randomly 1 per box, not in a pack. Plus, the artwork from the Art Adams splash subset was made into ashcan case-toppers, one included per factory case.

Each Hobby pack (packs bought from hobby/comic shops) contains a card with a code for 100 UDE points which can be redeemed at www.udepoints.com and then spent on various items in the ude points store.

== Series 7 – July 2008 ==
After the successful re-launch of the Marvel Masterpieces set in 2007, Upper Deck decided to release another set. The second set, Marvel Masterpieces 2 came out in July 2008. This set consisted of a 90-card base set, 9 Marvel Heroines Chase Set, 9 Avengers Chase Set, 5 Fantastic Four Movie Memorabilia Chase Set, and 3 Hulk Chase Cards and 3 Iron Man Chase Cards. Also available one per box was a hand-drawn sketch card drawn by an artist. There were more sketch cards with this set than the 2007 set because this saw a release of 18,000 boxes as opposed to 13,000 in 2007. Upper Deck plans on releasing Marvel Masterpieces 3 on December 9, 2008.

3 Hulk Chase Cards and 3 Iron Man Chase Cards
Sealed hobby boxes contain chase cards "Hulk A" and "Iron Man A" (1:18 packs)
Target packs contain chase cards "Hulk B" and "Iron Man B"
WalMart packs contain chase cards "Hulk C" and "Iron Man C"

== Series 8 – December 2008 ==
Series 8 has 90 base-set cards consisting of "Bring on the Bad Guys" and "Battles", and with the following Chase cards: 9 "Bronze" Marvel Knights cards, 9 "Silver" X-Men Secret Identities cards, 9 "Gold" Marvel Moments, 27 Writer Autograph cards, Artist Sketch cards, Promo card Spider-Man.

== Series 9 – 2016 ==
Marvel Masterpieces 2016 was released on June 29, 2016. Artwork for the entire set was done by Joe Jusko.

Article explaining Relaunch Marvel Masterpieces 2016

https://comicsalliance.com/upper-deck-marvel-masterpieces-2016-review/

== Series 10 – 2018 ==
https://www.cardboardconnection.com/2018-upper-deck-marvel-masterpieces-trading-cards

== 2020 ==
Upper Deck Entertainment released the 2020 Marvel Masterpieces set in September 2020, featuring original art by David Palumbo.
