= List of non-sports trading cards =

The following is a list of non-sports trading cards collections released among hundreds of card sets. The list includes different types that are or have been available, including animals, comics, television series, motor vehicles and movies, among others:

== Alternative (Alt) Trading Cards ==
- G.A.S. Series 1 (G.A.S. Trading Cards, 2021)
- G.A.S. Series 2 (G.A.S. Trading Cards, 2022)
- NFT IRL (G.A.S. Trading Cards, 2021-22)
- G.A.S. Moments (G.A.S. Trading Cards, 2021-22)
- Shock Drops (G.A.S. Trading Cards, 2022)
- Heavy Series 1 (Heavy Trading Cards, 2022)
- Heavy Series 2 (Heavy Trading Cards, 2022)
- Singularity (Heavy Trading Cards, 2022)
- Trash Panda Cards (Trash Panda Cards, 2022)
- Fill The Void Bootlegs (Fill The Void Bootlegs, 2022)
- Paper Chase Series 1 (Paper Chase Card Co., 2022)
- Paper Chase Series 2 (Paper Chase Card Co., 2022)
- All Base (All Base Trading Cards, 2022)
- Toast Trading Cards (Toast Trading Cards, 2022)
- Assassination Set (Hoosier Embalmer, 2022)

== Artist Trading Cards ==
- Collective: Multi Artist Series (House of Roulx: •R•T•C• Roulx Trading Cards, 2024)
- Dalek: "SKATE MONKEY" (House of Roulx: •R•T•C• Roulx Trading Cards, 2023)
- Scott Listfield: "FENWAY" (House of Roulx: •R•T•C• Roulx Trading Cards, 2023)
- Moon Patrol: Series One (House of Roulx: •R•T•C• Roulx Trading Cards, 2023)

== Cars and other vehicles ==
- Auto Rally (Edito-Service, 1978)
- Corvette Heritage Collection 1953–1996 (Collect-a-Card, 1996)
- Harley-Davidson (Collect-a-Card, 1992)
- Muscle Cars (Collect-a-Card, 1992)
- Orange County Choppers (JoyRide, 2004)

== Classical Literature Art ==
=== Arthur Conan Doyle ===
- Sherlock Holmes
- The Lost World

=== Herbert George Wells ===
- Island of Dr. Moreau (Monsterwax, 2005)
- The Time Machine (Monsterwax)
- War of the Worlds (Monsterwax)

=== Jules Verne ===
- Around the World in Eighty Days
- Journey to the Center of the Earth
- Twenty Thousand Leagues Under the Seas
- Voyages extraordinaires

== Comic books and fictional characters ==
- Avengers: Silver Age (Rittenhouse, 2015)
- Avengers Assemble! (Upper Deck)
- The Ackermonster's Cardiacards! (Raygen, 1991)
- Advanced Dungeons & Dragons (TSR)
- Amalgam Comics (Fleer)
- Avengelyne (Maximum Press/WildStorm, 1996)
- Batman: The Legend (Cryptozoic, 2013)
- Batman Archives (Rittenhouse, 2008)
- Chris Achilleos (FPG)
- Dark Dominion #0 Trading Card Set (Defiant Comics/The River Group, 1993, 150 cards)
- DC Comics (Impel, SkyBox, Topps, Upper Deck, Rittenhouse)
- DC Comics Epic Battles (Cryptozoic, 2014)
- DC Bombshells Series 1–3 (Cryptozoic, 2017–19)
- DC Cosmic Cards: Inaugural Edition (Impel, 1994)
- DC Cosmic Teams (SkyBox, 1993)
- DC's The New 52 (Cryptozoic, 2012)
- DC's The Women of Legend (Cryptozoic, 2013)
- Deadpool (Upper Deck, 2018)
- Disney Princess: Born to Explore (Panini, 2019)
- Donald Duck: 85 Years (Panini, 2019)
- Doomsday: The Death of Superman (SkyBox, 1992)
- Fantastic Four Archives (Rittenhouse, 2008)
- Joe Jusko's Edgar Rice Burroughs Collection (Note: Featuring art by Joe Jusko.) (FPG, 1994)
- Justice League (Cryptozoic, 2016)
- Justice League of America Archives (Rittenhouse, 2009)
- Kingdom Come Xtra (SkyBox, 1996)
- Marvel Annual 2018–19 (Upper Deck)
- Marvel Comics 70th Anniversary (Rittenhouse, 2010)
- Marvel Masterpieces (SkyBox, 1992)
- Marvel Motion (Note: Set of lenticular cards.) (SkyBox, 1996)
- Flair Marvel (Note: Set of 150 cards featuring art by Bill Sienkiewicz and others.) (Upper Deck, 2019)
- Marvel Premier (Upper Deck, 2019)
- Marvel Studios: The First 10 Years (Topps)
- Marvel Universe Series 1–3 (Impel, 1990–92)
- Mickey Mouse: 90 Years (Panini)
- Plasm Zero Issue (The River Group, 1993)
- The Punisher Season 1 (Upper Deck, 2020)
- Red Sonja (Breygent Marketing, 2011)
- The Sandman (SkyBox, 1994)
- The Savage Sword of Conan (Comic Images, 1988)
- Spider-Man
- Spider-Man: McFarlane Series I–II (Comic Images, 1989–90)
- Spider-Man Team-Up (Comic Images, 1990)
- Spider-Man McFarlane Era (Comic Images, 1992)
- Spider-Man II 30th Anniversary (Comic Images, 1992)
- The Amazing Spider-Man (Impel, 1992); (Rittenhouse, 2012)
- The Amazing Spider-Man (Fleer, 1994)
- Ultra Spider-Man (Fleer, 1995, 1997)
- Spider-Man Premium: Eternal Evil (Fleer/SkyBox, 1996)
- Spider-Man FilmCardz (ArtBox, 2002)
- Spider-Man (Topps, 2002)
- Spider-Man Archives (Rittenhouse, 2009)
- Superman: The Legend (Cryptozoic, 2013)
- Tarzan 100th Anniversary (Cryptozoic, 2012)
- Tintin (Lombard/PIB, 1970's) Original art illustrated by Hergé.
- The Uncanny X-Men (Impel, 1992) (Note: Original art illustrated by Jim Lee. In 2017, Marvel used many of those cards as variant covers.)
- Valiant Unity Trading Cards (Comic Images, 1992, 90 cards)
- The Valiant Era (Upper Deck, 1993, 120 cards)
- The Valiant Era II (Upper Deck, 1994)
- The Walking Dead Comic Book (Cryptozoic, 2013)
- The Women of Legend (Cryptozoic, 2013)
- Warriors of Plasm #0 Trading Card Set (Defiant Comics/The River Group, 1993, 150 cards)
- X-Men (SkyBox, 1993)
- X-Men Ultra (Fleer, 1994)

== Historic events ==
- Actors and Actresses (Allen & Ginter, c. 1890)
- AIDS Awareness (Eclipse, 1993)
- Aircraft (Godfrey Phillips, 1934)
- Airplane Spotter Playing Cards – World War II (U.S. Games Systems, Inc., 1990)
- Americana (Donruss, 2008)
- American Heritage (Topps, 2008–09)
- American Heritage: Heroes Edition (Topps, 2009)
- Americana Beyond the Moon: NASA's Continuing Mission (Donruss, 2008)
- American Pie (Topps, 2011)
- American Pride (Inkworks, 2001)
- Art of H. G. Wells: The Time Machine, Island of Dr. Moreau, War of the Worlds (Monsterwax, 2005)
- Art Treasures of the Vatican Library (Keepsake Collectibles, 1997)
- President Obama (Topps, 2008)
- Civil War News (Note: Artwork by Norm Saunders.) (Topps, 1962)
- Desert Storm (Note: About the "Operation Desert Storm" in the Gulf War.) (Pro Set, 1991)
- Don't Let It Happen Here (Note: Horror series illustrated by artist Ricardo Garijo.) (Monsterwax, 2003)
- Famous Minors (Godfrey Phillips, 1936)
- Film Favorites (Note: Illustration of famous actresses of that time.) (Godfrey Phillips, 1934)
- U.S. Presidents (J2, 2020)
- Johnson vs. Goldwater (Note: About the 1964 United States presidential election) (Topps, 1964)
- Military Propaganda & Posters Series 1 (Cult-Stuff, 2012)
- Man on the Moon (Topps, 1969)
- NASA Space Missions (J2, 2020)
- Princess Diana: Queen of Hearts (Trading Cards International, 1997)
- Railway Engines (Godfrey Phillips, 1934)
- Romance of the Heavens (W.D. & H.O. Wills, 1927)
- Second Sino-Japanese War (Gum, 1938)
- Green Beret (Philadelphia, 1966)
- Supersisters (Note: Featured famous women from politics, media and entertainment, culture, sports, and other areas of achievement.) (Supersisters, Inc., 1972)
- Titanic Commemorative Card Set (Cult-Stuff, 2012)
- Types of British Soldiers (Godfrey Phillips, 1900)
- Warplanes Collectors Club (Edito-Service, 1989)
- World War II (Philadelphia Gum, 1965)

== Humor ==
- Atomic Laugh Bombs (Exhibit Supply Co., 1948)
- Crazy Cards (Topps, 1961)
- Famous Monsters (Rosan Printing Co., 1963)
- Frankenstein Stickers (Topps, 1966)
- Funny Monsters (Topps, 1959)
- Garbage Pail Kids (Topps, 1985)
- GrossOut (Upper Deck/Kryptyx, 2006)
- Hollywood Zombies (Topps, 2007)
- Horror Monster (Nu-Cards Inc., 1961)
- Mad Magazine Series 1 (Lime Rock, 1992)
- Meanie Babies (Comic Images, 1998)
- Mad (Fleer, 1983)
- Make Your Own Name (Topps, 1966)
- National Lampoon (21st Century Archives, 1993)
- Nasty Tricks (Confex/Fun Stuff, 1990)
- Nutty Initials (Topps, 1967)
- Odd Rods (Donruss, 1969)
- Silly Supermarket Stickers (Top Shelf Enterprises, 2003)
- Spoofy Tunes (Butthedz, 1993)
- Stupid Smiles (Topps, 1983)
- Terror Tales (1967)
- Toxic High (Topps, 1992)
- Ugly Stickers (Topps, 1965)
- Wacky Packages (Topps, 1967–present)
- Weird Wheels (Topps, 1980)
- You'll Die Laughing (Bubbles/Topps, 1959)

== Merchandising and toys ==
- Anheuser-Busch (Ertl, 1996)
- Barbie, 36 Years of (Tempo Marketing, 1996)
- Barbie (Futera, 2000)
- Beanie Babies (Ty/Cyrk, 1998)
- California Raisins World Tour (Zoot, 1988)
- Campbell Soup Collection (Collect-a-Card, 1995)
- Coca-Cola Collection (Note: Featuring illustrated advertisement art.) (Collect-a-Card, 1994)
- Coors (Coors Brewing, 1995)
- Craftsman Tools 1992 (Sears, Roebuck & Co., 1992)
- Classic Toys (That's Entertainment, 1993)
- G.I. Joe Action Cards (Hasbro/Milton Bradley, 1986)
- Hot Wheels Collector Cards (Comic Images, 1999)
- LOL Surprise (Panini, 2018)
- McDonald's Collectible Cards (Classic/McDonald's, 1996)
- Norfin Trolls (Collect-a-Card, 1993)
- Pepsi-Cola Premium Cards (Dart FlipCards, 1996)
- Santa Claus: A Nostalgic Art Collection (21st Century Archives, 1994)
- Suckadelic Suckpax (Sucklord, 2011)
- Theme Park Treasures Rollercoasters Collectible Cards (ThePhoenixFactory, 2024)

== Films ==
- Ace Ventura: When Nature Calls (Donruss, 1995)
- Asterix: The Secret of the Magic Potion (Panini, 2019)
- The Addams Family (Topps, 1991)
- Akira (Cornerstone, 1994)
- Disney's Aladdin (SkyBox, 1993)
- Alien (Topps, 1979)
- Alien Nation (FTCC, 1990)
- Alien vs. Predator (Inkworks, 2007)
- Avengers: Age of Ultron (Upper Deck, 2015)
- Avengers: Infinity War (Upper Deck, 2018)
- Avengers: Endgame (Panini, 2019)
- Back to the Future Part II (Topps, 1989)
- Batman (1989) (Topps, 1989)
- Batman Returns (O-Pee-Chee, 1992)
- Batman & Robin (Fleer, 1997)
- Batman Begins (Topps, 2005)
- Beauty and the Beast (Panini)
- The Black Hole (Topps, 1979)
- Cars 3 (Panini)
- Casper (Fleer, 1995)
- The Cat in the Hat (Comic Images, 2003)
- Chicken Run (Futera, 2000)
- Chucky (Fright-Rags, 2018)
- Close Encounters of the Third Kind (Topps, 1978)
- Coco (Panini)
- Congo (Upper Deck, 1995)
- Dinosaurs Attack! (Topps, 1988)
- Dragonheart (Topps, 1996)
- Dragons (Panini, 2017)
- Ender's Game (Cryptozoic, 2014)
- E.T. the Extra-Terrestrial (O-Pee-Chee, 1982)
- Fievel Goes West (Impel, 1991)
- Frozen (Topps, 2013)
- Ghostbusters II (Topps, 1989)
- Ghostbusters (2016) (Cryptozoic, 2016)
- Grease (Topps, 1978)
- Gremlins (Topps, 1984)
- Harry Potter (Artbox, 2005–06)
- High School Musical (Topps, 2006)
- High School Musical 2 (Topps, 2007)
- High School Musical 3 (Topps, 2008)
- The Hobbit: An Unexpected Journey (Cryptozoic, 2014)
- The Hobbit: The Desolation of Smaug (Cryptozoic, 2015)
- The Hobbit: The Battle of the Five Armies (Cryptozoic, 2016)
- Hook (Topps, 1992)
- Indiana Jones and the Temple of Doom (Topps, 1984)
- James Bond: Goldfinger (Philadelphia Gum, 1965)
- James Bond: Thunderball (Philadelphia Gum, 1966)
- James Bond: Moonraker (Topps, 1979)
- Jaws 2 (Topps, 1979)
- Jaws 3-D (Topps, 1983)
- Jurassic World: Fallen Kingdom (Panini)
- Justice League (Panini, 2017)
- The Karate Kid (Topps, 1984)
- The Lion King (SkyBox, 1994), (Panini, 201?)
- The Little Mermaid (Pro Set, 1989)
- Madagascar 3 (Panini, 2008)
- Mars Attacks (Topps, 1962) (artwork by Norm Saunders)
- Monsters, Inc. (Topps, 2001)
- Night of the Living Dead (Rosem, 1987); (Imagine Inc, 1988, 1990, 1993); (Image Ten, 2009, 2012, 2013); (Unstoppable, 2012); (Fantasm Media, 2018); (Fright-Rags, 2020)
- Pacific Rim (Cryptozoic, 2014)
- Planet of the Apes (Topps, 1969); (Inkworks, 1999)
- Raiders of the Lost Ark (Topps, 1981)
- Rambo: First Blood Part II (Topps, 1985)
- RoboCop 2 (Topps, 1990)
- The Rocketeer (Topps, 1992)
- Rocky II (Topps, 1979)
- Rocky IV (Topps, 1985)
- Screen Goddesses (Futera, 1999) (Note: Set of 14 cards featuring famous actresses.)
- Small Soldiers (Inkworks, 1998)
- Space Jam (Upper Deck, 1996–97)
- Spider-Man 2 (Upper Deck, 2004)
- Spider-Man 3 (Rittenhouse, 2007)
- Spider-Man: Far From Home (Panini, 2019)
- Supergirl (Topps, 1984)
- Superman (1978) (Topps, 1978)
- Superman III (Topps, 1983)
- Superman Returns (Topps, 2006)
- Star Trek (Topps, 1973); (FTCC, 1984–87); (Skybox, 1994); (Rittenhouse, –2017)
- Star Wars (O-Pee-Chee, 1977) (Topps, 1977–2017)
- The Empire Strikes Back (O-Pee-Chee, 1980)
- Return of the Jedi (O-Pee-Chee, 1983)
- Terminator 2: Judgment Day (Topps, 1991) (Impel, 1991)
- Toy Story (SkyBox, 1995)
- Toy Story 4 (Panini, 2019)
- Turma da Mônica: Laços (Panini, 2019)
- WiFi Ralph (Panini)
- Who Framed Roger Rabbit (Topps, 1988)

== Music artists ==
- Bay City Rollers (Topps/Trebor, 1975)
- Beatles: Black & White 1st Series (Topps, 1964)
- Christina Aguilera (Upper Deck, 2000)
- Justin Bieber (Panini, 2010)
- Duran Duran (Topps, 1985)
- Elvis Presley (Bubble Gums, 1956); (Donruss, 1978); (Monty Gum, 1978); (Chu Bops, 1981); (River Cards, 1992); (Press Pass, 2006, 2007)
- Freddie and the Dreamers (Donruss, 1965)
- KISS (Donruss, 1978); (Dynamite, 2018)
- Michael Jackson: The King of Pop (Leaf, 2011) (Note: Several other sets of Jackson were made over the years by other companies, including Topps and OCP)
- Northwest Rock Trading Cards (Vince Gipson Photography, 1993)
- Ozzy Osbourne (Monowise Limited/Neca, 2001)
- Rock Stars (Donruss, 1979); (Wonder Bread, 1985)
- Rolling Stones (Whosontour Entertainment, 2007)
- Superstars MusicCards [U.K. edition] (Pro Set, 1991–92)
- Spice Girls: World Official Photo Cards (Magic Box Int., 1997)
- Yo! MTV Raps (Pro Set, 1991)
- Classic Rock, series 1–9 (J2, 2018)
- New Wave Series (J2, 2019)
- Classic R&B and Soul Series (J2, 2020)

== Nature and animals ==
- Animals (Premiere/Oak, 1960)
- Animals (Godfrey Phillips, 1930)
- Animals of the World (Topps, 1951)
- Animals on Safari (Boomerang Book Club, 1993)
- Animaux à sauver French version of "Wildlife in Danger" (Panini, 1992)
- Awesome Animals (Club Pro Set, 1993)
- Birds (Oak Manufacturing, 1958)
- Birds of America (Allen & Ginter, c. 1890)
- Birds of the Tropics (Allen & Ginter, c. 1890)
- Birds & Flowers of the States (Bon Air, 1991)
- Challenge of the Yukon: Dog Cards (Quaker Oats, 1950)
- Discovery Cards: Insects & Spiders V.1 (Curious Discoveries, Inc., 1996)
- Discovery Cards: Reptiles & Amphibians V.1 (Curious Discoveries, Inc., 1996)
- Discovery Cards: Sea Life V.1 (Curious Discoveries, Inc., 1996)
- Discovery Cards: Zoo Animals V.1 (Curious Discoveries, Inc., 1996)
- Dogs (Allen & Ginter, c. 1890)
- Dogs (Godfrey Phillips, 1935)
- National Parks Collection (Jefferson National Expansion Historical Assoc., 1995)
- Wild Animals of the World (Allen & Ginter, c. 1890)

== TV series ==
- A-Team (Topps, 1983)
- Aaahh!! Real Monsters (Fleer, 1995)
- Abbott and Costello (DuoCards, 1996)
- Adventure Time (Cryptozoic, 2010's)
- Addams Family (Donruss, 1964)
- ALF (Topps, 1987)
- Alphas (Cryptozoic, 2013)
- Alias (Inkworks, 2002)
- American Bandstand (Collect-a-Card, 1993)
- American Chopper (JoyRide, 2004)
- American Idol (Fleer, 2004); (Upper Deck, 2009)
- Animaux (Panini, 2019)
- Andy Griffith Show (Pacific, 1991)
- Angel (Inkworks, 1999)
- Archer Seasons 1-4 (Cryptozoic 2014)
- Arrow (Cryptozoic, 2015)
- Babylon 5 (Rittenhouse, 1995/1996) (Skybox, 1999)
- Batman (Topps, 1966) (Note: Topps produced five different sets, with three of them being illustrated by Norman Saunders and the other two with photographs from the Batman movie released that same year.)
- Battlestar Galactica (1978) (Topps, 1978); (Dart, 1996)
- Battlestar Galactica (2004) (Rittenhouse, 2006)
- Baywatch (Sports Time, 1995)
- Beverly Hillbillies (Topps, 1963); (Eclipse, 1993)
- Big Bang Theory Seasons 1-7 (Cryptozoic, 2012–16)
- Bill Nye the Science Guy (SkyBox, 1995)
- Bionic Woman (Donruss, 1976)
- Brady Bunch (Topps, 1971)
- Branson on Stage (Note: Country music TV show.) (NAC, 1992)
- Breaking Bad Seasons 1-5 (Cryptozoic, 2014)
- Buck Rogers (1979) (Topps, 1979)
- Buffy The Vampire Slayer (Inkworks, 1999)
- Captain Scarlet (2005) (Cards Inc., 2001–02)
- Castle Seasons 1-4 (Cryptozoic, 2013–14)
- Charlie's Angels (Topps, 1977); (O-Pee-Chee, 1977)
- CHiPs (Donruss, 1979)
- Daktari (Philadelphia Gum, 1966–67)
- Dallas (Donruss, 1981)
- Dinosaurs (Pro Set, 1992)
- Dragon Ball (Panini, 2018)
- The Dukes of Hazzard (Donruss, 1980)
- Doctor Who (Topps, 2015)
- Downton Abbey Seasons 1-2 (Cryptozoic, 2014)
- Elena of Avalor (Panini)
- The Flash (Cryptozoic, 2016)
- Flintstones (Dynamic Toy, 1962)
- Flintstones NFL (Cardz, 1993) (Note: Featuring the Flintstones in American football plays.)
- Return of the Flintstones (Cardz, 1994)
- Fringe, Seasons 1-5 (Cryptozoic, 2012–16)
- Gilligan's Island (Topps, 1965)
- Gravity Falls (Panini)
- As Aventuras de Poliana (Panini)
- Gotham Seasons 1-2 (Cryptozoic, 2016–17)
- Green Hornet (Donruss, 1966)
- Guild Seasons 1-3 (Cryptozoic, 2011)
- Happy Days (O-Pee-Chee, 1976)
- Hogan's Heroes (Fleer, 1965)
- Incredible Hulk (Topps, 1979)
- Kojak (Monty Gum, 1975)
- Legends of Tomorrow Series 1–2 (Cryptozoic, 2018)
- Lost in Space (Topps, 1965)
- Magnum, P.I. (Donruss, 1982)
- Man from U.N.C.L.E. (Topps, 1965)
- M*A*S*H* (Donruss, 1982)
- Mighty Morphin Power Rangers (Collect-a-Card, 1994)
- Miraculous (Panini)
- Misfits (Pop Culture Company, 2012)
- Mod Squad (Topps, 1966)
- Monkees (1966)
- Mork & Mindy (Topps, 1978)
- Once Upon a Time (Cryptozoic, 2014)
- Orphan Black Seasons 1-3 (Cryptozoic, 2016–17)
- Outer Limits (Topps, 1964)
- Outlander Seasons 1-2 (Cryptozoic, 2019)
- Partridge Family (Topps, 1971)
- PAW Patrol (Panini, 2018)
- Penny Dreadful (Cryptozoic, 2015)
- Pink Panther (Monty Gum)
- Psych Seasons 1-8 (2013–15)
- Red Dwarf (Futera, 2002)
- Revenge (Cryptozoic, 2013)
- Rick and Morty Season 1–3 (Cryptozoic, 2018)
- Simpsons (Topps, 1990)
- Sleepy Hollow (Cryptozoic, 2015)
- Smallville (Inkworks, 2002); (Cryptozoic, 2012)
- Sons of Anarchy Seasons 1-7 (Cryptozoic, 2014–15)
- Soy Luna (Panini)
- Star Trek Original (1966) (Leaf, 1967); (Topps, 1976); (Impel, 1992) (Note: 25th Anniversary edition.); (SkyBox, 1999); (Rittenhouse, 2009)
- Star Trek Next Generation (1987) (Impel, 1992); (SkyBox, 1995); (Rittenhouse, 2010)
- Star Trek Deep Space Nine (1993) (SkyBox, 1993)
- Star Trek Voyager (1995) (SkyBox, 1998); (Rittenhouse, 2015)
- Star Trek Enterprise (2001) (Rittenhouse, 2002)
- Star Wars: The Clone Wars (Topps)
- Superman (Topps, 1965)
- Stargate SG-1 (Rittenhouse, 2001)
- Stargate Atlantis (Rittenhouse, 2005)
- Stargate Universe (Rittenhouse, 2009)
- Stranger Things (Topps, 2018)
- Supergirl (Cryptozoic, 2018)
- Superman (Topps, 1966)
- Supernatural (Inkworks, 2007); (Cryptozoic, 2014–16)
- Teenage Mutant Ninja Turtles (1987) (Topps, 1989)
- Teenage Mutant Ninja Turtles (2003) (Fleer, 2003)
- Three Stooges (Fleer, 1959); (Fleer, 1966); DuoCards (1997)
- Three's Company (Topps, 1978)
- ThunderCats (Bandai, 2012)
- Vampirina (Panini)
- Vampire Diaries Seasons 1–4 (Cryptozoic, 2012–16)
- Violetta (Panini)
- The Walking Dead Seasons 1–4 (2011–16)
- Welcome Back, Kotter (Topps, 1976)
- Winx Club (Panini, 2004)
- X-Files (Topps, 1995) (Note: Seasons 1–3.); (Inkworks, 2001) (Note: Seasons 4–9.); (Rittenhouse, 2018) (Note: Seasons 10–11.)
- X-Files Connections (Inkworks, 2005);
- Xena: Warrior Princess (Topps, 1998); (Rittenhouse, 2004)

== Video games ==
- Fortnite, Series 1 (Panini, 2019)
- Clash Royale (Topps, 2018)

== See also ==
- Collectible card game
- Digital collectible card game
- List of digital collectible card games
- List of most expensive CCG cards
- Non-sports trading card
