= Hockey card =

Type of trading card

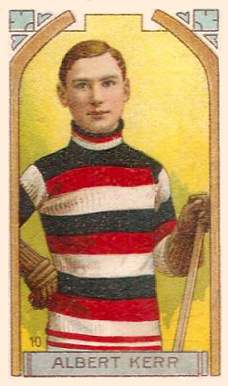
- Albert Kerr of the Ottawa Senators in an Imperial Tobacco Canada card c. 1910–11
- Other names: Ice hockey card
- Type: Trading card
- Company: Topps; Upper Deck; Leaf
- Country: Canada
- Availability: 1910–present
- Features: Ice hockey

A hockey card is a type of trading card typically printed on some sort of card stock, featuring one or more ice hockey players or other hockey-related theme and are typically found in countries such as Canada, the United States, Finland and Sweden where hockey is a popular sport and there are professional leagues. The obverse normally features an image of the subject with identifying information such as name and team. The reverse can feature statistics, biographical information, or as many early cards did, advertising. There is no fixed size or shape of hockey cards, running the gamut from rectangular to circular, however modern North American cards have typically standardized on a 2.5-by-3.5-inch (6.4 cm × 8.9 cm) rectangular format.

== History ==
The first hockey cards were included in cigarette packages from 1910 to 1913, manufactured by Imperial Tobacco Canada for the inaugural NHA season. The 1910 set had a total of 36 cards, each one featuring an illustration of a player. After World War I, only one more cigarette set was issued, during the 1924–25 season by Champ's Cigarettes. NHL player Billy Coutu's biography includes an example of one of the 40 cards issued at that time.

During the 1920s, some hockey cards were printed by food and candy companies, such as Paulin's Candy, Maple Crispette, Crescent, Holland Creameries and La Patrie.

Through to 1941, O-Pee-Chee printed hockey cards, stopping production for World War II. Presumably, the 1941 involvement of the U.S. in the war affected the hockey card market, since Canada had been in the war since 1939.

Hockey cards next appeared during 1951–52, issued by Toronto's Parkhurst Products. Brooklyn's Topps Chewing Gum began printing hockey cards in 1954–1955. Parkhurst and Topps did not produce cards for the 1955–56 season but returned for 1957–58.

In the 1960s, some hockey card and hockey coin sets were issued by food companies, including Shirriff Desserts, Salada Tea and York Peanut Butter.

Other companies to manufacture hockey cards include Pinnacle, Pacific, Pro Set, Upper Deck, In The Game, Panini, Score, and various early 1990s manufacturers (7th Inning Sketch, Classic, etc.). Oil brand Esso briefly issued stamp-sized hockey cards on soft paper in the early 1970s in return for gas purchases.

=== Post lockout hockey cards (2005-present) ===
After the National Hockey League lockout that cancelled the 2004-05 NHL season, the hockey card market changed dramatically. Prior to the lockout, Upper Deck, Pacific, Topps and In The Game Trading Cards were all licensed by the NHL and NHLPA to produce trading cards featuring NHL players and logos. After the lockout, Upper Deck emerged with an exclusive contract from both parties. Upper Deck paid $25 million over 5 years for this deal with the NHLPA.

Without licensing, Topps did not produce hockey cards. Pacific went out of business, having produced its last set just before the NHL lockout. In The Game continued to produce hockey cards without NHL and NHLPA licensing. They signed current and retired NHL players to individual contracts, allowing the use of their likenesses and autographs. In The Game also signed licensing deals with the CHL, the AHL and Hockey Canada to use players and logos from these organizations in their products. Prior to the 2010–11 NHL season, Upper Deck renewed its license and the NHL and prior NHLPA awarded Panini with a license. Following the 2013–14 NHL season, Upper Deck gained exclusive rights, and Panini lost its license.

As of 2022, Upper Deck are commercializing NHL and NHLPA trading cards after the company signed an extension of the agreement license, which it holds since the 2014–15 season.
