= Parkhurst Products =

Canadian company

- Type: Private
- Industry: Confectionery, collectable
- Founded: 1951
- Defunct: 1964; 62 years ago
- Fate: Company defunct; Parkhurst brand licensed to Pro Set in 1991, other owners (the last, Upper Deck) since then
- Headquarters: Toronto, Canada
- Products: Bubble gum, trading cards
- Brands: Parkie, Zip
- Owner: (Brand name): Pro Set (1991–93); Upper Deck (1993–2000); In The Game (2000–04); Upper Deck (2005–present)

Parkhurst Products is a former Canadian confectionery manufacturing company based in Toronto and currently, a trading card brand. Parkhurst also produced Parkies and Zip trading cards in the 1950s and 1960s. Led by George Kennedy, it primarily produced hand-size picture cards mainly for ice hockey, but also for baseball, Canadian football, wrestling and other subjects.

Nowadays, the Parkhurst brand is property of Upper Deck, which acquired the rights to the name in 2005. Upper Deck has been releasing ice hockey cards with the brand Parkhurst since then, having started in June 2006.

== History ==
=== Parkies and Zip cards ===
Over a 13-year period from 1951–52 to 1963–64, Parkhurst Products made 12 popular hockey card sets, primarily targeted towards kids. A typical pack of Parkies or Zip hockey cards cost five cents and included a stick of gum and several cards (usually four or five).

Bubble gum cards were popular in Canada and the United States in the 1930s, but were all but forgotten in the 1940s because of wartime rations. Thanks to the 10-year gap between the 1940-41 O-Pee-Chee series and the 1951-52 Parkies series, the new 1951-52 Parkies series featured the first popular cards for many of the game's heroes. The two biggest rookies (or rookie cards, as they are known today) were legends Maurice Richard and Gordie Howe, both of whom actually made their debuts in the 1940s.

For its first four seasons, the Parkies hockey series featured players from all six National Hockey League teams. The 1951–52 series was small (44.5 mm x 63.5 mm) and the 1952–53 series only slightly bigger (49.2 mm x 74.6 mm). Starting in 1953–54, the Parkies series was a comfortable size of 63.5 mm x 92.1 mm, and was originally marketed as "Giant" in comparison to the previous seasons.

Parkhurst Products also published a small-size series of minor-league baseball cards in 1952, a small-size series of Canadian football cards in 1952, and two hand-size series of wrestling cards in 1954-55 and 1955–56. It produced a small-size Photo-Magic series of Canadian football cards in 1956.

In 1955–56, the Parkies hockey series featured only the two Canadian teams the Montreal Canadiens and Toronto Maple Leafs. The 1955–56 series included both modern players are retired Oldtime Greats from both teams. In 1956–57, no 'proper' Parkies hockey series was produced, although Photo Magic cards have surfaced in recent years.

Starting in 1957–58, Parkies competed with O-Pee-Chee hockey cards produced in conjunction with Topps Chewing Gum. The Parkies hockey series still featured just the two Canadian teams, while the O-Pee-Chee/Topps series featured the NHL's four American teams. Parkies adopted a new, slightly trimmer card size of 61.9 mm x 92.1 mm, while O-Pee-Chee used the newly established Topps standard size of 63.5 mm x 88.9 mm (2.5" x 3.5").

Starting in 1960–61, Parkies added the Detroit Red Wings to its hockey series, most notably adding reigning MVP Gordie Howe for the first time in six years. The O-Pee-Chee/Topps series was now left with just three American teams (although for two years it included cards and stamps of retired All-Time Greats).

In 1963–64, Parkhurst Products made its last hockey series. Kennedy reportedly loved making hockey cards for kids, but his successes in other enterprises required him to drop his bubble gum and picture card businesses. After Parkies left the hockey card market, the 1964-65 O-Pee-Chee/Topps series featured players from all six NHL teams.

=== Modern cards ===
The Parkhurst brand was resuscitated in 1991 by a group led by Dr. Brian H. Price. As a last resort to bring the historic brand back, he licensed Parkhurst to Pro Set, Inc., a Dallas-based hockey card manufacturer. After the hockey card explosion of 1990–91, Parkhurst cards were back in the marketplace. Now promoted as a premium brand of cards, there were three different series available. Series I and Series II were available in English and French and featured the rookie cards of players such as Dominik Hasek and John LeClair. The 1991–92 Update Set was the final release of the year and was the most valuable of all three sets. One of the key rookie cards of that set was of Bill Guerin. Of note, the cases of Parkhurst cards were sequentially numbered, and this was the first time hockey card cases were numbered.

When Pro Set, Inc. entered Chapter Eleven bankruptcy protection prior to the 1992–93 "season", Price was forced to travel weekly from Toronto to Dallas and became the unofficial hockey brand manager in order to keep the brand alive. The second year of Parkhurst (1992–93) was the last with Pro Set as the company went bankrupt and Price took his Parkhurst brand name to the Upper Deck Company, a five-year agreement which began with the 1993–94 season.

As part of the Upper Deck/Parkurst licence agreement during the 1993–94 hockey season, Price was allowed under the Upper Deck/NHL licence to create and release three retrospective Parkhurst trading cards sets. The first set of cards was known unofficially as "The Missing Link" (a mock 1956-57 set). These cards were produced to complement the fact that Parkhurst did not make cards in 1956. All the cards in the set featured the Original Six teams. The cards featured stats from the 1955–56 season, and had a very retro feel to them, with a no-gloss finish and simple design. One of the most unusual cards in the set was a card featuring the likeness of Johnny Bower in a New York Rangers uniform, while other Parkhurst traditions were upheld, such as action cards.

The popularity of this set led to two other retro-style sets, one commemorating the 1964–65 season (in the "Tall Boy" format Topps used that year), released in 1995, and a subsequent set issued in 1996. This set "commemorated" the 1966–67 season, which signified the rookie season of Bobby Orr and the final Stanley Cup triumph of the Montreal Canadiens. Once again, all Original Six teams were featured in the set and each pack contained a "wheel", akin to the Shirriff pieces issued around this time. There was one wheel issued per pack, which paralleled the shell cards (player cards) in the set, as well as 10 bonus wheels that paralleled the Beehive-inspired inserts of Orr and Gordie Howe.

Aside from the Missing Link sets, three other series were issued by Price and Upper Deck (two series in 1993–94 and one in 1994–95) in North America. One other set released in 1994–95 was the Parkhurst SE series (Special Edition), intended for distribution in Europe but equally available in North America. It could be distinguished from the standard 1994-95 Parkhurst cards by its unique numbering with an SE prefix. This set also featured the first cards of players like Jarome Iginla and Jean-Sébastien Giguère.

After two years, Upper Deck breached its Parkhurst licence agreement in 1995, thus the brand was no longer in Upper Deck's hands. With no place else to turn, Price created his own release, Parkhurst International, only available in the European markets. Some of the highlights from the 1995–96 Parkhurst set can be found in Series II, including the first card of Wayne Gretzky in a St. Louis Blues uniform. Although the controversy of this card was that Wayne Gretzky's face was superimposed over previous captain Shayne Corson's body, it was not correct. Wayne Gretzky was also featured on another card in the Series II set, but this time, it was on the back. Kevin Stevens was featured in Series II as a member of the Los Angeles Kings. On the back of the card is a picture of Kevin Stevens and Wayne Gretzky wearing the Los Angeles Kings' third jersey. This is the only known card that features an image of Wayne Gretzky in this infamous Kings "playing card" jersey. Despite these unique Gretzky issues, the brand disappeared after 1995–96, save for phone card and 24-karat gold specialty issues.

=== In The Game obtains Parkhurst licence ===
For the 50th anniversary of the initial set, the Parkhurst brand was relaunched by Dr Price's new venture In The Game. The set appeared as an insert in various 2000–01 products, then was re-introduced a year later as a standalone set. Parkhurst was issued in 2001–02 and 2002–03 before becoming a larger brand name in 2003–04, where it was broken up into multiple sets, including Parkhurst Rookie and Parkhurst Original Six, which was subdivided into six sets. Several collectors still debate the legitimacy of these cards being considered rookie cards, since they were team-specific. The only other set issued under the Parkhurst moniker was Parkhurst Retro (in the 2002–03 season), which used the 1951–52 design.

=== Upper Deck Company acquires Parkhurst licence ===
The new incarnation lasted only a few years before the 2004–05 NHL lockout threw the trading card market into chaos. During this year, the NHLPA did not work with In The Game. ITG, rather than use the Parkhurst name, used alternative titles such as In The Game Franchises under a licence from the NHL.

Prior to the lockout, Ted Saskin of the NHLPA made a back room deal with Upper Deck making them exclusive licensee for NHLPA hockey trading cards. When the NHL resumed operation, the NHL got wind of the NHLPA's arrangement and agreed to give Upper Deck an exclusive arrangement, too.

In 2005, Upper Deck acquired the licence to the Parkhurst brand name and issued a new Parkhurst series. This was a unique brand that was launched late in the 2005–06 season, featuring 700 cards and had a card of Alexander Ovechkin's goal, lying flat on his back (card number 588). Another unique card commemorated the first head-to-head meeting between Ovechkin and Sidney Crosby (card number 600). In all, there were four cards of Alexander Ovechkin (card numbers 588, 597, 600, and 700), while there were six cards of Sidney Crosby (card numbers 526, 586, 587, 593, 657, and 694). Not to be forgotten, this set also features Stanley Cup Hero Cam Ward of the Carolina Hurricanes (card number 614).

Parkhurst returned in the 2006–07 season, with a shift in focus to retired players. The set included a wide variety of autographs, from Hall of Fame honoured members such as Patrick Roy to cult favourites like Bobby Smith.

== Bibliography ==
- The Parkies Hockey Card Story by Richard Scott, October 2017 – Publisher: Blurb – ISBN 978-1-3667-2544-8
- Hockey Cards: A Charlton Standard Catalogue by W.K. Cross, Aug 2004 – Publisher:Charlton Press and Trajan Publishing – ISBN 978-0-8896-8289-4
- Vintage Hockey Collector price guide – 1910–1990, by Bobby Burrel, 2006
