= Roy Castleton =

American baseball player (1885–1967)

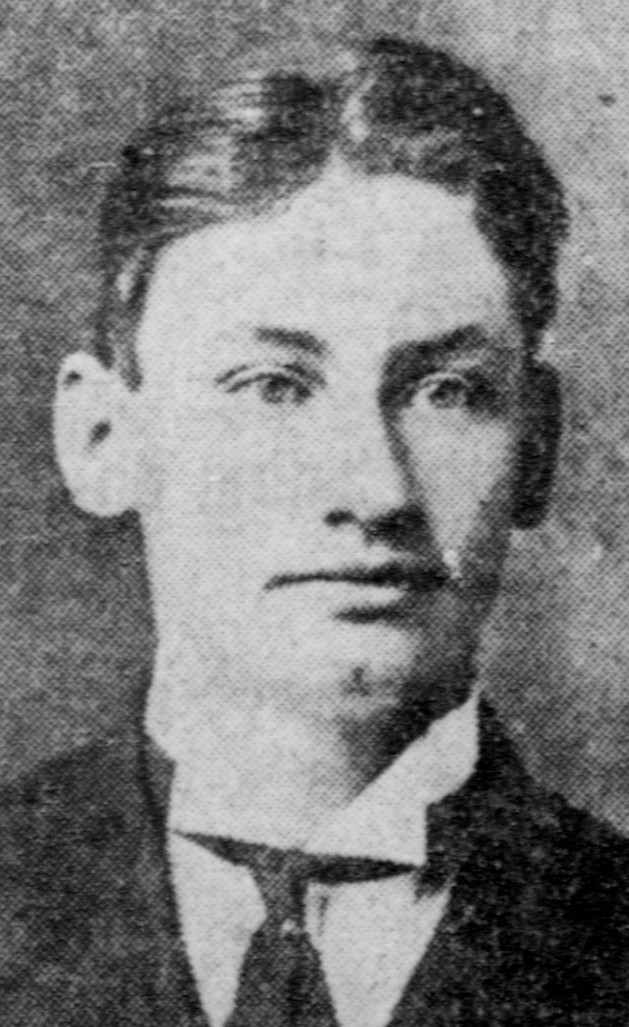
- Castleton, circa 1906
- Pitcher
- Born: July 26, 1885; Salt Lake City, Utah
- Died: June 24, 1967 (aged 81); Los Angeles
- Batted: Right Threw: Left

MLB debut
- April 16, 1907, for the New York Highlanders

Last MLB appearance
- May 29, 1910, for the Cincinnati Reds

MLB statistics
- Win–loss record: 3–4
- Strikeouts: 13
- Earned run average: 2.68
- Stats at Baseball Reference

Teams
- New York Highlanders (1907); Cincinnati Reds (1909–10)

Royal Eugene Castleton (July 26, 1885 – June 24, 1967) was a relief pitcher for the New York Highlanders and Cincinnati Reds. The first native of the state of Utah and the first Mormon to play in the major leagues, Castleton made his debut with the Highlanders on April 16, 1907, and played his final game with the Reds on May 29, 1910.

Castleton's potential as a player was undermined by chronic health problems that ultimately forced him to retire. He is most often remembered for pitching a perfect game while playing for a team in the Ohio–Pennsylvania League.

== Early years ==
Castleton was born in Salt Lake City, to parents who were born in England. After arriving in the United States, his grandfather, James Castleton, worked as a gardener for Brigham Young, eventually saving enough money to establish his own business. His father, Charles Castleton, was a successful carpenter, and young Roy enjoyed the amenities of a middle-class upbringing. A strong student who excelled at mathematics, Castleton gravitated toward a career in sports shortly after graduating from high school.

== Minor league career ==
In 1904, Castleton signed on with the Salt Lake City ball club, which played in the Class B Pacific National League. In the 1904–1905 season, he pitched for another team based in Ogden, Utah, that was also poised to enter the league. Still a teenager, he nevertheless distinguished himself with a 16-inning loss.

In 1906, Castleton moved east and joined the minor league Youngstown Ohio Works, a team based in the steel-production center of Youngstown, Ohio. The youngest player on a club of seasoned veterans, Castleton gained national exposure with a perfect game against rival Akron, shutting them out at 4–0. The local media compared the feat to Cy Young's perfect game a year earlier, and Castleton quickly received offers from major league managers, including Clark Griffith of the New York Highlanders. Drafted by the Highlanders, Castleton played out the remainder of the season in Youngstown, ending with a 22–12 record and striking out 156 batters in 278 innings.

== Major league career ==
After spring training in Atlanta, Castleton was one of five pitchers used in an opening game against the Philadelphia Athletics. After pitching a hitless inning, he was selected as starting pitcher for an exhibition game with Newark. Unfortunately, he performed poorly and was sent back to Atlanta for additional experience. Once there, Castleton pitched formidably in the Southern Association, winning 10 of 13 decisions for Atlanta, despite earlier inactivity due to a sore arm. At the close of the Southern Association's season, Castleton was called to rejoin the New York Highlanders, where he made two starts in the last week of the American League season. In his first start, during a contest with the St. Louis Browns, Castleton allowed five hits, striking out two, and walking one. Despite New York's 3–1 loss to the Browns, the pitcher gained positive reviews. During his second start, in a match with the Chicago White Sox, Castleton allowed six hits, striking out three and walking one.

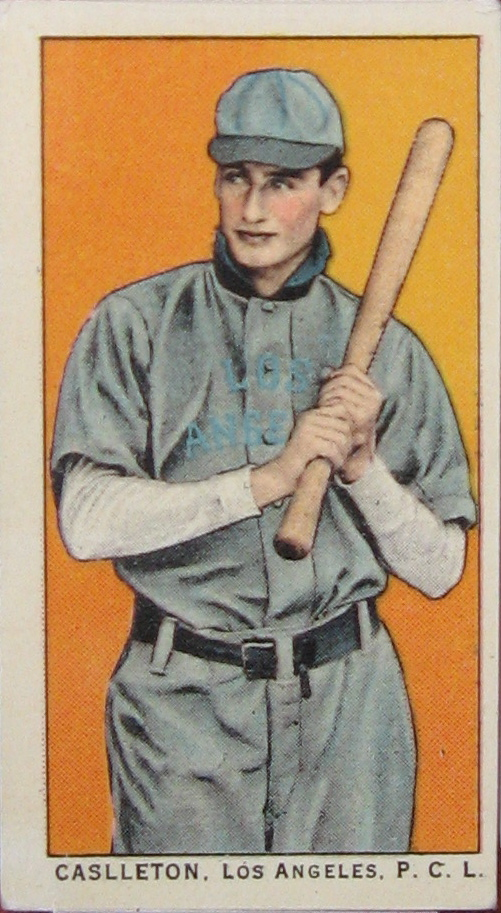
A baseball card of Castleton from 1910. The card was printed in error, as Castleton's name is misspelled.

Despite Castleton's solid pitching, manager Griffith chose to option Castleton to Atlanta for additional seasoning—a decision that had unexpectedly tragic implications for Castleton's career. After a strong start, Castleton suffered a bout with typhoid fever that left him in uncertain health from that point on. His poor health contributed to an inconsistent record, which resulted in his eventual release to Cincinnati in 1909. In the only game of a scheduled doubleheader with Boston (the other games had been cancelled due to inclement weather), Castleton finished with four strikeouts and only one walk. Unfortunately, this was followed by a disastrous appearance in a July 25 bout with St. Louis. Continual health problems that evidently resulted from his 1908 illness impeded his performance, and he was forced to endure long periods of inactivity.

== Later years ==
After playing his final game with Cincinnati on May 29, 1910, Castleton continued to pitch for two more seasons with minor league teams in the Pacific Coast League. Despite strong showings, Castleton opted to retire in 1912, as concerns about his damaged health mounted. While his later career was impeded by illness, Castleton was long remembered for his early performance in the Southern Association as well as his perfect game as a minor league pitcher.

After retiring from baseball, Castleton returned to Salt Lake City, where he married Ester Adella Kjeldsen and established a lucrative practice as an accountant. He eventually relocated with his wife to Los Angeles, where he died in 1967. His remains were returned to Salt Lake City for burial.
