= ITG =

ITG may refer to:

== Organizations ==
- Iraqi Transitional Government (2005–2006), former ruling institution of Iraq
- International Textile Group, American textile firm
- International Trumpet Guild, trumpet players' organization
- Investment Technology Group, American firm
- In the Game Trading Cards, a manufacturer of hockey trading cards
- Institute of Tourist Guiding, UK's official tourist body
- Irish Traction Group, Irish railway preservation society
- ITG Brands, the US subsidiary of Imperial Tobacco Group

== Science and technology ==
- Integrin, a type of membrane protein
- Inferior temporal gyrus, a region of the brain
- IT governance

== Other uses ==
- In The Groove (video game), a music video game

== See also ==
- Interconnector Turkey–Greece–Italy (ITGI), a natural gas pipeline
