= Esso Power Players =

NHL Power Players
- Jacques Lemaire depicted on #25 card
- Type: Ice hockey card
- Company: Imperial Oil
- Country: Canada
- Availability: 1970–1971
- Features: NHL players

NHL Power Players (also known as Esso Power Players) was a hockey trading card scheme dreamed up by Imperial Oil (owner of the Esso brand) and the NHL Players' Association (NHLPA) during the 1970–71 hockey season.

Every time a customer purchased fuel at an Esso fuel station in Canada, they received a packet of six "Power Players Trader Stickers". These could be pasted into an album. Two albums were available: the standard (paperback) Edition and a deluxe (hardcover) edition. The front cover of the softcover album reads in French: "NHL Les Grands Du Hockey Album" and in English: "NHL Power Players Saver".

== Overview ==
In the French edition, the first team listed was Montreal Canadiens; in the English version, the first team was Toronto Maple Leafs. Each team had space for 18 player cards, which were about half the size of a hockey card, cut horizontally.

Along with the cards, collectors got a plastic wallet which folded in half and when opened, had four slots for storing cards. Later in the season, ESSO issued additional stickers for players traded during the season.

At the end of the season, it was possible to write to Esso to order any cards one did not have. When one received the cards, they also came with 252 additional stickers to go below the cards in the album. These additional stickers showed the games, goals, assists, points, and penalty minutes for each player.
