= Ricardo Garijo =

Argentine author, publisher and artist

- Born: December 1, 1953 Tandil, Buenos Aires Province, Argentina
- Died: October 4, 2009 (aged 55)
- Areas: Writer, Penciller

Ricardo Garijo (December 1, 1953 - October 3, 2009) was an Argentine author, publisher and artist, best known for his long career as a comics writer and artist.

== Biography ==
Garijo became known outside his homeland in the early 1980s through his work at D. C. Thomson before moving to European publications in the 1990s.

Since 1981, his work has gained an international audience in the Scottish war magazine, Commando. He is also co-publisher of his own comic magazine, Gurbos, which often deals with serious social themes.

In 2004, Garijo's first novel, El Fuego (The Fire) won the Honor's Prize from the Buenos Aires Writer's Society.

A year earlier, he painted the politically aware card series, Don't Let It Happen Here for Monsterwax. The series gained notoriety for profiling little known international atrocities, many of which went on to become well known news stories (like modern day slavery in Africa and honor killings in the Middle East). He has produced other trading cards for the same company including The Art of H. G. Wells, three series adapting three of Well's books: The Time Machine, The Island of Dr Moreau and The War of the Worlds.

Garijo continued to paint and one of his last works was another novel. It is said to be about his father's experiences as a prisoner in the Nazi concentration camp of Mauthausen.

He died on October 3, 2009, and was survived by his wife Adriana and their three children (including Ricardo Garijo, Jr, and accomplished artist in his own right).

== Bibliography ==
- Planeta de Acero (Steel Planet) – A daily science fiction comic strip for La Capital newspaper, Mar del Plata city (1979/1980)
- Lomax – Un viaje al espacio profundo (Lomax – Journey to the deep space) – A daily science fiction comic strip for La Razon newspaper, Buenos Aires (1981/1982)
- Commando (Illustrator since 1982)
- Corcoveando - Poetry book on horses Illustrated by Garijo (1985)
- Carol in Jail - Comic book released in Spain (1992)
- Carol in Buenos Aires - Comic published in Spain (1993)
- Gurbos - A comic magazine devoted to famous South American comic artists co-published with Raul Echegaray from 1997 to 2002)
- Taller Integral de Historietas (Making Comics) University textbook on how to make comics, co-written with Raul Echegaray (2001)
- Diaro de Plaza Moreno (Diary of Moreno Square) Graphic novel (2002)
- Don't Let It Happen Here - Trading card series painted by Garijo (2003)
- El Fuego (The Fire) Novel, 2004
- The Art of H. G. Wells - Trading card series painted by Garijo (2005)
- "Journey to the Center of the Earth and 20,000 Leagues Under The Sea" - Trading card series painted by Garijo (2009)

== Awards ==
- 2004 Honor's Prize from the Buenos Aires Writer's Society, for El Fuego.
