= Desert Storm trading cards =

Featuring people and equipment of the Gulf War

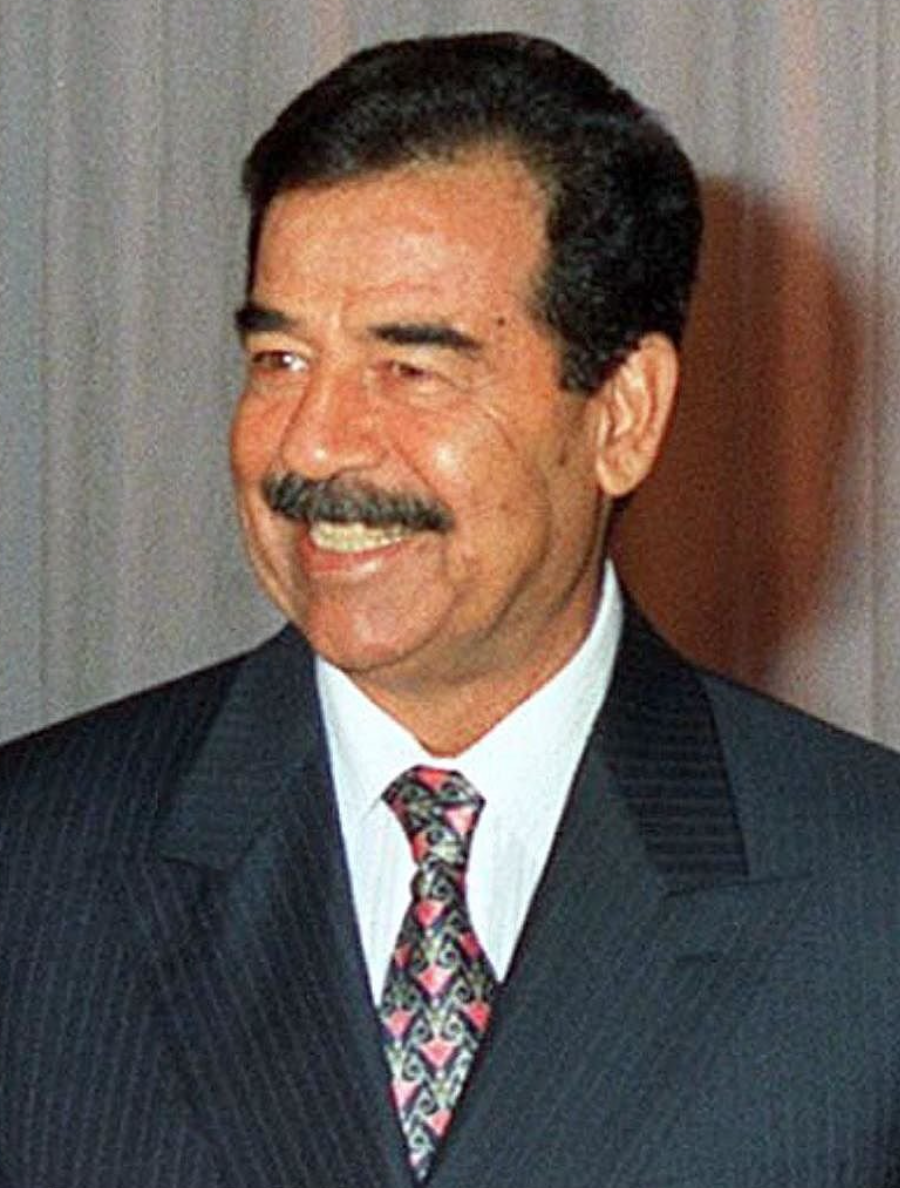
Saddam Hussein is generally the most sought after card, he is #168 in the Topps set and #69 in the Pro Set one

Desert Storm trading cards are sets of trading cards that feature people and equipment involved in the Gulf War. The cards were published in the United States by various companies and the size of sets varied greatly in between companies (such as the nine-card set published by Crown Sports Cards, and the 250 card-set published by Pro Set). The cards were claimed to be educational, with proceeds of the sales benefiting the children of Persian Gulf War veterans, and were produced at a time when the trading card industry was expanding its range well outside of the traditional sports figures. These sets were fairly popular in 1991 and each box used by retailers included 36 Packs.

== Topps set ==
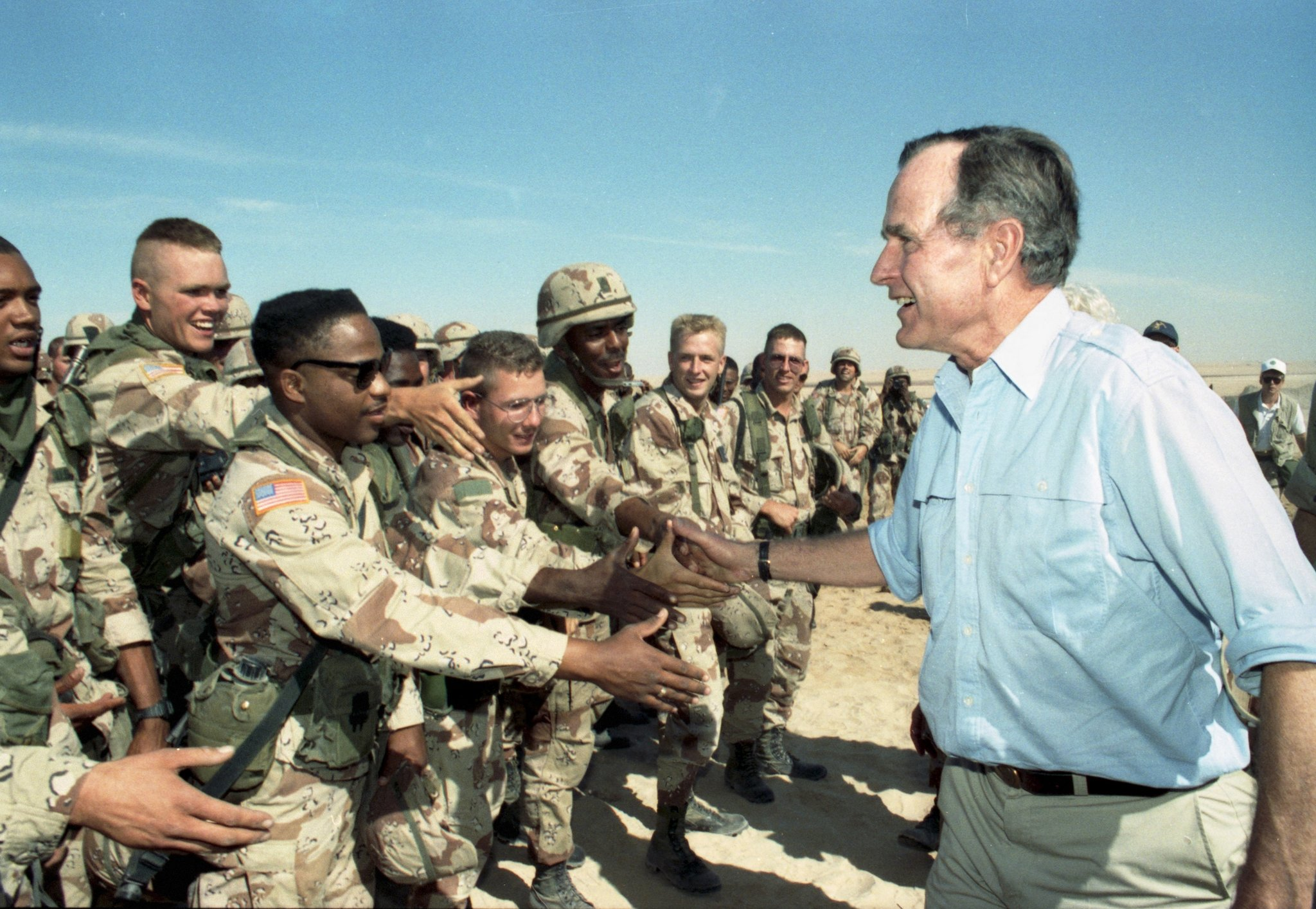
George H. W. Bush was featured as card #1 in the Topps set.

The Topps set is made up of 88 cards and 22 stickers, and includes images of people and materiel from all sides of the conflict. They display people such as Norman Schwarzkopf, Jr. and Dick Cheney, or military weapons or vehicles. As Commander in Chief, George H. W. Bush was featured as the first card in the series. The weapon and equipment cards give descriptions of each item's features, with information supplied by sources from The Pentagon and weapon suppliers. A package of eight cards and one sticker cost 50¢. Topps commented on the series stating it was "neither frivolous nor opportunistic", and the product did not "glamorize war". Topps insisted the cards provided adults and children educational information in a "non-sensational way".

Topps issued the Desert Storm Collector Cards in three series: Series I: Coalition For Peace, Series II: Victory Series and Series III: Homecoming Edition.

== Other sets ==
Pro Set entered the field after Topps did and, they claimed, they took their inspiration from the troops themselves, who supposedly asked the company, "Why don't you do a set of cards to tell Americans what we're doing over here." They published a set of 250 cards (including foreign leaders and countries of the middle east), sold in packs of ten, with proceeds going to "charities for the children of Desert Storm veterans", according to the company's president. Pacific Trading Cards published a 110-card set, and a set of nine caricatures was published by Crown Sports Cards.

== Background and popularity ==
=== Economic and political background ===
Desert Storm trading cards were part of a broader movement within the trading card industry, which looked to move away from an "oversaturated and...overpriced" market, and had begun printing cards featuring "cartoon heroes, television personalities, rock stars and even murderers".

According to Steven C. Dubin, they were indicative of a wave of "patriotic fervor" that swept the US at the time of Desert Storm. That the cards are iconic images of the combination of economics and patriotism has been noted by many writers.

=== Popularity and proceeds ===
The trading cards were popular outside of the typical "card collectors", and they sold quickly. Some stores sold their stock within hours of delivery, and others selling out within a week. Pro Set pledged to donate (the higher of) either $1 million or the entire proceeds from their Desert Storm trading card series to children of Desert Storm veterans, while Topps made unspecified donations, including to the United Service Organizations.

Their popularity was attested by Colin Powell, Chairman of the Joint Chiefs of Staff from 1989 to 1993, who said that at the time he spent "a good part of [his] time" signing cards. Ten years later, Topps revisited the idea by printing a set of similar cards related to Operation Enduring Freedom. Supposedly, the card with Norman Schwarzkopf, Jr. was the inspiration for the title of the Beastie Boys' 1992 album Check Your Head.

In the film Garden State (2004), a scene shows Andrew (Zach Braff) looking through a binder containing a near-complete set of the trading cards belonging to his friend, Mark (Peter Sarsgaard), who briefly discusses with him their significance.

== Criticism ==
The trading cards have come under attack for at least two reasons, accuracy and cultural impact. The information on some of the Topps cards was criticized as being incorrect (such as saying NATO had 27 members, when in 1991 it had sixteen), redundant (such as "ground combat infantryman"), blatantly obvious ("Transport ships carry enormous weights"), or "simply incomprehensible" (such as the vague statement "Range and accuracy (of missiles) varies from a few feet to several hundred miles").

== See also ==
- Most-wanted Iraqi playing cards
