= Non-sports trading card =

Type of collectible card

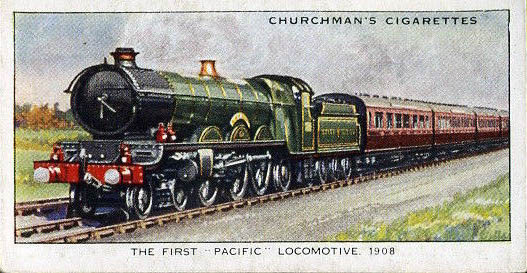
- First Pacific locomotive, by Churchman, 1935
- Type: Collector item
- Invented by: Tobacco manufacturers
- Availability: c. 1888–present
- Materials: Cardboard, plastic, silk

Trading cards have historically prominently featured athletes as subjects. Trading cards may also be distributed for non-sports subjects, such as media properties. See List of non-sports trading cards.

== History ==
The earliest popularly collected versions of most trading cards were issued as premiums in packages of cigarettes well over 100 years ago. While sport figures were most often the subject depicted on the card (usually issued one per pack), a wealth of various subjects from outside the world of sports were additionally featured on cigarette cards. These included people from the world of entertainment, exotic animals, and famous places, among various other non-sport subjects.

Eventually, as the cigarette makers ceased issuing cards in their products, both non-sport and sports cards were still sometimes given as a bonus with a stick of bubblegum or along with other food products including candy and cereal. By the 1950s both sports and non-sport cards had achieved a popularity that allowed them to become the selling point. A piece of gum was still included in most packs of non-sport cards up until approximately 1990, at which time gum stopped being included in the packs along with the cards. Very few card issues from the past 20 years have included bubble gum in the packs, making the once common term "bubble gum cards" a misnomer in the modern day.

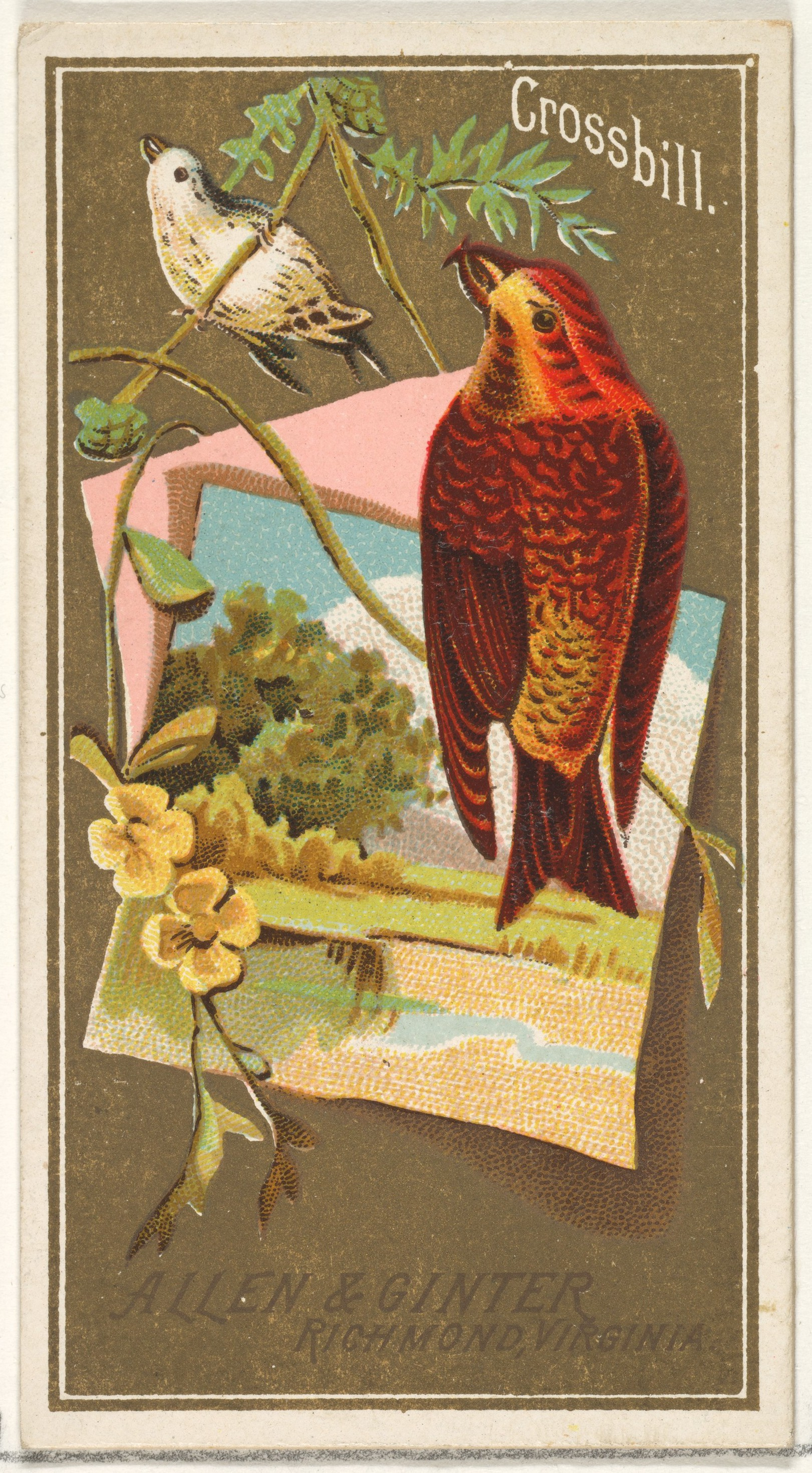
Allen & Ginter (now a Topps brand) featured several collections in the late 19th century, such as "Birds of America", c. 1888

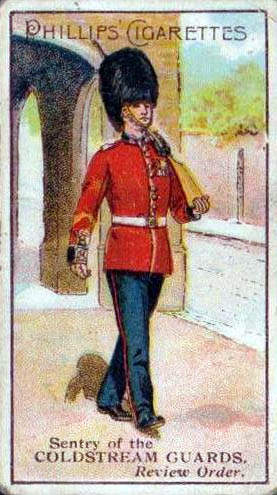
Coldstream Guards from the "Types of British Soldiers" Series by Godfrey Phillips, 1900

While non-sports cards initially showcased such real world subjects as entertainers, animals, and famous places, their success expanded with the introduction of new concepts created specifically for the cards including the popular Wacky Packages product label parody sticker cards from the Topps company, issued in their original run in the late 1960s through the mid-1970s. Cards depicting historical events have also proven popular over the years. Over the past 50 years, cards based on television series and movies have gained much traction in the hobby and today, media-based cards account for a significant portion of the cards produced. Some of the most popular media-based non-sport cards have been based on Star Wars, Star Trek, Batman (television and movies), Planet of the Apes, The Lord of the Rings, Buffy the Vampire Slayer, and many others. Other popular modern day non-sport cards are based on comic books including Marvel Comics, DC Comics and independent comic book publishers.

Cards based on movies and TV shows such as Star Wars or Supernatural often relate the story of the movie or series in both picture and editorial form. The front of the cards have a picture of an event or person in the movie or show, while the back describes the event pictured on the front. Often these sets will have character cards as well as behind the scenes or quote cards as well.

While most card sets include a title card and a checklist card, being the first and last cards respectively, most Non-Sport Card sets now include different levels of insert cards in the packs. Topps and other companies started this by including a sticker in each pack of cards. Now inserts can include autograph cards, sketch cards, cards that complete a nine card puzzle, memorabilia, costume and prop cards along with parallel sets which mimic the normal cards in the set with some slight difference like the color of the border or the finish on the card.

In recent years, Non-Sport cards have overlapped with the newer phenomenon of collectible card games. For example, the Pokémon craze yielded a trading card game, produced by Wizards of the Coast, and regular trading card sets by Topps and others that were not designed for gameplay.

== Sketch cards ==
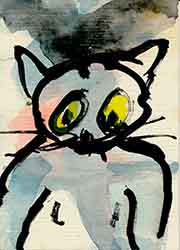
A sketch trading card by M. Vänçi Stirnemann

A sketch card displays original artwork on a standard-size trading card, usually measuring 2.5" (65mm) × 3.5" (90mm). These cards, with black-and-white or color original art, have been randomly inserted into various trading card sets since the 1990s. The first set to name, market and produce pack-inserted sketch cards was the Defective Comics trading cards set of 1993 from Active Marketing International, illustrated by Mark Voger. Another early example was the 1993 Simpsons set from SkyBox International that had 400 redemptions for an "Art De Bart Card".

The sketch card insert has been most common in non-sport trading card sets like The Lord of the Rings: Evolution, Star Wars: Clone Wars and Scooby-Doo: Mysteries & Monsters. A few sport sets have also adopted the idea like the 2005 Topps Gallery Baseball. One of the all-time most popular sets was the 1998 Marvel Creator's Collection by Fleer. They called their sketch cards "sketchagraph" cards. The set was popular because it used the artistic skills of hundreds of different artists who were allowed to draw any character in the Marvel Comics universe.

Sketch card inserts have usually come one-per-box of trading cards, but some sets like Hulk by Topps came one in 12 boxes, and The Lord of the Rings: Masterpieces by Topps come two per box. Some companies even offer oversize (3×5 inch) sketch cards as case premiums like Fathom by Dynamic Forces.

A few of the titles that sketch cards go by include:

- Sketchagraph (Fleer/SkyBox)
- Sketchafex (Rittenhouse)
- Art De Bart (Fleer/SkyBox)

== Autograph cards ==
Although earlier sports sets contained autograph cards, cards hand signed by celebrities related to the non-sports cards in question, started to become more common when Imagine, Inc. included autograph cards in their 1988 Night of the Living Dead set. and SkyBox inserted original series signatures, at a ratio of one per box, in the Star Trek: The Original Series set issues in 1997. Other companies, including Topps, Rittenhouse Archives and Inkworks, started to add autograph cards to their sets and now, many collectors routinely expect to find at least one autograph per box. Cards are signed by cast members, behind-the-scenes creatives and in the case of some sets based on TV series Lexx, by artists contributing art for the set.

Some manufacturers have used such variations as dual autographs, triple autographs (and more!), autographed memorabilia cards and cut autographs, where a signature from a check or other document is secured into a specially produced card. Topps, Inkworks and others have used holographic or foil stickers, which are signed then affixed to the card. Collector opinions on these sticker cards has been mixed.

== Memorabilia, costume and prop cards ==
Some manufacturers, notably Topps, Inkworks and Rittenhouse Archives, have included memorabilia or costume cards, each card containing a small piece of costume or other clothing worn in a TV series or film. As with autograph cards, these have become increasingly common. Some manufacturers insert them at the ratio of one or two per box and have tried such innovations as autographed memorabilia cards, dual memorabilia cards (containing two related pieces of material) and prop cards, containing fragments of props used in the production of a particular film or TV series. One set, for the TV series Buffy the Vampire Slayer, issued by Inkworks, had pieces of the stake used by Buffy to kill vampires.

Most are pack-inserted, though some of the thicker cards are only available by redemption such as in The Walking Dead (TV series), Smallville and The Big Bang Theory series, all made by Cryptozoic Entertainment.

== Distribution ==
Non-sport trading cards have been distributed many different ways. The most common way to buy cards was in what was called Wax Packs. Five to eight cards were wrapped in a type of wax paper that had a graphic of the set on the front of the paper. These were sold in grocery stores, in toy stores and small vending machines. These packs were sold individually or in a box of 24 packs.

Today most card packs are made out of foil or plastic and are sold in comic book stores and at some big box retailers like Target and Wal-Mart. Some of these retailers do sell cards by pack as well as in a small box containing five to ten packs of cards sometimes with an extra insert card included. Some also sell rack packs which are normally three packs of cards packaged together on a peg hook or carded package.

Artbox sold some Harry Potter and Charlie and the Chocolate Factory movie cards in a tin boxes which held several packs of cards and a special insert set that could only be found in the boxes.

Prior to the release of a new set, the manufacturer will distribute promo cards at conventions, in magazines and to retailers to promote the set. These cards have a typical common card image on the front and release dates on the back.

Other collectible promotional material include sell sheets, which are sent to retailers to let them know about the breakdown (boxes per case, chase card rarity) of the set to help them estimate how much product to buy.

=== Other methods of distribution ===
- Inside or on the back of cereal boxes
- Packaged with toys
- Given away as promotion for a movie or product
- Inside magazines, newspapers or comic books
- At an event or destination, such as a National Park or museum

== Trading card series ==
Hundred of card sets have been released since the late 1890s, most of them inspired on television series/shows, movies or popular fictional characters, among others.

== Manufacturers ==
This list contains companies that produce, or have produced, non-sports trading cards only. This list does not contain all the brand names associated with their respective manufacturers.

Manufacturer	Cartoon	Collectible Card Game	Comic book	Historic	Music	Movie/ Television
5Finity	Yes	No	Yes	No	No	No
Bushiroad	No	Yes	No	No	No	No
Cartamundi	No	Yes	No	No	No	No
Cryptozoic	Yes	Yes	Yes	No	No	Yes
Cult Stuff	Yes	No	Yes	Yes	No	No
Dart Flipcards	No	No	No	No	Yes	Yes
Decipher	No	Yes	No	No	No	No
Digimon	Yes	Yes	Yes	No	No	Yes
Fantom	Yes	Yes	Yes	Yes	Yes	Yes
Gravestone Cards	Yes	Yes	Yes	No	No	Yes
Heavy Trading Cards	No	No	No	Yes	No	No
Hidden City	No	Yes	No	No	No	No
Konami	Yes	Yes	Yes	Yes	Yes	Yes
Monsterwax	No	No	No	No	No	Yes
Nintendo	No	Yes	No	No	No	No
Press Pass	No	No	No	No	Yes	No
Quality Playing	Yes	Yes	Yes	Yes	Yes	Yes
Score	No	Yes	No	No	No	Yes
Topps	Yes	Yes	Yes	Yes	Yes	Yes
Trash Panda Cards	No	No	No	Yes	No	No
Wax Eye	Yes	Yes	No	No	No	No
Webkinz	No	Yes	No	No	No	No
Wizards of the Coast	No	Yes	Yes	No	No	No

== See also ==
- Trading card
- Cigarette card
- Collectible card game
- Non-Sport Update

== Bibliography ==
- Fleer Corp. v. Topps Chewing Gum, Inc., 501 F.Supp. 485 (E.D. Pa. 1980).
- Benjamin, Christopher et al. (1988). "The Sport Americana price guide to the non-sports cards". Edgewater Book Co.-Cleveland, Ohio ISBN 0-937424-36-6
