= O-Pee-Chee =

Canadian confectionery company

O-Pee-Chee Company, Ltd.

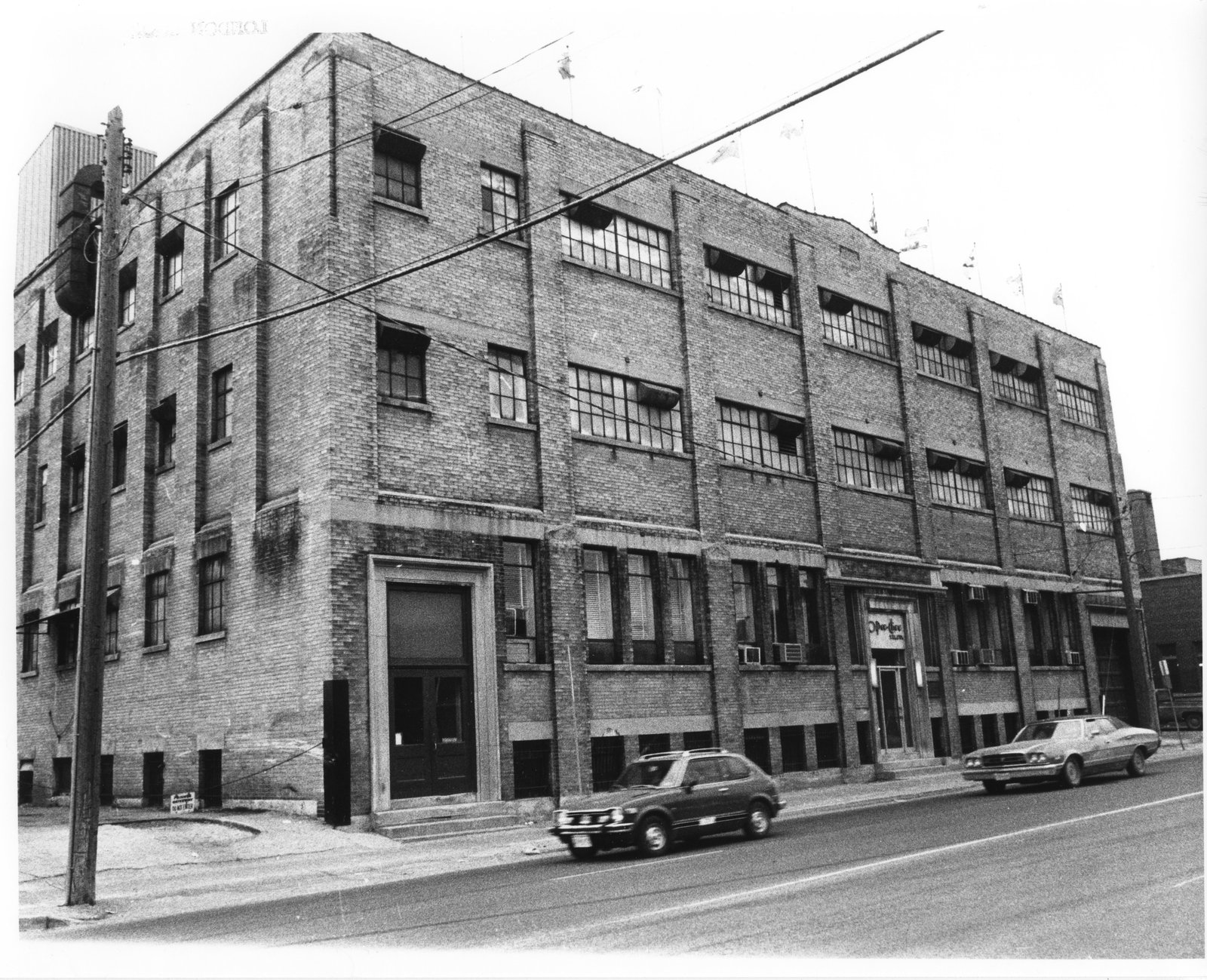
- O-Pee-Chee main building in London, Ontario. It was used until 1989 when a new plant was built in London East
- Trade name: O-Pee-Chee
- Formerly: O-Pee-Chee Gum Company (1911–1921)
- Type: Public (1911–21); Private (1921–96)
- Industry: Candy, Collectables
- Founded: 1911
- Founder: J.K. McDermid; D.H. McDermid
- Defunct: 1996; 30 years ago
- Fate: Acquired by Nestlé in 1996, merged to it becoming a brand
- Headquarters: London, Ontario, Canada
- Area served: United States, Canada
- Key people: Frank P. Leahy (President)
- Products: Bubble gum Mint; Pop corn Trading cards (1930s–94)
- Owner: (Brand name): Topps (1996–2006); Upper Deck (2006–present)

The O-Pee-Chee Company, Ltd. was a Canadian confectionery company founded in 1911 based in London, Ontario. O-Pee-Chee was best known as a maker of trading cards. It entered into a marketing agreement with the Topps Company in 1958, releasing several collections of baseball, gridiron football, and ice hockey cards until 1994.

O-Pee-Chee's candy business was sold to Nestlé in 1996. The "O-Pee-Chee" name was licensed by Topps and later by Upper Deck, which continues to use it for hockey cards to the present day.

== History ==
=== Beginning ===
The O-Pee-Chee Gum Company got its start in 1911 when brothers John McKinnon (J.K.) McDermid and Duncan Hugh (D.H.) McDermid started to manufacture chewing gum. According to O-Pee-Chee literature, both brothers had been in the gum business and knew the business very well. The brothers had worked for C.R. Somerville, a gum manufacturing plant in London, Ontario. After the Somerville firm was sold to American Chicle Company in 1908 and the plant moved to Toronto, the McDermid brothers took over the box division and eventually purchased it in 1910 (Somerville Paper Box Limited). Shortly thereafter, they started O-Pee-Chee and produced their first box of Gipsy gum.

O-Pee-Chee chewing gum ad in The Aylmer Express newspaper, June 1912

The name O-Pee-Chee is an Ojibwe word meaning "the Robin" as is found in The Song of Hiawatha by Henry Wadsworth Longfellow. It also happened to be the name of McDermid's summer cottage in Grand Bend, Ontario.

In terms of company genealogy, the McDermids owned the O-Pee-Chee Company Limited (as renamed in 1921) and Somerville Paper Box Limited until 1944. They sold Somerville Paper Box Limited to Garfield Weston in 1945 and changed their own O-Pee-Chee Co. Ltd. from a public company (since 1921) to a private company. The company was now run by John Gordon McDermid, the son and nephew of the McDermid brothers. The younger McDermid ran the company until his death in 1953 after which Frank Leahy took over the company. Leahy was the President of the O-Pee-Chee Co. Ltd. before he purchased the company from the McDermid estate in 1961. Leahy ran the business until his death in 1980, after which Gary Koreen stepped in and purchased the company from his wife, Mary-Margaret (the daughter of Frank Leahy).

The sales for the first year of operation of O-Pee-Chee Company Limited were $177,389.84 with a profit of $4,766.92. The products manufactured were chewing gum, mints and various types of popcorn - especially Krackley Nut. In that year, there were 30 employees in the plant and the annual payroll was $31,614.38, including management salaries and bonuses.

In 1921, O-Pee-Chee Gum Company was sold to a trust with the intent of incorporating the Company and changing its name to "O-Pee-Chee Company Limited". Initially, it was incorporated as a public Company with five shareholders and four directors - all members of the McDermid family.

O-Pee-Chee chewing gum label, 1930

In 1928, a manufacturing facility was built at 430 Adelaide Street in London. Initially, this plant was erected primarily to supply a substantial export gum business to the United Kingdom. From 1928 until 1989, this plant housed some of the most modern gum and candy making equipment available in the world.

During the Depression years, the Company operated mainly at a loss. In 1933, a licensing agreement was signed with a Buffalo firm, W & F Manufacturing, Co. who made paraffin chewing gum and novelties. This allowed O-Pee-Chee to sell these products in Canada as well as in Great Britain and Ireland. In the mid-1950s, Gurley Novelties, a candle company in Buffalo, New York, also signed with O-Pee-Chee, so candles could be sold In Great Britain, Ireland and eventually Canada. O Pee Chee sold Gurley Novelty candles under the name Gaybrite and TinselTown in Ireland and Scotland. About this time, Frank P. Leahy joined the firm as Sales Manager and John Gordon McDermid, the son of J.K. McDermid, also became active in the business.

=== Entering into the trading card market ===
Trading cards were a big part of the O-Pee-Chee business. Their first card sets were produced in the mid 1930s: a baseball "diamond" set (much larger than traditional cards) in 1934, five hockey sets between 1934 and 1938, a new baseball set in 1937, a Mickey Mouse set in 1935, and a Fighting Forces set in 1939. They made a few more sets in the 1940s, but it was not until the late 1950s that the company started to distribute cards on a regular basis.

The McDermids owned and operated both O-Pee-Chee Company Limited and Somerville Paper Box Limited until 1944 when they sold the Somerville business to Garfield Weston. In 1945, O-Pee-Chee Company Limited was changed from a public company to a private company. For many years, National Novelty Company was a subsidiary of O-Pee-Chee Company acting as a retail outlet, selling candy goods over the counter, and also servicing gum vending machines in the area.

With the arrival of World War II, accompanied by sugar and other commodity rationing, O-Pee-Chee Company existed mainly because of war contracts to supply dried egg powder to Europe and the United Kingdom. Employees, who worked at O-Pee-Chee during the war, recall the incident when a boat carrying a load of egg powder was sunk in the St. Lawrence River by a German submarine and the shipment had to be returned to London for repacking. During this time, the only gum product manufactured was Thrills –a product which is still being sold today.

D.H. McDermid died in December 1942 and J.K. McDermid died of a heart attack in 1945 at age 79. J.K. was a charter member of the London Rotary Club and was an active executive of the Red Cross and YMCA. He was a prominent member of the Talbot Street Baptist Church and deeded his property to the congregation where the First Baptist Church now stands in London. John Gordon McDermid became President in 1946 and ran the Company until his death in 1953.

Under the new President, Frank P. Leahy, the Company flourished in the late 1950s. In 1958, a licensing agreement was arranged with a manufacturer in Brooklyn, New York, which dramatically increased the future potential of O-Pee-Chee Company. Subsequent to this, in 1961, Frank Leahy purchased the Company from the McDermid estate.

About this time, another licensing agreement was signed with a large candy company located in St. Louis, Missouri. These two licensing arrangements, which still exist today, allowed O-Pee-Chee Company to manufacture and market the products of these two firms in Canada. Immediately, new products became available to the Canadian market which substantially increased the Company's sales volume, allowing for more efficient manufacturing and marketing techniques.

=== Deals with U.S. companies ===
In 1958, after the O-Pee-Chee Company entered into a marketing agreement with the Topps Company of the United States, O-Pee-Chee promoted annual trading card sets in Canada. Popular with kids, the standard packs included a stick of bubble gum with a stack of picture cards. In that first year, O-Pee-Chee helped produce hockey (1957-58 NHL) and football (1958 CFL) cards.

In the 1960s, O-Pee-Chee and Topps worked closely together to produce sports and entertainment sets. The three sports promoted by O-Pee-Chee were baseball, gridiron football and ice hockey. Starting in 1961, the printing and production for these cards was moved to the O-Pee-Chee headquarters in London, Ontario, Canada. Those first Canadian sets were the 1961 CFL and 1961-62 NHL sets. While those two sets were unique to the Canadian marketplace, the hockey series did compete against a Parkies hockey series up until 1963-64. Starting in 1965, parts (or sometimes all) of the Topps baseball (Major League Baseball) series was produced as an O-Pee-Chee series in Canada.

In the early 1960s, Beatlemania overtook North America, with O-Pee-Chee Company having the rights to manufacture and market the Beatle Bubble Gum Cards for the Canadian market. In 1964, O-Pee-Chee produced four very popular entertainment card series featuring The Beatles. Up until 1967, the annual O-Pee-Chee (also known as Topps) hockey series was produced in Canada. After an American Topps "test" series was produced in the summer of 1967 (it looked just like the regular Canadian 1966-67 hockey series), O-Pee-Chee and Topps produced two annual hockey sets from 1968-69 onwards. The hockey double (an O-Pee-Chee set in Canada and a Topps set in the United States) coincided with the NHL's 1967 expansion from 6 to 12 teams. So while the 1967-68 series highlighted a six-team NHL, the two 1968-69 series highlighted a 12-team NHL. Of note, the Topps set would often be released first, but would include fewer cards than the O-Pee-Chee series. Also of interest, the card backs were primarily written by Topps, but the O-Pee-Chee card backs added a French translation.

In 1970, due to Canadian federal legislation, O-Pee-Chee was compelled to add French-language text to the backs of its baseball cards. It also happened to be the year after the Montreal Expos began to play in the majority Francophone province of Quebec. The practise of making bilingual cards had already been established for hockey. While O-Pee-Chee baseball sets were typically smaller than their Topps counterparts, its hockey sets for the Canadian market were larger. O-Pee-Chee also occasionally produced independent card sets of particular interest to Canadian collectors, such as one for the 1973 centennial of the Royal Canadian Mounted Police.

In the 1970s, O-Pee-Chee's last CFL set was produced in 1972. After World Hockey Association cards were first featured in the 1972-73 hockey series, an annual WHA series was produced from 1974-75 to 1977-78. Apart from sports card, the company also produced movie and TV "spin-off" cards such as Happy Days (1976), Charlie's Angels (1977) and Superman (1978). From 1977 to 1989, O-Pee-Chee produced cards based on popular motion pictures including Star Wars (1977), The Empire Strikes Back (1980), Return of the Jedi (1983), E.T. (1982), and Batman Returns (1992).

In the 1980s, O-Pee-Chee (and Topps) produced annual album and sticker series for hockey and baseball (with the stickers produced by Panini). The stickers were so popular that Topps neglected to produce a hockey card series in either 1982–83 or 1983–84 (in fact, the stickers were so popular that by 1987–88, Panini had obtained its own license to produce NHL stickers in Canada).

After working at O-Pee-Chee Company for nearly 50 years, Frank Leahy died suddenly in 1980. Gary E. Koreen, his son-in-law, who had been active in the business since 1968, became president and owner of the business.

In 1989, O-Pee-Chee Company moved into a new plant in London East which accommodated all manufacturing, raw material and finished goods storage, and offices and employee facilities. For years, the Lawson Jones printing company in London, Ontario print labels but they also did all, for years the O-Pee-Chee cards. They printed them and sent them to O-Pee-Chee to put the gum in them (Hockey Card Stories by Ken Reid, page 211).

In 1990–91, O-Pee-Chee and Topps were joined in the NHL card market by Pro Set, Score and Upper Deck. That year, O-Pee-Chee produced a unique O-Pee-Chee Premier hockey series that was wildly popular with card collectors. Both an O-Pee-Chee and O-Pee-Chee Premier hockey series was produced in each of three successive seasons, but then in 1993-94 and 1994–95, only a Premier series was produced. As for baseball, the O-Pee-Chee Premier MLB series was produced from 1991 to 1993, while the last O-Pee-Chee MLB series was produced in 1994.

=== Acquisition and licensing ===
O-Pee-Chee (brand)
- Product type: Trading cards
- Current owner: Upper Deck (2006–present)
- Country: USA
- Introduced: 1996; 30 years ago
- Previous owners: O-Pee-Chee Company Ltd. (1911–96); Topps (1996–2006)
- Website: o-pee-chee.com

The 1994 Major League Baseball strike and 1994–95 NHL lockout and the accompanying damage to the baseball card industry hit O-Pee-Chee particularly hard. The company announced that it would leave the card business and refocus its efforts on candy. However, a number of changing circumstances kept them in the card business, as well as candy.

The 1994–95 hockey season was the last for O-Pee-Chee as a full independent company. In 1996, O-Pee-Chee was bought by the Nestlé Corporation. After Koreen sold the company, he kept the O-Pee-Chee brand name alive in the trading card market through a license with Topps. Topps continued to produce O-Pee-Chee branded insert and parallel hockey cards from 1996 through the 2003–04 hockey season. In 1995–96, Topps included O-Pee-Chee cards in its signature product as a parallel set. It did the same in 1998–99 when it returned to the NHL market after a two-year hiatus. Later that year, O-Pee-Chee was re-introduced fully, as Topps used the company name for its Chrome set. One year later, O-Pee-Chee once again had a base-brand set.

Prior to the start of the 2004–05 season, the NHL and NHLPA did not renew its hockey card license with Topps (as well as In The Game or Pacific). Upper Deck had prior maintained NHL and NHLPA trading card licenses since the 1990–91 season. The NHL and NHLPA decided to enter into an exclusive five-year agreement with Upper Deck to produce licensed NHL cards. Panini America was granted a license to produce NHL hockey cards in 2010, but Upper Deck regained exclusive rights again starting with the 2014–15 season. Upper Deck renewed its exclusive license contract with the NHL and NHLPA in 2019, and again in 2021, for an unspecified "long term" duration.

In 2006, Upper Deck acquired the rights to the O-Pee-Chee brand to revive it with new trading card products. Upper Deck's initial O-Pee-Chee Hockey product was released during the 2006-07 season, and has continuously produced licensed hockey cards under various brands, including O-Pee-Chee, to this day, though not strictly for the Canadian market.

To extend Upper Deck's use of the O-Pee-Chee brand, they released a 1969 retro-styled O-Pee-Chee insert in 2008 Upper Deck Baseball. This continued again a year later with a 1975-inspired insert in 2009 Upper Deck Baseball. Upper Deck further expanded the brand's presence in 2009 by also introducing a full set release with the O-Pee-Chee name. That year's O-Pee-Chee Baseball set featured a large checklist, classic grey card stock, and a more generically vintage-inspired design.

Between 2008–2010, the O-Pee-Chee brand became the center of a lawsuit between Upper Deck and Topps. Topps accused Upper Deck of designing their new cards to be too similar to their classic O-Pee-Chee card designs from prior decades. The two parties settled and Upper Deck refrained from reusing old Topps/O-Pee-Chee designs in future products. In 2010, Upper Deck lost its Major League Baseball license, and as a result, there still hasn't been a new baseball O-Pee-Chee product released since 2009.

Vintage O-Pee-Chee cards are sought-after for their market value, and cards of popular players, when in good condition, may command high prices.

== Products ==
O-Pee-Chee sold a number of products in the Canadian marketplace, including:

=== Candy products ===
- Bazooka Gum
- Nerds Candy
- SweeTarts
- Tart N Tinys
- Ton 'o' Gum
- Thrills Gum
- Fun Dip

=== Trading cards ===
==== Sports ====
- NHL Hockey (1933–1941, 1957–1995)
- MLB Baseball (1934, 1937, 1965–1994)
- CFL Football (1960–1972)

==== Non-sports ====
- Giant Funny Valentines (1961)
- The Beatles (1964)
- The Outer Limits (1964)
- The Man from U.N.C.L.E. (1965)
- Batman (1966)
- Bat Laffs (1966)
- Rat Patrol (1966)
- Mod Squad (1968)
- Rowan and Martin's Laugh-in (1968)
- Man on the Moon (1969)
- Planet of the Apes (1969)
- Flags of the World Sticker Cards (1970)
- The Partridge Family (1971)
- Wacky Packages Sticker Cards (1973, 1982, 1987–1992)
- Royal Canadian Mounted Police (1973)
- Far-Out Iron-Ons (1975)
- Happy Days (1976)
- Welcome Back Kotter (1976)
- Star Wars (1977)
- Charlie's Angels (1977)
- Jaws 2 (1978)
- Superman The Movie (1978)
- Moonraker (1979)
- Empire Strikes Back (1980)
- Raiders of the Lost Ark (1981)
- E.T. The Extra Terrestrial (1982)
- Return of the Jedi (1983)
- Voltron (1984)
- Gremlins (1984)
- Michael Jackson (1984)
- WWF Wrestling (1985)
- WWF Wrestling (1987)
- Fright Flicks (1988)
- New Kids on the Block (1989)
- Batman (1989)
- Ghostbusters II (1989)
- Nintendo GamePack (1989)
- Dick Tracy (1990)
- Teenage Mutant Ninja Turtles (1990)
- Batman Returns (1992)
- Jurassic Park (1993)

== Bibliography ==
- Print editions of Canadian Sports Collector, including a two-part series on the history of O-Pee-Chee (published 2005, written by Bobby Burrell).
- Print edition of Charlton Hockey Cards (2006). Trajan Publishing.
- Print edition of Vintage Hockey Collector's Price Guide (2006). Burrell, Bobby.
- Beckett, Dr. James et al. (2002). "Beckett Baseball Card Price Guide". Beckett Publications-Dallas, Texas ISBN 1-930692-17-X
