= Pacific Trading Cards, Inc. =

American trading card company

- Type: Private
- Industry: Collectibles
- Predecessor: Cramer Promotions
- Founded: Edmonds, Washington, U.S. (1980)
- Founder: Mike Cramer
- Successor: Playoff Corp. Panini Group
- Headquarters: Lynnwood, Washington, United States
- Key people: Mike Cramer
- Products: Trading cards, bobbleheads
- Number of employees: 230

Pacific Trading Cards, Inc. was an American trading card company founded in 1980 by Mike Cramer and known for its brightly colored, die cut cards. The company introduced to collectors the nine-card plastic sheets collectors use to store trading cards. The company also produced memorabilia such as bobbleheads and the Ken Griffey Jr. chocolate bar.

== Company history ==
=== Early years ===
Mike Cramer, the founder of Pacific Trading Cards, began collecting baseball cards at nine years old. His first card was a Babe Ruth card from a nickel pack of Fleer 1960 All-Time Greats cards. He began selling soda bottles and mowing lawns so that he could buy more cards, collecting over 11,000 cards by the time he was eleven years old. By the time he was fifteen, Cramer had collected more than 500,000 cards. He ran ads, buying and selling cards from his family home in Arizona. Beginning in 1969, Cramer spent ten seasons Alaskan king crab fishing, earning and saving money which he later used to purchase his first home and found Pacific Trading Cards. He married his wife, Cheryl, in 1973 in Dutch Harbor, Alaska, and she began helping him with his trading cards business, even helping him move boxes trading cards onto his boat on their wedding night. In 1977, Cramer entered into a deal with Topps and purchased all of their closeout cases of cards. Cramer stored truckloads of trading cards in a storage unit. Cramer began running a mail-order catalog from his home in Edmonds, Washington, and began buying and selling cards full-time.

=== 1980s ===
In 1980, Cramer opened a trading cards store in the Perrinville neighborhood of Edmonds. There was a warehouse factory across the street that began producing trading cards for the Triple-A Pacific Coast League. Pacific was the first company to begin selling plastic sheets to put trading cards in binders. As the company began making cards, Cramer shot many of the card photos himself.

In 1989, Cramer built a manufacturing plant in Lynnwood, Washington, which produced the company's cards. At its height, the factory employed 230 people. The company released a Ken Griffey Jr. chocolate bar in 1989 after converting one of their card-wrapping machines to wrap chocolate bars, selling almost one million bars.

=== 1990s ===
By 1990, Pacific was manufacturing and distributing ten lines of trading cards including Major Indoor Soccer League, Baseball Legend, and Senior Baseball League. Following the success of the Ken Griffey Jr. candy bar in the year prior, Pacific also released two collector's candy bars named for baseball players Tony Gwynn and Wade Boggs.

In 1991, Pacific received a license to produce NFL trading cards. That year, Pacific also released a set of 110 Desert Shield trading cards featuring leaders, weapons, and soldiers involved in Operation Desert Shield. Pacific released sets of non-sports trading cards for I Love Lucy and the 30th anniversary of The Andy Griffith Show.

In 1993, Pacific finally received its first Major League Baseball license and began producing MLB cards in the Spanish language. While other companies had done bilingual French and English hockey cards, Pacific was the first company to make bilingual baseball cards in Spanish.

By 1998 Pacific held a license to manufacture trading cards for all three major sports leagues, Major League Baseball, NFL Football and NHL Hockey. Pacific brands for the three major sports cards licenses included Pacific, Prism (now Prizm) Crown Royale, Invincible, Paramount, Aurora, Revolution, Omega, and Vanguard.

In 1999, Pacific released the first-ever Kurt Warner and in 2000 Tom Brady rookie cards. While Cramer was in Northern California for the annual East-West Shrine Bowl, he shot dozens of photos of Brady, who was a quarterback at Michigan at the time. Brady was not invited to the 2000 NFLPA Rookie Photo Shoot because he was a sixth-round pick, but Cramer used the photos he had shot and put Brady in Pacific's 2000 NFL sets. Pacific released its first set in May 2000, making Pacific's #403 Brady card the first NFL trading card ever produced of Brady. The company also signed Brady to an autograph deal, getting a total of 700 cards signed. In 2021, one of Tom Brady's Pacific rookie cards sold for $117,000.

=== 2000s ===
Pacific was the first to reintroduced the T206 style baseball cards to the hobby. The PS206 cards first appeared in their 2000 Private Stock baseball brand. The cards were very popular with collectors and Pacific expanded the PS206 series to include them in their NFL football and NHL hockey Private Stock line.

In 2000, Pacific Trading Cards released a Manny Ramirez baseball card featuring a corked bat, causing controversy. Many people thought that releasing a card featuring a corked bat was a publicity stunt, but employees from Pacific claim that is not the case. Cramer claims the bats were sourced from the teams and then sent away to be cut up. The pieces of the bats were then sent to Great Western Press, where the baseball cards were printed. The cards were finally sent back to Lynnwood and were packaged at Pacific's headquarters. They later found out that a card with a piece of cork was sent to a dealer and Pacific immediately stopped production and went through the cards, finding a few more which were not released.

In 2001 Pacific released two Major League Baseball card products Pacific and Private Stock. They also produced a full line of NFL and NHL cards. That year saw the emergence of several prominent Rookies including Drew Brees.

In 2003, Pacific NFL license was not renewed. The National Football League Players Association pulled Pacific's license after sports card shop owners complained that there were too many card brands and products. Ironically there are far more NFL card product brands made in 2025. By 2004, the only major license Pacific held was for the National Hockey League. When the 2004–05 NHL lockout started, Cramer decided to retire and sold Pacific Trading Cards to Playoff. Playoff was later sold to Panini Group, which continued Pacific's Prism line under the slightly altered name "Prizm".

== Products ==
=== Sports trading cards ===
==== Baseball ====
- Minor League Baseball Cards (1975-1986)
- Major League Baseball Cards (1980-2002)
- Pacific Eight Men Out (1988)
- Pacific Legends (1980–1990)
- Pacific Senior League (1989–1990)
- Pacific Tom Seaver "Tom Terrific" (1991)
- Nolan Ryan Texas Express Series II (1991)
- Pacific Jugadoes Calientes (1993)
- Pacific Prisms (–1996)
- Pacific Mariners (1995)
- Pacific Harvey Riebe (1995)
- Pacific Advil Nolan Ryan (1996)
- Pacific Marlins (1997)
- Aurora (1998–2000)
- Pacific Omega Baseball (1998)
- Pacific Home Run Heroes (1998)
- Pacific Home Run History (1998)
- Crown Royale Baseball (1998–2000)
- Revolution (1998–2000)
- Pacific Nestle (1998)
- Paramount (1998–2000)
- Pacific Crown Collection (1999–2000)
- Private Stock (1999)
- Pacific Vanguard (2000)
- Paramount Update (2000)

==== Football ====
- NFL Football (1991–2002)
- NFL Steve Largent (1988)
- NFL Orowheat Seattle Seahawks (1988–1992)

==== Ice Hockey ====
- NHL Hockey (1997–2005)

NHL Hockey McDonalds (1998–2003)

==== Soccer ====
- Major Indoor Soccer League (1988–1993)

=== Softball ===
- Pacific Baerga Softball (1996–1997)

=== Nonsports trading cards ===
- Wizard of Oz (1990)
- Operation Desert Shield (1991)
- I Love Lucy (1991)
- The Andy Griffith Show (1991)
- Saved By the Bell (1992)
- Saved by the Bell Collage Years (1994)
- Rad Dudes (1991)
- Leave it to Beaver (1983)
- World War II (1992)
- Total Recall (1990)
- Gunsmoke (1992)
- Where are They (1992)
- Eight Men Out (1988)
- Garfield (2000)
- Bingo Movie (1991)
- Pukey-mon(2000)

=== Chocolate bars ===
Chocolate bars came with a limited edition baseball card:

- Ken Griffey Jr. (1989)
- Tony Gwynn (1990)
- Wade Boggs (1990)

=== Memorabilia ===
- Heads Up Bobbleheads
- NHL Mini Sweaters

== Memoir ==
In October 2023, Cramer's book, Cramer's Choice: Memoir of a Baseball Card Collector Turned Manufacturer was published by McFarland & Company. Cramer began writing the book a few years prior, after he was diagnosed with a rare form of lymphoma, intending to document his life for his children and grandchildren. Bob Uecker had originally given Cramer the idea for the book. He wrote 117,000 words on an iPad, letter by letter, and later sent it to McFarland, which immediately accepted the manuscript. The final product is about 90,000 words.
