= Error card =

Misprinted trading card

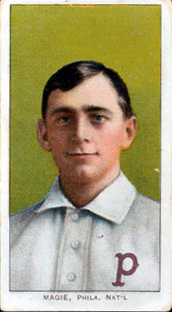
- T206 Sherry Magee card, with his name misspelled as "Magie"
- Type: Trading card
- Company: American Tobacco; Bowman; Topps
- Country: United States
- Availability: 1909–present
- Features: Baseball card

In the trading card–collecting hobby, an error card is a card that shows incorrect information or some other unintended flaw. It can contain a mistake, such as a misspelling or a photo of someone other than the athlete named on the card. Depending on whether the manufacturer noticed the problem while the cards were still being produced, a card may exist in both correct and incorrect versions. If the correction is made sufficiently early in the print run, the error card may be significantly rarer and more valuable than the corrected version. However, the opposite may be true if the error is corrected late in the printing cycle, resulting in a smaller population of the corrected version of the card compared to the error version.

If the manufacturer never made a correction, the card is considered an "uncorrected error". Often, however, "error card" is used in a more limited sense, meaning only those cards where variant versions exist.

One example of "variations" happened in the 1959 and 1960 Topps baseball sets. Certain cards were printed on two different types of card stock; one produced a white back, and the other a darker gray. The photographs and information on the cards themselves were not in error. The result was that said cards occur in two variations, based on the back color.

In hobby usage, the term "error card" is sometimes applied broadly to include a range of unintended variations, though not all such differences are considered true errors by manufacturers or cataloging authorities. Distinctions are often made between printing or factual errors (such as incorrect player information or misspellings) and production variations, such as differences in card stock, coloration, or print runs, which may not involve incorrect content. Standard hobby references and checklists typically differentiate between these categories when documenting card variations.

== 1950 Bowmans ==
The Bowman cards of the 1950s contain two notable errors. The first was not technically an error, but nonetheless resulted in an anomaly in the 1954 Bowman set. The set featured Ted Williams as card number 66. Shortly after the set was released, Williams signed an exclusive contract with Topps, Bowman's primary competitor. Topps featured Williams as the first and last cards in their set that year. Now barred from using Williams's picture and name, Bowman substituted Williams' teammate Jimmy Piersall as card number 66 in all subsequent printings, duplicating the front and back of Piersall's other card in the series, number 210.

The next year, in their last set before selling out to Topps, Bowman "flipped" the backs of two pairs of cards. Brothers Milt Bolling of the Red Sox and Frank Bolling of the Tigers and pitchers Don Johnson of the Orioles and Ernie Johnson of the Braves were originally issued with their counterparts' card backs. Bowman corrected the error and issued cards with the correct backs.

== 1950s Topps ==
In its 1956 set, Topps issued six team cards, the Cubs, Reds, Orioles, Indians, Braves and Phillies, in three different versions. The different cards are commonly referred to by collectors as the "dated", "undated" and "centered" cards. The first release showed a team picture, obviously taken the year before and correctly labeled as "1955 Chicago Cubs, "1955 Cincinnati Reds" and so on. For some reason, perhaps because it was confusing to have a card labeled "1955" in a 1956 set, Topps reprinted these cards, blacking out the space where the date had appeared. This resulted in the team name being off-center in the black box where it appeared. Topps finally issued a third version of all six cards with the team name centered in the box.

Topps's 1957 set contained Yankee great Mickey Mantle as card number 95. The card is known among collectors as the "ghost Mantle". Topps editors had long been expert at altering pictures to meet their needs. For example, the same photo of future major league manager Bob Kennedy appears in the 1954, '55 and '56 Topps sets. But the photo is airbrushed to show Kennedy in an Indians cap in '54, an Orioles cap in '55 and, finally, a White Sox cap in '56. The '57 Mantle card shows a posed shot of the switch hitting center fielder finishing a left-handed swing. The original photo apparently contained someone standing behind Mantle as he swung. When the card was assembled, the intruder was "blacked out", leaving a perfect silhouette, a "ghost", in back of the Mick. The outline is far more prominent and clear in some copies of the card than it is on others, inspiring debate among collectors as to whether Topps issued a corrected version, with the interloper better camouflaged.

In the 1957 Topps set, card number 20, of Henry Aaron, features a classic example of a "flipped negative". The photo on the card shows Aaron, a right-handed slugger, batting left-handed. A closer look at the number on Aaron's uniform, 44, shows that he was not playing a practical joke on the photographer. The number is backwards, the result of the photo negative being printed upside down. Topps never issued a corrected version.

In the 1959 Topps set, Aaron's Braves teammate Lew Burdette fooled the Topps photographer. Burdette joined with Warren Spahn to form the heart of a pitching staff that would carry the Braves to two consecutive World Series. The front of his 1959 Topps card, number 440, shows Burdette, a right-handed pitcher, with a glove on his right hand at the top of a left-handed windup. Topps got revenge on Burdette, however, when they printed his name on the card. Burdette's middle name, "Lewis" is shortened to "Lou", rather than "Lew". The year before Topps had taken no chances, identifying him as "Lou" on the front of card number 10, and "Lew" on the back.

== Printing errors ==
The Topps 1962 baseball set saw the 'grandaddy' of all error situations. The set's entire second series (the 87 cards numbered 110 through 196) was first printed and distributed without the proper amount of ink for the photographs; the result has been known ever since as the "Green Tint" series, for the sky and dirt in the backgrounds of some cards are decidedly green, rather than blue or brown. All the photos were somewhat out of focus, and card number 159 (Yankees Pitcher Hal Reniff) was incorrectly numbered as 139.

The entire series was re-printed and re-distributed, with the photo inks in proper proportion and with eight photos replaced with different poses (Reniff's among them). All remaining photos were re-cropped for the re-printing (e.g., some photos were moved a bit to one side, and others moved up or down), thus giving every card in the series an error card. The Reniff card's number was still incorrect in this second printing, so a third, corrected one of his was produced, resulting in one 'true' Reniff card and 2 errors (each error card with a different photograph).

The "wrongback" error occurs when the sheet is mated with a back which is upside down or reversed. Most wrongbacks have the backs off center. It is possible to find a centered back and off center front.

The blankback or blankfront error is a type of error where the back or front of the card is blank. Most likely however, these are first run proofs from the company not intended for distribution. In addition, misspelled words/names, print blotches, missing border sections, and different colored backgrounds (like the 1973 manager cards) are all considered errors although relatively few of these are corrected.

== Washington Nat'l League - 1974 ==
The 1974 "Washington Nat'l League" cards are considered errors too, but were corrected during the run. This came about when there was a strong possibility that the San Diego Padres might move to Washington after the 1973 season. Anticipating that possibility, Topps substituted the term "Washington Nat'l League" onto early-series Padres' cards, since the nickname of the potentially re-located team was not known.

== 1989 Billy Ripken card ==
Billy Ripken is also remembered for an infamous baseball card. In 1989, Ripken's Fleer card showed the player holding a bat with the expletive fuck face written in plain view on the knob of the bat. Fleer subsequently rushed to correct the error, and in their haste, released versions in which the text was scrawled over with a marker, whited out with correction fluid, and also airbrushed. On the final, corrected version, Fleer obscured the offensive words with a black box (this was the version included in all factory sets). Both the original card and many of the corrected versions have become collector's items as a result. There are at least ten different variations of this card. As of February 2009 the white out version has a book value of $120.

Years later, Ripken admitted to having written the expletive on the bat; however, he claimed he did it to distinguish it as a batting practice bat, and did not intend to use it for the card.

== 1990 Pro Set Football ==
The 1990 Pro Set American football card release has several errors and variations. Due to a contractual dispute, the Pro Bowl card of Eric Dickerson (No. 338) was withdrawn early creating a short print. Card #338 would be reissued with Ludwell Denny on the front and it was a promotional card not available in packs.

Card #75 in the set was meant to be Browns Center Cody Risen but the card was withdrawn early, resulting in a short print. Another variation from 1990 Pro Set is card #204, featuring Fred Marion of the New England Patriots. This card is rather controversial as it features San Francisco 49ers player John Taylor in the background and the belt from Taylor's pants are undone. The positioning of the belt gives the appearance that his private area is exposed but it is just a shadow and the belt.

Other errors and variations in the 1990 Pro Set football set include:

Athlete	Error	Description	Correction	Description
Barry Sanders	1a	No ROY trophy on back	1b	Shows picture of Barry holding the ROY trophy
Joe Montana	2a	Back reads "Kelly-3,521 yards"	2b	back corrected to "Kelly: 3,130 yards"
Walter Stanley	15a	#8 on back	15b	#86 on back
Chris Doleman	18a	error back, wrong stats, "Townsent"	18b	back corrected to 104.5 sacks for Taylor; "Townsent" corrected to "Townsend"
Andre Ware	19a	no draft stripe on front	19b	draft stripe on front
Mo Elewonibi	20a	no draft stripe on front	20b	draft stripe on front
Percy Snow	21a	no draft stripe on front	21b	draft stripe on front
Anthony Thompson	22a	no draft stripe on front	22b	draft stripe on front
Franco Harris	25a	wrong birthdate	25b	corrected birthdate 3/7/50
Jack Lambert	27a	wrong birthdate	27b	corrected birthdate 7/8/52
Mike Ditka	59a	SMALL FONT for "Hall Of Fame" on front	59b	LARGE FONT for "Hall Of Fame" on front
Rickey Dixon	63a	no bio notes under photo	63b	bio notes under photo
Sam Wyche	68a	no bio notes under photo	68b	bio notes under photo
Ozzie Newsome	75a	wrong hometown	75b	corrected hometown: Muscle Shoals, AL
Johnny Holland	110a	no name, number on back	110b	corrected
Perry Kemp	111a	Ken Stills photo on back	111b	corrected
Sterling Sharpe	114a	says he was born in Glenville	114b	corrected birthplace: Chicago, IL
Andre Rison	134a	NO TRADE STRIPE	134b	WITH TRADE STRIPE
Mervyn Fernandez	152a	Draft status incorrect	152b	status corrected to "Drafted 10th round '83"
Art Shell	161a	Birthdate: 11/25/46 on back	161b	Birthdate: 11/26/46 on back, large HOF print in banner on front
Fred Marion	204a	49ers player with belt	204b	49ers players belt airbrushed out
Morten Andersen	210a	name in white on back	210b	corrected (name in black)
Eric Martin	216a	name in white on back	216b	corrected (name in black)
Jim Mora	221a	name in white on back	221b	corrected (name in black)
Charles Haley	289a	incorrect fumble recovery stats	289b	stats corrected to 5 total fumble recoveries
Ray Perkins	319a	no name or position on back	319b	corrected
Chris Hinton	343a	no stripe	343b	with traded stripe
Randall Cunningham	386a	Small Print On Front	386b	Large Print On Front
Dan Hampton	449a	DE on back	449b	DT on back
Kevin Glover	496a	C-G back	496b	G back
Wes Hopkins	607a	Stat Categories Fumbles and Interceptions in Black	607b	Stat Categories Fumbles and Interceptions in RED
Rod Woodson	626a	Red fumble interceptions header	626b	Black fumble interceptions header
Rod Bernstine	627a	position listed as TE	627b	position corrected to RB
Anthony Miller	630a	position listed as WR on the back	630b	position listed as WR-KR on the back
Leslie O'Neal	632a	position listed as LB-DE on front	632b	position listed as LB on front

card number 140 Jim Everett front John alt back
