= Pro Set trading cards =

American trading card company

Pro Set
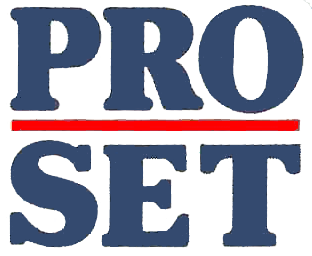
- Company type: Private
- Industry: Collectibles
- Founded: 1988
- Founder: Ludwell Denny
- Successor: Brian Gray, Leaf CEO
- Headquarters: Dallas, United States
- Products: Trading cards
- Number of employees: 200 (1991)

Pro Set was a Dallas-based trading card company founded by Ludwell Denny in 1988. Denny had gained a card license that year after making and selling other NFL memorabilia in previous years. His licensing agreement with NFL Properties allowed Denny to gain access to its extensive photo library and become the first card maker officially associated with a professional sports league. Across the bottom of most of his company's cards was its designation as "The Official NFL Card", a distinction it held through 1991.

During its years in the business, Pro Set acquired licenses from several sports associations including the NFL, NHL, NASCAR and PGA Tour to produce trading cards.

In February 2021, Leaf Trading Cards CEO Brian Gray announced that the company had assumed control of the Pro Set trademark and of its intention to resurrect the brand.

== History ==
The first year that Pro Set released a product was 1989. The year marked the beginning of the modern era for pro American Football Cards. Score (who had entered the market the year before with baseball) also released a football product. For several years, Pro Set flooded the market with its product. The company managed to produce football sets through 1993. In 1994, Pro Set folded due to Chapter 7 bankruptcy, citing more than $800,000 in unpaid royalties to the NFL Players Association.

Pro Set made rookie cards of actual rookies (notably draft picks) and offered more color and action shots than Topps did. Pro Set claimed to have its own printing presses for its product, which could make and issue cards very quickly. For its first football card set in 1989, Pro Set released its cards in three series. The 1989 rookies were found primarily in the second series. Key rookies in the set included Troy Aikman, Barry Sanders, Derrick Thomas, and Deion Sanders. The 100 card Series II set was sold in packs, but the packs averaged 11 Series I cards and 4 Series II cards per pack. These cards not only featured first round picks but featured later round picks. These cards were labelled as Pro Set Prospects.

At its peak, Pro Set had a 44,000-square-foot (4,100 m^{2}) headquarters, where 225 employees designed various cards. In 1992, Pro Set forecasted sales of $165 million. A free magazine was published by Pro Set called the Pro Set Gazette. It was mailed to 1.2 million collectors twice a year. Beckett Publications noted that in 1991, sports cards grossed about $1.9 billion in sales in North America, so Pro Set had a dramatic impact, albeit briefly.

== Insert cards ==
=== Football ===
There were a number of inserts in 1989 Pro Set football, including a 30 card subset of broadcasters. There were also Super Bowl insert cards for each game that had been played. There was also a card for NFL Commissioner Pete Rozelle. Pro Set introduced an insert card for Santa Claus that was labelled as a coach card. The first year it was released was in 1989 and it was a dealer premium. It was inserted in packs in 1990 and 1991. The Santa Claus cards included Pro Set founder Ludwell Denny somewhere in the card. On the back of each Santa card is a parody of the poem "The Night Before Christmas" that has sportscard subject matter. Pro Set included other insert cards in its 1990 offering, such as Payne Stewart, a comic book character called Super Pro, which was a superhero in a football uniform, a tribute to the late Joe Robbie, and the Lombardi Trophy Hologram card.

== Error cards ==
=== Football ===
The 1990 Pro Set football card release has several errors and variations. Due to a contractual dispute, and his unwillingness to join the NFLPA, the Pro Bowl card of Eric Dickerson (No. 338) was withdrawn early creating a short print. Card #338 would be reissued with Ludwell Denny on the front and it was a promotional card not available in packs. Card #75 in the set was meant to be Browns Center Cody Risien, but the card was withdrawn early due to his retirement during training camp, also resulting in a short print. The most sought after variation from 1990 Pro Set is card #204 Fred Marion of the New England Patriots. This card is rather controversial because the card features San Francisco 49ers player John Taylor in the background and the belt from Taylor's pants came undone. The positioning of the belt gives the appearance that his private area is exposed, but it is just a shadow and the belt.

- Other error cards and variations in the 1990 Pro Set football set include:

Athlete	Error	Description	Correction	Description
Barry Sanders	1a	No ROY trophy on back	1b	Shows picture of Barry holding the ROY trophy
Joe Montana	2a	back reads "Kelly-3,521 yards"	2b	back corrected to "Kelly: 3,130 yards"
Walter Stanley	15a	#8 on back	15b	#86 on back
Chris Doleman	18a	error back, wrong stats, "Townsent"	18b	back corrected to 104.5 sacks for Taylor; "Townsent" corrected to "Townsend"
Andre Ware	19a	no draft stripe on front	19b	draft stripe on front
Mo Elewonibi	20a	no draft stripe on front	20b	draft stripe on front
Percy Snow	21a	no draft stripe on front	21b	draft stripe on front
Anthony Thompson	22a	no draft stripe on front	22b	draft stripe on front
Franco Harris	25a	wrong birthdate	25b	corrected birthdate 3/7/50
Jack Lambert	27a	wrong birthdate	27b	corrected birthdate 7/8/52
Mike Ditka	59a	SMALL FONT for "Hall Of Fame" on front	59b	LARGE FONT for "Hall Of Fame" on front
Rickey Dixon	63a	no bio notes under photo	63b	bio notes under photo
Sam Wyche	68a	no bio notes under photo	68b	bio notes under photo
Ozzie Newsome	75a	wrong hometown	75b	corrected hometown: Muscle Shoals, AL
Johnny Holland	110a	no name, number on back	110b	corrected
Perry Kemp	111a	Ken Stills photo on back	111b	corrected
Sterling Sharpe	114a	says he was born in Glenville	114b	corrected birthplace: Chicago, IL
Andre Rison	134a	NO TRADE STRIPE	134b	WITH TRADE STRIPE
Mervyn Fernandez	152a	Draft status incorrect	152b	status corrected to "Drafted 10th round '83"
Art Shell	161a	Birthdate: 11/25/46 on back	161b	Birthdate: 11/26/46 on back, large HOF print in banner on front
Fred Marion	204a	49ers player with belt	204b	49ers players belt airbrushed out
Morten Andersen	210a	name in white on back	210b	corrected (name in black)
Eric Martin	216a	name in white on back	216b	corrected (name in black)
Jim Mora	221a	name in white on back	221b	corrected (name in black)
Charles Haley	289a	incorrect fumble recovery stats	289b	stats corrected to 5 total fumble recoveries
Ray Perkins	319a	no name or position on back	319b	corrected
Chris Hinton	343a	no stripe	343b	with traded stripe
Randall Cunningham	386a	Small Print On Front	386b	Large Print On Front
Dan Hampton	449a	DE on back	449b	DT on back
Kevin Glover	496a	C-G back	496b	G back
Wes Hopkins	607a	Stat Categories Fumbles and Interceptions in Black	607b	Stat Categories Fumbles and Interceptions in RED
Rod Woodson	626a	Red fumble interceptions header	626b	Black fumble interceptions header
Rod Bernstine	627a	position listed as TE	627b	position corrected to RB
Anthony Miller	630a	position listed as WR on the back	630b	position listed as WR-KR on the back
Leslie O'Neal	632a	position listed as LB-DE on front	632b	position listed as LB on front
David Richards	633a	position listed as G-T on back	633b	position listed as G on back
Curt Jarvis	657a	no "Official NFL card" on front	657b	"Official NFL card" added to front
Terry Wooden	698a	back number 90	698b	back number 51
Pat Terrell	718a	back number 41	718b	back number 37
Oliver Barnett	723a	position listed as DT on front	723b	position listed as NT on front
Johnny Bailey	743a	Back says 46	743b	Back says 22
Eric Moore	744a	no prospect stripe	744b	prospect stripe added
Dexter Manley	772a	mentions substance abuse problems on the back of the card	772b	does not mention substance abuse on back
Commissioner at Berlin Wall	785a	back says "peered through the Berlin Wall"	785b	"posed at the Berlin Wall"

Various cards in the 1990 offering have three variations. They are as follows:

- Card 15: Walter Stanley, the number on the back of the card is 87.
- Card 134: Andre Rison, traded stripe on front, message Are You Missing Something is on the back
- Card 161: Art Shell, the birthdate of 11/26/46 is on the back, small HOF print in banner on front
- There were multiple Team Draft Day varieties of Jeff George. He was featured in his Illinois Fightin’ Illini uniform. One version had the Patriots logo on the front of the card. Another version was randomly inserted in packs of Series 1 football, and featured the card, but with the Indianapolis Colts logo.

=== Hockey ===
==== 1990-91 Pro Set Hockey ====
Card Number	Athlete	Error	Corrected
1	Ray Bourque	Misspelled name on card front, shows as Borque	Yes
6	Dave Christian	Stats incorrect: 28 games with Washington and 50 with Boston	No
7	Garry Galley	Text on back: "on the shelf" changed to "injured"	Yes
9	Rejean Lemelin	Wrong headings for goalie & 89-90 stats are for Andy Moog	No
10	Andy Moog	89-90 stats are for Rejean Lemelin, was 3rd in Vezina voting, card shows 2nd	No
13	Dave Poulin	Flyers stats missing from 89-90	No
17	Dave Andreychuk	Photo on back is Scott Arniel	Yes
18	Scott Arniel	Photo on back is Dave Andreychuk	Yes
21	Phil Housley	Trade to Winnipeg tag is missing	Yes
25	Clint Malarchuk	Back in action 11 days and not 2 as stated on card	No
27	Daren Puppa	number 27 on back of card and 31 on the front.	No
35	Al MacInnis	Misspelled Allan on card back	No
39	Brad McCrimmon	Number 39 on card front, instead of 4	Yes
42	Joe Nieuwendyk	Misspelled Niewendyk on card front	Yes
44	Paul Ranheim	LW on front and C on back	No
48	Rick Wamsley	Misspelled Rich in bio on card back	No
51	Dirk Graham	Word sparking misspelled on card back	No
53	Steve Larmer	Position and sweater number in white and should be black	Yes
54	Dave Manson	Both photos actually Steve Konroyd	Yes
57	Troy Murray	Position and sweater number in white and should be black	Yes
59	Denis Savard	No traded stripe, Played 70 games in 86-87	Yes
60	Al Secord	Alan on card back changed to Al	Yes
61	Duane Sutter	Wrong Position, missing Retired tag	Yes
63	Doug Wilson	Position and sweater number in white and should be black	Yes
70	Bernie Federko	Says only player from Foam Lake	No
83	Martin Gelinas	Back photo is Joe Murphy	No
84	Adam Graves	Stats missing 89-90 Detroit info	No
85	Charlie Huddy	French language card, no accent in 1st e in Defenseur	No
86	Petr Klima	Card back says born in Chomulov and should be Chomutov	No
96	Steve Smith	French language card, no accent in 1st e in Defenseur	No
99	Dave Babych	Extra space included after Forum	No
100	Yvon Corriveau	Washington and Hartford games not separate	No
114	Brian Benning	St Louis and LA stats not separate	No
117	Tony Granato	Plays RW and not C	No
121	Mike Kushelnyski	No position and number on card front	Yes
122	Bob Kudelski	Born in Springfield and not Feeding Hills	No
127	Tomas Sandstrom	89-90 stats not printed	No
129	John Tonelli	Misspelled Tonnelli on card front	Yes
130	Brian Bellows	Back photo actually Dave Gagner, Front LW and back RW	Image Corrected but position remains uncorrected
131	Aaron Broten	New Jersey and Minnesota stats not separate	No
136	Ulf Dahlen	Rangers and Minnesota stats not separate	No
146	Guy Carbonneau	Sept Isles listed as Sep Isles	No
153	Claude Lemieux	Reason is misspelled as reson	No
167	Slava Fetisov	Misspelled Vlacheslav on front	Yes
169	Alexei Kasatonov	Stats should indicate either Soviet or NHL	No
175	Peter Stastny	Front photo is actually Patrik Sundstrom	Yes
176	Patrik Sundstrom	Front photo is actually Peter Stastny	Yes
183	Glen Healy	Misspelled Glenn on card back	No
188	Hubie McDonough	Kings and Islanders stats not separate	No
189	Jeff Norton	Born Cambridge, Mass. not Acton	No
196	Mike Gartner	Minnesota and Rangers stats not separate	No
198	Miloslav Horava	Misspelled Miroslav on card front	Yes
204	Bernie Nicholls	Kings and Rangers stats not separate	No
208	Darren Turcotte	GP total says 97 and should be 96	No
209	John Vanbiesbrouck	Front C and back G	No
213	Vincent Rideneau	Wrong photo (Steve Larmer) on front	No
219	Ken Linseman	Bruins and Flyers stats not separate	No
222	Kjell Samuelsson	Born 10/18/58 not 10/18/56	No
228	Phil Bourque	Misspelled Borque on both sides	Yes
229	Rob Brown	Front RW, back C; actual position LW	No
230	Alain Chevrier	Chicago and Pittsburgh stats not separate	No
236	Mario Lemieux	Missed 21 games not 11	No
240	Kevin Stevens	Front LW, back C	No
242	Zarley Zalapski	Pittsburgh misspelled as Pittsburg	No
244	Lucien DeBlois	Front C and back RW; misspelled Deblois in bio on back	No
245	Marc Fortier	Misspelled Mark front and back	Yes
248	Tony Hrkac	Blues and Nordiques stats not separate	No
254	Tony McKegney	Red Wings and Nordiques stats not separate	No
257	Joe Sakic	Front 88 and back 19	No
260	Jeff Brown	Nordiques and Blues stats not separate	No
261	Gino Cavallini	on back, Meagher is misspelled as Meager	No
272	Rich Sutter	Canucks and Blues stats not separate	No
275	Allan Bester	Misspelled Alan on card front	Yes
290	Gilles Thibaudeau	Islanders and Leafs stats not separate	No
300	Jyrki Lumme	89-90 Canadiens and Canucks stats not separate	No
301	Andrew McBain	Photo on back is Jim Sandlak	Yes
303	Dan Quinn	Penguins and Canucks stats not separate	No
316	Mike Liut	Capitals and Whalers stats not separate	No
322	John Tucker	89-90 Buffalo Sabres team affiliation and stats missing 8 games	No
330	Dale Hawerchuk	No traded stripe	Yes
335	Fredrik Olausson	Misspelled Frederik on both sides	Yes
335	Fredrik Olausson	Misspelled Fred on front	Yes
348	Jari Kurri, All Star Card	Missing Italy tag on front	Yes
356	Thomas Steen, All Star Card	Both Front and back picture Doug Smail	No
377	Bob Murdoch, Adams Trophy card	One tie in 1989-90 should be 11 ties	NO
378	Brett Hull	Byng Trophy, Should be Lady Byng Memorial Trophy	No
383	Gord Kluzak	Masterton Trophy - Should be Bill Masterton Memorial Trophy	No
385	Len Ceglarski, Lester Patrick Trophy card	Missing number on back	Yes
395	Brett Hull (League Leader)	Born 8/9/64 not 9/9/64	No
400	Darren Turcotte (League Leader)	Front RW, back C	No
421	Jiri Hrdina	Calgary logo on front should be Pittsburgh	No
428	Jacques Cloutier	White position and number on front, not black	No
430	Michel Goulet	White position and number on front, not black	No
465	Neil Wilkinson	Uniform number on front is 5; should be 35	No
466	JJ Daigneault	Front Jean Jacques and back JJ	No
470	Todd Ewen	Photo on back actually Eric Desjardins	Yes
556	Peter Zezel	Card says number 25 and sweater shows 9	No
593	Stephane Matteau RC	Front RW and back LW	No
596	Ken Sabourin	Front LW and back D; actual position is C	No
613	Mike Craig	Wearing 50 and card says 20	No
614	JC Bergeron	Front JC and back Jean Claude	No
632	Jaromir Jagr RC	Stat header on back is not aligned properly	Yes
668	Bob Gainey	Stats and bio are Bob McCammon's	No
676	Brian Sutter	Coaching totals say 0-69-21 and should be 70-69-21	No
678	Bob McCammon	Stats and bio are Bob Gainey's	No
703	Wayne Gretzky's 2000th Point	2.33 goals per game should be 2.33 points per game	No

==== 1991-92 Pro Set Hockey ====
Card Number	Athlete	Error	Corrected
15	Pierre Turgeon	Born 8/29 not 8/28	No
17	Benoit Hogue	Stats show two seasons with Winnipeg and should say Buffalo	No
88	Paul Cyr	Stats show New York, should say NY Rangers	No
159	Brian Leetch	Career points total shown as 329 should be 229	No
165	Brian Mullen	Transaction says drafted by San Jose and was actually traded	No
168	Kelly Kisio	Transaction says drafted by Minnesota, was actually traded to San Jose	No
219	Adam Oates	Stats are off-line from top to bottom	No
225	Wendel Clark	Connecticut not capitalized in last line	No
239	Robert Kron	Type in stat box is smaller than others	No
319	Pittsburgh Penguins Cup Champs	Fourth line says won in 5 games and should say 6 games	No
328	Neil Wilkinson	Born Manitoba not Minnesota	No
531	Nicklas Lidstrom	Misspelled Niklas on front	No
603	Kirk McLean League Leaders	Leader logo shows PPG and should be GAA	No

==== 1991-92 Pro Set Platinum ====
Card Number	Athlete	Error	Corrected
166	Michel Goulet	Wrong photo on front	No
197	Craig Billington	Front photo actually Chris Terreri	No
252	Dominik Hasek	Misprinted Pro Set logo on reverse	Yes

== Of note ==
- After the launch of football, Pro Set issued a 100-card PGA Tour set in 1990. The set included members of the Senior Tour and was issued as a complete set. This was the first time that Pro Set issued complete sets.
- Pro Set offered cards in various languages. In 1991, Pro Set featured football cards in Spanish, hockey cards in French and soccer cards in British English.
- Ludwell Denny was trying to syndicate a television show called "Profiles", an entertainment newsmagazine for memorabilia collectors. The show had a trial run in Dallas-Fort Worth and other parts of Texas.
- As part of their 1991 Series I set, Pro Set issued a card of the 1990 Heisman Trophy winner, Brigham Young University quarterback Ty Detmer. However, Detmer had won the Trophy during his junior year and returned to BYU for his senior year in 1991. This created a mild controversy as it was one of the first times an active NCAA player was featured in a card set of professional athletes.
- In 1991, Pro Set issued a card of Notre Dame star Raghib Ismail, despite the fact that he signed with the Canadian Football League's Toronto Argonauts. 1991 Pro Set's NFL Series I featured Ismail on card number 36, honoring him as the Walter Camp Player of the Year.
- In 1992, Pro Set created a 100-card set based on the Guinness Book of World Records. Each card was 3½x2½ inches. The cards were available in Canada, the United States, Australia, South Africa and Great Britain.The first card featured Cosmoclock 21 at Yokohama, Japan. Card 100 showed Mike Powell at the 1991 World Athletics Championships in Tokyo. Cards 1-43 were classified as "Facts and Feats", while cards 44-84 are "Natural & Human World", and cards 85-100 are "Sports & Games".
- After disappearing in the 1960s, the Parkhurst hockey card brand was resurrected in 1991 by Brian H. Price and licensed to Pro Set. Following the popularity of hockey cards in 1990–91, Parkhurst cards were back in the marketplace. Pro Set promoted Parkhurst as a premium brand of cards. Series I and Series II were available in both English and French and featured the rookie cards of players including Dominik Hašek and John LeClair. The 1991–92 Update Set was the final release of the year and was the most valuable of all three sets. Another key rookie card of that set was of Bill Guerin.

When Pro Set, Inc. entered Chapter 11 bankruptcy protection prior to the 1992–93 NHL season, Price traveled weekly from Toronto to Dallas and became the unofficial hockey brand manager. The second year of Parkhurst (1992–93) was the final one with Pro Set as the company went bankrupt and Price took his Parkhurst tradename and license to the Upper Deck Company, an agreement which began with the 1993–94 season.

- In August 1992, Pro Set replaced its founder Ludwell Denny at the insistence of its lenders. Denny was replaced with a San Francisco-based turnaround expert. Robert J. McLaughlin became Pro Set's chief executive officer, with the task of resolving the obligations to its lenders, licensors and trade creditors.
- In December 1994, the National Football League asked Federal authorities to investigate investments made by two former NFL Properties presidents due to their affiliation with Pro Set. The NFL's special properties committee appointed by Commissioner Paul Tagliabue and the properties executive committee requested the investigation into Pro Set. The United States Attorney for the Southern District of New York was assigned to handle the investigation.

The allegations were based on investments made by former NFL Properties presidents, John Flood, (who was dismissed in March 1994), and his predecessor, John Bello, who quit in September 1993. Neither Flood nor Bello told the league they had set up companies to invest in Pro-Set Press, a printer partly owned by the Pro Set trading card company.

== List of products ==
Products launched by Pro Set included:

- Desert Storm Pro Set (1991)
- Bill & Ted's Most Atypical Movie Cards (1991)
- Guinness World Records cards (1992)
- NASCAR Pro Set Legends (1992)
- NFL Football (1989)
- NFL Football (1990)
- NFL Football (1991)
- NFL Football Spanish (1991)
- NFL Football (1992)
- NHL Hockey Series 1 (1990–91)
- NHL Hockey Series 2 (1990–91)
- NHL Hockey Series 1 (1991–92)
- NHL Hockey Series 1 French (1991–92)
- NHL Hockey Series 2 (1991–92)
- NHL Hockey Series 2 French (1991–92)
- NHL Hockey (1992–93)
- Pro Set NHRA (1991)
- Pro Set NHRA (1992)
- Parkhurst Hockey Series 1 (1991–92)
- Parkhurst Hockey Series 1 French (1991–92)
- Parkhurst Hockey Series 2 (1991–92)
- Parkhurst Hockey Series 2 French (1991–92)
- Parkhurst Hockey Update (1991–92)
- Parkhurst Hockey (1992–93)
- Parkhurst Hockey Update (1992–93)
- PGA Tour (1990)
- Pro Set Platinum Football Series 1 (1991)
- Pro Set Platinum Football Series 2 (1992)
- Pro Set Platinum Hockey Series 1 (1991–92)
- Pro Set Platinum Hockey Series 2 (1991–92)
- Pro Set Power Football (1992)
- Pro Set Puck Candy (1991-92)
- Pro Set Soccer (featuring English and Scottish soccer players) (1990-91)
- Pro Set Soccer (featuring English and Scottish soccer players) (1991-92)
- Pro Set SuperStars MusiCards (1991)
- The Little Mermaid (1991)
- World League of American Football (1991)
- Pro Set Yo! MTV Raps (1991)
