= In the Game Trading Cards =

American sports card manufacturing company

In The Game (ITG)
- Type: Private
- Industry: Collectibles
- Founded: 1998
- Founder: Brian H. Price
- Defunct: 2014; 12 years ago
- Fate: Company defunct, brand name acquired by Leaf
- Successor: Leaf
- Brands: Be A Player

In The Game (ITG) was a sports card manufacturing company founded by Brian H. Price in 1998 with its head office in the United States and an office in Canada. The company mainly produced ice hockey trading cards. In 2014 the rights to use the "In The Game" name was transferred to Leaf Trading Cards in Dallas, Texas.

== History ==
In The Game's first entrance into the trading card market came in the 1998–99 season, when they produced the "Be A Player" brand trading cards in partnership with the NHL Player's Association (NHLPA). Be A Player featured one certified autograph card per pack. Since then, In The Game expanded its production to include other sets.

In 1998, Price was asked by Ted Saskin of the NHLPA to determine what should be done with the NHLPA's Be A Player hockey product. The product was started in 1994 and was supposed to give to each of the NHLPA licensees for two years. Pinnacle Brands had the license for 1996 and 1997 but they went bankrupt and Be A Player needed a home. Price was hired by the NHLPA as a consultant to determine the fate of Be A Player. He advised Saskin that the Upper Deck Company should be given back the Be A Player brand because of collector loyalty. However, Saskin asked Price if he would come back into the hockey card market and manufacture Be A Player in partnership with the NHLPA. Price agreed and In The Game, Inc. was founded.

In 2005, in conjunction with the 2004–05 NHL lockout, the NHLPA terminated its license agreement with In The Game. Trying to prove to the NHLPA executive committee that he could leave the position of Licensing Director and take the position Executive Director, Ted Saskin gave Upper Deck a five year exclusive license to produce hockey cards and In The Game's NHLPA License was over. The company continued to produce trading card sets featuring active and retired NHL players and minor/junior hockey players. After the 2005-06 season, In The Game obtained a license to produce cards featuring players and logos under the umbrella of Hockey Canada. During the 2006-07 season, ITG produced the International Ice Signature Series along with boxed sets commemorating gold medal wins by the Canada Women's National Ice Hockey Team and Canada Men's National Junior Ice Hockey Team. However, ITG lost their American Hockey League licensing to Upper Deck in June 2014.

In 2010, ITG also made a brief foray into baseball cards, releasing one set featuring top prospects before running into further licensing issues.

In 2014, the assets owned by the company and its "In The Game" trade name were sold to Leaf Trading Cards in Dallas, Texas.
