= Monsterwax =

American trading card company

- Industry: Entertainment
- Founded: 1992; 34 years ago
- Headquarters: Tallahassee, United States
- Products: Trading card
- Website: monsterwax.com

Monsterwax is an American trading card company that specializes in science fiction and horror themes. It was established in 1992, making it the oldest American card company still in business exclusively producing non-sports trading card sets. Many trading card companies like Topps are corporate subsidiaries that primarily produce sports-related issues. However, Monsterwax is a small privately owned company focusing primarily on non-licensed entertainment cards. They usually release only one to three series a year. Monsterwax generally limits their print runs to less than 500 boxes (a fraction of the industry standard) and numbers each box and checklist.

== History ==
Monsterwax is best known for making retro style art cards similar to the ones produced during the golden age of non-sports cards (the 1940s – 1960s). They typically feature nostalgic wrappers, dramatic stories, and original artwork. The topics can be esoteric. Their first series, Tune In for Terror, profiled the popular horror programs from radio’s golden era. The Art of H.G. Wells (from 2005) connected The Time Machine, The Island of Dr. Moreau, and The War of the Worlds together into one unbroken narrative. Don’t Let It Happen Here (2003) was a homage to Horrors of War, Fight the Red Menace, and other jingoistic hyper-patriotic card sets from the past. Like its classic predecessors, Don’t Let It Happen Here garnered a certain amount of publicity for showing graphic acts of violence while presenting informative news events from around the world.

Monsterwax promo card to the War Of The Worlds series, released in 2005

Most Monsterwax products are designed by Kurt Kuersteiner (writer and company founder) and painted by a featured artist (often Ricardo Garijo of Commando Comics fame, as well as his son, Ricardo Jr., after his father's death in 2009). Other accomplished artists who were showcased with solo sets include Ron Gross and Obelix Hell Art (of Spain).

Monsterwax card series typically incorporate a sophisticated storyline and often include numerous extras to create a "more immersive card experience". The Lovecraft cards, for example, included burial certificates, Miskatonic University diplomas, and toe tags from the morgue. The Monsters & Maniacs series had various relics taken from the company's annual haunted attraction before it was torn down (then rebuilt elsewhere). It also had sealed envelopes with evidence collected from the narrative's crime scene (like broken finger nails or snake skin). The card packs themselves were each sealed with actual law enforcement "Evidence" tape.

Monsterwax is often critical of aggressive industry practices. Their "Monsterwax Manifesto" criticizes the typical chase card ratios that force customers to buy several cases to finish a master set. They claim that the practice alienates collectors and hurts the hobby. Although Monsterwax produces chase cards, they usually include a complete set of them in every box, which is not the industry norm. They also speak out against dumping of old products and often mock the “speculative attitude” of sports card collectors. Many of their advertisements are illustrated parodies of 1960s public service or comic book ads and commonly mock the sports card hobby.

Monsterwax occasionally uses the trademark Mystery Playhouse on their test products, which was the original name of the haunted attraction that they produce every Halloween (since 1999) near their headquarters in Tallahassee, Florida. The company financed event has since grown into a full-scale haunted attraction and was renamed the Terror of Tallahassee in 2003. The haunt was also used as the backdrop to the 2004 Night Slasher card set, which was a spoof of the TV series Kolchak: The Night Stalker.

== Published sets ==
- Tune In for Terror (1992)
- Don’t Let It Happen Here (2003)
- The Night Slasher (2004)
- War of the Worlds (2005)
- The Time Machine (2006)
- Island of Dr. Moreau (2006)
- Monsterfaces (2007)
- Urban Legends (2009)
- Shock Stories (2009)
- Journey to the Center of the Earth (2011)
- 20,000 Leagues Under the Sea (2011)
- Spook Show (2011)
- Legendary H. P. Lovecraft (2013)
- Monsters & Maniacs (2014)
- Dinosaur Galaxy (2015)
- Legendary Lovecraft Series 2 (2018)
- Monsters from Hell (2019)
- Lost In Space- The Art of Ron Gross (2019)
- Horrible Ugly Monsters (2020)
- Spook Show 2 (2020)
- Terrors of War (2024)
- Lost In Space (Series 2) The Initial Adventures (2025)
- Creatures of the Cosmos (2025)
