= Leaf Trading Cards =

Sports card manufacturer

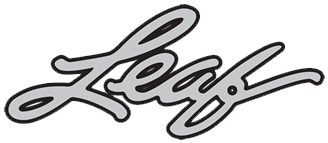
- Type: Private
- Industry: Lithography, Collectibles
- Founded: 2010; 16 years ago
- Founder: Brian Gray
- Headquarters: Dallas, USA
- Area served: Worldwide
- Key people: CJ Breen (director of marketing and licensing)
- Products: trading cards
- Website: leaftradingcards.com

Leaf Trading Cards, founded in 2010, is a private company based in Dallas, Texas, that produces trading cards and sports collectibles. Though it bears the same name, it is not directly connected to either Leaf International (which briefly printed trading cards between the 1940s and 1950s) or the former Leaf brand, owned by Donruss, which produced baseball cards from the 1980s until about 1993.

== History ==
The company was established in 2010 after Brian Gray purchased the rights to the Leaf brand name and rebranded his existing memorabilia company, Razor Entertainment, which he founded in 2005, as "Leaf Trading Cards". The company's director of marketing and licensing is former college baseball player CJ Breen. Gray served as CEO of Leaf until 2023.

Leaf does not maintain broad licensing deals with large sporting organizations and instead focuses largely on niche sporting markets, such as pickleball and special releases with specific players, including college and highly touted high school athletes. A specific example are cards of National Football League (NFL) draft picks each spring. Leaf also produces and markets professional wrestling cards.

In 2022, Leaf filed a lawsuit against NFL player CeeDee Lamb for failing to fulfill obligations under a contract to provide the company with a certain quantity of autographed playing cards. As a result, Lamb was forced to sign enough autographs to fulfill his contract.

In 2025, the company signed a deal to produce a series of trading cards for the UnderArmour Next All-American game a deal with Rivals, a company that provides recruiting data for football and basketball players, to produce a series of high school prospects cards using the Rivals rating system, scouting reports and data. In June, Leaf also produced a series of horse racing cards for the National Thoroughbred League (NTL). The card set featured 100 cards (10 celebrity owners, 10 trainers, 10 jockeys, and 70 horses) and debuted at an event on June 5 in Saratoga Springs, New York. In July, Leaf signed a licensing deal with the Major League Baseball Players Association (MLBPA) to produce minor league trading cards beginning that summer. In September 2025, Leaf announced a new baseball product, Baseball Nation, which would feature cards with prospect autographs and a handful of retired MLB legends. In November, Leaf debuted a multi-sport series of metal cards featuring the Sports Illustrated for Kids brand. The first five-card set features top-ranked pickleball player Anna Leigh Waters and college football stars Jeremiyah Love, Fernando Mendoza, Diego Pavia, and Bryce Underwood.

For 2026, new releases from Leaf would include Paydirt Football, Optichrome Baseball, and Glory of the Game Basketball cards. Returning releases would include Trinity Football and Baseball, Metal Football and Baseball, and Leaf Pop Century cards. This year's Pop Century cards, which came in Leaf Metal chromium style and the Leaf Pearl premium style, featured a variety of clebrities and pop culture icons for the first time: Aaron Paul, Ann-Margret, Bryan Cranston, Johnny Depp, Henry Cavill, John Goodman, Mr. T, Nicolas Cage, Timothy Olyphant, Winona Ryder, and Julia Stile.

In May 2026, the NFL Players Association (NFLPA) sued Leaf for false endorsement and misappropriating players’ publicity for allegedly "us[ing] multiple active NFL players in its products without authorization". In September 2026, the parties reached an agreement and the four-month-old lawsuit was settled.

== Types of Leaf cards ==
There are several types or categories of Leaf Trading Cards collections:

- Leaf Metal Authentics: These cards feature an emphasis on on-card autographs.
- Leaf Metal Pop Century: These cards feature celebrities from film, television, pop culture, etc.
- Leaf Multi-Sport: These cards bring together athletes from various sports, along with celebrities. Limited dual-signed inscription cards and multi-signed cards are available.
- Leaf Optichrome: These cards include current rookies and stars, as well as retired legends from baseball, basketball, and football.
- Leaf Photographic: Released in 2025, this collection featured iconic celebrities (actors, athletes, musicians, and others), many of whom are deceased. Each card came with a hand-signed Polaroid built into it.
- Leaf Red Carpet Collection: In 2025, Leaf produced 200 boxes of this premium, invitation-only release featuring autographs from Hollywood stars.
- Sports Illustrated for Kids: Leaf’s deal with Sports Illustrated for Kids runs through 2026. Leaf has plans for 100 or more athletes to appear, with a preference toward athletes who have not had an SI for Kids card before.
