= Basketball card =

Type of trading card related to basketball

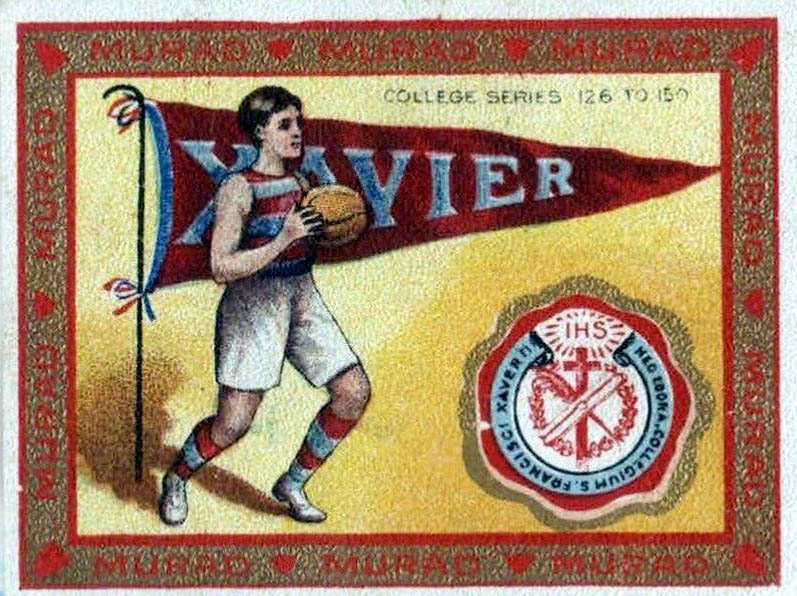
- One of the first basketball cards issued in 1910 by Murad Cigarettes, featuring Xavier College
- Company: Panini; Topps; Upper Deck; Leaf
- Country: United States
- Availability: 1910–present
- Features: Basketball

A basketball card is a type of trading card relating to basketball, usually printed on cardboard, silk, or plastic. These cards feature one or more players of the National Basketball Association, National Collegiate Athletic Association, Olympic basketball, Women's National Basketball Association, Women's Professional Basketball League, or some other basketball related theme.

Some notable producing companies include Panini Group (present days), Bowman Gum and Topps (in early days).

== History ==
The first basketball cards were produced in 1910, in a series cataloged as "College Athlete Felts B-33". The complete series included ten different sports, with only 30-cards being associated with basketball. The cards were issued as a cigarette redemption premium by The number of packages needed to redeem for the tobacco cards is not known.

The next series of basketball cards were issued in 1911, in two separate series, "T6 College Series", measuring approximately 6" by 8", and "T51 College Series", measuring approximately 2" by 3". These series included a variety of sports, with only 6-cards being associated with basketball. One card from the T6 series, and five cards from the T51 series. Both series were produced in two variations; one variation reading "College Series", the other, "2nd Series". The cards were acquired in trade for fifteen Murad cigarette coupons. The offer expired June 30, 1911.

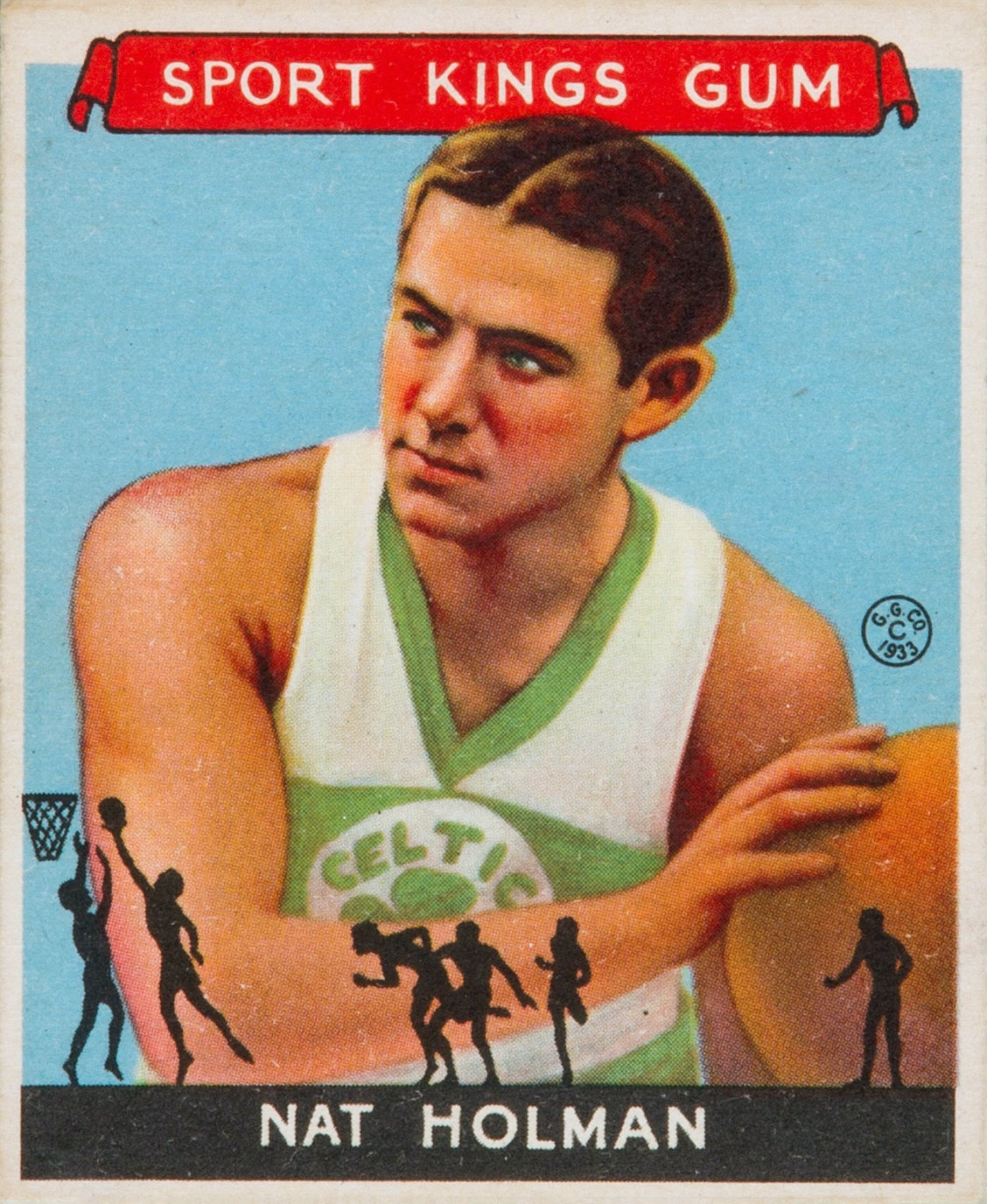
Nat Holman on a Goudey card of 1933

Basketball cards were not seen again until 1932, when C.A. Briggs Chocolate issued a 31-card set containing multiple sports. In exchange for a completed set of cards, Briggs offered baseball equipment.

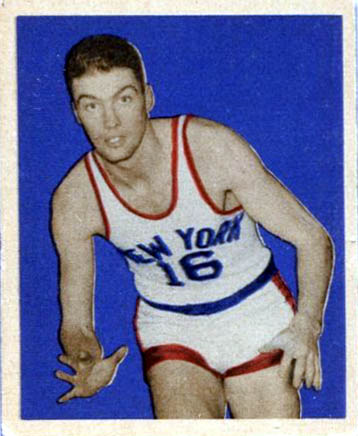
Bud Palmer depicted on the 1948 Bowman basketball set

Bowman Gum produced the first NBA cards, starting in 1948, releasing a 72-piece set that included the George Mikan rookie card. Another U.S. company, Topps, began to manufacture cards during the 1958, returning to production in 1969–70. Fleer had its peak in 1961-62, returning in 1986–87, to resurrect the basketball card industry by releasing a 132-card NBA officially licensed set which included the rookie cards of NBA Hall of Famers Michael Jordan, Patrick Ewing, Clyde Drexler, Joe Dumars, Chris Mullin, Hakeem Olajuwon, Isiah Thomas, Dominique Wilkins, Karl Malone and Charles Barkley as well as an additional 11 card sticker set. This set is seen by many basketball card collectors as the "1952 Topps of basketball." In the 1990s/2000s, several companies produced basketball cards, including Topps, Hoops, Skybox, Fleer, and Upper Deck. In 2009, the NBA licensed the rights to manufacture and commercialize basketball cards to Italian Panini Group, which became the only licensor for the league and players. Panini has been NBA licensee since then.

2020-21 Panini Flawless Triple Logoman featuring LeBron James was sold for 2.4 million.
