= Upper deck =

Upper deck may refer to:

- Upper Deck Company, an American trading card business
- Upper deck, the highest level internal deck on a ship
- The second (or higher) tier (deck) of seating in a sports stadium
