= Frank H. Fleer =

American confectioner (1860–1921)

Frank Henry Fleer
- Born: July 9, 1860; Germany
- Died: November 1, 1921 (aged 61); Thomasville, North Carolina, U.S.
- Resting place: West Laurel Hill Cemetery, Bala Cynwyd, Pennsylvania, U.S.
- Occupations: Confectioner, chewing gum manufacturer
- Known for: Founder of Fleer
- Notable work: Dubble Bubble

Frank Henry Fleer (July 9, 1860 – November 1, 1921) was a German-born American confectioner and businessman who, along with his brother Robert, co-founded the Fleer Corporation in 1885 and co-invented Chiclets candy covered chewing gum. He patented the first bubble gum, Blibber-Blubber in 1906, but it was never sold in market as it was too sticky and brittle. After his death, his formulation of bubble gum was modified by Walter Diemer and became the successful Dubble Bubble brand.

== Early life ==
Fleer was born in Germany and emigrated to the United States in the 1880s.

== Career ==
Frank and his brother Robert founded the Fleer Corporation in 1885 and invented one of their early successes, Chiclets, candy coated chewing gum. They sold their invention to the American Chicle Company in 1914.

In 1906, Fleer patented an original formulation of bubble gum, called Blibber-Blubber, but it never reached the market as it was too sticky and brittle. Fleer registered trademarks for several other brands of gum including Blimp, Fruit Hearts, Vi-lets, and Whiz Bangs, although all turned out to be failures.

Fleer died on October 31, 1921, of a stroke at his country estate in Thomasville, North Carolina. He was interred at West Laurel Hill Cemetery in Bala Cynwyd, Pennsylvania.

In 1928, Walter Diemer, an accountant in Fleer's company, refined the formulation of Blibber-Blubber and it was marketed by Fleer's company as Dubble Bubble.

Fleer's company also went on to be innovators in the baseball card business, adding trading cards in 1923.

== Personal life ==
Fleer was married twice. His second wife was Willie Jenkins. He was survived by two daughters.
