= SkyBox International =

American trading card company

SkyBox International Inc.
- Formerly: Impel Marketing (1990–92)
- Type: Public
- Industry: Collectable
- Founded: 1990
- Defunct: 1995; 31 years ago
- Fate: Acquired by Marvel Entertainment Group in 1995, which merged it with Fleer to form "Fleer/SkyBox International"
- Successor: Fleer/SkyBox International (1995–2005)
- Headquarters: Durham, North Carolina, US
- Products: Trading cards milk caps, CD-Roms
- Brands: SkyBox; SkyCaps
- Owner: (Brand name); Upper Deck (2005–present)
- Parent: Brooke Groups, Inc. (1989–1992); public (1993–1995); Marvel Entertainment Group (1995–2005)

SkyBox International Inc., formerly Impel Marketing, was an American manufacturing company based in Durham, North Carolina started in 1990 and operated until 1995. SkyBox produced trading cards, milk caps, and CD-Roms collectibles.

Rights to the SkyBox brand have been owned by Upper Deck since 2005.

== History ==
=== Impel Marketing ===
In 1990, The Liggett Group Inc., a U.S. tobacco company, announced it would change its name to Brooke Group Ltd. and split into two subsidiaries, Liggett Group Inc. and Impel Marketing Inc. Liggett covered the tobacco business, while Impel covered its non-tobacco activities. At the time of the announcement, the company had small businesses in collectible football and basketball cards as well as confectionery products, both of which used the same distribution channels as cigarettes. Impel was to be headquartered in Durham, North Carolina and was expected to broaden the scope of the company's sports and entertainment business.

=== SkyBox ===
Impel Marketing changed its name to SkyBox International Inc. in April 1992. That same year, the company appointed Magic Johnson as its spokesperson. In June 1993, SkyBox started making milk caps under the name SkyCaps beginning with DC SkyCaps. Later that year, Brooke Group, Inc. spun SkyBox off as a NASDAQ traded public company.

On March 10, 1995, Marvel Entertainment, a comic book publisher and maker of Fleer baseball and hockey cards, announced a purchase of SkyBox for $150 million which was completed two months later in May. Marvel merged SkyBox and Fleer as Fleer/SkyBox International and The company headquarters were moved from Downtown Durham, NC to Mount Laurel, NJ. The company was later sold to Alex Grass and his son, Roger Grass in February 1999.

In 2005, rights to the SkyBox brand were acquired by Upper Deck Company in an auction of key assets of Fleer/SkyBox International.

== Products ==
SkyBox produced many licensed non-sports trading cards, including sets for Disney (1995), Star Trek (since 1993) and Marvel Comics (2010). SkyBox also produced SkyCaps, its milk caps games brand. Cap series included DC Comics characters, Jurassic Park, Batman: Knightfall, and a National Football League series.

One of the first card companies on the Internet, SkyBox branched into multimedia, producing CD-ROM collectibles and games. With Skyborg: Into the Vortex, the company stated, "SkyBox is well-known for its marketing and technological innovations, of which this first-ever interactive, multimedia card line, which is also SkyBox's first CD-ROM product, is only the most recent example."
