= Bowman (brand) =

American bubble gum and trading card manufacturer

Bowman Gum Company
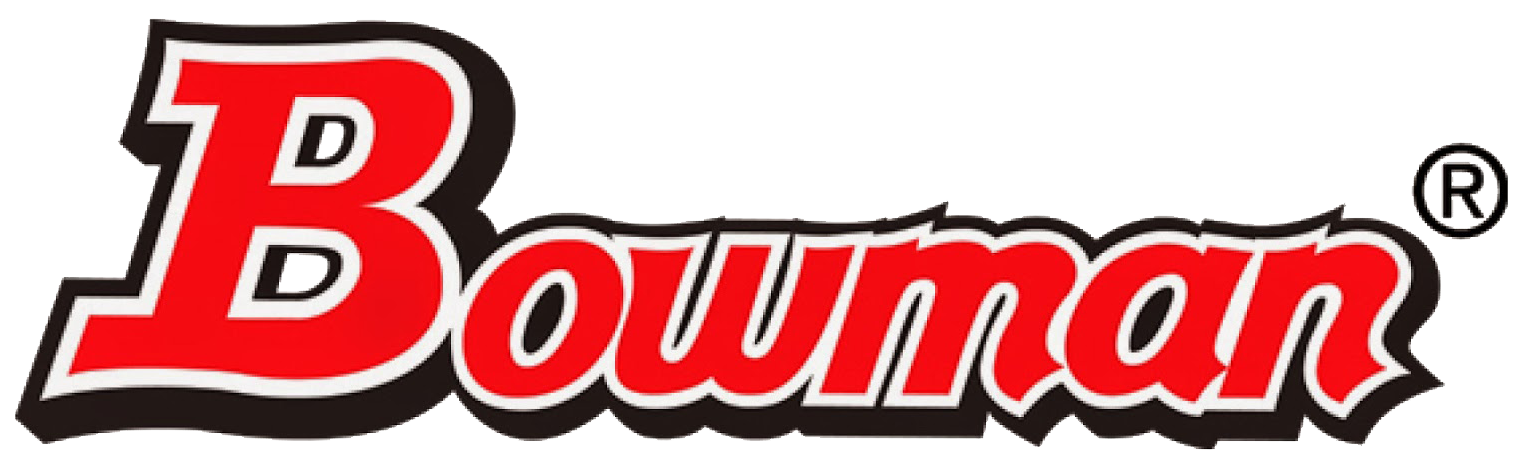
- Trade name: Bowman Gum
- Industry: Candy, collectibles
- Founded: 1927
- Founder: Jacob W. Bowman
- Defunct: 1956; 70 years ago
- Fate: Acquired by Topps in 1956
- Headquarters: Philadelphia, Pennsylvania, United States
- Products: Bubble gum Trading cards

Bowman is a brand of trading cards owned by Topps.

The Bowman Gum Company was a Philadelphia-based manufacturer of bubble gum and trading cards. It was founded by Jacob Warren Bowman in 1927.

Bowman produced a line of baseball cards, which were highly popular in the 1940s. Bowman also produced American football, basketball, and hockey cards. The company was acquired by Topps in 1956, and the brand was discontinued.

Topps resurrected the "Bowman" brand in 1989.

== History ==
Jacob Warren Bowman, an American chewing gum salesman, started his own company, Gum, Inc. in Philadelphia in 1927. Gum, Inc. started producing Blony bubble gum which immediately became the top selling penny bubble gum in the United States in 1929.

The Blony trademark was registered by Bowman on January 13, 1931 (filed June 30, 1930). In 1937, Blony had 60 percent of the sales of bubble gum sold in the U.S., largely due to the fact that, weighing 210 grains, it was the largest piece of bubble gum sold for a penny. With the advertisement "Three Big BITES for a penny", Blony made Gum, Inc. "the biggest firm in the U. S. catering exclusively to the penny gum trade" according to a 1937 Time magazine article. By then, Gum, Inc. occupied five floors and the basement of a building on Woodland Avenue in Philadelphia.

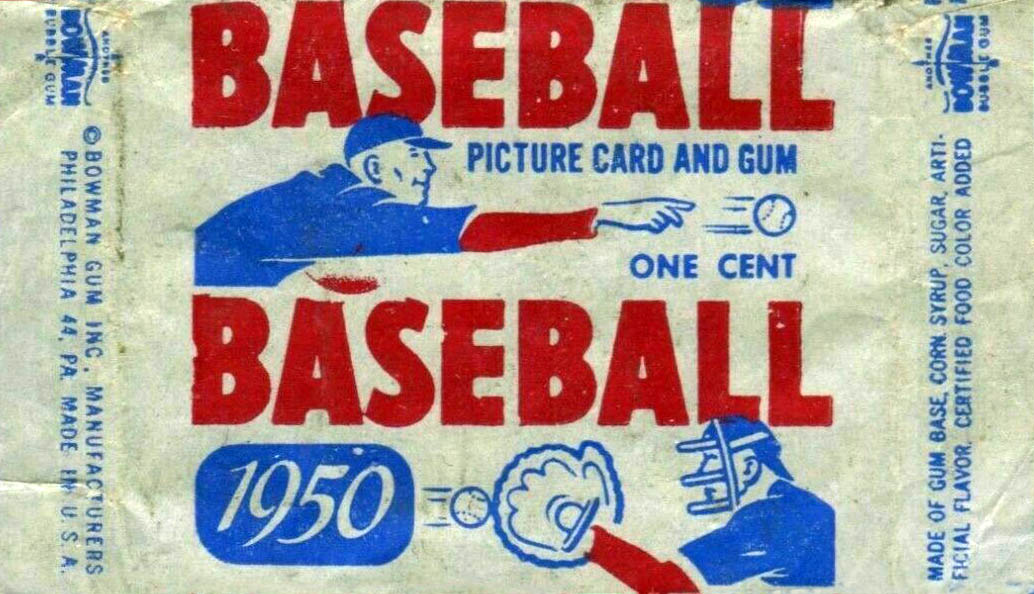
A 1950 Bowman chewing gum wrapper with baseball cards inside

Blony gum came with color trading cards on various topics. A non-sports example, the 1938 series, Horrors of War featured 288 cards detailing various contemporary conflicts. The motto "To know the HORRORS OF WAR is to want PEACE" appeared on each card, but children nicknamed the series "War Gum".

Franklin V. Canning became a partner with Bowman in 1930. Canning, a New York druggist who supplied the pink bubble gum base material to Gum, Inc., also provided working capital in return for 250 shares, half of the company stock. A subsidiary of the Wrigley Company developed a better gum base in 1932, which sold for less than Canning's base. President Bowman demanded that Canning reduce the price of the gum base, which resulted in altercations between the two, and ended in Bowman being ousted from the company in 1936.

In July 1937, Bowman returned to the company after a long, bitter legal battle which ended in the Pennsylvania State Supreme Court upholding his reinstatement as president of the company. Gum, Inc. had earnings of $49,000 on sales estimated at $800,000 in the first six months of 1937. In September 1937, Bowman's estranged second wife, Ruth, filed a suit against Bowman for part ownership of Gum, Inc., claiming a verbal agreement to a half-interest in his holdings.

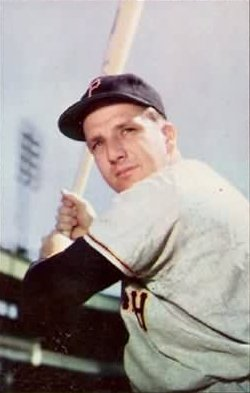
A 1953 Bowman color baseball card of Ralph Kiner

Bowman expanded its business when the company started to produce trading cards in the 1930s. The first releases by Bowman were non-sports topics, but the company soon entered to the sports market with its baseball cards of 1939. The company produced a series of cards known as the "Play Ball" sets each year from 1939 to 1941. Production halted after the United States as wartime paper rations were enacted and the company did not return to making trading cards until 1948, then under the Bowman name.

After the World War II Bowman emerged with its 1948 baseball card set, which became highly popular. That same year, Bowman also released its first American football card set of 108 cards, and its first basketball cards set.

By then, Bowman was competing against Leaf Candy Company, which left the marketplace in 1950; that year Bowman sales of baseball cards alone was $1 million. For a few years, Bowman was the leading producer of baseball cards, but was soon overtaken by rival company Topps Chewing Gum. Bowman produced baseball cards until 1955.

After a period in which the two fought to sign players to exclusive contracts for their cards, Topps bought out Bowman in 1956 for $200,000. ($2,281,276.12 in 2023 dollars)

In 1989, the Bowman brand name was resurrected by Topps to use on some of its subsidiary sports card sets. In recent years, the Bowman company has become known as the top brand for rookie cards.

== Modern sports trading cards ==
Bowman (brand)
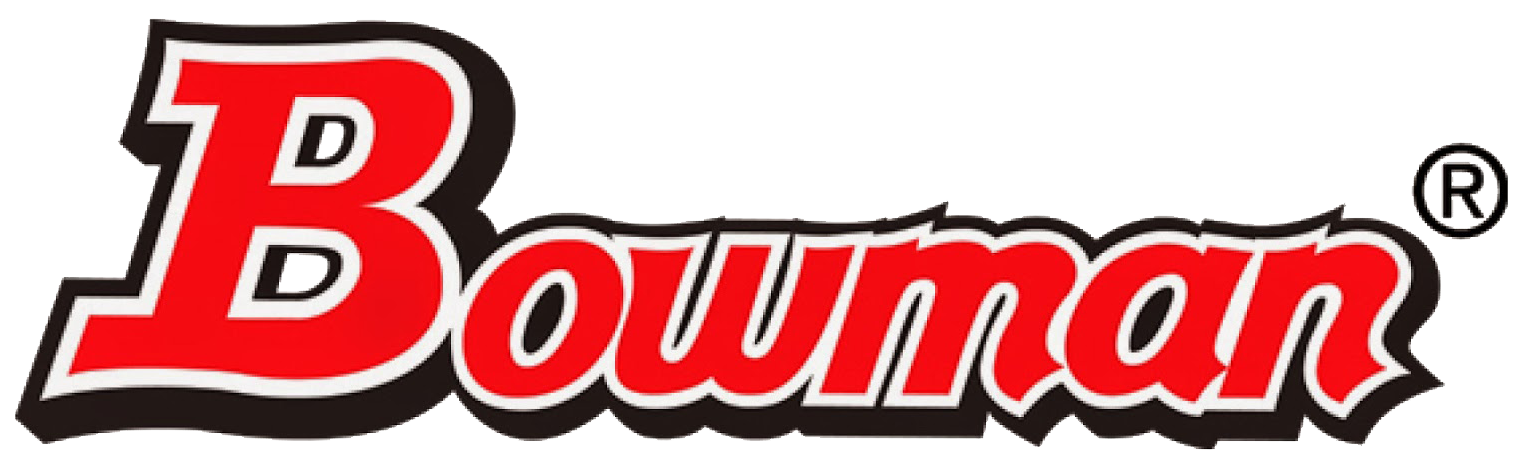
- Product type: Collectibles
- Current owner: Topps
- Country: United States
- Introduced: 1989; 37 years ago
- Previous owners: Bowman Gum Company
- Website: topps.com/bowman

=== Bowman Chrome ===
Another popular trading card set produced by Bowman is the Chrome set. After the success of the Chrome set by Topps, Topps created a Bowman Chrome set in 1997. This was initially fueled by rookie cards of José Cruz Jr. and Travis Lee, but top rookie cards from the set now are of Roy Halladay, Miguel Tejada, Eric Chavez, Kerry Wood, and Lance Berkman. The set continued to be a mainstay, and got a major jump in 2001 following the inclusion of autographed cards. One of the rookies that autographed cards for Bowman Chrome in 2001 was St. Louis Cardinals star Albert Pujols. This card continues to skyrocket in value, worth about $2,500 not graded. In 2002, autographed cards of Major League Baseball (MLB) rising stars such as David Wright of the New York Mets, Joe Mauer of the Minnesota Twins and Bobby Jenks of the Chicago White Sox were inserted into the set.

=== Bowman Draft Picks and Prospects ===
Bowman also creates a set called Bowman Draft Picks and Prospects. This set is like regular Bowman, but shows cards of MLB Draft Picks, participating players from the MLB All-Star Futures Game and MLB rookies that have had previous issues (veteran cards). Usually relic cards featuring swatches from jerseys of All-Star Futures Game players, other memorabilia cards and non-rookie autographs called Signs Of The Future. Bowman "Draft" also has two chrome cards per pack, and the chrome subset has autographed rookie cards and all the parallels from regular bowman chrome.

Many stars have had rookie cards in Bowman Draft Picks. 2002 Bowman Draft has rookie cards of Florida Marlins prospect Jeremy Hermida, Oakland Athletics outfielder Nick Swisher, Atlanta Braves outfielder Jeff Francoeur, Tampa Bay Devil Rays shortstop B.J. Upton, San Diego Padres shortstop Khalil Greene and Florida Marlins pitcher Dontrelle Willis. 2003 Bowman Draft Picks has rookie cards of Boston Red Sox pitcher Jonathan Papelbon, New York Yankees second baseman Robinson Canó, Philadelphia Phillies first baseman Ryan Howard, Milwaukee Brewers second baseman Rickie Weeks, Tampa Bay Devil Rays outfielder Delmon Young and Los Angeles Angels shortstop prospect Brandon Wood. This set also includes Grady Sizemore, Mark Buehrle, Ichiro, Chase Utley, J J Hardy, Huston Street, Dontrelle Willis, Josh Johnson, Jay Bruce, Jorge Cantu, Albert Pujols, and Jose Reyes.

=== AFLAC Redemption Set ===
Making its debut in 2004, was Bowman's idea of redemption cards for a set of cards from the AFLAC High School All American game. Players included were Cameron Maybin, Andrew McCutchen, Chris Volstad, C. J. Henry, and Justin Upton. The sets were delayed and not shipped until 2006, and the Gold Refractor cards - originally intended to be 50 redemption sets - "accidentally" had over 50 redemption cards slip into packs, which caused them to be delayed even more. Topps sent out a letter asking customers if they wanted a three-card auto set consisting of C. J. Henry, Andrew McCutchen, and Cameron Maybin. (Justin Upton was later added as a fourth person in the set) or the Gold Refractor set. The Gold Refractor set was shipped before the Auto Set. Here are the final print runs (Base and Base Chrome sets not numbered)

2004 Bowman Draft Picks and Prospects AFLAC Chrome Parallel and Auto Set Print Runs

- 2004 AFLAC Bowman Chrome Refractor Set (#'d to 500) – 315 in circulation
- 2004 AFLAC Bowman Chrome X-Fractor Set (#'d to 125) – 107 in circulation
- 2004 AFLAC Bowman Chrome Gold Refractor Set (#'d to 50) – 34 in circulation
- 2004 AFLAC Bowman Chrome Autograph Set (#'d to 125) – 90 in circulation

=== Bowman's Best ===
Bowman's Best started in 1994 and was the first Bowman product to have refractors. 1994 Bowman's Best key rookie cards were Jorge Posada, Billy Wagner, and Édgar Rentería. Next years Bowman's Best would be one of the best Bowman sets ever. It had rookie cards of Vladimir Guerrero, Bobby Abreu, Andruw Jones, Hideo Nomo and Scott Rolen. The 1997 Bowman's Best set gave something new to the Bowman's Best brand that would stay with the Bowman's Best brand for a while. This set had rookie cards of Miguel Tejada, Kerry Wood and Roy Halladay, and the refractor parallels, but this time they had inserted autographed cards. Tony Gwynn and Derek Jeter were among the signers in this set, and there were refractor and atomic refractor parallels of the autographed cards. In 1999, Bowman's Best had autographed cards with two autographs on one card. In 2002, Bowman's Best had autographed and memorabilia rookie cards inside the base set.

=== Bowman Sterling ===
Bowman Sterling was introduced in 2004. It was a higher end and probably Bowman’s top of the line offering to date. This set was an immediate hit. Collectors enjoyed the offerings of the set along with the refractor parallels. The base set is made up of rookie cards, veteran game-used cards, autographed game-used cards featuring a jersey swatch from the players jersey alongside an autograph and autographed rookie cards. This set was released again in 2005 and was a hit again. Regular refractor cards are limited to 199 copies and are in regular packs. Black refractors (limited to 25 copies), red refractors (limited to 1 copy) and buyback cards (purchased by Topps and signed by players before returned to packs), are inserted into the box loader packs. Box Loader packs are one per box and encased in a special Topps holder.

=== Bowman Heritage ===
Bowman Heritage is a set that puts today's players on the design of early Bowman cards. These cards have autographed inserts called Signs of Greatness and game used jersey/bat relic cards called Pieces of Greatness.

=== Bowman Football ===
Bowman football 2026 launched September 30th, 2026. For the first time, 2026 Bowman Football incorporates NFL players and also collegiate stars. The most standout cards to collectors in this set include players like Arch Manning, Bo Jackson, and Fernando Mendoza along with veterans and football legends. The set includes a 200 card base set. Some cards have sold for thousands of dollars. These are mostly super short print cards or "SSP". Some of these include the Garbage Pail kids SSP cards, Crystallized Chrome numbered cards, and Anime versions of players SSP cards.
