= Blibber-Blubber =

First bubble gum formulation

- Blibber blubber gum label
- Product type: Bubble gum
- Produced by: Frank H. Fleer
- Country: United States
- Introduced: 1906
- Discontinued: (never marketed)
- Markets: U.S.

Blibber-Blubber was the first bubble gum formulation, developed in 1906 by American confectioner Frank H. Fleer. The gum was brittle and sticky, with it containing little cohesion; for these reasons, the gum was never marketed. It also required vigorous rubbing with a solvent to remove from the face after the bubble had burst.

== Subsequent developments ==
In 1928, after a number of unsuccessful tests using various formulas, Walter Diemer, an accountant at the Frank H. Fleer Company, improved the Blibber-Blubber formulation by adding latex. As stated in a 1996 Lancaster Intelligencer Journal interview by Mr. Diemer, the results of one experiment that would lead to the common chewing gum today were completely accidental. The result was the first commercially successful bubble gum brand, Dubble Bubble. Diemer colored his creation pink because it was the only food coloring he had at the time. The pink color became associated with bubble gum and was adopted by nearly all subsequent bubble gum manufacturers. The improvement in physical properties due to latex's introduction facilitated significant growth in the bubble gum market, which is nowadays produced by many different brands and in a diverse range of colors and flavors around the world.

== See also ==
- 1906 in the United States
- List of chewing gum brands
