= Richard McWilliam =

American businessman (1953–2013)

- Born: October 20, 1953
- Died: January 5, 2013 (aged 59)
- Occupation: Entrepreneur
- Years active: 1989–2013
- Known for: Co-founder and chairman of Upper Deck Company

Richard P. McWilliam (October 20, 1953 – January 5, 2013) was the chairman and co-founder of Upper Deck Company, a successful and award-winning Carlsbad-based collectibles business that specializes in trading cards for Major League Baseball, National Basketball Association, National Hockey League, National Football League and Major League Soccer.

Besides Upper Deck, McWilliam had another business, JetSource, of which he was founder and chief executive officer (CEO). JetSource was voted one of the top 40 fixed-base operations for jetsetters in America among the thousands of such airport rest stops for fuel, private hangars, and other services.

== Education and early career ==
Richard McWilliam received Bachelor's degrees in accounting and economics from California State University at Fullerton. He then practiced as a certified public accountant for 11 years.

== Upper Deck ==
In 1991, McWilliam was named one of America's top entrepreneurs on Inc. Magazine's "Entrepreneur of the Year" list.

In 1993, he controlled Upper Deck with a 27% stake, and was the only original partner still active in company management.

In 1998, Beckett Baseball named McWilliam one of the "most influential people in baseball".

In May 2005, McWilliam was honored at the sports collectible industry's annual trade convention in Hawaii as the industry's "most influential" person of the past 20 years. In addition to McWilliam's award, Upper Deck was also recognized for the debut of its legendary 1989 Baseball trading card set designed and produced by Robert Young Pelton. Author Pete Williams' book Card Sharks covers the rise and fall of Upper Deck and McWilliam's ousting of the founders and designer who built the company from a start up to $260 million in annual sales in the first three years. McWilliam's decision to counterfeit error cards is also documented in the book. In 2010, a New York Post article detailed McWilliam's role in the scandal.

We try to make the perfect cards, from color separation to the packaging ... cards that people will want to keep forever.

— McWilliam in an interview in 1990.

== Personal ==
McWilliam had a wife named Vivianne, and they have three children. An enthusiastic fisherman, he was a financial supporter of the trout-stocking program in Bishop, California, supporting programs at Rady Children's Hospital in San Diego, and programs for military veterans. McWilliam died at the age of 59 in Rancho Santa Fe, California on January 5, 2013, due to alcohol poisoning. He had a history of heart problems, including open heart surgery in 2008.
