= Alex Grass =

American businessman and lawyer

- Born: Alexander Grass; August 3, 1927; Scranton, Pennsylvania
- Died: August 27, 2009 (aged 82); Harrisburg, Pennsylvania
- Occupations: Businessman, lawyer, philanthropist
- Known for: Founding of the Rite Aid drugstore chain

Alexander Grass (August 3, 1927 – August 27, 2009) was an American businessman, lawyer, and philanthropist who founded Rite Aid, one of the United States' largest drugstore chains.

== Early life ==
Grass was born in Scranton, Pennsylvania, to Jewish parents, Louis and Rose Grass. His father, a businessman whom Grass described in 2002 as "relatively successful", died during the Great Depression when Grass was 9 years old in 1938, leaving the family with little income. Grass' family relocated from Scranton to Miami Beach, Florida in 1936 after his father's death. Grass worked a number of small jobs while living in Florida. He obtained a law degree from the University of Florida Law School in 1949 using the G.I. Bill.

== Business career ==
=== Early career ===
Grass returned to Pennsylvania in 1951 to pursue a legal career in tax law with the Internal Revenue Service and other government agencies. He took a position for the state in the Bureau of Corporation of Tax in Harrisburg. While working there, he took the bar exam and passed on his first try. His father-in-law had a wholesale food business, Louis Lehrman and Sons, with his brother-in-law Lewis Lehrman in 1951. The business sold coffee and sugar during World War II. In 1958, Grass went into the rack-jobbing business to supply health and beauty aids and non-food to grocery customers.

Grass saw several opportunities for retail in the 1960s. While working for the distribution company, Grass noticed that there seemed to be a lack of competitively priced health and beauty stores in Pennsylvania. Following changes in pricing regulations in the 1960s, manufacturers could not dictate minimum prices for retailers.

=== Rite Aid ===
Grass identified an opportunity in the retail sector, thanks to the Supreme Court ruling and lack of competing drugstores. He decided to open a store in downtown Scranton, which he called the Thrif D Discount Center, in 1962. The store would be the first of the chain which would become Rite Aid. The first store in Scranton saw early success. He expanded the business and opened other locations in Wilkes-Barre, Hazleton and Lancaster, as well as a second location in Scranton.

By 1968, the company, which had more than 50 stores at the time, had changed its name to Rite Aid. Rite Aid's initial public offering was $25 a share on the New York Stock Exchange. Rite Aid purchased a rival chain, the Daw Drug Company, which was based in Rochester, New York, in 1969, which doubled the company's size and gave Rite Aid a pharmacy business for the first time.

By the middle of the 1990s, Grass had grown Rite Aid drugstores into an important regional pharmacy chain. Grass retired as the company's chairman and chief executive in March 1995. That year, Rite Aid had the most stores of any drugstore in the country and was the nation's number two drugstore in terms of revenue.

Grass' son, Martin Grass, took over the company from his father in 1995. Rite Aid declined as a chain and a brand as Martin Grass sought to expand the company. Martin Grass was fired by the company in 1999, after he was implicated in an $1.6 billion accounting scandal that nearly destroyed Rite Aid, just four years after his father had retired. Alongside other Rite Aid executives, Martin Grass was convicted of overstating Rite Aid's earnings during the 1990s and sentenced to eight years in federal prison.

== Later life ==
Alex Grass became involved in philanthropy and other business interests following his departure from Rite Aid. He served as the head of the Hebrew University of Jerusalem board of governors, where he was awarded the National Scopus Award. He served as the longtime director of the National Association of Chain Drug Stores.

In 1999, Grass and his son, Roger Grass, purchased the Fleer/SkyBox sports trading card company. The company closed and was sold in 2005. Grass donated $1.5 million to establish the Alex Grass School of Business Leadership at Harrisburg Area Community College. The PinnacleHealth's (now called UPMC Central PA) Harrisburg Hospital named a $14.5 million building after Grass, who was one of its benefactors. Grass donated $1.5 million to the University of Florida to establish chair for its center for Jewish Studies and construct a new law school building.

== Personal life and death ==
Alex Grass met his wife, Lois Lehrman, while in Florida and the couple married six months later. They later divorced. His second wife, Louise, died in 2007. Grass had four children, 2 sons and 2 daughters, with his first wife.

Grass died at his home in Harrisburg, Pennsylvania, on August 27, 2009, ten-years after his initial diagnosis with lung cancer. Grass' funeral was held at Temple Ohev Sholom in Harrisburg. He was buried in Mount Moriah Cemetery in Lower Paxton Township, Pennsylvania.
