= Skyborg: Into the Vortex =

1995 video game

- Cover art by Gerald Brom
- Developer: Fringe Multimedia
- Publisher: SkyBox International
- Designer: Fringe Multimedia
- Platforms: Mac OS, Microsoft Windows
- Release: NA: November 15, 1995
- Genre: Graphic adventure
- Mode: Single player

Skyborg: Into the Vortex was a CD-ROM science fiction computer game released in 1995 by the trading card company SkyBox International and developed by the American studio Fringe Multimedia.

== Gameplay and plot ==
Skyborg: Into the Vortex was based on Creators Edition Master Series, a set of trading cards by various artists created especially for the game, which were released simultaneously with the game. Each copy of the game came with a random pack of the cards. Card artists included Dave Dorman, Julie Bell (wife of Boris Vallejo), Brom, Brian Stelfreeze, Simon Bisley, and Dave McKean. Some cards in the SkyBox Master Series: Creators Edition include a code that players can use to help finish the Skyborg mission. The missions can be completed without the use of these cards, however. The game features 105 characters from SkyBox's original trading card roster.

Players assume the role of Skyborg, a cyborg in the year 2025, on an overpopulated Earth low on food. Dr. Sinclair Barton has created a torus-shaped pocket universe to alleviate this problem. Players must enter this universe and travel from planet to planet gathering clues to figure out what has gone wrong and where Dr. Barton is.

=== Planets ===
- Lost – A mall-like planet.
- Merika – Post-apocalyptic wasteland.
- Survivors – Bizarre world that has physically fragmented.
- Grotton – Magical Medieval planet.
- Gibralte – Technologically advanced planet.
- Naugle – Swamp planet.
- Projectile – Polluted, mid-level technology planet.
- Marcon –

== Development ==
Skyborg: Into the Vortex was the first and only video CD-ROM video game developed by SkyBox International, at the time the largest trading card manufacturer in the United States, based in Durham, North Carolina. It was a cross-platform title, supporting both Classic Mac OS and Windows 3.1. SkyBox developed it with two other companies based in Durham: Top Dog Marketing and Signal Design. The game was largely the brainchild of George White, president of Top Dog, who was the primary story writer for the game. Top Dog oversaw the game's production, while White was personally responsible for the game's creative marketing and public relations. Skyborg was the first narrative that White had written. The game's lead designer was Carl Schnurr. Its working title was Projectile World.

Fringe Multimedia, primarily a developer of multimedia software, programmed Skyborg. Fringe developed the game on a modest budget. It was one of the company's final titles, as Fringe dissolved in early 1997. Speaking of the experience in 1997, Rob Terrell of Fringe stated that competition from more well-heeled multimedia companies left the company with virtually no work: "If you aren't able to sink a million dollars into a title, no one wants to talk to you anymore".

Skyborg features a soundtrack composed by the Los Angeles metal band Primal Future.

== Reception ==
Skyborg: Into the Vortex was released on November 15, 1995. Lance Elko of React reviewed the game positively, praising the music and graphics. On the other hand, Next Generation, reviewing the PC version of the game, rated it one star out of five, and stated that "Even though the game looks great, it moved about a quick as a pregnant whale, and after a few hours going around in circles, it's not going to hold much interest."
