= BreaKey =

Dutch toy

BreaKey is a toy by BreaKey N.V., which was licensed by Upper Deck. It was released in 2002 in The Netherlands and in 2003 in Germany and the United States, before being discontinued in 2005.

== Gameplay ==
Two players have to insert their keys into each other, and twist. One key breaks, while the other stays intact. The broken key loses. After one key is broken, it can still be used to construct constructions with the broken piece as the connector. You can also collect the broken keys.

=== Online ===
On the keys, there was a part with a scratchable layer, which would reveal a code. This code could be entered on the game's website to activate a virtual key. Prizes could be received for how well your online key did. By June 2002, the site had 4.000 daily visits and 25.000 registered users.

== Marketing ==
=== Television shows ===
There were two television shows produced for the marketing of BreaKey. One was aired on the FoxKids/V8 channel in the Netherlands, the other on RTL Zwei in Germany.

=== Licensing ===
Upper Deck was the distributor for the BreaKeys in the entire world except for Brazil, Venezuela and the BeNeLux region, for which it paid $2.5 million yearly or 10% of all sales, whichever was higher. The company produced BreaKeys with images relating to MLB players, One Piece characters, and Medabots. Plans were also made for licensing deals with Pokémon, Marvel, the NHL and the NFL. Studio 100 was the distributor for the BreaKeys in the BeNeLux, and organized licences with Suske en Wiske and Spring. The Spring marketing campaign became a failure, and as a result a complete warehouse of BreaKeys had to be liquidated. Plans were also made for a larger international expansion to countries such as Spain, Portugal, France, and Israel.

Upper Deck worked with Buzzmarketing in a deal to sponsor an American tour for a band from Orlando, Florida, in exchange for a song about the product, which would be requested to be played on American radio stations.

=== Tour ===
In Germany, Austria and Switzerland, there was a tour and tournament for the BreaKeys, where the winner of each tournament would be crowned the "Keymaster".

== Lawsuits ==
In 2003, Upper Deck and BreaKey International, the company behind the product, sued each other in regards to the BreaKey product and the website development. Eventually, Upper Deck was forced to pay BreaKey International $2.5 million.

Buzzmarketing also sued Upper Deck for alleged breach of contract in regards to the work done with the marketing campaign with the band, but this claim was denied.

In July 2005, BreaKey and Upper Deck sued each other again over trademark oppositions regarding the terms "Breakoff," "Breakzoff" and "Breakeze".

== Official websites ==
- www.gobreakey.com (Former International Website)
- breakey.nl (Current Website)
