= Susan Montgomery Williams =

American record-holding bubblegum-blower (1961-2008)

- Born: Susan Montgomery; February 16, 1961; National City, California, US
- Died: October 1, 2008 (aged 47); Fresno, California
- Known for: Bubblegum-blowing

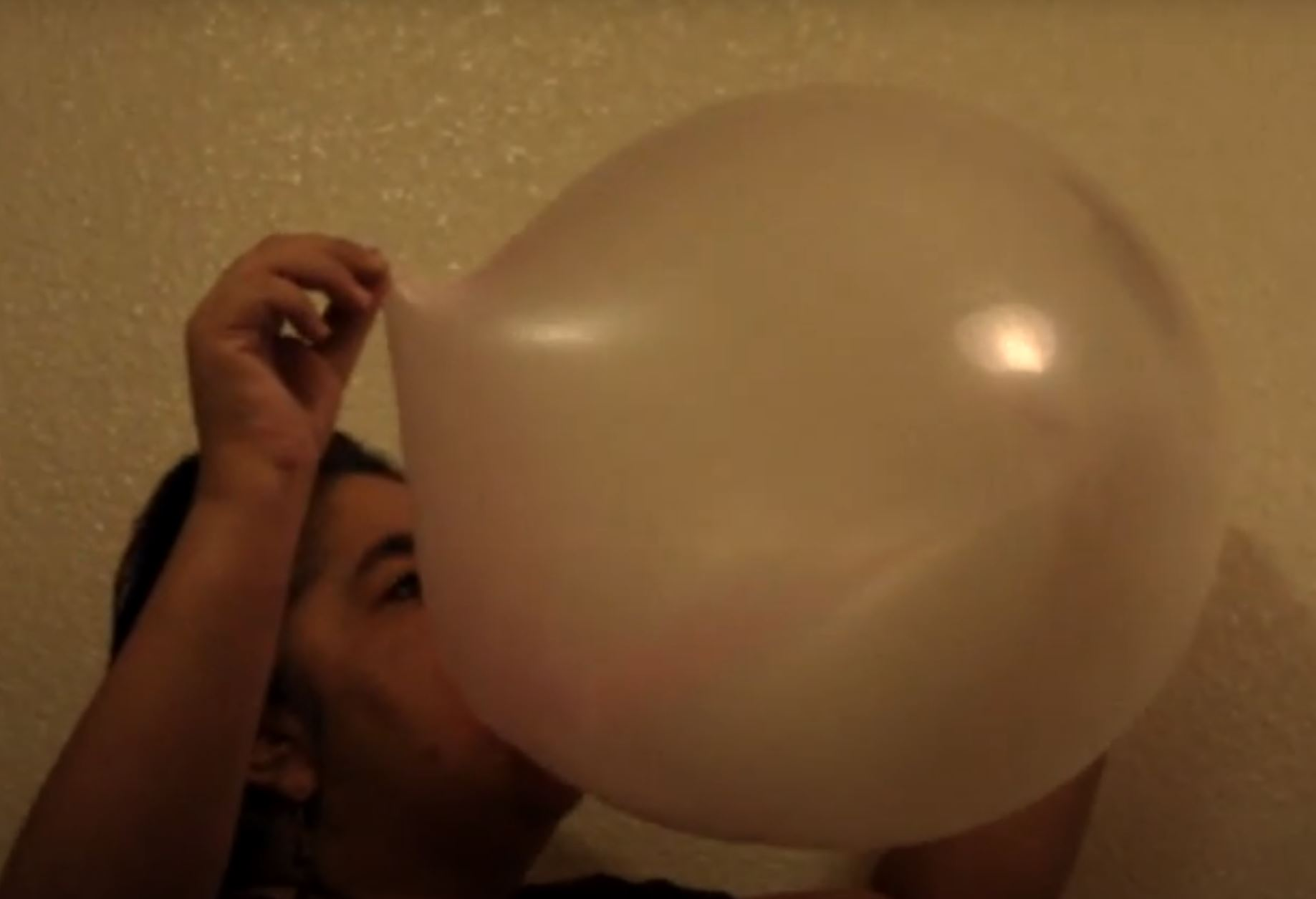
Susan blowing one of her Guinness word record bubbles

Susan Montgomery Williams (February 16, 1961 - October 1, 2008) was an American record-holding bubblegum-blower. She set a Guinness World Record for the largest bubble blown, 23 in (58 cm) in diameter, in 1994.

== Early life ==
Susan Montgomery was born in National City, California, and grew up in the San Joaquin Valley. As a student at Roosevelt High School in Fresno, she discovered and developed her bubble-blowing talent. She did not graduate from high school and later qualified for disability insurance due to epilepsy.

== Bubblegum-blowing ==
In 1994, Williams set a Guinness World Record for bubblegum-blowing with a 23 in-wide (58 cm) bubble. Susan had tricks and tips to blowing bubbles as big as she did, called the "Susan "Mont-Gum-ery" Williams technique, which she would say proudly before blowing her world record bubbles. Videos of this technique and her records are on youtube.

In addition to blowing the largest bubbles, Williams was said she could pop her gum louder than any competitors. Due to her loud gum popping, in October 1989 she was arrested at the Fresno Fair after her loud popping disturbed attendees at an outdoor Smokey Robinson concert and she refused to desist. Those charges were dropped in February 1990, but while in the courthouse to answer those charges, Williams' popping in the hallway disturbed jury selection in a murder case. Bailiffs at first believed the noise came from a gunshot. Though protesting that no law forbids gum chewing in hallways, Williams was arrested, fined $150, and sentenced to serve 30 days in jail. The sentence was suspended "on the condition that she never snap or pop gum in the courthouse again".

Williams made television appearances in Spain, Germany, England, Japan, and the United States, including on The Johnny Carson Show and The Jay Leno Show. In July 1990, a Smithsonian magazine article on bubblegum featured a photo of Williams blowing a 22 inches (56 cm) bubble. Williams maintained a Myspace page, "ChewsySuzy", which explained: "She learned that she could touch a bubble without popping it. Then she found she could begin a bubble by holding it with her fingers and holding it away from her nose and chin." In 1993 she appeared on The Chevy Chase Show. She has been photographed with many celebrities during her pop-culture 1990's circuit, including Will Smith and others.

== Personal life ==
She married Joseph C. Williams Jr., with whom she had two children, Bonnie and Jenny. Susan enjoyed their marriage together. Susan being a Wonder Woman mother, helped raise the two kids while traveling around the world, doing talk show interviews and public events. Joseph worked hard in his career while being a father. They later divorced mutually.

Susan had a sister and brothers, nieces and nephews, who she spent her time with in her downtime. She had a "Gum Closet" full of gum that she would happily share from her sponsors and events. She would spend hours teaching her family and friends how to successfully blow the biggest bubbles they could. She had her own method of bubble gum blowing that she called "The Susan Secret"

Susan spent time writing poetry and making crossword puzzles, gum themed and otherwise.

In September 2008 Williams suffered a stroke. She died of an aneurysm at the age of 47 on October 1, 2008, in Fresno.
