= Fleer =

American bubble gum manufacturer

Fleer/Skybox International LP
- Formerly: Fleer Corporation
- Type: Private (1885–91); Public (1991-1992); Subsidiary (1992–2005)
- Industry: Confectionery, collectibles
- Founded: 1885
- Founder: Frank H. Fleer
- Defunct: May 31, 2005; 21 years ago
- Fate: Merged with SkyBox to form "Fleer/SkyBox International" in 1995; brand acquired by Upper Deck in 2005
- Headquarters: Philadelphia, Pennsylvania, U.S.
- Products: Bubble gum, trading cards
- Brands: Blibber-Blubber; Dubble Bubble; Ultra; Flair
- Owner: (Brand name): Upper Deck (2005–present)
- Parent: Marvel Entertainment (1992–1999); Alex Grass (1999–2005)

Fleer/Skybox International LP was an American manufacturing company. Established as Fleer Corporation by Frank H. Fleer in 1885, it was the first company to successfully manufacture bubble gum, remaining a family-owned enterprise until 1989.

Fleer became known as a maker of sports cards, starting in 1923 with the production of baseball cards. Fleer also released American football (1960) and basketball (1986) card sets through its history. The company also produced some non-sports trading cards.

Fleer was purchased by Marvel Comics in 1992. It was then merged in 1995 with the trading card company SkyBox International. In 1998, the Dubble Bubble brand was acquired by Canadian company Concord Confections; Concord, in turn, was acquired by Chicago-based Tootsie Roll Industries in 2004. In 2005, Fleer was suspended its trading card operations and sold off the Fleer trade name to competitor Upper Deck.

== History ==
=== Beginning and early card attempts ===
Frank Henry Fleer, founder

The Frank H. Fleer & Company was founded as a confectionary business by Frank H. Fleer in 1885 in Philadelphia. The company had initially been established in 1849 by Fleer's father-in-law, Otto Holstein, a flavor extractor. The facility was on the future location of the Eakins Oval. The company's first success came in 1895, when it patented Chiclets, a candy-coated gum, which added a layer of crunch and kept the gum fresh. Fleer attempted to develop a chewing gum formula that could be used to blow bubbles. He developed Blibber-Blubber in 1906, but the gum proved inferior to regular chewing gum, and was never marketed to the public. Fleer sold the rights to Chiclets to the American Chicle Company in 1914.

Frank Fleer died in 1921. His son-in-law, Gilbert Mustin, then took control of the company and moved the factory to North Philadelphia. The company first issued trading cards in 1923, including the likes of Mary Pickford, Wild Bill Hickok, Babe Ruth, Gloria Swanson, and U.S. Presidents in its packs of candy.

In 1928, Fleer employee Walter Diemer improved the Blibber-Blubber formulation to produce the first commercially successful bubble gum, Dubble Bubble. Its pink color set a tradition for nearly all bubble gums to follow. In 1930, the company began mass producing Dubble Bubble in a Olney, Philadelphia factory. The company saw no competition in the bubble gum market until Topps introduced its Bazooka gum in 1947. By the start of World War II, the bubble gum business had grown into a $4.5 million industry. However, a shortage in ingredients led Fleer and other producers to stop making bubble gum during the war.

Looking to compete with its rival Topps in 1959, Fleer signed baseball star Ted Williams to a contract and sold an 80-card set oriented around highlights of his career. Fleer was unable to include other players because rival company Topps had signed most active baseball players to exclusive contracts. The company produced a Baseball Greats series in 1960, which featured Williams, Ruth, Ty Cobb, and Connie Mack. Over the next two years, football, basketball, and even non-sports cards, including The Three Stooges and Gomer Pyle, were produced. By 1963, Fleer was able to sign 3,000 minor league baseball players to release a 66-card set, but Topps quickly used the legal system to uphold its exclusive rights to package cards with its bubble gum. Fleer then abandoned baseball card production.

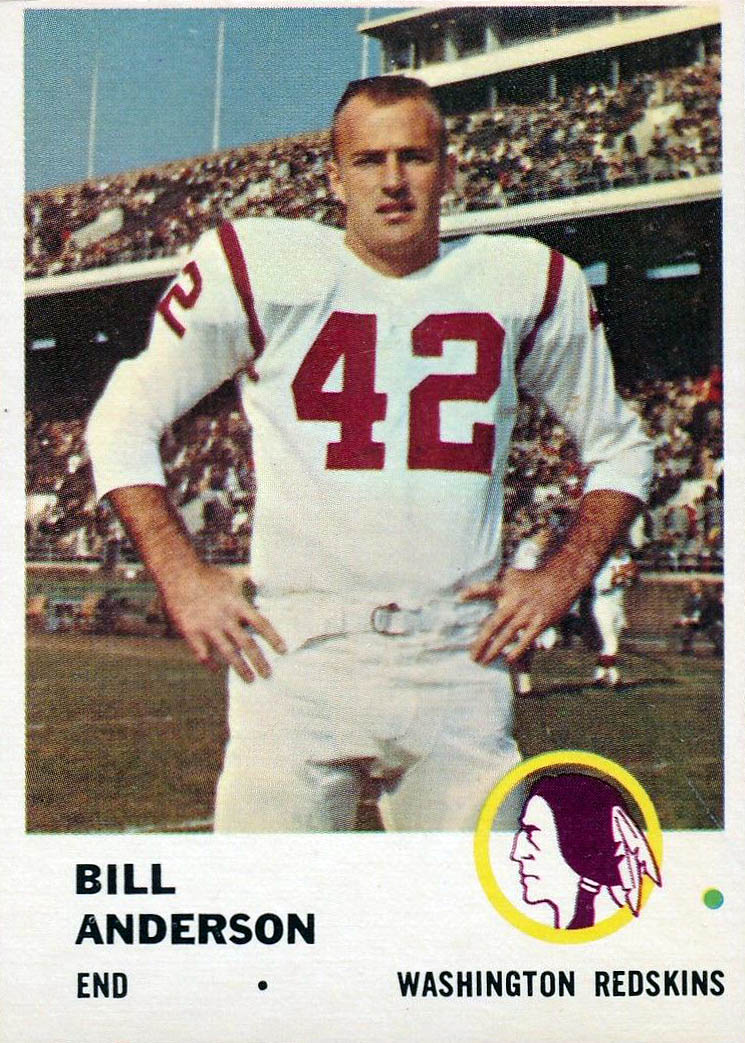
Bill Anderson football card of 1961. Fleer produced football cards from 1960 to 1964

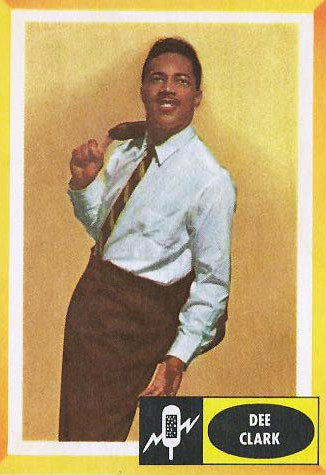
Fleer also produced non-sports cards such this one depicting singer Dee Clark in 1960

Fleer took advantage of the emergence of the American Football League (AFL) in 1960 to begin producing football cards. Fleer produced a set for the AFL while Topps cards covered the established National Football League. In 1961, each company produced cards featuring players from both leagues. The next year reverted to the status quo ante, with Fleer covering the AFL and Topps the NFL. In 1964, Philadelphia Gum secured the rights for NFL cards and Topps took over the AFL.

=== Fleer vs. Topps ===
With no product in either baseball or football, the company now turned its efforts to supporting an administrative complaint filed against Topps by the Federal Trade Commission. The complaint focused on the baseball card market, alleging that Topps was engaging in unfair competition through its aggregation of exclusive contracts. A hearing examiner ruled against Topps in 1965, but the Commission reversed this decision on appeal. The Commission concluded that because the contracts only covered the sale of cards with gum, competition was still possible by selling cards with other small, low-cost products. Fleer chose not to pursue such options and instead sold its remaining player contracts to Topps for $395,000 in 1966 ($3,344,211.42 in 2021 dollars). The decision gave Topps an effective monopoly of the baseball card market.

In 1968, Fleer was approached by the Major League Baseball Players Association, a recently organized players' union, about obtaining a group license to produce cards. The MLBPA was in a dispute with Topps over player contracts, and offered Fleer the exclusive rights to market cards of most players starting in 1973, when many of Topps's contracts would expire. Since this was so far in the future, Fleer declined the proposal.

Fleer returned to the union in September 1974 with a proposal to sell 5-by-7-inch satin patches of players, somewhat larger than normal baseball cards. By now, the MLBPA had settled its differences with Topps and reached an agreement that gave Topps a right of first refusal on such offers. Topps passed on the opportunity, indicating that it did not think the product would be successful. The union, also fearing that it would cut into existing royalties from Topps sales, then rejected the proposal.

In April 1975, Fleer asked for Topps to waive its exclusive rights and allow Fleer to produce stickers, stamps, or other small items featuring active baseball players. Topps refused, and Fleer then sued both Topps and the MLBPA to break the Topps monopoly. After several years of litigation, the Topps monopoly on baseball cards was finally broken by a lawsuit decided by federal judge Clarence Charles Newcomer in 1980, in which the judge ended Topps's exclusive right to sell baseball cards with gum, allowing Fleer to compete in the market. The court ordered the union to offer group licenses for baseball cards to companies other than Topps. Fleer and another company, Donruss, were thus allowed to begin making cards in 1981. Fleer's legal victory was overturned after one season, but the company continued to manufacture cards, substituting stickers with team logos for gum. Legal battles between the two companies continued.

During this time, many competitors began to introduce soft bubble gum to the market to compete against Fleer's former Dubble Bubble. Life Savers introduced Bubble Yum in 1975. Bubblicious was released by American Chicle the following year. Wrigley released Big League Chew in 1980. In turn, Fleer partnered with Gatorade to create Gatorgum, which lasted until 1989.

=== Key card sets ===
In 1984, Fleer released its first update set, which includes in-season additions and trades. The first cards included Dwight Gooden, Roger Clemens, and Kirby Puckett.

In 1986, Fleer helped resurrect the basketball card industry by releasing an officially NBA-licensed 132-card 1986–87 Fleer Basketball set which included the rookie cards of NBA Hall of Famers Michael Jordan, Chris Mullin, Clyde Drexler, Joe Dumars, Hakeem Olajuwon, Isiah Thomas, Dominique Wilkins, Karl Malone, Patrick Ewing and Charles Barkley. The set also included an additional 11 card All Star sticker set featuring a second rookie card and sticker of Michael Jordan. From 1986-1988, Fleer was the only major card company that produced basketball cards.

=== Public company ===
Gilbert Mustin Jr., grandson of the original founder, sold Fleer in 1989 for just under $70 million to Paul Mullan and Charter House Investments. By this point, Fleer was pushing into retail chains like Rite Aid. Also in 1989, the company entered the candy business with the purchase of Asher candy canes from Leaf. Asher Candy Company was established as a subsidiary and production remained in New Hyde Park, New York.

In 1991, the company went public and also introduced Fleer Ultra as its premium line of cards. Its headquarters were moved to Mount Laurel, New Jersey in February 1992

=== Marvel Entertainment ===
Comic book company Marvel Entertainment purchased Fleer on July 24, 1992, for $265 million. Fleer Entertainment Group released its first NHL cards that year. By 1994, Fleer was selling $38 million worth of gum but $245 million worth in trading cards. During this time, the company began releasing cards with television and film tie-ins, including Beavis and Butt-Head, Mighty Morphin Power Rangers, Casper, and Batman. Fleer made up about half of Marvel's revenues at this point.

In March 1995, Marvel purchased another card company, SkyBox International for $150 million. Fleer/Skybox reduced its push into retail chains to start its Hobby Bullpen program that committed the company to support and provide relief for hobby dealers and collectors.

The Olney facility was closed in 1996, card production was outsourced, and gum production was moved to Byhalia, Mississippi.

Fleer began production of a super premium flagship set, called Flair, in 1993. Flair had an announced production run of 15% of Ultra. Flair was printed on very thick card stock, about twice the thickness of regular cards, and used a unique glossy finish and six color printing.

Marvel entered bankruptcy in 1996 along with its subsidiaries. Fleer was directly hurt by the 1994 Major League Baseball strike and prolonged lockouts in the NBA. In June 1997, Marvel formed its Marvel Enterprise division, headed by president and CEO Scott C. Marden, to manage its trading card and sticker businesses, as well as Marvel Interactive, an Internet-entertainment and software-publishing company. Fleer's confections division, including Dubble Bubble was sold off to Concord Confections for $18.7 million around this time. After nearly two years, Marvel emerged from bankruptcy in October 1998.

=== Sale of Fleer/Skybox ===
Fleer/Skybox was placed on the market by Marvel at an asking price of $30 million. In February 1999, it was sold to Rite Aid founder Alex Grass and his son Roger. By 2003, Grass began looking to sell the business but ultimately turned down a $25 million offer from Upper Deck.

Hoping to diversify its card business, Fleer acquired a license deal from WWE to produce and distribute WWE trading cards from 2001 to 2004. It also launched the Ophidian 2350 collectible card game in 2003, but cancelled expansion plans the following year.

=== Closing and sale to Upper Deck ===
Weighed down by $40 million in debt, Fleer announced in early 2005 that it would cease all production of trading cards and file an Assignment for the Benefit of Creditors, which is a State Court liquidation, similar to Chapter 7 bankruptcy. In July 2005, Upper Deck acquired the rights to the Fleer name at auction for $6.1 million and began producing Fleer-branded basketball, ice hockey and American football cards. Fleer's remaining assets were fully liquidated at the end of 2007.

In 2006, Upper Deck produced baseball sets under the names Fleer, Fleer Ultra, Fleer Tradition, Flair, Skybox Autographics and Fleer Greats of the Game. The last Fleer-branded baseball cards appeared in 2007.

In 2025, Upper Deck brought back the Fleer Flair banner for its hockey sets. It also re-used the Ultra name for non-sport collections such as Superman sets.

== Controversies ==
=== Bill Ripken card ===
In 1989, Bill Ripken's Fleer card showed him holding a bat with the expletive "fuck face" written in plain view on the knob of the bat. Fleer subsequently rushed to correct the error, and in its haste, released versions in which the text was scrawled over with a marker, whited out with correction fluid, and also airbrushed. On the final, corrected version, Fleer obscured the offensive words with a black box (this was the version included in all factory sets). Both the original card and many of the corrected versions have become collector's items as a result. There are at least ten different variations of this card. As of February 2009 the white out version has a book value of $120, but has been sold in mint condition on eBay for asking prices as high as $400. Years later, Ripken admitted he wrote the expletive on the bat to distinguish it as a batting practice bat, and did not intend to use it for the card.

Some collectors list the card as the "Rick Face" card. The script on the bat appears to make the word fuck look similar to Rick.
