= Dubble Bubble =

Brand of bubble gum

- Product type: Bubble gum
- Current owner: Tootsie Roll Industries
- Country: United States
- Introduced: 1928; 98 years ago
- Markets: Tootsie Pop Palace
- Previous owners: Fleer; Concord Confections
- Website: thedubblebubble.com

Dubble Bubble is an American brand of fruit-flavored, usually pink-colored, bubble gum invented by Walter Diemer, an accountant at Philadelphia-based Fleer Chewing Gum Company in 1928. It is considered the first commercially sold bubble gum and was well known for the comics printed on its wrapper. The pink color used in Dubble Bubble has also become synonymous with chewing gum.

Dubble Bubble
Nutritional value per 2 (20 grams)
- Energy: 70 kcal (290 kJ)
- Carbohydrates: 18
- Sugars: 14
- Dietary fiber: 0
- Fat: 0
- Saturated: 0
- Trans: 0
- Protein: 0
Vitamins and minerals
Vitamins	Quantity %DV^{†}
Vitamin A equiv.	0% 0 μg
Vitamin C	0% 0 mg
Minerals	Quantity %DV^{†}
Calcium	0% 0 mg
Iron	0% 0 mg
Potassium	0% 1 mg
Sodium	0% 0 mg
- Other constituents: Quantity
- Cholesterol: 0
- ^{†}Percentages estimated using US recommendations for adults, except for potassium, which is estimated based on expert recommendation from the National Academies.

== History ==
At the time, chewing gum was typically formulated from chicle, a type of sticky sap. Fleer Chewing Gum Company founder Frank H. Fleer had tried to develop a formula that allowed bubbles to be blown without sticking to the face. He previously developed Blibber-Blubber in 1906, but it was shelved for being too sticky and breaking apart too easily.

In 1928, Walter Diemer, a 23-year-old accountant at the firm, developed a new formula that was less sticky than regular chewing gum, and allowed him to create bubbles easily. The gum was colored pink because it was the only available food coloring at the time. Fleer took over the recipe and sold it under the Dubble Bubble name.

The gum was packaged in wax paper and sold for a penny. Sales surpassed $1.5 million in the first year. To help sell the new bubble gum, Diemer himself taught salespeople how to blow bubbles so that they in turn could teach potential customers. By 1930, the company began mass producing Dubble Bubble at a factory in the Olney neighborhood of Philadelphia. The facility remained open until 1996, when production moved to Mississippi.

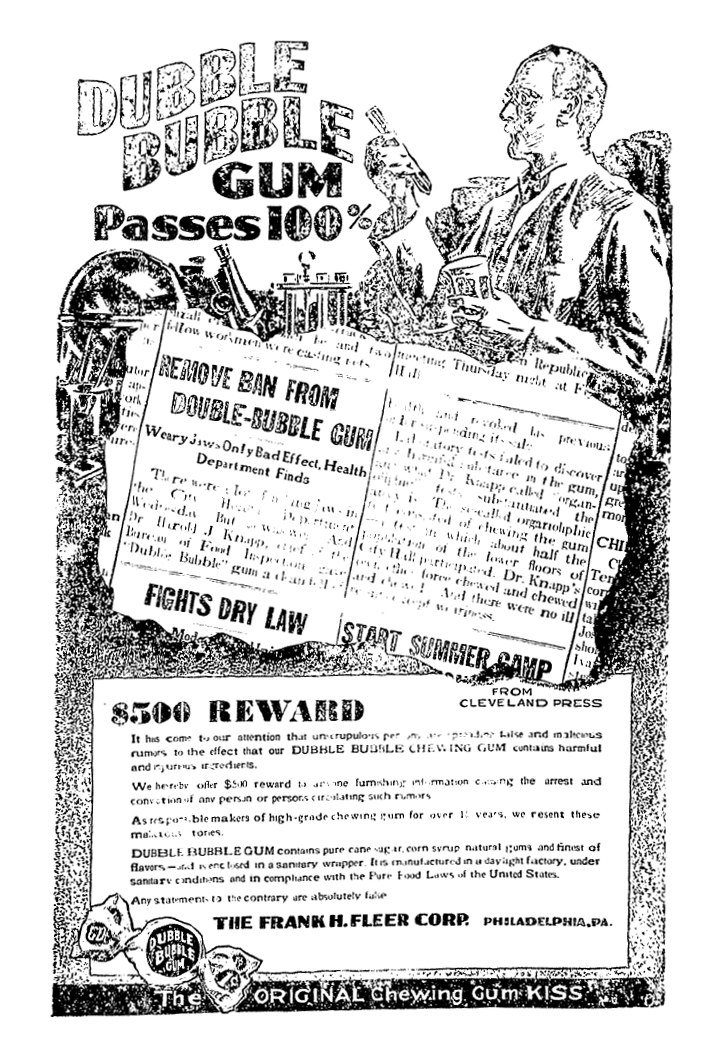
1929 newspaper ad for the gum

The original gum featured a color comic strip, known as the Fleer Funnies, which was included with the gum. The featured characters, 'Dub and Bub', were introduced in 1930 but were replaced by the iconic Pud and his pals in 1950. Originally, Pud was much more rotund than the slimmed down version seen in the 1960s. The early comics were especially large and colorful. The comic also included Fleer Fortunes and Dubble Bubble Facts.

The comics were sequentially numbered which made collecting them easy. More than 1,002 comics have been released over the years. During World War II, sugar and latex became scarce, so bubble gum manufacturing was halted in 1942 and didn't resume until 1951.

Over time, Fleer extended its reach by adding new flavors and new formats like ball gum and expanded distribution of its products overseas. In 1957, Fleer introduced the first gum 6-pack with Dubble Bubble.

In 1998, Dubble Bubble was sold off to Toronto-based Concord Confections. Under Concord, a gumball variant was introduced in 1999. Distribution was also expanded to 60 countries worldwide. In 2003, Tootsie Roll Industries acquired Concord for $197 million.

Since Concord's acquisition, Dubble Bubble has since used a different recipe and also discontinued the comic strips and fortunes on the wrappers, but continued to use Pud as its mascot.

== Ingredients ==
The main ingredients in Dubble Bubble gum are Sugar, Dextrose, Corn Syrup, Gum Base, Tapioca Dextrin, Titanium Dioxide, Confectioner's Glaze, Carnauba Wax, Corn Starch, Artificial Flavors, Artificial Colors, (FD&C Red 40, Blue 1, Yellow 5, Yellow 6, Red 3), and BHT (to maintain freshness).

The ingredients of "1928 Original" Dubble Bubble gum are Sugar, Dextrose, Corn Syrup, Gum Base, Artificial Flavor, Color, Corn Starch and BHT.

Dubble Bubble gum products are nut-free, gluten-free, and peanut-free .

Dubble Bubble twist gummies is a 6 g, bite-size piece of chewing gum containing 20 calories with 0 g of fat, 0 mg of cholesterol, 5 mg of sodium, 5 g of carbohydrates, 0 g of dietary fiber, 4 g of sugar and 0 g of protein. Dubble Bubble Ball Gum is available in 5 g servings containing 20 calories, 5 mg of sodium, 5 g of carbs and 4 g of sugars. Dubble Bubble specialty bubble-gum cigars come in 20 g servings and contain 70 calories, 18 g of carbs and 15 g of sugar. Dubble Bubble Office Pleasures bite-size gum pieces come in 3.5 g servings containing 15 calories, 3 g of carbs and 3 g of sugar.

== See also ==
- List of confectionery brands
