= Walter Diemer =

American inventor of bubble gum (1904–1998)

- Born: January 8, 1905; Philadelphia, Pennsylvania, U.S.
- Died: January 8, 1998 (aged 93); Lancaster, Pennsylvania, U.S.
- Occupation: Accountant
- Employer: Fleer
- Known for: Inventing bubble gum
- Spouses: Adelaide (died 1990); Florence (m. 1996–1998)
- Children: 2

Walter E. Diemer (January 8, 1905 – January 8, 1998) was an American accountant who, in 1928, invented bubble gum.

== Life ==
Born and raised in Philadelphia, Pennsylvania, Diemer was working as an accountant at Fleer in 1926 when the company president sought to cut costs by making their own gum base. The company's founder, Frank Fleer, had previously made a batch of bubble gum in 1906 which he called Blibber-Blubber, but it was too sticky and easily broke. Ultimately, the modern form of bubble gum was invented in 1928 in Philadelphia and has remained his greatest achievement.

Although an accountant by trade, Diemer liked to experiment with gum recipes in his spare time. In doing so, he accidentally stumbled upon a unique recipe. The gum was pink because it was the only food coloring in the factory, which is the reason most bubble gum today is pink.

Compared to standard chewing gum, the gum was less sticky, would not stick to the face, and yet stretched more easily. Diemer saw the possibilities, and using a salt water taffy wrapping machine, wrapped one hundred pieces of his creation to test market in a local mom-and-pop candy store. Priced at one penny a piece, the gum sold out in one day.

Fleer began marketing the new gum as "Dubble Bubble" and Diemer himself taught salesmen how to blow bubbles as a selling point for the gum, helping them to demonstrate how Dubble Bubble differed from all other chewing gums. Sold at the price of one cent a piece, sales of Dubble Bubble surpassed US$1.5 million in the first year. However, Diemer did not patent his invention and competition soon arose as bubble gum became a popular and inexpensive treat during the Great Depression.

According to his second wife, Florence, Walter Diemer never received royalties for his invention but he did not mind. She also said he oversaw construction of bubble gum plants in Philadelphia and Barcelona, Spain, and traveled around the world marketing the gum. He stayed with Fleer for decades, eventually reaching the position of senior vice president as well as a member of the Board of Directors of the Fleer Corporation. He retired in 1970, and remained on the board for 15 more years thereafter. Following the death of his first wife Adelaide in 1990, Diemer rode around his Pennsylvania retirement village in a big tricycle, distributing bubble gum to children.

Diemer died of congestive heart failure in Lancaster, Pennsylvania, on his 93rd birthday. Saturday Night Live joked that his body was found stuck under a movie theatre seat.
