= Rookie card =

Trading card featuring a rookie athlete

A rookie card is a trading card that is the first to feature an athlete after that athlete has participated in the highest level of competition within their sport. Collectors may value these first appearances more than subsequent card issues. Athletes are often commemorated on trading cards which are highly collected based on the popularity of the athlete. Prices for rookie cards fluctuate based on consumer interest, supply and demand and other factors, but can surpass thousands of dollars.

In MLB 2023–2024 season, each player making their debut this season will wear a patch on their jersey. At the end of the game, these patches were certified and integrated into their rookie cards by Topps.

== Definition ==
A rookie card is not necessarily always produced during a player's rookie season because there could have been cards that fit the definition printed in previous years. It is generally agreed that to be a true rookie card, the card must be counted as part of a product's base set. Thus, limited quantity insert cards of any type are generally not considered to be rookie cards.

In 2006 Major League Baseball instituted a set of guidelines which dictated what cards could and could not bear the official MLB rookie card logo. Despite these guidelines, many collectors still regard a player's "true" rookie card as being their first officially licensed prospect card.

== Debate ==
Debate within the hobby exists, as some collectors and pundits believe that an athlete's first appearance on any trading card qualifies as his rookie card. Others believe that a rookie card is the first licensed issue from a major manufacturer that is widely distributed. There can be more than one rookie card for a player.

This debate was exemplified when in 2001, Upper Deck, a trading card company, created a set of golf cards which featured Tiger Woods. However, Woods already had many cards from other manufacturers such as Sports Illustrated which included a young Tiger in a 1996 edition of their Sports Illustrated for Kids periodical, which routinely contains trading cards of various athletes. SI Kids cards have perforated edges and are normally unlicensed by the athlete. Hobby publication Beckett gave the 2001 Upper Deck Golf card a rookie card designation despite its arrival five years after the SI Kids release, sparking controversy.

The market, it appears, gives far greater credence and value to the 1996 Sports Illustrated for Kids release which sells for exponentially more. As it remains, there is no formal definition of a "rookie card," though some players do have cards that are considered "rookies" by all.

== Famous rookie cards ==
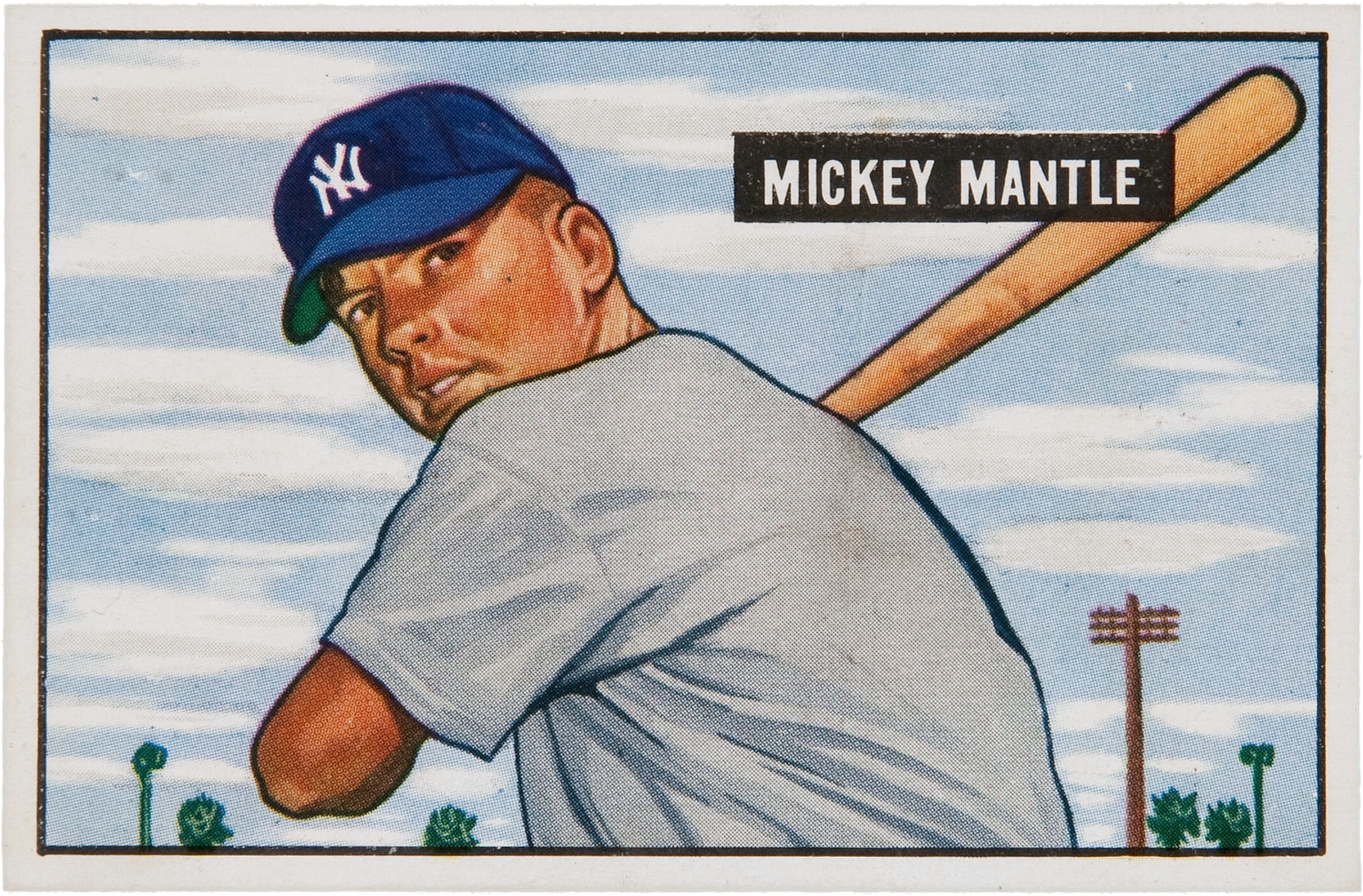
Mickey Mantle 1951 rookie card

=== 1989 Upper Deck Ken Griffey, Jr. ===
In the 1989 Upper Deck baseball set, Ken Griffey Jr. was selected to be featured on card number one. At press time, Griffey had not yet played a major league game, so Upper Deck used an image of Griffey in a San Bernardino Spirit uniform. Competitors such as Score and Topps neglected to include a card of Griffey in its 1989 base set, but later included him in their traded issues. Such neglect helped Upper Deck gain exposure due to the popularity of Griffey in the 1989 MLB season. Donruss and Fleer included Griffey rookie cards in their respective base sets, but they were never as popular as the Upper Deck issue. Also an afterthought was Griffey's 1989 Bowman Rookie Card.

Despite the popularity of the Griffey card, it was not a scarce card. The card was situated in the top left hand corner of the uncut sheets and was more liable to be cut poorly or have its corners dinged. Company policy was that if a customer found a damaged card in its package, the company would replace it. Many Griffey cards were returned and the result was that Upper Deck printed many uncut sheets (sheets consisting of 100 cards) of just Ken Griffey Jr. According to Professional Sports Authenticator, the Ken Griffey Jr. would become the most graded card of all time with the company. PSA graded over 50,000 of the cards. The Beckett Grading card service has evaluated over 25,000 of the Ken Griffey Jr. rookie cards.

=== 1986–87 Fleer Michael Jordan Rookie card ===
Michael Jordan Rookie Card, graded as a 9 by PSA, was sold for US$12,500 on April 24, 2020.
