= Rutan & Tucker =

Rutan & Tucker, LLP
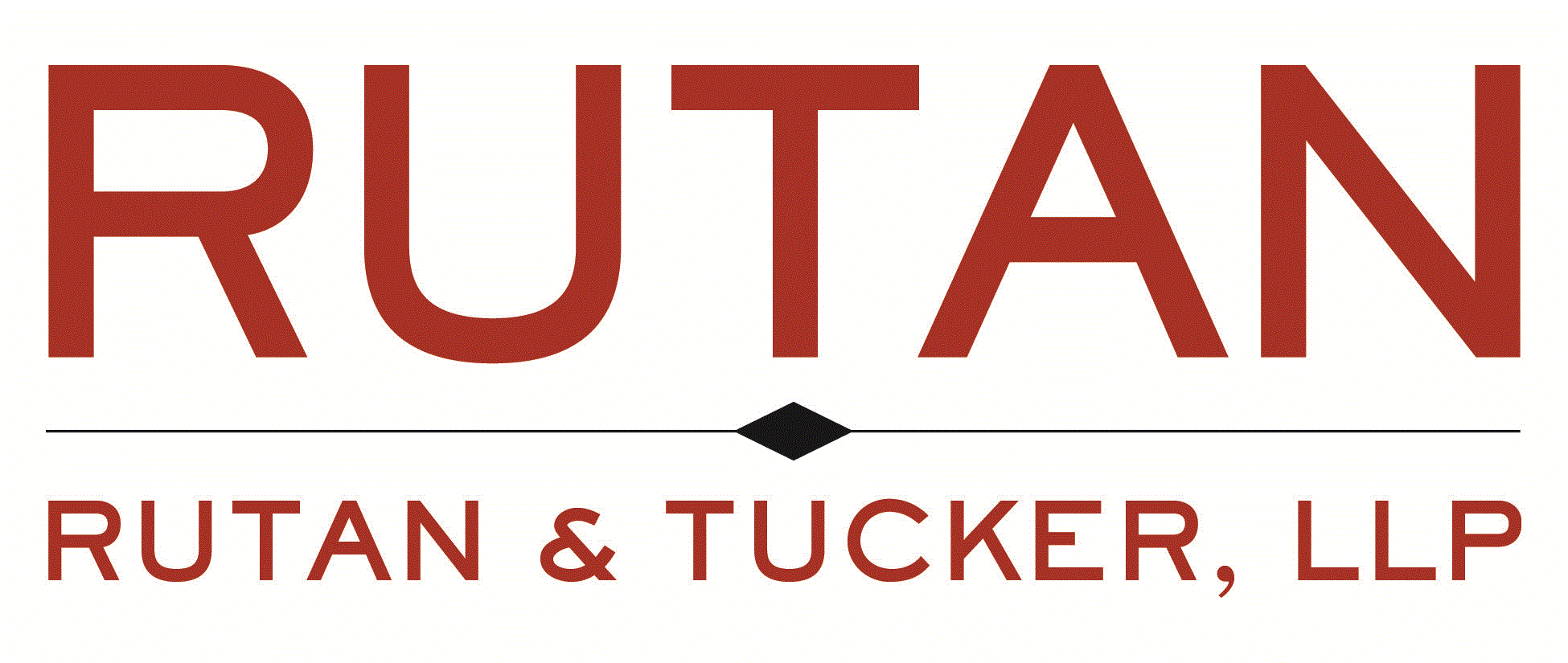
- Founded: Orange County, California (1906)
- Founder: A.W. Rutan
- Headquarters: 18575 Jamboree Road, 9th Floor Irvine, CA 92612, Irvine, California, United States
- Services: full-service law firm
- Number of employees: 150+
- Website: www.rutan.com

Rutan & Tucker, LLP is a law firm headquartered in Orange County, California

Rutan & Tucker is a full-service firm organized into more than 30 legal practice areas in seven groups: Litigation and Trial, Corporate and Tax, Employment, Government and Regulatory, Intellectual Property, Land Use and Entitlement and Real Estate. In addition to other practices, it is known for specializing in advice to local governments.

The company was founded in 1906 by A.W. Rutan. In 1940, Utah Superior Court Judge James B. Tucker joined, giving the firm its current name. Rutan & Tucker, LLP has offices in Irvine, Palo Alto, San Francisco and Scottsdale. The company has over 150 attorneys.
