= Performance test (bar exam) =

Section of the bar exam that simulates a real-life legal task

The performance test or "PT" is a section of bar examinations in the United States that is intended to mimic a real-life legal task that future lawyers may face. Of the three parts of most states' bar exams -- MBE, essay, and performance test—the performance test is supposed to be the most reflective of how well a candidate will perform outside of an academic setting.

A performance test may include tasks such as writing a legal memorandum, drafting an affidavit, or drafting a settlement offer letter to opposing counsel.

One problem with performance tests is that if they actually tested the current law of a state as it relates to a specific subject, bar applicants who attended law school in that state and took a course focused on that state's law on that subject might have an unfair advantage over applicants who did not. In other words, the performance test would be testing applicants' understanding of current state law, as opposed to their lawyering skills. To mitigate that advantage, performance tests normally use the law of a fictional state, and its law as provided in the test materials usually has subtle differences from the law in the real world in order to reduce the advantage of having already studied that subject matter in law school. This forces applicants to demonstrate their ability to interpret and apply the law as they find it, rather than the law they already know.

== California Bar Examination performance tests ==
Until 1983, the California Bar Examination was only two days long and had no performance test. During that era, it was criticized as too abstract and failing to test too few skills relevant to the actual practice of law, and was also criticized for disproportionate impact on persons of color.

In July 1980, the State Bar of California conducted an experiment with 485 bar applicants who volunteered to participate in performance tests in addition to taking the regular bar exam. To give applicants an incentive to participate, the experimental performance tests could only increase but not decrease their chances of passing the bar exam. The experiment was led by UCLA School of Law professor Paul Bergman and RAND Corporation psychometrician Stephen P. Klein. Based on their results, the State Bar added a three-hour-long performance test to the July 1983 bar exam administration. California performance tests are usually situated in the fictional state of Columbia.

Through February 2017, the California bar exam spanned three days, and included two performance test sections, one the first day (Tuesday) and one the last day (Thursday). Each PT lasted three hours—for a total of six—and the two PTs were worth 26% of the total score. The types of tasks presented are:

1. Legal memorandum
2. Persuasive brief
3. Declaration or affidavit
4. Closing argument
5. Opening statement
6. Jury instructions
7. Witness cross or direct examination
8. Discovery/investigation plan
9. Client letter
10. Client or witness interview
11. Negotiation, settlement proposal or agreement
12. Analysis of a contract, will, trust or statute
13. Legislation
14. Alternative dispute resolution task

Each PT has a file and a library. The file contains factual materials about the case while the library contains the legal authorities needed. The candidates can either hand write or type using a laptop.

Effective July 2017, the California bar exam was reduced to two days, with a single 90-minute performance test administered on the first afternoon (Tuesday).

Exam	PT Name	Task / Assignment
July 2025	Tate v. Tate	Opinion Letter
Feb 2025 Retest	In re Dawes Family Partnership	Objective Memorandum
Feb 2025	Jamison v. Sunrise Ladder Co., Inc.	Opinion Letter
July 2024	State v. Dalton	Draft Closing Argument
Feb 2024	Panko v. Dahir	Persuasive Brief
July 2023	In re Marriage of Burke	Opinion "Recommendation" Letter
Feb 2023	State v. Hughes	Draft Oral Argument
July 2022	Niesi v. Gosling and Hardy	Objective Memorandum
Feb 2022	In re Price	Objective Memorandum
July 2021	Industrial Sandblasting, Inc. v. Morgan	Draft Closing Argument
Feb 2021	Matter of I.B.T.	Objective Memorandum
Oct 2020	In Re Potential Wright Litigation	Objective Memorandum
Feb 2020	Western Insurance Company v. SecureTrade, Inc.	Persuasive Letter
July 2019	State v. Martin	Objective Memorandum
Feb 2019	People v. Raymond	Persuasive Brief
July 2018	In the Matter of Abigail Watkins	Persuasive Brief
Feb 2018	Meaney v. Trustees of the University of Columbia	Objective Memorandum
July 2017	United States v. Blake C. Davis	Persuasive Letter
Feb 2017 (PT-A)	In re Columbia Nurses Association	Persuasive Letter
Feb 2017 (PT-B)	Claim by Blanchard Engineering, Inc. Against City of Corson	Objective Memorandum
July 2016 (PT-A)	In re Potential Wildomar Property Litigation	Persuasive Letter
July 2016 (PT-B)	Wong v. Pavlik Foods, Inc.	Objective Memorandum
Feb 2016 (PT-A)	In the Matter of Milly Nolan Fleck	Objective Memorandum
Feb 2016 (PT-B)	Jay Minor v. Lucinda Minor	Persuasive Memorandum of Points & Authorities
July 2015 (PT-A)	Wilson v. Belton Company, Inc.	Persuasive Memorandum of Points & Authorities
July 2015 (PT-B)	Barker v. Columbia Department of Administrative Hearings	Opinion Memorandum
Feb 2015 (PT-A)	In re Virta and Burnsen	Objective Memorandum
Feb 2015 (PT-B)	State v. Daniel	Persuasive Memorandum of Points & Authorities
July 2014 (PT-A)	Tehama County v. Tepee Campground	Objective Memorandum
July 2014 (PT-B)	Riley Instruments, Inc. v. LRI, Inc.	Persuasive Brief
Feb 2014 (PT-A)	Adams v. Kustom Spas, Inc.	Persuasive Brief
Feb 2014 (PT-B)	Rock v. Davis	Objective Memorandum
July 2013 (PT-A)	In re SIA	Objective Memorandum
July 2013 (PT-B)	People v. Draper	Objective Memorandum
Feb 2013 (PT-A)	Doral Digestive Medical Clinic v. Dr. Kyle Harris	Opinion Letter
Feb 2013 (PT-B)	In re Yamata Logging, Inc.	Persuasive Letter
July 2012 (PT-A)	In re CLEF, Inc.	Objective Memorandum
July 2012 (PT-B)	Flores v. Falk	Persuasive Memorandum of Points & Authorities
Feb 2012 (PT-A)	In re Swayne	Objective Memorandum
Feb 2012 (PT-B)	State v. Dolan	Draft Closing Argument
July 2011 (PT-A)	In re Brent Quillen	Objective Memorandum
July 2011 (PT-B)	David v. Sovereign Auto Store, Inc.	Persuasive Memorandum of Points & Authorities
Feb 2011 (PT-A)	Enviroscan, Inc. v. Structural Environmental Safety Agency	Objective Memorandum
Feb 2011 (PT-B)	In re Santos	Persuasive Memorandum of Points & Authorities
July 2010 (PT-A)	Vasquez v. Speakeasy, Inc. and Northern Center of Worship	Persuasive Brief
July 2010 (PT-B)	In re Black	Opinion Letter
Feb 2010 (PT-A)	Ochoa v. CMH	Alternative Dispute Resolution Opinion
Feb 2010 (PT-B)	Rettick v. Floyd Industries, LLC, et al.	Persuasive Memorandum of Points & Authorities
July 2009 (PT-A)	Farley v. Dunn	Statement of Uncontested Facts + Persuasive Brief
July 2009 (PT-B)	Williams v. Golub	Objective Memorandum
Feb 2009 (PT-A)	Pannine v. Dreslin, et al.	Persuasive Memorandum of Points & Authorities
Feb 2009 (PT-B)	Phoenix Towers v. Porter	Counseling Memorandum
July 2008 (PT-A)	Pearson v. Savings Galore	Objective Memorandum
July 2008 (PT-B)	People v. Duncan	Persuasive Memorandum of Points & Authorities
Feb 2008 (PT-A)	One-Stop Equipment Leasing v. Frank Reeves	Persuasive Memorandum of Points & Authorities
Feb 2008 (PT-B)	Snyder v. Regents of the University of Columbia	Objective Memorandum
July 2007 (PT-A)	Carter v. Reston Health	Objective Memorandum
July 2007 (PT-B)	Tanya and Mark Gross v. Baker	Persuasive Letter
Feb 2007 (PT-A)	Phenom Networks v. Jasmine Semiconductor	Persuasive Memorandum of Points & Authorities
Feb 2007 (PT-B)	In re Ergometriz, Inc.	Objective Memorandum
July 2006 (PT-A)	Savall Drugstores, Inc. v. Phister Pharmaceuticals Corp.	Persuasive Brief
July 2006 (PT-B)	Breene and Frost	Opinion Letter
Feb 2006 (PT-A)	Hensen v. Build a Burger	Persuasive Memorandum of Points & Authorities
Feb 2006 (PT-B)	Estate of Small	Persuasive Brief
July 2005 (PT-A)	In re Winstons	Persuasive Letter
July 2005 (PT-B)	Property Clerk v. Grinnell	Persuasive Brief / Memorandum of Points & Authorities
Feb 2005 (PT-A)	Sandra Castro v. Tom Miller	Persuasive Letter
Feb 2005 (PT-B)	Marriage of Eiffel	Persuasive Brief
July 2004 (PT-A)	Donovan v. Bargain Mart, Inc.	Objective Memorandum
July 2004 (PT-B)	Jaynes v. Palm Gardens Group	Persuasive Memorandum of Points & Authorities
Feb 2004 (PT-A)	In re Snow King Mountain Resort	Persuasive Letter + Objective Memorandum
Feb 2004 (PT-B)	In re Progressive Builders, Inc.	Opinion Letter
July 2003 (PT-A)	In re Marriage of Nittardi	Opinion Letter
July 2003 (PT-B)	In re Ryan Cox	Objective Memorandum
Feb 2003 (PT-A)	Morales et al. v. Parsons	Persuasive Memorandum
Feb 2003 (PT-B)	Reese v. Kennel Kare, Inc.	Objective Memorandum
July 2002 (PT-A)	In re Thomas Outdoor Advertising	Objective Memorandum
July 2002 (PT-B)	U.S. v. Alejandro Cruz	Objective Memorandum
Feb 2002 (PT-A)	Estate of Keefe	Draft Declaration + Statement of Disputed Facts + Persuasive Memorandum
Feb 2002 (PT-B)	Adair v. Oldfield	Objective Memorandum

== Multistate Performance Test ==
This is a test drafted by the National Conference of Bar Examiners (NCBE), modeled after the California test and intended as a supplement to NCBE's Multistate Essay Examination. NCBE currently offers three different performance tests, each 90 minutes long (as opposed to three hours in California). As of July 2007, 33 jurisdictions use the MPT. The MPT is usually situated in the fictional state of Franklin.

== Sources ==
- California Bar Exam
- National Conference of Bar Examiners Tests (click on link for Multistate Performance Test for more information)
