= Upper Deck Company =

American trading card company

The Upper Deck Company, LLC
- Type: Private LLC
- Industry: Collectibles
- Founded: 1988; 38 years ago in Yorba Linda, California, US
- Founder: Boris Korbel; Paul Sumner; Richard McWilliam
- Headquarters: Carlsbad, California, United States
- Area served: Worldwide
- Key people: Jason Masherah (President)
- Products: Trading cards, card games, lithographs
- Brands: O-Pee-Chee
- Number of employees: 250
- Website: upperdeck.com

The Upper Deck Company, LLC (known colloquially as Upper Deck and Upper Deck Authenticated, Ltd. in the United Kingdom) is a private company primarily known for producing trading cards. It was founded in 1988. Its headquarters are in Carlsbad, California, United States.

The company also produces sports-related items, such as figurines and die-cast toys, on top of having exclusive agreements to produce memorabilia, under the brand name "Upper Deck Authenticated", with athletes including Michael Jordan, Tiger Woods, LeBron James, Wayne Gretzky, Serena Williams, Roberto Luongo, Connor McDavid, and Ben Simmons. Under the Upper Deck Entertainment name, the company also produced card games, such as World of Warcraft and Vs. System.

Upper Deck is also the current licensor of the O-Pee-Chee brand since 2007, having released several baseball and ice hockey card collections.

== History ==
Paul Sumner created the Upper Deck concept in 1987. He worked in printing sales, as vice president of sales at Orbis Graphic in Anaheim, California, and came up with the idea for a premium card. When he heard about card counterfeiting, he realized he knew a way to protect cards. He had studied holograms in college and had used them in printing his company's brochures.

In late 1987, Sumner approached Richard McWilliam about creating "Architectural Digest-quality baseball cards." McWilliam was a businessman who had also played baseball in high school and college. Sumner’s boss, Boris Korbel, joined Sumner and McWilliam in setting out to produce a prototype to show dealers at national card shows. Sumner hired Robert Young Pelton to design and produce a prototype. Pelton did this for Upper Deck's first three-year rise. Pelton's agencies, Pelton & Associates and Digital Artists, were replaced by Chiat/Day.

On December 23, 1988, Upper Deck was granted a license by Major League Baseball (MLB) to produce baseball cards, and just two months later, on February 23, 1989, delivered its first two cases of baseball cards to George Moore of Tulsa's Baseball Card Store in Tulsa, Oklahoma. Its inaugural 1989 set stood out from other trading cards with its glossy fronts on heavy-duty cardboard (thicker than other card stocks), with an additional color photo on the back of each card and a counterfeit-proof tiny hologram marking. Upper Deck began selling packs for $0.99, more than double the price of a pack of Topps cards, and lacked "the traditional stick of bubble gum that would often stain the cards". Despite this, Upper Deck sold out its baseball cards midway through this inaugural year, then pre-sold its entire 1990 baseball stock before the year began. Upper Deck said "it purposely limited its initial 1989 production to just 1 million sets of each card" to help drive demand. Also, cards with misprints, such as the 1989 Atlanta Braves slugger Dale Murphy card with a reversed "rookie" designation and the 1990 Baltimore Oriole pitcher Ben McDonald card missing his "rookie" designation, were reselling for $150 and $100 each, respectively.

The 1990 set included the industry's first randomly inserted personally autographed and numbered cards of sports stars. All Upper Deck brands bear an exclusive trademark hologram, and Upper Deck was named "Card Set of the Year" every year from 1989 to 2004. Paul Sumner resigned with the understanding that he would be known as the "Co-Founder of Upper Deck," something the company's owner and CEO, McWilliam, recognized until McWilliam's death in 2013.

On March 20, 1990, Upper Deck received licenses from the National Hockey League (NHL) and the National Hockey League Players' Association (NHLPA) to produce hockey cards. The company also obtained licenses from the National Football League (NFL) and the National Basketball Association (NBA) in 1990, making Upper Deck the first trading card company in 10 years to be licensed by all four leagues. Upper Deck quickly rivaled Topps, which had been considered the standard, and other competitors, such as Fleer, Donruss, and Score. Before the end of March, 1990 Upper Deck had gained a fourth partner, Richard Kughn, and grown from six employees to 250. By 1991, the company built a 250,000-square-foot (23,000 m^{2}) plant of brown marble and black glass on a hilltop 30 miles (48 km) north of San Diego.

After Upper Deck introduced its premium baseball series, other companies followed with improved photography, better design, and higher-quality paper stock. The sports card market grew from $50 million in 1980, when Topps' monopoly was broken by Fleer, to a $1.5 billion industry in 1992. Hall of Famer Reggie Jackson served as an adviser in the early 1990s. Jackson would also serve as the inspiration for the first certified autograph card inserted into trading cards with the company's "Find the Reggie" campaign. A successful promotion for the Upper Deck brand, the triple portrait of Jackson remains an iconic image among baseball card collectors.

Upper Deck introduced their "Young Guns" rookie car brand in the 1990–91 hockey set as a subset of rookie cards. The first Young Guns set contained 550 cards, which were split into two series: Low Series (#1-400) and High Series (#401-550). Featured players included NHL All-Stars such as Wayne Gretzky, Brett Hull, Mario Lemieux, Mark Messier, Patrick Roy, andSteve Yzerman.

At the beginning of the 1992–93 NHL season, Upper Deck made Patrick Roy a spokesperson. Roy was also a hockey card collector, with more than 150,000 cards. An ad campaign was launched, and it had an adverse effect on Roy's season. Upper Deck had a slogan called "Trade Roy", which was posted on billboards throughout the city of Montreal. A Journal de Montreal poll, published on January 13, 1993, indicated that 57% of fans favored trading Patrick Roy. Before the trade deadline, Canadiens general manager Serge Savard insisted he would consider a trade for Roy. The Canadiens ended the season by winning only 8 of their last 19 games.

In 1992, Upper Deck launched Upper Deck Authenticated (UDA), "a memorabilia division that offered hologram-verified autographed items directly from athletes". A year later, in 1993, the company released SP Baseball, "the first widely recognized super-premium card product".

Upper Deck was also the first to insert swatches of game-used material into cards when it made jersey cards in 1997 UD Basketball. The insert set was called Game Jersey and a similar set followed in baseball the next year, where Upper Deck cut up game-used jerseys of Ken Griffey Jr., Tony Gwynn, and Rey Ordóñez.

In 1999, Upper Deck Company spent over $1.1 million in acquiring vintage baseball memorabilia items at the Barry Halper Collection auction held at Sotheby's in New York City. One of the items was a Ty Cobb jersey that Upper Deck paid $332,500 for. As part of a sweepstakes prize, it gave the jersey to 14-year-old Robert Shell of Milwaukee. At the time, the estimated tax Shell was going to pay on the prize was $125,000. The amount, his mother said, would force the family to sell the jersey.

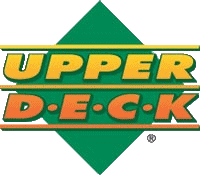
Previous Upper Deck logo used until early 2008

=== 2000s–2010s ===
In May 2005, Richard McWilliam was named the sports collectible industry's "most influential" person of the past 20 years at an annual trade convention in Hawaii. In addition to McWilliam's award, Upper Deck was recognized for the debut of its legendary 1989 baseball trading card set, which included the then 19-year-old centerfielder Ken Griffey Jr., as the "most influential" event of the past 20 years. The list of nominees was created and voted upon by the staff of conference organizers F+W Publications.

In July 2005, Upper Deck won the liquidation auction of former competitor Fleer-SkyBox International's brand name, assets, and business model, as well as the Fleer collectibles die-cast business assets. In March 2007, Upper Deck made an offer to buy competitor Topps, competing with Madison Dearborn Partners and Tornante Company, the eventual buyer.

Upper Deck originally included the year of the trading card set's release on its logo, with the "19" above "Upper" and the last two digits of the year under "Deck" (but both inside the green diamond). This practice was dropped midway through the 1994 season. In 2008, Upper Deck retired the green diamond logo and replaced it with a new design that it could better use to market all of its products.

In 2009, Upper Deck introduced the Diamond Club, where members consist of the top individual purchasers and collectors of Upper Deck and Fleer brands throughout the U.S., Canada, and Japan. Criteria were that the members distinguished themselves by the amount of money spent and how they helped promote these products within the hobby and to other collectors. Members receive special promotional items and invitations to special events and an annual summit where they can share ideas with members of Upper Deck. Fewer than 125 members are chosen to be a part of the program each year.

On August 6, 2009, MLB announced it entered into a multi-year deal with Topps, giving it exclusive rights to produce MLB trading cards. Upper Deck would retain its rights to produce cards bearing player likenesses via its contract with the Major League Baseball Players Association (MLBPA) but would be unable to use team logos or other trademarked images. On February 1, 2010, MLB filed a federal lawsuit against Upper Deck for trademark infringement. A mutual settlement was announced on March 3, 2010, stating that Upper Deck could continue selling its three current baseball card series (2009 Signature Stars, 2009 Ultimate Collection, and 2010 Upper Deck Series One), although they were prohibited from using any MLB trademarks, including team logos and names, in any future baseball products. Despite this limitation, Upper Deck commented that they would still continue to produce baseball-related cards without using those trademarks.

On September 29, 2009, Upper Deck created the company's first-ever packs of Finnish- and Swedish-language Victory hockey cards.

In February 2010, Blizzard Entertainment ended its licensing deal with Upper Deck, which had previously produced the World of Warcraft trading card game.

On April 7, 2010, Upper Deck announced it would no longer be licensed to produce NFL trading cards. Upper Deck spokesperson Terry Melia posted on Twitter that, "UD was unable to come to terms with NFL Properties. No NFL Properties-licensed football cards from UD in 2010." Upper Deck owner Richard McWilliam said, "Over the past year, Upper Deck has attempted to negotiate a new licensing deal with NFL Properties. Unfortunately, despite our best efforts, we were not able to reach agreeable terms, and therefore will not be issuing any NFL Properties-licensed trading cards for the 2010 season. Upper Deck will continue to focus on its exclusive license agreement with the Collegiate Licensing Company and co-exclusive agreements with NHL Enterprises and the NHL Players Association, as well as its multiple entertainment licenses."

In January 2013, after "the sudden and unexpected death" of McWilliam, Jason Masherah was named president of Upper Deck.

On January 8, 2015, Panini America acquired the Collegiate Licensing Company exclusive trading card agreement that Upper Deck formerly owned.

=== 2020s–present ===
In late-2022, Upper Deck President Jason Masherah said many of the company's brands had seen a steady 5%–10% growth since 2015. During the COVID-19 pandemic specifically, Masherah said Upper Deck "probably saw 2–3 [times] expansion of the secondary market as a lot of Gen X collectors took the time to go through their attics and rediscover their old collections".

In May 2025, Upper Deck introduced a new authentication feature to help reduce fraud and "patch swapping". Starting with the release of the 2023–24 Upper Deck The Cup Hockey set, Rookie Patch Auto cards would include a slabbed case including a serial number and a scannable QR code.

In December 2025, Upper Deck extended its partnerships with Hockey Canada, renewing their licensing agreement, which had been active since 2012. Also in December, it was announced that Upper Deck had signed a multi-year agreement as an official partner of USA Hockey. Upper Deck would release its first-ever USA Hockey trading card set, which included athletes like Cole Eiserman, James Hagens, Cole Hutson, and Taylor Heise.

In January 2026, it was announced that Upper Deck would begin producing NHL Debut Game Jersey cards. The cards, scheduled to be released in the summer of 2026, will be in 2025-26 Upper Deck Extended Series and include swatches of rookies' game-used jerseys. Also that month, Upper Deck reached an agreement with Warner Bros. Discovery, acquiring a license to produce Harry Potter collectibles.

In February 2026, Upper Deck celebrated the 25th anniversary of Upper Deck Golf. It released a 2026 Upper Deck Golf set headlined by Tiger Woods, referencing its iconic 2001 set, which featured Woods' rookie card. That same month, Upper Deck announced it had signed golfer and two-time major champion Nelly Korda to an exclusive deal. Korda would appear in Upper Deck's "Authenticated Memorabilia Collection" and on a Young Guns trading card. Also in February, Upper Deck released its first music-related trading cards, featuring American rock band Grateful Dead, with a 60th anniversary set called "Grateful Dead—60 Years So Far… A Visual Trip".

In April 2026, Upper Deck released its fourth and final DC x National Hockey League set, the DC x NHL "Secret Identity" crossover, which combines DC properties with 12 prominent NHL prospects, superstars, and legends.

=== DeWayne Buice ===
DeWayne Buice, then a California Angels pitcher, would later become one of Upper Deck's founding partners. In November 1987, Buice walked into The Upper Deck, a trading card store. Store owner Bill Hemrick noticed Buice and the two struck up a friendship, which led to Buice hosting an autograph session at the store. Within weeks, Buice became one of Hemrick's business partners. Hemrick and his partner Paul Sumner were in the process of starting Upper Deck. The two lacked the business and personal connections to help land the necessary Major League Baseball Players Association (MLBPA) license, which would allow Upper Deck to use players' names and likenesses on its cards. The only response they received was that MLBPA was not accepting another card company for three more years. Buice was told that if he could help secure the license, he would receive a 12% stake in the card company. Buice would become a key figure in getting MLBPA officials to agree to a meeting. By the end of the 1988 season, Hemrick and Sumner received the license, and 1989, they were making baseball cards.

By the time Buice retired from professional baseball at the end of the 1989 season, he had collected $2.8 million from Upper Deck. Believing the company owed him more money, Buice sued Upper Deck executives. Buice's stake in the company was settled in court, and he became a millionaire who reportedly made $17 million on the deal, far more than he ever made as a baseball player. In two-and-a-half seasons with the Angels, Buice made $212,500.

Upper Deck was originally scheduled to pay Buice over a four-year period, but due to the 1994 baseball strike, Upper Deck's business stalled. Buice then agreed to a six-year payment plan. Sales in 1995 and 1996 fell so far that for those two years, virtually all the company's profits went to Buice.

On the day in 1998 that Upper Deck cut Buice his final check, the company threw a party at its Carlsbad, California, headquarters. The top brass ordered employees to work a half day. Later that year at the Christmas party, Upper Deck CEO Richard McWilliam told employees the company's deal with Buice was the worst deal it had ever done.

=== 1989 set and Ken Griffey Jr. ===
In the 1989 Upper Deck baseball set, Ken Griffey Jr. was selected to be featured on card number one. A teenage employee named Tom Geideman was the one who suggested the use of Griffey Jr. as its choice for the number-one card. Traditionally, competitors like Topps had a system for reserving various numbers in their sets (such as numbers 1 and 100) for the biggest stars in the game. Geideman decided that a top prospect should be honored with the number one card in the inaugural 1989 set. After reviewing Baseball America, Geideman narrowed the list of candidates to four: Gregg Jefferies of the New York Mets, Gary Sheffield of the Milwaukee Brewers, Sandy Alomar Jr. of the San Diego Padres, and Griffey Jr. of the Seattle Mariners. Geideman was a Mariners fan and decided that Griffey Jr. should be the prospect featured on card number one of the 1989 set.

At press time, Griffey Jr. had not yet played a major league game, so Upper Deck used an image of him in a San Bernardino Spirit uniform. Competitors such as Score and Topps neglected to include a card of Griffey Jr. in their regular 1989 sets. Both brands would make a card of Griffey Jr. in their end of year Traded sets. Upper Deck's Griffey Jr. exclusivity gained exposure due to the popularity of Griffey Jr. in the 1989 MLB season.

Despite the popularity of the Griffey Jr. card, it was not a scarce card. The card was situated in the top left corner of the uncut sheets and was more liable to be cut poorly or have its corners dinged. Company policy was that if a customer found a damaged card in their package, the company would replace it. Many Griffey Jr. cards were returned, which resulted in Upper Deck printing many uncut sheets (consisting of 100 cards) of just the Griffey Jr. card. According to Professional Sports Authenticator (PSA), the Griffey Jr. card would become the most graded card of all time with the company; PSA graded over 50,000 of the cards. The Beckett Grading card service has evaluated over 25,000 of the Griffey Jr. rookie cards.

In September 2026, Sports Illustrated's Collectibles named the 1989 Ken Griffey Jr. #1 Star Rookie card, the 1989 Dale Murphy #357 Reverse Negative card, and the 1989 Randy Johnson #25 Star Rookie card the top three "most valuable and iconic 1989 Upper Deck baseball cards". The first-place Griffey Jr. card had sold for $6,215 at a PSA 10 Sale.

== High end sports cards and insert sets ==
=== Memorabilia and relic cards ===
In 1997, Upper Deck was the first trading card company to insert swatches of game-used material into cards. By 1999, "player-worn" cards were introduced, where jerseys came from promotional photo shoots. Upper Deck has changed its practice of using materials certified as "Worn" by the player depicted on the front of the card. The changed wording on the backs of Upper Deck insert cards makes it less clear as to how the materials were used or what player wore the item, for example:

- 1997 Rey Ordóñez card (back of card): "On the front of this card is an authentic piece of a game-worn jersey from an official 1996 Major League Baseball game. This swatch is from a jersey worn by Rey Ordonez."
- 2008–09 Kevin Garnett card (back of card): "On the front of this card is a piece of memorabilia that has been certified to us as having been used by Kevin Garnett as a member of the Minnesota Timberwolves in an NBA game."

Until the 2008–09 season, Upper Deck guaranteed its patches were "game-used by the player featured on the card", although these guarantees became increasingly vague. Upper Deck's authenticity has been questioned in regards to players' jersey and uniform materials, but with no real founding. Upper Deck has distanced itself from patch certification. Instead, the cards state that the inserted items are known to Upper Deck to have been used or worn, and authenticity is certified by third-party memorabilia vendors for the card company. Some of Upper Deck's jersey materials are harvested at events like rookie photo shoots, such as the NHLPA Rookie Showcase, during which players wear uniforms to generate event-worn material that never sees the field of play. Collectors still debate and question the authenticity of such "memorabilia", which often includes items manufactured specifically for insert cards, patches, and other desirable content.

For its 2024–25 Ultimate Collection Hockey mail-in program, Upper Deck issued a statement that certain Jersey and Patch cards were eligible for replacement (from March to December 2026) due to "inaccurate authentication copy".

In January 2026, it was reported that Upper Deck was collaborating the NHL and NHLPA to collect "jerseys worn by top NHL rookies in their debut games" to create swatches for trading cards as part of 2025–26 Upper Deck Extended Series. These Debut Game Jersey cards would have a certificate of authenticity and "a photo-matched image of the player from their first professional game, as well as a piece of the jersey they wore during that game".

=== NBA Exquisite Collection ===
Upper Deck premiered its NBA Exquisite Collection line in the 2003–2004 season. Each pack contained five basketball cards; one veteran base card numbered to 225, one autographed rookie card featuring a piece of patch worn by the player numbered to 99 or 225, one game worn jersey card, one autographed/patch insert card, and a fifth card that was either a low numbered parallel or an additional autographed patch card. Suggested retail price of the product was $500, making it the most expensive basketball card product ever produced at the time. Autograph cards include veterans such as Michael Jordan, Kobe Bryant, Kevin Garnett, LeBron James, Dwyane Wade, and Carmelo Anthony. The most sought after cards from the line include the autographed/patch rookie cards numbered to 99 (LeBron James, Darko Milicic, Carmelo Anthony, Chris Bosh, Dwyane Wade, and Udonis Haslem), the Limited Logos inserts which feature an extra large jersey patch piece and autograph, and the autographed/patch rookie parallels serial numbered to the player's jersey number. By 2024, Upper Deck's Exquisite Collection had become highly coveted, with specific cards valued from $30,000 to $800,000 for a Fanatics Collect and Sotheby's auction.

=== Other Exquisite Collection series ===
In view of the Exquisite series' success, the company released 2004–05 and 2005–06 basketball sets, a 2005 football line, and an analogous 2005–06 hockey line called The Cup. The football line, which includes autographed rookie "patch" cards, is the most popular of the series. Variants of these cards, called the Gold Series, are limited to runs of 25 or 99 cards. The company's Exquisite-branded baseball series were introduced first as premiums in lower-end Upper Deck products (including the company's SP Legendary Cuts and Artifacts Baseball lines). In 2007, the company added another line to its Exquisite Collections brand, focused on rookie players.

=== Yankee Stadium Legacy ===
The Yankee Stadium Legacy set is a 6,742-card compilation chronicling every game ever played at Yankee Stadium. The card set made its official debut in random packs of Upper Deck's 2008 Series 1 Baseball. Cards in the set commemorate famous sporting events that took place at Yankee Stadium, including Lou Gehrig's "Luckiest Man Alive" Speech (1939), Babe Ruth's "Final Visit to Yankee Stadium" (1948), Joe Louis versus Max Schmeling heavyweight title bout (1936), and Muhammad Ali's title defense against Ken Norton (1976).

Guinness World Records stated an intention to certify the Yankee Stadium Legacy Set as the largest baseball card set ever produced, but the official recognition would take place after all of the 6,500 cards were released.

The Yankee Stadium Legacy cards were inserted into various sets: Spectrum, Piece of History, SPx, Upper Deck Series Two, SP Legendary Cuts (hobby-only), SP Authentic, UDx, and UD Masterpieces. Upper Deck started a website so collectors could learn more about the Yankee Stadium Legacy set. Alphanumeric codes found on the backs of cards could be entered at the site, and collectors would be able to use the site to manage their collections online, and track their collections against other collectors via a leader board.

Tommy Baxter, a 36-year-old from Little Rock, Arkansas, was the first collector to put together Upper Deck's Yankee Stadium Legacy (YSL) Collection.

=== NHL Biography of a Season ===
The NHL Biography of a Season was a 30-card set capturing the greatest moments of the 2008-09 NHL Season. The cards were available through Upper Deck Certified Diamond Dealers. A collector had to redeem five wrappers of 2008/2009 Upper Deck hockey cards at a participating hobby store and receive an exclusive Upper Deck Biography of a Season card. One new card was available every week throughout the NHL season. The first five cards were:

- Alexander Ovechkin — NHL single-season record 65 goals by LW
- Henrik Zetterberg — 2008 Conn Smythe winner
- Detroit Red Wings — Stanley Cup team photo
- Steven Stamkos — First overall pick in 2008 Draft
- Fabian Brunstrom — Hat trick in NHL debut

=== 20th Anniversary Retrospective set ===
For its 20th anniversary in 2009, Upper Deck released a set that could be found in its 2009 baseball trading card releases. The massive 2,500 card set commemorated the previous 20 years in sports, pop culture, politics, world history, and technology. The first cards from the 20th Anniversary Retrospective set were found in 2009 Upper Deck Series One Baseball. An additional element, the 100-card memorabilia set, was found in all sets beginning with 2009 Upper Deck Spectrum Baseball.

=== NBA Michael Jordan Legacy ===
In April 2009, the company announcement that longtime company spokesman Michael Jordan would be honored with a 1,170-card tribute insert set chronicling every Chicago Bulls game Jordan played in. The set began with his NBA debut on October 26, 1984, through his final Bulls appearance in Game 6 of the NBA Finals on June 14, 1998. The 1,170-card set released across four 2009 Upper Deck basketball products: Lineage, Radiance, Upper Deck, and First Edition. Each of the cards included Jordan's specific box score stats from the game in question, including regular-season and playoff games. The cards would fall, on average, 1:4 packs across all four brands.

In addition to the 1,170 Jordan game cards, Upper Deck also included 100 different game-used memorabilia cards, each one crash-numbered to 23 (Jordan's number). The cards had swatches from Jordan's game-worn jerseys. Over 100 different action photos showing Jordan through the years were used for card front photography.

=== Top-selling cards ===
Several Upper Deck trading cards have sold for hundreds of thousands and millions of dollars at auction:

- In early-2020, a card featuring Michael Jordan and LeBron James 2003–04 Exquisite Collection All-NBA Access Press Patches sold for $900,000 in a private transaction brokered via Goldin Auctions.
- In July 2020, a James 2003–04 Exquisite Collection Rookie Patch Autograph card sold at Goldin Auctions for $1.8 million.
- In April 2021, a 2003–04 Exquisite Collection James Rookie Patch Autograph card sold for $5.2 million.
- In late-2021, an autographed 1997–98 Game Jersey Jordan card sold privately via Goldin Auctions for $2.7 million.
- In mid-2024, a 1-of-1 numbered, on-card autographed Jordan Logoman from the 2003–04 Ultimate Collection sold for $2.9 million, setting a record for that time.
- In September 2024, at a Fanatics and Sotheby inaugural "Holy Grails" auction, a 2000 Upper Deck SP Authentic Tom Brady Rookie Autograph card—once owned by Brady—sold for $192,000. A 2003–04 James Exquisite Collection Rookie Patch sold for $432,000, and a 2005–06 Exquisite Collection Autograph Patch James card sold for $576,000, breaking the record for a 2005 James card.
- In April 2026, an on-card autographed 1997–98 Game Jersey Jordan card, with a jersey swatch from the 1992 NBA All-Star Game, sold for $4.25 million, marking the most paid for a solo Jordan card.

=== Find the Heroes ===
The success of the "Find the Reggie" promotion led Upper Deck to expand its certified autograph insert program across multiple sports from 1990 to 1993. Twelve sets, known collectively as the Upper Deck Heroes, established the first systematic use of individually hand-signed, serially numbered autograph cards in the hobby. Nine of the twelve sets were randomly inserted into High Series or Low Series retail and hobby packs, with no external indication that a pack contained a signed card. Wayne Gretzky (hockey), Walter Payton (football), and Dan Marino (football) were instead sold as factory-assembled framed boxed sets by the newly launched Upper Deck Authenticated (UDA) division and were never inserted into packs.

The baseball portion of the program featured five sets. The inaugural 1990 set honored Reggie Jackson; subsequent sets featured Nolan Ryan and Hank Aaron (both 1991), Ted Williams (1992), and a dual-signed set featuring Johnny Bench and Joe Morgan honoring the Cincinnati Reds' "Big Red Machine" era (1992). The basketball series consisted of a single set featuring Jerry West (1991–92). The hockey component included sets for Brett Hull (1991–92) and Wayne Gretzky (1992–93). Football subjects comprised four sets: Joe Montana and Joe Namath (both 1991), and Walter Payton and Dan Marino (both 1992).

Sport	Subject	Year	Distribution	Print run
Baseball	Reggie Jackson	1990	High Series packs	2,500
Baseball	Nolan Ryan	1991	Low Series packs	2,500
Baseball	Hank Aaron	1991	High Series packs	2,500
Baseball	Ted Williams	1992	Low Series packs	2,500
Baseball	Johnny Bench & Joe Morgan	1992	High Series packs	2,500
Basketball	Jerry West	1991–92	High Series packs	2,500
Hockey	Brett Hull	1991–92	Low Series packs	2,500
Hockey	Wayne Gretzky	1992–93	UDA boxed set	2,800
Football	Joe Montana	1991	Low Series packs	2,500
Football	Joe Namath	1991	High Series packs	2,500
Football	Walter Payton	1992	UDA boxed set	2,800
Football	Dan Marino	1992	UDA boxed set	2,800

The nine pack-inserted sets were serial-numbered to 2,500, and the three UDA sets were numbered to 2,800. Each autographed Heroes card was authenticated with an Upper Deck diamond hologram on the reverse, distinguishing it from unsigned parallel insert versions of the same design which had a different hologram. A community site tracking reported sightings of all twelve sets across their serial numbers is maintained by collectors at Find the Heroes.

== Acquired brands ==
=== Konami ===
Upper Deck acquired the rights to distribute the Yu-Gi-Oh! Trading Card Game from Konami in 2002. That same year, second quarter American sales reached $17 million.

In October 2008, Konami sued Vintage Sports Cards for distributing Yu-Gi-Oh! Trading Game Cards, along with counterfeit cards. The cards were found in a Los Angeles Toys-R-Us. Vintage denied any wrongdoing, claiming they legally obtained all cards (counterfeits included) directly from Upper Deck. Konami added Upper Deck as a defendant on December 11. In December 2008, Konami announced they were assuming full control over Yu-Gi-Oh! TCG, which included distribution and customer support. In response, Upper Deck filed a $75 million suit against Konami in Nevada District Court.

In a January 26, 2009 press release, Upper Deck denied allegations of counterfeiting and stated it would support the Yu-Gi-Oh! community in an upcoming event. On February 26, 2009, Upper Deck was ordered to cease distribution of Yu-Gi-Oh! products, use of Konami's trademarks, and promotion of itself as an authorized distributor or rights-holder to Yu-Gi-Oh!.

On January 10, 2010, Judge Valerie Baker Fairbank ruled in a U.S. District Court that Upper Deck had counterfeited the cards, and threw out Upper Deck's countersuit alleging breach of the distribution agreement. The next stage of the case began on January 26, 2010, where a jury was to decide whether Upper Deck was liable for counterfeiting the cards. During the opening statement for the defense, Upper Deck's attorney, Richard Howell of Rutan & Tucker stated "The behavior is still undeniably wrong. And I am in here, as counsel for the two defendants, asking you to hold my clients accountable for that behavior; asking you to hold my clients responsible for this conduct that there is no dispute, and there was no disputing even before this case started today, that it was wrong." After the second day of proceedings, Konami and Upper Deck reached an out-of-court settlement. The terms were not publicly disclosed.

=== Maxx racing cards ===
Maxx produced racing cards from 1988 to 1996. Upper Deck started producing racing cards in 1995, acquired the Maxx brand in December 1996, and discontinued the line after the 2000 set.

=== O-Pee-Chee ===
Upper Deck became licensor of the O-Pee-Chee brand in 2007, after the original Canadian company was sold to Nestlé in 1996. O-Pee-Chee's collections of baseball and ice hockey cards had been commercialized by Topps from 1997 to 2004. Since Upper Deck succeeded Topps as licensor, it has released several collections up to the present day.

== Other brands ==
=== Upper Deck Entertainment ===
Upper Deck Entertainment (UDE), a division of The Upper Deck Company, used to produce the English, Spanish, Portuguese, German, Italian, and French versions of the Yu-Gi-Oh! Trading Card Game, a collectible card game, licensed from Konami. Other collectible card games have included the Winx Club trading card game for girls, which has since been canceled, the World of Warcraft Trading Card Game based on the popular MMORPG. UDE lost this license, which it had since 2006, in early 2010. The Marvel Trading Card Game and the DC Comics Trading Card Game, using their proprietary VS System, was canceled in early 2009. It has since been relaunched as VS. System 2PCG. In 2006, UDE introduced a trading card game based on Nickelodeon's Avatar: The Last Airbender series and the Pirates of the Caribbean films. It has also released many non-game oriented sports-based and multimedia companion trading card sets.

The entertainment department was all but dissolved in March 2010, citing layoffs of more than 110 employees. After about a year of hibernation, the entertainment department began to rebuild and regained traction in board gaming with the release of Legendary: A Marvel Deck Building Game, earning industry awards and securing large scale mass market placement. In 2017, the department entered the mobile game market with Legendary: DXP.

=== Upper Deck Digital ===
Upper Deck Digital technology includes the PenCam™, a pen with a small camera that digitally records autographs. Launched in 2001, it is an authentication system in which PenCam-signed memorabilia includes a CD-ROM with details about the signing: a time and date stamped video record of the signature, a certificate of authenticity, and more.

In 2016, Upper Deck introduced ePack, a digital trading card system where "consumers buy digital tokens representing unique physical items that are maintained in a secure facility by Upper Deck" through a collaboration with COMC.com (Check Out My Cards.com). The first product released through the e-Pack platform was Series 1 Hockey. By the summer of 2022, the company extended ePack to toys and comics with a program called Collect Forever.

In October 2021, Upper Deck extended its exclusive deal with the NHL and NHLPA, part of which included rights and licensing to make non-fungible token (NFT) trading cards.

In October 2026, Upper Deck announced "Moments" cards, which allow fans to get a trading card from an NHL game in real time, via its existing e-Pack infrastructure.

=== Upper Deck International ===
In 1991, Upper Deck introduced its products to the global marketplace with Upper Deck International, headquartered in the Netherlands. With an office in Amsterdam and distribution throughout Europe, Asia, and India, the company marketed and sold toys, games, and collectibles geared to local consumers.

In addition to EMEA, Upper Deck International was responsible for Oceania, Japan, and Latin America. With offices in Berlin, Paris, London, Milan, Tokyo, Sydney, and São Paulo, the company was optimally organized for distribution across the globe. Upper Deck International lost the Yu-Gi-Oh license as well in 2009.

In 2012, Upper Deck International declared bankruptcy. Before the start of its insolvency case, Upper Deck International went into a sales agreement with Hasbro Inc. for some of its assets.

=== Upper Deck Kids ===
In April 2006, Upper Deck created Upper Deck Kids with the slogan "Get More Than Lucky." Kids could enter codes printed on the back of cards on the website to get points, which they could redeem for prizes. In April 2007, Upper Deck instituted a monthly limit of 1,000 codes, and adults became ineligible to sign up. New rewards were usually added weekly. Prizes included autographed memorabilia, sports card boxes, screensavers, desktop wallpapers, video games, and systems, among others. Each prize was worth a different amount. Upper Deck Kids also had message boards where kids can talk about sports, trade codes, gossip, etc. Also, Upper Deck implemented a limit on how many invalid codes one could enter due to multiple hackers that wrote code-cracking programs to guess all the possible codes and take all the prizes for themselves. Also, Upper Deck announced that children would no longer be able to redeem Upper Deck product codes from 2006 for points on the kids' website to avoid "code sharing" amongst members. Trading of codes also took place on the website. Also, to encourage kids to buy the most recent Upper Deck products, codes from the backs of cards older than six months were worth half of their original rewards points value.

== Trading cards ==
=== Sports ===
Upper Deck has covered a wide range of sports through its trading cards collections, currently focusing on few of them. Some of the collections released by the company include:

Sport	Licenses
American football	USA Football, Canadian Football League, USFL, XFL
Auto racing	NASCAR, 23XI Racing
Baseball	Major League Baseball
Basketball	EuroLeague
Boxing	Individual boxers
Golf	PGA Tour
Ice hockey (Note: Includes collections of the O-Pee-Chee brand)	National Hockey League, Canadian Hockey League, American Hockey League, Team Canada Juniors
Lacrosse	Major League Lacrosse
Professional wrestling	All Elite Wrestling
Rugby union	Individual players
Soccer	Major League Soccer, FIFA (Note: Started with the 1994 World Cup held in the United States)
Volleyball	Individual indoor and beach volleyball players

=== Non-sports ===
Group	Licenses
Artists	Christina Aguilera, Ricky Martin
Comics	Avengers Assemble!, Deadpool, Marvel Comics
Games	World of Warcraft
Movies	Avengers: Age of Ultron, Avengers: Infinity War, Alien, Guardians of the Galaxy, James Bond 007, Space Jam, Spider-Man 2
Miscellaneous	GrossOut
TV programs	American Idol, X-Files, Dinosaur King

== Lawsuits ==
Under the executive direction of McWilliam, Upper Deck became known as a litigious company. Stars like Mickey Mantle, Kareem Abdul-Jabbar and Ted Williams, Upper Deck employees, vendors and even licensors were forced to the courts to settle simple disputes with McWilliam. Pelton & Associates successfully froze all of Upper Deck's product shipments after they proved to the court that they actually owned the custom logos, designs and packaging and that Upper Deck had not paid them.

- Konami — In 2010, after Upper Deck admitted to counterfeiting cards, the lawsuit was settled out of court.
- MLB — In 2010, MLB filed a federal lawsuit in New York against Upper Deck, accusing the company of trademark infringement and illegally selling cards that feature official team logos and uniforms. The complaint noted that Upper Deck owed MLB $2.4 million.
- BreaKey International — A partial summary judgment was ordered on the December 22, 2004 but was denied, a second partial summary judgment happened on September 29, 2005.
- Buzz Marketing — Upper Deck faced a May 6, 2004 lawsuit relating to the marketing of BreaKey.
- Kareem Abdul-Jabbar — Upper Deck used six photos of Abdul-Jabbar during his college years without permission. The photos were part of a trading card series called "Greats of the Game," which also had Abdul-Jabbar's name and signature. "Abdul-Jabbar never authorized the production of the cards," the suit read "... Upper Deck was fully aware that Abdul-Jabbar had never authorized Upper Deck to use his photograph, name and signature for college-themed cards, and Abdul-Jabbar had previously rejected Upper Deck's request for such authorization."
- J&T Hobby — In 2012, J&T Hobby and President Joe Pirozzi filed a lawsuit against Upper Deck and McWilliam for alleged "fraud, concealment, conspiracy, breach of good faith and unfair and deceptive business practices".

=== American International Specialty Lines Insurance Company ===
This case arose out of an insurance policy Upper Deck purchased from American International Specialty Lines Insurance Company (AISLIC). The policy insured a tax strategy that KPMG, an accounting firm, developed for Upper Deck. The IRS investigated the tax strategy and determined it constituted an improper tax shelter. Upper Deck settled with the IRS for $80 million in back taxes and interest, and with the California Franchise Tax Board for $17 million in back taxes and interest.

After AISLIC rejected Upper Deck's claim that the policy covered the loss incurred as a result of the settlement, Upper Deck and McWilliam filed a complaint in the U.S. District Court for the Southern District of California seeking, inter alia, a declaratory judgment that the policy issued by AISLIC covered the loss. Subsequently, the district court granted AISLIC's motion to compel arbitration. A three-member panel of arbitrators held that Upper Deck was not entitled to coverage because it had abandoned the tax strategy AISLIC had insured. The district court confirmed the arbitration award.

== See also ==
- Razor Entertainment
- Topps
- Topps baseball card products
