= Bubble gum =

Type of chewing gum

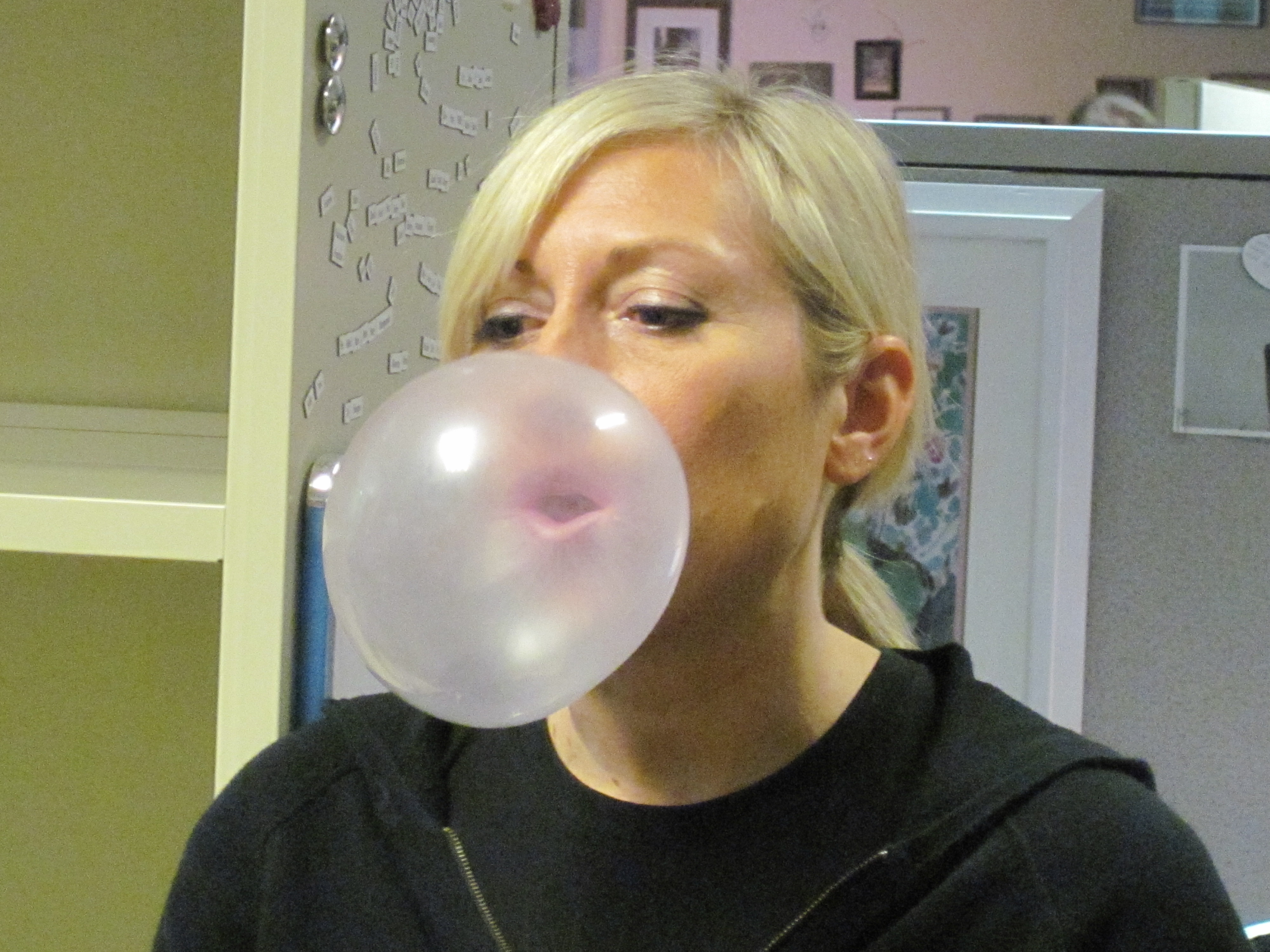
- Woman blowing a bubble
- Type: Chewing gum
- Place of origin: United States
- Created by: Walter Diemer
- Invented: 1928; 98 years ago

Bubble gum (or bubblegum) is a type of chewing gum, designed to be inflated out of the mouth as a bubble.

== Composition ==
In modern chewing gum, if natural rubber such as chicle is used, it must pass several purity and cleanliness tests. However, most modern types of chewing gum use synthetic gum-based materials and chemicals such as sugar and artificial flavoring chemicals. These materials allow for longer lasting flavor, a softer texture, and a reduction in tackiness. Polyol and Xylitol are two carbohydrate sugars that are used in the production of bubble gum and chewing gum. Rubbers are one additive that are in both bubble gum and chewing gum; however, the components of the rubber in the bubble gum are larger in mass than in chewing gum.

== Mechanical properties ==
As a sort of chewing gum consisting of long-chain polysaccharides, bubblegum can typically exhibit linear and nonlinear viscoelastic behaviors. Therefore, the distinct deformations under chewing can be affected by shear rate, shear strain, and shear stress applied through the teeth. Based on these, it is helpful to characterize the intrinsic rheological properties of chewing gums for future improvement and optimization of commercial products' texture and chewiness.

The linear viscoelastic (LVE) property can be probed on pre-shaped gum cuds through a small isothermal strain deformation (i.e., below yield strain) under small amplitude oscillatory shear (SAOS). Here the critical yield strain is defined as the modulus deviating about 10% from its initial value. Under it, gum cuds show elastic deformation that follows power-law behavior as a critical gel in the linear regime and plasticity.

The former demonstrates that the fractional recovery, defined as the ratio between measured strain after deformation and recovered strain without adding shear stress, for chewing gums under moderate shear stress (~ 1000 Pa) is between 25% and 40%. This relatively high fractional recovery (the ability to recover its previous shape) is consistent with providing a satisfying sensory feel. On the contrary, bubble gums show fractional recovery of less than 15%. Therefore, bubble gums can withstand more substantial stresses before break-up than normal chewing gums. This distinction is mainly due to its on-purpose design, which allows it to form and maintain large, stable bubbles when blown up through sizeable shear stress on the tongue.

The different values of Hencky strain rates can lead to either extensional viscosity plateaus before sagging (macroscopic failure) or necking (strain hardening) following a low/high strain rate. Typically, the strain softening at a low strain rate manifests the disintegration of brittle networks within gums. In contrast, the nonuniform deformation of polymers and crystallization induced by strain explain the strain hardening behavior at a high strain rate.

Bubble gum exhibits viscoelastic properties characteristic of polymeric elastomers, allowing it to undergo large reversible deformations under stress. Rheological studies show that bubble gum behaves as a "critical gel" with nonlinear strain hardening during extensional flow, meaning its resistance increases as it is stretched. Compared to standard chewing gum, bubble gum demonstrates greater resistance to tensile deformation and higher stress at break, enabling the formation of stable air bubbles before rupture. These properties arise from its long-chain polymer network structure, which provides both elasticity and resistance to flow under mechanical stress.

== History ==
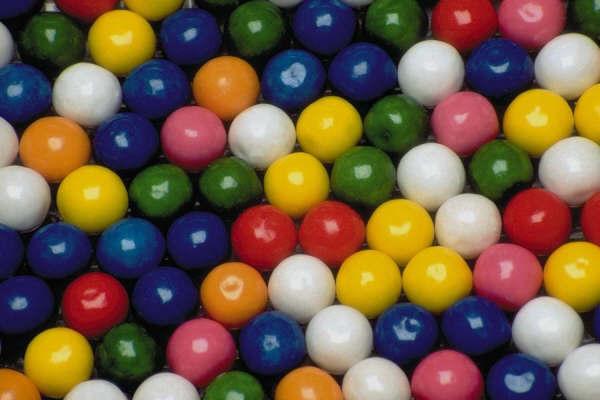
Various colors of bubble gum balls

Mexico was a top contributor in producing chicle, a natural rubber found in the Sapodilla tree, and chewing gum, but they did not address the full production of chicle. In the 1860s, the introduction of chewing gum began with Santa Anna, the former president of Mexico, and Thomas Adams, an American inventor. Adams brought a large amount of chicle from Santa Anna in regards to using it as a substitute for tires. When his invention failed, he recalled that people in Mexico chewed chicle. He added flavors to chicle, such as black liquorice and he successfully mass-produced the product.

Dr. E. E. Beeman was a pharmacist who made pepsin gum, which he advertised to help with heartburn in 1890. He made Pepsin with a pig as the logo- which was on the original bottle that he tried to sell- and then added it to chewing gum to make it a pharmaceutical.

In 1928, Walter Diemer, an accountant for the Fleer Chewing Gum Company in Philadelphia, was experimenting with new gum recipes. One recipe, based on a formula for a chewing gum called "Blibber-Blubber", was found to be less sticky than regular chewing gum and stretched more easily. This type of non-sticky gum became highly successful and was eventually named by the president of Fleer as Dubble Bubble because of its stretchy texture. The Wrigley gum company was producing chewing gum while its competitors in America were producing bubble gum.

Bubble gum got its distinctive pink color because the original recipe Diemer worked on produced a dingy gray colored gum, so he added red dye (diluted to pink), as that was the only dye he had on hand at the time.

The Wrigley gum company first started marketing bubble gum for medical purposes; it was made to help with bad breath and as a stress reducer. They moved marketing practices in the 1930s to advertise it as childhood nostalgia representation. They wanted people who tasted the gum to be transported back to childhood memories. Wrigley appealed to children's nursery rhymes and marketing campaigns promoting that gum wasn't targeted for children to help boost their products.

The reason that Bazooka Bubble Gum gained traction after World War II was because the United States colors being used for packaging and the cheap production, which brought in millions of revenue after the U.S. winning the war.

Until the 1970s, bubble gum still tended to stick to one's face as a bubble popped. At that time, synthetic bubble gum was introduced, which would almost never stick. The first brands in the US to use these new synthetic gum bases were Hubba Bubba and Bubble Yum.

Chewing gum was only discussed in children's literature, and not among historical scholarly works. The retention of bubble gum manufacturing in Britain increased starting in 1978, along with chewing gum.

== Bubble gum flavors ==
In taste tests, children tend to prefer strawberry and blue raspberry flavors, rejecting more complex flavors, as they say these make them want to swallow the gum rather than continue chewing.

While there is a bubble gum "flavor" – which various artificial flavorings including esters are mixed to obtain – it varies from one company to another. Esters used in synthetic bubble gum flavoring may include methyl salicylate, ethyl butyrate, benzyl acetate, amyl acetate or cinnamic aldehyde. A natural bubble gum flavoring can be produced by combining banana, pineapple, cinnamon, cloves, and wintergreen. Vanilla, cherry, lemon, and orange oil have also been suggested as ingredients.

Bubble gum is produced in a wide range of flavors, most commonly sweet and fruit-based varieties such as strawberry, watermelon, and grape. In addition to these, manufacturers have developed a distinctive "bubble gum flavor," which does not correspond to a single natural source but instead consists of a blend of artificial flavoring compounds, often including esters such as ethyl butyrate and benzyl acetate. Flavor perception in chewing gum results from the release of both water-soluble and hydrophobic compounds during mastication, with intensity decreasing over time as these components dissolve in saliva.

== Records ==
In 1994, Susan Montgomery Williams of Fresno, California, set the Guinness World Record for largest bubble gum bubble ever blown, using her hands to help shape the bubble, which was 23 inches (58 cm) in diameter. However, Chad Fell holds the record for "Largest Hands-free Bubblegum Bubble" at 20 inches (51 cm), achieved on 24 April 2004.

The company Topps added trading cards with the packs of bubble gum in the early 1950s, which assisted the production and purchases of their gum. Sy Berger mentioned that he and his company only wanted to sell the gum, but since the trading cards were bringing in a higher profit than before, he had to keep selling them.

== Tourism ==
Bubblegum Alley is a tourist attraction in downtown San Luis Obispo, California, known for its accumulation of used bubble gum on the walls of an alley.

The Market Theater Gum Wall is a brick wall covered in used chewing gum, located in an alleyway in Post Alley under Pike Place Market in Downtown Seattle.

Bubble gum has been incorporated into niche tourism experiences, particularly through confectionery museums, novelty attractions, and urban art installations. The Seattle Gum Wall has become a popular tourist site, where visitors add chewed gum to a brick wall in an informal public art tradition. More broadly, candy and confectionery museums in the United States often include exhibits detailing the history of bubble gum and its cultural impact in the 20th century.

Chewing gum has been described in academic literature as a culturally significant commodity embedded in systems of mass consumption and identity formation, particularly in the United States, where it has been associated with modern consumer culture and global branding. This cultural visibility has contributed to its inclusion in niche tourism contexts, including confectionery exhibits and urban landmarks associated with public participation and material culture.

== See also ==
- Functional chewing gum
- Gumball machine
- Gum base
- Chewing gum industry
- Inca Kola
- List of chewing gum brands
