= Parallel card =

Parallel card could mean:

- An insert card mostly identical to another card in the same trading card series
- Parallel port expansion card in a computer
