= Patrick Kane =

American ice hockey player (born 1988)

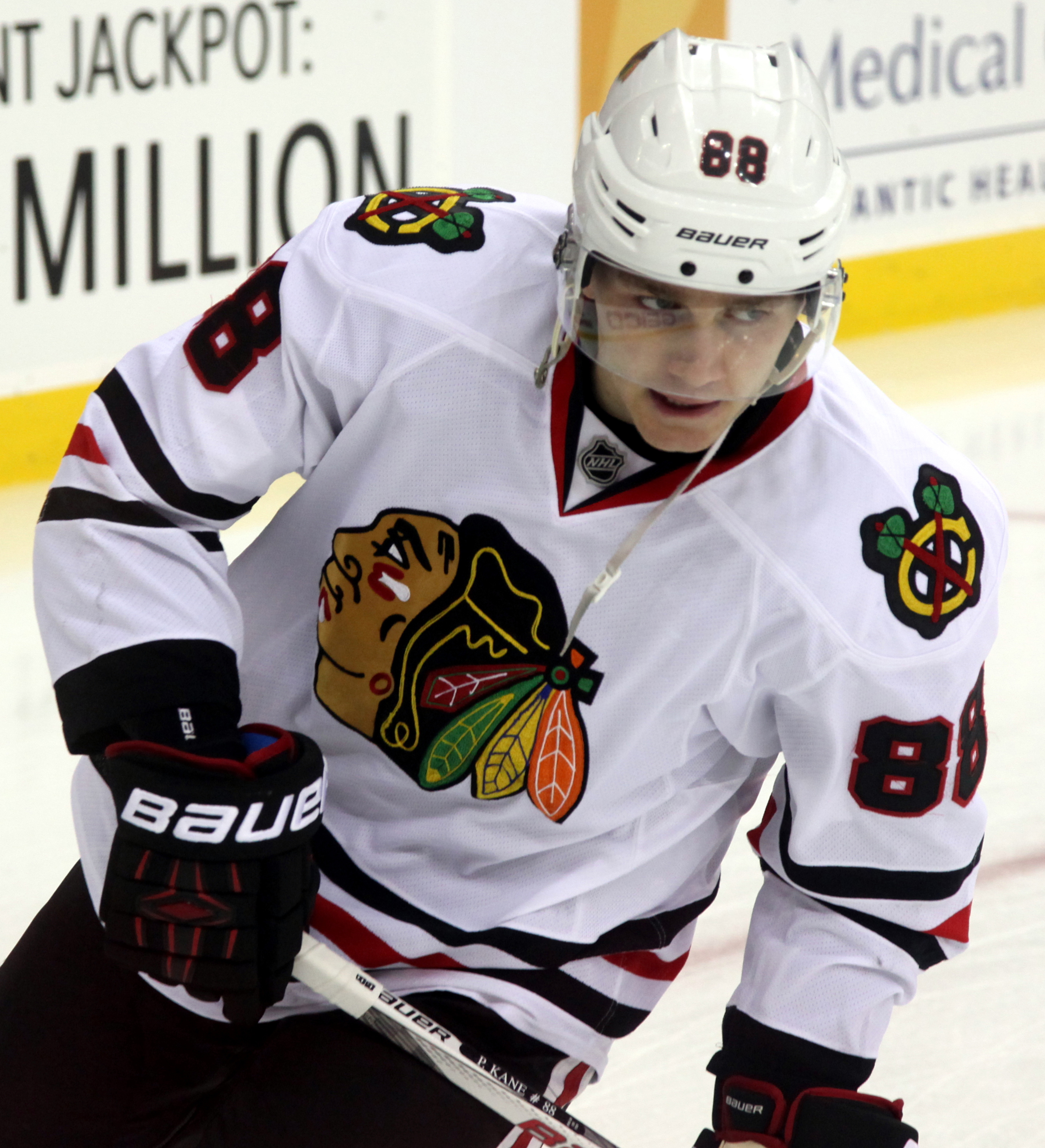
- Kane with the Chicago Blackhawks in December 2014
- Born: November 19, 1988 (age 38) Buffalo, New York, U.S.
- Height: 5 ft 10 in (178 cm)
- Weight: 177 lb (80 kg; 12 st 9 lb)
- Position: Right wing
- Shoots: Left
- NHL team Former teams: Chicago Blackhawks; EHC Biel; New York Rangers; Detroit Red Wings
- National team: United States
- NHL draft: 1st overall, 2007; Chicago Blackhawks
- Playing career: 2007–present

Patrick Timothy Kane II (born November 19, 1988) is an American professional ice hockey player who is a right winger and alternate captain for the Chicago Blackhawks of the National Hockey League (NHL). Nicknamed "Showtime", he was selected by the Blackhawks with the first overall pick in the 2007 NHL entry draft and initially played for them until February 2023, when he was traded to the New York Rangers. He has also played for the Detroit Red Wings. Kane has represented the United States at the 2010 and 2014 Winter Olympics.

Kane established himself as one of the most productive and decorated players of his era. He won the 2008 Calder Memorial Trophy for NHL's rookie of the year and played a crucial role in the Blackhawks' three championships in 2010, 2013 and 2015. Kane's notable achievements include winning the Conn Smythe Trophy as the most valuable player of the playoffs in 2013, and later becoming the first American-born player to secure the Hart Memorial Trophy as the most valuable player and the Art Ross Trophy as the scoring champion in the 2015–16 NHL season.

Kane led all NHL players in scoring during the 2010s and was later named as one of the 100 Greatest NHL Players. He is considered one of the best American players of all time. Kane became the youngest American player to reach 1,000 career regular season points in 2020, and holds the record for the most career points and career assists by an American-born player.

== Early life ==
Patrick Kane was born to Donna and Patrick "Tiki" Kane in Buffalo, New York. Kane developed an early interest in hockey. His father was a season ticket holder for the Buffalo Sabres, and frequently took his family to games. Kane was inadvertently featured in the background of Sylvain Turgeon's 1994–95 Pinnacle trading card while attending a Sabres' game as a child with his father. Kane's favorite players while growing up were Pat Lafontaine and Joe Sakic. In addition to hockey, he played baseball, soccer, lacrosse, and basketball in grade and middle school.

Kane began playing hockey when he was seven years old. His father allowed Kane to practice stick-handling and shooting in their house's basement, going as far as to set up a miniature rink that featured nets and boards. Kane attended a training camp hosted by Darryl Belfry, and credits Belfry for helping develop his vision and play-making abilities.

== Playing career ==
=== Minor and junior ===
Kane played for the Buffalo Saints 14U AAA hockey club. Donnie Harkins, the head coach of the Honeybaked 16U AAA hockey club, personally recruited Kane to join his team in Michigan after watching him play in a tournament. At the age of 14, Kane relocated to Detroit, Michigan, to play for Honeybaked during the 2003–04 season. He resided with former NHL player Pat Verbeek while living in Detroit, whom Kane regards as a mentor and one of his primary reasons for relocating. Honeybaked posted a 66–3–1 record that season, with Kane tallying 83 goals and 77 assists.

His success caught the attention of the London Knights, who drafted him in the fifth round, 88th overall, of the 2004 Ontario Hockey League (OHL) Midget Draft. Kane did not join the team and instead played for the United States National Team Development Program (NTDP), which was based in Michigan. The US NTDP was initially hesitant to recruit Kane based on his short stature, describing him in a scouting report as, "a little meek—and still has the body of a 12-year-old". Kane spent the next two years playing for the US NTDP, where he was given the chance to train and play a bigger role on a more frequent basis. He reflected on the US NTDP by commenting, "The program really focuses on improving your body, you get a lot of practice time and you really learn how to play the game and how to treat yourself." He led the team in scoring with 102 points during the 2005–06 season, surpassing the previous record holder, Phil Kessel.

Kane joined the London Knights for the 2006–07 OHL season. He skated on a line with future NHL forwards Sergei Kostitsyn and Sam Gagner. Kane appeared in 58 games for Knights, where he recorded 62 goals and 83 assists, while combining with his linemates for 394 points. He accrued an additional 31 points in 16 playoff games as the Knights lost to the Plymouth Whalers in the OHL's Western Conference final. Kane won the Emms Family Award for the OHL rookie of the year, and was the runner-up to John Tavares for the Red Tilson Trophy as league MVP. Kane also won the Canadian Hockey League's (CHL) Top Prospect and Top Scorer awards. His 145 points is the fifth most for a rookie in CHL history. The Knights later retired Kane's No. 88 jersey on January 17, 2020.

=== Professional ===
==== Chicago Blackhawks (2007–2023) ====
Heading into the 2007 NHL entry draft, Kane was ranked second among North American prospects by the NHL Central Scouting Bureau and was chosen first overall by the Chicago Blackhawks. The St. Louis Blues offered to trade the Blackhawks their 9th, 24th and 26th overall picks in the 2007 Draft in order to acquire Chicago's first overall selection and draft Kane. On July 25, 2007, Blackhawks' general manager Dale Tallon announced that they had signed Kane to a three-year contract. Kane threw the ceremonial first pitch at a Chicago Cubs game on June 25, 2007, at Wrigley Field. Kane later joined Denis Savard, the Blackhawks' coach, in singing "Take Me Out to the Ball Game". Kane also threw the first pitch at a Buffalo Bisons (AAA) game in August. Kane chose to wear the No. 88 jersey as a reference to his birthyear, a tradition he practiced with his former teammates on the London Knights.

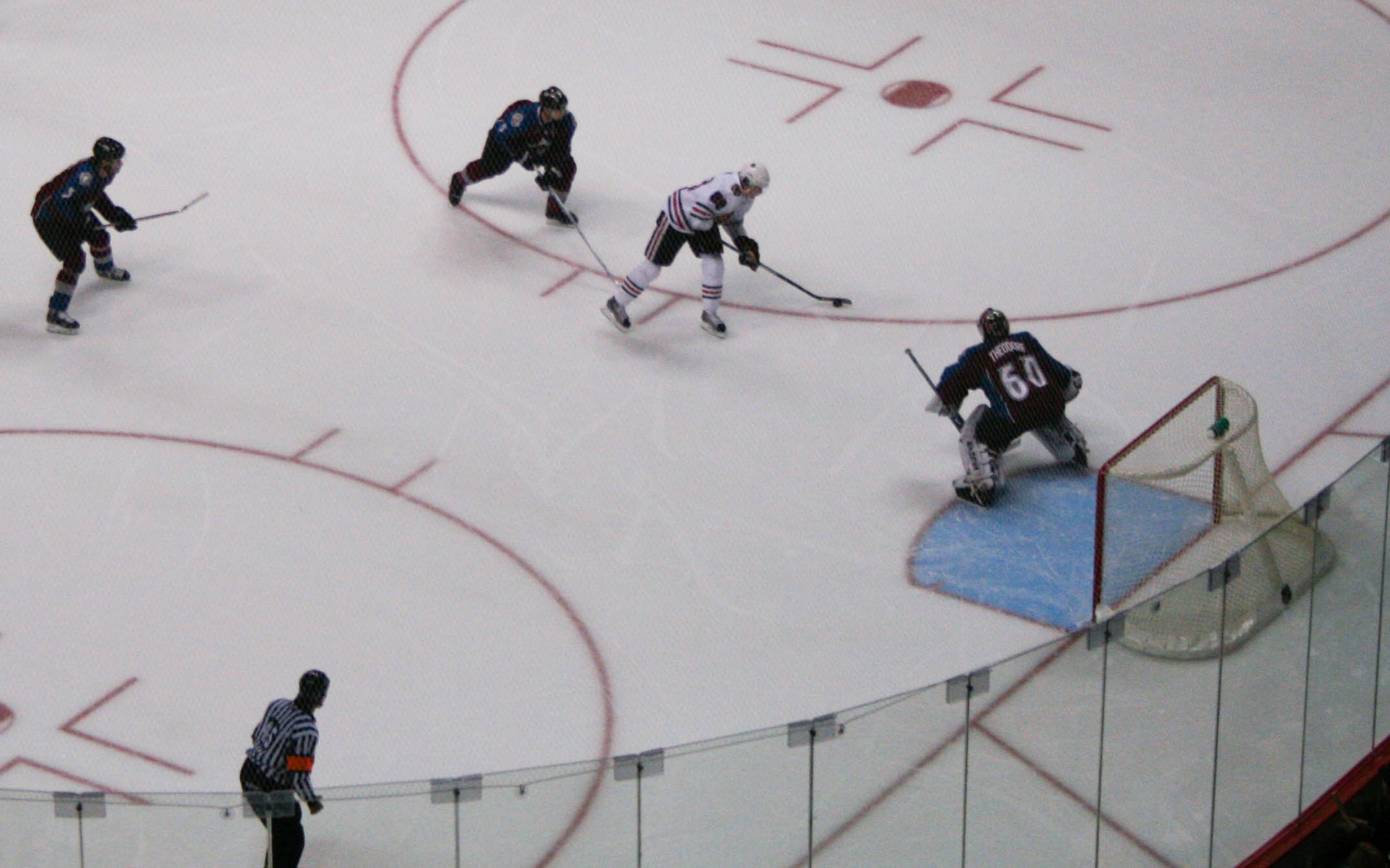
Kane with a breakaway during his inaugural NHL season, February 2008

Kane made his NHL debut on October 4, 2007, against the Minnesota Wild. He recorded his first assist and first shootout goal (a game-winner) two days later against Dominik Hašek of the Detroit Red Wings. He scored his first NHL goal on October 19, beating José Théodore of the Colorado Avalanche. With a quick start to his rookie campaign, on November 2, Kane was named the NHL Rookie of the Month for October after scoring 5 goals and 11 assists in 12 games. On December 15, Kane and the Blackhawks visited the Buffalo Sabres to mark Kane's first return to Buffalo as a professional hockey player. Kane received a special cheer from his hometown and a special ceremony was held before the game. The Blackhawks lost the game three–1, with Kane scoring their lone goal. Kane finished his first NHL campaign atop the rookie scoring race with 72 points. On June 12, 2008, he received the Calder Memorial Trophy, awarded to the NHL's rookie of the year, finishing ahead of teammate Jonathan Toews and Washington Capitals forward Nicklas Bäckström.

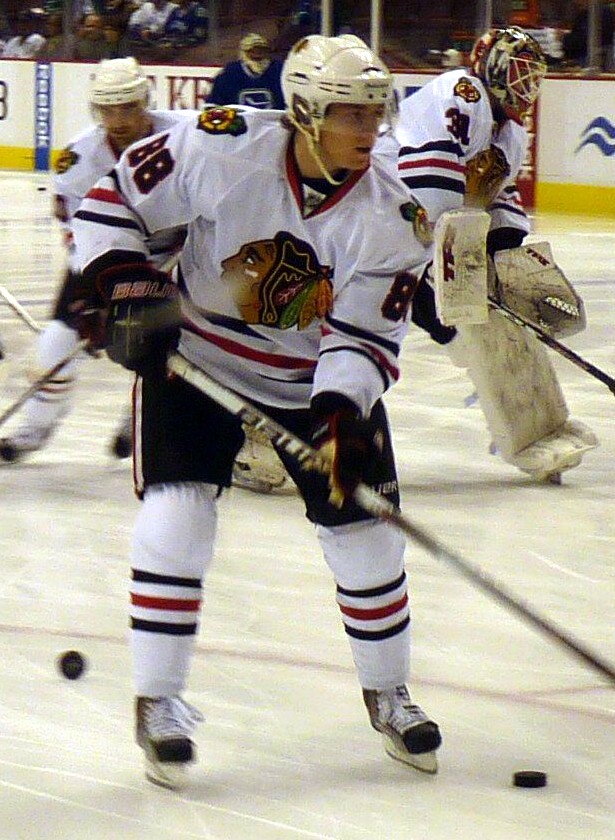
Kane warming up with the Chicago Blackhawks in November 2009

The following season, Kane and Toews helped lead a rejuvenated Blackhawks team back to the Stanley Cup playoffs. After recording 70 points in the regular season and eliminating the fifth-seeded Calgary Flames in the opening round of the 2009 playoffs, Kane scored his first career hat-trick in game six of the second round against the third-seeded Vancouver Canucks on May 11, 2009. The Blackhawks won the game seven–5 for a 4–2 victory in the series, clinching their spot in the Western Conference Finals for the first time since 1995. After the game, Kane told the Chicago Sun-Times that he was "fired up" after Canucks defenseman Willie Mitchell claimed that Kane "couldn't play five-on-five". He finished his first NHL playoffs with nine goals, five assists for 14 points in 16 out of 17 games as the Blackhawks were eliminated in the Western Conference Finals by the defending Stanley Cup champion and second-seeded Detroit Red Wings.

Shortly into the 2009 off-season, the Chicago Tribune reported that Kane would be the cover athlete for EA Sports' NHL 10. In the final season of his initial rookie contract, on December 3, 2009, Kane signed a reported five-year, $31.5 million contract extension with Chicago. The deal was announced simultaneously with contract extensions to both Toews and defenseman Duncan Keith. In the 2009–10 season, Kane finished with all 82 games played with a career-high 88 points (30 goals, 58 assists) to rank ninth in the NHL in scoring. The Blackhawks finished first in the Central Division and second in the Western Conference. They advanced to the 2010 Stanley Cup Final. On June 9, 2010, in game six of the Finals, Kane scored the overtime winner when he shot the puck under the pads of Philadelphia Flyers goaltender Michael Leighton and into the net, winning the Blackhawks the Stanley Cup. The goal ended a 49-year Stanley Cup drought for the Blackhawks. It also made Kane the youngest player in NHL history to score a Stanley Cup-winning goal in overtime; that record previously belonged to Bobby Orr in 1970.

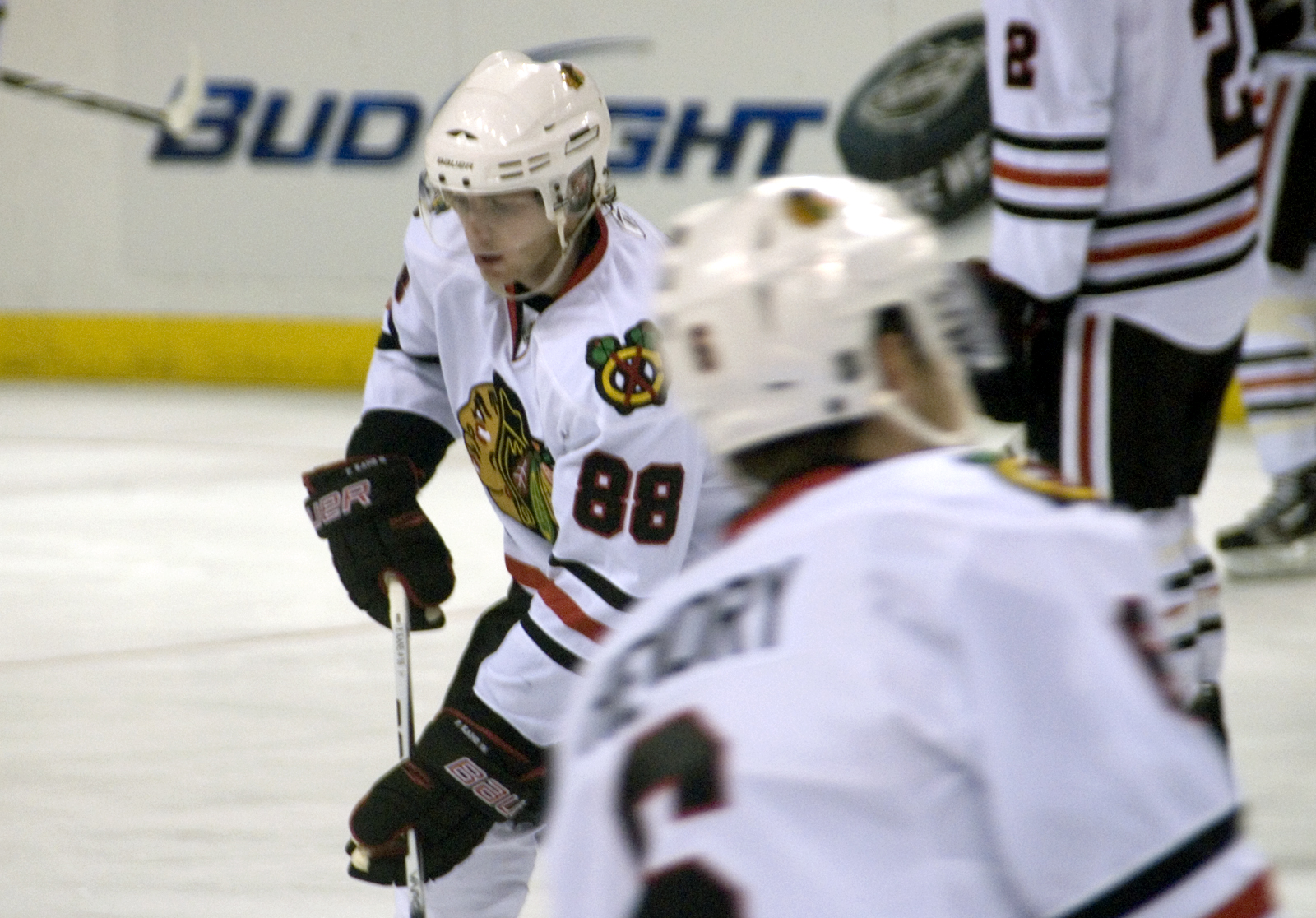
Kane (left) warming up prior to a game in February 2011

On December 5, 2010, in a 4–2 win over the Calgary Flames, Kane suffered a high-ankle sprain as he was hit by Flames defenseman Cory Sarich, causing him to miss the next nine games. As the 2010–11 season went on, Kane was selected as an alternate captain for the 2011 NHL All-Star Game. On March 14, 2011, in a 6–3 win over the San Jose Sharks, Kane scored his 100th NHL goal on Sharks' goaltender Antero Niittymäki, becoming the third youngest player in NHL history to hit the mark. On April 10 in the last game of the season in a 4–3 loss to the Detroit Red Wings, Kane recorded his 200th career assist on a Michael Frolík goal. This loss put the defending Stanley Cup champion Blackhawks in danger of missing the playoffs with their only hope being that the Dallas Stars lose their final game which came later that same day against the Minnesota Wild which they would go on to lose 5–3 resulting in the Blackhawks clinching the eighth and final playoff spot, two points ahead of the Stars. He finished the season 27 goals and 46 assists for 73 points in 73 games. In the Blackhawks first round exit against the Presidents' Trophy-winning Vancouver Canucks, Kane recorded a goal and five assists for six points in all seven games. Kane revealed he underwent surgery to repair a broken wrist he suffered in the penultimate game on April 8 in a 4–2 win over the Detroit Red Wings that was only discovered during the following offseason after the Blackhawks first round playoff exit.

Kane recorded 66 points on 23 goals and 43 assists for 66 points in all 82 games during the 2011–12 season, marking his lowest offensive output since his rookie season as the Blackhawks finished as the sixth seed in the Western Conference. In the first round of the 2012 playoffs, Kane was held goalless with four assists and points recorded as the Blackhawks would go on to lose the series against the third-seeded Phoenix Coyotes in six games.

Shortly after the Blackhawks elimination from the 2012 playoffs, Kane was criticized after photos surfaced showing him in an intoxicated state at a Cinco de Mayo block party in Madison, Wisconsin during the ensuing offseason. Blackhawks general manager Stan Bowman commented, "We are aware of that situation. We followed it closely. It was one of those things where we've discussed it with Patrick. We've handled that internally." While Kane did not face any legal charges or repercussions, he admitted his actions embarrassed the Blackhawks organization, his family, and himself.

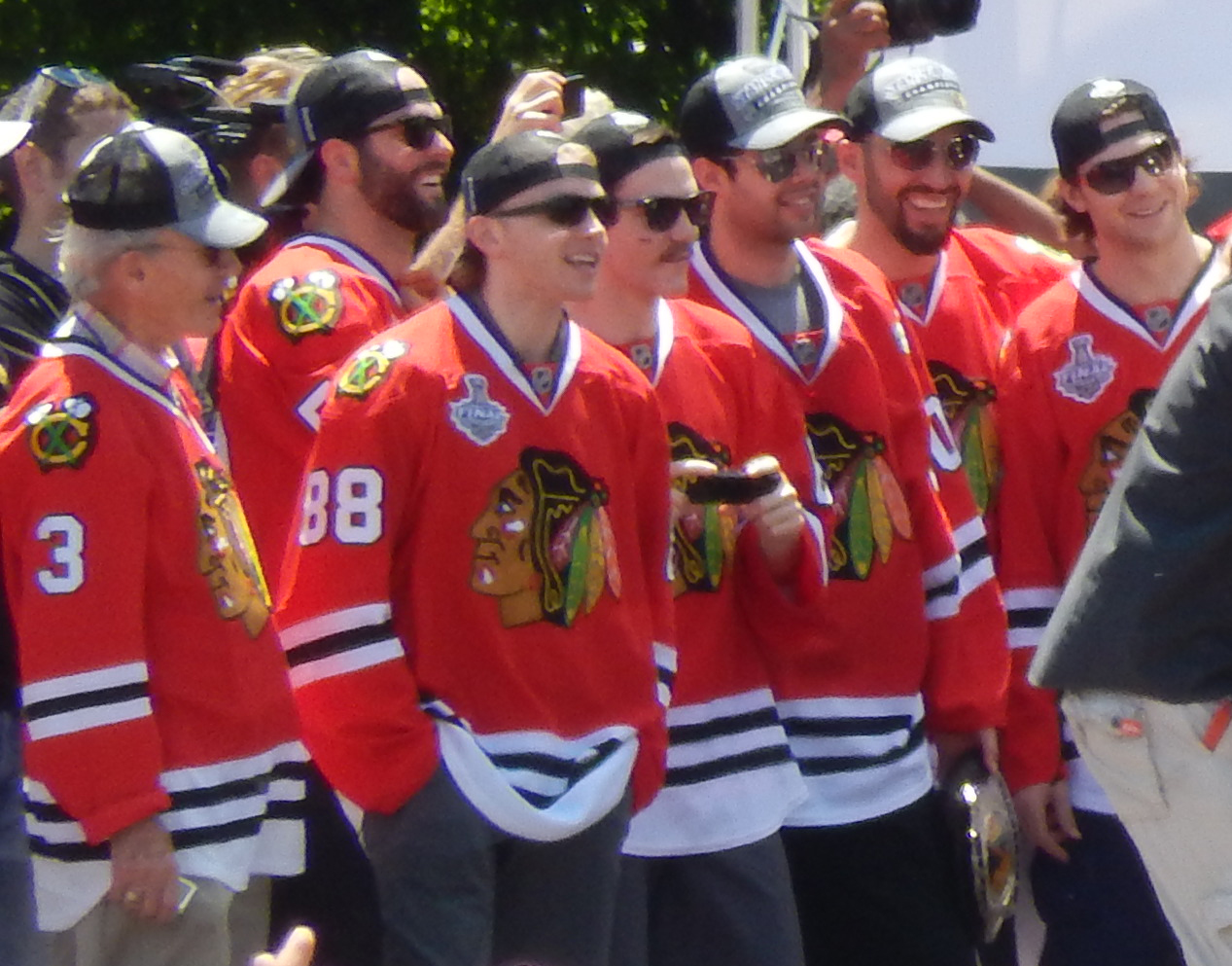
Kane (88) during the Blackhawks' 2013 Stanley Cup victory rally at Grant Park

Kane played overseas, signing a contract on October 24, 2012, to play for Swiss club EHC Biel during the 2012–13 NHL lockout. In 20 National League A games, Kane scored 13 goals and had 10 assists alongside fellow NHL star forward Tyler Seguin, Biel's second NHL player. Kane also played for HC Davos in the 2012 Spengler Cup. When the lockout ended and play began in the 2012–13 season in January 2013, Jonathan Toews tied Kane for the team lead in goals with 23. Kane finished the season as the team leader in assists (32) and points (55). His 55 points were ranked fifth in the league overall only behind Tampa Bay Lightning winger and Art Ross Trophy winner Martin St. Louis, Tampa Bay Lightning center Steven Stamkos, Washington Capitals winger and captain Alexander Ovechkin and Pittsburgh Penguins center and captain Sidney Crosby, respectively. Kane was named a finalist for the Lady Byng Memorial Trophy as the "player adjudged to have exhibited the best type of sportsmanship and gentlemanly conduct combined with a high standard of playing ability." The award would eventually go to Lightning' winger Martin St. Louis and Kane finishing second in the trophy voting. Kane scored his second career playoff hat-trick in the 2013 playoffs against the defending Stanley Cup champion and fifth-seeded Los Angeles Kings, including the series-clinching goal in double overtime of game five of the Western Conference Finals on June 8, 2013. The Blackhawks advanced to the 2013 Stanley Cup Final against the fourth-seeded Boston Bruins. Kane contributed by scoring three goals, one in game four and two in game five, to win the 2013 Conn Smythe Trophy as the Stanley Cup Playoffs MVP. In addition, Kane was the first winger since Claude Lemieux in 1995, and the first number one overall draft pick since Mario Lemieux in 1992, to win the Conn Smythe Trophy.

On March 19, 2014, Kane injured his left leg following a collision with Brenden Morrow in a game against the St. Louis Blues. He missed the remainder of the regular season but returned for the 2014 playoffs. During the playoffs, he recorded a team-high 20 points in all 19 games with 8 goals and 12 assists. As part of that run, on May 2, in game one of Blackhawks' Western Conference Semifinals against the Minnesota Wild, Kane scored two goals, including the game-winning goal while coining his nickname "Showtime". On July 9, 2014, the Blackhawks announced that Kane and Jonathan Toews had both signed eight-year contract extensions, set to start running on July 1, 2015, with an annual average value of $10.5 million.

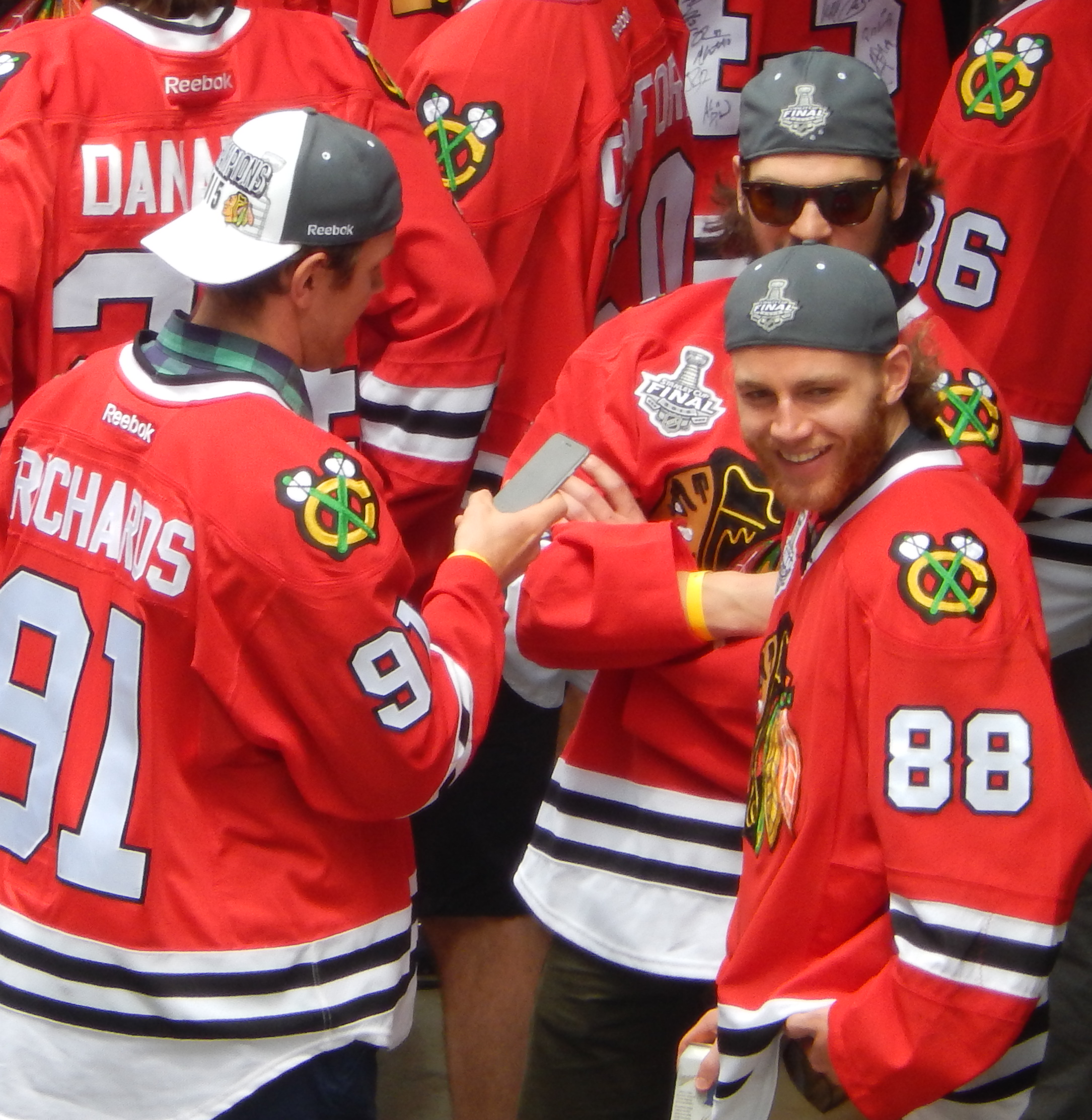
Kane (88) during the Blackhawks' 2015 victory rally at Soldier Field with Brad Richards and Daniel Carcillo

During the 2014–15 season, Kane emerged as one of the NHL's leading scorers. On January 20, 2015, in a 6–1 victory over the Arizona Coyotes, Kane scored his 200th NHL goal on Coyotes' goaltender Mike Smith. Later the same month, he was elected to the 2015 NHL All-Star Game in Columbus, Ohio. He scored 64 points (27 goals and 37 assists) through the regular season. He injured his left clavicle on February 24, after he was cross-checked into the boards while stumbling towards the ice by Alex Petrovic in a game against the Florida Panthers. Kane underwent surgery and was expected to miss 12 weeks. At the time of his injury, he was leading the NHL in points. However, he recovered weeks earlier than initially projected and returned to the Blackhawks at the start of the 2015 playoffs. After initially playing on the second line with Bryan Bickell and Brad Richards, Chicago head coach Joel Quenneville moved Kane to the Blackhawks' top line alongside Jonathan Toews and Brandon Saad after the Anaheim Ducks took a 3–2 game lead in the Western Conference Finals going into game six. The trio combined for nine points over the final two games against the top-seeded Ducks and propelled the Blackhawks to the Stanley Cup Final. Kane helped the Blackhawks defeat the Tampa Bay Lightning by assisting on Duncan Keith's game-winning goal in game six and scoring an insurance goal on Lightning goaltender Ben Bishop with the help of linemates Brad Richards and Brandon Saad for his third Stanley Cup championship in six years. Kane played in all 23 playoff games and finished the playoffs with 11 goals and 12 assists, tying the Lightning's Tyler Johnson with a playoff-high 23 points.

Following the 2015 off-season departures of Brandon Saad and Brad Richards to the Columbus Blue Jackets and Detroit Red Wings respectively, the Blackhawks signed rookie winger Artemi Panarin and traded for veteran center Artem Anisimov to join Kane on the second line for the 2015–16 season. Kane recorded a 26-game point streak between October and December, during which he tallied 16 goals and 24 assists. This was the longest streak by any American-born skater, and the longest point-streak in Blackhawks history. Kane was selected to the 2016 NHL All-Star Game as the captain of the Central Division team. On April 1, 2016, Kane reached the 40-goal mark for the first time in his NHL career when he scored a late goal in the second period of a 5–4 overtime victory against the Winnipeg Jets. On April 3, Kane scored his second hat trick in a 6–4 win against the Boston Bruins, reaching 100 points and becoming the first Blackhawks player to score 100 points in a season since Jeremy Roenick in 1993–94, and the first American NHL player to reach 100 points since Doug Weight in 1995–96. He ended the season with a league-high 106 points (46 goals, 60 assists), winning both the Hart Memorial Trophy and the Art Ross Trophy; he is Chicago's first winner of either award since Stan Mikita scored 87 points in 1967–68 and is the first American player in NHL history to capture either trophy since they have been awarded. Kane also won the Ted Lindsay Award, given to the NHL's most outstanding player as voted by the National Hockey League Players' Association (NHLPA). Kane's 46 goals ranked second overall in the NHL making him the runner up for the Maurice "Rocket" Richard Trophy only behind Washington Capitals forward and captain Alexander Ovechkin who scored 50 goals as the league leader.

Kane continued his success with Panarin and Anisimov during the 2016–17 season. He finished the season playing in all 82 contests with 34 goals, 55 assists 89 points, finishing second in the NHL behind Edmonton Oilers captain Connor McDavid and tied with Pittsburgh Penguins captain Sidney Crosby and was named a finalist for the Ted Lindsay Award for the second straight season and second time in his career which was eventually given to McDavid. Kane was selected to play on the NHL's Central Division team for the 2017 NHL All-Star Game. However, Kane and the top seeded Blackhawks were swept by the eighth seeded Nashville Predators during the first round of the 2017 playoffs. Kane only tallied one goal and assist during the series. During the ensuing off-season, Panarin was traded to the Columbus Blue Jackets in a four-player deal in exchange for Brandon Saad returning to the Blackhawks.

In the 2017 off-season, Kane was named in the 100 Greatest NHL Players list for NHL's Centennial Anniversary.

On December 23, 2017, in a 4–1 loss to the New Jersey Devils, Kane scored his 300th NHL goal against Devils' goaltender Cory Schneider. Kane recorded the first five-point game of his NHL career on January 9, 2018, against the Ottawa Senators. He was selected to play in the 2018 NHL All-Star Game. On January 20, in a game against the New York Islanders, Kane recorded his 800th career point, becoming only the fifth player in franchise history to reach that milestone.

The 2018–19 season saw Kane record (44) goals, along with a career high in assists (66) and points (110) while playing with Dylan Strome and Alex DeBrincat on the teams second line. His 44 goals were fifth most in the NHL overall behind Tampa Bay Lightning forward and captain Steven Stamkos with 45 goals, Toronto Maple Leafs forward John Tavares with 47 goals, Edmonton Oilers forward Leon Draisaitl and the league leading 51 goals from Washington Capitals forward and captain Alexander Ovechkin, respectively. Kane was named a finalist for the Ted Lindsay Award for the third time in his career which would ultimately go to Tampa Bay Lightning forward Nikita Kucherov.

Kane led all skaters in scoring between 2010 and 2019 with 807 points and his 315 goals was fourth most goals scored behind Alexander Ovechkin with 437, Steven Stamkos with 363 and John Tavares with 319, respectively. He was named to the 2010–19 NHL All-Decade Team.

On January 19, 2020, against the Winnipeg Jets, Kane scored his 1,000th NHL career point, assisting on a goal by Brandon Saad. In doing so, Kane became the fourth player in Blackhawks franchise history to reach that mark with the club, along with Stan Mikita, Bobby Hull and Denis Savard. During the 2019–20 season, the Blackhawks appointed Kane as an alternate captain after Brent Seabrook missed the remainder of the season due to multiple surgeries.

Kane retained his role as an alternate captain going into 2020–21 season, which shortened to a 56-game schedule due to the ongoing COVID-19 pandemic. He ended the season with 15 goals and tallied 51 assists for a team-high 66 points in all 56 games played. He finished with the fifth-most points among all skaters in the NHL for the season. On February 28, 2021, Kane recorded his 400th career goal against the Detroit Red Wings on Wings' goaltender Thomas Greiss, becoming the 100th player in NHL history to reach 400 career goals. On March 9, Kane played in his 1,000th career game against the Dallas Stars and became only the seventh player in franchise history to reach the milestone. After the season's conclusion, Kane was named the Best NHL Player at the 2021 ESPY Awards.

Kane appeared in 78 games for the Blackhawks during the 2021–22 season where he recorded 26 goals, 66 assists and 92 points, tying his career high in assists from three years prior in the 2018–19 season, despite playing the entire season with a persistent undisclosed injury. Kane's 92 points marked the third-highest scoring season of his career. As he approached the final season of his current contract in Chicago, Kane commented on his future with the team, stating, "I know in the game of hockey there's not many guys that have played their whole career with one team, so it would be a privilege and an honor to do that, but I guess we'll see how it all plays out."

Kane tallied 16 goals and 29 assists for 45 points in 54 games for Chicago during the 2022–23 campaign.

==== New York Rangers (2023) ====
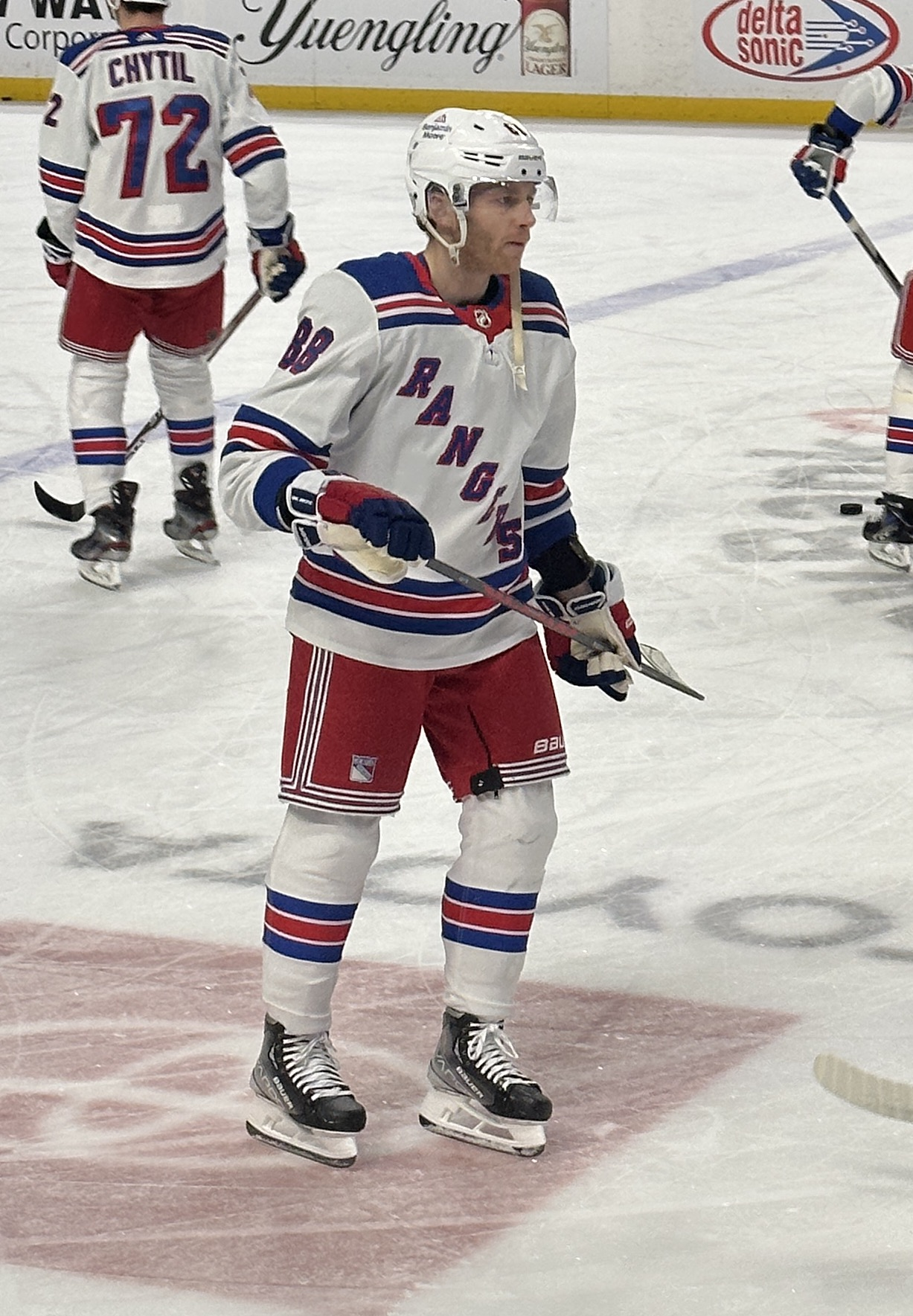
Kane skating with the Rangers in March 2023

The Blackhawks and Kane parted ways at the trade deadline, with the team opting to acquire future draft capital and initiate a full-scale rebuild. On February 28, 2023, Kane's 16-year tenure with the Blackhawks ended as he and prospect Cooper Zech were traded to the New York Rangers in exchange for a conditional second-round pick in the 2023 NHL entry draft, a fourth-round pick, and defenseman Andy Welinski. To help facilitate the trade, the Rangers sent the Arizona Coyotes a fifth-round selection in the 2025 draft. The move reunited Kane with former Blackhawk teammate Artemi Panarin, who played a major role during Kane's MVP season in 2015-16. Kane put up 12 points for the Rangers in 19 games. He recorded one goal and five assists in the postseason, as the Rangers lost to the New Jersey Devils in seven games. Following the Rangers' first-round playoff exit, Pat Brisson announced that Kane underwent successful hip resurfacing surgery on June 1, and would miss from four to sixth months while recovering.

==== Detroit Red Wings (2023–2026) ====
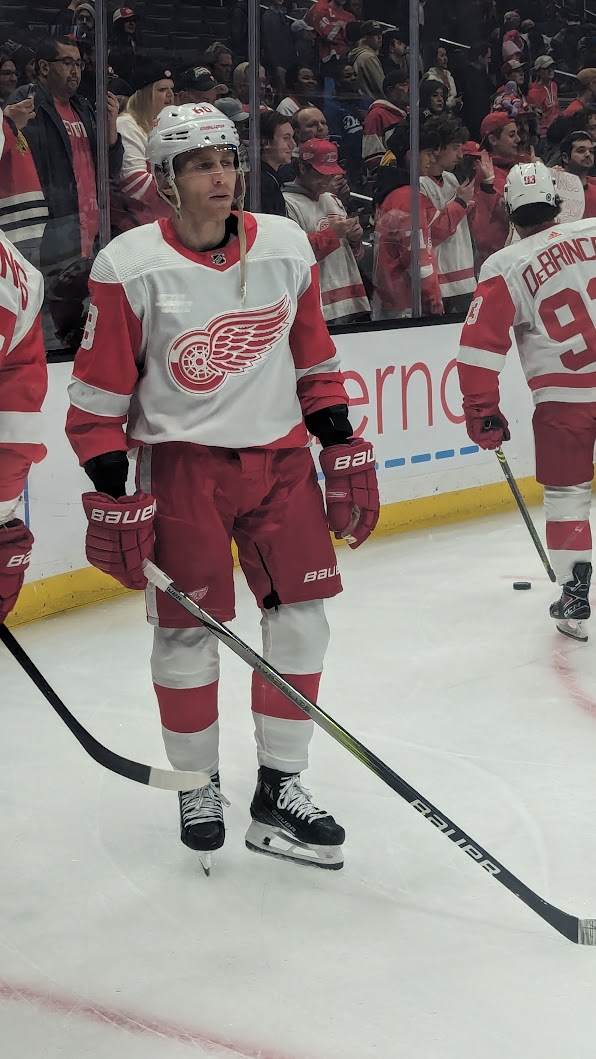
Kane with the Red Wings in January 2024

On November 28, 2023, Kane signed a one-year, $2.75 million contract with the Detroit Red Wings. Kane considered Detroit as one of his preferred destinations upon becoming a free agent. He remarked on the signing, "Throughout the whole process, I felt like Detroit was always there. It was always in the back of my mind, kind of in my heart as well, to come join this team." His decision was also influenced by the opportunity to reunite with former Chicago Blackhawks teammate Alex DeBrincat.

Kane made his 2023 debut on December 7. He scored his first goal with the Red Wings in his second game of the season, against the Ottawa Senators. He enjoyed a six-game point streak in late December, where he tallied five goals and six assists. Kane sustained a lower-body injury on January 14, 2024, that caused him to miss seven games.

On February 25, Kane made his return to Chicago and played his first game against the Chicago Blackhawks since being traded a year prior. In overtime, he scored the game-winning goal on a breakaway and received a standing ovation from the fans at the United Center. Kane concluded the season with 20 goals and 27 assists in 50 games as the Red Wings missed the playoffs. He ranked fourth on the team in goals while his 47 points ranked sixth on the team. He also led the team with three overtime goals and seven game-winning goals. Red Wings general manager Steve Yzerman commended Kane's contributions to the team, stating "He's like a wizard with the puck -- his skill, his sense, his calmness in high-pressure situations and in the danger areas. He was great for our team, and I think he brought a lot of what I guess they call swag."

On June 30, 2024, Kane signed a one-year contract extension with the Red Wings. On December 29, Kane recorded his 1,300th career point with an assist on an Alex DeBrincat goal in a 4–2 win over the Washington Capitals, becoming the second American-born player and 38th player in league history to hit the mark. He completed the season with 21 goals and 59 points in 72 games for the Red Wings.

On June 30, 2025, Kane signed another one-year contract extension with Detroit. On January 8, 2026, he became the 50th player to score 500 career NHL goals. On January 29, Kane scored his 1,375th career point to become the all-time leading U.S.-born point scorer, surpassing Mike Modano's record. Kane finished his second season in Detroit with 16 goals and 41 assists in 66 games. He expressed interest in returning to the NHL for a 20th season.

==== Return to Chicago (2026–present) ====
On July 23, 2026, Kane signed a two-year, $16 million contract to return to the Blackhawks. On September 15, 2026, Kane was named an alternate captain of the Blackhawks. His first game back with the team saw him score once in a 5-2 loss to the Vegas Golden Knights. Kane set the record for most assists by an American-born player (896), surpassing Phil Housley, with a helper on a Connor Bedard goal in a 4-3 win against the Winnipeg Jets on October 15, 2026.

== Player profile ==
Kane is regarded as one of the best American-born players of all time. His success is attributed to his vision, accurate shooting, deceptive stick handling, and high hockey IQ. Kane leverages these skills to anticipate how hockey plays will develop and then positions himself to generate offensive opportunities. Pavel Barber commented on Kane's elusiveness, "They call him 'The Waterbug' because he's so good at entering the zone, just weaving, and cutting through and setting up." Kane is also regarded as a "sniper" due to his accurate wrist shot, as well as a playmaker for his passing skills. Kane reflected, "I love scoring for the fans, for the team, for myself. That's not to say that I won't pass if I see a teammate in a better scoring position. But I like to score."

He is an offensive-minded forward. Despite his elite goal scoring and playmaking abilities, Kane has been considered a liability on defense. He practiced generating takeaways and playing defense during his later years in Chicago. Chicago head coach Joel Quenneville, who played in the NHL as a defenseman during his own playing career before coaching, enticed Kane to play more two-way hockey by telling him during the 2015 Stanley Cup Finals, "You're at your best when you have the puck, and we need you to play [defense] if you want to get the puck back from the other team." An analytical model rated Kane as one of the worst defensive players in the NHL during the 2023 off-season.

Kane is also known for his eccentric goal scoring celebrations. Upon scoring the championship-clinching goal in the 2010 Stanley Cup Finals, Kane threw his gloves in the air and began celebrating while most players were still confused or waiting for the referee to officially signal a goal. He performed a "heartbreaker" celebration after scoring the series-winning goal against the defending Stanley Cup champion Los Angeles Kings in June 2013, which would later be performed by Connor Bedard after scoring an over-time game-winning goal against Slovakia in January 2023. During the first round in the 2014 Stanley Cup playoffs, Kane performed a goal celebration after scoring the game winner against the St. Louis Blues, where he pretended to use a payphone. In 2015, he raised his hands and began shouting "Showtime" after scoring a highlight-reel goal against the Minnesota Wild in the second round of the playoffs.

Kane chewed his mouth guard while skating during his early years in the NHL, which became part of his signature on-ice appearance. One of his game-used mouth guards was auctioned for $4,000 at a Blackhawks charity auction, while another is showcased in the Hockey Hall of Fame. Other American-born skaters, including Clayton Keller, Matthew and Brady Tkachuk have also followed suit and chewed their mouth guards while playing.

== International play ==
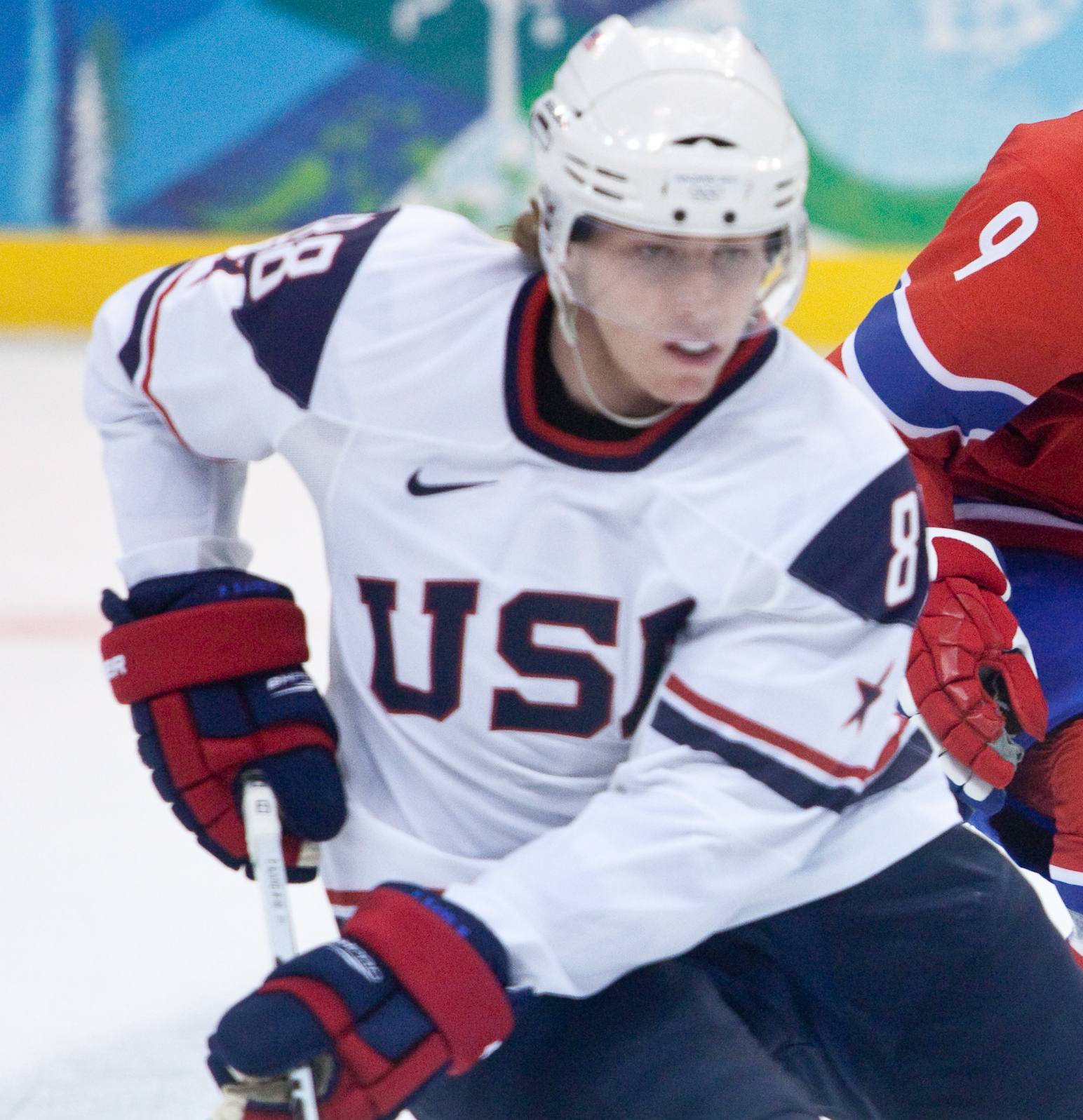
- Kane at the 2010 Winter Olympics

Medal record

Men's ice hockey

Representing the United States

Winter Olympics
Silver medal – second place	2010 Vancouver	

World Championships
Bronze medal – third place	2018 Denmark	

World Junior Championships
Bronze medal – third place	2007 Sweden	

World U18 Championships
Gold medal – first place	2006 Sweden	

Kane has competed internationally for the United States. He first represented the United States in the 2006 IIHF U18 Championships, in which he led the tournament in scoring with 12 points (five goals and seven assists) in only six games played. His two points per game pace led the United States to the gold medal and earned him individual all-star team honors.

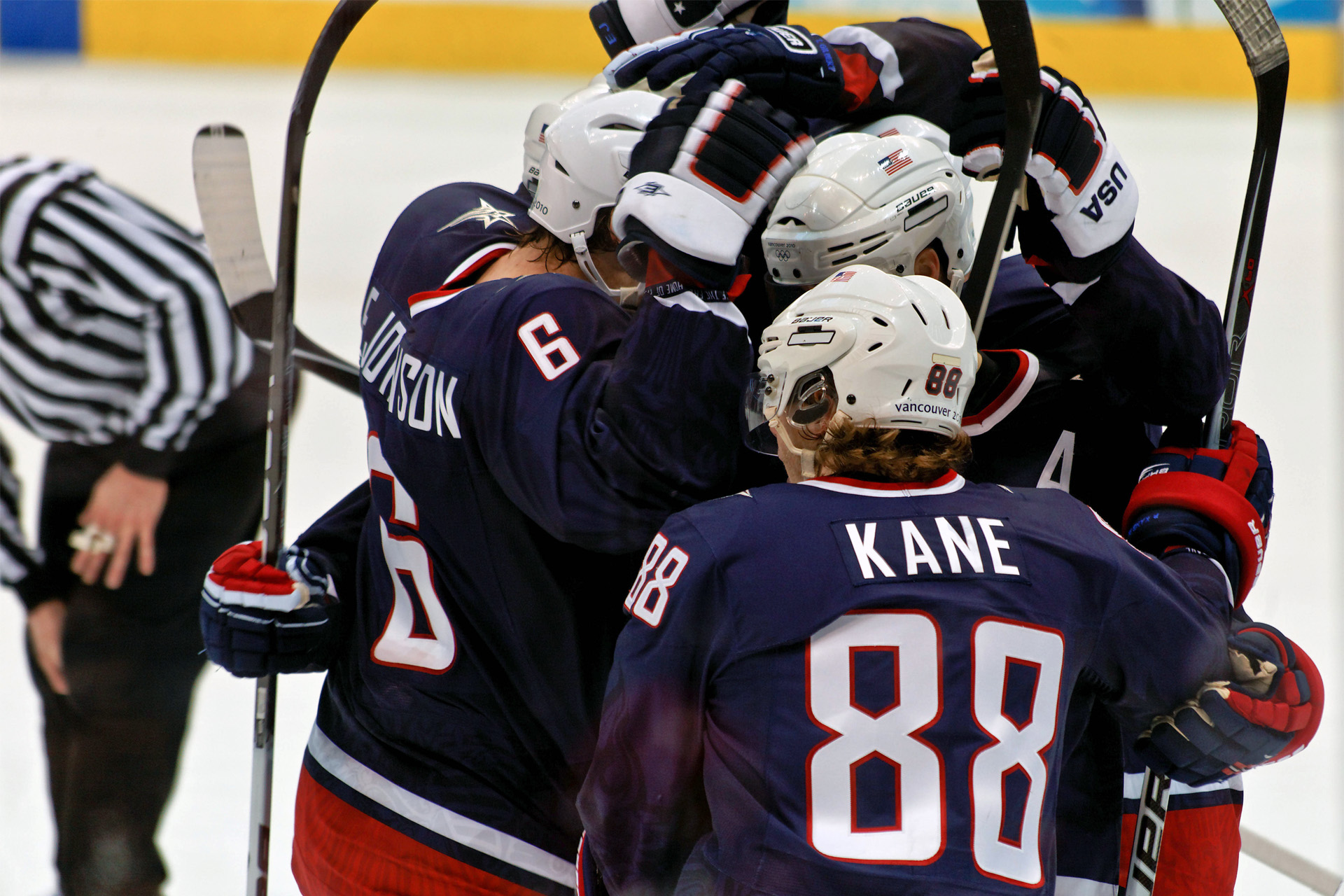
Kane, alongside Erik Johnson, celebrates a goal by Ryan Kesler during the 2010 Winter Olympics.

The next year, he moved onto the United States' U20 team at the 2007 World Juniors. He was one of only three players on the team playing major junior hockey. He continued his international pace with five goals and four assists in seven games to finish second in tournament scoring and, once again, garner an all-star team selection. His team did not perform as well as his U18 team, but they did manage to go home with the bronze medal. After making the NHL and being unable to play in the 2008 WJC due to professional commitments with the Chicago Blackhawks, he played in the 2008 World Championships. He posted 10 points (three goals and seven assists) in seven games as the United States finished sixth.

Kane was selected to represent the United States in the 2010 Olympic Games in Vancouver, where he and the team won the silver medal. During the tournament he scored three goals and two assists in six games. Kane represented the United States again in the 2014 Olympic Games in Sochi. He missed two penalty shots in a loss against Finland in the bronze medal game.

On April 9, 2018, Kane was named the captain of Team USA for the 2018 IIHF World Championship. Kane scored two goals including a game winner in a 3–2 victory against the Czech Republic in the quarterfinals. The U.S. team finished the competition with the bronze medal after losing to Sweden in the semifinals but beating Canada. Kane finished the championships as the tournament's leading scorer with eight goals and 12 assists in 10 games. He was named the Most Valuable Player of 2018 Men's World Championship.

== Personal life ==
Kane has three younger sisters. He attended Detroit Country Day School but left before graduating.

During the offseason, he lives in Hamburg, New York in a house on the shores of Lake Erie, which he purchased in March 2012. Kane lived with Stan Bowman, then an assistant general manager for the Blackhawks, when he first arrived in Chicago. Kane resided at the Trump International Hotel and Tower during the NHL season in a two-bedroom condo that he acquired in September 2008. However, Kane listed his Trump Tower condo for sale in the summer of 2016. He purchased a mansion in Lake Forest, Illinois in 2023.

Kane has an endorsement deal with Bauer Hockey. He also appeared in commercials for McDonald's and Gatorade.

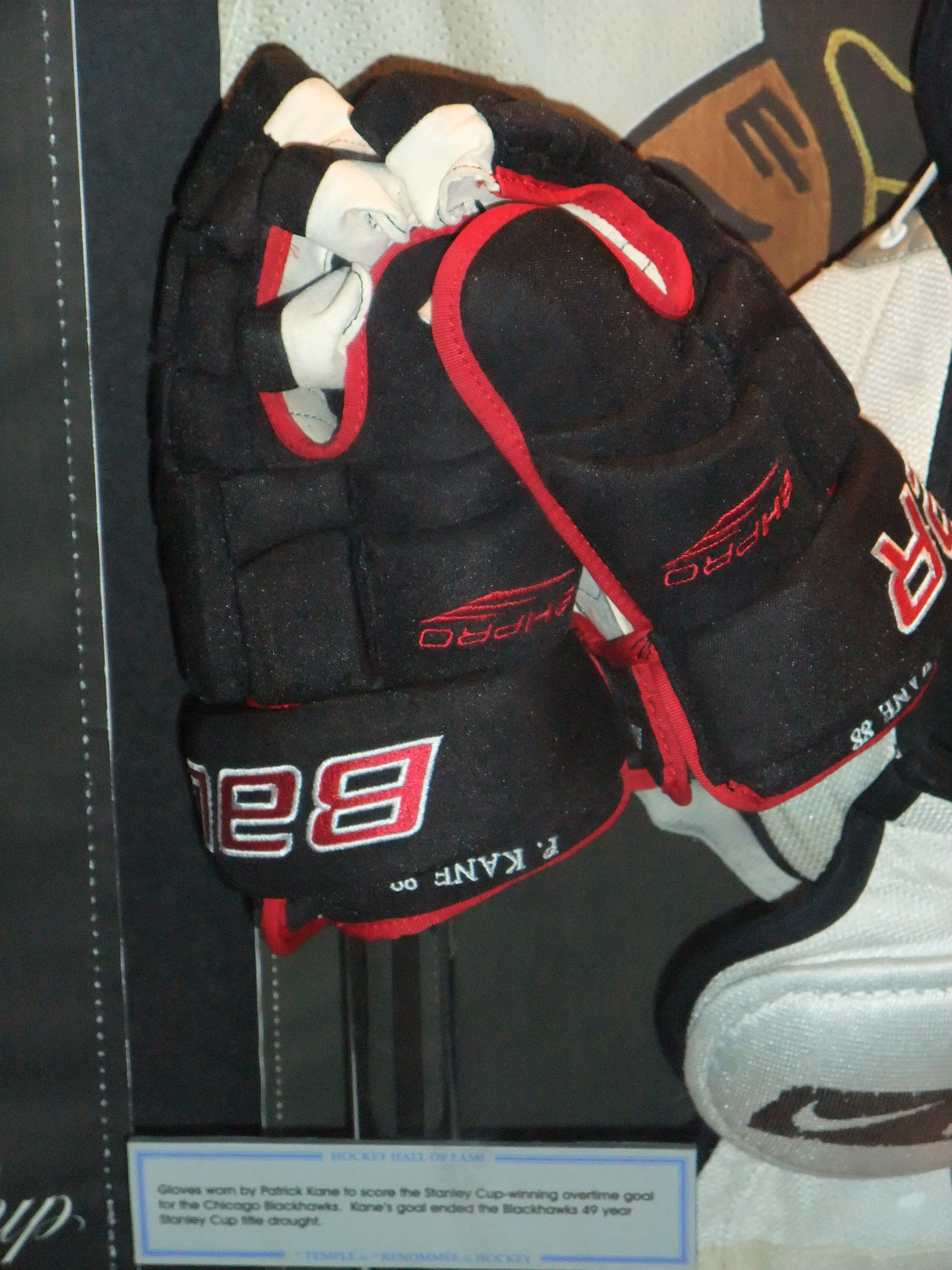
Gloves used by Kane to score the series-winning goal of the 2010 Stanley Cup Final. The gloves he used were from Bauer Hockey, a company with which Kane has an endorsement deal.

Kane and his girlfriend have one son together, born in November 2020.

=== Charities ===
Kane participated in the Denis Savard Charity Golf Tournament in 2016. He played in an ice hockey game, Champs for Charity, which raised $323,000 for the Ronald McDonald House Charities of Chicagoland and Northwest Indiana in 2012.

=== Misdemeanor charges ===
On August 9, 2009, Kane and his cousin, James M. Kane, were arrested in Buffalo. According to a police report, Kane was apprehended around 5:00 a.m. after allegedly punching cab driver Jan Radecki when he claimed to not have proper change for their trip fare. Kane and his cousin's cab fare came out to be $14.80, and they gave him $15.00.

Kane was charged with second-degree robbery, fourth-degree criminal mischief, and theft of services. He pleaded not guilty. On August 17, Kane apologized for the distress he caused, saying he had been "at the wrong place at the wrong time," and mentioned his family, the Chicago Blackhawks organization, and their fan base—but not Radecki. Kane and his cousin appeared before a grand jury on August 19. Although cleared of any felony charges, the two were still indicted on less severe misdemeanor assault, theft, and harassment charges. Kane and his cousin reiterated their not guilty pleas when appearing in court the next day. On August 27, Kane and cousin pleaded guilty to noncriminal disorderly conduct charges, and were both given conditional discharges, avoiding any penalties if they stayed out of trouble for a year, and also ordered to apologize to Radecki.

=== 2015 police investigation ===
On August 6, 2015, The Buffalo News reported that Kane was the subject of a sexual assault investigation by police in Hamburg, New York, in connection with an incident that allegedly occurred the previous weekend. The Erie County District Attorney's Office later declined to press charges against him, stating that the complainant's allegation was not sufficiently substantiated by credible evidence. Prior to office's determination that it would not press charges, the mother of his accuser orchestrated a hoax in which she attempted to mislead the public into an impression that critical evidence had been tampered with.

== Career statistics ==
=== Regular season and playoffs ===
Bold indicates led league

			Regular season					Playoffs
Season	Team	League	GP	G	A	Pts	PIM	GP	G	A	Pts	PIM
2004–05	U.S. NTDP Juniors	NAHL	40	16	21	37	8	9	7	8	15	2
2004–05	U.S. NTDP U17	USDP	23	16	17	33	8	—	—	—	—	—
2005–06	U.S. NTDP U18	NAHL	15	17	17	34	12	—	—	—	—	—
2005–06	U.S. NTDP U18	USDP	43	35	33	68	10	—	—	—	—	—
2006–07	London Knights	OHL	58	62	83	145	52	16	10	21	31	16
2007–08	Chicago Blackhawks	NHL	82	21	51	72	52	—	—	—	—	—
2008–09	Chicago Blackhawks	NHL	80	25	45	70	42	16	9	5	14	12
2009–10	Chicago Blackhawks	NHL	82	30	58	88	20	22	10	18	28	6
2010–11	Chicago Blackhawks	NHL	73	27	46	73	28	7	1	5	6	2
2011–12	Chicago Blackhawks	NHL	82	23	43	66	40	6	0	4	4	10
2012–13	EHC Biel	NLA	20	13	10	23	6	—	—	—	—	—
2012–13	Chicago Blackhawks	NHL	47	23	32	55	8	23	9	10	19	8
2013–14	Chicago Blackhawks	NHL	69	29	40	69	22	19	8	12	20	8
2014–15	Chicago Blackhawks	NHL	61	27	37	64	10	23	11	12	**23**	0
2015–16	Chicago Blackhawks	NHL	82	46	60	**106**	30	7	1	6	7	14
2016–17	Chicago Blackhawks	NHL	82	34	55	89	32	4	1	1	2	2
2017–18	Chicago Blackhawks	NHL	82	27	49	76	32	—	—	—	—	—
2018–19	Chicago Blackhawks	NHL	81	44	66	110	22	—	—	—	—	—
2019–20	Chicago Blackhawks	NHL	70	33	51	84	40	9	2	7	9	2
2020–21	Chicago Blackhawks	NHL	56	15	51	66	14	—	—	—	—	—
2021–22	Chicago Blackhawks	NHL	78	26	66	92	18	—	—	—	—	—
2022–23	Chicago Blackhawks	NHL	54	16	29	45	10	—	—	—	—	—
2022–23	New York Rangers	NHL	19	5	7	12	6	7	1	5	6	6
2023–24	Detroit Red Wings	NHL	50	20	27	47	16	—	—	—	—	—
2024–25	Detroit Red Wings	NHL	72	21	38	59	12	—	—	—	—	—
2025–26	Detroit Red Wings	NHL	67	16	41	57	16	—	—	—	—	—
NHL totals			1,369	508	892	1,400	470	143	53	85	138	70

=== International ===
Year	Team	Event	Result	GP	G	A	Pts	PIM
2005	United States	U17	5th	5	1	7	8	0
2006	United States	U18	1st place, gold medalist(s)	6	7	5	12	2
2007	United States	WJC	3rd place, bronze medalist(s)	7	5	4	9	4
2008	United States	WC	6th	7	3	7	10	0
2010	United States	OG	2nd place, silver medalist(s)	6	3	2	5	2
2014	United States	OG	4th	6	0	4	4	4
2016	United States	WCH	7th	3	0	2	2	0
2018	United States	WC	3rd place, bronze medalist(s)	10	8	12	20	0
2019	United States	WC	7th	8	2	10	12	4
Junior totals				18	13	16	29	6
Senior totals				40	16	37	53	10

== Awards and achievements ==
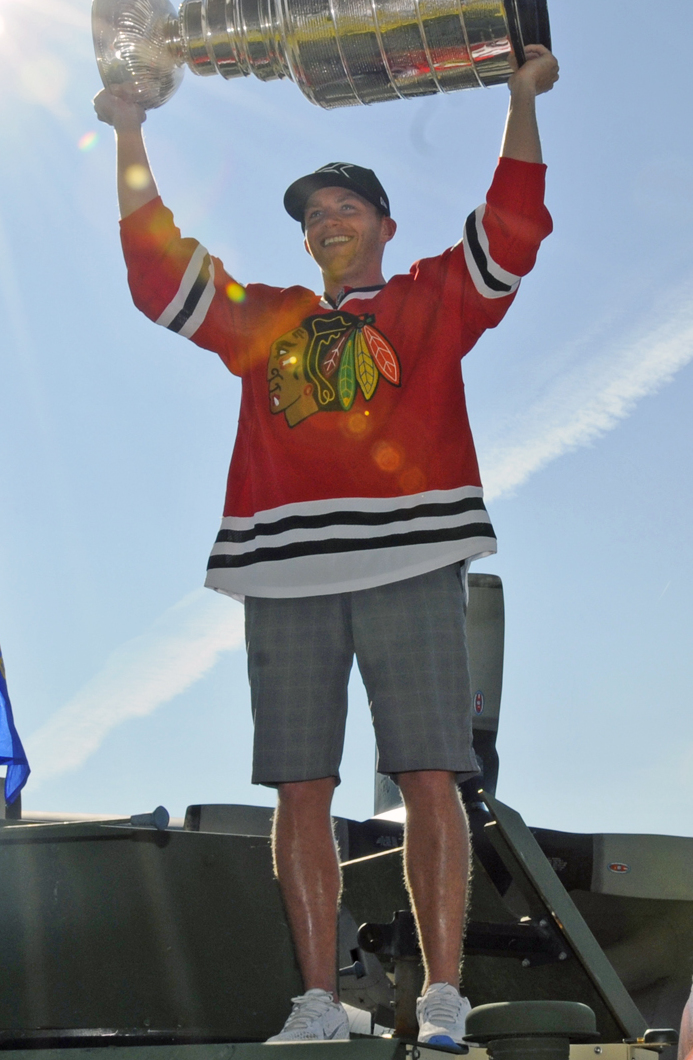
Kane hoists the Stanley Cup in August 2013.

Award	Year
CHL / OHL
OHL All-Rookie Team	2007
OHL First All-Star Team	2007
OHL Rookie of the Year	2007
CHL Rookie of the Year	2007
NHL
Calder Memorial Trophy	2008
NHL All-Rookie team	2008
NHL All-Star Game	2009, 2011, 2012, 2015, 2016, 2017, 2018, 2019, 2020
Stanley Cup champion	2010, 2013, 2015
NHL first All-Star team	2010, 2016, 2017
Conn Smythe Trophy	2013
Art Ross Trophy	2016
Hart Memorial Trophy	2016
Ted Lindsay Award	2016
NHL second All-Star team	2019
NHL 2010s All-Decade First Team	2020
EA Sports NHL cover athlete	2010
International
IIHF World U18 Championships All-Star Team	2006
World Junior Ice Hockey Championships All-Star Team	2007
Ice Hockey World Championship MVP	2018
IIHF All-Time USA Team	2020

Awards and achievements
Preceded by John Tavares	CHL Rookie of the Year; 2007	Succeeded by Taylor Hall
Preceded by Erik Johnson	NHL first overall draft pick 2007	Succeeded by Steven Stamkos
Preceded by Jonathan Toews	Chicago Blackhawks first-round draft pick 2007	Succeeded by Kyle Beach
Preceded by Evgeni Malkin	Winner of the Calder Memorial Trophy; 2008	Succeeded by Steve Mason
Preceded by Jonathan Quick	Conn Smythe Trophy winner 2013	Succeeded by Justin Williams
Preceded by Jamie Benn	Art Ross Trophy winner 2016	Succeeded by Connor McDavid
Preceded by Carey Price	Ted Lindsay Award winner 2016	Succeeded by Connor McDavid
Preceded by Carey Price	Hart Memorial Trophy winner 2016	Succeeded by Connor McDavid
