= Donruss =

American sports card manufacturer

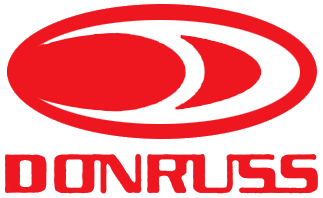
- Type: Private
- Industry: Collectable
- Founded: 1954
- Defunct: 2009; 17 years ago
- Fate: Acquired by Panini Group in 2009, becoming Panini America
- Headquarters: Irving, Texas, United States
- Area served: Worldwide
- Key people: Mark Warsop (CEO)
- Products: Trading cards
- Number of employees: 50+
- Parent: Pinnacle Brands (1996–98)

Donruss was a US-based trading cards manufacturing company founded in 1954 and acquired by the Panini Group in 2009. The company started in the 1950s, producing confectionery, evolved into Donruss and started producing trading cards. During the 1960s and 1970s Donruss produced entertainment-themed cards. Its first sports theme cards were produced in 1965, when it created a series of racing cards sponsored by Hot Rod Magazine.

Its next series of sports products came in 1981, when it produced baseball and golf trading cards. It was one of three manufacturers to produce baseball cards from 1981 through 1985, along with Fleer and Topps. In 1986, Sportflics (Major League Marketing) entered the market as the fourth fully licensed card producer, followed by Score in 1988, and Upper Deck in 1989. Since entering the trading card market, it has produced a variety of sports trading cards, including American football, baseball, basketball, boxing, golf, ice hockey, racing and tennis; and has acquired a number of brand names. In 1996, Donruss was acquired by rival Pinnacle Brands, makers of Score and Sportflix.

Donruss produced baseball cards from 1981 to 1998, when then-parent company Pinnacle Brands filed for bankruptcy. Baseball card production resumed in 2001, when then-parent company Playoff Corporation acquired the rights to produce baseball cards. From 2007 to 2009, Donruss released baseball card products featuring players that were no longer under MLB contract after MLB decided to limit licensing options in 2005.

== Company history ==
=== 1954 to 1998, Donruss ===
Douglas Thomas, Donald, and Russel Wiener founded the original Donruss company in 1954. At first, they were the owners of the Thomas Wiener Company located in Memphis, Tennessee. They manufactured hard candy, suckers and Super Bubble gum. Combining their first names, Douglas, Don, and Russ, they renamed their company Donruss and continued to produce candy and gum. Donruss produced several entertainment-themed trading cards, from such television shows as The Addams Family, Voyage to the Bottom of the Sea, The Monkees and The Flying Nun from 1961 until 1969.

That same year, Donruss made national news with a $30,000 surtax dispute. Donruss paid its surtax but sued to get the money back. It won in U.S. Circuit Court but lost in U.S. Supreme Court. Donruss claimed its earnings did not pass the "purpose test" to avoid paying the taxes, and having lost it prevented any other corporation from using the purpose test.

Later that year, Donruss was purchased by General Mills. Donruss continued making entertainment-themed cards throughout the 1970s, adding titles like The Dukes of Hazzard, Elvis Presley, Kiss and Saturday Night Fever to its product lines. Producing these cards was profitable; however, Donruss, looking for additional avenues of income, desired to enter the baseball card market. Unfortunately, Topps had exclusive rights and Donruss would have to wait until Fleer's lawsuit against Topps.

In 1975, Fleer sued Topps over its exclusive baseball rights. After five years a federal judge ruled that Topps illegally obtained Major League Baseball Players Association rights. Donruss and Fleer negotiated deals with Major League Baseball and by late 1980 Donruss had acquired the rights to produce baseball cards. Its first baseball card set was produced and ready in time for the 1981 season. In August of that year, an appellate court overturned the judge's ruling. Quick to react, Fleer's lawyers found a loophole in Topps' contract that stated it had exclusive rights to sell baseball cards with gum or candy. So after 1981, Fleer started distributing its baseball cards with stickers, and Donruss started distributing its cards with puzzle pieces.

Overproduction and distribution was an early problem for Donruss. In 1983, Huhtamäki Oyj purchased Beatrice US Confections, Donruss and Leaf Candy Company, merging the three companies into "Leaf, Inc." The company continued to use the "Donruss" name on baseball cards, which now benefited from Leaf's established distribution network. The Leaf brand was used from 1985 through 1988 on specially made baseball cards distributed in Canada, and in 1990 on a premium series of cards distributed in the U.S.

Donruss expanded its Memphis plant from 256,000 square feet (23,800 m^{2}) to nearly 400,000, grew from 550 employees to 720 and continued to make trading cards and bubble gum at the facility throughout 1991. In 1992 demand for higher-quality cards rose, and standard card sales dropped. Donruss responded by reducing production, increasing price, upgrading card quality and randomly inserted limited edition and autographed insert cards to its new foil packaged cards. Donruss also partnered with Coca-Cola, Cracker Jack and McDonald's to create special card series, and created a less expensive line of cards called "Triple Play" targeted at young collectors.

In 1993, Donruss acquired the rights to produce hockey cards. With poor sales in 1994, due in part to a Major League Baseball strike and National Hockey League lockout, Donruss began producing new lines of entertainment cards, and a football collectible card game under license from NXT Games, in 1995. In 1996, Pinnacle Brands acquired the Donruss/Leaf brands, as well as their baseball and hockey licenses, from Huhtamäki Oyj for about $41 million. The entertainment line was sold to United States Playing Card Company. Pinnacle used the Donruss and Leaf brands on baseball, football and hockey cards.

In July 1998, Pinnacle Brands filed for Chapter 11 bankruptcy protection.

=== 1970 to 2001, Playoff Corp. ===
Playoff Corp. can be traced back to as early as 1970 with a company called Optigraphics. At the time, Optigraphics specialized in advanced printing technology. Its first sports work was seen in 1983 when 7-Eleven began distributing multiple-image discs utilizing the lenticular printing process which gave an appearance as though the image were moving, or changing –with purchases of Slurpee drinks.

In 1985, the company obtained baseball licenses and started producing its unique style of cards under the name "Sportflics". This also marked the first time any company used full-color photography on the back of sports cards. Minus "Magic Motion", but using the same style as its Sportflics cards, it released baseball cards under the Score brand in 1988 and football cards under the Score brand in 1989.

In 1992, founders and owners Ann Blake and John Flavin divorced. Flavin maintained the Score brand. Blake left and founded a new company called Cardz Distribution, which later developed into Playoff Corp. and ultimately gained control of the Score brand, along with Donruss and Leaf, in 1998 when then parent company Pinnacle Brands, Inc. was under bankruptcy. Playoff could not obtain Pinnacle/Donruss' baseball and hockey licenses, however. Playoff was producing high-end lines of football cards, generating some $25 million in annual revenues. With its Pinnacle Brands purchase, Playoff began producing trading cards under the Donruss Elite, Leaf and Score brand names.

Playoff expanded its business in 2000 by adding a 36,000-square-foot (3,300 m^{2}) distribution facility, and developed its Score Entertainment subsidiary to produce Dragonball Z trading cards.

=== 2001 to 2009, Donruss Playoff L.P. ===
In 2001 Playoff Corp. became Donruss Playoff L.P., acquired the rights to produce baseball cards and established its headquarters in Arlington, Texas.

Donruss Playoff expanded its entertainment lines in 2002, with such trading cards as Buffy the Vampire Slayer through its new Score Entertainment division. Donruss also produced the first Spanish-only baseball card set.

In 2003, Donruss Playoff stirred up controversy when it paid $264,210 at auction for a rare game-worn Babe Ruth jersey, which it then cut up and turned into 2,100 memorabilia cards.

In 2004, Donruss Playoff acquired the rights to Pacific Trading Cards, Inc., a Lynnwood, Washington—based company, that had a major impact on sports cards in the mid-1990s and early 2000s.

From 2007 to 2009, Donruss has released baseball card products featuring players that are no longer under MLB contract.

=== 2009 and beyond ===
On March 13, 2009, Panini s.p.a. of Italy (which had previously acquired the exclusive license to produce NBA trading cards beginning with the 2009–10 season), announced that it had purchased Donruss Playoff. Effective immediately, the company was renamed Panini America, Inc. However, the company continued to operate out of Irving, Texas, with much of the existing upper management.

During the 2010 Industry Summit Collectibles (a gathering where retailers can meet leaders in the trading cards industry, and listen to discussions about card collecting), held in Las Vegas on April 11, Panini America announced changes to the company's distribution network. Only retail stores would be authorized to sell Panini products directly to consumers, and any retailer attempting to wholesale would lose its authorization. Only wholesalers would be authorized to sell Panini products directly to retailers, and any wholesaler attempting to retail would lose its authorization.

Panini also outlined other initiatives: that they will continue to destroy returned NBA trading cards to protect "collectibility", willing to implement minimum advertised price if needed, formation of a brick-and-mortar standards committee, upgraded ordering systems and schedules, new football and hockey trading cards and other products featuring autographs and memorabilia swatches from sports, history and pop culture.

== Baseball cards ==
=== 1981 to 1989 ===
Logo from 1980 to 1985. It was revived for the 2002 retro-themed Donruss Originals set

In late 1980, on the heels of a court ruling in favor of Fleer that voided Topps' exclusivity deal, Donruss rushed into production a 605-card set for the 1981 season. The first printings were riddled with errors (though Fleer's first set was even worse in this regard), most of which were fixed in subsequent runs. They were also printed on flimsy card stock and there were no factory sets; rather, the cards were shipped to dealers in 100-count lots and were then collated by hand. TCMA of Amawalk, New York handled dealer business. TV personality Keith Olbermann was a photographer for some of the cards that were part of the 1981 Donruss set.

With an entire offseason to prepare, Donruss shipped a much improved, more polished set for 1982. The 1982 offering also saw the introduction of the Diamond Kings, the first 26 cards of the 660-card set, made up of oil paintings by noted sports artist Dick Perez. An appeal of the 1978 Fleer v. Topps ruling in 1981 barred the two new card companies from using gum premiums; Fleer switched to team logo stickers in 1982, while Donruss included jigsaw puzzle pieces with a pack of cards. Babe Ruth was pictured as "Hall of Fame Diamond King" when the 63-piece puzzle was assembled. Donruss also began selling to dealers directly, the first of the major card companies to offer factory sets for those buying in bulk. Notable card in this set is Cal Ripken's rookie card.

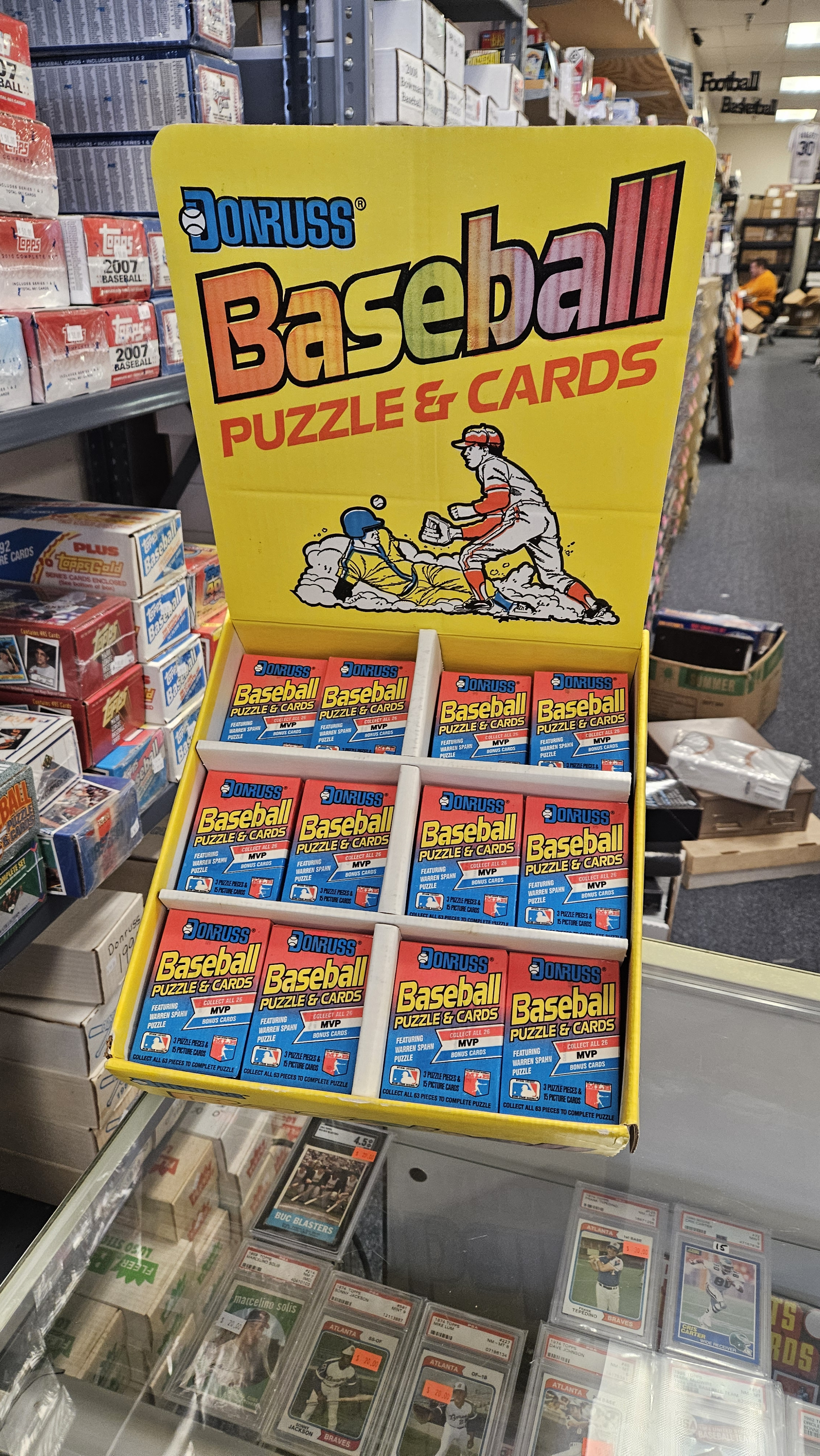
A box of Donruss baseball cards in a store in 2025

Donruss released three baseball card sets in 1983. Its standard 660-card set (with only minimal changes; a glove replacing the ball on the front and the back switching from blue to yellow), a 60-card "Action All-Star" set and a 44-card "Hall of Fame Heroes" set. "Action All-Star" were not the standard 2½" by 3½" card size, rather 3½" by 5" and included a 63-piece Mickey Mantle puzzle (eight cards per pack and three pieces on one card per pack). The "Hall of Fame Heroes" set were standard sized cards issued in the same packs as the "Action All-Star" cards, but rather than picturing photographs of the players Donruss used its Diamond King style and showed Dick Perez oil paintings. Notable rookie cards in their standard set include Ryne Sandberg, Tony Gwynn and Wade Boggs. Another card of note is an error card of Ron Jackson where Donruss claimed he played for the A's rather than the Angels. Donruss did issue a card to correct the error. That year's jigsaw puzzle inserted in wax packs featured Ty Cobb.

The 1984 660-card base set was among the company's most successful; however, only 658 are numbered. A new feature introduced that year were two "Living Legend" cards designated A (featuring Gaylord Perry and Rollie Fingers) and B (featuring Johnny Bench and Carl Yastrzemski). These were issued as bonus cards in wax packs but not issued in the factory set. Another new feature among the base set were labeling cards 27 through 46 as "Rated Rookies" chosen by Bill Madden. The 1984 jigsaw puzzle inserted in wax packs was Duke Snider. A notable card in this set is Don Mattingly's rookie card. Donruss, again, produced the 60-card "Action All-Star" set, with the year's 63-piece puzzle featuring Ted Williams, and created another 3½" by 5" 60-card set called "Champions". The "Champions" featured the artwork of Dick Perez and were issued in cello packs along with pieces of the Duke Snider puzzle.

Donruss released six baseball card sets in 1985. The standard 660-card set, 60-card "Action All-Stars", 56-card "Highlights", 8-card "Hall of Fame Sluggers", 28-card "Super Diamond Kings" and 263-card "Leaf" set. The standard set contained the previous year's features; the first 26 cards are Diamond Kings with artwork by Perez-Steele Galleries and cards 27 through 46 as Rated Rookies. Lou Gehrig puzzle pieces were inserted in the year's wax packs. A notable card in this set is Roger Clemens' rookie card. The wax boxes, which held the wax packs, of the standard issue set featured four standard-size cards, styled the same as the standard set, on the bottom of the box and are numbered with a PC prefix.

"Action All-Stars" measured the usual 3½" by 5", but rather than using a different puzzle for this set Donruss issued the standard set's Lou Gehrig puzzle pieces with the cards. The "Highlights" set, as the name would suggest, features 54 highlights of players and pitchers of the month for the American League and National League. The final two cards of the set were devoted to American League and National League Rookies of the Year chosen by Donruss. Dick Perez provided the artwork for the 3½" by 6½" "Hall of Fame Sluggers" set. Players for this set were chosen by their career slugging percentage, and the cards are numbered by the percentages. This is the first and last time Donruss would make this type of set. The "Super Diamond Kings" are enlarged, measuring approximately 4 15/16 by 6¾", versions of the first 26 cards of the standard set, and were obtained through mail-order. The other two cards featured a checklist card and one of artist Dick Perez. A Lou Gehrig puzzle piece was also included in the mail-order.

Donruss produced a "Leaf" set to establish themselves in the Canadian baseball card market along with rival Topps' affiliate O-Pee-Chee. These cards are similar in appearance to the standard set, but are numbered differently and the backs are in both French and English. Card numbers 251 and 252 feature Dick Perez artwork of Dave Stieb and Tim Raines, respectively, and are not found in the standard set. Wax packs of this set also contained Lou Gehrig puzzle pieces. Donruss released this set at a later date in the U.S.

Donruss logo used from 1986 to 1995

Donruss' 1986 baseball card sets didn't deviate much from 1985. The standard 660-card set featured Hank Aaron puzzle pieces inserted into wax packs. Again, Donruss issued cards on the bottom of wax boxes. The 60-card "Action All-Stars" changed slightly. The set was now called "All-Stars" and featured players that were involved in the 1985 Major League Baseball All-Star Game. Cards were very similar to the standard set, and backs of the cards displayed each players All-Star game statistics. Similar to the 1985 and 1986 wax boxes, the All-Star Boxes featured four standard-size cards, styled the same as the standard set, on the bottom of the box. The 56-card "Highlights" set were given a glossy-coating on the front side of the card. Again, the "Super Diamond Kings" set was available by mail-order and is an enlarged versions of the regular set. This year's set featured an extra card, however. Card 27 is Pete Rose "King of Kings". The other two cards featured a no numbered checklist card and a no numbered card depicting the complete Hank Aaron jigsaw puzzle. The 264-card "Leaf" set had the same differences as the previous year's set. However, this year card numbers 214 and 254 feature Dick Perez artwork of Jeff Reardon and Jesse Barfield, respectively, and are not found in the standard set.

Two new sets were introduced in 1986. 18-card "Pop-Ups" and 56-card "Rookies". The "Pop-Ups" measured 2½" by 5" and features the first 18 players of the "All-Star" set. The cards were die-cut and folded in a manner that when we unfolded, or "popped up", could stand on its own and give the appearance of a player in action in front of the Hubert H. Humphrey Metrodome ballpark background. For the cards to remain in mint condition, card collecting guides recommend not unfolding the cards. The "Rookies" were issued in factory set form and came with 15-piece jigsaw puzzle of Hank Aaron.

All of the 1986 sets were used again in 1987, with a few differences. The standard set put a checklist card at #27, so the Rated Rookie cards now occupied 28 through 47. Roberto Clemente debuted as the jigsaw puzzle pieces inserted into wax packs, and the 1987 factory sets contained a complete puzzle set. Perez-Steele Galleries started using repeats of the Diamond King (1-26) sections, to avoid depleting their limited pool of available players. There was no change to the "All-Stars" set. 1987 marked the last year Donruss issued cards on the bottom of the regular set and "All-Stars" boxes, and the last year Donruss released a "Highlights" set. "Pop-Ups" increased from an 18-card to 20-card set. "Rookies" replaced the previous year's 15-piece jigsaw puzzle with Roberto Clemente. "Super Diamond Kings" decreased from a 29-card set to a 28-card set, excluding card 27 this time. Again, the other two cards featured a no numbered checklist card and a no numbered card depicting the complete Roberto Clemente jigsaw puzzle. The year's "Leaf" set featured artwork by Dick Perez on card numbers 65 and 173, Floyd Youmans and Mark Eichhorn, respectively. Again, those cards were not in the U.S. set. 1987 was the last year Donruss released enlarged versions of the "All-Stars" and "Pop-Ups" sets.

Donruss introduced one new 272-card set for the year called "Opening Day". The set featured a card for every player in the starting line up on Opening Day. Like the "Rookies" set, the "Opening Day" set contained a 15-piece jigsaw puzzle of Roberto Clemente. A notable card in this set is a Barry Bonds' error card with Johnny Ray pictured instead of Bonds. Donruss did issue a card to correct the error. 1987 was the only year Donruss issued an "Opening Day" set.

In 1988 Donruss started distributing a new set within its standard 660-card set. In addition to finding the usual jigsaw puzzle piece, the year's being Stan Musial, bonus cards, numbered with a BC prefix, were randomly inserted into wax packs. These cards had an MVP logo on the face of the card to distinguish them from the regular set; and created a new 26-card "Bonus MVP" set, featuring the most valuable player from each Major League Baseball team. This did, however, create a problem for both sets. Rather than producing extra packaging materials to ship the extra cards, Donruss pulled cards from both sets to make room. This meant 26 cards from the regular set were in shorter print, cards 648 through 660 more so than the other thirteen; and cards BC14 through BC26 were in shorter print from the "Bonus MVP" set. The short printed cards did not have a significant effect on the cards values.

Also new to 1988 is a 336-card set called "Baseball's Best" and 27-card "Team Books" of the A's, Cubs, Mets, Red Sox and Yankees. "Baseball's Best" was issued late in the season and sold in big-box stores as a complete factory set. Six 15-piece jigsaw puzzles of Stan Musial are included in every factory set. Each "Team Book" was issued with 27-cards (3 pages with 9 cards) and a large, perforated full-page puzzle of Stan Musial. These cards are identical to the standard set cards, but copyrighted 1988 rather than 1987, distinguishing the cards from the regular set. Donruss did not issue "Team Books" again.

Donruss produced their "All-Stars", "Pop-Ups", "Rookies", "Super Diamond Kings" and "Leaf" sets again in 1988 with a few differences. Previous years "All-Stars" and "Pop-Ups" enlarged sets were now produced in the standard 2½" by 3½" card size. "All-Stars" increased from a 60-card set to a 64-card set. No other changes to the "Pop-Ups" set. The "Rookies" set replaced this year's 15-piece jigsaw puzzle with Stan Musial. Donruss did not include extra cards in "Super Diamond Kings", making this a 26-card set. Dick Perez artwork is used, again, in the "Leaf" set on two cards, George Bell (213) and Tim Wallach (255), which were not issued in the U.S. set. Two "Bonus MVP" cards, Tim Raines (211) and George Bell (214), were issued in both the Canadian and U.S. versions of the "Leaf" set. 1988 was also the last year Donruss issued a "Leaf" set produced specifically for a Canadian, and later U.S., release.

Donruss released many of the same sets in 1989, and three new sets. The base set remained 660-cards. Again, Donruss released "Bonus MVP" cards randomly inserted into regular set wax packs, along with a jigsaw puzzle piece of Warren Spahn. Donruss did not short print any cards this year. The factory set contained 672-cards. A 12-card "Grand Slammers" set accompanies the regular 660-card set as an added incentive to purchase a factory set. The "Grand Slammers" set contained players who hit one or more grand slams in 1988. "Grand Slammers" were also found in cellophane-wrapped packaged (cello pack) cards.

The other new sets for 1989 were a 12-card "Blue Chips" and a 56-card "Traded" set. The 12-card "Blue Chips" set is identical to the "Grand Slammers" set, except in the place of the "Grand Slammers" logo is a "Blue Chips" logo with a Donruss or Leaf trademark. These cards were not issued in factory sets, and are not commonly found among collectors. The "Traded" set was issued in factory form, featured players that traded teams and card numbers began with a T prefix. 1989 was the first and last time "Blue Chips" and "Traded" sets were produced.

"All-Stars", "Baseball's Best", "Pop-Ups", "Rookies" and "Super Diamond Kings" were produced again in 1989, with a few items of note. No changes to the "All-Stars" set, but Donruss would not make this particular set again until 1995. Once again, "Baseball's Best" was sold in big-box stores as a complete factory set. Notable card in this set is Sammy Sosa, Donruss was the only company to release a licensed major league baseball card of him in 1989. Donruss would not produce a "Baseball's Best" set again until 2001. "Pop-Ups" increased from a 20-card to 42-card set, and was the last year Donruss produced the set. The "Rookies" set replaced the year's 15-piece jigsaw puzzle with Warren Spahn. There were no changes to the "Super Diamond Kings" set.

=== Increased competition and market saturation ===
Throughout the 1980s, the baseball card market boomed, with new collectors getting into the hobby as well as speculators hoarding cards in hopes of selling them off later for a tidy profit. Unfortunately, as the "Big Three" ramped up their production numbers, new brands like Sportflics, Score and Upper Deck crowded the marketplace.

Donruss baseball cards were produced continuously from 1981 to 1998, when its then-parent Pinnacle Brands filed for Chapter 11 bankruptcy. Playoff Inc. then purchased the Donruss name and produced Major League Baseball sets again from 2001 to 2005, when Major League Baseball and the MLB Players Association revoked the company's production license. It also produced NHL hockey cards from 1992 until 1998, and NFL football cards since 1996. Today, Donruss Playoff LP produces NFL football cards and NBA basketball cards, along with a line of baseball draft picks products and entertainment cards.

=== End of an era ===
In the late summer of 2005, Major League Baseball created new license criteria for cardmakers in response to collectors' complaints that the market had become too fragmented and confusing; and that rookie cards were becoming too scarce, with diminished importance due to the race between makers to feature unknown players first. MLB chose to renew only its licenses with Topps and Upper Deck, tacitly sealing the fate of Donruss and Fleer. The last MLB-licensed baseball product shipped by the company was the third series of the Playoff-branded Prime Cuts memorabilia cards.

In late 2007 however, Donruss did release Donruss Elite Extra Edition, which is its first product outside of the NFL. This product was a multisport release that included cards of the top 30 picks in the 2007 MLB Amateur Draft. Since this product was not licensed by Major League Baseball, the players from the 2007 MLB Amateur Draft were pictured in their high school or college uniforms and existing Minor Leaguers had their uniforms airbrushed to remove all marks. In addition, there are a number of collegiate themed cards as well as soccer themes.

In October 2008, Donruss released Donruss Threads Baseball, featuring a balance of Hall of Famers and young stars. Again, players were either featured in their high school/college uniforms or were photographed so as to make the team logo not visible. The cards also included only the city of the ballplayer, with no mention of the team associated. Donruss used its advantage of not having an MLB license to include baseball cards of both Joe Jackson and Pete Rose, who were banned from baseball for allegedly throwing the World Series in the Black Sox Scandal and betting on the game, respectively. The product included game-used bat cards for Jackson as well as autographed and memorabilia cards from Rose.

In 2011, Panini revived the Donruss Baseball line with cards that are licensed by the Major League Baseball Players Association, but not MLB, which omit team names, identifying them solely by cities, and airbrushing out team logos and word marks from photos.

== Summary of baseball cards ==
=== Donruss Hall of Fame Diamond King puzzle inserts (1982–92) ===
- 1982 Donruss: Babe Ruth
- 1983 Donruss: Ty Cobb
- 1983 Donruss Action All-Stars: Mickey Mantle
- 1984 Donruss: Duke Snider
- 1984 Donruss Action All-Stars: Ted Williams
- 1985 Donruss: Lou Gehrig
- 1986 Donruss: Hank Aaron
- 1987 Donruss: Roberto Clemente
- 1988 Donruss: Stan Musial
- 1989 Donruss: Warren Spahn
- 1990 Donruss: Carl Yastrzemski
- 1990 Leaf: Yogi Berra
- 1991 Donruss: Willie Stargell
- 1991 Leaf: Harmon Killebrew
- 1992 Donruss: Rod Carew

=== Donruss "King of Kings" ===
In addition to their trademark Diamond Kings subset/insert set, Donruss recognized several "King of Kings" for extraordinary achievements. They include:

- 1986: Pete Rose, for breaking Ty Cobb's career hits record.
- 1990: Nolan Ryan, for his 5,000th career strikeout.
- 1994: Dave Winfield, for reaching both 3,000 hits and 400 home runs.
- 1996: Eddie Murray, for becoming only the third player to reach both 3,000 hits and 500 home runs.
- 1996: Cal Ripken Jr., for breaking Lou Gehrig's consecutive games record.

== See also ==
- Panini Group
- Fleer
- Topps
- Upper Deck
- Pinnacle Brands
- O-Pee-Chee
- Trading card
