= Dick Perez =

American painter

- Born: 1940 (age 85–86); San Lorenzo, Puerto Rico
- Education: Philadelphia College of Art
- Known for: Paintings of baseball
- Notable work: Baseball HOF; Philadelphia Phillies
- Style: Realism
- Website: dickperez.com

Dick Perez (born 1940) is an American artist known for his baseball paintings for the National Baseball Hall of Fame and Museum and the Philadelphia Phillies. He is also known for his paintings for various baseball card series. Perez's 2010 book The Immortals: An Art Collection of Baseball's Best, offers a visual history of the then-292 members of the Baseball Hall of Fame.

== Overview ==
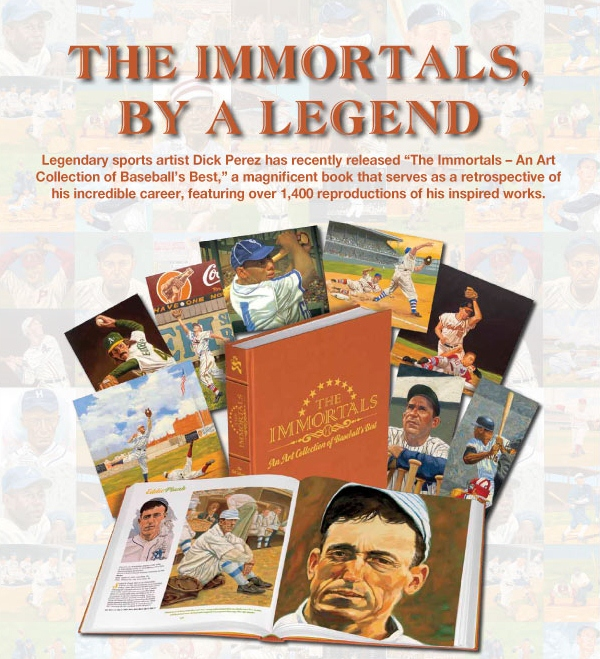
Cover for The Immortals: An Art Collection of Baseball's Best by Dick Perez, published in 2010

He is a native of San Lorenzo, Puerto Rico. He moved to New York City at age six and to Philadelphia at age sixteen where he studied at the Philadelphia College of Art and the University of Pennsylvania.

Perez's art was on exhibit at the Pennsylvania Academy of Fine Arts in Philadelphia in 2004. It was the only one-man show dedicated to sports art at that institution. There is now a permanent exhibit of the 33 paintings (the original 32 plus an additional one of Pat Gillick, who was inducted into the Hall of Fame in 2011) in the Hall of Fame section at Citizens Bank Park.

He has been the official artist for the Philadelphia Phillies since 1982 and was the official artist for the Major League Hall of Fame for twenty-five years. Starting in 1982, Perez painted a yearly set of cards for the "Diamond Kings" series for the Donruss Trading Card Co. The paintings were of baseball's premier players. The paintings were in partnership with Frank and Peggy Steele. (The Perez-Steele Galleries). Perez currently paints for Topps baseball cards. Perez's most notable work with Topps are the "Turkey Red" series cards, which featured both active and retired notable players.

His paintings use acrylics, oils, gouache and watercolors. His artistic influences include such greats as John Singer Sargent, Anders Zorn, Joaquín Sorolla, and Diego Velázquez. His works include other sports and non-sports paintings. Perez painted a portrait of Grover Cleveland Alexander for President Ronald Reagan and a Japanese stickball scene for Ichiro Suzuki of the Seattle Mariners. He also painted Arky Vaughan for President Bill Clinton. He was commissioned to paint Robert N. C. Nix, Jr., a former Pennsylvania Supreme Court Chief Justice, for the Pennsylvania Bar Association.

He won a national contest in 1976 for the National League official centennial logo and designed the cover for the 1982 World Series. For Perez, baseball has a rich history with multiple facets (offense, defense, running, catching and pitching) and multiple focal points (the stadiums, the uniforms, the equipment and the fans in the stands). He tries to incorporate all of these elements into his paintings.

== Bibliography ==
- Perez, Dick (2010). The Immortals: An Art Collection of Baseball's Best. Dick Perez (self-published). ISBN 9780692008508.

== Reviews ==
- Kashatus, William C. (July 23, 2010). "A portrait of the portraitist". Philly.com. Archived from the original on November 6, 2013.
- "The Immortals, by a Legend". Sports Market Research. December 26, 2010.
- Abramson, Mitch; Lelinwalla, Mark; Badden, Bill; Samuel, Ebenezer (November 28, 2010). "Christmas Is Just Around The Corner So Daily News Presents Its Holiday Sports Gift Guide". New York Daily News.
- Ahrens, Mark (July 8, 2010). "The Immortals: New Coffee Table Book From Dick Perez".
- Olds, Chris (October 10, 2011). "Dick Perez Takes His Immortals Digital". Beckett.com.
