= American football card =

Type of collectible trading card

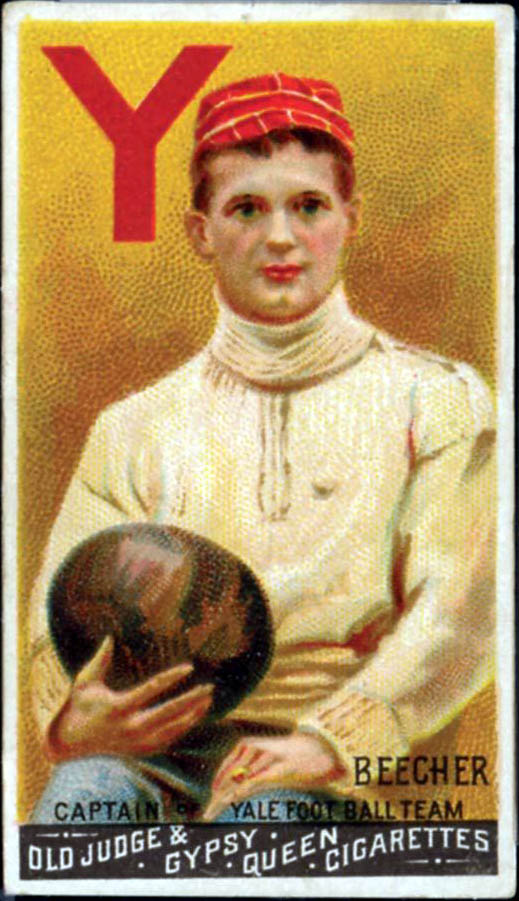
- Harry Beecher on the "Champions Set" by Goodwin & Company, the first American football card set, 1888
- Other names: Football card
- Type: Trading card
- Company: Leaf; Sage; Topps
- Country: United States
- Availability: 1888–present
- Features: American football

An American football card is a type of collectible trading card typically printed on paper stock or card stock that features one or more American football players or other related sports figures. These cards are most often found in the United States and other countries where the sport is popular.

Most football cards features National Football League (NFL) players, but can also feature college football players. Player cards normally list the player's statistics and a narration about their play. Some special edition packs of cards include authentic autographs or jersey cards. Some may include bubble gum or a special edition player card. Many cards are serial-numbered, meaning that there are only so many of that particular card produced. These include unique prints (numbered 1/1). Included in these are printing plates, used in the actual production of the card.

== History ==
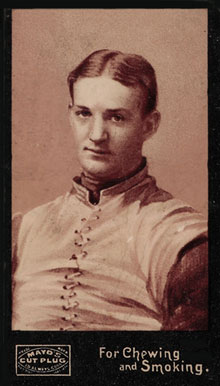
John Dunlop on a Mayo's Cut Plug card of 1894, the first-ever American football card set

The first American football cards were included in cigarette packages in the late 1800s. In 1888 Yale player Henry W. Beecher was included as the only football player in a set of 50 cards distributed in packs of "Old Judge" and "Gypsy Queen" cigarettes by Goodwin & Company., becoming the first American football card ever.

The first entire set of cards to focus on American football players was printed by the Mayo Cut Plug Tobacco Company, which released a 35-card set in 1894, featuring players from the schools that became the Ivy League.

In the early 1900s, trading cards were printed in mixed sport sets, and the football players were generally from college football. They were used to promote other items in addition to tobacco products such as Spalding's sporting goods, breakfast cereal, ice cream, doughnuts and gum.

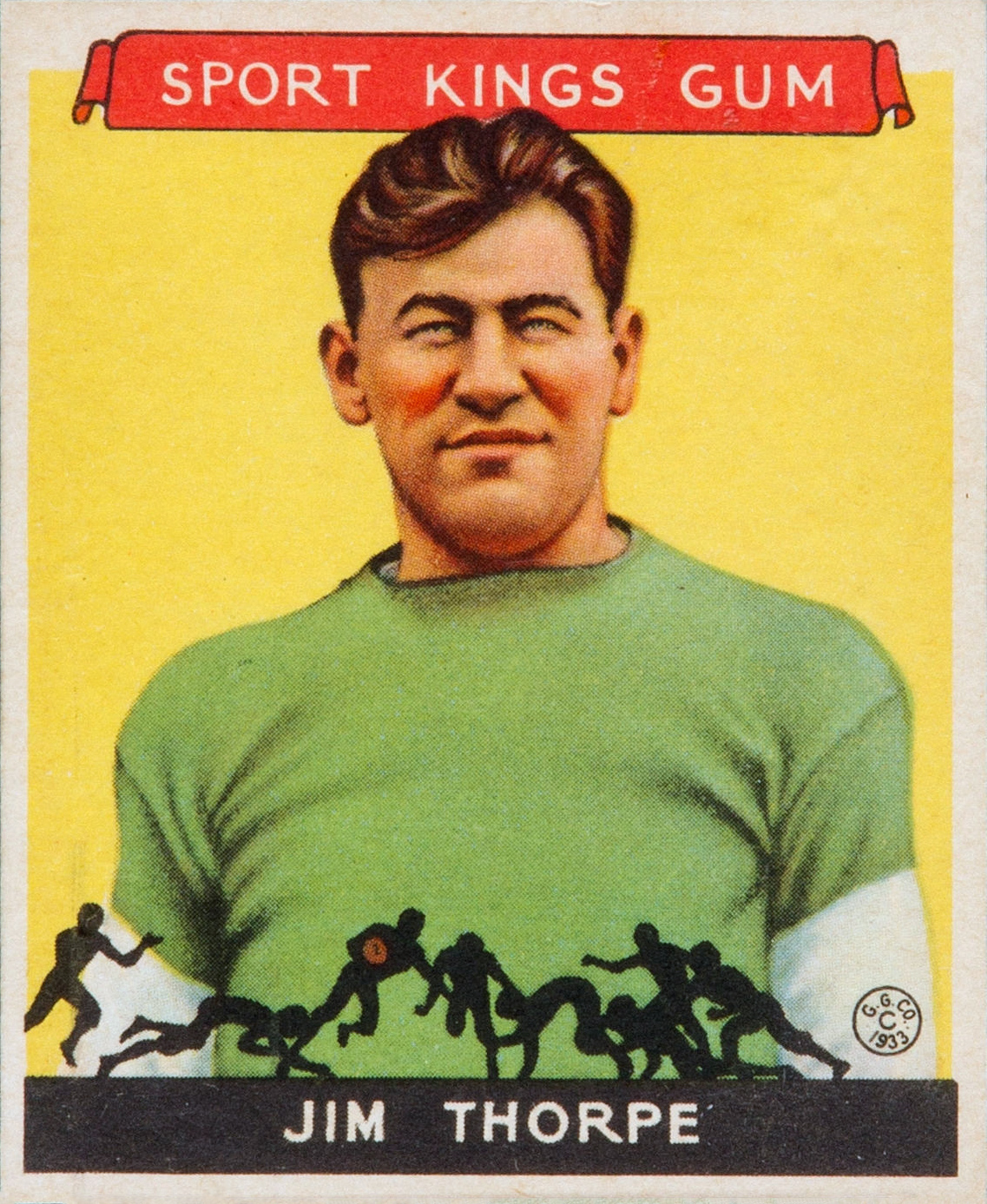
Jim Thorpe on a 1933 Goudey card

The National Chicle Company released its own football set, with only 36 cards, in 1935. It was the first set to feature players from the National Football League, including six Hall of Fame players.

Along with baseball cards, American football cards began gaining popularity after World War II. In 1948, there were two sports card producers, Bowman and Leaf Candy Company. Both produced their first football card sets, each consisting of about 100 cards of then-current players from the National Football League, with the Leaf set including a number of prominent college players. Leaf's set had also the distinction of being the first post-war cards in color.

Leaf only went on to produce one more set, a skip-numbered set in 1949. However, Bowman continued producing sets, from 1950 through 1955. In addition, Topps Chewing Gum Company produced its first set in 1950. Bowman would be bought out by Topps in 1956. That year, Topps produced a new card set (after producing sets of historic college players in 1950, 1951, and 1955).

Fleer entered to the market in 1960, producing football cards of American Football League, then switching to NFL until Philadelphia Gum secured the rights for football cards in 1964.

In 1962, a cereal manufacturer, Post Cereal, released its first football cards set, which could be ordered directly from the company or available from cereal boxes. Another cereal company, Kellogg's, released its first set in 1970. Kellogg's would launch sets regularly until 1983. A new brand, Score, entered into market in 1989 with its collection of football cards. Two years later, Upper Deck obtained licenses from the NFL to produce trading cards. Upper Deck established itself so quickly that it rivaled Topps. Upper Deck produced cards under license of the NFL until 2010. In 1992, SkyBox International (a company founded only three years prior) produced its first set of football cards. Collector's Edge was another company that produced football cards in the 1990s.

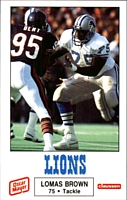
A football card from the 1988 Lions Police football card set of Detroit Lions offensive tackle Lomas Brown

Donruss, a company that had been in the non-sports trading cards market since 1961 manufacturing products related with movies or TV shows, released its football set in 1995, remaining in the business until March 2009 when Italian Panini Group purchased assets of the industry's second-oldest trading card company, Donruss, and formed the new subsidiary, "Panini America".

In 2015, Panini signed a long-term contract with the NFL that secured the company exclusive trading card and sticker rights of the league. But the NFLPA terminated the licensing agreement with Panini in 2023. This is because they signed on with Fanatics, who now owns the rights to produce football cards.

Beginning in the fall of 2022, Topps releases non-exclusive trading cards for U.S. college football and basketball featuring current athletes from approximately 100 colleges. Athletes will not be restricted from signing with other trading card companies. Both schools and athletes benefit from the royalties and royalties paid from the sale of collegiate cards.

== Reception ==
In 2007, one of the earliest known football cards featuring John Dunlop from Harvard, was sold for $10,000, the highest price paid for a football card up to that time.

In their humor book Football Uncyclopedia, Michael Kun and Adam Hoff compare football card collectors to baseball card collectors claiming among other things that "Baseball fans keep their old baseball cards in firm plastic sleeves...[and] include their baseball-card collections in their wills" while "Football fans could not give two craps about collecting football cards" which they present as "Exhibit A for why football fans are smarter than baseball fans."

In January 2014, football cards from the collection of Jefferson R. Burdick, including ones dating to 1894, were displayed at the Metropolitan Museum of Art in New York City.

"In March 2016, veteran sports card dealer Brian Cataquet discovered 1970 Football cards produced by Topps with players wrong names printed on the back of the cards. These cards pictured the correct players photo and name on the front of the card, but on the back of the cards had a different players name printed by error. "There were five in the collection Cataquet acquired: Tommy Nobis front/ Chuck Walton printed on reverse Bill Brown front/ Steve Delong on reverse Rich Jackson front/Bart Starr reverse Roland Lakes front/ Dave Robinson reverse Len St. Jean front/ Dave Rowe reverse"

== Manufacturing companies ==
=== Current ===
- Leaf: 2012–present
- Sage: 1999–present
- Topps: 1950–2015, 2024–present (Note: Topps came back to making unlicensed cards, previously licensed, in 2024.)

=== Past ===
Most of the past producers companies are defunct or have left the trading card business, they are:

- Mayo Cut Plug: 1894
- National Chicle Co.: 1935
- Bowman: 1948–55
- Leaf Candy Co.: 1948–2011
- Fleer: 1960–2005
- Post Cereal: 1962–63 (Note: Card commercialized in both ways, ordering them from the company or available in cereal boxes)
- Philadelphia Gum: 1964–67
- Kellogg's: 1970–83
- Score: 1989–2009
- Pro Set: 1989–94 (Note: Acquired by Leaf, they have been making cards since 2022)
- Upper Deck: 1991–2009
- Collector's Edge: 1992–2000
- Donruss: 1995–2009
- Panini Group: 2009–2026 (Note: Exclusive NFL licensee through American subsidiary "Panini America".)
