= Philadelphia Gum =

American company

Philadelphia Chewing Gum Corp.
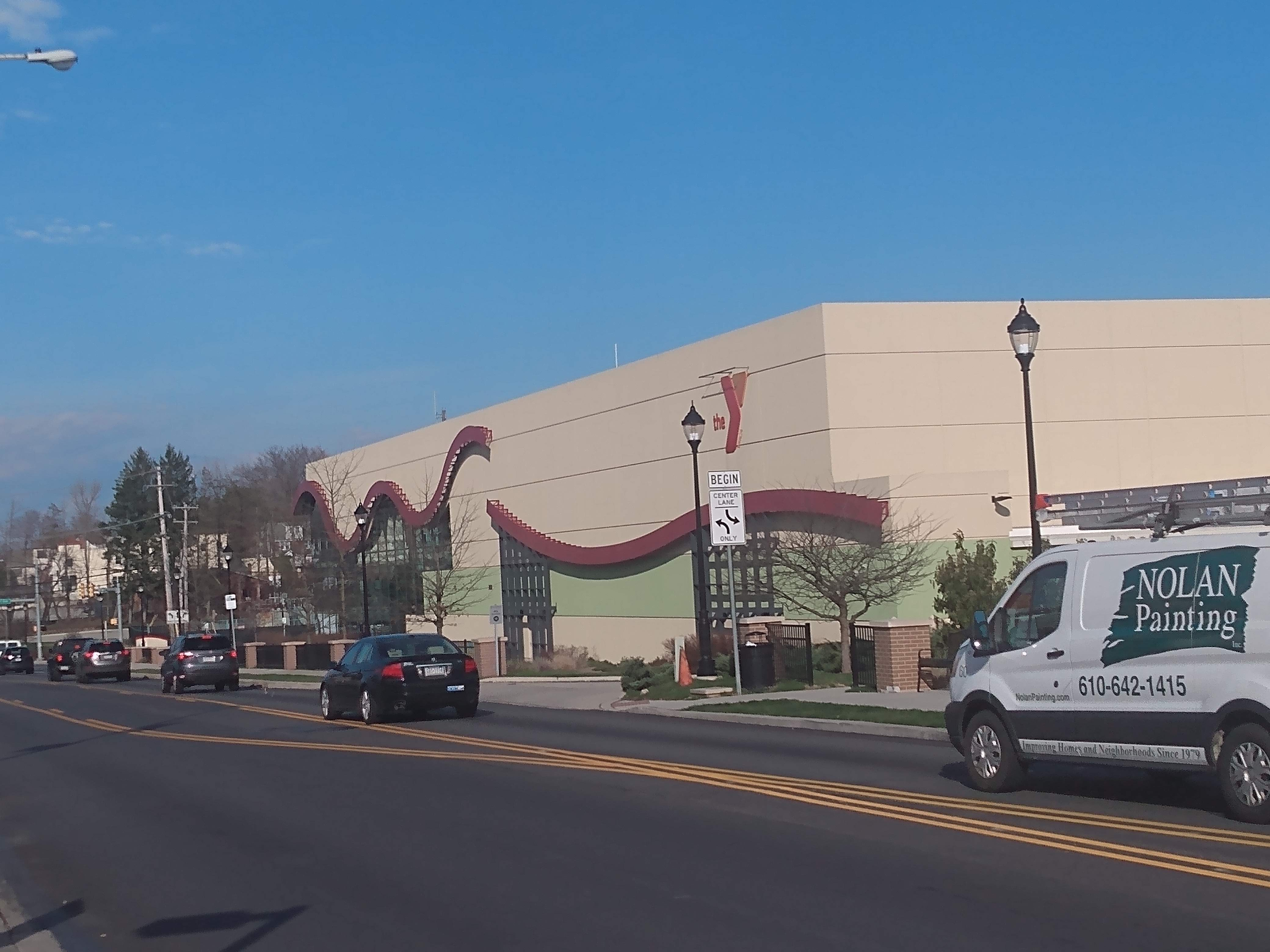
- Haverford YMCA, site of the former Swell Bubble Gum
- Company type: Private
- Industry: Candy, Collectibles
- Founded: August 12, 1947
- Founder: Edward P. Fenimore
- Defunct: 2003; 23 years ago
- Fate: Acquired by Concord Confections
- Headquarters: Havertown, Pennsylvania, USA
- Products: Bubble gum Trading cards

The Philadelphia Chewing Gum Corporation was a Pennsylvania corporation formed on August 12, 1947, to manufacture candy, chewing gum, and specialty confectionery products. The company was also notable for its American Football Cards when in 1964 the company signed a deal with the NFL.

== History ==
The company was established by Edward P. Fenimore, Sr., a former professor of engineering at the University of Pennsylvania and vice president of Bowman Gum Company. The company built its plant in 1948 in Havertown, Pennsylvania. The initial product was the twist-wrapped "Swell" brand pink bubble gum, sold for a penny. The Company then came out with the brown colored "El Bubble" candy cigar that sold for a nickel.

In 1954 the Magic Color chewing gum cigarettes that sold for a dime. During election seasons, the Company sold specialty boxes of chewing gum cigars with the candidates’ names. Other products manufactured by the Company included Cry Baby extra-sour gum, Gold Rocks Nugget Bubble Gum and various other novelty items.

From 1964 to 1967, the company had a license from the National Football League to produce trading cards of leading football players, while Topps produced cards for the rival American Football League (AFL). The company also produced a set of 55 self-adhesive stickers of Marvel Comics superheroes, as well as trading cards based upon "World War II," "Men of the Green Berets," "The Story of Robert F. Kennedy," Daktari, and many others. It briefly produced novelty baseball items, including baseball cards.

Fenimore's son Edward L. Fenimore, Jr., served as president of the Company and for a period, as the Chairman of the National Association of Chewing Gum Manufacturers. His sons, Edward P. II & Richard L., later joined him on the management team, making the company a third generation family owned and operated business.

In July 2003, Concord Confections acquired the Philadelphia Chewing Gum Corporation and its brand names and shortly after closed the Havertown plant. Concord was then acquired by Tootsie Roll Industries in 2004. Recent products include bubble gum cigars aimed at the 2008 presidential election.

All Philadelphia Chewing Gum Corporation products were manufactured in a 200,000-square-foot (19,000 m^{2}) factory in Havertown, Pennsylvania, a western suburb of Philadelphia, Pennsylvania. After the sale of the Company, the Fenimore family retained ownership of the 6.2 acre former plant property, and began negotiating to develop it, proposing to the Township to donate a portion to them for use as a public library site or for other public use; with the remaining part re-zoned for a commercial use.

On March 31, 2009, Haverford Township filed a Declaration of Taking for the condemnation of the former plant property at 891 Eagle Rd. By letter dated June 2, 2009, the Fenimores tendered possession of the property to the Township and requested payment of the "estimated just compensation." On June 19, 2009, the Township directed that the estimated just compensation of $1.26 million be paid to the owners. The Fenimores appealed the decision, and in March 2011, a Delaware County board of view established a fair market value of $6 million for the property.

The vacant plant building was demolished in 2011, and the property was then leased to the YMCA to be developed as the Haverford Area YMCA, a 75,000 square foot state of the art recreation facility that opened in 2013.
