= Pinnacle Brands =

American sports card manufacturer

Pinnacle Brands, Inc.
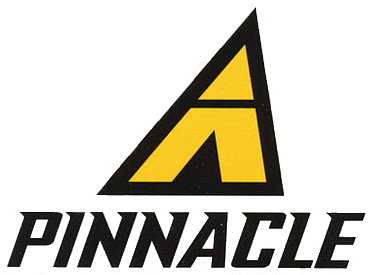
- Type: Private
- Industry: Collectable
- Founded: 1988
- Defunct: 1998; 28 years ago
- Fate: Declared bankruptcy, currently a brand of Panini
- Headquarters: US
- Products: Trading cards
- Brands: Select, Sportflics
- Subsidiaries: Donruss

Pinnacle Brands, Inc. was a US-based manufacturing company of trading cards, focused on sports-related items. Pinnacle produced American football, baseball, hockey and motor sports cards.

Founded in 1986, the company had licenses with several major sports leagues, such as MLB, NFL, NHL, NASCAR, and the WNBA. After going bankrupt, its remaining trading card assets were purchased by Playoff, Inc (now known as Panini America).

== History ==
The company was established in 1986 under the name "Optigraphics, Inc". It specialized in multiple image trading cards using lenticular printing. After producing 3-D cards for Kellogg's for several years, they first released a set of nationally distributed baseball cards called Sportflics in 1986. Two years later, Optigraphics changed its name and released its first proper baseball card set called Score. The Score brand changed the baseball card industry from the "Big Three" (Donruss, Fleer, and Topps) that had been in place for seven years prior. Score's first set used a bold colorful border design (with 110 cards each in red, orange, yellow, green, blue, and violet borders) and was the first major set to have a color mugshot of the player and was the first major set besides 1982 Fleer to have a full color back. The player biographies were by far the most extensive of any major baseball card set of its time. The 1991 and 1992 sets at 900 (1991) 910 (1992) cards were among the largest card sets of that time. The first Score football set in 1989 made even bigger waves for collectors of NFL trading cards.

Pinnacle Brands began production of its first premium quality set, called Pinnacle, in 1991 for American football and 1992 for baseball and used a distinctive black-bordered design for its first two years. Additional key sets, called Select and Zenith began the year afterward. Sportflics cards continued to be produced until 1990, then reintroduced in 1994 as Sportflics 2000. This would be the last set to bear the standard Sportflics name. Pinnacle released re-branded "Sportflix" baseball and football sets in 1995, and then only baseball in 1996, before abandoning the lenticular-based product lines altogether.

=== 1996 to 1997, Acquisitions ===
In 1996, Pinnacle acquired former competitor Donruss. Starting in 1997, Pinnacle Brands randomly inserted in its Pinnacle set and other sets the original individual printing plates hand-signed by Pinnacle's CEO Jerry Meyer, with eight plates per card (both front and back of the card and in each of the four printing colors; black, cyan, magenta, and yellow). The 1998 printing plates were not signed, however. Around this same time, they experimented with the way cards were packaged, selling them in cans (Pinnacle Inside), tin containers (Donruss Preferred), and childproof "blister packs" (several brands).

Action Packed manufactured trading cards from 1988 to 1997. Complete sets consisted of few cards to keep collectors happy when opening packages. Action Packed created a six-card embossed set in 1988 to show its technique to Major League Baseball and the Major League Baseball Players Association. It was not awarded a license. Action Packed created a single set of basketball cards in 1995, produced football cards from 1990 to 1997, produced hockey cards in 1993 and 1995, produced racing cards in 1990 and from 1992 to 1997, and World Wrestling Federation cards in 1994 and 1995. Pinnacle Brands acquired the brand in 1995.

=== Bankruptcy ===
Citing low profits, Pinnacle Brands went out of business in September 1998 and its brand names and trademarks were sold to Playoff, which then became "Donruss Playoff" in 2001. The new company did not use the Pinnacle brand name, but continued to use the Score name on low-end football and hockey sets produced mostly for the retail market. Playoff, Inc. would be later acquired by Panini Group.

== Honors ==
In early 1998, Jerry Meyer was named Beckett Media's Sports Card Executive of the Year. Due to Pinnacle filing for bankruptcy less than a year later, it would be the only time Beckett would give out such an award.
