= Insert card =

- Type: Trading card
- Company: Upper Deck
- Country: United States

An insert card is a card that is randomly inserted into packs of a sports card offering. These insert cards are not part of the regular numbering system of a set of sports cards and they tend to have a unique design. Another term for insert cards is chase cards. Insert cards either have their own numbering system (although some insert cards may have no number). Insert cards are found less frequently than base cards. Autographed cards, memorabilia cards and parallel cards are also classified as insert cards. Insert cards are randomly inserted into packs at a specific ratio. A 1:24 ratio specifies that on average one of every 24 packs will contain a card from that insert set.

== Types of inserts ==
Non-rare to rare cards that are randomly inserted into packs can be inserted in various ratios like 1 per 24 packs. Not only is an Insert Card often different from the main set, but its numbering tends to be different (examples: numbers on the back can be SP1 or SP2). Issuing these cards would not be possible without the approval of both Major League Baseball and the Major League Baseball Players Association.

- A parallel card is a sports card that is identical to a base card in the same sports card offering. The difference is attributed to a visual element. These elements can include foil stamping, a different design, autographs or memorabilia swatches that the base card did not have. Such cards usually have smaller print runs than the original and can lead to the parallel card being worth more than the base card.
- A memorabilia card is an insert card that contains a piece of equipment used by an athlete in an athletic competition, such as part of a bat, jersey or cap. These inserts are often highly prized by collectors.
- An autograph card is an insert card that is autographed by the player.
- Serially numbered cards: Insert cards, memorabilia cards and parallel cards may be serially numbered. The rationale is that each card is numbered sequentially. The serial number of the card is stamped onto the card itself. A card may be numbered 1 of 500.

== Notable inserts ==
- In 1998, the Upper Deck Company purchased a Babe Ruth bat at auction for $23,000 (used by Ruth sometime during the period 1923–31). Upper Deck sliced the bat into approximately 550 tiny pieces that could be affixed to limited edition collector's cards. These cards were randomly inserted into packs of various 1999 Upper Deck card product lines released in late 1998.

These cards were part of Upper Deck's "Pieces of History" promotion. Upper Deck extended the concept to bats of all of the members of baseball's 500 Home Run Club. The set included the 19 members of the elite 500 Home Run Club. Each card had a piece of game used bat on the card and although not serial numbered, each was limited to a print run of 350. This was the true first Game Used Bat set to be created as Upper Deck had already experimented with game used jersey material cards two years earlier in 1997.

There were autographed versions of a few key players. By far the hardest card to find was the Babe Ruth Card. There were two separate Babe Ruth issues, the Piece of History card (Run of 350) and the Piece of History 500 (print run of only 50). These cards were scattered across various Upper Deck 1999 brands and into some year 2000 products. Upper Deck also issued cards of other members that have joined the club over the years. These have included cards of Mark McGwire, Sammy Sosa, Ken Griffey Jr., Rafael Palmiero, Frank Thomas and Jim Thome.

=== Yankee Stadium legacy ===
The Yankee Stadium Legacy set is a 6,500-card compilation chronicling every single game ever played at Yankee Stadium. The card set was manufactured by Upper Deck and made its official debut by being inserted in random packs of Upper Deck's 2008 Series 1 Baseball.

Other cards in the set commemorate some of the most famous sporting events that have taken place at Yankee Stadium. Some of these events include: Lou Gehrig's "Luckiest Man Alive" Speech (July 4, 1939); Babe Ruth's "Final Visit to Yankee Stadium" (June 11, 1948); Joe Louis vs. Max Schmeling heavyweight title bout (June 19, 1936, Schmeling won), the 1958 NFL Championship Game between the New York Giants and the Baltimore Colts and Muhammad Ali's title defense against Ken Norton (Sept. 28, 1976).

The Guinness Book of World Records certified The Yankee Stadium Legacy as the largest baseball card set ever produced, once all the cards were released. The official recognition took place only after all of the 6,500 cards were released in Upper Deck's various baseball card launches throughout the year.

The various sets where the Yankee Stadium Legacy cards were inserted into were: Spectrum; Ballpark Collection; Piece of History; SPx; Upper Deck Series Two; SP Legendary Cuts (Hobby-only); SP Authentic; UDx; and UD Masterpieces. Upper Deck started a website so that collectors could find out more about the Yankee Stadium Legacy set. Alphanumeric codes found on the backs of Yankee Stadium Legacy cards can be entered at the site, and collectors will can use the site to manage their collections online, and track their collections against other collectors via a leader board.

Tommy Baxter, a 36-year-old from Little Rock, Arkansas, was the first collector to put together Upper Deck's Yankee Stadium Legacy (YSL) Collection. Baxter was an avid Cubs fan, and seized the opportunity to become the first collector to piece together the insert set.

=== 20th anniversary program ===
In observance of the 20th anniversary in 2009, Upper Deck released a set that can be found in all of the company's 2009 baseball trading card releases. The massive 2,500 card set commemorated the last twenty years in sports, pop culture, politics, world history and technology. The first cards from the 20th Anniversary Retrospective set were found in 2009 Upper Deck Series One Baseball. An additional element to the set was the 100-card memorabilia set, that was found in all sets beginning with 2009 Upper Deck Spectrum Baseball, (released on February 24).

=== Michael Jordan legacy ===
In April 2009, the company announcement that longtime company spokesman Michael Jordan would be honored with an 1,170-card tribute insert set chronicling every single Chicago Bulls game Jordan played in. The set will begin with his NBA debut on October 26, 1984, through his final Bulls appearance in Game 6 of the NBA Finals on June 14, 1998.

The 1,170-card set will pack out across four 2009 Upper Deck basketball products: Lineage (April 1); Radiance (April 29); Upper Deck (Sept. 22); and First Edition (Sept. 29). Each of the cards will include MJ's specific box score stats from the game in question. The set will be given every card some historical significance as the overall set captures every game Jordan ever played with the Bulls, regular-season and playoff battles included. The cards will fall, on average, 1:4 packs across all four brands.

In addition to the 1,170 Jordan game cards, Upper Deck also included 100 different game-used memorabilia cards, each one crash-numbered to 23. The cards will sport swatches from Michael's game-worn jerseys. More than 100 different action photos showing Michael through the years were used for card front photography.

=== Champs Hockey ===
Upper Deck's Champs Hockey release in 2008–09 featured insert cards with bone fragments from creatures like the woolly mammoth and woolly rhinoceros. Articles such as a woolly mammoth femur, Tyrannosaurus Rex tooth, and Triceratops vertebrae were other items found in the bone fragments cards.
