= Kinney Brothers Tobacco Company =

19th-century tobacco company

Kinney Tobacco Company
- Industry: Tobacco
- Founded: c. 1869
- Founder: Francis S. Kinney
- Defunct: 1890; 136 years ago
- Fate: Merged with other companies to form American Tobacco.
- Successor: American Tobacco
- Headquarters: U.S.
- Key people: Abbot Kinney
- Products: Cigarettes, trading cards
- Brands: Sweet Caporal

The Kinney Tobacco Company was an American cigarette manufacturing firm that created the Sweet Caporal cigarette brand and promoted it with collectible trading cards. Being a leading cigarette manufacturer of the 1870-1880s, in 1890 it merged with other companies to form the American Tobacco Company.

== History ==
During the Depression of 1873–79, the production of cigars, pipe, chewing and snuff tobacco in the United States mostly stagnated; however, cigarette production, took off from 28 million in 1873—to 371 million in 1879. During the first post-depression 1880 year, 533 million cigarettes were manufactured. Until 1880 when James Albert Bonsack invented the first cigarette rolling machine, all cigarettes were rolled manually, on average about four cigarettes per minute by experienced workers.

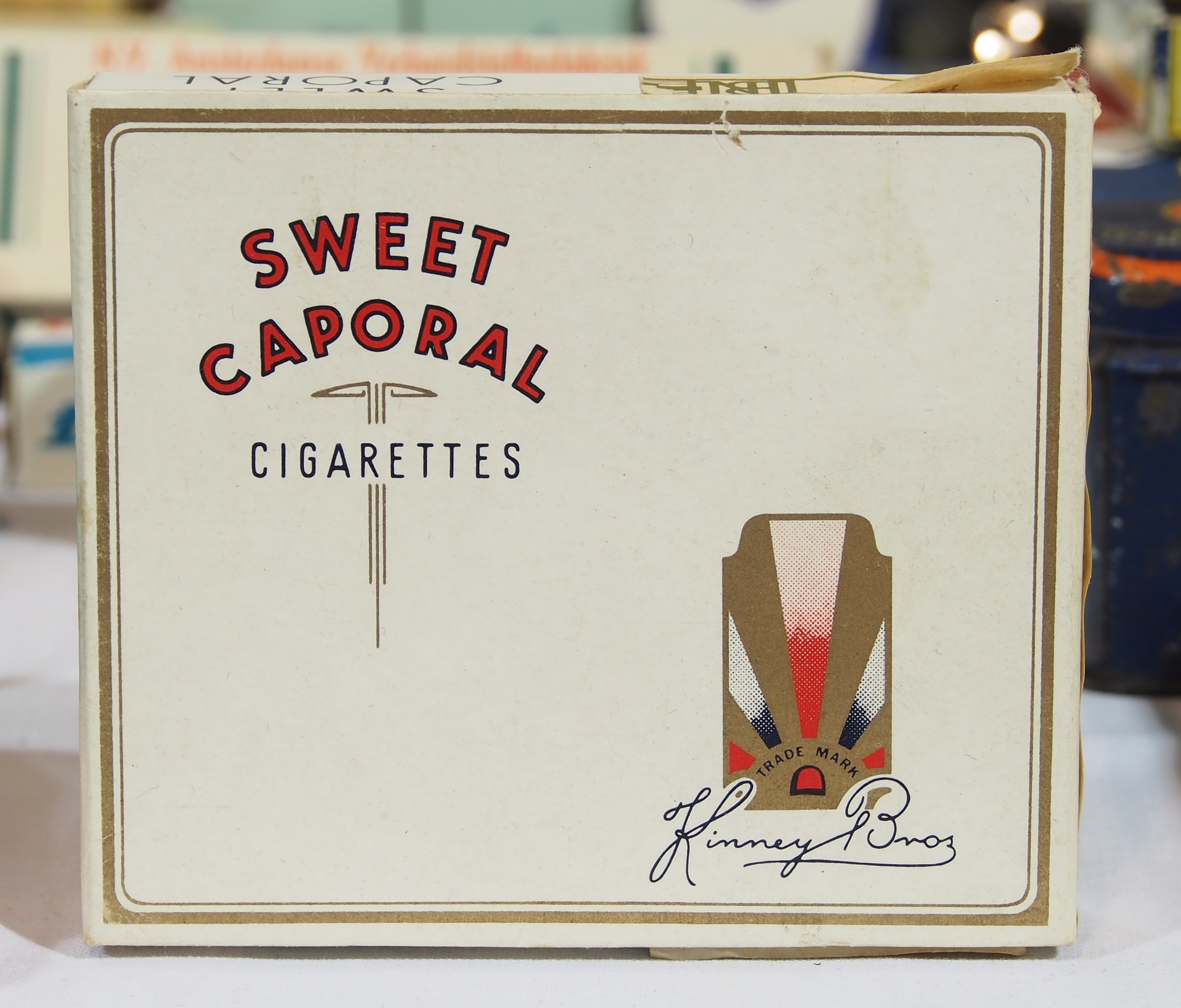
Pack of Sweet Caporal cigarettes.

Seeing the commercial opportunity, Francis Sherwood Kinney, a tobacco manufacturer and founder of the Kinney Tobacco Co. of New York who already experimented with hand-rolled cigarettes starting from 1869, channeled his energies into the mass production of cigarettes with a blend of Turkish and Virginia tobacco in his factories in New York City and Richmond, Virginia. Kinney even invited experienced cigarette-rollers from Europe to serve as instructors. Kinney Tobacco Co. sold cigarettes under the brands of Full Dress, Sweet Caporal, Kinney’s Straight Cut and Sportsman’s Caporal in addition to already established Sweet Caporal Smoking Tobacco. Francis Kinney was joined by his brother, Abbot Kinney and the firm became known as Kinney Brothers Tobacco Company.

In the 1870s, Kinney Tobacco Co. along with Allen & Ginter, Goodwin & Co., W.S. Kimball & Co., Marburg Brothers & Co., and F. W. Felgner & Son Co. formed the Big Six of the American cigarette industry; these six tobacco firms jointly controlled 75 percent of the national cigarette business.

In 1887, Francis S. Kinney patented an apparatus for delivering packages of cigarettes and a machine for applying saliva-proof mouth pieces to cigarettes (with W. H. Butler), as well as distinctive designs for the company's cigarette boxes and cigarette cases. In 1890, the Kinney brothers received $5 million in stock after merging their firm into the American Tobacco Company, which acquired control of 90-percent of the cigarette market in the country, establishing a corporate trust with a near monopoly on cigarette production.

The Kinney Tobacco Co. production facility in New York City was housed in a row of buildings stretching from 515 to 525 West 22nd Street. Additionally, at 513 West 22nd Street there was a salesroom and at No. 529—a five-story building of the packing department built in 1888. The facility on West 22nd Street was known to be able to manufacture 18,000,000 cigarettes weekly.

On October 6, 1892, the Kinney's production and logistics complex on West 22nd Street was gutted by a five-alarm fire. It was supposed that the fire originated around 5:30 a.m. in the basement storage area of the four-story brick building, address No. 521-525 West 22nd Street, from a gas leak that was ignited by a gas-powered chandelier (gasalier). Later, it spread to a five-story brick building No. 527-529 West 22d Street, and onto a four-story brick building No. 513 West 22d Street.

An estimated 40,000,000 cigarettes were destroyed by flame and/or water damage. The loss was estimated at $350,000; later it was adjusted to $243,618.56. Due to the early morning timing of the fire, no one was injured.

== Sweet Caporal ==
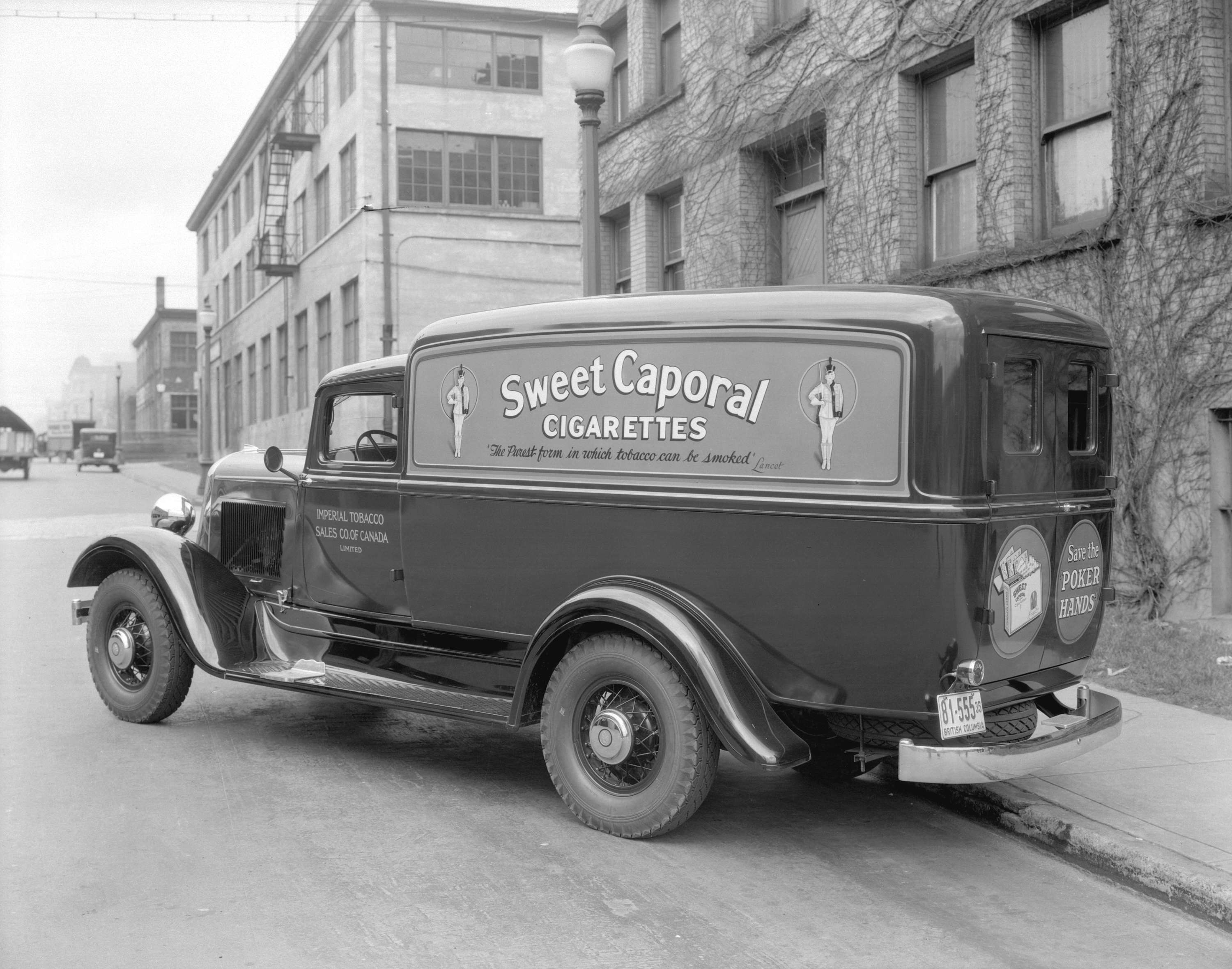
Imperial Tobacco truck advertising Sweet Caporal cigarettes, 1935.

Sweet Caporal launched as a brand in 1878, persevered through a merger and survived the subsequent dissolution of a cigarette trust after United States v. American Tobacco Co. It turned into a money-making brand for the reconstituted American Tobacco Company on a par with Pall Mall and Mecca. At the beginning of the 20th century, it became especially popular in Canada.

American Tobacco Company entered the Canadian market in 1895 by acquiring the Montreal-based American Cigarette Company and D. Ritchie & Co. forming the American Tobacco Company of Canada, Ltd. In 1908, when the American Tobacco Company of Canada was bought out by the Imperial Tobacco Company of Canada, Sweet Caporal cigarettes commanded a 50-percent share of the Canadian market; the brand continued in Canada until 2011.

=== Cigarette cards ===
The original N-series of the Kinney Bro's High-Class Cigarettes cards issued in the 1880s, including the Sweet Caporal brand, featured multiple topics: Actresses, Animals, Heroes of the Spanish War, Military, Fish, Famous Gems of the World, Famous Running Horses, Novelties, Naval Vessels of the World, Butterflies of the World, Flags of All Nations, and Surf Beauties, among others. In the 20th century, Sweet Caporal cigarette cards of the T-series featured baseball and other new themes including 1910 T206 Honus Wagner trading card described by the National Baseball Hall of Fame as the sport's "most famous collectible."

Examples of Cigarette Cards Issued by the Kinney Brothers Tobacco Company

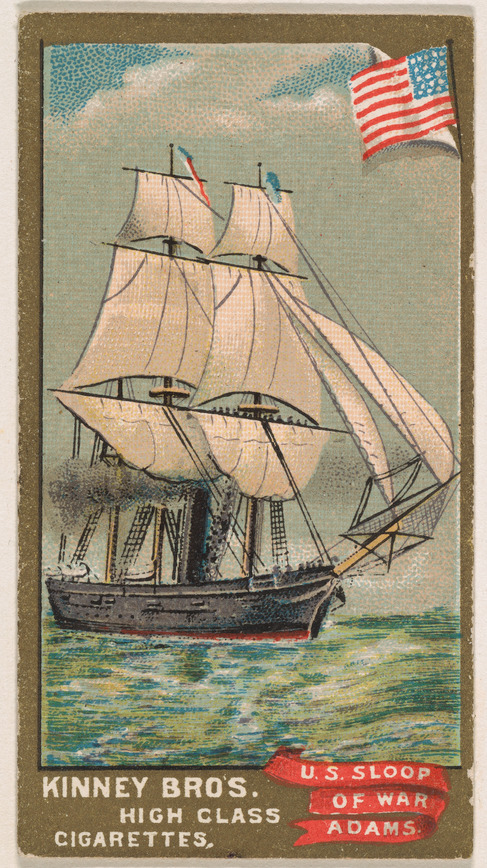

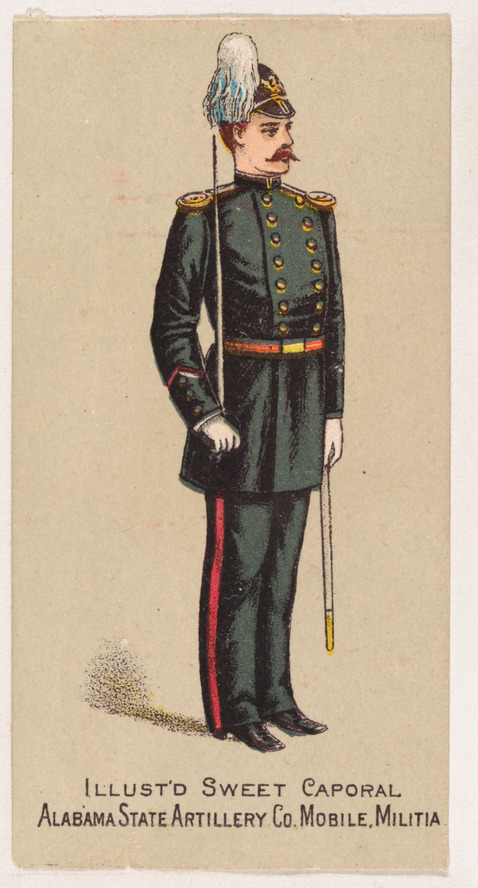

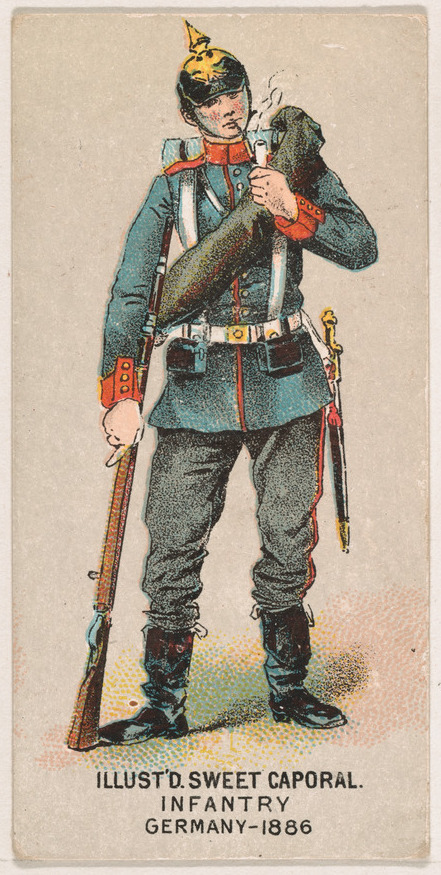

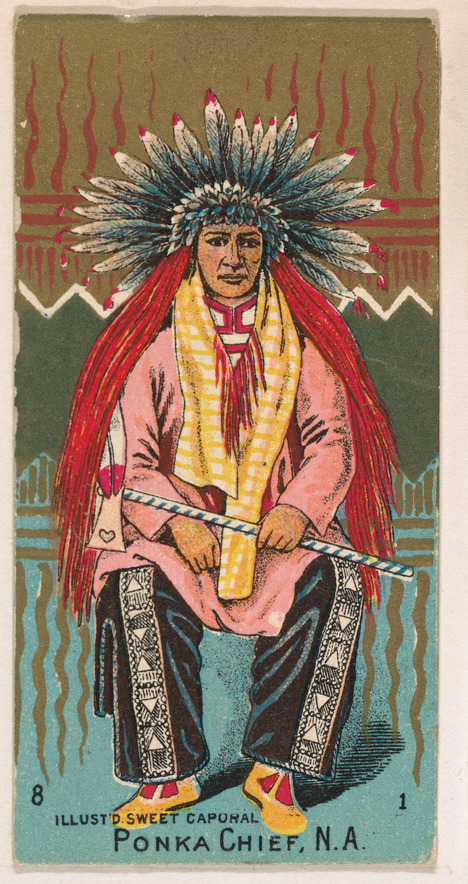

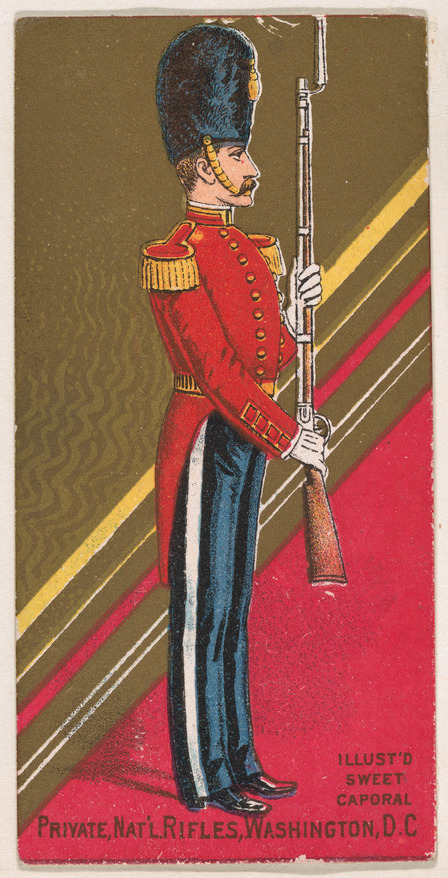
