= George Washington Hill =

American businessman (1884–1946)

- Born: George Washington Hill; October 22, 1884; Philadelphia, Pennsylvania, U.S.
- Died: September 13, 1946 (aged 61); Matapédia, Quebec, Canada
- Resting place: Sleepy Hollow Cemetery
- Spouse: Aquinas Marie Heiler Hill
- Children: Percival Smith Hill II (1922-1981); Mary Hill Fitz Randolph (1924-1985)
- Parent(s): Percival S. Hill (1862-1925); Cassie Rowland Milnes. (1863-1934)

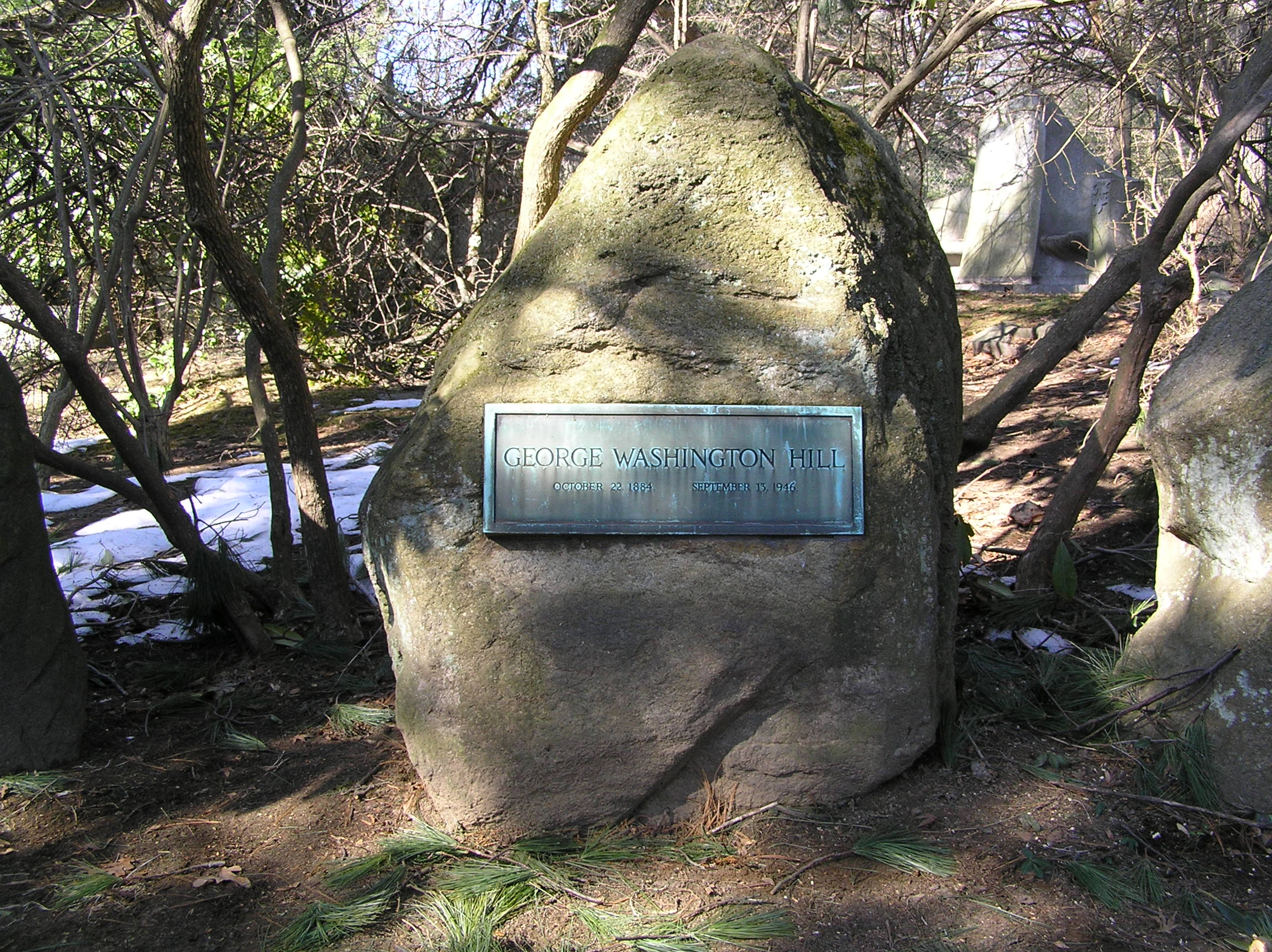
The gravesite of George Washington Hill

George Washington Hill (October 22, 1884 – September 13, 1946) became President of American Tobacco Co. (1925–1946) after his father Percival Hill. He hired public relations expert Edward Bernays to reverse the taboo against women smoking in public, which he did successfully by his advertisement campaigns.

== Early life ==
Hill started his education at Williams College, but left during 1904 before graduating. His father was vice president of the American Tobacco Company and as such George also worked there. After the company acquired the brand of Pall Mall cigarettes, George was responsible for sales and under his management the cigarettes became the most popular among Turkish tobaccos. As a result of an antitrust lawsuit the company was divided into four competing companies in 1911. Senior Hill was the president of the new American Tobacco Company and his son was assigned to be a sales manager. The Lucky Strike brand was introduced five years later by the company and George was in charge of the new brand, designing its advertising and marketing campaigns largely by himself.

== Presidency ==
In 1925 George Hill's father died and he became the new president of the company. A year later Lucky Strike accounted for one fifth of U.S. cigarette sales, and the brand was among the five best-selling US-consumed cigarettes. In 1927 he began directing his marketing efforts toward women, which was a first. The success of the advertising campaign, which used movie actors and singers to promote the brand, can be attributed to Albert Lasker of the Lord & Thomas agency, and Edward Bernays, both of whom were hired by Hill. Lucky Strike soon accounted for 38 percent of U.S. cigarette sales. During the Great Depression the company remained successful and Hill's salary exceeded $2,000,000. He made a substantial investment in advertising and sponsored Your Hit Parade and the Jack Benny Show. He also sponsored Frank Sinatra, Ethel Smith and Lawrence Tibbett.

== Death ==
George Washington Hill died in 1946 at age 61, in Canada's Quebec province. He is interred in Sleepy Hollow Cemetery in North Tarrytown (now Sleepy Hollow, New York).
