= Lee Aubrey "Speed" Riggs =

American tobacco auctioneer (1907–1987)

Lee Aubrey “Speed” Riggs (February 18, 1907 – February 1, 1987) was an American tobacco auctioneer in Durham, North Carolina, United States. For more than three decades, Riggs appeared on the radio shows Your Lucky Strike Hit Parade and The Lucky Strike Program with Jack Benny for the American Tobacco Company as the voice of Lucky Strike cigarettes. Riggs' career came to an end in 1969, when the United States Federal Trade Commission banned tobacco advertising over all forms of broadcast media.

Later in life, Riggs moved to California and started “Your Community Fund,” a nonprofit with the mission to teach handicapped children various labor skills. Riggs is remembered today as a public figure and star performer of the 1940s and 1950s, having gained fame as part of the last generation of mass media tobacco advertisers.

== Biography ==
=== Early years ===
Lee Aubrey Riggs was born on February 18, 1907, in Silverdale, North Carolina — a small community in rural Onslow County. His father, Mark, worked as a tobacco farmer, and in 1921 the entire family moved to Goldsboro, North Carolina, where Mark planted his own tobacco patch and established a truck farming business. Riggs attended school until the sixth grade, when assisting his father in the fields forced him to drop out.

Riggs, however, never gained the same satisfaction growing crops as his father. Riggs discovered his passion while visiting the Faison Produce Auction in Sampson County, North Carolina, where he was awed by the antics and rapid-fire chants of the auctioneers. At just 14 years old, Riggs remembered mimicking the “staccato style…humming Yankee Doodle.” By practicing at such a young age, he trained himself to speak at the staggering pace of 469 words per minute, which was thought to be a world record at the time.

Riggs fondly recalled his years between the ages of fourteen and eighteen, when he would practice his chant daily, slowly edging toward mastery of the craft:

"I would walk up and down fences and sell the fence posts. I would sell mailboxes and trees as we rode by. Sometimes my daddy would threaten me with a beating to get me to stop 'that bunch of noise' I was making. But I wouldn’t stop. I’d just get out of earshot and keep going. Sometimes when I’d get into bed at night, I’d put my head under the cover and hum a chant. Nothing in my life, before or since, captivated me any more than an auctioneer’s chant. I knew one day somebody was going to hire me to sell produce for them."

At age eighteen, Riggs’ dream was finally realized as he began working at the Faison Market as a produce auctioneer. Although he loved the ability to practice his craft, Riggs craved the pace and excitement he saw in the eyes of tobacco auctioneers. For the next few years, however, Riggs was forced to continue to practice and build his reputation at the produce markets until afforded the opportunity for promotion.

=== Liberty Tobacco Warehouse ===
In the late 1800s, the loose-leaf auction system of selling tobacco spread throughout Virginia and The Carolinas. The system eliminated previous methods that allowed swindlers to falsely market barrels of tobacco, coined “hogsheads” and sell them to tobacco companies.

With the new system, farmers first brought their crop to warehouses where it was arranged into piles so that potential buyers could inspect the product. The warehousemen would then hire auctioneers to sell the farmers’ tobacco to the buyers, typically men representing large corporations, such as American Tobacco Company. Auctions grew to be grand events, circus-like in both size and splendor. Many even held beauty pageants after the auctions, naming one lucky young woman the “Tobacco Queen.” As these events became more prevalent, high demand required more skilled auctioneers in order to keep up with the buyers. Between 1870 and 1929, sales per auction went from 75 piles of tobacco per hour to a staggering 400.

Because of the need for quick-tongued auctioneers, Riggs was hired while still in his early twenties by Liberty Warehouse in Durham, North Carolina, as a tobacco auctioneer. The warehouse was one of the largest in the area, spanning the area of the 2.5-acre lot. A wooden placard on the wall indicated each row, and quick-hand calculations from buyers covered the walls. Riggs, however, handled the auction floor with grace and splendor. He understood that auctioneering was an art rather than a science, and gained popularity due to his ability to sell quickly, and at the highest prices. Later in life, he recounted an old trick, where he would get bidders to go higher by ignoring them for one round while looking them dead in the eye, and allowing the sale to go to another bidder.

While Riggs certainly mastered the tricks of the trade, what truly separated him from the rest was his speed, hence the nickname “Speed” Riggs. In his prime, Riggs was able to rhythmically chant his auctioneer's call at 469 words per minute: “31 dollar, 31, 1, ah 1, 32, 2, 2, toodle, toodle, toodle 2,” and so on. Rumors quickly spread throughout the South of the “tall, lanky auctioneer, with big ears and a protruding Adam’s apple, selling in Durham, North Carolina.”

=== Your Lucky Strike Hit Parade ===
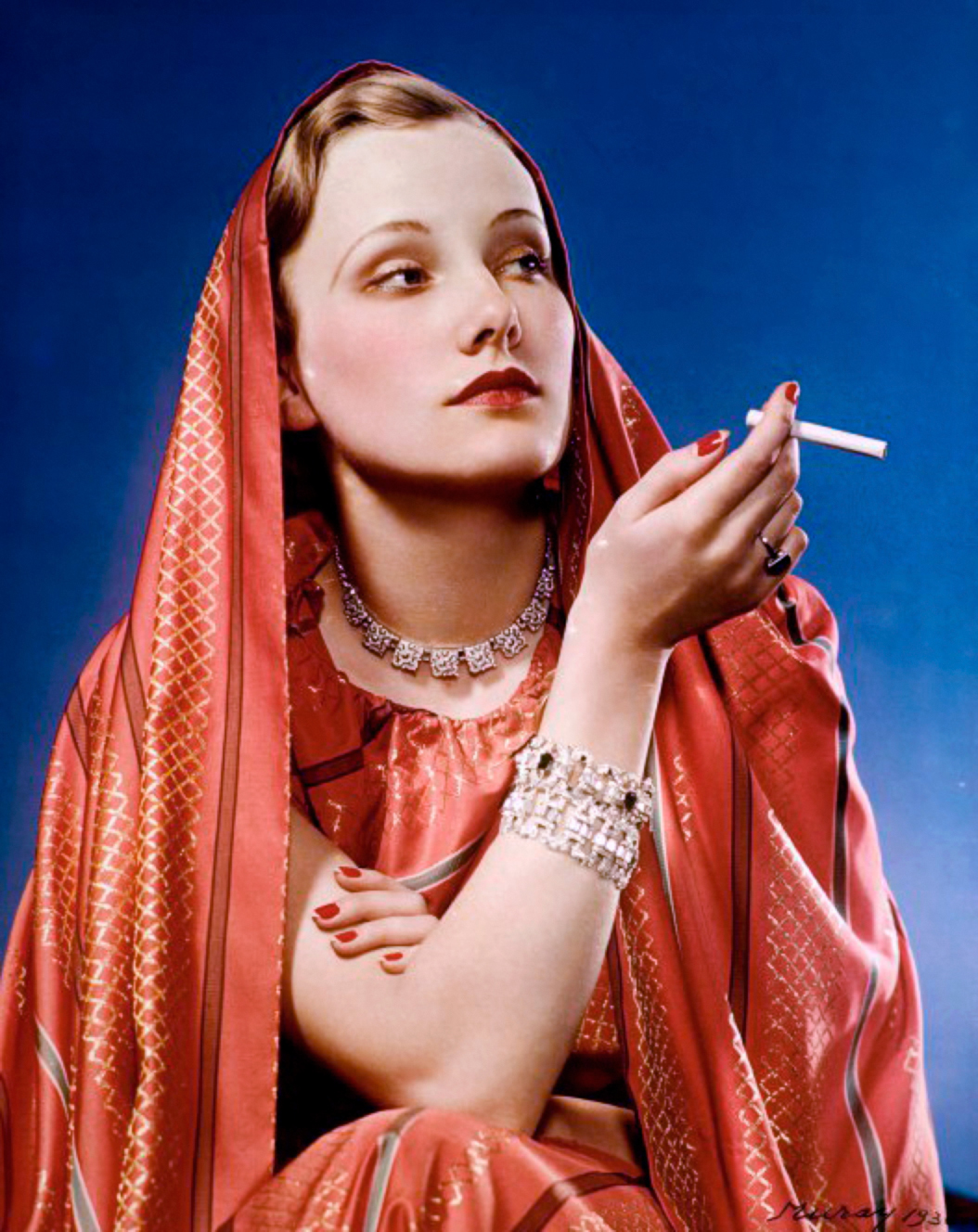
Lucky Strike cigarettes targeted much of its advertising to women from the 1930s onwards, exemplified by this 1936 advertising image.

After being purchased by the American Tobacco Company in 1905, Lucky Strike cigarettes grew immensely in popularity due to aggressive advertising campaigns, an essential practice in the tobacco industry. The rebranding of Lucky Strike Cigarettes began in 1917 when the slogan “It’s Toasted” was created, referring to the tobacco being toasted during manufacturing rather than sun dried to produce a more desirable taste. During the 1920s, Lucky Strike advertising was targeted primarily toward female audiences. A popular advertisement of the time read, “reach for a Lucky instead of a sweet,” encouraging women to smoke one of their cigarettes instead of eating a sweet to aid in weight-loss. These ads had such a large impact that confectioner companies began running competing advertisements claiming that it was still possible to become thin while consuming sweets.

By the late 1920s, George Washington Hill, president of the American Tobacco Company, was spending $7 million per year on advertisements, a number second only to General Motors. Unafraid of competitor's threats, Hill sought to expand his advertisement base beyond women, and began to sponsor a radio show entitled Your Hit Parade in 1935, later changed to Your Lucky Strike Hit Parade. The show was successful, but lacked the necessary talents to push it to the top of the charts. Thus, Hill began a search for the new face of the show to further increase viewership; the man he discovered was Lee Aubrey “Speed” Riggs.

In 1937, news of Riggs’ talent hit Hill's office. Days later, Hill chartered a private train and made his way to Durham from New York City to see Riggs perform his craft. George Washington Hill's interest in watching Riggs auction stemmed from his desire to further the rebranding for Lucky Strike Cigarettes. The main selling product of the American Tobacco Company, Lucky Strikes were regaining popularity and were now close to finally outselling the traditionally more popular Camel brand. Old marketing gimmicks seemed to have lost their appeal with consumers, as coupons and collectable cards no longer drove greater sales.

After seeing Riggs for only a single day, Hill knew that he found the man that would be the new face of his organization. After the day's auctions were done, Riggs poignantly remembered Hill sitting him down, and saying to him, “I like what you got. How’d you like to go to New York with me and be on the radio?” Riggs was initially hesitant, but after receiving another letter from Hill on November 21, 1937, pleading him to come to the city and guest appear on Your Lucky Strike Hit Parade, Riggs agreed.

Riggs debuted on the air December 27 of that same year, imitating his famous auctions, ending each one with the premium brightleaf tobacco being “Sold to American!” Three months later in February, 1938, Riggs’ popularity had grown to the point that he was named the “Voice of Lucky Strike,” and given a twenty-two year $550 per week contract. Within three years, Riggs’ presence helped to catapult Lucky Strike Cigarettes ahead of all other brands by a three to one margin.

Throughout his thirty-three year tenure with Lucky Strike, Riggs' commercial chants were heard on shows with many of the most famous men on radio and television of the era, including Jack Benny, Fred Allen, Kay Kyser, and Jack Paar. Most notably, Riggs’ appeared many times on television advertising Lucky Strike Cigarettes with singer Frank Sinatra. With the aid of Riggs, Lucky Strike was able to broaden their marketing basis and become the industry leader in cigarette sales.

Riggs was also known for using his fame to support charitable causes. For instance, during World War II, Riggs helped raise more than $17 million in war bonds for the United States government, and throughout his career it has been reported that he raised $220 million for various philanthropic organizations.

=== Later life ===
Riggs’ career lasted thirty-three years but was cut short due to government regulation, specifically the passing of the Public Health Cigarette Smoking Act of 1970, banning all tobacco advertising on radio and television. While Riggs never publicly aired frustration over the show being cancelled, his later actions suggest that he was not pleased with the regulation.

In 1981, Riggs began helping industry promotion aimed at winning back smokers, and he outwardly opposed legislation attempting to ban smoking in public areas. Riggs also came out and stated that he did not believe smoking tobacco caused lung cancer, but rather he claimed that "anybody can have cancer of the lungs." That said, it is not absurd to see Riggs’ emotional attachment to the plant that brought him everything: "Tobacco has been good to me. Tobacco helped me climb out of poverty. All my success I owe to tobacco."

After Congress outlawed the advertising of cigarettes on television and radio, Riggs decided to dedicate the remainder of his life, and a good deal of his accumulated wealth, to helping those less fortunate than he. Riggs moved to Fullerton, California, where he established “Your Community Fund”, a nonprofit organization that provides youths with learning handicaps training in skilled labor, particularly furniture-making. For his work in both revitalizing the tobacco industry and contributing his life's earnings to charity, North Carolina honored Riggs in 1982 by having “Speed Riggs Day.”

=== Death ===
On February 1, 1987, Riggs died of congestive heart failure in Goldsboro, North Carolina. He was 79.

=== Legacy ===
While his fame no longer matched that of the 1940s and 1950s, the tobacco industry still hailed him for his many contributions. On February 27, 2003, Riggs was inducted into the North Carolina Agricultural Hall of Fame. Today Riggs is no longer a household name, it is said that whenever an auctioneer throws a bit of zest and style into their chant, it is quite likely mimicking Speed Riggs.

== Sources consulted ==
- “Smoking & Tobacco Use,” Centers for Disease Control and Prevention, accessed March 22, 2014, https://www.cdc.gov/tobacco/data_statistics/by_topic/policy/legislation/
- Billy Yeargin, North Carolina Tobacco (The History Press, 2008), 52–57.
- “Lee Aubrey ‘Speed’ Riggs,” North Carolina Department of Agriculture and Consumer Services, accessed March 14, 2014, http://www.ncagr.gov/paffairs/aghall/riggs.htm.
- Paul Houston, “Auctioneer Sells Whole Industry,” Los Angeles Times, September 14, 1981.
- Charles Gerena, “Sold, American!,” Region Focus 8.2 (2004), 36–39.
- Jennifer Dawn Farley, Duke Homestead and The American Tobacco Company (Arcadia Publishing, 2013), ?.
- “Liberty Warehouse,” Open Durham, accessed April 10, 2014, http://www.opendurham.org/buildings/liberty-warehouse-no-3
- K.L. Lum, J.R. Polansky, R.K. Jackler, and S.A. Glantz, “Signed, Sealed, and Delivered: “Big Tobacco” in Hollywood,” Tobacco Control (2008): 313–323.
- Allan Brandt, Cigarette Century: The Rise, Fall, and Deadly Persistence of the Product (Basic Books, 2007), 74–75.
