= Smith Warehouse =

Historic warehouse in North Carolina, US

- U.S. National Register of Historic Places
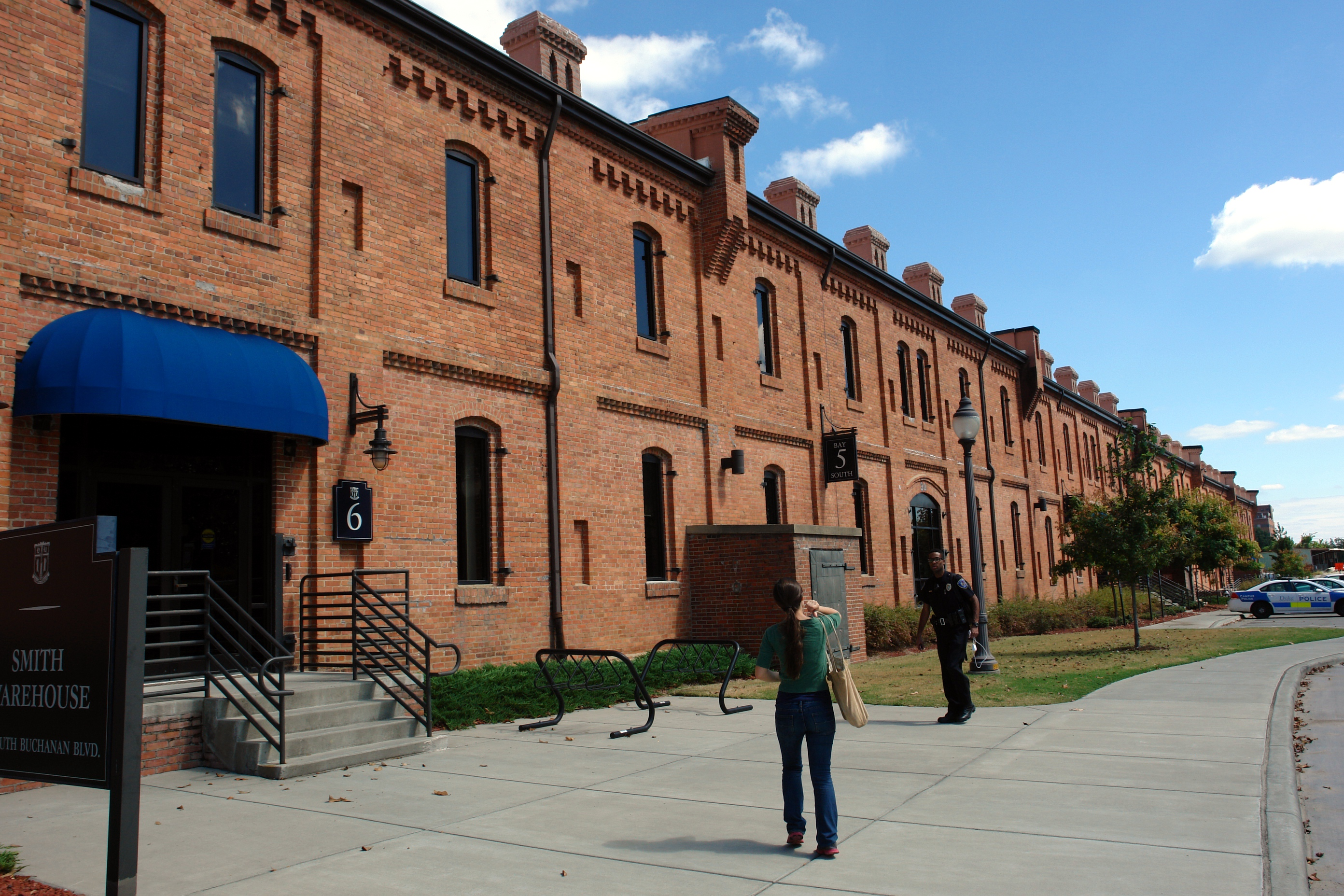
- Smith Warehouse, September 2013

- Location within North Carolina Location within the United States
- Location: 100 N. Buchanan Blvd., Durham, North Carolina
- Coordinates: 36°0′5″N 78°54′57″W
- Area: 5.1 acres (2.1 ha)
- Built: 1906
- Architectural style: Romanesque, Norman Revival
- MPS: Durham MRA
- NRHP reference No.: 85002429
- Added to NRHP: September 16, 1985

Smith Warehouse is a historic tobacco storage warehouse located at Durham, Durham County, North Carolina. It was built in 1906, and is a two-story Romanesque-style brick structure divided into 12 70-foot-wide units by projecting corbeled firewalls. The building measures 850 feet long and 100 feet wide and features ornamental brickwork. It is an example of "slow burn" masonry and wood factory construction. It was the last of the 12 brick tobacco storage warehouses erected by The American Tobacco Company trust beginning in 1897. The building has been converted for academic and administrative uses.

It was listed on the National Register of Historic Places in 1985.
