= American Tobacco Company =

American firm (1890–1994)

Coordinates: 35°59′36″N 78°54′15″W

- Type: Subsidiary
- Industry: Tobacco farming and manufacturing
- Predecessor: Allen & Ginter; W. Duke & Sons; Goodwin & Company; W.S. Kimball & Co.; Kinney Brothers
- Founded: January 31, 1890 in Durham, North Carolina
- Founder: James B. Duke
- Defunct: December 22, 1994; 31 years ago
- Fate: Restructuring and sale to American Brands
- Successor: British American Tobacco
- Headquarters: Durham, North Carolina, U.S.
- Area served: Worldwide
- Key people: George Washington Hill (president, 1925–46)
- Products: Cigarettes and related tobacco products
- Brands: Fatima; Mecca; Sweet Caporal
- Parent: American Brands, Inc. (1969)
- Subsidiaries: Lucky Strike (1905–76)

The American Tobacco Company was a tobacco company founded in 1890 by J. B. Duke through a merger between a number of U.S. tobacco manufacturers including Allen and Ginter, Goodwin & Company, and Kinney Brothers. The company was one of the original 12 members of the Dow Jones Industrial Average in 1896. The American Tobacco Company dominated the industry by acquiring the Lucky Strike Company and over 200 other rival firms. Federal antitrust action begun in 1907 broke the company into several major companies in 1911.

The American Tobacco Company restructured itself in 1969, forming a holding company called American Brands, Inc., which operated American Tobacco as a subsidiary. American Brands acquired a variety of non-tobacco businesses during the 1970s and 1980s and sold its tobacco operations to Brown & Williamson in 1994. American Brands subsequently renamed itself "Fortune Brands".

== History ==
=== Origins ===
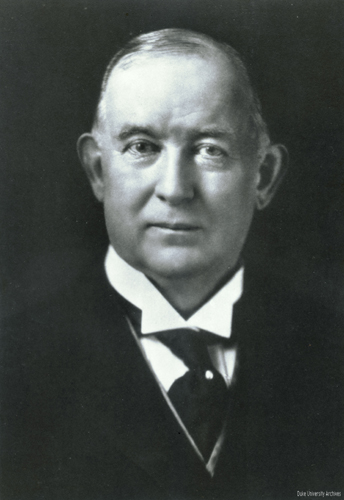
James Buchanan Duke, founder

James Buchanan Duke's entrance into the cigarette industry came about in 1879 when he elected to enter a new business rather than face competition in the shredded pouched smoking tobacco business against the Bull Durham brand, also from Durham, North Carolina.

In 1882, two years after W. Duke, Sons & Company entered into the cigarette business, James Bonsack invented a cigarette-rolling machine. It produced over 133 cigarettes per minute, the equivalent of what a skilled hand roller could produce in one hour, and reduced the cost of rolling cigarettes by 50%. It cut each cigarette with precision, creating uniformity in the cigarettes it rolled. Public stigma was attached to this machine-rolled uniformity, and Allen & Ginter rejected the machine almost immediately.

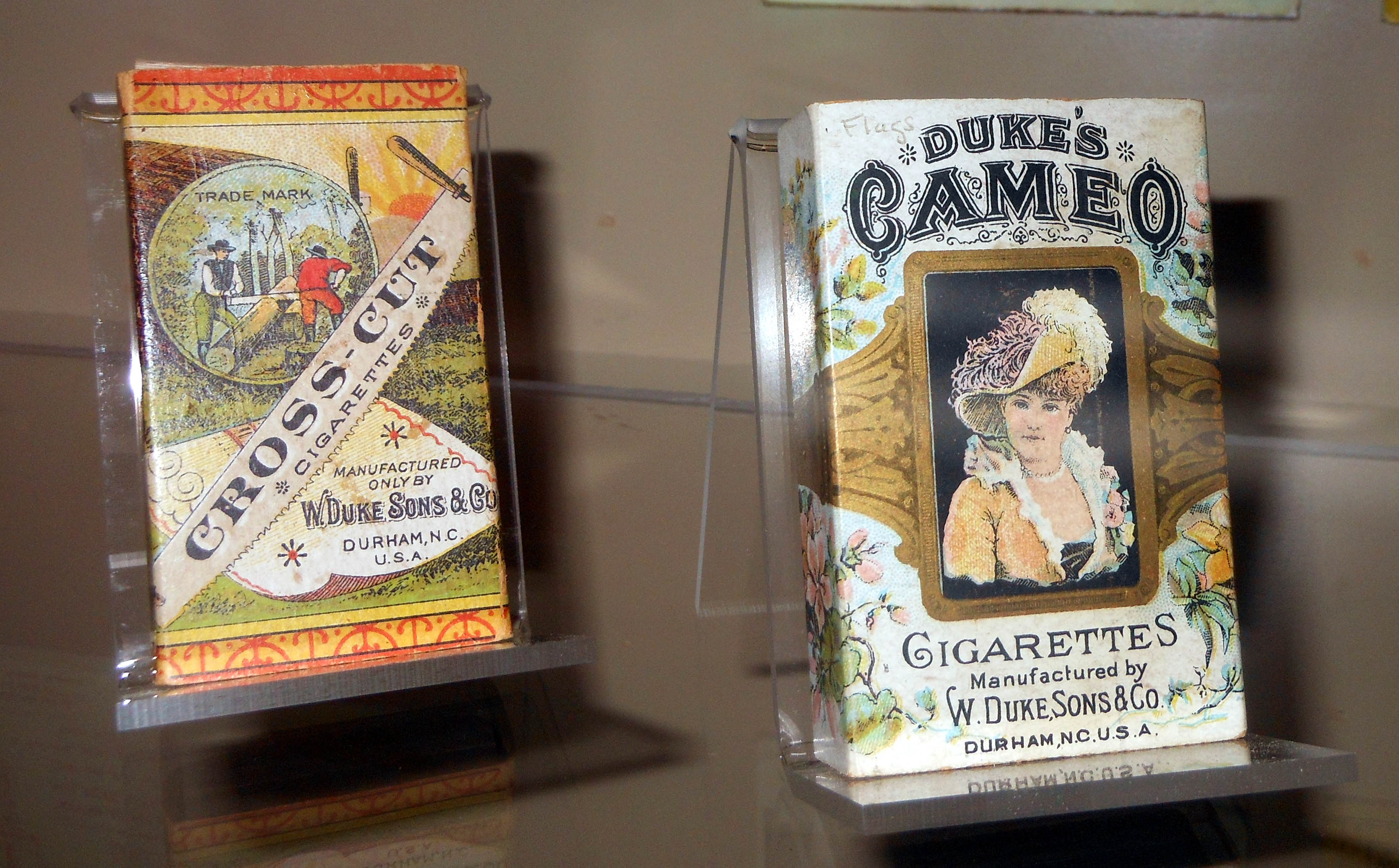
Early Cross-Cut and Cameo cigarette packs by W. Duke & Sons Co

The first Bonsack machine was installed in the Durham Duke tobacco plant on April 30, 1884. Duke set a deal with the Bonsack Machine Company when he installed his machine. Duke agreed to produce all cigarettes with his two rented Bonsack machines and in return, Bonsack reduced Duke's royalties from $0.30 per thousand cigarettes to $0.20 per thousand. Duke also hired one of Bonsack's mechanics, resulting in fewer breakdowns of his machines than his competitors’. This secret contract resulted in a competitive advantage over Duke's competitors; he was able to lower his prices further than others could.

In the 1880s, while Duke was beginning to machine-roll all his cigarettes, he saw that growth rates in the cigarette industry were declining. His solution was to combine companies and found “one of the first great holding companies in American history.” Duke spent $800,000 on advertising in 1889 and lowered his prices, accepting net profits of less than $400,000, forcing his major competitors to lower their prices and, in 1890, join his consortium by the name of the American Tobacco Company. The five constituent companies of American Tobacco: W. Duke & Sons, Allen & Ginter, W.S. Kimball & Company, Kinney Tobacco, and Goodwin & Company – produced 90% of the cigarettes made in 1890, the first year the American Tobacco Company was listed on the NYSE. Within two decades of its founding, the American Tobacco company absorbed about 250 companies and produced 80% of the cigarettes, plug tobacco, smoking tobacco, and snuff produced in the United States. With Duke's market control, American Tobacco grew its equity from $25,000,000 to $316,000,000.

=== The "Tobacco Trust" ===
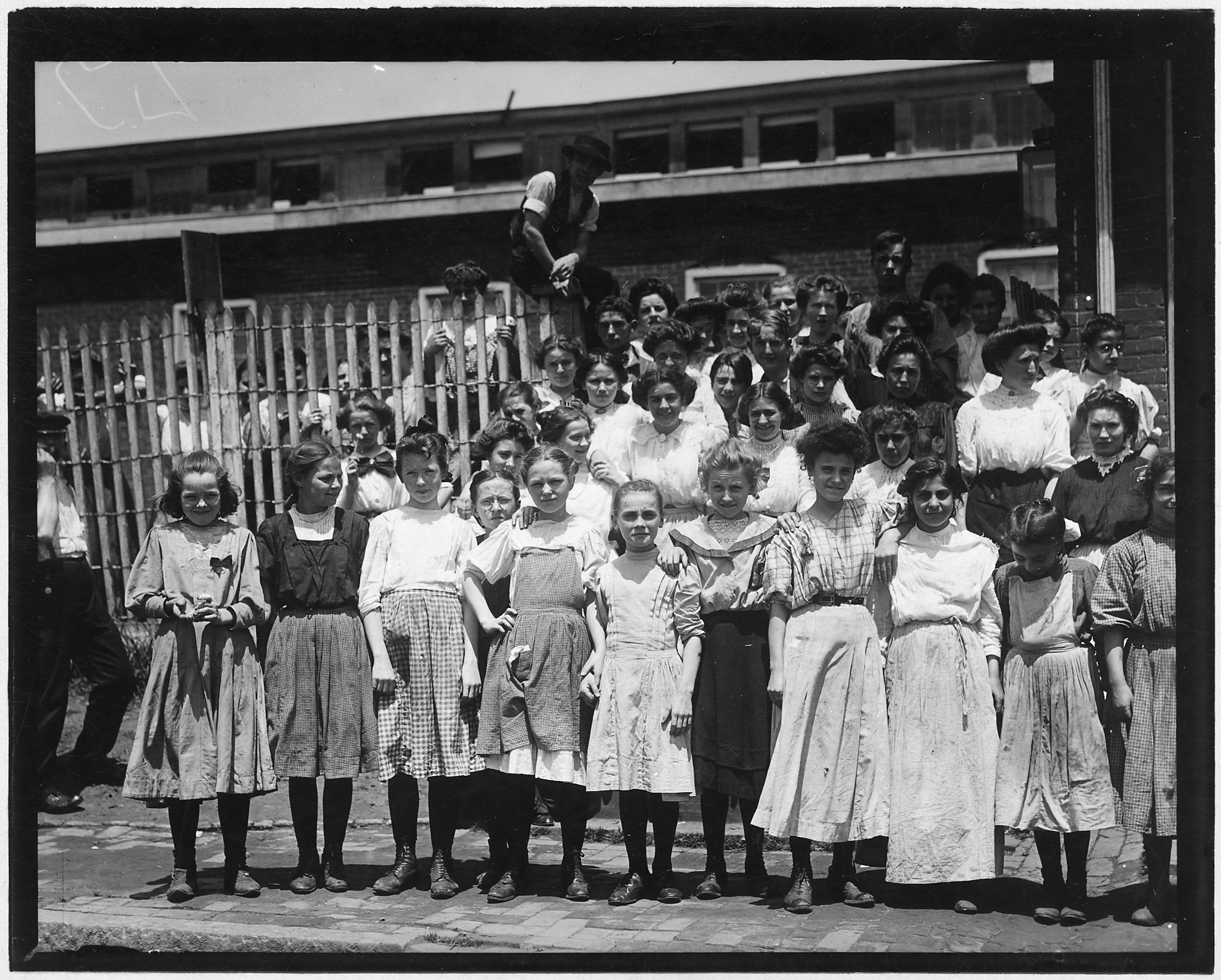
Child laborers at American Tobacco Company in Wilmington, Delaware, 1910, photo by Lewis Hine

American Tobacco Company quickly became known as the “Tobacco Trust” upon its founding. Duke controlled the cigarette market, and his trust caught the attention of legislators in the United States, a country with historical aversion to monopolies.

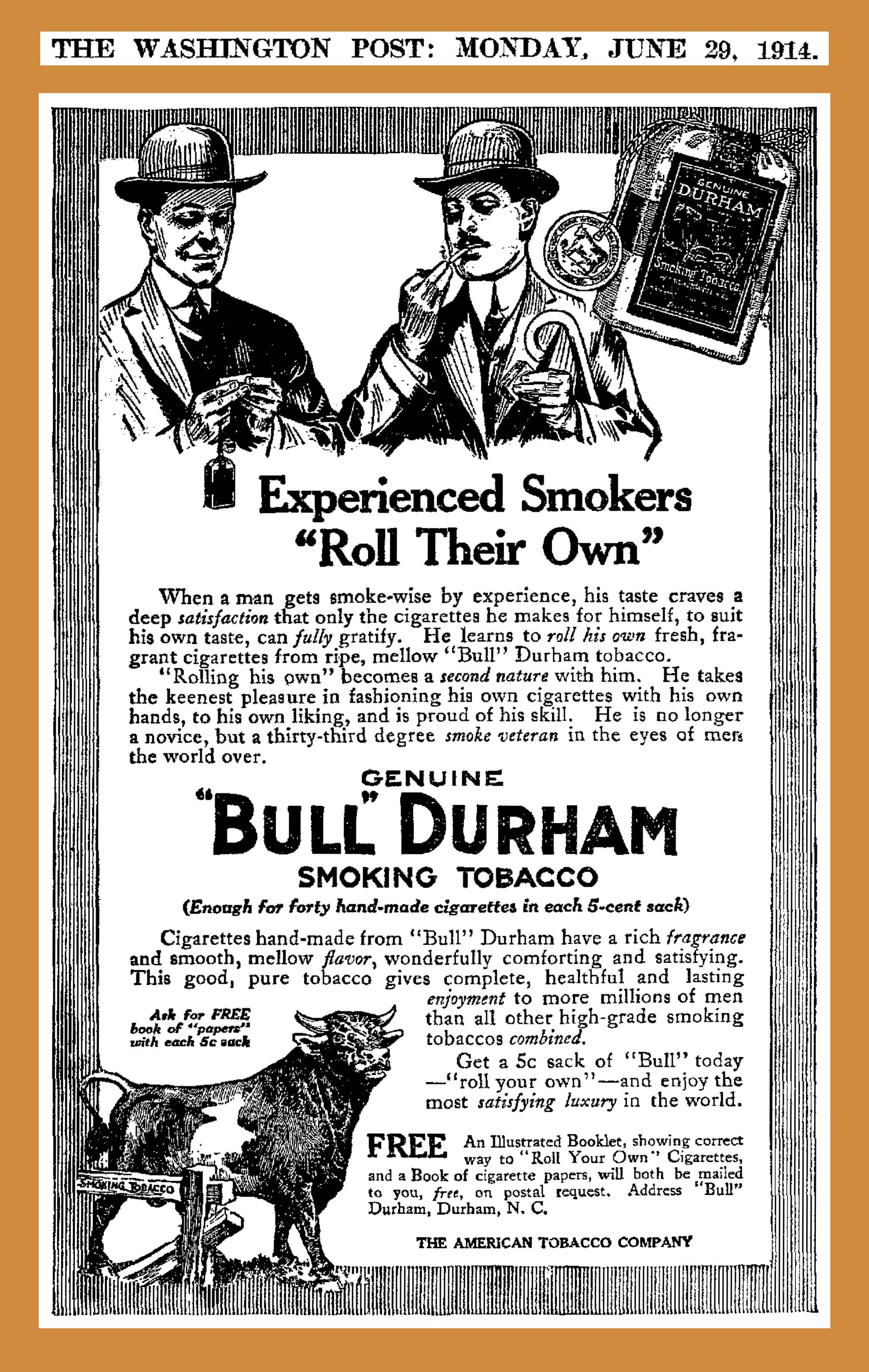
1914 Bull Durham ad appealing to the experienced smoker who prefers to roll his own cigarettes—the "thirty-third degree smoke veteran"

American Tobacco Company focused solely on making and selling cigarettes, leaving growing of tobacco and retail distribution to independent North Carolina farmers. Nonetheless, Duke aimed to eliminate inefficiencies and middlemen through vertical consolidation. Vertical consolidation is the act of buying companies that perform services or produce goods on different parts of the supply chain. The American Tobacco Company began to expand to Great Britain, China, and Japan. The company also maintained an interest in producing other tobacco products in case trends within the cigarette market shifted. Duke wanted to be sure that he would be prepared with a multitude of tobacco styles. While Duke did gain a sort of monopoly over the tobacco industry, the Tobacco Trust's international expansion in conjunction with its consolidation of all types of tobacco “ultimately made the Trust so vulnerable to regulation and judicial dissolution”.

The Sherman Antitrust Act was passed in 1890, and in 1907, the American Tobacco Company was indicted in violation of it. In 1908, when the Department of Justice filed suit against the company, 65 companies and 29 individuals were named in the suit. The Supreme Court ordered the company to dissolve in 1911 on the same day that it ordered the Standard Oil Trust to dissolve. The ruling in United States v. American Tobacco Co. stated that the combination of the tobacco companies “in and of itself, as well as each and all of the elements composing it whether corporate or individual, whether considered collectively or separately [was] in restraint of trade and an attempt to monopolize, and a monopolization within the first and second sections of the Anti-Trust Act.”

=== Dissolution ===
Dissolution proved complicated. The American Tobacco Company had combined many prior companies and processes. One department would manage a certain process for the entire organization, producing brands previously owned by other companies. “Plants had been assigned specific products without regard for previous ownership.” Over the course of eight months, a plan for the dissolution, meant to assure competition among the new companies, was negotiated.

The trust needed to dissolve in such a way that no manufacturer had a monopoly on any type of tobacco product. Investors, holding millions of dollars of securities, also needed to be considered. A large question was how to distribute trademarks and brands between the resulting companies.

The American Tobacco Company's assets were split off into: American Tobacco Company, the existing R. J. Reynolds, Liggett & Myers, and Lorillard. The monopoly became an oligopoly. The main result of the dissolution of American Tobacco Trust and the creation of these companies was an increase in advertising and promotion in the industry as a form of competition.

==== Liggett & Myers ====
Liggett & Myers kept control of these plants: Liggett and Myers, St. Louis; Spaulding and Merrick, Chicago; Allen and Ginter, Richmond; smoking tobacco factory in Chicago; Nall and Williams, Louisville; John Bollman Company, San Francisco; Pinkerton Company, Toledo; W. R. Irby, New Orleans; two cigar factories in Baltimore and Philadelphia, and the Duke-Durham branch of the American Tobacco Company.

==== P. Lorillard ====
P. Lorillard retained the Lorillard properties in addition to S. Anargyos; the Luhrman and Wilburn Tobacco Company; plants in Philadelphia, Wilmington, Brooklyn, Baltimore, and Danville; and the Federal Cigar Company.

== More recent history ==
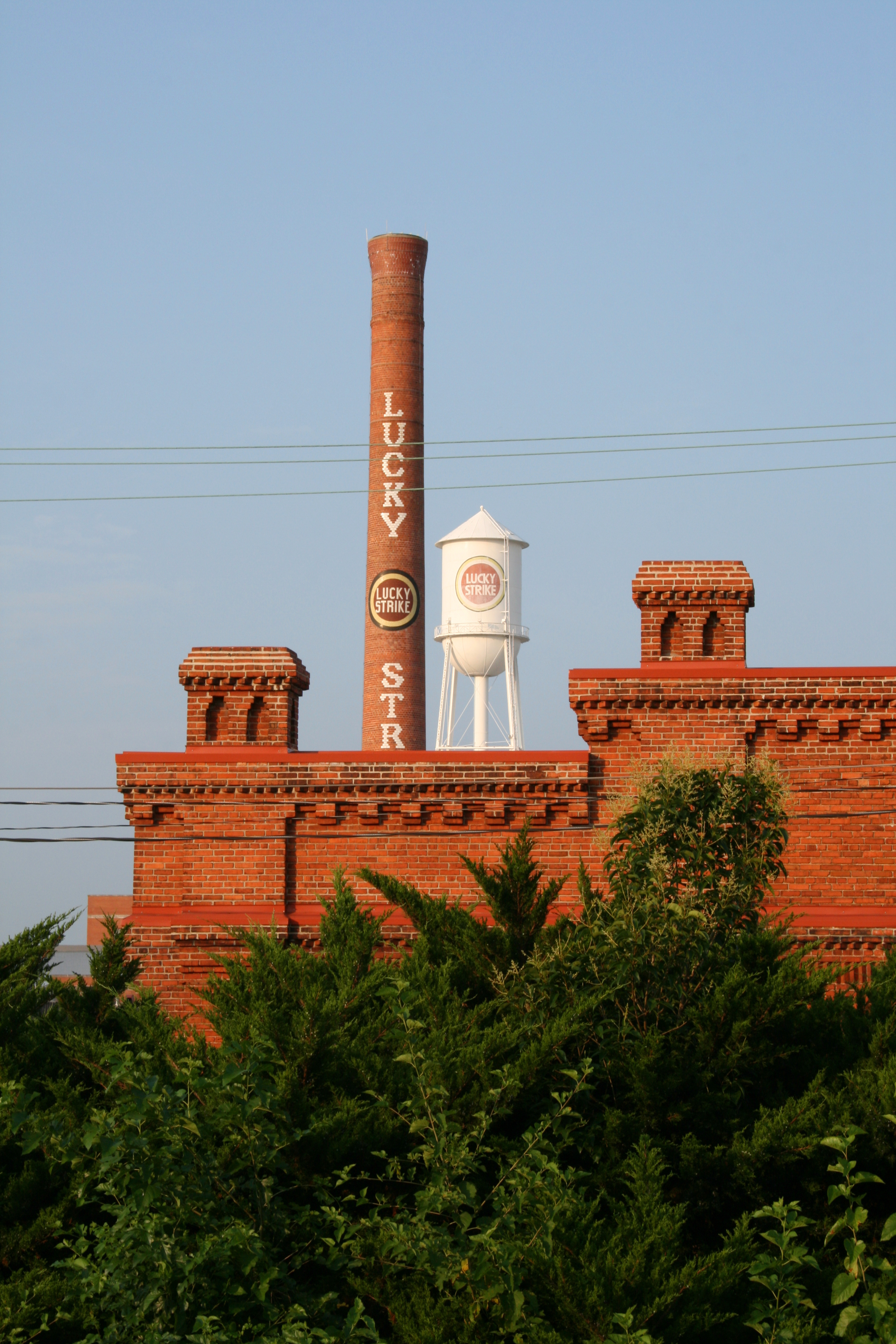
Lucky Strike relics marking the American Tobacco Historic District in Durham, North Carolina, 2008

At the same time as the antitrust action in 1911, the company's share in British American Tobacco (BAT) was sold. In 1994, BAT acquired its former parent, American Tobacco Company (though reorganized after antitrust proceedings). This brought the Lucky Strike and Pall Mall brands into BAT's portfolio as part of BAT's American arm, Brown & Williamson. B&W later merged with R. J. Reynolds Tobacco Company in 2004.

American Tobacco left Durham in the late 1980s. Brown & Williamson took over the Reidsville, North Carolina, operation in 1995 and closed it, costing 1,000 people their jobs, but Commonwealth Brands took it over in a deal completed in October 1996, when the plant had 311 employees, and kept 100 of them. ITG Brands announced November 1, 2018, that the plant would close in 2020.

=== Redevelopment ===
In 2004, the previously abandoned American Tobacco Campus (ATC) in Durham was reopened as a complex of offices, shops, and restaurants. The American Tobacco Campus had been the headquarters of the American Tobacco Company. Developed by Capitol Broadcasting and reopened as the American Tobacco Historic District, phase 1 consisted of the Fowler, Crowe, Strickland, Reed, and Washington Buildings, and included the construction of two new parking garages and a waterfall feature through the center of the campus designed by Smallwood, Reynolds, Stewart, Stewart of Atlanta, Georgia and constructed by W. P. Law, Inc. based in Lexington, South Carolina. Phase 2, consisting of the remaining buildings and expansion of the water feature at the north end of the site, was under construction as of late 2006. Many office spaces in the ATC are now used by Duke University. It was listed on the National Register of Historic Places in 2000 as the American Tobacco Company Manufacturing Plant. The nearby Watts and Yuille Warehouses were listed in 1984 and the Smith Warehouse in 1985.

The American Tobacco Trail, named for the company, is a multi-use rail-trail that begins just south of the Durham complex and runs 22 miles (35 km) towards Chatham and Wake Counties. It follows the route of the railroad (Norfolk Southern Railway (former) Durham Branch) that once served the factories, but was later abandoned when these facilities were shut down.

== Advertising ==
In 1925 George Washington Hill's father died and he became the new president of the company. A year later Lucky Strike accounted for one fifth of U.S. cigarette sales, and the brand was among the five best-selling US-consumed cigarettes. In 1927 Hill began directing his marketing efforts toward women, which was the first female targeted advertising of cigarettes at this time. The success of the advertising campaign, which used movie actors and singers to promote the brand, can be attributed to Albert Lasker of the Lord & Thomas agency, and Edward Bernays, both of whom were hired by Hill. Lucky Strike soon accounted for 38 percent of U.S. cigarette sales. During the Great Depression the company remained successful and Hill's salary exceeded $2,000,000. He made a substantial investment in advertising and sponsored Your Hit Parade and the Jack Benny Show. He also sponsored Frank Sinatra, Ethel Smith and Lawrence Tibbett. In the golden age of radio, as well as early television, American Tobacco was known for advertisements featuring a fast-talking tobacco auctioneer named L. A. "Speed" Riggs. His rapid-fire and song-like patter would always end with the exclamation, "Sold, American!" Another famous tobacco auctioneer, F. E. Boone, was often heard in tandem with Riggs. These cigarette advertisements in conjunction with the cultural change that occurred for women in the United States during the 1920s, made cigarette consumption increasingly prevalent. In fact, not only was the public open to the idea of women smoking cigarettes, but manufacturers boldly advertised and encouraged feminine usage of the cigarette through cigarette cards. The advertising budgets of important cigarette manufacturers such as the American Tobacco Company rapidly expanded until the 1930s when they began to be somewhat moderated by the government.

=== Cigarette cards ===
From the 1870s to the 1940s, cigarette companies often included collectible trading cards with their packages of cigarettes. Cigarette card sets document popular culture from the turn of the century, often depicting the period's actresses, costumes, and sports, as well as offering insights into mainstream humor and cultural norms.

American Tobacco commercialised its cards through several brands, such as Recruit, Mecca, Fatima, Ramly, Turkey Red. Old Judge. Old Mill, among others

Duke & Son's card series
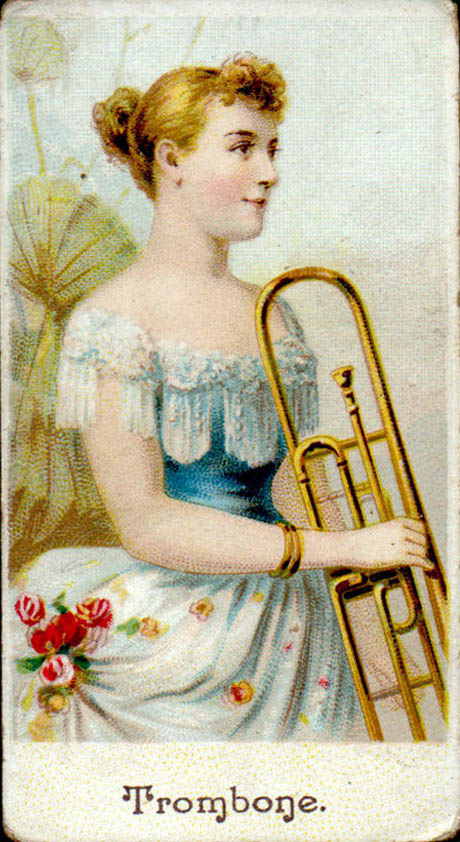
Musical instruments

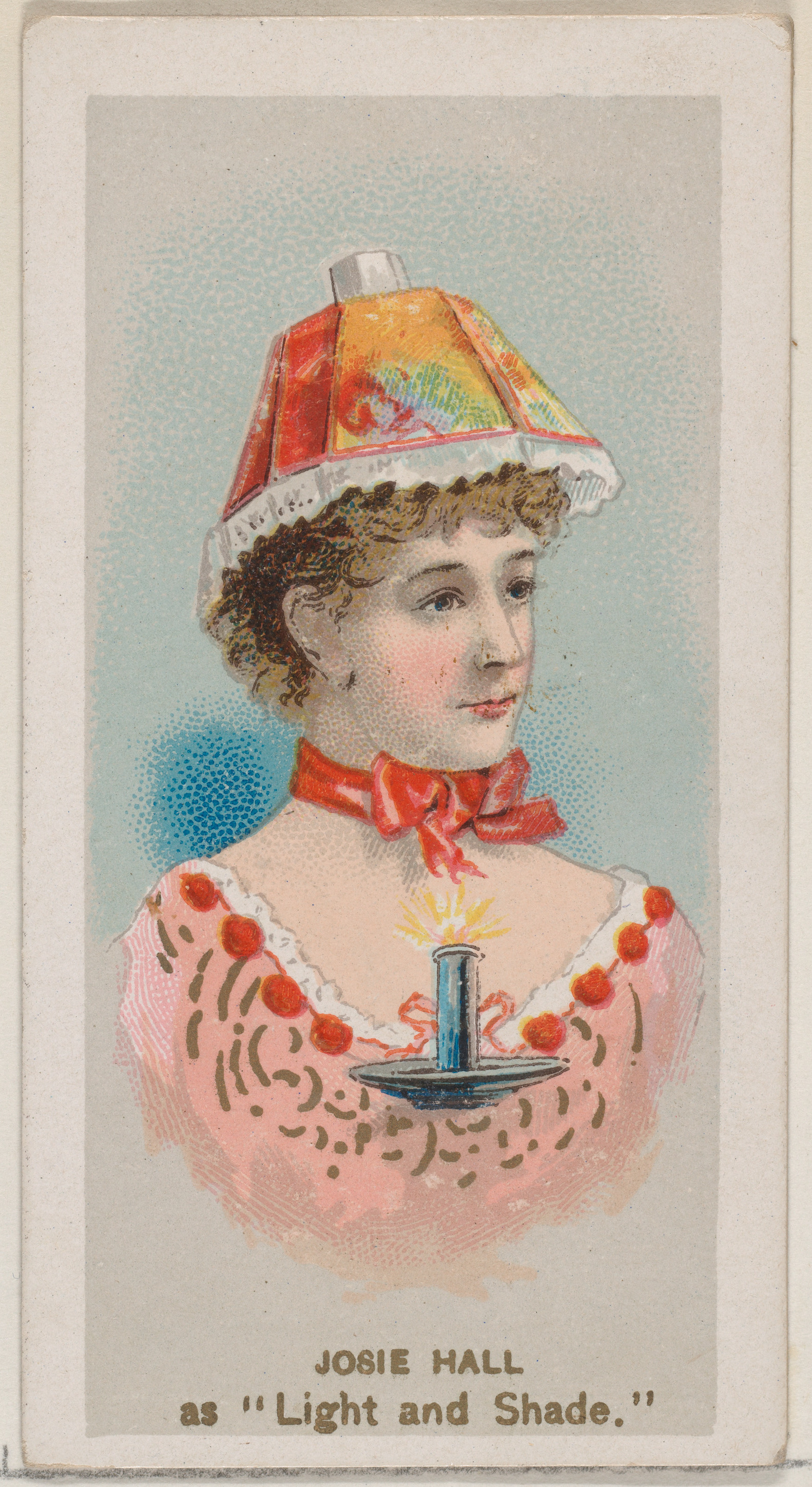
Fancy dress ball costumes

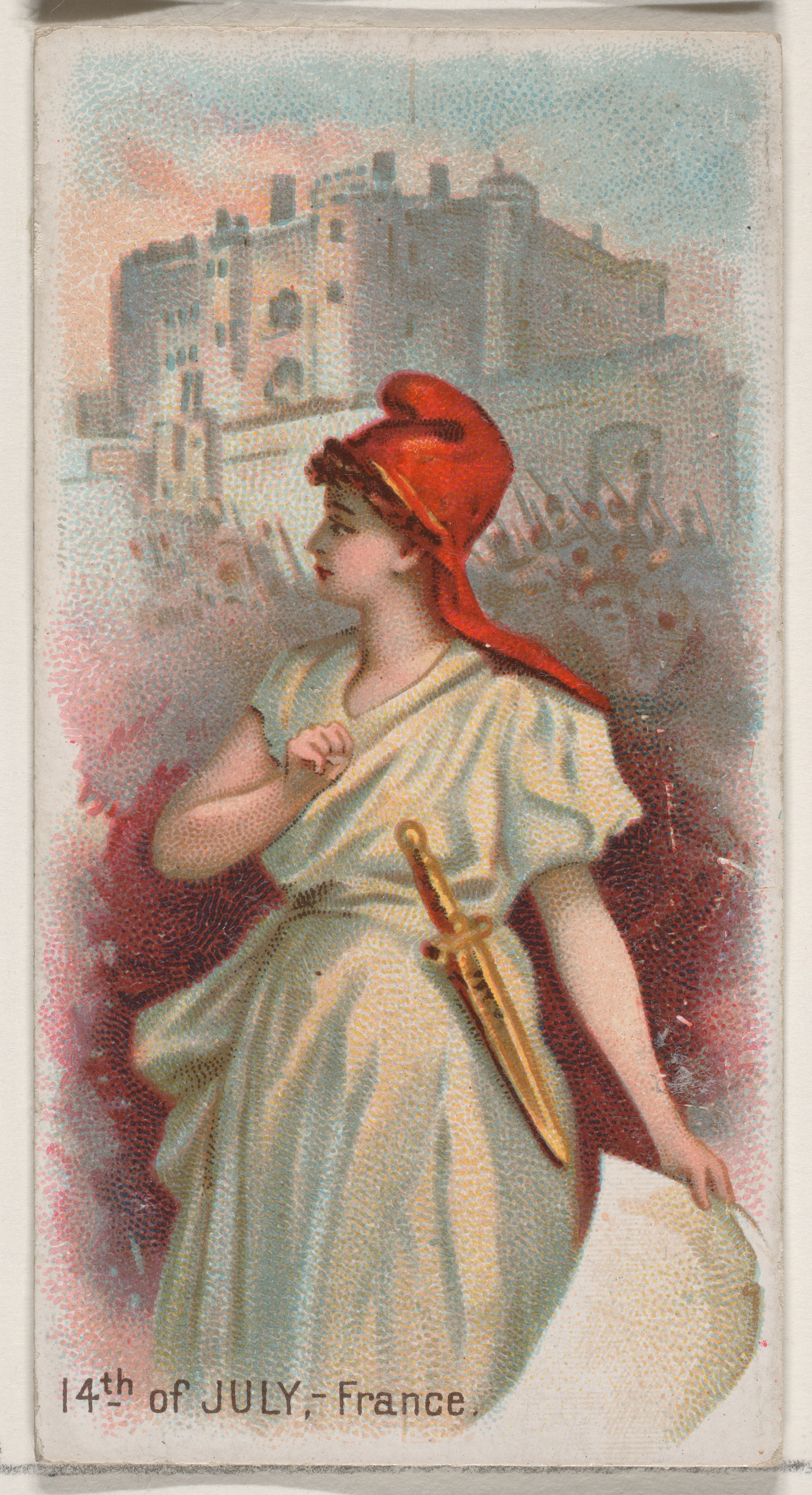
Holidays

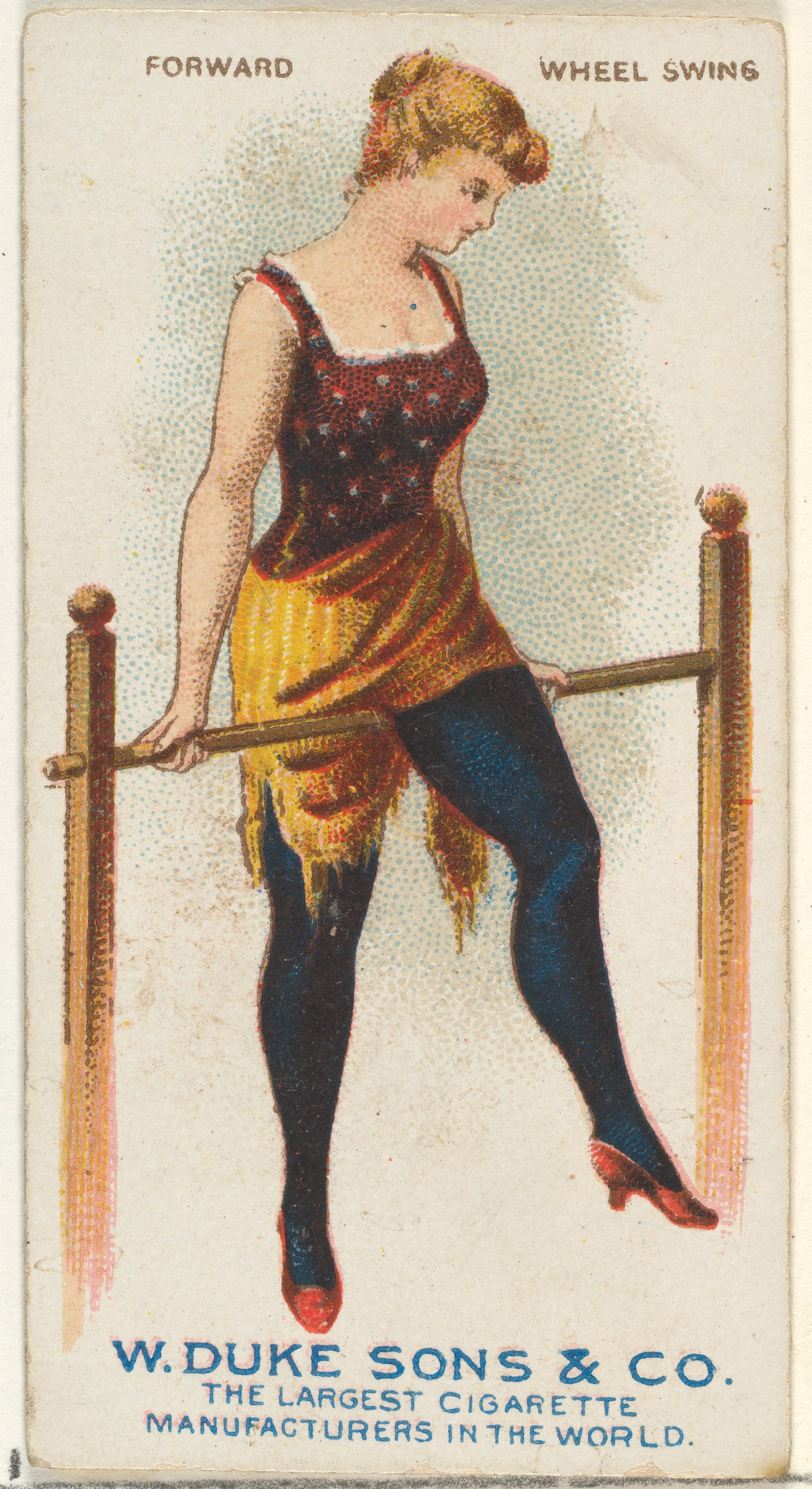
Gymnastic exercises

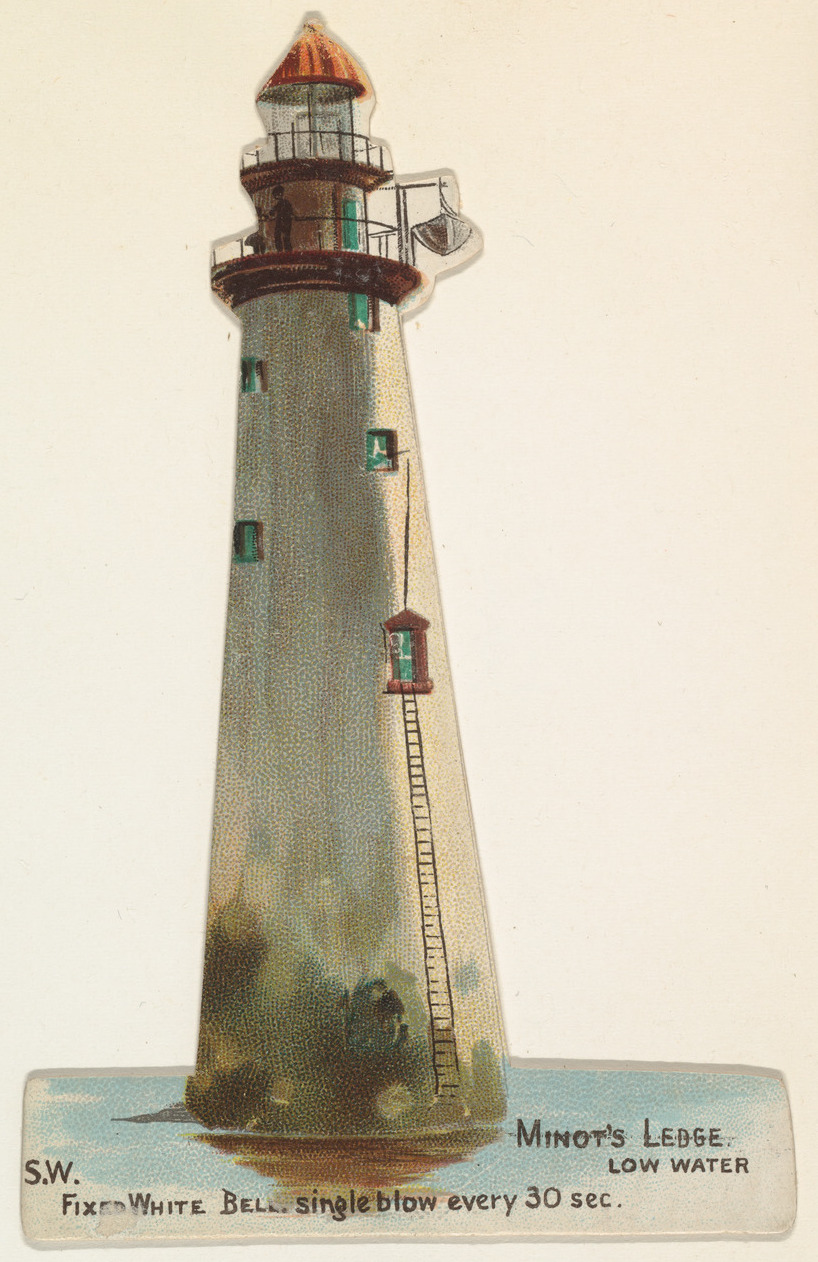
Lighthouses

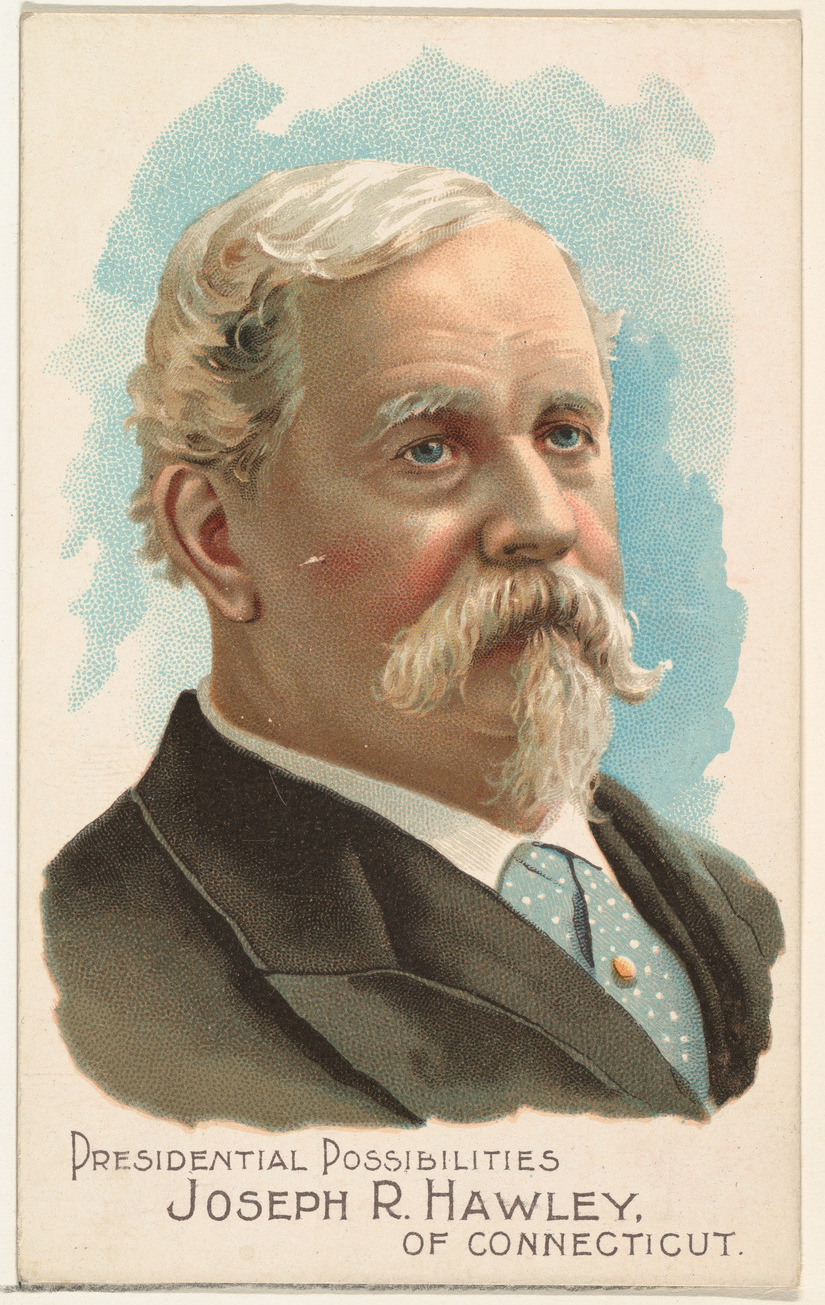
Presidential possibilities

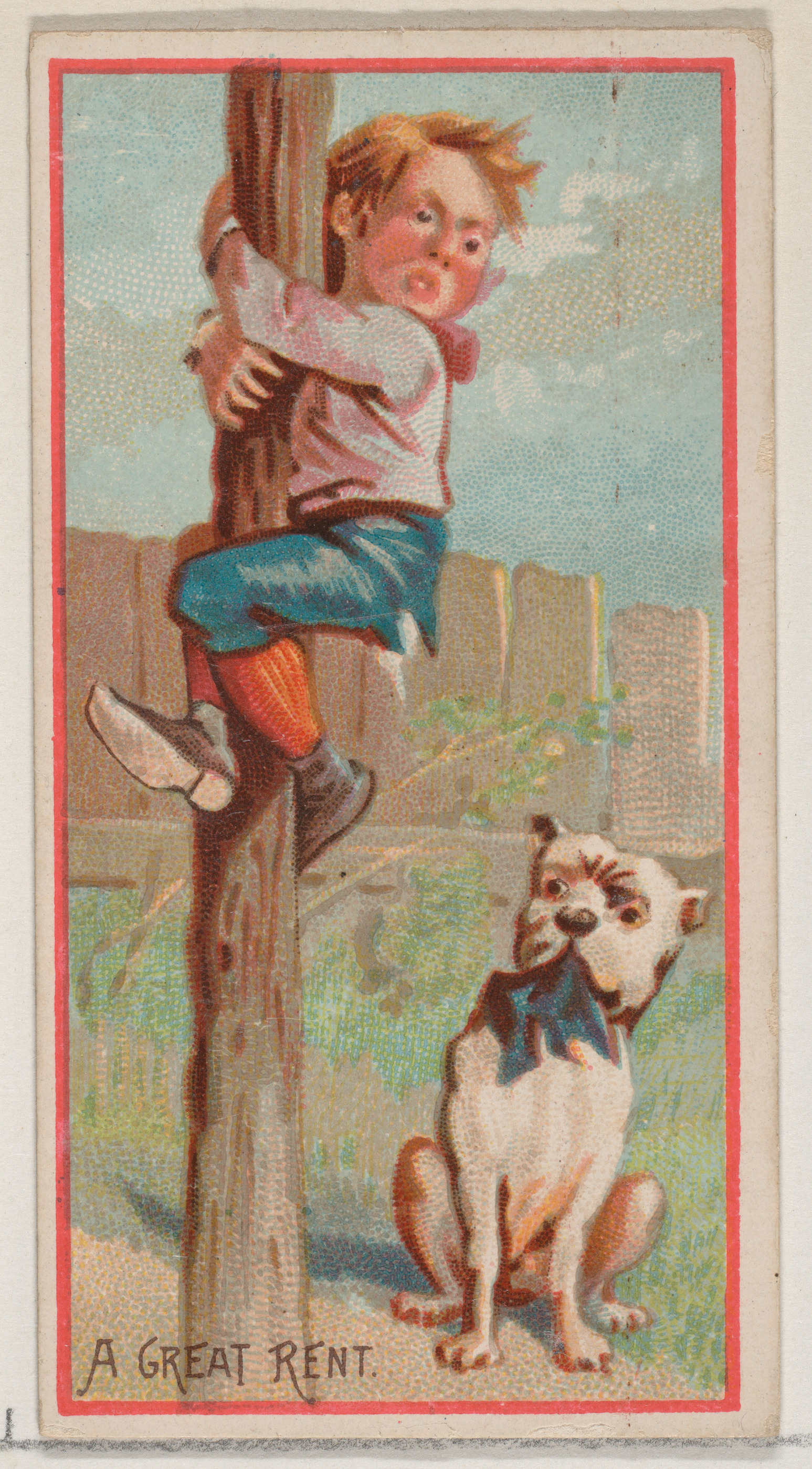
Jokes

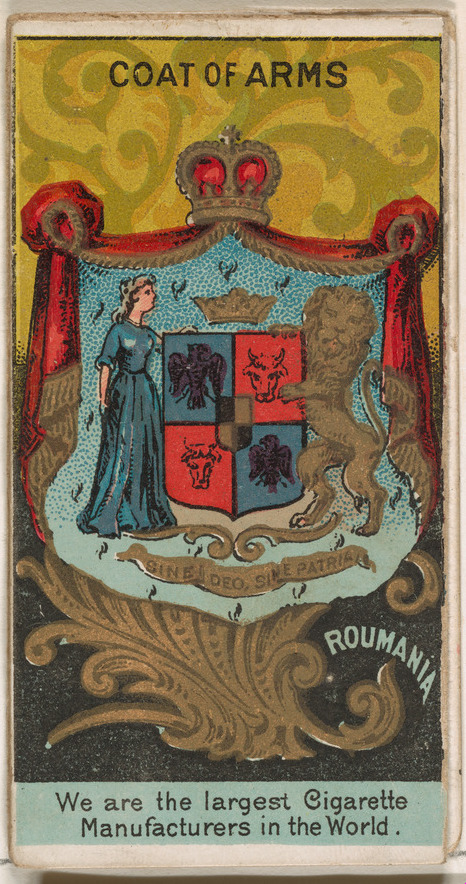
Rulers, flags, and coats of arms

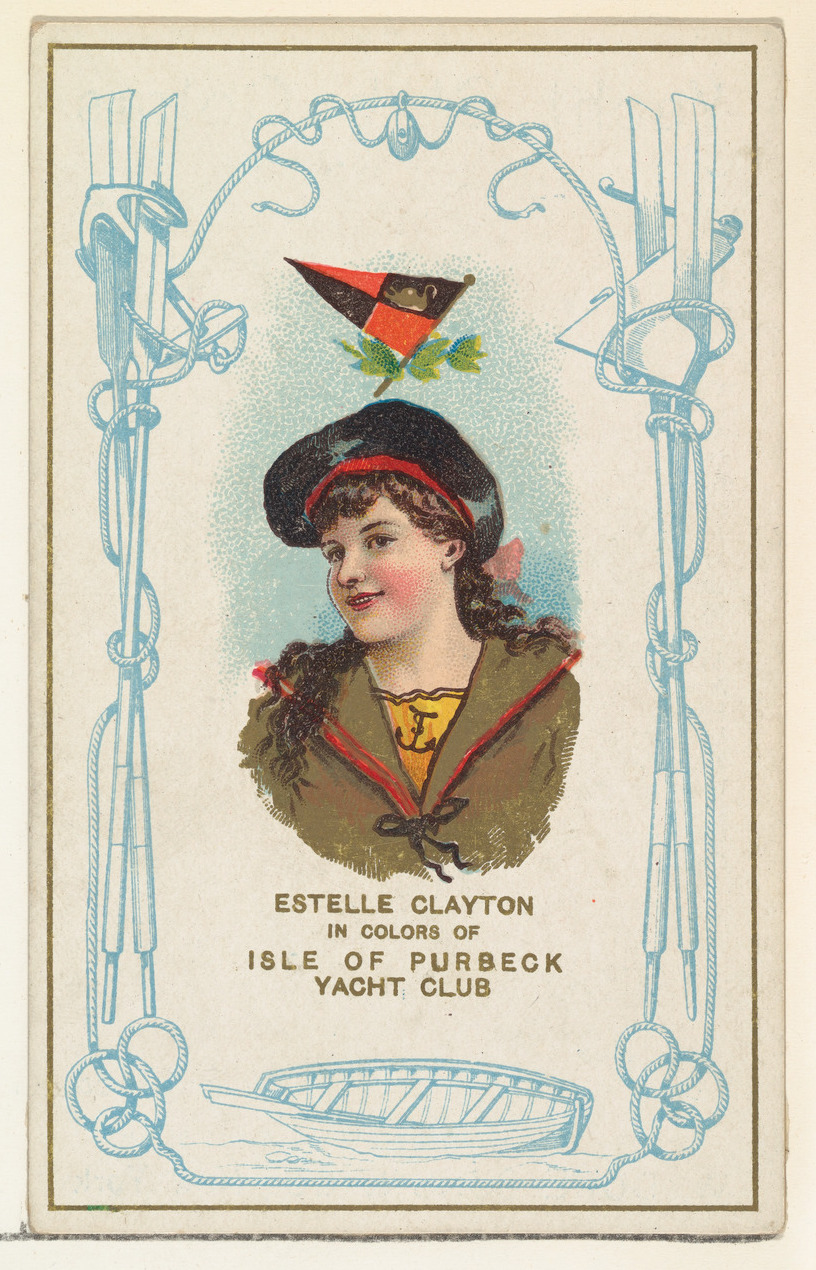
Yacht colors

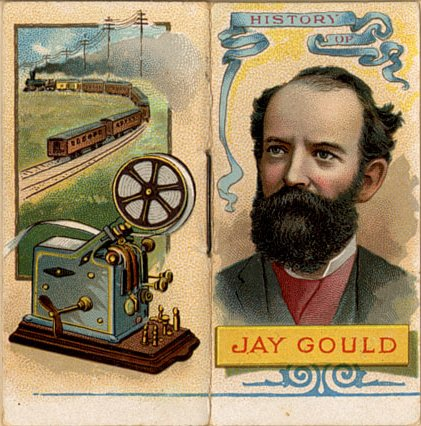
"History of Jay Gould," part of the set of 50 miniature booklets, Histories of Poor Boys Who Became Rich and Other Famous People, published by W. Duke, Sons & Co. in 1888. The booklets were the size of cigarette cards and were included with cigarette packages just as collectible cigarette cards were. Another series of 50 booklets was titled Histories of Generals.

== See also ==
- List of tobacco-related topics
