= Lucky Strike =

American cigarette brand

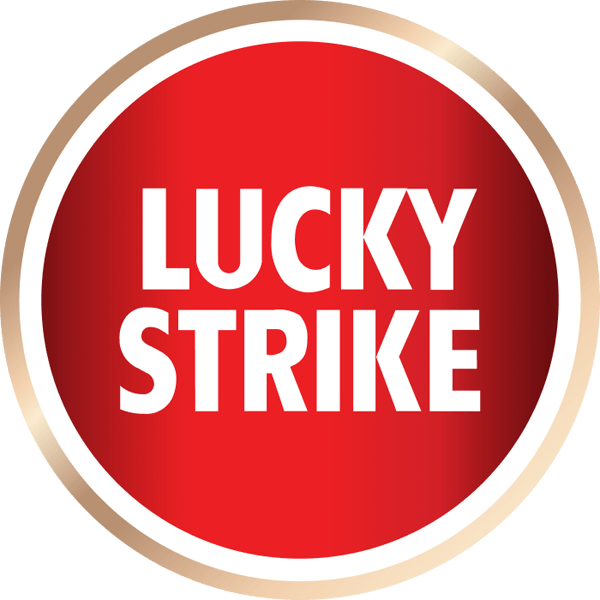
- Current owner: British American Tobacco
- Produced by: British American Tobacco; R. J. Reynolds
- Country: United States
- Introduced: 1871

Lucky Strike is an American brand of cigarettes owned by the British American Tobacco group. Individual cigarettes of the brand are often referred to colloquially as "Luckies".

== Name ==
Lucky Strike was introduced as a brand of plug tobacco (chewing tobacco bound together with molasses) by an American firm R. A. Patterson in 1871 and evolved into a cigarette by the early 1900s. The brand style name was inspired by the gold rushes of the era, and was intended to connote a top-quality blend.

An urban legend claims that the name is a reference to cannabis in some cigarette packs.

== History ==
The brand was first introduced by R. A. Patterson of Richmond, Virginia, in 1871 as cut plug chewing tobacco and later as a cigarette. In 1905, the company was acquired by the American Tobacco Company.

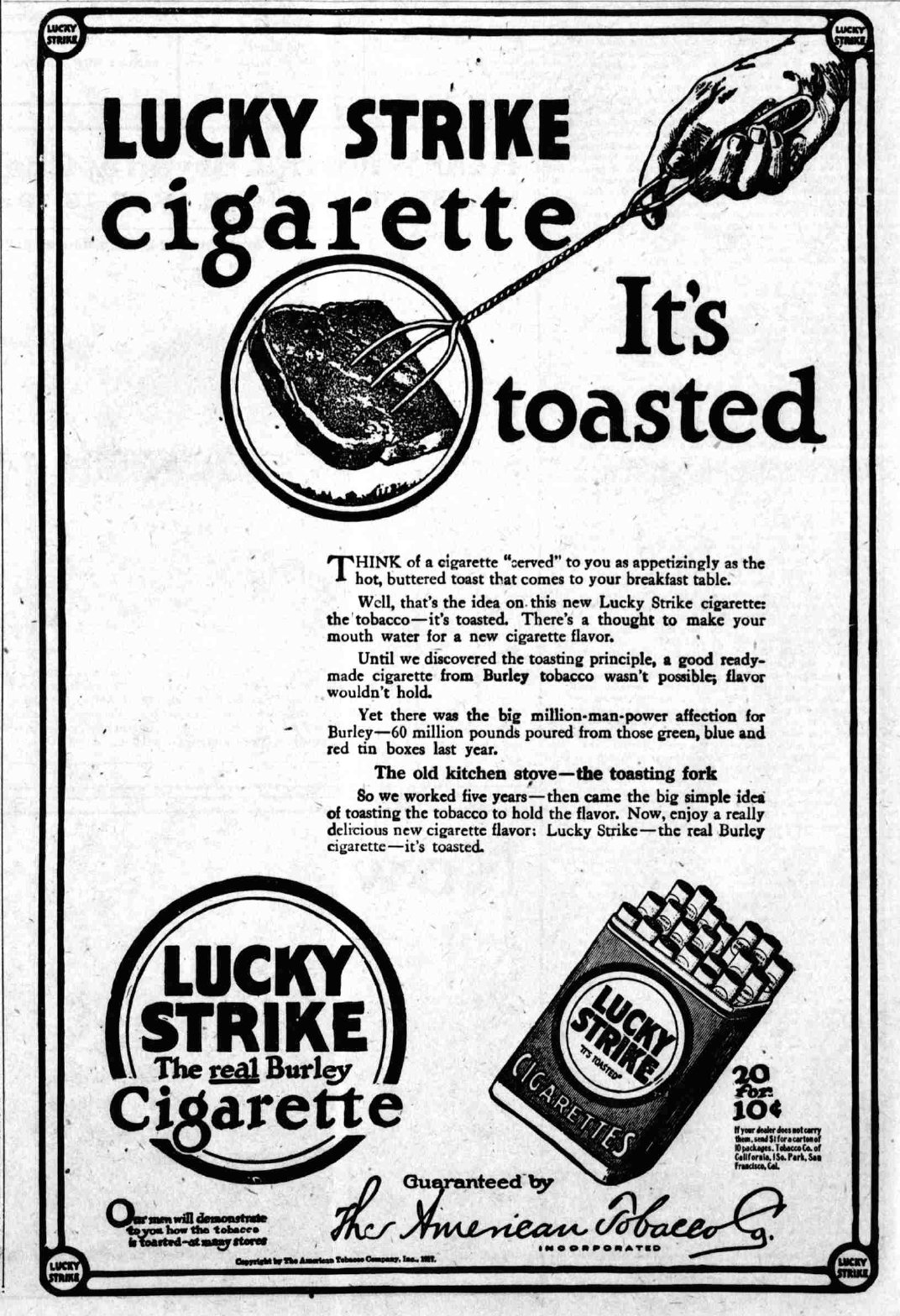
The "It's Toasted" ad as explained, from 1917

In 1917, the brand debuted the slogan "It's Toasted" to promote the manufacturing method of toasting — rather than sun drying — the tobacco. In an attempt to counter this popular campaign, competitor Camel took a different approach, claiming that Camel was a "fresh cigarette never parched or toasted".

Lucky Strike's association with radio programs began during the 1920s on NBC. By 1928, the bandleader and vaudeville producer B. A. Rolfe was performing on radio and recording as "B.A. Rolfe and his Lucky Strike Orchestra" for Edison Records. Aviatrix Amelia Earhart became the face of Lucky Strike cigarettes in 1928, claiming to have smoked Lucky Strikes on her flight from Canada to England. The copy of an advertisement at that time said, "Lucky Strikes were the cigarettes carried on the 'Friendship' when she crossed the Atlantic. They were smoked continuously from Trepassey to Wales. I think nothing else helped so much to lessen the strain for all of us."

In the late 1920s, the brand was sold as an avenue to thinness for women. One typical advertisement said, "Reach for a Lucky instead of a sweet." Sales went from 14 billion cigarettes in 1925 to 40 billion in 1930.

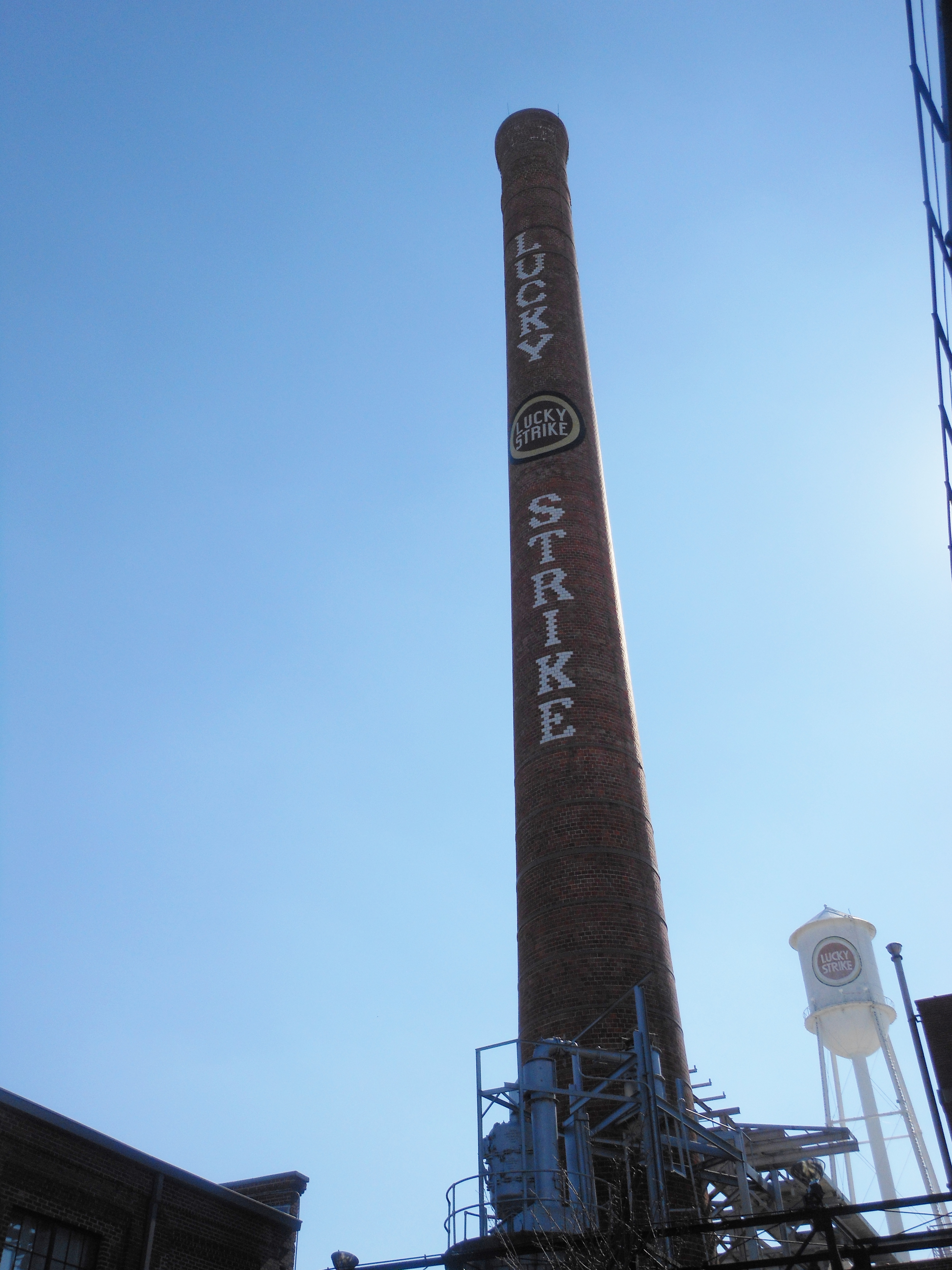
Lucky Strike factories in Durham, North Carolina, pictured in 2014

In the early 1930s, Al Jolson was also paid to endorse the brand; he called Lucky Strike "The cigarette of the acting profession ... the good old flavor of Luckies is as sweet and soothing as the best 'Mammy' song ever written." In 1935, the American Tobacco Company began to sponsor Your Hit Parade, featuring North Carolina tobacco auctioneer Lee Aubrey "Speed" Riggs (later, another tobacco auctioneer from Lexington, Kentucky, F. E. Boone, was added). The weekly radio show capitalized on the tobacco auction theme and each ended with the signature phrase "Sold, American".

In 1934, Edward Bernays was asked to deal with women's apparent reluctance to buy Lucky Strikes because their green and red package clashed with standard female fashions. When Bernays suggested changing the package to a neutral color, George Washington Hill, head of the American Tobacco Company, refused, citing the money that he had already spent millions advertising the package. Bernays then endeavored to make green a fashionable color. The centerpiece of his efforts was the Green Ball, a social event at the Waldorf Astoria, hosted by Narcissa Cox Vanderlip. The pretext for the ball and its unnamed underwriter was that all proceeds would go to charity. High society women would attend wearing green dresses. Manufacturers and clothing and accessories retailers were advised of the excitement growing around the color green. Intellectuals were enlisted to give highbrow talks on the theme of green.

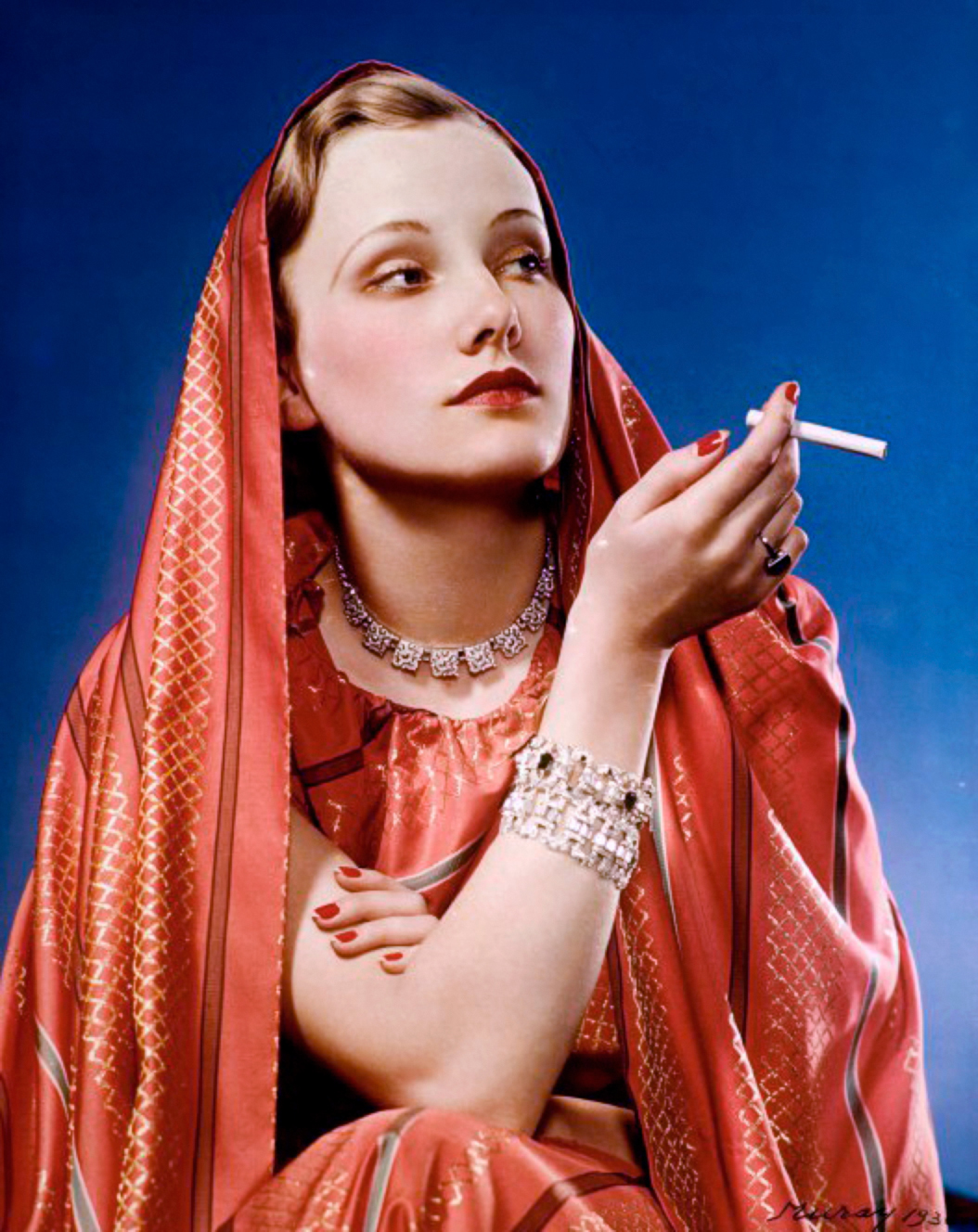
Advertising photo for Lucky Strike by Nickolas Muray, 1936

The company's advertising campaign generally featured a theme that stressed the quality of the tobacco, claiming that the higher quality tobacco resulted in a cigarette with better flavor. This campaign included a series of advertisements using Hollywood actors as endorsers of Lucky Strike. For example, Douglas Fairbanks referenced its toasted tobacco as a distinguishing feature.

In 1937–1938, American Tobacco paid $130,000 (US$3.2 million in 2019) to 16 Hollywood actors and actresses for their endorsement of Lucky Strike. The highest paid among the celebrities were Joan Crawford, Gary Cooper, Clark Gable, Myrna Loy, Robert Taylor, and Spencer Tracy, who were each paid $10,000 (roughly US$178,000 in 2019).

"Luckies" were the cigarette of choice for famous smoker Bette Davis. Starting in the fall of 1944, Lucky Strike began sponsoring comedian Jack Benny's radio and television show, The Jack Benny Program, which was also introduced as The Lucky Strike Program.

The Lucky Strike signature dark-green pack was changed to white in 1942 in a famous advertising campaign that used the slogan "Lucky Strike Green has gone to war." The company claimed the change was made because the copper used in the green coloring was needed for World War II, though, in reality, American Tobacco used chromium for the green ink and copper for the gold-colored trim. Supply of each was limited and the substitute materials made the packaging look drab, but attributing the package update to the war effort helped Lucky Strike appear more patriotic. Famed industrial designer Raymond Loewy was challenged by company president George Washington Hill to improve the existing green and red package with a $50,000 bet. Loewy changed the background from green to white, because market research suggested it had more appeal to female smokers while also cutting printing costs by eliminating the green dye. He also placed the Lucky Strike target logo on both sides of the package, a move that increased both visibility and sales. Hill paid off the bet.

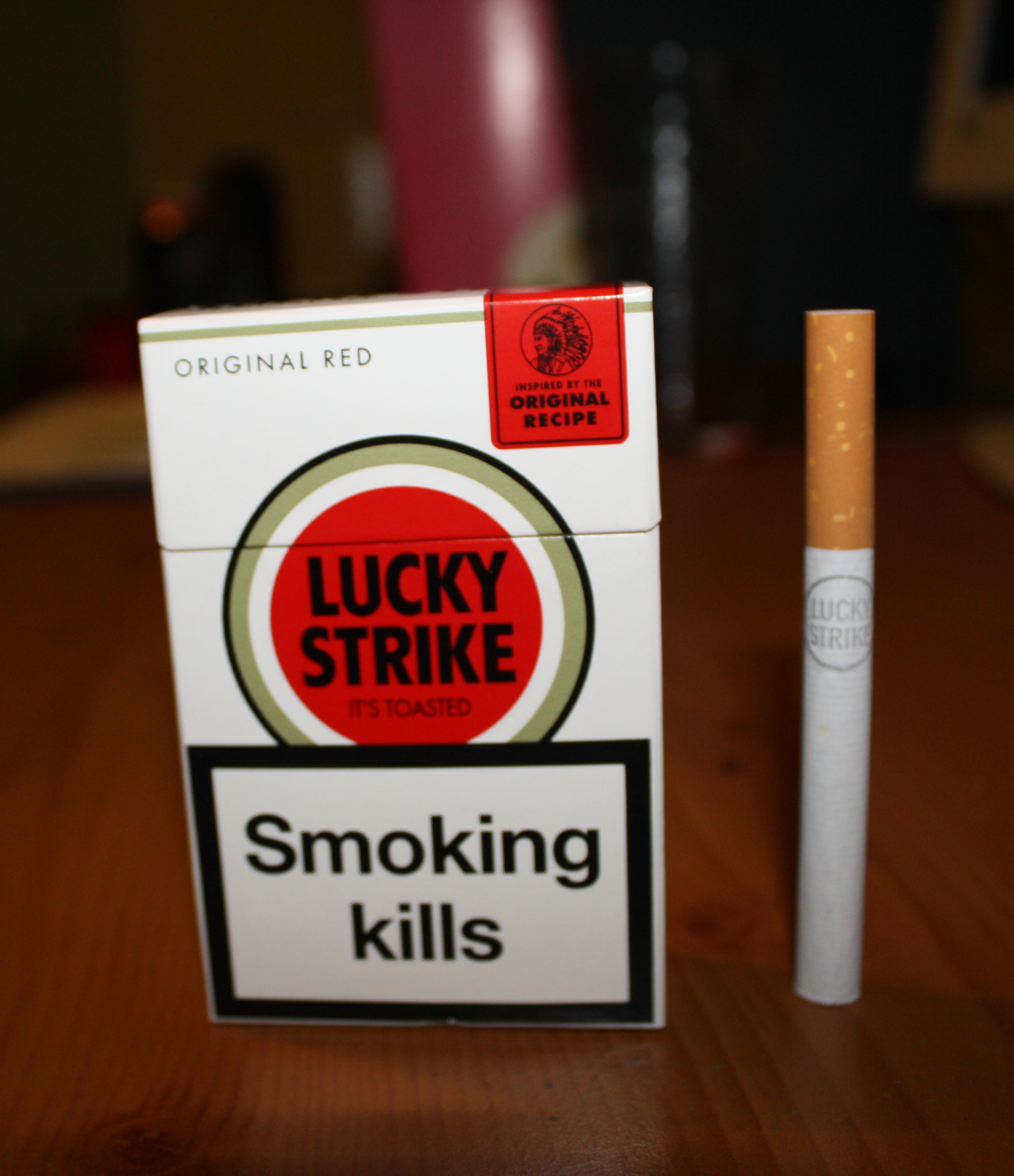
British Lucky Strike pack with government health warning, alongside a cigarette

The message "L.S./M.F.T." ("Lucky Strike means fine tobacco") was introduced on the package in 1944.

Lucky Strike was one of the brands included in the C-rations provided to American troops during World War II. Each C-ration of the time included nine cigarettes of varying brands, because military leaders believed tobacco was essential to the morale of soldiers. The other cigarette brands included in the C-rations were Camel, Chelsea, Chesterfield, Craven "A"-Brand, Old Gold, Philip Morris, Player's, Raleigh, and Wings. The practice of including cigarettes in field rations continued through the Korean and Vietnam Wars, ending in 1976 with the growing evidence that linked smoking to various health problems.

=== Post World War II ===
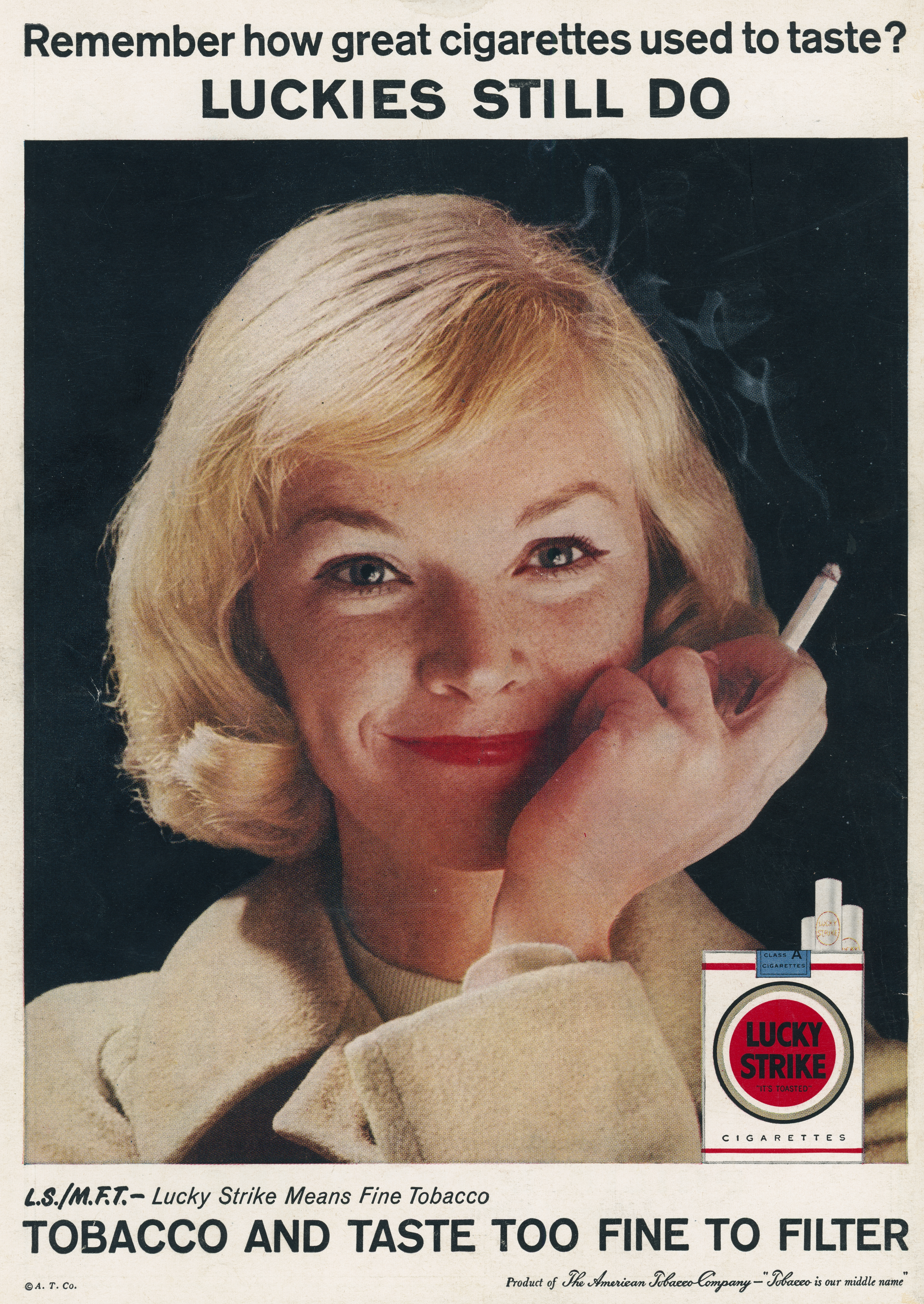
A 1960 ad

In 1978 and 1994, export and U.S. rights were purchased by Brown & Williamson. In the 1960s, filtered styles were launched in addition to a mentholated version called "Lucky Strike Green", with "green" referring to menthol and not to the package color. In late 2006, the "Full Flavored" and "Light" filtered varieties were discontinued in North America. However, Lucky Strike continued to have marketing and distribution support in territories controlled by British American Tobacco (BAT) as a global brand. Additionally, R. J. Reynolds continues to market the original, non-filtered Lucky Strikes in the United States. Lucky Strike currently has a small base of smokers.

In 2007, a new packaging of Lucky Strikes was released with a two-way opening that splits seven cigarettes from the rest. In that same year, the company used the world's smallest man at the time, He Pingping, in their advertising campaigns.

In 2009, Lucky Strike Silver (the variety marketed as "lighter") changed its UK pack from the quintessential red design to blue, albeit with a red outer covering around the packet.

In 2012 consumption of Lucky Strikes stood at 33 billion packets, up from 23 billion in 2007. The television series Mad Men, which featured Lucky Strike as a major client of the advertising firm Sterling Cooper and the cigarette of choice of Don Draper, was credited with inspiring the massive jump in sales.

In December 2020, Lucky Strike filtered cigarettes, both full-flavored and lights, plus full-flavored and light menthol versions, were reintroduced to the U.S. market.

== Sport sponsorship ==
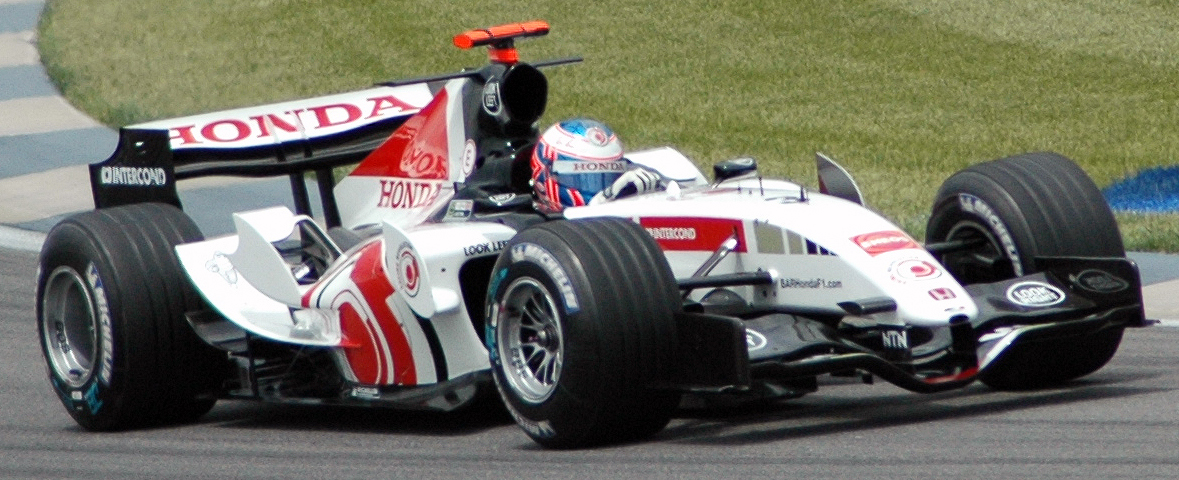
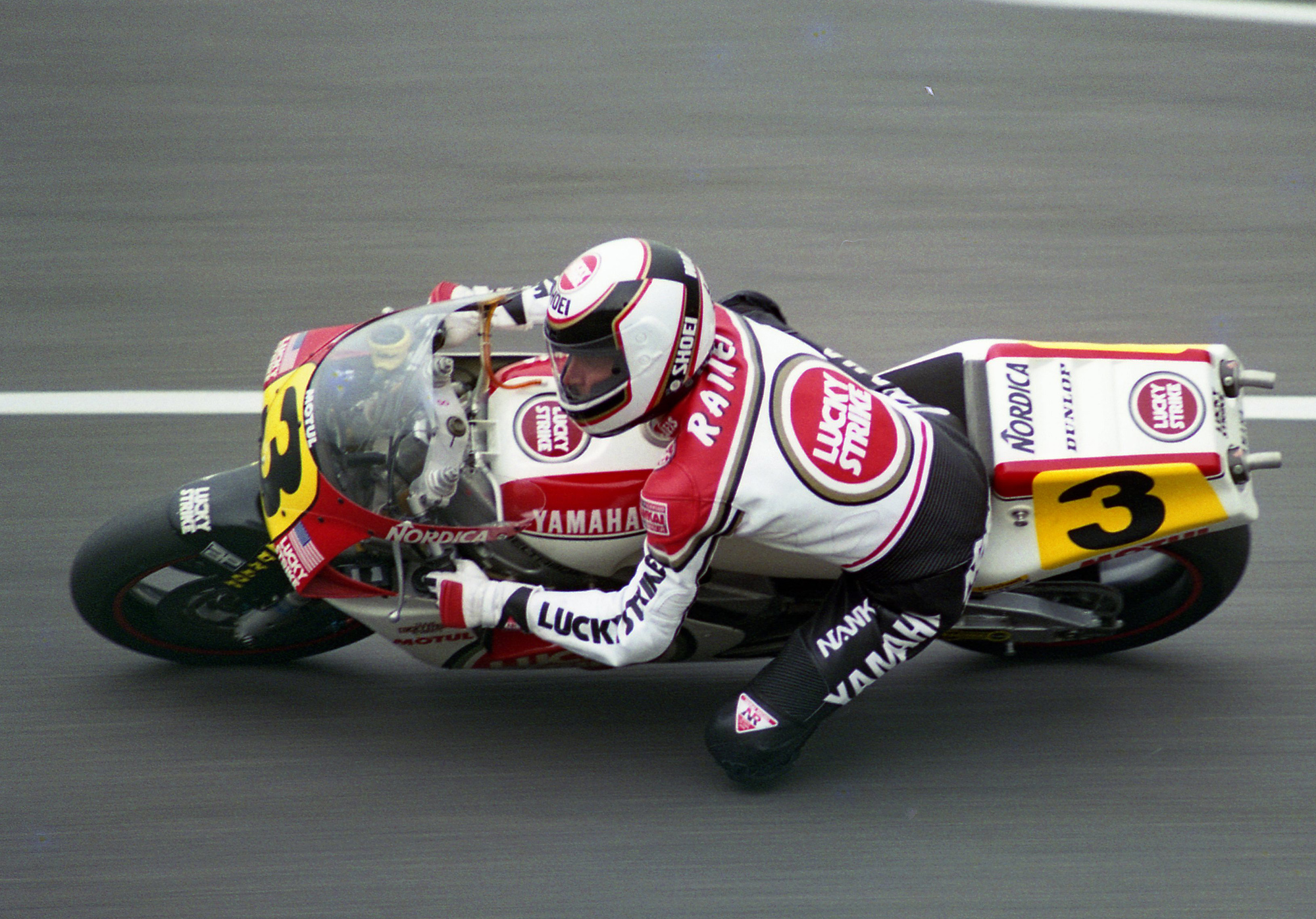
Jenson Button driving for BAR at Indianapolis in the 2005 US Grand Prix. (pictured top) and Wayne Rainey riding a Yamaha YZR500 during the 1989 Japanese motorcycle Grand Prix. In response to restrictions on tobacco advertising in F1, the livery does not explicitly mention Lucky Strike.

From 1972 until the team's departure in 1975, Lucky Strike sponsored the Scuderia Scribante team, which was also known as "Neville Lederle" and "Lucky Strike Racing". The cars, driven by Neville Lederle and Dave Charlton, were some of the first to be sponsored by a major tobacco company after the Lotus Team was sponsored by Gold Leaf in 1968, and Marlboro started sponsoring British Racing Motors in 1972 and later McLaren in 1974. The team mainly participated in the South African Grand Prix in Kyalami, but during the 1972 Formula One season, the team also participated in the French Grand Prix in Circuit de Charade, the British Grand Prix in Brands Hatch and the German Grand Prix at the old Nürburgring. After the retirement of the team, it took over 20 years before Lucky Strike participated in Formula 1 again with the British American Racing team.

As a result of British American Tobacco (BAT) buying out American Tobacco Company in 1976, Lucky Strike came under control of BAT. The company acquired Formula 1's Tyrrell Racing team in 1997 and rebranded it as British American Racing the following year, sponsoring the team with its Lucky Strike and stablemate 555 brands. In the team's début season, they originally wanted to brand Jacques Villeneuve's car in the red and white Lucky Strike livery, while branding Ricardo Zonta's car with the blue colors of 555. However, the FIA blocked the move, and the team were forced to run two similar liveries. They opted to have the Lucky Strike livery on the left hand side of the car and the 555 livery on the right hand side, with a zip going up in the middle of the nose. From 2000 on, the team solely used Lucky Strike branding. The team was bought outright by partners Honda by 2006, though Lucky Strike continued to sponsor the team until the end of that year. For races where tobacco branding was not allowed, the Lucky Strike logo was blocked out (from 1999 to 2004), replaced by "Run Free" on other parts of the car (in 1999), changed to "Look Alike" (from 2000 to 2003), to a barcode with Formula One car (in 2002–2005), to "Look Left", "Look Right", and "Don't Walk" (in 2004–2006), and "Racing Revolution" (in 2005–2006) At the 2006 Brazilian Grand Prix, they used the slogans "Racing Forever" and "Last Blast" on the colors as a tribute to main sponsor British American Tobacco in honor of the last race.

Lucky Strike was also the prime sponsor of the Suzuki MotoGP team from the 1990 season until the 1997 season. American motorcycle racer Kevin Schwantz became the 1993 world champion riding the Lucky Strike-sponsored Suzuki RGV500, with riders including Doug Chandler, Alex Barros and Daryl Beattie taking various podiums and wins on the Lucky Strike Suzuki as well.

== In popular culture ==
=== In art ===
- American Colonial-Cubist artist Stuart Davis represented the brand in his 1921 painting, Lucky Strike

=== In music ===
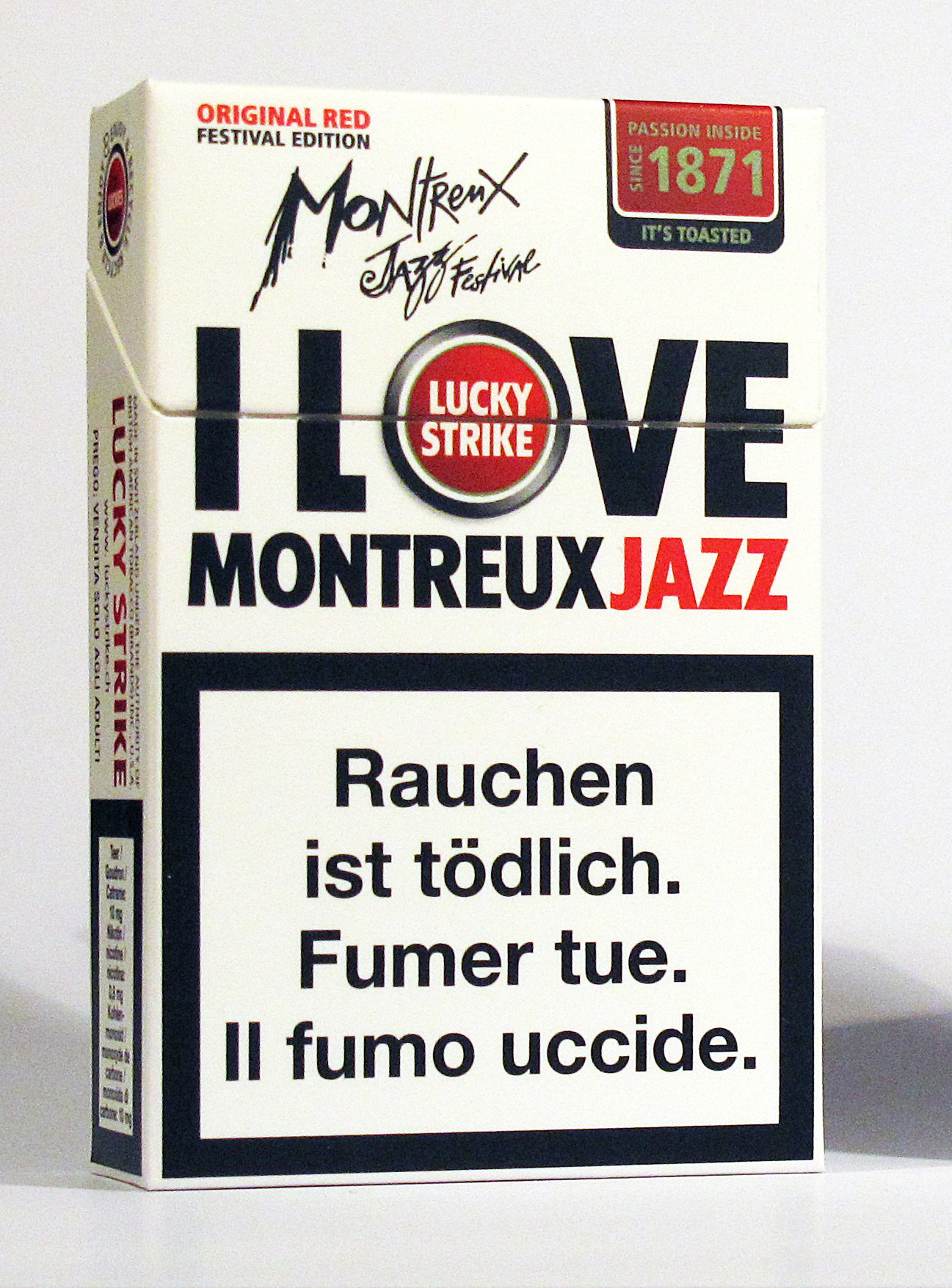
Sponsoring of festival de jazz de Montreux by British American Tobacco in 2012

- The song "Give it Back to the Indians" composed by Rodgers and Hart from the 1939 musical Too Many Girls, contains a reference to Lucky Strikes
- The song "So Round, So Firm, So Fully Packed", written by Merle Travis, Eddie Kirk, and Cliffie Stone in 1947, is named for a Lucky Strike advertising slogan
- The song “Hero In Your Own Hometown” by Mary Chapin Carpenter references “Luckies”
- The song "I'm Bad, I'm Nationwide" performed by ZZ Top from their 1979 album Degüello, contains a reference to Lucky Strikes
- The cover art for the 1964 album Lucky Strikes by the saxophonist Lucky Thompson was modelled after the cigarette brand's logo and design.
- The song "Keeping the Faith", performed by Billy Joel from his 1983 album An Innocent Man, contains a reference to Lucky Strikes
- The song "Chain Smokin'" performed by Morgan Wallen contains a reference to Lucky Strikes
- The song “These are My People” performed by Rodney Atkins references smoking Lucky Strikes
- Minneapolis indie rock band Howler based the artwork of their debut album America Give Up on a pack of Lucky Strikes
- A song named after the cigarettes appears on the Maroon 5 album, Overexposed
- A song named after the cigarettes appears on the Troye Sivan album, Bloom
- The song "Then Came the Night" performed by Tommy Shane Steiner, a cover of the same song by Trace Adkins, mentions a Lucky Strike cigarette
- The song "Back in this Cigarette" by Jason Aldean references an ashtray full of Lucky Strikes
- Paul Silhan recorded a parody of Lou Christie's hit song "Lightnin' Strikes" - titled "Lightin' Up Lucky Strikes Again" - for his 1997 album Spinball Wizard. It was frequently played around that time on The Rush Limbaugh Show
- The song "Everything Must Go" performed by Steely Dan from their eponymous 2003 album contains a reference to Lucky Strikes
- The song "Two pump Texaco" by Diamond Rio in their 1998 album Unbelievable contains a reference to Lucky Strikes
- The song "Big Day" by Lodger in their 2005 album Hi-Fi High Lights Down Low contains a reference to Lucky Strikes

=== In film ===
- In the 1946 Warner Bros. cartoon, Book Revue, Daffy Duck used the Lucky Strike slogan, "So round, so firm, so fully packed, so light and easy on the draw" in its entirety
- In Breathless, a young girl (played by Liliane Dreyfus) standing in front of a wall decoration made of empty boxes of Gauloises lights a cigarette and claims that she switched to Luckies
- In the Eddie Murphy film Beverly Hills Cop (1984), his character Axel Foley is introduced as a jive-talking hustler involved in the clandestine sale of an illegally procured semi truck full of Lucky Strike cigarettes
- In the 1990 film Misery, famed novelist Paul Sheldon, played by James Caan, has a habit of smoking a single Lucky Strike cigarette and drinking a glass of Dom Pérignon every time he's about to finish the manuscript for a new novel
- In the opening song to the 2001 film Cowboy Bebop: The Movie, a pack of original red Lucky Strikes appears on a table
- In the 1999 film The Thirteenth Floor, a Lucky Strikes billboard can be seen on a highway
- In the 1999 film The Ninth Gate, Johnny Depp's character Dean Corso smokes Lucky Strikes cigarettes
- In the 1994 movie The Shawshank Redemption, Lucky Strike cigarettes are frequently exchanged between prisoners
- In the 1990 movie Goodfellas, Henry and Tommy are seen selling cartons of cigarettes on the street and boxes with Lucky Strike logos can be seen inside of a truck
- In the 1987 movie The Untouchables, Eliot Ness (played by Kevin Costner) smokes Lucky Strike cigarettes
- In the 1982 film The Year of Living Dangerously, correspondent Guy Hamilton (played by Mel Gibson) smokes Lucky Strike cigarettes, which the Indonesian locals seem to regard as being superior to their domestic brands
- In the 2023 film Killers of the Flower Moon, the radio play at the end is sponsored by Lucky Strike
- An American 2026 war film uses the Lucky Strike for its title and as a minor plot device

=== In television ===
- In the AMC television series Mad Men, Lucky Strike is a major client for the fictional advertising agency Sterling Cooper. Anachronistically, in the series' pilot episode, "Smoke Gets in Your Eyes", a subplot deals the birth of the slogan “It’s Toasted,” which was actually introduced more than 40 years before the date of the show. The main character, Don Draper, is often seen smoking Lucky Strikes.
- In the NBC television series Miami Vice, Lucky Strike is the preferred cigarette brand of the main character, Detective James "Sonny" Crockett. He is even seen removing the filter of a different brand of cigarette in a particular episode to make it smoke more like a Lucky Strike.
- In "Bastogne", the sixth episode of the HBO television series Band of Brothers, Sergeant Donald Malarkey shares cigarettes with Sergeant Warren "Skip" Muck and Private First Class Alex Penkala in a foxhole during a Christmas break from fighting. He recites the advertising slogan, "Lucky Strikes means fine tobacco," as he distributes them. Lucky Strike cigarettes are also featured prominently throughout the series.
- In the HBO miniseries The Pacific, Lucky Strike cigarettes are prominently featured throughout the program, with Robert Leckie claiming in the second episode that "[o]nly the officers get the Lucky Strikes," while the enlisted men have to make do with Raleighs.

=== In literature ===
- The poem "At the Fishhouses", by Elizabeth Bishop, from her 1956 collection A Cold Spring, contains a reference to Lucky Strikes: "The old man accepts a Lucky Strike./He was a friend of my grandfather."
- In the 1972 novel Roadside Picnic by Arkady and Boris Strugatsky, the protagonist Redrick Schuhart mentions buying a pack of Lucky Strike cigarettes
- In the novel The Secret History by Donna Tartt, the narrator is being offered Lucky Strike cigarettes by another character: "When he'd finished he took his cigarettes out of his shirt pocket (he smoked Lucky Strikes; whenever I think of him I think of that little bull's-eye right over his heart) and offered me one, shaking a couple out of the pack and raising an eyebrow."

=== In video games ===
- In the Metal Gear video game series, Lucky Strike is Solid Snake's favorite brand of cigarettes
- Lucky Strike cigarettes are featured in the game Escape From Tarkov

=== Manga ===
- In the manga Last Inning by Ryu Kamio, the protagonist, Keisuke Hatogaya, consumes Lucky Strike cigarettes, the first direct reference being Chapter 4 of the first volume
- Luchist Lasso in the manga Shaman King by Hiroyuki Takei is named after Lucky Strikes.

== Controversies ==
=== Lawsuits ===
In 1996, Brown & Williamson, the makers of Lucky Strike, were ordered to pay $750,000 to a Florida resident who had developed lung cancer after having smoked cigarettes for 44 years. The jury found Brown & Williamson guilty of manufacturing a defective product and of engaging in misleading advertising by not warning people about the health danger associated with their product.

In 1998, Brown & Williamson again found liable to pay $950,000 in damages to the relatives of a Florida resident who had died from lung cancer. The jury found that the company had conspired with other tobacco companies to hide the health risks of smoking cigarettes. According to the Tampa Bay Times, this lawsuit marked "the first time a tobacco company has been ordered to pay punitive damages intended to punish and deter wrongdoing because cigarettes are inherently dangerous".

== Cigarette camp ==
"Lucky Strike" was the name of one of a number of temporary U.S. Army tent cities known as Cigarette Camps situated around the French port of Le Havre following its capture in the wake of the Allied Normandy landings in mid-1944.

== See also ==
- Tobacco smoking
- Health effects of tobacco
