= Goodwin & Company =

American tobacco company

- Formerly: E. Goodwin and Brother
- Industry: Tobacco
- Founded: c. 1860
- Founder: Charles Goodwin
- Defunct: 1890; 136 years ago
- Fate: Merged with other companies to form American Tobacco
- Headquarters: New York, U.S.
- Products: Cigarettes, trading cards
- Brands: Gypsy Queen; Old Judge

Goodwin & Company was an American tobacco manufacturer from New York City. Initially "E. Goodwin and Brother", the company was founded before the American Civil War. It was known for its cigarette brands "Gypsy Queen" and "Old Judge". In 1890, the company was merged, along with four others, into James Buchanan Duke's American Tobacco Company to create an American monopoly on tobacco product manufacturing and retail.

== Overview ==
Charles Goodwin Emery (died 1915), who had the principal interest in Goodwin & Company, became Treasurer of the American Tobacco Company. Emery built a showplace "castle" known as Calumet Castle at the Thousand Islands (Clayton, New York) and was principal investor in the grand New Hotel Frontenac nearby.

The company's tobacco trading cards, depicting baseball players, other athletes, and a variety of social scenes and portraits are collectibles. In 1887, Goodwin & Co. were among the first to issue trading cards to promote their brands, first using sepia-toned photographic albumen prints, and later chromolithographic reproductions of multi-colored etchings.

In 2011, Upper Deck Company reactivated the Goodwin Champions line, primarily to compete with Topps' revival of the Allen & Ginter brand. Similar to the original Goodwin Champions set, the revived line primarily features athletes from various American sports.

== Card sets ==
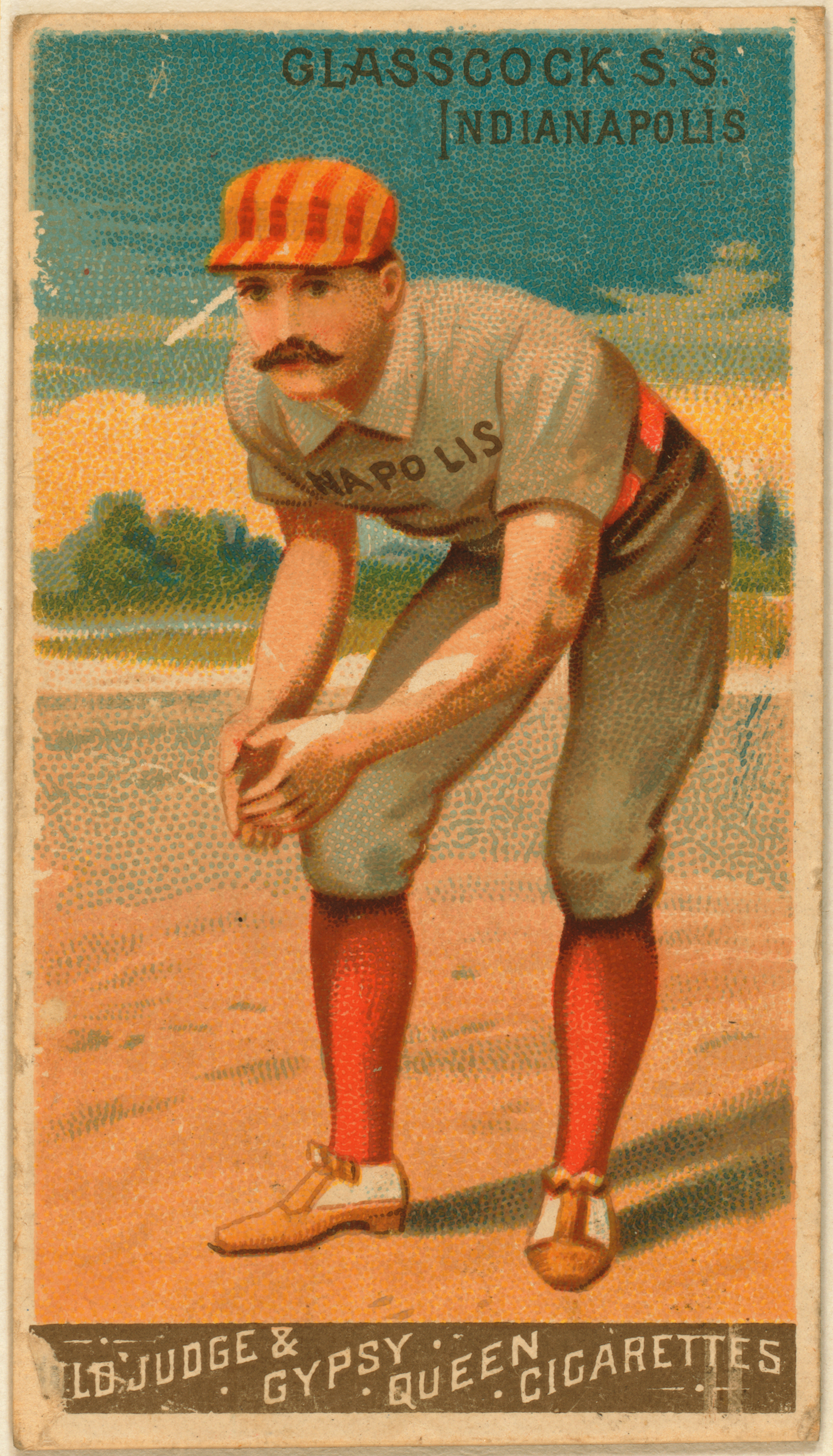
"Goodwin's Champions" tobacco card of Jack Glasscock, 1888

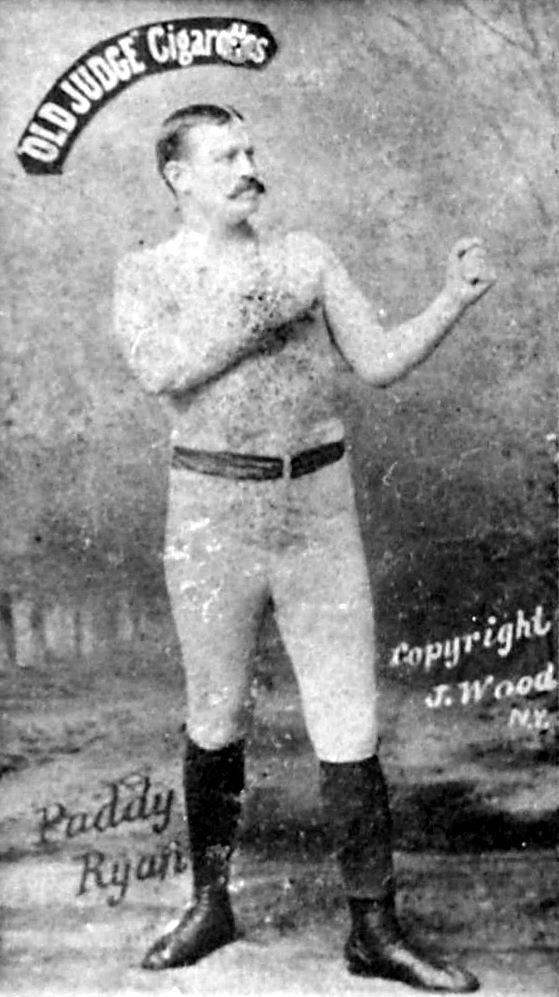
Boxer Paddy Ryan from the Old Judge cigarettes, 1887

- Old Judge, 1887–90 (N172), the first major set of baseball cards, comprising over 2,000 images and using albumen photoprints.
- Gypsy Queen, 1887 (N175), using the same images as the "Old Judge" cards, but advertising Goodwin's other brand
- Goodwin Champions, 1888 (N162), a set of 50 athletes in various disciplines, the first Goodwin set to use colored chromolithography.
- Old Judge Cabinets, 1888–89 (N173), a large-formatted set of albumen print photographs that could be retrieved in exchange for mailed-in coupons.

== Bibliography ==
- Stephen Wong, Susan Einstein: "Smithsonian Baseball: Inside the World's Finest Private Collections"; HarperCollins, 2005 (ISBN 0060838515).
- Baseball cards at the Library of Congress
- "Charles Goodwin Emery", article in Paul Malo's Fools' Paradise.
