= The Winning Season (2004 film) =

- Written by: Dan Gutman
- Directed by: John Kent Harrison
- Starring: Matthew Modine; Kristin Davis
- Country of origin: United States
- Original language: English

Production
- Producer: Lesley Oswald

Original release
- Network: TNT
- Release: April 4, 2004

The Winning Season is a 2004 television film with elements of a fantasy drama. It chronicles a young boy's dream in 1985 with playing with the Pittsburgh Pirates' great Honus Wagner. It is adapted from the 1997 children's novel Honus & Me by Dan Gutman. The film premiered on TNT on April 4, 2004.

== Plot ==
A young boy dreams of playing with the Pittsburgh Pirates, and Honus Wagner. Eventually the boy assists Wagner in his 1909 World Series duel with fellow hall-of-famer Ty Cobb.

== Cast ==
- Matthew Modine - as Honus Wagner
- Kristin Davis - as Mandy
- Mark Rendall - as Joe Stoshack
- William Lee Scott - as Ty Cobb

== Production ==
The film was made by TNT and first broadcast on April 4, 2004. Modine prepared for his role as Wagner by playing with a minor-league team, the IronBirds in Aberdeen, Maryland, owned by Cal Ripken Jr.

== Critical reaction ==
Variety condemned the film as "schlocky" and sentimental. Their critic found Modine's performance started to wear and Davis brought "little conviction", but director John Kent Harrison was praised for the performance he got out of Rendall.

== See also ==
- List of baseball films
