= Baseball Card Adventures =

Novel series by Dan Gutman

- Paperback edition
- Author: Dan Gutman
- Country: United States
- Language: English
- Publisher: HarperCollins
- Published: 1997-2015
- No. of books: 12

The Baseball Card Adventures is a novel series written by Dan Gutman. There are 12 books in the series, published by HarperCollins between 1997 and 2015. The books feature a boy, Joe Stoshack, who can travel through time when he touches old baseball cards. When he holds a baseball card, he feels a tingling sensation, and when it gets strong, is transported to the year that card was made and somewhere near the ballplayer on the card. Later he discovers that this power also works on very old photographs. He tries to use this power wisely, and he attempts to change history several times, but the result is always something different from his original goal.

The novels are typically illustrated with black and white photos from the time period in which the story takes place. For example, when Jackie Robinson steals second base in Jackie & Me, a real photograph of Jackie Robinson stealing a base is pictured. Occasionally the books will also be illustrated with pictures taken exclusively for the book.

The Cambridge Companion to Baseball in its review of baseball fiction calls the books "an eclectic enterprise" which "uninhibitedly embraces the genre's cliches." Library Journal called them "good examples" of traditional sports novels.

== The books ==
=== Honus & Me ===
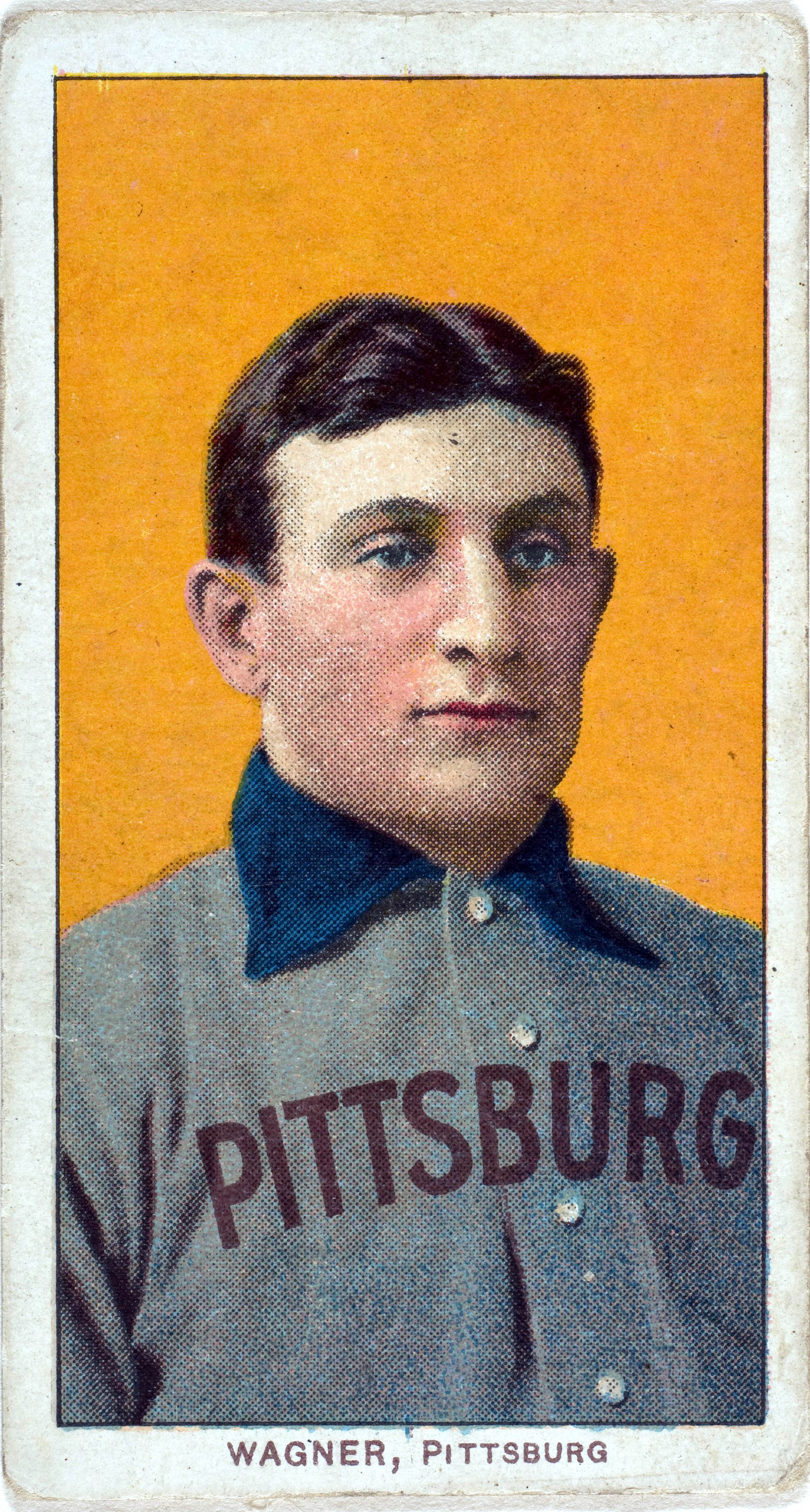
The Honus Wagner card Joe Stoshack uses to travel back to 1909 in Honus & Me

Joe Stoshack discovers the T206 Honus Wagner, the most valuable baseball card in the world, while cleaning out an Ms. Amanda Young's attic. She is over 100 years old. Stoshack brings the card to a former bad guy wrestler, Birdie Farell. He tries to trick Joe into giving it to him for $10. Joe refuses. He uses it to travel back in time to 1909. Once Joe is in 1909, he discovers that he became a grown man. Joe helps Honus Wagner win the 7th game of the 1909 World Series, and travels back to the present to return the card to his neighbor. In 1909 he discovered Ms. Young is really Wagner's old girlfriend, and sends her back in time to be with him again.

=== Jackie & Me ===
Joe Stoshack was a ten year old boy who was assigned to do a book report on Jackie Robinson for black history month. Joe goes to Flip Valentini and borrows a 1947 Jackie Robinson card.

Joe went back in time on the exact day Jackie Robinson broke the color barrier between the black league and the white league. Joe experiences what it is like to be an African American in a segregated society when he travels back to 1947 to watch Jackie Robinson play, and while going back in time he accidentally turns himself black. He tries to bring back a bunch of Jackie Robinson cards, but the cards are stolen by the Dodgers' batboy, Anthony. Joe wants to go after him, but Jackie tells him it's not safe. In the story, Joe also meets Jackie's wife and son, Jackie Jr. Joe also meets Flip Valentini as a kid and gives him advice.

School Library Journal called it "readable and accurate".

=== Babe & Me ===
Witnesses never agreed whether Babe Ruth called his shot. Like other baseball fans, Joe Stoshack wants to know the truth. Joe Stoshack and his father Bill travel back to the year 1932 and catch Babe Ruth's called shot in Game 3 of the 1932 World Series against the Chicago Cubs.

=== Shoeless Joe & Me ===
After Flip tells Stosh about the Black Sox Scandal, Stosh thinks that Shoeless Joe is innocent, and he goes back in time to try to stop it from ever happening. When he gets to 1919, three gamblers lock him in a closet because he knew about the scandal. Shoeless Joe's wife, Katie sets Stosh free and he tells Katie and Joe about the scandal. He fails to stop it but he saves his great-great uncle from dying from Influenza.

=== Mickey & Me ===
Joe's dad gets in a car crash, and fearing he might die, tells Joe his inheritance: a Mickey Mantle rookie baseball card. He tells Joe to go back and prevent the terrible accident that negatively impacted Mantle's baseball career, so Joe travels back to 1951. However, Joe's cousin Samantha switches the Mantle card for a catcher of a women's league team, Dorothy Maguire. When he goes back in time he took the job for the mascot of the Milwaukee Chicks.

=== Abner & Me ===
Joe goes back in time to see if Abner Doubleday really invented baseball. This is the first and only story in the series where Stosh's mom travels through time. The two land in a war, and help fight with a group of kids. Stosh's mom helps save an injured person's life by using modern day medical techniques. The doctor is quite impressed. Soon Joe finds Abner, and gets the answer for his question in a very interesting way.

=== Satch & Me ===
Stosh and Flip Valentini go back in time with a radar gun to find out how fast Satchel Paige's pitching really was. Unfortunately, they never get to find out, attempting to do so several times only to have something go wrong in the last minute. Then Joe Stoshack leaves Flip Valentini in the past in a climactic chase scene, and Flip lives his life over again.

=== Jim & Me ===
Joe and his enemy Bobby Fuller go back to 1913, where they meet Jim Thorpe, Bobby Fuller's great-grandfather. However, along the way they have several disagreements and fights.

=== Ray & Me ===
After Joe is hit in the head by a baseball and wakes up after two weeks in a coma, he learns about another baseball player who wasn't so lucky – Ray Chapman. When Joe recovers from his accident, he goes back to 1920 and attempts to save Chapman from being fatally struck in the head with a baseball.

=== Roberto & Me ===
Joe meets player and humanitarian Roberto Clemente, before traveling forward to 2080 to see the damage caused by global warming and he saves his Spanish teacher along the way.

=== Ted & Me ===
An FBI agent, who found out about Joe's power, comes and sends Joe back in time with a Ted Williams card to warn President Franklin D. Roosevelt about the attack on Pearl Harbor.

=== Willie & Me ===
On the advice of Ralph Branca, Joe travels back to 1951 to try to prevent the "Shot Heard 'Round the World", one of the most controversial home runs in baseball history. However, he soon realizes that by doing so, he may forever alter the life of a young rookie named Willie Mays and not in a good way.

== Titles in the series ==
Title	Historical figure	Year publ.
Honus & Me	Honus Wagner	1997
Jackie & Me	Jackie Robinson	1999
Babe & Me	Babe Ruth	2000
Shoeless Joe & Me	Shoeless Joe Jackson	2002
Mickey & Me	Mickey Mantle and Dorothy Maguire	2003
Abner & Me	Abner Doubleday	2005
Satch & Me	Satchel Paige	2006
Jim & Me	Jim Thorpe	2008
Ray & Me	Ray Chapman	2009
Roberto & Me	Roberto Clemente	2010
Ted & Me	Ted Williams	2012
Willie & Me	Willie Mays	2015

== Bibliography ==
- Anderson, Andrew. "In the Tradition of Chip, Horatio, and the Hardy Boys: Lessons for Life in Old Baseball Cards – Dan Gutman's ... & Me Novels", in Carino (2006), 16-25.
