= Vittor =

Vittor is a surname. Notable people with the surname include:

- Frank Vittor (1888–1968), American sculptor
- Sergio Vittor (born 1989), Argentine footballer

== See also ==
- Victor (name)
