= 1938 Gettysburg reunion =

American Civil War veterans reunion

- Gettysburg College & Gettysburg National Military Park in United States
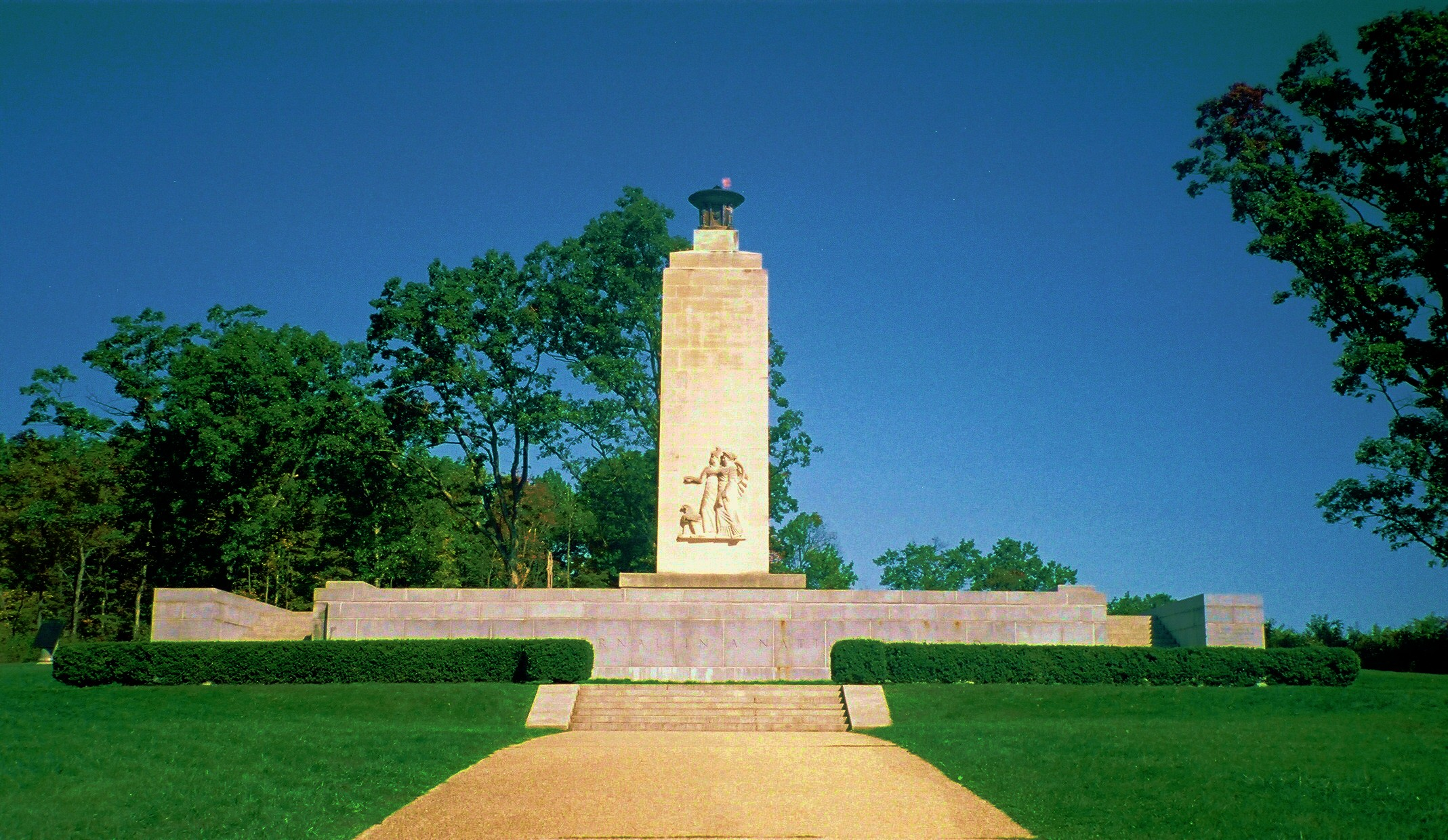
- North of the veterans' camp, the Eternal Light Peace Memorial was unveiled during the reunion.

Location
- Location within Pennsylvania
- Coordinates: 39.8395°N 77.2366°W

Site history
- In use: June 29–July 6 ceremonies & events: June 1–4

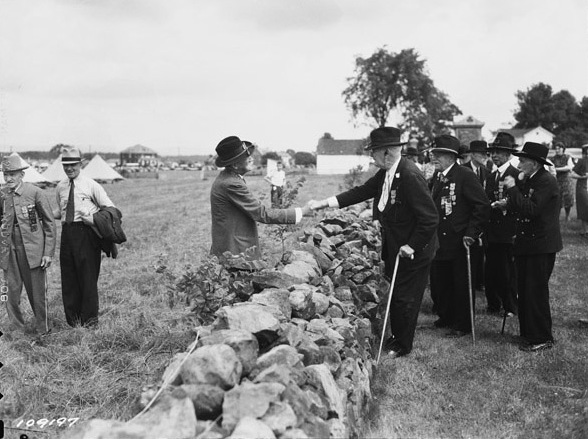
Union and Confederate veterans shaking hands over the rock wall at The Angle

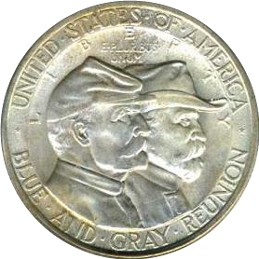
Commemorative coin (obverse shown)

External media

Images
- "ATTENDANT" medal issued to veteran's son
- Overhead view of dedication
- Roosevelt seated with white fedora
- Veterans: GAR & UCV commanders, Stamets/Turnbough/Vance, Tift/Gordon/Wilson/Bollinger, Hatch/Wingrove

Video
- Films of veterans, parade, camp, Roosevelt, unveiling, & handshake over stone wall with rebel yell
- Tank parade at college, Roosevelt in convertible & accepting memorial

The 1938 Gettysburg reunion was an encampment of American Civil War veterans on the Gettysburg Battlefield for the 75th anniversary of the Battle of Gettysburg. The gathering included approximately 25 veterans of the battle with a further 1,359 Federal and 486 Confederate attendees out of the 8,000 living veterans of the war. The veterans averaged 94 years of age. Transportation, quarters, and subsistence was federally funded for each veteran and their accompanying attendant. If an attendant was needed it was provided. President Franklin D. Roosevelt's July 3 reunion address preceded the unveiling of the Eternal Light Peace Memorial; a newsreel with part of the address was included in the Westinghouse Time Capsule for the 1939 New York World's Fair.

The reunion's support personnel included 19 officers and 250 enlisted men of the Pennsylvania National Guard, and there were 3,185 United States Army personnel in total. A "regular army camp" that displayed modern weapons was east of the northward tracks of the Reading Railroad to the Gettysburg College buildings, while the Third Corps headquarters tent was south of Gettysburg near The Angle. There were 548 police; from the Pennsylvania State Police and officers from New York City, Philadelphia, and Pittsburgh; and a Gettysburg College building was the "base hospital" under the First Regular Army Medical Regiment.

== Fundraising ==
To raise reunion funds, in June 1936 Congress authorized 50,000 US Mint commemorative half dollars. The Battle of Gettysburg half dollar was dated 1936 despite being struck in 1937. Sculptor Frank Vittor had used Union veteran James Power Stanley of the Battles of the Wilderness, Cold Harbor, North Anna, and Spotsylvania for the model, A special US postage stamp was also advocated for the reunion's opening day. Unsold coins were destroyed.

== Chronology ==
- 1935: Pennsylvania created a commission for the seventy-fifth anniversary of the battle of Gettysburg
- 1936: The House Military Affairs Committee recommended the Haines Bill for forming a federal committee to work with the Pennsylvania reunion commission.
- 1937 January 25: State senator John S. Rice, chairman of the Pennsylvania reunion commission, sponsored a bill for the commission to develop a memorial to be dedicated at the 1938 reunion, with a "Gettysburg Peace Memorial Fund" for an observation deck 75 ft (23 m) above the Big Round Top summit and a flame 30 feet higher (the abandoned 1910 plan was for a 1913 cornerstone at The Angle.)
- 1937 February 6: The first joint meeting of the federal and Pennsylvania state commissions.
- 1937 May 8: The Pennsylvania reunion commission's headquarters at the Hotel Gettysburg annex began selling the "Gettysburg commemorative half dollars" for $1.65; the hotel and two Gettysburg banks also sold the coins.

=== 1938 ===
January 15: The navy sent the 75-man Marine Corps Band for the reunion (four other bands were also at the camp).
February: Gettysburg, Pennsylvania, formed a nine-person committee for the reunion.
April 18: The Works Progress Administration began improvements to the 25 sq mi (65 km^{2}) of the Gettysburg National Military Park.
April 26: Veterans' camp construction began at the "north end of Gettysburg College and on adjacent private property". The Civilian Conservation Corps (CCC) on Seminary Ridge provided manpower for building the veterans camp, and about 50 enrollees at CCC camp MP-2 of Company #1355-C served as guides for the veterans.
May 16: President Franklin D. Roosevelt signed the bill for the federal transportation and camp appropriations of $900,000 (federal memorial funding had also failed in 1912).
June 25: The 1st Medical Regiment arrived from Carlisle Barracks, Pennsylvania to provide medical care for the reunion.
June 29: Twelve special Pullman trains arrived carrying veterans (4 from the east, with the remainder from the north and west).

==== Events ====
July 1, Friday (Reunion Day): Opening ceremonies in the Gettysburg College Stadium were in the morning and included an address by Secretary of War Harry Hines Woodring, chairman of the United States Commission.

July 2, Saturday (Veterans' and Governors' Day)
- The 3-mile-long parade for 2 1/2 hours was between the reviewing stand in the college stadium and the intersection of the Baltimore Pike and the Emmitsburg Road, through the Lincoln Square; and included three groups: distinguished visitors first, followed by U. S. Army units and equipment, and more than 50 drum and bugle corps.
- A Marine Corps Band concert was held in the Gettysburg College stadium (the only remaining Jewish Civil War veteran, Daniel Harris, was a guest on the platform).

July 3, Sunday (President's Day)
- Sunday morning memorial service in college stadium
- Veterans shook hands across the stone wall at The Angle as during the 1913 Gettysburg reunion.
- Attendance for the Eternal Light Peace Memorial dedication was 250,000 (100,000 were "stuck on automobile-packed highways".)
- As Roosevelt's 9 minute address ended at sunset, the Peace Memorial covered by a 50-foot (15 m) flag was unveiled by George N. Lockwood and Confederate A. G. Harris (both age 91) with 2 regular army attendants.
- Army aircraft staged a simulated air raid on Gettysburg at dusk, and searchlights were directed from the ground at the planes while they dropped flares.

July 4, Monday (United States Army Day)
- Military demonstrations included maneuvers by "31 fast light tanks" (according to the New York Times account), likely the M2 light tank (the only light tank in the US arsenal at the time), of the 66th Infantry's Provisional Tank Battalion near the college's Glatfelter Hall and an air show with 18 Northrop A-17As from Barksdale Field and, from Langley Field, 18 Consolidated PB-2s & 6 B-17 Flying Fortresses.
- Fireworks were launched from the crest of Oak hill.

July 5: The 62nd Coastal Artillery departed for Fort Totten, the 12th Infantry (without 1 company) to Fort Howard (Maryland), and the Third Cavalry to Fort Myer.
July 6: The 66th Infantry departed for Fort Meade and the 6th Field Artillery to Fort Hoyle.
July 7: The 34th Infantry (without 1 company) departed for Fort Meade.
July 8: The 34th Infantry headquarters company departed for Fort Meade (the 8th Quartermaster Regiment remained until ~July 25 to dismantle the veterans camp.)
September 23: A World's Fair time capsule with a "permanent acetate film by RKO-Pathé" (15 minute newsreel) with part of Roosevelt's Gettysburg reunion address and numerous other events was lowered into a 50 ft well.

Veteran attendance/reservations
State	#
California	150
Texas	130
Pennsylvania	115
Ohio	103
Georgia	63
Florida	48
Mississippi	42
North Carolina	35
30 others, avg	34
Alabama	32
Tennessee	31
Maryland	22
South Carolina	19
Kentucky	16
Louisiana	15
Virginia	14
Arkansas	9
Nevada	1
Wyoming	1
Rhode Island	0
