= Honus & Me =

1997 children's novel by Dan Gutman

- First edition
- Author: Dan Gutman
- Language: English
- Genre: Realistic Fiction, Fantasy
- Publisher: Avon
- Publication date: 1997
- Publication place: United States
- Followed by: Jackie & Me

Honus & Me is a children's novel by Dan Gutman, published in 1997, and the first in the Baseball Card Adventures series. It was rejected by many publishers before HarperCollins finally accepted. It became a bestseller and was adapted into the 2004 made-for-television movie The Winning Season, starring Matthew Modine.

The book includes a factual epilogue by Gutman and vintage photographs of Honus Wagner.

== Plot ==
Joe Stoshack is infatuated with baseball. He knows everything there is to know about the game: except how to play well. When he takes a job cleaning a bunch of junk out of the attic of his neighbor, Miss Young, he finds a 1909 T-206 Honus Wagner card (the most valuable baseball card in the world). He tries to verify that it is authentic by going to a collectible shop. The owner, an ex "bad guy" professional wrestler named Birdie Farrell, tries to trick Joe into selling it for ten dollars by saying it's Heinie Wagner. When he goes to sleep that night, he's holding the baseball card, wishing he could meet Honus.

The next day, after one of his team's games, Joe finds himself face-to-face with baseball legend Honus Wagner. He plays catch with him, and Joe and Honus share their dreams with each other. Joe's is to play in the big leagues, while Honus's is to win the World Series. Together they travel back in time to the seventh game of the World Series, where Honus helps Joe boost his self-esteem and gain confidence in his ability to play baseball. Finally, Joe returns home more encouraged about his baseball future.

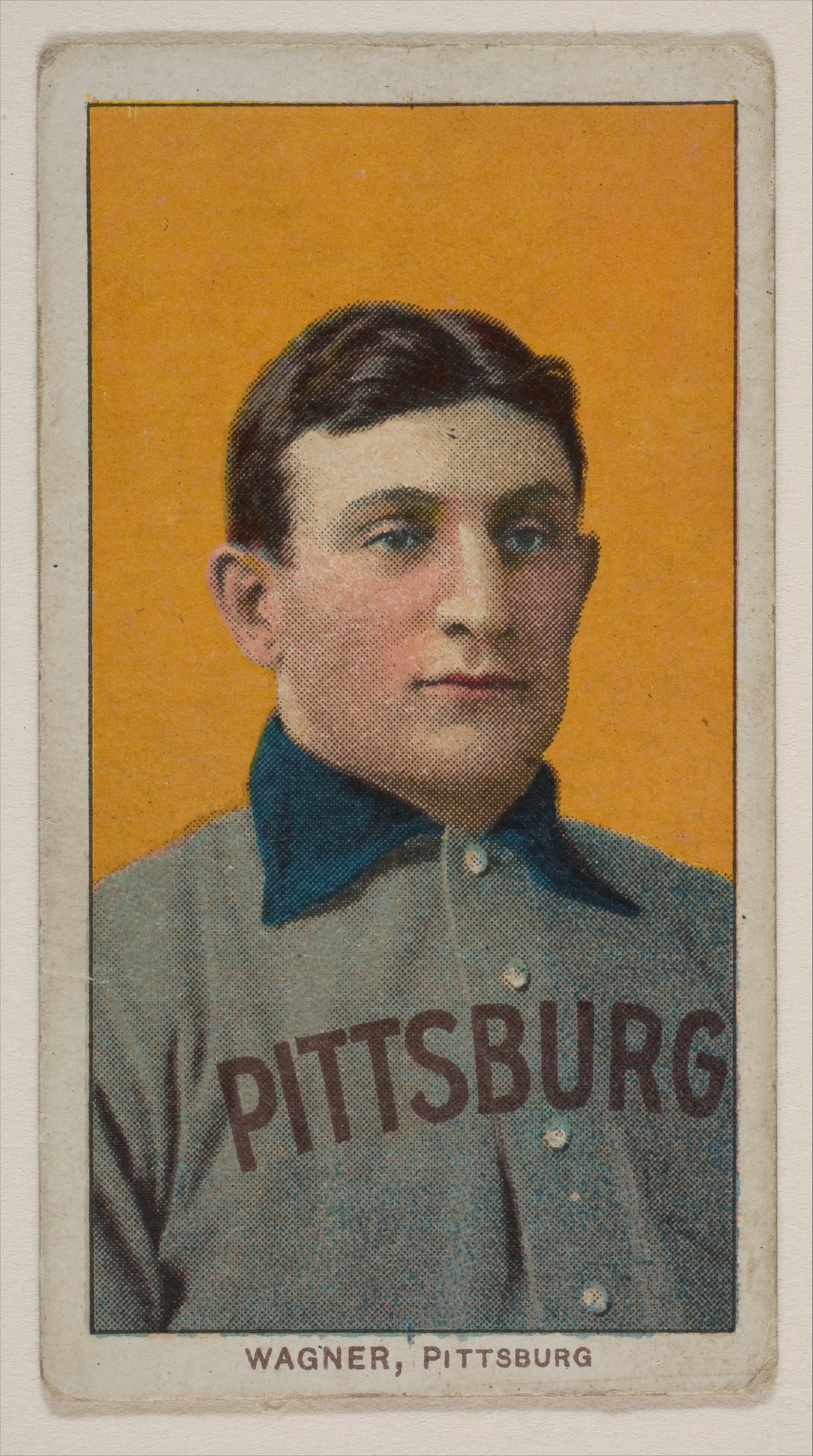
T-206 “white border” Honus Wagner baseball card

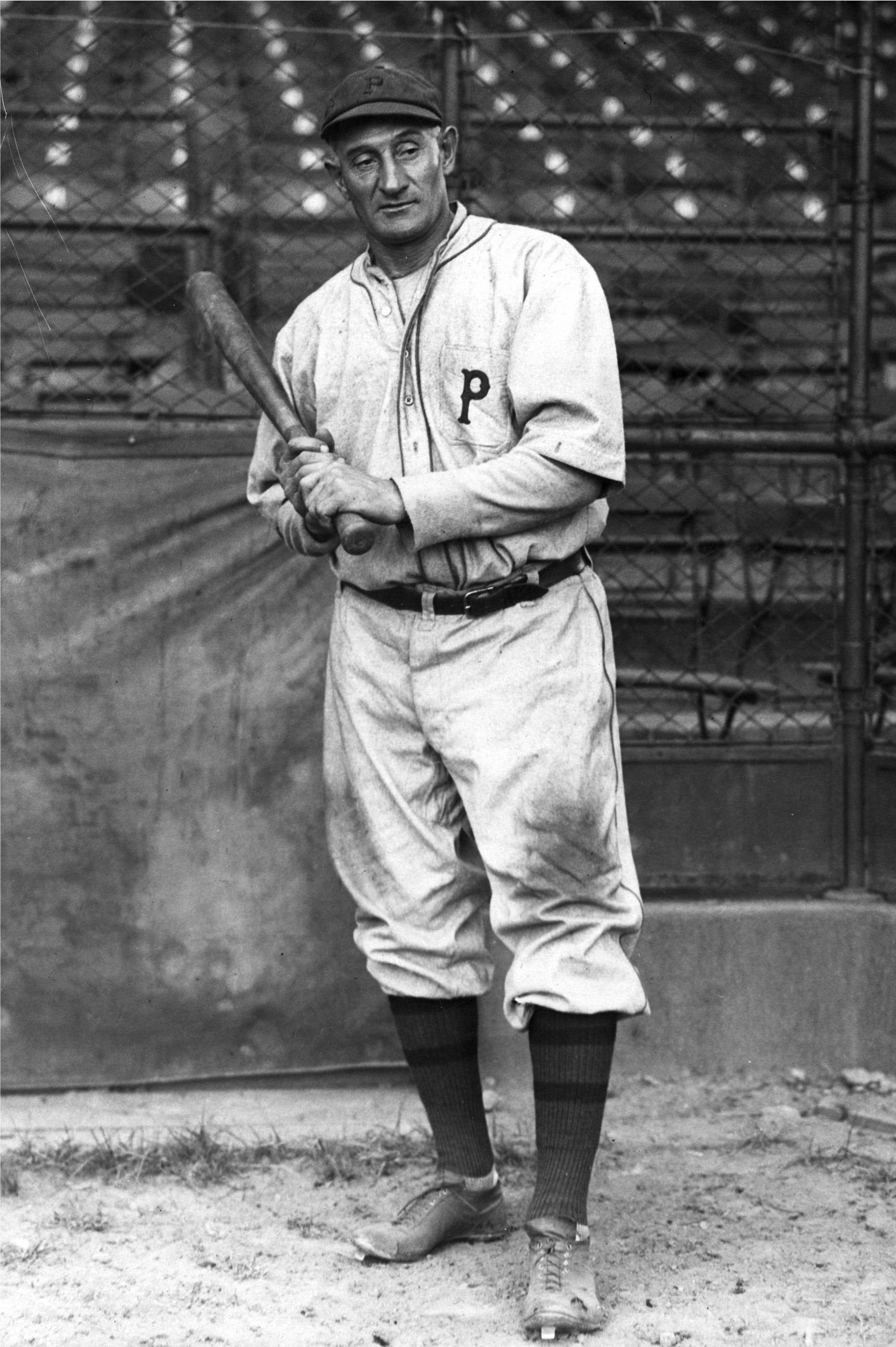
Honus Wagner, Pittsburgh Pirates

== Reviews ==
Publishers Weekly praised it as a "joyfully entertaining yarn", stating Gutman had a "direct, no-frills writing style" and said: "For sports fans who like a snappy plot along with the play-by-play, this novel hits at least a triple."

== The Winning Season ==
A film of the book was made by TNT, first broadcast April 4, 2004. It starred Matthew Modine as Honus Wagner, Kristen Davis as his love interest, and Mark Rendall as the young hero Joe Stoshack.
