= Battle of Gettysburg half dollar =

United States commemorative coin

- United States
- Value: 50 cents (0.50 US dollars)
- Mass: 12.5 g
- Diameter: 30.61 mm (1.20 in)
- Thickness: 2.15 mm (0.08 in)
- Edge: Reeded
- Composition: 90.0% silver; 10.0% copper
- Silver: 0.36169 troy oz
- Years of minting: 1937
- Mintage: 50,028 including 28 pieces for the Assay Commission (23,100 melted)
- Mint marks: None, all pieces struck at Philadelphia Mint without mint mark.

Obverse
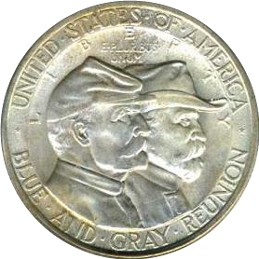
- Design: Portraits of Union and Confederate soldiers
- Designer: Frank Vittor

Reverse
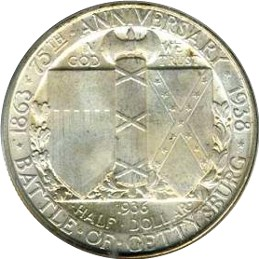
- Design: Union and Confederate shields divided by a fasces
- Designer: Frank Vittor

The Battle of Gettysburg half dollar was designed by Frank Vittor and minted in 1937, although it was dated 1936. It was struck to commemorate the 75th anniversary of the Battle of Gettysburg which was to be held in 1938.

== Battle of Gettysburg ==
The Battle of Gettysburg was fought July 1–3, 1863, in and around the town of Gettysburg, Pennsylvania, by Union and Confederate forces during the American Civil War. The battle involved the largest number of casualties of the entire war and is often described as the war's turning point. Union Maj. Gen. George Meade's Army of the Potomac defeated attacks by Confederate Gen. Robert E. Lee's Army of Northern Virginia, halting Lee's invasion of the North. The battle took place over three days and took the lives of 23,000–28,000 (estimated) Confederates and 23,049 Union soldiers

== Description ==
Two United States Civil War veterans, one from the Union camp and one from the Confederate camp, are featured on the obverse of the coin. E pluribus unum ("Out of Many, One"), the de facto United States national motto until 1956, is displayed prominently above the two war veterans, with the "E" serving as both the first letter of the motto and the middle letter of Liberty.

== See also ==
- List of United States commemorative coins and medals (1930s)
