= My Weird School =

Ongoing series of children's novels

- First book in the series
- Author: Dan Gutman
- Illustrator: Jim Paillot
- Language: English
- Genre: Humor, children's literature

My Weird School is a series of humorous chapter books written by Dan Gutman and illustrated by Jim Paillot, first published in late June 2004. Further series include My Weird School Daze (2008-2011), My Weirder School (2011-2014), My Weirdest School (2015-2018), My Weirder-est School (2019-2022), and My Weird-tastic School (2023-2026).

The series takes place in a school whose teachers display bizarre behaviors, with each title focusing on a specific teacher. Each book in the series has a rhyme in the title. The main character, A.J., is a boy who hates school. His rival is a girl named Andrea, who loves school and has a friend, Emily, that A.J. considers a "crybaby." Much of the humor is derived from the plot's unlikely situations and the teachers' personalities which are written to be "outlandish."

Gutman was initially inspired to write the books after being exposed to the Junie B. Jones series by Barbara Park and wanted to write something similar from a boy's point of view. Gutman says that he has been inspired by visiting real-life schools, going to 60 schools a year to gather material. He has also stated that his goal in writing the books is to interest children in reading and especially to make reading fun for children who have difficulty in school. The series' defining characteristic of strange teachers comes from Gutman's belief that children enjoy reading about "grownups doing dumb things." Gutman feels that along with having his own son, the series My Weird School helped launch his writing career.

== Books ==
=== My Weird School (2004-2008) ===
1. Miss Daisy Is Crazy!. New York: Harper Trophy. 2004. ISBN 9780060507008.
2. Mr. Klutz Is Nuts!. New York: Harper Trophy. 2004. ISBN 9780060507022.
3. Mrs. Roopy Is Loopy!. New York: Harper Trophy. 2004. ISBN 9780060745226.
4. Ms. Hannah is Bananas!. New York: Harper Collins. 2005. ISBN 9780060507060.
5. Miss Small Is Off the Wall!. New York: Harper Collins. 2005. ISBN 9780060745196.
6. Mr. Hynde Is Out of His Mind!. New York: Harper Collins. 2005. ISBN 9780060745202.
7. Mrs. Cooney Is Loony!. New York: Harper Trophy. 2005. ISBN 9780060745226.
8. Ms. LaGrange Is Strange!. New York: Harper Trophy. 2005. ISBN 9780060822231.
9. Miss Lazar Is Bizarre!. New York: Harper Collins. 2005. ISBN 9780060822255.
10. Mr. Docker Is Off His Rocker!. New York: Harper Trophy. 2006. ISBN 9780060822279.
11. Mrs. Kormel Is Not Normal!. New York: Harper Collins. 2006. ISBN 9780060822309.
12. Ms.Todd Is Odd!. New York: Harper Collins. 2006. ISBN 9780060822323.
13. Mrs. Patty Is Batty!. New York: Harper Trophy. 2006. ISBN 9780060853808.
14. Miss Holly Is Too Jolly!. New York: Harper Trophy. 2006. ISBN 9780060853822.
15. Mr. Macky Is Wacky!. New York: Harper Trophy. 2006. ISBN 9780061141515.
16. Ms. Coco Is Loco!. New York: Harper Trophy. 2007. ISBN 9780061141539.
17. Miss Suki Is Kooky!. New York: Harper Trophy. 2007. ISBN 9780061234736.
18. Mrs. Yonkers Is Bonkers!. New York: Harper Trophy. 2007. ISBN 9780061234750.
19. Dr. Carbles Is Losing His Marbles!. New York: Harper Trophy. 2007. ISBN 9780061234774.
20. Mr. Louie Is Screwy!. New York: Harper Collins. 2007. ISBN 9780061234798.
21. Ms. Krup Cracks Me Up!. New York: Harper Trophy. 2008. ISBN 9780061346064.

=== My Weird School Daze (2008-2011) ===
1. Mrs. Dole Is Out Of Control!. New York: Harper Trophy. 2008. ISBN 9780061346071.
2. Mr. Sunny Is Funny!. New York: Harper Trophy. 2008. ISBN 9780061346095.
3. Mr. Granite Is From Another Planet!. New York: Harper Trophy. 2008. ISBN 9780061346125.
4. Coach Hyatt Is a Riot!. New York: Harper Trophy. 2009. ISBN 9780061554063.
5. Officer Spence Makes No Sense!. New York: Harper Trophy. 2009. ISBN 9780061554100.
6. Mrs. Jafee Is Daffy!. New York: Harper Trophy. 2009. ISBN 9780061554131.
7. Dr. Brad Has Gone Mad!. New York: Harper Collins. 2009. ISBN 9780062288912.
8. Miss Laney Is Zany!. New York: Harper Collins. 2010. ISBN 9780061554155.
9. Mrs. Lizzy Is Dizzy!. New York: Harper. 2010. ISBN 9780061554186.
10. Miss Mary Is Scary!. New York: Harper. 2010. ISBN 9780061703980.
11. Mr. Tony Is Full of Baloney!. New York: Harper. 2010. ISBN 9780061704000.
12. Ms. Leakey Is Freaky!. New York: Harper Collins. 2011. ISBN 9780061704031.

=== My Weirder School (2011-2014) ===
1. Miss Child Has Gone Wild!. New York: Harper Collins. 2011. ISBN 9780061969171.
2. Mr. Harrison Is Embarrassin'!. New York: Harper. 2011. ISBN 9780061969195.
3. Mrs. Lilly Is Silly!. New York: Harper. 2011. ISBN 9780061969201.
4. Mr. Burke Is Berserk!. New York: Harper. 2012. ISBN 9780061969232.
5. Ms. Beard Is Weird!. New York: Harper. 2012. ISBN 9780062042101.
6. Mayor Hubble Is in Trouble!. New York: Harper. 2012. ISBN 9780062042132.
7. Miss Kraft Is Daft!. New York: Harper. 2013. ISBN 9780062042163.
8. Dr. Nicholas Is Ridiculous!. New York: Harper. 2013. ISBN 9780062042187.
9. Ms. Sue Has No Clue!. New York: Harper. 2013. ISBN 9780062198396.
10. Mr. Jack Is a Maniac!. New York: Harper. 2014. ISBN 9780062198426.
11. Miss Klute Is a Hoot!. New York: Harper. 2014. ISBN 9780062198440.
12. Mrs. Lane Is a Pain!. New York: Harper Collins. 2014. ISBN 9780062198471.

=== My Weird School Special (2013-2014/2019-) ===
Various spinoff specials have been published since 2013.

1. It's Halloween, I'm Turning Green!. New York: Harper Collins. 2013. ISBN 9780062206794.
2. Deck the Halls, We're Off the Walls!. New York: Harper Collins. 2013. ISBN 9780062206831.
3. Bunny Double, We're in Trouble!. New York: Harper Collins. 2014. ISBN 9780062284006.
4. Back to School, Weird Kids Rule!. New York: Harper Collins. 2014. ISBN 9780062206855.
5. Oh, Valentine, We've Lost Our Minds!. New York: Harper Collins. 2014. ISBN 9780606364607.
6. Bummer in the Summer!. New York: Harper Collins. 2019. ISBN 9780062796813.
7. We're Red, Weird and Blue! What Can We Do?. New York: Harper Collins. 2020. ISBN 9780062796844.
8. The Leprechaun is Finally Gone!. Harper Collins. 2022.
9. No More School, April Fools!. Harper Collins. 2024.
10. There's a Skunk in My Bunk!. Harper Collins. 2024.
11. Hip, Hip, Hooray! Every Day Is a Holiday!. Harper Collins. 2024.
12. I'm a Poet, and I Know It!. Harper Collins. 2025.
13. Fright Night!. Harper Collins. 2025.

=== My Weirdest School (2015-2018) ===
1. Mr. Cooper Is Super!. New York: Harper Collins. 2015. ISBN 9780062284228.
2. Ms. Cuddy Is Nutty!. New York: Harper Collins. 2015. ISBN 9780062284242.
3. Miss Brown Is Upside Down!. New York: Harper Collins. 2016. ISBN 9780062284273.
4. Mrs. Meyer Is On Fire!. New York: Harper Collins. 2016. ISBN 9780062284327.
5. Miss Daisy Is Still Crazy!. New York: Harper Trophy. 2016. ISBN 9780062284358.
6. Mr. Nick Is A Lunatic!. New York: Harper Trophy. 2016. ISBN 9780062284372.
7. Ms. Joni Is A Phony!. New York: Harper Trophy. 2017. ISBN 9780062429315.
8. Mrs. Master Is A Disaster!. New York: Harper Trophy. 2017. ISBN 9780062429339.
9. Miss Tracy Is Spacey!. New York: Harper Trophy. 2017. ISBN 9780062429360.
10. Miss Newman Isn't Human!. New York: Harper Trophy. 2018. ISBN 9780062429407.
11. Mr. Will Needs To Chill!. New York: Harper Trophy. 2018. ISBN 9780062429438.
12. Ms. Hall Is A Goofball!. New York: Harper Trophy. 2018. ISBN 9780062429469.

=== My Weird School: I Can Read (2016-2018) ===
A series of early reading books as part of the I Can Read! line.

1. My Weird School Goes To the Museum. New York: Harper Trophy. 2016. ISBN 9780062367440.
2. My Weird School Talent Show Mix-Up. New York: Harper Trophy. 2016. ISBN 9780062367402.
3. My Weird School Class Pet Mess!. New York: Harper Trophy. 2017. ISBN 9780062367471.
4. My Weird School Teamwork Trouble. New York: Harper Trophy. 2018. ISBN 9780062367495.

=== My Weirder-est School (2019-2022) ===
1. Dr. Snow Has Got to Go!. New York: Harper. 2019. ISBN 9780062691026.
2. Miss Porter Is Out of Order!. New York: Harper. 2019. ISBN 9780062691040.
3. Dr. Floss Is the Boss!. New York: Harper. 2019. ISBN 9780062691071.
4. Miss Blake Is a Flake!. New York: Harper. 2020. ISBN 9780062691118.
5. Mr. Marty Loves a Party!. New York: Harper. 2020. ISBN 9780062691149.
6. Mrs. Bacon Is Fakin'!. New York: Harper. 2020. ISBN 9780062691170.
7. Ms. Jo-Jo Is a Yo-Yo!. New York: Harper. 2021. ISBN 9780062910417.
8. Miss. Aker is a Maker!. New York: Harper. 2021. ISBN 9780062910448.
9. Mrs. Barr Has Gone Too Far!. Harper. 2021.
10. Mr. Ott is a Crackpot!. Harper. 2022.
11. Mrs. Stoker is a Joker!. Harper. 2022.
12. Lil Mouse is in the House!. Harper. 2022.

=== My Weird School Fast Facts (2016-2019) ===
A series of nonfiction books with facts presented by A.J. and Andrea.

1. Geography. New York: Harper Collins. 2016. ISBN 9780062306210.
2. Sports. New York: Harper Collins. 2016. ISBN 9780062306180.
3. Explorers, Presidents, and Toilets. New York: Harper. 2017. ISBN 9780062306234.
4. Space, Humans, and Farts. New York: Harper. 2017. ISBN 9780062306272.
5. Dogs, Cats, and Dung Beetles. New York: Harper. 2018. ISBN 9780062673077.
6. Dinosaurs, Dodos, and Woolly Mammoths. New York: Harper. 2018. ISBN 9780062673107.
7. Mummies, Myths, and Mysteries. New York: Harper. 2019. ISBN 9780062673138.
8. Pizza, Peanut Butter, and Pickles. New York: Harper. 2019. ISBN 9780062673152.

=== My Weird School Graphic Novel (2021-2023) ===
A series of graphic novels.

1. Mr. Corbett Is In Orbit!. New York: Harper Alley. 2021. ISBN 9780062947611.
2. Get A Grip We're On A Trip. Harper Alley. 2022.
3. Dorks in New York!. Harper Alley. 2023.

=== My Weirdtastic School (2023-present) ===
1. Miss Banks Pulls Lots of Pranks!. HarperCollins. 2023.
2. Uncle Fred Is a Knucklehead!. HarperCollins. 2023.
3. Professor Pitt Is a Nitwit!. HarperCollins. 2023.
4. Miss Nichol Is in a Pickle!. HarperCollins. 2024.
5. Mrs. Marge Is in Charge!. HarperCollins. 2024.
6. Ms. Greene Is Mean!. HarperCollins. 2024.
7. Mr. and Mrs. Phelps Need Some Help!. HarperCollins. 2025.
8. Mr. Plummer Is Dumber!. HarperCollins. 2025
9. Miss Sherman Is Determined!. HarperCollins. 2025
10. Mrs. Granger Is In Danger!. HarperCollins. 2026
11. Mr. DiPilla Is a Gorilla!. HarperCollins. 2026
12. Mrs. Towne Is a Clown!. HarperCollins. 2026

=== Supplementary books and media ===
Disappointed by the writing skills of the fans who write him letters, Gutman created a spinoff book in 2013, My Weird Writing Tips, to teach readers how to write.

Audiobook versions of My Weird School have been bundled together with books 1-4 released together.

During lockdowns associated with COVID-19, Gutman has hosted a "My Weird Read-A-Loud" series. Gutman has also read online from the My Weird School series for #OperationStoryTime on Instagram, Facebook and YouTube.

== Reception ==
Kirkus Reviews said that the first book, Miss Daisy is Crazy!, is "a sure-fire hit for the most reluctant reader." Publishers Weekly also notes that the series is a good choice for beginning readers. The Reading Teacher mentioned the series in their 2008 article on choosing books for children that they will enjoy reading. Some books, such as Class Pet Mess!, do contain more challenging vocabulary. Mrs. Cooney Is Looney! uses homophones to provide humor.

My Weirder School continues the trend of using humor that began in the My Weird School series. Booklist calls the series habit forming, writing, "Fortunately, the habit is reading." Booklist has also called the depiction of some of the adults in the series as "satire."

The Weird School Fast Facts series has been reviewed favorably. School Library Journal called the drawings "hilarious" in both My Weird School Fast Facts: Sports and My Weird School Fast Facts: Geography. School Library Journal also noted that Gutman's writing was especially suited to his audience of younger readers. Booklist wrote that Sports was entertaining and informative.

My Weird Writing Tips is a book written to help students become better writers. School Library Journal wrote that the book makes "grammar entertaining," but criticized the introduction for not being sensitive to the issues faced by bilingual students and others who have trouble with grammar. Booklist, however, felt that My Weird Writing Tips was extremely funny and informative for a broad group of young readers. Kirkus Reviews found the book to have useful information even if the tone of the book was "disingenuous at times and too self-consciously fun."

The first four books released as an audiobook in 2005 were read by John Beach. His narration was good at capturing the voices of the characters in the stories, according to Booklist. School Library Journal praised the narration of Jared Goldsmith on the audiobook, Miss Cooney Is Looney!, for capturing the voice of A.J. in a way that "brings him to life."

The series has been very successful with young readers, although Common Sense Media notes in a review that the series sometimes reinforces gender stereotypes. The series also receives criticism for characters having caricatured personalities and repetitive plots.

== Film adaptation ==
My Weird School
- Directed by: Jonathan Judge
- Written by: Shauna Phelan; Dan Gutman
- Produced by: Brin Lukens
- Starring: Hero Hunter; Harper Zilmer; Aaron Harris; Nakai Takawira; Sean Sotaridona; Peter Oldring; Liv Pearsall; Annie Chen; Amanda Khan; KreekCraft; Adam Rose
- Cinematography: Carlos González
- Music by: Nikhil Seetharam
- Production companies: Nickelodeon Movies; Quick to Judge
- Distributed by: Paramount+ Nickelodeon
- Release date: December 30, 2025
- Running time: 84 minutes
- Country: United States
- Language: English

A film adaptation titled My Weird School premiered on Nickelodeon on December 30, 2025, directed by Jonathan Judge and starring Adam Rose as Mr. Small. The adaptation was announced in October 2024, a film based on the book series to be in production by Nickelodeon Movies. It was only shown once, on Nickelodeon on December 30, 2025, and was not advertised. The film was released to mixed-to-positive reviews, with criticism mainly directed towards its departures from the source material.

=== Premise ===
A.J. Williams, along with his best friends, Ryan and Lex are starting 6th grade in a place called Mid Dell Middle School. A.J., however hates school as much as he hates Andrea, the know-it-all, pencil pushing, star student and his mortal enemy. The first day of school was just as bad as A.J. knew it would, but on the second day, things got a lot weird with not just the teachers, but the entire school itself. With uniforms, dusty textbooks, bad cafeteria food, and strange behavior coming from the faculty, it's up to A.J. and his friends to figure out why this school has turned out weird. With the help of Andrea, new friend Todd, and quirky new gym teacher, Mr. Small, A.J. is going to do the impossible: save the school from an alien invasion. Weird, right?

=== Cast ===
- Hero Hunter as A.J. Williams
- Harper Zilmer as Lex Juarez
- Aaron Harris as Ryan Dole
- Nakai Takawira as Andrea Young
- Sean Sotaridona as Todd
- Peter Oldring as Principal Klutz
- Liv Pearsall as Ms. LaGrange
- Annie Chen as Ms. Lazar
- Amanda Khan as Mademoiselle Dubois
- Forrest "KreekCraft" Waldron as Himself
- Adam Rose as Mr. Small
- Mariesa Crouse as Ms. Hannah
- MasterDev as Game Maker Kid
- Devon Sall as Student/Meatloaf Kid
