= Statue of Honus Wagner =

Sculpture in Pittsburgh, Pennsylvania

- J. P. "Honus" Wagner
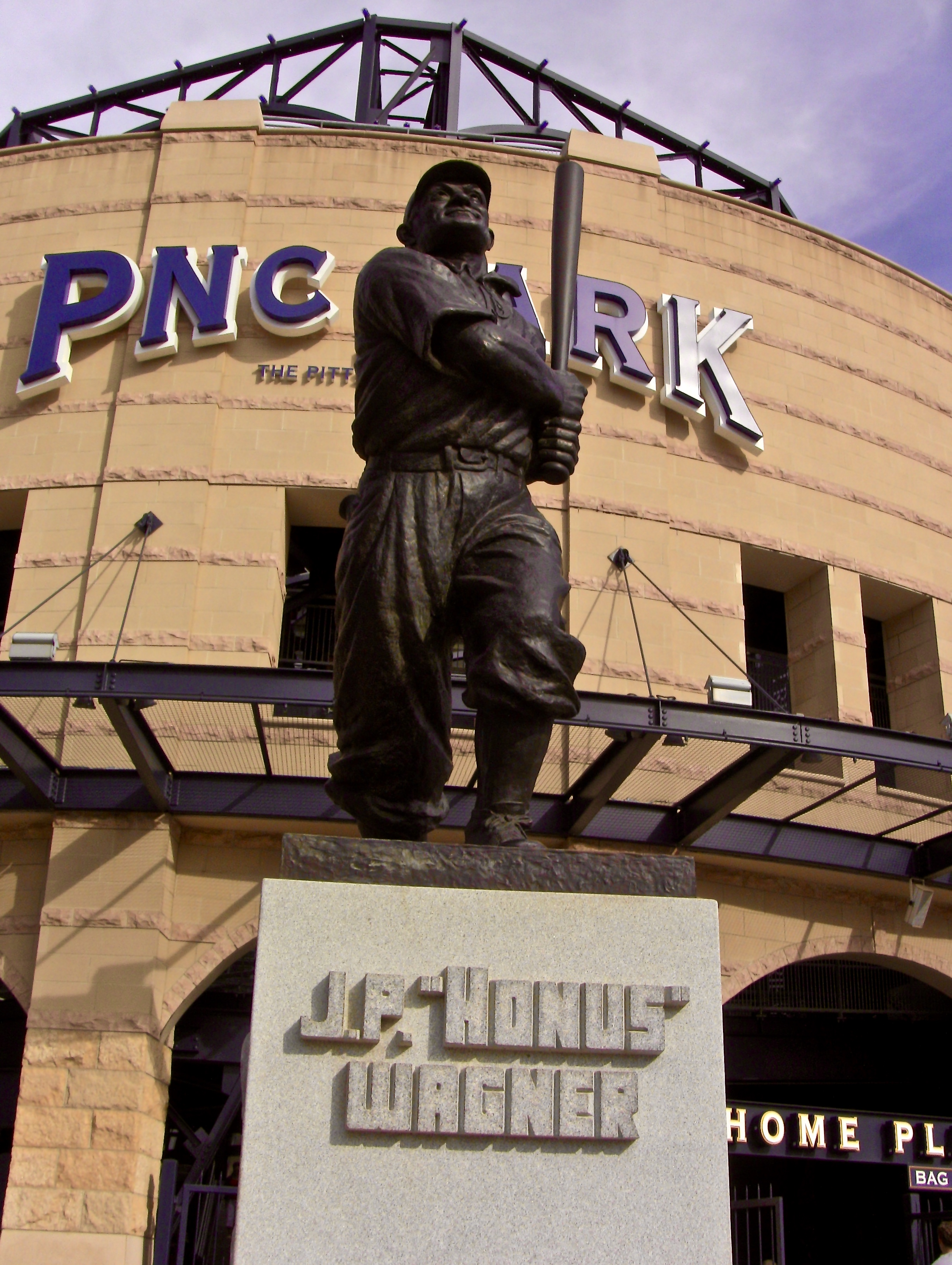
- Artist: Frank Vittor
- Year: 1955
- Medium: Bronze sculpture
- Subject: Honus Wagner
- Location: PNC Park Pittsburgh, Pennsylvania, U.S.

The statue of Honus Wagner was dedicated by the Pittsburgh Pirates to honor their Baseball Hall of Fame shortstop Honus Wagner. Created by sculptor Frank Vittor, it originally stood outside Forbes Field but now stands outside the home plate entrance of PNC Park, the Pirates' current ballpark.

== Information ==
The statue was created by sculptor Frank Vittor and was sponsored by the Pittsburgh Professional Baseball Association as "a lasting tribute to his character and abilities." It was dedicated on April 30, 1955, at Schenley Park, just outside the left-field fence of Forbes Field, with then-MLB Commissioner Ford Frick in attendance. During the ceremony, Frick said:

Honus Wagner as an individual contributed as much as any man who ever lived in baseball. I am proud for Honus, I am proud for baseball, and proud of Pittsburgh in recognizing the contribution Honus made to the game.

The statue was relocated to Three Rivers Stadium in 1972 and again to PNC Park in 2001 where it currently stands, just outside the home plate entrance.

Inside the statue, sealed in a tube, are a list of names of former and then-current Pirates' players who gave contributions to the statue at the time of its dedication.

The statue has the following inscription on it:

J.P. "HONUS"

WAGNER

ERECTED IN 1955
BY THE FANS OF AMERICA
IN HONOR OF A BASEBALL IMMORTAL
A CHAMPION AMONG CHAMPIONS
WHOSE RECORD ON AND OFF THE
PLAYING FIELD OF THE NATIONAL GAME
WILL EVER STAND AS A MONUMENT
TO HIS OWN GREATNESS
AND AS AN EXAMPLE AND INSPIRATION TO THE YOUTH
OF OUR COUNTRY

SPONSORED BY
THE PITTSBURGH PROFESSIONAL BASEBALL ASSOCIATION
RELOCATED BY THE PITTSBURGH BASEBALL CLUB
FROM SCHENLEY PARK TO THREE RIVERS STADIUM
AND REDEDICATED JULY 21, 1972

SO THAT FUTURE PIRATE FANS WILL BE REMINDED OF
HONUS WAGNER'S CONTRIBUTIONS TO BASEBALL IN PITTSBURGH.

== See also ==
- Honus Wagner
- T206 Honus Wagner
