= The Million Dollar Putt =

Book by Dan Gutman

- First edition, hardcover dust jacket
- Author: Dan Gutman
- Cover artist: Michael Koelsch
- Language: English
- Series: The Million Dollar... series
- Genre: Realistic fiction
- Publisher: Hyperion Books for Children
- Publication date: 2006
- Publication place: United States
- Media type: Book
- Pages: 169
- ISBN: 978-0-7868-3641-3
- OCLC: 61240786
- LC Class: PZ7.G9846 Mh 2006

The Million Dollar Putt is a realistic fiction novel written by Dan Gutman in 2006. It is about a young blind child's quest to learn golf and win a million dollar prize.

== Plot ==
Edward Bogard ("Bogie" for short) is a 13-year-old blind boy who lives in Hawaii with his widowed father. Though blind, he rides a bike, parasails, and plays guitar. When he decides to take up golf he has to enlist the aid of his neighbor, a young girl named Birdie. As their friendship develops, it turns out that Bogie also has the driving touch of a professional golfer. Someone anonymously enters him into a golf tournament and the two join forces to try to win the million

== Reviews ==
School Library Journal stated that the "novel's appeal is enhanced by humorous, lively dialogue; the innocence of the main characters; and the positive portrayal of their relationship and disabilities."

Kliatt says that the author "has another winner here in this appealing sports tale about an unusual protagonist and the value of confronting one's fears."

== Awards ==
The book was nominated for the Mark Twain Award for 2009.

== Series ==
Other novels in the series are The Million Dollar Shot (basketball), The Million Dollar Kick (soccer), The Million Dollar Goal (ice hockey), and The Million Dollar Strike (bowling). The books have different protagonists but a similar premise. In promotion of Gutman's new novel The Million Dollar Putt, Hyperion Books for Children republished the authors' previous four books in his Million Dollar series, hiring Michael Koelsch to illustrate new cover artworks for all five novels.
