= Statue of Christopher Columbus (Pittsburgh) =

Statue in Pittsburgh, Pennsylvania, U.S.

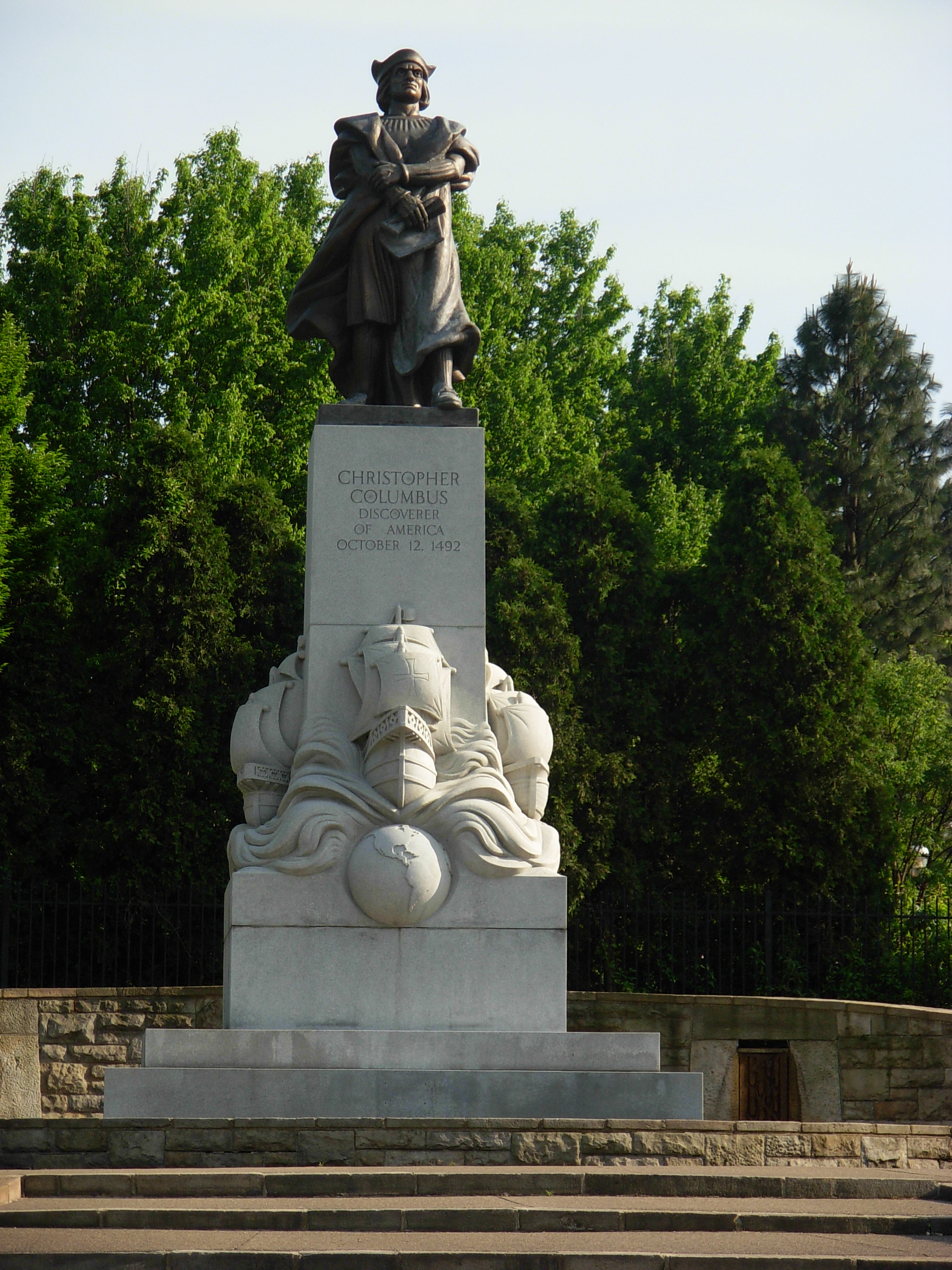
- The statue in 2007
- Subject: Christopher Columbus
- Location: Pittsburgh, Pennsylvania, U.S.; 40°26′25.0″N 79°56′54.4″W

A statue of Christopher Columbus is installed in Pittsburgh's Schenley Park, in the U.S. state of Pennsylvania.

== Description and history ==
The 50-foot tall bronze and granite statue was designed by the Italian American sculptor Frank Vittor and installed in 1958. In 2020, the sculpture was covered and the Pittsburgh Art Commission voted unanimously in favor of its removal.

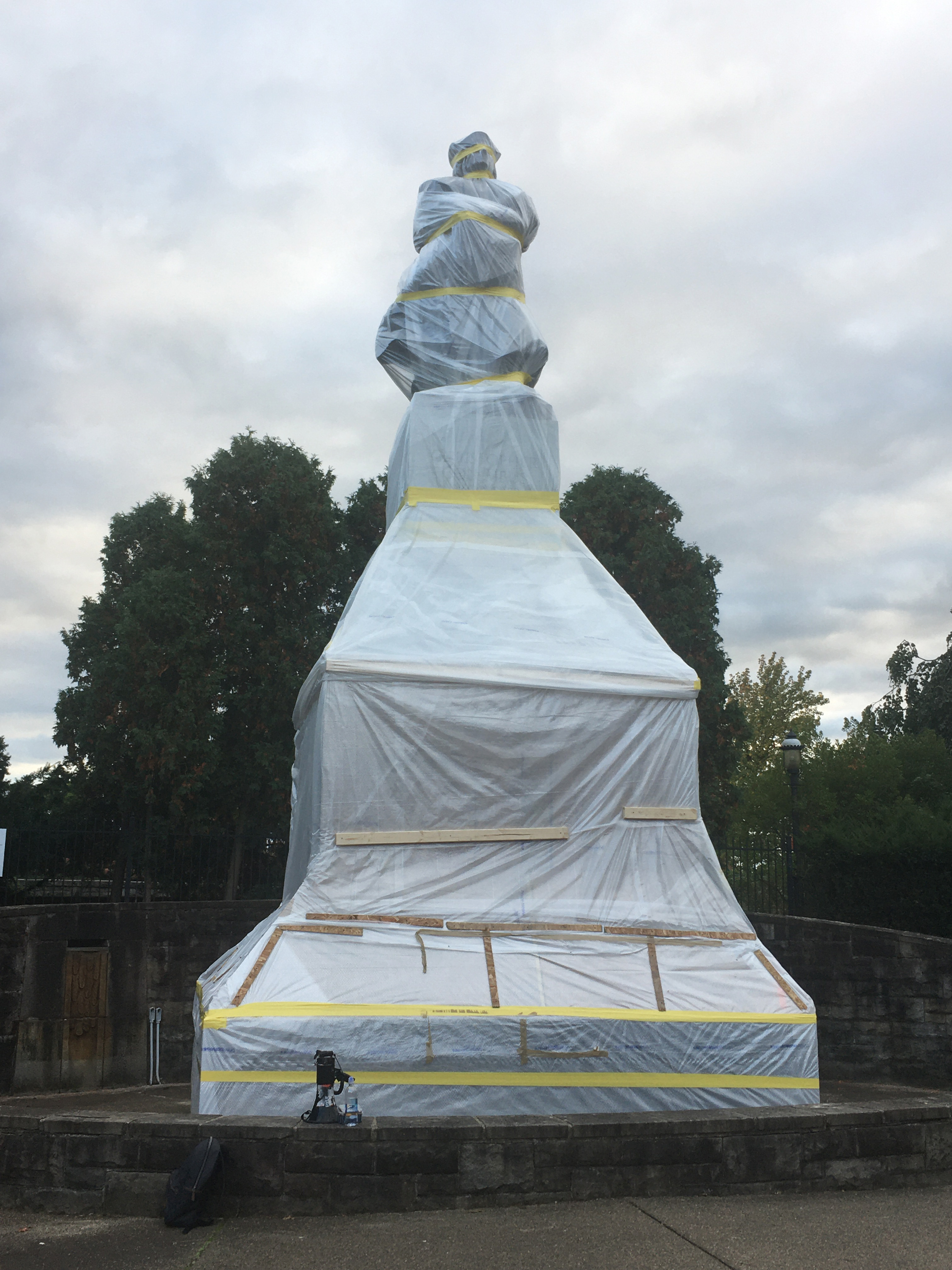
Covered statue, 2020

== See also ==
- List of monuments and memorials to Christopher Columbus
