= The Million Dollar Kick =

- Author: Dan Gutman
- Language: English
- Genre: Children's sports novel
- Publisher: Hyperion Book CH
- Publication date: 2001
- Publication place: United States
- Media type: Print
- ISBN: 978-0786826124

The Million Dollar Kick is a children's story written by American novelist Dan Gutman, another installment in the Million Dollar book series, following The Million Dollar Shot. It was first published by Hyperion Books for Children in 2001. In promotion of Gutman's 2006 novel The Million Dollar Putt, Hyperion Books for Children republished the authors previous four books in his Million Dollar series, hiring Michael Koelsch to illustrate new cover artworks for all five novels.

== Plot ==
13-year-old Whisper Nelson despises sports ever since when in third grade, she accidentally scored an own goal during a soccer game at a field by Lake Overholser. Sooner later, when her sister is too young to sign up, she signs up for a contest in which the winner gets a chance to score a goal for one million dollars against famous goalie Carmen Applegate. The winner is chosen by the best ad for the Kick, Oklahoma City's soccer team, and Whisper's ('The Kick Kick Butt') wins the contest. Whisper meets Ellie, who soon becomes her teacher to prepare for the big day. Whisper ends up on the news for winning the ad contest, and ends up in the newspaper as well.

== See also ==
- The Million Dollar Shot, another book in the series, involving basketball.
- The Million Dollar Goal, another book in the series, involving ice hockey.
- The Million Dollar Putt, another book in the series, involving golf.
