= The Million Dollar Shot =

2006 children's book by Dan Gutman

First edition (publ. Little, Brown)

The Million Dollar Shot is a children's story written by Dan Gutman. It is held by over 1100 US and Canadian libraries, according to WorldCat. In promotion of Gutman's 2006 novel The Million Dollar Putt, Hyperion Books for Children republished the author’s previous four books in his Million Dollar series, hiring Michael Koelsch to illustrate new cover artworks for all five novels.

== Plot ==
Finkle Foods, a snack company, is holding a contest, with the grand prize being a trip to New York City to take a free throw shot at an NBA Finals game that, if made, would give the winner a million dollars.

No one needed (or deserved) this money as much as Eddie Ball, a boy who lives in a trailer park in Louisiana with his widowed mother, Rebecca Ball. Rebecca had recently been laid off from Finkle Foods, and Eddie was determined to run George Finkle, the founder, out of business. He entered the contest by writing a rap poem, which was upon hearing it, turned down by his friend and neighbor Annie "Oakley" Stokely. Annie wrote another poem, which went:

'How could the pilgrims e'er be contented,
'When savory Finkle's had not been invented?'

Annie's poem won the contest, though Eddie took credit for it. With the help of Annie's father, Bobby Stokely, Eddie trained long and hard to make the million-dollar shot in June.

Not everyone was in Eddie's favor, however. George Finkle himself tried to bribe Eddie to miss the shot, offering him his mother's job back and all the Finkles he could eat, but Eddie declined. He knew Finkle had been spying on him while practicing and thus knew how good he was at shooting.

Eddie arrived in New York for the game and, under monumental pressure, made the free throw, winning the million dollar prize. As it turned out, the company's products and facilities caused cancer in consumers, and Finkle Foods was shut down by the U.S. Food and Drug Administration (FDA) the next day. Eddie bought the company with his prize money and, with the help of his mother and the Stokelys, created the Air Ball Company, with the main product being the Air Ball Crunchy, a snack of his mother's invention originally shot down by Finkle Foods. The Air Ball Company's motto was:

'How could the pilgrims e'er be contented,'
'When Air Ball Crunchies had not been invented?'

== See also ==
- The Million Dollar Kick, another book in the series, involving soccer.
- The Million Dollar Goal, another book in the series, involving ice hockey.
- The Million Dollar Putt, another book in the series, involving golf.
