= The Million Dollar Goal =

2003 novel by Dan Gutman

First edition (publ. Hyperion Books)

The Million Dollar Goal is a children's sports novel by American author Dan Gutman, first published by Hyperion Books for Children in 2003. It is part of the Million Dollar series, in which different sports have a competition involving a million dollar reward. In this book, the sport is ice hockey. In promotion of Gutman's 2006 novel The Million Dollar Putt, Hyperion Books for Children republished the authors previous four books in his Million Dollar series, hiring Michael Koelsch to illustrate new cover artworks for all five novels.

== Plot summary ==
Twins Dawn and Dusk Rosenberg love hockey, and have been playing hockey since they were in the mighty mite league. They live outside Montreal, and their dad does not have much of a connection to hockey than to baseball. Mr. Rosenberg would never buy hockey gear for Dawn or Dusk, and makes them pay with their own money. The two even wrote haikus about hockey, Dusk's being more about the violence seen in hockey whatsoever. But to Dawn and Dusk's surprises, their dad buys them tickets to the Montreal Canadiens ("Well, we both just about fainted!") from one of his clients who couldn't use the season tickets that night. Dusk then tells about his grandmother, Sophie "Oma" Rosenberg, who apparently farts all the time and enters every contest she sees. She mostly wields a walker and (for long distances) a wheelchair. Oma also curses most of the time in her language. She has a great desire for Elvis Presley, and still has a Velvet Elvis (Mrs. Rosenberg calls it "khalooscious") on the wall as a good luck charm, and throws a fit when it is taken down. Oma tends to be embarrassing to Dusk and Dawn, cursing and farting in front of her friends. Dusk wishes Oma would die sooner or late ARMANt the Molson Centre, the Rosenbergs' tickets are for section 203, which Dusk complains to. Mr. Rosenberg even brings a video camera, already having a bunch of video collections in their basement. They take the elevator to the 200 level. Oma's complaining of not being able to see ends up in Dusk and Oma switching seats. The Canadiens end up behind 4–0 in the first period, and worsening. The team loses 8–1, but afterwards, the lucky winner of the Million Dollar Goal Contest would be chosen, but through a JumboTron screen, which would sweep around and around to choose a section, and then would go in and out to choose a row. Section 203 (the section the Rosenbergs are sitting in) was chosen, and then Row L (the row the Rosenbergs are sitting in) was chosen, but the lucky winner was none other than a fast-asleep Oma.

Mrs. Rosenberg believes Oma cannot take the shot, thinking Oma might fall and break a hip. Even when Dawn points out all the things affordable to buy, Mr. Rosenberg still refuses to let his mother take the shot for "a cool new video game system." Dawn suggests that the shot would be made easier for Oma, in which Dusk agrees for once. Their dad instantly believes Oma was chosen because she was an old "cripple" who couldn't walk, so they wouldn't have to pay off the million dollars. Oma rolls in and asks where she left her teeth, but quickly finds them in her mouth. But, however, Oma says she isn't a cripple and would take the shot.

Dawn and Dusk end up having to train Oma for the big day, Oma to shoot goals on a layer of plastic ice, but Oma accidentally slips and falls, Dawn unable to grab her arm to prevent her. Oma is rushed to the hospital, but she never really broke anything. She however is reported to be a terrible hockey player, unable to make the NHL if she would fall taking just a slap shot. She refused to take painkillers, as that was what killed her role model, Elvis Presley. Oma has her walker taken away and must use a wheelchair on a daily basis, but she says she would still take the shot.

Oma must rest in bed for the next 2 days with no physical activity; Dawn and Dusk are afraid to try and retrain Oma after her first training. Mrs. Rosenberg tells them how people need something worth living for, an example being the achievement of Dawn and Dusk's other grandmother's wish to see the 21st century.

== See also ==
- The Million Dollar Shot, another book in the series, involving basketball.
- The Million Dollar Kick, another book in the series, involving soccer.
- The Million Dollar Putt, another book in the series, involving golf.
