= Honus Wagner =

American baseball player (1874–1955)

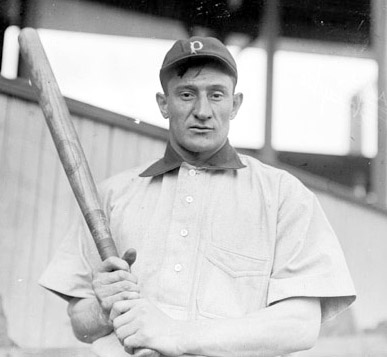
- Wagner in 1903
- Shortstop
- Born: February 24, 1874; Chartiers Borough, Pennsylvania, U.S.
- Died: December 6, 1955 (aged 81); Carnegie, Pennsylvania, U.S.
- Batted: Right Threw: Right

MLB debut
- July 19, 1897, for the Louisville Colonels

Last MLB appearance
- September 17, 1917, for the Pittsburgh Pirates

MLB statistics
- Batting average: .328
- Hits: 3,420
- Home runs: 101
- Runs batted in: 1,732
- Stolen bases: 723
- Stats at Baseball Reference

Teams
- As player: Louisville Colonels (1897–1899); Pittsburgh Pirates (1900–1917); As manager: Pittsburgh Pirates (1917); As coach: Pittsburgh Pirates (1933–1951)

Career highlights and awards
- World Series champion (1909); 8× NL batting champion (1900, 1903, 1904, 1906–1909, 1911); 4× NL RBI leader (1901, 1902, 1908, 1909); 5× NL stolen base leader (1901, 1902, 1904, 1907, 1908); Pittsburgh Pirates No. 33 retired; Pittsburgh Pirates Hall of Fame; Major League Baseball All-Century Team; Major League Baseball All-Time Team

Member of the National

Baseball Hall of Fame
- Induction: 1936
- Vote: 95.1% (first ballot)

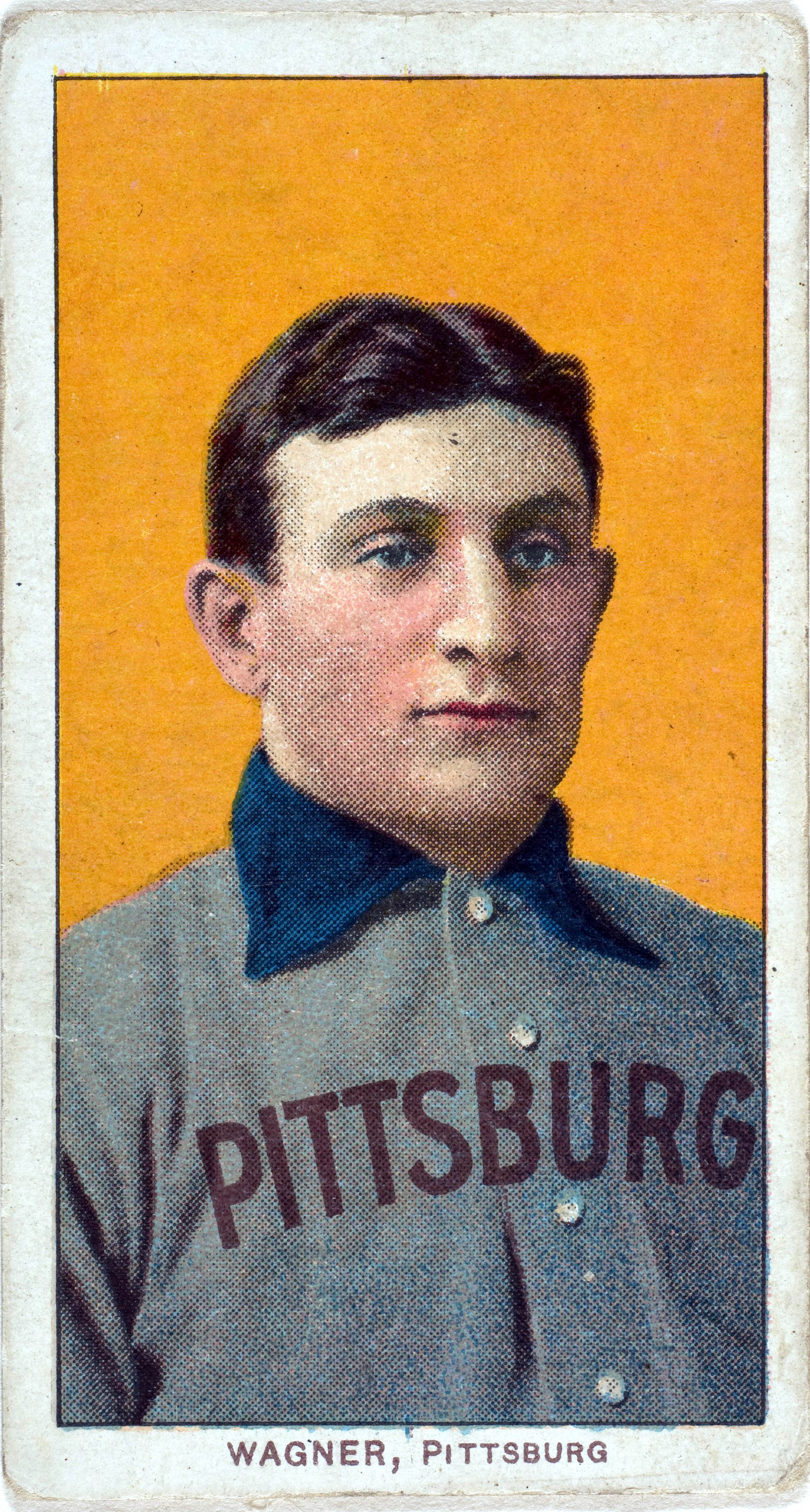
Honus Wagner card issued by the American Tobacco Company

Johannes Peter "Honus" Wagner (/ˈhɒnəs ˈwæɡnər/ HAW-nəs WAG-nər; February 24, 1874 – December 6, 1955) was an American professional baseball shortstop who played 21 seasons in Major League Baseball (MLB) from 1897 to 1917, mostly with the Pittsburgh Pirates. Nicknamed "the Flying Dutchman" due to his superb speed and German heritage, Wagner was a prototypical five-tool player, known for being a versatile defender who could combine a strong throwing arm with the ability to play almost any defensive position as well as being capable of hitting for average and for power. He is widely regarded as the greatest shortstop of all time. In 1936, the Baseball Hall of Fame inducted Wagner as one of the first five members.

At the age of 15, Wagner began his baseball career in the minor leagues in 1889. After being noticed by a talent scout, he made his MLB debut in 1897 with the Louisville Colonels. Wagner excelled at playing any position both in the infield and in the outfield, eventually becoming a regular shortstop by 1903. After the Colonels folded in 1899, club president Barney Dreyfuss bought the Pittsburgh Pirates and brought along Wagner with him, where he would spend the rest of his career. He quickly established himself as the National League's premier star. Wagner won a joint-record eight NL batting titles, led the league in slugging six times, stolen bases five times and RBIs four times. Wagner played at least ten career games at every position except pitcher and catcher. (Note: Wagner did appear in two games as a pitcher (once in 1900 and once in 1902). He threw 8 1/3 innings, gave up no earned runs, recorded six strikeouts, and finished with an earned run average of 0.00 and a win–loss record of 0–0.) With Pittsburgh, Wagner appeared in two World Series, including the inaugural 1903 World Series and 1909 World Series, the latter of which was the Pirates' first World Series title.

After a brief stint as player-manager, Wagner retired in 1917 having set numerous MLB career records, extra-base hits (996), most runs scored (1,739), most games played (2,794), most hits (3,420), most total bases (4,870), and most at-bats (10,439), all of which would be broken by Ty Cobb in the following decade. He also retained many other NL career records for decades, including most triples (252, still a league record), most stolen bases in the modern era (703) (Note: Prior to 1898, a player was credited with a stolen base if he took an extra base on another player's base hit. Wagner's stolen bases total (under modern rules) is 703, 20 fewer than his overall career mark of 723.) until 1927, most runs scored until 1944, most doubles (640) until 1958, and most hits until 1962. Wagner still ranks in the top 10 for hits, doubles, triples, stolen bases, and WAR among all major league players; and among National League record holders, he maintains his ranking in the top 10 players for games played, at-bats, runs scored, runs batted in, and total bases.

Wagner remained involved with baseball after retirement, serving as a coach for the Pirates. During his tenure, he helped tutor future Hall of Famers Arky Vaughan and Ralph Kiner. He was widely praised by contemporary players and journalists alike for his playing ability.

Wagner is also the subject of the T206 Honus Wagner baseball card, one of the rarest baseball cards in existence. One specimen sold for $7.25 million, putting it on the list of most expensive sports cards.

== Early life ==
Johannes Peter "Honus" Wagner was born on February 24, 1874, to German immigrants Peter and Katheryn Wagner in the borough of Chartiers, in what is now Carnegie, Pennsylvania.

Wagner was one of nine children. As a child, he was called Hans by his mother, which later evolved into Honus. "Hans" was also an alternate nickname during his major league career. Wagner dropped out of school at age 12 to help his father and brothers in the coal mines. In their free time, he and his brothers played sandlot baseball and developed their skills to such an extent that three of his brothers went on to become professionals as well.

According to Wagner's own testimony, the name "Honus" (pronounced: "HAW-nus") was a shortened form of "Johannes", adopted by baseball teammates as a nickname.

Wagner's older brother, Albert "Butts" Wagner, who had a brief major league career himself, is often credited with getting Honus his first tryout. Butts persuaded his manager to take a look at his younger brother. Following his brother, Wagner trained to be a barber before becoming successful in baseball.

In 1916, Wagner married Bessie Baine Smith, and the couple had three daughters: Elva Katrina (b. 1918, stillborn), Betty Baine (1919–1992), and Virginia Mae (1922–1985).

== Professional career ==
=== Early career ===
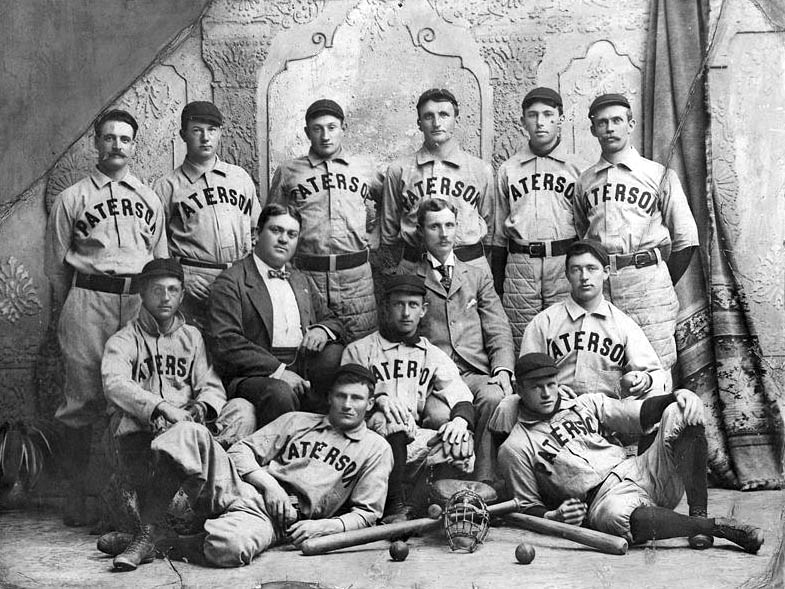
Wagner as a player on the Paterson Silk Sox team, 1897. He is third from left in the back row.

Honus's brother Albert "Butts" Wagner was considered the ballplayer of the family. Albert suggested Honus in 1895 when his Inter-State League team was in need of help. Wagner played for five teams in that first year, in three different leagues over the course of 80 games.

In 1896, Ed Barrow played with Wagner with the Wheeling Nailers, and decided to take him with him to his next team, the Paterson Silk Weavers (Atlantic League). Barrow proved to be a good talent scout, as Wagner could play wherever he was needed, including all three bases and the outfield. Wagner hit .313 for Paterson in 1896 and .375 in 74 games in 1897.

At shortstop there is only one candidate, the immortal Honus Wagner. He was just head and shoulders above anyone else in that position. Fellows like Marion, Bancroft, Peck and Billy Jurges were all great fielders. But Honus could more than out-field all of them. He was perhaps the greatest right-handed hitter of all time. He had remarkably long arms, hams for hands, and just drew the ball to him. Ed Barrow once told me he could have been as good in any position but he made his greatest name as shortstop. He led the National League seven times at bat and he was always up with the leaders when he was in his forties.

— Babe Ruth

=== Louisville Colonels (1897–1899) ===
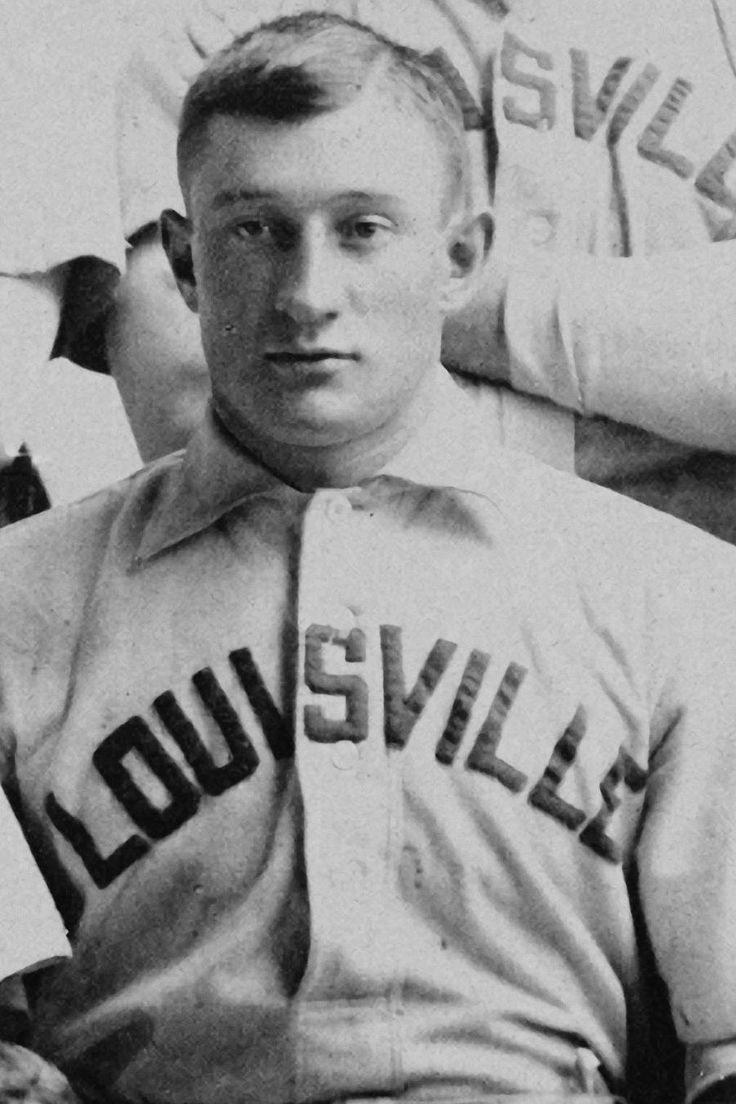
Wagner in 1897

Recognizing that Wagner should be playing at the highest level, Barrow contacted the Louisville Colonels, who had finished last in the National League in 1896 with a record of 38–93. They were doing better in 1897 when Barrow persuaded club president Barney Dreyfuss, club secretary Harry Pulliam, and outfielder-manager Fred Clarke to go to Paterson to see Wagner play. Dreyfuss and Clarke were not impressed with the awkward-looking man, not surprising, as Wagner was oddly built: he was 5 ft 11 in (1.80 m) tall, weighed 200 pounds (91 kg), and had a barrel chest, massive shoulders, heavily muscled arms, huge hands, and incredibly bowed legs that deprived him of any grace and several inches of height. Pulliam, though, persuaded Dreyfuss and Clarke to take a chance on him. Wagner debuted with Louisville on July 19 and hit .338 in 61 games.

By his second season, Wagner was already one of the best hitters in the National League although he came up short a percentage point from finishing the season at .300. Following the 1899 season, the NL contracted from twelve to eight teams, with the Colonels one of four teams eliminated. Owner Barney Dreyfuss, who had also purchased half ownership in the Pirates, arranged a trade that sent Wagner and many of Louisville's other top players to the Pittsburgh club.

Tommy Leach recounted his impressions of joining the Louisville club in 1898 with hopes of winning the starting job at third base:

I hardly had time to get settled before it hits me that this guy the Louisville club had at third base was practically doing the impossible. I'm sitting on the bench the first day I reported, and along about the third inning an opposing batter smacks a line drive down the third-base line that looked like at least a sure double. Well, this big Louisville third baseman jumped over after it like he was on steel springs, slapped it down with his bare hand, scrambled after it at least ten feet, and fired a bullet over to first base. The runner was out by two or three steps.

I'm sitting on the bench and my eyes are popping out. So I poked the guy sitting next to me, and asked him who the devil that big fellow was on third base.

"Why, that's Wagner," he says. "He's the best third baseman in the league."

And it also turned out that while Honus was the best third baseman in the league, he was also the best first baseman, the best second baseman, the best shortstop, and the best outfielder. That was in fielding. And since he led the league in batting eight times between 1900 and 1911, you know that he was the best hitter, too. As well as the best base runner.

— Tommy Leach, as told to Lawrence Ritter, The Glory of Their Times

=== Pittsburgh Pirates (1900–1917) ===
The move to the Pittsburgh Pirates signified Wagner's emergence as a premier hitter. In 1900, Wagner won his first batting championship with a .381 mark and also led the league in doubles (45), triples (22), and slugging percentage (.573), all of which were career highs. For the next nine seasons, Wagner's average did not fall below .330.

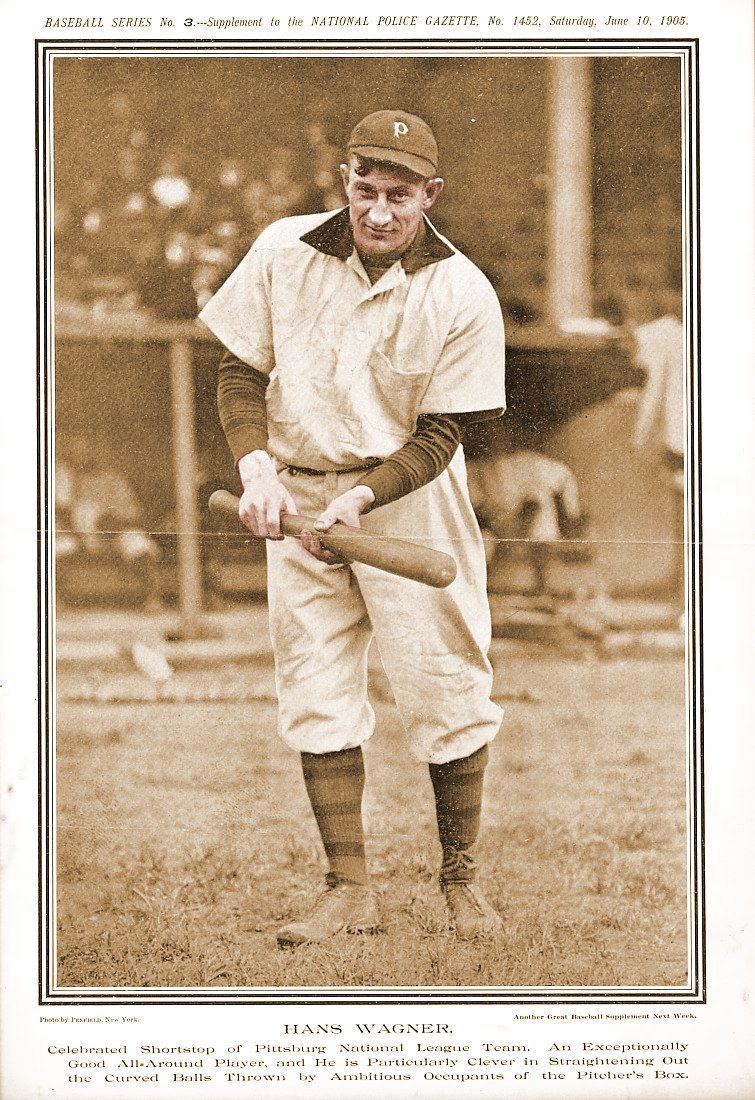
Honus Wagner in 1905

In 1901, the American League began to sign National League players, creating a bidding war, which depleted the league of many talented players. Wagner was offered a $20,000 contract by the Chicago White Sox, but turned it down and continued to play with the Pirates.

Prior to 1904, Wagner had played several positions but settled into the shortstop role full-time that season, where he became a skilled fielder. His biography on BaseballBiography.com describes his gritty style:

Bowlegged, barrel-chested, long-limbed ... he was often likened to an octopus. When he fielded grounders, his huge hands also collected large scoops of infield dirt, which accompanied his throws to first like the tail of a comet.

In 1898, Wagner won a distance contest in Louisville by throwing a baseball more than 403 feet (123 m). In August 1899, he became the first player credited with stealing second base, third, and home in succession under the new rule differentiating between advanced bases and stolen bases. He repeated the feat in 1902, 1907, and 1909. Wagner retired with the National League record for most steals of home (27), which was broken by Greasy Neale in 1922.

In September 1905, Wagner signed a contract to produce the first bat with a player's signature, the Louisville Slugger, becoming the first sportsperson to endorse a commercial product; the Honus Wagner was to become a best-seller for years. One month later, with one point separating him from Reds center fielder Cy Seymour for the batting title, Wagner fell short in a head-to-head matchup on the final day of the season, with Seymour collecting four hits to Wagner's two, as contemporary press reports stated that the fans were far more interested in the Seymour-Wagner battle than in the outcome of the games.

Shortly before the 1908 season, Wagner retired. In desperation, owner Barney Dreyfuss offered him $10,000 per year, making him the highest-paid Pirate for many years. He returned to the Pirates early in the 1908 season, and finished two home runs short of the league's Triple Crown, leading the league in hitting (for the sixth time)‚ hits‚ total bases‚ doubles‚ triples‚ RBI‚ and stolen bases. Wagner took over the batting lead from the New York Giants' flamboyant outfielder Mike Donlin during a July 25 game against the Giants and their star pitcher Christy Mathewson. Wagner was 5-for-5 in the game; after each hit, he reportedly held up another finger to Donlin, who went hitless, and who had just beaten runner-up Wagner by a wide margin in a "most popular player" poll.

Bill James cites Wagner's 1908 season as the greatest single season for any player in baseball history. He notes that the league ERA of 2.35 was the lowest of the dead-ball era and about half of the ERAs of modern baseball. Since Wagner hit .354 with 109 RBI in an environment when half as many runs were scored as today, he asks, "if you had a Gold Glove shortstop, like Wagner, who drove in 218 runs, what would he be worth?"

He was the first winner of The World's Championship Batsman's Cup, in 1908, made by Welshman George "Honey Boy" Evans.

=== 1903 and 1909 World Series ===
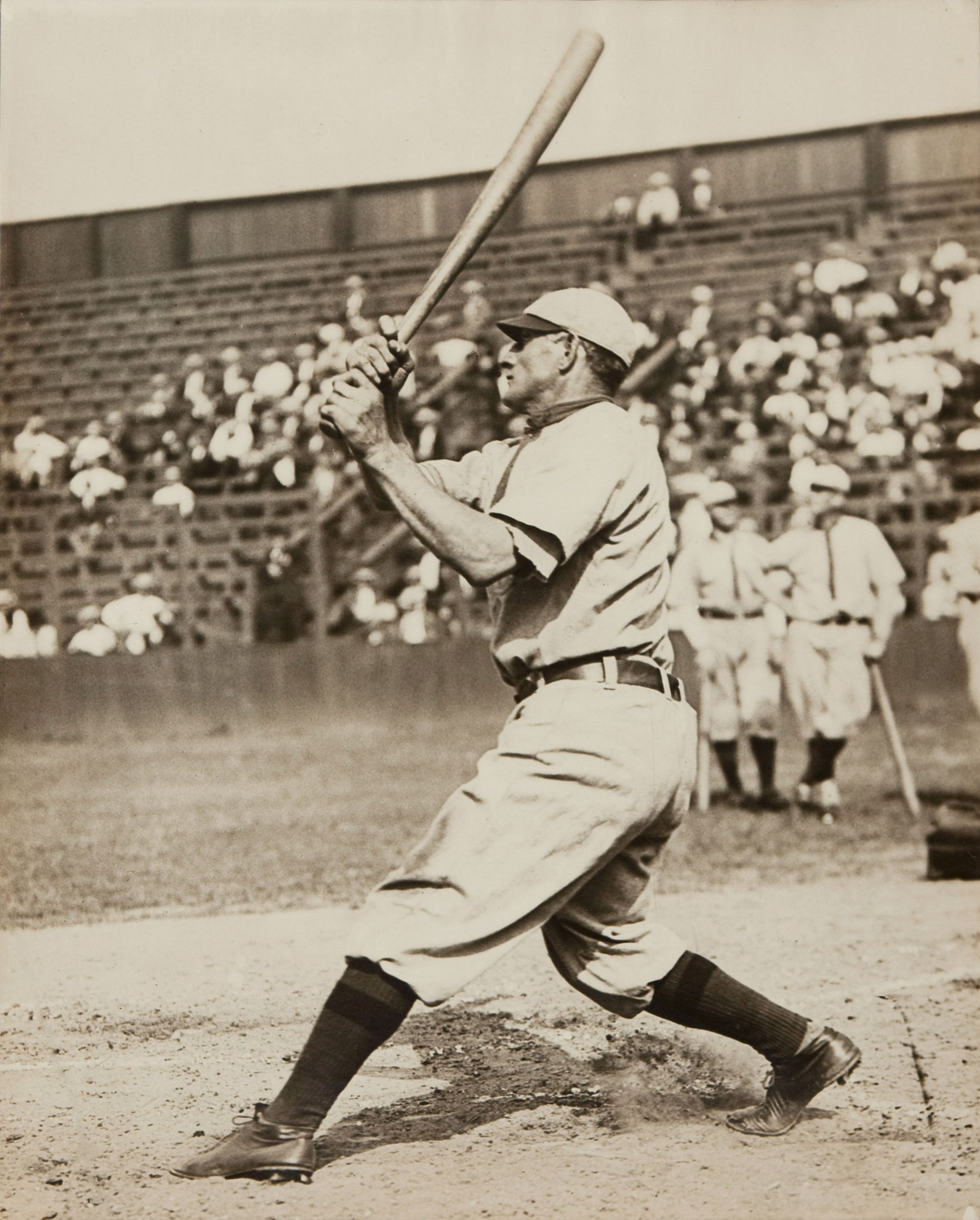
Wagner in 1910

In 1903, the Pirates played the Boston Americans in Major League Baseball's inaugural World Series. Wagner, by this point, was an established star and much was expected of him, especially since the Pirates' starting rotation was badly depleted by injury. Wagner himself was not at full strength and hit only .222 for the series. The Americans, meanwhile, had some fans, called the "Royal Rooters" who, whenever Wagner came to bat, sang "Honus, Honus, why do you hit so badly?" to the tune of "Tessie", a popular song of the day. The Rooters, led by Boston bartender Michael "Nuf Ced" McGreevy, even traveled to Pittsburgh to continue their heckling. Pittsburgh lost in the best-of-nine series, five games to three, to a team led by pitchers Cy Young and Bill Dinneen and third baseman–manager Jimmy Collins. Christy Mathewson, in his book "Pitching in a Pinch" wrote: "For some time after "Hans" Wagner's poor showing in the world's series of 1903 ... it was reported that he was "yellow" (poor in the clutch). This grieved the Dutchman deeply, for I don't know a ballplayer in either league who would assay less quit to the ton than Wagner ... This was the real tragedy in Wagner's career. Notwithstanding his stolid appearance, he is a sensitive player, and this has hurt him more than anything else in his life ever has."

Wagner was distraught by his performance. The following spring, he refused to send his portrait to a "Hall of Fame" for batting champions, citing his play in the World Series. "I was too bum last year", he wrote. "I was a joke in that Boston-Pittsburgh Series. What does it profit a man to hammer along and make a few hits when they are not needed only to fall down when it comes to a pinch? I would be ashamed to have my picture up now."

Wagner and the Pirates were given a chance to prove that they were not "yellow" in 1909. The Pirates faced Ty Cobb's Detroit Tigers. The series was the only meeting of the two superior batsmen of the day, and the first time that the batting champions of each league faced one another (this later occurred three more times, in 1931, 1954, and 2012 World Series). Wagner was by this time 35 years old, Cobb just 22.

This time, Wagner could not be stifled as he outhit Cobb, .333 to .231, and stole six bases, establishing the new Series record. The speed demon Cobb only managed two steals, one of which Cobb himself admitted was a botched call. Wagner recounted: "We had him out at second. We put up a squawk, but Silk O'Loughlin, the umpire, overruled it. We kept the squawk going for a minute or so, making no headway of course, and then Cobb spoke up. He turned to O'Loughlin, an American League umpire, by the way, and said, 'Of course I was out. They had me by a foot. You just booted the play, so come on, let's play ball.'"

There was also a story that was widely circulated over the years and famously recounted in Lawrence Ritter's The Glory of Their Times, that at one point Cobb was on first; he bragged to Wagner that he was going to steal second and threatened to assault him physically doing it; Wagner defiantly dared him to try it and placed an especially rough tag to Cobb's mouth; and the two exchanged choice words. Cobb denied it in his autobiography, and the play-by-play of the 1909 World Series confirms that the event could not have happened as stated: Cobb was never tagged out by Wagner in a caught-stealing. The Pirates won the series in seven games behind the pitching of rookie Babe Adams.

=== Later career ===
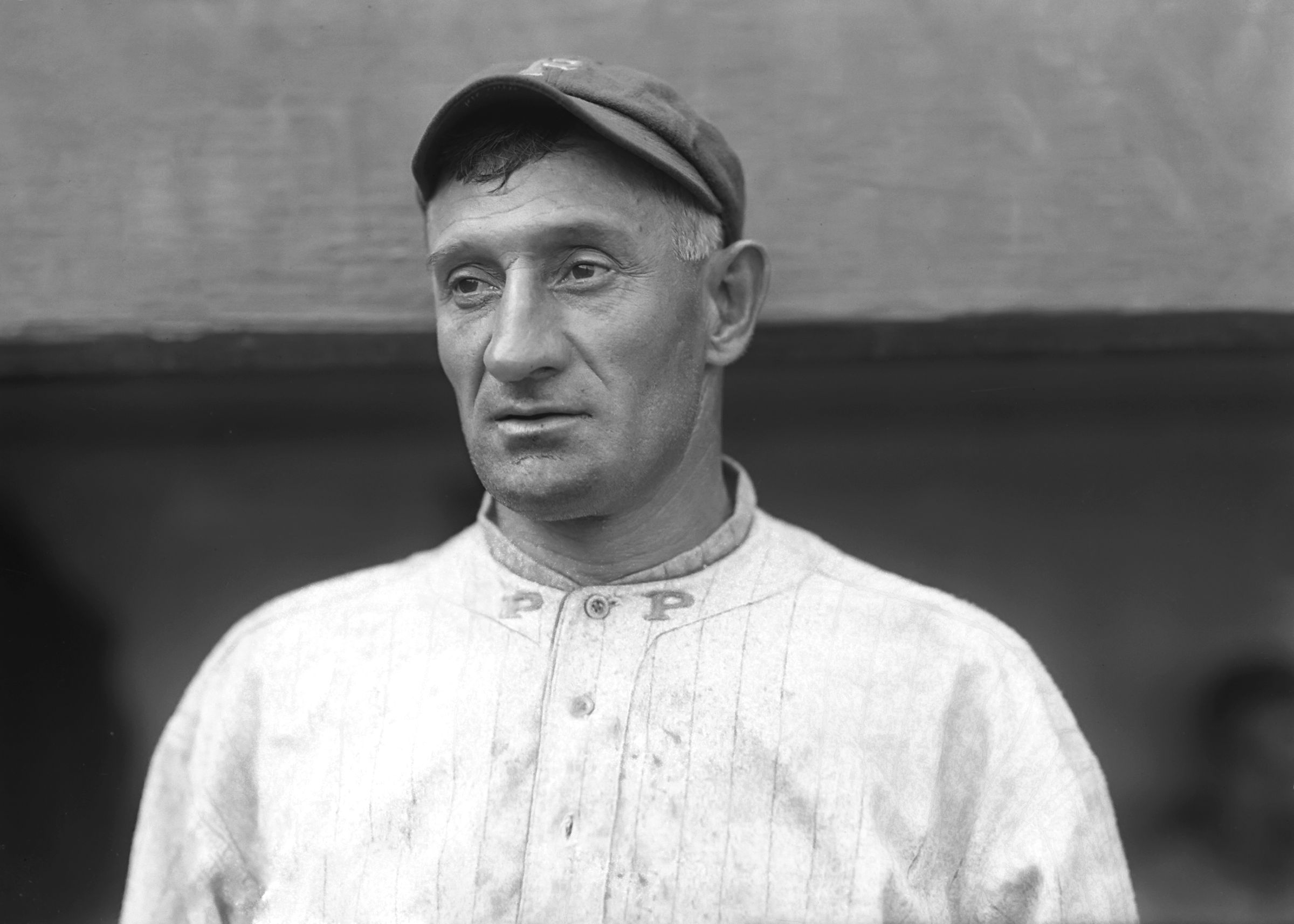
Wagner in 1914

In 1910, Wagner's average fell to .320, his lowest average since 1898. Nevertheless, he aged exceptionally well; the three highest OPS+ seasons by any shortstop aged 35 or older belong to Wagner, and even his age-41 season ranks eighth on the list.

Wagner won the 1911 batting title by the narrowest of margins. He went hitless in a 1–0 win against the Cubs on May 30, but a successful league protest by the Cubs wiped out the result (and Wagner's at-bats). Wagner ended up edging the Boston Rustlers' Doc Miller, .334 to .333. The Pirates were in contention into August, but an ankle injury sidelined Wagner for 25 games and the team slid from the race.

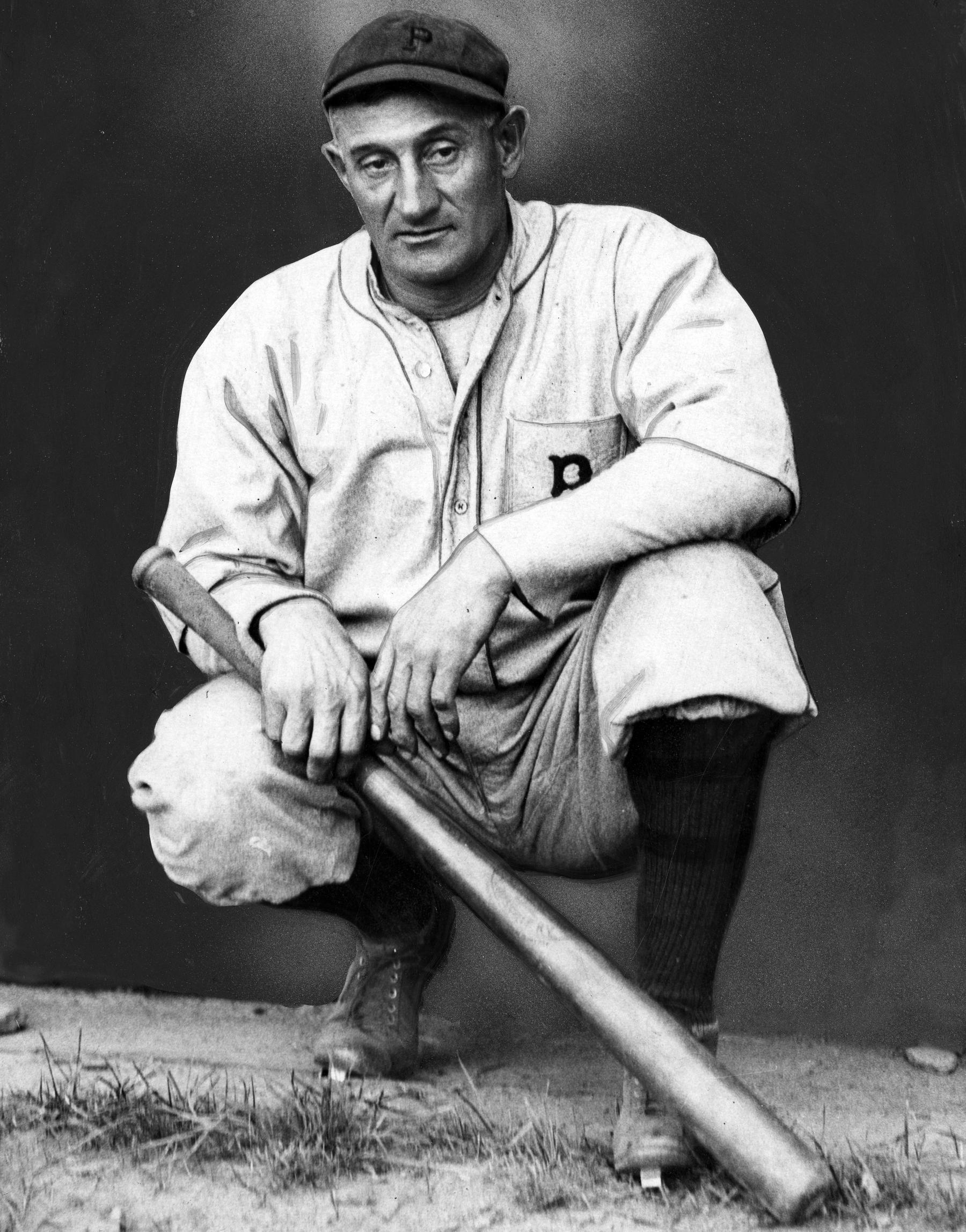
Wagner in 1915

On June 28, 1914, at age 40, Wagner recorded his 3,000th hit, a single off rookie Cincinnati Reds pitcher Pete Schneider, the second player in baseball history to reach the figure after Cap Anson. Nap Lajoie would join them three months later in the season. This accomplishment, however, came during a down period for Wagner and Pirates. Wagner hit only .252 in 1914, the lowest average of his career. In July 1915, he became the oldest player to hit a grand slam, a record which stood for 70 years until topped by 43-year-old Tony Pérez. In 1916, Wagner became the oldest player to hit an inside-the-park home run.

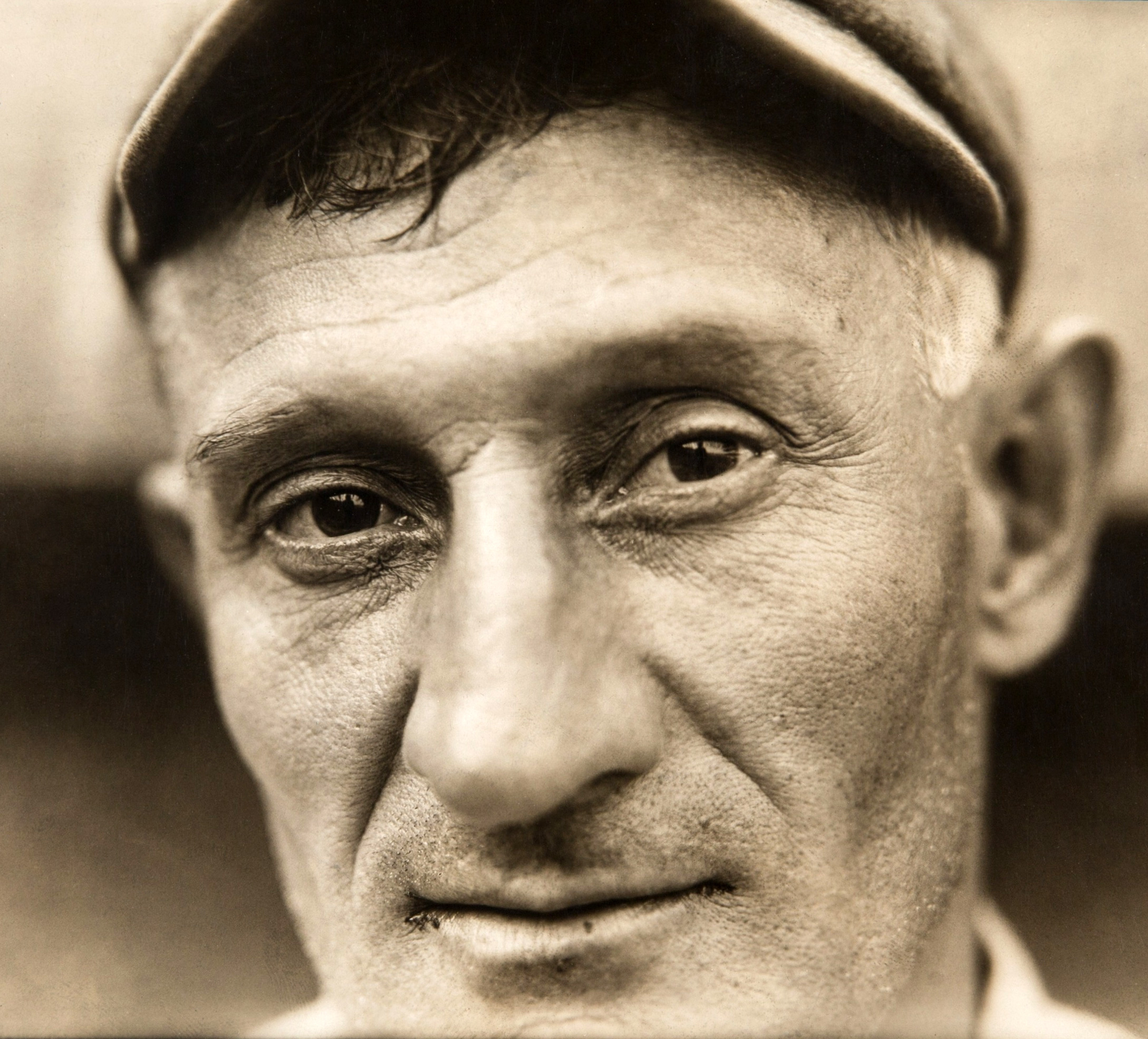
Wagner in 1916

In 1917, following another retirement, Wagner returned for his final, abbreviated season. Returning in June, he was spiked in July and played only sparingly for the remainder of the year, batting .265. He briefly held the role of interim manager, but after going 1–4, Wagner told owner Dreyfuss the job was not for him. He retired as the NL's all-time hit leader, with 3,430. (Subsequent research has since revised this total to 3,418.) It took 45 years for St. Louis' Stan Musial to surpass Wagner's hit total.

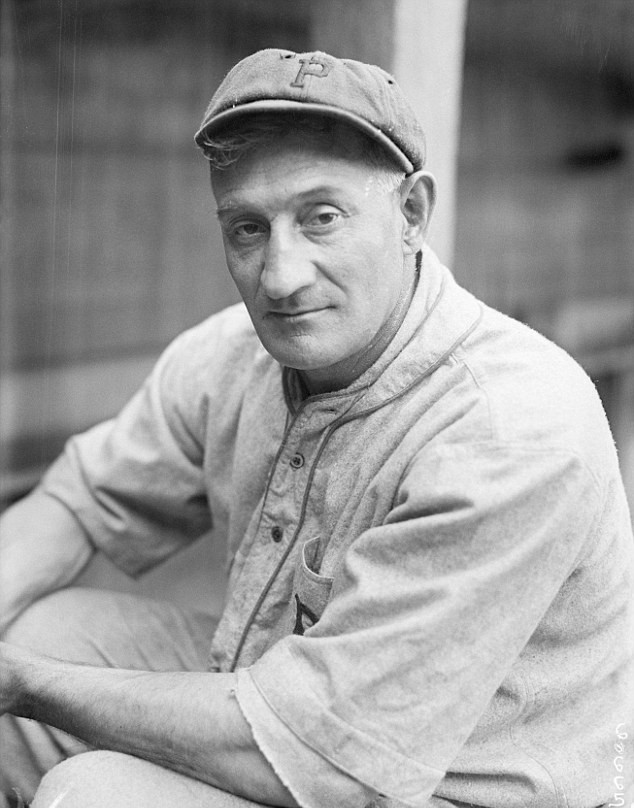
Wagner in 1917

Wagner has been considered one of the very best all-around players to ever play baseball since the day he retired in 1917. Baseball historian and statistician Bill James named Honus Wagner as the second-best player of all time after Babe Ruth, rating him as the best major league player in 1900 and each year from 1902 to 1908. Statisticians John Thorn and Pete Palmer rate Wagner as ninth all-time in their "Total Player Ranking". Many of the greats who played or managed against Wagner, including Babe Ruth, Ty Cobb, Rogers Hornsby, and Walter Johnson, list him at shortstop on their All-Time teams.

=== Life after baseball ===
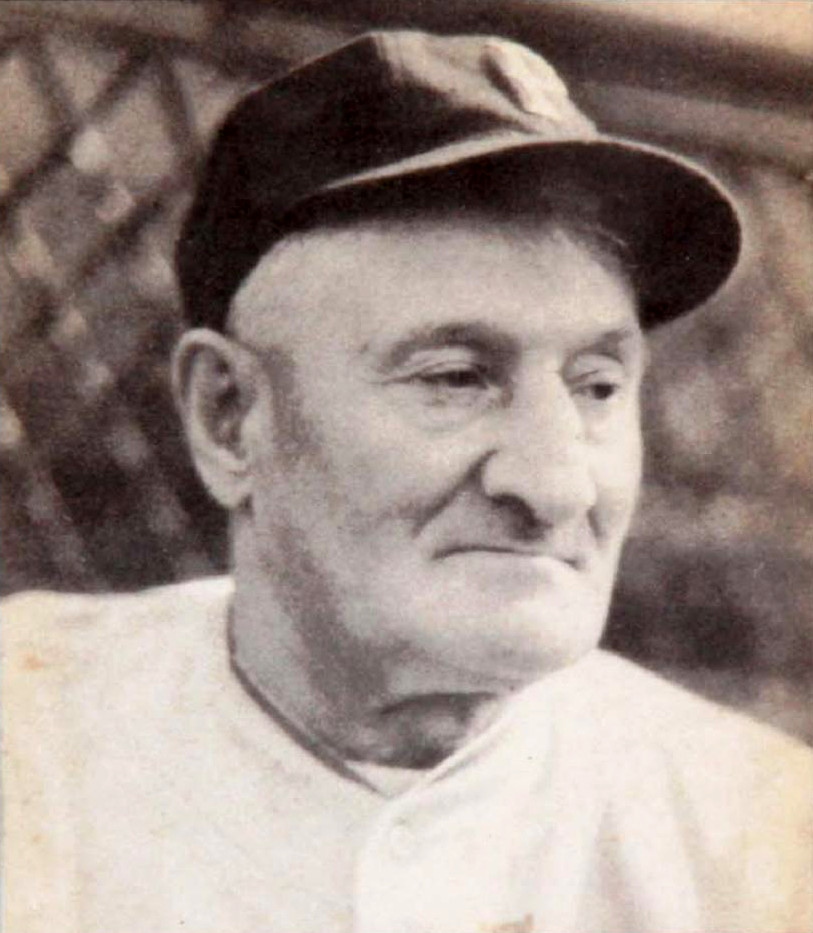
Wagner as a Pirates coach, c. 1940

Wagner was not finished playing baseball after his retirement from major league baseball. He managed and played for a semi-pro team. After retirement, Wagner served the Pirates as a coach for 39 years, most notably as a hitting instructor from 1933 to 1952. Arky Vaughan, Ralph Kiner, Pie Traynor (player-manager from 1934–1939), and Hank Greenberg (although Greenberg was in his final major league season in 1947, his only season with the Pirates, and very well established) all future Hall of Famers, were notable "pupils" of Wagner. During this time, he wore uniform number 14 but later changed it to his more famous 33, which was later the number retired for him. (His entire playing career was in the days before uniform numbers were worn.) His appearances at National League stadiums during his coaching years were always well received and Wagner remained a beloved ambassador of baseball. Wagner also coached baseball and basketball at Carnegie Institute of Technology, which is now part of Carnegie Mellon University.

In 1928, Wagner ran for the office of Sheriff of Allegheny County, Pennsylvania, but lost. He was appointed as a deputy of the Allegheny County Sheriff's Office in 1942. He also ran a well-known sporting goods company. A sporting goods store bearing the name "Honus Wagner" operated in downtown Pittsburgh for 93 years before closing permanently in 2011.

The Pirates hosted the 1944 Major League Baseball All-Star Game at Forbes Field. Wagner was invited to be an honorary coach for the National League squad, the first time this honor was bestowed in Major League Baseball's All-Star Game.

Wagner lived the remainder of his life in Pittsburgh, where he was well known as a friendly figure around town. He died on December 6, 1955, at the age of 81, and he is buried at Jefferson Memorial Cemetery in the South Hills area of Pittsburgh.

=== Film legacy ===
Wagner, along with his famous baseball card, was one of the earliest athletes to make the crossover into pop culture film. He starred as a sports hero in 1919's Spring Fever with Moe Howard and Shemp Howard of the Three Stooges, and has been depicted as the subject of The Winning Season (2004) and in a brief scene in Cobb (1994).

=== Baseball legacy ===
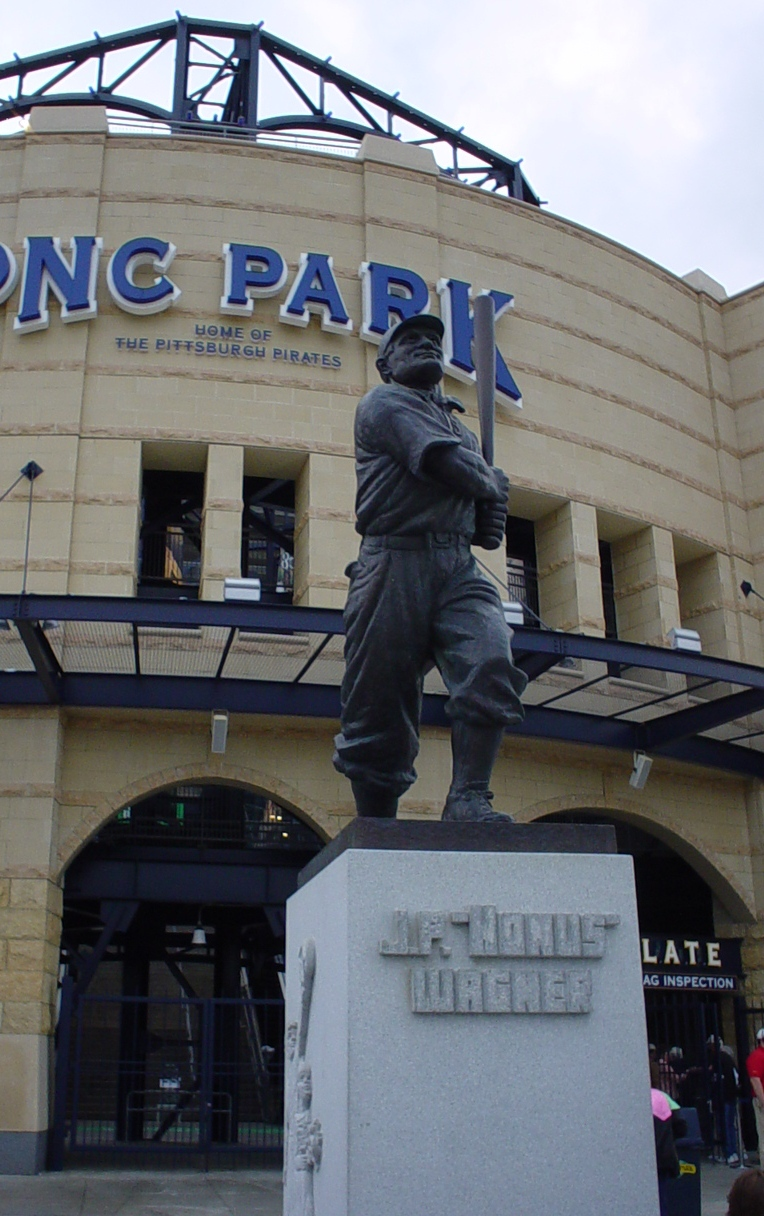
Frank Vittor's J. P. "Honus" Wagner statue at PNC Park

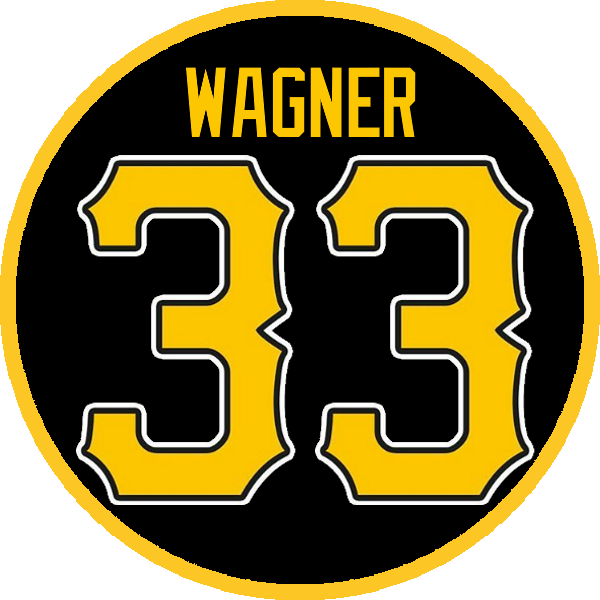
Honus Wagner's number 33 was retired by the Pittsburgh Pirates in 1956.

When the Baseball Hall of Fame held its first election in 1936, Wagner tied for second in the voting with Babe Ruth, trailing Cobb. A 1942 Sporting News poll of 100 former players and managers confirmed this opinion, with Wagner finishing 43 votes behind Cobb and six ahead of Ruth. In 1969, on the 100th anniversary of professional baseball, a vote was taken to honor the greatest players ever, and Wagner was selected as the all-time shortstop. In 1999, 82 years after his last game and 44 years since his death, Wagner was voted Number 13 on The Sporting News' list of the 100 Greatest Players, where he was again the highest-ranking shortstop. That same year, he was selected to the Major League Baseball All-Century Team by the oversight committee, after losing out in the popular vote to Cal Ripken Jr. and Ernie Banks.

Christy Mathewson asserted that Wagner was the only player he faced who did not have a weakness. Mathewson felt that the only way to keep Wagner from hitting was not to pitch to him.

"A stirring march and two-step", titled "Husky Hans", and "respectfully dedicated to Hans Wagner, Three-time Champion Batsman of The National League" was written by William J. Hartz in 1904.

Bill James says that Wagner is easily the greatest shortstop of all time, noting that the difference between Wagner and the second greatest shortstop, in James' estimation Arky Vaughan, is roughly the same as the gulf between Vaughan and the 20th greatest shortstop.

Wagner is mentioned in the poem Line-Up for Yesterday by Ogden Nash.

Line-Up for Yesterday

W is for Wagner,
The bowlegged beauty;
Short was closed to all traffic
With Honus on duty.

— Ogden Nash, Sport magazine (January 1949)

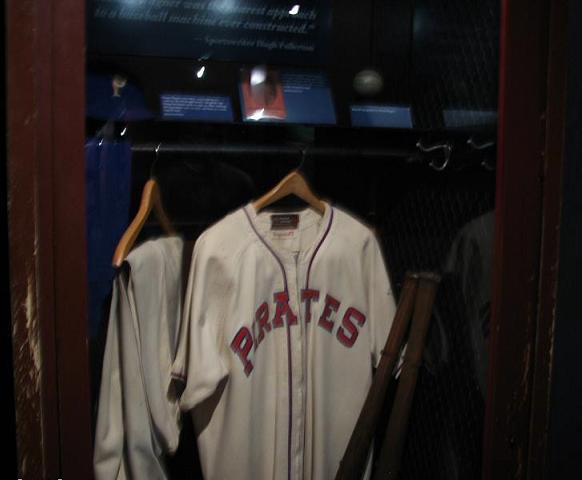
Honus Wagner's locker on display at the Hall of Fame

A life-size statue of Wagner swinging a bat, atop a marble pedestal featuring admiring children, was forged by a local sculptor named Frank Vittor, and placed outside the left-field corner gate at Forbes Field. It was dedicated on April 30, 1955, and the then-frail Wagner was well enough to attend and wave to his many fans. The Pirates have relocated twice since then, and the statue has come along with them. It now stands outside the main gate of PNC Park. The statue roughly faces the site of the Pirates' original home, Exposition Park, so in a sense, Wagner has come full circle.

Wagner is honored in the form of a small stadium residing behind Carnegie Elementary School on Washington Avenue in Carnegie, Pennsylvania. The stadium serves as the home field for Carlynton High School varsity sports. The Historical Society of Carnegie History Center houses the Honus Wagner Sports Museum which includes many Wagner collectibles and memorabilia. Visitors receive replicas of the famous card.

In the 1992 episode "Homer at the Bat", the popular TV show The Simpsons made a reference to Wagner. The character Mr. Burns lists three ringers he wants for his company's baseball team, but they are Honus Wagner, Cap Anson, and "Mordecai 'Three Fingers' Brown". His assistant has to point out that they are not only retired but long-dead ... Anson having played in the late 19th century.

In 2000, Wagner was honored with a U.S. postage stamp. The stamp was issued as part of a "Legends of Baseball" series that honored 20 all-time greats in conjunction with MLB's All-Century team.

== Statistics ==
The numbers shown below are the figures officially recognized on MLB.com.

G	AB	R	H	2B	3B	HR	RBI	SB	CS	BB	SO	AVG	OBP	SLG	OPS+	TB
2,792	10,430	1,736	3,430	640	252	101	1,732	722	15	963	327	.329	.392	.466	N/A	4,862

The figures on Baseball-Reference.com are as follows. Other private research sites may have different figures. Caught Stealing is not shown comprehensively for Wagner's MLB.com totals because the stat was not regularly captured until 1920. Strikeouts are not shown comprehensively for Wagner's MLB.com totals, because the stat was not regularly captured until 1910. Note that mlb.com's Total Bases do not correspond to the number of hits, 2B, 3B, and HR listed.

G	AB	R	H	2B	3B	HR	RBI	SB	CS	BB	SO	BA	OBP	SLG	OPS+	TB	SH	HBP
2,794	10,439	1,739	3,420	643	252	101	1,732	723	26	963	735	.328	.391	.467	151	4,870	221	125

== See also ==
- 3,000 hit club
- List of Major League Baseball career doubles leaders
- List of Major League Baseball career triples leaders
- List of Major League Baseball career runs scored leaders
- List of Major League Baseball career runs batted in leaders
- List of Major League Baseball doubles records
- List of Major League Baseball triples records
- List of Major League Baseball players to hit for the cycle
- List of Major League Baseball annual runs batted in leaders
- List of Major League Baseball batting champions
- List of Major League Baseball career stolen bases leaders
- List of Major League Baseball annual runs scored leaders
- List of Major League Baseball annual stolen base leaders
- List of Major League Baseball annual doubles leaders
- List of Major League Baseball annual triples leaders
- List of Major League Baseball player-managers
- Major League Baseball titles leaders

== Bibliography ==
- Hall of Fame Network: "Honus Wagner as Mona Lisa", HOFMAG.com.
- Honus Wagner: A Biography, by Dennis DeValeria and Jeanne Burke DeValeria, Henry Holt and Company, New York, 1995. ISBN 9781466862883
- Hittner, Arthur D. Honus Wagner: The Life of Baseball's "Flying Dutchman." Jefferson, North Carolina: McFarland, 1996 and 2003 (softcover). ISBN 9780786418114. Winner of the 1996 Seymour Medal, awarded by the Society for American Baseball Research.
- Honus and Me by Dan Gutman (novel), Perfection Learning Corporation, 1999. ISBN 9780780790216

Awards and achievements
Preceded by Bert Daniels	Hitting for the cycle August 22, 1912	Succeeded by Ed Lennox
