= Dan Gutman =

American children's writer

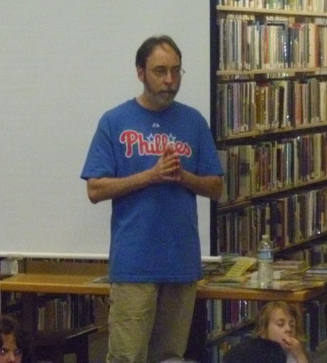
- Gutman speaking at a school in 2011
- Born: October 19, 1955 (age 70); New York City, U.S.
- Education: Rutgers University
- Occupation: Writer
- Spouse: Nina Wallace (m. 1983)
- Children: 2
- Writing career
- Genres: Children's historical fiction, historical, fantasy, humor
- Subjects: Video games, baseball history, sports biography
- Website: dangutman.com

Dan Gutman (born October 19, 1955) is an American writer, primarily of children's fiction.

His works include the Baseball Card Adventures children's book series that began with Honus & Me, The Genius Files series, and My Weird School series.

== Early life and education ==
Gutman was born in New York City, moving with his family a year later to Newark, New Jersey, where on June 1, 1968, his father abandoned the family. His homemaker mother Adeline became a secretary and cared for Dan and his older sister, Lucy. After Vailsburg High School in Newark, Gutman graduated from Rutgers University with a degree in psychology in 1977. He began a graduate program in psychology, but dropped out and moved to New York City in 1980 to pursue a writing career.

== Career ==
=== Video Games Player / Computer Games ===
After moving to New York City, Gutman worked as a magazine editor and columnist focused on computing. He founded and edited the magazine Video Games Player (renamed to Computer Games from its fourth issue until the end of its publication), which ran for 10 issues from 1982 to 1985. The magazine covered personal computer games, video game consoles, and arcade games, including news, company profiles, interviews, hints and tips, humor, and reviews. The magazine published an initial successful issue in 1982, and then began publishing bi-monthly. From issue 3, its managing editor was Shay Addams. Video Games Player was one of only a few magazines dedicated to the arcade and video game industry in the early 1980s, and played a role in shaping video game culture.

Gutman describes the magazine as "a little quickie thing that was put out by a small company"; the magazine did not attract significant success with circulation or advertising. Goodman changed the name to Computer Games after sales slowed and after sales failed to pick up he killed off the magazine. He later called his years editing the magazine as the only "real" job he ever had. He hired freelance illustrator Nina Wallace to draw for the magazine and the two married in 1983.

He said, "I started a magazine about video games and suddenly I was an expert in video games. I started writing about them and computers. All for grownups. It took me a long time to realize that writing for grownups was not my thing. It took me a long time to realize that what I was good at was writing for kids." His column appeared regularly in various computer-related magazines, such as Genie Livewire.

=== Works ===
Gutman has written over 70 books in the My Weird School series illustrated by Jim Paillot, plus related series including My Weird School Daze and My Weirder School. He has also written the Million Dollar series, featuring children who get a chance to win a million dollars in various sporting events; the Genius Files series; Tales from the Sandlot, a series of fantasy sports stories; and the Funny Boy series about an alien boy exiled to Earth. There have also been two about Judson Moon, who became President of the United States at 12; two about Qwerty Stevens and his time machine; and two about children who use a machine to do their homework. His standalone novels include They Came from Center Field, about extraterrestrials who want to learn baseball, Johnny Hangtime, about a young movie stuntman, and Race for the Sky, a historical novel in diary form about the Wright brothers.

Gutman's Baseball Card Adventures series, illustrated by Steve Chorney, revolves around a child named Joe Stoshack who travels back in time to meet baseball legends. The first work is based on the premise of his finding a Honus Wagner T206 baseball card in the attic of his neighbor. Further books in the series feature Jackie Robinson, Babe Ruth, Shoeless Joe Jackson, Dorothy Maguire, Abner Doubleday, Satchel Paige, Jim Thorpe, Ray Chapman, Roberto Clemente, Ted Williams, and Willie Mays. The original story, Honus & Me, was made into the Turner Network Television TV-movie The Winning Season, starring Matthew Modine and Kristin Davis.

Gutman's 1996 novel The Kid Who Ran for President was compared to the Donald Trump's 2016 presidential campaign by comedian John Oliver during an August 2016 segment of the show Last Week Tonight with John Oliver. As a result, the book jumped in sales.

Gutman wrote The Genius Files series. The 5-book series followed twins Coke and Pepsi (Pep) McDonald on a cross-country road trip to their aunt's wedding in Washington D.C. In book 3, You Only Die Twice, the family's RV explodes and for the remainder of the series the family drives in a Ferrari.

== Personal life ==
Gutman met his future wife, Nina Wallace, an illustrator, when she did freelance work for Computer Games. They married in 1983. They have lived in Haddonfield, New Jersey, and New York City, and have two children.

== Selected bibliography ==
Flashback Four Series (2016-2019)

- "The Lincoln Project" (2016)
- "The Titanic Mission" (2017)
- "The Pompeii Disaster" (2018)
- "The Hamilton-Burr Duel" (2019)

The Kid (1996-1999)

- The Kid Who Ran for President (1996)
- The Kid Who Became President (1999)

Baseball Card Adventures (1997–2015)

- Honus and Me (1997)

Million Dollar (1997-2006)

- The Million Dollar Shot (1997)
- The Million Dollar Kick (2001)
- The Million Dollar Goal (2003)
- The Million Dollar Strike (2004)
- The Million Dollar Putt (2006)

My Weird School (2004-2008)

My Weird School Daze (2008-2011)

My Weirder School (2011-2014)

My Weird School Special (2013–)

My Weirdest School (2015-2018)

My Weird School: I Can Read (2016-2018)

My Weird School Fast Facts (2016-2019)

My Weirder-est School (2019–2022)

My Weird School Graphic Novel (2021-2023)

My Weirdtastic School (2023–Present)

Qwerty Stevens Books (2002-2005)

- The Edison Mystery (2002)
- Stuck in Time with Benjamin Franklin (2005)

The Genius Files (2011-2015)

- The Genius Files: Mission Unstoppable
- The Genius Files: Never Say Genius
- The Genius Files: You Only Die Twice
- The Genius Files: From Texas with Love
- The Genius Files: License to Thrill
