= Frank Vittor =

20th-century sculptor

- Born: Frank Vittor; January 6, 1888; Mozzate, Como, Italy
- Died: January 24, 1968 (aged 80); Pittsburgh, Pennsylvania
- Education: Academy of Beres; Auguste Rodin
- Known for: Sculpture, Drawing
- Notable work: Statue of Christopher Columbus (Pittsburgh); Battle of Gettysburg half dollar Statue of Honus Wagner

Frank Vittor (Italian Name "Francesco Fabio Vittori") (January 6, 1888 – January 24, 1968) was an Italian-American sculptor, known for his "preference for the heroic and colossal".

== Early life ==
Vittor was born in Mozzate, Como, a suburb of Milan, Italy. He studied art in Milan at the Academy of Beres and then traveled to Paris, France to study under Auguste Rodin. When Vittor was 18 in 1906, U.S. architect Stanford White brought Vittor to New York City to work on his staff. White, who had designed Madison Square Garden II, was murdered at a performance at The Garden two weeks after Vittor arrived. The youth, having little money and knowing very limited English, decided to stay in America and soon opened an art studio. He met his future wife, Ade Mae Humphreys, a resident of Pittsburgh, and made the move to her home town.

== Major works ==
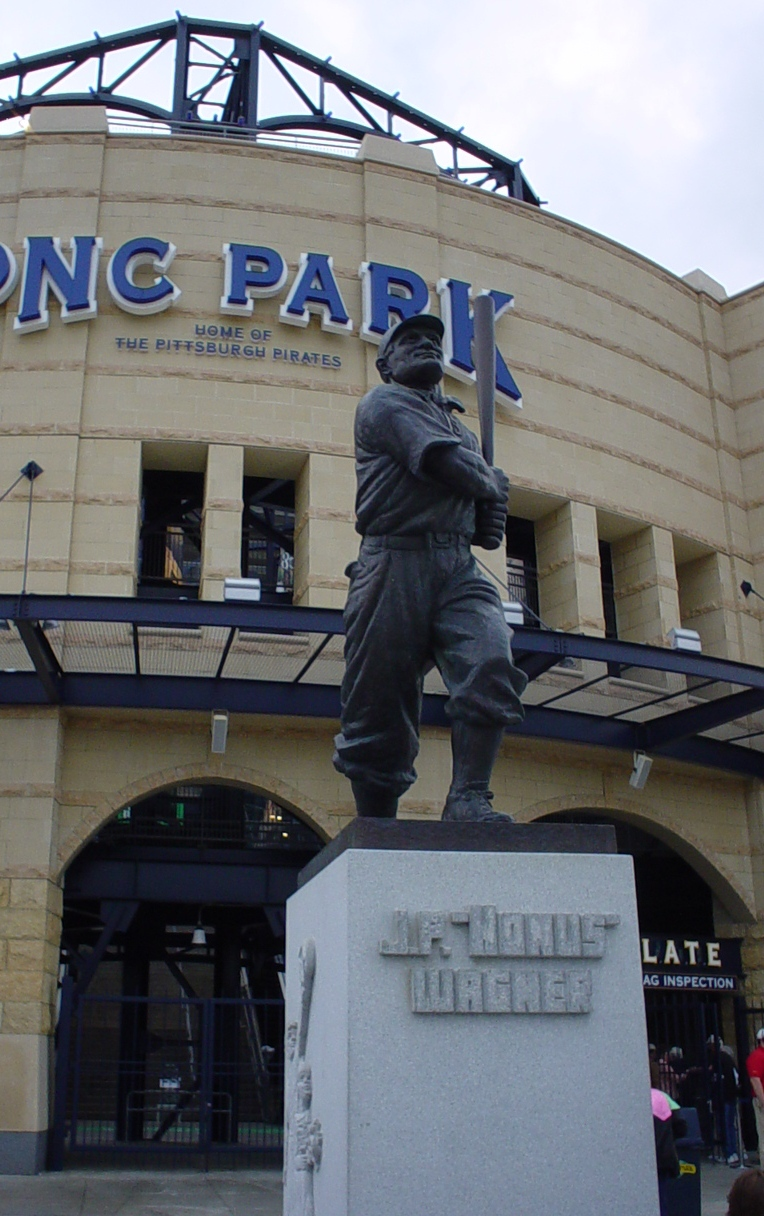
J. P. "Honus Wagner, Vittor's Honus Wagner statue at PNC Park

Aviator Charles Lindbergh’s first solo trans-Atlantic 3,600-mile (5,800 km) flight between Long Island, New York and Paris, France was immortalized in bronze by Vittor with a 50-foot-tall (15 m) sculpture showing a winged youth spanning the Statue of Liberty and the Eiffel Tower. Congress approved the expenditure in 1928, and the work was completed in 1929.

Perhaps no work by Vittor created as much controversy and media coverage as did his nude statue of Henrietta Leaver, Miss America 1935. Though Leaver posed for Vittor, she did so in a bathing suit, accompanied by her grandmother. Upon first viewing the lifesize 5-foot 5-inch plaster statue Leaver was shocked that it was a nude and demanded her representation be draped or veiled. Vittor did not agree and called in art experts to judge the work. All agreed it should stay as it had been created. Leaver did not back down and demanded people her own age review "The American Venus," as it had originally been called. Unfortunately for Leaver her 60 peers, many of whom were art students, agreed it should remain unveiled. Though the strong disagreement between the two eventually did subside, Leaver, Vittor and the statue resurfaced five decades later in recaps of controversial Miss America mishaps.

Baseball player Honus Wagner, one of the first five players inducted into the Hall of Fame, was memorialized by Vittor in a 17-foot-tall (5.2 m) bronze statue, originally on display near the Pittsburgh Pirates' Forbes Field. It was moved to Three Rivers Stadium and, when that stadium was imploded in 2001, the statue was relocated to PNC Park.

In 1958, one of Vittor’s greatest works, a 50-foot-tall (15 m) granite base and bronze statue of Christopher Columbus, was unveiled in Pittsburgh’s Schenley Park.

=== Commemorative works ===
Charles Lindbergh was the recipient of a second work of art created by Vittor. The artist and sculptor designed a commemorative stamp picturing the pilot and his plane, the Spirit of St. Louis.

Walter F. Brown, the U.S. Postmaster General, authorized a 175th anniversary commemorative "Battle of Braddock" 2-cent stamp to be designed by Vittor and issued on July 9, 1930, the anniversary of the battle. The artwork he created featured his statue of Colonel George Washington with the inscription "Battle of Braddock's Field, 1755–1930. The statue stands itself stands on the site of the battle, in North Braddock, PA.

Just downhill from the Washington statue, Vittor's "Winged Victory" stands in the courtyard of the Braddock Carnegie Library as a World War I war memorial.

In 1936 the U.S. Congress authorized minting a half-dollar coin to commemorate the 75th anniversary of the American Civil War. Vittor was the person selected to design the coin. The obverse depicts the profile of two soldiers, one from the North and one from the South, and the reverse holds a symbol of the battle placed between the combatant's shields. The coins were distributed through the Pennsylvania State Commission for Gettysburg.

== Presidents and more ==
Throughout Pittsburgh and the surrounding communities there exist more than 50 statues and fountains, as well as numerous other works, including a dozen historical panels on county bridges, and World War I memorials in at least five different cities. The artist sculpted numerous busts, including United States presidents Calvin Coolidge, Woodrow Wilson, Theodore Roosevelt, and Abraham Lincoln. Vittor also created a 10-foot (3.0 m) bronze statue of Thomas Jefferson, which is located at Jefferson Memorial Park.

For several years Vittor was an instructor of art and sculpture at the Carnegie Institute and the Carnegie Institute of Technology. The artist founded the Pittsburgh Society of Sculptors, and he also sat on the city’s planning commission. In 2008, Vittor was honored with a Pennsylvania State Historical Marker sponsored by the Heinz History Center which stands near his work of Columbus.

== Bibliography ==
- Ciotola, Nicholas P. (2010). From Honus to Columbus: The Life and Works of Frank Vittor. Italian Americans: Bridges to Italy, Bonds to America.
