= T213 =

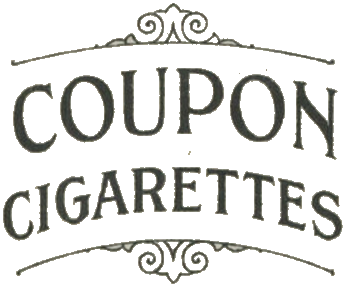
- Coupon Cigarettes logo/ad, as appeared on cards back
- Type: Baseball card
- Company: Coupon Cigarettes
- Country: United States
- Availability: 1910–1919

T213 was a baseball card set issued between 1910 and 1919 by tobacco manufacturer Coupon Cigarettes, based in New Orleans.

== Overview ==
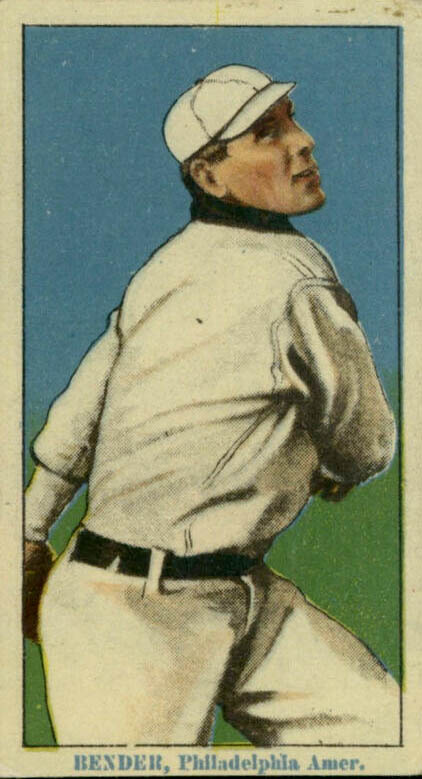
T213 Chief Bender card

T213 refers to the catalog designation assigned by Jefferson Burdick in his book The American Card Catalog. The series is also known by the name of the tobacco manufacturer whose advertisements appear on the backs of the cards, "Coupon Cigarettes." The T213 designation actually is used to refer to three different issues, differentiated as T213-1, T213-2 and T213-3.

The T213-1 (or Type 1) set consists of 68 cards. Using the images from the T206 set, the cards depict players from the National, American and Southern Leagues, with their names and teams at bottom. The cards measure 1-7/16" x 2-5/8", which is considered by many collectors to be the standard tobacco card size. Type 1 cards, produced in 1910 are most easily identified by the fact that the word "(MILD)" in parentheses is found between the words "Coupon" and "Cigarettes." Type 1 Cards are considered to be the rarest of the T213 issues and finding them in high grade is difficult due to the thin paper stock they were printed on.
