= T200 Fatima =

- Type: Baseball card
- Company: Liggett & Myers Co.
- Country: United States
- Availability: 1913–1913
- Features: MLB teams

T200, also known as Fatima Team Cards, were a type of cigarette card issued in 1913 by the Liggett & Myers Tobacco Company (L&M) through the Fatima cigarette brand. The set featured photos of professional baseball teams. The 'T200' designation comes from the American Card Catalogue, an authoritative guide to trading cards issued prior to 1951. (In other words, before the Topps company began to dominate the industry)

== Overview ==
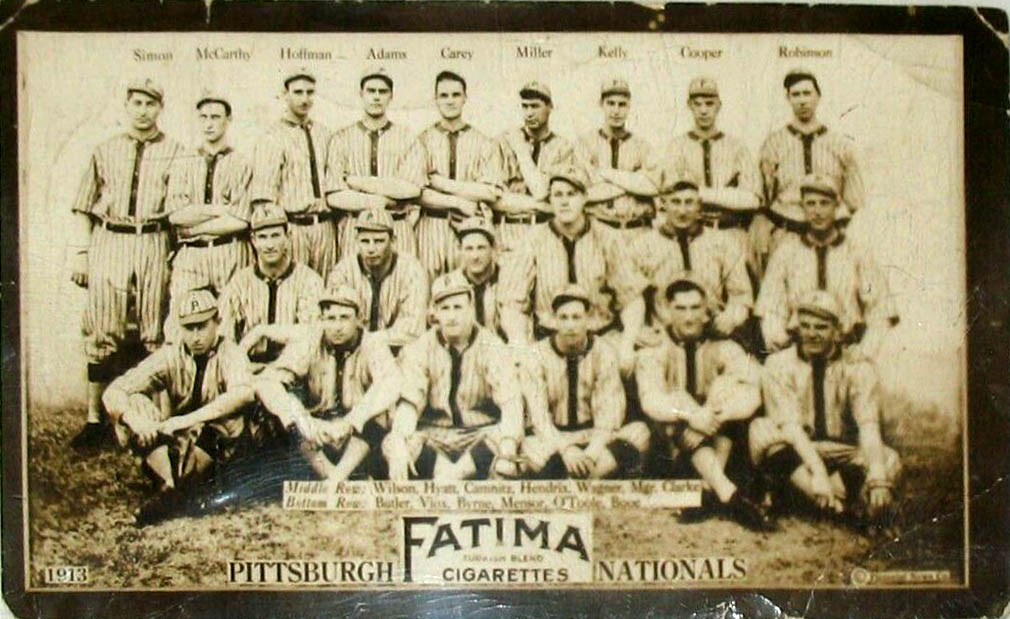
An example of T200 Fatima card featuring the Pittsburgh Nationals team

The set features a total of 16 cards measuring 2-5/8 inches x 4-3/4 inches. Each card featured a group photograph of Major League Baseball teams, with all of the 16 teams in the major leagues (American and National by then) included in the collection. The 369 players, managers and mascots pictured include 33 Hall of Famers inductees, such as Ty Cobb, Honus Wagner, Christy Mathewson, and Tris Speaker.

Unlike other tobacco card sets, T200 cards were printed on glossy paper. All of the players are identified by their last names. Back of the cards detailed how to obtain the larger-sized cards (measure 13" x 21"), referred by the collectors as "T200 Premiums". The standard/small cards were included inside Fatima cigarette tins while the larger versions were mailed to customers who had sent 40 Fatima coupons, with the team they chose. Those larger cards were identical to the smaller ones except they did not feature the Fatima advertising on their front, and the backs were blank.

Like other tobacco sets, such as the famous T205 and T206 issues, T200's were not numbered. Checklists generally list the cards alphabetically by the team.

== Checklist ==
Teams featured on the 16 cards included (card were not numbered):

=== American League ===
- Boston Red Sox
- Chicago White Sox
- Cleveland Guardians
- Detroit Tigers
- New York Yankees
- Philadelphia Athletics
- St. Louis Browns
- Washington Senators

=== National League ===
- Boston Braves
- Brooklyn Dodgers
- Chicago Cubs
- Cincinnati Reds
- New York Mets
- Philadelphia Phillies
- Pittsburgh Pirates
- St. Louis Cardinals
