= T201 =

Trading cards found with tobacco cigarettes

- Mecca Cigarettes logo and slogan displayed on cards back
- Type: Illustrated baseball card
- Invented by: American Tobacco Company
- Company: American Tobacco Company
- Country: United States
- Availability: 1911–1911

T201s, also known as Mecca Double Folders, were a type of cigarette card issued in 1911 by the Mecca Cigarette Company, then part of the American Tobacco Company. The collection featured color drawings of professional baseball players. The T201 designation comes from the American Card Catalogue, an authoritative guide to trading cards issued prior to 1951. (In other words, before the Topps company began to dominate the industry).

The set consisted of a total of 50 cards measuring 2 3/16 by 4 3/4 inches (5.6 cm × 12.1 cm). The 100 players pictured include a number of Hall of Famers, such as Ty Cobb, Christy Mathewson, and Tris Speaker.

== Overview ==
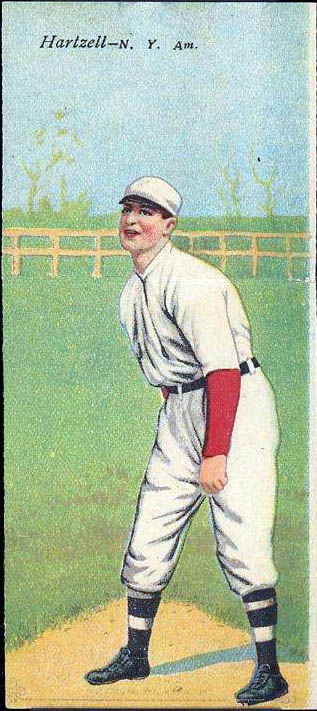
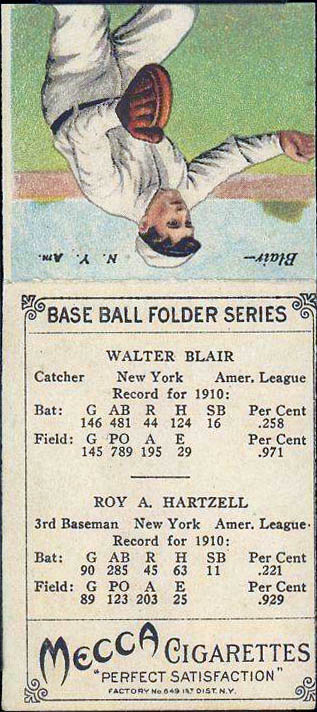
Example of front and back T201 card, featuring players Hartzell and Blair of the NY Yankees

T201s were called Double Folders because of their innovative design. Each card featured two players, one in a full picture on the front and one on half of the back. The other half of the back featured player statistics (one of the first baseball trading cards to do so) and an ad for Mecca. The cards were designed so that, when they were folded appropriately, the player on the back would appear on the legs of the picture on the front. Topps borrowed this idea in designing its 1955 Doubleheaders set.

The name Mecca chosen for the cigarette brand was related to an increasing demand for Turkish tobacco at the beginning of the 20th century, so Arabic names helped increase sales (Hassan or Fatima were other brands used by the company by then).

Like other tobacco sets, such as the famous T205 and T206 issues, T201s were not numbered. Checklists generally list the cards alphabetically by the last name of the player pictured on the front of the card. Card pairs generally combined teammates, most of them Hall of Famers.

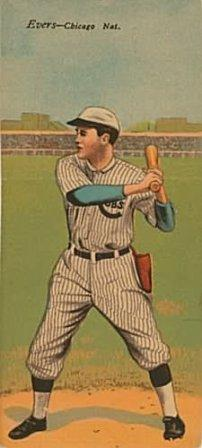
T201 Johnny Evers

== See also ==
Cigarette cards
