= T206 Honus Wagner =

Baseball card issued 1909–1911

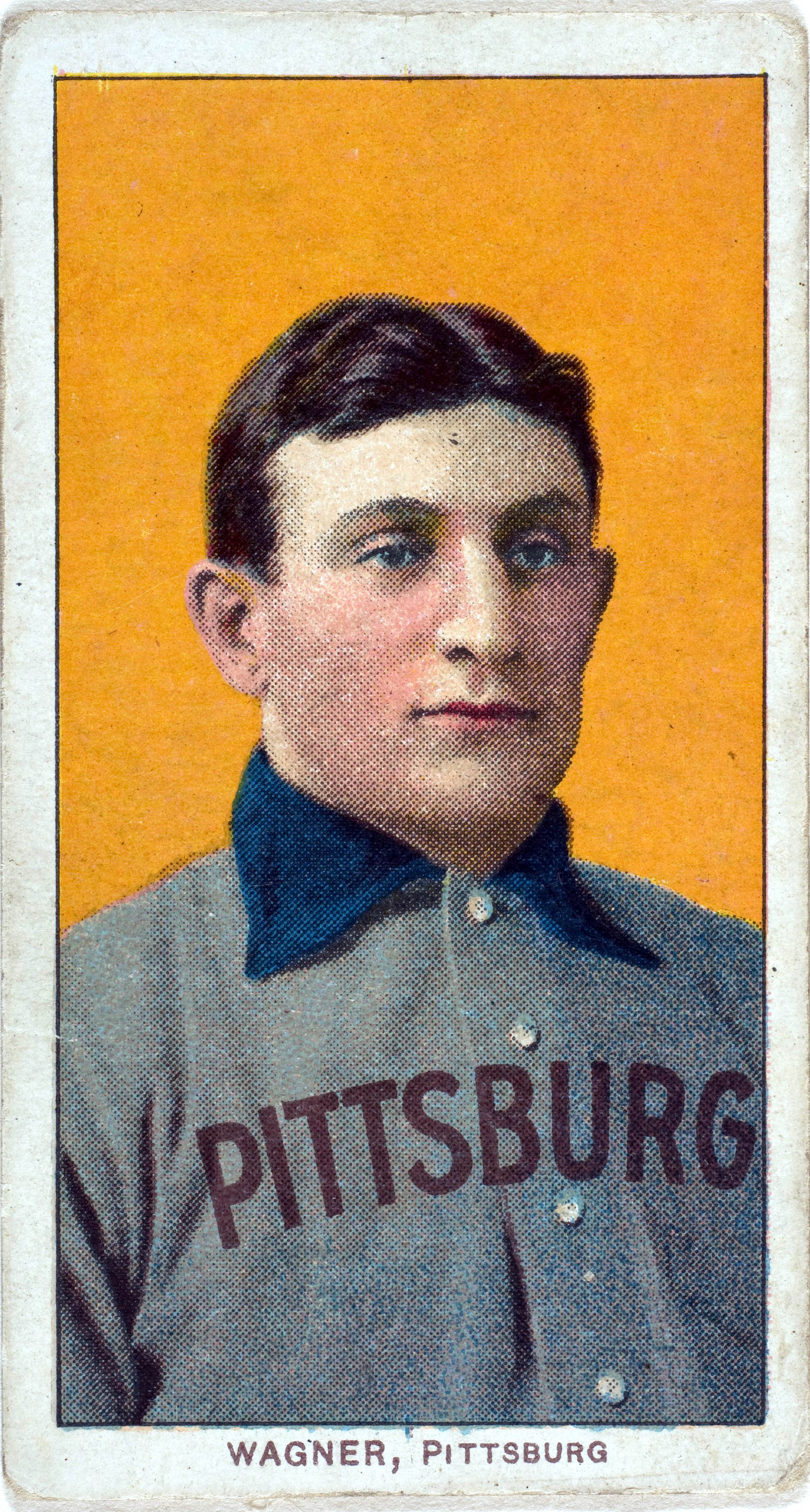
- T206 Honus Wagner card, from the Jefferson Burdick collection
- Type: Baseball card
- Company: American Tobacco
- Country: United States
- Availability: 1909–1911
- Features: Honus Wagner

The T206 Honus Wagner baseball card depicts the Pittsburgh Pirates' Honus Wagner, known as "The Flying Dutchman", a dead-ball era baseball player who is widely considered to be one of the best players of all time. The card was designed and issued by the American Tobacco Company (ATC) from 1909 to 1911 as part of its T206 series. Wagner refused to allow production of his baseball card to continue. While Wagner was a tobacco user himself, he may have objected to the card's inclusion with tobacco products due to a personal objection to tobacco, though this objection is disputed. The ATC ended production of the Wagner card, and a total of only approximately 50 to 200 cards were ever distributed to the public; the exact number is unknown. In 1933, the card was first listed at a price value of $50 in Jefferson Burdick's The American Card Catalog (equivalent to $1,200 in 2025), making it the most expensive baseball card at the time.

The most famous T206 Honus Wagner is the "Gretzky T206 Honus Wagner" card, so-called because at one point it was owned by Wayne Gretzky. The card's odd texture and shape led to speculation that it was altered. The Gretzky T206 Wagner was first sold by Alan Ray to baseball memorabilia collector Bill Mastro, who sold the card two years later to Jim Copeland for nearly four times the price he had originally paid. Copeland's sizable transaction revitalized interest in the sports memorabilia collection market. In 1991, Copeland sold the card to ice hockey figures Wayne Gretzky and Bruce McNall for $451,000. Gretzky resold the card four years later to Walmart and Treat Entertainment for $500,000 for use as the top prize in a promotional contest. The next year, a Florida postal worker won the card and auctioned it at Christie's for $640,000 to collector Michael Gidwitz. In 2000, the card was sold via Robert Edward Auctions to card collector Brian Seigel for $1.27 million. In February 2007, Seigel sold the card privately to an anonymous collector for $2.35 million. Less than six months later, the card was sold to another anonymous collector for $2.8 million (equivalent to $4.35 million in 2025). In April 2011, that anonymous purchaser was revealed to be Ken Kendrick, owner of the Arizona Diamondbacks.

A different card, named the "Jumbo Wagner", was sold at auction again in 2016 for a record $3.12 million (equivalent to $4.19 million in 2025). These transactions have made the Wagner card, at times, the most valuable baseball card in history. However, this record was first broken when a Mike Trout 2009 Bowman Chrome Draft Prospects Superfractors series rookie card with a card count of 1 sold in August 2020 for a new record of $3.93 million (equivalent to $4.89 million in 2025), and pushed further back by a 1952 Topps Mickey Mantle card that sold for $5.2 million (equivalent to $8.57 million in 2025) in November 2020, until another T206 Wagner sold for $6.6 million (equivalent to $7.84 million in 2025) in August 2021, returning the T206 to the most expensive sports card — that is, until August 2022, when another 1952 Topps Mickey Mantle card sale increased the record to $12.6 million to become the most expensive sports card of any type in history. The record was broken again on August 23, 2025 when a 2007-08 Upper Deck Exquisite Collection dual logoman autographs of Kobe Bryant and Michael Jordan, serial numbered 1/1 (unique), sold for $12.9 million dollars.

In October 2013, Bill Mastro, CEO of Mastro Auctions (the owner of Robert Edward Auctions), pleaded guilty to mail fraud in U.S. District Court and later admitted to the court that he had trimmed the "Gretzky" Wagner card to sharply increase its value.

Other T206 Wagners, both legitimate and fake, have surfaced in recent years. Some of the real cards have fetched hundreds of thousands of dollars in auctions. One particular T206 Honus Wagner owned by John Cobb and Ray Edwards has attracted media controversy over its authenticity.

== Background ==
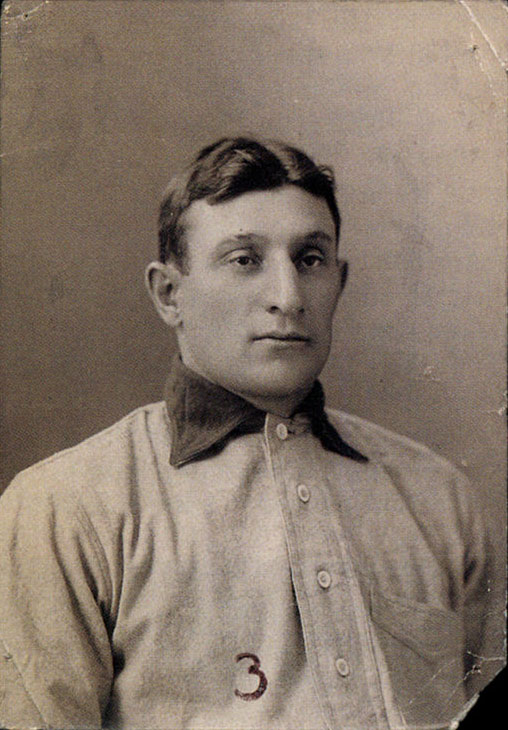
Cabinet photo by Carl Horner (c. 1902) used for the Wagner T206 card

The American Tobacco Company was formed as a result of an 1889 merger of five major cigarette manufacturers: W. Duke & Sons & Company, Allen & Ginter, Goodwin & Company, F. S. Kinney Company and William S. Kimball & Company. Because the company came to monopolize the tobacco industry, ATC did not have to conduct advertising or promotions for its products. Since baseball cards were primarily used as a sales promotion, ATC removed them from its tobacco packs, almost driving the cards into obsolescence. During the presidency of "trust-buster" Theodore Roosevelt, the ATC was subjected to legal action from the government, in hopes of shutting down the monopoly in the industry.

Thereafter, the ATC was back in competition with other tobacco companies, so it reinserted baseball cards into cigarette packs. In 1909, the company introduced the T206 series – also known as the "white border set" – of baseball cards of 524 players into its cigarette packs. The cards were printed at seven factories in New York, North Carolina, Ohio and Virginia. Two years later, the ATC was broken up into several major companies as part of the United States Supreme Court ruling in United States v. American Tobacco Company, 221 U.S. 106 (1911).

== Physical attributes and production ==
The typical card in the T206 series had a width of 1 7/16 inches (3.65 cm) and a height of 2 5/8 inches (6.67 cm). Some cards were awkwardly shaped or irregularly sized, which prompted a belief that many of the cards in the series had been altered at one point or another. In his work Inside T206: A Collector Guide to the Classic Baseball Card Set, Scot A. Reader wrote that "[i]t is not at all uncommon to find T206 examples that have been altered at some point during their near-century of existence." These discrepancies were taken advantage of by so-called "card doctors", who trimmed corners and dirty edges to improve the appearance of the card. The front of all T206 series cards, including the Wagner card, displayed a lithograph of the player created by a multi-stage printing process in which a number of colors were printed on top of each other to create a lithograph with the appropriate design. The backs of the cards featured the monochromatic colors of the 16 tobacco brands for which the cards were printed. The Wagner cards in particular advertised the Piedmont and Sweet Caporal brands of cigarettes and were produced at Factory 25 in Virginia, as indicated by the factory stamp imprinted on the back of the cards.

== Wagner's involvement ==
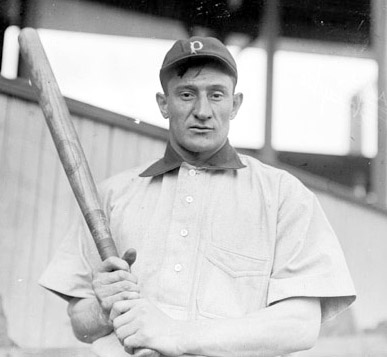
A 1903 photograph of Wagner taken by the Chicago Daily News

Starting from January 1909, the ATC sought authorization from baseball players for inclusion in the T206 series, which would feature 524 major league players, 76 of whom would later be inducted into the Baseball Hall of Fame. Wagner had been at the top of his game throughout the decade, and was even considered to be the game's greatest player at the time. He had appeared on advertisements for a number of other products such as chewing gum, gunpowder, and soft drinks. Unsurprisingly, the ATC asked for Wagner's permission to have his picture on a baseball card. According to an October 12, 1912, issue of The Sporting News, Wagner did not give his consent. In response to the authorization request letter sent by John Gruber, a Pittsburgh sportswriter hired by the ATC to seek Wagner's permission, Wagner wrote that he "did not care to have his picture in a package of cigarettes." He threatened to seek legal action against ATC if they went ahead and distributed his baseball card.

The reasons for Wagner's strong negative reaction to the ATC's request have been the subject of much speculation. The most commonly told account is that Wagner rejected the deal because he did not want young baseball fans to purchase the tobacco packs for his baseball card. Wagner held his fans in high regard, particularly the younger ones. His granddaughter, Blair, remarked that "[h]e loved children. He wanted to teach kids good sportsmanship. When it came time for that card to come out, it wasn't that he wasn't paid. He didn't want kids to have to buy tobacco to get his card." However, Wagner chewed tobacco, and he had previously appeared in advertisements for many tobacco products, including a cigar baseball trading card in 1899 and a newspaper ad for Murad cigarettes during the 1909 World Series.

Another explanation surmised is that Wagner did not consent because he felt he was not receiving just compensation from the ATC for his baseball card. Wagner had a history of being a tough negotiator; he had announced his retirement from baseball in December 1907, but returned shortly before the start of the 1908 season after receiving a $10,000 ($252,000 in 2025) contract, double his salary from the 1907 season. This theory has its flaws, however, since Wagner sent Gruber a check for $10 to compensate him for the fee ATC would have paid him if Wagner had given permission to create his baseball card. Michael O'Keeffe and Teri Thompson, authors of The Card: Collectors, Con Men, and the True Story of History's Most Desired Baseball Card, asked why Wagner would compensate Gruber for $10, a substantial amount of money at the time (equivalent to $346 in 2025), if he refused authorization for monetary reasons. The ATC had already produced a number of T206 Honus Wagner baseball cards; the exact number is unknown, but is speculated to be between 50 and 200. They stopped production of the card, however, after Wagner denied authorization.

== Gretzky T206 Wagner ==
In 1991, National Hockey League player Wayne Gretzky purchased a mint condition 1909 T206 Honus Wager baseball card, with a Piedmont cigarette brand back, at a Sotheby's auction. The card became known as the "Gretzky T206 Wagner" to the public. The Professional Sports Authenticator (PSA) company graded this card a PSA 8 Near Mint-Mint (NM-MT) on their 10-point scale, the highest grade given to any T206 Honus Wagner card. Bill Hughes, working for PSA at the time, was the official grader of the card. Hughes admitted to knowing that the card had been altered when he graded it.

The Gretzky T206 Wagner first came to attention in 1985, when small-time Hicksville, New York card collector Alan Ray contacted Bob Sevchuk, the owner of a Long Island sports memorabilia store, to arrange a potential $25,000 deal for his T206 Honus Wagner card. Bill Mastro, a sports memorabilia dealer who later founded Mastro Auctions and became one of the most powerful figures in the industry, heard the news, and immediately jumped on the offer. Mastro, with the financial backing of friend Rob Lifson, sought to improve the offer and had Ray add 50 to 75 of his other T206 series cards, including the rare T206 Eddie Plank, into the deal. Ray, who later stated he "had a money situation," agreed to Mastro's terms of the deal.

The circumstances regarding how Ray came into possession of the Gretzky T206 Wagner have been shrouded in mystery. He tried to avoid answering any questions regarding the matter but, in a 2001 interview, claimed to have received it from a relative, whose name he did not disclose. Inside the memorabilia community, there was speculation that the card had been cut from a printing sheet during the deal made with Mastro. Mastro has told colleagues in the memorabilia circuit that he purchased the card from a printer, which was not Ray's profession. Ray personally stated that Mastro might have been doing this to prevent others from trying to trace the card. Some also claim that Mastro bought the card from Sevchuk, not Ray.

After the transaction was completed, Mastro went back to his car and showed the Gretzky T206 Wagner to Lifson. Mastro offered one of the other T206 Wagner cards in his personal collection to Lifson as payment for the $25,000 that Lifson fronted him for the Gretzky T206 Wagner—claiming that Lifson could sell the lower-quality one for $30,000 and make a quick $5,000 profit. Lifson was skeptical, but he took Mastro's word and accepted the deal, successfully selling this other Wagner card to New Jersey businessman Barry Halper for $30,000. (Halper sold that card and 200 other baseball memorabilia items in 1998 to Major League Baseball for over $5 million.)

In 1987, Mastro sold the Gretzky T206 Wagner to Jim Copeland, a San Luis Obispo, California, sporting-goods chain owner, for $110,000. With that transaction, there was a sudden renewed interest in baseball card collecting. As Lifson commented, the Copeland deal revitalized the industry and "created an incentive to sell these great cards."

=== 1991 Copeland memorabilia auction ===
Within five years, Copeland decided it was time to sell his card collection; he chose to sell his entire 873-piece collection in a single sale, through Mastro. Mastro contacted Sotheby's, the renowned New York auction house, and asked them to accept the Copeland memorabilia collection on consignment. Sotheby's advertised Copeland's items as the "Copeland Collection of Important Baseball Cards and Sports Memorabilia" to attract hobbyists and other potential clients. The March 1991 auction attracted nearly 800 collectors who were interested in purchasing some of Copeland's rare memorabilia. The bidding prices far exceeded the pre-auction estimates, as a 1952 Topps Mickey Mantle card sold for $49,500, more than three times the initial pre-auction price estimate. Pre-auction estimates placed Copeland's T206 Honus Wagner at a price of $114,000. Within minutes of the opening bid for the T206 Wagner card, the highest bidder had put down $228,000, twice the pre-auction estimate. A bidding competition between Mike Gidwitz, Mark Friedland and an unknown phone bidder ensued. Gidwitz dropped out of the competition when the bidding reached the $300,000 mark. As Friedland made each bid, the phone bidder would counter with a bid $5,000 or $10,000 higher. Friedland dropped out of the competition after the phone bidder countered with a $410,000 bid for the card. With Sotheby's 10% buyer's premium, the final price of the card came out to $451,000 (equivalent to $1,066,000 in 2025), nearly four times the pre-auction estimate. The phone bidder was Wayne Gretzky, who purchased the card with advice and financial backing from his 'boss' Bruce McNall, the owner of the NHL's Los Angeles Kings. Copeland received around $5 million for the entire collection. The publicity coverage of the Sotheby's auction renewed interest in the hobby of sports memorabilia collecting. Mastro worked with Sotheby's for the next four years to facilitate sports memorabilia auctions and established himself as a leading card dealer in the industry. In 1993, illusionist David Copperfield used the popularity of the card as part of a magic trick which he performed during his TV Special The Magic of David Copperfield XV: Fires Of Passion. Copperfield had Gretzky sign the card, then proceeded to tear the card into four pieces, after which he restored it one piece at the time and magically removed the signature.

Gretzky, who was not a major card collector, said he purchased it because he thought "the market would remain strong," thus making for a valuable investment. McNall orchestrated the plan to buy the card. In a 2005 interview, McNall stated his "philosophy was, if you buy something that is absolutely the best in the world, you'd be okay because there is always another buyer for something at the top end."

=== Card back on the market ===
In 1995, Gretzky sold the card to Walmart and Treat Entertainment for $500,000 (equivalent to $1,056,000 in 2025). The two companies intended to use the card as the grand prize in a promotional contest. The card was sent all across the United States, as part of Walmart's plan to rejuvenate the baseball card market. On February 24, 1996 (the 122nd anniversary of Wagner's birthday), the grand prize drawing for the card was held on CNN's Larry King Weekend. At around 9:00 p.m., Hall of Fame third baseman Brooks Robinson, one of King's guests on the show, pulled out the name of one Patricia Gibbs, a postal worker living in Hollywood, Florida. After spending hours unsuccessfully trying to contact Gibbs, King's staff finally got through to her phone, and informed Gibbs of her prize. Treat Entertainment and Walmart gave the card to Gibbs a few weeks later at a Walmart store in Miramar, Florida. Gibbs could not afford the taxes on the card, so she decided to consign the card to an auction later on. She consigned the card to Christie's, a New York-based auction house better known for selling famous artworks.

Michael Gidwitz, the same individual who battled with Gretzky and Mark Friedland for the card at the Copeland auction in 1991, won the Christie's auction with a bid of $641,500 in 1996 (equivalent to $1,317,000 in 2025). Four years later, on July 5, 2000, Gidwitz partnered with eBay and Robert Edwards Auctions to start a 10-day online auction for the card. Robert Edwards Auctions, a division of MastroNet, set up a registration system in which they approved prospective individuals before they actually made bids. These individuals had to wire a $100,000 deposit to iEscrow.com in order to be pre-approved to make bids for the card. On July 15, the card was sold to Brian Seigel, a collector from California, for $1.265 million (equivalent to $2.36 million in 2025). In February 2007, the Associated Press announced that Seigel had sold the card privately and directly to an anonymous collector from Southern California for $2.35 million (equivalent to $3.65 million in 2025). Less than six months later, on September 6, 2007, SCP Auctions announced that the card had been sold once again to another anonymous collector for $2.8 million (equivalent to $4.35 million in 2025). The anonymous collector was later revealed to be Arizona Diamondbacks owner Ken Kendrick.

=== Alteration ===
Shortly after Gretzky's 1991 purchase, previously ignored allegations that the card had once been subject to alteration flared up again. This is when Gretzky approached Professional Sports Authenticator (PSA) to grade the card, resulting in the aforementioned PSA 8 NM-MT grading. Despite PSA company president David Hall's personal statement that the card was "superb" and a "fantastic card in every way," a number of people in the memorabilia industry were not convinced that the card had not been altered at some point.

Soon afterward, Alan Ray came back into the picture, claiming that he had proof the card had been doctored by Mastro at one point after the initial $25,000 trade in 1985. He had a photograph of the card taken before the transaction with Mastro and claimed that the card in the photo looked significantly different from the photo of Gretzky's card. He sent the comparison of the two photos to both McNall and Sotheby's, but never received a response from them. Some memorabilia collectors have dismissed Ray's claims, saying that the photo hardly proves any doctoring was ever done on the card.

On December 4, 2012, Mastro was indicted on federal fraud charges, and entered a plea of not guilty. In 2013, Mastro pleaded guilty, having entered into a plea agreement with federal prosecutors, and admitted to trimming the Honus Wagner card in the mid-1980s to increase its value. Mastro's plea agreement was rejected by a judge. In August 2015, Mastro was sentenced to 20 months in federal prison under a new plea agreement. Mastro was released in May 2017.

A similar but unaltered card, the 'Jumbo Wagner', also has a NM-MT grade quality for the majority of the card, but the lower quality edges have not been trimmed, lowering it from NM-MT to an overall grade of PSA 5 – one of only three (along with Mastro's trimmed card) rated PSA 5 or better – sold at a 2013 auction for $2,105,770.50.

== Topps reissues ==
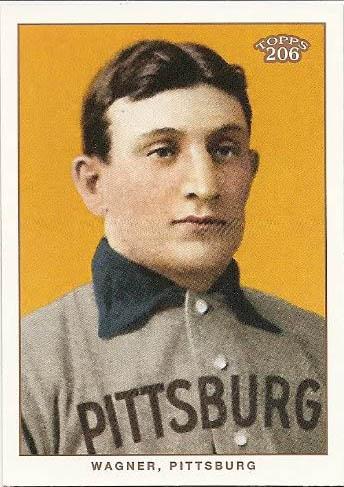
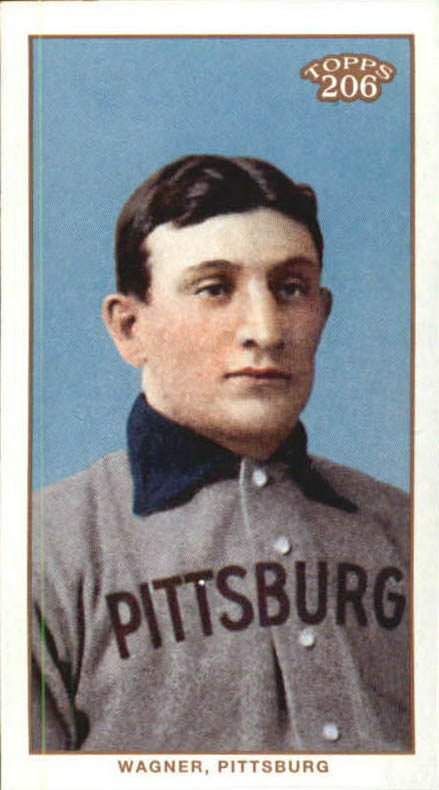
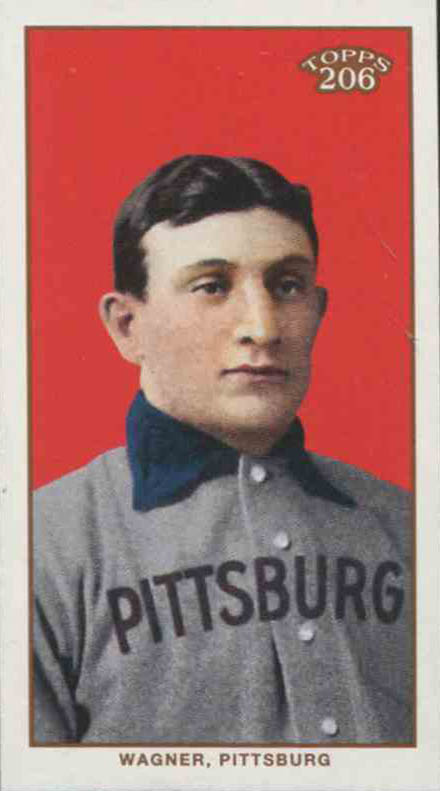
Reissues of the Wagner card by Topps in 2002: #179 similar to 1909 original (but shorter), #307 featuring blue background and #456 with red background

The Honus Wagner card was first reissued by Topps in 2002, with variations on its background color. The card was printed with the original 1909 orange color (#179), and also in blue (#307) and red (#456). In 2020, a new Honus Wagner card was issued by the company (#45) as part of the second wave (of 5) released that year.

== Known controversies ==
=== Cobb–Edwards controversy ===
Another T206 Wagner card owned by two Cincinnati men was dismissed as a fake by Bill Mastro and PSA president Joe Orlando. The two men, John Cobb and Ray Edwards, have tried to prove that their Piedmont-backed card is not a fake and, due to its excellent condition, should fetch over $1 million in an auction. Cobb and Edwards also have alleged that they have been dismissed because they are inner city black men in a hobby that has been dominated by successful white men. Cobb, like Mastro back in the late 1980s, does not divulge the exact details of how he came to own the card. He has variously stated he purchased the card at an estate sale from "an old couple" for $1,800 in 1983 or 1984; he claimed not to know who Honus Wagner was at the time of purchase. When Cobb and Edwards tried to sell the card on eBay in 2002, an attorney from Newport, Kentucky (part of the Cincinnati metro) filed a police report against the two men because he believed the card was a reprint that was stolen from his office months earlier. The police launched an investigation, but found no evidence of wrongdoing. An outraged Edwards dismissed the accusations as "bullshit," adding that they would not have been made "if we were white."

Card Collector Services graded the card and officially ruled that it was indeed a reprint. Cobb and Edwards dismissed the findings and went to Integrated Paper Services (IPS), an independent paper testing and analysis lab, in February 2003 to have their card's paper tested. An IPS expert determined that the card dated back to 1910, which would be consistent to the time period when the card was distributed. The expert ruled that the "paper stock was consistent with the time that card would have been made." Cobbs and Edwards later went to an Ohio paper industry consultant who confirmed that the card was from 1909. The consultant stated that a decent counterfeit of the card could only be produced from a "master pressman with 5–10 years experience, and would require a machine which would cost between $500,000 and $2 million." It was surmised that Cobb and Edwards simply purchased a reprinted version of the T206 Honus Wagner and glued an authentic reverse side to it after removing it from an authentic T206 cigarette card. The tests were only performed on the back of the card, not the front, which is modern.

Afterwards, an appraiser named Bob Connelly valued the card at $850,000, based on the two previous paper analysis reports. In November 2005, Cobb and Edwards put the card up for sale on eBay. They had to shut down the sale, however, because Connelly only agreed to appraise the card if his report was printed in its entirety at the eBay card listing. The reality, however, was that the card was a fake.

A few months after the sale, Edwards asked Connelly if he would accept the card for his auction. Connelly consented and took the card across the country to prospective buyers. Meanwhile, HBO's Real Sports with Bryant Gumbel decided to cover the progress of Cobb and Edwards' struggles with the card. Connelly met a card dealer in New York City, Mike Mangasarian, who was sent on behalf of a prominent collector to check the card out. Mangasarian said the card seemed authentic and stated he would attend the auction for the card later on if the card could be taken out of the thick lucite holder for a closer examination. A promise was made that this could be done the day of the auction in Binghamton, New York. After the auction and by not bidding on the card Mangasarian revealed to HBO that he felt the back of the card was indeed real but in his opinion the front was not. He explained that all T-206s have dark brown letters printed for the team's name and player's name and this one was in black. Additionally, he stated that he was not comfortable with the print process exhibited on the card's front. Meanwhile, a number of card collectors who doubted the card contacted eBay and demanded that the card's listing on the website be removed. eBay officials decided to remove the listing the day before the auction was scheduled to begin. As a result, a number of previously interested collectors decided not to bid for the card at the auction the next day. As Connelly pointed out, the collectors chose not to make bids because "[w]hen eBay pulled the card ... it raised too many questions about its authenticity."

== Other notable authentic T206 Wagner cards ==
As a result of the publicity generated from the financially successful Gretzky T206 Honus Wagner, a number of previously undiscovered legitimate T206 Wagner cards have surfaced. There are fewer than 60 authenticated Wagner cards in existence.

=== New York Public Library ===
An authentic card is part of the Leopold Morse Goulston Baseball Collection in the New York Public Library's George Arents Collection.

=== Metropolitan Museum of Art ===
An authentic card is held by the Metropolitan Museum of Art in New York City.

=== Nuns auctioning T206 Wagner ===
In 2010, a rare Honus Wagner was found in a box left by the brother of Sister Virginia Muller, who left all her possessions to the Baltimore-based School Sisters of Notre Dame. The card came with her brother's handwritten note: "Although damaged, the value of this baseball card should increase exponentially throughout the 21st century!" The Roman Catholic nuns auctioned the card, which despite its poor condition was expected to fetch between $150,000 and $200,000. On November 4, 2010, the final sale price exceeded the expectations of auctioneers at Dallas-based Heritage Auctions and sold for $262,000 to Doug Walton, a collector and card-shop owner. Walton, however, never paid, and Heritage Auctions subsequently contacted one of its longtime clients, Nicholas DePace, a New Jersey cardiologist, who immediately agreed to buy the card for the same price. On December 20, 2010, after taking its 19.5 percent buyer's premium, the auction house sent $220,000 by bank wire to the School Sisters of Notre Dame. The religious order had already announced that the proceeds from the sale would go to its ministries in more than 30 countries. It is currently on display in the Rally Rd Showroom in the Soho section of New York City. In 2019, Rally Rd announced that it was going to begin selling shares in the card at $52 each. In May 2020, Gregorio Amor and a team of investors, purchased the card.

=== The 'Jumbo Wagner' ===
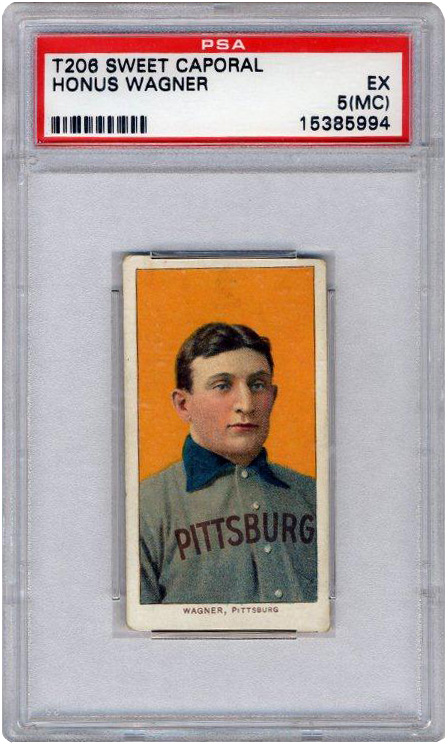
1909 T206 Honus Wagner Baseball Card with PSA grade EX 5-MC

Many of the remaining T206 Honus Wagner cards in existence have rated low on the PSA grading scale. Only three existing Wagner cards received a PSA rating of EX [5] or better. One such example is known in the industry as the 'Jumbo Wagner' [shown on the right]. Graded EX 5 (MC) on the PSA grading scale, the card has unusually ample borders due to a miscut. These dimensions far exceed the standard size for a T206 baseball card, virtually preserving a Near Mint example within its boundaries.

President of PSA, Joe Orlando said "The PSA EX 5 (MC) 1909-11 T206 Honus Wagner (serial number 15385994) is, without question, one of the top examples of this historic card known. The technical grade includes the MC qualifier. The card was given this designation by PSA due to its oversized nature. This particular T206 Honus Wagner stands out from other known examples and therefore gives it placement as a top-notch specimen."

Initially sold at auction for $1.62M in 2008, the 'Jumbo Wagner' was featured by Goldin Auctions in their 2013 Winter Auction, which closed on April 5, 2013. Historical price increases and the state of the sports collectible market contributed to projections that the auction could set a new overall price record for the sale of a T206 Honus Wagner. The card ultimately sold for $2,105,770.50, including the buyer's premium, a record price for a baseball card in a public auction.

=== The All Star Cafe Wagner ===
In April 2013, Robert Edward Auctions was scheduled to begin an auction of a T206 Honus Wagner that was once owned by actor Charlie Sheen. Sheen had loaned the card to the All Star Cafe where it was stolen and later recovered by the FBI. It is graded PSA 1. It sold in March 2022 for $3,060,000, setting a record for a PSA 1 example.

=== The Hoadley's Don Bradman card ===
The 1928 Hoadley's Chocolates Donald Bradman card, often referred to as the T206 Bradman, is an extremely rare Australian confection card featuring cricketer Sir Donald Bradman, issued as part of the Melbourne confectionery firm's 1928 "Australian Cricketers" set. The issue is widely recognized in sports card collecting and cricket memorabilia as Bradman's definitive rookie trade card, produced during the season of his first-class emergence and Test debut against England.

The card was distributed inside confectionery packaging manufactured by Hoadley's Chocolates in Victoria. Because Australian trade issues of the late 1920s were printed on thin card stock and distributed alongside confectionery, the few surviving examples frequently exhibit handling wear, creasing, and corner roundedness. Only a handful of authentic examples are cataloged across public collections and third-party grading population reports, making it arguably the premier trading card of pre-war cricket collecting.

== T206 Honus Wagner Sales ==
Year	Date	Grade	Cert Number	Price (USD)	Sale Venue	Link	Notes
2000	7/15/2000	PSA 8	00000001	$1,270,000	eBay	t206 Museum	Formerly owned by Wayne Gretzky, Bruce McNall
2001	7/15/2000	Ungraded	—	$86,730	MastroNet Auctions	t206 Museum	Piedmont Back
2002	7/15/2000	PSA 1	05513734	$78,144	MastroNet Auctions	t206 Museum	—
2004	—	PSA PR-FR 1	11731736	$109,638	MastroNet Auctions	t206 Museum	—
2005	12/2005	GAI 3.5	10278617	$456,057	MastroNet Auctions	t206 Museum	Frank Nagy copy
2005	4/15/2005	PSA 2	12124375	$236,706	MastroNet Auctions	t206 Museum	—
2007	2/27/2007	PSA 8	00000001	$2,800,000	Private Sale	t206 Museum	Bought by Ken Kendrick, Owner of Arizona Diamondbacks
2008	—	BVG 1	0005445097	$317,250	REA Auctions	REA Auctions	The Beckett Wagner. Graded with BVG now BGS.
2008	—	SGC 3	1255905-001	$826,000	Philip Weiss Auctions	t206 Museum	—
2008	5/02/2008	SGC 1	1242674-001	$227,050	Heritage Auctions	Heritage Auctions	—
2008	8/01/2008	PSA 5	15385994	$1,620,000	MastroNet Auctions	t206 Museum	Miscut
2009	—	PSA 1	05513734	$399,500	REA Auctions	REA Auctions	Charlie Sheen All-Star Cafe
2009	—	SGC 3	—	$925,000	Private Sale	t206 Museum	Brokered by Memory Lane, Inc.
2009	7/31/2009	PSA "Authentic"	15781170	$222,000	Legendary Live Auctions	t206 Museum	Restored
2010	—	PSA 1	31641776	$282,000	REA Auctions	REA Auctions	The Connecticut Wagner
2011	—	PSA "Authentic"	15781170	$188,000	REA Auctions	REA Auctions	Restored - Only example of this card going "down" in value from prior sale.
2012	—	PSA 2	05075146	$651,750	REA Auctions	REA Auctions	Date Stamped
2012	8/24/2012	SGC "Authentic"	1289652-008	$198,850	Goodwin & Co. Auctions	Goodwin & Co.>	—
2013	—	PSA 1	05513734	$402,900	REA Auctions	REA Auctions	Charlie Sheen All-Star Cafe
2013	4/05/2013	PSA 5	15385994	$2,246,155	Goldin Auctions	Goldin Auction	—
2015	—	PSA 3	18297402	$1,320,000	REA Auctions	REA Auctions	—
2016	10/01/2016	PSA 5	15385994	$3,120,000	Goldin Auctions	Goldin Auctions	Miscut
2016	—	SGC 1	1377206-001	$444,000	REA Auctions	REA Auctions	—
2018	12/15/2018	PSA "Authentic"	15781170	$420,000	Memory Lane, Inc.	t206 Museum	Restored
2019	9/19/2019	PSA "Authentic Altered"	20931527	$540,000	Heritage Auctions	Heritage Auctions	Altered
2020	11/01/2020	PSA 1	11967279	$1,392,000	Goldin Auctions	Goldin Auctions	—
2021	—	SGC 3	4846573	$6,606,296	REA Auctions	REA Auctions	—
2021	—	PSA 1.5	57761781	$2,280,000	Heritage Auctions	Heritage Auctions	—
2021	5/22/2021	PSA 2	07115068	$3,660,000	Goldin Auctions	t206 Museum	—
2021	10/30/2021	PSA "Authentic"	50025597	$1,100,000	SCP Auctions	t206 Museum	Restored
2022	—	PSA "Authentic Altered"	20931527	$1,528,066	REA Auctions	REA Auctions	White Border Wagner
2022	4/01/2022	PSA 1	05513734	$3,060,000	Mile High Card Company	Mile High Card Company	Charlie Sheen All-Star Cafe
2022	6/19/2022	PSA "Genuine"	00000002	$475,960	SCP Auctions	SCP Auctions	Half card (Torn)
2022	10/09/2022	PSA 1.5	57761781	$3,720,000	Goldin Auction	Goldin Auction	—
2022	8/05/2022	SGC 2	2183516	$7,250,000	Goldin Auctions	USA Today Article	Record sale, Private Sale
2023	9/08/2023	PSA "Authentic"	50025597	$1,968,000	Mile High Card Company	Mile High Card Company	Restored
2025	4/27/2025	PSA "Authentic"	50025597	$1,980,000	Mile High Card Company	Mile High Card Company	Restored
2026	2/21/2026	PSA 1	124121624	$5,124,000	Goldin Auctions	Goldin Auctions	Shields Family Collection
2026	8/9/2026	CGC "Authentic"	6166912001	$1,337,263	Love of the Game Auctions	Love of the Game Auctions	Restored, sold by Keith Olbermann
2026	8/21/2026	SGC "Authentic"	8262486	$5,856,000	Heritage Auctions	Heritage Auctions	Piedmont Back

== See also ==
- Honus & Me, a 1997 children's fiction book about the card
- Swindle, a 2013 children's fiction movie based on the card
