= T206 Ty Cobb =

Baseball card issued 1909–1911

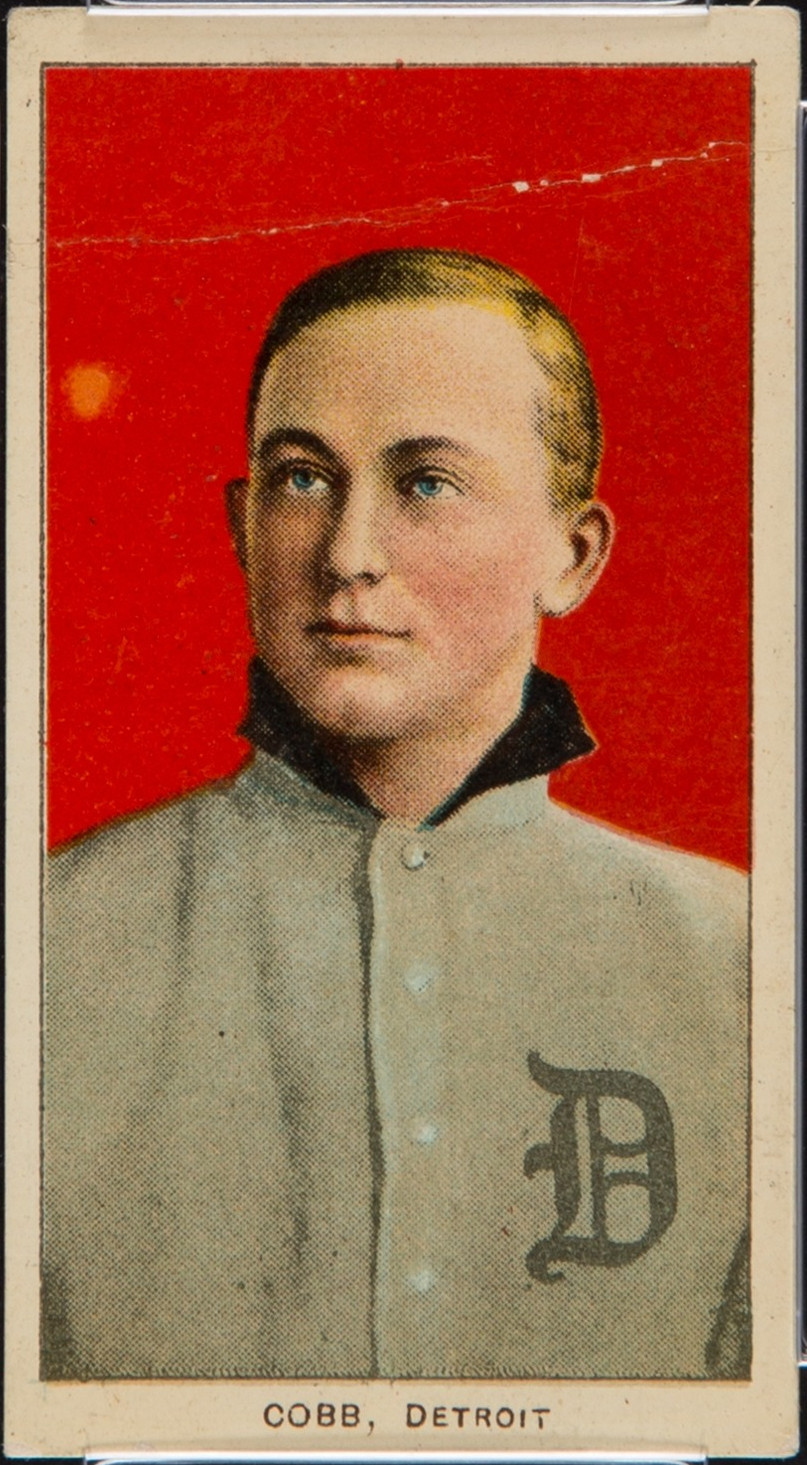
- T206 Ty Cobb card
- Type: Baseball card
- Company: American Tobacco
- Country: United States
- Availability: 1909–1911
- Features: Ty Cobb

The T206 Ty Cobb baseball card depicts the Detroit Tigers' Ty Cobb, one of the inaugural inductees in the Baseball Hall of Fame. The card was designed and issued by the American Tobacco Company (ATC) from 1909 to 1911 as part of its T206 series. The card with the Ty Cobb Smoking Tobacco World back is rarer than the famous T206 Honus Wagner, which had a limited production.

== Description ==
The card's obverse features a portrait of Cobb surrounded by a white border. The more common version has the portrait on a red background although there is a more rare green background version. Different versions of the card have advertisements for different tobacco brands. The reverse of cards which advertise Cobb's own brand has green print lettering which reads: ""TY COBB — KING OF THE SMOKING TOBACCO WORLD."

== Notable examples ==
=== Lucky 7 ===
In 2016, a cache of seven T206 Ty Cobb baseball cards were discovered in a paper bag when a family was cleaning out their deceased great-grandfather's home. These cards were nicknamed the "Lucky 7" and brought the total number of known T206 Ty Cobb's in existence to 22. The cards were authenticated and initially valued at around $1 million. They later sold for $3 million in 2016.

=== Weisenberg cards ===
In August 2022, Jeff Weisenberg purchased a collection of 1,000 T206 cards which included 16 Ty Cobbs. Among these were the only known examples of Cobbs with an ad for Carolina Brights cigarettes on the back.
