= List of most expensive sports cards =

a list of sports cards that have sold for an inflation-adjusted price of over $500,000. The list is ordered by inflation-adjusted value (in bold) in millions of United States dollars.

This list includes only the highest price paid for a given card and does not include separate entries for individual copies of the same card or multiple sales prices for the same copy of a card. Thus, for example, the T206 Honus Wagner is represented on this list by one particular card's 2021 sale and does not include the same card's 2012 sale for $1.2 million or the Jumbo Wagner and its $3.12 million sale price.

Cards are evaluated by third-party services, most often Professional Sports Authenticator (PSA), Beckett Grading Services (BGS), or Sportscard Guaranty Corporation (SGC), and given a grade on a ten-point scale based on condition.

The first sports card to sell for one million dollars was a T206 Honus Wagner which sold for $1,265,000 at auction in 2000 (equivalent to $2,365,000 in 2025).

The images below do not necessarily represent the individual specimen sold but are representative of the given cards.

Inflation-adjusted price (Note: The Wikipedia template uses a yearly average inflation. Using monthly averages gives slightly different numbers, most significantly for paintings sold early or late in a year with significant inflation.)	Original price	Athlete(s)	Year	Card	Population	Grade	Image	Date of sale	Auction house	Notes
$13,862,292	$12,600,000	Mickey Mantle	1952	Topps	c. 2,372	SGC MT 9.5		August 28, 2022	Heritage Auctions	Set record for most expensive sports memorabilia ever sold at auction. More than doubled the previous record for a sports card.
$13,272,207	$12,932,000	Michael Jordan / Kobe Bryant	2007–08	Upper Deck Exquisite Collection Dual Logoman Autographs	Serial numbered #1/1	PSA EX-MT 6		August 23, 2025	Heritage Auctions	Purchased by a group of three investors which included Kevin O'Leary. Not accounting for inflation, it set a record for most expensive sports and basketball card ever.
$8,613,994	$7,250,000	Honus Wagner	1909–11	T206	c. 47	SGC 2		August 3, 2022	Private sale	It is generally believed that only 50 to 200 of the cards were ever produced. This sale was brokered by Goldin Auctions.
$7,608,126	$7,200,000	Babe Ruth	1914	Baltimore News (red)	c. 10	SGC VG 3		December 3, 2023	Robert Edwards Auctions	A blue variant of this card sold for $575,000 in 2021. It was the first card of Ruth ever produced. It had been owned by the descendants of the paperboy who collected it in 1914 and was housed at the Babe Ruth Birthplace and Museum.
$7,010,009	$5,900,000	Stephen Curry	2009	Panini National Treasures Logoman Autograph	Serial numbered #1/1	PSA NM-MT 8		July 6, 2021	Private sale	Highest sale ever for a basketball card at the time. Purchased by Alt Fund II, the second investment fund managed by Alt which is a company that specializes in alternative assets.
$6,469,075	$5,200,000	LeBron James	2003	Upper Deck Exquisite Collection Rookie Patch Autographs	Serial numbered #07/23	BGS MT 9		April 26, 2021	PWCC Marketplace	The sale was the highest ever for a basketball card at the time. There was a similar LeBron James card that sold for $1.845 million in May 2020.
$5,465,430	$4,600,000	Luka Dončić	2018	Panini National Treasures Logoman Autograph	Serial numbered #1/1	Ungraded		February 28, 2021	Private sale	The sale was made public on Luka Dončić's birthday. The card previously sold for $3.2 million in a private deal in December 2019.
$5,200,000	$5,200,000	Aaron Judge	2013	Bowman Chrome Draft Pick Superfractor Autograph	Serial numbered #1/1	BGS GEM-MINT 9.5		March 12, 2026	Private sale	Set a record for a modern baseball card. The buyer and seller both wished to remain anonymous. The same card had sold for $324,000 in 2022.
$5,108,989	$4,300,000	Patrick Mahomes	2017	Panini National Treasures Platinum Shield Rookie Patch Autographs	Serial numbered #1/1	BGS NM-MT 8.5		July 2021	Private sale	Set the record for most expensive football card. The buyer was a card shop in New Albany, Ohio and the sale was brokered by PWCC Marketplace.
$5,004,433	$4,212,000	Babe Ruth	1933	Goudey #53	c. 1,986	PSA MINT 9		July 10, 2021	Memory Lane Inc.	Ruth appeared on four different cards in the 1933 Goudey set: #53, #144, #149 and #181. There are no copies of this card with a higher grade.
$4,896,593	$3,936,000	Mike Trout	2009	Bowman Chrome Draft Prospects Superfractor Autograph	Serial numbered #1/1	BGS MT 9		August 23, 2020	Goldin Auctions	The seller, gambling consultant David "Vegas Dave" Oancea, had bought the card for only $400,000 only two years prior.
$4,455,514	$3,750,000	Wayne Gretzky	1979	O-Pee-Chee	c. 10,873	PSA GM-MT 10		May 27, 2021	Private sale	The only other PSA GM-MT 10 had previously set the record for the most expensive hockey card, having sold for $1,290,000 just 5 months prior.
$3,691,984	$3,107,372.40	Tom Brady	2000	Playoff Contenders Championship Rookie Ticket Autograph	Serial numbered #8/100	BGS MINT 9		June 4, 2021	Lelands	Broke the record for the most expensive football card which had been set two months earlier by a different copy of the same card in a Lelands auction.
$3,511,781	$3,192,000	Mickey Mantle	1951	Bowman	c. 2,066	PSA MT 9		December 3, 2022	Memory Lane Inc.	The 1951 Bowman is the only recognized rookie card of Mickey Mantle who is the most collected figure in the industry.
$3,005,028	$2,928,000	Michael Jordan	1997	Upper Deck Ultimate Collection Ultimate Logos Signature	Serial numbered #1/1	PSA Authentic		June 2, 2024	Goldin Auctions	The whereabouts of this card were unknown to the public until it was submitted to PSA for authentication in 2022.
$2,640,437	$2,400,000	LeBron James	2020–21	Panini Flawless Triple Logoman Patch Autograph	Serial numbered #1/1	PSA Authentic		June 25, 2022	Goldin Auctions	Ten-card boxes of Panini Flawless were sold for approximately $15,000. The sale was described on ESPN.com as "arguably the most promoted card sale of all time." It set a record for a card which was pulled from a pack and resold in the same year.
$2,565,769	$2,500,000	Michael Jordan	1986–87	Fleer	c. 48,439	PSA MINT 9 / AUTO 10		June 26, 2025	Joopiter	The first sports card ever sold by Pharrell's auction house, Joopiter. One of nine Jordan rookie cards privately autographed in blue marker in 2024.
$2,376,274	$2,000,000	Kobe Bryant	1997	Metal Universe Precious Metal Gems - Green	10	BGS NM-MT+ 8.5		February 22, 2022	Private sale	Set a record for a Kobe Bryant card. The Precious Metal Gems were serially numbered to 100 with 1-10 being Green and 11-100 being Red.
$2,310,580	$1,857,300	Giannis Antetokounmpo	2013–14	Panini National Treasures Logoman Patch Autograph	Serial numbered #1/1	BGS MT 9		September 20, 2020	Goldin Auctions	Broke the record for a basketball card which had been set only two months and two days earlier.
$2,133,657	$1,795,800	Kobe Bryant	1996–97	Topps Chrome Refractor	c. 742	BGS PRISTINE/Black Label 10		March 6, 2021	Goldin Auctions	The same copy of this card had been sold for just $58,100 on eBay in 2016.
$1,980,327	$1,800,000	Justin Herbert	2020	Panini National Treasures Platinum NFL Shield Autograph	Serial numbered #1/1	BGS NM-MT+ 8.5		September 11, 2022	Goldin Auctions	This card was sold later in the same week that another Herbert card sold for $1.1 million.
$1,870,331	$1,770,000	Babe Ruth	1916	M101-4 Sporting News (Sporting News back)	c. 35	SGC NM 7		February 25, 2023	Heritage Auctions	Although called the Sporting News set, many other companies advertised on the backs of these cards. The February 25, 2023 card advertised the Sporting News on the back.
$1,870,309	$1,700,000	Joe Burrow	2020	Panini National Treasures Platinum NFL Shield Autograph	Serial numbered #1/1	BGS GEM-MINT 9.5		September 12, 2022	Private sale	
$1,848,306	$1,680,000	Michael Jordan / LeBron James / Kobe Bryant	2006–07	Upper Deck Exquisite Collection All NBA Access Triple Logoman	Serial numbered #1/1	PSA Authentic		August 6, 2022	Goldin Auctions	
$1,826,761	$1,537,500	LeBron James	2003–04	Upper Deck Exquisite Collection Rookie Patch Autographs	Serial numbered #32/99	BGS NM-MT+ 8.5		March 6, 2021	Goldin Auctions	
$1,744,723	$1,700,000	Wilt Chamberlain	1961	Fleer	c. 3,170	SGC 10		September 2024	Private sale	The only recognized rookie card of Wilt Chamberlain, it set a record for a vintage basketball card. This private sale was brokered by Goldin Auctions.
$1,710,917	$1,440,000	Michael Jordan	1997–98	Upper Deck Game Jerseys	Serial numbered #8/23	PSA NM 7		February 5, 2021	PWCC Marketplace	The autographed card features a swatch of the jersey he wore during the 1992 NBA All-Star Game. Set a record for a Jordan card. A copy of the same card with a higher grade from BGS sold for just $840,000 two years later.
$1,662,618	$1,620,000	Babe Ruth	1933	Goudey #149	c. 1,905	SGC VG 3		November 21, 2024	Fanatics Collect	Ruth appeared on four different cards in the 1933 Goudey set: #53, #144, #149 and #181. Another Ruth card from this set, the yellow-backgrounded #53, sold for $4,212,000 in 2021.
$1,539,461	$1,500,000	Lionel Messi	2004–05	Panini Mega Cracks	c. 1,820	PSA GEM MT 10		August 2025	Private sale	Set a record for a soccer card.
$1,534,479	$1,291,500	LeBron James	2004–05	Upper Deck Ultimate Signatures Logos #USL-LJ Signed Logoman	Serial numbered #1/1	PSA Authentic		March 6, 2021	Goldin Auctions	Set record for any 2004 LeBron James card.
$1,354,476	$1,140,000	Giannis Antetokounmpo	2013–14	Panini Prizm Black Mosaic	Serial numbered #1/1	BGS GM-MT 9.5		December 12, 2020	Goldin Auctions	
$1,315,268	$1,107,000	Roberto Clemente	1955	Topps	c. 11,156	PSA MT 9		June 3, 2021	Goldin Auctions	Set record for a Roberto Clemente card.
$1,283,188	$1,080,000	Patrick Mahomes	2017	Panini National Treasures Holo Gold Rookie Patch Autographs	Serial numbered #3/10	BGS GEM MINT 9.5		September 18, 2021	PWCC Marketplace	Rarer parallels of the same card had sold for $4,300,000 and $840,000 earlier in the same year.
$1,281,000	$1,050,000	Macklin Celebrini	2024-25	Upper Deck Young Guns Outburst Gold	#451 (1/1)	PSA		August 15, 2026	Goldin Auctions	This 1-of-1 gold outburst Celebrini card shattered records for the most expensive non-Gretzky hockey card ever sold. Celebrini recorded a staggering 115 point total in just his second NHL season.
$1,095,583	$1,067,500	Shohei Ohtani	2024	Topps 50/50 Shohei Ohtani Black Dynasty Relic Autograph	Serial numbered #1/1	PSA MINT 9		March 29, 2025	Heritage Auctions	The card included the MLB logo patch worn on Ohtani's pants when he became the first player in league history to have a 50–50 season. The ball from the same home run was separately auctioned for $4.392 million.
$1,247,544	$1,050,000	Mike Trout	2011	Topps Update Platinum	Serial numbered #1/1	BGS MT 9		July 29, 2021	Private sale	Purchased by DJ and Entrepreneur DJ Skee. Was displayed at the 2021 Topps booth at the National Sports Collectors Convention
$1,211,900	$1,020,000	Anthony Davis	2012–13	Panini National Treasures NBA Logoman Rookie Patch Autographs	Serial numbered #1/1	BGS MT 9		January 30, 2021	Goldin Auctions	Set record for an Anthony Davis card.
$1,210,200	$1,100,000	Justin Herbert	2020	Panini Prizm Black Finite	Serial numbered #1/1	BGS 9		September 2022	Private sale	This sale made Herbert the third NFL player to have a card sell for over $1 million after Tom Brady and Patrick Mahomes.
$1,194,791	$1,005,600	Reggie Jackson	1969	Topps	c. 18,644	PSA GM-MT 10		February 28, 2021	Heritage Auctions	There are no other copies of the card graded as highly as this one which was previously owned by Dmitri Young.
$1,188,196	$1,080,000	Stephen Curry	2009–10	Panini National Treasures "Century Platinum" Rookie Patch Autograph	Serial numbered #4/5	PSA MINT 9		August 6, 2022	Goldin Auctions	
$1,188,196	$1,080,000	Mike Trout	2009	Bowman Chrome Draft Red Refractor Autograph	Serial numbered #5/5	BGS GEM-MINT 9.5		October 2022	PWCC Marketplace	The same copy of this card set a record in 2020 for a modern-day card when it sold for $922,500.
$1,169,127	$984,000	Jackie Robinson	1952	Topps	c. 2,024	PSA MT 9		March 6, 2021	Goldin Auctions	In 1953, unsold cards from the set were returned to Topps by retailers and dumped in the Hudson River.
$1,139,201	$1,110,000	Paul Skenes	2024	Topps Chrome Update MLB Debut Patch Autograph	Serial numbered #1/1	PSA GM-MT 10		March 21, 2025	Fanatics Collect	The buyer was Dick's Sporting Goods. Fanatics vowed to donate their portion of the sale to the 2025 California wildfire relief efforts.
$1,119,648	$900,000	LeBron James / Michael Jordan	2003–04	Upper Deck Exquisite Collection Logoman	Serial numbered #1/1	BGS NM-MT+ 8.5		February 2020	Goldin Auctions	At the time, set a record for a modern-day card and a basketball card. The buyer was identified as high-end basketball card collector Nat Turner.
$1,096,056	$922,500	Kobe Bryant	2002–03	Upper Deck Autograph Logo Mania	Serial numbered #1/1	BGS MINT 9		October 24, 2021	Goldin Auctions	Set a record for a non-rookie card of Kobe Bryant.
$1,027,002	$933,483.60	Mickey Mantle	1969	Topps (white letter error)	c. 2,251	PSA MINT 9		December 3, 2022	Memory Lane Inc.	This is an error card featuring Mantle's name in white letters instead of yellow. It is around eight times rarer than the yellow-lettered version.
$1,022,986	$861,000	Larry Bird / Julius Erving / Magic Johnson	1980–81	Topps	c. 24,554	PSA GEM MT 10		August 7, 2021	Goldin Auctions	Joint rookie card of Larry Bird and Magic Johnson.
$998,035	$840,000	Patrick Mahomes	2017	Panini National Treasures Black Rookie Patch Autographs	Serial numbered #1/5	BGS MT 9		January 30, 2021	Goldin Auctions	Set the record for most expensive football card.
$990,164	$900,000	Lewis Hamilton	2020	Topps Chrome F1 Superfractor auto	Serial numbered #1/1	PSA MT 8		May 1, 2022	Goldin Auctions	As featured on King of Collectibles: The Goldin Touch, this sale is considered the most expensive F1 card in the world.
$981,664	$700,000	Eddie Plank	1909–11	T206	c. 110	PSA 7		2012	Private sale	Like the T206 Honus Wagner, the reason for the scarcity of T206 Plank cards is unknown.
$961,866	$717,000	Babe Ruth	1916	M101-5 Sporting News (blank back)	c. 49	PSA NM 7		August 28, 2016	Heritage Auctions	Although called the Sporting News set, many other companies advertised on the backs of these cards. The August 28, 2016 card had nothing on the back.
$961,866	$717,000	Pete Rose / Pedro González / Ken McMullen / Al Weis	1963	Topps	c. 6,760	PSA GM-MT 10		August 28, 2016	Goldin Auctions	The only recognized rookie card of Pete Rose.
$949,916	$799,500	Kevin Durant	2007–08	Upper Deck Exquisite Collection Rookie Card Parallel Patch Autographs	Serial numbered #23/35	BGS MT 9		March 6, 2021	Goldin Auctions	Set record for a Kevin Durant card.
$933,040	$750,000	Joe DiMaggio	1941	Play Ball	c. 1,386	PSA GM-MT 10		February 22, 2020	Heritage Auctions	This card was produced during the same year as Joe DiMaggio's 56-game hitting streak.
$926,747	$780,000	Luka Dončić	2018	Panini Prizm Gold Prizm	Serial numbered #3/10	PSA GM-MT 10		January 30, 2021	Goldin Auctions	
$895,718	$720,000	LeBron James	2004	Topps Chrome Superfractor	Serial numbered #1/1	PSA GM-MT 10		October 3, 2020	Heritage Auctions	Set record for a non-autographed 2004 LeBron James card.
$894,990	$667,149	Joe Jackson	1909	American Caramel	c. 124	PSA NM-MT 8		August 21, 2016	SCP Auctions	Set a record for a candy card. Considered a rookie card.
$892,887	$870,000	Ty Cobb	1909–11	T206	c. 837	PSA MT 9		August 23, 2024	Heritage Auctions	One of several Cobb cards from the T206 set. This variant features Cobb holding a bat away from his body on the obverse and an advertisement for Piedmont Cigarettes on the reverse. Another copy of the card sold for $488,425 in 2016.
$846,210	$660,000	Sherry Magee	1909–11	T206 (Error)	c. 110	PSA NM-MT 8		September 21, 2018	Heritage Auctions	Magee's name is erroneously spelled as "Magie."
$821,489	$612,359.83	Nolan Ryan / Jerry Koosman	1968	Topps	c. 17,425	PSA GM-MT 10		August 26, 2016	Heritage Auctions	Nolan Ryan's rookie card
$831,309	$810,000	Michael Jordan	2008–09	Upper Deck Exquisite Collection - Emblems of Endorsements	Serial numbered #02/10	PSA Authentic		October 23, 2025	Fanatics Collect	First recorded public auction appearance; the only gold-ink autograph from the Upper Deck Exquisite licensed era (2003-2009). Patch window has dual meaning: 天 (tiān) = “God/Sky/Heaven” in Chinese; ƎE = emblems of endorsement.
$806,367	$575,000	Babe Ruth	1914	Baltimore News (blue)	c. 8	PSA Good 2		August 2012	Private sale	Features Ruth with the minor league Baltimore Orioles two years before his first Major League card. The seller had bought the card for $199,750 in 2007.
$792,131	$720,000	Henry Aaron	1954	Topps	c. 11,211	PSA MINT 9		August 18, 2022	PWCC Marketplace	A copy of the card with the same grade sold for only $645,000 a year earlier in 2021.
$784,170	$660,000	Babe Ruth	1917	Collins-McCarthy	c. 28	SGC NM-MT 8		February 27, 2021	Heritage Auctions	As of 2021, only nine submissions from the entire 200-card set had been graded this highly by SGC or PSA.
$755,564	$600,000	Joe Jackson	1910	Old Mill	c. 17	PSA VG+ 3.5		February 2019	Heritage Auctions	Features Jackson with the minor league New Orleans Pelicans despite being issued during his Major League career.
$748,526	$630,000	Bill Russell	1957	Topps	c. 1,752	PSA NM-MT+ 8.5		August 21, 2021	Heritage Auctions	Russell's only recognized rookie card. The same copy of the card sold in May 2023 for $660,000 which, adjusted for inflation, is less than the August 21, 2021 inflation-adjusted sale price.
$747,925	$601,200	Stephen Curry	2009–10	Panini National Treasures "Century Gold" Rookie Patch Autographs	Serial numbered #10/25	BGS GM-MT 9.5		December 20, 2020	Goldin Auctions	
$673,306	$501,900	Lew Alcindor	1969–70	Topps	c. 4,433	PSA GM-MT 10		August 26, 2016	Heritage Auctions	Set record for a basketball card. Kareem Abdul-Jabbar's only recognized rookie card.
$641,244	$478,000	Willie Mays	1952	Topps	c. 3,088	PSA MT 9		May 12, 2016	Heritage Auctions	In 1953, unsold cards from the set were returned to Topps by retailers and dumped in the Hudson River.
$634,674	$504,000	Ty Cobb	1915	Cracker Jack	c. 198	PSA MT 9		April 23, 2019	Heritage Auctions	

== See also ==
- List of most expensive books and manuscripts
- List of most expensive CCG cards
- List of most expensive coins
- List of most expensive philatelic items
- Forbes' list of the world's highest-paid athletes
