= T202 baseball card =

T202
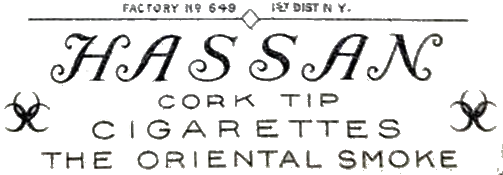
- Type: Baseball card
- Company: American Tobacco Company
- Country: United States
- Availability: 1912–1912
- Materials: Baseball players

The T202 Baseball cards, also known as the Hassan Triple Folder were baseball cards manufactured and distributed by the American Tobacco Company in 1912. The cards were inserted into packs of "Hassan Cork Tip Cigarettes". Several characteristics make this vintage card a standout amongst other forms of tobacco advertising of the time and lend to its value as a highly sought-after collectible.

This set was a step further in comparison with another American Tobacco release, the T201 set of 1911, that had featured two players on the same card.

== Overview ==
The cards were quite large in comparison to the T205 (1911) and T206 (1909 to 1911) cards from the same time period. The T202 was designed as a triptych or as it is referred to in the baseball card collecting hobby a triple folder. Each of the end panels displayed an individual player in color, while the center panel contained a black-and-white photo of "live action" baseball players. To insert the card into packs of cigarettes the two end panels were folded over the center panel. When the card is fully extended it measures 5 1/4" wide by 2 1/4" high.

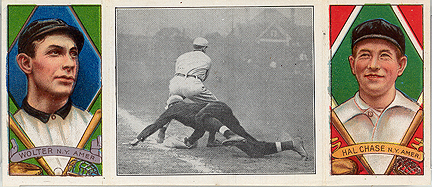
Example of a T202 card, featuring two players on borders (in this case, H. Chase and H. Wolter) and a "live action" scene on the middle

The T202 set consisted of 132 total cards with numerous combinations of end panels and center panels. Prominent players of the time who appeared on the most end and center panel combinations were Christy Mathewson, who appeared on ten different cards all on end panels, and Ty Cobb, who appeared on a combination of over six different cards including end and center panels.

Card backs include biographies for the players and a text describing the live-action scene on the middle. All of those text also featured a Hassan Cigarettes advertising below. Some of the players featured on the end panels also appeared on the middle action, but not always. Both leagues, American and National, also featured different card designs.

== Value ==
According to several recent sales on Ebay, the common T202 that is rated a PSA 5 or better will cost at least $200. Cards that have at least one Hall of Fame player highlighted in any of the three pictures, that are rated a PSA 5 or better will cost at least $250. Some Hall of Famers command higher prices than others, but Ty Cobb generally commands the most money. A Cobb in PSA 5 condition will cost at least $1500 as of 2019. There is an unusual rarity in this set, however. The Lord Catches His Man card, previously considered a common card worth around $100, has dramatically increased in price, due to the speculation that the center picture of the card may be Shoeless Joe Jackson. The theory seems to be backed up by a photo taken in a newspaper from the same year the card came out. The photo and the card appear to match. If the center panel is, in fact, Shoeless Joe Jackson, it will most likely easily be the most valuable card in the set, as he does not appear in any other card.
