= Goudey =

American chewing gum company

Goudey Gum Company
- Trade name: Goudey
- Industry: Candy, Collectibles
- Founded: 1919
- Founder: Enos Gordon Goudey
- Defunct: 1962; 64 years ago
- Fate: Defunct
- Headquarters: Boston, Massachusetts, USA
- Products: Bubble gum Trading cards

The Goudey Gum Company was an American chewing gum company started in 1919. The company was founded by Enos Gordon Goudey (1863–1946) of Barrington Passage, Nova Scotia. Formerly an employee of Beemans, he opened a factory in Boston, Massachusetts in 1919 and later in Allston. It operated there from 1924 until it closed in 1962. Goudey sold the business in 1932 but he retained an interest as a consultant. On his retirement in 1933, William Wrigley Jr. dubbed him the "penny gum king of America". Today the Goudey name is mainly associated with its collectible baseball cards which were introduced in 1933. Goudey was the first American company to issue baseball cards with each stick of gum (they had been available with cigarettes and certain lines of candy for many years).

== Goudey baseball cards ==
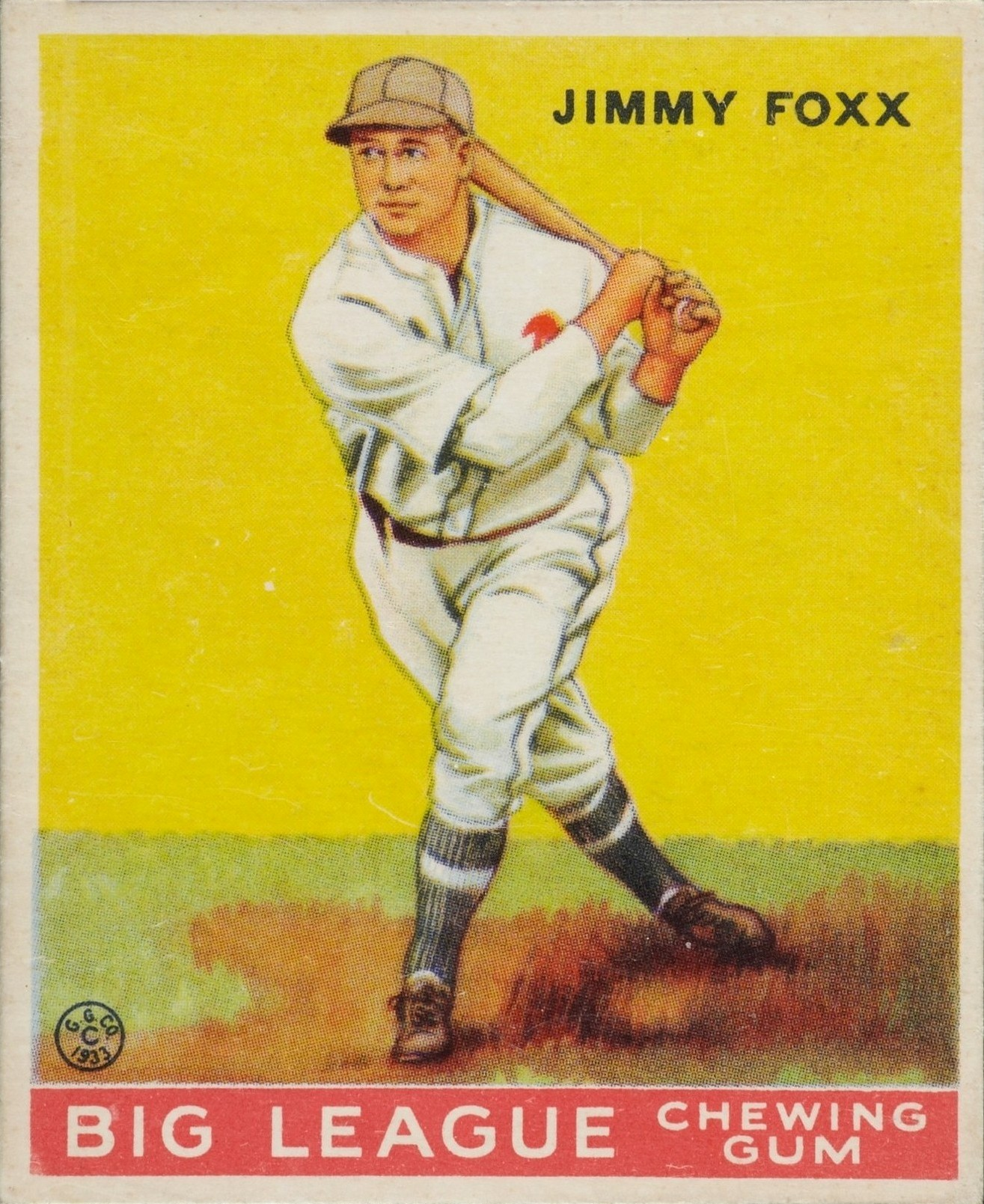
1933 Goudey Jimmie Foxx baseball card, misspelled as "Jimmy"

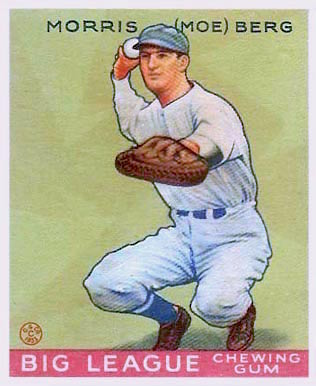
Moe Berg Goudey card

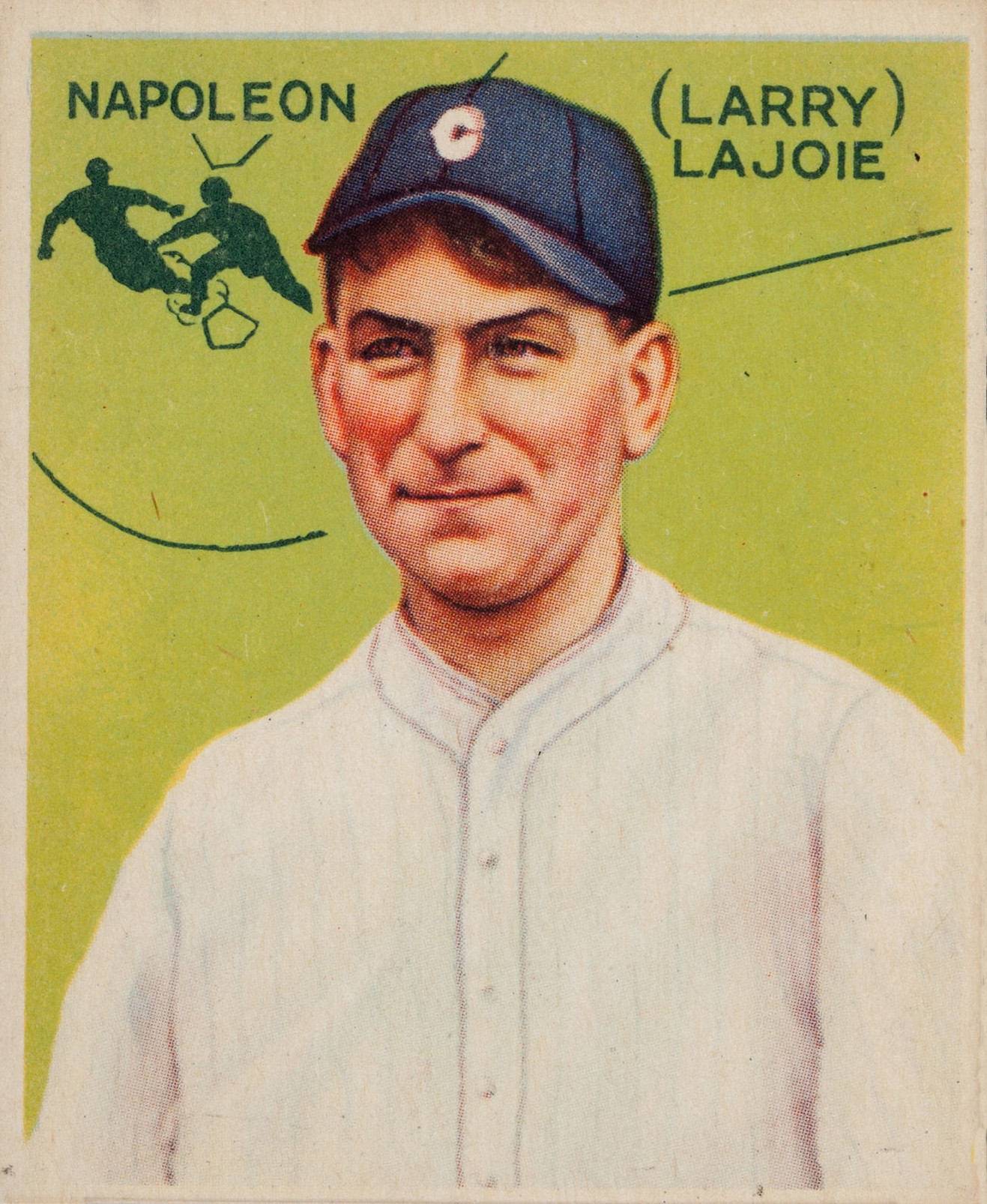
Nap Lajoie Goudey card

Most of the unreleased cards, printing plates, and company archives were thrown away in the 1960s, although some were sold to collectors. Today, cards in good condition command a premium, especially those authenticated and graded by respected third-party graders. Hank Greenberg and Lou Gehrig are prominently featured in the Goudey cards of the 1930s, colorful cards with hand drawn portraits of the players. Other Baseball Hall of Fame and interesting players depicted on Goudey gum cards from 1933 to 1941 include: Babe Ruth, Ty Cobb, Jimmie Foxx, Bill Dickey, Carl Hubbell, Lefty Grove, Dizzy Dean, Mickey Cochrane, Charlie Gehringer, Tony Lazzeri, Mel Ott, Joe DiMaggio, Hank Greenberg, "Ducky" Joe Medwick and Moe Berg.

=== 1933 set ===
In 1933, Goudey produced a 240 card set, also called "Big League Chewing Gum". These cards, issued with bubble gum in each pack, were the first baseball gum cards. The 1933 Goudey set is considered one of the "Big Three" classic baseball card sets, along with the T206 and 1952 Topps sets.

One of the rarest baseball cards from a mainstream set is card #106 from the 1933 Goudey set. It was not originally issued with the set, so collectors could not complete the set from packs. In 1934, Goudey issued card #106 for the 1933 set with retired player Napoleon Lajoie. Collectors that sent letters to the Goudey Gum Company complaining about the lack of a #106 card received it in the mail. The 1933 Goudey #106 Napoleon Lajoie is known as one of the "Big Three" baseball cards along with two cards from the T206 set depicting Honus Wagner and Eddie Plank.

=== 1934 set ===
In 1934, Goudey produced a 96 card set that was endorsed by two players, Lou Gehrig and Chuck Klein. The 1934 Goudey set is sometimes called the "Lou Gehrig" set. There are no Babe Ruth cards in the set. The Hank Greenberg rookie card is in this set.

=== 1935 Set ===
The 1935 Goudey set had a slightly different design, with four smaller images on each card. The "4-in-1" cards feature 36 different cards with red or blue borders. The majority of the images are reused from the 1933 Goudey set. Backs contain 3 or 4 different images. The backs of the cards can be put together like a puzzle to create large images. 6 card puzzles were used for individual players (Mickey Cochrane) and 12 cards to build team photos (Tigers, Indians, and Senators). The set has many stars & Hall of Famers, including Babe Ruth, Hank Greenberg, Mel Ott, Jimmie Foxx, and Dizzy Dean.

=== 1938 set ===
In 1938, Goudey produced a 48 card set, also known as the "Heads-Up" set. The cards were numbered from 241 to 288, thus looking like Goudey was trying to extend the 1933 Goudey set. The first 24 cards in the set depicts pictures of players heads attached to a cartoonish body in baseball action. The next 24 cards in the set depicts the same players and the same poses. The difference is the next 24 cards include small cartoonish characters playing baseball along with captions. Joe DiMaggio, Jimmie Foxx, Hank Greenberg and Bob Feller are the big stars in this set.

=== Canadian Goudey ===
Similar cards as the 1933 and 1934 Goudey sets were also released in Canada by the Goudey-owned World Wide Gum Co, of Granby, Quebec. They are sometimes known as Canadian Goudey sets. There were 94 and 96 cards in these sets, respectively. The 1933 World Wide Gum set was released with two different backs, one with both French and English, and the other with only English. There has not been definitive proof, but one theory is that the French-English backs were sold in Quebec and the English-only backs were sold in Ontario.

=== List of Goudey baseball card sets ===
Year of issuance, popular name and designation from The American Card Catalog:

- 1933 Goudey R319
- 1933 American R338
- 1933 World Wide Gum V353
- 1934 Goudey R320
- 1934 Goudey Premiums R390-1
- 1934 World Wide Gum V354
- 1935 Goudey 4-in-1 R321
- 1935 Goudey Premiums R390-2
- 1936 Goudey Wide Pens R314
- 1936 Goudey R322
- 1936 World Wide Gum V355
- 1938 Goudey "Heads-Up" R323
- 1939 Goudey Premiums R303
- 1939 World Wide Gum V351
- 1941 Goudey R324

=== List of Goudey non-sport sets ===
Year(s), name, quantity and dimensions:

- 1933 Boy Scouts (48), 2 1/8 in × 3 1/4 in (54 mm × 83 mm)
- 1933 Sea Raiders (48), 2 3/8 in × 2 7/8 in (60 mm × 73 mm)
- 1933 World War Gum (96), 2 7/8 in (73 mm)
- 1933-40 Indian Gum (216), 2 3/8 in × 2 7/8 in (60 mm × 73 mm)
- 1934 Big Thrill Booklets (24), 2 5/16 in × 2 7/8 in (59 mm × 73 mm)
- 1935 Majik Fold Pictures (9), 5 1/2 in × 10 1/4 in (140 mm × 260 mm)
- 1935 The Goudey Line R.R., 12 in × 5 in × 5 in (300 mm × 130 mm × 130 mm)
- 1936 Auto License Plates (36), 1 1/2 in × 3 1/4 in (38 mm × 83 mm)
- 1936 History Of Aviation (10), 5 1/2 in (140 mm) square
- 1937 Auto License Plates (69), 1 1/2 in × 3 1/4 in (38 mm × 83 mm)
- 1938 Auto License Plates (66), 1 1/2 in × 3 1/4 in (38 mm × 83 mm)
- 1938-39 Action Gum (96), 2 3/8 in × 2 7/8 in (60 mm × 73 mm)
- 1939 Auto License Plates (30), 1 1/2 in × 3 1/4 in (38 mm × 83 mm)
- 1940 First Column Defenders (24), 2 1/2 in × 3 1/8 in (64 mm × 79 mm)
- 1941 Sky Birds (24), 2 5/16 in × 2 7/8 in (59 mm × 73 mm)
- 1947-48 Indian Gum (96), 2 3/8 in × 2 7/8 in (60 mm × 73 mm)
- Jungle Gum (48), 2 3/8 in × 2 7/8 in (60 mm × 73 mm)
- Our Gang Gum Puzzles (25), 3 11/16 in × 5 1/8 in (94 mm × 130 mm)
- Rainbow Radio Rascals (6), 4 3/8 in × 5 1/2 in (110 mm × 140 mm)
- Soldier Boys (24), 2 1/8 in × 2 7/8 in (54 mm × 73 mm)

== See also ==
- Baseball card
- Bowman Gum
- Fleer
- Topps
