= The American Card Catalog =

American reference book regarding trading cards

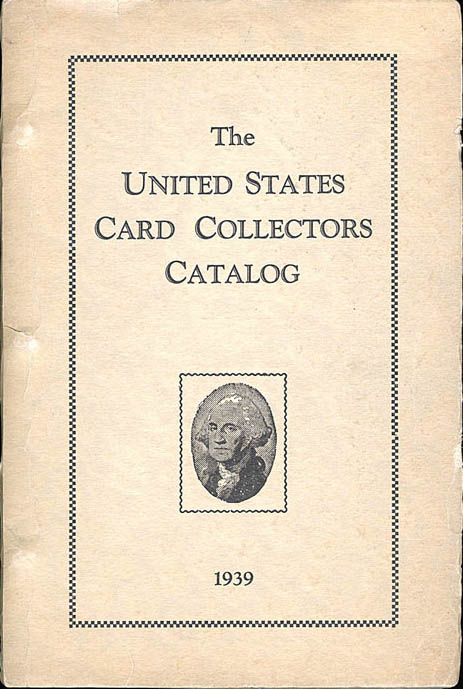
- Cover to the first edition
- Author: Jefferson Burdick
- Language: English
- Subject: Trading cards
- Genre: Collecting
- Published: Syracuse, New York
- Publication date: 1939 (as The United States Card Collectors Catalog)
- Publication place: United States
- Media type: Print
- Pages: 90

The American Card Catalog: The Standard Guide on All Collected Cards and Their Values is a reference book for American trading cards produced before 1951, compiled by Jefferson Burdick. Some collectors regard the book as the most important in the history of collectible cards.

First published in 1939 as The United States Card Collectors Catalog, subsequent editions of the ACC came in 1946 (when it was renamed), 1953 and 1960. Only 500 catalogs were printed in 1939, increasing to 3,000 in its last edition of 1960.

It has become the de facto method in identifying and organizing trade cards produced in the Americas pre-1951. The book catalogues sports and non-sports cards, but is best known for its categorization of baseball cards. Sets like 1909-11 White Borders, 1910 Philadelphia Caramel’s, and 1909 Box Tops are most commonly referred to by their ACC catalogue numbers. They are, respectively, T206, E95, and W555.

The following is a list of card classifications in which baseball cards are found. Two examples of each type have been listed.

== Card classifications ==
=== N-Cards (19th Century Tobacco) ===
==== Examples ====
- 1886 N167 Old Judge New York Giants
- 1887 N28 Allen & Ginter
- 1887 N175 Gypsy Queen
- 1887 N172 Old Judge
- 1887 N184 W.S. Kimball Champions
- 1887 N284 Buchner Gold Coin
- 1887 N370 Lone Jack St. Louis Browns
- 1887 N690-1 Kalamazoo Bats
- 1887 N690-2 Kalamazoo Teams
- 1888 N29 Allen & Ginter
- 1888 N43 Allen & Ginter
- 1888 N162 Goodwin Champions
- 1888 N321 S.F. Hess & Co. California League Creole Cigarettes
- 1888 N333 S.F. Hess Newsboys League
- 1888 N403 Yum Yum Tobacco
- 1889 N526 Number 7 Cigars
- 1889 N338-1 S.F. Hess & Co. California League
- 1889 N338-2 S.F. Hess & Co. Cigarettes
- 1893 N135 Honest Long Cut Tobacco Talk of the Diamond
- 1894 N142 Honest Cabinets
- 1895 N566 Newsboy Cabinets
- 1895 N300 Mayo Cut Plug
- 1896 N301 Mayos Die-Cut Game Cards

=== D-Cards (Bakery/Bread) ===
==== Examples ====
- D310 Pacific Coast Biscuit (1911)
- D311 Pacific Coast Biscuit (1911)
- D322 Tip-Top Bread Pirates (1910)
- D327 Holsum Bread (1917)
- D381 Fleischmann's Bread (1916)
- D382 Tarzan Thoro Bread (1934)
- D383 Koester's Bread World Series Issue (1921)

=== E-Cards (Caramel) ===
==== Examples ====
- 1909-11 E90-1 American Caramel
- 1910 E90-2 American Caramel
- 1910-11 E90-3 American Caramel
- 1908 E91A American Caramel
- 1908 E91B American Caramel
- 1908 E91C American Caramel
- 1908 E91 American Caramel
- 1910 E92 Dockman & Sons
- 1910 E92 Croft's & Allen (also called Croft's Candy. backs come in three colors, black, blue and red)
- 1910 E92 Croft's Cocoa
- 1910 E92 Nadja
- 1911 E93 Standard Caramel
- 1911 E94 George Close Candy
- 1909 E95 Philadelphia Caramel
- 1910 E96 Philadelphia Caramel
- 1910 E97 Briggs (two variations, color and B&W)
- 1909 E98 Anonymous
- 1910 E99 Bishop & Company
- 1910 E100 Bishop & Company
- 1909 E101 Anonymous
- 1908 E102 Anonymous
- 1910 E103 Williams Caramel Company
- 1910 E104-I Nadja Caramels
- 1910 E104-II Nadja Caramels
- 1910 E104-III Nadja Caramels
- 1910 E105 Mello-Mint Gum
- 1915 E106 American Caramel Co.
- 1903 E107 Breisch Williams
- 1922 E120 American Caramel Co.
- 1921 E121 American Caramel Co.
- 1922 E122 American Caramel Co.
- 1923 E123 Curtis Ireland Candy
- 1910 E125 American Caramel Co.
- 1927 E126 American Caramel
- 1917 E135 Collins-McCarthy
- 1912 E136 Home Run Kisses
- 1914 E145-1 Cracker Jack
- 1915 E145-2 Cracker Jack
- 1927 E210 York Caramels
- 1921-23 E220 National Caramel Company
- 1910 E221 Bishop & Company Team Cards
- 1910 E222 A.W.H. Caramels
- 1888 E223 G & B Chewing Gum
- 1914 E224 Texas Tommy
- 1921 E253 Oxford Confect.
- 1909-11 E254 Colgan's Chips
- 1912 E270 Colgan's Chips
- 1910 E271 Darby Chocolates
- 1933 E285 Rittenhouse Candy
- 1910 E286 Ju-Ju Drums
- 1912 E300 Plow's Candy

=== F-Cards (Food -Ice Cream & Dairy) ===
==== Examples ====
- 1916 F-UNC Tango Eggs
- 1928 F50 Harrington's Ice Cream
- 1928 F50 Sweetman
- 1928 F50 Tharp's Ice Cream
- 1928 F50 Yuengling's Ice Cream
- 1937-38 F7 Dixie Lids

=== M-Cards (Publications) ===
==== Examples ====
- M101-1 Sporting News Supplements (1899-1900)
- M101-2 Sporting News Supplements (1909–1913)
- M101-4 Sporting News (1916)
- M101-5 Sporting News (1915)
- M101-6 Felix Mendelssohn (1919)
- M101-7 Sporting News Supplements (1926)
- M110 Sporting Life Cabinets
- M116 Sporting Life (1911)
- M117 Sporting Times (1888–1889)

=== R-Cards (Gum) ===
==== Examples ====
- 1933 R317 Douesh Jacks Candy
- 1933 R319 Goudey
- 1934 R320 Goudey
- 1934-36 R327 Diamond Stars
- 1933 R333 Delong
- 1939 R334 Play Ball
- 1952 R414-6 Topps

=== T-Cards (20th Century Tobacco) ===
==== Examples ====
- T3 Turkey Red (1911)
- T5 Pinkerton Cabinets (1911)
- T200 Fatima Team (1913)
- T201 Mecca Double Folders (1911)
- T202 Hassan Triple Folders (1912)
- T203 Baseball Comics (1910)
- T204 Ramly (1909)
- T205 "Gold Borders" (1911)
- T206 "White Borders" (1909–1911)
- T207 "Brown Background" (1912)
- T208 Fireside Athletics (1912)
- T209 Contentnea (1910)
- T210 Old Mill (1910)
- T211 Red Sun (1910)
- T212 Obak (1909–1911)
- T213 Coupon Cigarettes (1910-1919)
- T214 Victory (1915)
- T215 Red Cross (1910–1913)
- T216 People's (1910–1914)
- T217 Mono Cigarettes Company (1911)
- T222 Fatima Players (1914)
- T227 Honest Long Cut (1912)
- T231 Fan's Cigarettes (1922)
- T330-2 Piedmont Stamps (1914)
- T332 Helmar Stamps (1911)

=== W-Cards (Strip Cards / Exhibits) ===
==== Examples ====
- 1920-21 W514 Strips
- 1921 W461 Exhibits
- 1946-49 W603 Sports Exchange

=== WG-Cards (Game Cards) ===
==== Examples ====
- 1906 WG2/3 Fan Craze
- 1914 WG4 Polo Ground Card Game

=== V-cards/C-Cards (Non-United States Cards) ===
==== Examples ====
- 1910-11 C56 Imperial Tobacco (Hockey, Canada)
- 1911-12 C55 Imperial Tobacco (Hockey, Canada)
- 1912-13 C57 Imperial Tobacco (Hockey, Canada)
- 1923-24 V128-1 Paulin's Candy (Hockey, Canada)
- 1923-24 V145-1 William Patterson (Hockey, Canada)
- 1924-25 C144 Champ's Cigarettes (Hockey, Canada)
- 1924-25 V130 Maple Crispette (Hockey, Canada)
- 1924-25 V145-2 William Patterson (Hockey, Canada)
- 1928-29 V128-2 Paulin's Candy (Hockey, Canada)
- 1933-34 V129 Anonymous (Hockey, Canada)
- 1933-34 V252 Canadian Gum (Hockey, Canada)
- 1933-34 V288 Hamilton Gum (Hockey, Canada)
- 1933-34 V304A O-Pee-Chee, Series A (Hockey, Canada)
- 1933-34 V304B O-Pee-Chee, Series A (Hockey, Canada)
- 1933-34 V357 World Wide Gum Ice Kings (Hockey, Canada)
- 1935-36 V304C O-Pee-Chee (Hockey, Canada)
- 1936-37 V304D O-Pee-Chee (Hockey, Canada)
- 1936-37 V356 World Wide Gum (Hockey, Canada)
- 1937-38 V304E O-Pee-Chee (Hockey, Canada)
- 1939-40 V301-1 O-Pee-Chee (Hockey, Canada)
- 1940-41 V301-2 O-Pee-Chee (Hockey, Canada)
