= T205 =

1911 baseball card set

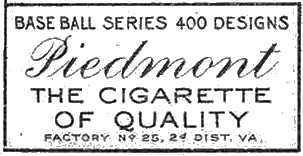
- Card back with a 'Piedmont' brand advertising
- Type: Baseball card
- Company: American Tobacco Company
- Country: United States
- Availability: 1911–1911
- Materials: Baseball players

The T205 was a baseball card set issued in 1911 by the American Tobacco Company through 11 different cigarette brands owned by it. The collection is considered a landmark set in the history of baseball card collecting.

== History ==
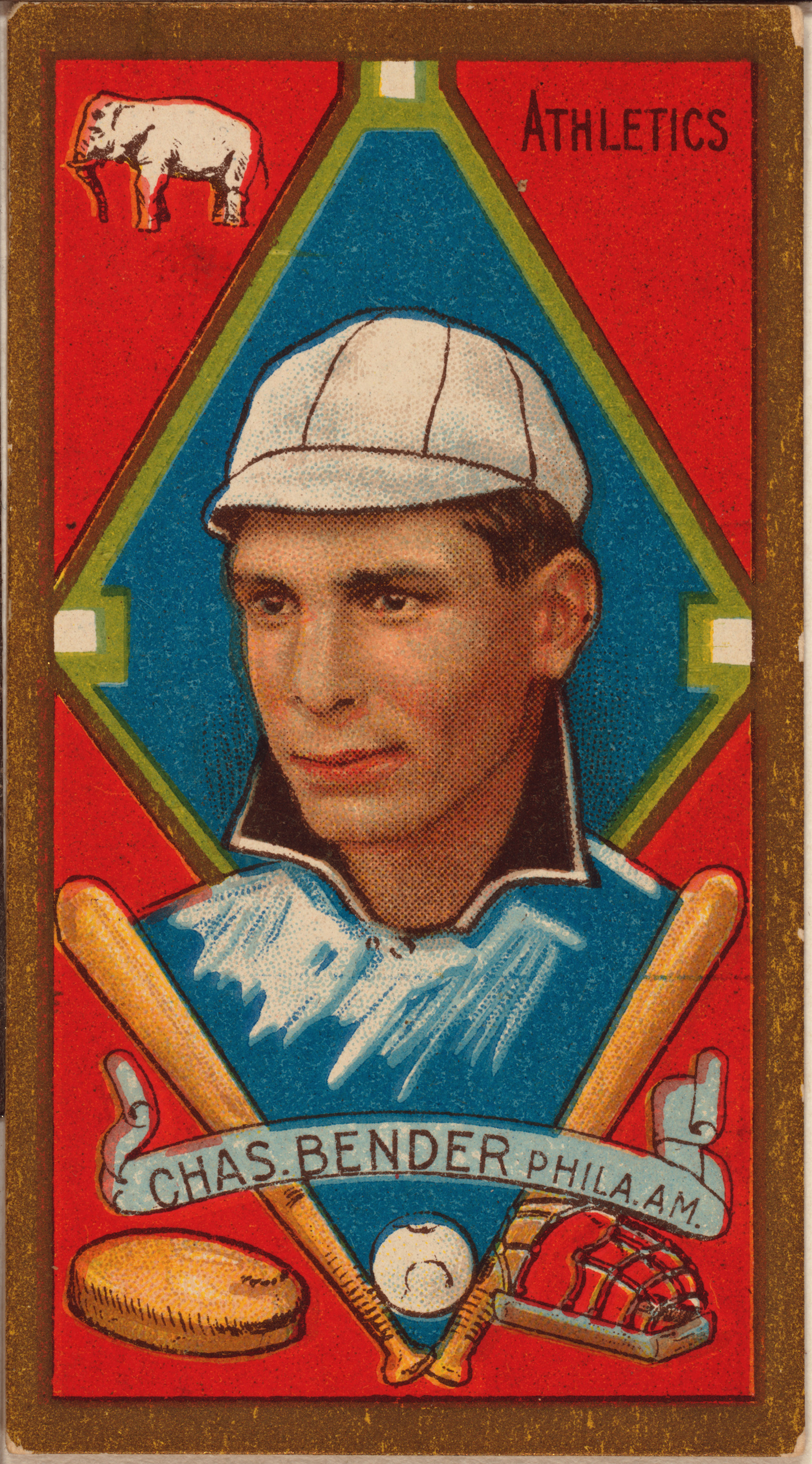
Chief Bender card. It featured a diamond surrounding the player (only in American League teams)

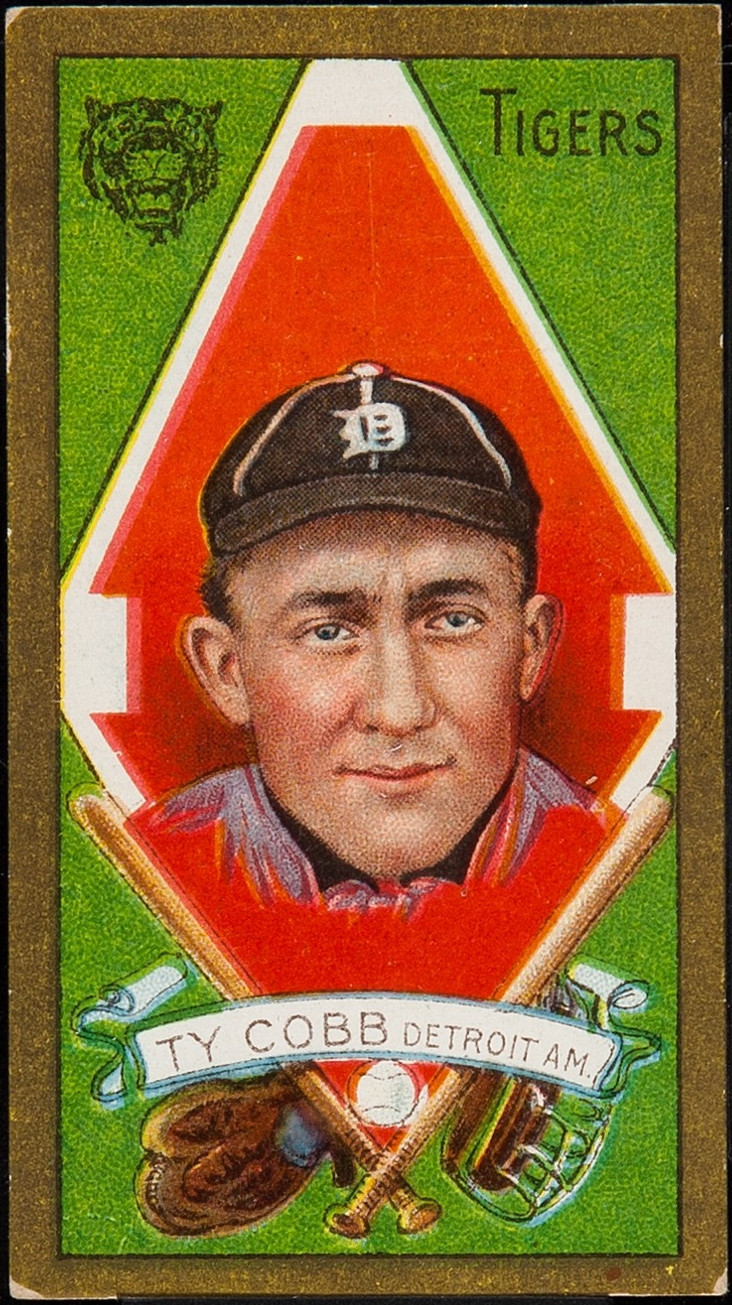
1911 T-205 Ty Cobb baseball card

The name T205 refers to the catalog designation assigned by Jefferson Burdick in his book The American Card Catalog. It is also known informally as the "Gold Borders" set due to the distinctive gold borders surrounding the lithographs on each card.

The T205 set consists of 221 cards, which include many variations and short prints. The set consists of three different leagues: the American, National, and Minor Leaguers. The American League can be identified by the baseball diamond surrounding the portrait of the player sporting their team logo near the top. The National League displays a simple colored background with the first-ever use of a facsimile autograph of the player. Minor Leaguers are made up of 12 cards printed with noticeably different and more detailed borders. The cards measure 1-7/16" x 2-5/8" which is considered by many collectors to be the standard tobacco card size.

The T205 set is one of the most popular sets of the tobacco/pre-war era, second only to T206. The large number of variations, number of stars, and colorful artwork give it enormous appeal to collectors. There are 27 Baseball Hall of Fame members in the set (in alphabetical order): Home Run Baker, Chief Bender, Roger Bresnahan, Mordecai Brown, Frank Chance, Fred Clarke, Ty Cobb, Eddie Collins, Hugh Duffy, Johnny Evers, Clark Griffith, Miller Huggins, Hughie Jennings, Walter Johnson, Addie Joss, Rube Marquard, Christy Mathewson, John McGraw, Tris Speaker, Joe Tinker, Bobby Wallace, Zack Wheat, Cy Young.

With a little effort, the set can be completed, apart from the most difficult cards to obtain: the elusive Hoblitzell no-stats card and the Mathewson Cycle Error (1 win).

== Brands marketed ==
T205 cards were issued with 17 different backs, representing the 11 different brands of cigarettes/tobacco with which the cards were issued. Due to the same card having different backs, there are actually far more than 220 "different" T205 cards.

Brands that commercialised T205 cards were:

- American Beauty
- Broad Leaf
- Cycle
- Drum
- Hassan
- Hindu
- Honest Long Cut
- Piedmont
- Polar Bear
- Sovereign
- Sweet Caporal

== Notes ==
The sports memorabilia community recently discovered an uncorrected error on Cycle brand cards of Hall of Fame pitcher Christy Mathewson. While his pitching record should (and typically does) read 37-11, on Cycle cards it is listed as 37-1. While it is difficult to determine rarity and value due to a lack of market data, the card is expected to be more common and less expensive than the Hoblitzell no-stats variation.
