= Jefferson Burdick =

Baseball and trading card collector and cataloguer

- Burdick with his collection
- Born: 25 February 1900; Central Square, New York, U.S.
- Died: 13 March 1963 (aged 63); New York, New York, U.S.
- Occupation: Collector
- Known for: Trading cards collector
- Notable work: The American Card Catalog

Jefferson R. Burdick (25 February 1900 – 13 March 1963) was an American electrician and a collector of printed ephemera, including postcards, posters, cigar bands, and other types of printed materials dating from the mid-nineteenth century to the early 1960s. He is best known for collecting trading and baseball cards in The American Card Catalog, otherwise known as the ACC.

Burdick is often considered to be the greatest card collector in history, and has been called "The Father of Card Collecting."

== Biography ==
=== Early life ===
He was born in Central Square, New York in 1900. Growing up on a farm, Burdick began collecting cards from soda and tobacco companies as a child, and asked his father to smoke different cigarette brands so he could collect them all. Burdick graduated from Central High School in 1918, and worked as a farm laborer with his family before attending Syracuse University in late 1920.

In 1922, he received a two-year business degree from Syracuse University. He held a variety of jobs after graduation, including working in advertising at The Syracuse Herald before becoming an electrician, which was his primary occupation. He developed arthritis during his thirties, which continued to affect him throughout his life.

=== Return to collection and publications ===
Burdick became interested in collecting again in 1933, when he began amassing cards and stamps in earnest. Beginning in 1937, he published a Card Collectors Bulletin. He established his system of cataloguing cards in the CCB. In total, he collected around 306,000 cards which he glued into 394 albums. The reasons why Burdick chose to glue his cards into albums is unknown, as he advised collectors to use corner mounting to preserve cards in the CCB. George Vrechek, in "Burdick Revisted", theorizes that Burdick chose glue to ensure that cards were not lost and the collection remained complete so that posterity could enjoy it.

By 1940, Burdick was living as a lodger with a Syracuse family and earned a salary of $1,065 per year as an assembler at Crouse-Hinds Company. Despite his meager wages, he continued to spend the majority of his earnings on publishing his bulletins and growing his collection.

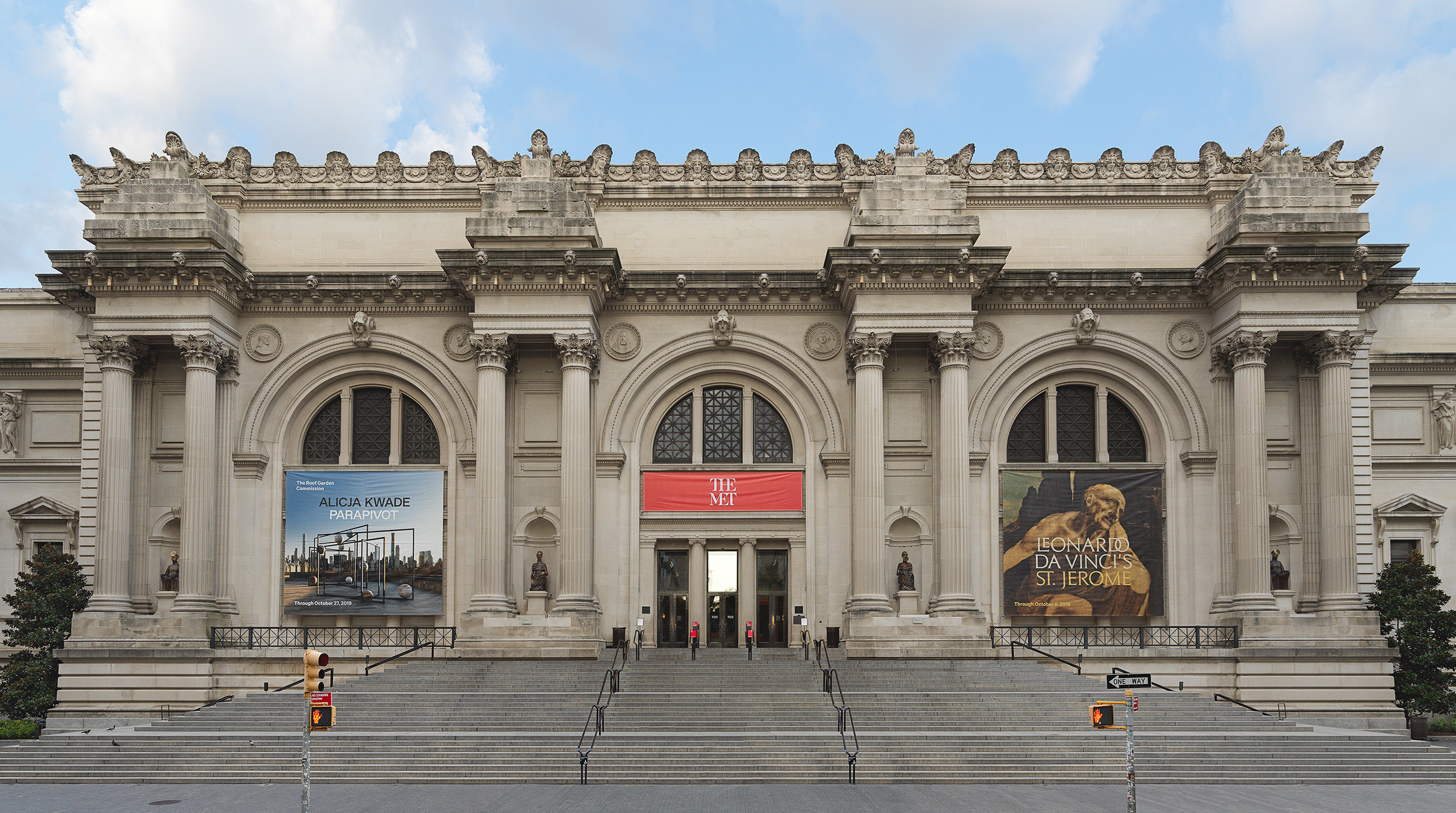
Burdick's collection was donated to the Metropolitan Museum of Art in New York City.

Burdick donated his entire collection to the Metropolitan Museum of Art in New York in 1947. Writing in 1948, he stated his belief that it should be "a national collection belonging to everybody." That year, he created a guide to the collection with art historian A. Hyatt Mayor that explains the background and organization of the collection.

=== Later life and continued work at the Met ===
He retired from Crouse-Hinds in 1959 due to disability, and moved to Madison Avenue where he could be closer to the Met. Burdick spent 15 years working at the museum's drawings and prints department to accomplish the task of cataloging the collection, which he finished in January 1963. He was hospitalized at Bellevue Hospital in 1962. He died the following year.

In 2018, Burdick was posthumously awarded the Henry Chadwick Award by the Society for American Baseball Research (SABR). SABR also created the "Jefferson Burdick Award for Contributions to the Hobby".

== The Burdick Collection ==
The Jefferson R. Burdick collection is the second largest public collection of baseball cards, behind only that of the National Baseball Hall of Fame and Museum. A small part of the collection is on display at the museum on the first floor of the American Wing. Burdick’s donation to the museum included over 300,000 items; however, only a small percentage of the items donated by Burdick were baseball cards.

The Burdick system is still widely used today by collectors and dealers of baseball memorabilia. The famed T206 baseball card set received its popularized name from the set's designation in the ACC. Many other baseball card sets are popularly known by their ACC designation, including: T205, E93, M116 and R313.
