= T206 =

Tobacco card set

- Type: Baseball card
- Invented by: American Tobacco Company
- Company: American Tobacco Company (1909–11); Topps (2002–present)
- Country: United States

T206 is a tobacco card set issued from 1909 to 1911 in cigarette and loose tobacco packs through 16 different brands owned by the American Tobacco Company. It is a landmark set in the history of baseball card collecting, due to its size and rarity, and the quality of its color lithographs. The first series of cards were issued beginning in 1909. From 1909 to 1911 cards of over 500 major minor-league players in 16 different cigarette brands. The set featured Honus Wagner, Eddie Plank and the error cards of Larry Doyle and Sherry Magee. Several of the cards are among the most expensive sports cards ever sold.

In 2002, nearly 100 years after the original T206 cards were created, Topps rebooted the brand with Topps 206. The set paid tribute to the original T206 design and artwork, leaning heavily on nostalgic elements. Topps has released several collections of 206 cards over the years, including the first wave of its 2023 series (the “Low Series”). Each pack is filled with star athletes, retired legends, and talented rookies including rare parallels, image variations and limited-edition autographs.

== Overview ==
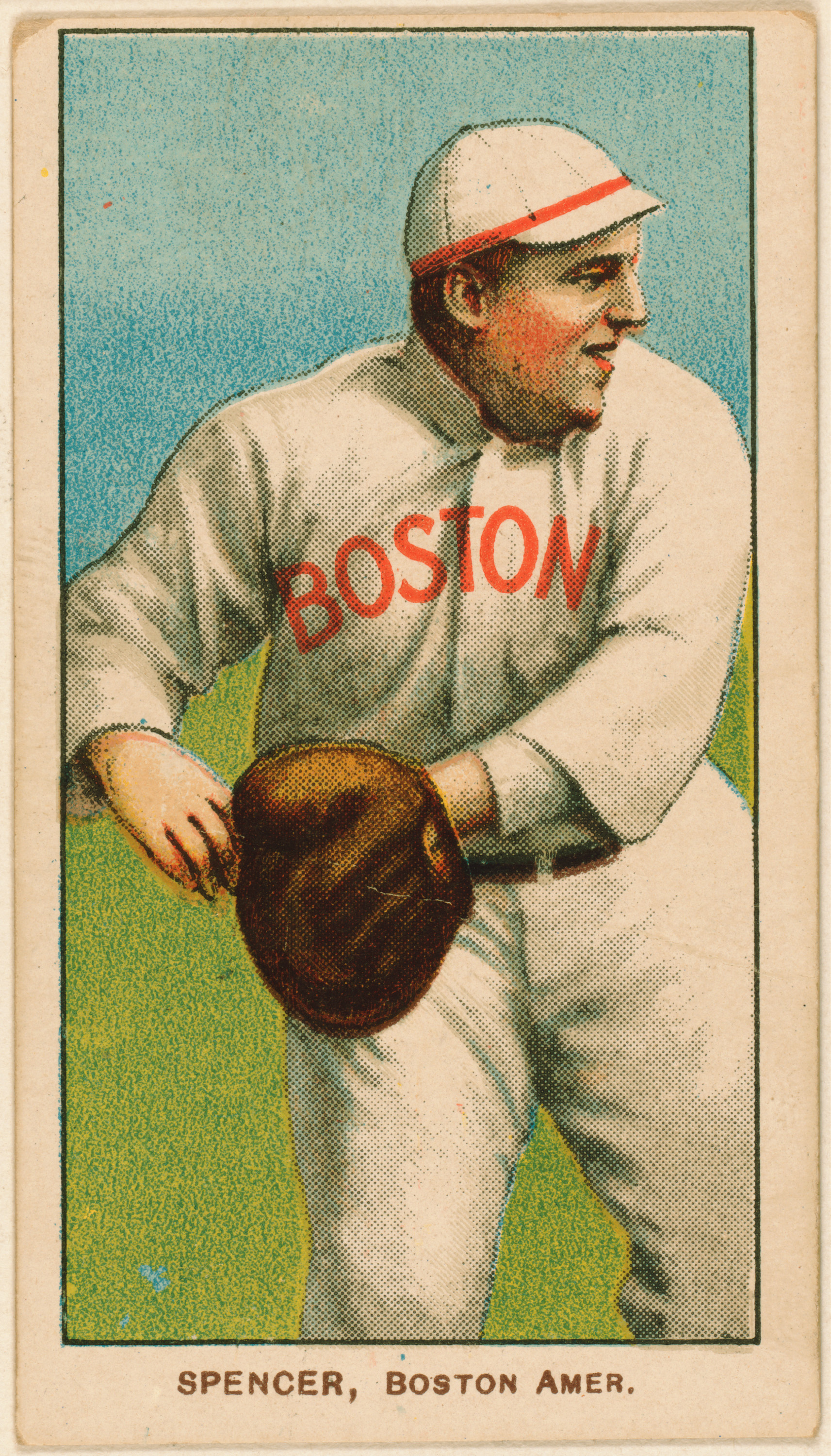
T206 card displaying Boston Red Sox player Tubby Spencer

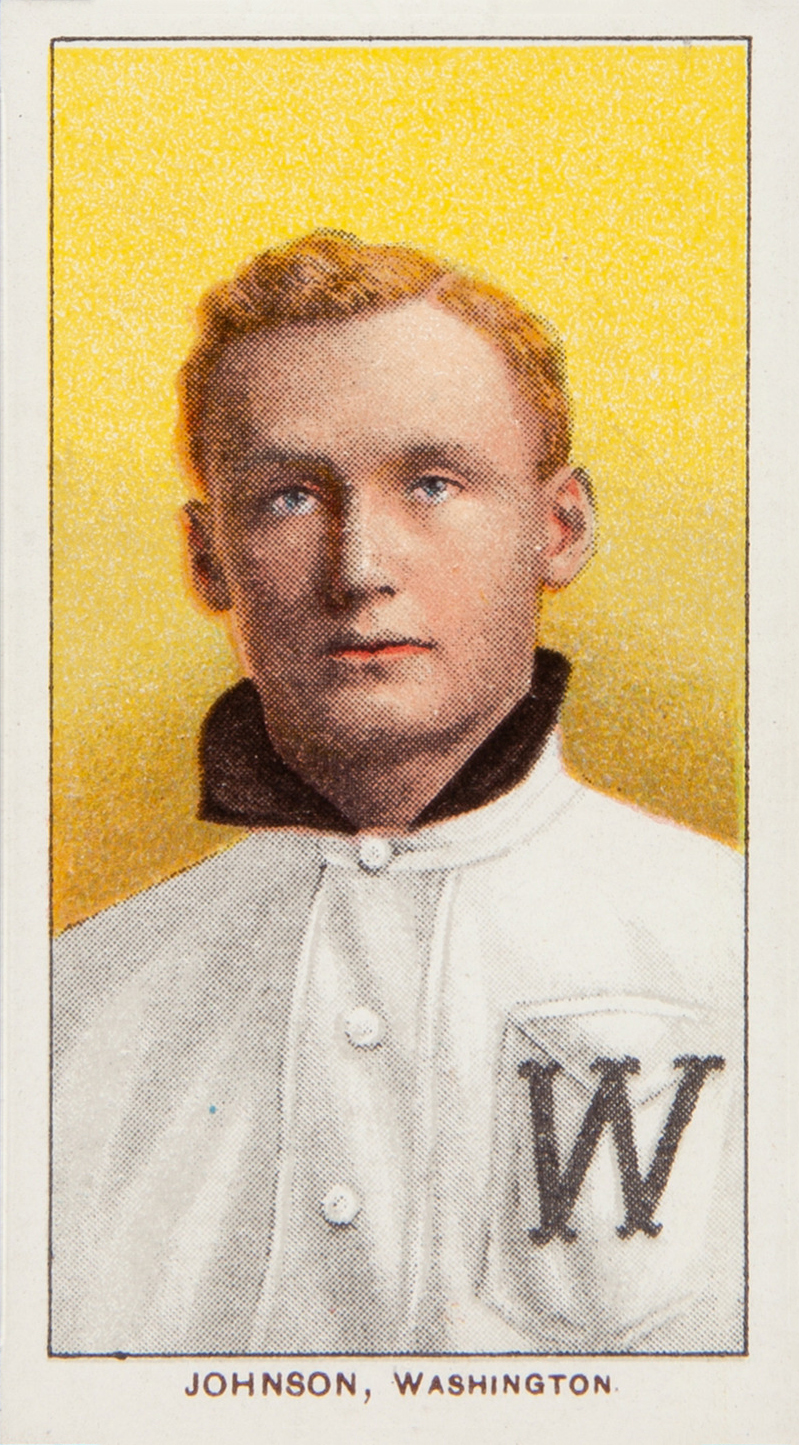
T-206 Walter Johnson

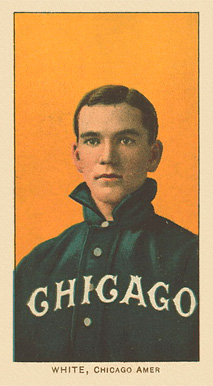
T206 Doc White

The name T206 refers to the catalog designation assigned by Jefferson Burdick in his book The American Card Catalog. It is also known informally as the "White Border" set due to the distinctive white borders surrounding the lithographs on each card.

The T206 set consists of 524 cards. Over 100 of the cards picture minor league players. There are also multiple cards for the same player in different poses, different uniforms, or even with different teams after being traded (since the set was issued over a period of three years). The cards measure 1 7/16 by 2 5/8 inches (3.7 cm × 6.7 cm) which is considered by many collectors to be the standard tobacco card size.

The T206 set is one of the most popular and widely collected sets of the tobacco/pre-war era. The historical significance of the set as well as the large number of variations give it enormous appeal to collectors. In addition, the set features many Baseball Hall of Fame members including Ty Cobb (who is pictured on four different cards), Walter Johnson, Cy Young, and Christy Mathewson. The value of the cards has led to a great deal of counterfeiting over the years.

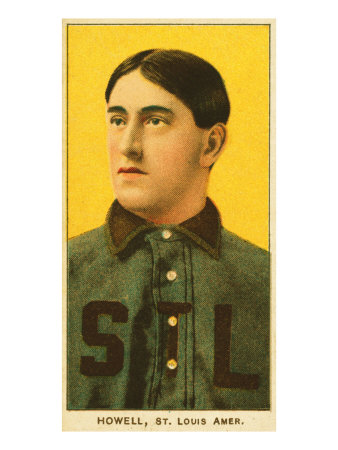
T206 Harry Howell

== Honus Wagner card ==
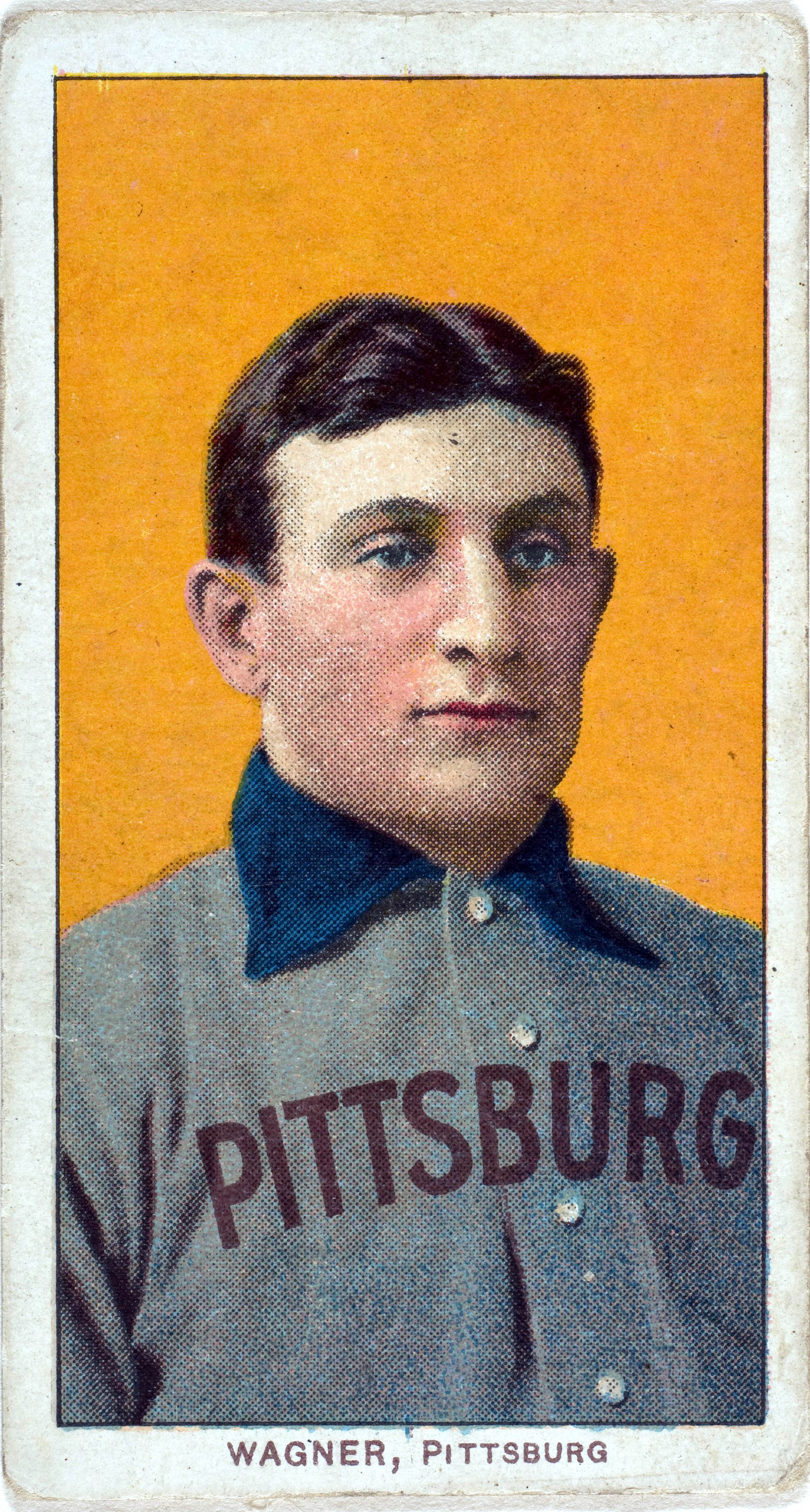
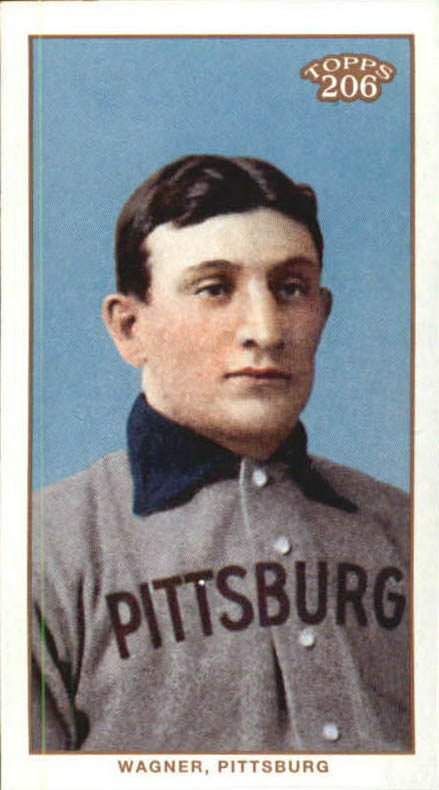
The original Honus Wagner card (left) released in 1909, reissued by Topps in 2002 with blue background (right)

The T206 Wagner is considered one of the most valuable baseball cards in existence, and even damaged examples are valued at $100,000 or more. This is in part because of Wagner's status as an original Hall of Fame inductee. It is one of the scarcest cards from the T206 set. It is estimated that fewer than 50 copies of this card made it into circulation.

=== Rarity ===
While the American Tobacco Trust, over three years and sixteen brands of cigarettes, distributed "tens or hundreds of thousands" of T206 cards for any given player, it is estimated that only between 50 and 200 Wagner cards were ever distributed to the public, and fewer still have survived to the present day. Several theories exist as to why the card is so rare. One theory is that the printing plate used to create Wagner's card broke early on in the production process, but Wagner was a major star at the time and new plates would almost certainly have been created. Another theory is that there was a copyright dispute between the American Tobacco Company and the artist who created the Wagner lithograph.

The most commonly accepted theory is that the card was pulled from production because Wagner himself objected to the production of the card, but his motivation is unclear. Reports at the time indicated Wagner did not wish to associate himself with cigarettes, possibly because he did not want to encourage children to smoke. However, some collectors and historians have pointed out that Wagner, a user of chewing tobacco, allowed his image to appear on cigar boxes and other tobacco-related products prior to 1909 and may have objected to the card simply because he wanted more financial compensation for the use of his image.

=== Value ===
A high-quality example of the Wagner card was sold at auction on eBay in 2000 for US$1.265 million. In February 2007, the same card was sold for a record US$2.35 million.

In September 2007, the Wagner card changed hands again when SCP Auctions of Mission Viejo, California, which had bought minority ownership, brokered a new sale—this time for US$2.8 million, to a private collector. On August 1, 2008, noted memorabilia dealer John Rogers of North Little Rock, Arkansas paid US$1.6 million for a Professional Sports Authenticator 5MC (miscut) Wagner. Rogers stated he "was prepared to go much higher and is pleased with his investment." He added "the citizens of Arkansas deserve to see this treasure and I intend to make the card available to the public." In November 2010, a group of nuns from Baltimore sold a Wagner card for $262,000 in auction to Doug Walton, a sporting card store owner.

In April 2013, a T206 "jumbo" Wagner, so-called because it measured slightly larger than most other known examples, sold at auction for $2.1 million, reported to be a record price for the card. That record was broken in October 2016 when the card was sold at auction for $3.12 million.

In May 2021, a Wagner from a private collection sold for $3.75 million at auction, again setting a new sales record for the card.

In August 2022, a Wagner sold for $7.25 million, another record for the card.

In 2002, nearly 100 years after the original T206 cards were created, Topps rebooted the brand with Topps 206. The set paid tribute to the original T206 design and artwork, leaning heavily on nostalgic elements. Topps has released several collections of 206 cards over the years, including the first wave of its 2023 series (the “Low Series”). Each pack is filled with star athletes, retired legends, and talented rookies including rare parallels, image variations and limited-edition autographs.

The iconic Honus Wagner card was reissued by Topps in 2002, with variations on its background color. The card was printed with the original 1909 orange color, and also in blue (#307). In 2020, a new Honus Wagner card was issued by the company (#45) as part of the second wave (of 5) released that year.

== Brands commercialized ==
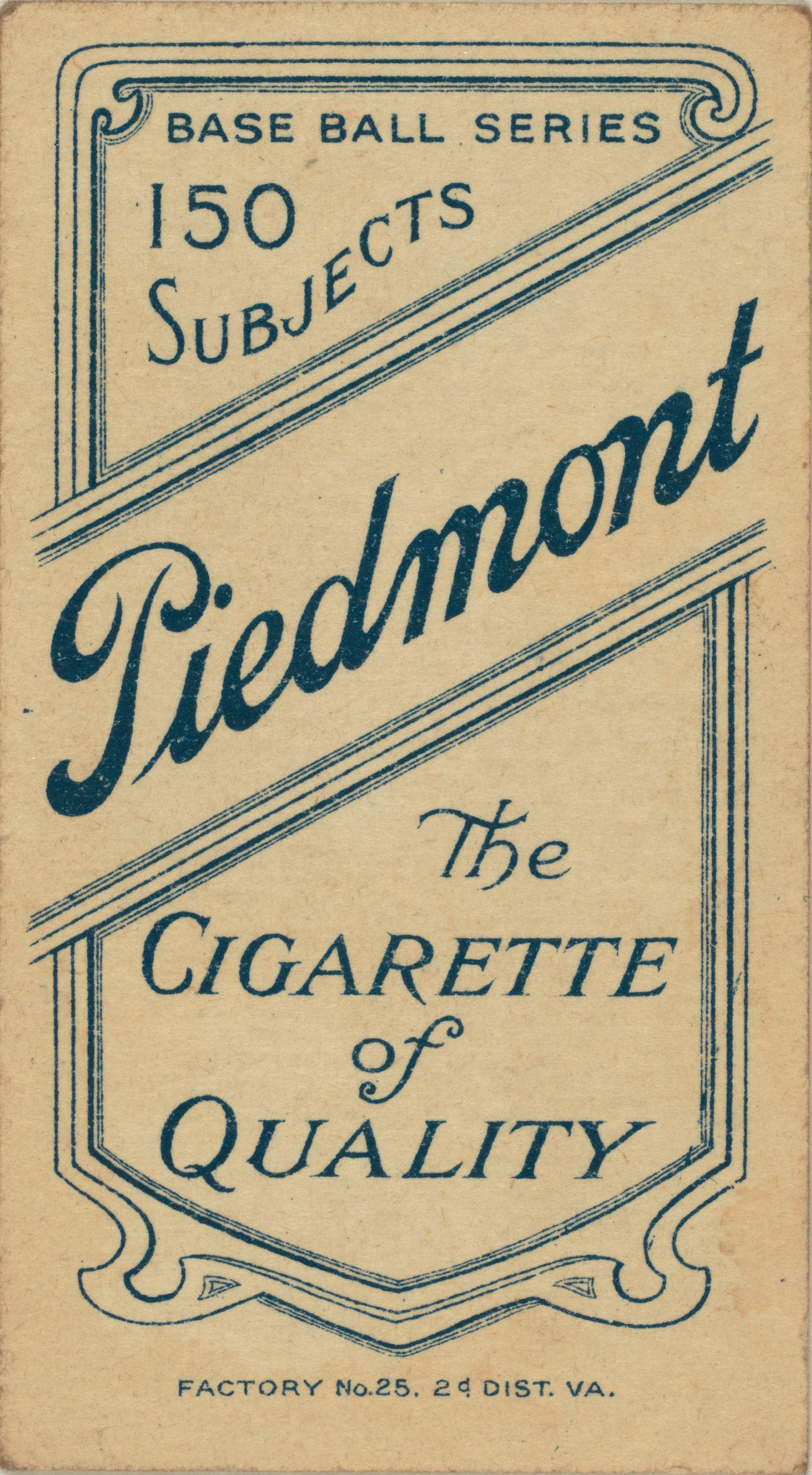
Reverse of a T206 card issued under the 'Piedmont cigarettes' brand

T206 cards were issued with 16 different backs, representing the 16 different brands of cigarettes/tobacco with which the cards were issued. Due to the same card having different backs, there are actually far more than 524 "different" T206 cards. The actual number of front/back combination is not fully known as collectors still discover new combinations from time to time. The 16 backs are:

- American Beauty (Note: more thinly cut than other brands due to the narrower size of the cigarette packs)
- Broadleaf
- Carolina Brights
- Cycle
- Drum
- El Principe de Gales
- Hindu (Note: found in both brown ink and red ink (rare))
- Lenox (Note: found in both black and (rarely) brown ink)
- Old Mill (Note: found in black and, very rarely, brown inks. A single example of a blue backed Old Mill is known.)
- Piedmont
- Polar Bear (Note: only brand that is not cigarettes; Polar Bear was loose tobacco, also known as scrap tobacco)
- Sovereign
- Sweet Caporal
- Tolstoi
- Ty Cobb (Note: not highly regarded as a T206 back as it is only found with a single image front.)
- Uzit
- Blank (Note: unprinted backs appear infrequently but are likely printing anomalies)

== Topps revival ==
The 206 name has been revived by Topps (under the "Topps 206" brand) a total three times, the first in 2002 with a second revival in 2010. Again in 2020, the company released a new collection divided into five different series, with the first (50 cards) being released in May 2020. The collection, named "Topps 206", include players from both, Major and Minor League. The 5th series was released in September 2020.
