= 面子 =

面子 may refer to:

- Mianzi, a Chinese word referring to a Chinese cultural concept of face
- Menko, a Japanese card game played by two or more players
