= James Beckett (statistician) =

American statistician

James Beckett III (born May 10, 1949) is an American statistician, author, editor, and publisher. His publications are well known in the hobby of sports card collecting. Beckett earned a Ph.D. degree in statistics at Southern Methodist University in 1975 and then joined the faculty of Bowling Green State University as an associate professor.

== Sports card industry ==
While at Bowling Green, Beckett began preparing baseball card price guides, which he offered free upon request.

Beckett price guides, first published in 1979, rely upon information from sellers throughout the United States, who supply information on customer interest and sales of products. Price guides typically carry two value labels, one based upon a high value, the other denoting low values. As the condition of collectibles is important in ascertaining their value, Beckett price guides also typically include a series of definitions for estimating condition.

In November 1984, Beckett began publishing Beckett Baseball Card Monthly. (Rival publication Tuff Stuff was also founded that year.) Beckett Baseball Card Monthly grew in popularity and became the basis for the success of Beckett Media, now based in Dallas, Texas. Beckett Publications produces price guides for a variety of sports collectibles (Beckett's Football, Basketball, and Hockey guides would start in the early 1990s, with Beckett's monthly Racing Guide following in 1996). Market values for non-sports card collectibles such as Pokémon Cards and related products are also tracked. Beckett retains a position as Senior Advisor for Beckett Media, but is no longer Editor/Publisher as he was during the 1980s and 1990s.

The publishing company became the leading publisher of sports and entertainment market collectible guides and was acquired by Apprise Media in 2005.

== Personal life ==
Beckett has three children from his first marriage. He is married to the former Diane Burgdorf, daughter of a Dallas car dealer and ex-wife of Sir Mark Thatcher. From time to time, Beckett attends some of the most prominent sports card and collectibles conventions held in various U.S. cities and is considered a celebrity within the industry.

== Sources ==
- Beckett Fact Sheet
- "About the Author," Dr. James Beckett, et al., eds., Beckett Almanac of Baseball Cards and Collectibles, Number 8 (Dallas: Beckett Publications, 2003), pg. 10.
