= Alan Rosen =

American sports collectibles dealer (1943–2013)

Alan "Mr. Mint" Rosen (February 11, 1946 – January 24, 2013) was an American sports collectibles dealer who was especially active in the 1980s and 1990s. He advertised heavily and was a fixture at card conventions. Eventually organizers would give him a table or booth in a prime location for free because they knew he would boost attendance. In a July 4, 1988, Sports Illustrated article, Dan Geringer called him the "King of Cards" in the "high-stakes baseball card game". In 1986, he was offered and purchased the "1952 Topps Find" of baseball cards, considered one of the greatest finds ever in the hobby. He also sold nine T206 Honus Wagner baseball cards over the course of his career.

== The Find ==
In the spring of 1986, Rosen received a telephone call from a David Espinosa, a forklift operator who told him about a truck driver named Ted Lodge. Lodge had a 1952 Topps baseball card collection he might be willing to sell. Rosen spoke to Lodge several times over the phone; each time, Lodge admitted to having more and more highly desirable cards. Rosen was very skeptical, but flew out to the Boston area to check it out, taking with him at least $100,000 in cash and hiring an armed policeman for protection. The collection had belonged to Lodge's late father; the cards had been stored in the attic for decades and forgotten. Rosen found the cards to be plentiful, genuine and very valuable; for around 5500 cards, Rosen claims he paid upwards of $125,000, which included a finder's fee and the policeman's pay. It took several weeks to sell piecemeal, but the collection grossed $475,000, according to Rosen.

Rosen sold an ungraded Mickey Mantle card (one of 75 in the collection) quickly for $1000, then bought it back for $40,000 in 1991 and flipped it to Anthony Giordano for $50,000 that same year. Supposedly at the insistence of his sons, Giordano had it graded decades later; it was rated a 9.5 by SGC. (There are three other cards graded 10 by SGC rival Professional Sports Authenticator [PSA], but Heritage Auctions, which sold the record-breaking card, stated "To those who accurately report that there are three PSA Gem Mint 10 examples of this card, we can only ask you to bring them out and put them side-by-side with this SGC Mint+ 9.5 and its '1985 Rosen Find - Finest Known Example' header.) In August 2022, it was sold at auction for a record price, not only for a card, but also for any sports item or memorabilia: $12.6 million, including buyer's premium.

== Books ==
He wrote or co-wrote two books on the field, including Mr. Mint's Insider's Guide to Investing in Baseball Cards and Collectibles and True Mint: Mr Mint's Price & Investment Guide to True Mint Baseball Cards.
