= Andrew Peck (businessman) =

American businessman

- Born: October 15, 1836
- Died: March 21, 1918 (aged 81)
- Occupation: Businessman
- Known for: Founding Peck & Snyder

Andrew Peck (October 15, 1836 – March 21, 1918) was an American businessman who founded Peck & Snyder, a purveyor of sporting goods, in 1866. The company is considered to have been one of the earliest baseball card distributors in America.

== Biography ==
=== Early life ===
Andrew Peck was born in New York City on October 15, 1836. He had no memory of his mother, who died when he was very young. His father left him at the Protestant Half Orphan Asylum when he was five years old, and afterwards died. Peck was then transferred to the Leake and Watts Orphan House. He apprenticed to a shopkeeper in Sharon Springs, New York at the age of fourteen, where he worked for almost two years. He moved out because of "cruel treatment" and sought to support himself independently.

He travelled throughout New York state during his late teens, often finding work at general stores before being employed at Fisher and Bro. Publishing House. During this time, he joined the Eagles Baseball Club, where he met his close friend Henry Chadwick. At the beginning of the American Civil War, Peck enlisted with the Union Army. He served with the Army of the Potomac, which was known for its love of baseball. He served in the army for the duration of the war.

=== Peck & Snyder ===
Peck returned to New York in 1865, where he began selling baseball equipments and games as a street vendor. He was one of the first baseball equipment vendors in New York, and one of only six major baseball equipment vendors in the city in the 1860s. Chadwick would visit daily to encourage Peck, and his business soon grew. In 1866, he went into business with W. Irving Snyder, founding Peck & Snyder Base Ball and Sportsman's Emporium. In addition to producing some of the earliest baseball bats, baseballs and caps, the company also sold the first canvas tennis shoes. It has been credited with creating the first baseball cards, but there were in fact earlier baseball trading cards produced by sporting goods companies. The company was later bought out by A.G. Spalding. He remained actively involved with the business, which was then under the Spalding umbrella, until 1889.

=== Later life and death ===
During the 1880s, Peck also made several trips to Europe where he became interested in various sports. He tried to encourage interest in European sports such as golf and tennis in the United States, building the first three tennis courts in America. By the end of his life, Peck was involved in several companies in the Tri-state area, and owned considerable real estate in Brooklyn. He was a noted collector of literature, owning the finest collection of Masonic literature in the United States.

He died of natural causes on March 21, 1918.
