= Utagawa Yoshifuji =

Japanese painter

Utagawa Yoshifuji (Japanese: 歌川芳藤, real name Nishimura Tōtarō (Japanese: 西村藤太郎); 1828–1887) was a Japanese ukiyo-e master of the late Edo and early Meiji periods.

== Career ==
Yoshifuji was a pupil of Utagawa Kuniyoshi of the Utagawa school. He became known for omocha-e prints made for children.

== Artworks ==
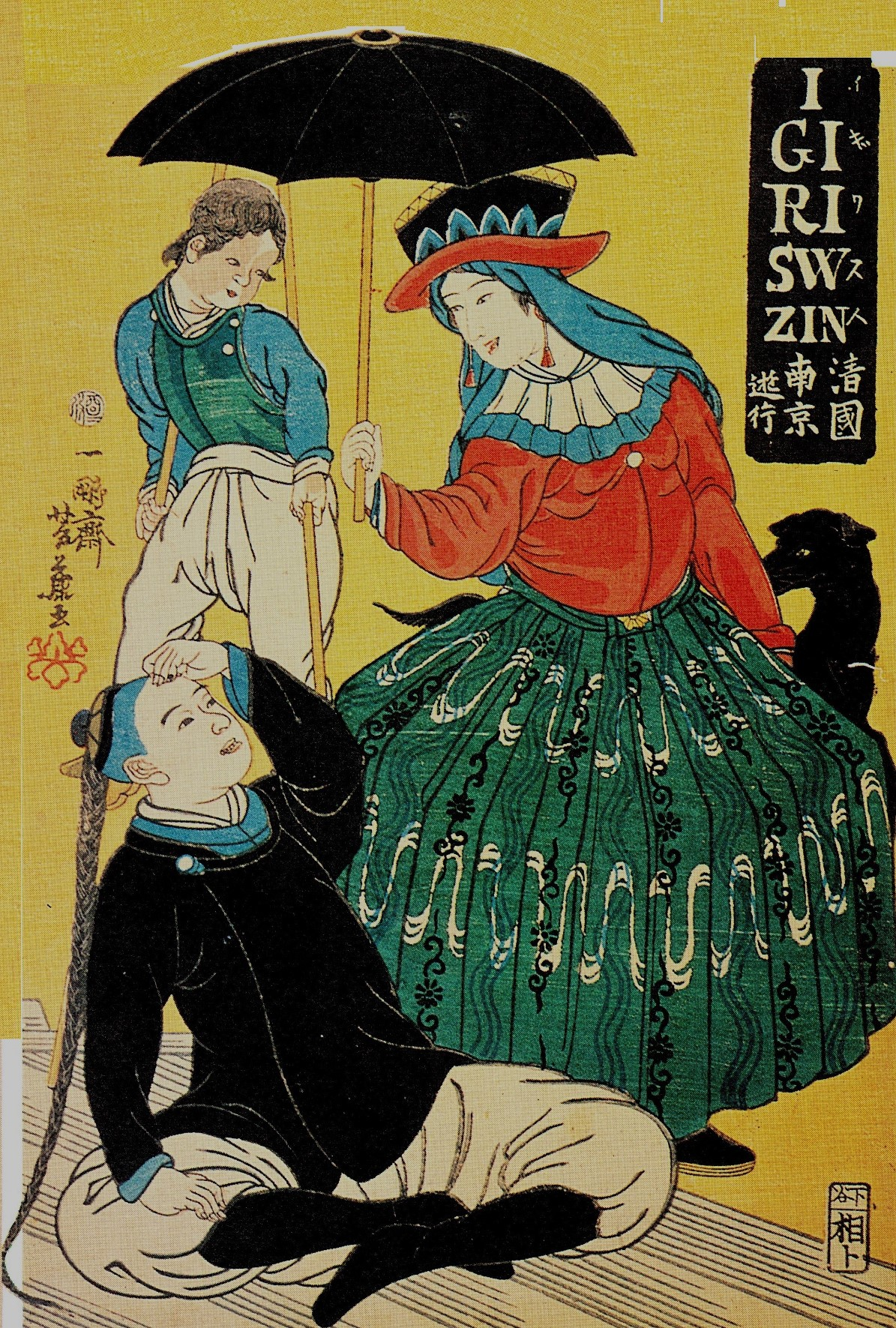
"Englishman", Yokohama-e style

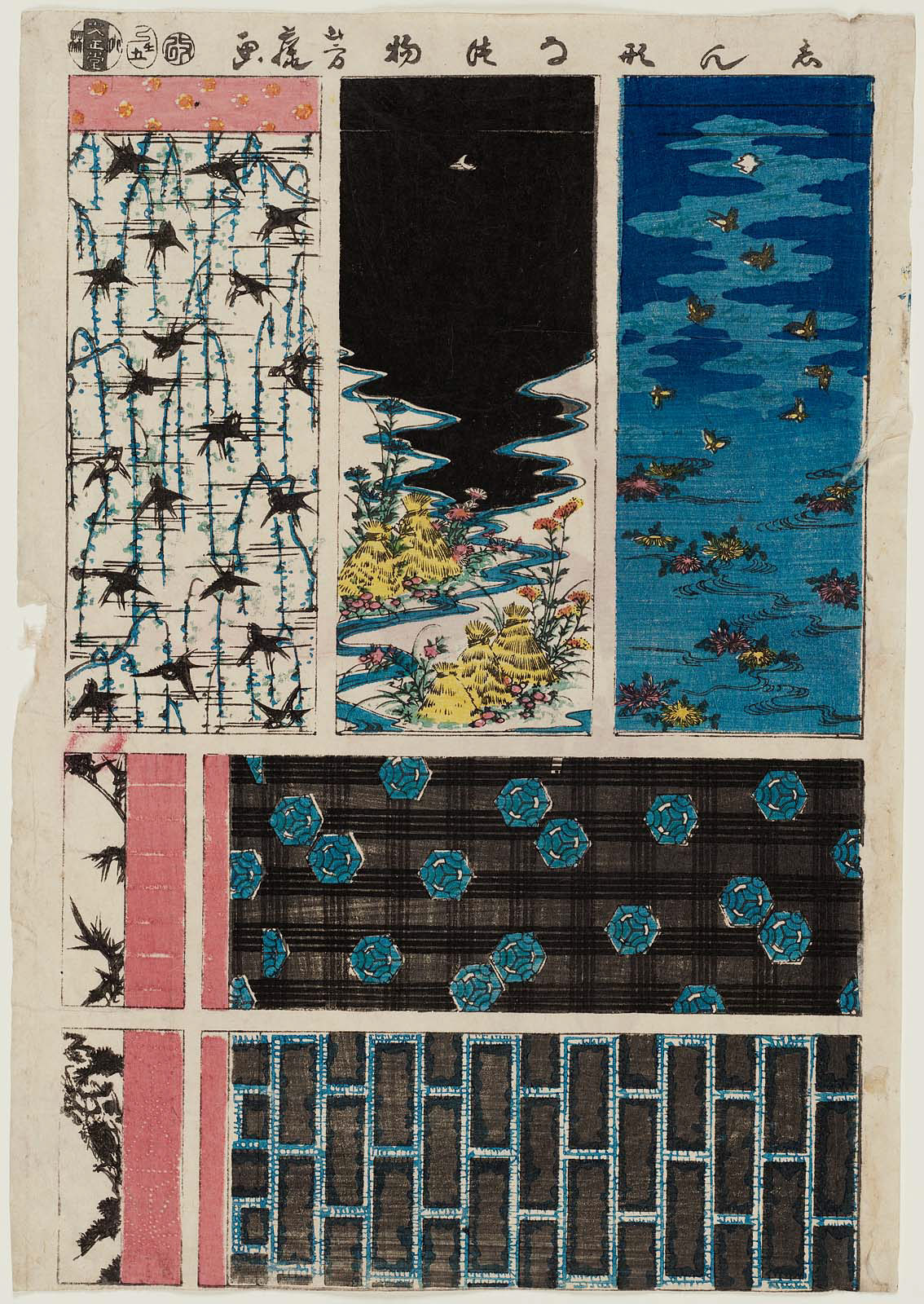
New Patterns for Summer Costumes, omocha-e style

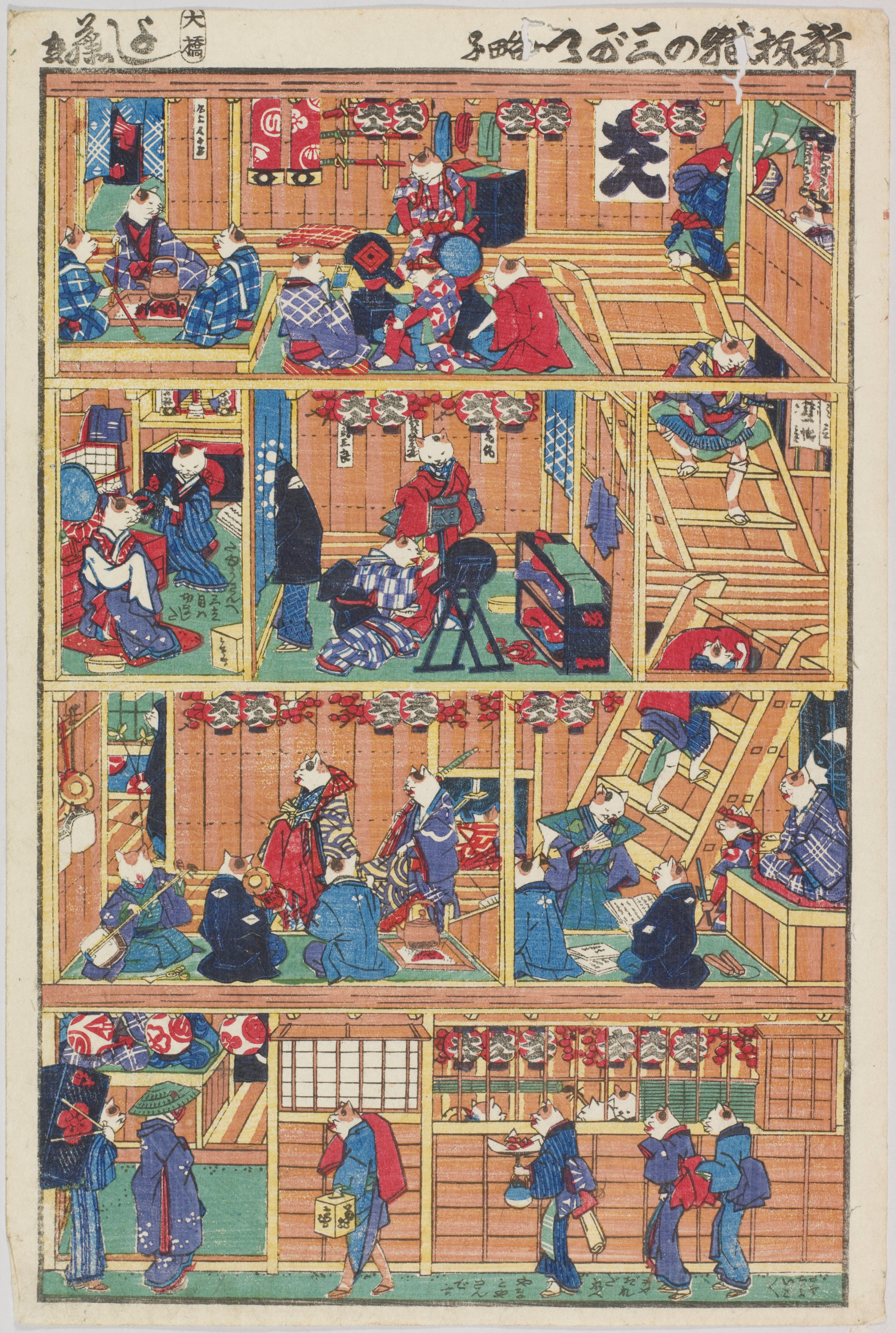
Cats in backstage at Kabuki theater

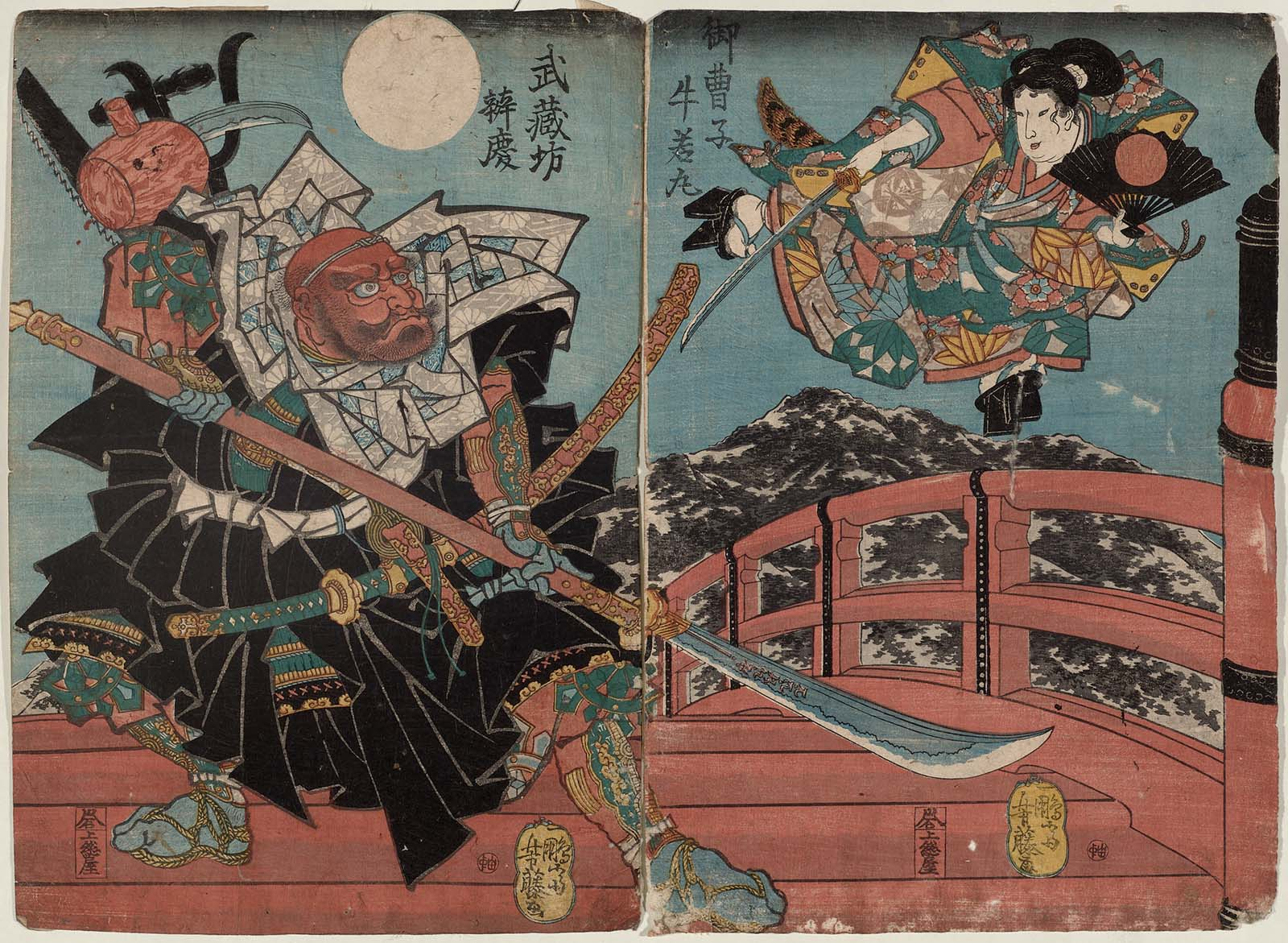
Onzôshi Ushiwakamaru and Musashibô Benkei on Gojô Bridge

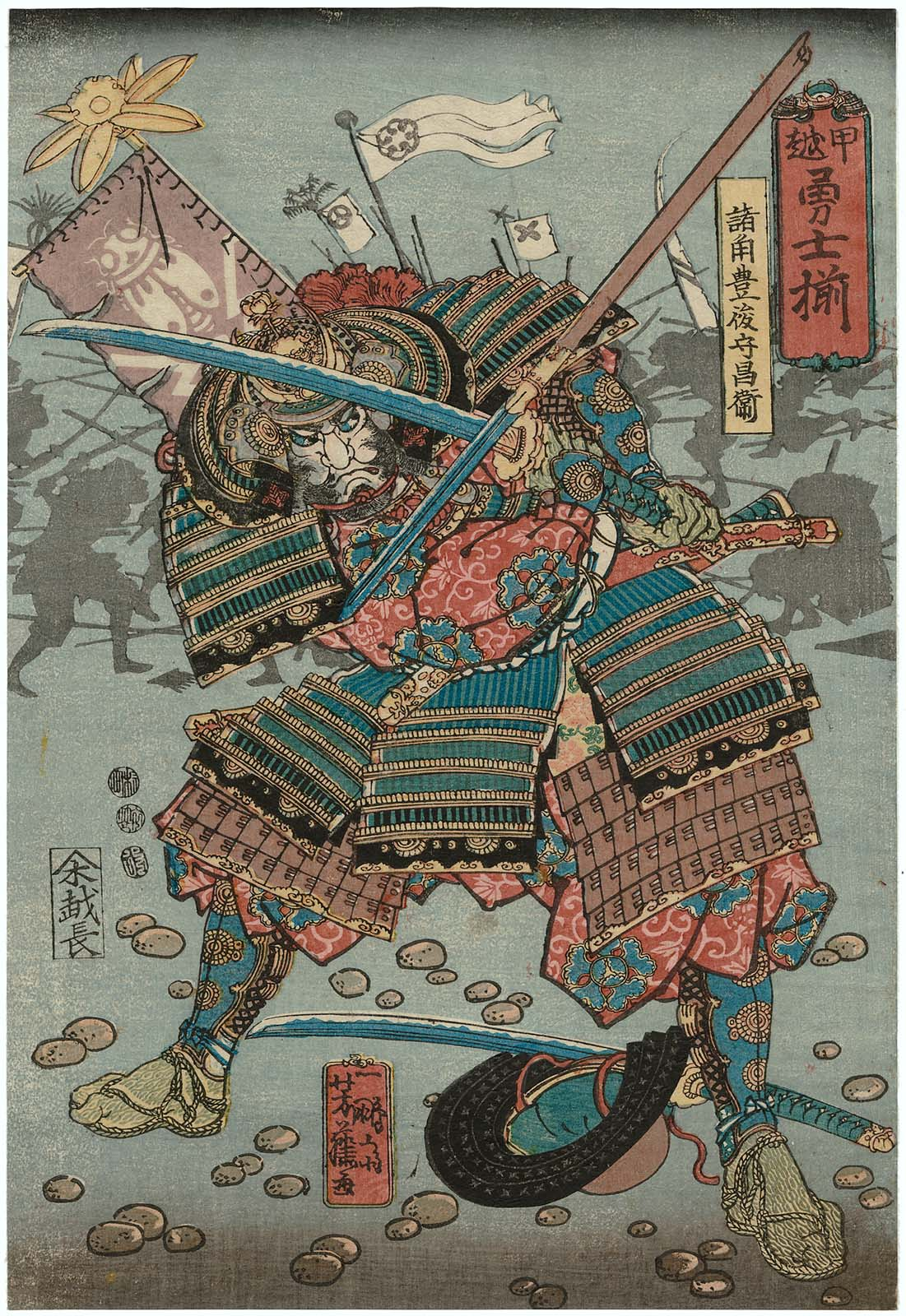
Morozumi Bungo no kami Masamori, from the series Valiant Warriors of Echigo and Kai

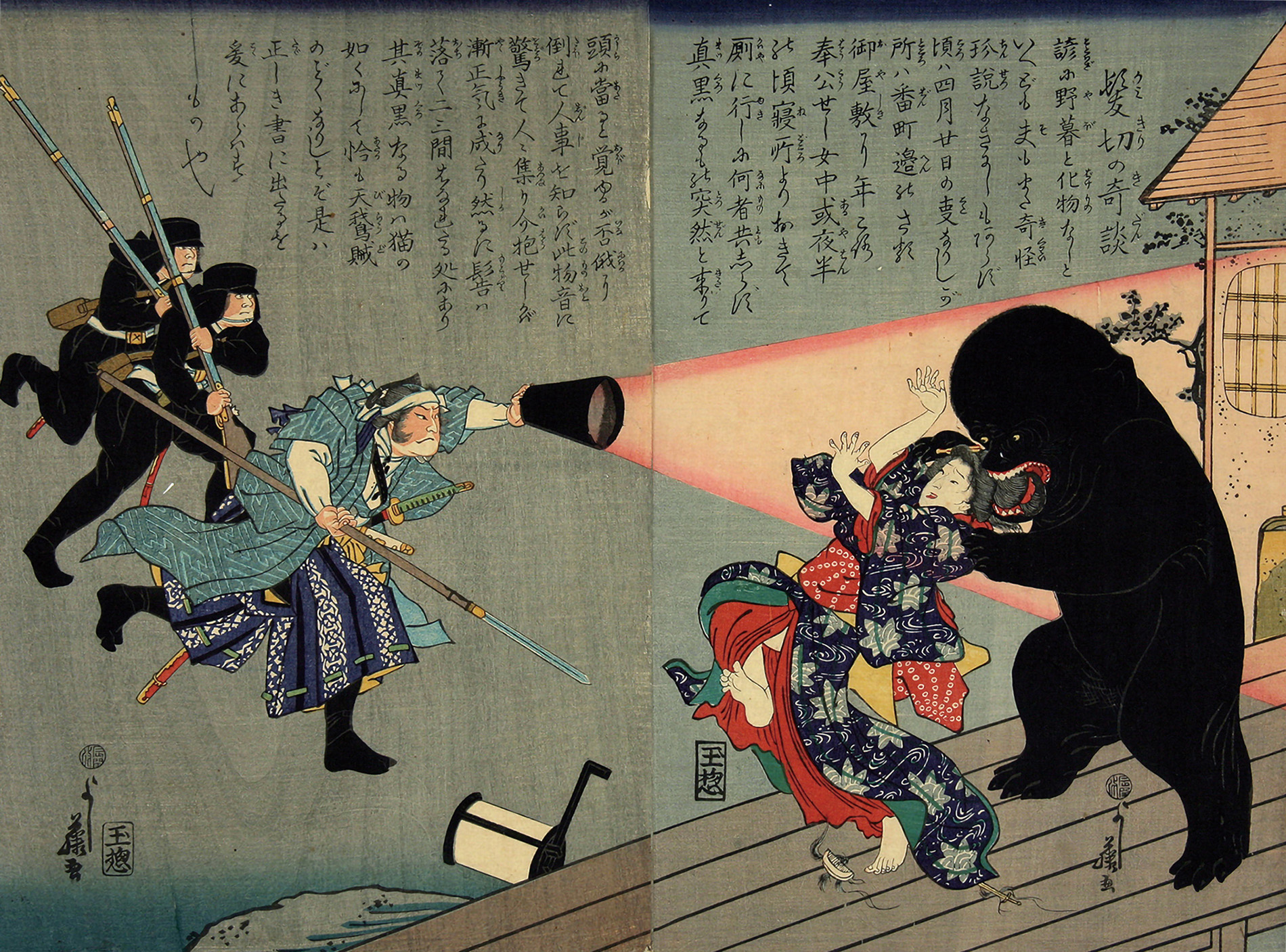
Kamikiri no Kidan (髪切りの奇談), "Hair-Cutting (Yokai) Strange Story" (1868)
