= Baseball menko =

Japanese baseball cards

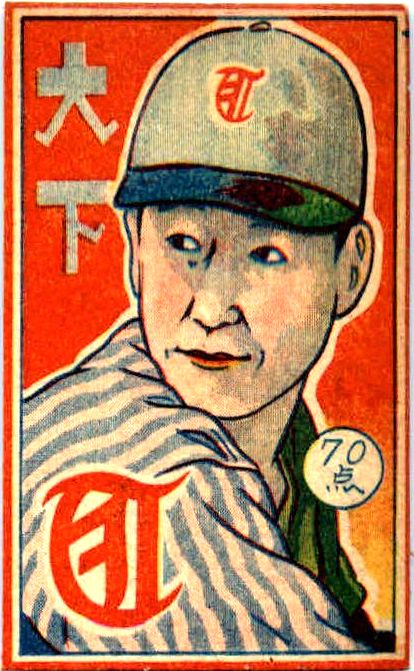
- Example of a menko card, c. 1948
- Type: Trading cards
- Company: Various
- Country: Japan
- Availability: 1897–present
- Features: Baseball players

Baseball menko are an early type of Japanese baseball cards, originally designed for use in the children's game of menko, but now avidly collected by baseball fans and card collectors. The word "menko" is used in both the singular and the plural form.

== History ==
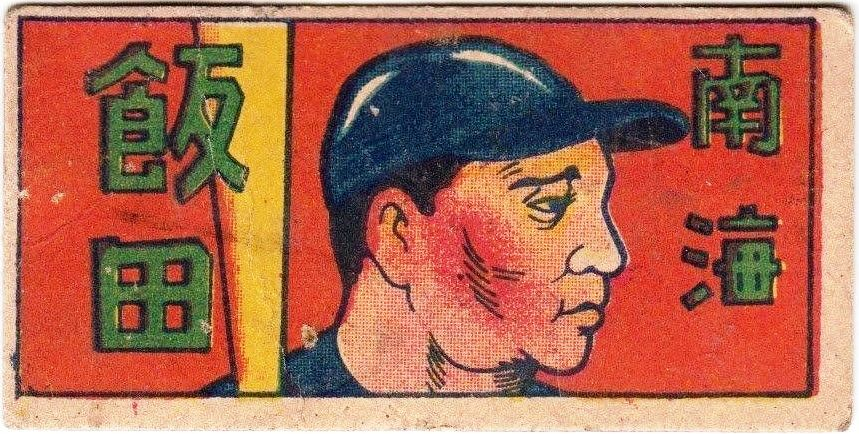
Tokuji Iida displayed on a 1948 menko baseball

The earliest known baseball menko, a generic baseball player, was from 1897. The menko card set in Gary Engel's Japanese Baseball Card Checklist and Price Guide is from 1929, depicting black and white (or sepia) images of Big Six University players. They are called the "1929 Nichieido Seika B&W Photo Bookmark Menko."

Interest in the sport of baseball was promoted by the visit of the 1934 All-Stars that include many prominent players such as Babe Ruth, Lou Gehrig, Jimmy Foxx, and Charlie Gehringer. At first, menkos displayed unnamed players, generic cards that would be later replaced by menkos depicting popular colleges, high schools and then professional players.

Another highlight in the history of Japanese cards came in 1945 when Japan lost World War II and General Douglas MacArthur banned traditional Japanese heroes. Therefore soldiers and samurais were removed from the menkos, being replaced by Japanese baseball stars and sumo wrestlers as "hero figures". In the 1950s, the popularization of television and the broadcasting of local games (with the Tokyo Giants and the Hanshin Tigers as some of the most representative teams) spread the popularity of the sport (and its merchandising) in the country.

== Shapes ==
Baseball menko exist in three shape categories: round, die-cut, and rectangular, and in a variety of sizes. The earliest die-cut and round menko sets cataloged by Engel are from 1947.

=== Diecut ===
The "1947 Diecut Menko" are 1 3/8 inches (35 mm) wide by 2 3/4 inches (70 mm) high, with color caricatures of six NPB players, including star players Tetsuharu Kawakami and Hiroshi Ohshita (Oshita). The backs each contain: 1. A paper/stone/scissors symbol, 2. The player's family name in kanji, 3. The player's team nickname in katakana, 4. A line drawing of a generic baseball player, 5. A 5- or 6-digit number.

=== Round ===
The "1947 Red or Blue Borders" round menko were 1 7/8 inches (48 mm) in diameter, with cartoon-like players on the front and blank backs. The team name in English, an arithmetic addition or subtraction, and the player name and sometimes position in kanji were also on the front.

== Other baseball cards ==
There are a wide variety of Japanese baseball cards that are not called "menko", including bromides (blank-backed photos originally made with silver bromide paper); cards packaged with food, candy, and gum; game cards, including Karuta and Takara cards.

In the 1970s and 1980s, some companies produced and marketed baseball cards in Japan, some of them were the Takara Company (which produced the highly successful baseball sets, although it did not renew production the following years due to poor sales), and the Calbee Corporation (which inserted baseball cards to its potato chips packs). Calbee started commercialising cards in 1973, having released several collections since then. By 2012, Calbee had marketed over 1 billion cards. Calbee is regarded as the first company to consistently produce an annual set in Japan. Other manufacturing companies are Yamakatsu, NST/Mr. Baseball, Lotte Gum, and Mermaid.

Takara produced cards for a dice game similar to Strat-O-Matic, from 1978 to 1988. Another company, BBM, released its first set in 1991. BBM sets were the first to feature almost every player in Nippon Professional Baseball (NPB) team.

== Bibliography ==
- Gall, John (2006). Sayonara Home Run!. Chronicle Books, San Francisco, CA. – contains a wealth of photos of a wide variety of baseball menko
