= FUN! Online Games =

Video game magazine

- First Issue Cover
- Type: Bi-monthly magazine
- Owner: Beckett Media
- Founded: October 2009
- Headquarters: Dallas, Texas
- ISSN: 1941-3920
- Website: www.beckettfun.com

FUN! Online Games (abbreviated FOG) as it is more commonly known, is a magazine that is published by Beckett Media. The headquarters is in Dallas, Texas. This bi-monthly publication focuses on the online gaming world, with feature articles on games such as Webkinz World, Free Realms, Build-A-Bear Online, Neopets, Club Penguin, Toontown Online, Shining Stars, TY Beanie Babies, Pokémon, Wizard 101, Pixie Hollow, and more.

FUN! Online Games originally started out as Plushie Pals, a magazine for stuffed animal collectors. As more and more companies began attaching feature codes to their stuffed pets that could be used to activate online content, Plushie Pals started focusing more and more on online games. In October 2009, Beckett made the move to rename the magazine FUN! Online Games. The magazine still contains some plushie collector content, but its main focus is now the online content. FUN! Online Games is sold in Target, Wal-Mart, Barnes & Noble, Borders, Blockbuster, Toys 'R' Us, and many other specialty gaming and hobby stores.
