= Beckett Media =

American media company

Beckett Media, LLC
- Company type: Private
- Industry: Electronic publishing, publishing
- Genre: Automotive, collectibles, entertainment, sports, trading cards, video game
- Founded: Bowling Green, Ohio (1984)
- Founder: James Beckett
- Headquarters: Plano, Texas, U.S.
- Area served: U.S., Canada
- Products: Collector memorabilia, books, DVDs, magazines, novelties, pricing guides
- Services: Sports card and comic book grading
- Revenue: $42.2 million (2023)
- Number of employees: 550 (2023)
- Divisions: Beckett Grading Services, Comic Book Certification Service, Magazine publication
- Website: Beckett.com; Cbcscomics.com

Beckett Media, LLC is a firm dedicated to covering the sports card, comic book grading, collectibles, and sports memorabilia sectors. Established in 1984 by statistician Dr. James Beckett, it was originally known as Beckett Publications.

== History ==
James Beckett was a statistics professor before launching Beckett Media. In the 1970s, Beckett introduced some of the initial price guides for the baseball card industry, providing more detailed information on specific card prices compared to the newsletters that collectors were accustomed to. He founded Beckett Publications in 1984.

In January 2005, Beckett offloaded the company to Apprise Media, which aimed to broaden its portfolio in niche and enthusiast media. The company was renamed Beckett Media as part of the sale. On 26 January 2005, Apprise Media hired Peter A. Gudmundsson as the company CEO.

In May 2008, less than four years after being acquired by Apprise Media, there were rumors that Beckett Media was back on the market. Five undisclosed companies were reportedly contemplating buying the firm. In 2008, Beckett Media was acquired by Eli Global, a multinational company headquartered in Durham, North Carolina. Eli Global was established in 1991 by Greg Lindberg.

In 2010, Beckett Media embarked on a major revamp of its digital presence. On March 8, 2010, they revealed a collaboration with SeatGeek to enhance their website's functionality. As a result of this partnership, links to the sports ticket search engine SeatGeek were incorporated on the primary sports teams and leagues pages on Beckett's site. This integration allowed users to seamlessly navigate to SeatGeek's ticket search system for specific teams.

Beckett Media is not Better Business Bureau (BBB) accredited and had an F rating, on an A+ through F letter-grade scale, BBB having "identified a pattern in consumer complaints" and noting "This Inquiry was closed on February, 14, 2025, as Failure to Address or Eliminate the Pattern of Complaints".

== Products ==
=== Beckett sports card grading ===
Beckett Media's publications pioneered an early card grading system, offering a method to assess their quality. This system defined six distinct levels, ranging from mint to poor condition. Beckett Media operates a sports card grading service named Beckett Grading Services. This service holds the exclusive rights to grade and authenticate trading cards from the Topps Vault. In 2016, Beckett Media inaugurated an autograph verification enterprise called Beckett Authentication Services.

=== Comic book grading ===
Comic Book Certification Service (CBCS), founded by Dr. Michael Bornstein, his son Alec, and Steve Borock, serves as a specialized, independent, and neutral third-party grading entity for comic books. They offer a platform, either through their website or via authorized dealers, where owners can submit their comic books for grading and secure encapsulation. Additionally, during comic book conventions, CBCS representatives are present to directly accept submissions.

Upon receipt, the comics first undergo a thorough inspection to identify any noticeable defects, like missing staples. They are subsequently evaluated by an expert appraiser in a climate-controlled setting. This examination also encompasses verification for possible refurbishments or forgery. Upon review, comics are scored on a scale from 0.5 to 10, with ascending values signifying better quality. CBCS provides either a witness signature verification service or leverages the technology from Beckett Authentication Services for signature authentication. After this process, every comic is securely encapsulated in a tamper-proof slab.

=== Fanspot.com ===
In November 2005, Beckett Media embarked on a journey to develop a social networking platform tailored for casual sports enthusiasts. By April 2006, their efforts culminated in the unveiling of FanSpot.com during the 2006 National Sports Collectors Convention. By the end of the month, the site had 1800 registered users. By the close of 2008, user engagement on FanSpot.com had dwindled to a halt, even though many sections of the site remained operational. However, by 2013, FanSpot had completely ceased operations.

=== Internet sales ===
From 1995, Beckett Media utilized the internet to facilitate the trade of collectibles and sports cards. Aligning with a range of collectible dealers, they provided an extensive online catalog of products. Through Beckett's website, consumers had the convenience of directly buying items from these dealers. By 2005, the platform had seen sales amounting to $13 million, and the count of associated dealers had risen to 165 by the next year.

=== Magazines ===
Beckett Media produces price guides and books pertaining to collectibles and also deals in the distribution of sports memorabilia. An early publication from the company was "Beckett Baseball Card Monthly," which at its zenith garnered a readership of approximately one million. In 2008, Beckett transitioned its monthly price guides for football, baseball, hockey, and basketball cards into seasonal editions. Starting from April 2008, "Beckett Sports Card Monthly" emerged as its sole monthly sports-centric magazine.

Beckett Media also releases four magazines that delve into non-sports collectible card games, like "Magic: The Gathering", as well as hobby and entertainment subjects, including anime and manga. In 2005, the collective circulation of the titles stood at 800,000 copies. By 2008, this number fluctuated between 500,000 and 700,000. To decrease overheads, the company started reducing its monthly publications. Although this strategy worked in trimming costs, it sparked concerns among consumers and led to a drop in sales. In 2003, virtual pets site Neopets selected Beckett Media as the publisher of its new monthly Neopets: The Official Magazine. The bi-monthly magazine premiered in September 2003, and was canceled in January 2008 after 26 issues. Beckett replaced the issues remaining in pre-paid subscriptions with their new bi-monthly magazine, Plushie Pals. Aimed at plushie collectors, Plushie Pals includes pricing guides for a range of plushie lines, including Neopets, Webkinz, Shining Stars, TY Beanie Babies, and Pokémon. In October 2009, Beckett replaced Plushie Pals with a new magazine, FUN! Online Games, which focuses on various kid and family oriented online game sites, including Webkinz, Club Penguin, Neopets, Disney Online and Wizard 101. According to the company, in its first month it had 100,000 readers.

In 2006, Beckett Media ventured into the video game domain by introducing "Beckett Massive Online Gamer." Launched in May 2006, this magazine catered to enthusiasts of various massively multiplayer online games (MMORPGs). It not only provided game-related information but also showcased related products and featured articles on lifestyle and entertainment themes.
