= Omocha-e =

Japanese art genre

Omocha-e (Japanese: 玩具絵, "toy prints") is a genre of Japanese woodblock prints ukiyo-e created as picture books and toys for children. The genre was considered inferior to prints of kabuki actors (yakusha-e) or prints with beautiful women (bijin-ga).

There were many types of Omocha-e, including paper dolls to be dressed (kisekae-e), matching-picture games (e-awase), board games (such as sugoroku), dioramas to be cut out and assembled (tatebanko or kumitate-e), and encyclopedic compilations (monozukushi).

== History ==
Woodblock printing became widespread during the Edo Period. Print shops housed the equivalent of tabloids (ukiyo-e), landscape prints that featured tourist sites, and omocha-e. Such prints often functioned as easily transportable gifts that relayed the latest trends. Moreover, much like Western toys, omocha-e was heavily impacted by trends, resulting in several containing the phrase shipan, "latest edition", at the top of each print. The popularity of such toys found a resurgence during Japan's industrialization and subsequent international conflicts during the early 20th century with adults rather than children. This new audience was arguably an extension of Japan's efforts to create a sense of nationalism within its people by utilizing nostalgia. However, the modern and more vernacular omocha (Japan's equivalent of "toy") inspired by the new industrial Japan quickly took its place. Omocha, though similar to omocha-e, represents an umbrella term for toys ranging from children's playthings to religious votives and is not limited to woodblock prints.

Omocha-e by Utagawa Yoshifuji

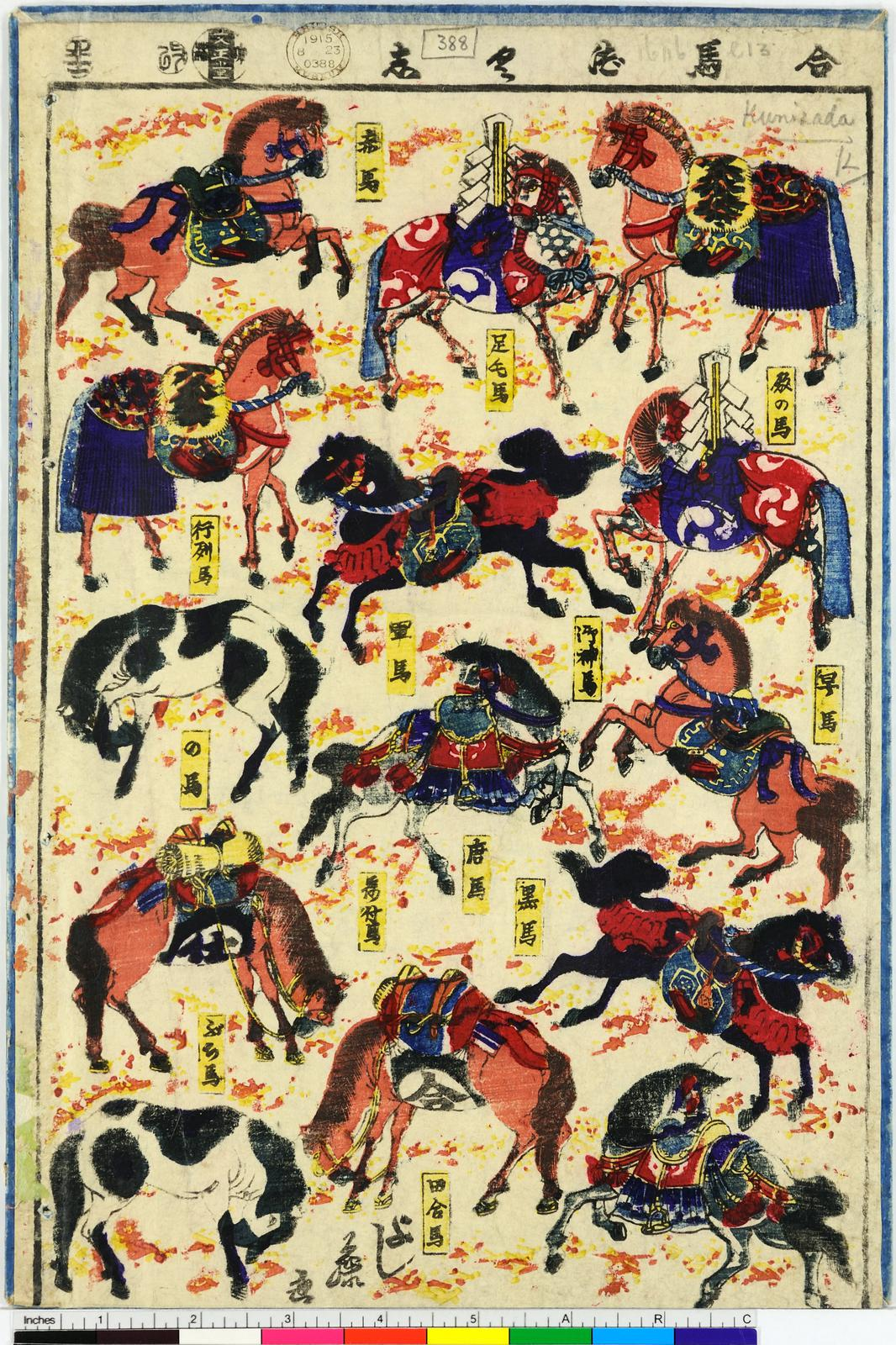
Omocha-e with horses

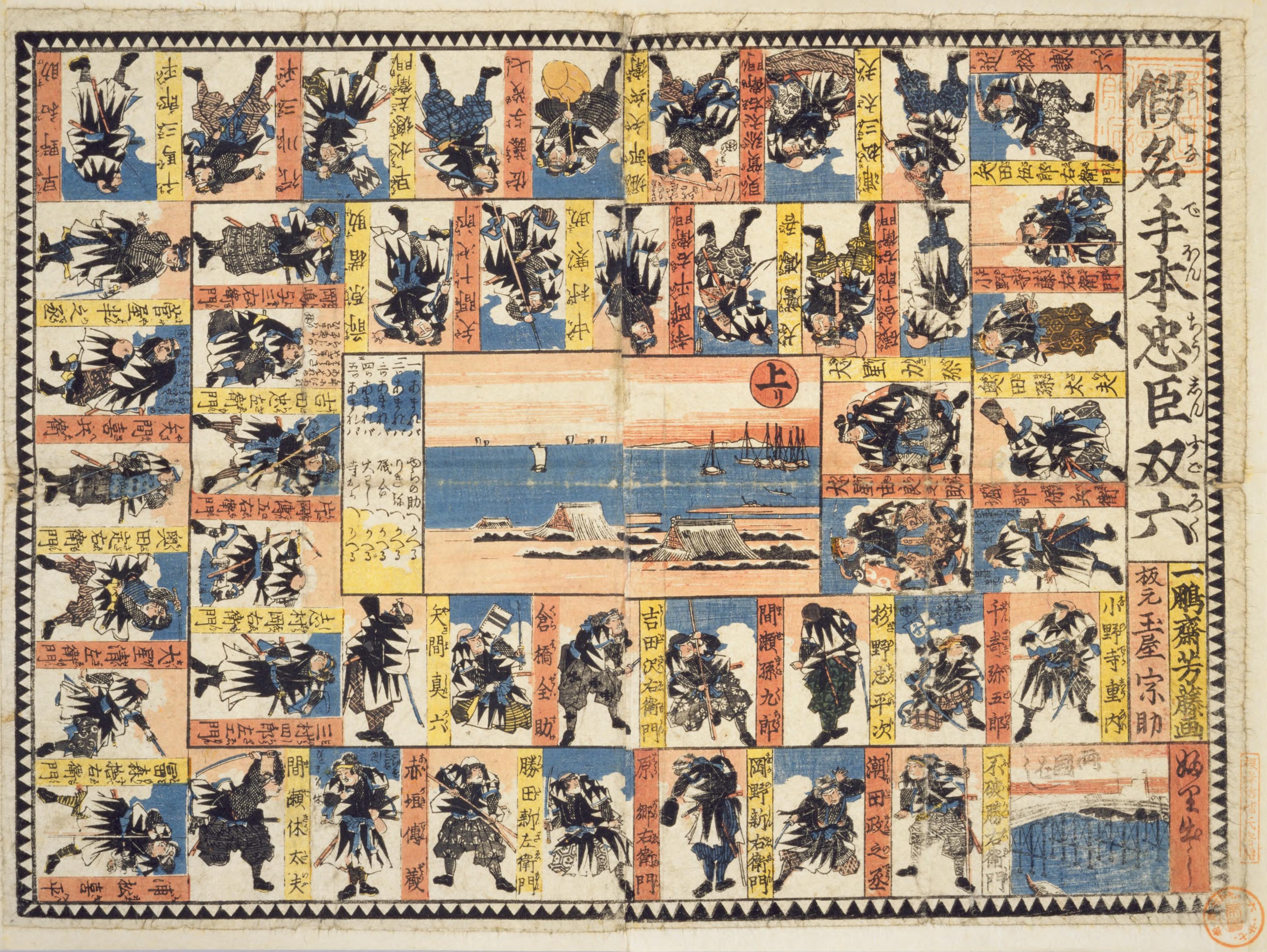
Omocha-e from the picture album "Sugoroku"

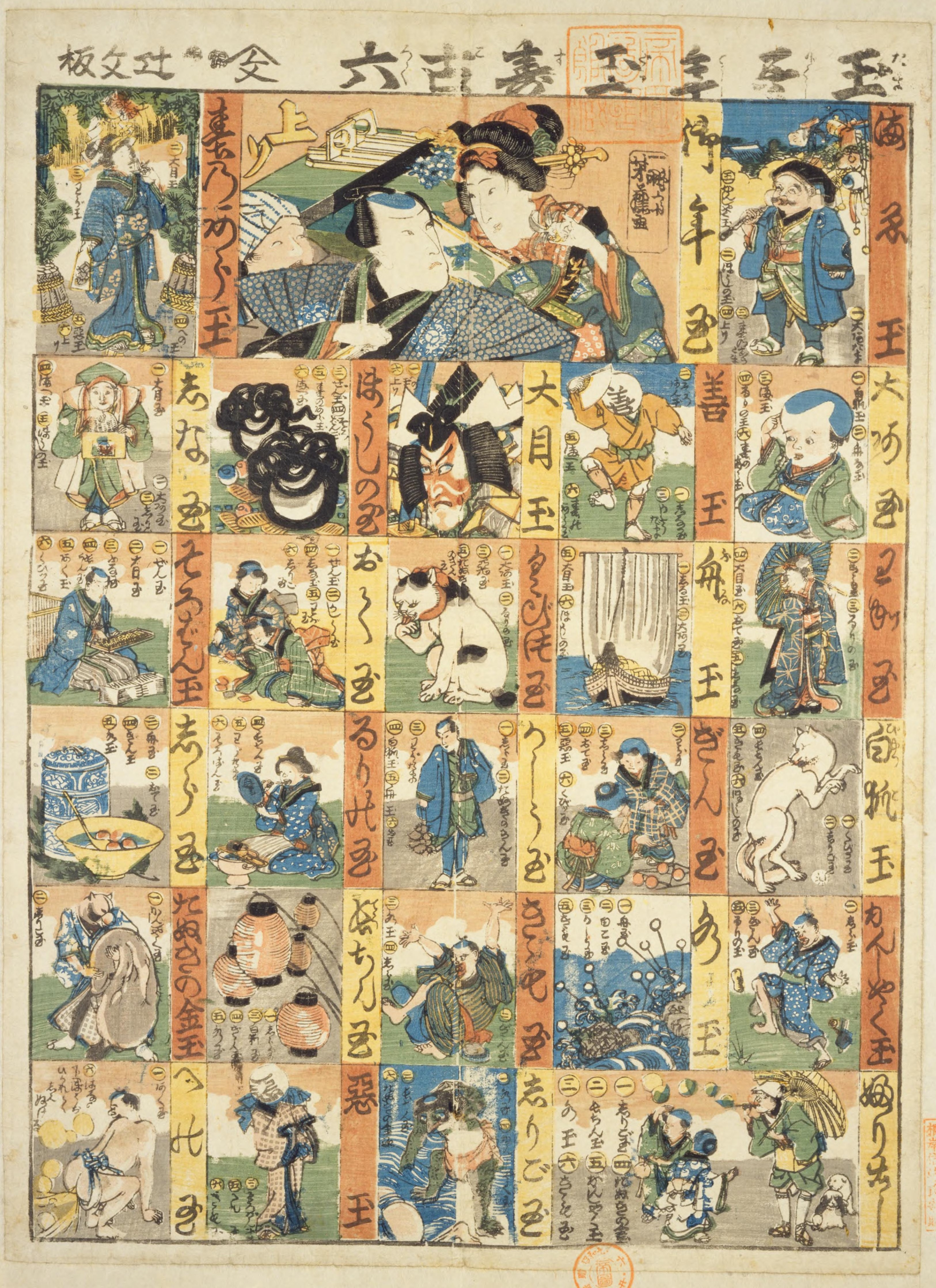
Omocha-e with cats and women from the picture album "Sugoroku"

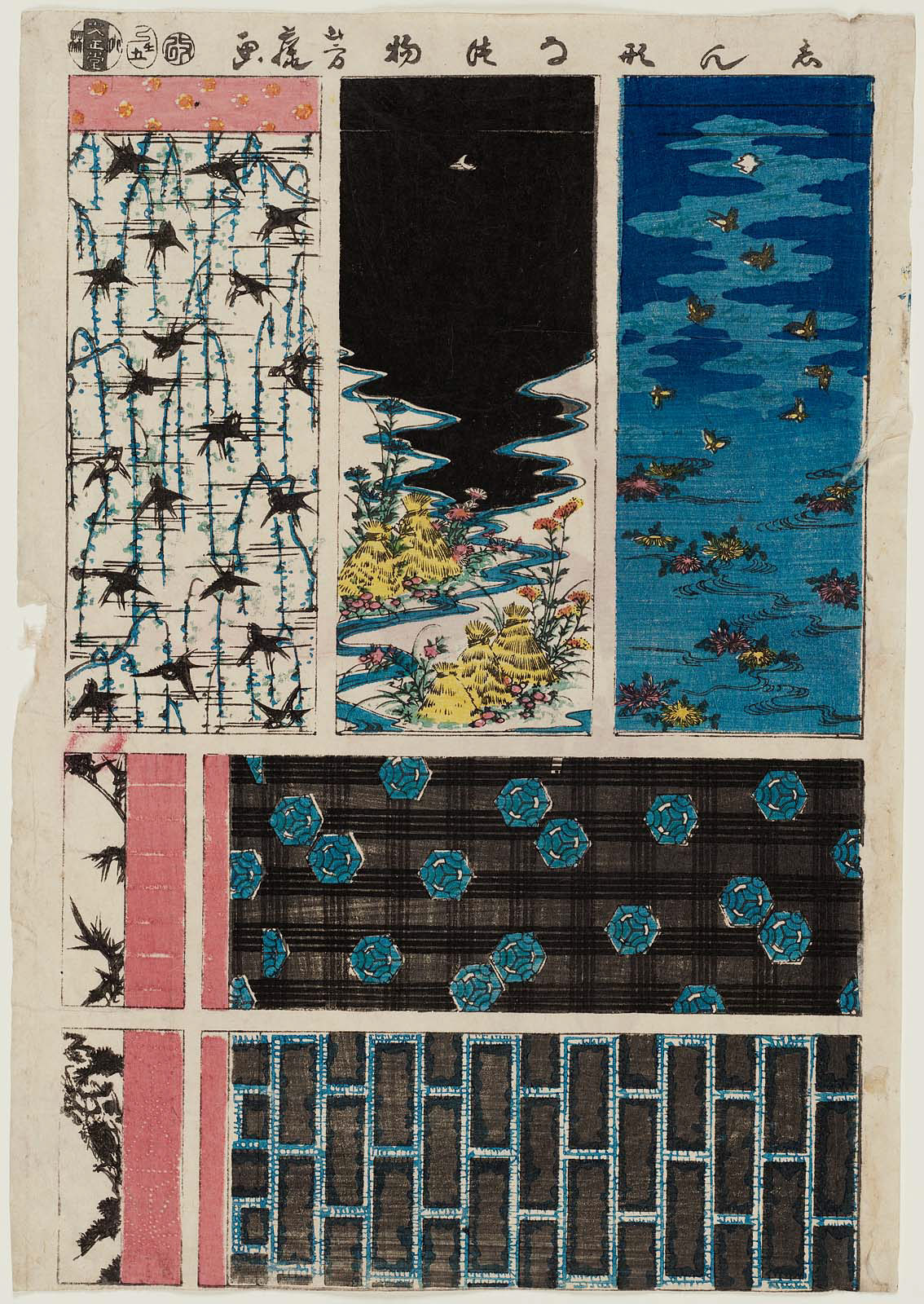
New Patterns for Summer Costumes

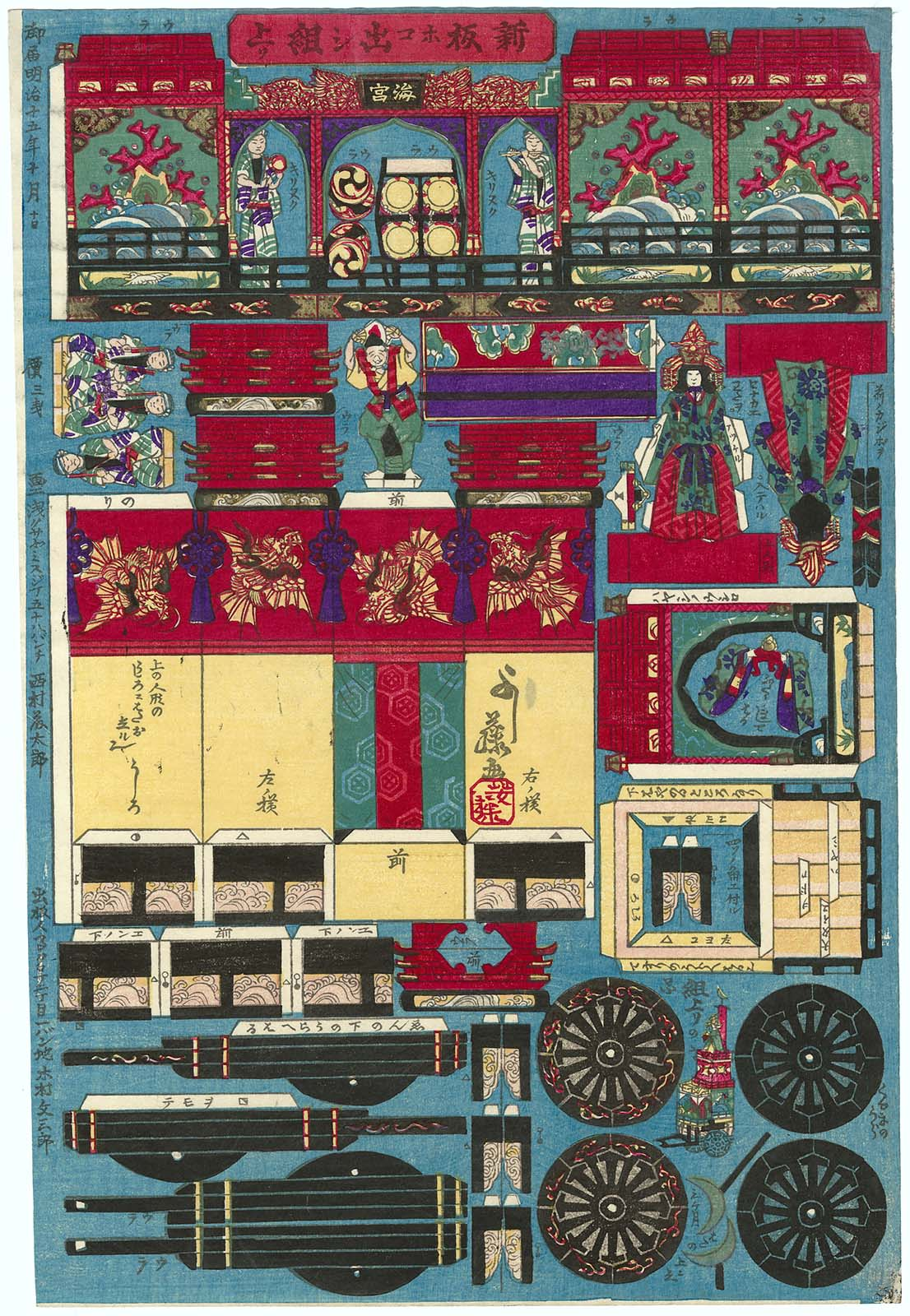
New Print of Hoko Float to Assemble

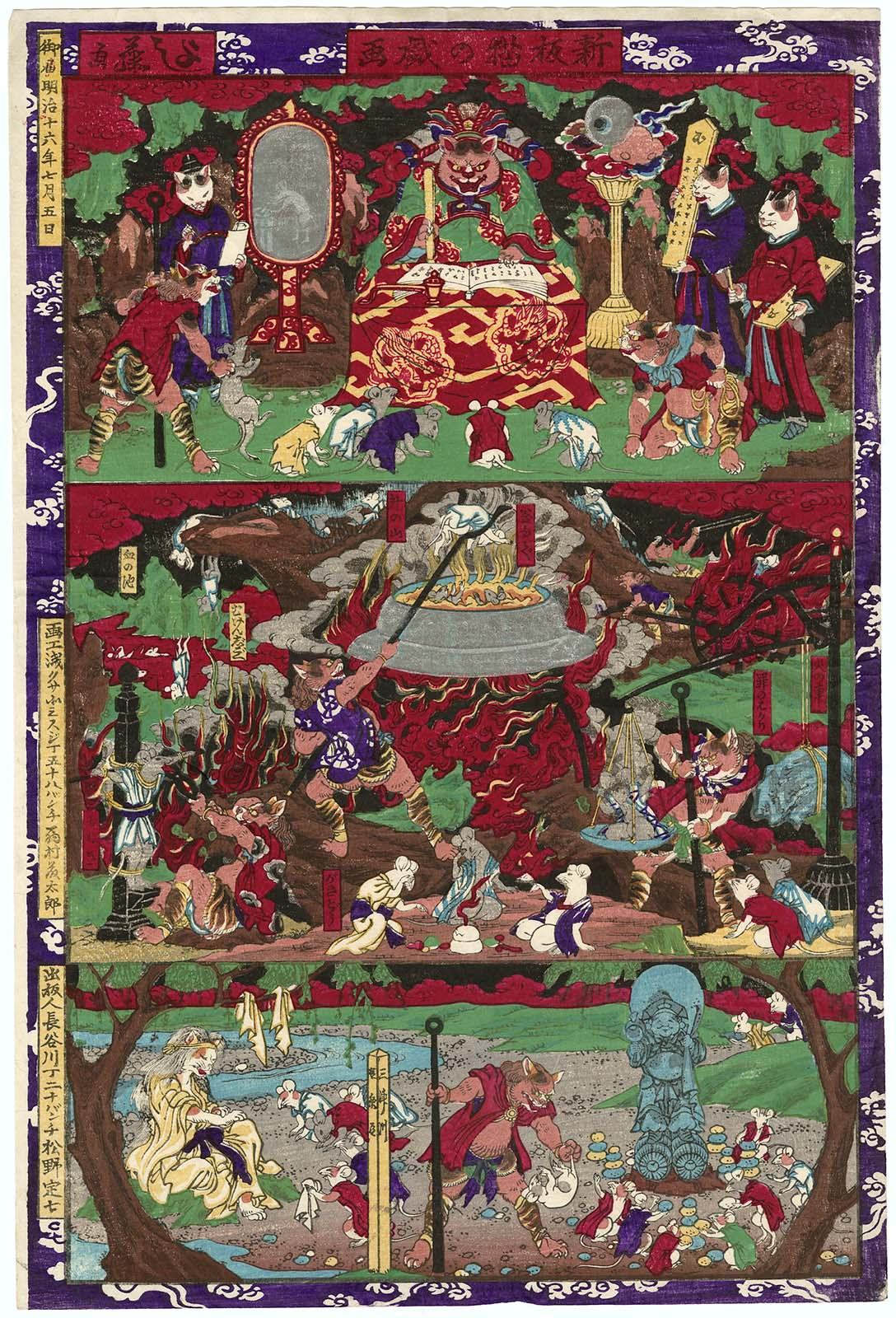
Newly Published Comic Picture of Cats

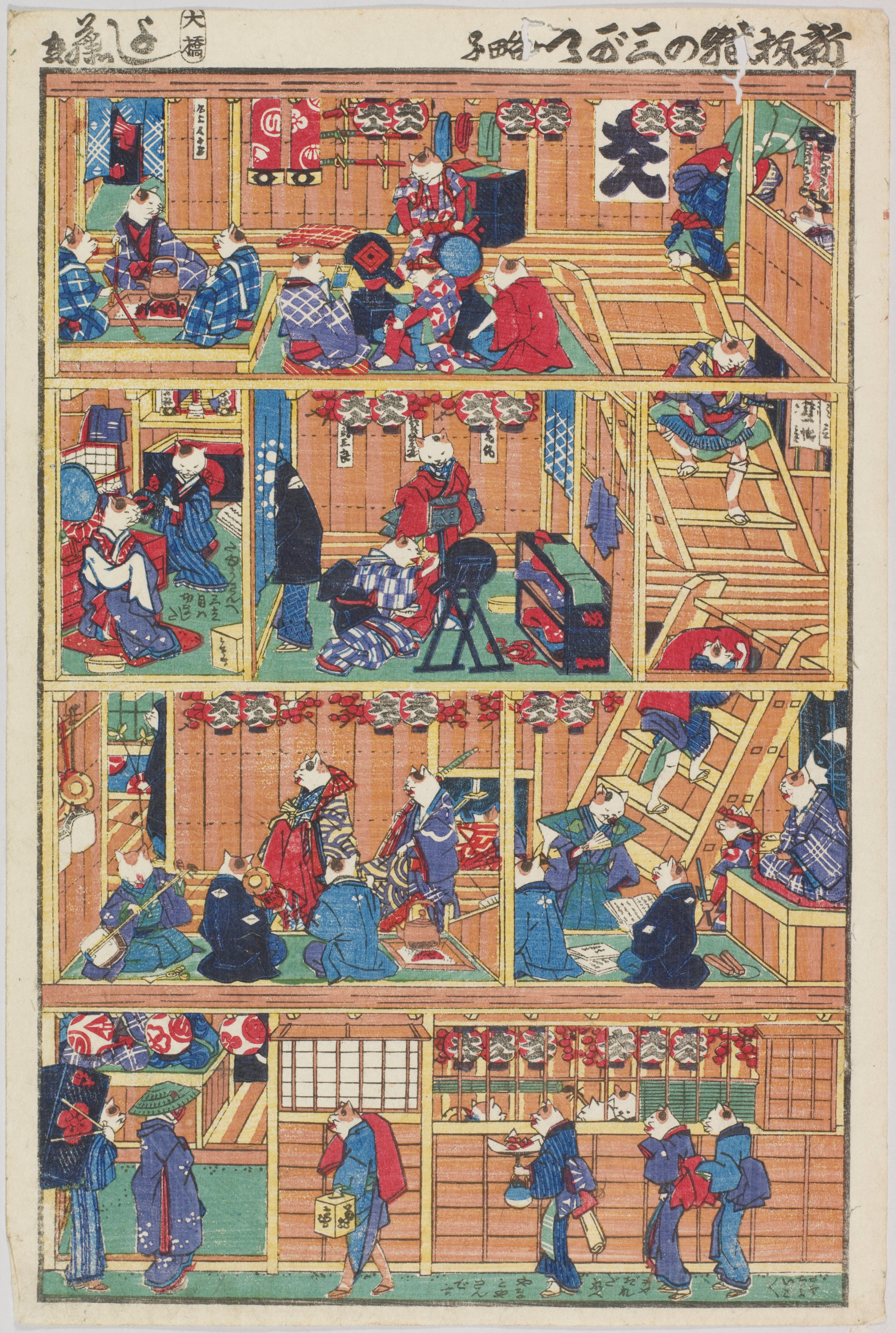
Cats in backstage at Kabuki theater
