= Tuff Stuff =

Online magazine for sports collectibles

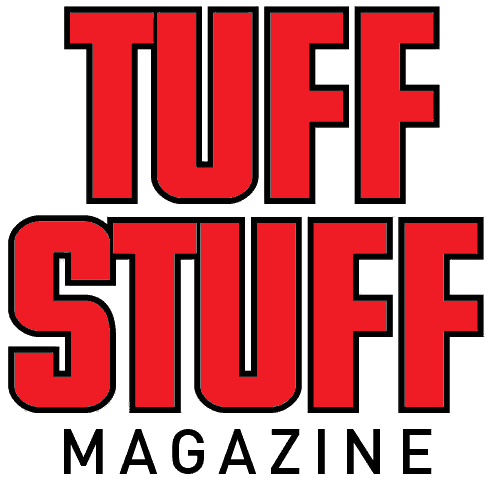
- Editor: Scott Fragale
- Categories: Collectible
- Frequency: Monthly
- Format: Print (1984–2011); Online (2011–present)
- Publisher: F+W (2011)
- Founder: Ernie White
- First issue: April 1984; 40 years ago
- Country: United States
- Website: tuffstuff.com

Tuff Stuff is an online magazine that publishes prices for trading cards and other collectibles from a variety of sports, including baseball, basketball, American football, ice hockey, golf, auto racing and mixed martial arts. The print edition of the magazine was published from 1984 to 2011, when it ceased publication, As a result, Tuff Stuff has remained as an online publication to date.

== History and profile ==
The magazine was launched in April 1984 by a store owner, Ernie White, who named the magazine for his ability to offer the "tough stuff" to find in his store and to write about in the magazine. The magazine was originally an 11¼ by 15½-inch newsprint publication. It grew to a tabloid-sized, glossy-covered magazine in the late 1980s before shrinking back to standard magazine size (8 by 10 7/8) with a glossy cover in 1990.

The Richmond, Virginia-based magazine was sold to Landmark Communications, which sold it to Krause Publications in 1999, publisher of the competing Sports Cards Magazine. The two magazines' content merged in 2000, taking the 'Tuff Stuff' name. The magazine took on the F+W Publications Inc. label after that company obtained Krause in 2002.

In addition to columns and feature stories, the magazine included yearly pricing for cards in six sports — baseball, basketball, American football, ice hockey, golf and auto racing — with roughly 100 pages of card pricing in each issue. This approach differs from its major competitor, Beckett, which published magazines devoted specifically to each sport. Issues of the magazine also included values and checklists for sports autographs, figures, and other sports collectibles.

In January 2011, F+W announced that Tuff Stuff ceased publication, due to declining advertising revenue, according to magazine staffers. Readers switching from print to electronic devices accelerated the demise of the magazine. In addition to the closure, Sports Collectors Digest, returned to a bi-monthly publication schedule.

In January 2018, with the CEO and two other top executives leaving the company, F+W slashed its workforce by 40%.

F+W filed for Chapter 11 bankruptcy protection on March 10, 2019. The book publishing assets of the company were won by Penguin Random House at a bankruptcy auction in June 2019. The grouping of the assets drew criticism. Several properties including Sky & Telescope were sold individually.
