= Menko =

Japanese card game

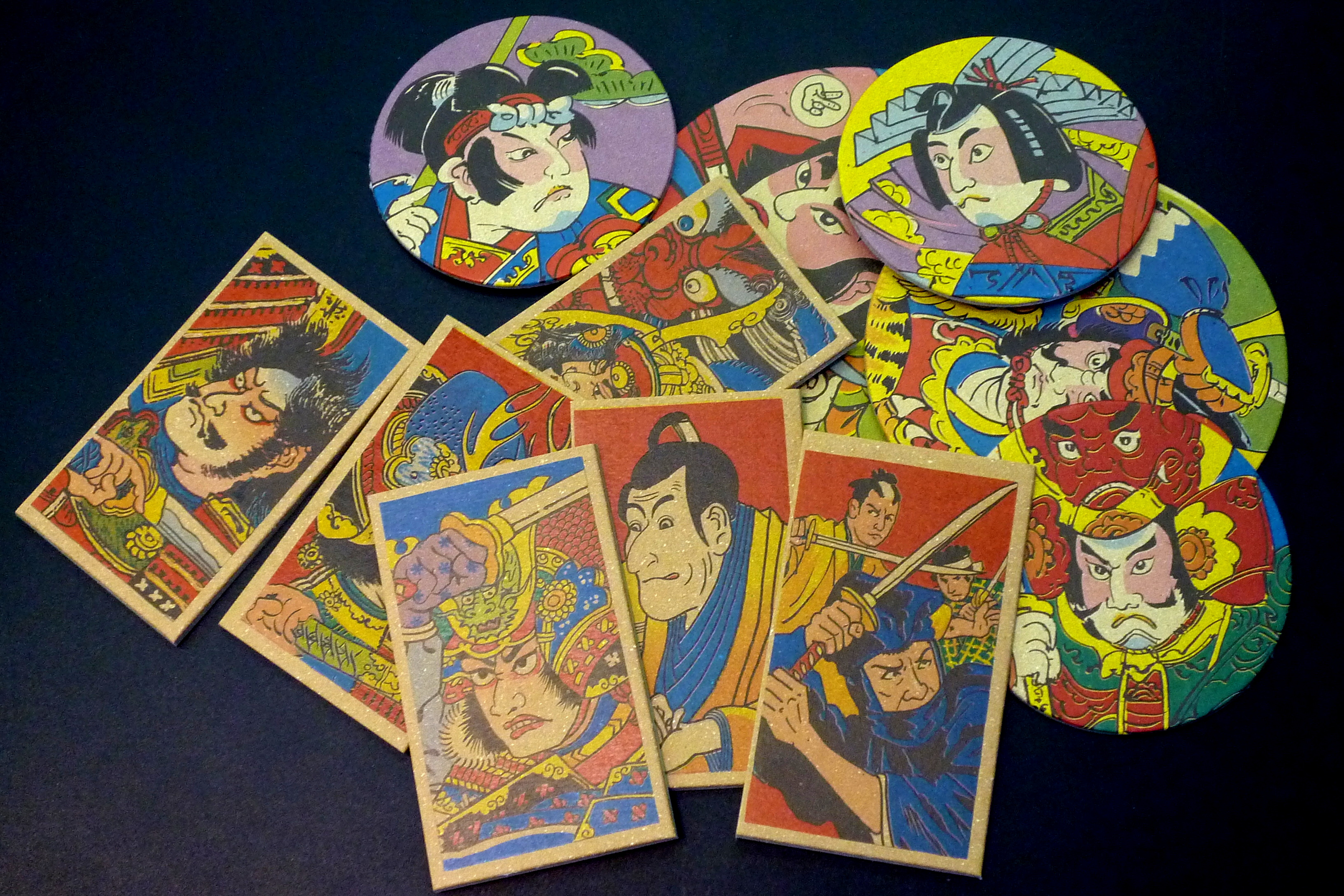
Rectangular and various size round menko cards.

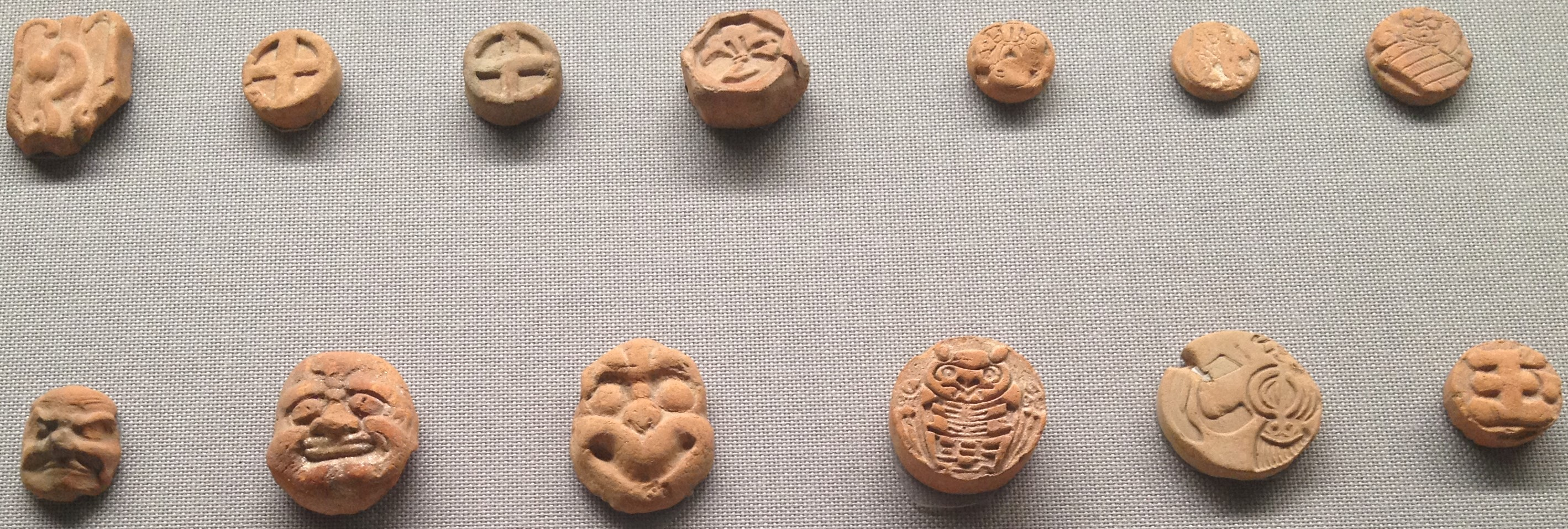
Men'uchi from the Edo period.

Menko (めんこ, 面子), also known as menchi, pansu or patchin (めんち、ぱんす、ぱっちん), is a Japanese card game played by two or more players. It is also the name of the type of cards used to play this game. Each player uses Menko cards made from thick paper or cardboard, printed on one or both sides with images from anime, manga, and other works. A player's card is placed on the hardwood or concrete floor and the other player throws down his or her card, trying to flip the other player's card with a gust of wind or by striking his or her card against the other card. If they succeed, they take both cards. The player who takes all the cards, or the one with the most cards at the game's end, wins the game.

Menko has been popular since the Edo period. They were originally known as men'uchi (面打) and were made by putting clay in molds which were then baked. Its quick and simple rules have made it popular among children of all age groups. Because technique is just as important as power in this game, smaller children can compete fairly with older players.

The pictures on these cards reflect the popular culture of their time, and Menko cards from the past reflect important information about their era. In the Edo and early Meiji period, images like ninja and samurai were popular. Before World War II, the most popular images were of the military, like fighter planes and battleships. After the war, characters from anime and manga were popular, as well as baseball players. Collectors of Japanese baseball cards collect baseball menko. In the late 1980s to early 1990s, Menko cards were decorated with holographs and sparkles.

== See also ==
- Ddakji – similar Korean game
- Milk caps – similar Western game
- Omocha-e
