= Football card =

Football card may refer to trading cards related with diverse forms of team sport football, such as:

- American football card
- Association football card
- Australian rules football card

Not to be confused with:

- Red and yellow cards, part of the Association football rules
