= 9 by 5 Impression Exhibition =

Art exhibition in Melbourne, Australia

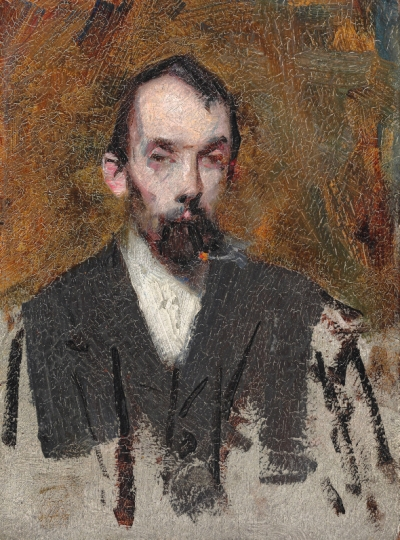
Portrait by Arthur Streeton of Louis Abrahams smoking a cigar. Abrahams, a tobacconist, supplied the artists with wooden cigar-box lids for painting impressions. Many of the lids measured 9 by 5 inches, hence the name of the exhibition.

The 9 by 5 Impression Exhibition was an art exhibition held in Melbourne, Victoria, Australia. It opened on 17 August 1889 at Buxton's Rooms on Swanston Street and featured 183 "impressions", the majority of which were painted by Charles Conder, Tom Roberts and Arthur Streeton, three leading members of the Heidelberg School art movement, also known as Australian impressionism. Two other members, Frederick McCubbin and Charles Douglas Richardson, made smaller contributions.

The exhibition's name references the dimensions of most of the paintings (9 x 5 inches), which were painted en plein air on cigar box lids supplied by Louis Abrahams, a patron of the Heidelberg School and owner of the Melbourne cigar business Sniders & Abrahams. In staging the exhibition, the artists sought to introduce the Melbourne public to impressionist painting, and in doing so established themselves as the vanguard of Australian art. The works, together with the artists' overall arrangement of the exhibition space, reflected several concurrent styles and movements, including Japonisme, aestheticism and symbolism, with James McNeill Whistler being a particularly strong influence.

The majority of the 9 by 5s were painted over the autumn and winter of 1889, which comes through in the tones and weather effects of many of the landscapes. The rural suburb of Heidelberg, where Streeton had established an artists' camp the previous year, is featured in many of the works. Melbourne's urban life and culture are also depicted, with landmarks such as Princess Theatre, the Old Treasury and the Burke and Wills statue making appearances, as well as the city's trams and games of Australian rules football.

The exhibition created much lively commentary at the time and is now seen as a "celebrated event in Australian art history". 9 by 5s continue to appear on the market; in 2019, Roberts' She-Oak and Sunlight sold at Sotheby's for A$770,000, and was acquired by the National Gallery of Victoria. In 2012, to mark the 123rd anniversary of the exhibition, arts benefactor Max Carter donated four 9 by 5s (valued at over A$3,000,000) to the Art Gallery of South Australia, the largest group of 9 by 5s ever given to an Australian public institution.

== Gallery of 9 by 5s ==
=== Charles Conder ===
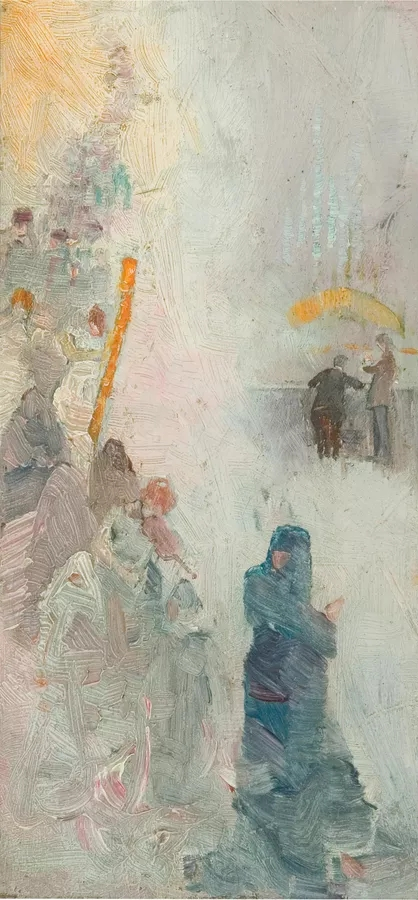
A Dream of Handel's Largo, 1889, Art Gallery of South Australia

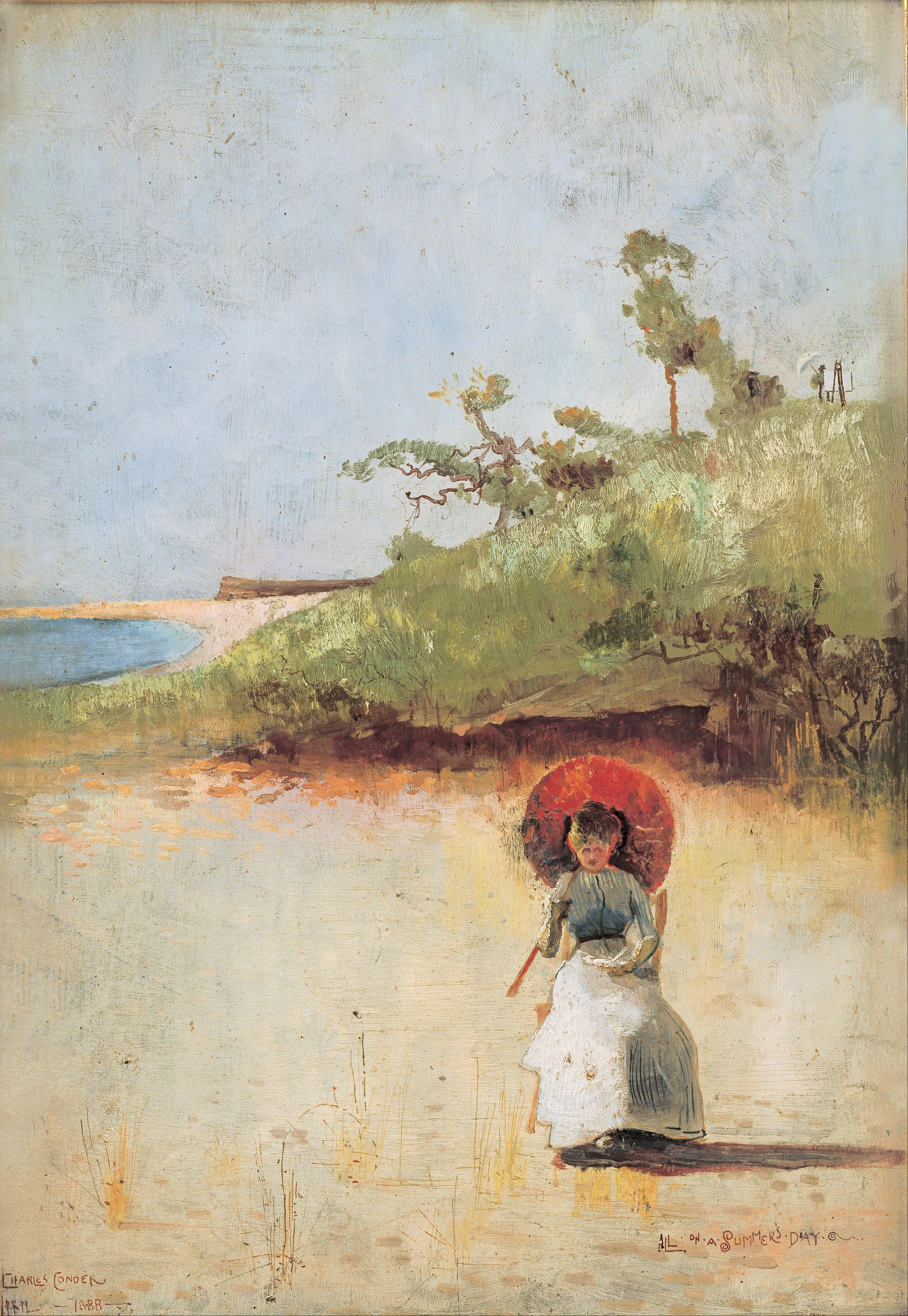
All on a summer's day, 1888, National Gallery of Australia

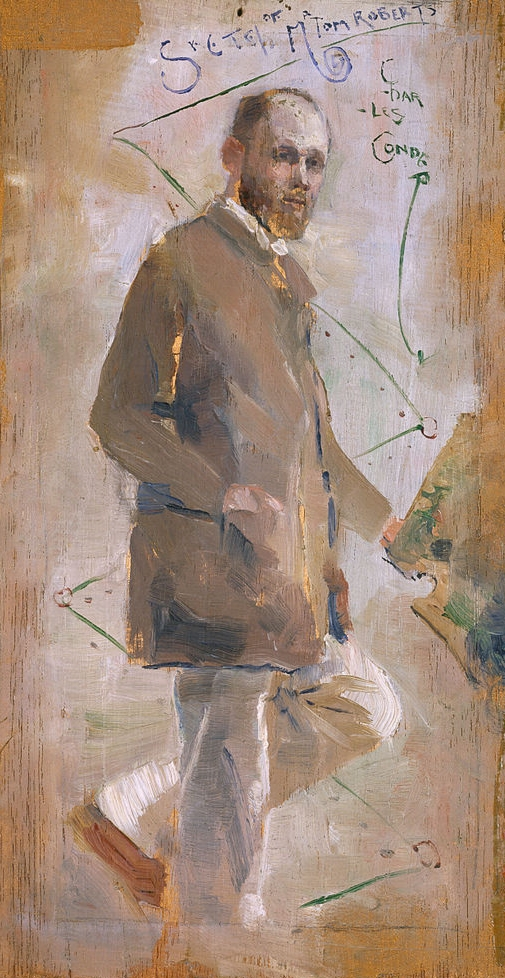
An Impressionist (Tom Roberts), 1889, Art Gallery of New South Wales

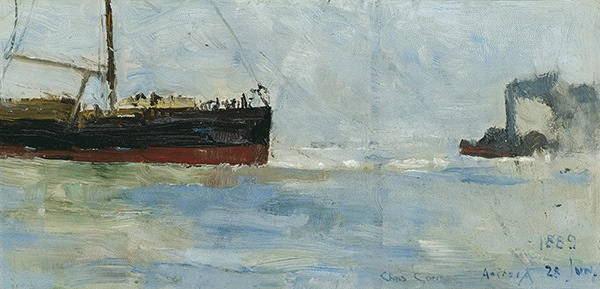
Arcadia, 1889, private collection

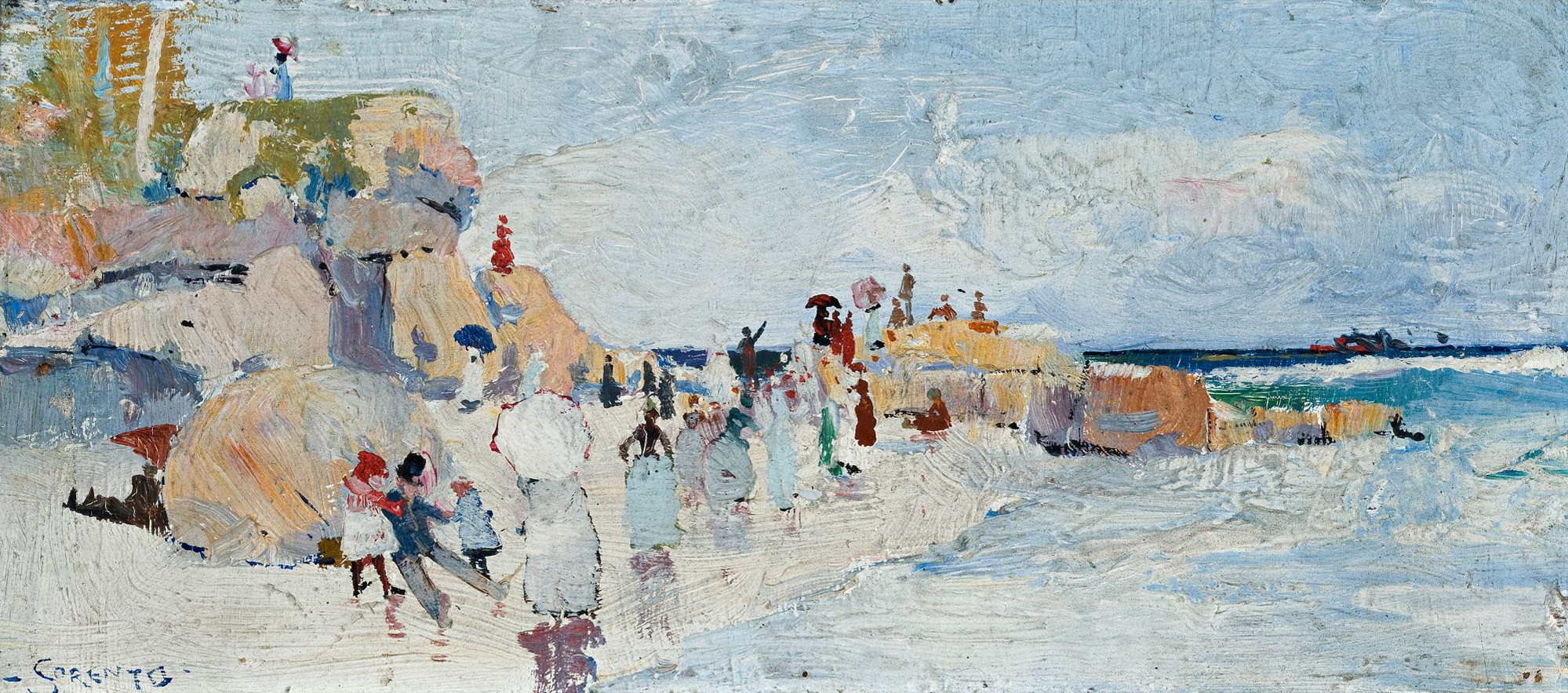
Centennial Choir at Sorrento, 1889, private collection

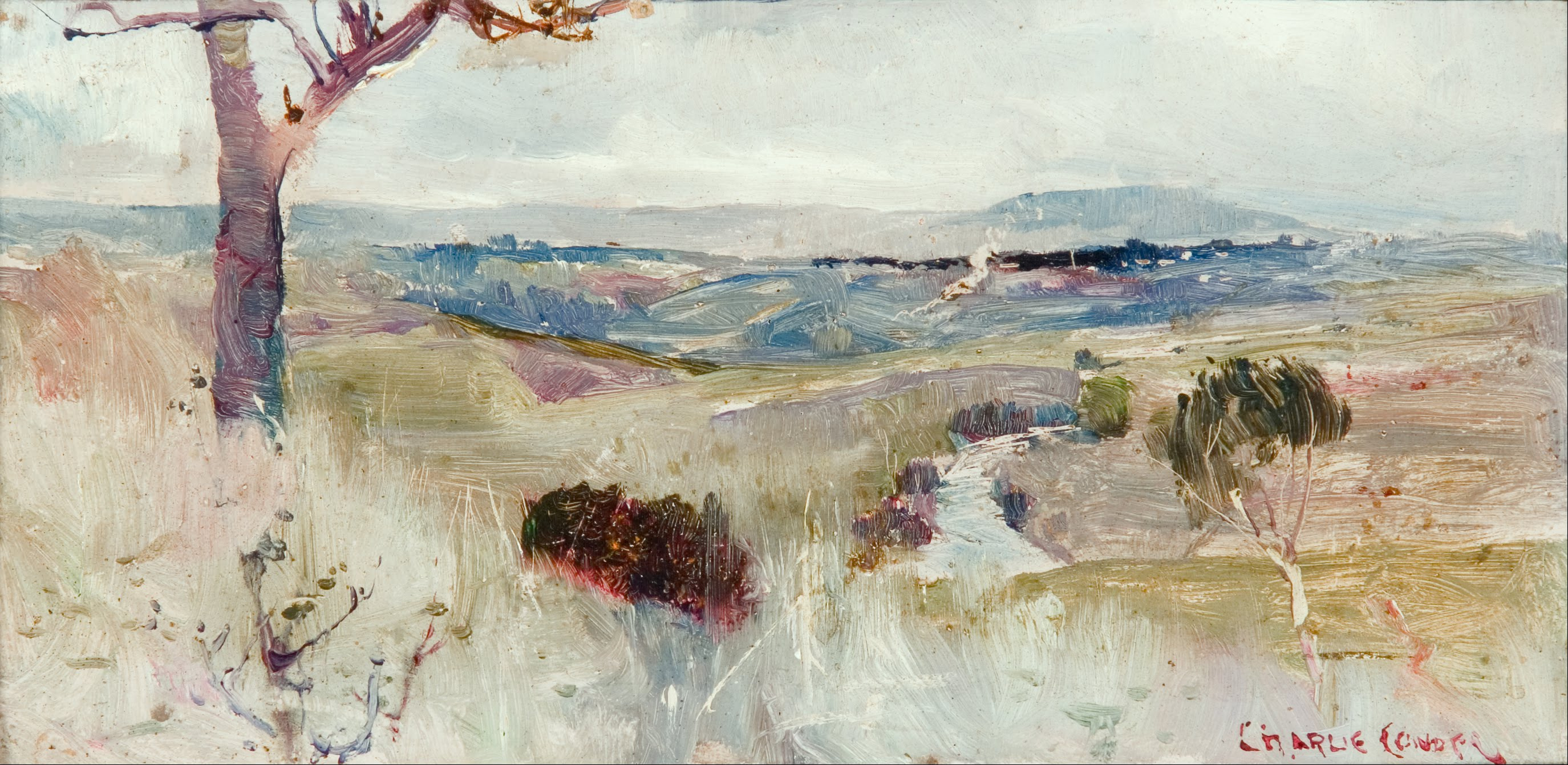
Dandenongs from Heidelberg, 1889, Art Gallery of South Australia

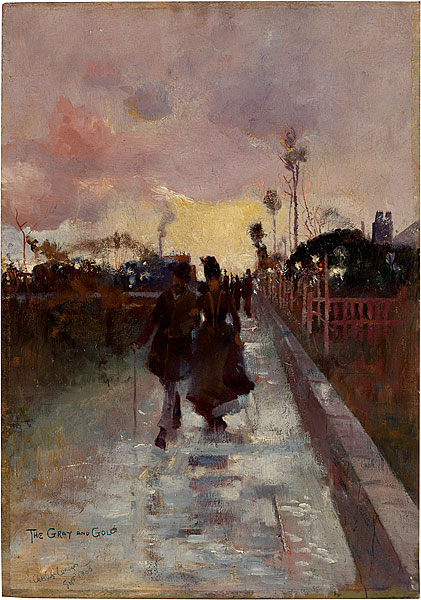
Going Home, 1889, National Gallery of Australia

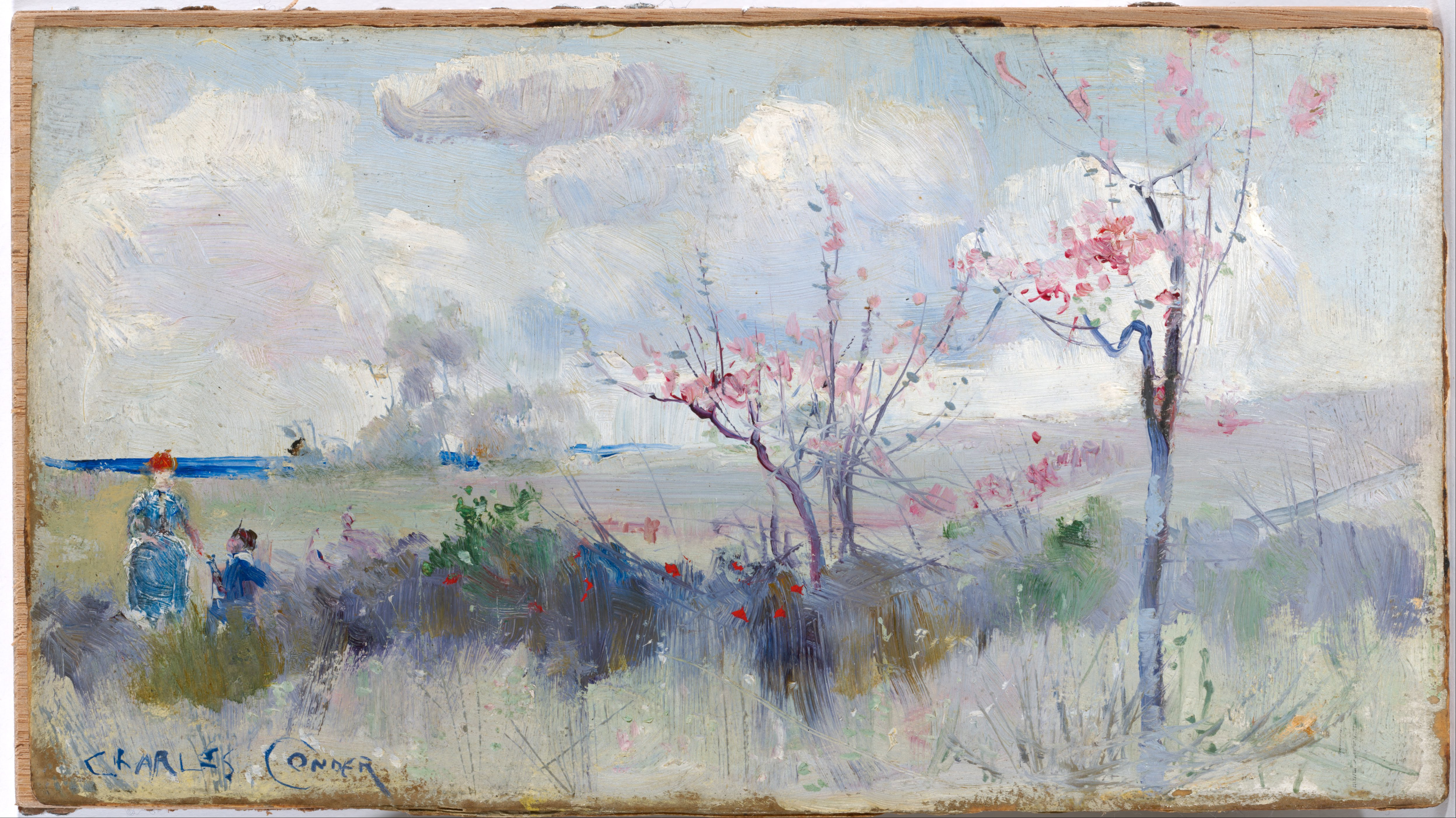
Herrick's Blossoms, 1888, National Gallery of Australia

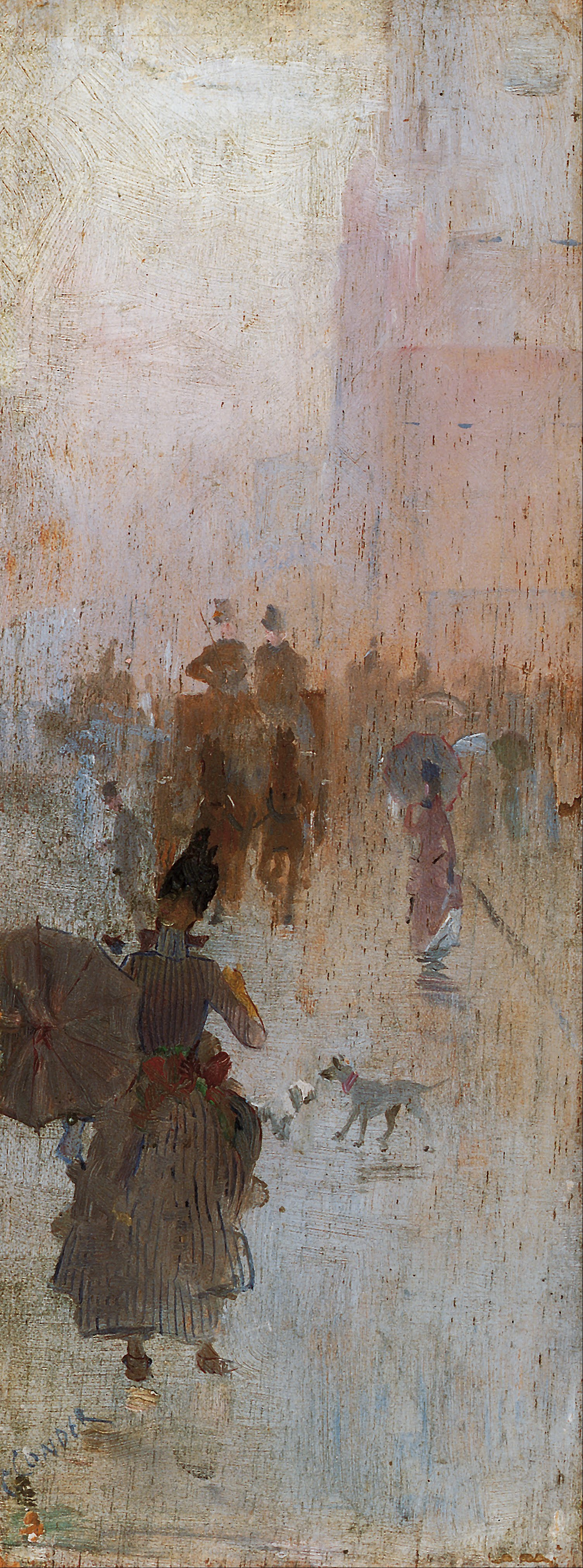
How We Lost Poor Flossie, 1889, Art Gallery of South Australia

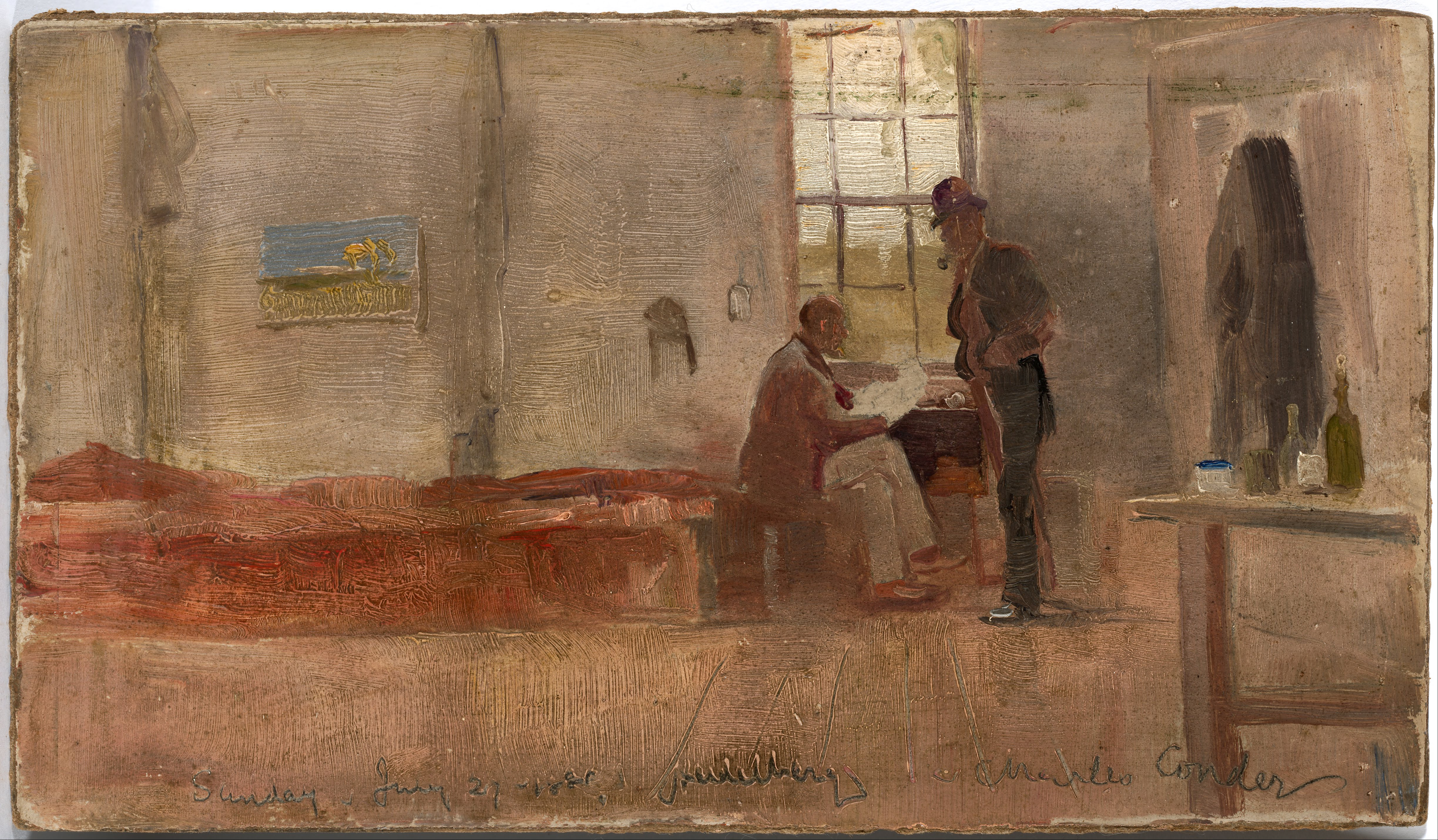
Impressionists' camp, 1889, National Gallery of Australia

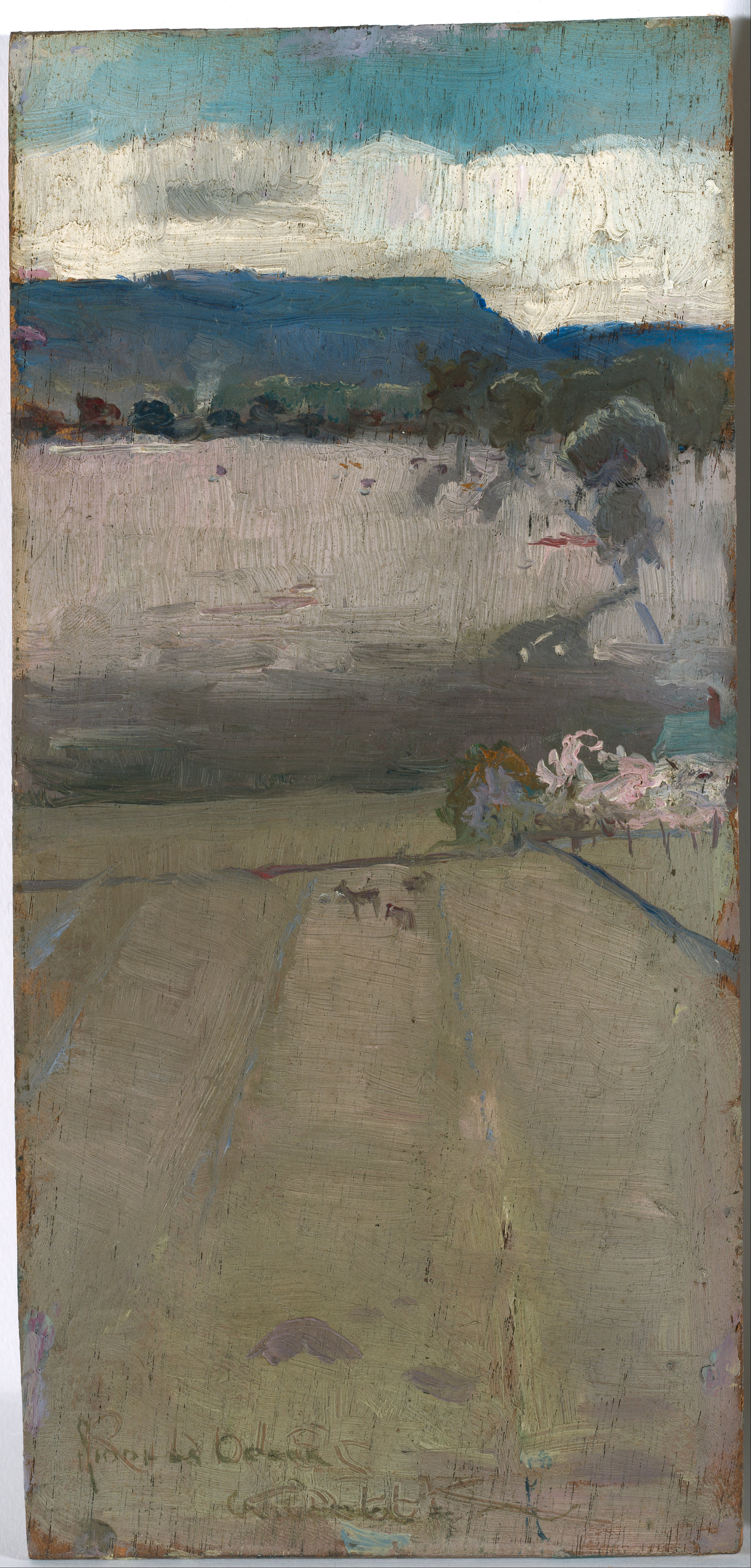
Riddell's Creek, 1889, National Gallery of Australia

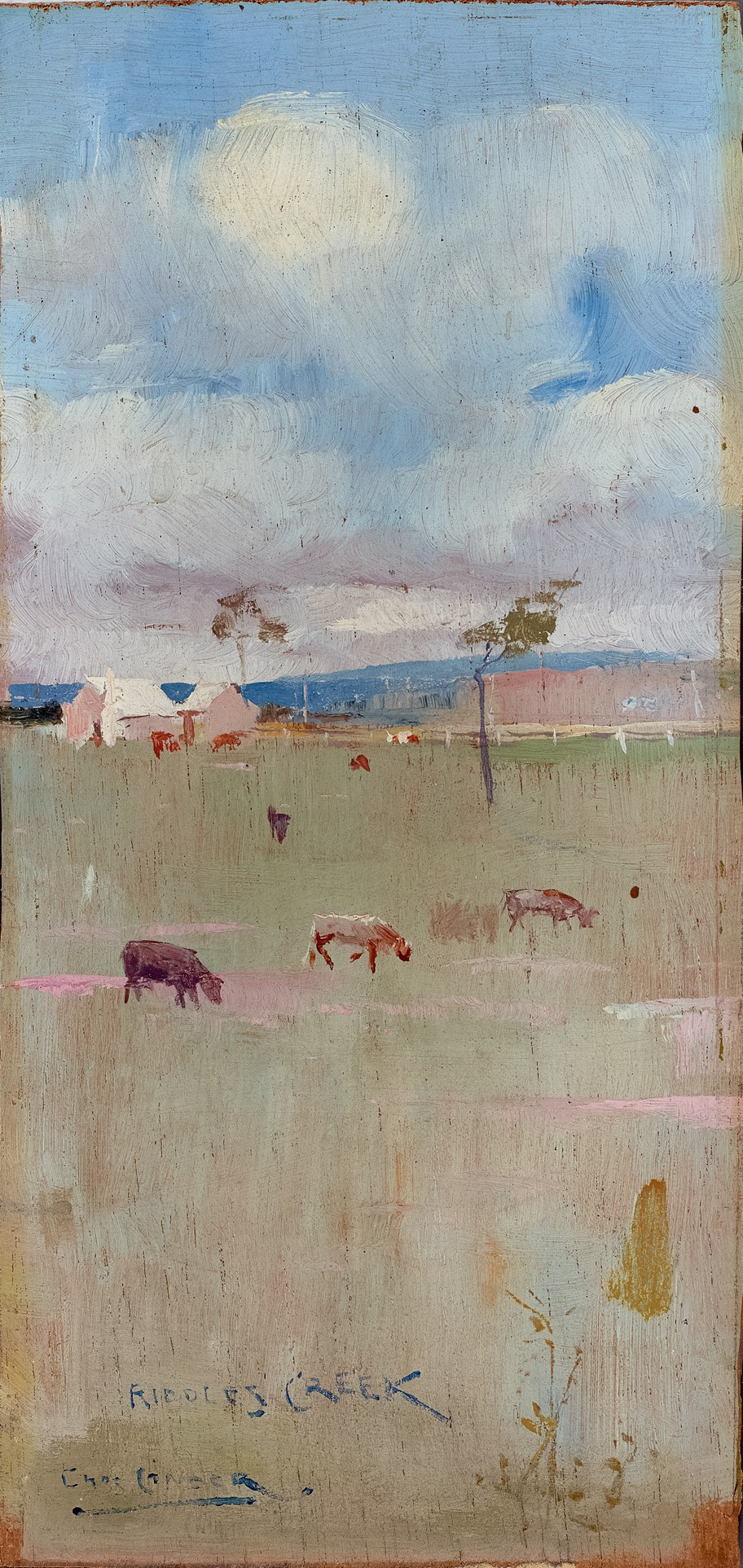
The Three Cows, 1889, private collection

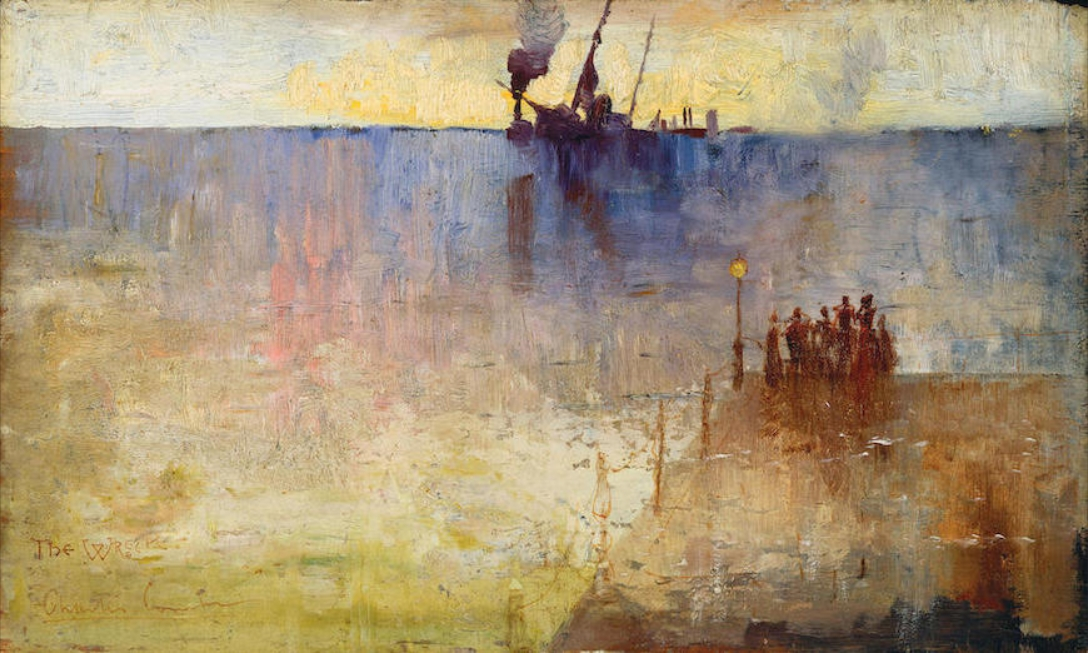
The Wreck, 1889, private collection

=== Tom Roberts ===
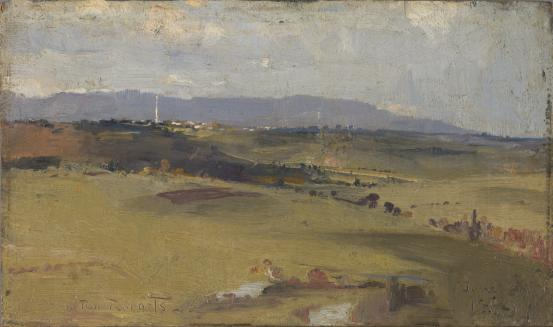
Across the Dandenongs, 1889, National Gallery of Victoria

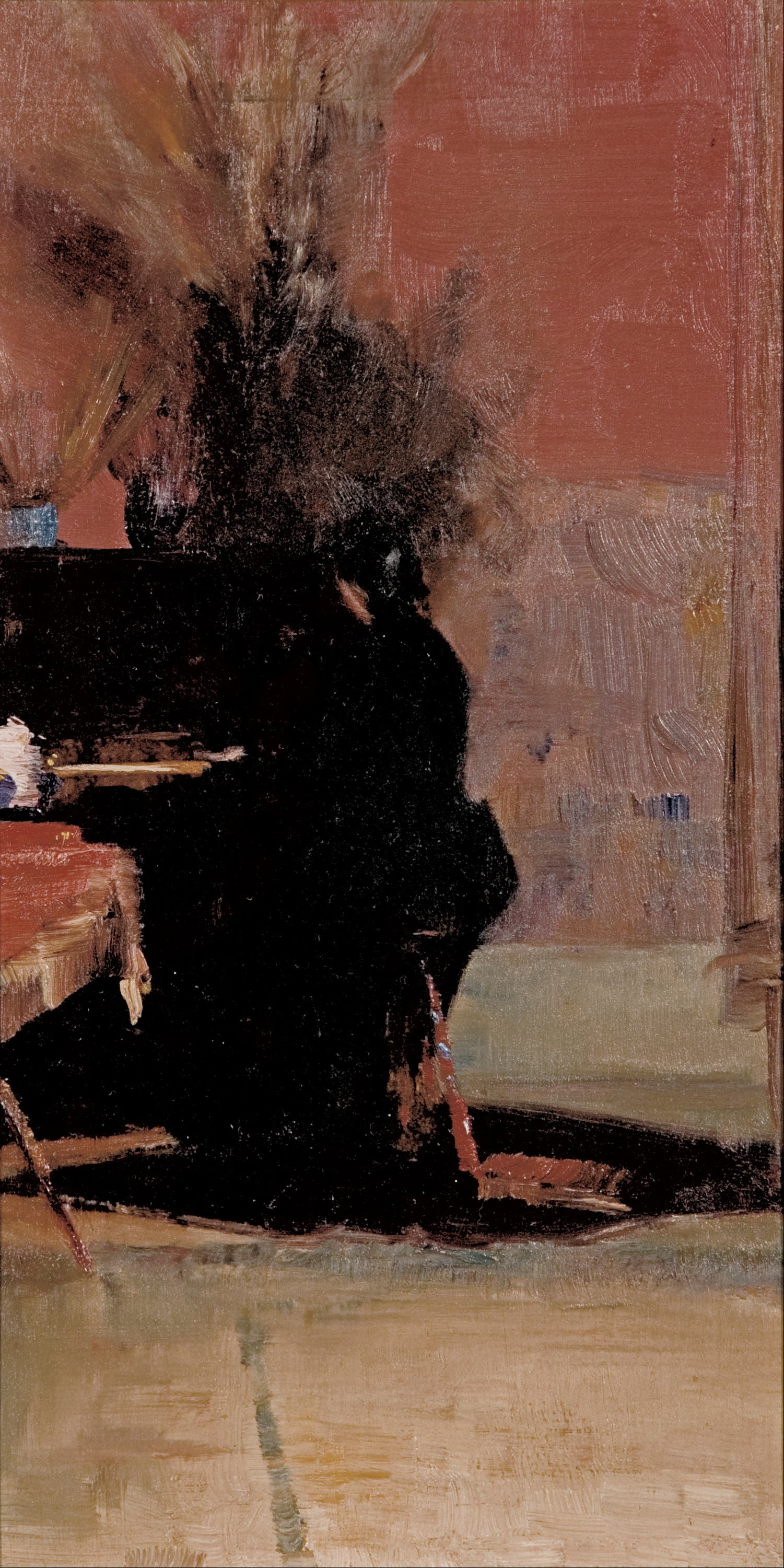
Andante, 1889, Art Gallery of South Australia

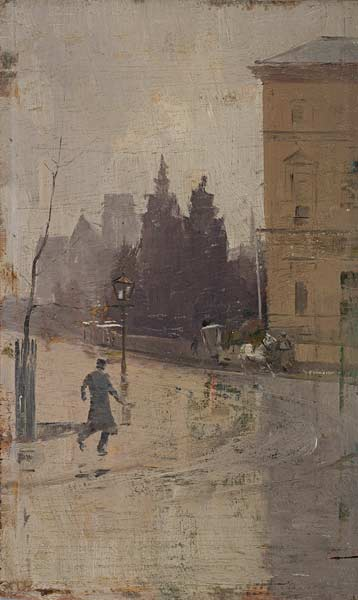
By the Treasury, 1889, National Gallery of Victoria

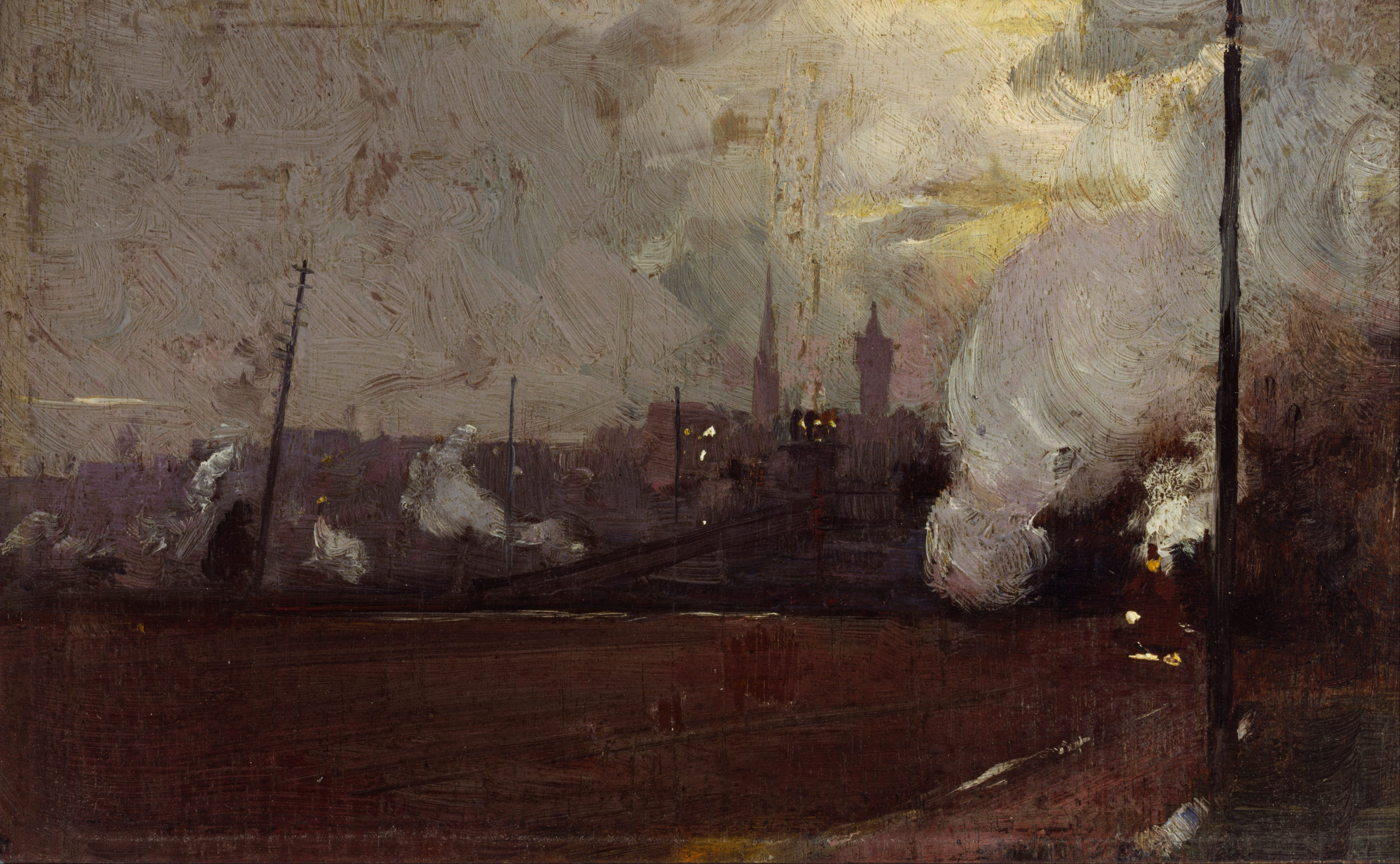
Evening train to Hawthorn, 1889, Art Gallery of New South Wales

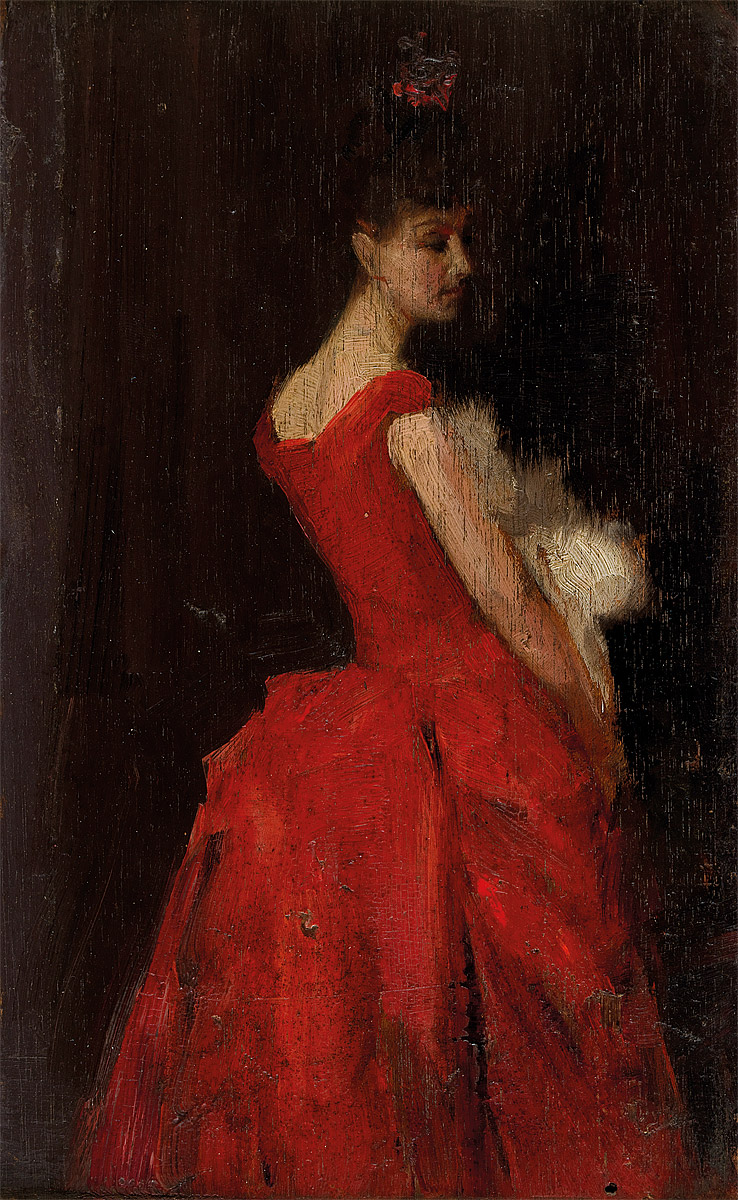
La Favorita, 1889, private collection

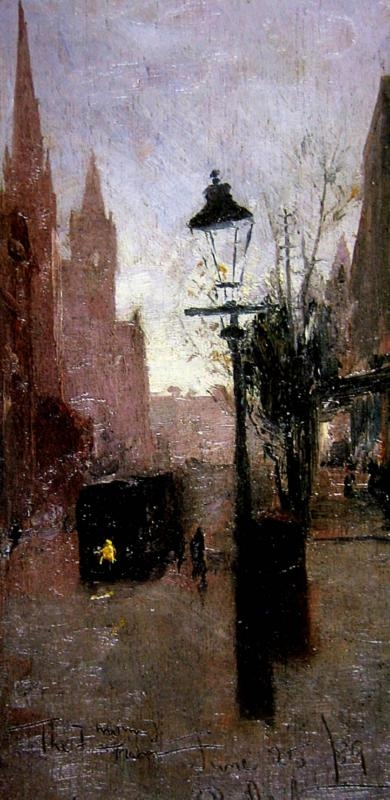
First Tram, 1889, private collection

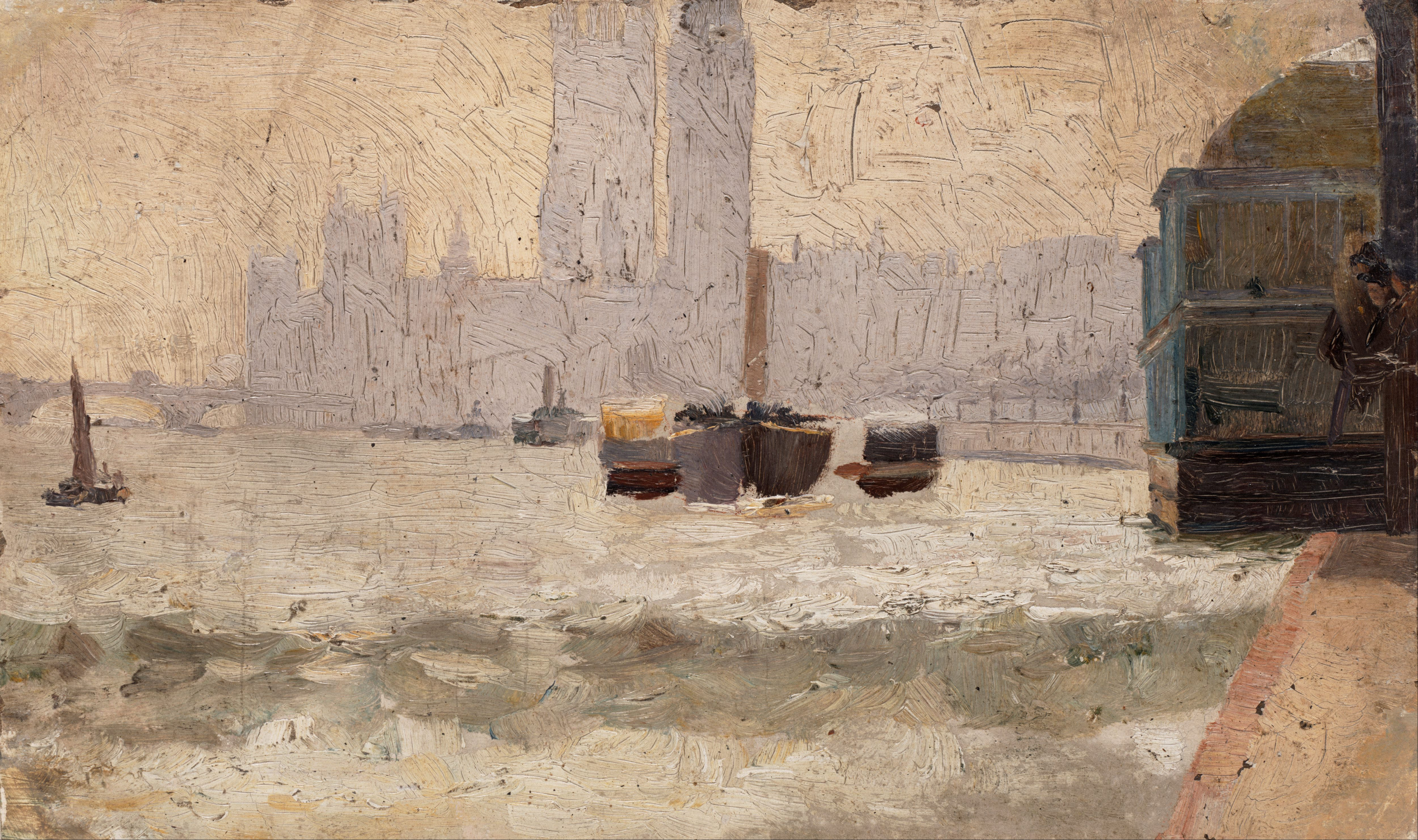
Fog, Thames Embankment, 1884, Art Gallery of New South Wales

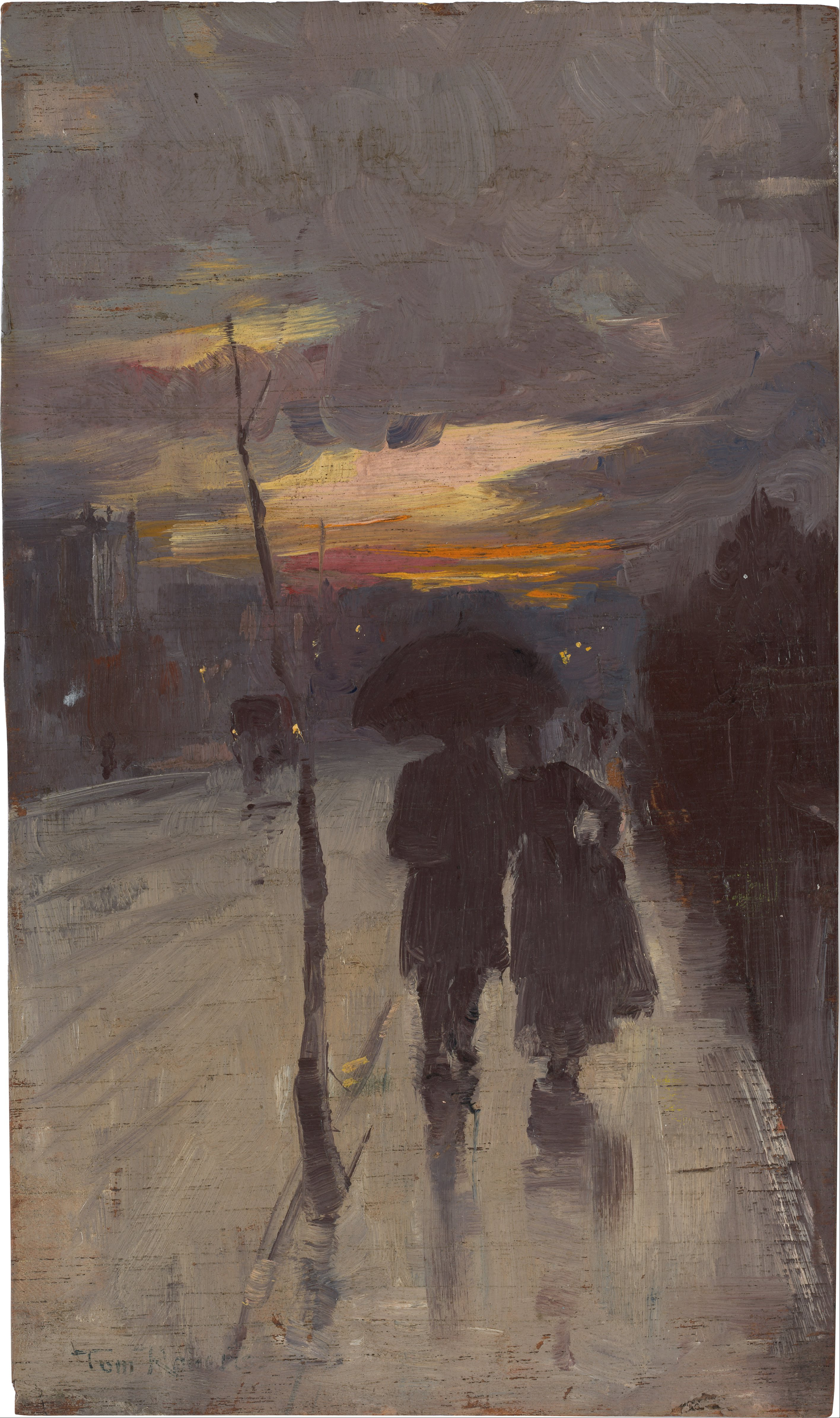
Going Home, 1889, National Gallery of Australia

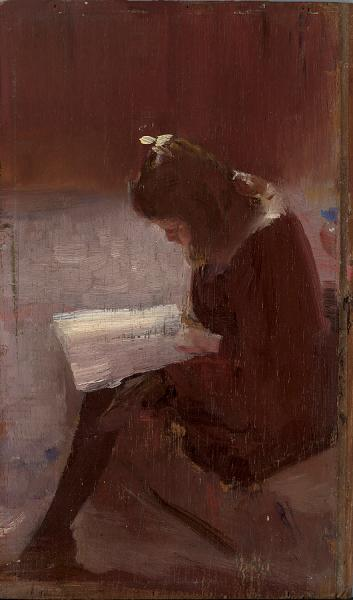
Harper's Weekly, 1889, National Gallery of Victoria

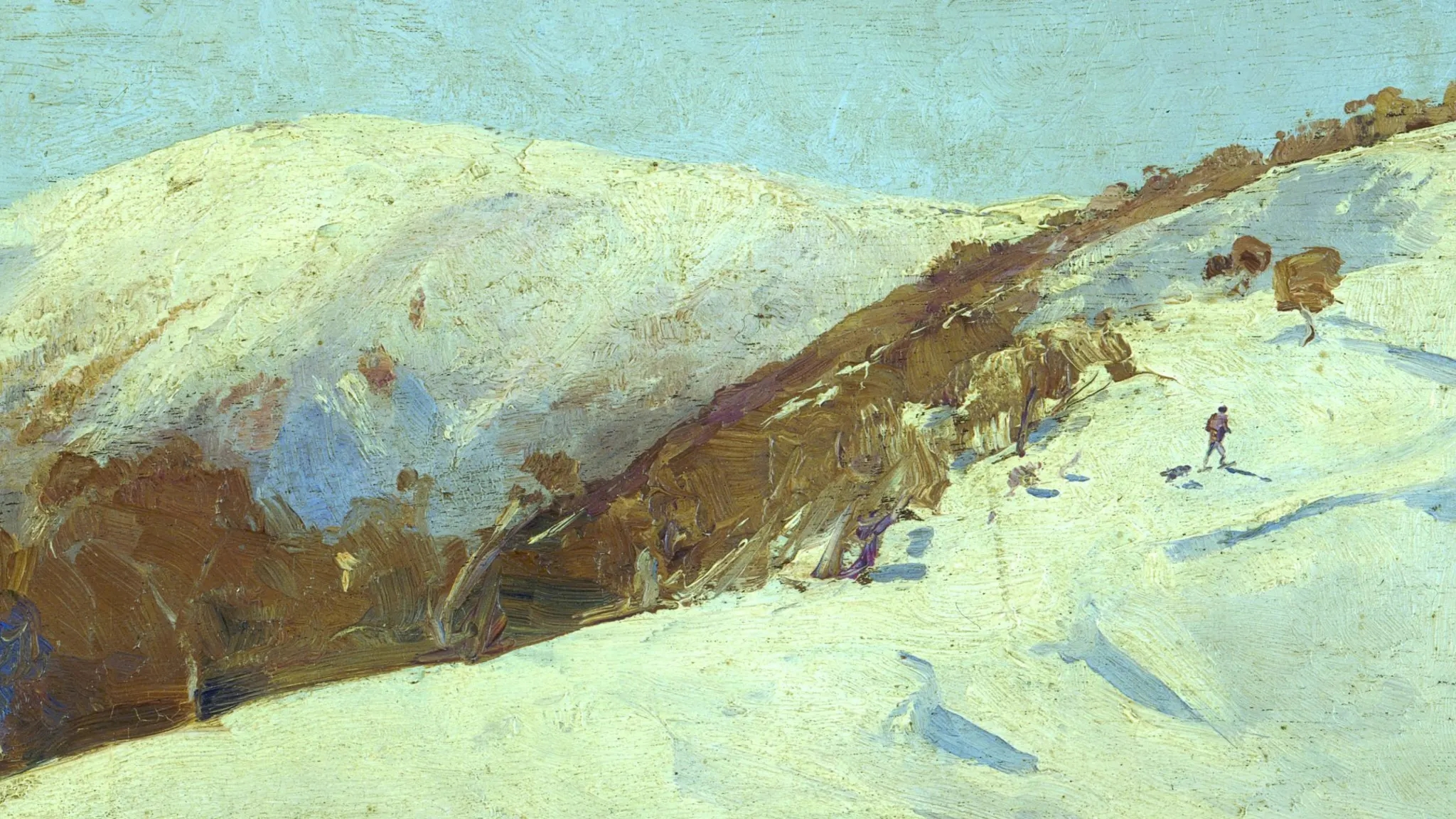
The Mailman to Omeo, 1889, private collection

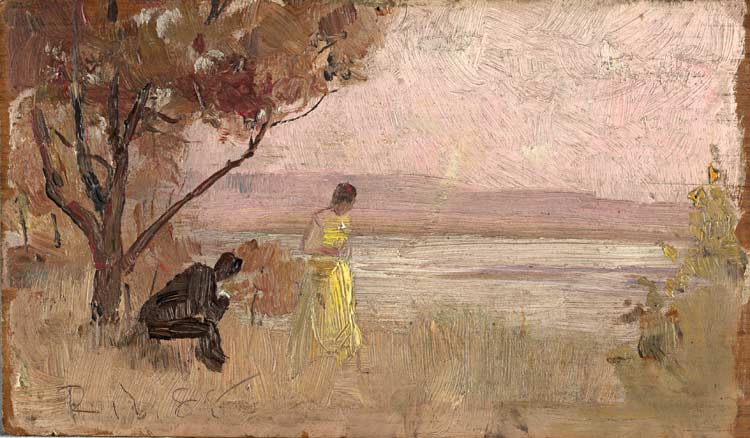
Mentone, 1889, National Gallery of Victoria

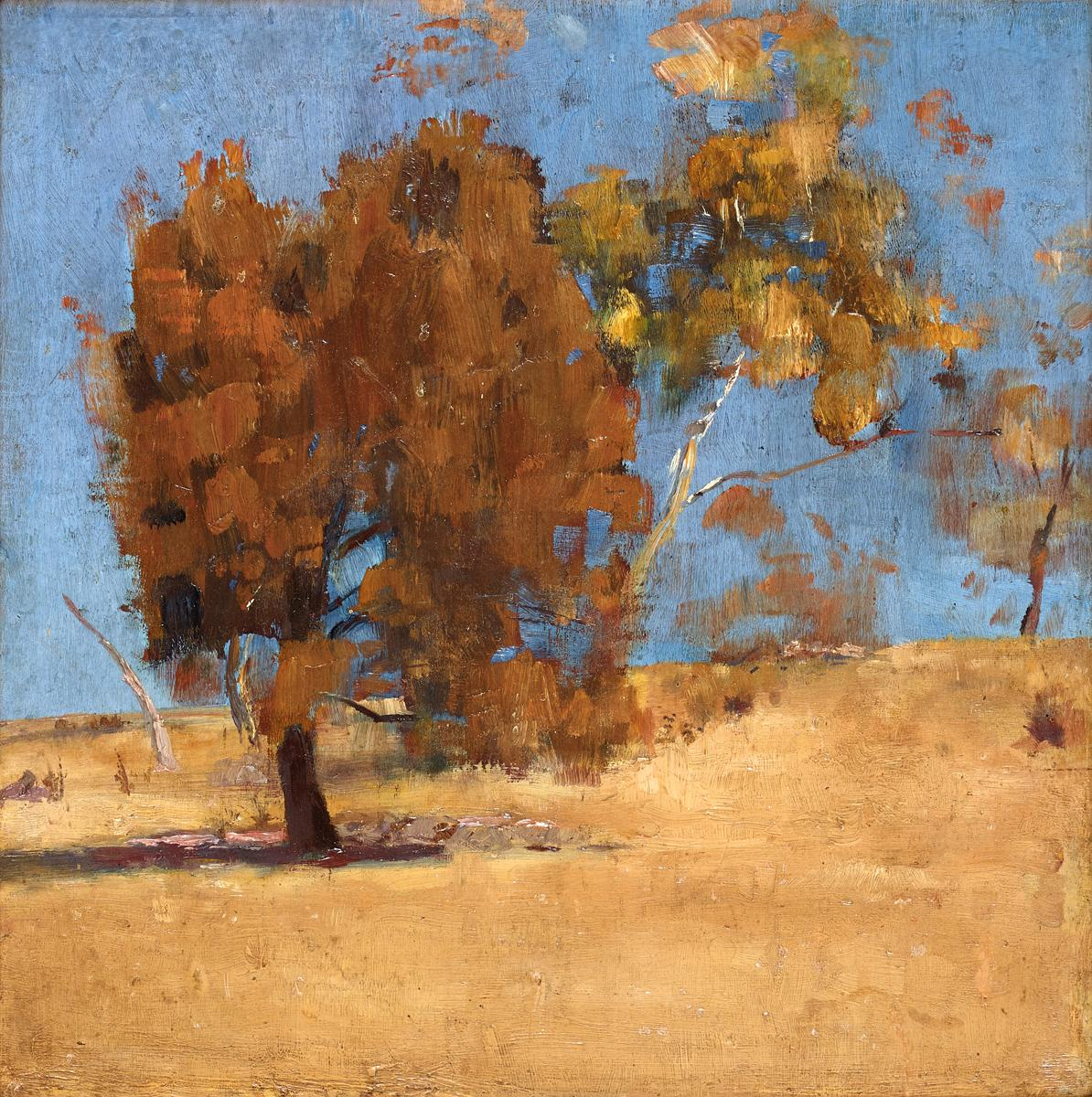
She-Oak and Sunlight, 1889, National Gallery of Victoria

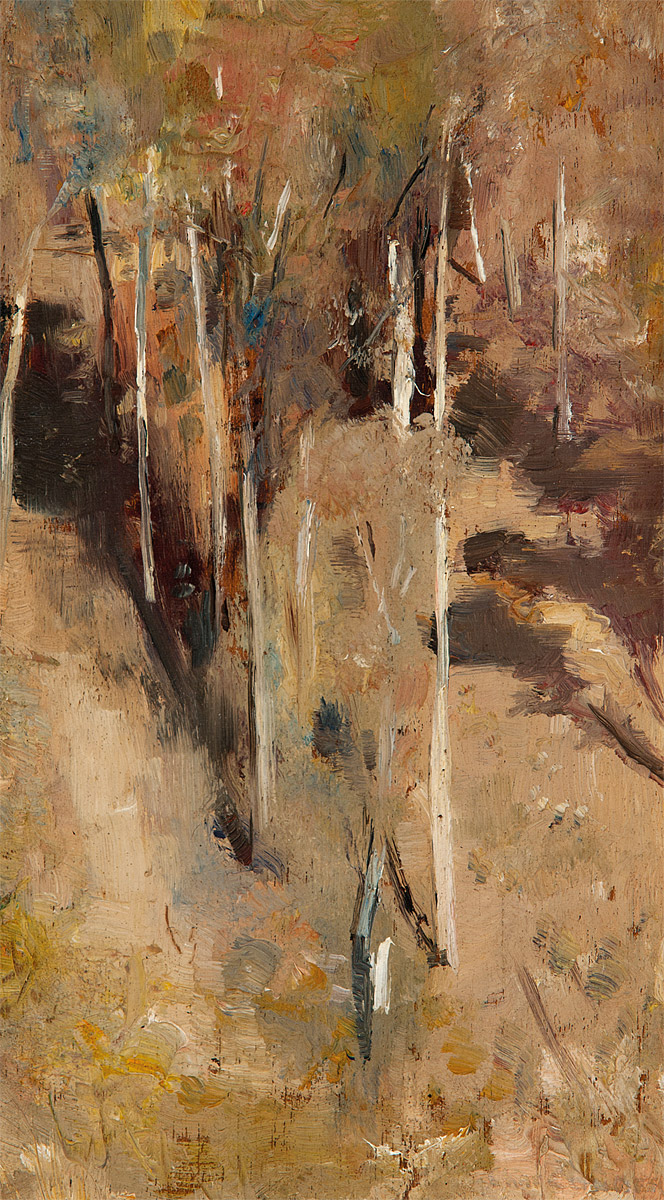
Saplings, 1889, National Gallery of Australia

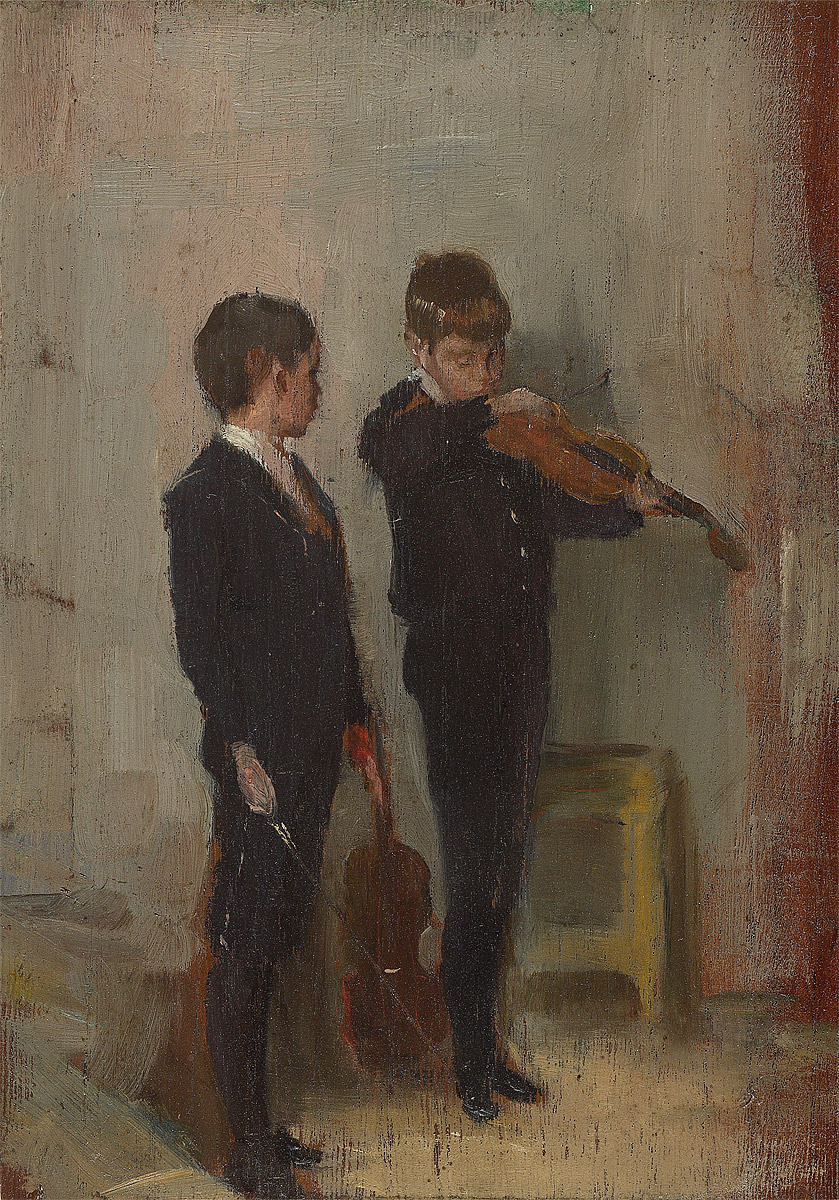
The violin lesson, 1889, National Gallery of Victoria

=== Arthur Streeton ===
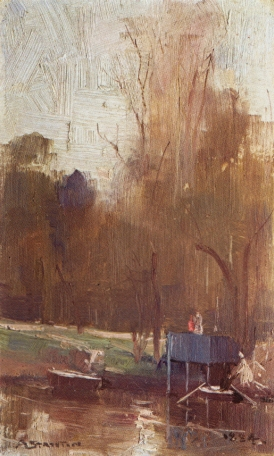
Brander's Ferry, 1889, private collection

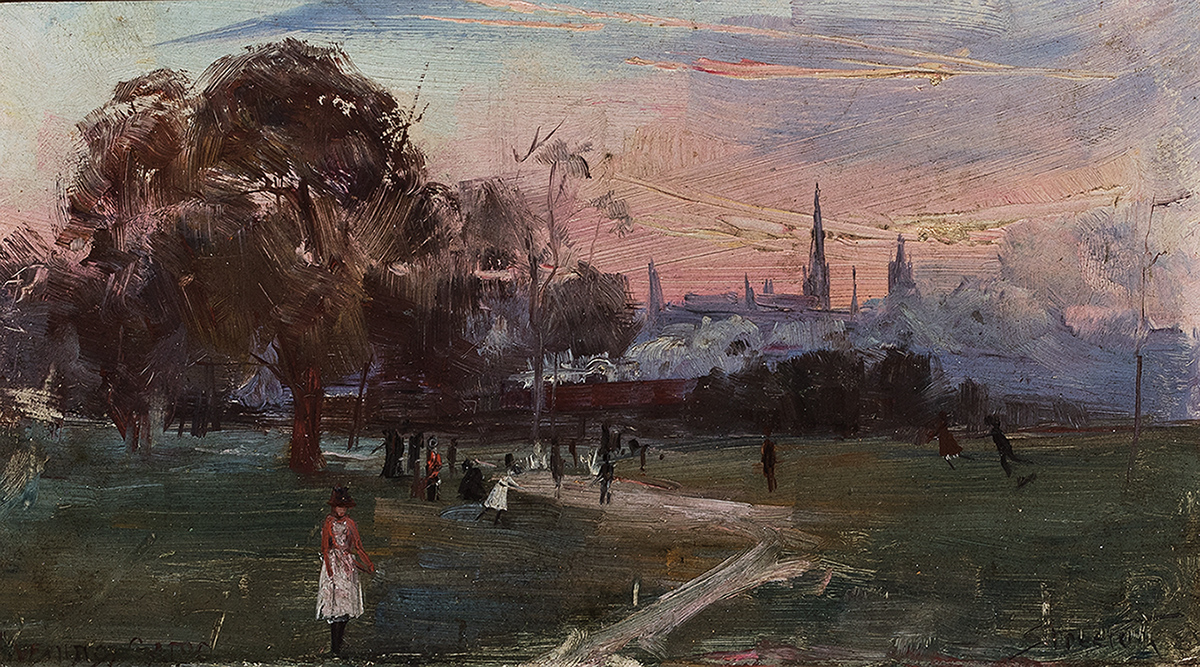
Evening game, 1889, private collection

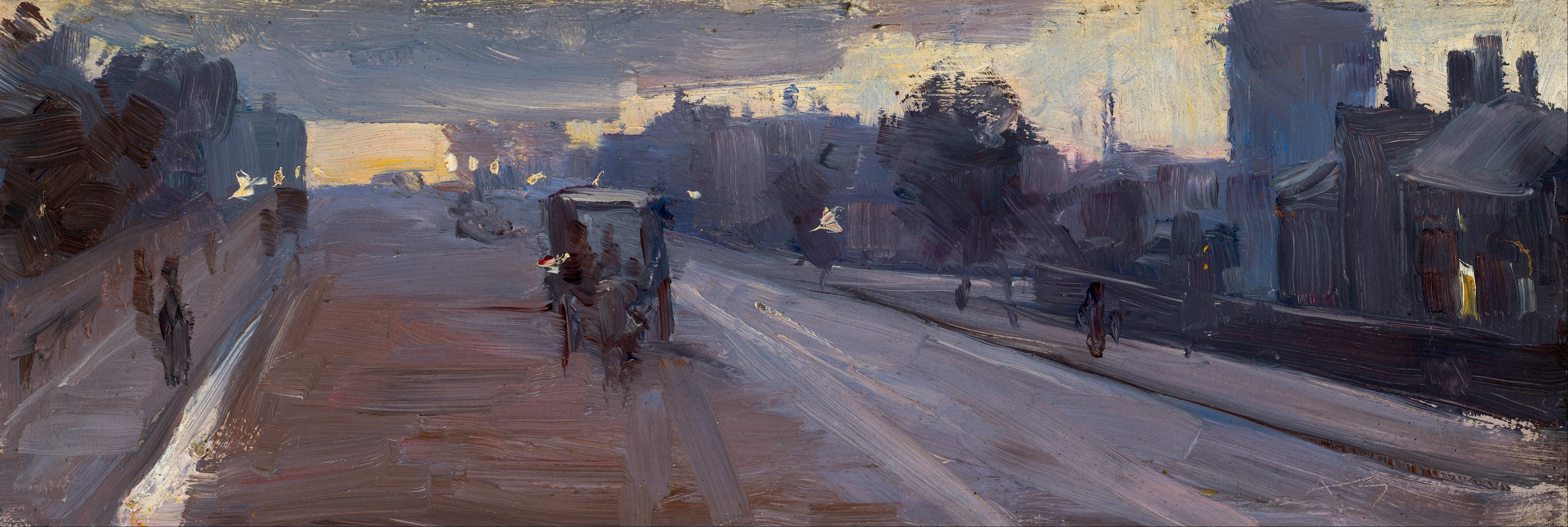
Hoddle Street to Junction, 1889, National Gallery of Australia

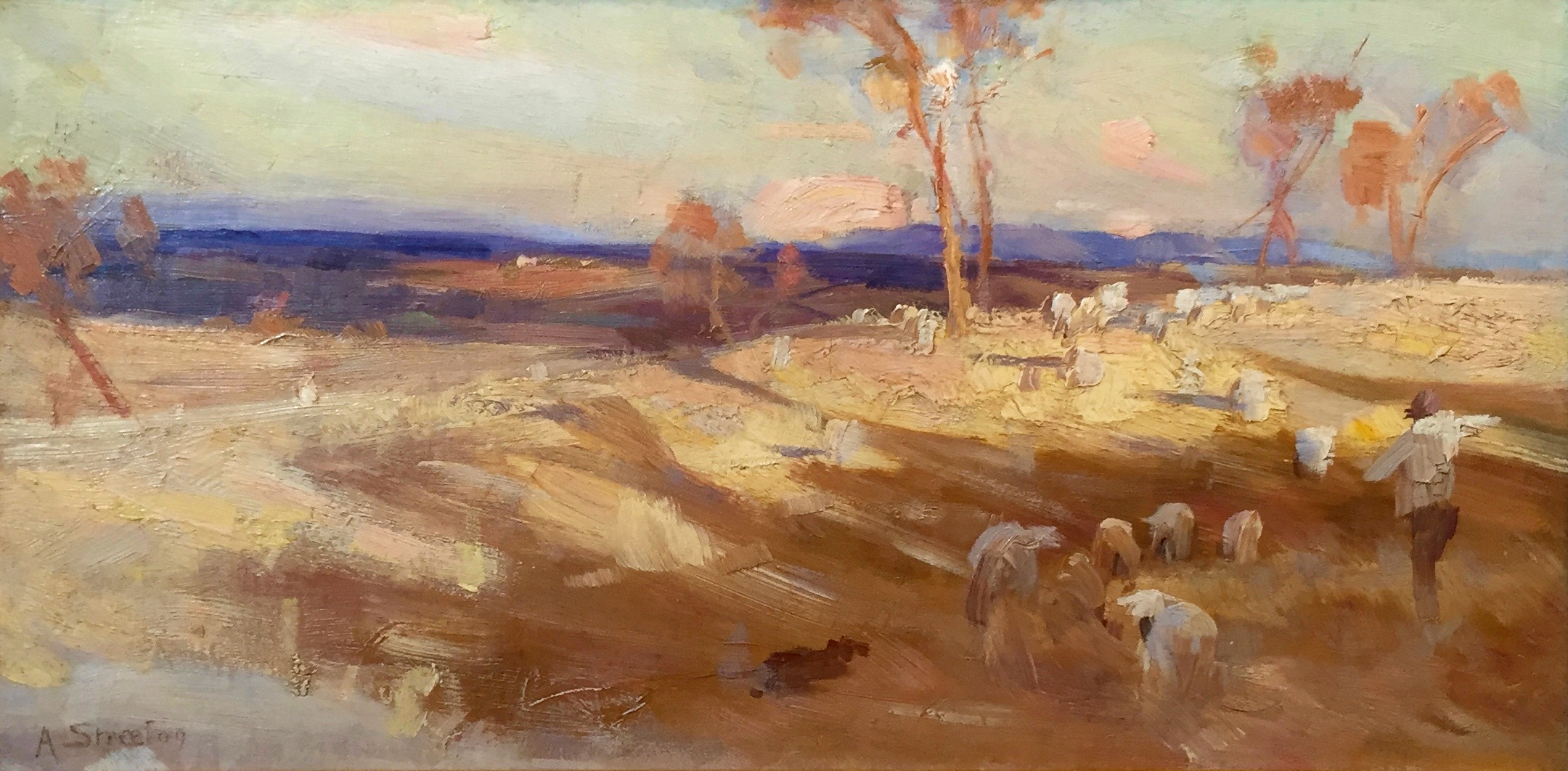
Impression for ′Golden Summer′, 1888, Benalla Art Gallery

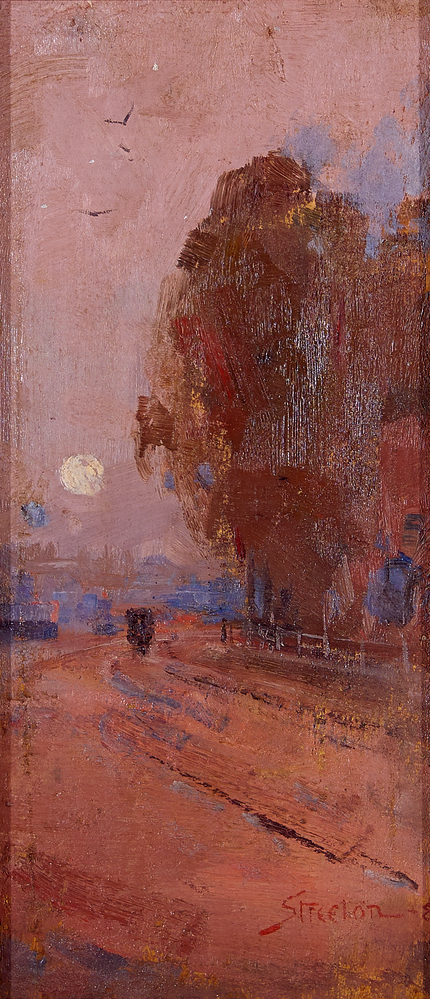
The Long Road, 1889, Shepparton Art Museum

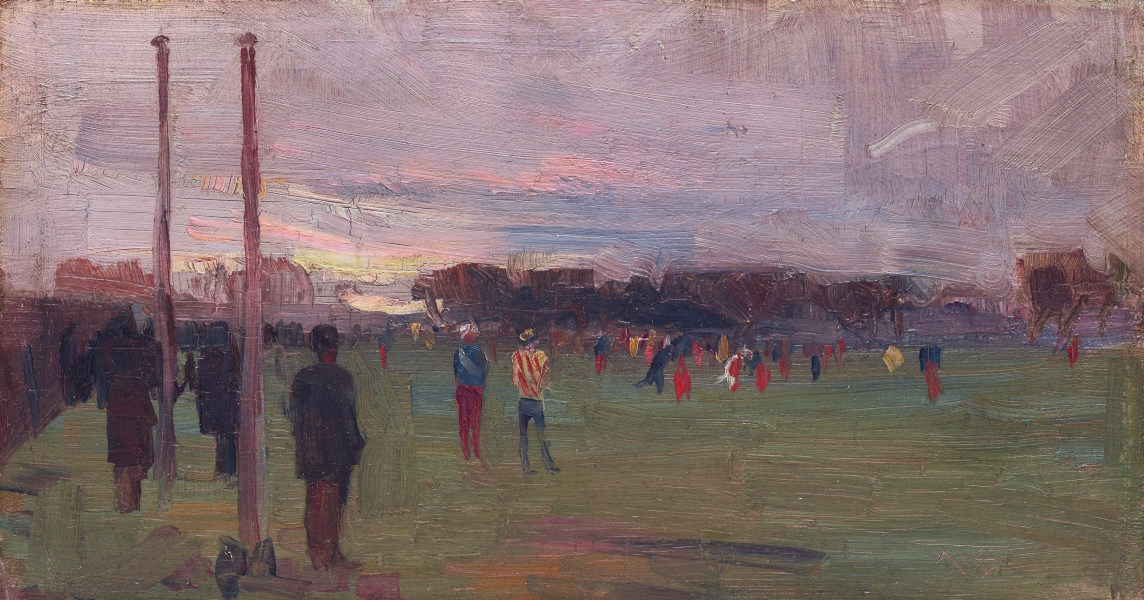
The National Game, 1889, Art Gallery of New South Wales

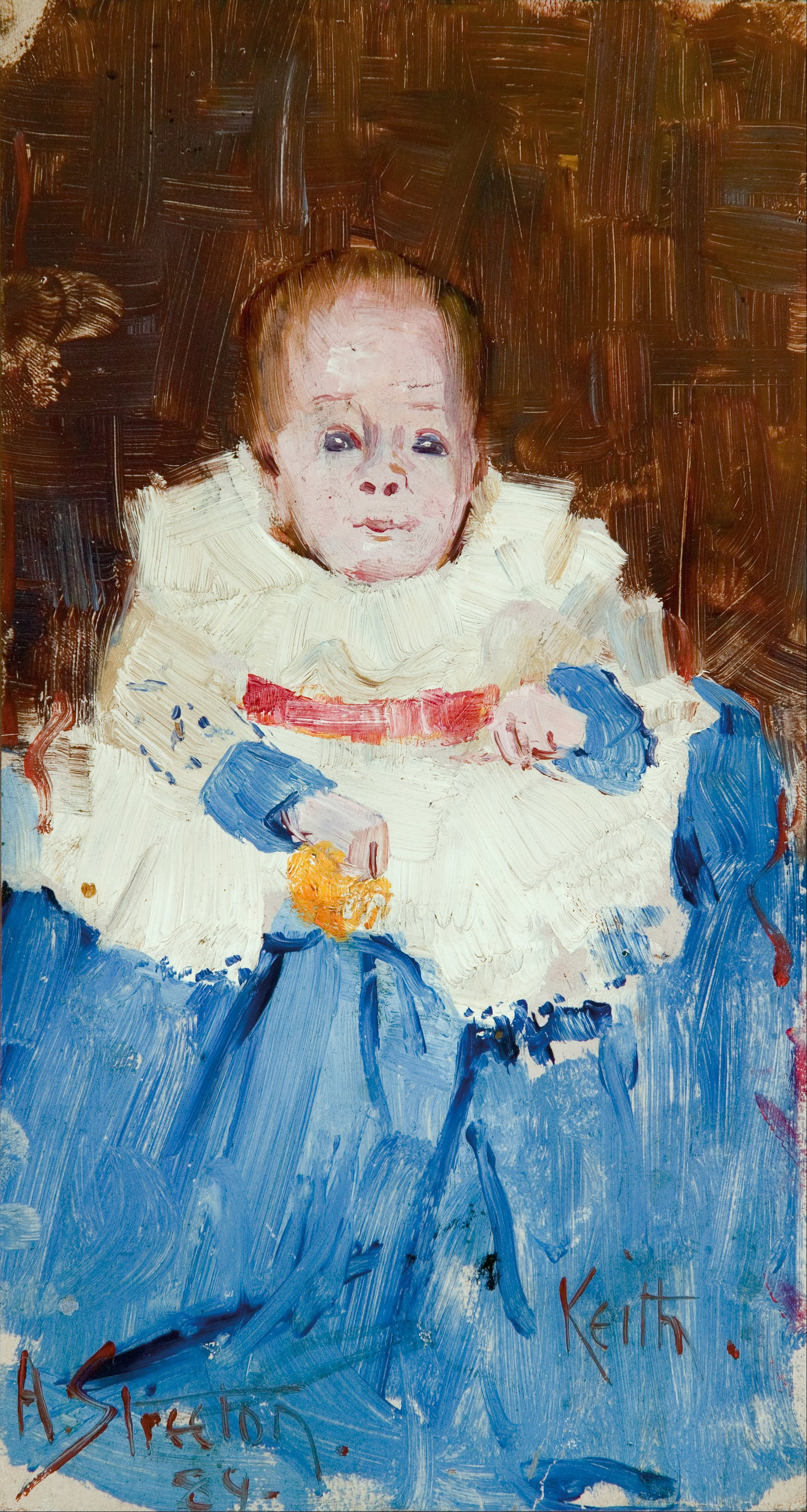
Orange, blue and white, 1889, Art Gallery of South Australia

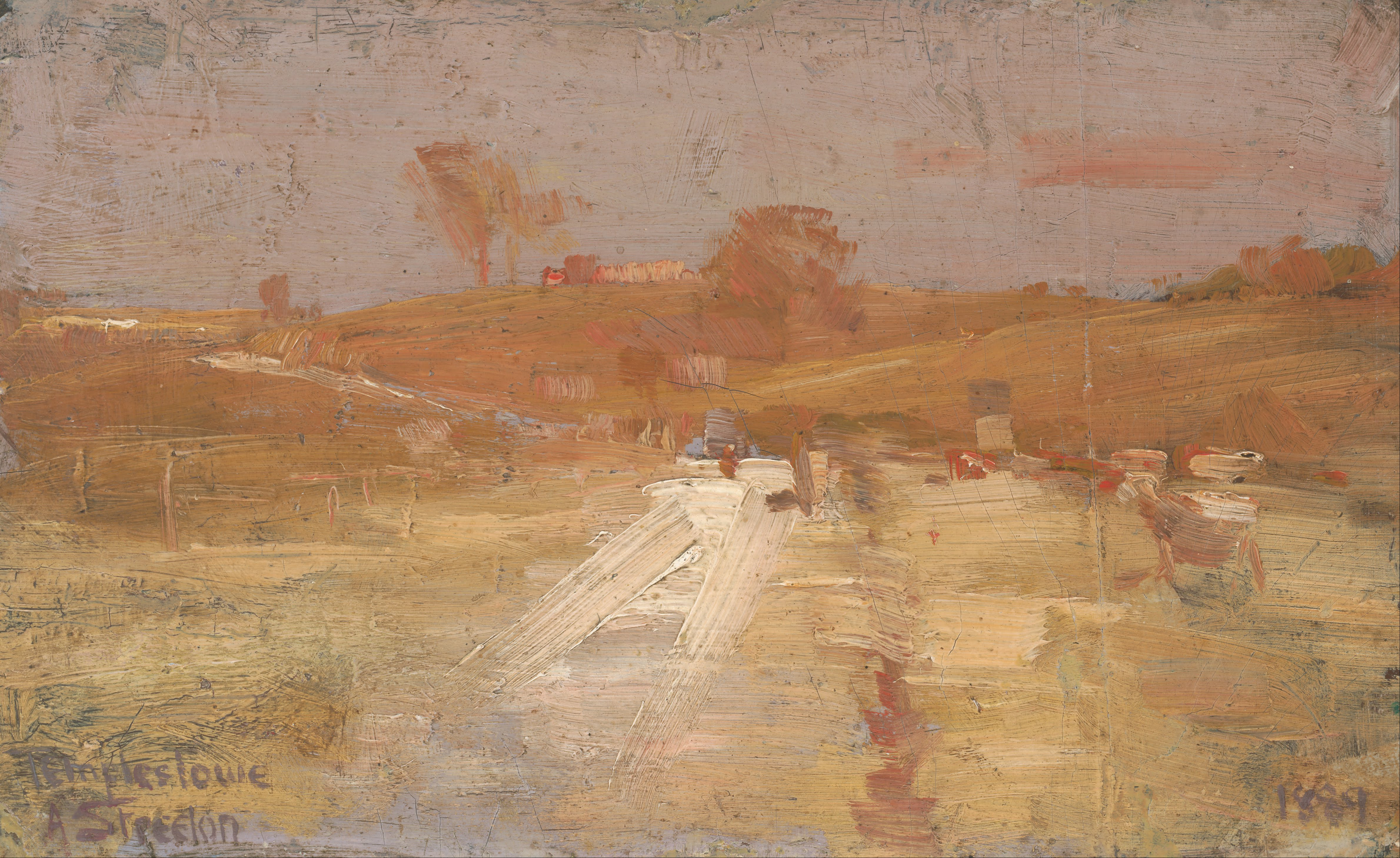
Pastoral in yellow and grey- a colour impression of Templestowe, 1889, National Gallery of Australia

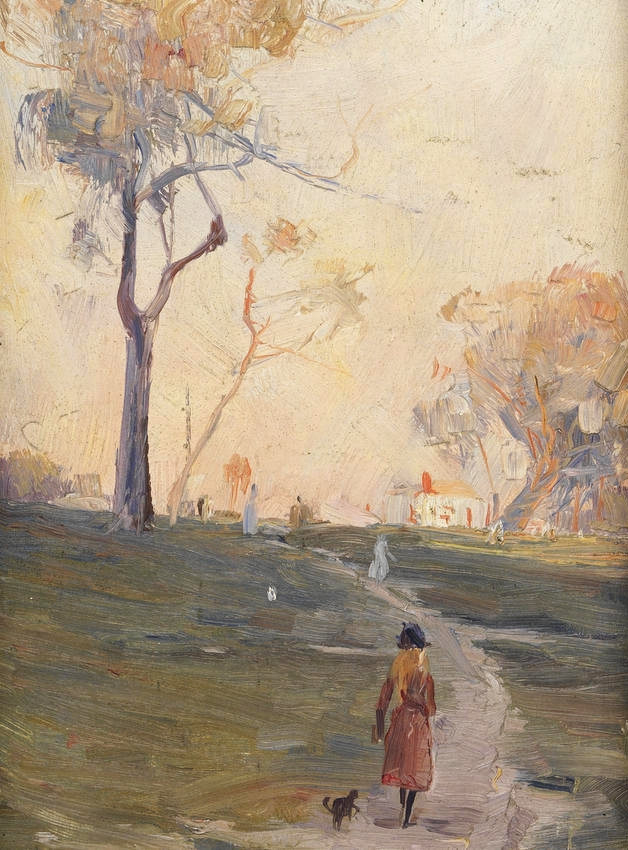
The Road Up the Hill, 1889, Queensland Art Gallery

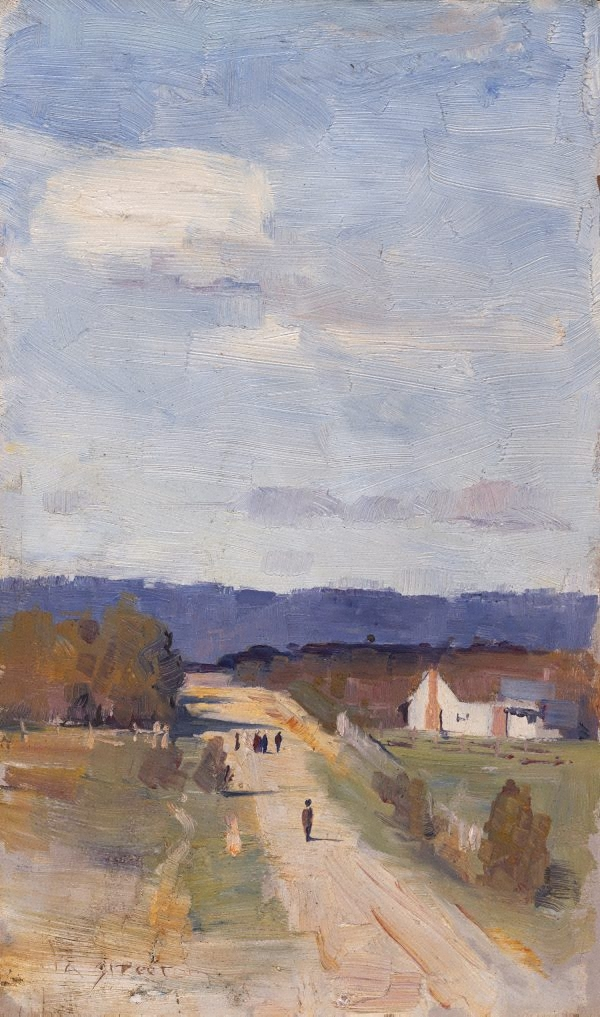
A Road to the Ranges, 1889, Art Gallery of New South Wales

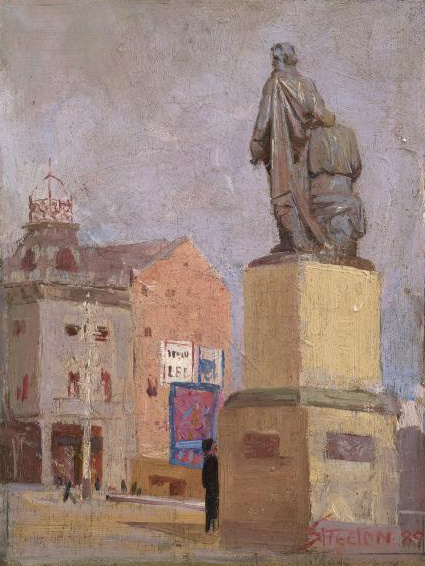
Princess & Burke & Wills, 1889, National Gallery of Victoria

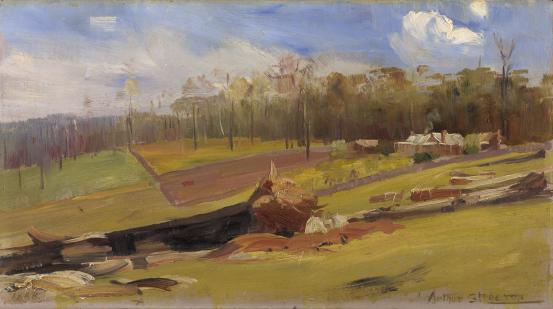
Residence of J. Walker, Esq., Gembrook, 1888, National Gallery of Victoria

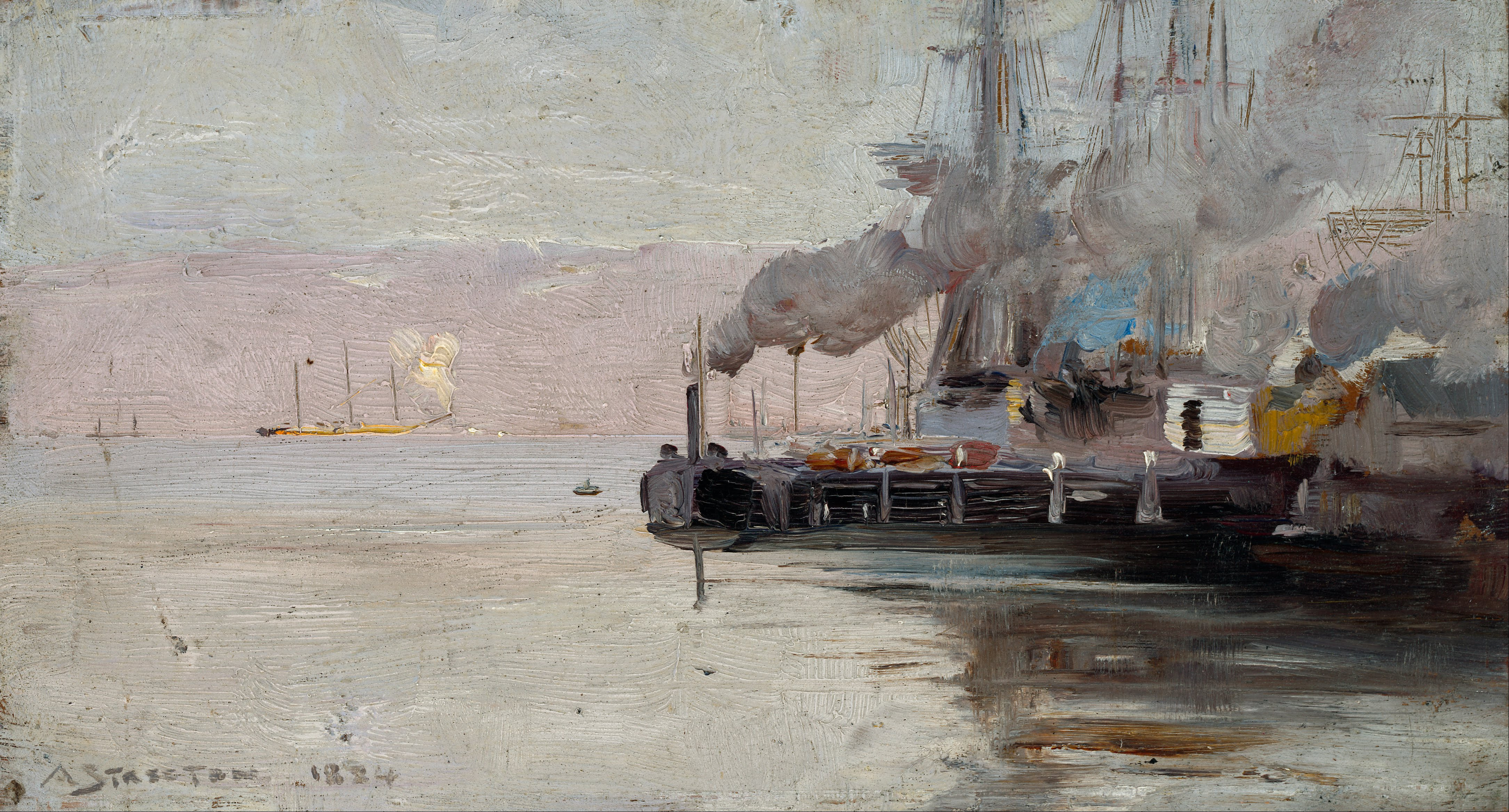
Sandridge, 1888, National Gallery of Australia

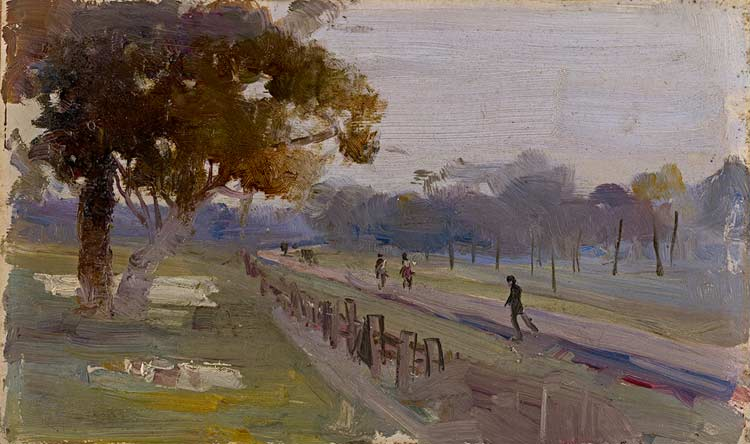
Windy and Wet, 1889, National Gallery of Victoria
