= Sniders & Abrahams =

Australian tobacco manufacturing company

- Industry: Tobacco
- Headquarters: Melbourne, Australia

Sniders & Abrahams was an Australian tobacco manufacturing company formed in 1886 in Melbourne, Victoria. It was the first Australian company to mass-produce cigarettes.

One of the company's owners, Louis Abrahams, played a significant role in Australian colonial art, mainly as a patron and associate of the Heidelberg School movement, also known as Australian impressionism. In the summer of 1885–86, alongside Tom Roberts and Frederick McCubbin, he founded the Box Hill artists' camp, for the purpose of capturing the Australian bush en plein air. The following year, the trio founded a similar camp at bayside Mentone. Perhaps Abrahams' best-known contribution to the movement was through the supply of Sniders & Abrahams cigar-box lids, upon which the artists painted "impressions". These made up the majority of the works in the landmark 1889 9 by 5 Impression Exhibition, named after the dimensions of the lids (9 x 5 inches). In 1903, at the headquarters of Snider & Abrahams on Drewery Lane, Abrahams committed suicide.

A number of the company's buildings in the Melbourne CBD still survive and are now heritage-listed, including what is now known as Pacific House, built in 1903, and the Dovers Building, completed in 1909.

From 1904, Sniders & Abrahams began issuing series of cigarette cards. The company's Australian rules football cards in particular have become highly collectable.

== Gallery ==
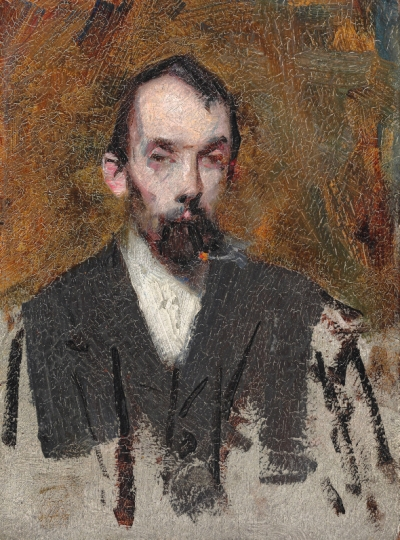
Arthur Streeton's portrait of Abrahams smoking a cigar, c. 1889

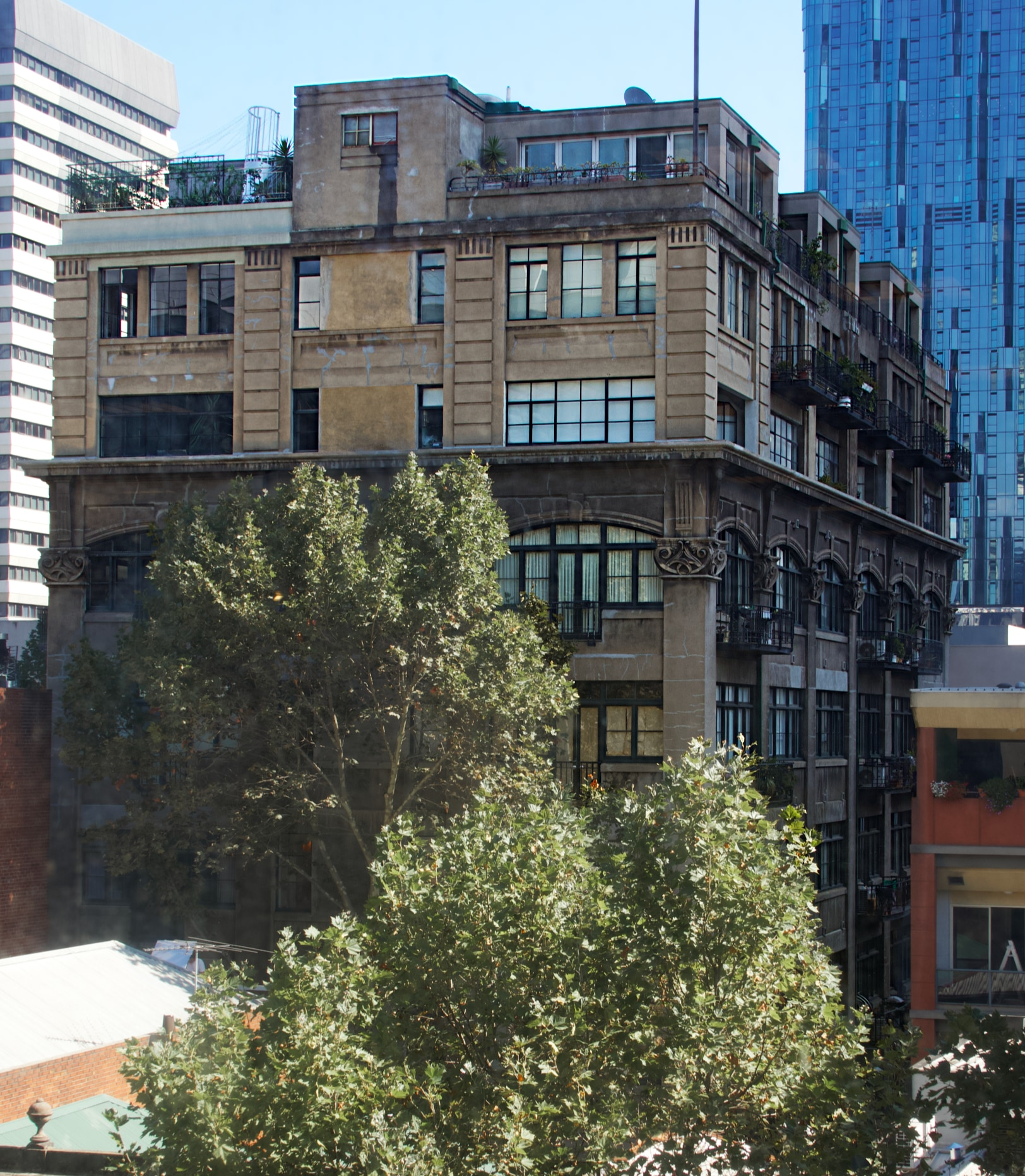
Former Sniders & Abrahams warehouse (now known as Dovers Building), built in 1908

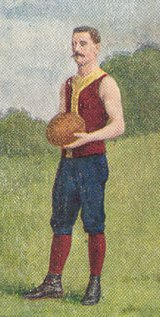
A 1904 Sniders & Abrahams Australian rules football card

== See also ==
- List of cigar brands
- List of cigarette brands
