= Bill Crebbin =

Australian rules footballer (1869–1924)

Personal information
- Full name: William Cottier Crebbin
- Born: 8 March 1869; Ballarat East, Victoria
- Died: 9 December 1924 (aged 55); Cremorne, New South Wales
- Original team: Ballarat

Playing career^{1}
| Years | Club | Games (Goals) |
| 1891–96 | Essendon (VFA) | 54 (6) |
| 1900 | Essendon | 1 (0) |
- ^{1} Playing statistics correct to the end of 1900.

Career highlights
- VFA Premierships 1891, 1892, 1893, 1894

William Cottier Crebbin (8 March 1869 – 9 December 1924) was an Australian rules footballer who played with Essendon in both the Victorian Football Association (VFA) and the Victorian Football League (VFL).

External image
- Mr. W.C. Crebbin, Melbourne Punch.

== Family ==
The son of Thomas Cottier Crebbin (1829-1911), and Ellen Crebbin (1844-1922), née McLean, William Cottier Crebbin was born at Ballarat East, Victoria on 8 March 1869.

He married Margaret Elizabeth Maude White (1873-1958) in June 1895.

== Football ==
"I never saw anyone so ticklish as Bill Crebbin, the Essendon centre man. He would jump out of his skin if you touched him in the ribs. One day, on the old East Melbourne ground, Bill was waiting just outside the pack when [former North Melbourne footballer] Joe Shaw, the umpire, was about to bounce the ball. One of his own side tickled Crebbin. He jumped forward, more than a yard, head down, and butted the umpire, knocking him over. Crebbin apologised profusely, but it took a lot of explanation to mollify Shaw." — R.W.E. Wilmot, 9 September 1939.

== Death ==
He died at Cremorne, New South Wales on 9 December 1924.

== Football card ==
In 2018 an Australian rules football card featuring Essendon player Bill Crebbin published by the American Tobacco Company in 1894 sold for $10,110 on EBay in Australia.
