= Australian rules football card =

Type of trading card

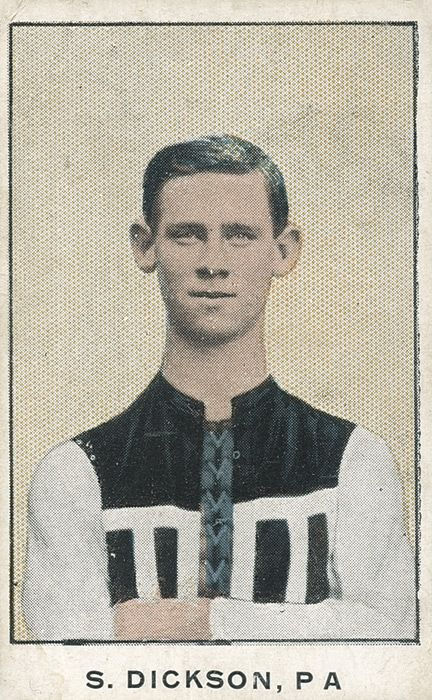
- 1906 Dungey Ralph Sweet Nell cigarette card featuring Port Adelaide player Sinclair Dickson
- Other names: Footy card
- Type: Trading card
- Invented by: Goodwin & Company
- Company: Select; Team Coach
- Country: Australia
- Availability: 1880s–present
- Materials: Cardboard, silk, plastic
- Features: Australian rules football

An Australian rules football card (colloquially referred to as a Footy card) is a type of trading card relating to Australian rules football, usually printed on cardboard, silk, or plastic. These cards feature one or more Australian rules football players. Cards are almost exclusively found in Australia as no top-level leagues are present outside the country. Prices for Australian rules football cards can be very high. This is illustrated for both vintage and modern cards such as an 1894 American Tobacco Company card featuring Essendon player Will Crebbin which sold for $10,110 in 2018 and a 2004 Select AFL Conquest Triple Brownlow Medallist signature card featuring Nathan Buckley, Adam Goodes and Mark Ricciuto which was valued at $3,000 in 2018.

== History ==
=== Pre-1900 ===
1894 American Tobacco Company Celebrities cigarette card featuring South Adelaide player Jack McGaffin

The first Australian rules football cards were produced in conjunction with Goodwin & Co's Old Judge Cigarettes in the late 1880s. Early Australian rules football cards are distinguished from carte de visite portrait photograph cards as the former were for mass commercial dissemination whilst the latter were often for personal use. The Goodwin & Co's set included Australian rules footballers from Victoria and South Australia. The Old Judge cards are hard to find due to the photographs on the cards fading substantially over time.

Another set from this period was produced by the American Tobacco Company 'celebrities' from 1894. The celebrities set included famous Australians. An original copy of a card from this set featured Essendon player Bill Crebbin which sold for $10,110 in 2018.

=== 1900–1920 ===
Other companies that issued earlier football cards were W.D. & H.O. Wills in 1905, and Sniders & Abrahams (featuring scenes of matches in 1908 and then releasing other sets with portraits of football players in the 1910s, all in full colour).

W.D. & H.O. Wills also released illustrated sets displaying clubs flags and colours (1908 and 1913) through the Capstan brand.

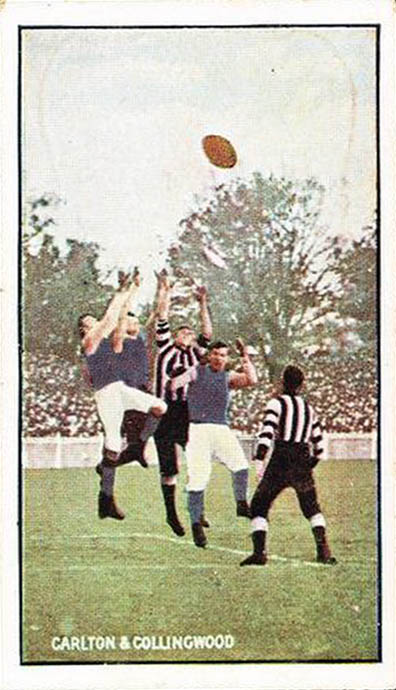
1908 Sniders & Abrahams Standard Cigarettes "Incidents in Play" featuring Carlton playing Collingwood.

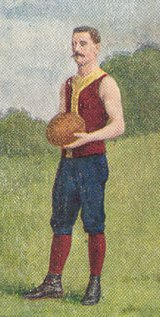
1904 Sniders & Abrahams Standard Cigarettes Australian Footballers (Series A) cigarette card.

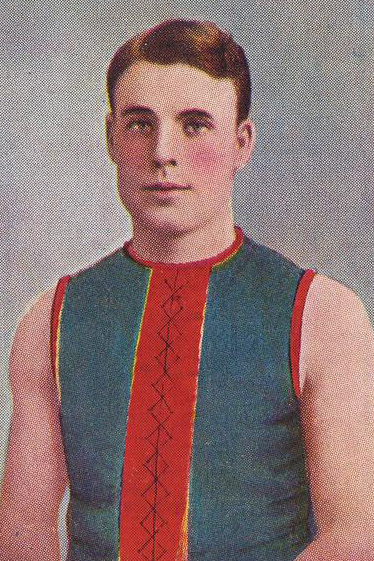
1905 W.D. & H.O. Wills Past & Present Champions cigarette card featuring Melbourne player Jack Gardiner.

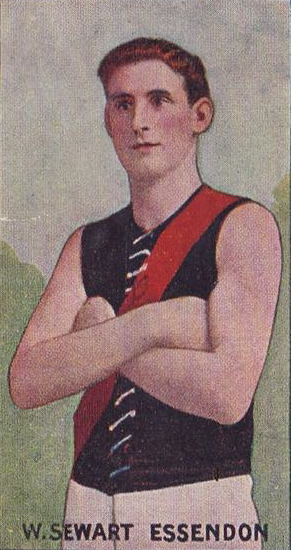
1907 Sniders & Abrahams Standard Cigarettes Australian Footballers (Series C, VFL) cigarette card featuring Essendon player Bill Sewart.

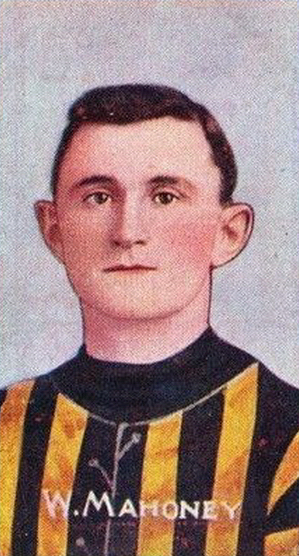
1909 Sniders & Abrahams Standard Cigarettes Australian Footballers (Series D, VFL) cigarette card featuring Richmond player William Mahoney.

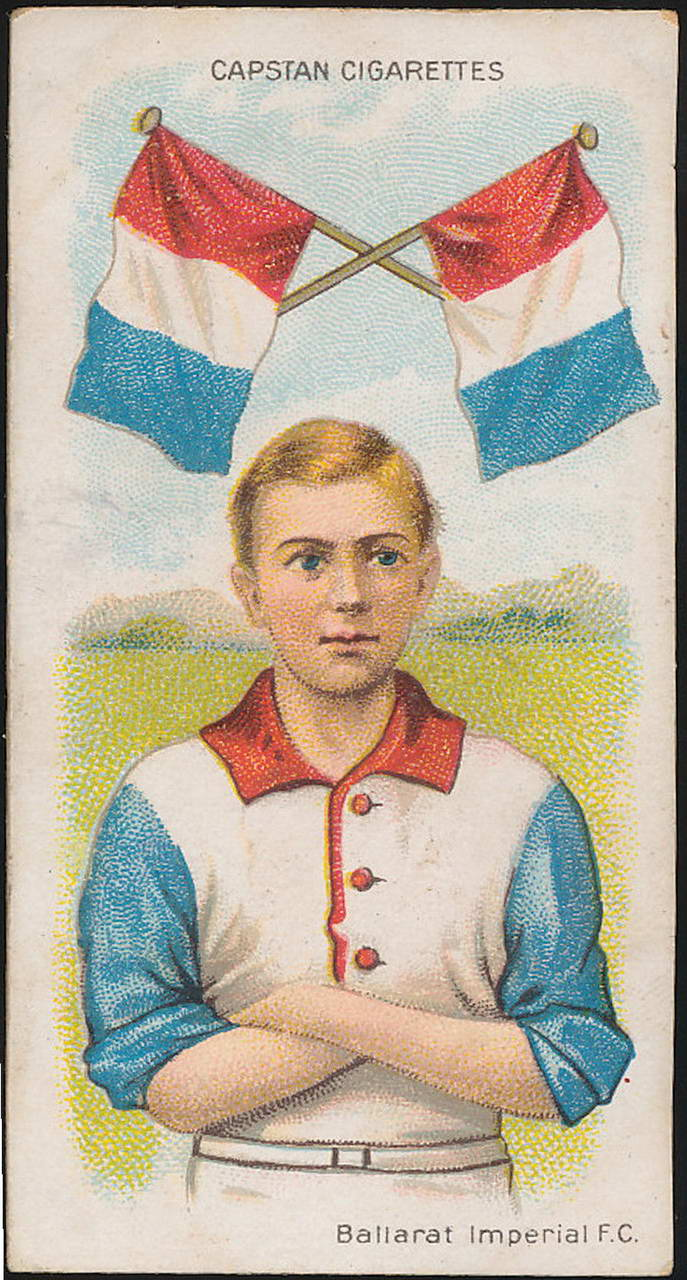
1913 W.D. & H.O. Wills Club Colours and Flags cigarette card featuring Ballarat Imperial.

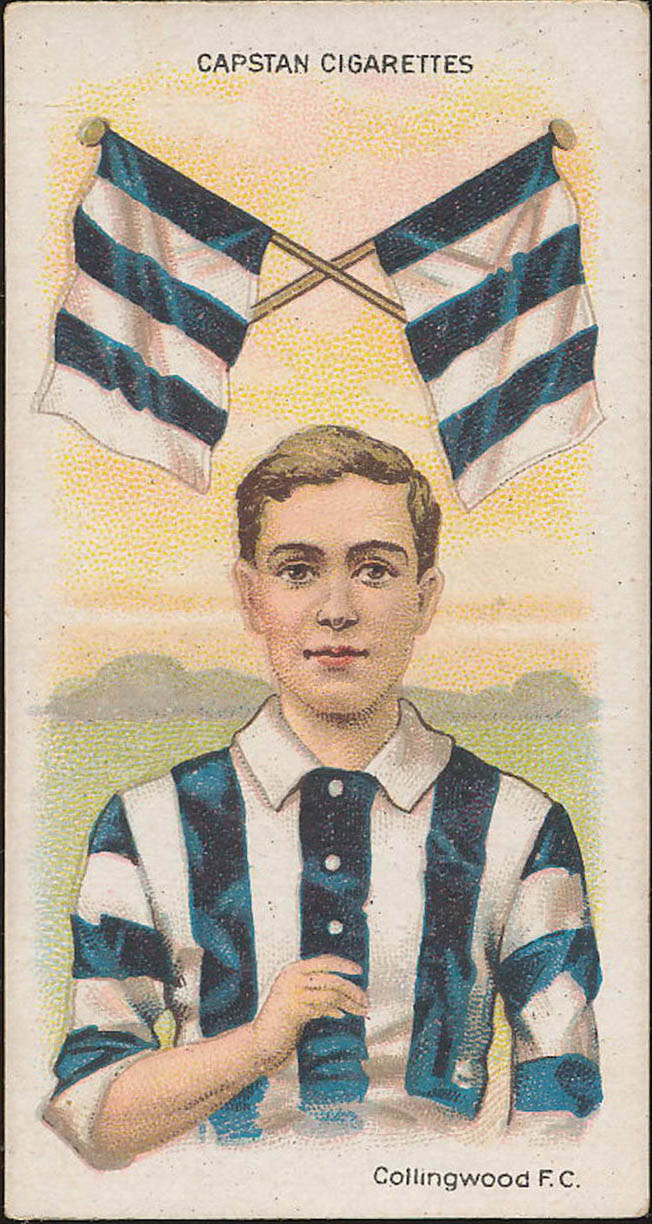
1913 W.D. & H.O. Wills Club Colours and Flags cigarette card featuring Collingwood.

=== 1920–1930 ===
In the 1920s one of the most distinctive sets was the 1922 McIntyre Bros cards that featured a tartan design.

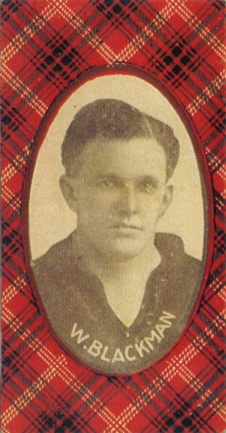
1922 McIntyre Bros Football Champions Series 2 trading card featuring Carlton player Billy Blackman.

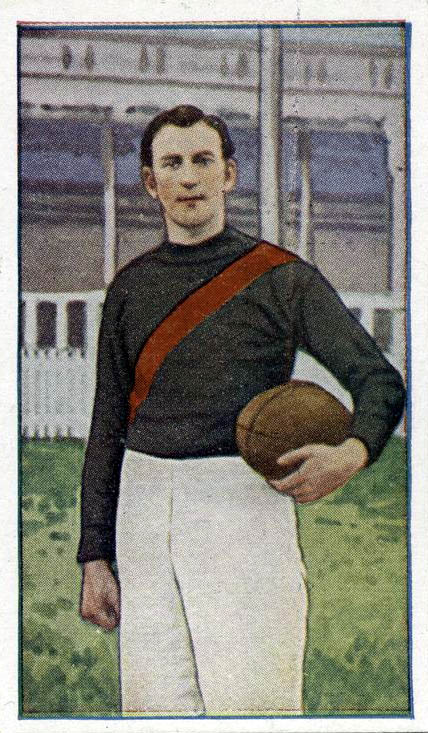
1922 J.J. Schuh Magpie Cigarettes Victorian League Footballers cigarette card featuring Essendon player Fred Baring.

=== 1930–1950 ===
In the 1930s, the Australian division of British Godfrey Phillips Co. released a set of football cards. By the same time, Hoadleys, a local confectionery company, released a set of illustrated cards. Another confectionery company, Clarke-Ellis, also released its own set of cards.

Other companies that launched cards sets in the 1930s were Pals Periodical, Plaistowe & Co., Carreras (two illustrated sets in 1933, the first of them with footballers caricatures by Bob Miram), Giant Licorice Cigarettes, MacRobertson's and W.D. & H.O. Wills, among others.

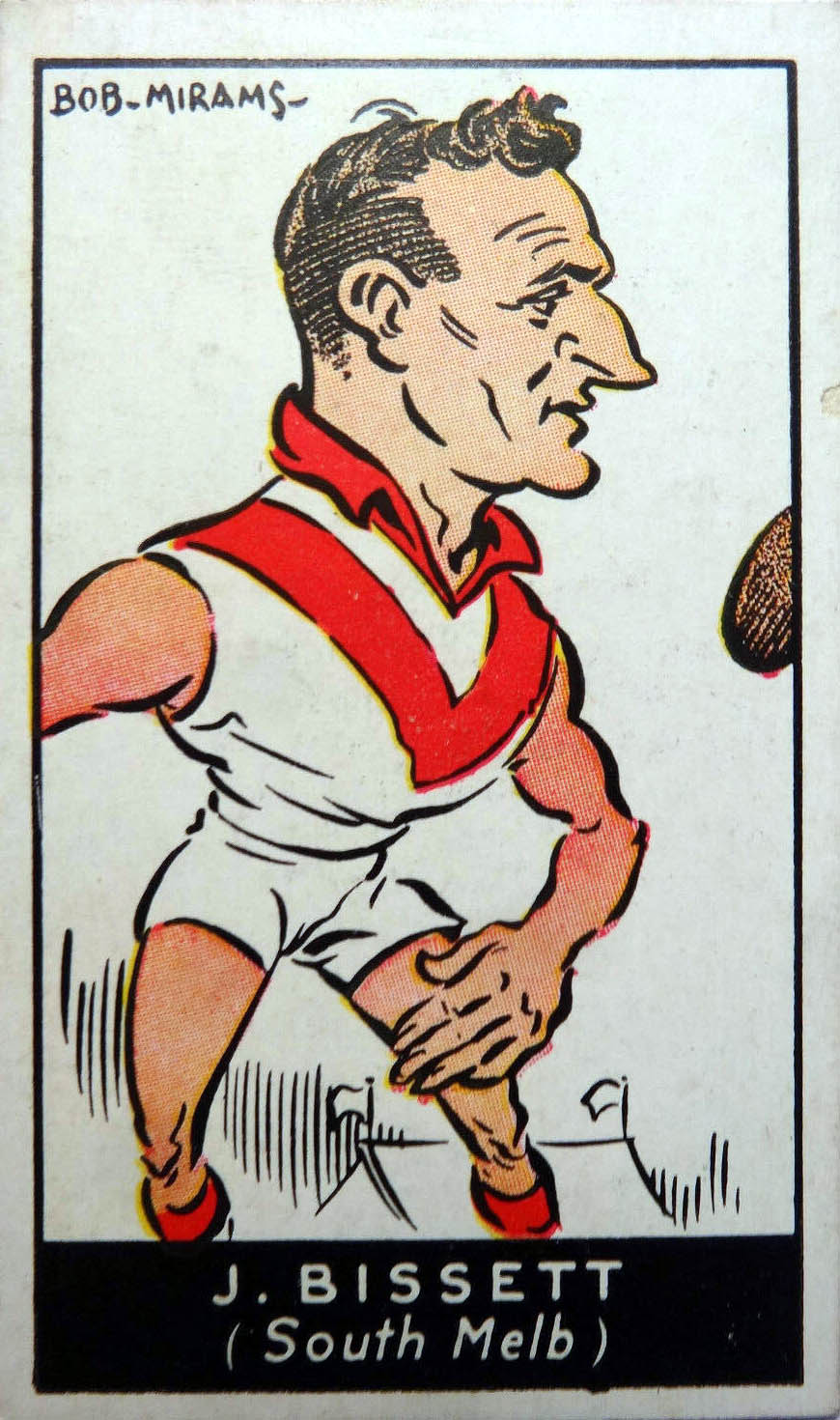
1933 Carreras Tobacco Company Football Series Bob Miram's Caricatures cigarette card featuring South Melbourne player Jack Bissett.

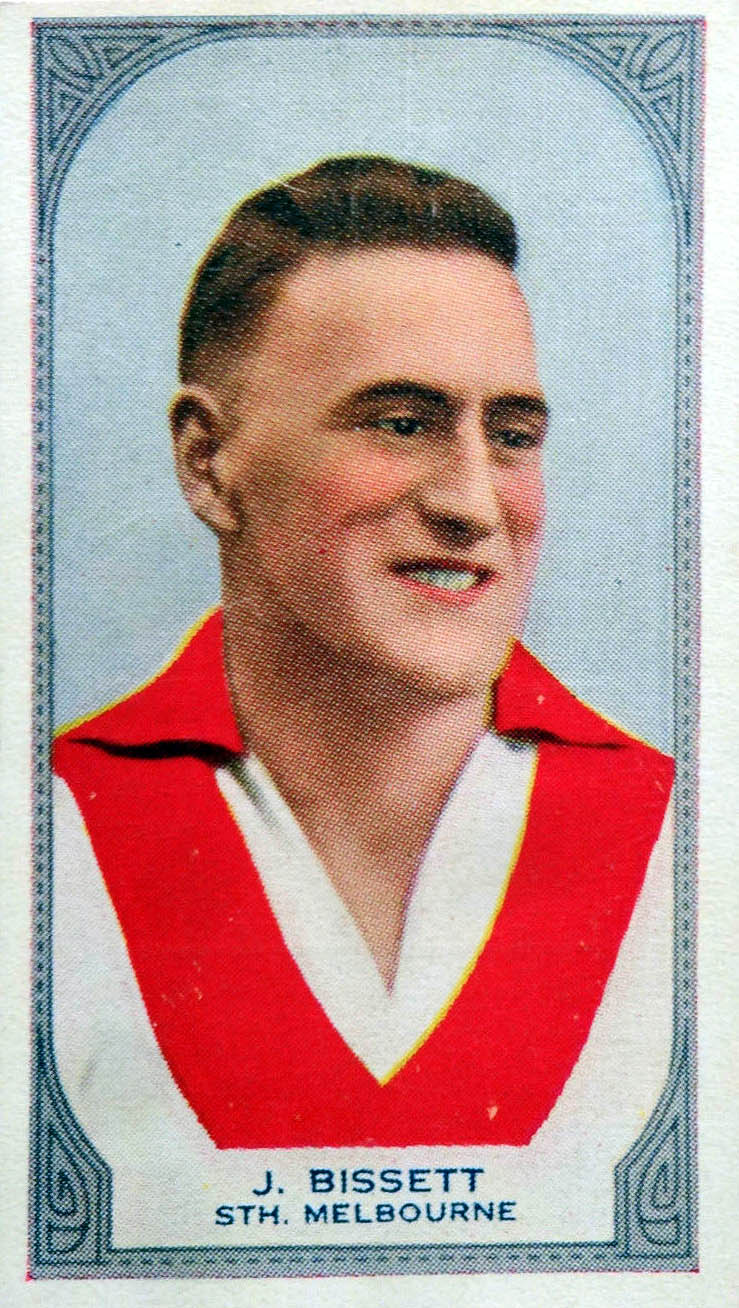
1933 Hoadley's Chocolates Victorian Footballers trading card featuring South Melbourne player Jack Bissett.

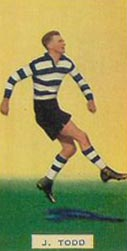
1934 Hoadley's Chocolates Victorian League Footballers trading card featuring Geelong player George Todd.

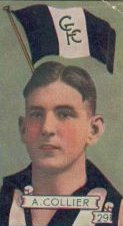
1934 Allen's League Footballers trading card featuring Collingwood player Albert Collier.

=== 1950–1990 ===
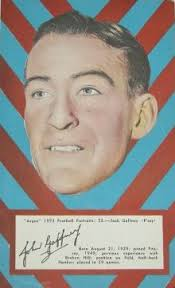
1954 Argus Newspaper Football Portraits trading card featuring Fitzroy player Jack Gaffney

During this period it was common for Australian rules football cards to be sold with confectionary, specifically bubble gum. The most popular set of Australian rules football cards is usually considered to be the 1963 Scanlens card set. The most valuable card from the 1963 Scanlens set is that of Graham "Polly" Farmer due to its rarity caused by a printing defect seeing many of that card discarded at production. A 1963 Scanlens Graham "Polly" Farmer card has been recorded selling for $7,200 on eBay.

It is not uncommon for single Scanlens cards to sell for more than $1,000.

A South Australian set produced by AMSCOL featured die-cut cards of SANFL players under the lids of the company's large ice cream tins. Due to poor promotion, many people never knew that the cards were included and most were thrown away with the packaging.

=== 1990–present ===
Beginning in the 1990s, packets of Australian rules football cards started to include special inserts such as signature cards. In 1991, the Stimorol set was the last issue of Australian rules football cards to come with chewing gum.

In 1994, Select issued a set called Cazaly Classics, after Roy Cazaly, that focused on spectacular marks.

To coincide with the 100th season of the VFL/AFL competition, Select created a Hall of Fame set which is credited with causing a boom in the collecting of Australian rules football cards.

In 2019, a premium set of Select cards featured an insert card featuring signatures from David Parkin, Leigh Matthews, Kevin Sheedy, and Ron Barassi, all four-time VFL/AFL premiership coaches. This card has been valued at $10,000.

During 2020, "box breaks" or "group breaks" exploded in popularity for Australian rules football cards, often involving people online buying a 1/18th share of a box, usually aligned to an AFL club.

As a result of better awareness of the hobby due to social media, there has been an increase in the popularity of Australian rules football cards.

Buying cards online has negatively impacted physical card stores.

== Producers ==
=== Licensed producers of cards. ===
- AFL Team Coach: AFL Team Coach cards are part of an annual set with numbers allocated to each card for games. They are not a collector card. These cards are often targeted specifically to kids.

=== Former ===
- American Tobacco Company
- Godfrey Phillips
- Goodwin & Company
- J J Schuh Tobacco Co
- Sniders & Abrahams
- W.D. & H.O. Wills
- Select Cards

== Record public sales ==
	Date	Price (AUD)	Card	Ref
1	2022, February 2	$50,000	2021, Select Supremacy 1000+ Goalkicker Quad Signature (Tony Lockett, Jason Dunstall, Doug Wade, Gary Ablett)	
2	2018, April 17	$10,110	1894, American Tobacco Company, Bill Crebbin, Essendon	
3	2021, August 22	$9,500	2019, Select Supremacy Quad Coach Signature (David Parkin, Ron Barassi, Leigh Matthews, Kevin Sheedy)	
4	2014, June 12	$7,200	1963, Scanlens Gum, Graham Farmer, Geelong	

== Gallery ==
Australian rules football cards
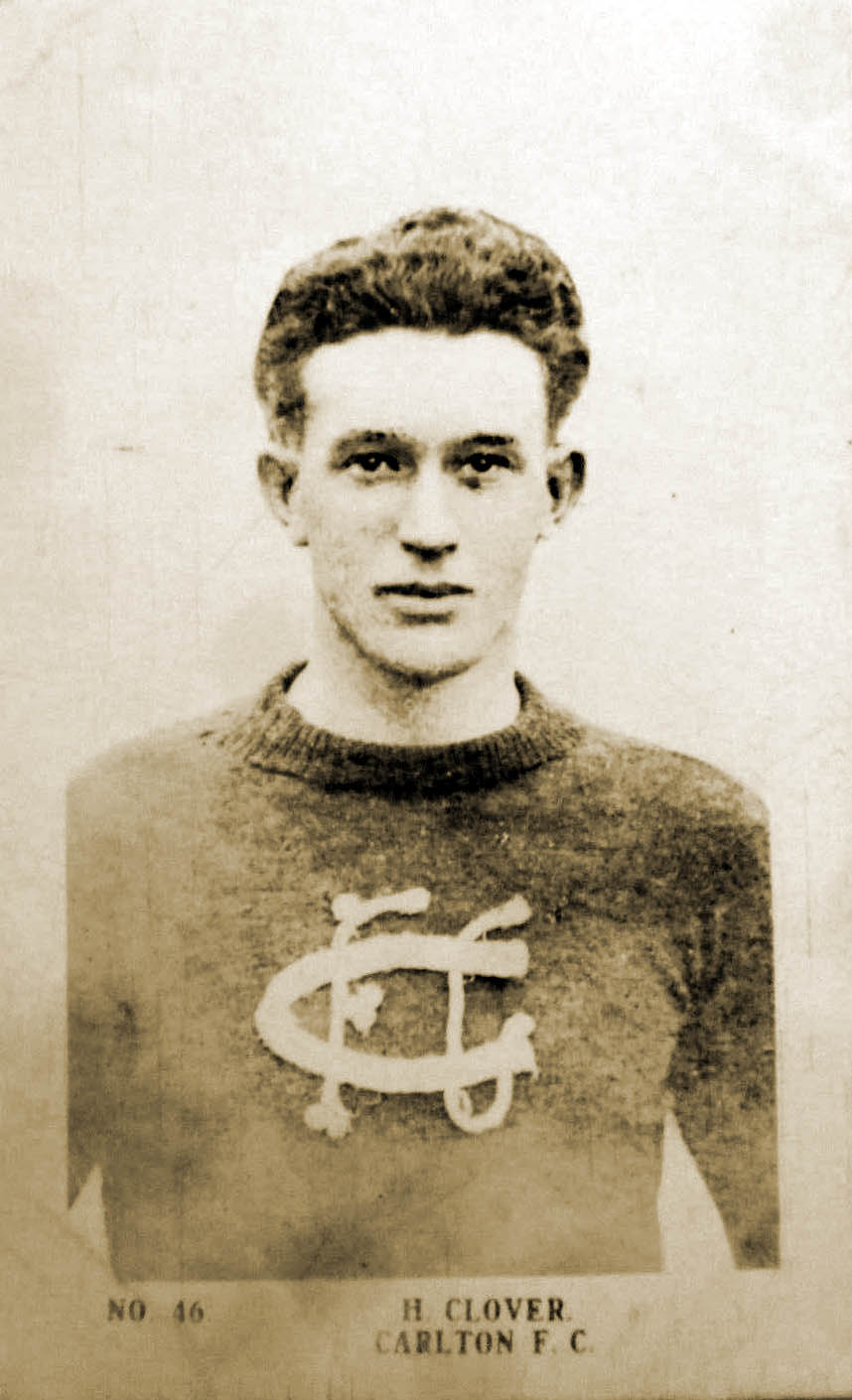
Clover

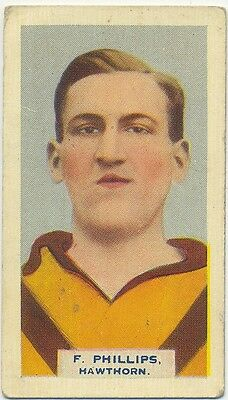
Fred Phillips

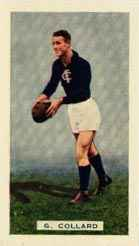
George Collard

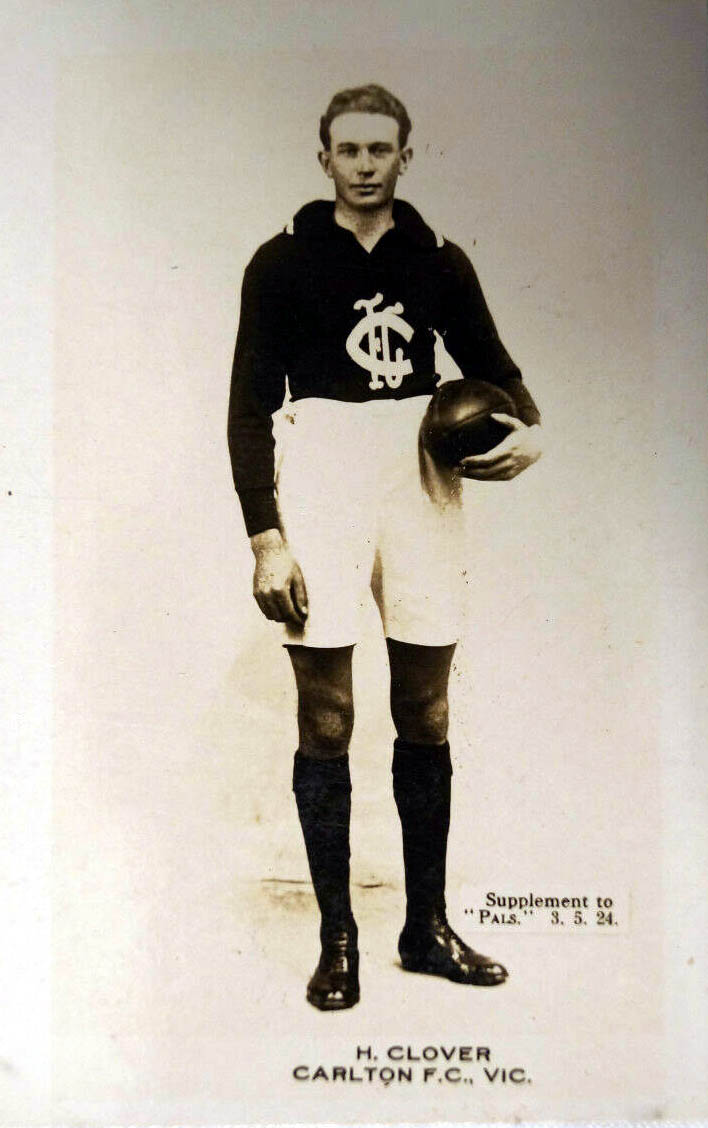
Horrie Clover

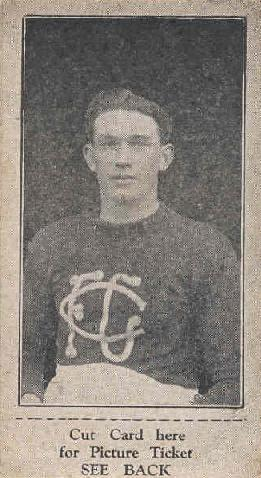
Horrie Clover

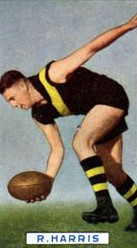
R. Harris

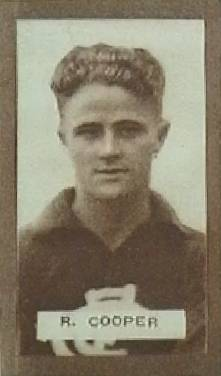
Ron Cooper

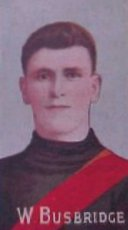
Bill Busbridge

== Sets ==
=== Select Cards (Note: (formerly, "Select Australia")) ===
- 1997 AFL Ultimate
- 1998 AFL Signature
- 1999 AFL Premiere
- 2000 AFL Millennium
- 2001 AFL Authentic
- 2002 AFL Exclusive
- 2003 AFL XL
- 2004 AFL Conquest
- 2005 AFL Tradition
- 2006 AFL Champions
- 2007 AFL Champions
- 2008 AFL Champions
- 2009 AFL Champions
- 2010 AFL Champions
- 2011 AFL Champions
- 2012 AFL Champions
- 2013 AFL Champions
- 2014 AFL Champions
- 2015 AFL Champions
- 2016 AFL Footy Stars
- 2017 AFL Footy Stars
- 2018 AFL Footy Stars
- 2019 AFL Footy Stars
- 2020 AFL Footy Stars
- 2021 AFL Footy Stars
- 2022 AFL Footy Stars
- 2023 AFL Footy Stars
- 2024 AFL Footy Stars
- 2024 AFL Supremacy
- 2025 AFL Footy Stars
- 2025 AFL Footy Stars Hobby
- 2025 AFL Brilliance Signatures
- 2025 AFL Supremacy Rookies
- 2025 AFL Eminence
- 2025 AFL Seamless
- 2026 AFL Footy Stars
- 2026 AFL Footy Stars Hobby
- 2026 AFL Supremacy Rookies
- 2026 AFL Eminence
