= W. A. Gape =

English writer on poverty (1900–1966)

- Born: 1900; Ipswich, Suffolk, England
- Died: 1966 (aged 65–66)
- Other names: "The Tramps K.C.," Bill Gape, and W. A. Gape
- Known for: Advocacy for the homeless
- Notable work: Half a Million Tramps

W. A. Gape (1900 – 1966) was an English writer, advocate for the poor, and self-identified tramp. He was known for his memoir Half a Million Tramps, which chronicles his approximately 22 years on the road, and for his advocacy in organizations such as the Hoboes Union and the second Anarchist Federation. His political work involved advocating for improved living conditions for the homeless and protecting their legal rights. He was also known as Bill Gape and "The Tramps K.C."

== Early life and family ==
Born as William Arthur Gape in the year 1900, he grew up in Ipswich, Suffolk, England with his mother and father, Florence L. Gape and Herbert Gape, as well as with his siblings, Florence E. Gape, Elizabeth A. Gape, Herbert H. Gape, Grace E. Gape, Frederick Gape, and John Gape. The 1911 United Kingdom census recorded Gape as the third youngest of eight siblings.

In 1914, at the age of 14, Gape ran away from his home after a violent interaction with his father. This marked the start of his life as a tramp.

== Work and travel ==
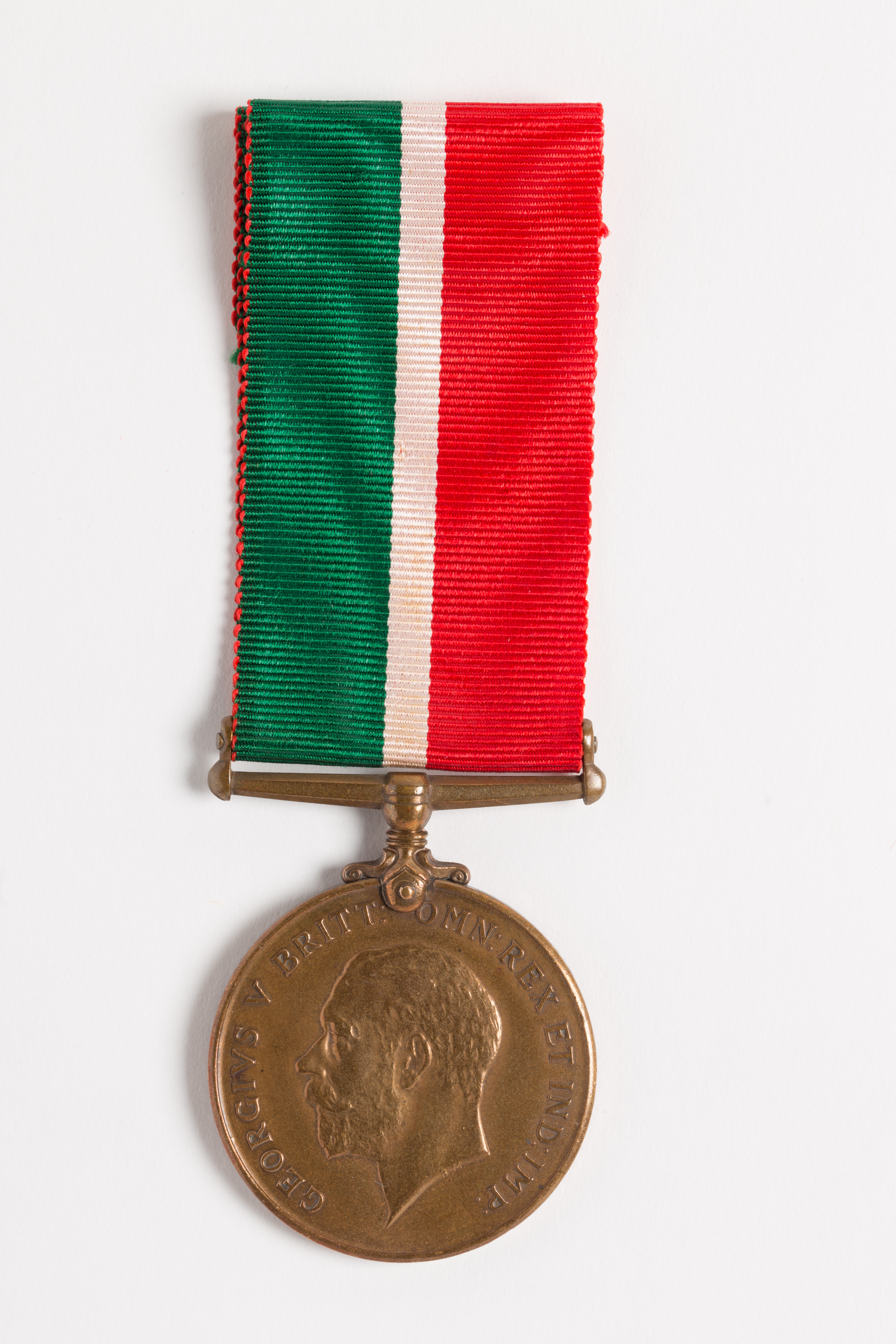
Mercantile Marine War Medal

After leaving home in 1914, Gape enlisted in the British Army. The exact years Gape served are unknown, but they were likely between 1914 and 1921, including during World War I. He was awarded a British War Medal and a Mercantile Marine Medal in 1920 while working as a merchant seaman.

On 21 June 1922, the City of London issued an order of removal for Gape as part of the Poplar Poor Law Union. This court order fell under the English Poor Laws and likely meant Gape was considered fiscally dependent on public relief in an area where he had no legal right to remain.

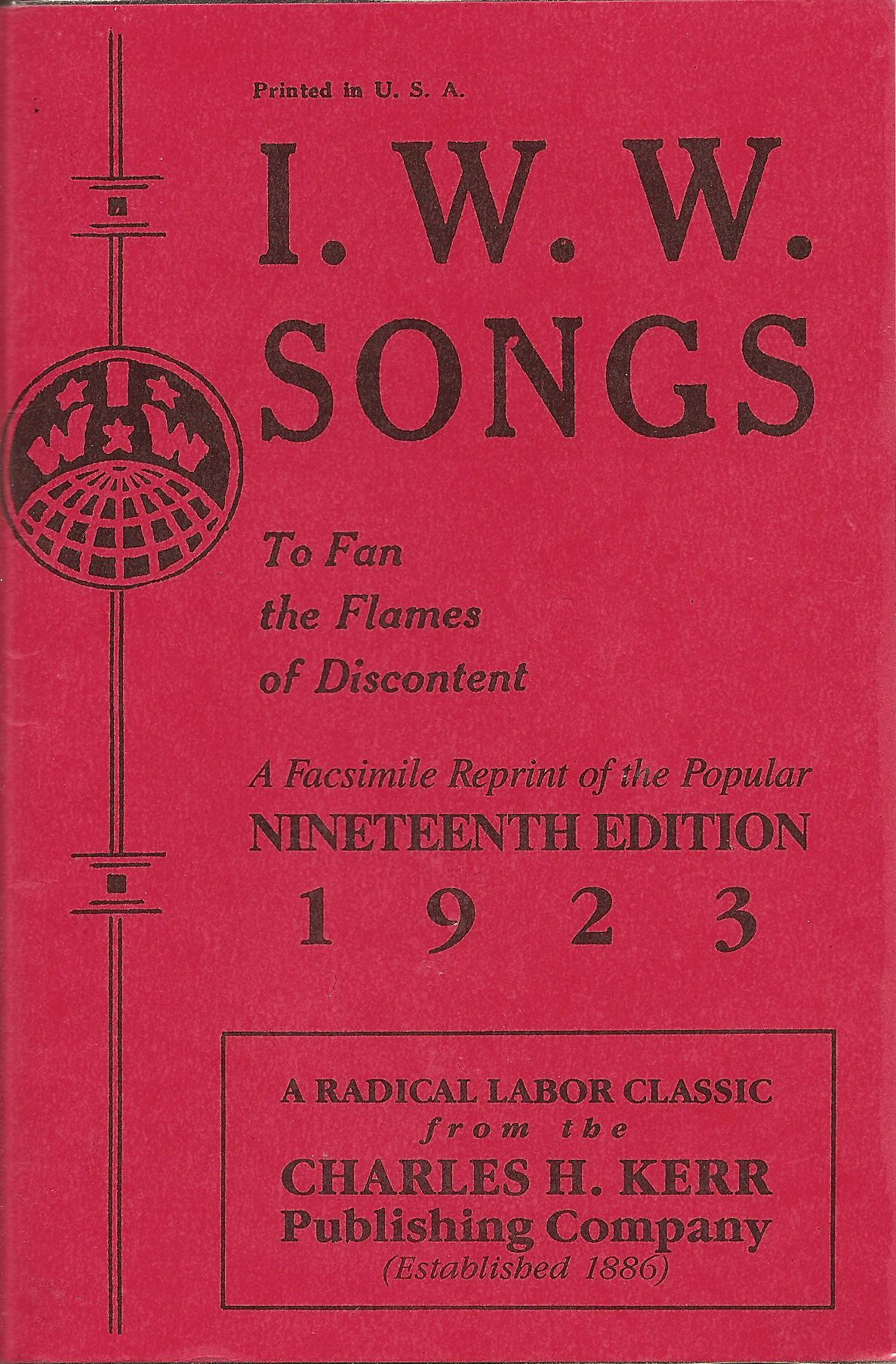
Little Red Songbook

Later, on 2 April 1927, Gape boarded a ship, The Arabic, in an English port and sailed to Halifax, Canada. It is likely that Gape's political career began with his work there when he first read the Industrial Workers of the World’s 1909 Little Red Songbook. His involvement with the IWW inspired him to form the Hoboes Union and embrace a life of advocacy. After his work in Canada, he traveled through the United States and South America before returning back home. Travel documents show he returned to Southampton, England on 23 May 1930 after about three years abroad.

On 2 August 1930, Gape was mentioned in an article titled "Conviction Of Poor Law Officials Quashed," which outlined a violent interaction between Gape and officials at the Edgware Redhill Institution (later Edgware General Hospital). The article reported that Gape arrived at the institution seeking readmission, but when he was turned away, the situation escalated. Two years later, in November 1932, an article highlighting a protest of about 600 workers at the Fulham Institution mentioned Gape as their leader in advocating for better conditions for workers.

Alongside the publication of his autobiography in 1936, Gape founded the Hoboes Union, which later became the National League for the Abolition of Vagrancy. He served as the organizer, secretary, treasurer, and speaker and later took on other various responsibilities within the organization such as the head cook. Through the union, Gape advocated for improved treatment of tramps, particularly in London, and argued that homeless individuals should be treated fairly regardless of their perceived productivity in society. In his memoir, Gape details the union's activities, writing: "The work of the League had to be divided into two sections. One dealt with the development of the idea of “Fellowship on the road”; and the other dealt with appeals to the public to take notice of the frauds and exploitation going on around them."

Continuing his advocacy in England, in 1942 Gape was a featured speaker at a protest in Hyde Park. A newspaper article advertising the rally stated "MAY DAY, 1942. For Workers’ International Solidarity! For the Social Revolution! For Anarchism!"

== Notable writings ==
=== Half a Million Tramps ===
Published in 1936, Gape's autobiography offers a detailed account of his life on the road, tracing its beginnings to 1914 when a violent dispute with his father compelled him to leave home. He chronicles his first few months in London, where he befriends a street singer named Kate, slept on the street, and at times lived in homeless shelters. The narrative then shifts forward to his relationship with a woman named Alice, which, after their separation, gives way to an exploration of his years tramping. The remainder of the memoir outlines specific episodes of his travels, including two years spent in Canada and his journeys across the United States and South America. In addition to his tramping, Gape recorded his extensive political activism in the book, offering a critique of Britain's approach to homelessness and in-depth accounts of his leadership in vagabond advocacy organizations.

Half a Million Tramps was featured and reviewed in multiple newspaper book reviews, such as The Tribune, The Irish Times, and The New Statesman and Nation. A reviewer applauded Gape's ability to capture both the humanity of those with 'uncivilized' life paths, his talent for storytelling, and his realistic yet impassioned effort to shift public perception of tramps. Other reviewers echoed Gape’s comprehensive depictions of poor law, the ward system, and travel encounters but noted that it is too easy to judge tramps' hardships when they show little motivation to work.

In addition to his autobiography, Gape contributed to the Western Daily Press where in 1937 he wrote "To abolish begging and tramping it is first necessary to realise that both are but expressions of the larger problem of unemployment." He similarly contributed to War Commentary, a British newspaper published by Freedom Press, in its March 1942 with an article titled "Is a Master Class Necessary?" His piece argued in support of syndicalism to eradicate capitalism that was causing war and poverty. Gape wrote for them once again in the mid-June 1942 issue. His article, "The Charity Racket," raised concerns about corruption in charitable organizations. He specifically critiqued political parties such as the London Labour Party and the Communist and Labour Alliance as well as local government's involvement in disingenuous charity. He concluded his article by stating, "Anarchism is the only method by which charity and poverty can be abolished." In a later issue of the paper, Gape was mentioned as part of a "New Series of Lectures," where he was scheduled to deliver a talk titled The Strike Weapon.

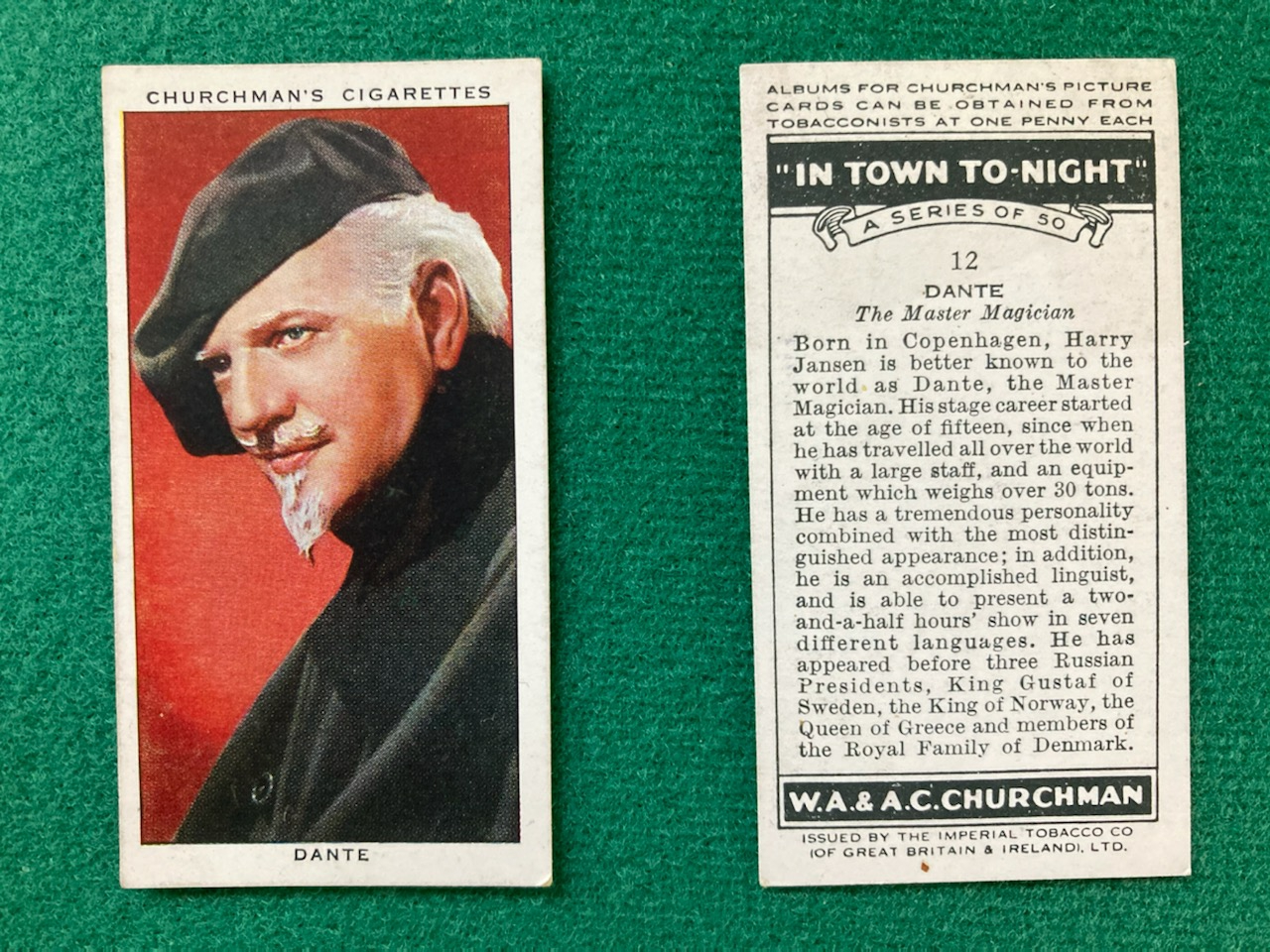
One of a 50-card series from Churchman's “In Town Tonight” cigarette cards.

== Later life and death ==
In 1938, Gape appeared on his own cigarette card in the Churchman's “In Town Tonight” cigarette card series. The card applauded Gape for his knowledge of "the Law" and his advocacy for tramps, indicating that he was a recognized and notable figure of the time.

In June 1966, Gape died in his sleep at the age of 66. In July 1966, Gape's obituary commended his ability to be "his own man." The obituary underscored his reputation as an "anarcho - syndicalist and freethought speaker" and remembered his efforts to advocate for the rights of tramps.

Many years later, in 2021, a contemporary scholar referenced Gape in a book examining the role of tramps in British literature, reflecting continued academic relevance years after his death.
