= Cigarette card =

Trading cards included in cigarette packaging

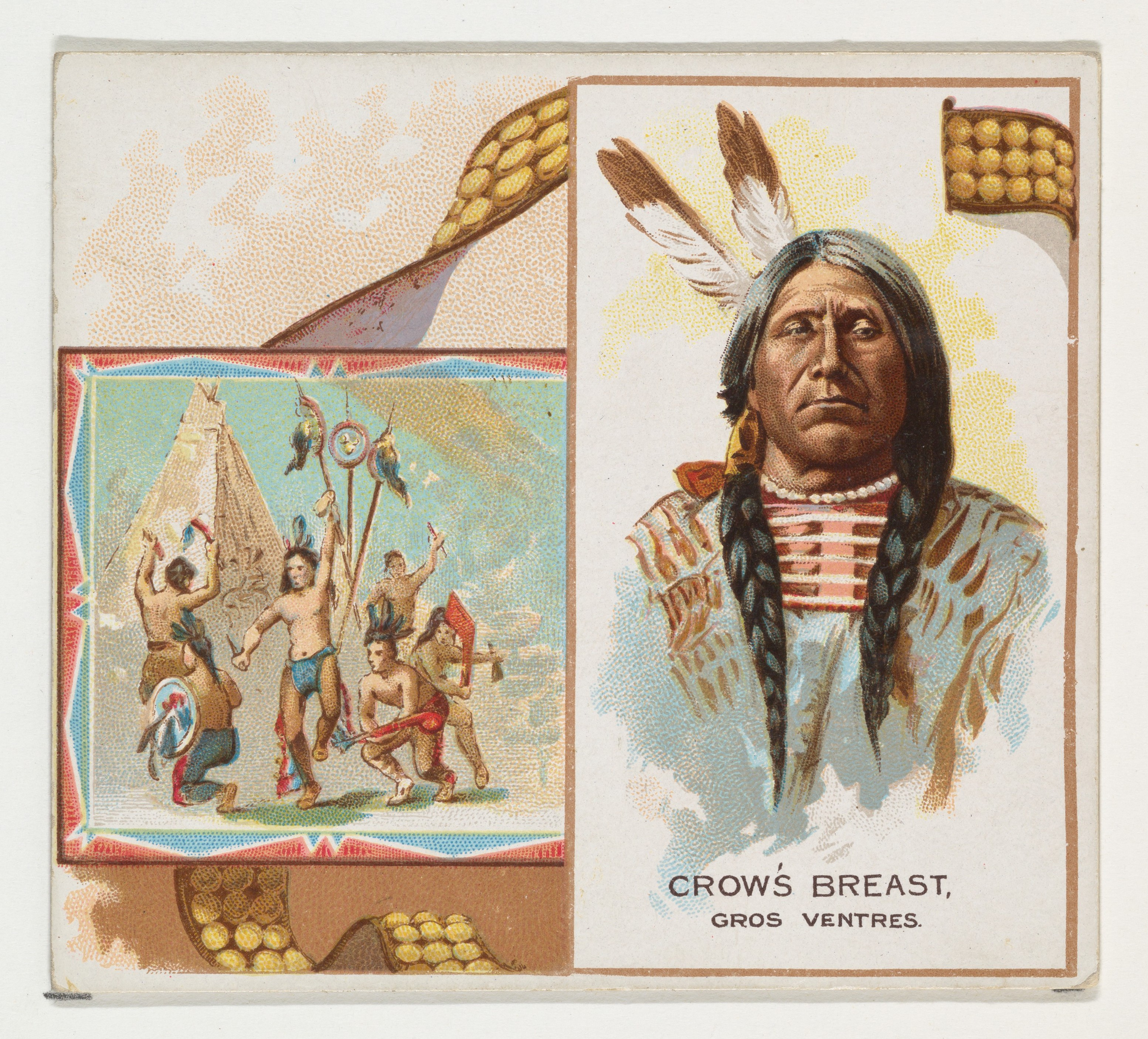
- A Gros Ventre Chief featured on an Allen & Ginter card, 1888
- Type: Collectible card Cigarette advertising
- Invented by: Tobacco manufacturers
- Availability: 1875–1940s
- Materials: Cardboard
- Features: Various topics (including sports, art, vehicles, geography, dressing, history, among others)

Cigarette cards are trading cards issued by tobacco manufacturers to stiffen cigarette packaging and advertise cigarette brands.

Between 1875 and the 1940s, cigarette companies often included collectible cards with their packages of cigarettes. Cigarette card sets document popular culture from the era, often depicting the period's actresses, costumes, and sports, and offering insights into mainstream humour and cultural norms.

== History ==
Beginning in 1879, cards depicting actresses, baseball players, Native American chiefs, boxers, national flags, or wild animals were issued by the U.S.-based Allen & Ginter tobacco company. These are considered to be some of the first cigarette cards. Other tobacco companies such as Goodwin & Co. soon followed suit. They first emerged in the U.S., then the UK, then, eventually, in many other countries.

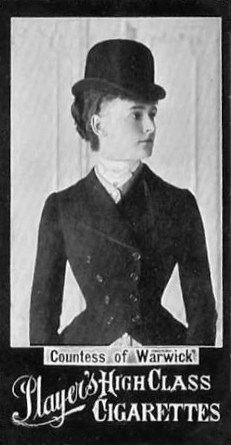
Daisy Greville featured on a Player's card, c. 1890

In the UK, W.D. & H.O. Wills in 1887 were one of the first companies to include advertising cards with their cigarettes. John Player & Sons produced one of the first general interest sets, "Castles and Abbeys" in 1893.

Thomas Ogden of Liverpool soon followed in 1894 and in 1895, Wills produced their first set, "Ships and Sailors". In 1896 Wills produced the first set in the United Kingdom with a sporting theme called "Cricketers". In 1906, Ogden's produced a set of association football cards depicting footballers in their club colours, in one of the first full-colour sets.

Each set of cards typically consisted of 25 or 50 related subjects, but series of over 100 cards per issue are known. Popular themes were "beauties" (famous actresses, film stars, and models), sporters (in the U.S. mainly baseball; in the rest of the world mainly football and cricket), nature, military heroes and uniforms, heraldry, locomotives, and city views.

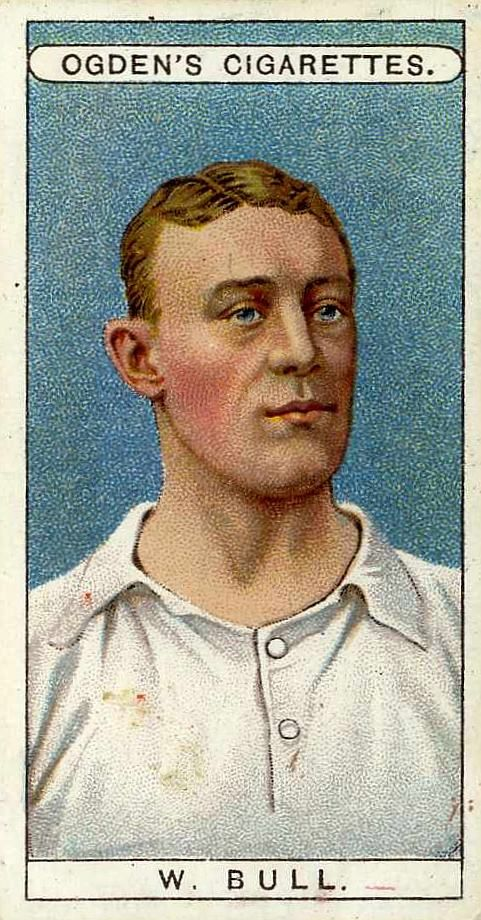
English footballer Walter Bull depicted on an Ogden's card, c. 1906

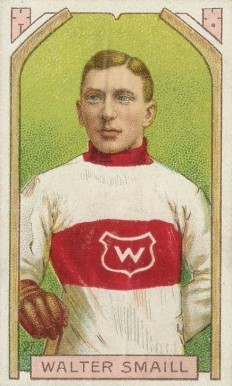
Walter Smaill illustration on an Imperial Tobacco Canada

Imperial Tobacco Canada manufactured the first ice hockey cards ever for the inaugural NHL season. There were a total of 36 cards in the set, each one featured an illustration of a player. After World War I, only one more cigarette set was issued, during 1924–25.

Today, for example, sports and military historians study these cards for details on uniform design.

Some very early cigarette cards were printed on silk which was then attached to a paper backing. They were discontinued in order to save paper during World War II, and never fully reintroduced thereafter.

Doral, an R. J. Reynolds Tobacco Company brand, started printing cigarette cards in the year 2000. These were the first cigarette cards from a major manufacturer since the 1940s, although the small company Carreras in the UK issued cigarette cards with Turf brand cigarettes for a short period in the 1950s and 1960s, Black Cat brand in 1976. Furthermore, card-like coupons with special offers have often been included in cigarette packets over the years.

The first set of "Doral Celebrate America" cards featured the 50 states in two releases, 2000 and 2001. Later themes include American festivals, cars, national parks, and 20th century events.

Natural American Spirit, another R.J. Reynolds Tobacco Company brand, also includes cigarette cards on their packs, with information on such things as windpower, diversity, and their farmers.

Philip Morris USA started including "Information For Smokers" cigarette cards in certain packs. One provides information on quitting smoking and the other states that "Light, "Ultra Light", "Mild", "Medium", and "Low Tar" cigarettes are just as harmful as "Full Flavor" ones.

== Classification and cataloguing ==
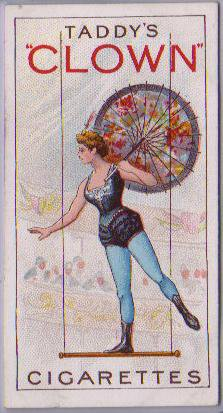
An original Taddy's Clowns and Circus Artistes card

The system devised to codify 19th Century American tobacco issues has its origin in the "American Card Catalog" (ACC), written by Jefferson Burdick. Burdick listed the American Tobacco cards in one section, broken down by companies that issued the card series and by the types of cards. The 19th Century issues were prefixed with "N" (N1-N694) and the 20th with "T". (T1-T235).

=== The World Tobacco Index (WTI) ===
The World Tobacco Index (WTI), published by the Cartophilic Society of Great Britain (CSGB), lists all known tobacco issues from around the world and is still being updated on reports of new finds. Using a similar alphanumeric system, it assigns a code based on the name of manufacturer, rather than the century in which the cards were issued. For example, Burdick's N2 "Celebrated American Indian Chiefs" by Allen & Ginter is listed as A400-030 (a), with the larger N42 series listed as A400-030 (b).

== Sports cigarette cards ==
The following list focuses on the sports-only cards manufactured by tobacco companies:

(Sports only) cigarette cards
Manufacturer (Note: The list include only manufacturing companies and not their individual brands.)	Assoc. foot.	Aus foot.	Baseb.	Boxing	Cricket	Golf	Horse rac.	Hockey and/ Lacrosse	Rugby	Tennis
(United States) Allen & Ginter (Note: Merged to form American Tobacco in 1890. The "W. Duke & Sons" company was part of the group but did not include sports figures into their card sets.)	No	No	Yes (Note: As part of various sports sets, not as individual collections.)	Yes	No	No	No	No	No	Yes
(United States) American Tobacco (Note: American Tobacco was formed by 5 companies: W. Duke & Sons, Allen & Ginter, W.S. Kimball & Company, Kinney Tobacco, and Goodwin & Company. It commercialised cards through its brands Fatima, Hassan, Meca, Obak, and others.)	No	No	Yes	Yes	No	No	No	No	No	No
(England) British American Tobacco (Note: Formed in 1902, when the UK Imperial Tobacco and the US' American Tobacco agreed to form a joint venture.)	Yes	No	No	Yes	Yes	No	No	No	No	No
(United States) D. Buchner	No	No	Yes	No	No	No	No	No	No	No
(England) Churchman	Yes	No	No	Yes	Yes	Yes	No	No	No	Yes
(England) Cohen Weenen	Yes	No	No	Yes	Yes	No	Yes	No	Yes	No
(England) Gallaher (Note: Founded by Thomas Gallaher in Belfast, the company became the largest independent buyer of tobacco in the world. It owned the Benson & Hedges brand. Gallaher was acquired by American Tobacco in 1974, and the factory closed in 1988. Japan Tobacco acquired Gallaher in 2007.)	Yes	No	No	No	Yes	No	Yes	No	Yes	No
(England) Godfrey Phillips	Yes	Yes (Note: Only traded in Australia.)	No	Yes	No	No	No	No	No	No
(United States) Goodwin & Co.	No	No	Yes	Yes	No	No	No	No	No	No
Imperial Tobacco Canada (Note: Canadian subsidiary of British Imperial Tobacco.)	No	No	No	No	No	No	No	Yes (Note: Commercialised its ice hockey cards only in Canada.)	No	No
(England) John Player & Sons (Note: Merged to form Imperial Tobacco in 1901.)	Yes	No	No	No	Yes	Yes	No	No	Yes	Yes
(United States) W.S. Kimball & Co.	No	No	Yes	Yes	No	No	Yes	No	No	No
(England) Lambert & Butler	Yes	No	No	No	Yes	No	Yes	No	Yes	Yes
(England) Lorillard	No	No	No	Yes	No	No	No	No	No	No
(England) Ogden's	Yes	No	No	Yes	Yes	Yes	Yes	No	Yes	Yes
(Australia) J J Schuh Tobacco Co	No	Yes	No	No	No	No	Yes	No	No	No
(Australia) Sniders & Abrahams	No	Yes	No	No	Yes	No	No	No	No	No
(England) James Taddy & Co.	Yes	No	No	No	Yes	No	No	No	Yes	No
(England) W.D. & H.O. Wills (Note: Also commercialising through its brand Capstan.)	Yes	Yes	No	No	Yes	No	No	No	Yes	No

=== Association football ===
Ogden's Limited of Liverpool produced cigarette cards featuring football from 1894 which were included with their Guinea Gold brand until 1901. They were later included with their Tabs brand from 1901 to 1903.

In 1896 Marcus & Company of Manchester produced the first football set called Footballers & Club Colours. In 1902 W.D. & H.O. Wills produced a set of football-related cards called the Football Series with 66 cards featuring advertising for their Wild Woodbine and Cinderella brands. William Clarke & Sons of Liverpool later issued the same set but with a short biography for the player on each one.

In 1906, Ogden's produced a set depicting footballers in their club colours, in one of the first full-colour sets.

Wills issued a 50-card set for the Indian market in 1907 with their Scissors brand, called Football Team Colours. Further sets were issued overseas by Wills in 1910 and 1914.

Wills produced further sets in 1935 and 1939.

=== Cricket ===
Wills produced a set called "Cricketers" in 1896 and released others sets in 1901, 1908, 1909, 1910, and 1928.

== Other cigarette cards ==
Another notable and sought-after set of cards is the untitled series issued by Taddy and known by collectors as "Clowns and Circus Artistes". While not the rarest cards in existence (there are a number of series in which only one known example remains), they are still very rare and command high prices whenever they come up for auction. The T206 Ty Cobb is another example of a notably rare cigarette card.

The Mecca cigarette trading card for George Sutton is also notable for it depicts him with hands. Sutton was known as "the handless billiard player" for mastering the game with such a handicap.

Apart from these examples, there are also cigarette cards that do not focus on people, but on cities or flags.

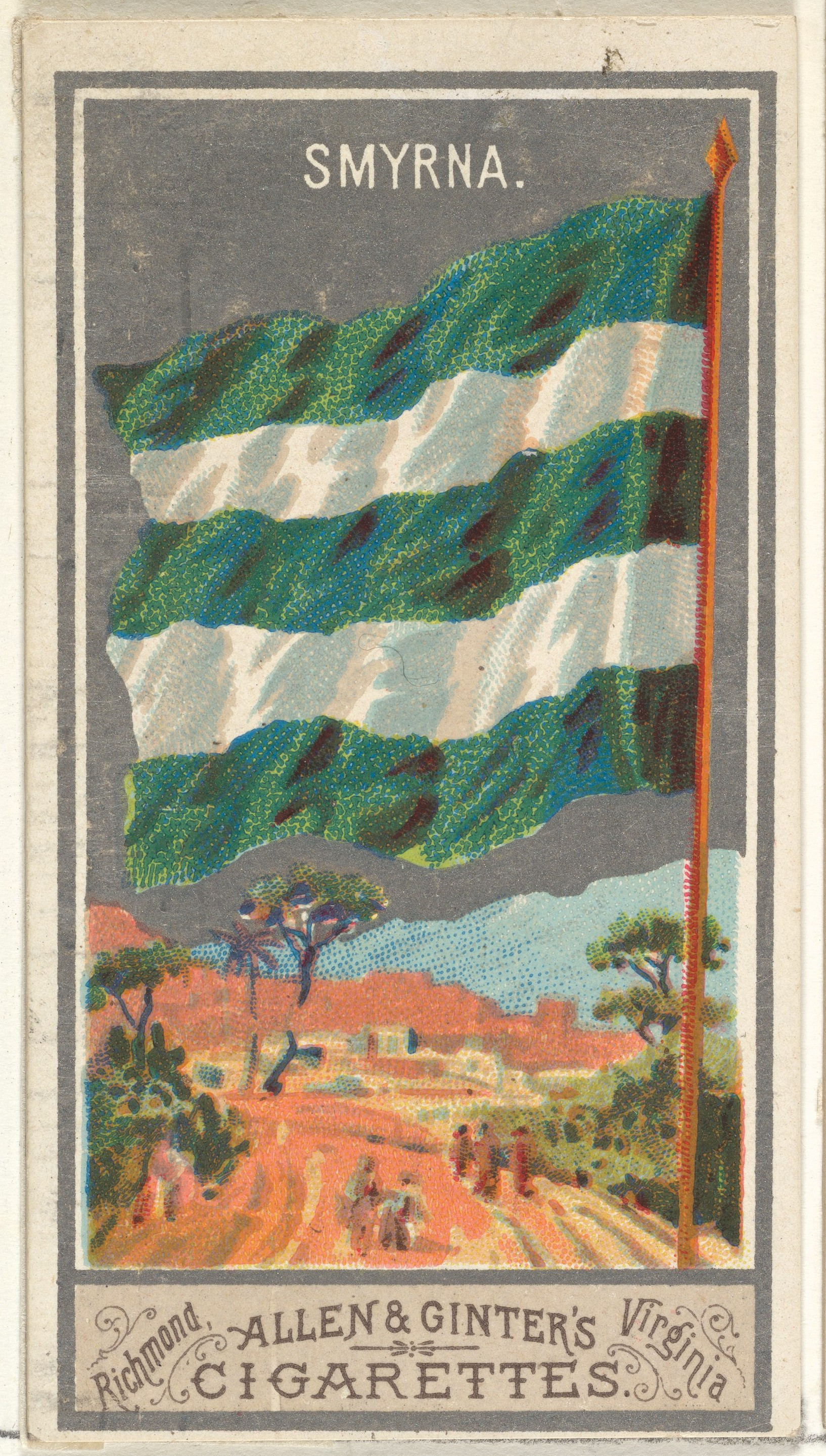
Smyrna, from the City Flags series (N6) for Allen & Ginter Cigarettes Brands (1887)

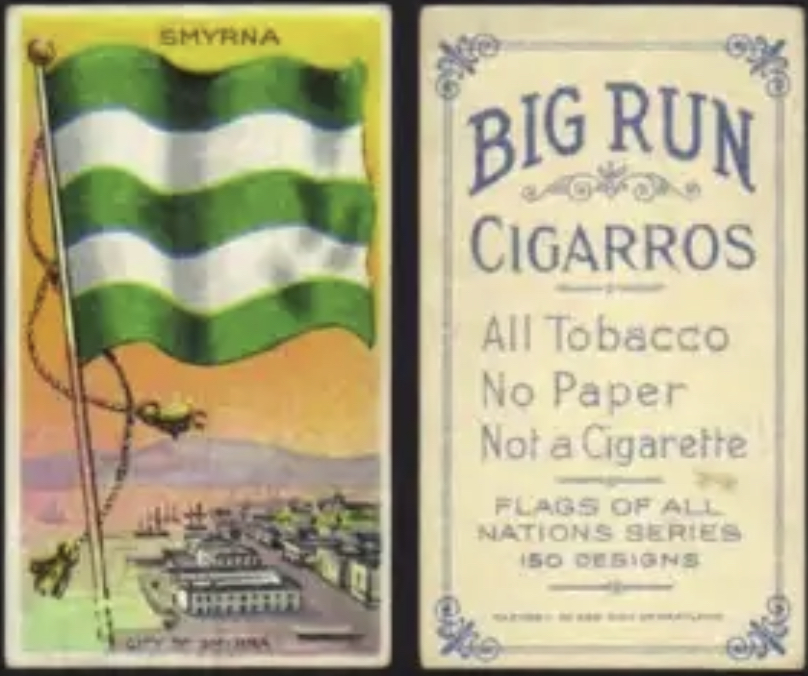
Flag of Smyrna (İzmir) pictured on the „Flags of all nations series 150 designs“

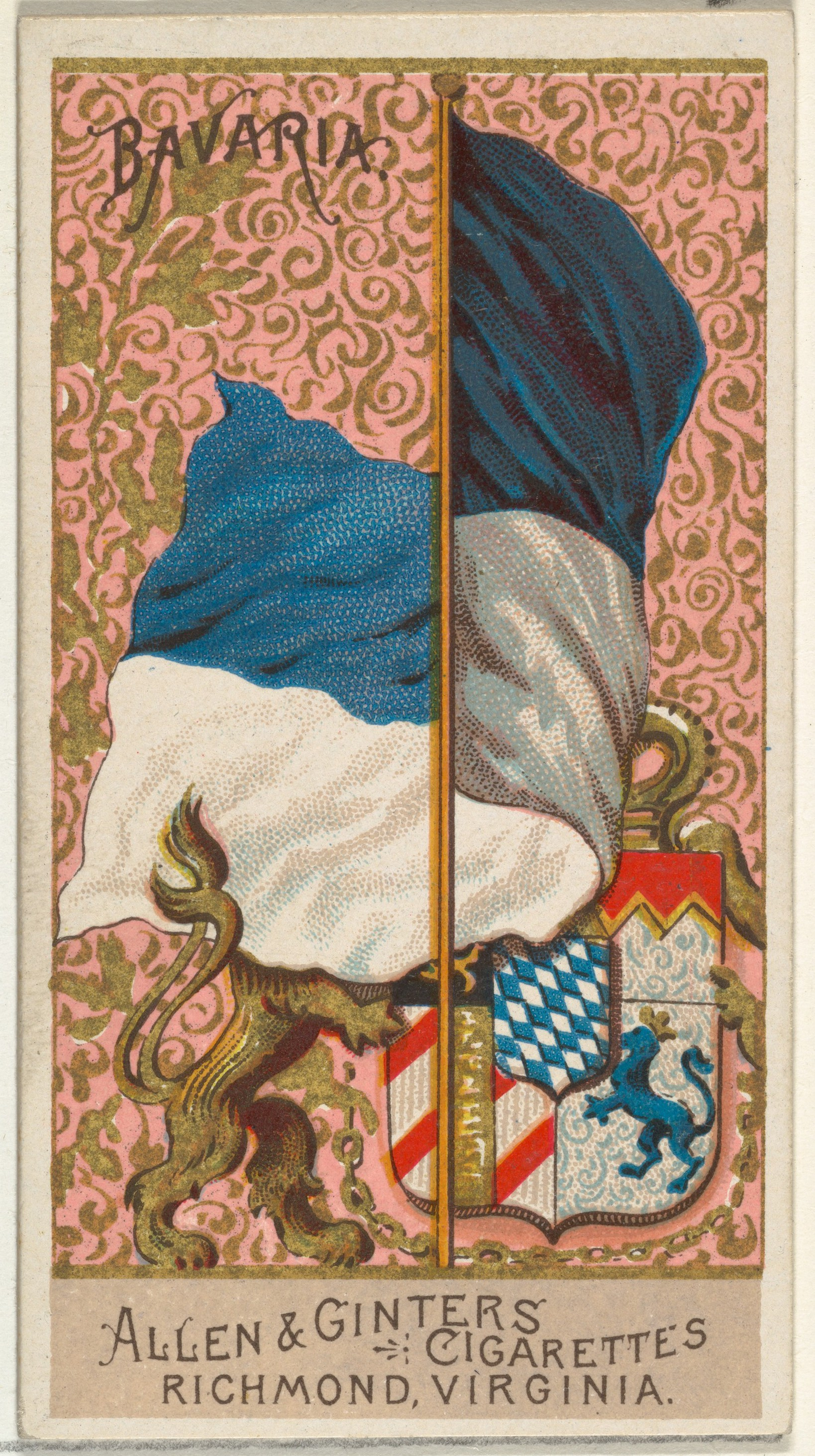
Flag of Bavaria

The standard version of the World War One Princess Mary's Christmas Gift included a cigarette card featuring a photo of Princess Mary placed within the pack of cigarettes. The photo was taken by Ernest Brooks.

== Cigarette card-size booklets ==
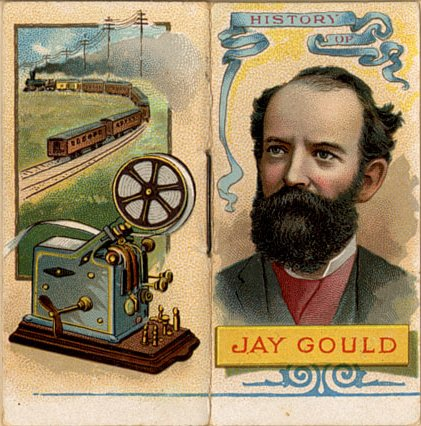
Cover of "History of Jay Gould," part of the set of 50 card-size booklets, Histories of Poor Boys Who Became Rich and Other Famous People, produced by Duke, Sons & Co. in 1888

Shortly before it became part of the American Tobacco Company, Durham-based W. Duke, Sons & Co., a pioneering publisher of cigarette cards, issued several sets of cigarette card-size booklets such as Histories of Poor Boys Who Became Rich and Other Famous People and Histories of Generals (both published in 1888). Each set included 50 miniature biographical booklets, which were included with cigarette packages just as collectible cigarette cards were. Some other companies followed suit, including the UK-based John Player & Sons, which issued a range of cigarette card booklets later in the 20th century, such as those related to Royal Air Force badges and military uniforms.

== Legacy ==
The largest cigarette card collection on record is that of Edward Wharton-Tigar. His collection, bequeathed to the British Museum following his death in 1995, is recognised by the Guinness Book of Records as the largest collection of its kind. His autobiography, Burning Bright, details his obsession with collecting cigarette cards, his business life, which included becoming President of Selection Trust – at the time, one of the largest mining companies in the world – and his lifelong passion for cricket, which culminated in his presidency of Kent Cricket Club. When asked what others thought of his collecting he said: "If to collect cigarette cards is a sign of eccentricity, how then will posterity judge one who amassed the biggest collection in the world? Frankly, I care not."

He was the president of the Cartophilic Society of Great Britain until his death in 1995.

=== World record price ===
The most valuable cigarette card in the world features Honus Wagner, one of the great names in U.S. baseball at the turn of the 20th century. The T206 Honus Wagner has repeatedly set records at auction, most recently in 2016 when it sold for $3,120,000. Wagner was a dedicated non-smoker and objected when America's biggest tobacco corporation planned to picture him on a cigarette card without his permission. Threats of legal action prevented its release, but a few slipped out, and it was one of these that stunned the collecting world when it was auctioned.

== Gallery ==
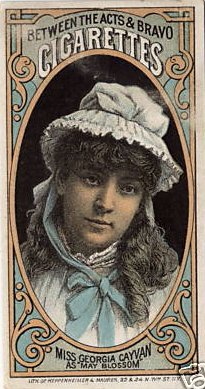
Actress Georgia Cayvan, c. 1882

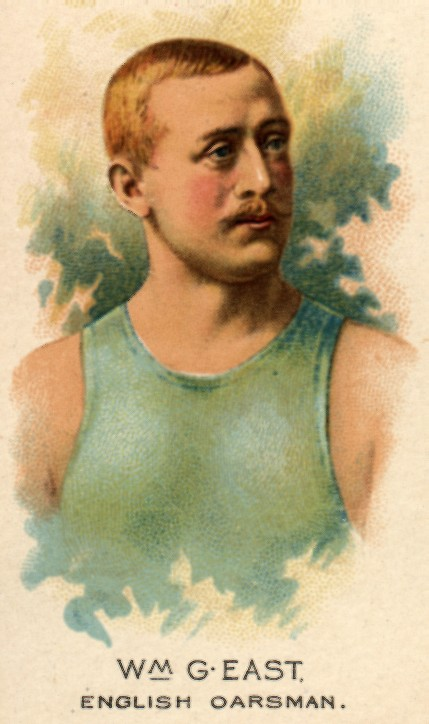
Bill East, English oarsman, c. 1885

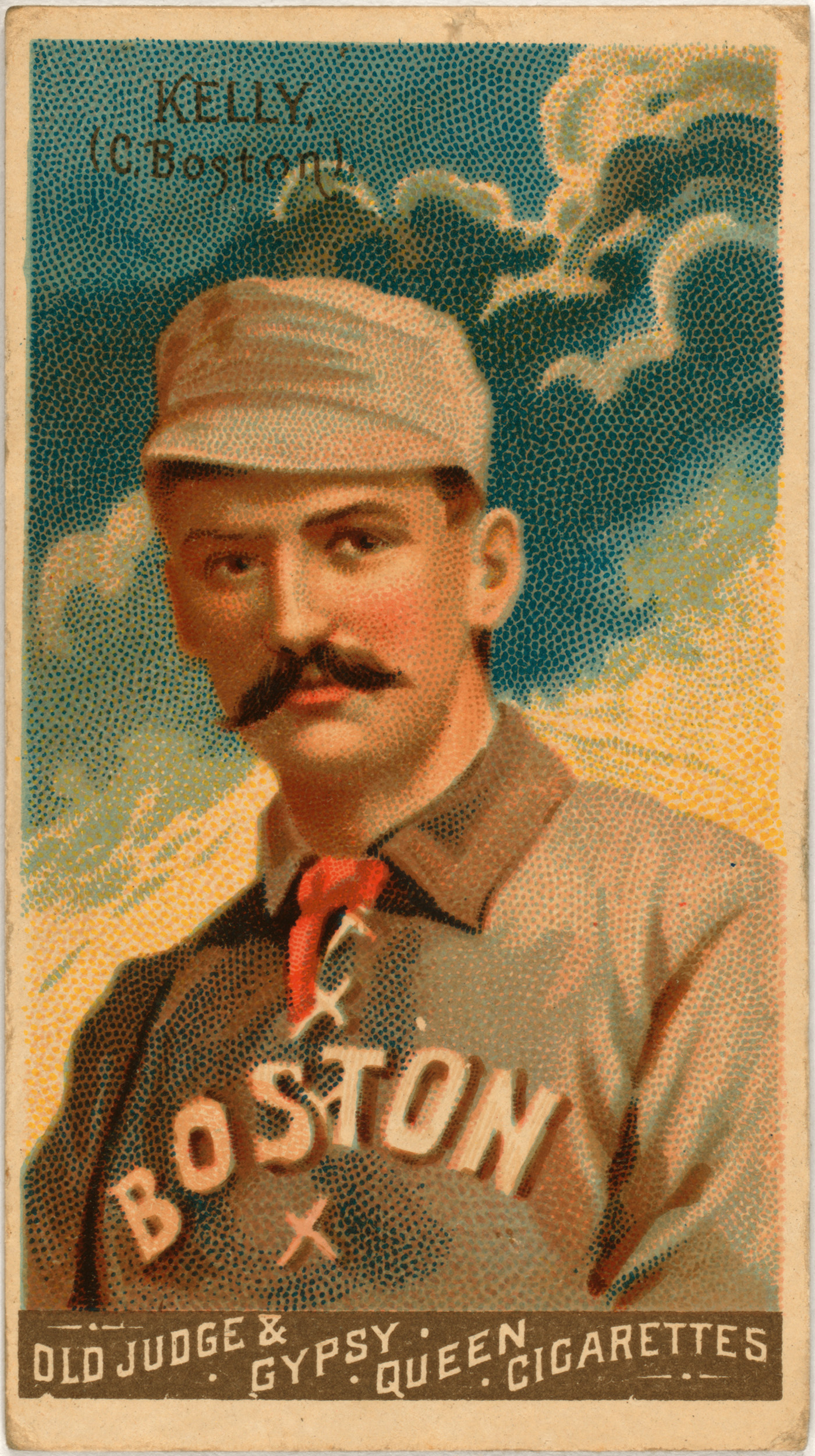
King Kelly (Goodwin & Company Cigarettes 1888)

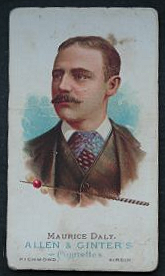
Maurice Daly, US billiards champion, 1888

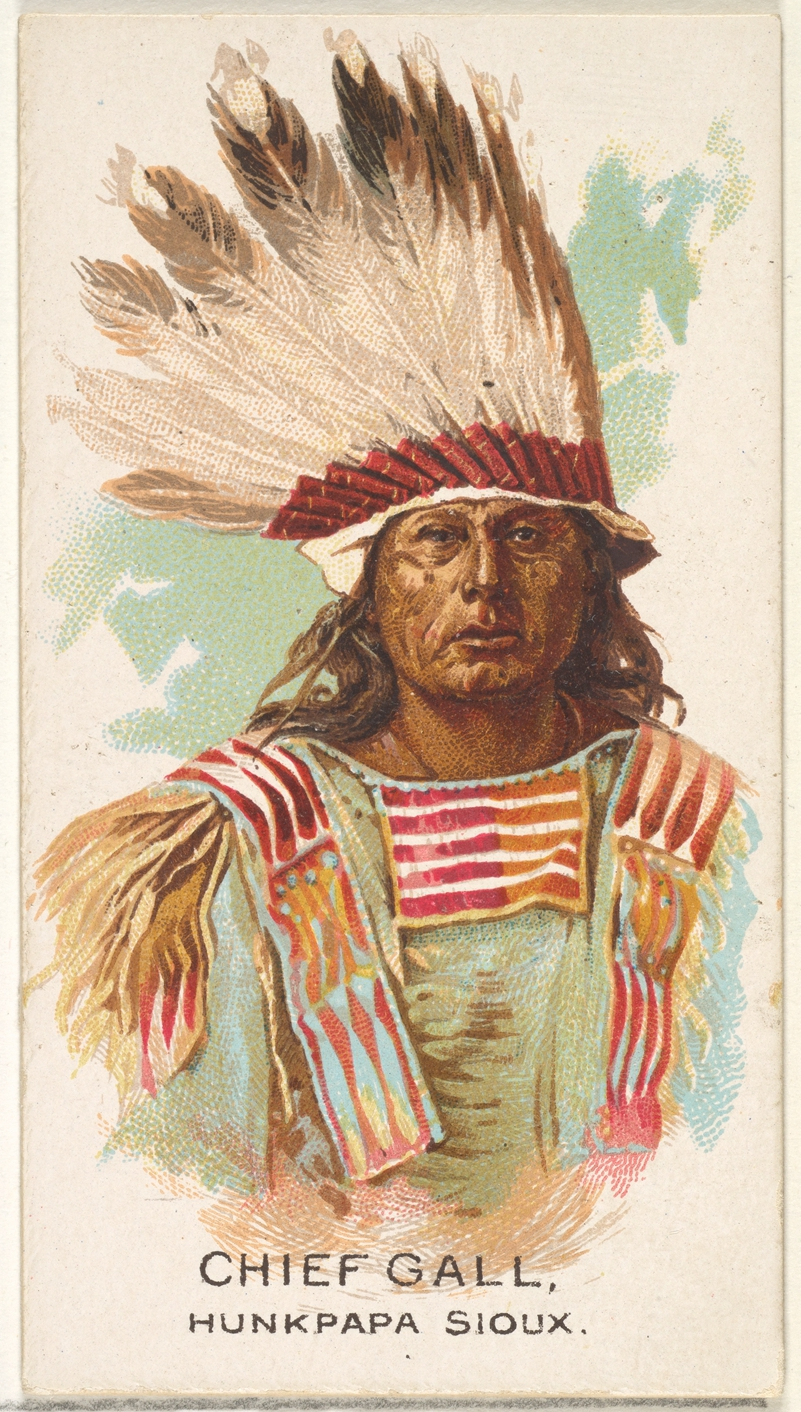
Chief Gall (Allen & Ginter, 1888)

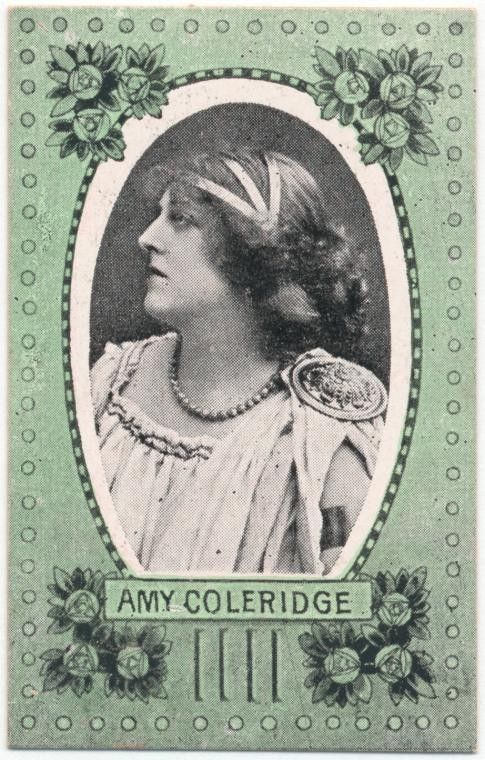
Amy Coleridge, before 1900

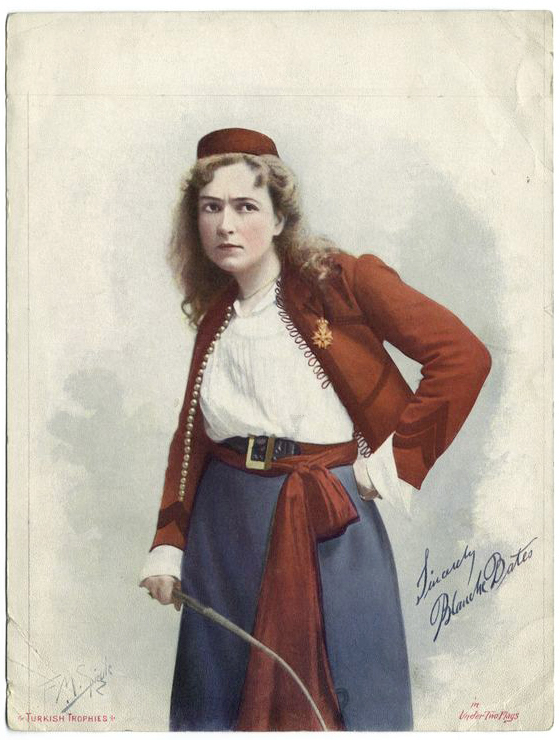
Actress, Blanche Bates, 1901

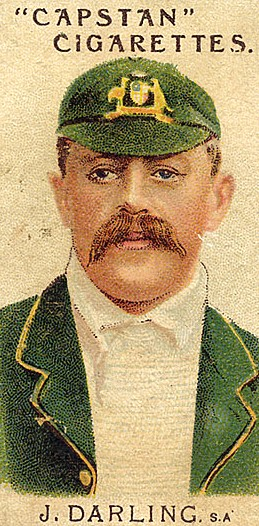
Former Australian cricket captain, Joe Darling, early 1900s

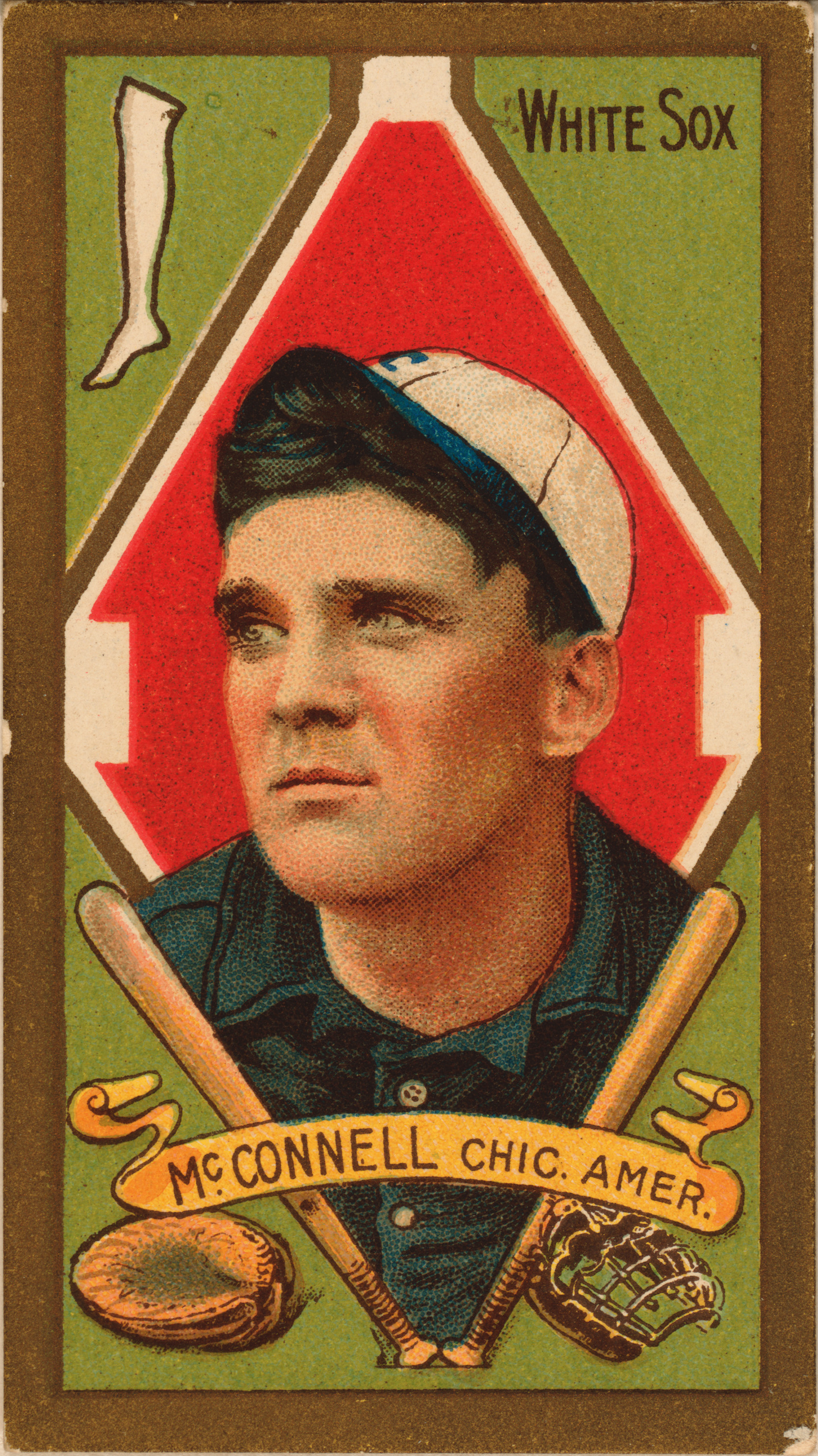
Ambrose McConnell (American Tobacco, 1911)

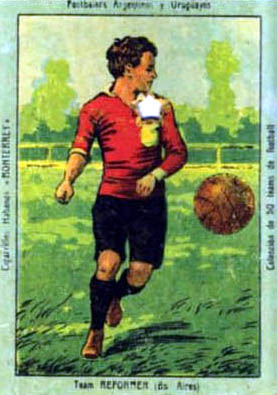
Reformer A.C. of Argentina, Cigarrillos Monterrey, 1911

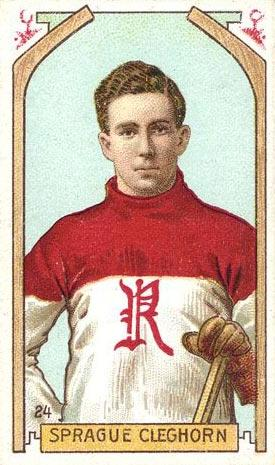
Sprague Cleghorn (Imperial Tobacco, c. 1911–12)

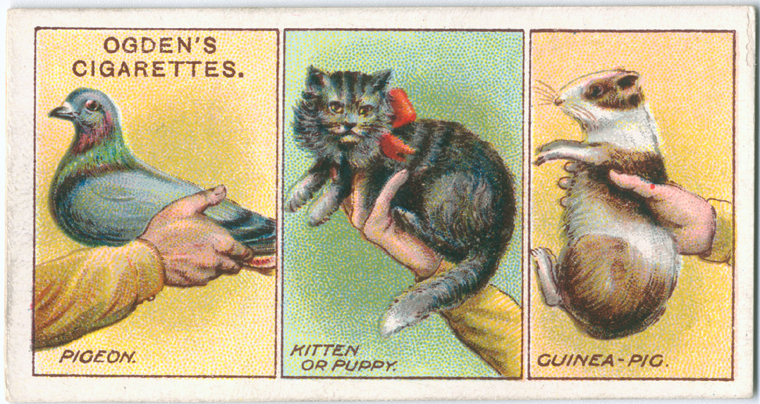
How to Hold Pets (Ogden's Cigarettes 1903–1917)

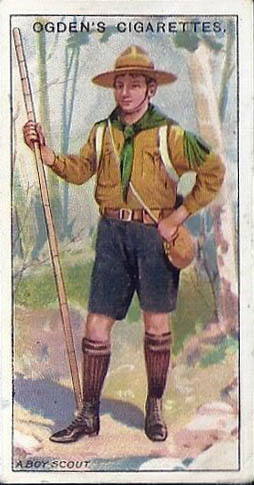
Boy Scout (Ogden's Cigarettes 1903–1917)

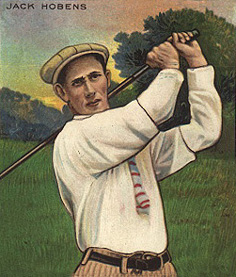
A 1910 artist's rendition of Jack Hobens (Mecca cigarettes)

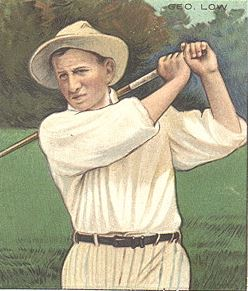
A 1910 card showing pro golfer George Low Sr. (Mecca cigarettes)

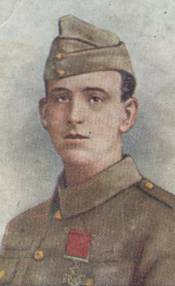
Victoria Cross recipient Alexander Stewart Burton, c. 1915 (Gallaher Cigarettes)

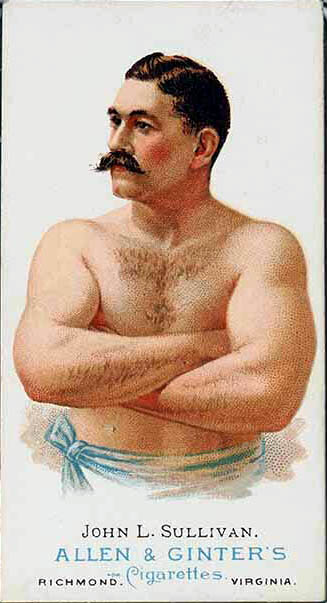
John L. Sullivan (Allen & Ginter's Cigarettes), 1888–1889

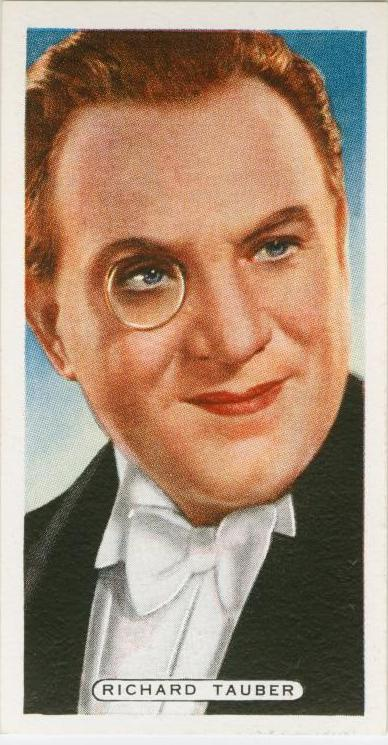
Richard Tauber, Film, stage, and radio stars (1932)

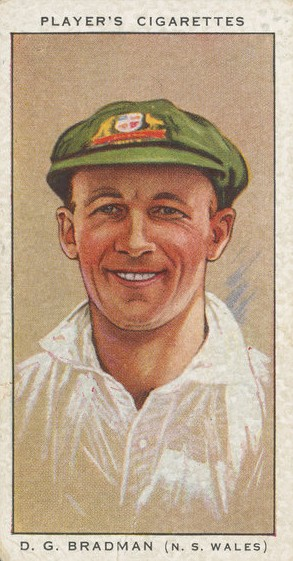
Australian batsman, Donald Bradman, 1934 Ashes series

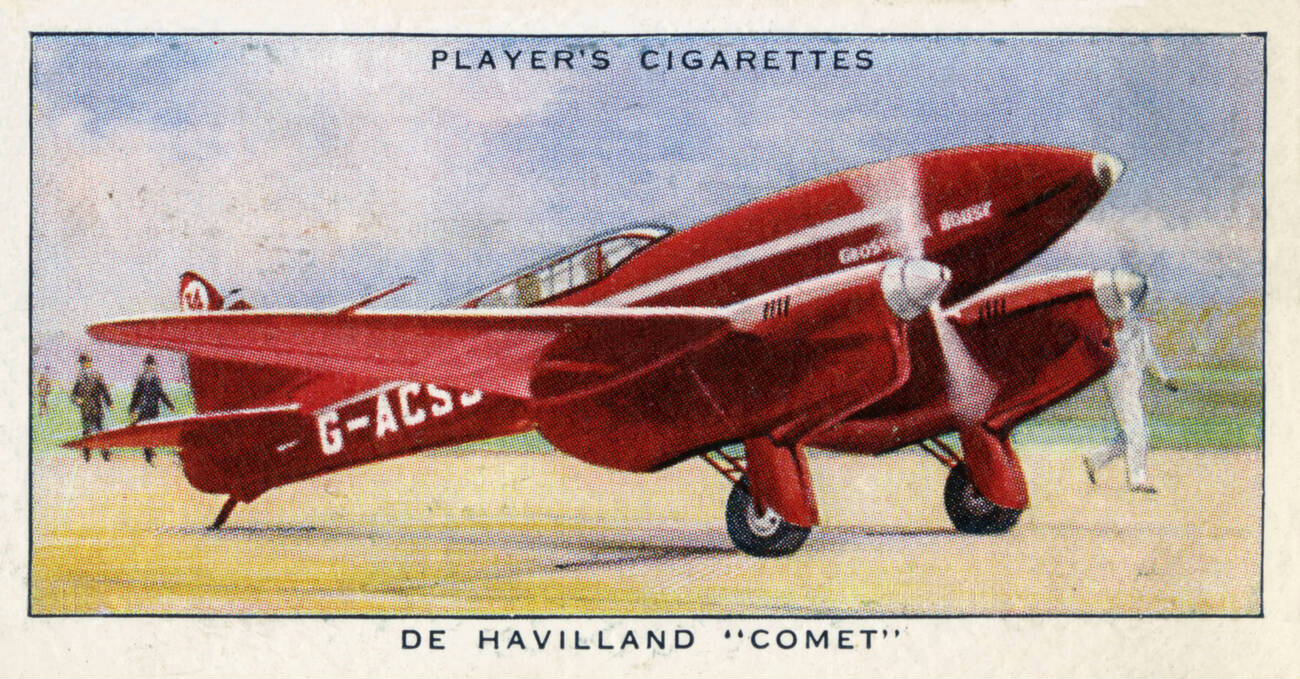
de Havilland Comet (Player's Cigarettes 1935)

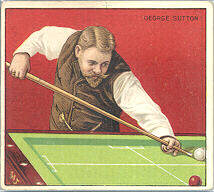
George H. Sutton (Mecca cigarettes)

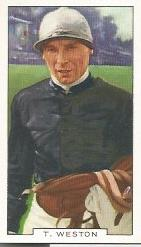
Tommy Weston by Gallaher, 1936

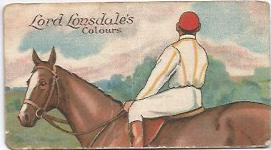
Lord Lonsdale's racing colours by E & W Anstie 1922

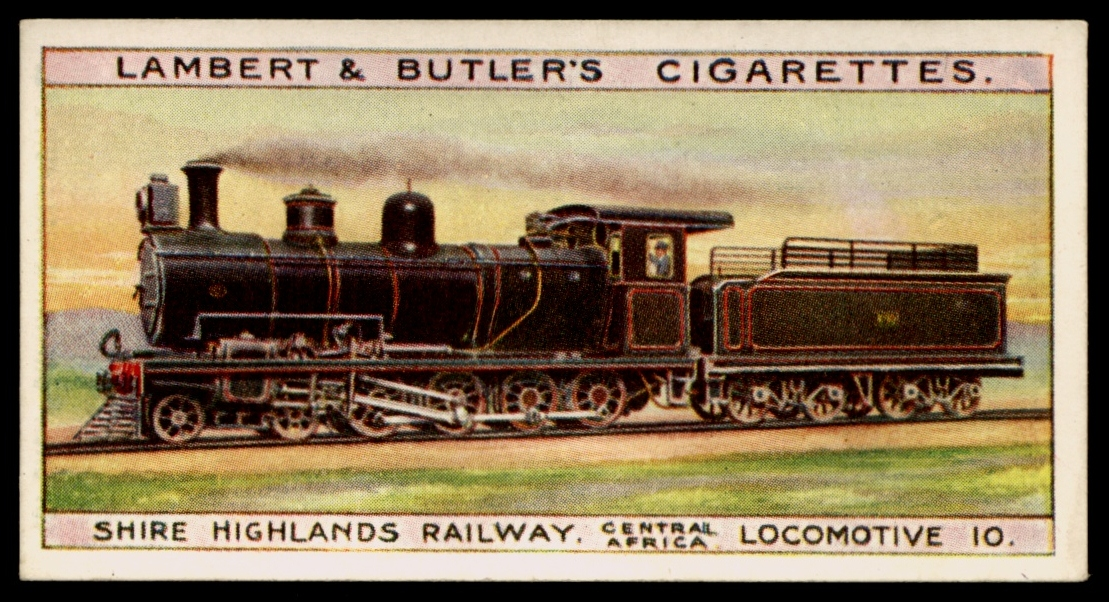
Shire Highlands Railway, Nyasaland Protectorate locomotive by Lambert & Butler's "World's Locomotives"

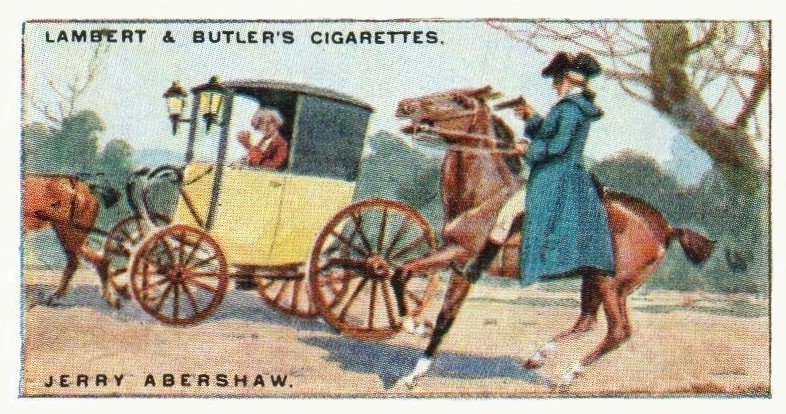
Jerry Abershawe from Pirates and Highwaymen series (Lambert & Butler)

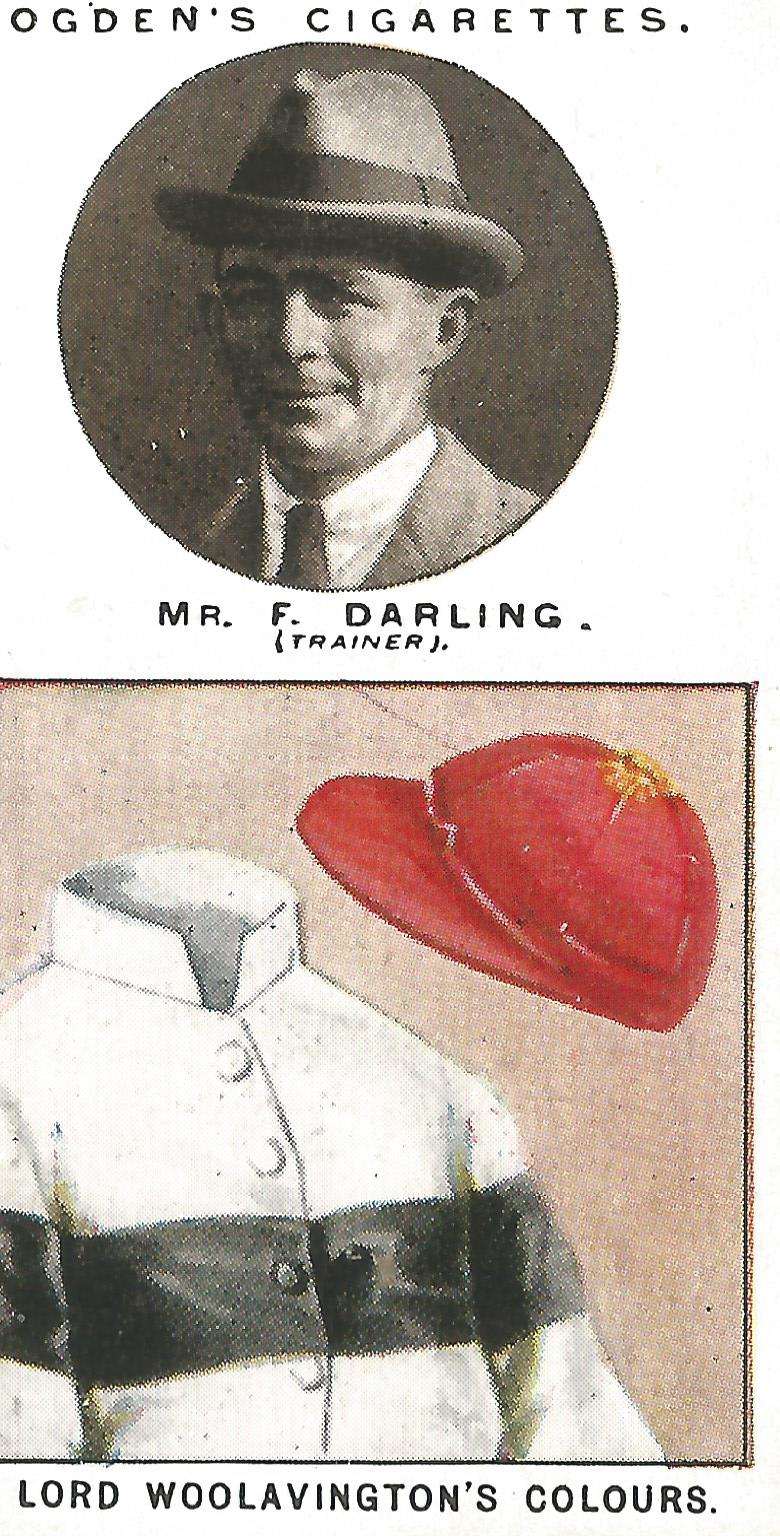
Fred Darling and Lord Woolavington's racing colours by Ogden's 1925
