= Rugby card =

Trading card

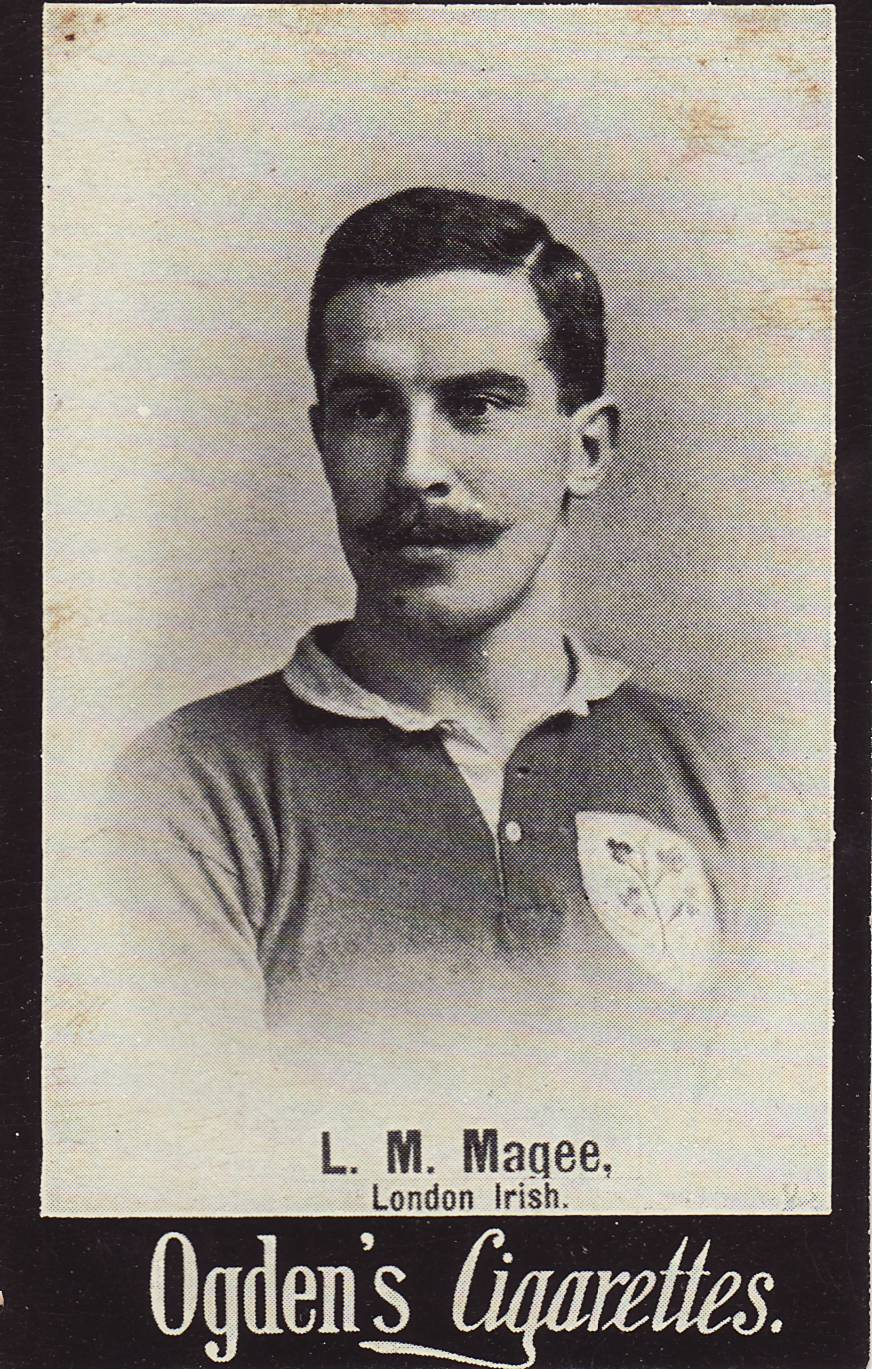
- One of the earliest rugby cards (depicting Louis Magee) issued by Ogden's in 1902
- Other names: Rugby union card
- Type: Trading card
- Company: Select; Topps
- Country: United Kingdom; Australia
- Availability: c. 1902–present
- Features: Rugby union Rugby league

A Rugby card is a type of trading card relating to rugby football codes, usually printed on cardboard, silk, or plastic. These cards are most often found in the Australia, New Zealand and other countries where the sport is popular.

== History ==
Early versions of rugby union trading cards came at the beginning of 20th century, when tobacco companies released their cigarette card series. The first collections consisted on black and white photographs of rugby players, such examples of this were series issued by Ogden and W.D. & H.O. Wills (both in 1902) and Taddy (1906). Later collections featured color illustrations of player portraits (Ogden, 1906) and live actions (issued by Gallagher in 1912).

In successive decades, other tobacco manufacturers launched series. In 1926, Ogden released a new black and white series of players. The same year, John Player & Sons released a series that consisted of caricatures of rugby players. In 1935, W.A. & A.C. Churchman released an illustrated series displaying player portraits.

Australian company Scanlens produced its first rugby league set in 1963, releasing several collections during the 1970s and 1980s. Other companies that produced cards were Stimorol (1988–91) and Regina (1992–93), until Dynamic Market took over the contract to produce rugby league cards in Australia.

Another Australian company, "Select Cards", entered into the business in 2000. The company was the official licensee for National Rugby League (NRL) cards (2010–12). Since then, the NRL licensed company "Elite Sport Properties" (ESP) to produce trading cards. The NRL also released its own collections, Startoons, featuring caricatures of players.

== Collections ==
Some rugby union/rugby league card collections released through the years include:

Year	Manufacturer	Series	Type, format
1902	Ogden's	Footballers	Black and white photographs of players
1902	Wills	Footballers	Black and white photographs of players
1902	Cadle's	Footballers	Black and white photographs of players
1906	Taddy	Footballers	Black and white photographs of players
1906	Ogden's	Football Club Colours	Illustrations of players
1909	Churchman	Football Club Colours	Illustrations of players
1915	Fred Morgan	Welsh Footballers & Cricketers	Black and white photographs of players
1926	Ogden's	Famous Rugby Players	Black and white photographs of players
1926	Player's	Footballers	Caricatures of players
1927	Wills	New Zealand footballers	Black and white photographs of players (Note: Featuring New Zealand internationals.)
1928	Player's	Footballers (Note: The word footballers included in this case several codes of football, from rugby union to association football)	Illustrations of players
1929	Wills	Rugby internationals	Caricatures of players
1930	Wills	Rugby players	Black and white photographs of players
1935	Churchman	Internationals	Illustrations of players
1935	Ogden's	Football Caricatures	Caricatures of players
1938	United Tobacco	British Rugby Tour of S. Africa (Note: Featuring players of British and Irish Lions and South African players.)	Black and white player photographs of players
1963	Scanlens	Football Gum	Color photographs of players (Note: Rugby league players.)
1976	KFC	All Blacks	Black and white photographs of players
1995	Rugby Australia	The Wallabies	Color photographs of players (Note: Featuring players of Australia national team)
1995	Futera	Rugby Union 1995	
1995	Dynamic Marketing	'95 Contenders	Color photographs of players
1996	Card Crazy Authentics	Rugby Superstars	Color photographs of players (Note: Featuring New Zealand provincial players.)
1998	Panini	Premier Division 98	Color photographs of players, teams, and emblems (Note: Related to Premiership Rugby.)
2006–09	Tazo, Smith's	NRL	Colour photographs of select players, teams, emblems both past and present.
2016	Tap'n'Play	Super Rugby	Color photographs of players (Note: Featuring Super Rugby players.)
2019	Glenisk	Irish Rugby	Color photographs of players (Note: Featuring Ireland international players.)
2020	NRL	Startoons	Caricatures of players (Note: Featuring NRL players.)
