= Edward Wharton-Tigar =

Edward Wharton-Tigar (1913–1995) was a decorated World War II spy, saboteur and prominent mining executive and was also recognised by the Guinness Book of World Records for amassing over two million cigarette cards – the world's largest collection, now bequeathed to the British Museum.

He worked for a London-based international mining company, Selection Trust, in Yugoslavia before joining the Special Operations Executive (SOE). He planned and carried out a daring act of sabotage by destroying, whilst working undercover, a cliffside house in Tangier, Morocco, from which Germans had been using infrared equipment to track vessels passing through the Strait of Gibraltar and had been providing information to German submarines. The operation was a resounding success, with two U-boats being pin-pointed and sunk by the Royal Navy as a result.

Later, while still working for the SOE, Wharton-Tigar organized black market trading in currencies, jewels and other valuables in Asia on an unprecedented scale, financing much of the Allied cause in that part of the world.

After the war, he rejoined Selection Trust and as managing director for 11 years, The Times of London reported, he quadrupled the value of its international interests, before its eventual sale to BP.

He was the president of the Cartophilic Society of Great Britain until his death in 1995.
