= Association football card =

Type of collectible card

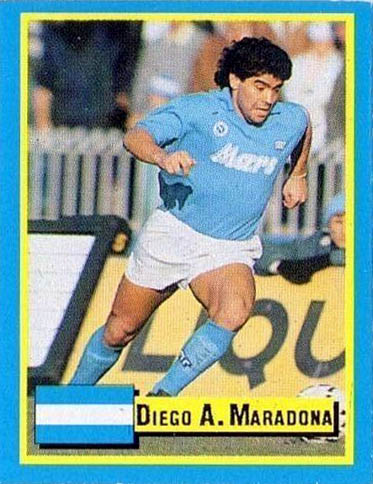
- Diego Maradona card issued by Panini
- Other names: Soccer card
- Type: Trading card
- Company: Panini; Futera; Topps; Merlin Publishing
- Country: Worldwide
- Availability: 1887–present
- Features: Association football

An association football card (or simply football card) is a type of trading card relating to association football, usually printed on cardboard, silk, or plastic. These cards feature one or more players, clubs, stadiums, or trophies. Football cards are most often found in Europe, Asia, and South America.

Some notable producing companies include Panini Group (which has published cards of all FIFA World Cups since 1970 and has a presence in more than 120 countries) and Topps (the UEFA Champions League, MLS, and the Premier League).

== History ==
=== Early cards ===
As earlier as 1887, John Baines started producing and selling die-cut football cards in the shape of shields of different football teams and featured generic players representing the teams.

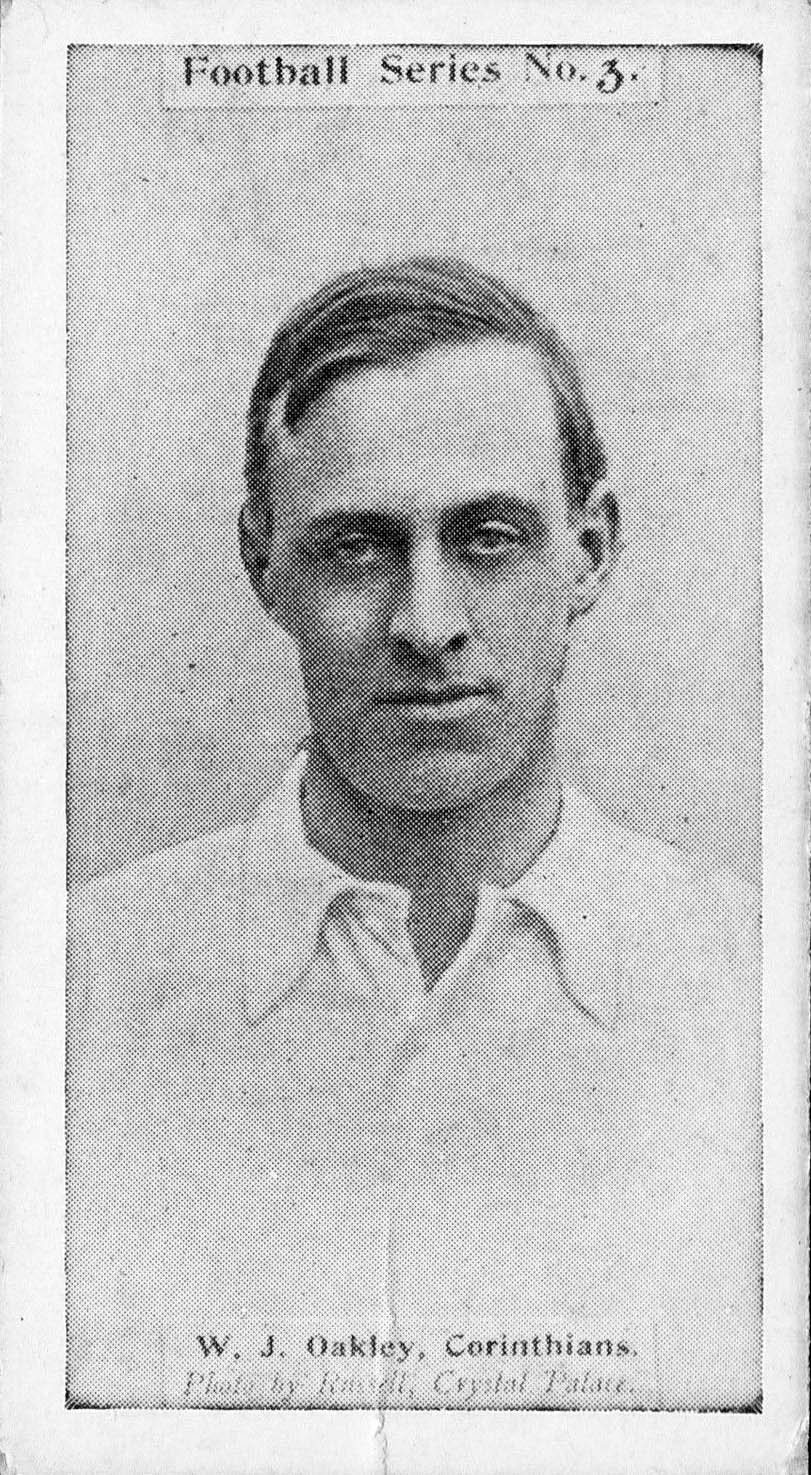
W.J. Oakley, footballer depicted on a Wills's earlier card of 1902

The earliest documented cigarette football card appears to be issued from a cigarette brand called Field Favorites depicting Duncan MacLean of Liverpool F.C. However, the earliest cigarette association football cards from a known set are Billy Bassett and Charlie Athersmith from Godfrey and Phillips “General Interest” in 1896.

Football cards were also produced circa 1896–1898 by the Marcus & Company Tobacco in Manchester, England. The set consisted of over 100 cards and was issued under the title of "Footballers & Club Colours". They featured illustrated images of players on the front of the card, and a tobacco advertisement on the back of the card. The tobacco companies soon realised that sports cards were a great way to obtain brand loyalty. Production of football cards spread over the United Kingdom. Other football sets issued at that time were released by other tobacco manufacturers such as Kinner (1898), Ogden's (1902), J.F. Bell (1902), F.J. Smith (1902), W.D. & H.O. Wills (1902), Percy E. Cadle (1904) and Singleton & Cole.

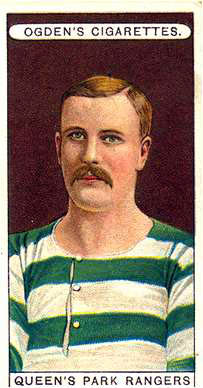
Queens Park Rangers by Ogden's Cigarettes, 1906. This company was one of the first to introduce full-color cards in football

One of the first full-colour sets was released in 1906 by Ogden's. The set of cards depicted illustrations of footballers in their club shirts. The set (properly named "Football Club Colours") featured clubs Everton, Aston Villa, Wolverhampton Wanders, Newcastle United, Blackburn Rovers, Middlesbrough, Tottenham Hotspur, Sheffield United and Arsenal. The following year, Cohen Weenen published a similar series entitled "Football Club Captains". This included captains of lower divisions teams of English football.

Taddy & Company introduced the oval-shaped images on its cards, with the collection "Prominent Footballers" of 1907 that consisted of 595 cards. Other cards manufacturers were Churchman's cigarettes, that in 1914 launched an illustrated series featuring action pictures with individual portraits as inserts, and Godfrey Phillips Ltd. (a tobacco company from India, a British colony by then) and Lacey's.

Argentina is probably the oldest producer of football cards in South America, when local tobacco company "Cigarrillos Monterrey" released a series about Primera División teams. Cards showed full-colors illustrations of players in their club colours. Another popular series was released in 1925 by "Cigarrillos Dólar", with hand-colored photographs of players and teams. In 1926, another cigarettes brand, "Cigarrillos Plus Ultra", released a set of cards featuring photos of teams and players.

=== Consolidation ===
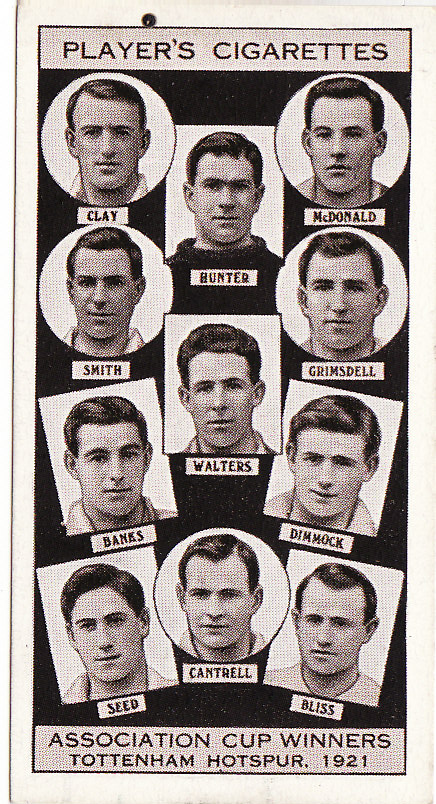
The winning Spurs team from the 1921 FA Cup Final produced by Player's

Taking advantage of the rise popularity of football cards in the 1920s, Godfrey Phillips released collections in 1920, 1922 and 1923. Lacey's also produce its own series of cards in 1925. Ogden's reintroduced the illustration in card with the "Captains of Association Football Clubs and Colours" series with paintings of players that captained in their respective clubs. Following the trend, John Player & Sons (or "Player's"), produced three consecutive series of illustrated cards: the first in 1926 consisting in caricatures of notable players by R.P. Hill (signed as "RIP"), another with caricatures by cartoonist George Douglas Machin (signed as "MAC") in 1927, and the last in 1928 (with no artist credited).

In 1928, Gallaher published the "Football in Action" series, depicting illustrated scenes of matches in England. Another illustrated series by Player's came in 1934, "Hints on association football", it consisted of illustrations where some football movements (kicks, passes, defensive tactics, etc.) were shown. Gallaher released the series "Footballers in Action" in 1928. In 1930, Player's brought photograph to cards again with the series "Cup Winners", that homaged FA Cup winners teams of the past, although other companies continued printing illustrated cards in their new collections, such as Lambert & Butler (1931) and Carreras (1934, 1936), Godfrey Phillips (1934, 1936), Ardath (1934), W.D. & H. O. Wills (1935, 1939), Ogden's (two collections in 1935, the first featuring players of both sports, association football and rugby league, all illustrated by Machin). Photographs returned with Churchman in 1938 and 1939. The outbreak of the Second World War caused a severe shortage of paper, and tobacco companies were forced to bring an end to the production of cigarette cards.

In the 1940s Argentine manufacturers introduced smaller, circular-shaped cards, such as "Figuritas Bicicleta" in 1949 that featured photos of footballers and illustrations of clubs' badges. Other companies that produced circular cards were "Starosta", "Lali" and "Sport" and "Gran Crack" in the 1950s, followed by "Deportito", "Fulbito", "Golazo" and "Campeón" in the 1960s.

In 1967, "Figuritas Sport" collection introduced players' caricatures for the first time in Argentina. Those were drawn by artist Jorge de los Ríos (who was also the artist of children magazine Anteojito for the most part of its run). De los Ríos' depictions of players would become a classic in football cards during the 1960s, 1970s and 1980s. The breakthrough in Argentine card industry came in 1970 when the first metallic circular cards began to be marketed in the "Chapitas" album. They were promoted as "El golazo del año" ("Goal of the year").

=== Modern era ===
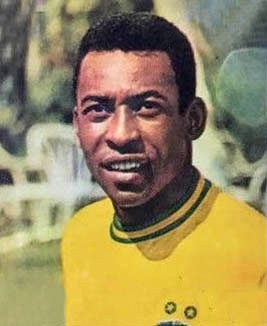
Pelé trading card from the Mexico 70 series, Panini's first FIFA World Cup collection

Italian company Panini started to produce football cards in 1961, when the company released a collection set about Serie A. Since then, Panini has been producing football cards until consolidating as the world's leading manufacturer.

In 1970 Panini began publishing L'almanacco Illustrato del Calcio Italiano (The Illustrated Guide to Italian Football), after purchasing the rights from publishing house Carcano. Panini also published its first FIFA World Cup sticker album for the 1970 World Cup in Mexico, in addition to using multilingual captions and selling stickers outside of Italy for the first time. Initiating a craze for collecting and trading stickers, Panini's stickers were an instant hit, with The Guardian stating in the UK "the tradition of swapping duplicate [World Cup] stickers was a playground fixture during the 1970s and 1980s". Another first for Panini, in the early 1970s, was introducing self-adhesive stickers, as opposed to using glue.

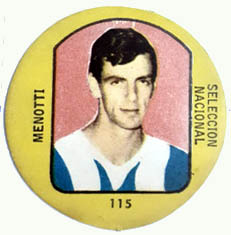
Circular shaped cards were very common and popular in Argentina. César Menotti is depicted on this "Deportito" card, 1963

In Spain, the first collection released by Panini was the 1974 World Cup album. The Spanish market introduced digital collections when Stampii, an internet company established in 2009, released one year later its first set of digital trading cards. Collectors were allowed to acquire sets or share their collections only through the web.

In the United States, Upper Deck (established in 1988), released a series for the 1994 World Cup featuring several sports personalities that promoted the competition. The same company launched several collections after a deal with Major League Soccer (MLS) in the 2000s. Another US company, Pacific Trading Cards, produced MISL/indoor soccer cards in the 1980s and 1990s. Moreover, Pro Set was licensor of the English Football League for its football cards of 1990–91. Wizards Of The Coast also had a brief stint producing Premier League players cards in 2001–02.

In the United Kingdom trading cards had been popular for many years but really boomed after England's 1966 World Cup victory. The leading manufacturer was a company called FKS Publishers which was probably a subsidiary of the Spanish printing company FHER of Bilbao. FKS produced football stickers and associated paraphernalia from 1966 till 1982.

Asian manufacturers include Futera, a United Arab Emirates company established in 1989 that got licenses of some of the most notable English clubs.

In May 2006, Panini partnered with The Coca-Cola Company and Tokenzone to produce the first virtual sticker album for the 2006 World Cup. The album was viewable in at least 10 different languages, such as Portuguese, Dutch, English, French, German, Greek, Italian, Japanese, Korean and Spanish. For the 2014 World Cup, three million FIFA.com users took part in the Panini Digital Sticker Album contest. Panini developed an app for the 2018 World Cup where fans could collect and swap virtual stickers. Five million people gathered digital stickers for the 2018 World Cup.

During the 2018 World Cup, Panini produced an average of 8 and 10 million card packages per day. In 2018, Panini signed a deal with English Premier League to produce cards under license since the 2019–20 season.

== Manufacturing companies ==
=== Past ===
Most of the past producers companies are defunct or have left the trading card business, they were:

- Marcus & Company: 1896
- Wills: 1902, 1935, 1939
- Singleton & Co.: 1905
- Ogden's: 1902, 1906, 1926, 1935
- Cohen Winnen: 1907
- Tadddy & Co.: 1907
- Churchman: 1909, 1914, 1938, 1939
- Godfrey Phillips: 1920, 1922, 1923, 1934, 1936
- Lacey's: 1925
- Player's: 1926, 1927, 1928, 1929, 1934
- Gallaher: 1928
- Lambert & Butler: 1931
- Carreras: 1934, 1936
- Ardath: 1934
- FKS: 1966–1982
- Pacific: 1980s–1990s
- Pro Set: 1990–91
- Upper Deck: 1993–2012
- Stampii (Note: Stampii was an internet company established in 2009 that released digital cards only.)
- Wizards Of The Coast: 2001–02
- Select Australia: 2007–10
- Merlin Publishing: 1989–2019 (Note: Bought by Topps in 1995, but continued as a brand until 2008 and then again 2014 to 2019.)

=== Current ===
Companies that currently produce football trading cards are:

Company	Establ.	Licenses
Futera	1989	Premier League (Note: Futera's Premier League licenses include Liverpool, Arsenal, Manchester City, Manchester United, Chelsea, Leeds, Aston Villa, West Ham, Celtic, Newcastle, Derby County, Middlesbrough), National Soccer League (Note: Soccer league of Australia, defunct in 2004.), "World Cup Greats" (Note: Great and legendary players of the FIFA World Cup. Some of the "legends" included in the collection are Carlos Alberto, Gordon Banks, Franz Beckenbauer, Bobby Charlton, Johan Cruyff, Eusebio, Garrincha, Mario Kempes, Diego Maradona, Pelé, Michel Platini, Ferenc Puskás, Romario, Karl Rummenigge, among others.)
Panini	1961	FIFA World Cup, UEFA Champions League, Copa América, Premier League, La Liga, Serie A, Argentine Primera División
Topps	1938	Bundesliga, MLS, Premier League, UEFA Champions League

== Gallery ==
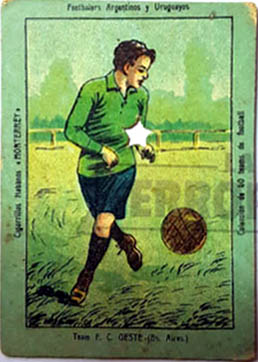
"Cigarrillos Monterrey" card c. 1911

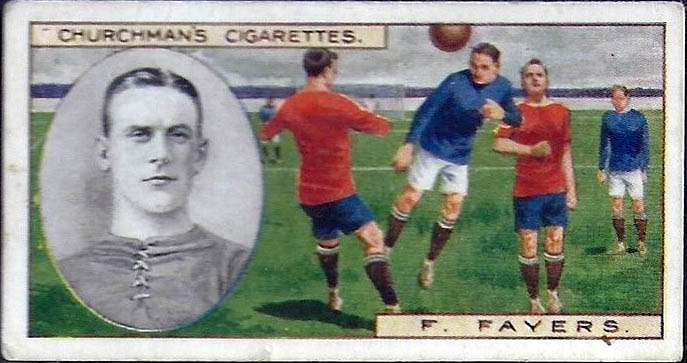
Churchman card, 1914

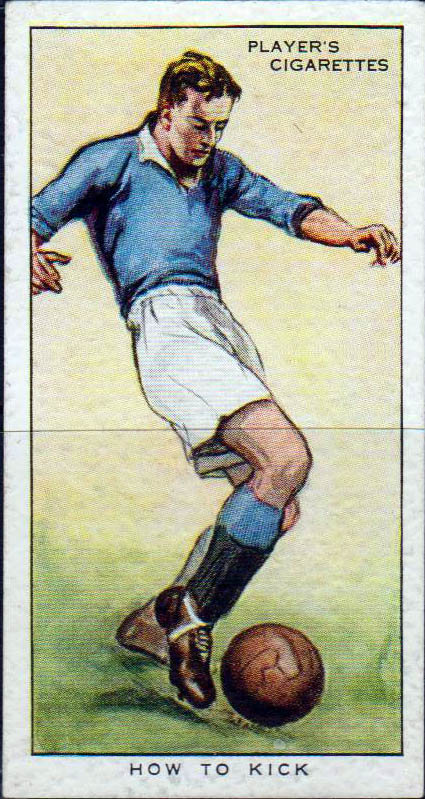
"Hints on association football" by Player's, 1934

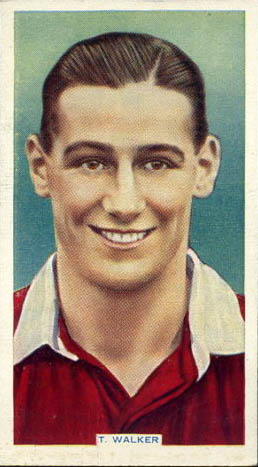
T. Walker card by Godfrey Phillips Ltd., 1936

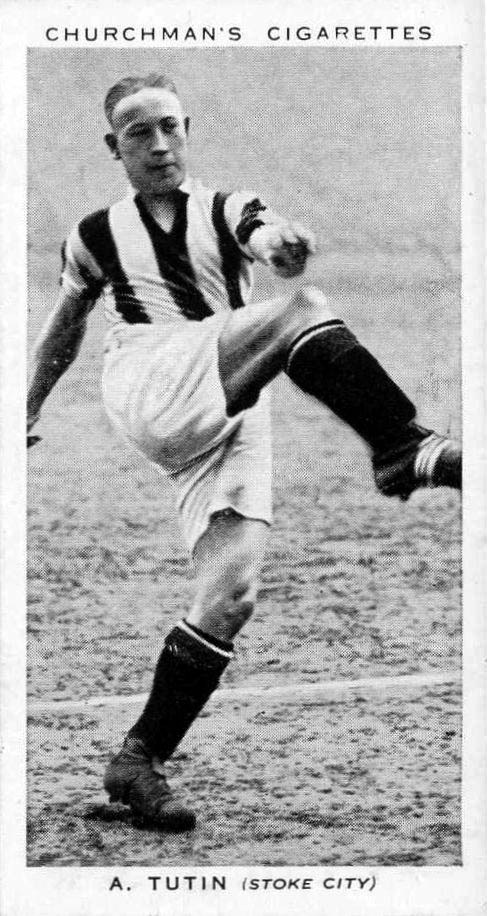
Arthur Tutin on a Churchman card, 1938

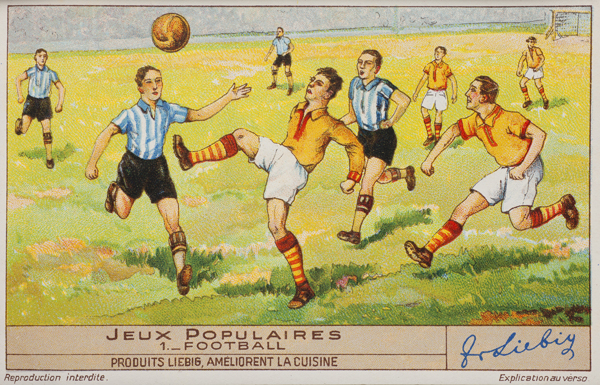
Liebid Chromos

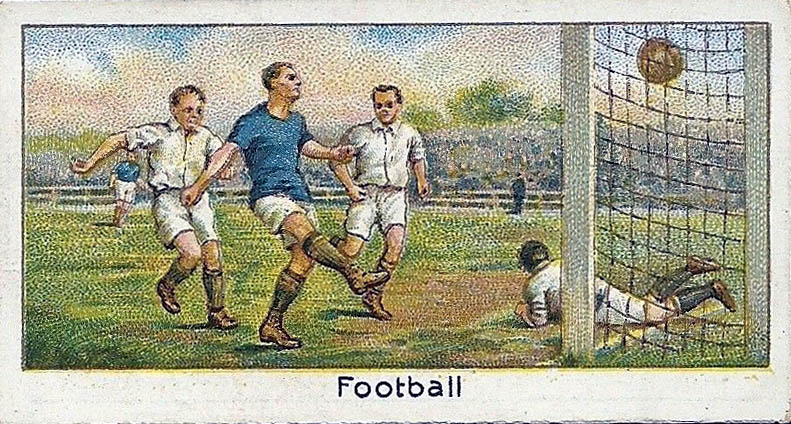
Boguslavsky card, 1925

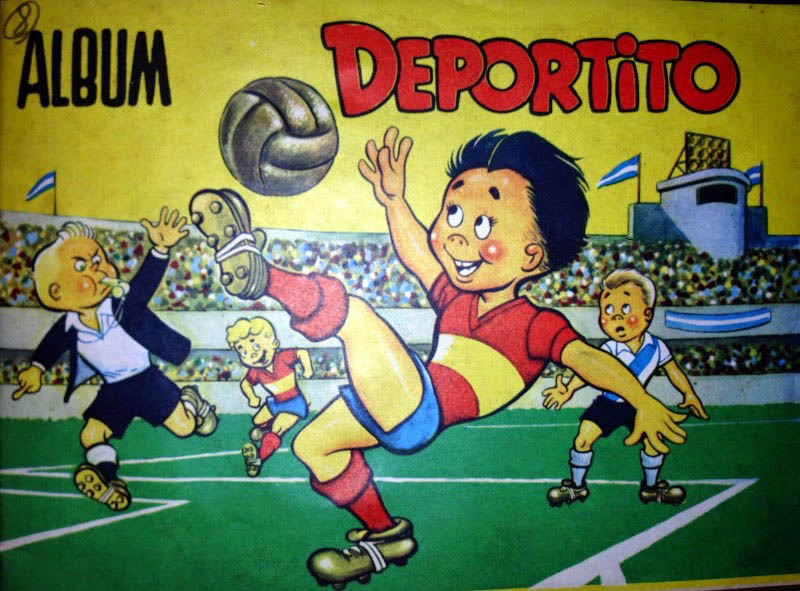
"Deportito" album cover, 1963

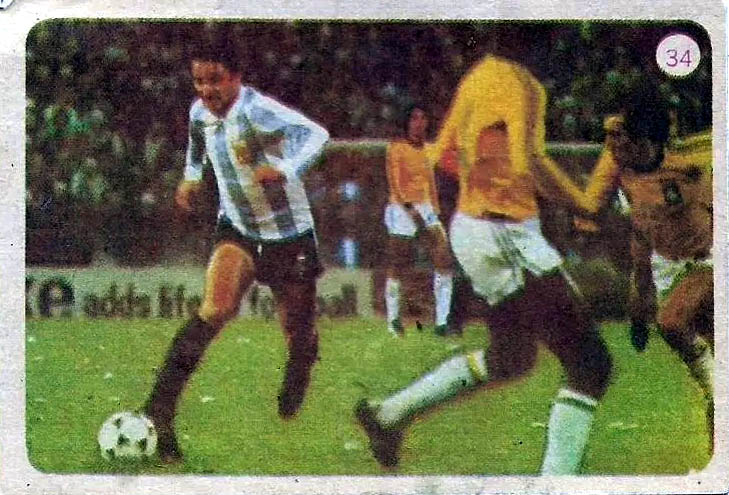
"Argentina Campeón Mundial" card, 1978

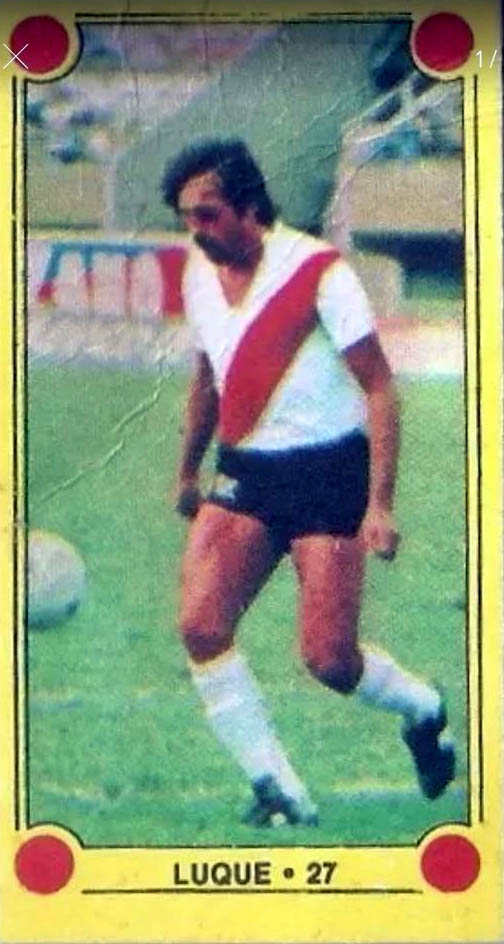
Leopoldo Luque "Deportistas Argentinos" card, 1980

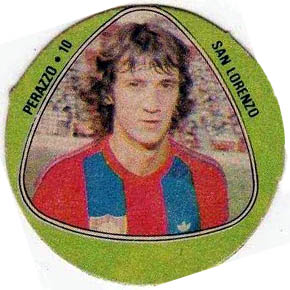
Walter Perazzo "Deportistas Argentinos" card, 1980
