= Futera =

Trading card company

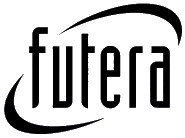
- Founded: 1989; 37 years ago in Dubai
- Headquarters: Dubai, UAE
- Products: Trading cards: Current: Association football; Former: Auto racing; Baseball; Boxing; Cricket; Cycling; Rugby; Surfing
- Website: futera.com

Futera is a trading card publisher founded in 1989. It is a privately owned company, its main markets being Asia, Europe, Australasia, US, with commercial and operational bases located in SE Asia, print and distribution facilities in UK/Europe and Asia-wide, and its headquarters in Dubai.

Currently focused on association football cards, Futera has been also produced several collections covering different topics and sports.

Non-sports cards by Futera include TV & film entertainment series.

As of 2021, Futera was one of the leading companies in the trading card business.

== Overview ==
Futera was established in 1989 and during its history has been the official licensee for football clubs around Europe including Barcelona, PSG, Liverpool, Arsenal, among others

Futera's sports cards included auto racing, baseball, basketball, boxing, cricket, cycle sport, horse racing, rugby, wrestling, and surfing.

Licenses included agreements with leagues and competitions such as Australian National Basketball League (NBL), Football Australia, Rugby Australia, Baseball Australia, Cricket Australia, Cricket World Cup)New Zealand Cricket, New Zealand Rugby League, Rugby Football Union, Tour de France, World Curling, F1.

Futera's licences extended to stickers, phonecards and confectionery with some clubs and in 2000 Futera created a licensed confectionery line called 'Total Football' combining Futera's football cards from 10 English Premier League and Championship football clubs with Chupa Chups lollipops.

Futera's non-sport licences have included Mattel's "Barbie", BBC television science fiction comedy Red Dwarf in association with Grant Naylor Film Productions, and the feature film Chicken Run with Universal Studios, Aardman Animations & Pathé.

Starting in the 2000s, Futera have focused on memorabilia and autograph cards as well as 24ct gold plated framed cards.

In 2021, a Lewis Hamilton Futera card sold for $312,000 in a Goldin auction.

== Other Futera activities ==
Futera launched their own football club named Futera United in 2021 allowing fans to help to manage the team via the blockchain and NFTs.
