= Scanlens =

Brand of trading cards

Scanlens is a brand of trading cards first produced in the 1930s and given away with packets of sweets and chewing gum.

The first sports-themed cards series were produced in limited quantities in 1963 featuring 18 players from the Victorian Football League and players in the New South Wales Rugby Football League and Queensland Rugby League competitions, which have since become highly sought-after, with some cards commanding a price of up to $2000 each. The record for a Scanlens card is $7,200, sold in 2014 and featuring Graham "Polly" Farmer; its high price was due to a misprint that greatly reduced supply. Scanlens went on to produce further modern card sets (sport and non-sport) between 1963 and 1991, many of which have since become collector's items.

== See also ==
- Australian rules football card
- Cricket card
- Rugby card
