= George H. Sutton =

American billiards player (1870–1938)

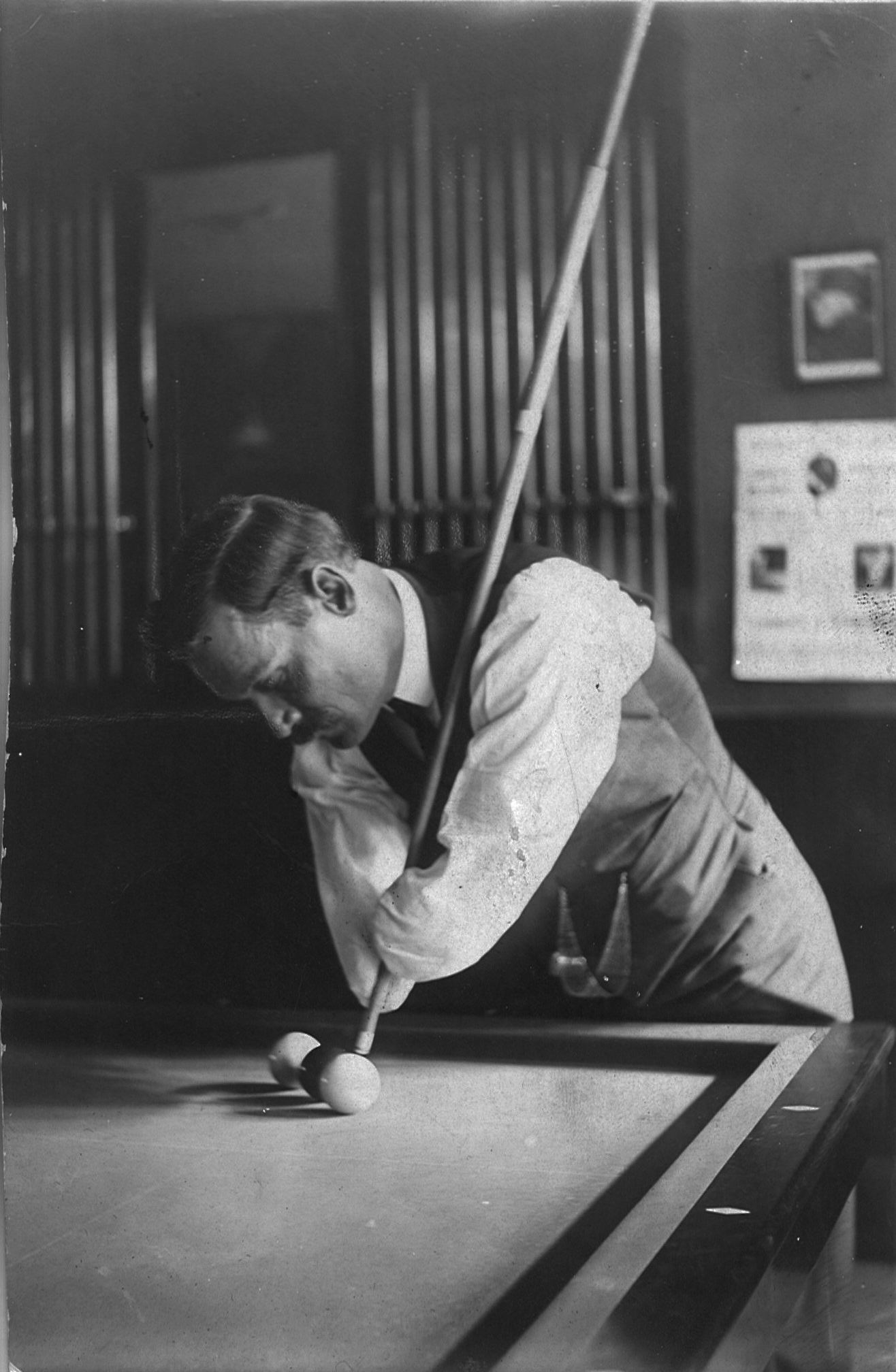
- George H. Sutton c. 1923
- Born: 1870
- Died: 15 May 1938; Toledo, Ohio
- Education: Wisconsin State College
- Occupation: Professional billiard player

George H. Sutton (1870–1938) known as the "handless billiard player", was a carom billiards professional in the United States and Europe in the early 1900s. He was called a "billiard expert" and he competed with other notable billiard professionals such as Willie Hoppe. Sutton had no arms below the elbows, which made his mastery of the game even more remarkable.

== Personal life ==
A Canadian by birth, George Sutton lost both of his arms below the elbows in a sawmill accident at the age of eight. He studied medicine, and graduated from Wisconsin State College (now the University of Wisconsin–Milwaukee). Sutton became a professional billiards player, competing for 35 years.

Sutton married Franziska Alvina (Frances) Renk (b. 1873). They had three surviving children; Bessie Cordelia (b. 1894), Lee George Jr. (1896–1965), and Earl Patrick (1898–1935). Sutton died of a heart attack in Toledo, Ohio, at the age of 68. He toured up until the final year of his life. During this US tour, Sutton gave lectures and appeared in exhibitions as an employee of a Chicago billiard company.

== Professional career ==
Sutton learned to play billiards while he was in college, and he set world record in balkline competitions. In 1908, he went to Paris for eight months, where he was contracted to play in billiards matches with other Americans at the Café Olympia. Sutton used no artificial devices, holding the cue between his two elbows, and providing propulsion from the strong and flexible muscles in the stumps of his severed arms. A film clip from the turn of the 20th century is known to exist showing Sutton as he demonstrates his abilities.
