= Lambert & Butler =

Former English tobacco manufacturing company

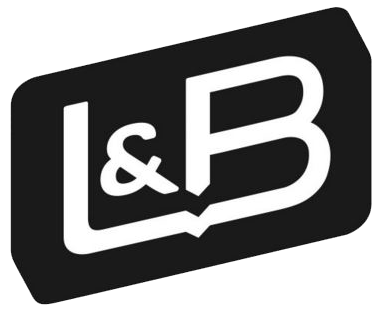
- Type: Private (1834–1901); Subsidiary (1901–1958)
- Industry: Tobacco
- Founded: 1834 in Clerkenwell
- Founder: Charles Lambert & Charles Butler
- Defunct: 1958; 68 years ago
- Fate: Merged to form Imperial Tobacco in 1901, closed factories in 1958
- Successor: Imperial Tobacco
- Headquarters: England
- Products: Cigarettes
- Owner: Imperial Tobacco

Lambert & Butler is a former English tobacco manufacturing company, established in 1834 in Clerkenwell, Central London, which operated as a private business until 1901, when it merged with other UK manufacturers to form the Imperial Tobacco Company. Apart from tobacco products, L&B also released several cigarette card sets from the 1910s to the 1930s. They consisted of various topics, including motor cars, locomotives, horsemanship, aviation, and association football.

Nowadays, L&B is a brand owned and commercialised by Imperial Brands. Lambert & Butler is mainly commercialised in the United Kingdom, having been exported to Luxembourg, Netherlands, Germany, France, Austria, Spain and Egypt. Lambert & Butler is the second-most popular cigarette brand in the UK (As of November 2025).

== History ==
Lambert & Butler cigarettes were launched in Clerkenwell in 1834 by Charles Edward Lambert (1814–1887) and Charles Butler (1813–1882), who were among the earliest British cigar manufacturers.

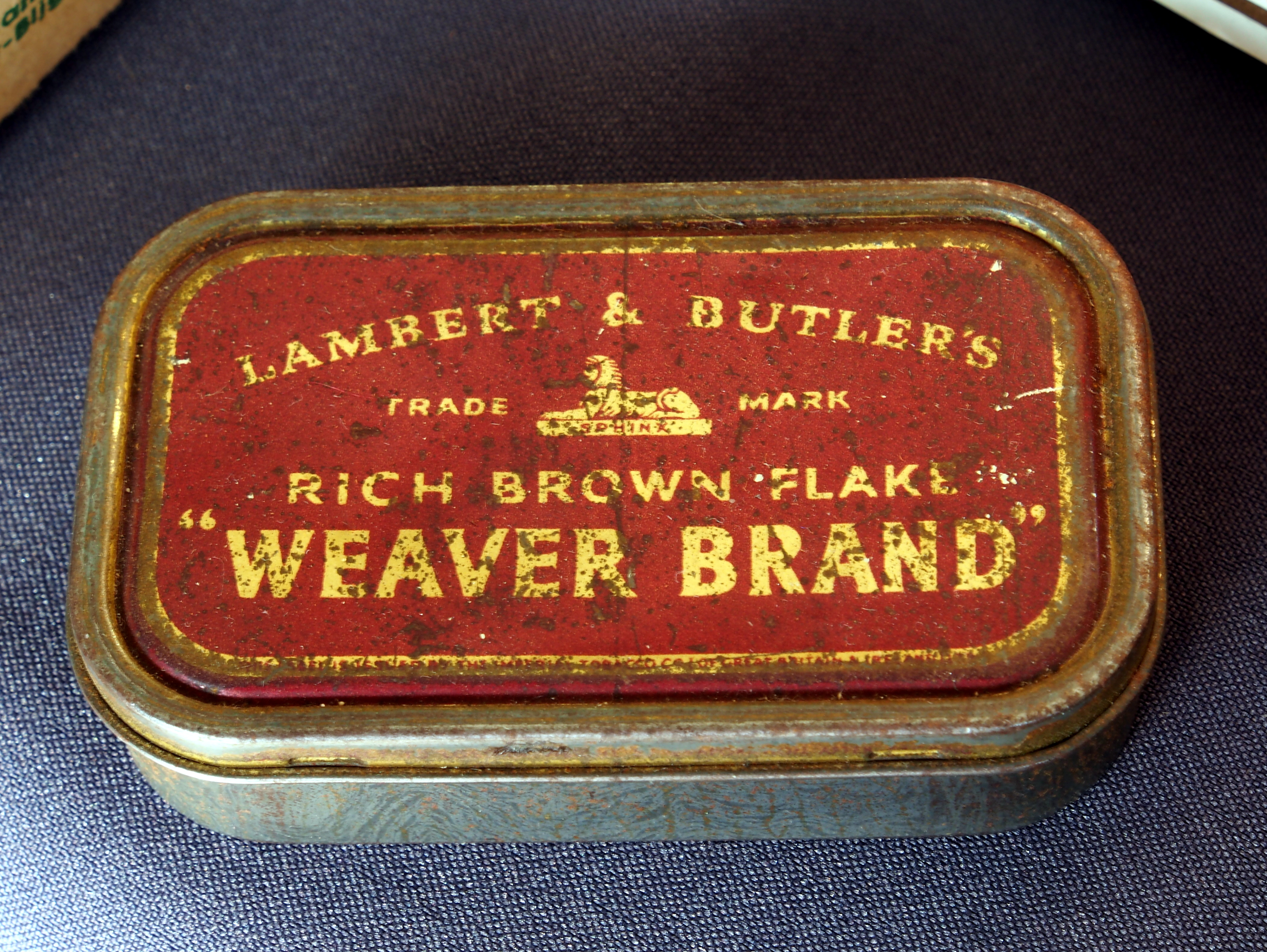
Vintage Lambert & Butler "Weaver" brand

They eventually started selling cigarettes which were being manufactured by John Wood & Son before Lambert & Butler started manufacturing it themselves in 1876 before merging with Imperial Tobacco in 1901. In the late-1800s, it accounted for 20% of total sales value and controlled a large piece of the market with an 1870 capital of £87,200 and 1887 total capital of £175,000, alongside major companies W.D. & H.O. Wills (now Imperial Tobacco) Cope Bros & Co, Hignett Tobacco, John Player & Sons and Stephen Mitchell & Son. In this time, the largest company in the industry was Wills followed by Cope with Lambert & Butler a strong third and one of Lambert & Butler's most popular brands was Best Bird's Eye.

In 1903, after merging with Imperial, an executive committee was formed with one of the members being Charles Lambert. Lambert & Butler also exported to Jamaica with the brands Trumpeter and Needle Point. It established its own bonded warehouse in 1891 and was located on Bucknall Street near Long Acre in Westminster, London. Charles Lambert, who was called "the best judge of a Havana cigar" also ran a tobacco shop on Drury Lane. Lambert & Butler was also part of the "big six", with Wills, Taddy & Co, Cope Bros, Hignett Bros and John Player & Sons.

Taking advantage of the rise in popularity of football cards in the 1920s and 1930s, Lambert & Butler released a set of association football trading cards in 1931. It consisted of a series of painted portraits that included West Ham's star centre-forward, Vic Watson. Nevertheless, the outbreak of World War II forced tobacco companies to cease production of cigarette cards.

In 1958, the remaining L&B factory was closed. Production continues at other Imperial Tobacco subsidiaries. The Drury Leane headquarters were closed in 1961.

The brand was relaunched in 1979 after an absence. In the late 1990s, their campaign was a distinguished Lambert with his calm butler, Butler, exchanging humorous quotes, until the last one, which had their faces blurred and the butler saying "Looks like we've been outlawed, Sir". In 1999, Lambert & Butler owned 17% of the British cigarette market, 5% more than Benson & Hedges. Due to Imperial Tobacco not owning the trademark on the original name, Lambert & Butler is known in some countries as either L&B or Great & British. It is among the popular and less expensive local brands, and, as of 2007, Lambert & Butler King Size were the best-selling brand of cigarettes in the UK.

In 2010, the Lambert & Butler brand was officially trademarked under the following words: "L&B LAMBERT & BUTLER ORIGINAL". The brand appealed a file for registration on 17 July 2013 and became officially registered on 22 July 2014.

In 2016, the last factory that still produced cigarettes in Nottingham, United Kingdom, which also produced Lambert & Butler cigarettes, closed its doors for the final time. Imperial Tobacco moved the production to either Poland or Germany, which would increase their profits to £320,000,000.

It currently holds 11% of the UK cigarette market and is the second-most popular brand.

== Products ==
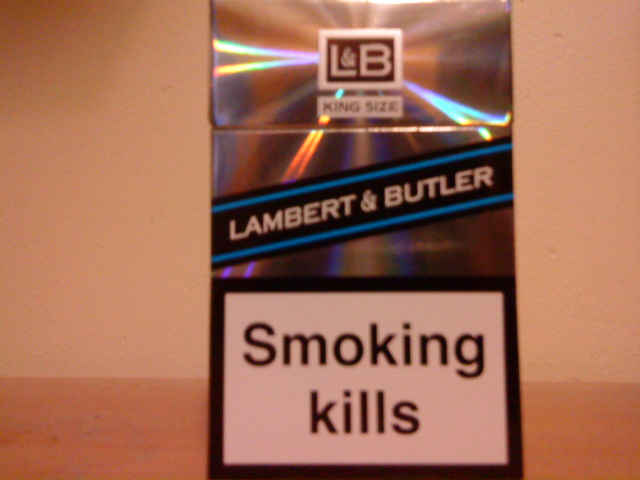
An old British packet of Lambert & Butler cigarettes, with an English language text warning at the bottom of the pack

Lambert & Butler cigarettes are sold in silver full strength, silver superkings, gold (formerly lights) and menthol. "Glide Tec" Packs are also now for sale and fast becoming the standard pack for this brand. These packs have a small window on the front of the pack which allows the user to slide up the inner pack with their thumb. This lifts the lid of the outer pack, and the inner pack containing the cigarettes slides out to reveal the cigarettes. Glide Tec packs are available in the silver, gold and menthol king size variants. In 2002, following a European Union ban on descriptive labels on tobacco, Lambert & Butler renamed its Lights band to Gold and its Ultra Lights to Blue.

In April 2012, Lambert & Butler Fresh Burst and Lambert & Butler Profile were added to the range. Lambert and Butler Fresh Burst cigarettes contain a capsule within the filter-tip, which when squeezed, pops and mentholates the cigarette. Lambert and Butler Profile Cigarettes are thinner in diameter, targeted at the busy smoker, who desires a cigarette which provides the same nicotine level as a standard size cigarette but in a smaller package, making the cigarette quicker to smoke. Fresh Burst and Profile are available in price marked or standard 20 packs.

In February 2014, Imperial Tobacco announced they would expand their Lambert & Butler range with a new variant called L&B Blue. It would be available from the 3rd of March 2014 onwards.

In May 2015, a survey concluded that Lambert & Butler Kingsize was the most popular variant in the range in 2013 and 2014, followed by Lambert & Butler Gold, Lambert & Butler Menthol and Lamber & Butler White.

In May 2020, Lambert & Butler Menthol, Lambert & Butler Crushball and Lambert & Butler Ice Burst were banned due to menthol cigarettes becoming outlawed across Europe, including the United Kingdom.

== See also ==
- Cigarette
- Tobacco smoking
- Association football trading card
