= Churchman's =

Former British cigarette manufacturing company

W.A. & A.C. Churchman
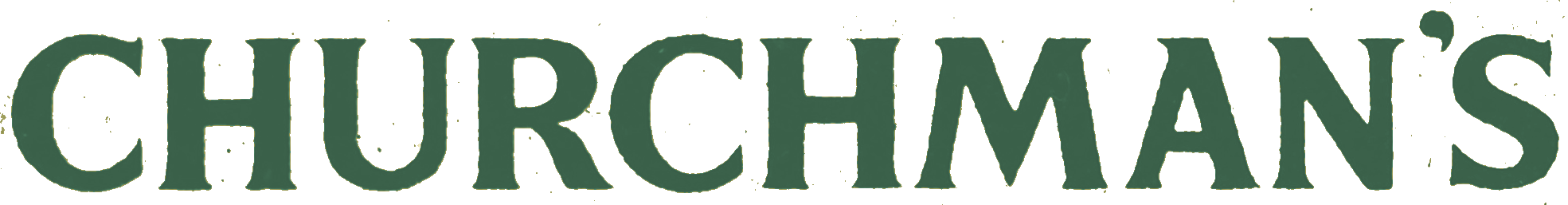
- Type: Private (1790–1972); Subsidiary (1972–1992)
- Industry: Tobacco
- Founded: 1790
- Founder: William Churchman
- Defunct: May 1992; 34 years ago
- Fate: Joined Imperial Tobacco in 1902
- Headquarters: Ipswich, England
- Area served: Worldwide
- Key people: Arthur C. Churchman
- Products: Cigarettes, collectible cards
- Owner: Imperial Tobacco Co.
- Number of employees: 400 (1992)
- Parent: John Player & Sons

Churchman's (originally W.A. & A.C. Churchman) was a British cigarette manufacturer based in Ipswich, Suffolk. The company was a subsidiary of John Player & Sons of Imperial Tobacco Co. Churchman was notable for producing one million cigarettes a day.

The company also released (like many other tobacco manufacturers at that time) a line of collectible cards about diverse topics, but mainly focused on sports.

== History ==
Churchman's was founded by William Churchman in 1790. The original shop, which sold pipe tobacco, was located at Hyde Park Corner in Ipswich.

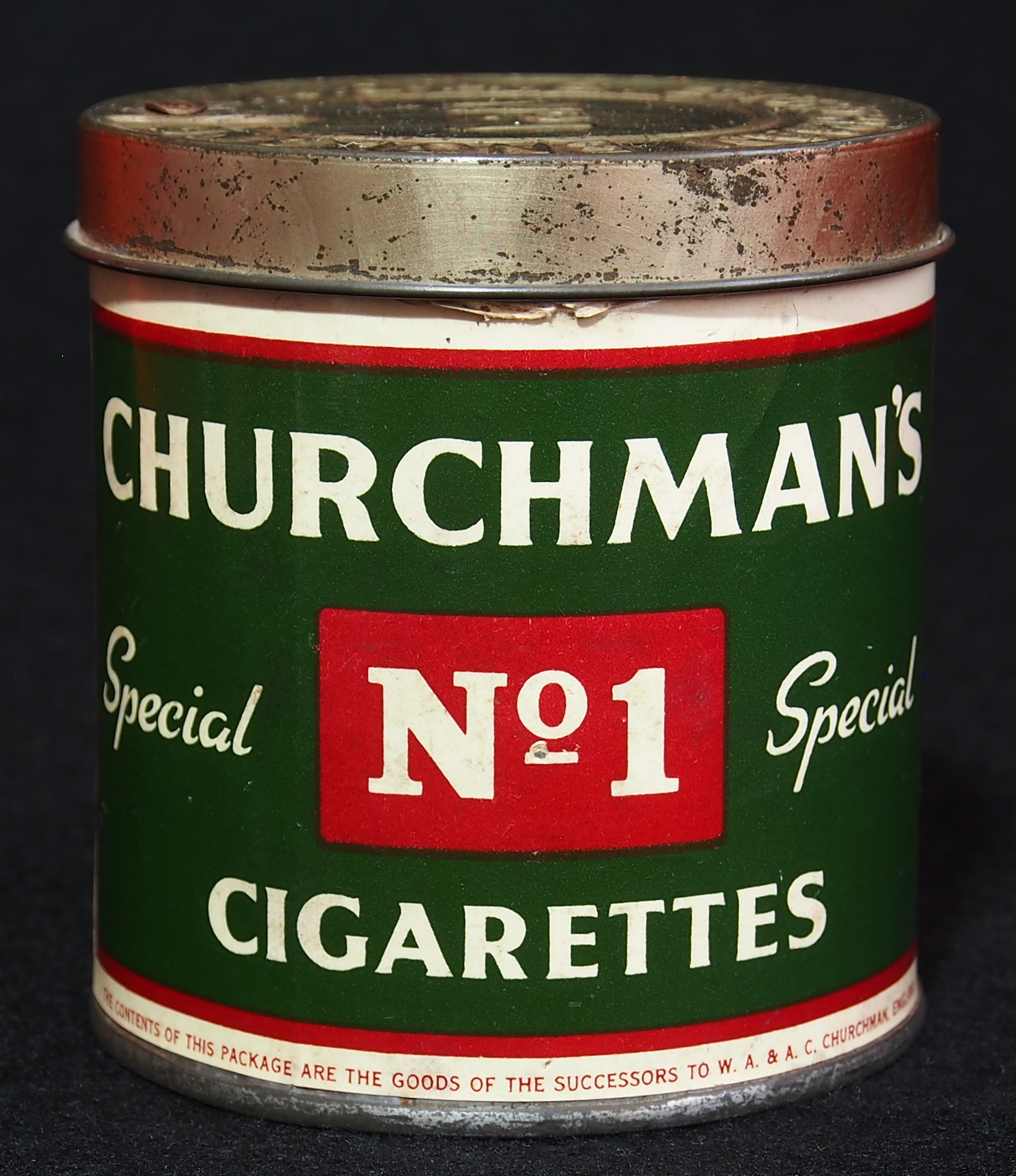
Churchman's n° 1 tin

In 1888 William Alfred (later Sir William) and Arthur Charles Churchman (later Lord Woodbridge and a director of the British American Tobacco from 1904 to 1923), grandsons of the founder, succeeded their father, Henry, in the business. By 1890 the company also produced "white cigarettes", and six years later produced 20,000 cigarettes an hour. To counter the aggressive American invasion to the British cigarette market (started when W. Duke Sons & Co., and four of the largest American manufacturers merged to form the American Tobacco Company in 1890), W.D. & H.O. Wills, John Player & Sons, Lambert & Butler, Hignett Brothers (with their associated firms) and Stephen Mitchell & Son, with six other firms, joined forces to found the Imperial Tobacco Company, Ltd., in 1901. Churchman joined the recently formed company the following year.

As the company expanded with increased sales, it opened a new facility at the junction of Portman Road and Princes Street. This factory would be extended during the 1920s and 1930s. In 1961 Churchman merged with Lambert & Butler and Edwards, Ringer & Bigg, to become first "Churchman, Lambert & Ringer", then renamed simply "Churchman's" in 1965. By that year, manufacturing of cigars concentrated the factory's production, with more than 1 million cigars per day and 1,000 employees working at Churchman's.

In 1972, the cigar business was integrated with John Player & Sons, with Churchman's becoming a subsidiary of it. Twenty years later, JP&S moved its operations to Bristol and Churchman closed.

== Cigarette cards ==
Churchman produced several sets of cigarette cards to advertise its products, beginning in the first years of 20th century, most of them related with sports, mostly association football sets. The first football set included rugby union players and appeared in 1909, featuring illustrated footballers of both codes in their clubs' shirts. Other football sets were released in 1914, 1938 and 1939 but only related to association football. Other sports series released included athletics, cricket, golf, and tennis.

Churchman also released a railway series in 1935, and an athletes series (featuring photographs of sportsmen of diverse disciplines) in 1939.

Gallery
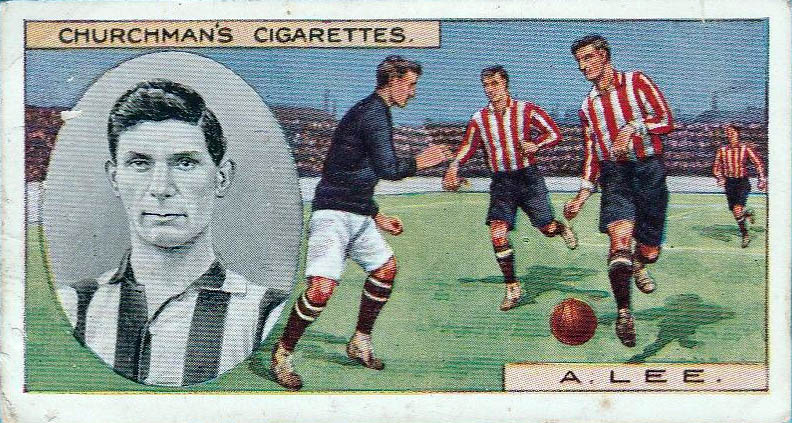
Albert Lee

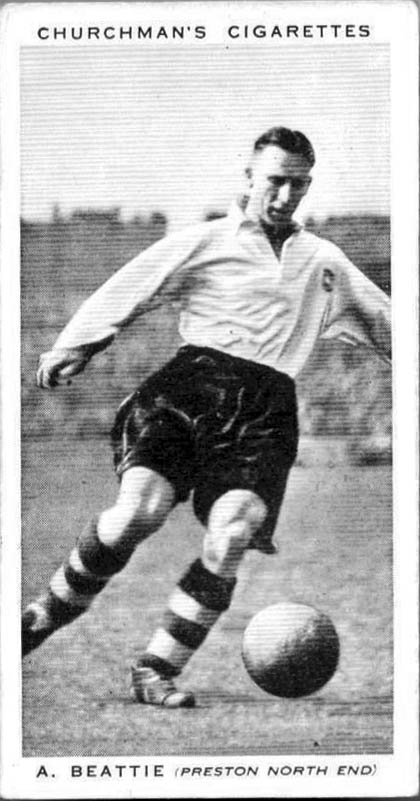
A. Beattie

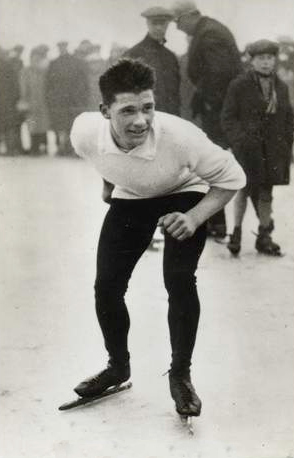
Cyril Horn

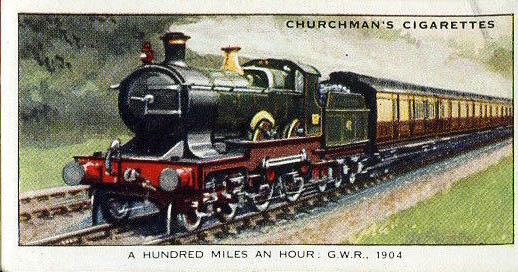
GWR locomotive

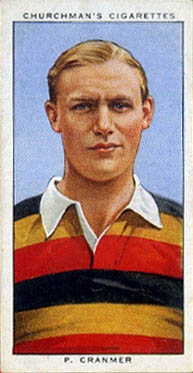
P. Cranmer

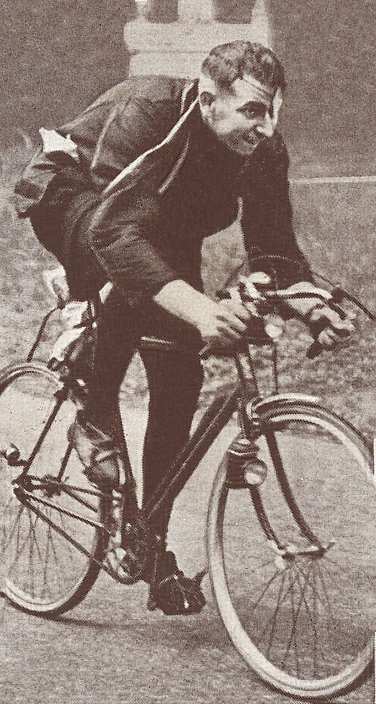
Sid Ferris
