= Refractor card =

Type of trading card

- Other names: Prizm card; Mirror card
- Type: Trading card
- Invented by: Topps
- Company: Topps; Panini; Leaf
- Country: United States
- Availability: 1993–present

A refractor card is a trading card that has a reflective coating and displays a rainbow when held at a specific angle. They are parallels of base set issues and were introduced with the release of the 1993 Topps "Baseball's Finest" set.

Later releases have confirmation of a Refractor on the back of the card in the form of either an R or the word 'Refractor' printed, usually, beside or beneath the card number, but the first Refractors did not include this designation and are therefore sometimes more difficult to differentiate from base issues. The term "Refractor" is a registered trademark of Topps, so other companies use names like Prizms or Mirrors for similar cards.

== Variants ==
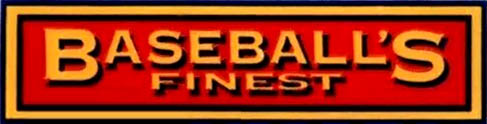
Logo of the "Baseball Finest" series issued by Topps in 1993, the first Refractor cards ever

There are many Refractor variants that have been produced over the years, though most are simple color swaps of the base Refractors. These variants are typically serial numbered, but that is not always the case. The very first Refractor variant that was available was the Embossed Refractor, in 1997.

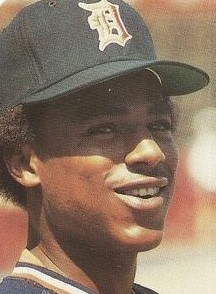
Lou Whitaker was one of the players included in the first set of cards

Variants that typically appear in Topps Finest, Topps Chrome, and Bowman Chrome releases often include Gold, Blue, Red, Orange, Green, and Black. Less often, Refractor color variants including Pink, Purple, and White can be found. Usually, the Orange and Red Refractor parallels are extremely rare and have low serial numbers, while the Blue and Green ones are more common. This is not always the case, though, and tends to vary slightly from set to set and year to year.

In addition to regular refractors and color swap refractors, Topps Chrome and Bowman Chrome (and on occasion Topps Finest) sometimes include a parallel called an Xfractor or X-fractor. They typically have a checkerboard background design in addition to the regular Refractor finish and sometimes have serial numbers. Xfractors sometimes have color swap issues available or even die-cut versions, too.

Bowman's Best sets have a unique issue called an Atomic Refractor that is much more rare than the regular Refractor parallel. Atomic Refractor parallels typically have serial numbers that are 4 times as low as the regular Refractors. For example, if a regular Refractor is numbered out of 400, then the Atomic version would be numbered out of 100. If the regular Refractor is numbered out of 100, the Atomic one would be numbered out of 25. In addition to the lower serial numbers, Atomic Refractors feature a different background design than regular Refractors.

The rarest refractor variant is called the "SuperFractor". It is a card that has a production run of just 1 and is serial numbered 1/1 (or sometimes "01/01," "001/001," or "One-of-One"). The backgrounds of SuperFractors have a gold spiral design, usually. There are even SuperFractor variants such as White SuperFractors, Bordered SuperFractors, and Die-cut SuperFractors in certain releases. These SuperFractor variants are all serial numbered 1/1, as well.

In recent years, some new Refractor variations have appeared in products. Among these include, but are not limited to Blue Wave Refractors (and color swaps of those), Sepia Refractors, Prism Refractors, Mosaic Refractors, and Pulsar Refractors.

Some Refractor variants were tested and found to be not popular and therefore discontinued. One example of this is the Pigskin Refractor which appeared in the 2009 Topps Finest Football release.

There have even been some special edition Refractors variants for specific purposes such as Camo Refractors, which feature a camouflage border pattern and were issued to honor the US Armed Forces, and BCA Pink Refractors, which were issued for Breast Cancer Awareness.

== Copycats ==
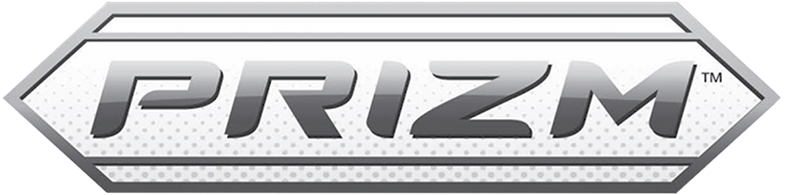
Logo of Prizm, the line of refractors issued by Panini Groop

Because the term Refractor is a registered trademark of The Topps Company, Inc., other sports card brands that offer similar parallel cards are not able to use the name "Refractor".

Some other names of similar issues include Reflectors (made by Press Pass), Prizms (made by Panini), and Mirrors (made by Leaf).
