= Pierluigi Consonni =

Italian footballer (1949–2020)

Personal information
- Date of birth: 14 January 1949
- Place of birth: Ponte San Pietro, Lombardy, Italy
- Date of death: 24 March 2020 (aged 71)
- Place of death: Ponte San Pietro, Lombardy, Italy
- Position: Defender

Senior career*
Years	Team	Apps	(Gls)
1968–1970	Ponte San Pietro	33+	(?)
1970–1971	Trevigliese	30	(?)
1971–1972	Derthona	38	(0)
1972–1977	Bari	162	(1)
1978–1979	Salernitana	32	(0)
1978–1980	Pergolettese	47	(0)
- * Club domestic league appearances and goals

Pierluigi Consonni (14 January 1949 – 24 March 2020) was an Italian professional footballer who played as a defender.

== Career ==
Consonni grew up with Ponte San Pietro, where he made his debut in the regional championships and later in Serie D, a category in which he also played in the 1970-1971 season with the Trevigliese.

After a year with Derthona in Serie C, he moved to Bari, where he played two championships in Serie B, totalling 65 appearances among cadets, and three more in Serie C.

He then played in Serie C with Salernitana and ended his career in 1980, playing with Pergocrema.

He died in his native Ponte San Pietro on 24 March 2020, aged 71, after contracting COVID-19 during the pandemic in Italy. Five days earlier Innocenzo Donina, also a former Bari player and also from the province of Bergamo, had succumbed to the same illness.

== Bibliography ==
- Arrigo Beltrami, Almanacco Illustrato del Calcio, Edizioni Panini, Modena 1974
- Arrigo Beltrami, Almanacco Illustrato del Calcio, Edizioni Panini, Modena 1975
