= Giuseppe Panini =

Italian entrepreneur (1925–1996)

- Panini at the Modena factory in 1966
- Born: 9 November 1925; Maranello, Modena, Italy
- Died: 18 October 1996 (aged 70); Modena, Italy
- Occupations: Entrepreneur; businessman
- Known for: Panini Group; Modena Volley
- Spouse: Maria (m. 1956)
- Children: 4

Giuseppe Panini (9 November 1925 – 18 October 1996) was an Italian entrepreneur, known for founding the Panini Group. He led the company bearing his name for many years, which became known for its stickers, trading cards and other collectibles. He was also involved in volleyball, establishing the successful club Modena Volley, and was inducted into the International Volleyball Hall of Fame in 2024.

== Early life ==
Panini was born on 9 November 1925 in Maranello, Modena, Italy, as one of eight children. He left school at age 11. He was a worker for Ferrari in 1940 and then for Fiat from 1941 to 1943. Panini ran a mechanical workshop following World War II with his brother, Umberto Panini [it], but later suffered from an illness in the late 1940s which led him to shut down the shop.

Afterwards, Panini began working for the family newsstand, which his mother and two of his brothers had acquired in 1945. In 1956, he and his brother started the Fratelli Panini Newspaper Distribution Agency, distributing the newspaper La Gazzetta dello Sport and later other items such as comics and stickers.

== Business career ==
=== Panini Group ===
In 1960, Panini purchased a collection of unsold football stickers from the Milan-based publisher Nannina. He then put the stickers in packs of four and began selling them in 1961. His idea became a success and he sold three million cards in his first year. He earned 10 million lire in his first year and then began producing more stickers. In his second year of production, he sold 15 million stickers.

Panini hired his three brothers to the business, the Panini Group, and began producing stickers on an "industrial" scale. He hired photographers from La Gazzetta dello Sport and several printers in Modena to make stickers based on photos of all the footballers in the Italian championship. Panini's stickers were printed on sheets of 90, then cut and packaged, and delivered to newsstands to sell. He also made albums for the stickers to be collected with. His idea became an "extraordinary success" and the business continually expanded. He moved to a larger headquarters in 1965 and made his business a joint-stock company, Edizioni Panini SpA. Ownership of the business was split between Giuseppe, president and CEO, his brothers Franco Cosimo Panini, vice president, Umberto, technical-production manager, and Benito, distributor.

As the business grew, Panini's family sold their distribution agency to focus solely on producing stickers. In the late 1960s, Panini began making other types of stickers, including ones relating to television series. The company also started selling stickers abroad starting in 1969, making sticker collections for Belgium and Switzerland footballers that year, before then starting branches for production in other countries including France in 1973, Germany in 1974, Great Britain in 1976, Greece in 1977 and the United States in 1979. Panini's business made 2.4 billion lire in 1972, and the profits had risen to 165 billion by 1986. Giuseppe Panini personally managed the business until the 1970s, when he gave most management to his brother Franco Cosimo, while retaining the title of president. During the 1980s, Panini controlled 70% of the world sticker market and had over 600 employees. In 1988, the Paninis sold their company to Robert Maxwell. By the time of Panini's death in 1996, the company he started had produced over 150 billion trading cards.

=== Volleyball career ===
Panini was interested in volleyball, and in 1966, he founded the Panini Sports Group, later known as the club Modena Volley. His team began in the third tier of Italian volleyball, but rose to the top tier within two seasons. He managed the club and helped it become "the largest and most successful volleyball club in the world," according to the International Volleyball Hall of Fame (IVHF). In 1973, he also was a co-founder of the Italian Volleyball League, which he later served as president of for eight years.

Panini led his club to eight Italian championships, six Italian cups, three Confederation Cups and one Championship Cup title. His club featured 14 players who were later inducted into the IVHF and Modena Volley also won 13 European trophies, including CEV Champions League title four times. He sold the club to industrialist Giovanni Vandelli in 1993.

== Personal life and death ==
Panini married Maria Maddalena Schiavi in 1956 and had four children with her. He served as president of the Modena Chamber of Commerce from 1985 to 1992 and was the founder of a school for business managers as well as a high school. He also ran a restaurant. A member of the Italian Socialist Party, Panini ran for election to the Senate of the Republic in 1992, but did not win a seat.

Panini had a personal collection of over 750,000 stickers from his company, which he donated to the Modena city council in 1992. He also collected accordions and newspapers; by the time of his death, he held every copy of La Gazzetta dello Sport that had been produced since 1929.

Panini died in Modena on 18 October 1996, at the age of 70. After his death, the court for the Modena Volley club was renamed PalaPanini in his honor. He was inducted into the International Volleyball Hall of Fame in 2024 as a leader.
