= List of 24 media =

The critical and popular success of the Fox television series 24 has led to the series being extended into other arenas, primarily media specifically created for mobile devices and the internet. In addition, the series has spawned video and board games, toys, soundtracks from both the series and the video game, and a number of original novels inspired by the series. There have been games (video and non-video), books, paperback novels, graphic novels, comics, action figures, trading cards and even an energy drink based on the show. 24 has even had its own bi-monthly official magazine that lasted for two years.

== Mobile media ==
=== 24: Conspiracy ===
24: Conspiracy is a low budget, cellphone-only spin-off of 24 set in Washington, D.C. It spans 24 one-minute episodes and takes place during Day 4, as indicated by a reference to the Heller kidnapping happening that day. It does not take place in real time. All of the episodes were released together as a special for the season 4 DVD boxset.

== Online media ==
=== The Rookie ===
The Rookie, formerly named The Rookie CTU, is a series of online webisodes set at CTU in Los Angeles. It is made by many of the same crew members that make the 24 TV show. The Rookie utilizes the same CTU set as the series, and uses many of the same production elements, such as graphics, editing techniques, and music, giving it an "authentic" look and feel. One exception, however, is that it does not take place in real time. Unilever's Degree Men antiperspirant is a sponsor of The Rookie series.

The stories revolve around rookie CTU agent, Jason Blaine (played by Jeremy Ray Valdez), with appearances by Video Surveillance Manager Angie Lawson and CTU Deputy Director Alton Maxwell. In the first season, "Coffee Run", consisting of three parts, Blaine witnesses a bank robbery in progress during his coffee run. Without a gun, Blaine enters the bank in an attempt to stop the robbery. The second season, "Mistaken Identity", finds Blaine hand-delivering a Blackberry to his boss in his boss' car. He receives a call from Russian terrorists who believe Blaine is his boss. A third season, "Extraction", contains six parts and focuses on Blaine having to rescue Alton Maxwell from a drug smuggler named Esteban Salazar.

=== 24: Day Zero ===
24: Day Zero is a series of online animated webisodes set at CTU in Los Angeles. It is a prequel series, focusing on Jack Bauer's first 18 months at CTU. The series debuted on May 21, 2007, following the airing of the Season 6 finale. As with "The Rookie", Degree Men is a sponsor of the "Day Zero" series.

=== 24: Day 6 Debrief ===
24: Day 6 Debrief is a series of two-minute online webisodes starring Kiefer Sutherland and is set 35 hours after the events of Season 6. Available exclusively to American Express cardholders, the series explains what happened to Jack Bauer in China and set up the events of Season 7. It is in the Season 6 DVD's special features. Like 24: Day Zero, this series also debuted on May 21, 2007 after the airing of the Season 6 finale. American Express is a sponsor of this series and hosted the webisodes on a special page of the Fox website.

== Soundtracks ==
Various soundtracks have been created for the show, and its properties. The most notable is 24: The Soundtrack which contains nineteen tracks of music composed exclusively for the first three seasons by 24's multi-Emmy award winning composer Sean Callery, including the show's full theme song which, prior to the soundtrack's release, had never been aired. A second soundtrack was released 13 November in the UK and 14 November in the US with music from seasons 4 and 5. The soundtrack to 24: Redemption was released on November 24, 2008 as part of the bridge between seasons 6 and 7.

== Books ==
24: The House Special Subcommittee's Findings at CTU written by Marc Cerasini, was a guide to the first season, as written by an in-universe journalist by the same name. The book contained Jack Bauer's grand jury testimony as well as character profiles and autopsy reports.

Titan Books published 24: The Official Companion Seasons 1 & 2 in 2006 in the US and UK. The second volume, 24: The Official Companion Seasons 3 & 4, was released in the UK in February 2007, and released in the US in May 2007. 24: The Official Companion Season 5 was released in November 2007. 24: The Official Companion Guide Season 6 was released with a bonus DVD in January 2008. All the guides are written by Tara DiLullo Bennett. These are quite popular among fans of the show, due to their accuracy and the fact that they are considered 'official' merchandise.

In 2003, an unofficial guide to season 1 of 24 was released, written by Jim Sangster. Later that year, Mark Wright published an unofficial guide to season 2 of 24, and Keith Topping published A Day in the Life: The Unofficial and Unauthorised Guide to 24.

Paperback novels have been published by Harper Entertainment under the title 24: Declassified. They are:

- Operation Hell Gate, written by Marc Cerasini, released September 27, 2005 (ISBN 978-0-06-084224-6)
- Veto Power, by John Whitman, released on October 25, 2005 (ISBN 978-0-06-084225-3)
- Trojan Horse, by Marc Cerasini, released on January 31, 2006 (ISBN 978-0-06-084226-0)
- Cat's Claw, by John Whitman, released on December 26, 2006 (ISBN 978-0-06-084227-7)
- Vanishing Point, by Marc Cerasini, released on February 27, 2007 (ISBN 978-0-06-084228-4)
- Chaos Theory, by John Whitman, released on May 29, 2007 (ISBN 978-0-06-084229-1)
- Storm Force, by David Jacobs, released on December 26, 2007 (ISBN 978-0-06-137884-3)
- Collateral Damage, by Marc Cerasini, released on February 26, 2008 (ISBN 978-0-06-143118-0)
- Trinity, by John Whitman, released on April 29, 2008 (ISBN 978-0-06-143119-7)
- Head Shot, by David Jacobs, released on April 28, 2009 (ISBN 978-0-06177152-1)
- Death Angel, by David Jacobs, released on April 27, 2010 (ISBN 978-0-06-177153-8)
- Deadline, by James Swallow, released on August 5, 2014 (ISBN 978-0-7653-7790-6)
- Rogue, by David Mack, released on September 8, 2015 (ISBN 978-0-7653-7792-0)
- Trial by Fire, by Dayton Ward, released on August 23, 2016 (ISBN 978-0-7653-7794-4)

Other titles include:

- 24: The Ultimate Guide, written by Michael Goldman featuring information about the first six seasons.
- 24: Behind the Scenes, featuring behind the scenes photographs and pictures. The photos were taken by Jon Cassar, 24 Co-Executive Producer/Director. Cassar also wrote the text, as well. A bonus DVD also is included.
- 24: The Counter Terrorist Unit Handbook, featuring a manual of how CTU works and their policies and procedures. It includes pictures from the first six seasons.
- 24 and Philosophy: The World According to Jack, published as part of The Blackwell Philosophy and Pop Culture Series.
- The Tao of Jack Bauer: What Our Favorite Terrorist Buster Says About Life, Love, Torture, and Saving the World 24 Times in 24 Hours With No Lunch Break, a study of Jack Bauer's influence in society.
- Secrets of 24: The Unauthorized Guide to the Political & Moral Issues Behind TV's Most Riveting Drama, which collects interviews and essays to pursue real issues of relevance to our times.
- Jack Bauer for President: Terrorism and Politics in 24, another collection of essays.
- Reading 24: TV against the Clock, a scholarly work of critical discussions of the series from many different perspectives.
- Jack Bauer's Having a Bad Day: An Unauthorized Investigation of Faith in 24: Season 1, which uses each episode to help illustrate a spiritual concept.
- Counterterrorism and Cybersecurity: Total Information Awareness (Second Edition), a scholarly book which examines U.S. counterterrorism history, technologies, and strategies from a thought-provoking approach that includes the make-believe of Hollywood such as 24, Homeland, and The Americans TV series.

== Magazine ==
"24: The Official Magazine" was a bi-monthly Titan Magazines publication that lasted for twelve issues, ceasing publication before the series ended.

== Comics ==
Five graphic novels have been released by IDW Publishing taking place at different time periods within the show. The first, 24: One Shot (July 2004), attempted to emulate the real-time nature of the show. It was followed by 24 Stories (January 2005) and 24: Midnight Sun (July 2005), which did not emulate the real-time nature of the show. These three graphic novels have been compiled in one book simply entitled 24, released by Titan Books. IDW also released a five-issue mini-series entitled 24: Nightfall from November 2006 to March 2007, which was later collected as a trade paperback. A fifth graphic novel published by IDW entitled 24: Cold Warriors was released on March 5, 2008. This 48-page one-shot features Jack Bauer, Chloe O'Brian and others working to stop Russian terrorists in Alaska. Another 24 mini-series called 24: Underground began publication in April 2014 and run for five issues. The events of this book takes place after Season 8 and before Live Another Day. A 5-issue prequel comic of 24: Legacy began publication in April 2017 entitled 24: Legacy - Rules of Engagement.

== Games ==
=== 24: The Game ===
24: The Game is a video game based on the TV series. The game is exclusive to Sony's PlayStation 2 console and was developed by Sony Computer Entertainment's Cambridge Studios, and was published by 2K Games. Taking place between seasons two and three, (6 months after Season 2) 24: The Game features most major actors from those two seasons. This first foray into console gaming also serves to bridge the large gap between the second and third seasons.

=== 24: DVD Board Game ===
There is a tabletop board game published by Pressman Toys, released in August 2006, based on the TV series. Rather than playing characters from the TV series, each player takes on the role of a CTU agent and the accompanying DVD is used to initiate the plot with a terrorist act, then passes threads to the players regarding the full plans of the terrorists, some of which may be useful and others that simply lead nowhere. The winner is the first person to identify and stop a terrorist threat. The DVD also acts as a timer to simulate the "real time" flow of the game. Reviews on websites such as amazon.com indicate that it is almost universally disliked.

=== 24: Mobile ===
There was a 24 game for cell phones released in Feb. 2006 from www.iplay.com It received a score of 6 out of 10 from BBC.

=== 24: Agent Down ===
There was a 2nd game for cell phones released in Nov. 2006 from www.iplay.com

=== 24: Trading Card Game ===
24: Trading Card Game
- Designers: Jason Winter and Trevor McGregor
- Publishers: Press Pass, Inc.
- Players: 2
- Playing time: Approx 20 min.
- Chance: Some
- Age range: 10+
- Skills: Card playing Arithmetic; Basic Reading Ability

24: TCG was a trading card game published by Press Pass, Inc. in which 2 players each play a deck of 24 cards made from characters and events from the television show. Players choose to build their deck as either containing CTU characters or Insurgent characters and play against an opponent, going on missions to attempt to score 24 points. The game had a preview release in August 2007 and released its First Edition in September 2007.

=== Other board games ===
USAOpoly released a variant of the game Clue based on 24. Briarpatch has released two 24 original board games, Countdown and CTU: Undercover.

== 24 toys ==
- Hasbro GI Joe
  - 2008 - CTU Special Agent Jack Bauer - A Real American Hero
- Diamond Select Toys – released 1/6 scale figures based on Jack Bauer
  - 2008 – Jack Bauer 8:00 AM
  - 2009 – Jack Bauer 3:00 PM (Season 1)
  - 2009 – Jack Bauer 9:00 PM (Season 1)
- Diamond Select Toys – released 1/24 scale Minimates based on 24
  - 2007 – Season 1 Box Set (Jack Bauer, Nina Myers, David Palmer, Kim Bauer)
  - 2007 – End of Day 1 Two-Pack, PX Exclusive (Jack Bauer, Andre Drazen)
  - 2007 – Season 2 Box Set (Season 2: Jack Bauer, Tony Almeda, Michelle Dessler, George Mason)
  - 2007 – End of Day 2 Two-Pack, Suncoast/FYE Exclusive (Stretcher Jack Bauer, Prisoner Nina Myers)
  - Cancelled – Season 3 Box Set (Undercover Jack Bauer, Sherry Palmer, Chloe O'Brien, Chase Edmunds)
  - Cancelled – End of Day 3 Two-Pack (Jack Bauer, Stephen Saunders)
- Enterbay – released 1/6 scale figures based on 24
  - 2009 – Jack Bauer
  - 2009 – President David Palmer
- McFarlane Toys – released 1/12 scale figures based on Jack Bauer
  - 2007 – Jack Bauer Boxed Set 1
  - 2007 – Jack Bauer Boxed Set 2
- Medicom Toy Japan – released 1/6 scale figures based on Jack Bauer in their Real Action Heroes line
  - 2005 – Jack Bauer (Suit) 7:00 AM – 8:00 AM (Season 4)
  - 2005 – Jack Bauer (Tac) 11:00 AM – 12:00 PM (Season 4)
  - 2007 – Jack Bauer (Season 5)

== Attraction ==
On August 4, 2007, a 24-themed Interactive game attraction was opened in Tokyo, Japan in the famous indoor amusement park Tokyo Joypolis. The attraction is titled "24 CTU: The Mission". The game attraction features no 24 characters but focuses on the CTU aspect of the series. Guests are agents-in-training at CTU: Tokyo division. Agents are sent on a simulated mission to find a device which terrorists planted inside the Park, set to go off within 24 hours. Guests collect clues from around the park, then use the clues to solve a number of problems; problems that need to be solved include determining the location of the device and the identity of the terrorist. Guests who pass the mission test receive a special CTU agent sticker in return.

== Parodies ==
24's popularity also led the series' format to be parodied in more than one occasion, prominently in The Simpsons season 18 episode "24 Minutes", and in South Park season 11 episode "The Snuke". Also, the series is referred to in the American Dad! season 1 episode "Threat Levels": when the Smith house is quarantined after it is thought to be infected by a virus, Stan suggests to watch the entire first season of 24. Fellow Fox-aired series House M.D. has been known to refer to 24 mockingly.

The clock and split-screen style in 24 has been parodied in the anime Lucky Star; in episode 17, Sojiro (Konata's father), Yui, and Yutaka are making a birthday party for Konata, and subsequent scenes mimic this style. The clock/split-screen style was also in the 100th episode of Keroro Gunsō.

CollegeHumor created a parody of 24 known as 24: The Unaired 1994 Pilot. In the short film, Jack Bauer dons a long scruffy hairdo and has to go back and forth to use a telephone booth (due to lack of wireless technology) to call CTU for objectives, as he tries to stop a bomb.

Late Night with Conan O'Brien had a 24 spoof segment called 60, where instead of 24's 1 hour episodes, episodes of 60 only lasted one second of a one-minute season. It would take numerous episodes to show a cell phone conversation, including one episode just showing the main character closing his phone.

The 2010 Albuquerque 48 Hour Film Project featured a short parody of 24 called Jane Backer: Dental Billing Assistant—complete with a female Jack Bauer who tortures an uncooperative dental patient. The film won multiple awards.

In "The Job", an episode of The Office, Dwight Schrute says when asked to pick his assistant, "My ideal choice? Jack Bauer. But he is unavailable, fictional, and overqualified."

During an episode of My Name Is Earl, Earl and Randy are strapped to a ticking bomb. Not only do the ticks sound extremely similar to the ticking of the clock in 24, but the scene eventually becomes splitscreen, with each tick adding a subsequent image to the screen, exactly like 24.

The series is parodied in Grand Theft Auto IV as 72, where the series' main character targets "every person of color" before they carry out terrorist attacks by staying up for three days straight.

On MADtv, there are recurring sketches called "24 with Bobby Lee" featuring Lee and a guest on the show. Every sketch begins with Bobby sleeping in his underwear in a certain position. The sketches incorporate the opening with the yellow digital "24" symbol appearing in front of a black background, the yellow text describing when the following scene takes place over the black background accompanied by a voice-over reciting the text, and the usage of the show's background music.

On the 2009 version of The Electric Company, there are recurring sketches called ":24" featuring a blue dog named "Jack Bowser" who speaks in the same deep voice as Jack Bauer.

The Canadian television series Corner Gas season 5 episode "Final Countdown" parodies the clock in one instance. Kiefer Sutherland has a cameo in that episode.

The split-screen effect from the show was used in Simple Plan's music video for "Don't Wanna Think About You", featured on the Scooby-Doo 2: Monsters Unleashed soundtrack.

In the RPG Persona 5 Royal, the main character can rent DVDs to watch in their room to boost their social stats. Later in the game, one of the DVDs the player can rent is a DVD called "31", whose name is a play on 24. When the player uses their spare time to watch the DVD, they gain 2 ranks of Guts, or 3 if they read the book The Craft of Cinema.

== Soft drink ==
In late-2007, stores in the UK started selling an energy drink using the 24 insignia and branding. The drink is produced in regular and diet versions.
