= Card binder =

Device used to protect trading cards

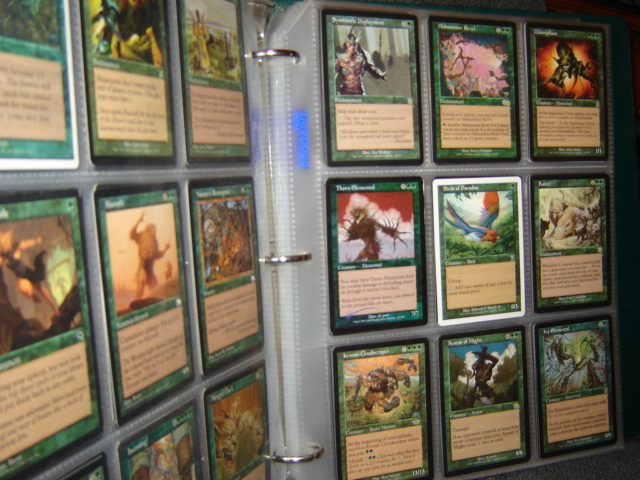
Binder filled with Magic: The Gathering cards using 9-pocket card pages in a 3-ring binder.

Card binders and 9-pocket pages are devices used to protect trading cards or game cards (such as collectible card games) from damage and to store them. Card binders typically use a ring mechanism with round rings, D-ring, or slant D-rings.

== 9-pocket page ==
A 9-pocket page, also called a 9-card page or a 9-card sleeve, is a 3x3 plastic page that holds 3 cards per row and per column. Other variations of this type of card pocket page exists. Additionally, some collectors prefer not to put more than one card in a pocket, as opposed to putting all duplicates in the same pocket (called a "double up"), or putting cards in backwards to be displayed on the reverse side of the page.

== See also ==
- Card sleeve
- Singles, individual collectible cards
