= Echte Wagner =

German margarine brand

Echte Wagner Margarine
- Industry: Margarine
- Founded: 1907
- Founder: Carl Wagner
- Defunct: 1976; 50 years ago
- Headquarters: Elmshorn, Holstein, Germany

Echte Wagner (German for 'Genuine Wagner') was a German brand of margarine, produced by the Wagner company in Elmshorn, Holstein, in the 20th century. The business was opened by Carl Wagner in 1907 and finally closed in 1976. It was known for offering collectible cards and in the 1950s also marbles and plastic figures with purchases. In 1930 it created the series known as Zukunftsfantasien (Imaginings of the Future), which offered glimpses of a future world, including concepts such as personal wireless communication devices and novel modes of transport.

== Company ==
Holsteinische Pflanzenbutterfabriken Wagner & Co., G.m.b.H. ('Holstein Margarine Factories Wagner & Company') produced margarine in Elmshorn, Holstein, Germany, using the Echte Wagner brand. The first factory was opened in 1907 at Königstraße 1, Elmshorn, in what is now the town's main shopping street, by Carl Wagner, a ham and sausage wholesaler. The town was chosen for its transport links. In 1913 a larger factory was opened at Gärtnerstraße 10. In 1925, a branch factory was opened in Dommitzsch in the Province of Saxony, but was lost to the company after to the division of Germany in 1945. The company started issuing collectible cards in 1928 and in the 1950s also offered marbles and plastic figures. The main factory was destroyed in World War II, then rebuilt by the founder's son, Heinrich Wagner. In 1960 it had about 250 employees and produced around 15.000 tonnes of margarine each year. In 1976, the company merged with Margarine-Voss from Hamburg and Bavarian Margarine Works from Munich to form "Elite Margarine und Feinkost GmbH" and production moved to Hamburg, but the merged company failed two years later.

== Background ==
In the late 19th century collectible cards were distributed with relatively expensive products such as cocoa. After World War I they were also distributed with cigarettes and margarine. At that time, there was a significant audience in Germany for Zukunftsroman and futuristic novels. The advertising imagery during the Weimar era mirrors a profound excitement for technology and a hopeful view of advancement.

== Future Fantasies (Zukunftsfantasien) ==
Envisioned communication from the album Zukunftsfantasien, Echte Wagner Album No. 3, series 12 and 13, 1930

In 1930, Echte Wagner Margarine introduced a line of card sets labeled 'Zukunftsfantasien' (Imaginings of the Future); the artist or artists involved were not credited. The cards were meant to be collected in an album. The cards were numbered as Echte Wagner Margarine Album Nr. 3, Serien 12 und 13 (Genuine Wagner Margarine Album No. 3, Series 12 and 13). The cards present a vision of the future from a 1930 perspective and include concepts such as a wireless personal phone, novel modes of transportation, the cosmos, and numerous other subjects.

Among the illustrations are:

1. Phones with monitors similar to present-day video calling devices.
2. An ocean-based artificial landing pad to serve as an intermediate stop for transatlantic air travel.
3. A monorail.

== See also ==
- Utopia (German science fiction)
- Collectable
- Brooke Bond Cards
