= Panini Group =

Italian publishing house

Panini S.p.A.
- Type: Società per azioni
- Industry: Collectibles, digital media, distribution, licensing and publishing
- Founded: 1961; 65 years ago
- Founder: Giuseppe Panini
- Headquarters: Modena, Italy
- Area served: Worldwide
- Products: Books, comic books, magazines, stickers, trading cards and trading card games
- Revenue: €2.02 billion (2025)
- Owner: Panini Management and Fineldo
- Number of employees: 1,000+ (2024)
- Divisions: Collectibles; Publishing/Comics; Panini Digital; The Licensing Machine
- Subsidiaries: Panini America, Inc.
- Website: paninigroup.com

Panini S.p.A. is an Italian company that produces books, comics, magazines, stickers, trading cards and other items through its collectibles and publishing subsidiaries. It is headquartered in Modena and named after the Panini brothers, who founded it in 1961. Panini distributes its own products and products of third party providers. Panini maintains a Licensing Division to buy and resell licences and provide agency for individuals and newspapers seeking to purchase rights and comic licences. Through Panini Digital, the company uses voice-activated software to capture football statistics, which is then sold to agents, teams, media outlets and video game manufactures.

New Media operates Panini's online applications and generates income through content and data sales. Forming a partnership with FIFA in 1970, Panini published its first FIFA World Cup sticker album for the 1970 World Cup. Since then, collecting and trading stickers and cards has become part of the World Cup experience, especially for the younger generation. In 2017, a 1970 World Cup Panini sticker album signed by Pelé sold for a record £10,450.

== History ==
The Panini brothers at the Modena factory in 1960, fltr: Giuseppe, Umberto, Franco, and Benito

Benito and Giuseppe Panini were operating a newspaper distribution office in Modena, Italy in 1960, when they found a collection of figurines (stickers attached with glue) that a Milan company was unable to sell. The brothers bought the collection and sold them in packets of two for ten lire each. They sold three million packets. Having had success with the figurines, Giuseppe founded Panini in 1961 to manufacture and sell his own figurines. Benito joined Panini the same year. Panini sold 15 million packets of figurines in 1961. The following year, 29 million units were sold, and brothers Franco and Umberto Panini joined the company in 1963. Umberto Panini died on November 29, 2013, at the age of 83. In 1966, Giuseppe founded a professional volleyball club that would later become known as Modena Volley.

The company became well known in the 1960s for its football collections, which soon became popular with children. Rare stickers (figurine) can reach very high prices on the collectors' market. Some popular games were invented which used stickers as playing cards.

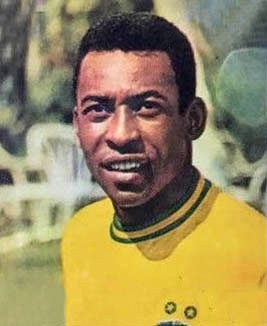
Pelé trading card from the Mexico 70 series, Panini's first FIFA World Cup collection

In 1970, Panini began publishing L'Almanacco Illustrato del Calcio Italiano (The Illustrated Guide to Italian Football), after purchasing the rights from publishing house Carcano. Panini also published its first FIFA World Cup trading cards and sticker album for the 1970 World Cup in Mexico, in addition to using multilingual captions and selling stickers outside of Italy for the first time. Initiating a craze for collecting and trading stickers, Panini's stickers were an instant hit, with The Guardian stating in the United Kingdom, “the tradition of swapping duplicate [World Cup] stickers was a playground fixture during the 1970s and 1980s.” Another first for Panini, in the early 1970s, it began introducing self-adhesive stickers as opposed to using glue.

In 1986, Panini created a museum of figurines, which they donated to the city of Modena in 1992. Panini begins assembling each World Cup squad for their sticker album a few months before they are officially announced by each nation, which means surprise call-ups often do not feature in their album. A notable example of this was 17-year-old Brazilian striker Ronaldo, who was called up for the Brazil squad for the 1994 FIFA World Cup.

The Panini family sold the company to Robert Maxwell's publishing group in 1988. After Maxwell's business went under, a group of companies led by Bain Cuneo Capital Investments bought Panini in 1992. Then Marvel Entertainment bought the company in 1994. In 1999, Fineldo and Panini's top execs bought the business, putting it back under Italian ownership.

In May 2006, Panini partnered with The Coca-Cola Company and Tokenzone to produce the first virtual sticker album for the 2006 FIFA World Cup. The album was viewable in at least 10 different languages, such as Portuguese, Dutch, English, French, German, Greek, Italian, Japanese, Korean and Spanish. For the 2014 World Cup, three million FIFA.com users took part in the Panini Digital Sticker Album contest. Panini developed an app for the 2018 World Cup, where fans could collect and swap virtual stickers. Five million people gathered digital stickers for the 2018 World Cup.

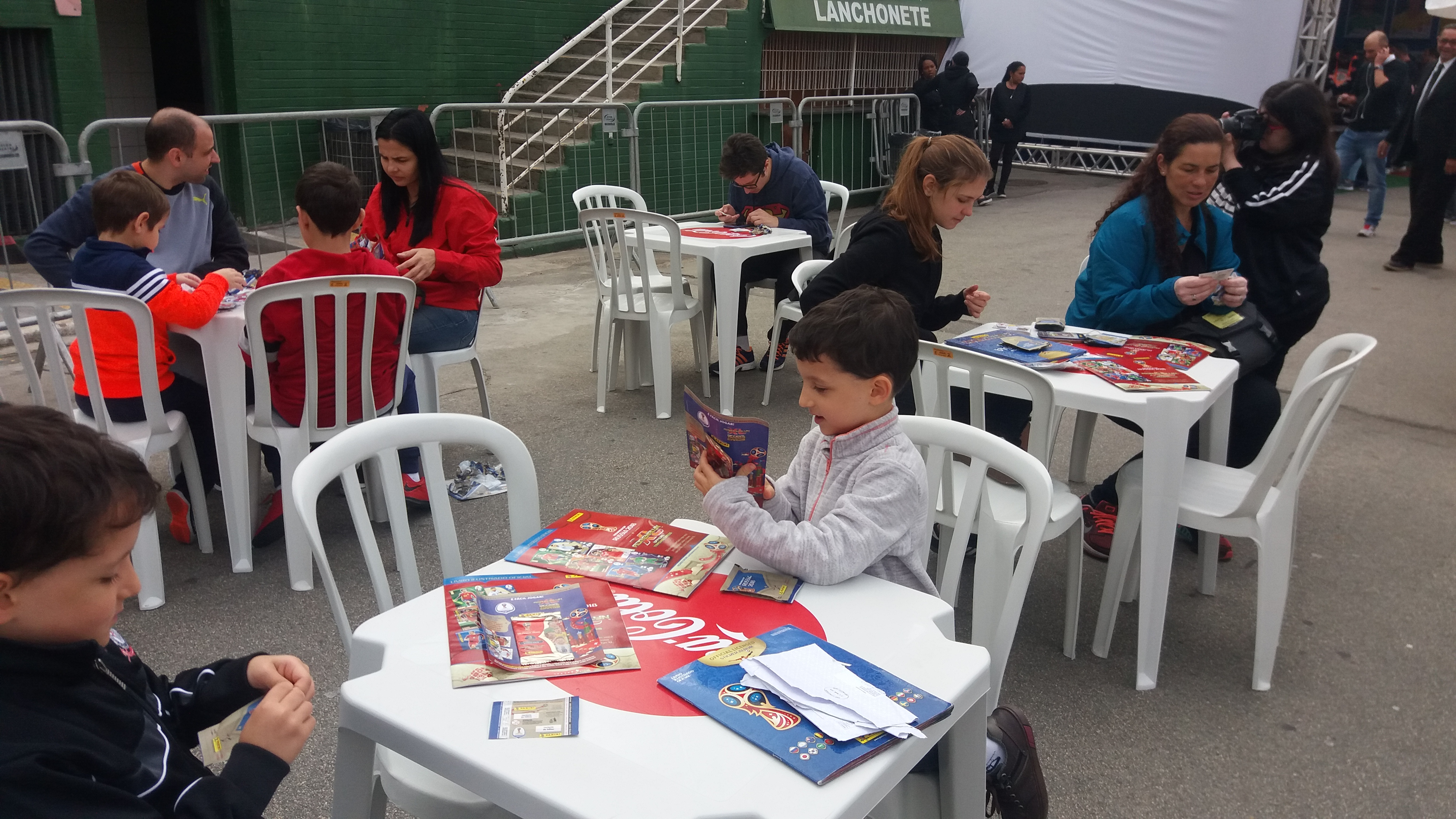
Sticker trade in Brazil for Panini's 2018 World Cup sticker album

The classic football stickers today are complemented by the collectible card game Adrenalyn XL, introduced in 2009. In 2010, Panini released a UEFA Champions League edition of Adrenalyn XL, containing 350 cards from 22 of the competing clubs, including defending champions FC Barcelona. Beginning in 2015, Topps signed a deal to produce stickers, trading cards and digital collections for the competition. The fourth edition of Panini FIFA 365 Adrenalyn XL was released for 2019, featuring top clubs, teams and players.

In January 2009, Panini acquired an exclusive licence to produce NBA trading cards and stickers, effective for the 2009–10 NBA season. On March 13, 2009, Panini acquired the U.S. trading card manufacturer Donruss Playoff LP. With it, Panini inherited Donruss' NFL and NFLPA licences.

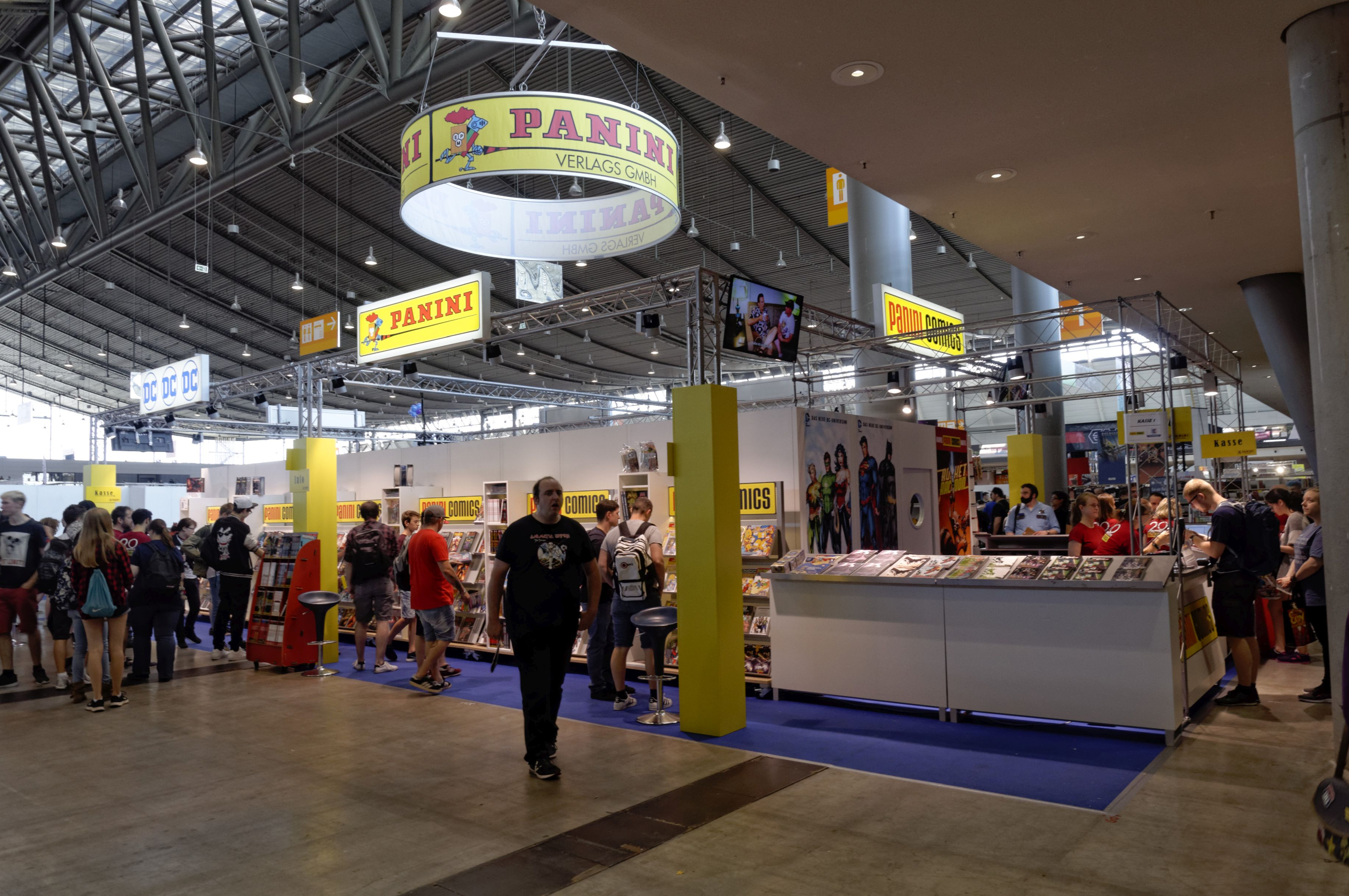
Panini at the Comic Con Germany 2018

In March 2010, Panini acquired a licence from the NHL and NHLPA. The 2010–11 ice hockey season was the first in five years that had more than one company creating cards, with Upper Deck producing their own NHL cards. In July 2010, Panini acquired a licence to create an official sticker collection for the Olympic and Paralympic Games in London 2012.

In 2013, Panini acquired Disney’s Italian periodicals publishing business, which included the publication of Topolino.

In 2014, Panini made cards for that year's FIFA World Cup, and did the same for the 2018 edition, albeit with price hikes for packets across the world. Dubbed the “Panini Cheapskates” in 2018, a couple from Oxford won fans all over the world on social media by filling in their 2018 World Cup sticker album by drawing in each player.

During the 2018 World Cup, Panini produced an average of 8 to 10 million card packages per day. In 2018, Panini signed a deal with the English Premier League to produce cards under licence for the 2019–20 season. The agreement expired after the 2024-25 season, with Fanatics-owned Topps taking over in June 2025.

Some of Panini's releases in 2019 included collections of movies Avengers: Endgame and Toy Story 4, and the 2019 FIFA Women's World Cup.

Panini's license with the Major League Baseball Players Association expired at the end of 2022, which meant they could no longer produce baseball cards of players covered by the Players Association union contract. Panini has continued to make baseball cards since their license with the MLBPA expired, with the ability to only feature individuals not covered by the Players Association (typically retired/deceased players, or minor league players). These have been called "pajama cards" by collectors, as the player uniforms have been edited to remove team logos and trademarks of Major League Baseball, giving the appearance of athletes wearing pajamas.

In October 2023, Panini became the Official Trading Card partner of EuroLeague.

In May 2025, Panini became the Official Trading Card partner of all three divisions (as well as the EFL Cup and EFL Trophy) of the English Football League starting for the 2025–26 Season.

In March 2026, it was announced that the NWSL and the NWSLPA had entered a multi-year partnership with Panini to produce trading cards, digital collectibles on Panini’s blockchain and an official sticker collection.

In May 2026, it was revealed that global sports platform Fanatics, Inc. had signed an exclusive collective licensing deal with FIFA to become the exclusive licensor of collectible cards, stickers, and card games for the World Cup and other FIFA events. The agreement will be effective from 2031 onward. The deal cut the long-term partnership between FIFA and Panini, which had been the licensee for over five decades.

== Panini America ==
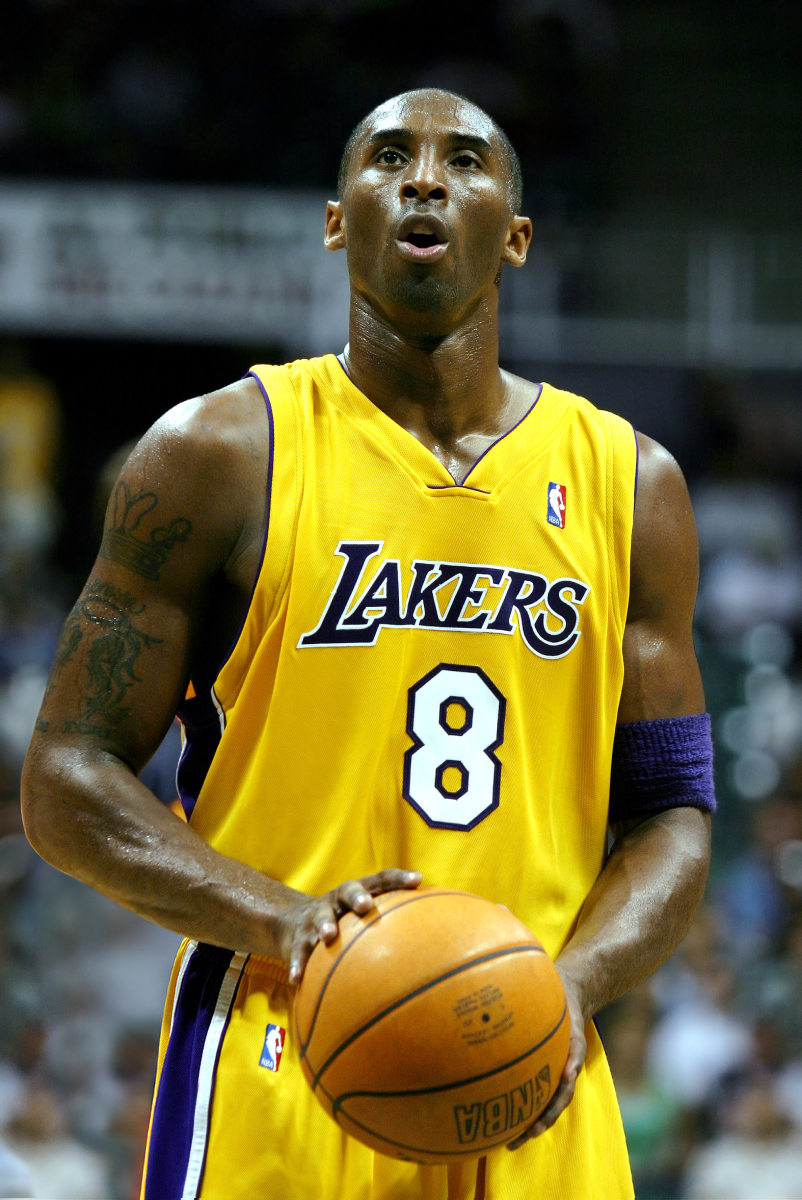
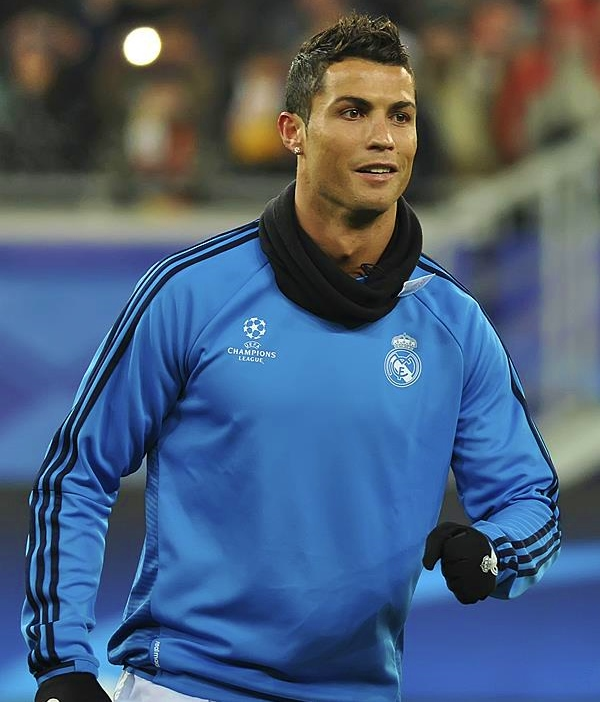
Superstars Kobe Bryant (left) and Cristiano Ronaldo signed exclusive deals with Panini in 2009 and 2015, respectively.

In January 2009, the National Basketball Association (NBA) announced Panini would become the exclusive trading card partner of the league beginning with the 2009–10 season. In March of that year, the Panini Group purchased assets of the industry's second-oldest trading-card company, Donruss, and formed the new subsidiary, "Panini America". The company continued to operate out of Irving, Texas, with much of the existing upper management.

Panini signed an exclusive agreement with five-time NBA champion Kobe Bryant of the Los Angeles Lakers as its official company spokesman and global trading card ambassador in 2009. Bryant's special affiliation to Panini goes back to his time growing up in Italy, where he collected Italian football stickers. In March 2010, the National Hockey League Players' Association (NHLPA) and National Hockey League (NHL) granted Panini Group a multi-year trading card licence, marking the third major sports licence Panini Group had secured since establishing a presence in the U.S. in 2009.

According to the Panini Group, the 2010 FIFA World Cup sticker album sold 10 million packs in the U.S. alone. In 2016, Panini America paid Cristiano Ronaldo $170,000 for signing 1,000 Panini stickers, while Neymar received $50,000 for signing 600.

This subsidiary holds official licences for the NBA, NFL, NASCAR, WWE, FIFA, The Collegiate Licensing Company (CLC), Disney, DreamWorks, and Warner Bros. Panini also has exclusive partnerships with Pop Warner Little Scholars, Inc., the Naismith Memorial Basketball Hall of Fame, and the Pro Football Hall of Fame.

In January 2021, Panini America signed an exclusive multi-year trading card deal with the Ultimate Fighting Championship (UFC). In August 2021, Panini America also partnered with the UFC to release NFTs, commemorating big fights, milestones and moments. In June 2025, Panini America was announced as the title sponsor of the Senior Bowl, a post-season college football all-star game played annually in late January or early February in Mobile, Alabama.

In October 2025, Konami Cross Media NY announced that it has signed publishing deals with Random House Children's Books and Panini Group for the Yu-Gi-Oh! franchise.

In November 2025, Panini and the WNBA players' association agreed to a new licensing deal, which would be the largest licensing deal on record for a women's sports rightsholder. Also in November, Panini America was sued by rival trading card maker Wild Card, who alleged that Panini had violated U.S. and Texas antitrust law by threatening Wild Card's distribution partners, thereby "reducing output, suppressing innovation, and preserving Panini’s dominant market power".

== Licensed products ==
Panini produced stickers and trading cards for the UEFA competitions until 2022, when it was replaced by Topps As of 2026, Panini had licence rights of football international competitions such as the FIFA World Cup and Conmebol competitions such as Copa América and Copa Libertadores (since 2023).

Domestic leagues' licenses include the EFL (EFL Championship, EFL League One, and EFL League Two) from the 2025–26 season, Spanish La Liga, Italian Serie A, Hrvatska Nogometna Liga, and Argentine Liga Profesional among others.

== Legal issues ==
In August 2023, Panini America filed an antitrust lawsuit against Fanatics, a sports platform, alleging that the company engaged in anticompetitive conduct in the sports trading card market. Fanatics denied the allegations and filed a countersuit, also in August 2023, asserting that its licensing agreements were lawfully negotiated and that Panini had engaged in improper business practices during related negotiations. Litigation between the two companies remains ongoing.

In November 2025, Tennessee-based trading card company Wild Card filed an antitrust lawsuit against Panini America in the U.S. District Court for the Eastern District of Texas, alleging that Panini used anticompetitive conduct to push Wild Card out of the market and blocked its access to distribution and production channels. The complaint claims that in 2021, Panini warned distributors that carrying Wild Card products would have “consequences,” causing several to withdraw support. It further claims that Panini hired Citibank to explore a potential sale of the company, while simultaneously asserting that Fanatics’ acquisition of Topps would make it harder for Panini to remain profitable. Wild Card is seeking injunctive relief and neutral allocation policies.

== Panini family philanthropy ==
Giuseppe Panini, the eldest brother and the founder of the business, and a collector himself, financed the creation of the Raccolte Fotografiche Modenesi (Modena's photographic collections), an archive of more than 300,000 photographs and a similar number of postcards, describing the life of the city and the evolution of photographic art.

== See also ==
- Almanacco Illustrato del Calcio
- Association football trading card
