= Card sleeve =

Plastic sleeves for playing cards

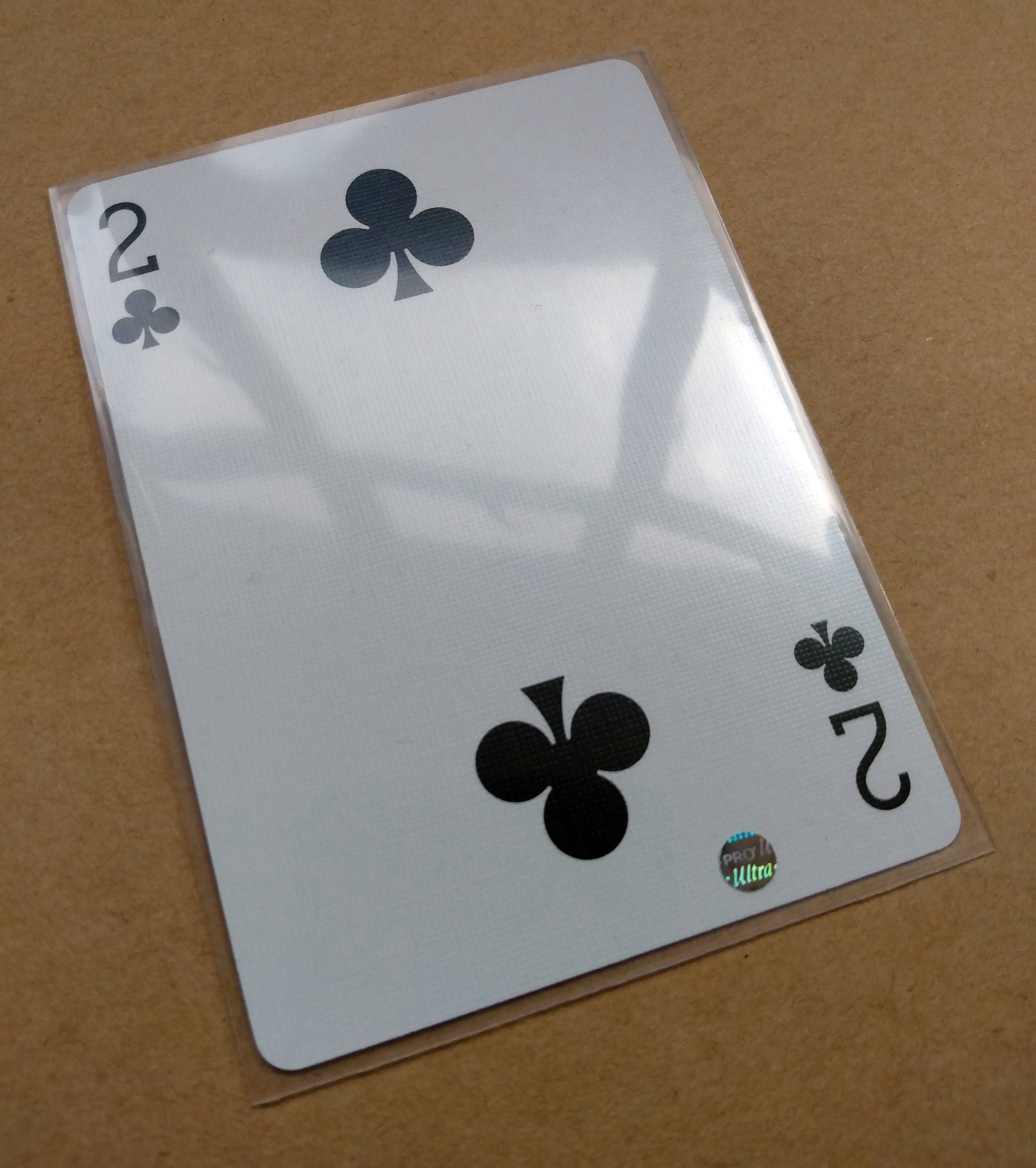
A playing card in a transparent plastic Ultra Pro card sleeve

Plastic card sleeves are used to protect trading cards, game cards, and collectible card game cards from wear and tear. The sleeves are a sheath of plastic into which a card is inserted.

== Varieties ==
A wide variety of protective devices have been developed following the introduction of collectible card games, including the bulky "top-loader", a rigid plastic case with one open end (essentially a box for a single card) and the less-expensive simple "card sleeve", a card-sized envelope of clear plastic, with one end open.

== Development ==
Once collectible card games became popular after the advent of Magic: The Gathering, new technology was needed for two reasons. First, existing devices were not made with shuffling in mind: rigid top-loaders are effectively impossible to shuffle, and traditional card sleeves would tear easily during shuffling. Card sleeves also became more important because of Magic tournaments: cards that were worn were considered to be marked, and could not be used in tournament decks. The card sleeves were also a potential marking device: one drawback of traditional card sleeves was that they were typically slightly nonuniform, and therefore a potential way of marking cards in a deck on their own.

== History ==
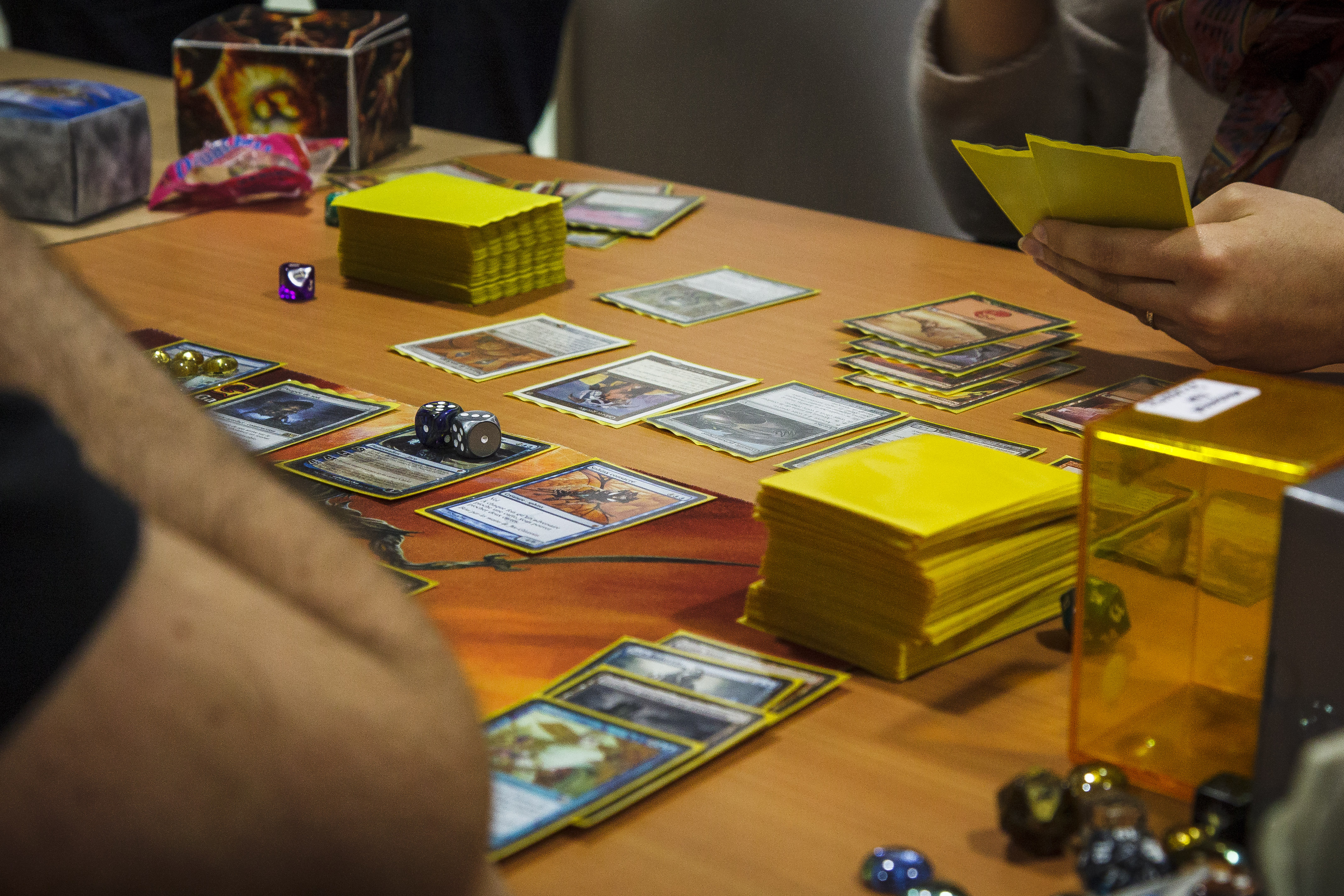
Players with yellow sleeved Magic: the Gathering cards

In 1995, the Ultra Pro company released the first card sleeves designed specifically for collectible card games, which they called deck protectors. Deck protectors were a tougher and more uniform version of traditional card sleeves, made of polypropylene, and specifically designed to snugly fit traditional cards. The first deck protectors were clear, but soon after, deck protectors were offered with opaque black backs, which would obscure the actual back of the card, allowing worn cards to be used without "marking" the deck. Other colors soon followed, and now a wide variety of deck protectors are available in many colors, and even with images on the back. These early sleeves would have the quality control problem of all the sleeves in the packet not being all evenly cut. Despite other companies like KMC and Player's Choice bringing this issue under control, it is still a common problem with many card sleeve manufacturers.

Today, players can get card sleeves specifically designed for other trading card games like Yu-Gi-Oh!. The increasing popularity of card games has resulted in the entry of competitors in the protective sleeve market, including companies such as Players' Choice, Dragon Shield, and TitanShield.

With the increasing popularity of board games with game card components such as Settlers of Catan, Ticket to Ride and Dominion, Mayday Games launched card sleeves specifically for board games in 2008. These card sleeves are now offered in six sizes and two thicknesses for over 500 board games. In 2009 Fantasy Flight Games also entered the board-game card sleeve market with a line of premium thickness sleeves of its own. Today, sleeves in varying sizes are offered by many companies.

== In tournament ==
Modern tournament rules for most trading card games allow (or even mandate) the use of card sleeves, and consider the card sleeves (if opaque) to be the real "back" of the card for the purposes of marking. This is also mandated to help players, judges, and tournament organizers to distinguish between player's decks and cards.

== See also ==
- Card binder
- Singles, individual collectible cards
