= Ace Authentic =

American company

- Headquarters: Duluth, Georgia
- Products: trading cards, memorabilia
- Website: www.aceauthentic.com

Ace Authentic, formerly based in Duluth, Georgia, manufactured tennis trading cards and memorabilia, and sold other items such as photographs and posters. They partnered with more than 350 tennis players and legends to provide items, such as autographs and game worn material, not found through other dealers.

Ace Authentic entered the trading card market in 2005.

In December 2012, Leaf Trading Cards purchased the tennis trading card business and assets from Ace Authentic. This acquisition made Leaf the primary maker of licensed tennis trading cards, leading to the release of the final branded set, 2013 Leaf Ace Authentic Grand Slam Tennis.

== Trading card products ==
Year	Set	Set Type	Cards	Size	Ref
2005	Debut Edition	Main	98	2½" x 3½"	
2005	Sharapova SE	Main	50	2½" x 3½"	
2005	Signature Series	Main	100	2½" x 3½"	
2006	Grand Slam	Main	36	2½" x 3½"	
2006	Heroes & Legends	Main	99	2½" x 3½"	
2007	All England Championships Autographs	Main	4	2½" x 3½"	
2007	All England Championships Materials	Main	4	2½" x 3½"	
2007	French Championships Autographs	Main	4	2½" x 3½"	
2007	Straight Sets	Main	50	2½" x 3½"	
2007	The Tennis Reserve	Main	3 / 4 (?), 1	2½" x 3½" / 8x10" (?), 2.7" x 2.7"	
2008	Grand Slam Stars Autographs Bronze	Main	20	2½" x 3½"	
2008	Grand Slam 2	Main	32	2½" x 3½"	
2008	Match Point	Main	75	2½" x 3½"	
2009	Hidden Signatures (Series 1)	Main	1	2.7" x 2.7"	
2009	Secret Tennis Signatures (Series 1)	Main	1	8" x 10"	
2009	Game, Set, Match	Main	4, 1	2½" x 3½", 2.7" x 2.7"	
2010	Hidden Signatures (Series 2)	Main	1	2.7" x 2.7"	
2010	Hidden Signatures (Series 3)	Main	1	2.7" x 2.7"	
2010	Secret Tennis Signatures (Series 2)	Main	1	8" x 10"	
2010	Aces	Main	8	2½" x 3½"	
2011	Roger Federer Grand Slam Box Set	Main	33	2½" x 3½"	
2011	Match Point 2	Main	120	2½" x 3½"	
2011	EX	Main	6	2½" x 3½"	
2011	Hidden Signature (Series 4)	Main	29	2½" x 3½"	
2012	Secret Signatures (Series 3)	Main	1	8" x 10"	
2012	Grand Slam 3	Main	18	2½" x 3½"	
2013	Signature Series	Main	6	2½" x 3½"	
2013	Grand Slam	Main	10	2½" x 3½"	
