= Almanacco Illustrato del Calcio =

Annual football publication in Italy

Football Illustrated Almanac
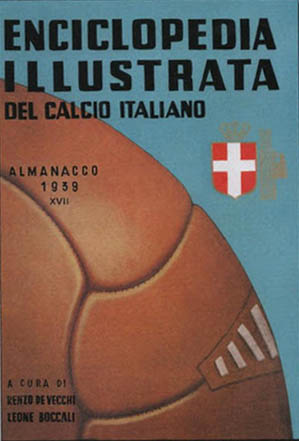
- Cover of the first edition, 1939
- Author: Various journalists
- Original title: Almanacco Illustrato del Calcio
- Country: Italy
- Language: Italian
- Discipline: Association football
- Publisher: Panini Group (1971–present)
- Published: 1939–present
- Media type: Print
- Website: Panini Italy

The Almanacco Illustrato del Calcio (English: Football Illustrated Almanac) is an annual publication concerning football in Italy, from the first division (Serie A) to lower leagues that compose the league system in the country.

The Almanacco revisites the football activities within the year, including statistics, results, and curiosities. Currently edited by Panini, the annual has been published since 1939.

== History ==
The first Italian football almanacs were launched in 1913 and 1938, under different names. In 1939 the book took its current form, under the name Enciclopedia Illustrata del Calcio Italiano. The reported statistics and information of the 1937–38 season (in Italy and worldwide, for example third World Cup) have, in addition, colour spots.

Publishing has always been annual, except during World War II, but the 1947 edition covered those seasons, as well as other seasons. Panini started publishing in 1971.

== Content ==
The Almanacco combines numbers, photos and information about previous and current seasons. The usual chapters are as follows:

- Intro and focus
- Personal information about players, coaches and referees (Note: Information contains personal (height, weight, date and place of birth) and sport infos (matches, goals and careers).)
- Index of professional clubs (Note: Clubs participating in Serie A, Serie B and Lega Pro with infos about their squad (official and youth) and histories.)
- Summary of previous year (Note: Results, statistics, tables and scores of: Serie A, Serie B, Lega Pro, Serie D, Coppa Italia and youth competitions.)
- Plan for current year (Note: List of teams, calendars and other tables.)
- Resumes of domestic derbies (Note: Only derbies of Milan, Rome, Genoa, Turin and Verona are included.)
- Championship history (Note: List of champions, regulamentations and records: promotions, relegations, goals scored and conceded, top scorers, recordmen (appearances and goals), penalty scorers (with at least 5 penalties scored).)
- Worldwide football (Note: Matches and statistics of Italian and other national teams; results of European and other continental competitions.)

Some editions also contains specials about tournaments (FIFA World Cup, UEFA Euro, Confederations Cup), biographies of players and clubs (e.g. on the anniversary of foundation, or when they go bankrupt). The book is published in autumn, and it is updated to November.

== Format changes ==
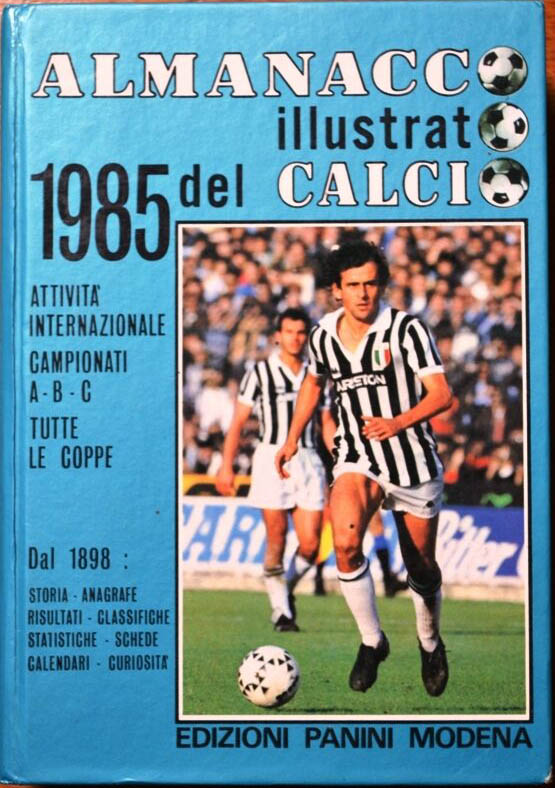
The 1985 edition, depicting Juventus player Michel Platini

Until 2002, the Almanacco, which was printed in black and white covered history of Italian championships (before and after 1929 split - known as "girone unico" - with results, tables and champion squads) and the list of Italian national games (from 1910). The principal format changes are listed below:

- In 2003 photos get colour, players of Series A and B have appearances and goals in their league recorded (for their team and overall), and the * that previously noted the home team is erased. A special first appearance, related to 2002 World Cup (with statistics of 32 participating national teams) is included.
- In 2004 the section about the UEFA Champions League was expanded, with a list of finals (played until that season) and some photos. Serie A pages, after a day-by-day account, have an album added. (Note: The album was only present in the 2004 and 2005 editions (with 3 and 5 pages, respectively).)
- The 2005 edition is the longest ever printed, with 944 pages. This was due to a 2003 scandal (in which Catania was mainly involved) that led to 2003–04 Serie B being played with 24 teams: Panini chose to report prior information (see the top of the section) in addition to 2003–04 season information and a special based on UEFA Euro 2004. In order to make chapters easier to find, every chapter has a different colour.
- The 2006 edition removed old statistics, and established a new pattern for Serie A photos: each day of Serie A is printed in 2 pages, with illustrations. National team games are also covered, using a table format rather than text one.

Later editions also have brought news, such as lists of record-holders for Serie A clubs and focus.

== Non-canonical editions ==
Catania's 2003 scandal meant for the next season, Serie B was expanded from 20 to 24 teams. The Almanacco printed in late 2004 (with 2005 on its cover) was, as result, longer than previous editions. Panini therefore decided, starting with the following edition, to produce a shorter book. Statistics replied until that moment were cut, to being published in a special publication (Almanacco: La Storia 1898-2004) not counted as canonical. It was published in September 2005, months before the regular publication.

== See also ==
- Panini Group
- Association football trading card
- Sports memorabilia
