= Press Pass, Inc. =

American company

- Industry: lithographic commercial printing, collectibles, sports die-cast
- Founded: Mooresville, NC, United States (1992)
- Headquarters: Huntersville, NC, United States
- Area served: Worldwide
- Products: trading cards, sports die-cast
- Number of employees: 4
- Website: www.presspassinc.com

Press Pass, Inc. is a trading card and licensed sports die-cast company that was founded in 1992. Press Pass was the first company to insert a game used jersey into basketball cards, and inserted a race-used tire into their NASCAR trading cards in 1996.
