= Tokenzone =

American Virtual Property technology company

Tokenzone, Inc.
- Company type: Private company
- Industry: Digital asset
- Founded: 2000; 26 years ago in New York City, New York
- Founders: Arias Brothers (Isaac, Ricardo and Eduardo)
- Headquarters: White Plains, NY, United States
- Area served: Worldwide
- Key people: Ricardo Arias-Nath (Chairman and CEO); Isaac Arias (President and CTO)
- Products: Non-fungible tokens, collectables, virtual trading cards, virtual currency
- Website: www.tokenzone.com See Archived December 24, 2003, at the Wayback Machine

Tokenzone was an American company primarily known for inventing the concept of non-fungible tokens used primarily as digital collectibles on the Internet prior to the invention of blockchain based NFTs. Tokenzone was founded on January 21, 2000, by the Arias Brothers (Isaac, Ricardo and Eduardo).

== History ==
In November 2000, Tokenzone founders filed the first patent application with the United States Patent and Trademark Office for a method and apparatus of collecting and trading items provides for receiving collectible items, trading the items with other collectors and interacting with the items.

The items could typically be a digital representative of trading cards including, for example, baseball cards, movie scenes, or in other instances, currencies. Various games could be built around the method including providing that the first player to collect all of the trading cards or token instances will receive a reward. Multiple players could engage in the game using, for example, the Internet.

Tokenzone Technology Infrastructure

Tokenzone pioneered the concept of digital collectibles by developing a technology that centrally managed the creation, distribution and exchange of digital non-fungible tokens. Companies such as The Walt Disney Company, Time Warner, ViacomCBS, Mattel and The Coca-Cola Company were among the earliest adopters.

== See also ==
- Digital collectible card game
- Collectible card game
