= Merlin Publishing =

British football sticker publisher

Merlin Publishing Ltd.
- Industry: Collectibles, distribution, licensing and publishing
- Founded: 1989
- Founder: Kelvyn Gardner, Peter Dunk, Peter Warsop
- Defunct: 1995; 31 years ago
- Fate: Merged into Topps; the "Merlin" name would continue as a trading cards brand
- Successor: Topps UK
- Headquarters: Milton Keynes, United Kingdom
- Area served: United Kingdom, Europe
- Products: Books, comics, magazines, stickers, trading cards, trading card games

Merlin Publishing Limited, commonly known as Merlin and sometimes branded as Merlin Collections was a British publishing firm who released a variety of association football sticker collections during the late 1980s and 1990s, they also designed trading cards, card games, and pogs. Although most notably releasing football stickers in particularly for the Premier League and Serie A, they also designed collections around television shows and other points of interest.

In 1993 the company became known as "Merlin Publishing International PLC" before being bought out by Topps in 1995. They were absorbed into the company, being renamed "Topps Europe Limited", although the name Merlin would continue as a brand under the Topps name initially until 2008. In 2014 the Merlin brand returned to the Premier League sticker collections until Panini was awarded the contract in 2019. Today the Merlin brand is used by Topps as a retro range designed around its UEFA club competitions trading cards.

== History ==
Merlin Publishing Ltd was founded in 1989 by Kelvyn Gardner, Peter Dunk, Peter Warsop, with Mark Hillier being asked to join shortly after. The 2015 book 'Stuck On You: The Rise and Fall...& Rise of Panini Stickers' by Greg Lansdowne, and the 2017 ITV documentary inspired by the book, 'Stuck On You: The Football Sticker Story' tells much of the history of Merlin Publishing and its meteoric rise and the ensuing battle with Robert Maxwell and his underhanded tactics. They had previously worked for Panini Group, but decided to leave after Panini were acquired by Robert Maxwell. Merlin grew very quickly to become a major player in the European market for collectable stickers and cards. It became public by 1993 as Merlin Publishing International PLC. By 1995, the company's progress was such that it won the prestigious Price Waterhouse/Independent on Sunday award for the fastest growing privately held British company.

Football leagues licenses
Competition	League
1998	Norwegian Tippeligaen
1995–1999	Danish Superliga
1994–2019	English Premier League
1991–2008	Italian Serie A
2020–2022	UEFA Champions League

The company's official Premier League football collection launched in 1994 and has become, annually, the world's best selling sticker collection, the Merlin name would continue on the official collection until 2008 where it was rebranded as Topps before Panini won the contract in 2020. Merlin reached the old Panini levels, shifting 76m packets in the Premier League's early years, while Panini's last British domestic album dived to sales of no more than three to four million packets, in 1990.

In this period, as well as producing BattleCards in 1993, the company produced other best selling sticker and card collections including The Magic of Beano, Nintendo, World Wrestling Entertainment Superstars, Gladiators, Street Fighter II, Jurassic Park, Batman, and Power Rangers.

In 1995, the Topps Company Inc. completed its takeover of Merlin Publishing. Merlin's official company name changed to Topps Europe Limited, but its products still carried the Merlin brand until 2008 as it was easily recognized by consumers.

In 2014 Topps announced it would once again use the Merlin brand for its 2015 Premier League sticker collection.

== Products ==
=== Merlin's Premier League stickers ===
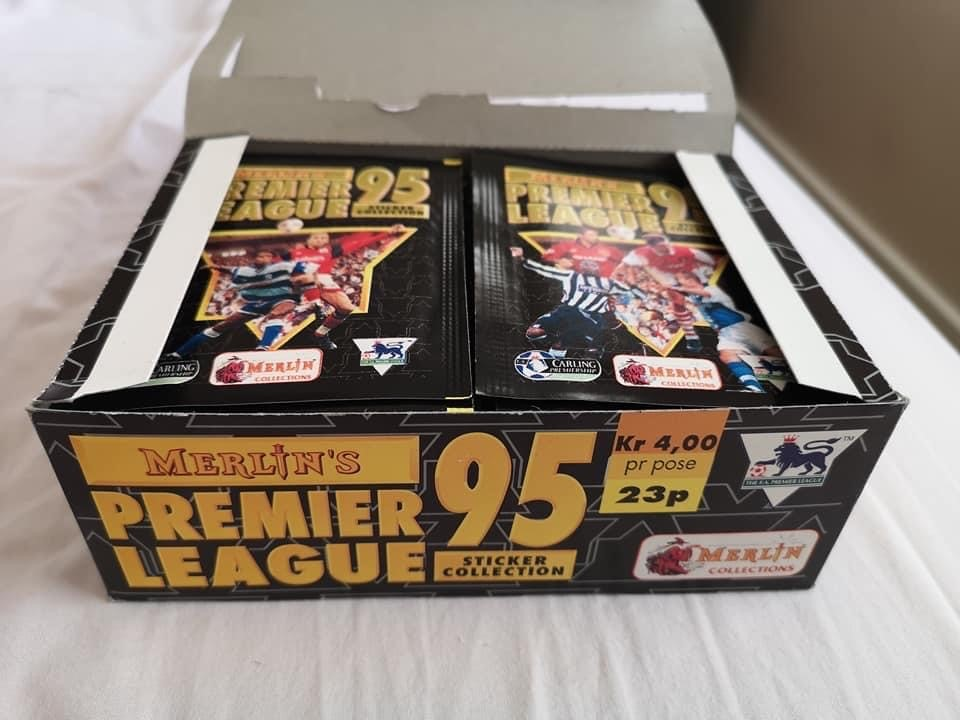
A box of 'Merlin's Premier League 95' sticker packets as they would appear for sale in a supermarket or newsagent's shop.

The Premier League was founded in 1992, but the only sticker album to feature the 1992–93 season was Panini's "Football 93" that wasn't an official product. In 1993 the Premier League chief executive David Dein approached Merlin about producing an album for the 1993–94 season, with Dein approaching Merlin because of his friendship with director Patricia Kluge.

Merlin's Premier League 94 was the debut collection with Manchester United's Ryan Giggs and Arsenal's Paul Merson chosen as the players featured on the album cover. The album consisted of 479 stickers across 80 pages, featuring all twenty-two teams, each having 15 player stickers, a shiny glitter backed club crest, a team photo, shiny club jersey sticker and matchday programme sticker. The foreword was written by Sky Sports co-commentator Andy Gray. Other notable stickers include the "Number 1" which was the Premier League logo, the trophy and the Sky Sports logo. Merlin struggled to meet demand of reprints such was the popularity and demand.

In 1995 following the companies take over by Topps, The Merlin 95 collection included 3D stickers and inserted 3D glasses, stickers were also promoted by Kellogg's in Corn Flakes with free packets of stickers given away. They also released "Magicaps" a form of pogs consisting of 264 caps featuring some of the players and logos featured in the sticker collection.

McDonald's became a feature of Merlin's 96 collection with specialised stickers in the central page sections, these franchise stickers were also featured in the 97 and 98 collections. The 96 collection also featured a promotion by Nestle Shreddies who also gave out free packets with their cereal.

The Merlin brand on the Premier League collections would run until 2008, when the collection was finally branded "Topps Premier League", this lasted until 2014 when the name Merlin was re-introduced as a brand.

In 2019, Topps would lose the Premier League contract for the first time with Panini winning the rights to take over the series for the impending 2019–20 season, thus ending the series.

=== Games ===
BattleCards featured a unique "Scratch and Slay" system created by Steve Jackson. The cards came in 10 card booster packs which included warrior cards, spell cards, advanced combat cards, quest cards, and treasure cards. The game was published in both the UK and the United States with a number of differences between the two releases. debuted at Gen Con 1993 (exactly same time as Magic: The Gathering saw public release) and was marketed as a trading card game.

On rare occasions, it is debated whether the game counts as the world's first CCG along with Magic. However, the game is not played with a deck and there is no collectibility involved. The Scrye guide acknowledges the limited playability of the game as "use them once and they're worthless" which strictly disqualifies it as a collectible card game. Darwin Bromley of Mayfair Games noted that the scratch-offs would crack when shuffled, and once scratched off "you had to either play the game or collect it." "You couldn't have your cake and eat it too."

In 1997 the company released a marbles game based on their Premier League 97 sticker collection, coined "Flick-A-Balls", with a collection number of 240, each marble contained the image of one of the football players from the sticker collection, the collection was not repeated in 1998.

== In popular culture ==
In 2021, the "Searching for Shineys" podcast launched in which the presenters attempted to track down and interview players who featured in Merlin's Premier League 97 sticker album. The podcast ran for 20 episodes over two seasons.

== Legacy ==
Merlin's Premier League stickers have become a synonymous with British culture of the 90's, along with Panini's collections they are widely recognised amongst British football fans as a past time mainly collected by children and swapped about in school playgrounds. The "Number 1" sticker (usually the Premier League badge) was often depicted as the most sacred sticker to collect, other childhood habits included dealing in such a way that a shiny sticker was worth the value of several normal stickers.

In 2013, a man from Portsmouth found his old 'Premier League 96' album in his attic and realised he hadn't completed it like he thought. He then set off on a mission to locate the remaining six players to take his own photograph of them to stick in his book. It took him six months to locate and travel and visit each player they were Keith Curle, Stuart Ripley, Scott Minto, Gary Penrice, Lars Bohinen and Philippe Albert. He later wrote a book about the experience.

In 2020, Topps released "Merlin Heritage 95" card collection for the seasons UEFA Champions League collection, the packaging and card design was based on the same design as the 'Merlin Premier League 95' collection. In 2021, Topps announced their UCL cards for the 2021–22 season would be named "Merlin Heritage 97" and would be released using the same template designs used in from "Merlin's Premier League 97"

== Collections ==
=== Football ===
Football sticker and card collections released by Merlin Publishing or later by Topps using the Merlin brand.

Year	Collection Name	Competition / League / Team	Sticker/Cards in collection	Players Featured on Album Cover
2021	Merlin Heritage 97 2021–22	UEFA Champions League		Phil Foden, Cristiano Ronaldo, Federico Chiesa, Jamal Musiala
2021	Merlin Chrome 2020–21	UEFA Champions League & UEFA Europa League	2609	Erling Haaland, Kylian Mbappe, Son Heung-min, Wesley Fofana
2020	Merlin Heritage 95 2020–21	UEFA Champions League	1288	None
2018	Merlin's Premier League 2019	English Premier League	310	Marcus Rashford, Roberto Firmino, Dele Alli, Eden Hazard, Sergio Aguero
2017	Merlin's Premier League 2018	English Premier League	344	Gabriel Jesus, Jamie Vardy, Harry Kane, Marcus Rashford, Eden Hazard
2016	Merlin's Premier League 2017	English Premier League	344	Sergio Aguero, Dele Alli, Paul Pogba, Diego Costa, Philippe Coutinho
2016	Merlin's Premier League 2016	English Premier League	505	Theo Walcott, David Silva, Eden Hazard, Christian Eriksen, Anthony Martial
2015	Merlin's Premier League 2015	English Premier League	505	Diego Costa, Sergio Aguero, Raheem Sterling, Aaron Ramsey
2007	Serie A 2008 Super Campionato: The Evolution	Italian Serie A	440	Gianluigi Buffon, Kaká, Zlatan Ibrahimovic, Mauro Esposito, Simone Del Nero
2007	Merlin's Premier League 2007–2008	English Premier League	649	Fernando Torres, Wayne Rooney, Robin van Persie, John Terry, Michael Owen
2007	Merlin's Premier League 2007–2008: Kick Off	English Premier League	208	Nani, Freddie Ljungberg, Cesc Fabregas, Didier Drogba
2007	Merlin's Premier League 06–07	English Premier League	528	Cristiano Ronaldo, Thierry Henry, Scott Parker, Frank Lampard, Steven Gerrard
2007	Calcio Merlin 2007 Pocket Collection	Italian Serie A	445	Alessandro Del Piero, Zlatan Ibrahimovic, Kaká, Francesco Totti
2006	Merlin's Premier League 06–07: Kick Off	English Premier League	213	Michael Carrick, Thierry Henry, Michael Ballack, Damien Duff
2006	Italia Passaporto per la Germania 2006	Italy national team for World Cup 2006	124	Gennaro Gattuso, Alessandro Del Piero, Francesco Totti, Andrea Pirlo
2006	Worldstars 2006 Pocket Collection	World Cup 2006	92	Roberto Carlos, Fernando Morientes, Deco, Hernan Crespo, Patrick Vieira, Fernando Carvalho
2006	2006 England	England national team for World Cup 2006	448	Michael Owen, Frank Lampard, David Beckham, Wayne Rooney
2006	Calcio Merlin 2006 Pocket Collection	Italian Serie A	440	Andriy Shevchenko, Adriano, Zlatan Ibrahimovic, Luca Toni
2005	FA Premier League 2005–2006: Sticker Quiz Collection	English Premier League	236	Tim Cahill, Cristiano Ronaldo, Edgar Davids, Fernando Morientes
2005	Premier Stars 2005–2006	English Premier League	227	Alan Shearer, Steven Gerrard, Robbie Fowler, Jay Jay Okocha, Ryan Giggs, Emile Heskey
2005	Merlin's FA Premier League 06	English Premier League	528	Michael Owen, Thierry Henry, Steven Gerrard, Wayne Rooney, Frank Lampard
2004	Calcio Merlin 2005 Pocket Collection	Italian Serie A	456	Adriano, Gennaro Gattuso, Emerson, Antonio Cassano
2004	Merlin's Kick Off 2004–2005	English Premier League	402	Frank Lampard, Louis Saha, Juan Pablo Angel, Michael Owen, Thierry Henry
2004	Merlin's Premier League 05	English Premier League	574	Thierry Henry. Wayne Rooney, Patrick Kluivert, Milan Baros, Frank Lampard
2004	Calcio Merlin 2004 Pocket Collection	Italian Serie A	402	Francesco Totti, Kaká, Obafemi Martins, Mauro Camoranesi
2004	Eurostars 2004 Pocket Collection	UEFA Euro 2004	208	Frank de Boer, Raul Gonzalez, Patrick Vieira, Andriy Shevchenko, Martin Petrov
2004	England 2004	England national team for UEFA Euro 2004	384	Paul Scholes, Steven Gerrard, David Beckham, Michael Owen, Wayne Rooney
2003	FA Premier League 2003–04 Pocket Collection	English Premier League	162	Nicolas Anelka, Ole Gunnar Solskjaer, Alan Shearer, Thierry Henry. Svetoslav Todorov
2003	Merlin's Premier League 04	English Premier League	598	Steven Gerrard, Nicolas Anelka, Ruud van Nistelrooy, Juan Sebastian Veron, Thierry Henry
2003	The Official FA Premier League 2002–2003	English Premier League	578	David Beckham, Eidur Gudjohnsen, Michael Owen, Patrick Vieira, Kieron Dyer
2003	Calcio Merlin 2003 Pocket Collection	Italian Serie A	252	Hernan Crespo, Francesco Totti, Alessandro Del Piero, Alessandro Nesta
2002	England 2002	England national team for World Cup 2002	310	Rio Ferdinand, David Beckham, Michael Owen
2002	Ireland 2002	Republic of Ireland national team for World Cup 2002	242	Robbie Keane, Roy Keane, Ian Harte, Jason McAteer, Steve Finnan
2002	Calcio Merlin 2002	Italian Serie A	600	Filippo Inzaghi, Ronaldo, Pavel Nedved, Hidetoshi Nakata, Francesco Totti, Alessandro Nesta
2002	The Official FA Premier League 2001–02	English Premier League	508	Juan Sebastian Veron, Rio Ferdinand, Michael Owen, Jimmy Floyd Hasselbaink
2001	Calcio: Merlin Extreme	Italian Serie A	256	None
2001	Calcio Merlin 2001	Italian Serie A	686	Zinedine Zidane, Alessandro Nesta, Francesco Totti, Christian Vieri, Andriy Shevchenko
2000	Calcio Merlin 2000	Italian Serie A	712	Zinedine Zidane, Oliver Bierhoff, Alessandro Nesta, Christian Vieri, Gabriel Batistuta
2000	The Official FA Premier League Collection	English Premier League	448	Michael Owen, Jimmy Floyd Hasselbaink, David Beckham, Thierry Henry, Paolo Di Canio
2000	Merlin's Euro 2000	UEFA Euro 2000	195	Steve McManaman, Paul Scholes, Alan Shearer, David Beckham, Michael Owen, Edgar Davids, Fernando Hierro, Emmanuel Petit
1999	Merlin's Premier Gold 2000	English Premier League	160	David Ginola, David Beckham, Tore Andre Flo
1999	Serie A 2000	Italian Serie A	324	Hernan Crespo, Hidetoshi Nakata, Mauro Esposito, Ibrahim Ba, Edoardo Artistico, Mohamed Kallon, Alessandro Lucarelli, Alvaro Recoba
1999	The Official FA Premier League 2000	English Premier League	552	Dwight Yorke, Harry Kewell, Thierry Henry, Gianfranco Zola
1999	Merlin's Faxe Kondi Ligaen 2000	Danish Superliga	153	Peter Madsen
1999	Merlin's Premier League 99: Transfer Update Edition	English Premier League	67	Dion Dublin, Duncan Ferguson, Wes Brown
1999	Kick Off 99	Italian Serie A	228	Christian Vieri, Andriy Shevchenko, Filippo Inzaghi, Marcelo Salas
1998	Merlin's Calcio 99	Italian Serie A	644	Gabriel Batistuta, Francesco Totti, Paolo Maldini, Christian Vieri, Alessandro Del Piero, Roberto Baggio
1998	Merlin's Calcio D'Inizio Kick Off 98–99	Italian Serie A	210	Ronaldo, Oliver Bierhoff, Alessandro Del Piero, Gabriel Batistuta
1998	Merlin's Premier Gold 99	English Premier League	182	Tore Andre Flo, Peter Schmeichel, Dennis Bergkamp
1998	Merlin's Serie A 99	Italian Serie A	226	Hidetoshi Nakata, Roberto Baggio, Leonardo
1998	Merlin's Premier League 99	English Premier League	557	Dennis Bergkamp, David Beckham, Michael Owen
1999	Merlin's Premier League Kick Off	English Premier League	192	Peter Schmeichel, David Ginola, Michael Owen, Dennis Bergkamp
1998	Merlin's Faxe Kondi Ligaen 99	Danish Superliga	152	
1998	Premier Gold 98	English Premier League	186	Robbie Fowler, Alan Shearer, Steffen Iversen
1998	England 1998	England national team for World Cup 1998	308	Glenn Hoddle, Steve McManaman, Paul Ince, Alan Shearer, David Beckham
1998	Azzurri Con IP 1982–1998	Italy national team for World Cup 1998	100	None
1998	Merlin's Tippeligaen Trading Cards 98	Norwegian Tippeligaen	124	
1997	Merlin's Calcio D'Inizio Kick Off	Italian Serie A	180	George Weah, Ronaldo, Alessandro Del Piero
1997	Merlin's Premier League 98	English Premier League	504	Gary Neville, David Beckham, Roy Keane, Ian Wright, Eyal Berkovic, Gianluca Vialli, Gianfranco Zola
1997	Merlin's Premier League Kick Off 97–98	English Premier League	217	Tim Flowers, David Beckham, Gianfranco Zola
1997	Newcastle United Photocards 1997–1998	Newcastle United	172	None
1997	Merlin's Faxe Kondi Ligaen 98	Danish Superliga	155	
1997	Merlin's Calcio 98	Italian Serie A	576	Ronaldo, Alessandro Del Piero, Paolo Maldini
1996	Merlin's Premier Gold	English Premier League	196	Eric Cantona, Fabrizio Ravanelli, Alan Shearer
1996	Merlin's Premier League 97	English Premier League	563	Eric Cantona, Alan Shearer
1996	FA Premier League Collector Cards	English Premier League	96	None
1996	Liverpool FC Photocards	Liverpool	72	None
1996	Merlin's Faxe Kondi Ligaen 97	Danish Superliga	129	
1996	UEFA Euro 96	UEFA Euro 96	609	None
1996	Merlin's Premier League 96	English Premier League	530	Nick Barmby, David Ginola, Jamie Redknapp
1995	Merlin Ultimate: Premier League Cards	English Premier League	245	Jamie Redknapp, Alan Shearer
1995	Merlin's Coca-Cola Superligaen 96	Danish Superliga	240	
1995	Merlin's Calcio 95	Italian Serie A	324	Gabriel Batistuta, Fabrizio Ravanelli, Paolo Maldini
1994	Merlin's Premier League 95	English Premier League	529	Eric Cantona, Alan Shearer, Andy Cole. Alan Smith
1993	Merlin's Premier League 94	English Premier League	479	Ryan Giggs, Paul Merson
1993	Official Premier League Collectors Cards	English Premier League	120	None
1993	Calcio 94	Italian Serie A	427	Paolo Maldini, Roberto Baggio, Ruud Gullit, Eugenio Corini, Ruben Sosa, Giuseppe Signori
1992	Calcio 93	Italian Serie A	418	Franco Baresi, Ciro Ferrara, Michael Laudrup, David Platt, Roberto Mancini, Lorenzo Minotti, Salvatore Schillaci
1992	Calcio Cards	Italian Serie A	54	Gianluca Vialli
1992	Merlin Shooting Stars	Dutch Eredivisie	272	Marc Overmars
1992	The Coca-Cola Collection	British International footballers	17	None
1991	Shooting Stars	English Football League	408	None
1991	Shooting Stars	Italian Serie A	363	None
1991	Shooting Stars	Dutch Eredivisie	270	Dennis Bergkamp
1990	World Cup Sticker Collection: Italia 1990	World Cup 1990	344	Gary Lineker, Richard Gough
1989	Team 90	English Football League	450	None

=== Other Sports ===
Other sports sticker and card collections released by Merlin Publishing or later by Topps using the Merlin brand.

Year	Collection Name	Competition / League / Team	Sticker/Cards in collection
2008	WWE Heroes	World Wrestling Entertainment	230
2007	WWE Champions	World Wrestling Entertainment	260
2008	WWE Superstars: Uncovered	World Wrestling Entertainment	232
2008	WWE Heroes	World Wrestling Entertainment	230
1999	IRB Rugby World Cup 99	Rugby World Cup 1999	252
1996	Cyclisme 96	Tour de France	243
1996	Merlin's Sky Sports 1996	A collection of sports featured on Sky Sports.	240
1995	Giro d'Italia 78	Giro d'Italia	336
1995	Rugby World Cup 1995	Rugby World Cup 1995	288
1993	WWF – World Wrestling Federation	World Wrestling Federation	300
1992	WWF 1992	World Wrestling Federation	300
1991	WWF Superstars of Wrestling Series 2	World Wrestling Federation	396
1991	WWF Superstar	World Wrestling Federation	150

=== Film and television ===
Film and Television sticker and card collections released by Merlin Publishing or later by Topps using the Merlin brand.

Year	Collection Name	Related Show	Sticker/Cards in collection
2009	The Adventures of Merlin	Merlin	204
2008	Ben 10	Ben 10	204
2008	Ben 10: New Adventures	Ben 10	206
2008	Winx Club. Pocket Collection. Dalla A alla Z	Winx Club	160
2008	Winx Club. Enchantix. Pocket Collection	Winx Club	190
2008	SpongeBob	SpongeBob SquarePants	200
2008	Star Wars II: The Clone Wars	Star Wars	240
2008	Indiana Jones & The Kingdom of the Crystal Skull	Indiana Jones	240
2007	Winx Club: Pocket Collection	Winx Club	160
2007	SpongeBob	SpongeBob SquarePants	250
2007	Doctor Who 3	Doctor Who	264
2007	TransFormers	Transformers	200
2006	Barbie au Bal des 12 Princesses	Barbie	204
2006	Winx Club: Pocket Collection	Winx Club	160
2006	Happy Feet	Happy Feet	198
2006	Doctor Who 2	Doctor Who	282
2006	Doctor Who	Doctor Who	208
2005	Barbie Fashion	Barbie	242
2005	Dora the Explorer	Dora the Explorer	169
2005	SpongeBob	SpongeBob SquarePants	160
2005	Yu-Gi-Oh! Series 2	Yu-Gi-Oh!	256
2005	La Principessa e la Povera	Barbie	168
2005	Star Wars: Episode III	Star Wars	248
2005	Pokémon: Ultimate Stickers	Pokémon	368
2004	Hamtaro: Series 2	Hamtaro	160
2004	InuYasha	InuYasha	246
2004	Mew Mew	Mew Mew	205
2004	Pokémon Advanced	Pokémon	241
2004	Pretty Cure	Pretty Cure	210
2004	SpongeBob SquarePants	SpongeBob SquarePants	264
2004	Yu-Gi-Oh! Pocket Collection	Yu-Gi-Oh!	58
2004	Barbie Collection Princesses	Barbie	246
2003	Hamtaro Series 1	Hamtaro	201
2003	Pokémon Advanced Pocket Collection	Pokémon	222
2003	Tourtes Ninja	Teenage Mutant Ninja Turtles	248
2003	Totally Spies!	Totally Spies!	236
2003	Yu-Gi-Oh!	Yu-Gi-Oh!	110
2003	Lord of the Rings: Return of the King	Lord of the Rings	248
2002	Holly e Benji	Captain Tsubasa	180
2002	Pokémon 5: Johnto League Champions	Pokémon	198
2002	Lord of the Rings: The Two Towers	Lord of the Rings	200
2002	Star Wars: Episode II	Star Wars	248
2002	Spider-Man	Spider-Man	168
2001	Jurassic Park 3	Jurassic Park	134
2001	Pokémon 4	Pokémon	198
2001	Pokémon 3	Pokémon	126
2001	Rossana	Rossana	204
2001	Lord of the Rings: The Fellowship of the Ring	Lord of the Rings	280
2003	Lord of the Rings: Return of the King	Lord of the Rings	248
2000	Pokémon 2	Pokémon	216
1999	Magica Doremi	Ojamajo Doremi	192
1999	Medabots	Medabots	216
1999	Star Wars Episode I	Star Wars	267
1999	Magica Doremi	Ojamajo Doremi	192
1998	Small Soldiers	Small Soldiers	206
1998	Zorro	Zorro	168
1997	Goosebumps	Goosebumps	180
1997	Street Sharks	Street Sharks	204
1997	Star Wars Trilogy: Movie Trading Cards	Star Wars	192
1997	Rugrats	Rugrats	174
1997	Calimero	Calimero	126
1996	Dragon Flyz	Dragon Flyz	204
1996	Il Commissario Rex	Inspector Rex	108
1996	Lupin III. Lupin, L'Incorreggibile Lupin	Lupin the Third	180
1996	Manga	Manga	168
1996	Sailor Moon: New Series	Sailor Moon	289
1996	Sailor Moon	Sailor Moon	163
1996	The Mask: The Animated Series	The Mask	160
1996	Balto	Balto	174
1996	Independence Day	Independence Day	156
1996	The Lost World: Jurassic Park	Jurassic Park	228
1995	Holly e Benji	Captain Tsubasa	180
1995	Power Rangers 2	Power Rangers	198
1995	Power Rangers: The Movie	Power Rangers	198
1995	Sailor Moon	Sailor Moon	240
1995	Taz-Mania	Taz-Mania	180
1995	The Adventures of Mighty Max	The Adventures of Mighty Max	200
1995	The Pagemaster	The Pagemaster	204
1995	Wallace and Gromit	Wallace and Gromit	180
1995	Batman Forever	Batman	210
1995	Pokémon	Pokémon	276
1995	Polly Pocket	Polly Pocket	216
1995	RoboCop	RoboCop	228
1995	The Smurfs	The Smurfs	210
1994	Power Rangers	Power Rangers	246
1994	Stargate	Stargate SG1	180
1994	Super Street Fighter 2	Street Fighter	216
1994	The Beano and The Dandy: All Time Greats	The Beano/The Dandy	246
1994	The Mask	The Mask	168
1994	Biker Mice from Mars	Biker Mice from Mars	216
1993	Captain Scarlet & The Mysterons	Captain Scarlet and the Mysterons	192
1993	Gladiators	Gladiators	356
1994	James Bond Jr.	James Bond Jr.	246
1993	Jurassic Park	Jurassic Park	240
1993	Marmalade Boy: Piccoli Problemi di Cuore	Marmalade Boy	180
1993	The Young Indiana Jones Chronicles	Young Indiana Jones	180
1992	Gladiators	Gladiators	192
1992	Gladiators	Gladiators	264
1992	Tiny Toon Adventures	Tiny Toon Adventures	162
1991	Street Fighter 2	Street Fighter	240
1989	The Magic of The Beano	The Beano	224
1989	Dragon Ball	Dragon Ball	180

=== Other Collections ===
Film and Television sticker and card collections released by Merlin Publishing or later by Topps using the Merlin brand.

Year	Collection Name	Sticker/Cards in collection
2002	Baby Animals	144
2000	Precious Kitties	120
1994	Crash Dummies	180
1992	Nintendo	276

=== Games ===
Card released by Merlin Publishing or later by Topps using the Merlin brand.

Year	Collection Name
1997	Merlin's Premier League 97 Flick-A-Balls
1993	BattleCards

=== Pogs ===
Pogs released by Merlin Publishing or later by Topps using the Merlin brand.

Year	Collection Name	Competition/Theme
1996	Merlin's Premier League 96 Magicaps	English Premier League
1995	Merlin's Premier League 95 Magicaps	English Premier League

== See also ==
- Association football trading card
- Sticker album
