= Mighty Max (TV series) =

Animated TV series

- Opening sequence artwork
- Genre: Fantasy; Horror; Science fiction Superhero
- Developed by: Mark Zaslove; Rob Hudnut
- Directed by: Gary Hartle (season 1)
- Voices of: Rob Paulsen; Tony Jay; Richard Moll; Tim Curry
- Theme music composer: John D'Andrea & Cory Lerios
- Countries of origin: France; United Kingdom; United States
- No. of seasons: 2
- No. of episodes: 40

Production
- Executive producers: Phil Roman; Rob Hudnut
- Producer: Gary Hartle
- Running time: 21 minutes
- Production companies: Bluebird Toys; Canal+ D.A. Film Roman

Original release
- Network: Syndication (Amazin' Adventures) (U.S.); BBC (United Kingdom); Canal+ (France)
- Release: September 1, 1993 – December 2, 1994

Mighty Max is an animated action/horror television series created by Mark Zaslove and Rob Hudnut based on the British Mighty Max toys, an outgrowth of the Polly Pocket line created by Bluebird Toys in 1992.

== Plot ==
The series follows Max, an adventurous teenage boy who receives in the mail a small statue of a fowl, inscribed with Egyptian hieroglyphs whereof the translation states: "You have been chosen to be the cap-bearer. Go to the mini-mart and wait for a sign, Mighty Max". Shocked by the message, Max drops the statue, shattering it and revealing a red baseball cap emblazoned with a yellow "M", which he dons. The cap is capable of projecting wormhole-like "portals" through which Max can teleport across space and time.

Upon arriving at the mini-mart, Max is chased by a lava-monster sent by antagonist 'Skullmaster'. As Max flees, the cap teleports them to the Mongolian desert, where he befriends Virgil, a nearly omniscient Lemurian whose appearance is that of an anthropomorphic "fowl" (a running gag in the series is that Max refers to Virgil as a "chicken" to which the Lemurian replies "Fowl, actually"), who explains that Max's reception of the cap was prophesied c. 3000 B.C. Thereafter Max, Virgil, and Norman, his Viking bodyguard, travel together around the world, defending Earth against the minions of Skullmaster, who is responsible for the downfall of the Lemurians. Norman is supposedly immortal and identified as or with Sir Lancelot, Thor, Samson, and Hercules. Most plot-driving episodes involve Skullmaster or one of his monstrous followers, but in many episodes, Max is required to stop an independent villain. While all episodes involve travel across Earth, one involves time travel, and the portal can even extend into the astral plane (as seen in the episode "Souls of Talon").

While generally lighthearted and comical, the show's violence and descriptions of violent acts were considered excessive by some viewers. Many episodes began with a depiction of the story's principal monster killing a victim, whereas the series finale featured Max, Norman, and Virgil pitted against Skullmaster and their previously defeated foes. Both Norman and Virgil are killed, leaving Max to defeat Skullmaster. Unable to do so, Max uses the cap in order to time travel to the events of the first episode, creating a time paradox. At first, he experiences déjà vu, but after he reads Virgil's modified letter, he recalls everything, and decides to use the knowledge he gained from the initial timeline to set it right in order to defeat Skullmaster once and for all.

=== Educational epilogues ===
In all episodes, a short ending scene preludes the credits, wherein Max is shown at his desk in his room, where he discusses with the audience some aspect of the episode in an educational way (similar to other children's cartoon series, including The Magic School Bus), usually the location where the events took place, the type of monster that was fought, etc. Occasionally, Max is shown in another setting such as a library or museum, or is simply heard recorded on an answering machine (such as "Armageddon Outta Here", the series finale), but these sequences were not broadcast on some channels, such as the British terrestrial airings on BBC1 (though included on the Nickelodeon airings). Generally, the educational messages at the end of each episode were of scientific, historical, or cultural significance (for example, the mythology of another culture; new astronomical theories of the time; the biology of a giant squid; or the fact that Native Americans were first believed to be Indians by European explorers).

In addition to the epilogue, facts are unobtrusively given in show, often by Virgil's comment.

== Characters ==
=== Heroes ===
- Max / Mighty Max (voiced by Rob Paulsen) is the protagonist of the series: a rambunctious, clever, and blond teen empowered, through a series of adventures, to protect the signature cap that enables travel through various places. Max sometimes claims reluctance to retain this role, but Virgil and the cap leave him with little choice.
- Virgil (voiced by Tony Jay) is a fowl-like humanoid, the last living Lemurian and Max's mentor. He is over ten thousand years old, and knowledgeable of both past and future, but often frustrated by Max's carefree ways (which include teasingly calling Virgil a "chicken") and frequently reminded of having mentored Skullmaster, who consequently destroyed his people later on. Virgil would often send unusual messages to Max on where to go in order to get taken through a portal to meet up with him.
- Norman (voiced by Richard Moll as an adult, Jason Marsden as a child) is Max's bodyguard who, after failing to prevent his father's defeat, vowed to become the greatest warrior that ever lived. After a lifetime of battle, Norman was appointed by Virgil to his current role. He earned his immortality by defeating the Conqueror, an undefeated champion, and swore to defend the Mighty One with his life if necessary. As the Mighty One's bodyguard, Norman is usually serious but, unlike Virgil, seems to enjoy Max's carefree ways. Norman's exploits through the ages were the basis of numerous legends, including those of Thor, Hercules, Samson, Lancelot, and Little John. Norman is shown throughout the series to be fearless, but not above disgust and has a fear of spiders. It is hinted in the final episode that he may have finally met his match in combat and died at the hands of an enormous spider. His common catchphrase is, "I eat [X] for breakfast", usually naming his enemy. Another is the wry statement made upon meeting one of the many monsters they encounter, "That is a big [X]".

=== Allies ===
- Max's Mother (voiced by Tress MacNeille) is a blonde archaeologist who works for the local museum. She often travels all over the world and usually leaves Max to his own devices. More than once Max has had to rescue her, but despite misgivings, she and Virgil often have historical discussions and she is one of the few people who can out-talk Virgil.
- Bea (voiced by Kath Soucie) is one of Max's two best friends. Bea is an intelligent young girl who has assisted and sometimes rescued Max. Level-headed and cool under pressure, she often balances Max's exuberance with a more intellectual approach.
- Felix (voiced by Corey Burton) is Max's friend who takes Max's new heroism in stride. Felix has assisted Max on numerous occasions, but usually gets left behind when the adventure starts, only to be relied upon thereafter.
- Thor is Max's pet green iguana and loyal companion. During Max's first encounter with antagonist Dr. Zygote, Thor was "devolved" into a dinosaur and ended up rescuing Max from Zygote's Tyrannosaurus rex-like "Mutosaurus" (as seen in "Zygote's Rhythm"). Later, Max "devolved" Thor back into his usual, pocket-sized self.

=== Villains ===
- Skullmaster (voiced by Tim Curry) is the main villain of the series and the nemesis of the Mighty One. Skullmaster is an ancient warrior/sorcerer whose lust for power has driven him to destroy the Lemurians. Afterwards, Skullmaster was imprisoned in the Underworld after the final battle with Max's predecessor Maximus where he took command of the inhabitants there. During the second season, Skullmaster is freed to roam the Earth itself and seeks to control the universe.
  - Warmonger (voiced by Frank Welker) is a demon and Skullmaster's errand runner. Cruel and sadistic, he briefly showed ambition when he tried to kill Skullmaster in the episode "I, Warmonger", but found himself ignorant of what to do with his newfound power and position. The death of Skullmaster proved to be a ruse and Skullmaster himself was proud of Warmonger for showing such deviousness and plans to reward him later.
  - Double-Headed Dragon is a double-headed dragon that serve Skullmaster.
  - Giant Crabs - a race of large crabs that serve Skullmaster.
  - Rock Monsters – a race of rock monsters that serve Skullmaster.
  - Skeleturtles – a race of skeletal turtles that serve Skullmaster.
- Lava Lord (voiced by Frank Welker) is the previous ruler of Underworld, dethroned and sealed in solid rock by Skullmaster. At the beginning of season 2, Lava Lord was freed and recovered the allegiance of the Lava Beasts. He planned to destroy Skullmaster with a giant robot called Magus. Though Lava Lord has no love for humans, his hatred for Skullmaster has caused him to align with Max on more than one occasion.
  - Magus is a giant lava-powered robot working for Lava Lord who treated it like his own son.
  - Lava Beasts are a race of creatures of molten rock that served Lava Lord until his defeat by Skullmaster. The Lava Beasts were later restored to Lava Lord.
- Cyberskull (voiced by Danny Goldman) – Marlin Curt is a programmer who merged with a computer virus and discovered that he can alter reality and become electricity. He plotted revenge on the founder of MegaCorp for stealing his ideas. Cyberskull later returned to create a physical body for himself.
- Professor Eggbert Zygote (voiced by Kenneth Mars) is a mad scientist with plans to manipulate evolution. In his first appearance in "Zygote's Rhythm", he developed a machine that devolved reptilian life to their dinosaur forms. Max unintentionally evolves him into a form with a large brain. Zygote escapes into the sea following the fight. In "Zygote Music", Zygote has mastered the psychic abilities that came with his new form. He captures a telepathic boy whom he believes to be the key to human evolution. He is "defeated" when he evolves into a being of pure consciousness, losing interest in "such primitive concepts as good and evil".
- Arachnoid (voiced by René Auberjonois) – Dr. Stanley Kirby is a scientist who was mutated into the half-spider Arachnoid.
- Talon (voiced by David Warner) is a giant skull-like entity that feeds on the souls of the living. He requires Mighty Max's cap to escape from the astral plane into the dimension. In "Armageddon Outta Here", Skullmaster uses Talon to carry a message to Max to show up at Stonehenge or else he will kill Virgil.
- Fuath is a gigantic clockwork stone golem that was created by a sect of druids to plan revenge on humanity. Max, Virgil, and Norman were able to defeat Fuath by taking out the crystal that powered it. In "Armageddon Outta Here", Skullmaster summons Fuath to fight Lava Lord and Magus.

== Episodes ==
Season	Episodes	Originally released	
Season	Episodes	First released	Last released
1	13	September 1, 1993	December 8, 1993
2	27	September 22, 1994	December 2, 1994

=== Season 1 (1993) ===
No. overall	No. in season	Title	Written by	Storyboarded by	Original release date
1	1	"A Bellwether in One's Cap"	S : Rob Hudnut; S/T : Mark Zaslove	Jeff Snow, Gary Graham and Steve Lyons	September 1, 1993
Max receives a package in the mail containing a small statue inscribed with Egyptian hieroglyphs that read: "You have been chosen to be the cap-bearer. Go to the mini-mart and wait for a sign, Mighty Max". Shocked by the message, Max drops the statue, shattering it and revealing a red baseball cap emblazoned with a yellow 'M'. Upon arriving at the minimart, Max is chased by a lava-monster sent by Skullmaster. As Max flees, the cap activates a vortex which transports him instantly from his current location to the Mongolian desert. Max is met by Virgil and Norman where he learns that his destiny had been foretold in a prophecy, circa 3,000 BC. Based on: Mighty Max Trapped in Skull Mountain
2	2	"The Brain Suckers Cometh!"	S : Mark Zaslove; T : Steve Sustarsic and Robin Quinn	Gray Graham	September 8, 1993
Max's afternoon plans are interrupted when Virgil explains that he must again save the world. This time he is whisked away to protect the Earth from an invasion of brain-devouring aliens. Neither Max nor Virgil's skills include complex computer codes. A very reluctant Max must turn to the school's most annoying computer nerd, Ernie, in order to break the alien codes and save the planet. Based on: Mighty Max Terminates Wolfship 7
3	3	"Snakes & Laddies"	S : Mark Zaslove and Cindy Beagle; T : Jeremy Cushner	Gray Graham and Jeff Snow	September 15, 1993
Max's attempts to attract the attention of Jiffie, a girl in his class, are interrupted by a short stint in Egypt with Bea. There Max finds and snatches an amulet, presenting it to Jiffie and winning her affection. The amulet however belongs to a cult of snake-creatures and they arrive to reclaim it. They then kidnap Jiffie, planning to sacrifice the new bearer of the amulet so that their leader can continue his immortal existence. Max and Bea must then rescue the clueless Jiffie while avoiding the clutches of the snake cult. Note: Despite being mentioned in the episode, this is the only episode that Virgil and Norman did not appear. Based on: Mighty Max Conquers the Temple of Venom
4	4	"Day of the Cyclops"	S : Mark Zaslove and Randy Rogel; T : Elizabeth Stonecipher	Doug Murphy, Jeff Snow and Steve Lyons	September 22, 1993
Max and his mom travel to Turkey, where they are met by Virgil and Norman. Max's mom does not seem very surprised to see a walking, talking bird creature but refuses to believe that her son is some sort of super hero (she recognizes Virgil by name, so it is conceivable that Max has introduced his new friends to his mother between episodes and she has had some time to adjust). Max and Norman are arrested when Max is accused of stealing his cap from a vendor's stand. The seller has them both thrown into the local prison at gunpoint at which Max finally convinces Norman to stop beating up the police. Meanwhile Virgil and Max's mom must work together to recover the cap after the vendor sold it. In the prison, Max and Norman are accosted by a large hulking creature named Torlak who apparently wants to feed them to the Eye of Cyclops living in the caverns beneath the prison. As usual, adventures ensue and the day is saved. Based on: Mighty Max Outwits Cyclops
5	5	"Let Sleeping Dragons Lie!"	S : Mark Zaslove; S/T : Ken Pontac and David Bleiman	Dan Fausett and Yi-Chih Chen	October 6, 1993
Posing as the god Loki, Skullmaster convinces a Nordic sorcerer called Ravendark to awaken the sleeping Doom Dragon from its enchanted sleep. Virgil, Max and company do battle with the Dragon, during which Norman reveals that he was recognized as Thor in ancient times. Based on: Mighty Max Slays the Doom Dragon
6	6	"Rumble in the Jungle"	Jack Zurla and Mark Zaslove	Dan Fausett and Yi-Chih Chen	October 13, 1993
While on an expedition in the Congo, Max's mom uncovers and is captured by a lost civilization of talking gorillas who enslave primitive human beings. Max, Virgil, and Norman arrive and find the civilization. When they locate Max's mom, they are taken captive by the gorilla general and taken before the Ape King. Based on: Mighty Max Saves the Kingdom of Gargantua
7	7	"The Mother of All Adventures"	S : Mark Zaslove and Mike Fry; T : Steve Sustarsic and Robin Quinn	Steve Lyons, Don Manuel and Gary Hartle	October 20, 1993
Max's mom brings a figurine back from Haiti that turns out to be filled with zombie parasites. Based on: Mighty Max Neutralises Zomboid
8	8	"Norman's Conquest"	S : Mark Zaslove and Libby Hinson; T : Steve Sustarsic	Gary Graham and Brian Chin	October 27, 1993
Norman struggles with his fear of facing Spike, an old adversary of his family who murdered his father. Spike vowed ten thousand years ago to finish off Norman as well, and he intends to keep that promise. Guest starring Brad Garrett as the voice of Spike. Based on: Mighty Max Hammers Spike
9	9	"Less Than 20,000 Squid Heads Under the Sea"	S : Mark Zaslove; S/T : Jeremy Cushner	Gary Graham and Michael Swanigan	November 3, 1993
Max, Virgil, Norman, and a rich Texan travel underwater in a submarine to battle a giant octopus that is responsible for capturing and destroying ships. While underwater, the group encounters a squid civilisation. Based on: Mighty Max Caught by the Jaws of Doom
10	10	"Bring Me the Head of Mighty Max"	S : Mark Zaslove; S/T : Rob Hudnut	Steve Lyons, Michael Swanigan and Michael Bennett	November 10, 1993
Skullmaster uses the crystal of souls to awaken the former inhabitants of an ancient city to retrieve the cosmic cap from Max along with his head. When the zombies arrive Norman and Max decide to stand their ground, but Virgil urges that fighting is pointless and dangerous because the zombies are soulless and cannot be killed. His warnings are ignored, so Virgil escapes with the cap intending to destroy it to save both Max and Norman. Max and Norman remember that the cap is indestructible, but Virgil is willing to go so far as sacrificing himself for his friends.
11	11	"Werewolves of Dunneglen"	S : Mark Zaslove and John Cawley; T : Jeremy Cushner and Elizabeth Stonecipher	Jeff Snow, Gary Graham and Steve Lyons	November 17, 1993
Max, Virgil, and Norman travel to Scotland where there are reported sightings of werewolves. While there, Norman and Virgil are imprisoned as suspects and Max meets a man named Cameron who turns out to be a werewolf. Max and Cameron investigate and learn that a scientist named Professor MacDougal is stealing the blood of natural werewolves in an effort to turn herself into an even more powerful werewolf and steal their immortality in the process. Max and Cameron defeat MacDougal with the help of the other werewolves and Cameron takes his pack into the forest to live in peace. Based on: Mighty Max Hounds Werewolf
12	12	"Out in the Cold"	S : Mark Zaslove; T : Robin Quinn; S/T : Steve Sustarsic	Victor Del Chele, Jeff Snow and Gary Hartle	December 1, 1993
Space aliens take over a science station in the Arctic and assume the identities of its researchers. The aliens can only survive in freezing cold temperatures and plan to make the earth their new home by altering the entire planet's climate by creating a new ice age. It is up to Max, Norman, and Virgil to stop them, but matters are complicated when they learn that the aliens can disguise themselves as ordinary humans. Based on: Mighty Max Liquidates the Ice Alien
13	13	"The Maxnificent Seven"	S : Mark Zaslove; S/T : Ken Pontac	Yi-Chih Chen and Gary Graham	December 8, 1993
Max has been having nightmares about Skullmaster's zombie legions tracking him down, so Virgil suggests that they gather a band of heroes and enter Skull Mountain to destroy the Crystal of Souls. Max then travels to the four corners of the Earth gathering heroes (Hanuman, the monkey King, Beowulf, who slew the monstrous Grendel with his bare hands, Jonayaiyin, a Native American shaman, and Modjadji, an African warrior queen). This "maxnificent seven" enters Skull Mountain and battles an army of Skullmaster's monsters. From each of the heroes Max learns a lesson in bravery, then enters Skullmaster's inner sanctum alone and finds the courage to destroy the Crystal of Souls. The heroes make a last stand to enable Max, Norman and Virgil to escape. At the very end, Max is shown placing flowers near a cross with mementos from each hero on it, as a memorial.

=== Season 2 (1994) ===
No. overall	No. in season	Title	Written by	Original release date
14	1	"Pandora's Box, part 1"	S : Rob Hudnut; T : Doug Booth	September 22, 1994
With Skullmaster's Crystal of Souls broken, the former ruler of the Earth's core Lava Lord is released from his prison. He plans to retake his kingdom from Skullmaster with a giant robot called Magus. Meanwhile, Max is getting tired of never being able to have fun because of his duties as the Mighty One. Virgil agrees that he can give up saving the world if he goes on one last quest to strike at Skullmaster while he is weakened. Once in the underworld, Virgil is captured by Skullmaster's minions. Because of a prophecy that they are destined to die together, he attempts to forge an alliance with the fowl. Based on: Mighty Max Blasts Magus
15	2	"Pandora's Box, part 2"	S : Rob Hudnut; T : Doug Booth	September 23, 1994
Lava Lord meets Skullmaster's forces with Magus, but thanks to Virgil's tactical advice Lava Lord is knocked out of his robot, which allows Max and Norman to hijack it. They head to Skull Mountain to get to the bottom of Virgil's betrayal. Although suspicious of Virgil at first, Max realizes that his partnership with Skullmaster was a complex ploy to let Max get his hands on Magus. Skullmaster, however, uses Virgil as a shield, and Max refuses to kill Skullmaster at the cost of Virgil's life. Instead, he allows Skullmaster and Warmonger to escape to the Earth's surface with them.
16	3	"Blood of the Dragon"	Richard Mueller	September 26, 1994
After being released from his inner earth prison, Skullmaster travels to Malananuka the Dragon Isle where he preys on and deceives some of the native inhabitants into drinking dragon's blood. This transforms them into reptilian humanoid Zilards that become mindless slaves obedient to his commands. Max, Virgil, and Norman head to the island to stop him and encounter a young native who is stuck in mid transformation because he did not fully drink the dragon's blood and was previously found by a circus. Together they attempt to rescue the rest of the natives who have not drank the blood of the dragon while contending with Skullmaster, Warmonger, the Zilards, and a giant dragon whose wingbeats move Malananuka. Based on: Mighty Max Storms Dragon Island
17	4	"The Missing Linked"	Elliot Feldman	September 27, 1994
The citizens of the town of Schlepak are disappearing. Max, Virgil, and Norman investigate when a young girl informs them that a monstrous creature has captured her brother. They discover that a mad scientist who, having been ignored by the townspeople for his entire life, has created a slime creature called Corpus which devour metal and human beings. After Norman is consumed, Max and Virgil set out to defeat the scientist and rescue the townspeople. As a running joke through the episode, the name of the scientist is never revealed. Every time he attempts to disclose it, something interrupts him. 'Based on: Mighty Max Survives Corpus
18	5	"Year of the Rat"	Christy Marx and Katherine Lawrence	September 28, 1994
The ancient Emperor of Rats, Lao Chu, has been freed from his spiritual prison, possessing the body of Ki Wan, the historian who freed him. Max must now find a way to stop the evil creature's plan of a rat-dominated world. The complex puzzles of Lao Chu's temple may present a challenge to even the mathematically precise Virgil. Based on: Mighty Max Traps Rattus
19	6	"The Cyberskull Virus"	S : Gordon Bressack; T : Ted Pedersen and Francis Moss	September 29, 1994
Max plays a videogame called "Dementoids", and is called to investigate a sighting of a giant digital monster like one from the game. They find that a villain called Cyberskull is responsible, and he has created a virus that can turn the real world into a digital horror zone. Max pits his skill at the "Dementoids" game to use against Cyberskull, and ultimately manages to destroy the virus, returning the world to normal and trapping the Cyberskull in cyberspace. Based on: Mighty Max Bytes CyberSkull
20	7	"Zygote's Rhythm"	Craig Miller and Gordon Bressack	September 30, 1994
Max and his iguana Thor join Virgil and Norman to investigate an island full of "dinosaurs". Instead they find that an evil scientist on the island, Dr. Zygote, has invented a way to "de-evolve" modern animals. After Zygote turns Thor into an enormous prehistoric lizard, Max confronts the twisted genius and turns his own evolution ray on him. Set to evolve instead of de-evolve, the ray turns Zygote into a hideous floating creature with an enormous brain. Out of control, the scientist crashes through his observation dome and dives into the sea below. A satisfied Max then uses the ray to revert the animals back to normal, including his beloved Thor. Based on: Mighty Max Blows Up Mutasaurus
21	8	"Along Came Arachnoid"	Bruce & Reed Shelly	October 3, 1994
Norman must face one of his few fears - spiders - when Max and company find themselves confronting a mutated scientist obsessed with spiders. Determined to stop Max and crew, the scientist (calling himself "Doctor Arachnoid") releases a two-story tall spider on them. Max figures that the only way he can make Norman face the spider is to place himself in the creature's path, forcing the Guardian to defend him. Based on: Mighty Max Trapped by Arachnoid
22	9	"The Axeman Cometh"	S : Gordon Bressack; S/T : Richard Mueller	October 4, 1994
As Canadian lumberjacks cut down a redwood in the forest, they unwittingly free Lokjar, the ancient demon of violence. Lokjar cuts a bloody path of destruction to find his magic axe and key to his indestructible face mask that binds his terrible powers. Mighty Max and friends races to find the items first but Norman who faced the immortal demon in the past is determined to destroy him instead. Max must talk some sense to Norman before Lokjar is freed from his bonds. Based on: Mighty Max Tangles With Lockjaw
23	10	"Beetlemania"	S : Gordon Bressack; T : Jules Dennis	October 5, 1994
Max, Bea, Virgil and Norman discover that what appears to be an invasion of beetles, accompanied by a giant beetle-like monster, are actually space aliens. Based on: Mighty Max Zaps Beetlebrow
24	11	"Souls of Talon"	S : Gordon Bressack; S/T : Elizabeth Stonecipher	October 6, 1994
Talon, a sentient skull carried about by an enormous bird, attempts to escape the astral plane but the guardian of the only portal out refuses to admit anyone but the cap-bearer. Talon's bird claws at the gate, causing natural disasters in the real world. When Max and the others investigate Max disregards warnings from Virgil not to enter a portal to the astral plane and finds himself pursued by Talon. Talon steals his cap, allowing him to escape and begin stealing souls from Manhattan, but Max manages to return by convincing the gatekeeper that even without the cap, he is still the cap-bearer. Talon seems unstoppable, but while on the astral plane Max found the disc that is the source of Talon's immortality, and traps him on the astral plane again by tossing the disc through the portal. Based on: Mighty Max Crushes Talon
25	12	"Tar Wars"	S : Gordon Bressack; T : Steve Sustarsic and Robin Quinn	October 7, 1994
Max and his mom visit the La Brea Tar Pits where they encounter a caveman named Gor and a sabertooth tiger who are destined to fight for eternity ever since both of them were exposed to a radioactive meteorite. Guest starring Ron Perlman as the voice of Gor. Based on: Mighty Max Grapples with Hellcat
26	13	"Clown Without Pity"	Mark Zaslove	November 14, 1994
Max, Norman and Virgil find themselves in a circus inhabited by a clown Freako. They learn that Freako, who was born with a permanent clown's face, is now out for revenge by capturing kids and turning them into sideshow-like mutants. Based on: Mighty Max Out-Freaks Freako
27	14	"Max vs. Max"	S : Gordon Bressack; S/T : Doug Booth	November 15, 1994
Another boy by the name of Maximillion is discovered by Virgil as a potential chosen one. With the prophecy being unclear as to which one is the true cap bearer, the two compete in a competition of heroic deeds in order to prove their value. Meanwhile Skullmaster works on infiltrating an ancient city in order to get a hold of the Lemurian Arcana, the most powerful book of spells in the world. Maximillion is revealed to be a spy of Skullmaster designed to get a hold of the cosmic cap in order to activate the portal into the city. Virgil eventually reveals that he moved the book 5,000 years ago at the time of Skullmaster's imprisonment, and is coerced into revealing its location in exchange for Max's life. Skullmaster, now with the book, leaves through a portal provided by Maximillion. Before Maximillion can go through, he is tackled by Max who manages to steal away the necklace that was controlling him. With Virgil now furious at Max for allowing Skullmaster to have everything he needs to conquer the world, Max reveals that he ripped out several pages from the Arcana while Skullmaster had a hold of him. Skullmaster is furious that his victory is only bittersweet as he only has half of the book and no cosmic cap in his possession.
28	15	"Cyberskull II: The Next Level"	S : Gordon Bressack; T : Ted Pedersen and Francis Moss	November 16, 1994
Cyberskull is back and this time he seeks to create a physical body for himself.
29	16	"Fuath and Beggora"	Charles Howell	November 17, 1994
Mighty Max is summoned to Ireland to stop an evil beyond imagination from being unleashed. Max, Norman, Virgil meet a young villager named Katlin and discover that Katlin's father leads a secret sect of Druids who plan to awaken Fuath, a clockwork stone giant to conquer the world as revenge for humanity rejecting their dominion. When Fuath proves to be uncontrollable and goes on a rampage, Max must uncover the secret of what powers Fuath and put a stop to it once and for all. Based on: Mighty Max Shatters Gargoyle
30	17	"Dawn of the Conqueror"	S : Gordon Bressack; T : Mark Seidenberg	November 18, 1994
Norman must do battle with a lion-headed warrior known as "The Conqueror" from dawn till dusk in order to extend his life for another 10,000 years. In preparation for the lethal contest, Norman bids Max and Virgil farewell as he feels he must do this task alone. Max determines not to let Norman take on this fight alone, and must retrace his steps from memory through various portals in order to reunite with his companions in Greece. Based on: Mighty Max Defeats the Conqueror
31	18	"Scorpio Rising"	S : Gordon Bressack; T : Richard Mueller	November 21, 1994
Strange radiation readings in the desert outside of Las Vegas, Nevada bring Max and company to the area. In caverns nearby, they find a crazed nuclear scientist who plans to use giant mutated scorpions and his own natural immunity to radiation as a means to take revenge on those who caused his condition. He believes that the world itself needs to be cleansed by "pure, beautiful" radiation. Based on: Mighty Max Stings Scorpio
32	19	"Zygote Music"	S : Gordon Bressack; T : Bruce & Reed Shelly	November 22, 1994
Dr. Zygote returns in his evolved form, but over the past time since their last encounter, has learned to use many of his psychic powers. In his continuing quest for evolution, he abducts a young boy who has the ability of telekinesis, and attempts to use his genetic material to further advance his own evolutionary state. The abduction of the young boy alerts Virgil and Norman who then meet up with Max in order to track down the missing boy. Based on: Dr. Zygote (Shrunken Head)
33	20	"Good Golly Ms. Kali"	Katherine Lawrence and Christy Marx	November 23, 1994
A man revives the serpent demon Naja, who begins gathering the pieces of an idol of Kali, the Hindu goddess of death and destruction, to revive her as well. Max and the gang try to stop him, along the way picking up pieces of an idol of the god Shiva. Naja manages to summon and enslave Kali, but Max is able to assume Shiva's powers and release Kali, who kills Naja before returning with Shiva's spirit to their home. Based on: Mighty Max Strikes Fang
34	21	"Around the World in Eighty Arms"	Mark Zaslove	November 24, 1994
Max finds himself working with Jules Verne after the legendary author and scientist's multi-tentacled submarine - the Nautilus - is stolen by a band of pirates led by none other than Nemo himself. Verne, having slept in a cryogenic chamber for years, found himself facing the grandson of the pirate captain made infamous in his book Twenty Thousand Leagues Under the Seas. The younger Nemo claimed the Nautilus as his family's own, and planned to use it to dominate the shipping lanes and recapture the former glory of his family's name. Based on: Mighty Max Sinks Nautilus
35	22	"Fly by Night"	S : Gordon Bressack; T : Jules Dennis	November 25, 1994
Max, Norman, and Virgil head to London to investigate a sudden string of attacks where victims are being drained of blood. Virgil insists that a vampire is on the prowl and that the only way to stop it is the use of traditional folklore and tools to slay it. When they encounter Countess Moska, a vampire that displays fly-like qualities unheard of the bloodsuckers of legend, Max must discover a new way to stop Moska's reign of terror before she unleashes a new generation of vampires. Guest starring JoBeth Williams as the voice of Countess Moska. Based on: Mighty Max Squishes Fly
36	23	"The Mommy's Hand"	Gordon Bressack and Charles Howell	November 28, 1994
Max's mom again finds herself in danger when a ring placed on her hand compels her to go to Egypt. Following out of concern, Max and company find that the ring belongs to Isis, an ancient Egyptian goddess who has been living among humans for a few thousand years. Now a little unhinged, she is attempting to awaken her husband Osiris hoping that he will destroy the human race for its many faults and injustices, but Osiris spares humanity after learning that Max is the "Chosen One" and departs along with his wife. Guest starring Kate Mulgrew as the voice of Isis. Based on: Mighty Max Grips the Hand
37	24	"I, Warmonger"	S : Gordon Bressack; T : Doug Booth	November 29, 1994
Skullmaster and Warmonger travel to "Zero Island" off the western coast of Africa in order to offset the balance of nature by disturbing the ancient Hydra, a monster with two heads: one representing light and the other dark who keeps in balance the good and evil power of nature. Using some of the magic of the Lemurian Arcana, Skullmaster causes the balance in Hydra to tip in favor of darkness, but Warmonger takes this chance to betray Skullmaster by keeping the page of control from the book for himself and orders Hydra to destroy Skullmaster. Max, Virgil, and Norman show up in time to realize what is happening and attempt to protect Skullmaster out of fear that it will disrupt the prophecy since Max is destined to defeat Skullmaster. They fail to protect Skullmaster who is seemingly killed and Max is forced to use the most powerful page that they had obtained from the Arcana in order to put the light energy of Hydra back in balance. The island sinks as a result and Warmonger escapes only to find out that Skullmaster had arranged all this to force Max to use his page of the Arcana, the one thing he feared most. Skullmaster promises that Warmonger will be rewarded for his loyalty later on. Based on: Mighty Max Head to Head With Hydra
38	25	"Sirius Trouble"	S : Gordon Bressack; T : Mark Seidenberg	November 30, 1994
Aliens from a planet orbiting Sirius come to Earth, and while trying to stop them Max unwittingly starts a heated argument between Norman and Virgil that keeps them from working together through the entire episode. Max finally gets them to settle the dispute and work together. Aboard the aliens' ship, Max finds out that they have been stealing toxic waste, a source of fuel for them, and happily let the aliens go on their way with it. Based on: Mighty Max Takes On Terror Talons
39	26	"Armageddon Closer"	S : Rob Hudnut; S/T : Gordon Bressack	December 1, 1994
Max's birthday falls on the winter solstice, the day that is filled with the most darkness. Having now reforged his Crystal of Souls and filled it with the souls of the Zilards of Malananuka the Dragon Isle, Skullmaster now puts in to play his final plan for victory he has been working towards ever since his escape from Skull Mountain. Virgil and Norman show up at Max's birthday party to show him the prophecy in their home in the Himalayas Mountains. There, they reveal to him that the Prophecy is a set of murals that have been predicting the future based on current events and it now shows that Skullmaster is ready to begin his conquest of the world. Skullmaster and Warmonger launch a surprise attack on the three in their home leaving them with no choice but to run. As they are running, Virgil informs Max that they must evade Skullmaster until after the Winter Solstice or else Skullmaster will win. As they flee from portal to portal, they encounter previously defeated monsters Eye of Cyclops controlling the Cyclops skeleton and Cyberskull who were revived by and under Skullmaster's control. Eventually, they encounter Arachnoid's giant mutated spider they had previously fought and Norman had a fear against as this time Norman realizes that his destiny is about to conclude.
40	27	"Armageddon Outta Here"	S : Rob Hudnut; S/T : Gordon Bressack	December 2, 1994
In order to buy Max and Virgil time to escape, Norman engages Arachnoid's mutated spider in battle realizing that the time of his destiny has come. Max resists leaving Norman to die, but Virgil forces him to flee explaining to him that this moment was foretold on by the prophecy; the mural in their home. After fleeing, Max is furious that Virgil let Norman die upon which Virgil explains that each person's end is foretold and that Virgil's end will be at Stonehenge, a place Max must avoid until after the solstice. Skullmaster and Warmonger show up again, and in order to save Max, Virgil sends him to the Astral Plane, the one place Skullmaster cannot follow. Skullmaster abducts Virgil and takes him to Stonehenge while relaying a message to Max through Talon (the monster in the Astral Plane) that if he fails to show up, he will kill Virgil. Desperate for help, Max heads to Skull Mountain to recruit Lava Lord's help in getting revenge on Skullmaster. Lava Lord takes his new and improved Magus to Stonehenge with Max. Skullmaster summons Fuath to battle with Lava Lord and Magus while Max attempts to save Virgil. After Fuath is defeated, Skullmaster overcomes Lava Lord and Magus with the power of the Crystal of Souls and then demands that Max hand over the cosmic cap in exchange for Virgil's life. Max agrees over Virgil's protests, upon which Skullmaster kills Virgil and orders Warmonger to restrain Max while he explains what is about to happen. Now with the Cosmic Cap (which changes into a cosmic crown) and Crystal of Souls, Skullmaster stands in the center of Stonehenge, where he absorbs the powers of time itself on the sunset of the winter solstice and gains the ability to rewrite the past, present, and future. When Warmonger asks for his own reward, Skullmaster repays his loyalty by killing him as well. Now free, Max grabs hold of the staff with the Crystal of Souls. Using his connection with the cap, Max is able to partially absorb the energy as well and uses it to reverse time back to when he first got the cap. Now back at the beginning, he realizes that he is reliving the past and decides that this time around he is going to ensure he fulfills his destiny.

== Voice cast ==
- Rob Paulsen as Max, Alien Leader (in "Sirius Trouble"), Kali Worshipper (in "Good Golly Ms. Kali")
- Tony Jay as Virgil, Witch Doctor (in "The Mother of All Inventions"), Norman's Dad (in "Norman's Conquest"), Cameron (in "Werewolves of Dunneglen")
- Richard Moll as Norman
- Tim Curry as Skullmaster, Jules Verne (in "Around the World in Eighty Arms")
- Corey Burton as Felix, Osiris (in "The Mommy's Hand")
- Tress MacNeille as Max's Mother
- Kath Soucie as Bea
- Frank Welker as Warmonger, Lava Lord, Venom (in "Snakes and Laddies"), Torlak (in "Day of the Cyclops"), Gorilla General (in "Rumble in the Jungle"), Escaped Scientist (in "Out in the Cold"), Danish Referee (in "The Maxnificent Seven")

=== Additional voices ===
- Charlie Adler as Ernie (in "The Brain Sucker's Cometh"), Football Coach (in "The Brain Sucker's Cometh"), Calimarus (in "Less Than 20,000 Squid Heads Under the Sea")
- René Auberjonois as Arachnoid (in "Along Came Arachnoid", "The Mommy's Hand"), Nadja (in "Good Golly Ms. Kali")
- Michael Bell as Hydra's Good Side (in "I, Warmonger")
- Hamilton Camp as Additional voices (in "Fly By Night")
- Christopher Carter as Gage (in "Zygote Rhythm")
- Glen Chin as Lao Chu/Ki Wan (in "Year of the Rat")
- Selette Cole as Additional voices (in "Zygote Rhythm")
- Jim Cummings as Ravendark (in "Let Sleeping Dragons Lie"), Doom Dragon (in "Let Sleeping Dragons Lie"), Ape King (in "Rumble in the Jungle"), J. "Ollie" Oleander Pettybone (in "Less Than 20,000 Squid Heads Under the Sea"), Beowulf (in "The Maxnificent Seven"), Conqueror (in "Dawn of the Conqueror")
- Miriam Flynn as Professor MacDougal (in "Werewolves of Dunneglen")
- Brad Garrett as Spike (in "Norman's Conquest"), Gatekeeper (in "Souls of Talon")
- Linda Gary as Kali (in "Good Golly Ms. Kali")
- Ellen Gerstell as Sarah (in "The Missed Link"), Flight Attendant (in "I, Warmonger"), Lithuanian Circus Performer (in "I, Warmonger")
- Danny Goldman as Marlin Curt/Cyberskull (in "Cyberskull Virus", "Cyberskull II: The Next Level")
- Dorian Harewood as Osirus (in "The Mommy's Hand"), Nahmo (in "Sirius Trouble")
- Michael Horse as Yana-Ya-In (in "The Maxnificent Seven")
- Charles Kimbrough as Dr. Robert Scorpio (in "Scorpio Rising")
- Clyde Kusatsu as Hanuman
- Katie Leigh as Jiffy (in "Snakes and Laddies")
- Victor Love as Additional voice (in "Zygote's Music")
- Kenneth Mars as Professor Eggbert Zygote (in "Zygote's Rhythm", "Zygote Music")
- Jason Marsden as Young Norman (in "Norman's Conquest")
- Kate Mulgrew as Isis (in "The Mommy's Hand")
- Ron Perlman as Goar (in "Tar Wars")
- Henry Polic II as Nemo (in "Around the World in Eighty Arms")
- Roger Rees as Additional voices (in "Around the World in Eighty Arms")
- Neil Ross as Hydra's Bad Side (in "I, Warmonger"), Additional voices (in "Cyberskull Virus")
- Michael Fenton Stevens
- Paula Tiso as Caitlin (in "Fuath and Begorra")
- B.J. Ward as Security System (in "Cyberskull II: The Next Level"), Mrs. Fudder (in "Fly By Night"), Additional voices (in "Cyberskull Virus")
- David Warner as Talon (in "Souls of Talon")
- Olivia Virgil White as Mujaji (in "The Maxnificent Seven")
- Paul Williams as Mad Scientist
- JoBeth Williams as Countess Moska (in "Fly By Night")

== Crew ==
- Gordon Hunt – voice director
- Phil Roman – executive producer
- Mark Zaslove – story editor (season 1)
- Gordon Bressack – story editor (season 2)

== Broadcast ==
The series originally aired in syndication as part of a children's block titled Amazin' Adventures, premiering on September 1, 1993 and ending on December 2, 1994 with a total of 40 episodes over the course of 2 seasons.

== Home media ==
Select episodes of the show were released on VHS in NTSC and PAL formats.

== Merchandise ==
The merchandising was far more popular than the show itself. Mighty Max toys were sold as play-sets of varying sizes with very small (usually non-articulated) figurines inside. Each play-set contained a Mighty Max figure as well as one or more villains and sometimes Virgil, Norman, or both. There were a small series of larger, more expensive play-sets with various mechanical and electronic features such as opening jaws (on an island play-set shaped as a dragon's head) and lights. Almost all episodes of the TV series were based at least loosely on one of the Mighty Max play-sets.

In 1994, due to the popularity of the play-sets at the time, the McDonald's Happy Meal offered a toy play-set featuring Mighty Max.

In 1994, a video game, The Adventures of Mighty Max, was released for the SNES and Sega Genesis/Mega Drive (which were packaged with a VHS copy of Day of the Cyclops and Let Sleeping Dragons Lie, respectively). A handheld game was also released by Tiger Electronics and Systema.

The show generated other merchandise such as a comic book (10 issues), a sticker album, at least one puzzle, and board games. In some countries, replicas of Max's cap were sold, although not all are officially licensed merchandise.
