= Peter Pan Playthings Ltd =

Former British toy manufacturer

Peter Pan Playthings Ltd.
- Industry: Toys and games
- Founded: 1963
- Fate: Acquired 1987 by Bluebird Toys
- Headquarters: Peterborough, United Kingdom
- Key people: Bob Holden, Gareth Morris, Tom Charnock
- Products: Board games

Peter Pan Playthings Ltd was a British toy company founded in 1963. It bought Salter Science and other assets from the receivers of Thomas Salter Ltd. In 1972 the company reported a £80,000 profit. The following year it was acquired by Berwick Timpo.

The company was sold on to Bluebird Toys in 1987, which continued to use the Peter Pan Playthings brand for several years.

== Products ==
- Anti-Monopoly (under license from Waddingtons)
- Backfire!
- Blow football
- Captain Scarlet and the Mysterons Adventure Game
- Chemistry in Action
- Chinese Chess
- Clash
- Clobber
- Cross Over the Bridge
- Frustration (board game)
- Ginny-O
- Headache
- Master Challenge
- Mr. Potato Head (British version)
- Musical books
- Othello (game)
- Plasticine, following acquisition of Harbutt’s Plasticine Ltd
- Police Patrol
- QED Puzzle Set Squares
- Side Track
- Take the Test
- Thunderbirds to the Rescue Marble Maze
- Thunderbirds International Rescue Game
- Thinkominoes
- Tile Poker
- Tough Luck!
- Triominoes
- Trivia-Challenge
