= Mighty Max (toyline) =

British series of toys (1992-1996)

- "Mighty Max Conquers the Temple of Venom" opened
- Product type: Toys
- Current owner: Mattel
- Country: United Kingdom
- Introduced: 1992
- Discontinued: 1996; 30 years ago
- Related brands: Polly Pocket
- Previous owners: Bluebird Toys

Mighty Max was a series of toys that were manufactured by Bluebird Toys PLC in the UK in 1992. The toys were similar to the earlier Polly Pocket toyline, but these toys were marketed primarily towards young boys. In Canada and the United States, they were distributed by Irwin Toy Limited and Mattel respectively.

The original toyline consisted mainly of "Doom Zones" and "Horror Heads". "Doom Zones" were small playsets with a horror theme and featured miniature figurines of menacing creatures and the hero Max, a young boy with blond hair, jeans, a white t-shirt with a red "M" on it, and a baseball cap (the color varied based on the playset purchased). The "Horror Heads" were smaller-sized playsets, also shaped like the heads of creatures and contained miniature figures. It was later adapted into a TV series, as well as a tie-in video game The Adventures of Mighty Max produced by Ocean Software for the Super NES and Mega Drive/Genesis.

== Story ==
The background story of the toys was as follows:

Max's dad left him his old baseball cap. Trouble was, this was no ordinary baseball cap..."Gotta look the business" Max thought as he tweaked the cap's peak round to the side. "AAAARGH!" Suddenly, the world had gone weird and very unfriendly! The cap had changed colour! Something very strange was going on! He'd been caught in the Horror Zone. Stumbling from one terrifying adventure to another with only cryptic clues to help him escape...he was all alone. He was scared. But he was MIGHTY MAX, and he'd get back somehow!

== Television series ==
Premiering in September 1993, an American animated series based on the toys was produced. After the series began to air the characters Virgil and Norman and toys based on episodes of the series were added to the toyline to form a new series. The story on the packaging was revised accordingly and a short-lived comic book series by Marvel UK was created as well. The appearance of Mighty Max changed considerably; Max was no longer portrayed as a young kid but as a young teenager with a long blonde hair, blue jeans, a red cap, and a white t-shirt similar to his portrayal in the television series. The older Doom Zones, Horror Heads and playsets were re-released with the original story replaced with the revised one:

Max was bright and pretty good at getting in and out of trouble, but he'd never forget the day he broke his Mom's mysterious old statue and found the Cosmic Cap inside. How was he to know it made him 'the Mighty One', able to travel instantly from place to place by means of time Portals? And how were Max, his Cosmic Cap and his two friends and protectors, wise old Virgil and fearless Norman gonna' measure up against the ultimate evil of the Skull Master!!?

== Toys ==
Some of the toys featured a short comic on the back of the packaging summarizing Max's adventure in that zone. Most of the short comics feature roughly 10 panels.

=== Doom Zones ===
By far the most popular and recognisable range, the medium-sized Doom Zones usually contained around three to four set-exclusive figures along with a standard Max figure. Some playsets from the third series (particularly Cyberskull, Lizard and Nautilus) are relatively uncommon but the rest were all very widely produced. The original six playsets in Series 1 were later repackaged with a bonus Norman figure, and the six playsets in Series 2 were later repackaged with a bonus Hairy/Dread Head.

Series 1

- Mighty Max Slays the Doom Dragon - contains the figures of Max, Ravendark and the Doom Dragon.
- Mighty Max Trapped by Arachnoid - contains the figures of Max, Arachnoid, and the Creep.
- Mighty Max Terminates Wolfship 7 - contains the figures of Max, Lord Lupor, an Evil Alien Lieutenant, and an escape pod.
- Mighty Max Liquidates the Ice Alien - contains the figures of Max, the Cryogenoid, the Iceosaurus, and two alien heads.
- Mighty Max Escapes from Skull Dungeon - contains the figures of Max, Dr. Gore, and Smasher.
- Mighty Max Conquers the Temple of Venom (renamed to Conquers the Palace of Poison in North America) - contains the figures of Max, Mummy King Venom, and a giant scorpion.

Series 2

- Mighty Max Saves the Kingdom of Gargantua (renamed Tangles With the Ape King in North America) - contains the figures of Max, the Ape King, and Zantar.
- Mighty Max Grapples with Hellcat (renamed Grapples With Battle Cat in North America) - contains the figures of Max, Gor the Caveman, and a mastodon.
- Mighty Max Outwits Cyclops - contains the figures of Max, the Vile Torturter, and the Eye of Cyclops.
- Mighty Max Stings Scorpion (renamed Stings Scorpio in South Africa) - contains the figures of Max, Scorpion, and Scorpobot.
- Mighty Max Blows Up Mutasaurus (renamed Blows Up Dino Lab in North America) - contains the figures of Max, Professor Zygote, a Pterodactyl, and a Raptor.
- Mighty Max Caught in the Jaws of Doom (renamed Caught by the Man-Eater in North America) - contains the figures of Max, Dr. Kalamarus, a manta ray, and two attack squids.

Series 3

- Mighty Max Sinks the Nautilus (also known as Sea Slug) - contains the figures of Max, Captain Nemo, a Poseidon beast, and a Neptune trawler.
- Mighty Max Bytes Cyberskull (also known as Cyro-Skull) - contains the figures of Max, Cyber Surfer, Brain-Source, and a virtual vehicle.
- Mighty Max Squishes Fly - contains the figures of Max, Fly, Drax, and a maggot scavenger vehicle.
- Mighty Max Traps Rattus - contains the figures of Max, Rattus, the Arak Nid, and a sewer plague vehicle.
- Mighty Max Lashes Lizard (also known as Lashes Geela Guts) - contains the figures of Max, the Parasite Prince, and the Ulcer Monster.
- Mighty Max Grips the Hand (also known as Crushes the Hand) - contains the figures of Max, Lignin, and a corpse.

=== Horror Heads ===
Essentially serving as smaller versions of Doom Zones, the Horror Heads usually contained around two set-exclusive figures along with a standard Max figure. Some playsets from the third series (specifically Beetlebrow, Talon, Rhesus 4 and Freako) are all relatively uncommon but the rest were all widely produced.

Series 1

- Mighty Max Against Droid Invader (renamed to Mighty Max Against Robot Invader in the USA) - contains the figures of Max, an android, and Master Brain.
- Mighty Max Battles Skull Warrior - contains the figures of Max, Skull Warrior, and a space surfer.
- Mighty Max Challenges Lava Beast - contains the figures of Max, Lava Beast the Energoid, and a lava beetle.
- Mighty Max Defeats Nightwing (renamed to Mighty Max Defeats Vamp Biter in the USA) - contains the figures of Max and Nightwing.
- Mighty Max Fights Nuke Ranger - contains the figures of Max, Nuke Ranger, and a hover pod.
- Mighty Max Neutralises Zomboid - contains the figures of Max, Zomboid, and Sluggon.
- Mighty Max Pulverizes Sea Squirm - contains the figures of Max, Krillor, and a sea serpent.
- Mighty Max Versus Kronosaur - contains the figures of Max, Cave Man, and Steggy.

Series 2

- Mighty Max Hammers Spike (renamed Mighty Max Hammers Ax Man in North America) - contains the figures of Max and Ax Man.
- Mighty Max Hounds Werewolf - contains the figures of Max and two Horror Hounds.
- Mighty Max Survives Corpus - contains the figures of Max, Mort the Gravedigger, and a corpse.
- Mighty Max Tangles With Lockjaw - contains the figures of Max and Big Red the Lumberjack.

Series 3

- Mighty Max Zaps Beetlebrow -
- Mighty Max Crushes Talon (renamed Mighty Max Crushes Clawber in North America) - contains the figures of Max, a carrion vulture, and a soul-sucker leech.
- Mighty Max Out-Freaks Freako - contains the figures of Max, Boris, and Grovel.
- Mighty Max Rams Rhesus 4 (renamed Mighty Max Rams Hydron in North America) - contains the figures of Max, Hydron, and a ramming vehicle.

=== Monster Heads ===
The Monster Heads were playsets that were considerably smaller than even the Horror Heads, and did not actually open up. They each came with one set-exclusive monster figure (referenced in the name of the set - for example, the Zombie Commando Monster Head came with the Jack Knife monster) and a Max figure unique to that playset.

- Zombie Commando and Jack Knife
- Mecha Crawler and Octo-Slime
- Gorillabat and Ape Warrior
- Imperial Dragon and Samurai Serpent
- Phantasm and Dr. Destiny
- Basilisk and Zilard Beast

=== Hairy Heads (also known as Dread Heads) ===
The Hairy Heads were playsets that were really more accessories, heads with openable mouths that possessed a hinge on the back to be used to stand the head upright or attached to an object such as a school bag. They all had fuzzy hair on the top of their heads, hence the name Hairy Heads, and an included random Max figure could fit inside the mouth. Hairy Heads were only released on single cardbacks in the UK and Europe (where they were known as Scalps). In the US, they were called Dread Heads and released as bonuses with Doom Zones.

- Hemlock
- Karbon
- Anthrax 9
- Razorback (also known as Razor)
- Garrotid
- Eruptus (also known as Ruptus)
- Berserker (also known as Serker)
- Skullcrusher

=== Shrunken Heads ===
The extremely small Shrunken Heads were fully openable, unlike the slightly bigger Monster Heads, but only came with an exclusive Max figure and no detachable monster figure to fight - instead simply an embossed decoration set against the interior of the set. The first eight sets were based on original creatures, while the remaining eight were based on episodes of the cartoon. The first eight originally came packaged in sets of two but later were released on separate cards by themselves. They were also available as cereal box prizes in some regions. This is why the first eight are relatively common, unlike the later eight which were released in much smaller numbers and are some of the rarest and sought-after sets within the series despite their small size.

Series 1

- Bloodsucker (renamed Insectoid in North America)
- Lobotix (renamed Brainface in North America)
- Pharaoh's Curse (renamed Mummy King in North America)
- Venom (renamed Wraptile in North America)
- Rat Trap
- Meltdown (renamed Head Case in North America)
- Rok Monster
- Vampyre

Series 2

- Skull Master
- Dr. Zygote
- Fang
- Conqueror
- Gargoyle
- Necrosaur
- Lava Lord
- Doom

=== Battle Warriors ===
These were action figures which transformed into small playsets, based on the same principle as the Mighty Max Blasts Magus playset but on a much smaller scale.

- Challenge #1 - Battle Conqueror (also known as Mighty Max Defeats the Conqueror) - contains the figures of Max, Virgil, and Norman.
- Challenge #2 - Double Demon (also known as Mighty Max Head to Head With Hydra) - contains the figures of Max and Skullmaster.
- Challenge #3 - Lava Beast (also known as Mighty Max Melts Lava Beast) - contains the figures of Max and Lava Lord.
- Challenge #4 - Pharaoh Phang (also known as Mighty Max Strikes Fang) - contains the figure of Max.
- Challenge #5 - Medi-Evil Mauler (also known as Mighty Max Shatters Gargoyle) - contains the figures of Max, Basilisk, and the Stone Dragon.
- Challenge #6 - Megahert (also known as Mighty Max Shuts Down Cybot) - contains the figures of Max, Cyberskull, and a Cybot.

=== Large-size playsets ===
Several larger Mighty Max playsets were released across the years, often being significantly less portable in nature but coming with an increased figure count and more playability.

Mighty Max Defies the Dread Star and Mighty Max Takes On Terror Talons are in fact the same playset, but came boxed differently and with different pieces. For instance, Dread Star featured a total of six alien villains, plus a "Skelemonster Robot" and a "Scavenger Vehicle". Terror Talons meanwhile had only five aliens, and no Scavenger Vehicle.

- Mighty Max Blasts Magus - contains the figures of Max, Virgil, Norman, Lava Lord, and a lava beast.
- Mighty Max Takes On Terror Talons
- Mighty Max Defies the Dread Star - another version of "Mighty Max Takes On Terror Talons" that has more figures.
- Mighty Max Storms Dragon Island - contains the figures of Max, Virgil, Norman, Skullmaster, a Necrosaur, the Zilard Overlord, a Zilard Mutant Warrior, and the Lagoon Monster.
- Mighty Max Trapped In Skull Mountain - contains the figures of Max, Skullmaster, Warmonger, a rock monster, a giant crab, and a double-headed dragon.
- Mighty Max Assaults Skull Master Mega Head

=== Heroes and villains ===
A total of six figure sets were released, each including Max, Norman, Virgil and various villains and monsters. The first three were simply repaints of pre-existing figures that came with recent Doom Zones and Horror Heads as well as from a few of the bigger playsets. The second three, however, were all-new figures done in the style of the cartoon.

- Featuring Skull Master - contains the figures of Max, Norman, Virgil, Skullmaster, Arachnoid (referred to as "Arachnoid Monster"), Skull Warrior (referred to as "Evil Warrior"), and a Wolfship Alien.
- Featuring Lava Lord - contains the figures of Mighty Max, Norman, Virgil, Lava Lord, Mummy King Venom (referred to as a "mummy"), the Vile Torturer (referred to as a "goblin"), and a rock monster.
- Featuring Warmonger - contains the figures of Mighty Max, Norman, Virgil, Warmonger, Ravendark (referred to as "Necromancer"), Smasher (referred to as "Frankenstein's monster"), and Gor the Caveman (referred to as "Caveman")
- Featuring Battle Conqueror - contains the figures of Max, Norman, Virgil, Conqueror, Warmonger, Doom, and a rock monster. This was also called "Max Battle the Barbarians".
- Featuring Medi-Evil Mauler - contains the figures of Max, Norman, Virgil, Lava Lord, Gargoyle, Hydra, and Cyberskull. This was also called "Max Battle the Marauders".
- Featuring Pharaoh Phang - contains the figures of Max, Norman, Virgil, Skullmaster, Professor Zygote, Pharaoh Phang (referred to as "Fang"), and a lava beast. This was also called "Max Battle the Monsters".

=== McDonald's playsets ===
Two Mighty Max playsets were released as part of McDonald's promotions. They are rather unique in that they are somewhat larger than a Horror Head but smaller than a Doom Zone. These sets come with no figures; instead, they have a unique feature inside. The 1993 Yeti playset has a Max figure that is fixed to the interior but can be rotated around with a dial, whereas the 1995 Ice Monster playset has a Max decoration that can be moved beneath a transparent surface to impact with two spinning Ice Monster decorations.

- Totally Toy Holiday 93 "Boys" Mighty Max Playset ('Yeti')
- Totally Toy Holiday 95 Mighty Max Playset ('Ice Monster')

=== Watch playsets ===
A number of digital watches were made for the toyline, with a branded strap and openable face that resembled one of the Doom Zones. All of the watches are based on Series 1 Doom Zones, apart from the Lizard (which is from Series 3) and features a radically different strap and packaging.

- Wolfship 7
- Ice Alien
- Skull Dungeon
- Doom Dragon
- Lizard

=== Other merchandise ===
There were multiple other Mighty Max branded items released across the tenure of the franchise, from electronic games to backpacks, though it can be difficult to discern what is and is not official due to a lot of the products being released only in certain regions and/or with very minimal if any advertisement at all. Some items such as the board games and the electronic games are somewhat uncommon but still found from time to time, whereas other items such as the Squirt Heads are very rare.

- Skull Krusher Electronic Game (also known as Crusher)
- Mighty Max in Skull Mountain Handheld Electronic Game [Systema]
- Mighty Max Handheld Electronic Game [Tiger Electronics]
- Mighty Max Watch and Clock Set
- Mighty Max and the Crystal Quest Board Game
- Mighty Max Ultimate Adventure Board Game
- Mighty Max Super Battle Card Game
- Mighty Max Jigsaw [RoseArt]
- Mighty Max Pencil Case #1
- Mighty Max Pencil Case #2
- Mighty Max Backpack
- Mighty Max Zomboid Backpack
- Skull Master Squirt Head
- Warmonger Squirt Head
- Lava Beast Squirt Head
- Fang Squirt Head

=== Colour variants ===
A number of Mighty Max playsets were released throughout the different ranges featuring a different color scheme - in some both the set and the figures are different colors, and in others only the set is different. Although the name of the set and the box art is unchanged, the one exception to this rule is a black and red Ice Alien Doom Zone that was completely rebranded as Fire Alien.

- Wolfship 7 Doom Zone: blue and green interior & silver exterior variant / and light grey exterior variant (aka First Edition).
- Skull Dungeon Doom Zone: grey exterior variant (aka First Edition).
- Doom Dragon Doom Zone: light green exterior variant (aka First Edition).
- Ice Alien Doom Zone: black exterior and red interior (renamed Fire Alien).
- Arachnoid Doom Zone: brown exterior variant (aka First Edition).
- Scorpion Doom Zone: gold and purple exterior variant.
- Hellcat Doom Zone: grey Interior variant (probably a prototype).
- Corpus Horror Head: green variant.
- Lockjaw Horror Head: blue variant.
- Kronosaur Horror Head: red variant.
- Talon Horror Head: blue variant.
- Lava Beast Horror Head: light red variant.
- Droid Horror Head: fluorescent variant.
- Battle Warrior Conqueror: gold and red variant.
- Skull Master Mega Head: pure black wing variant.
- Doom Dragon Watch: light green variant.

== Unreleased toys ==
=== Into The Battle Zone ===
A large number of 'Into The Battle Zone' sets were scheduled for release in 1996, but they were cancelled while they were in the prototype phase. Due to the development that had already occurred, some relatively complete prototype models were in fact created; they were featured in the 1996 SKU List. The Warmonger and Doom Battle Fortresses in particular even appear in an officially released poster, and a number of prototype models have been found in the hands of collectors and merchants, suggesting these were far closer to release than the others which for the most part remain elusive.

Bold text below denotes a set for which at least one prototype model is known to currently exist, whereas italic text denotes a set which does not have an actual picture within the SKU List, suggesting that they did not even make it to the prototype phase. All the other sets in the list do have actual photos of prototypes featured within the SKU List, but it is unclear whether these models actually exist today.

Battle Fortresses (Rebranded Mega Heads)

- Warmonger
- Doom

Battle Warriors

- Arak
- Bat
- Bounty Hunter
- Ninja Samurai
- Norman
- Nosferatu
- Stegoman

Battle Wheels

- Norman
- Arak
- Warmonger
- Conqueror

Battle Zones (Rebranded Doom Zones)

- Mummy King
- Piranha
- Toad

Battle Arenas

- Snake Pit

Figure Packs

- Skull Masters Marauders
- Norman's Heroes
- Max's Avengers
- The Dark Company
- Unnamed Figure Pack #5
- Unnamed Figure Pack #6
- Unnamed Figure Pack #7

=== Variations ===
More variations were planned for the previously released Doom Zones and Horror Heads, and even Shrunken Heads. Colour variations for three Series 1 Doom Zones - Skull Dungeon, Doom Dragon and Temple of Venom - were shown in a Mattel Toy Catalog but never actually released. Additionally, there were a number of metallized sets planned, a first for the series - development images show metallized versions of the Skull Dungeon and Temple of Venom Doom Zones, the Vamp Biter, Lockjaw and Kronosaur Horror Heads, and the Mummy, Insectoid and Rat Trap Shrunken Heads.

== Influence ==
On the trail of the popular Mighty Max, other companies would soon implement the miniature playset style into their merchandise for properties including Star Wars, Godzilla, and Batman Forever. Such toys would often feature a character's head as the unfolded playset and an environment familiar to the property at hand (i.e. Batman's head unfolding to reveal the Batcave). Galoob's popular Micro Machines line already bore a similar scale to Mighty Max and created a variety of miniature Star Wars "head" playsets ranging in size. Playmates Toys also introduced mini Teenage Mutant Ninja Turtles and Star Trek playsets in 1994 and continued producing them the following year.
