= Manta Force =

British toyline

MANTA Force
- Company: Bluebird Toys
- Availability: 1987–1991

MANTA Force is a line of toys produced by British toy company Bluebird in 1987. The toyline was initially divided into two main factions: the heroic MANTA Force and their opponents, the evil Viper Squad. Following the popularity of the MANTA Force toy range, an additional enemy was introduced in 1989; a group of robots known as the Karnoids, who were an enemy of both MANTA Force and the Viper Squad. The following year saw the release of the Stenchoids, which were another new threat for the humans. By the early 1990s however, the popularity of the toy range began to decrease and eventually production was stopped.

== Plot ==
By 2012, humans had colonised many planets throughout the Solar System, including Mars, Jupiter, Venus and Saturn. The planet Earth however, had become polluted and overpopulated. In an attempt to save mankind, President Battaille ordered the creation of the MANTA ship. MANTA Force was an acronym for Multiple-Air-Naval-Terrain-Assault Force and was the most advanced Earth ship ever built. It was designed to work in any environment and its engine was fuelled by a substance called Thorium.

Following the successful launch of the MANTA Force ship, the World Government created the Red Venom to help Manta Force colonise New Earth. On Saturn however, many of the people had grown tired of living in plastic bubbles and believed New Earth should belong to them. During its test runs therefore, the Red Venom was hijacked by a group of highly skilled soldiers called the Viper Squad. Under the command of Major Vex, the Viper Squad attempted to use the Red Venom to hijack the MANTA Force ship, so they could be the ones to colonise New Earth.

Later the two opposing sides joined forces to fight off attacks from a cybernetic alien known as Mad Karnock, who was served by an army of robots called Karnoids. Another enemy also emerged from the swamps of New Earth in the form of the vile Stinkhorn, leader of the Stenchoids, who attempted to destroy the humans with their decomposing Stench weapons (which excreted a green compound similar to Play-Doh).

== Toys ==
=== Manta Force toys ===
- MANTA Force - Giant 2-in-1 spaceship which housed 10 smaller vehicles.
- Red Venom - Huge red spaceship for the Viper Squad. Splits into 9 all-terrain vehicles.
- Battle Fortress - MANTA Force bunker with Viper Squad disc launcher
- Star Blaster - Silver rocket for Viper Squad, which split into 4 individual aircraft.
- Black Barracuda - Black spaceship which separated into several vehicles, including a tank and a Karnoid robot factory.
- Bog Rocket - Purple spaceship, that could convert into a fortress for Stinkhorn and his Stenchoids.
- Astro Shark - White starship that contained several smaller ships. Also included an exclusive red MANTA pilot.

=== Smaller sets ===
- Yellow Wolves - Yellow redecos of the 3 land vehicles from the MANTA ship.
- Red Hawks - Red redecos of the 3 air vehicles from the MANTA ship.
- Blue Sharks - Blue redecos of the 3 sea vehicles from the MANTA ship.
- Black Viper - Black redeco of the Battle Copter from the MANTA ship.
- Porcupine - MANTA Hawks field gun.
- Sting Ray - MANTA Hawks rescue ship.
- Red Viper - Viper Squad attack ship.
- The Sledge Hammer - MANTA Force field Gun.
- The Dictator - Viper Squad field gun.
- The Equalizer & The Vaporizer - Field guns for M.A.N.T.A Force & Viper Squad, sold together.
- The Scythe - MANTA Force vehicle with disc launcher.
- The Cyclops - MANTA Force vehicle with double barreled cannon.
- The Zip Gun - MANTA Force vehicle with rapid fire pellet gun.
- Doomsday - Viper Squad double barreled cannon.
- Rattle Snake - Viper Squad red Zip Gun.
- B.A.T. - Wheeled combat vehicle for the Viper Squad.
- Battle Buzzard - Viper Squad 2-man hang glider.
- Wasp - Viper Squad motorcycle.
- Reinforcements - Includes 16 MANTA men.
- Ammo Pack - 14 replacement projectiles for the vehicles.
- Gutz - Black redeco of Mad Karnack's attack vehicle from the Black Barracuda.
- Ground Hog - Karnoid land vehicle. Can be combined with Black Barracuda.
- Glutten - Karnoid land vehicle. Can be combined with Black Barracuda.
- Snatch - Red Karnoid jet fighter. Can be combined with Black Barracuda.
- Sneak - Red Karnoid jet fighter. Can be combined with Black Barracuda.
- Hammer-Head - Karnoid battering ram.
- Turbo-Drill - Karnoid drill vehicle.
- Sling-Shot - Karnoid catapult.
- Spit-Bug - Karnoid missile launcher.
- Snatch (black) - Black redeco of original Snatch. Can combine with Karnoid land vehicles.
- Sneak (black) - Black redeco of original Sneak. Can combine with Karnoid land vehicles.
- Stinkjet - Silver UFO for the vile Stinkhorn.
- Stenchoid - Included a Stenchoid, M.A.N.T.A men, and a Stench Egg.
- Stench Refill - included a large green Stench refill and several MANTA men.

== Comics ==
=== Eagle strip ===
A comic strip based on the toyline was featured in the IPC Magazines anthology comic Eagle between 5 September 1987 to 23 January 1988. The first episode was written by John Wagner and Alan Grant (under the pseudonym 'R. Steele') and drawn by Ian Kennedy, with subsequent instalments scripted by Alan Hebden and illustrated by Mike Dorey.

=== Other comics ===
Following the conclusion of the comic strip in Eagle, Marvel UK produced a one-shot special in 1989. Bluebird themselves also published two promotional comics to promote the Black Barracuda and Vile Stinkhorn toy ranges. These promotional comics were generally found in the packages of other Manta Force toys.

== Storybooks ==
In July 1989, Carnival released two books based on the Manta Force toyline, called Manta Force - The Enemy Within and Manta Force - Red Venom Attack!. Both books were written by Royston Drake.
