= Take the Test =

1967 educational board game

- Box cover of Take the Test
- Genres: Board game
- Players: 2–6
- Setup time: 1 minute
- Playing time: ~30 minutes
- Chance: Medium (dice)
- Age range: family
- Skills: The Highway Code

Take the Test is an educational game in the format of a board game in which progress is determined by a player's knowledge of The Highway Code.

The game was published in 1967 by British toy and game manufacturer Peter Pan Playthings Ltd, produced in collaboration with the Royal Society for the Prevention of Accidents.

== Gameplay ==
The object of the game is to move around the board by correctly answering highway code questions. Questions are split into three categories, with each one having its own color to readily identify itself; these are: traffic signs (yellow), traffic problem pictures (blue), and general questions (red). The game includes a board, playing pieces, question cards, a rules and answers booklet, a toy traffic light, some 'driving licences', and a pair of dice.
