= Sticker album =

Book containing collectible stickers

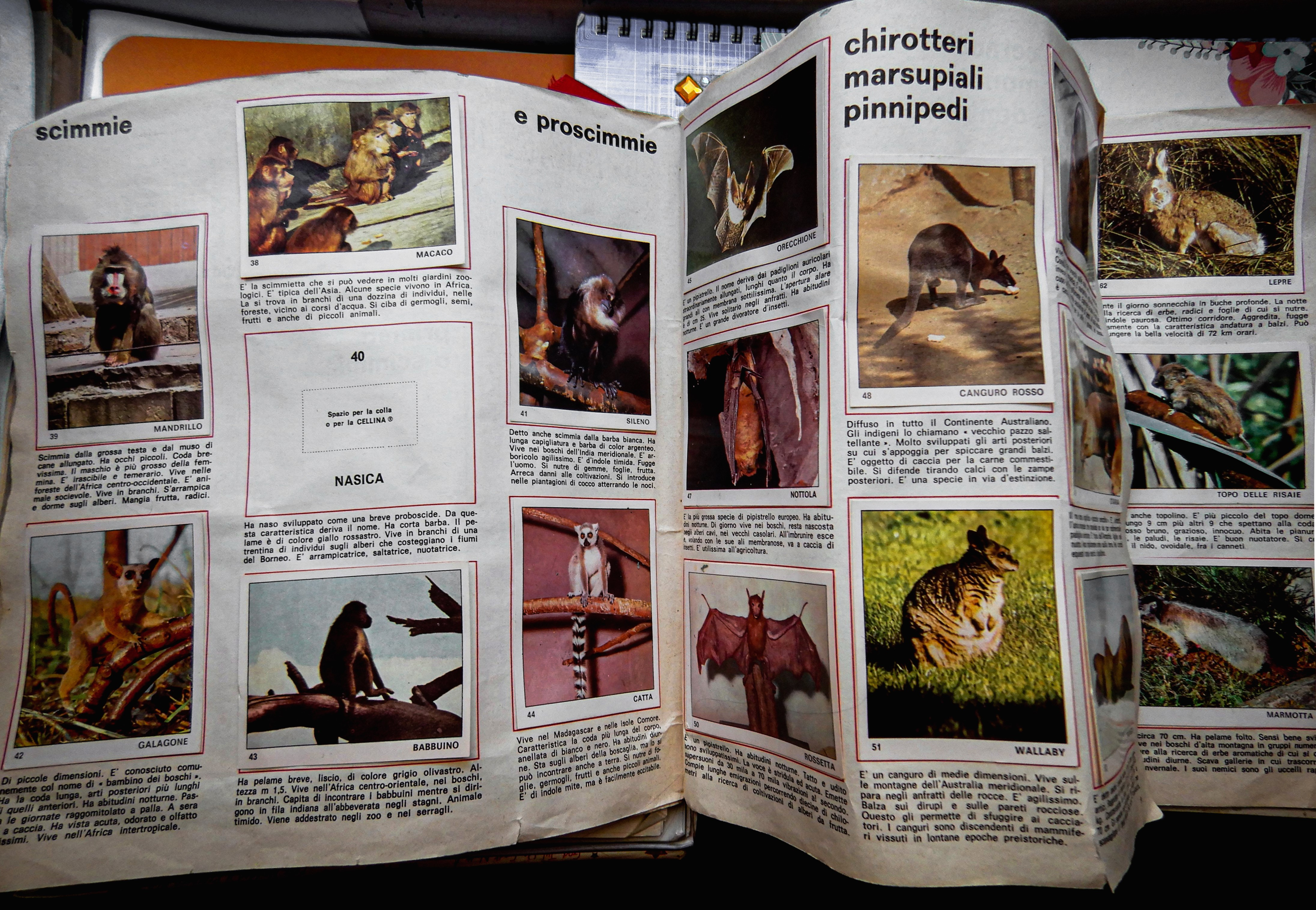
- The sticker album Il Mondo degli Animali (The World of Animals), published in 1970
- Other names: Sticker book
- Type: Trading card
- Company: Panini; Topps; Merlin Publishing
- Country: Worldwide
- Availability: 1961–present
- Features: Association football Television series Music; Movies; Animals; Toys; Sports

A sticker album (or sticker book) is a book or binder to collect stickers, often arranged into designated sections. Commercial sticker albums have been released for sporting events such as the FIFA World Cup and the Premier League, as well as TV shows, movies, animals, and music. Prominent vendors include Panini, Merlin Publishing, Topps, and many others.

== History ==
Dedicated albums have been released for many topics, including:

- 1915 Thrifty Alexander album to promote consumer savings
- 1935 Sinclair Dinosaur Stamp Album
- 1939 New York World's Fair sticker Album of the World's Fair Pictures
- 1942 U.S. military combat unit insignia
- 1955 Around the World Program of geography albums by the American Geographical Society
- 1970 FIFA World Cup collectible association football sticker album from Panini.

Initiating a craze for collecting and trading stickers, UK newspaper The Guardian states, "the tradition of swapping duplicate [World Cup] stickers was a playground fixture during the 1970s and 1980s." A complete 1970 World Cup sticker album signed by Pelé sold for a record £10,450.

The stickers are usually sold in blind packs, so the purchaser does not know which stickers they are buying. Collectors may then swap or sell their spares with other collectors. When perusing a fellow collector's stickers in order to determine which stickers are of interest, it is usual practice for the prospective recipient to sort through the stack of stickers quickly in their hands, and place them into two piles (those of interest, and those which they already possess).

== Themes ==
=== Sports ===
==== FIFA World Cup ====
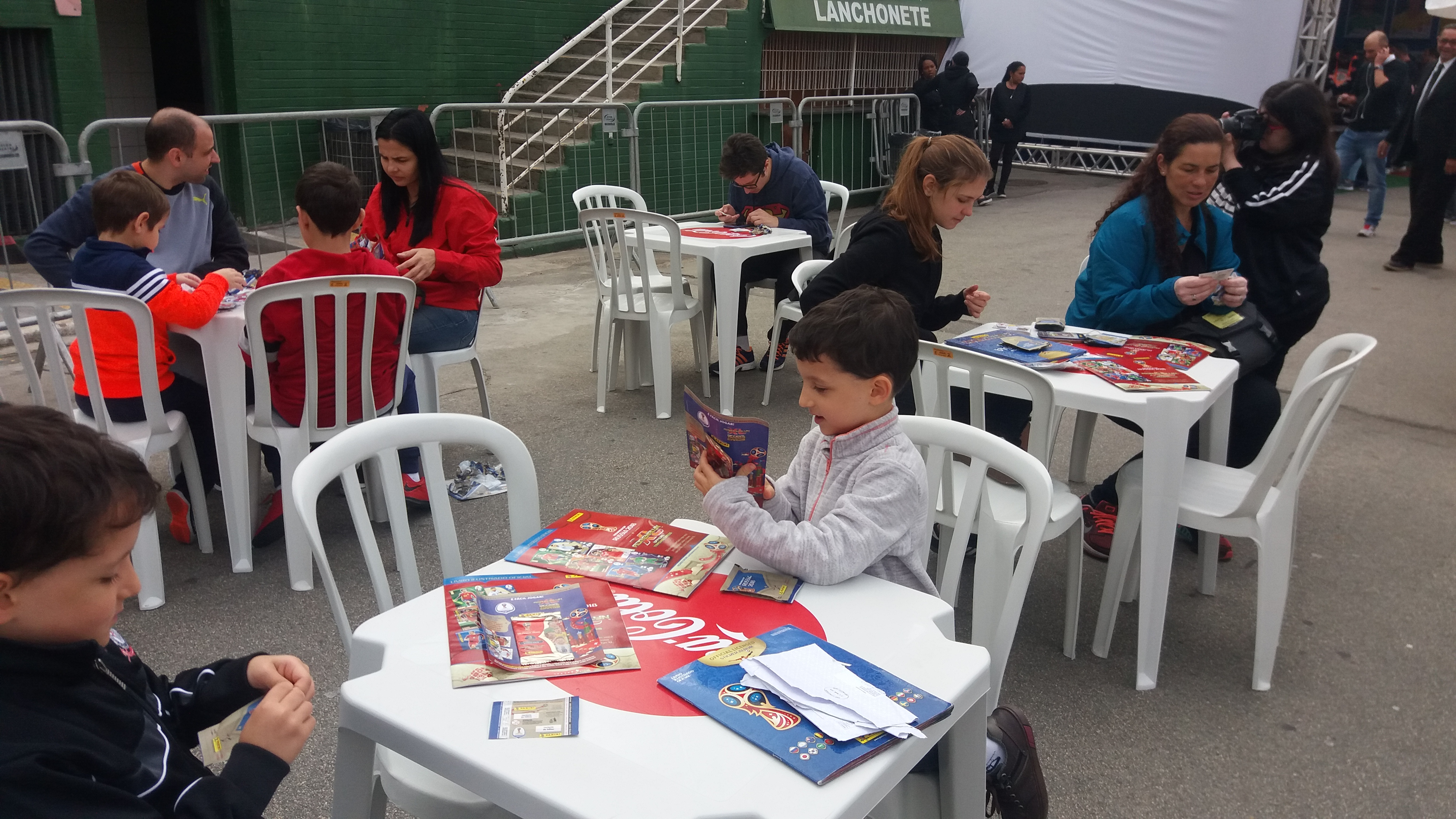
Sticker trade in Brazil for Panini's 2018 World Cup sticker album

Panini has manufactured FIFA World Cup sticker albums since 1970, with its original 48-page, 270-sticker book. The albums have designated sections for each team along with numbered rectangles for each sticker. Each sticker has the player's picture and below it there is usually their name, birth date, position and birthplace. In addition to the players, there are stickers which bear the team's crest and a team photo.

The number of stickers increased as Panini's albums gained popularity: the 1974 and 1978 albums each comprised 400 stickers, and the 1982 and 1986 albums both had room for 427 stickers.

According to Panini, the 2010 FIFA World Cup album, featuring 640 spots for stickers, resulted in over 10 million packs being sold in the U.S. alone.

The 2014 World Cup album featured 639 stickers to collect. In 2018, 681 stickers were produced.

Sticker albums were again announced for the 2026 World Cup. Due to the expansion of the tournament, each pack contained seven stickers as opposed to the usual five, with a total of 980 to collect. In the United States and Canada, a spread in the album was reserved for stickers that could only be obtained from Coca-Cola bottles, with each bottle containing a sticker printed inside the label. Additionally, stickers were printed with different colored borders of varying rarities (called "parallels") in blue, red, green, purple, black, orange, lime green, and pink, instead of the regular white border.

In May 2026, it was announced that the 2030 World Cup would be Panini's last tournament with rights to produce a sticker album, after FIFA announced that Fanatics (via their Topps brand) would distribute collectables for FIFA tournaments from 2031.

===== Digital sticker album =====
In May 2006, Panini partnered with The Coca-Cola Company and Tokenzone to produce the first virtual sticker album for the 2006 FIFA World Cup. For the 2014 FIFA World Cup, three million FIFA.com users took part in the Panini Digital Sticker Album contest. Panini developed an app for the 2018 FIFA World Cup where fans could collect and swap virtual stickers. Five million people gathered digital stickers for the 2018 World Cup.

==== Premier League ====
Under its Merlin brand, since 1994 Topps has held the licence to produce a sticker album for the Premier League, which is the best selling annual collectable for boys in the UK.

== See also ==
- Association football trading card
- Coupon collector's problem
- Merlin Publishing
- Panini Group
- Stamp rally
