= Headache (game) =

Board game

- Other names: Brain Ache
- Designers: Paul Kohner; Frank Kohner
- Publishers: Kohner Brothers; Milton Bradley; CBS Electronics
- Publication: 1968; 58 years ago
- Years active: 1968–?
- Genres: Board game
- Languages: English
- Players: 2–4
- Playing time: 20'
- Age range: 5+
- Skills: Strategy, Probability

Headache is a board game in which two to four players take turns moving cone-shaped pieces around a board until one player succeeds in capturing every other piece on the board.

== Gameplay and history ==
Players initially take turns rolling the dice to determine who goes first, according to the highest roll. Turns pass to the left.

Each player introduces their cones to the board, one at a time, using the appropriately-colored starting spot, during their first four turns. After all the cones have been introduced, the players then take turns moving one of their pieces (known as "cones" or "men") around the circular board. There are two parallel tracks that intersect regularly in eight places, marked with an "X"; crossing from track to track is allowed only at these intersections. All players are welcome to occupy any space on either track throughout the game, provided the die rolls allow.

If a player's move results in their piece landing on top of another player's piece, it creates a "stack". The stack is controlled and moved by the player whose color is on top; stacks also may be captured or capture other piece(s) when moved. However, the standard rules state that each player's starting space is a "safe" spot and may not be captured immediately after being introduced. As an option, all track intersections marked with an "X" may be considered a safe spot.

Play moves in circles until one player has captured every other players' cones on the board and is declared the winner.

Headache was first introduced in 1968 by the Kohner Brothers and was later manufactured by Milton Bradley. In the UK the game (called Game of Headache) was released in 1968 through Peter Pan Playthings.

== Equipment ==
=== The board ===
Game board arrangement with dual tracks and eight intersections

Headache uses a round board in which movement is along one of two tracks along the perimeter of the board, and the "pop-o-matic" bubble with the dice is in the center. There is a starting point for each of the four colors. The board has a total of 48 spaces, including 8 track intersections, each marked with an X. Four of these eight intersections are starting points. The spaces protrude from the surface of the board, thereby allowing the cones to rest on them neatly.

The two tracks are the outer and the inner track. The outer track has three spaces between successive intersections, and the inner track has two. This difference allows players to strategically move around the board.

Any player who has their cone on a safe spot cannot be captured, and an opponent is not permitted to land a cone on such a spot occupied by one. A player is allowed to keep their cone on a safe spot as long as they wish, provided there is another legal move. The exception is on the first four rounds of turns, in which each player must move a different cone, clearing the starting space.

=== Pop-o-matic dice ===
Video of the Headache board's "pop-o-matic" dice roller

Like similar games such as Trouble, Headache has its dice in a "pop-o-matic" bubble in the center of the board. The bubble is pressed to roll the dice. Unlike Trouble, which has a single die in the bubble, Headache has two dice. One die is a regular die featuring the numbers one through six. The other is blank on five sides, and has a red dot on the sixth side. The red dot, if rolled allows for an extra turn.

=== Cones and stacks ===
The playing pieces in the game are known as "cones" (or "men" in the UK) because of their cone shape. This allows them to be stacked on top of one another in unlimited numbers. Each player starts off with four cones, and whenever one player lands on the space occupied by the cone of another, this player captures the opponent's cone. The capturing player places their cone on top of the cone of the player being captured, where it remains throughout the game. The result is known as a "stack." Stacks have the special privilege to move around the board in either direction, whereas single cones may only move clockwise.
