= Bluebird Toys =

British toy company

Bluebird Toys plc
- Industry: Entertainment
- Founded: 1980; 46 years ago
- Founder: Torquil Norman
- Defunct: 1998; 28 years ago
- Fate: Merged to Mattel
- Headquarters: U.K.
- Products: Toys; Dolls; Games
- Brands: Manta Force; Mighty Max; Thomas and Friends
- Subsidiaries: Peter Pan Playthings (1987–); Merit Toys (1988–)

Bluebird Toys plc was a British toy company. They were responsible for the Polly Pocket brand, Havok wargame and Disney Tiny Collection. The company's previous toy lines included Manta Force, Oh Penny!, the British version of Oh Jenny! from Matchbox Toys, Mighty Max and miniature Thomas and Friends sets.

== History ==
Torquil Norman founded Bluebird Toys in 1980, his first product being the now famous Big Yellow Teapot House. This was one of the first 'container' houses which broke away from the traditional architectural style of dolls' houses in favour of this light and colourful family home. He is also famous for his Big Red Fun Bus and Big Jumbo Fun Plane, A La Carte Kitchen, Polly Pocket, Lucy Locket (a larger version of Polly Pocket) and the Mighty Max range, as well as the invention of the plastic lunch box.

Bluebird was an almost immediate success, coming within £18,000 of breaking even in its first year of business, on turnover of £1.25m. By 1983 turnover had reached £3.4, and in 1985 the company went public on the Unlisted Securities Market. The shares had reached 500p by 1987, before sliding back to 26p in 1991, when the company reported a hefty loss.

The company acquired Peter Pan Playthings in 1987 and Merit Toys in 1988.

The company was saved by the Polly Pocket range, introduced in 1989, which became a global phenomenon. By 1993, the shares were back up to 575p, and the next year Bluebird announced profits of £7m on sales of over £40m, rising again to £20m on turnover of £100m in 1994–95. This figure was dominated by Polly Pocket and Mighty Max, a parallel line for boys introduced in 1992, accounting between them for 87% of sales. Already by 1994 nearly three-quarters of Britain's 2 million girls aged between three and eight were estimated to own a Polly Pocket. The shares rose still further, trebling again by October 1995 when the company announced a license for a new line of Disney characters in the pocket-size format, which became the Disney Tiny Collection series, and a new distribution deal with Mattel.

However, by 1997, Polly Pocket sales had fallen back. Mattel announced it would take no more of the existing stock until a reformat of the brand, and the share price was down to only a quarter of its previous peak value.

Financier Ron Brierley's Guinness Peat Group made an unsolicited bid for the company in January 1998, but was outbid by Mattel acting as a white knight. Mattel swiftly went on to integrate Bluebird's products into its own lines, closing the headquarters in Swindon and offering redundancy packages to all those who were not offered relocation to the Mattel headquarters.
