= Trouble (board game) =

Board game

- Designers: Frank Kohner; Paul Kohner; Fred Kroll
- Publishers: Hasbro; Winning Moves Games USA
- Publication: 1965; 61 years ago
- Players: 2–4
- Setup time: c. <1 minute
- Playing time: c. 30 minutes
- Chance: High (dice)
- Age range: Family

Trouble (known as Frustration in the UK and Kimble in Finland) is a board game in which players compete to be the first to send four pieces all the way around a board. It is based on a traditional game called "Frustration" played on a wooden board with indentations for marble playing pieces and rules similar to Parcheesi. Pieces are moved according to the roll of a die using a contained device called a "Pop-O-Matic".

== History ==
Trouble was developed by the Kohner Brothers and initially manufactured by Irwin Toy Ltd., later by the Milton Bradley Company (now part of Hasbro). The game was launched in America in 1965. The classic version is marketed by Winning Moves Games USA. The gameplay, board, and concept is derivative of the British board game Ludo, itself based on the Indian board game pachisi.

A similar game called Headache was also produced by Milton Bradley; besides a different track layout, its pawns are conical in contrast to the cylindrical pieces used in Trouble. A variation named Double Trouble was originally published by Milton Bradley in 1987. Each player moves two pieces along a path, using separate Pop-o-Matic dice-roller devices.

== Gameplay ==
Game board schematic for Trouble; home areas are outside the track, starting spaces indicated by double circle, and finish areas are on the radial spokes

Players may move pieces out of their home onto their designated start space only when the die lands on 6. Getting a 6 at any point in the game also allows the player to take another turn, even if the player cannot move any of their pieces (as they cannot land on any of their own pieces). They also may move a new piece out even if they have another piece in play, and can also do the same if another player's piece is occupying their "start" space, but can not do so when one of their own pieces is occupying their "start" space.

Pieces move clockwise around the board. Players send opponents' pieces back to the start by landing on them. Pieces are protected from capture after arriving in the final four slots of the finish area. Unlike more complex race games such as Parcheesi, counters cannot be maneuvered to block opponents' moves.

=== Pop-o-Matic die container ===
The most notable feature of Trouble is the "Pop-O-Matic" die container. The device is a clear plastic hemisphere containing the die, placed over a flexible sheet. Players roll the die by pressing down quickly on the bubble, which flexes the sheet and causes the die to tumble upon its rebound. The Pop-O-Matic container produces a popping sound when it is used, and prevents the die from being lost (and players from cheating by improper rolling). It allows for quick die rolls and players' turns can be performed in rapid succession. The die is imprinted with Arabic numerals rather than the traditional circular pips, although the circular pips are used in the Travel version, which contains a cover to keep the pegs from being lost.

Demonstration of the Pop-O-Matic bubble from Headache

If the die in the "Pop-O-Matic" container has not clearly landed on a number, then the player who popped it can tap the "Pop-O-Matic", but may not re-pop while the die is in limbo.
