= Polly Pocket =

Mattel Inc.-owned British toy line

- Type: Doll
- Invented by: Origin Products
- Company: Bluebird Toys (1989–1998); Mattel (1998–present)
- Country: United Kingdom
- Availability: July 24, 1989–present
- Materials: Plastic
- Slogan: Friends! Fun! Adventure! (2010-2017); Tiny is Mighty! (2018–present)
- Official website

Polly Pocket is a toy line of inch-tall dolls and accessories sold by Mattel.

Origin Products (Chris Wiggs and Chris Taylor) developed the basic concept in 1983, influenced by Torquil Norman's pre-existing ideas for miniature, portable playsets. At this point, it was a simple wooden stick figure that did not bend. The interior was a basic fabrication inside a powder compact. After it was shown to Bluebird, Torquil Norman asked if the figure could be made to bend; this problem was duly solved by Brian Whitehead at Origin, and after purchasing the licence, Norman's team of designers at Bluebird created a series of Clam-case playsets available for sale on the toy market c. 1989, with Mattel being the main distributor. Between 2012 and 2018, it was not sold in the US and declined in other countries, with Brazil being the only country to sell the products throughout that period. Concerns grew due to loose magnets and the small size (which caused injuries to some children when ingested), and millions of Polly Pocket toys were recalled from the shelves.

== History ==
=== Origins and early history ===
Torquil Norman and Bluebird Toys of Swindon, England, had licensed the concept, and the first Polly Pocket toys appeared in stores in 1989. Mattel held a distribution arrangement with Bluebird Toys for Polly Pocket items in the early 1990s. In 1998, while production lulled, Bluebird Toys endured multiple hostile takeover attempts until Mattel finally purchased both the brand and Bluebird Toys later that year. Bluebird Toys' sets are now enthusiasts' collectables.

The original Polly Pocket toys were plastic cases that opened to form a dollhouse or other playset with Polly Pocket figurines less than an inch tall. The dolls folded in the middle, like the case, and had circular bases that slotted into holes in the case interior, allowing them to stand securely at particular points in the house. This was particularly useful for moving points in the case. Because the dolls were so small, sometimes they came enclosed in lockets and rings instead of the more typical playset cases.

In 1998, Mattel redesigned Polly Pocket. The new doll was larger, with a more lifelike appearance than the original dolls, leading many to comment that the word "Pocket" was no longer relevant. She had a straight ponytail, rather than the curly bob hairstyle used previously. The following year, Mattel also introduced "Fashion Polly!," which used the same characters from the new Polly Pocket (Polly, Lea, Shani, Lila, etc.), but they came in the form of 3+3/4 inches (9.5 cm) plastic jointed dolls. They gave a new spin on fashion dolls; instead of traditional cloth clothing, Polly Pockets used unique "Polly Stretch" garments, created by Genie Toys, rubbery plastic clothes that could be put on the dolls and removed. There are also some boy dolls (Rick, Steven, etc.). Like the Barbie and MGA's Bratz brands, Polly Pocket has also expanded into a media franchise, consisting of DVD-exclusive animated films, books, and a website, with the latter currently a section under the larger Mattel website.

=== Recent history ===
Sales of Polly Pocket met with various headwinds, especially the growing interest in digital toys, such as Tamagotchi in the 1980s, and by the 1990's the first mobile phones became ubiquitous as their computing power, games, apps, and interactive scope increased. In 2002, Mattel stopped producing the smaller Polly Pocket playset range but continued to produce the larger fashion doll.

In 2004, Mattel introduced the Polly Pocket "Quik Clik" line. Instead of having rubbery clothes, the dolls had plastic clothes that would click together with magnets. On November 22 2006, 4.4 million Polly Pocket playsets were recalled by Mattel after children in the United States swallowed loose magnetic parts. Affected toys had been sold around the world for three years prior.

In 2012, due to safety concerns, Polly Pocket toys were discontinued in the US.

On February 12, 2018, it was announced that Polly Pocket would return again, this time targeting the retro collector market. The new toys are miniature dolls in playsets, like the original 1990s Polly Pocket, rather than the larger Fashion Polly. However, they are slightly larger than the original 1990s version. Rather than slotting into holes in the case, the new Polly is made of a flexible plastic that sticks to certain surfaces, but also bends so she can sit in a chair.

Clothing brands such as Hot Topic, Unique Vintage, and Cider, along with fashion designers such as Marc Jacobs, Mimi Wade, and Loewe have created merchandise inspired by the vintage Polly Pocket brand, including handbags, makeup, and clothing items for adults.

== Adaptations ==
=== Films ===
- Polly Pocket: Lunar Eclipse (2004)
- Polly Pocket: 2 Cool at the Pocket Plaza (2005)
- PollyWorld (2006)
- Untitled Live-action film (TBA)

=== TV Series ===
- Polly Pocket (TV series) (2018–2025)

== Characters ==
- Polly Pocket: Originally with curly blonde hair and a headband in different colours that usually matched her outfit, Polly Pocket was the mayor of Pollyville. Later, her design changed to feature a ponytail instead of the curly hair.

Below is the list of other recurring characters who appeared in several early Polly Pocket playsets. This list does not include characters who only appear in one or two playsets.

=== Bluebird Toys era (1989–1997) ===
Kids and adults:

- Tiny Tina: A doll with blonde pigtails.
- Wee Willie: A boy doll with a blond bowl cut.
- Midge: A strawberry blonde doll with a "Dutch boy" haircut with bangs; usually wearing overalls.
- Little Lulu: Straight brown hair parted in the middle, usually wearing a playsuit or swimsuit. She is named after a comic character.
- Pixie: Brown hair parted in the centre in a flip style, usually wearing a long-sleeved top with a scoop neckline in different colours.
- Mr Sprout: A farmer.
- Mr Moneybags: A balding businessman always working at the office.
- Mr Skint: Pollyville's bank manager.
- Kate (aka Buttons): A girl doll with short, straight blonde or red hair.
- Diddy: A boy doll with a brown bowl cut.
- Titch: A boy doll with brown hair in a bowl cut, sometimes wears a hat.
- Minny: An Asian doll with a black bob with bangs.
- Mr Fry: A chef working at the diner.
- Dishy: A waitress also working at the diner.
- Mr Marks: A teacher working in the class.
- Matt: An African-American boy doll with a crew cut.
- Rosie: A girl doll with a blonde top bun.
- Daisy: A girl doll with shoulder-length blonde hair with bangs.
- Suki: A Japanese girl doll with black hair in a bun. She is Atsuko's sister.
- Atsuko: A Japanese girl doll with bangs and straight black hair.
- Heidi: A girl doll with a blonde ponytail wearing a pink winter hat.
- Tammy: A girl doll with brown hair.
- Mrs Chime: An older woman doll with long grey hair pulled back with magenta flowers.
- Mr Time: An old man doll with a long beard and a bald head.
- Santa: Included in the Holiday Toy Shop playset.
- Mrs Claus: Included in the Holiday Toy Shop playset.
- Topper: An inanimate snowman.
- Bella: A girl doll with short brown hair.
- Fifi: A girl doll with straight brown hair, wearing a floral hat.
- Yasmin: A princess with a headdress, later released with long red hair.
- Anna: A princess with a blonde bob.
- Gemma: A princess with a brown bob with bangs.
- Mia: A princess with straight blonde hair.
- Alice: A redhead from the Polly Pool Party playset.
- Lily: A girl doll with a brunette ponytail from the Polly Pool Party playset.
- Nancy (aka Cathy): A bride (with a brown or red bob) while married.
- Peter: A groom (with a red bowl cut) while married
- Patty: A waitress from the Polly at the Burger Stand playset.
- Mrs Kelly: An African-American female teacher (with a low ponytail) also working at the class.
- Prince Caspar: A boy doll with short brown hair parted to the left and combed to the right.
- Mimi (aka Becky): A girl doll with light brown hair.
- Daria: A girl doll from the Holiday Toy Shop playlist.
- Chelsie (aka Laura): An African-American doll with straight hair with bangs.
- Tory (aka Meena): An African-American girl doll with a short flip hairdo.
- Kelly (aka Bridget): A girl doll with reddish-brown pigtails.
- Belinda (aka Josie): A female chef with brown (later red) hair; chef from Pizzeria playset.
- Tamsin: An African-American girl doll with pigtails.
- Emily: A girl doll with short brown hair with bangs.
- Jessica: A girl doll with a red flip hairdo.
- Dixie (aka Maria): A Latina girl doll with dark brown pigtails.
- Mitzi (aka Kim): An African-American girl doll with straight hair.
- Ms Lila (aka Ms Penny): A female teacher (with red hair in a low ponytail) always working in the class.
- Alexia: A girl doll with straight brown hair.
- Fairy Ella: A girl fairy doll with strawberry blonde hair and a purple flower crown.
- Jenny: A girl doll with red pigtails.
- Tawny: A girl doll with straight brown hair.
- Sammie: A girl doll featured on the Skateboarding rink.
- Ben: A boy doll with curly brown hair from the Strollin’ playset.
- Tom & Tessa: Baby dolls from the Strollin’ playset.
- Lucy, Alice, and Toby: Baby dolls from the Babysittin’ Stamper playset.
- Bellman: A boy doll from the Hollywood Star playset with light brown hair.
- Sunshine Midge: A girl doll with a blonde Dutch-cut hairstyle.
- Mermaid Pearl: A girl mermaid doll with long red wavy hair.
- Mermaid Suzie: A girl mermaid doll with long blonde hair and a purple hibiscus in her hair.
- Tiny Lily: A girl doll with red hair in a ponytail held with white flowers, green grass skirt, white lei, barefoot, holding a dark pink flower with a green stem in her left hand, tan base. From the Glitter Island playset.
- Laura: A girl doll with reddish-brown hair. Princess version is from the Princess Palace Storybook playset.
- Emma: A girl doll with dark brown pigtails from the Slumber Party playset.
- Dana: A girl doll with brown pigtails from the Starlight Dinner Party playset.

=== Mattel era (1998–present) ===
- Shani: An African-American doll with curly dark hair.
- Lila: A doll with a brown pixie cut, later a red ponytail.

==== Pre-2018 ====
- Todd: A boy with brown hair.
- Lea: A doll with long red hair.
- Ana/Crissy: A dark-haired doll with curly hair. In 2010, her ethnicity is Asian, and her hair is long, jet black, and dyed with pink streaks.
- Rick: A boy with blond hair.
- Kerstie: A doll with chocolate brown hair.

=== Other toylines ===
Bluebird released Disney's Polly Pocket-style playsets from 1995 to 1999. These were called the Disney “Tiny Collection” or “Mini collection”.

== See also ==
- Mighty Max
