= The Adventures of Mighty Max =

1994 video game

- North American Genesis box art
- Developer: WJS Design
- Publisher: Ocean Software
- Platforms: Sega Genesis, Super NES
- Release: Genesis: PAL: November 1994; NA: February 1995; Super NES: PAL: November 1994; NA: March 1995
- Genres: Action-adventure, platform
- Modes: Single-player, multiplayer

The Adventures of Mighty Max is a 1994 action-adventure platform game developed by the British studio WJS Design and published by the Ocean Software for the Sega Genesis and Super Nintendo Entertainment System. The game is based on the Mighty Max television series.

== Gameplay ==
The player controls Mighty Max from the television series. The game has several environments that the player has to explore, including: a factory, Hell, a pyramid, a cave system, and a jungle. The player is given a ball launcher gun, which can be used to help traverse these environments. The player can also manipulate objects, most notably a metal crate that must be carried to the end of each level.

== Development and release ==
The Adventures of Mighty Max was developed by WSJ Design. Founded by Wayne Smithson in 1984 and based in Leeds, the studio previously worked on numerous titles for the Amiga, Atari ST, Dragon 32, and Sega Genesis. Production on the game began as an original concept by WJS on the Amiga. Smithson claimed it was worked on for one year before publisher Ocean Software partnered with it with the Mighty Max license. Ocean had a penchant for adapting film and television properties into games, and Mighty Max was just one of several in simultaneous development beginning in mid-1993. Mighty Max was the WJS's first licensed game.

The game was in development for the Amiga 1200, SNES, and Genesis. According to programmer Paul Hoggart, the Amiga version was the priority early on, focusing heavily on its two-player split-screen mode. Hoggart stated that he wished he could have contributed more to the design to make it "even more 'arcadey' as opposed to strategy-ish". Smithson revealed that the levels were initially created using DPaint, but the team shifted to a level editor to simultaneously playtest the mechanics. A total of 50 levels were crafted over two weeks, but this was eventually cut down to 25.

Despite significant magazine coverage around a projected launch at the end of 1994, the Amiga version was cancelled. Ocean began releasing the console editions in the PAL regions in November 1994, with Sony Electronic Publishing handling distribution. The Genesis and SNES versions were released in North America in February and March 1995, respectively.

== Reception ==
Reception

Review scores
Publication	Score
Computer and Video Games	35% (GEN); 37% (SNES)
Electronic Gaming Monthly	4.8/10 (GEN)
HobbyConsolas	75/100 (GEN); 78/100 (SNES)
Hyper	48/100 (GEN); 48/100 (SNES)
Next Generation	1/5 (SNES)
Nintendo Power	2.8/5 (SNES)
Total!	81/100 (SNES)
Consoles +	70% (SNES)
MAN!AC	39% (SNES)
Player One	60% (GEN); 60% (SNES)
Power Unlimited	74/100 (GEN)
Sega Magazine	41/100 (GEN)
Sega Pro	58% (GEN)
TodoSega	85% (GEN)

Next Generation reviewed the SNES version of the game, rating it one star out of five; the magazine was critical of the game's design and gameplay and considered the game "awful" and "not fun".

Electronic Gaming Monthly's five-critic review crew gave the Genesis version of Mighty Max an average score of 4.8 out of 10, calling the game "incredibly slow" and "unappealing".
