= List of companies based in London =

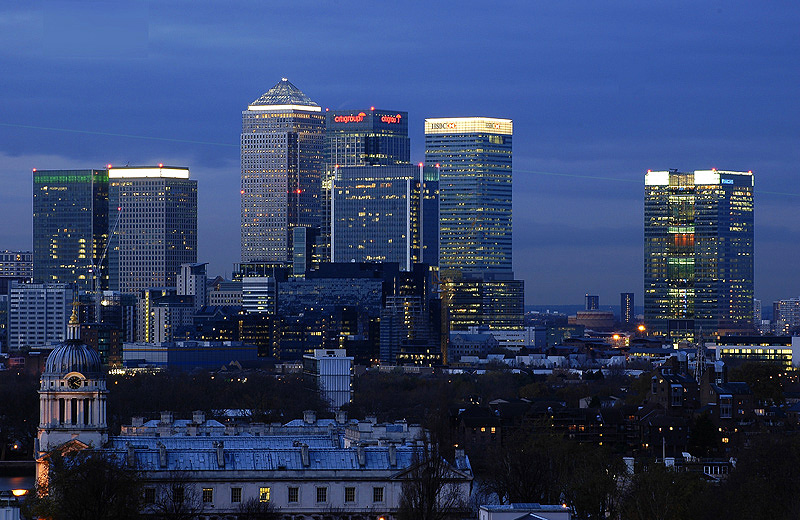
Canary Wharf is a major business and financial centre and is home to some of the UK's tallest buildings.

This is a list of companies in London, England. London is the capital city of England and the United Kingdom. With an estimated 8,308,369 residents in 2012, London is the most populous region, urban zone and metropolitan area in the United Kingdom. The city generates approximately 20 per cent of the UK's GDP; while the economy of the London metropolitan area—the largest in Europe—generates approximately 30 per cent of the UK's GDP.

London is one of the pre-eminent financial centres of the world and vies with New York City as the most important location for international finance. Over half of the UK's top 100 listed companies (the FTSE 100) and over 100 of Europe's 500 largest companies have their headquarters in central London. Over 70 per cent of the FTSE 100 are located within London's metropolitan area, and 75 per cent of Fortune 500 companies have offices in London. London is home to 10 Global Fortune 500-ranked corporations.

== Companies based in London ==
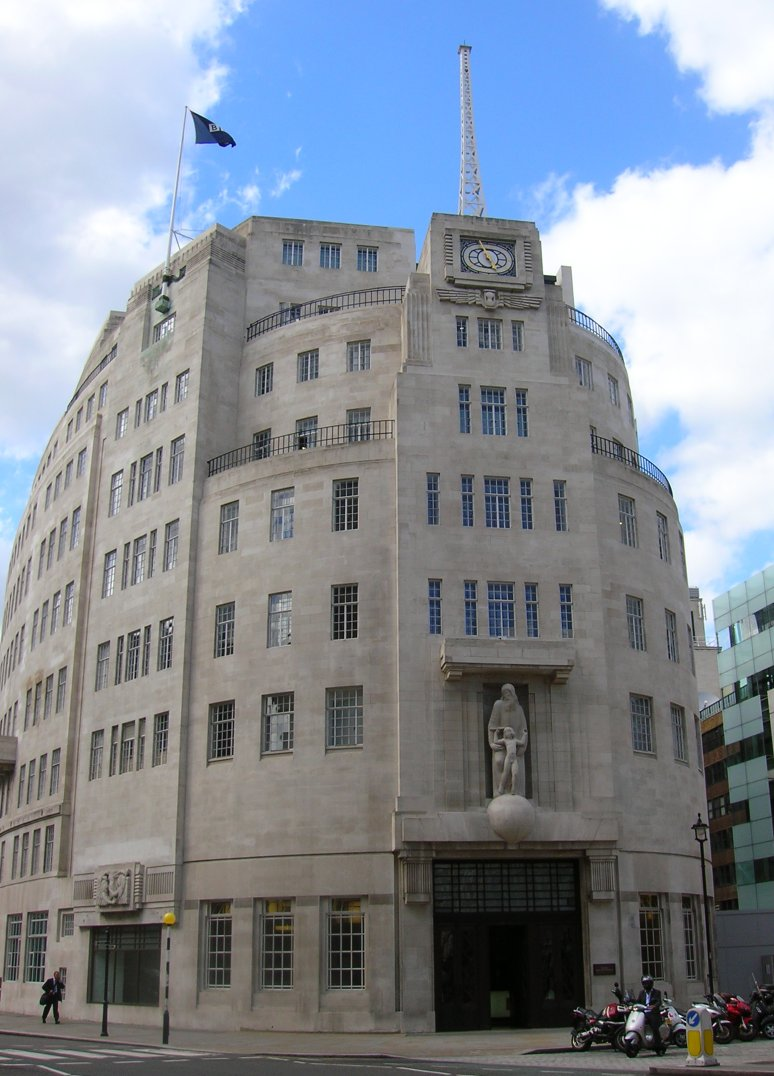
Broadcasting House in London is the headquarters and registered office of the BBC.

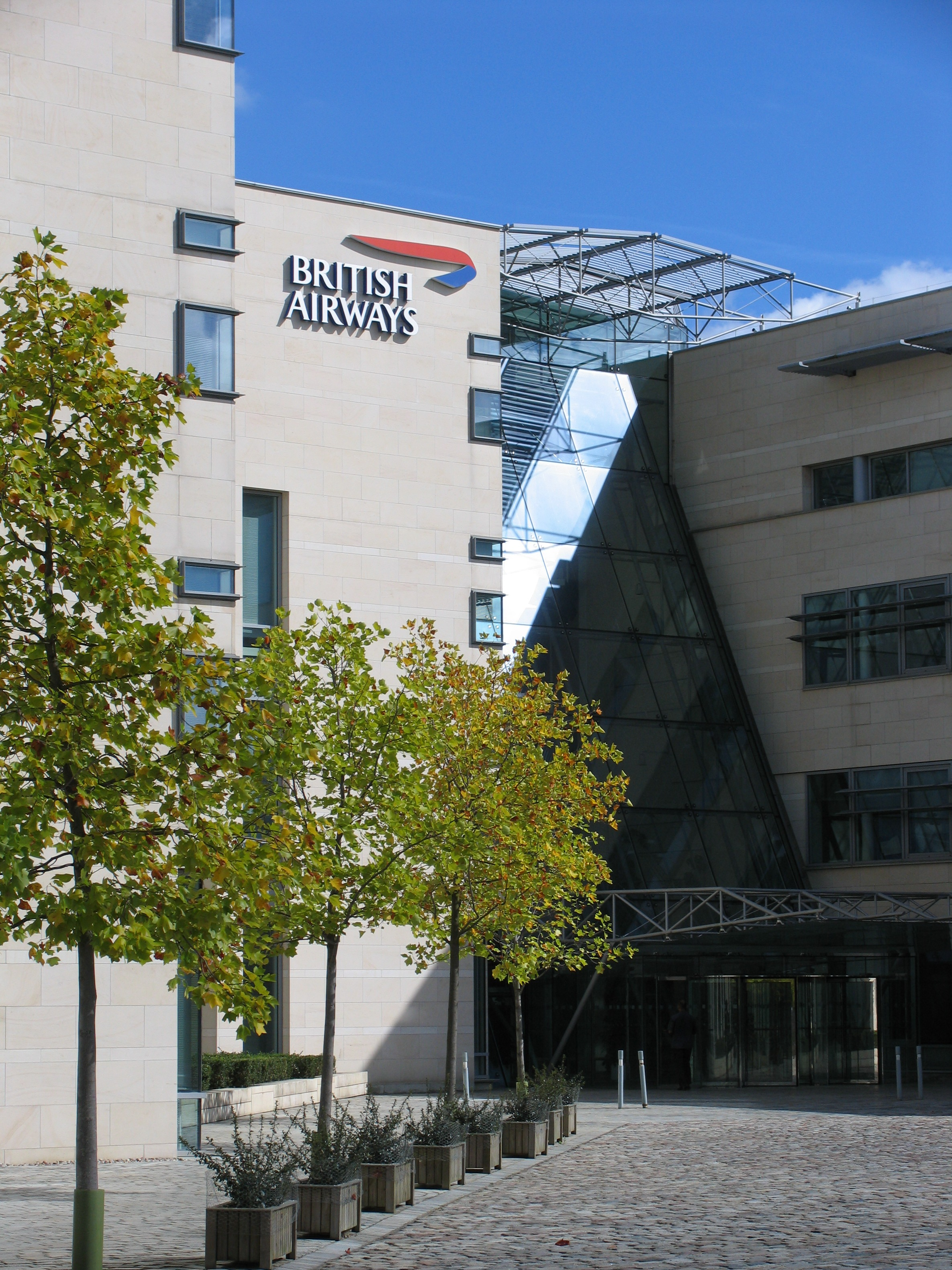
Waterside, the head office of British Airways

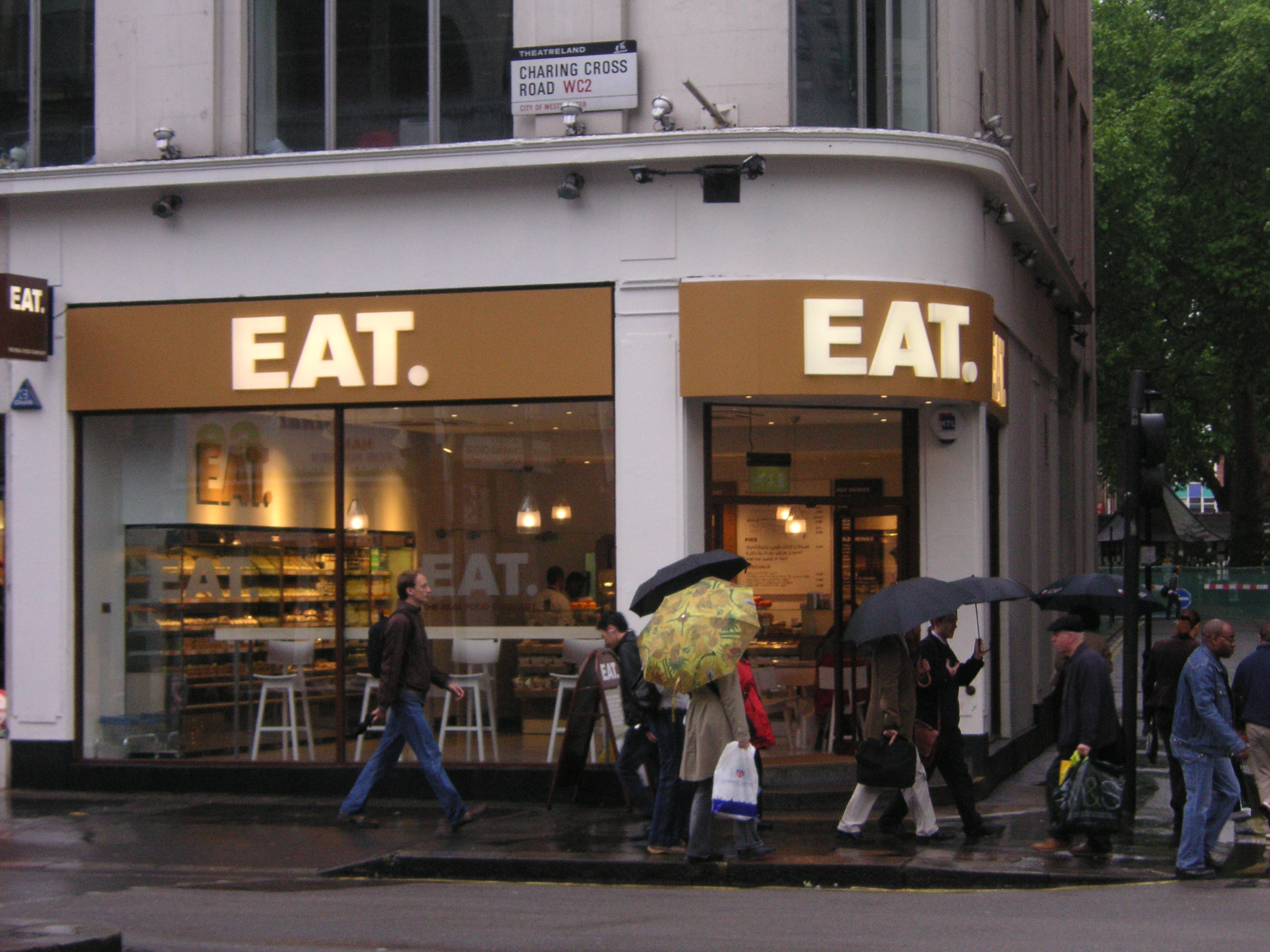
An Eat restaurant on Charing Cross Road, London

Floris of London is the oldest English retailer of toiletries and accessories and second oldest in the world after Farina gegenüber of Cologne, Germany.

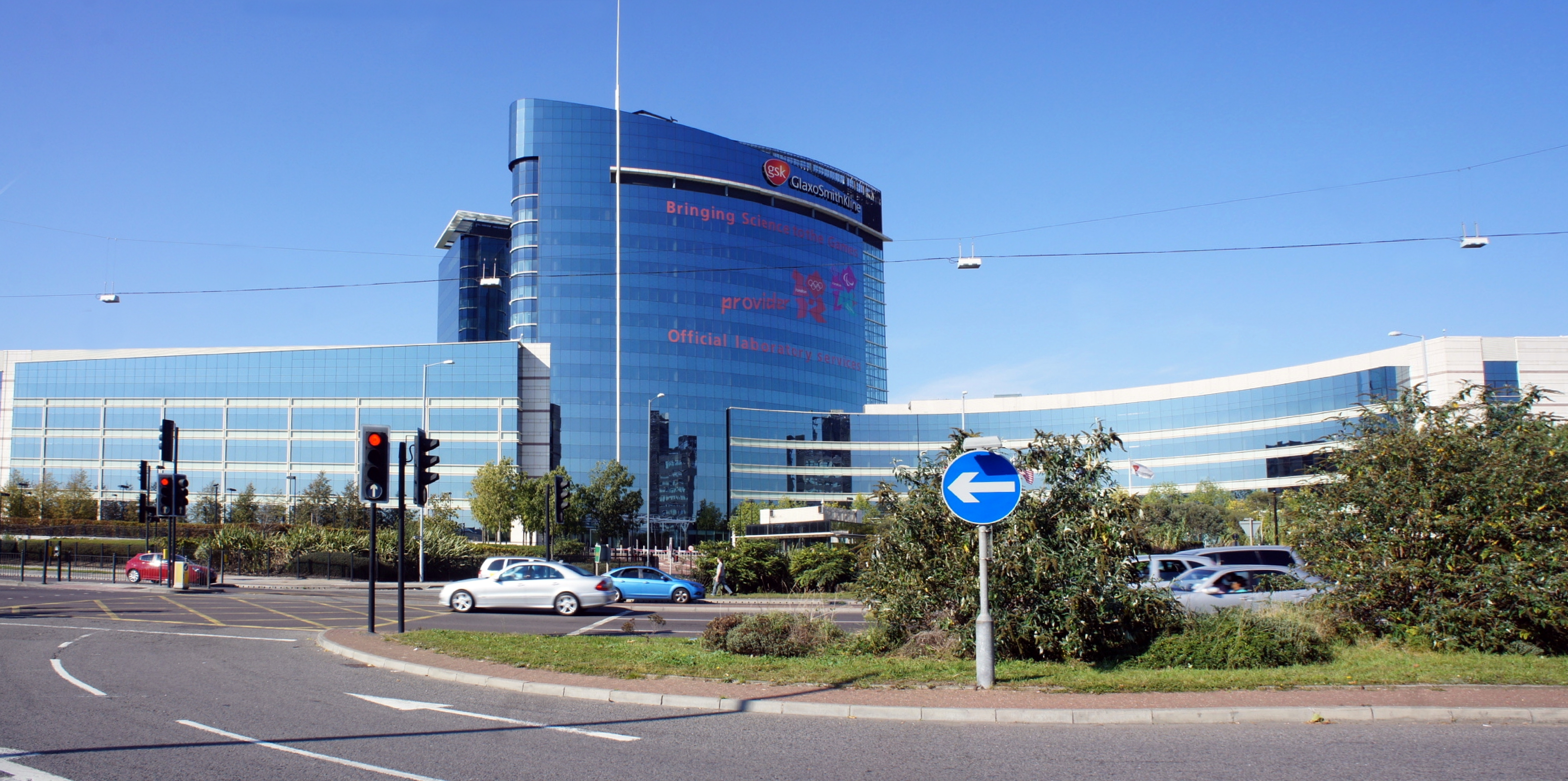
GSK House, the current world headquarters of GSK in Brentford, London

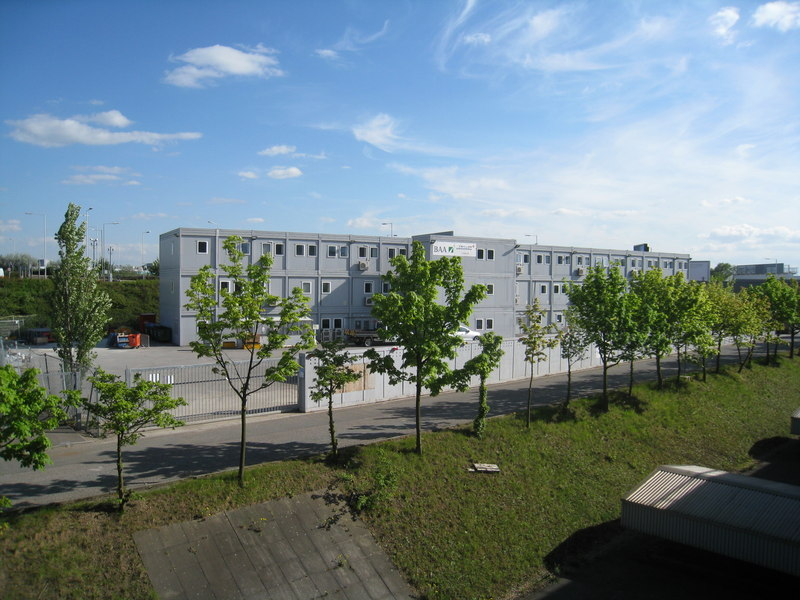
The Heathrow Airport Holdings building at Heathrow Airport

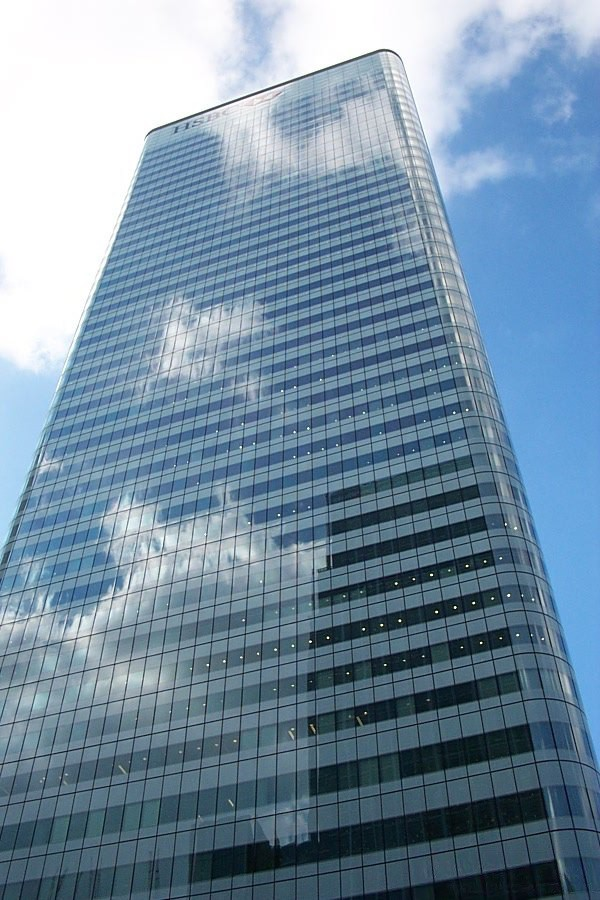
8 Canada Square, the world headquarters of HSBC in Canary Wharf, London

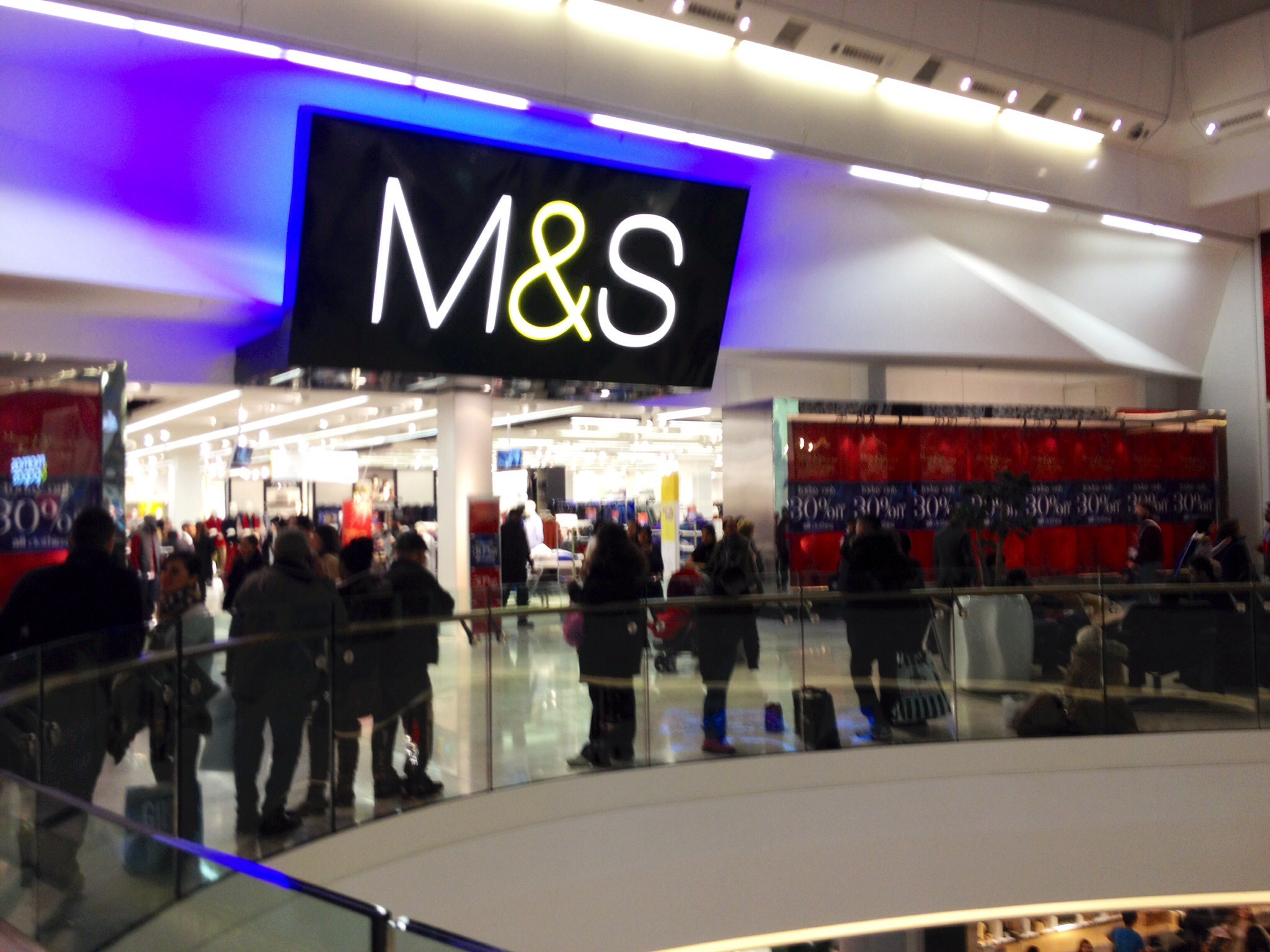
A Marks & Spencer store in the Westfield London shopping centre

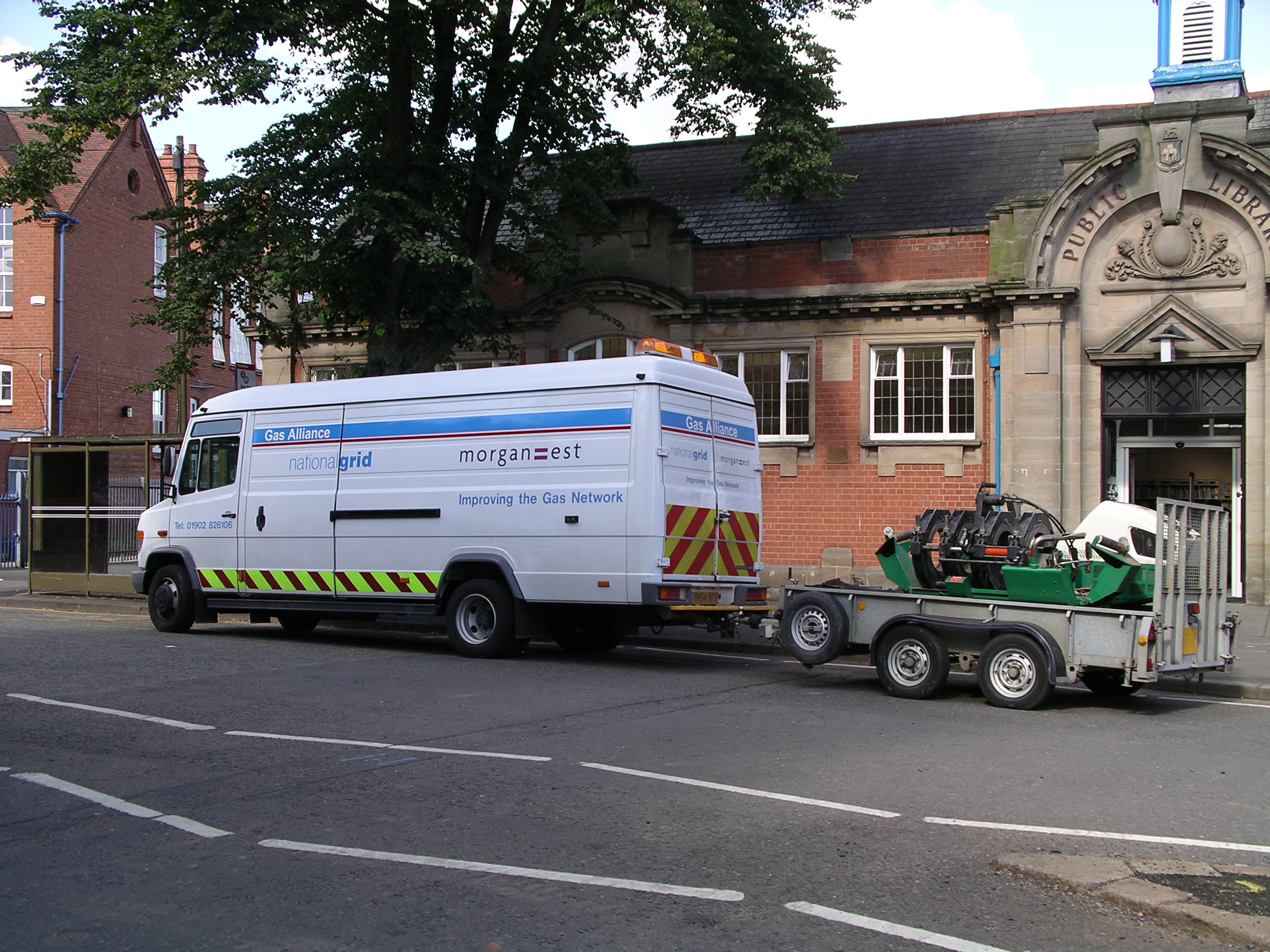
A National Grid van working in central England

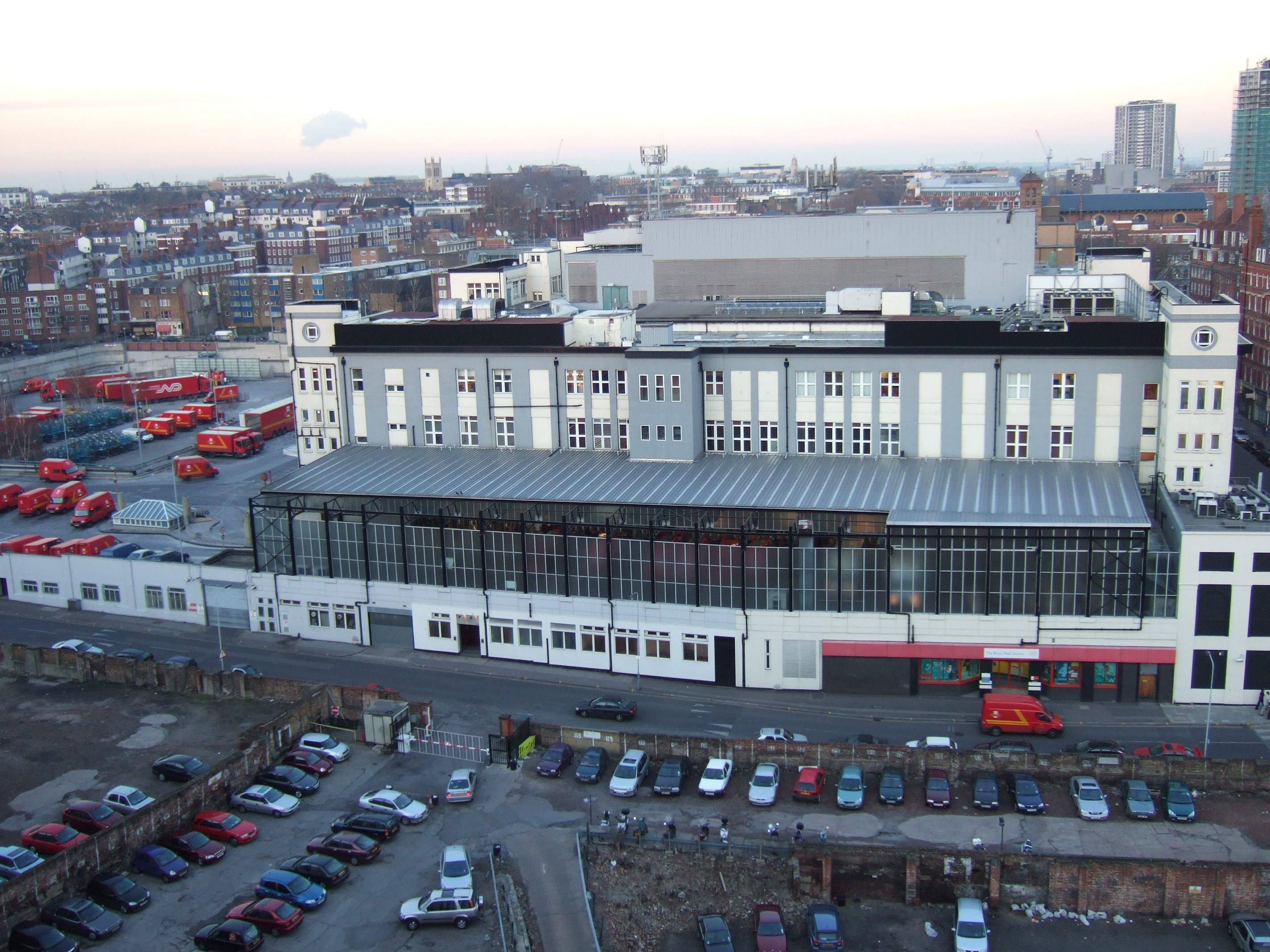
Royal Mail, headquartered in London, operates the Royal Mail Mount Pleasant Sorting Office (pictured), London's largest mail sorting office.

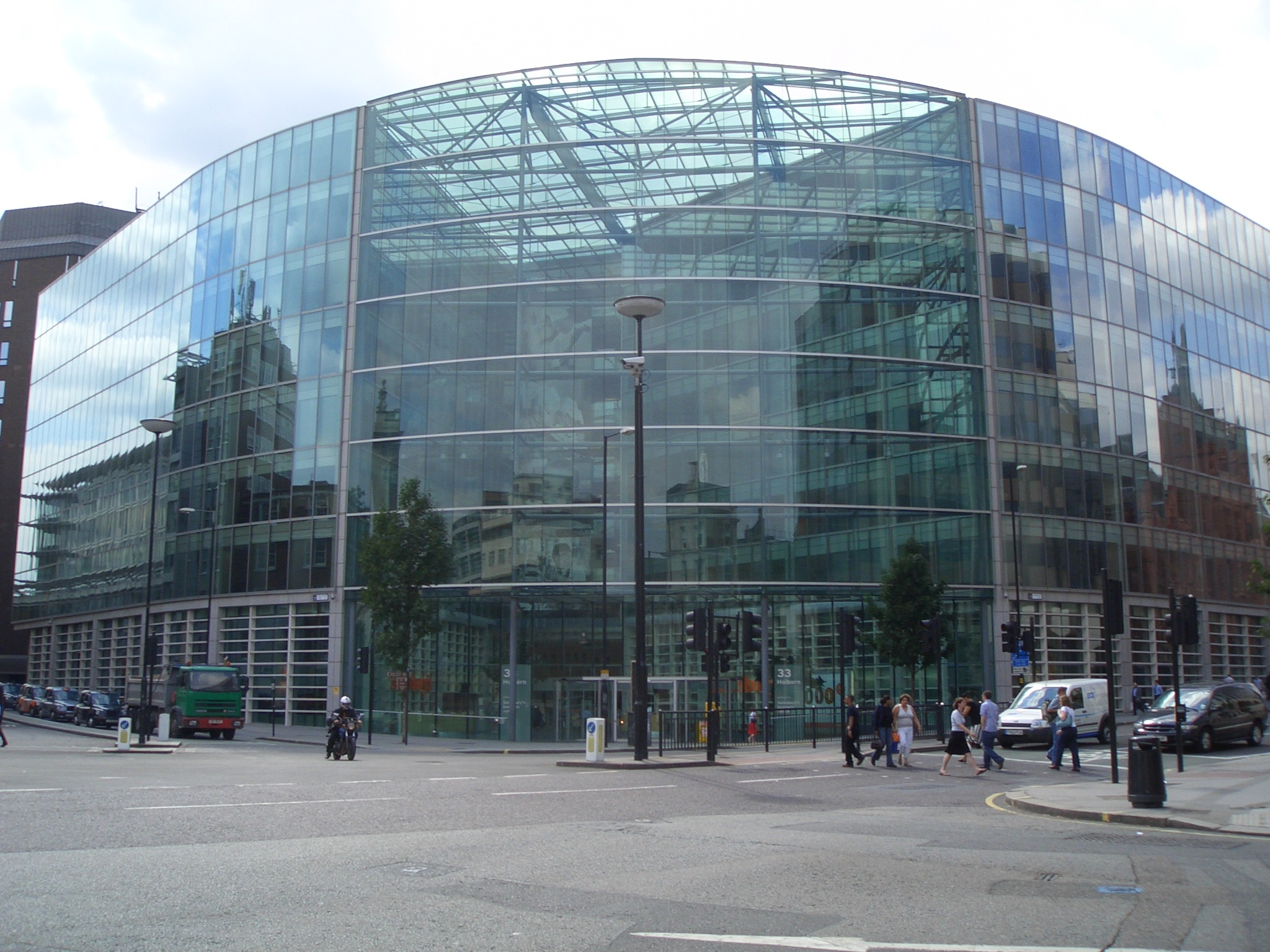
Sainsbury's former headquarters at Holborn Circus, in Holborn London

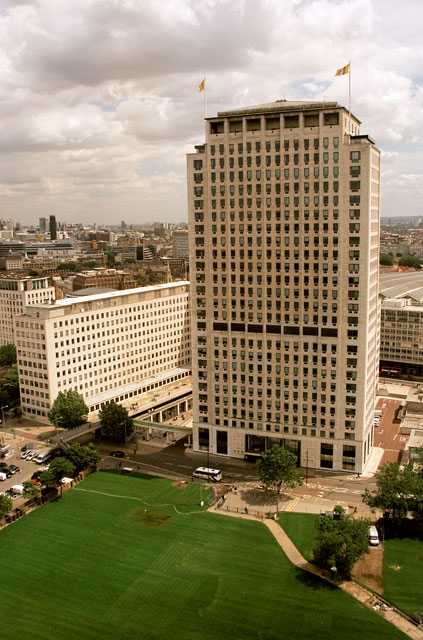
The Shell Centre building in London. Shell plc is headquartered in London at the Shell Centre.

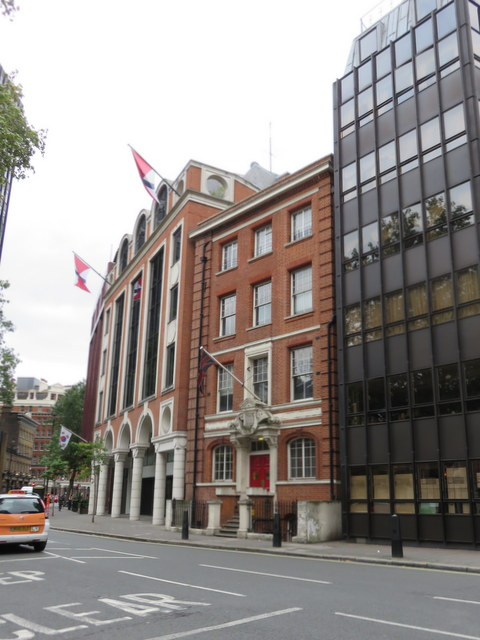
Swire headquarters, Swire House

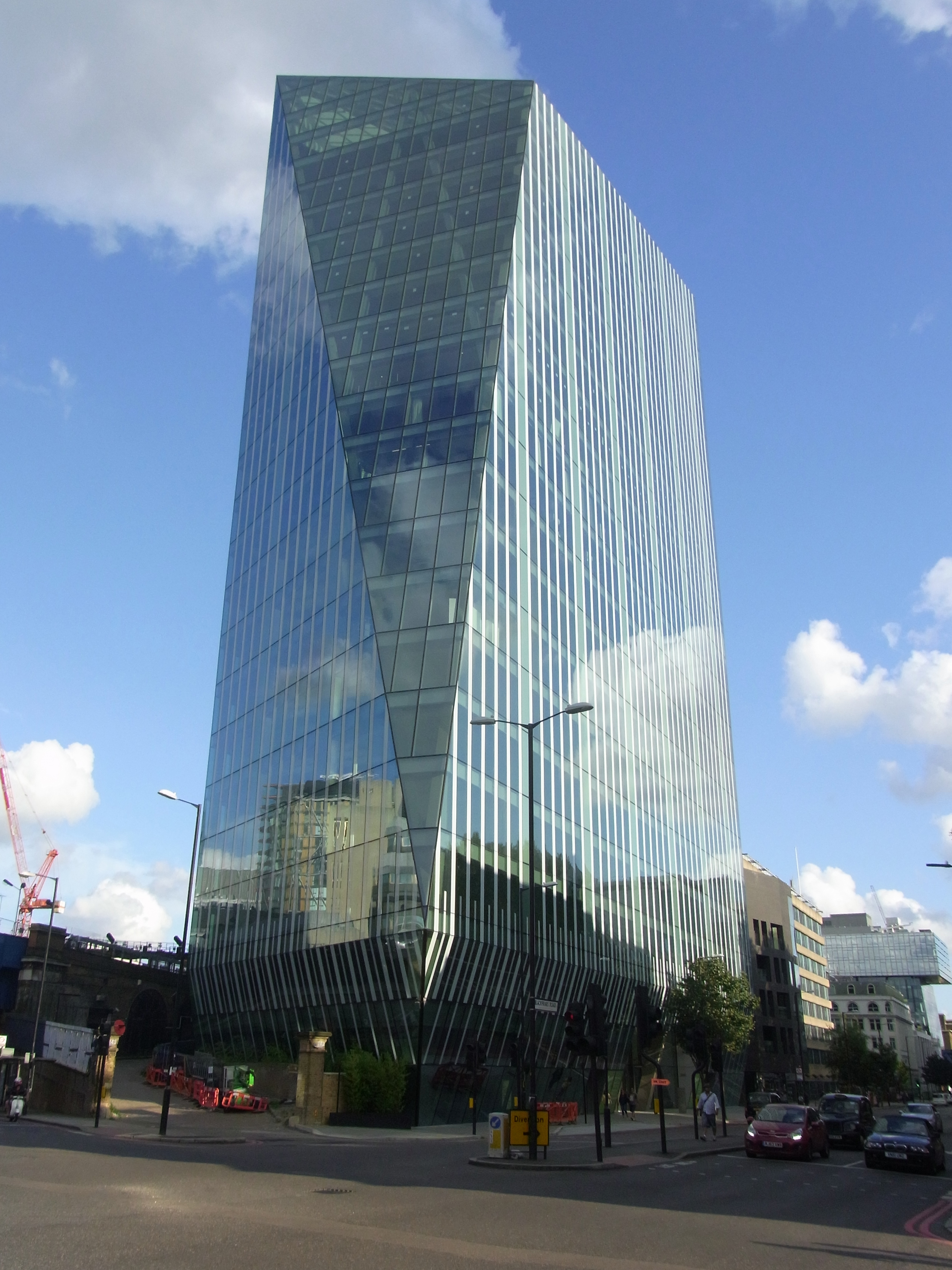
Informa headquarters in London

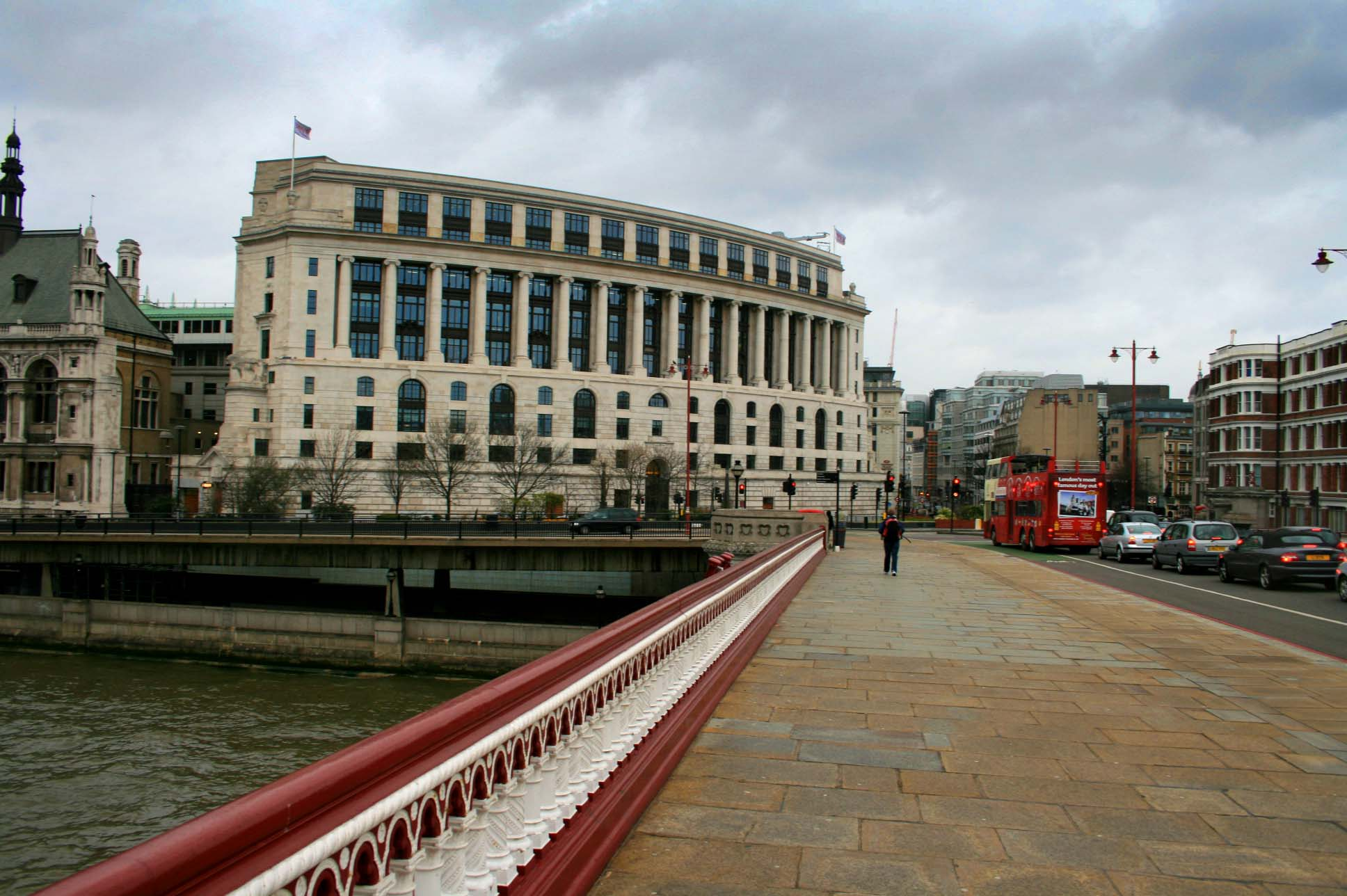
Unilever House in London, the headquarters of Unilever

=== A ===
- A & C Black
- Abbey (coachbuilder)
- ABK Architects
- Above the Title Productions
- Accident Advice Helpline
- Acrylicize
- Actis Capital
- Adastra Minerals
- Adenza
- Addison Lee
- Adfonic
- Agricultural & General Engineers
- Ainsworths
- Airtel Africa
- AKO Capital
- Alferon Management
- Alfred McAlpine
- Algebris
- All3Media
- Andrew Melrose
- Angel Trains
- Anglo American
- Antony Gibbs & Sons
- AnyJunk
- Aon
- Apax Partners
- Arcadia Group
- ArenaPAL
- Argos
- Aricom
- Armajaro
- Art Loss Register
- Artech House
- Artists' Collecting Society
- Arup
- Asante Capital
- Ascential
- Ashmore Group
- Ashtead Group
- ASOS
- Associated British Foods
- Atelier One
- Atlantic Books
- Atlantica
- Atomic Antelope
- Avanti West Coast
- Aviva
- Avocet Mining
- Avolites

=== B ===
- Bad Press
- BAE Systems
- Bakkavör
- Balderton Capital
- Balfour Beatty
- Banijay Entertainment
- Banijay UK Productions
- Barclays
- BATS Chi-X Europe
- BBA Aviation
- BBC
- BBC Film
- BBC Records
- BBC Studios
- BBC Worldwide
- The Bedford Estate
- Bedlam Productions
- Bejam
- Belen Echandia
- Bell Pottinger
- Belle & Bunty
- Bentley & Skinner
- Berendsen
- Berry Brothers & Rudd
- Bestinvest
- Bestway
- Beta 2 Limited
- Beyond Retro
- BioMed Central
- Black Swan Data
- Bleep
- Blink
- Bloomsbury Publishing
- Blue
- Blue Rubicon
- Bluebay Asset Management
- BMJ Group
- Boden
- Bodyamr
- Boeing UK
- Boosey & Hawkes
- Boost ETP
- Bow & Arrow
- BP
- The Brand Union
- Brewin Dolphin
- Bridgeman Art Library
- Bridgepoint Capital
- Bridges Fund Management
- BrightTALK
- Briglin Pottery
- Brit
- British Airways
- British American Tobacco
- British & Commonwealth Holdings
- British Energy
- British Home Stores
- British Land
- British Youth Council
- Brixton
- Brogan Group
- Bromcom
- Brompton Bicycle
- BT Group
- BTG
- BTR
- Buckmaster & Moore
- Bulgarian Dreams
- Bunzl
- Bupa
- Burford Capital
- Burton
- Business Consulting International

=== C ===
- Cad & the Dandy
- Cadbury
- Cake Entertainment
- Cape
- Capita
- Capita Symonds
- Capital Economics
- Carlisle Managed Solutions
- Carlton Carriage Co
- Carlton Communications
- Carnival Films
- Carter Jonas
- Carwow
- Cassell
- Centaur Media
- CeX
- Chamberlin, Powell & Bon
- ChangeGroup
- Channel 5 Broadcasting
- Channel Four Television Corporation
- Charles Stanley Group
- Charlotte Tilbury Beauty
- Charter International
- Cheapflights
- Chesham Amalgamations
- Cheyne Capital Management
- The Children's Investment Fund Management
- Chloride Group
- Churchill Insurance
- Cinven
- City of London Group
- Clément-Talbot
- Close Brothers Group
- CLS Holdings
- CMC Markets
- CMG
- Coats
- The Cobra Group
- Coin Street Community Builders
- Coller Capital
- CommuterClub
- CompAir
- ComRes
- Coolroom
- Co-operative Permanent Building Society
- Cosmos Holidays
- Cox & King
- Cox & Kings
- CPL Productions
- Creek Audio
- CronLab
- Current Publishing
- CurrencyTransfer.com
- CVC Capital Partners
- CWM FX

=== D ===
- Daejan Holdings
- Dahabshiil
- Daily Mail & General Trust
- Dalgety
- Damnably
- Darty
- DataCash
- Datamonitor
- DataWind
- Davenport Lyons
- Davis Langdon
- De Vere Group
- Dealogic
- Deliveroo
- Deloitte
- Derwent Capital Markets
- Dexion
- Diageo
- DIA-style.com
- Diploma
- Direct Ferries
- Diversified Global Graphics Group
- DJhistory.com
- DNEG
- Dods Group
- Dopplr
- Dorling Kindersley
- Dot2Dot
- Dr Scholl's
- Duke Street Capital
- Dune London
- Dunnhumby

=== E ===
- E-Clear
- Eastern Electricity
- East London Credit Union
- Eat
- Ebiquity
- ECA International
- Ecoigo
- Ecora Royalties
- Ecourier
- EdAid
- Ede & Ravenscroft
- EDF Energy
- EE
- Egerton Capital
- Eidos Interactive
- Eisler Capital
- Electronic Music Studios
- Elementis
- Emerald Energy
- EMI
- EMI Music Publishing
- Empresaria Group
- Endless (private equity)
- The Energy Group
- English Eccentrics
- Enodis
- Entertainment One UK
- Entertainment Rights
- eOffice
- Eon Digital Entertainment
- Eon Productions
- Erased Tapes Records
- Ergo ID
- Ernst & Young
- Eterniti Motors
- ETF Securities
- eToro
- European Group
- Eurotherm
- Evelyn Partners
- Evolution Group
- Evraz
- Excellion Capital
- Exco International
- Expedition Engineering

=== F ===
- Family Law in Partnership
- Farmdrop
- FDM Group
- Fever Media
- Fiat Chrysler Automobiles
- Fidessa
- Film4 Productions
- FilmFair
- FilmOn
- First Solution Money Transfer
- First Student UK
- Firstsource
- Floris of London
- Foster + Partners
- Forte Group
- Framestore
- Frances Lincoln Publishers
- Freddie Grubb
- Freeplay Energy
- Freestone and Webb
- Fremantle
- Fresnillo
- Friends Provident
- Fundsmith
- Future Shorts

=== G ===
- Galliford Try
- Gapforce
- Gartmore Group
- Gas Light & Coke Company
- GCM Resources
- Gem Diamonds
- General Eyewear
- Generation Investment Management
- George Bell & Sons
- George Wimpey
- Gestetner
- GFMS
- Glaxo Wellcome
- Global Media & Entertainment
- Globe Investment Trust
- GMW Architects
- GoCardless
- GoHenry
- The Goldsmiths' Company Assay Office
- Good Relations
- Graff Diamonds
- Granada plc
- Graphite Capital
- Greensill Capital
- Greenwich Leisure Limited
- G-Research
- Grosvenor Group
- Grovepoint Capital
- GSA Capital
- GSK
- Guardian Assurance Company
- Guardian Royal Exchange Assurance
- Gunter's Tea Shop

=== H ===
- H.R. Owen
- Hall & Partners
- Hammerson
- Hammonds
- Hand in Hand Fire & Life Insurance Society
- Hanna-Barbera Studios Europe
- Hardy Amies
- Hardy Oil and Gas
- HarperCollins
- Hart, Son, Peard and Co.
- Hassle
- Hat Trick Productions
- Havas Digital
- Hays
- Heathrow Airport Holdings
- Heidelberg Materials UK
- Helpling
- Henderson Group
- Henry Poole & Co
- Heron International
- Hetchins
- HHCL
- Hi-Gen Power
- Higgs & Hill
- Hikma Pharmaceuticals
- Hilco Capital
- Hinduja Group
- Hirst Research Centre
- HIT Entertainment
- HMV
- Hodge Jones & Allen
- Hogan Lovells
- Holdsworth
- Holland, Hannen & Cubitts
- Holloway Brothers
- Hooper's Telegraph Works
- Horniman's Tea
- Horse Powertrain
- Houlihan Lokey
- House of Fraser
- Howden Joinery
- HSBC
- Hungry Bear Media
- Hungryhouse
- Hunting
- Huntsworth
- Hyperoptic

=== I ===
- ICM Research
- IG Group
- Imagini
- Imperial Continental Gas Association
- Imperial Innovations
- Ince Gordon Dadds
- Inchcape
- Information Security Forum
- Inmarsat
- Intermediate Capital Group
- International Computers Limited
- International Distribution Services
- International Power
- International Tea Co. Stores
- Intertek
- Invensys
- IP Group
- Ipsos MORI
- Isokon
- ITN
- ITV
- ITV Studios
- Iwoca

=== J ===
- J & A Beare
- J. and G. Rennie
- J&W Nicholson & Co
- Jardine Lloyd Thompson
- Jellyfish Pictures
- Jessica Kingsley Publishers
- Jestico + Whiles
- JKX Oil & Gas
- John Laing Group
- John Murray (publisher)
- John Penn and Sons
- Johnson Banks
- Johnson Matthey
- Justgiving

=== K ===
- Kantar TNS
- Kaplan Financial
- Kaupthing Singer & Friedlander
- Keith Prowse
- Keller Group
- Kennedys Law
- Kesslers International Group
- Keystone Law
- Kind Consumer
- Kingfisher
- Knight Frank
- Kold Sweat Records

=== L ===
- L.K.Bennett
- Ladbrokes Coral
- Laird
- Lamson Engineering
- Language Connect
- Lasmo
- Last.fm
- LatinNews
- Lattice Group
- Law Debenture
- Leading Edge Forum
- Lebrecht Photo Library
- Left Bank Pictures
- Legal & General
- Lendable
- Levitt Bernstein
- Lewis & Co
- Lewis Leathers
- Lewis Recordings
- Liberty Global
- Limmer Holdings
- Linklaters
- Lionsgate UK
- Lledo
- LLM Communications
- Lloyd Johnson
- Lloyds Banking Group
- London Borough of Jam
- London Capital Credit Union
- London Climate Change Agency
- The London Distillery Company
- London Necropolis Company
- London Stock Exchange Group
- London Studio
- LondonMetric Property
- Long Tall Sally Clothing
- Lonmin
- Loose Music
- Love Productions
- Lucas Brothers
- Luther Pendragon

=== M ===
- Mace
- Man Group
- Marex Spectron
- Marjan Television Network
- Markit
- Marks & Clerk
- Marks & Spencer
- Masabi
- Mathmos
- Maxwell Communications Corporation
- McBride
- Mecom Group
- Mediatonic
- Medical Research Council Technology
- Melrose Industries
- MEPC
- Mercury Asset Management
- Merlin Entertainments
- Merman
- Metaswitch
- Methuen Publishing
- Metropolis International
- MFI
- M&G
- MG Motor
- MHP Communications
- Microplas
- Millennium & Copthorne Hotels
- Millhouse Capital
- Minerva
- Mintel
- Misys
- Mitie
- Mitre Sports International
- MJP Architects
- Mobico Group
- Modella Capital
- Moley Robotics
- Molton Brown
- Mondi Group
- Monex Europe
- Moneycorp
- Monington & Weston
- Moonbug Entertainment
- Morgan Crucible
- Morgan Sindall
- Morrison Facilities Services
- Moss Empires
- Mott MacDonald
- Mousebreaker
- Mushroom TV
- MWB Group Holdings
- My Family Care
- My Local Bobby
- MySociety

=== N ===
- Nails
- National Benzole
- National Freight Corporation
- National Grid
- NatWest
- NBNK
- Nelsons
- New Moon
- News UK
- Newsquest
- NEX Group
- Nexfibre
- Nimax Theatres
- Nobrow Press
- Northern & Shell
- Norton Rose Fulbright
- Nothing
- Now Play It
- NTT Communications

=== O ===
- Objective Media Group
- Odeon Cinemas
- Odeon Cinemas Group
- Odyssey Airlines
- OmniCompete
- Omnifone
- OnlyFans
- OpenBet
- Ophir Energy
- Opinium Research
- Optimax
- Outsights
- Ovum
- Oxbridge Applications

=== P ===
- PA Consulting
- Palace Software
- Panmure Gordon & Co.
- Pantheon Ventures
- Paramount International Networks
- Paramount Networks UK & Australia
- Park Royal Partnership
- Pearn, Pollinger & Higham
- Pearson
- Peek Freans
- Penguin Books
- Penguin Random House
- Perenco
- Peruvian Corporation
- Pfizer UK
- PH Media Group
- Phaidon Press
- Phillips & Drew
- Phoenix Group
- Pimlico Plumbers
- Pinchin Johnson & Associates
- Playfish
- Plus500
- P&O Princess Cruises
- Pod Point
- Portland Communications
- Pottermore
- Premier Farnell
- Premier Oil
- Pressparty
- PwC
- Progressive Digital Media
- Prudential

=== Q ===
- QA
- Qiqqa
- Qube Software
- Quercus
- Quilter

=== R ===
- Rapha
- Rara.com
- Rare Tea Company
- Rathbones
- Reaktion Books
- Red Bee Media
- Reed
- Reed Elsevier
- Regal Global Entertainment
- Remarkable Entertainment
- Rentokil Initial
- Resolution
- The Restaurant Group
- Rêve En Vert
- Rexam
- Reynolds Porter Chamberlain
- Rigby & Peller
- Rio Tinto
- RjDj
- Roberson Wine
- Robert Fleming & Co
- Robert Walters
- Rockstar London
- Rocksteady Studios
- Rolls-Royce Holdings
- Rothmans International
- Rothschild & Co
- Royal Exchange Assurance Corporation
- Royal London Asset Management
- Royal Mail
- RSA Insurance Group
- RSM International
- Rushes Postproduction
- RusPetro
- Russell & Bromley

=== S ===
- Sainsbury's
- Salamander Energy
- Salviati
- Samuel Enderby & Sons
- Samvo Group
- Sanne Group
- Santander UK
- Satellite Information Services
- Savills
- Scarlet Blade Theatre
- Schroders
- SCi Games
- Science Photo Library
- Sears
- Securicor
- Sedgwick Group
- See Tickets
- Select Model Management
- Sellar Property Group
- Sense Worldwide
- Seraphine
- Service in Informatics and Analysis
- SG Warburg & Co
- Shaftesbury
- Sharps Pixley
- Shed Media
- Shell
- Shutl
- Siebe Gorman
- Siebe
- Signet Jewelers
- Signwave
- Silchester International Investors
- Silence Therapeutics
- Silver Circle
- SilverDoor
- Simmons & Simmons
- Sinclair Research
- Sir Robert McAlpine
- Sister
- Skinny Candy
- Sky Group
- Sky Studios
- Sky UK
- Sky Vision
- Slater & Gordon
- Slaughter & May
- Smith & Nephew
- Smiths Gore
- Smiths Group
- Sobranie
- SOCO International
- Sony Ericsson
- Spire Healthcare
- Splash Damage
- Sporting Index
- Spread Co
- Square Enix Europe
- SSL International
- St Giles International
- Stainer & Bell
- Standard Chartered
- Standard Telephones and Cables
- Stanton Williams
- Stemcor
- SThree
- Storehouse
- Studio Lambert
- Sun Life & Provincial Holdings
- Survation
- SVG Capital
- Swaine London
- Swan Song Records
- Swire
- System Simulation

=== T ===
- Takeover/Cloud 9
- Takeover Entertainment
- Talkback
- Talkback Thames
- TalkTalk Group
- Tanner Krolle
- Tata Steel Europe
- Tate & Lyle
- Tate Publishing
- Taxi Media
- Taylor Wimpey
- Taylor Woodrow
- TD Tom Davies
- TDR Capital
- TelecityGroup
- Telecom Plus
- Telewest
- TestPlant
- Thames
- Thames & Hudson
- Thames Water Authority
- Theodore Goddard
- THG Sports
- Thomas Cook & Son
- Thomsons Online Benefits
- Thorn Electrical Industries
- Thorn EMI
- Thurleigh Investment Managers
- Tilda
- Tomkins
- Touch Surgery
- Tower Hamlets Summer University
- TowerBrook Capital Partners
- TP ICAP
- Tradus
- Trafalgar House
- Trainline
- Transmeridian Air Cargo
- Transmission Recordings
- Travers Smith
- Trinity Mirror
- Trowers & Hamlins
- Trustee Savings Bank
- Tullett Prebon
- Tullow Oil
- TV Pixie

=== U ===
- Ubiquity Press
- UBM
- UCB Home Loans
- UCL Business
- Ugly Models
- UK Youth Parliament
- UKTV
- Ultramar
- Underbelly
- Unilever
- Union Hand-Roasted Coffee
- United Biscuits
- United International Pictures
- United Kingdom Accreditation Service
- Universal Global Television
- Universal Television Alternative Studio UK

=== V ===
- Varsity Express
- Vedanta Resources
- Venturethree
- Versailles Group
- Vesuvius
- Viagogo
- Virgin EMI Records
- Virgin Group
- Virtual Internet
- VMware

=== W ===
- The Walt Disney Company Limited
- Warner Bros. Discovery International
- Warner Bros. International Television Production
- Warner Bros. Television Studios UK
- Web Technology Group
- Webb Ellis
- WebsEdge
- Whitehead Mann
- WHSmith
- WildBrain CPLG
- WildBrain London
- Wildsmith Shoes
- William Hill
- William Watkins
- Williams Lea
- Willis Group
- Wonga.com
- The Woolwich
- Workspace Group
- World Productions
- World Television
- WPP

=== X ===
- Xchanging

=== Y ===
- Yeast Culture
- YossarianLives

=== Z ===
- zooplus
- Z/Yen

== Newspapers published in London ==
- Al-Arab
- Bangla Mirror
- Barking & Dagenham Post
- Bell's Life in London
- Catholic Herald
- Christian Today
- The Guardian
- The Illustrated London News
- The Irish Post
- Lanka Tribune
- Lloyd's List
- The Muslim Weekly
- The Non-League Paper
- Romford Recorder
- South London Press
- The Tablet
- Town and Country Magazine
- The War Cry

== See also ==
- List of pubs in London
- List of restaurants in London
- Category:Defunct companies based in London
- Category:Organisations based in London
