= Carlisle Managed Solutions =

Recruitment process outsourcing company

Guidant Group
- Company type: Private
- Industry: Recruitment
- Founded: 1997
- Headquarters: London, UK
- Key people: Julia Robertson
- Parent: Impellam Group plc
- Website: http://www.guidantgroup.com/

Guidant Group is a Recruitment Process Outsourcing Company.

== History ==
Originally part of Carlisle Group, which was formed in 1997 around the UK recruitment and cleaning interests of Lord Ashcroft's Belize registered holding company for the Belize Bank.

The company originated from the recruitment agency, Tate, created to meet a growing demand for managed recruitment solutions. Gill Stewart, the founding Managing Director grew the company to its current size of £80 million turnover and 80 employees.

Demerged and listed on the Alternative Investment Market in 2007, in May 2008 Carlisle Group and Corporate Services Group merged to form Impellam Group.

In May 2014, Carlisle Managed Solutions rebranded to join with their North American company, to form Guidant Group.

In October 2018 Guidant Group merged with another Impellam Group company, Bartech to form Guidant Global.
