= Bow & Arrow =

British company

- Founded: 2009
- Founders: Natasha Chetiyawardana; Ben Slater
- Headquarters: Soho Square; London, W1; United Kingdom
- Website: bowandarrow.com

Bow & Arrow is a growth consultancy and professional services company based in London. The company was founded in 2009 by Natasha Chetiyawardana and Ben Slater under the name FH Innovation Ltd. In November 2011 the organisation was renamed to Bow & Arrow Ltd, and is currently based in Soho Square.

Former clients for Bow & Arrow include Google, Barclays and Carphone Warehouse, with tasks such as providing different processes and tools into many juxtaposing organisations. For example, introducing new technologies, developing new coaching skills or generating new ideas.

In 2015, Bow & Arrow was awarded bronze in the Service Design category at the DBA Design Effectiveness Awards for their design of Pin Point, "the UK's first tablet-based customer experience in a high street store".

== See also ==
- Accounting networks and associations
- List of companies based in London
- Professional services networks
