= Farmdrop =

Defunct online grocer

- Industry: Food
- Founded: 2012; 14 years ago
- Founder: Ben Pugh
- Defunct: 17 December 2021; 4 years ago
- Fate: Bankrupted
- Headquarters: London, England
- Area served: London
- Key people: Eleanor Herrin, CEO
- Products: Foods
- Services: Online grocer – food ordering and delivery
- Revenue: £3.9 M (2018)
- Number of employees: 214 (2020)

Farmdrop was an online grocer with a focus on farm-to-table food sourced from local farmers, fishermen, and other producers; as well as ethically sourced household products.

On 17 December 2021 Farmdrop collapsed following a failure to secure additional funding.

== History ==
Farmdrop was founded by Ben Pugh, a former stockbroker for Morgan Stanley, in 2012. In December 2015, the company had 20 employees, and in April 2016 worked with around 80 food producers. As of April 2018, it was working with 450 producers. Farmdrop had a mobile app that consumers used to interface with the company.

The earliest work in forming Farmdrop began with Pugh meeting local farmers at their farms to acquire prospective producers to work with the company. Various foods including organic foods could be ordered online and delivered. Farmers and fishermen received a higher percentage of the retail price using Farmdrop because no middlemen were involved in the supply chain. (Note: "As of 2016, farmers and producers were given an average of 70 per cent of sale revenue through Farmdrop as opposed to 30 per cent from supermarkets.") In March 2017, the company had around 30,000 active users.

In 2016, the company received £3 million in funding. In April 2017, the company received another £7 million. In June 2018, the company raised another £10 million.

In September 2016, Farmdrop began providing its "Farmology" education campaign, which provided information to consumers about the origins of foods.

In March 2019, an ad from the company featuring a mix of fresh produce, bacon, eggs and butter, was rejected by TfL due to its updated regulation on high in fat, sugar and salt foods and how they are advertised in the London Underground. A debate ensued, with Farmdrop raising questions around the scoring system used to determine what is healthy food. The company declared it fully supported "preventing brands from aggressively advertising junk food to children".

In December 2021, the company collapsed due to the inability to secure sufficient capital to continue operating.

== See also ==
- List of companies based in London
- Local food
