= CommuterClub =

British financial services company

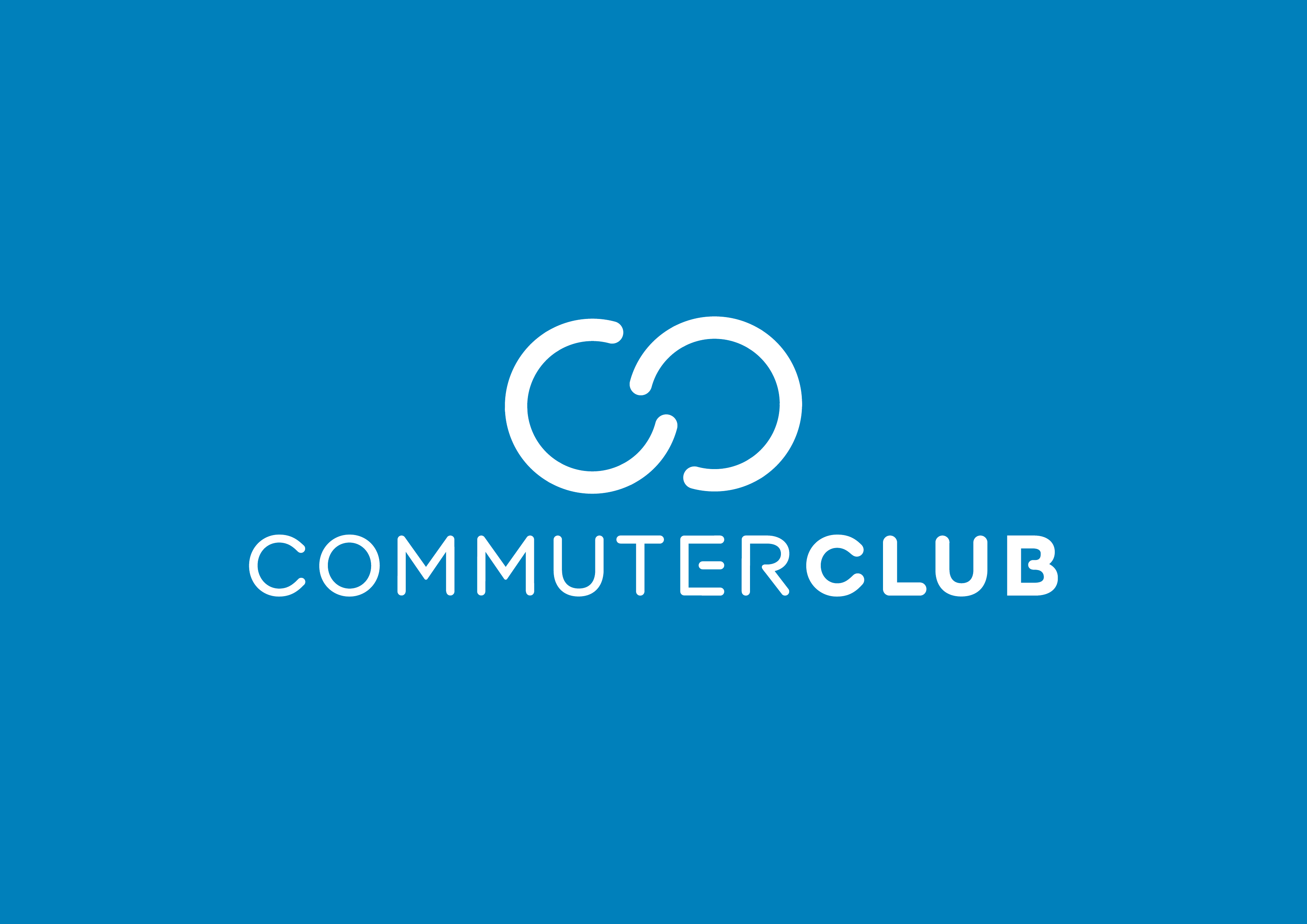
- Website type: Private
- Available in: Multilingual
- Founded: 2013
- Dissolved: February 28, 2023
- Headquarters: London, {{{location_country}}}
- Area served: England
- Founders: Petko Plachkov, Imran Gulamhuseinwala, Irina Iovita
- Key people: Petko Plachkov (Founder); Imran Gulamhuseinwala (Founder, Chairman); Irina Iovita (Managing Director)
- Industry: Financial services
- Services: Financing, Travel, E-commerce
- Employees: 10-50 (2016)
- Website: www.commuterclub.co.uk (Dead as of August 2023)
- Registration: Yes
- Current status: Liquidation

CommuterClub (also known as Commuter Club) was a UK-based financial services company that provided loans for annual season tickets, allowing commuters to pay for them in monthly instalments. CommuterClub was founded in 2013 by Petko Plachkov and Imran Gulamhuseinwala. Imran was honoured for his work in the FinTech industry in January 2017 in the Queen's Honour list with an OBE.

On March 25, 2022, CommuterClub announced that it was ceasing sales to new customers and renewals to current customers, due to the effect of COVID-19 on the rail industry.

In January 2023, the company was declared insolvent, and commencement of wind-up began on 28 February 2023.

== History ==
CommuterClub was founded by Petko Plachkov and Imran Gulamhuseinwala after they met while working in financial services at Resolution. They found through a Freedom of Information request to TfL that fewer than 10% of the 2.5 million people travelling around the capital each day benefit from the savings of season tickets. Following this finding, they created a monthly payment plan to offer access to annual season tickets for public transport. CommuterClub raised £2.3 million in a funding round in 2017, with backers including British tennis player Andy Murray.

== Corporate ==
CommuterClub also worked with SMEs to help them offer season tickets to staff as an employee benefit. CommuterClub automated the management of a season ticket scheme reducing cost and outsourcing traditionally payroll managed solution. Clients included Croydon Council, Airbnb and IntegraFin.

== Recognition ==
In 2014 CommuterClub was named Startup of the Week in Wired Magazine as well as having won at the Startups Awards for Service Business of the Year and the Everline Real Business Awards for Disruptor of the Year. CommuterClub also made FinTechCity's FinTech 50 in 2015.
