= EdAid =

British funding platform for higher education

- Industry: FinTech, Student Finance, Charity, Non-Profit
- Founder: Tom Woolf
- Headquarters: London, SW1E; United Kingdom
- Website: http://www.edaid.com/

EdAid is a funding platform for higher education, based in the United Kingdom, with offices in Dubai, London, New YorK, Sydney and Toronto. EdAid partnered with university and professional schools to defer tuition payment, interest-free.

== History ==
EdAid was founded by Tom Woolf (CEO), the former Mission Chief of JustGiving Middle East and Africa and Accenture Financial Services Strategy alumni. EdAid received regulatory approval from the Financial Conduct Authority (FCA; formerly the FSA) in February 2016 and was launched in March 2016.

== Process ==
EdAid ensures that students and their education provider have shared risk, shared reward model that builds greater level of equity into Higher Education. The Platform is regulated by the Financial Conduct Authority which ensures that students are validated through a three-phase process that includes identity, fraud and AML checks, before starting an application. Students must be on a UK, US, Canadian or Australian accredited course with the permanent right to remain in their country of study after graduation.

EdAid has offices in the United Kingdom, United States of America, Canada, Ireland, the United Arab Emirates and Australia, and aim to fund 10,000 students in 2020, typically doubling household income for the students it funds.

== Fees ==
EdAid charges a technology and processing fee to the education provider and zero fees to the student. Repayments are pegged to the rate of the Consumer Price Index without additional interest charges. Students will typically start to repay 10% of their monthly salary after they graduate and are in full-time employment, although EdAid also offers some regular payment plans on certain courses.

== EdAid Foundation ==
The EdAid Foundation is a UK-registered charity that provides matched funding from corporations, trusts, high net-worth individuals and alumni.

== See also ==
- Peer-to-peer lending
- Higher education
- Crowdfunding
- Student loans in the United Kingdom
