= Rêve En Vert =

Online luxury boutique

- Industry: Fashion
- Founded: 2013
- Founders: Cora Hilts & Natasha Tucker
- Headquarters: London, UK
- Area served: Global
- Products: Sustainable Luxury; womenswear, accessories, jewellery, homeware, beauty products.
- Website: reve-en-vert.com

Rêve En Vert is an online luxury boutique focusing on high-end sustainable products. It has been referred to as "the Net-a-Porter of sustainable fashion." Currently the e-commerce site comprises womenswear, accessories and jewellery, as well as organic homeware and beauty products.

== History ==
Rêve En Vert was founded in 2013 by Cora Hilts and Natasha Tucker and was born from a blog that Hilts started during her Masters course in Environmental Politics and Sustainability.

== Products ==
The e-commerce site stocks a selection of brands that are in line with its sustainable ethos, including "re-made" British bags from Christopher Raeburn, womenswear pieces from Svilu as well as jewellery from Pamela Love. It also possesses a line of organic Pima cotton basics and a line of beach resort wear.
