= European Group =

Company based in London

European Group Ltd.
- Company type: Private company
- Genre: Precious Metal Management
- Founded: 2004 in London, United Kingdom
- Headquarters: Frankfurt am Main, Germany
- Area served: Worldwide
- Key people: John Roberts (CEO); Jake Perosh (CFO); Anthony Miller (COO); Audrey Newton (Vice President)
- Website: europeangroup.com

European Group Ltd is a holding company that owns strategic business units across the precious metal vertical markets. The Group presently consists of GoldUnion, BullionExchange, and UK Bullion, with operations stretching across Europe, North America and Asia.

== Company history ==
Founded in 2004, European Group began its operations supplying investment-grade precious metals to localized brick and mortar retailers within the United Kingdom. Its business grew rapidly, and by 2006 it had established presences in France, Germany, Portugal, The Netherlands and Switzerland, and supplying to retailers in the rest of Europe through secondary distributors.

In 2009, driven by the surge in demand for precious metal investments at the peak of the financial crisis, European Group embarked on a major expansion move, relocating its head office to Frankfurt am Main, Germany, in line with its logistical requirements for efficient distribution from a central location in Europe. It started UK Bullion to further expand its wholesales distribution operations beyond the borders of Europe, transforming European Group Ltd into the holding company. The same year the Group sets its sights on the flourishing retail markets and expanded its operations into direct retail through two new business units added to the European Group's growing corporate family, BullionExchange which serves the precious metal retail segments throughout Europe, and GoldUnion which caters to the retail markets outside the EU.

GoldUnion grew along with the extended reach of UK Bullion, which has penetrated the North American distribution markets by 2011, the Group now has access to markets in Canada and US. With growing market affluence across Asia, the Group is set to established its first presence in Asia led by GoldUnion in 2013, with the aim of developing the Asia Pacific retail precious metal markets.

== Timeline ==
2004 – European Group Ltd founded in London, United Kingdom
2006 – Expanded distribution network throughout Europe
2009 – Started business units: GoldUnion, BullionExchange and Uk Bullion
2011 – Entered retail markets in North America
2013 – Established presence in Asia
