= Atomic Antelope =

Publisher

- Type: Private
- Industry: Publishing
- Founded: 2009
- Defunct: March 8, 2017
- Headquarters: London, UK
- Products: Books

Atomic Antelope Ltd. was a digital book publisher. The company was best known for producing Alice for the iPad, a popular adaptation of Lewis Carroll's Alice in Wonderland. The iPad adaptation caused significant controversy in the press and literary circles, The New York Times initially rallied against Alice for the iPad, claiming it prized interactivity over quiet reading and would change children's habits for the worse. Although Alice for the iPad was praised by Oprah Winfrey and Gizmodo, Atomic Antelope's then CEO, Chris Stevens, began a public feud with children's book publishers after the publication of an interview in Fast Company magazine in which Stevens told a reporter, "The paper publishers have clearly demonstrated that they have absolutely no acuity in the digital realm, and are stuck... Working with them is a waste of energy. Imagine if Henry Ford had decided to team up with a horse stables to make the Model T."

== Company history ==
Atomic Antelope was founded in 2009 by former CNET journalist Chris Stevens and Ben Roberts. The company launched two minor titles for the iPhone before producing Alice for the iPad in March 2010. The book quickly became one of the most popular children's titles on the iPad platform. Roberts left the company in September 2010.

Atomic Antelope was disbanded in 2017.

== Culture ==
Atomic Antelope was an outspoken opponent of traditional publishers. When Alice for the iPad held the number one spot in the App Store, Atomic Antelope's CEO wrote an open letter to the industry in which he asked, "how did we, as if by magic, wrestle Disney and Marvel to the floor with a book that is over 145 years old?". The company also distanced itself from normal corporate structures, in 2010 Stevens told Fast Company magazine that "It's important to be aware that if you have ten people in a room, 8 of them have no interest beyond keeping their job secure, one is there to criticize everything they see, and then, there's you. So, most of the room is going to be against anything that is either A) new B) risky. Since A tends to equal B, you might as well ignore the opinion of everyone in any corporate environment."

== Publications ==
- Atomic Antelope (2009). Bauble (iPhone ed.). iTunes.
- Atomic Antelope (2009). Twitch Origins (iPhone ed.). iTunes.
- Atomic Antelope (2010). Alice for the iPad (iPad ed.). iTunes.
- Atomic Antelope (2011). Alice in New York (iPad ed.). iTunes.
- Atomic Antelope & ustwo Ltd. (2011). Nursery Rhymes with Storytime (iPad ed.). iTunes., an adaptation of Mother Goose Nursery Rhymes
