= Spread Co =

Betting and CFD provider based in the UK

- Company type: Private
- Industry: Financial services
- Founded: London, UK; 2006; 20 years ago
- Headquarters: London, UK
- Key people: Ajay Pabari (Founder/CEO)
- Services: On-line trading, CFDs, Spread Betting and Foreign Exchange
- Website: www.spreadco.com

Spread Co is a financial spread betting and CFD provider based in the UK. Spread Co's custom-built platform is built and developed in-house for both professional and retail clients to trade financial markets.

== History ==
In 2006, the former CMC Markets CFO, Ajay Pabari, founded Spread Co, as a specialist provider of CFDs. The concept was to create a platform that was both sophisticated and simple to use, and saw tremendous potential in offering this high quality trading platform worldwide.

2009 - Saw the introduction of Spread Betting

With the idea of filling certain gaps in the online retail trading space and the custom made focus. In 2009 Spread Co added Spread Betting to its list of products, integrated into one single platform 'Saturn'.

2010 - Competitive Spreads

In October 2010 Spread Co reduced its bid-offer spreads and started offering 0.8pt spreads for EURUSD, the UK100 and the US30 Index.

2017 - Bitcoin

Spread Co launched its first cryptocurrency product; 'Bitcoin Futures' available to trade for its spread betting account holders.

2018 - Spread Free Trading and Mini Markets

The Spread free account provides account holders access to selected Index and Forex markets, such as EURUSD, GBPUSD, UK100 and US30 all with zero spread on all opening and closing trades in line with the fair usage policy.

New ESMA regulations increased the minimum margin requirements for trading; with all clients in mind Spread Co launched a list of top 6 popular trading markets forming their 'Mini Markets' enabling clients to trade low stakes with smaller deposits.

== Operations ==
The London-based company has business overseas through partnerships in different countries, including the United Arab Emirates.

=== Trading platform and Account types ===
The company provides its services via in-house built Saturn trading platform. The platform can be accessed online via a web-based platform or via a mobile platform and is customisable. Spread Co also offers a demo platform enabling clients to familiarise themselves with the platform.

Spread Co offers two account types all tradable via one platform: Spread Betting Account and CFD Account.

=== Regulation ===
Spread Co is authorised and regulated by the Financial Conduct Authority (FCA) since October 2006. All client money is kept in a separate bank account, this is a requirement of the FCA's client asset rules.
