= London Borough of Jam =

Boutique jam manufacturer

Coordinates: 51.5531°N 0.0449°W

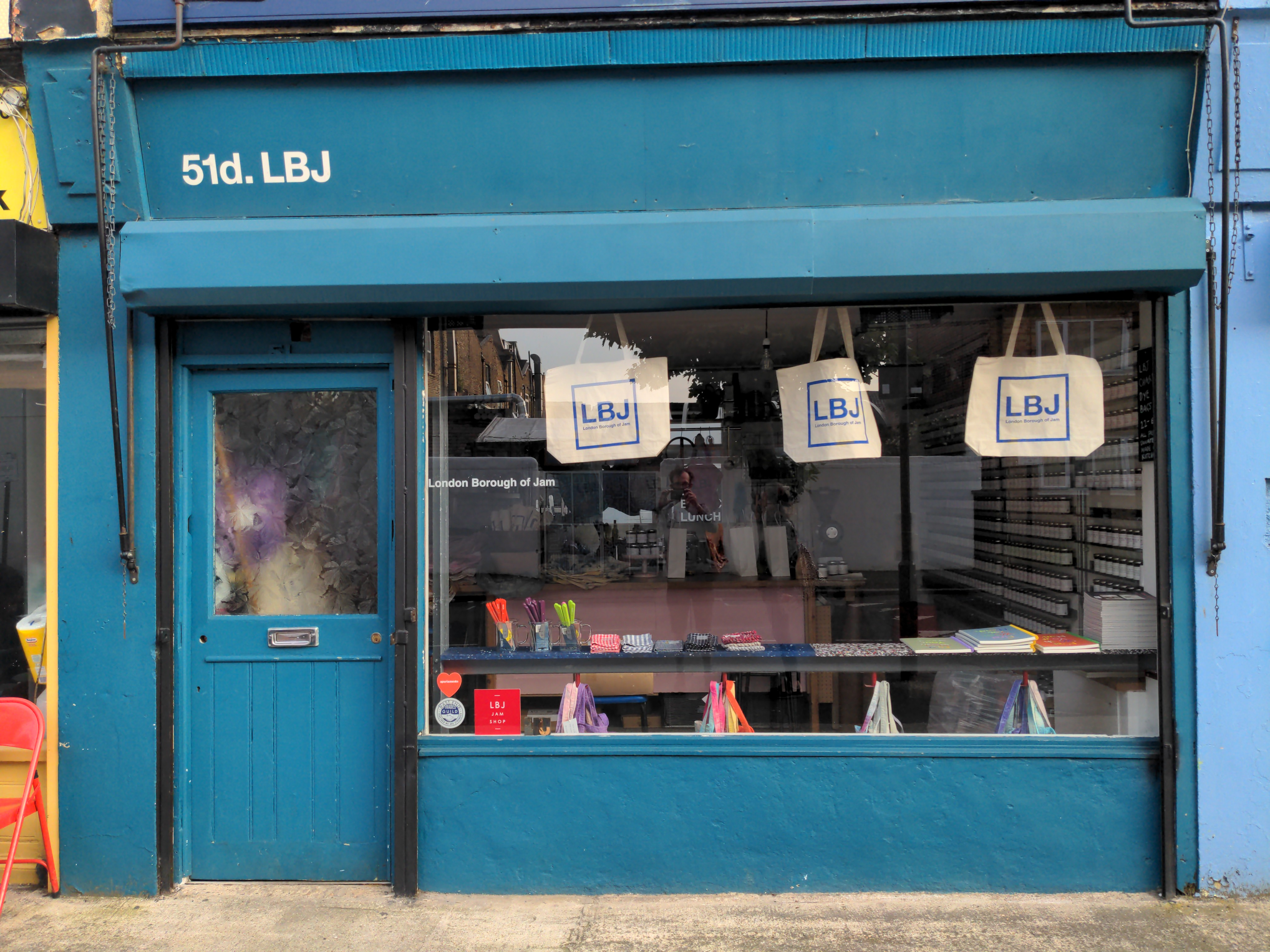
- Product type: Jam
- Current owner: Lillie O’Brien
- Country: United Kingdom
- Introduced: 2011
- Markets: United Kingdom; Singapore; Japan
- Website: www.londonboroughofjam.com

London Borough of Jam is a boutique jam manufacturer, based in Hackney, London established in 2011 by Lillie O’Brien, a former pastry chef at St John Bread & Wine.

The company produces artisan jams in small batches such as "Greengage & Fennel Pollen" and "Rhubarb & Cardamom", using less sugar than mainstream brands. Other ingredients used include loganberries from Kent, home-grown rose geranium and lemon verbena. The jams are stocked by independent retails in Greater London and a small number of shops across the UK. They are also stocked at the Royal National Theatre Shop. The jams and other core products are also distributed to Singapore and Japan, and in 2018 O’Brien travelled to Japan for two weeks running workshops and making limited edition pots of Fig & Earl Grey jam only available in Japan.

The company also operates a shop in Clapton, described in the London Evening Standard as a "dazzling and charming array of personally selected wares, in such a beautiful space" The shop sells magazines, homewares, speciality food and local spirits, with an emphasis on products produced in London.

In 2018, O'Brien wrote the cookbook Five Seasons Of Jam detailing jam recipes for spring, summer, early autumn, late autumn and winter. The recipes focus on lesser known ingredients including: Anise Hyssop leaves, Loganberries, Tayberries, Lemon Balm leaves and stalks, Jostaberries, Red Gooseberries, and Liva Fragola Grapes.

In 2020, during the pandemic, O'Brien put together the limited edition cookbook, First Wash Your Hands: Recipes from Friends, which compiled 120 recipes contributed by friends, with all proceeds going to the food charities Trussell Trust and the Young Leaders Fund.

== Bibliography ==
- Five Seasons Of Jam (Kyle Books, 2018) ISBN 9780857834393
- First Wash Your Hands: Recipes from Friends (London Centre for Book Arts, 2020)
