= New Moon (company) =

British film production company

New Moon is an independently owned film production company based in Soho, London. Founded in 1996 by Caroline Rowland, New Moon wrote and produced the films which helped to win the London bid for the 2012 Summer Olympics. The company went on to work for 3 more successful bids when Sochi won the 2014 Winter Olympics, Qatar won the right to host the 2022 FIFA World Cup and on 7 July 2011 as PyeongChang won their bid to host the 2018 Winter Olympics.

New Moon also develops and produces both fictional and documentary feature films with themes around sport and education. They are set for a cinematic release of romantic comedy Not Out and family adventure film Five Rings in 2012. The company also sponsors a Production Management scholarship at the National Film and Television School.

== Awards ==
- ‘Sport at Heart’ - New York festivals Grand Prix, IVCA Grand Prix and 24 other international awards
- ‘Inspiration’ – IVCA Gold and 4 other international awards
- ‘Belief’ – IVCA Gold and 6 other international awards
- ‘New Age of Travel’ – IVCA Gold and 2 other international awards
- Televisual Top 10 for 8 consecutive years
- ‘Hide and Seek’ - Sports Industry Awards Nomination
- ‘We are the people we’ve been waiting for’ – Clarion Award for Corporate Social Responsibility in Film
