= Byyd =

Defunct British mobile advertising company

byyd
- Type: Private
- Industry: Mobile advertising
- Founded: London, U.K. (2008)
- Founder: Victor Malachard, Paul Childs, Wesley Biggs
- Headquarters: London, U.K.
- Area served: Global

byyd (formerly Adfonic) was a mobile advertising buying platform that gave advertisers and agencies access to global mobile web and app inventory. It filed for administration in April 2016 and ceased trading a month later.

== History ==
The company was founded in 2008 by Victor Malachard, Paul Childs and Wesley Biggs, and the service launched in July 2009. It secured funding in 2010 and 2011, and in April 2011 was the only mobile advertising company to make the final Telegraph Tech Start Up 100 list. In December 2011, the company won 'Angel or VC-Backed Business of the Year' at the Startups Awards.

In October 2012, it released its mobile Demand-side Platform (DSP) called Madison.

== Rebranding ==
In March 2014 the company changed its name from Adfonic to byyd [sic]. As part of the rebrand, the company structured its areas of business around two offerings: software as a service solution byyd pro; and byyd media, a managed solution for planning and executing mobile ad campaigns.
