= DIA-style.com =

2012 fashion website based in London

- Company type: E-commerce
- Founded: 2012
- Headquarters: London
- Website: DIA-style.com

DIA-style.com was a social commerce website for fashion that focused on the Middle East.

The site was in Arabic and English and was best known as the first site offering Arabic speaking consumers the ability to shop online for ready-to-wear and accessories from luxury brands and designers in their own language.

There were over 50,000 ready-to-wear and non-apparel pieces from over 1,200 designers, with brands including Gucci, Lanvin, Fendi, Peter Pilotto, Mary Katrantzou and 3.1 Phillip Lim.

== History ==
DIA-style.com, launched in 2012, was based in London and was part of the DIA Digital a group of online businesses. It was a complementary sister site to DIA-BOUTIQUE.com, a marketplace that promoted ready-to-wear and accessories by independent designers from around the world.

DIA Digital and its constituent companies were founded by Rasha Khouri, an online fashion entrepreneur from the investment banking sector.
