= Coolroom =

Digital download store in UK

Coolroom Ltd
- Company type: Limited company
- Industry: Entertainment
- Founded: 2006
- Headquarters: London, United Kingdom
- Area served: United Kingdom
- Services: Multimedia digital entertainment download store
- Website: www.coolroom.com

Coolroom was a UK digital download store offering films and music to own and rent. It was accessible online and as a bespoke IPTV channel on Microsoft's Windows Media Center available on laptops, desktops and home entertainment PCs. Users could preview cinema releases and download full feature films and music.

Coolroom was highlighted as one of the few legal download services available in the UK at the time. Coolroom enabled users to download premium film and music content, and securely access it wirelessly within their home network with Intel Viiv enabled devices, as well as on Xbox 360. Downloaded films and music could also have been played on portable video and mp3 players.

== 3D Coolroom ==
Coolroom offered users a 3D virtual environment, styled around a loft apartment. Different areas allowed users to preview additional clips and cast interviews and upload personal content including music and pictures which could then be played and displayed in the apartment. In the latest version, users could also personalise the apartment and there were suggestions it was moving towards social networking where users would be able to invite friends into their Coolroom.

== Awards ==
Coolroom has been named in the "Britain's Digital Elite" awards sponsored by Real Business magazine and Microsoft. The service was highly commended in the "Taking on the Big Guys" category.
