= EOffice =

eOffice
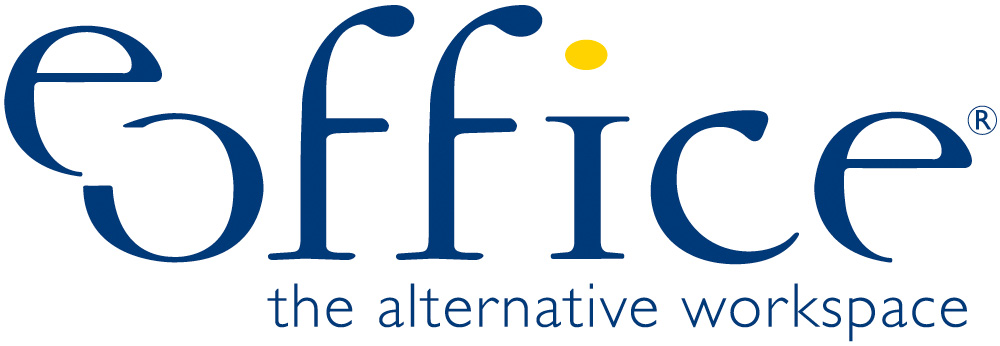
- Type: Private
- Industry: Coworking Spaces; Serviced Offices; Virtual Offices; Conference Venues
- Founded: 2002 by Pier Paolo Mucelli
- Headquarters: London, England, UK
- Key people: Pier Paolo Mucelli – CEO
- Website: eOffice.net

eOffice is a British company that provides shared workspaces and services for entrepreneurs, freelancers, startups, SMEs and scaleups. Operating from a number of centres in Central London, and affiliated with 250 business centres worldwide, the company has a presence in 60 countries. eOffice offers fully furnished serviced offices, coworking space, meeting and video conferencing rooms, and virtual offices.

== Design ==
Launched in 2002, the company has one of the first carbon neutral business centres worldwide and was winner of the British Council for Offices Innovation Awards 2007, BCO Regional Awards 2007 and 2008, and finalists in the FX Design and HSBC Startup Awards which awards recognise innovation in design and technology. Each centre is customised with artwork and photography from local artists, themed on the unique geography and landmarks of the local city or region.

They also offer a virtual reality conferencing solution built on the Second Life platform for long distance meetings.

== Strategy ==
eOffice employs a business strategy with a heavy emphasis on social media. The eOffice concept encourages clients to adopt a new business culture and way of work. To encourage networking, eOffice has groups and followings on LinkedIn, Twitter, Facebook, YouTube, Ning, Viadeo and XING.
