= Ainsworths =

British homeopathic company

Ainsworths (London) Ltd.
- Type: Private
- Industry: Homeopathy
- Founded: 1974
- Founder: John Ainsworth
- Headquarters: London, United Kingdom
- Services: Wholesale of pharmaceutical goods
- Revenue: £1,968,281 (as of 2015)
- Website: https://www.ainsworths.com

Ainsworths – formally registered as Ainsworths (London) Ltd – is a British limited company. It sells pseudoscientific remedies, and describes itself as specializing "in the making and provision of traditional homoeopathic remedies and the individual preparation of Bach flower remedies".

== History ==
The company's founder, John Ainsworth, had previously been a director of Nelsons, a homeopathic pharmacy. His new company was incorporated in 1974 as J.B.L. Ainsworth (Caterham) Ltd, and its first pharmacy opened in London in 1978. By 1989 the company had 56 employees. In 2009 the company changed to its current name.

The company has served a number of physicians of the British royal family and was granted Royal warrants by the Queen Mother, the Queen and Prince Charles.

Ainsworths is a member of the British Association of Homeopathic Manufacturers.

== Reception ==
In 2009 Ainsworths was cleared following an investigation by the Royal Pharmaceutical Society into its sale of homeopathic remedies for Swine flu, on the basis that the products were not sold by an organization registered with them.

In 2013, a BBC News investigation found that Ainsworths was willing to advise a reporter posing as a parent to use homeopathic remedies as an alternative to immunization against whooping cough.
