= My Family Care =

- Type: Limited Company
- Industry: Employee Benefits
- Founded: 14 August 2006
- Headquarters: London, England, UK
- Key people: Ben Black, CEO; Oliver Black, CEO; Amanda Coxen, CEO
- Website: www.myfamilycare.co.uk

My Family Care (previously Emergency Child and Home Care Ltd) is an employee benefits company based in the United Kingdom.

== History ==
My Family Care was founded by brothers Ben and Oliver Black in 2005 as a web-based service offering emergency childcare, eventually expanding to set up an elderly care service, and offer other family benefits. The Blacks had previously bought the nanny agency Tinies Childcare in 2000.

The company was acquired by Bright Horizons in 2019.

== Services ==
The company provides emergency childcare, back-up adult and eldercare, and school holiday cover, as well as additional services, such as a parental leave toolkit, coaching, a booking app, interactive tools, and educational videos. In 2008, over 350,000 employees in the UK had access to their services.

== Awards ==
The company has won several awards, including the Daily Telegraph's Trailblazers Award in 2007, and later in 2007 acquired BUPA’s corporate childcare division.
