= Ecoigo =

- Industry: Automotive
- Founded: 2006; 20 years ago
- Founder: Daniel Todary,
- Headquarters: Greater London, England
- Area served: Greater London
- Services: Minicab
- Website: www.ecoigo.com

Ecoigo is a London-based company which offers corporate taxicab, chauffeur and private hire in the United Kingdom. In April 2014 Ecoigo went into administration and was bought by WestOne Cars, which is owned by Addison Lee.

== The company ==
Co-founders Daniel Todary and Jonathan Broom set up Ecoigo in April 2006 as the ecologically sustainable alternative to pollution caused by public and private transport in central London. Ecoigo offer transport for individuals and businesses working towards zero emission transport across the capital. They are licensed by the Public Carriage Office, a division of the Mayor of London's office responsible for taxis, cabs and private hire in London.

== Environmental sustainability ==
Ecoigo engage in programmes of carbon offset as a means of promoting environmental sustainability. The company is partnered with The World Land Trust in promoting 'carbon positive' initiatives such as rainforest rescue to protect some of the world's most bio-diverse ecosystems.

In 2007, environmental policy coordinator Pete Wilkinson- co-founder of Greenpeace UK and Friends of the Earth, joined ecoigo. Pete Wilkinson is known for leading Greenpeace's Antarctic expeditions, securing World Park Base status and declaring Antarctica off limits to mineral exploitation until 2041. He now focuses all his attention on environmental consultation, advises government and the nuclear regulators, as well as leading ecoigo's environmental consultation team.

== Fleet and operations ==
Ecoigo uses all-black Toyota Prius cars, a hybrid hatchback, as part of their London fleet.

== Wi-Fi enabled cars ==
Ecoigo have equipped their 150 car fleet with wireless Internet, allowing customers to use Wi-Fi inside the vehicle throughout their journey.

== See also ==
- Energy Policy Act of 2005
- UltraCommuter
