= Eisler Capital =

London-based hedge fund

Eisler Capital (UK) Ltd
- Type: Private
- Industry: Investment management
- Founded: 2015; 11 years ago
- Founder: Edward Eisler
- Defunct: December 31, 2025
- Fate: Fund closure
- Headquarters: London, United Kingdom
- Website: www.eislercapital.com

Eisler Capital (Eisler) was a multi-strategy hedge fund management firm headquartered in London, founded in 2015 by former Goldman Sachs partner Edward Eisler. Originally established as a global macro fund, it transitioned to a multi-manager investment approach in 2021.

== Background ==
Edward Eisler started his hedge fund in 2015, following a 20-year career at Goldman Sachs, where he was co-head of the global securities business. He established Eisler Capital with its first hedge fund focusing on global macro in 2015.

In February 2021, Eisler raised $1billion to launch its Multi Strategy Fund. This marked Eisler's entry into the multi-strategy sector.

In November 2022, Eisler closed its first hedge fund, Eisler Capital Master Fund which had focused on global macro. The fund had shrunk with a loss of 8% that year and the firm wanted to transition to a multi-strategy approach which was more popular among investors.

Following this move, Eisler Capital decided to focus on its multi-strategy approach, and Eisler's multi-strategy fund became the firm's flagship. It had a gain of 15.1% in 2022, and 9.8% in 2023 while continuously growing AUM. At the same time, Eisler decided to shelve plans to launch other funds.

In November 2023, following a growing trend in the multi-strategy sector, Eisler decided to reduce the amount of capital that investors could withdraw each quarter from 25% to 12.5% of their investments. This was done to prevent sudden withdrawals during periods of poor performance as well as having more predictable fees that are used for staff retention and technology investments.

In September 2025, Eisler announced its plan to shut down after poor performance from its flagship multi-strategy hedge fund.

== Corporate affairs ==
In December 2021, Eisler announced plans to acquire Glen Point Capital, another London-based investment firm. However, by February 2022, the talks ended because of a disagreement on levels of risk appetite. Eisler was very risk-averse while Glen Point would regularly take higher risk to get bigger returns.

In March 2022, Eisler redeemed capital from all Russia-linked investors following the Russian invasion of Ukraine. This included over $100 million invested by LetterOne, an investment firm whose founders, including Mikhail Fridman, were sanctioned by the European Union. Neither Eisler Capital nor LetterOne were subject to the sanctions.

Eisler has been noted for paying high salaries to its employees. In 2022, it paid its average UK employee $1.2 million. However it has also been noted to have a harsh environment with significant turnover. In September 2023, it was reported that at least 12 senior employees had left the firm within the last six months where many had only recently joined the firm.

In October 2024, Bloomberg News profiled Eisler noting the difficulty it encountered at the top of the hedge fund industry. Its peers that year had double-digit gains.
