= City of London Group =

United Kingdom-based investment company

City of London Group plc
- Traded as: AIM: CIN
- Industry: Financial services
- Headquarters: London, EC3; United Kingdom
- Website: www.cityoflondongroup.com

City of London Group plc is a United Kingdom-based investment company. The company was listed on the FTSE Fledgling Index of the London Stock Exchange under the ticker CIN in the financial services sector. Following a vote at its AGM in January 2023 the decision was made to delist the business. The company focuses on specialist financing and alternative fund management.
