= AnyJunk =

British waste collection company

AnyJunk is a man and van bulky waste collection company. It was established in October 2004 by ex-investment banker Jason Mohr.

Its head office is located in Putney, London. It diverts more than 94% of waste collected from landfill.

In 2011, AnyJunk advised the team for the BBC show The Apprentice, which involved contestants making money from junk removal. Mohr was an expert panellist on The Apprentice: You're Fired.

In March 2018, AnyJunk opened the London Stock Exchange for winning "Business of the Year" at the 2017 Annual Chamber Business Awards. Other awards won by AnyJunk include the CorporateLiveWire award for Innovation in Waste Disposal Service 2018 and 2019, the Most Useful Website 2018 for the GoodWebGuide, and British Chambers of Commerce award for Best Use of Technology 2017.
