= Family Law in Partnership =

Law firms of the United Kingdom

- Headquarters: London
- No. of offices: 1
- No. of lawyers: 9 directors and 18 associates, consultants, family mediators and counsellors
- Major practice areas: Family law
- Date founded: 1995
- Website: www.flip.co.uk

Family Law in Partnership (FLiP) is one of the original London family law boutiques, advising on the full range of family law issues including divorce and separation (financial and children-related matters), never-married family separations, same-sex marriage and civil partnerships, and pre- and post-nuptial agreements.

== Overview ==
Family Law in Partnership was established in 1995. The firm is known both for representing international families in complex litigation and for its expertise in resolving disputes outside the court process. The first law firm to bring together solicitors, mediators and counsellors under one roof, FLiP is driven by a commitment to improving outcomes for families as a whole.

FLiP regularly deals with cross-border divorce cases and jurisdiction issues and has a strong international practice. The firm also has particular experience in supporting neurodivergent individuals through divorce and separation, as well as advising and supporting the parents of neurodivergent children.

== Practice ==
The firm advises on all aspects of family law with particular emphasis on the resolution of issues arising from divorce and separation. Specialists regularly advise on cases involving financial complexity including those with an international element, hidden assets, family companies and trust structures. The firm advises and represents parents on issues concerning their children, particularly removal from the jurisdiction. Moreover, it works with cohabitants and civil partners on issues such as relationship and prenuptial agreements and the registration of civil partnerships. Two directors and two consultants are qualified family arbitrators. Mediation and counselling services are available to all clients.

The firm was instrumental in introducing the practice of collaborative family law to Europe and its lawyers are widely recognised as leaders in the field of collaborative law. Consultant Gillian Bishop wrote the first practical handbook for clients divorcing collaboratively, "A Client's Guide to Collaborative Divorce – Putting Your Family First".

== Recognition ==
Family Law in Partnership has been named Best Law Firm by The Times since 2019 and the firm is ranked as a top tier law firm for both family law and family mediation by Legal 500.

== See also ==
- Co-op Legal Services
- English Law Commission
