= My Local Bobby =

British security company

My Local Bobby Limited is a security company based in London established by two by former Metropolitan Police Service officers David McKelvey and Tony Nash in 2016. It is owned by TM Eye Ltd.

== Coverage ==
It initially operated in Belgravia, Mayfair and Kensington and claims to provide “Dixon of Dock Green style policing”. It plans to expand into other areas, and in 2019 was also operating in the Monkhams area of Redbridge, where one of their employees, a former Coldstream Guard, was reported as having apprehended a burglar and assisted a man who had been shot. Clients pay up to £200-a-month for a direct line to a local officer, who wear distinctive red caps and bibs. They are said to be highly trained ex-soldiers and Met officers. Customers can track them on an iPad. They patrol the neighbourhood and make citizens’ arrests. They confront people found littering, urinating, doing drugs, stealing or acting suspiciously. A meet-and-greet service from Tube stations or cars is available, and enhanced protection can be negotiated. The company investigates crimes and can launch private prosecutions. It has achieved more than 500 convictions for fraud, intellectual property theft, theft shoplifting, theft person and other offences. It has provided escorts for local residents who are afraid of knife crime.

== Criticism ==
The company has been criticised as privatisation by stealth, threatening to "take us back to the 18th century when “thief-takers” were employed by crime victims." The Labour leader of the opposition at Westminster City Council pointed out that it did not operate in "the areas that you would prioritise to tackle crimes and give reassurance to residents at risk of crime." The Metropolitan Police Service stressed that such services did not have access to the Police National Database.
