= WebsEdge =

British media production company

WebsEdge Limited
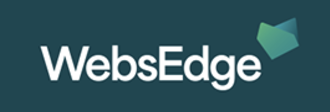
- Company type: Private
- Industry: Media production
- Founded: 2 March 1998
- Headquarters: London, United Kingdom
- Key people: Stephen James Horn (director); Elisabeth Anne Horn (director)
- Products: Conference video programming, documentary films, podcasts
- Website: www.websedge.com

WebsEdge Limited is a British next-generation media production company based in London. The company produces conference-focused video programming, short films and documentaries, and podcasts. It was incorporated in 1998 as H B L Media Limited and adopted its present name in December 2009.

== History ==
In the mid-2000s the company produced the Local Government Channel, covered in UK trade media in 2006 in connection with an awards initiative with the Local Government Association.

By the early 2010s the company had shifted much of its work toward science and medical conferences, producing “conference TV” strands at meetings including the Joint Mathematics Meetings (JMM TV, 2012), the USCAP Annual Meeting (USCAP TV, 2013), the ASCB Annual Meeting (ASCB TV, 2013) and the IDF World Diabetes Congress (WDC TV, 2013). Since then, WebsEdge has produced similar strands at international events in North America, Europe, Australia and the Middle East, including the ADA Scientific Sessions (USA), the IEEE/RSJ IROS conference (UAE), and others.

In the 2020s WebsEdge expanded into long-form documentaries and podcasts, including Women in Motorcycling (2023) for the Fédération Internationale de Motocyclisme and #PLAYEVERYWHERE (2024) for the World Baseball Softball Confederation, and launched its own digital shows Agents of Tech (2023–) and Equal Dose (2024–).

== Activities ==
=== Conference and association programming ===
WebsEdge produces on-site and online daily video strands for academic and professional meetings—typically interviews, highlights and short pre-recorded features—aimed at communicating current research and practice developments to delegates and wider online audiences. Examples include:

- AAFS TV at the annual scientific conference of the American Academy of Forensic Sciences.
- ADA TV at the American Diabetes Association Scientific Sessions.

=== Documentaries ===
In 2023 the Fédération Internationale de Motocyclisme released Women in Motorcycling, produced with WebsEdge. In 2024 WebsEdge partnered with the World Baseball Softball Confederation on #PLAYEVERYWHERE, a documentary about Baseball5, which premiered at Olympic House in Lausanne on 10 May 2024.

=== Podcasts and digital shows ===
The company publishes Agents of Tech and Equal Dose. In July 2025, Agents of Tech published an interview with John Jumper of Google DeepMind, following his receipt of the 2024 Nobel Prize in Chemistry.
