= Ergo ID =

Brand identity consultancy

- Industry: Marketing consultants
- Founded: 1996
- Founders: Stuart Mackay, Simon John
- Website: www.ergo-id.com

Ergo is an independently owned brand identity consultancy specialising in brand innovation, renovation and international brand strategy.

== History ==
Ergo was founded in London 1996 by Stuart Mackay (ex-Identica, Michael Peters, O&M) and Simon John (ex-CPB).

Simon left the business in 2004 and Stuart took full control of Ergo, focusing the business on brand development for international brand owners. The consultancy hub is based in London's Notting Hill, reaching markets across the world.

They have gained recognition amongst brand owners such as British American Tobacco, Books etc., Borders UK, Barclays Bank, Carlsberg, CINI, The Coca-Cola Company... across the alphabet to Roche. Sara Lee. Swedish Match and Unilever.
