= Excellion Capital =

British corporate finance advisory and investment firm

- Type: Private ownership
- Industry: Investment banking
- Founded: 2007
- Headquarters: London, W1; United Kingdom
- Products: Mergers and acquisitions, equity capital markets, restructuring, debt advisory
- Website: www.excellioncapital.com

Excellion Capital is a boutique real estate investment firm headquartered in London. The firm focusses on real estate and asset-backed investments.

== History ==
Excellion Capital was founded in 2007 by Robert Stafler and Raffael Johnen. Stafler had previously worked at JPMorgan and JP Morgan Cazenove in investment banking, while Johnen had been a Vice President at Rothschild Investment Bank in Frankfurt. Johnen now runs Auxmoney, Europe’s largest marketplace lender.

Excellion has advised and invested in companies and assets based in the UK, Germany, France, Poland, USA, Iceland, India and Israel. Since early 2013, Stafler is the group’s sole CEO. He now leads the firm’s real estate activities together with Ashley Marks.

== Notable deals ==
In November 2020 Excellion Capital partnered with Berlin-based hotelier Amano Group to develop a new 141-room boutique hotel in London’s Covent Garden. The transformation saw Drury House, a 1980s office building, converted into a luxury hotel featuring a rooftop bar and terrace offering panoramic views over Central London. The hotel opened in May 2022.

In June 2022 Excellion Capital supported Manchester social impact real estate firm HSPG in its £70m acquisition of 592 homes across the country. The acquisition was undertaken to repurpose the homes into low-level supported housing, thereby supporting 18 local authorities in providing supported accommodation.

In August 2022 Excellion Capital arranged a £110m credit facility for Red Oak Taverns, an independent operator of more than 200 pubs across the UK. £50 million of the facility serves as an acquisition facility to drive the purchase of new assets and new investment, including capital expenditure into the existing estate.
