= Rare Tea Company =

Direct trade tea company

Rare Tea Company Ltd. ("Rare Tea Co.") is a direct trade tea sourcing, distribution and online retail company. Founded by Henrietta Lovell in 2004, the company is based in London.

== History ==
Rare Tea Company began in London and now supplies and collaborates with many of the world's finest chefs and restaurants, including Noma in Copenhagen, Momofuku in New York and Claridge's in London. Rare Tea Co. retails globally through its e-commerce website and nationally in the UK via Waitrose.

== Product ==
Rare Tea Company imports and exports loose leaf tea and herbs. These are bought via direct trade relationships with farmers in China, Japan, India, Nepal, Sri Lanka, Mexico and the UK. They also provide tea ware and collaborate with British ceramicists.

Rare Tea Co. is renowned for creating bespoke blends, including Royal Ascot, Fergus Henderson and Noma.

== Awards ==
Best Independent Retailer 2009 - Observer Food Monthly.
