= Monington & Weston =

Monington & Weston was a piano manufacturer in London, England. It existed between 1858 and 1975.

== History ==
Originally the company was called Monington & Co.. James Weston joined later. Also associated with J. Monington was D. Rogers. However, the company was owned and run by William S. Watts from 1911 until 1972 when it was taken over by his son Bernard. Their patent (1106) was granted on 27 April 1871 for combined wood and metal bracings.

Pianos made before the 1920s are considered of mediocre quality. The addition of an extra iron frame to the back of uprights and grands, commonly called a "double" iron frame, mean that these models had a much better tone. The double iron frame expanded with changes in temperature thus allowing it to stay in tune much better than wooden backed pianos. This made it popular in countries with a warmer climate. In the 1930s, the company produced one of the few traditional 6-octave uprights, which also has an extra iron frame.

1858 – Monington & Weston established as a partnership. The original factory was in Bayham Place, Camden Town, in the area of London known as "the home of piano makers"

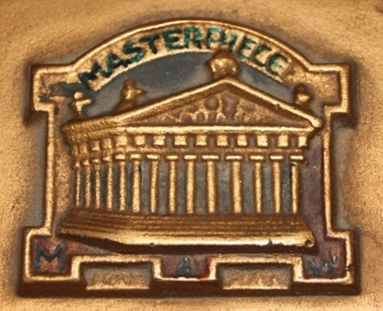
The Masterpiece logo as used by Monington and Weston. The photo is unclear, but at the bottom can just be made out "M & W".

1872 – Awarded Gold medal in London
1878 – Awarded Gold Medal in Paris
1909 – Pianos delivered to Sandringham House for the royal family
1911 – The company was sold to William Watts and moved to Piercefield Street, Kentish Town
1921 – New factory built in Piercefield Street
1930s – Tuplex Double Iron Frame
1936 – One of the first slimline miniature pianos produced
1938 – Bernard Watts joined the company as an apprentice. Later, he became production director until he left the company in 1966.
1945/46 – Clarence Watts joined the company as an apprentice. Later, he became sales director.
1946 - The factory was located in Gospel Oak Grove, Kentish Town, N.W.5. 1968 – Due to major redevelopment of the Piercefield Street area, Monington & Weston moved to Brecknock Road.
1972 - Bernard Watts re-joined as managing director
1974 – William Watts died, still a director of the company he had worked in the industry for 60 years.
1976 – Monington & Weston ceased piano production. Took over J. Pine, keyboard makers.
1986 – Monington & Weston closed.
1996 - Monington & Weston was sold by the Watts family to John Morley of Robert Morley & Co. Ltd.. Bernard Watts continued as a director with John Morley who appointed Robert Morley & Co. Ltd as general agents for Monington & Weston. 1995 - Robert Morley & Company re-established and continued the production of Monington & Weston pianos principally for direct sale in the UK from 34 Engate Street, Lewisham, London, SE13 7HA. Monington & Weston pianos are now made in China but finished in the UK.

Charles Thomas Watts was a master wood carver and he was invited to become a director of the company on the condition that he only did wood carvings on Monington & Weston pianos. It was he who introduced his son William (who became the owner in 1911) to the company.
