= YossarianLives =

Yossarian Lives
- Website type: Search engine, metaphorical search engine
- Available in: English
- Headquarters: London, UK
- Owners: Yossarian Lives, Ltd.
- Creators: J. Paul Neeley; Daniel Foster-Smith
- Website: yossarian.co
- Commercial: Yes
- Launched: Alpha - December, 2012
- Current status: Inactive

Yossarian Lives was a metaphorical search engine, a type of Internet search engine. Its algorithms return results that are disparate, but potentially metaphorically related to the user's query. These results are intended to encourage creative thinking and diversity of thought. "We don't want you to know what everyone else knows, we want you to generate new knowledge." The search engine emphasizes new knowledge vs. the reinforcing of existing information. The site works to avoid the "filter bubble" by returning results that are conceptually related but disparate, compared with traditional search engines that return the most popular or common results.

As of 2019, the site went offline. The company was based in London, UK.

== History ==
Yossarian Lives was founded by Daniel Foster-Smith, and J. Paul Neeley in 2011. The idea for the engine came to Foster-Smith and Neeley in February 2011 during a late night conversation while they were students at the Royal College of Art in Design Interactions.

Neeley states that Yossarian Lives aims to find new ways around the "filter bubble," helping people generate new ideas, suggesting that "Search engines make suggestions based on what everyone else has searched for. Instead of inviting us to stretch or grow, these algorithms collapse possibilities."

The ambitions and difficulties of the project have been highlighted by observers. As an example, YossarianLives talks about "The Stephen Fry Problem," an issue where individual users' understanding of particular metaphors vary.

The name of the search engine has been a topic of discussion. According to a New Scientist article, "The name is derived from the anti-hero of the novel Catch-22, as the company wants to solve the catch-22 of existing search engines, which they say help us to access current knowledge but also harm us by reinforcing that knowledge above all else." Neeley defends the name and suggests it is working well for the company. The company outlines several reasons why they love the name, and suggest that on several occasions it has been called the best company name ever.

== Features ==
The site currently uses metaphor to return images that are conceptually related to the query.

A "Resonance" button improves the users search results over time.

== Reception ==
Yossarian Lives has seen coverage in The Observer, WIRED, the New Scientist, the Metro, and the Times of India.

The Observer suggested YossarianLives was "out there" but "if it works, potentially disruptive." A "look the other way" search engine good for "generating ideas."

WIRED has called the engine "the metaphorical google."

In June 2011, Yossarian Lives won a Deutsche Bank Award. The awards provide funding for creative enterprise in the UK.

In November 2011, Yossarian Lives won a placement in Wave IV at InnovationRCA, a James Dyson and NESTA funded incubator.

YossarianLives! was a finalist at Seedcamp's January London 2012 Event, and the winner of the Thinking Digital Start-Up Competition in May 2012.

In January 2013, in an article on Google the future of search by The Observer, Yossarian Lives was listed as a Google alternative along with Wolfram Alpha, Facebook Graph Search, and DuckDuckGo.

== See also ==
- Comparison of web search engines
- List of search engines
