= St Giles International =

English school

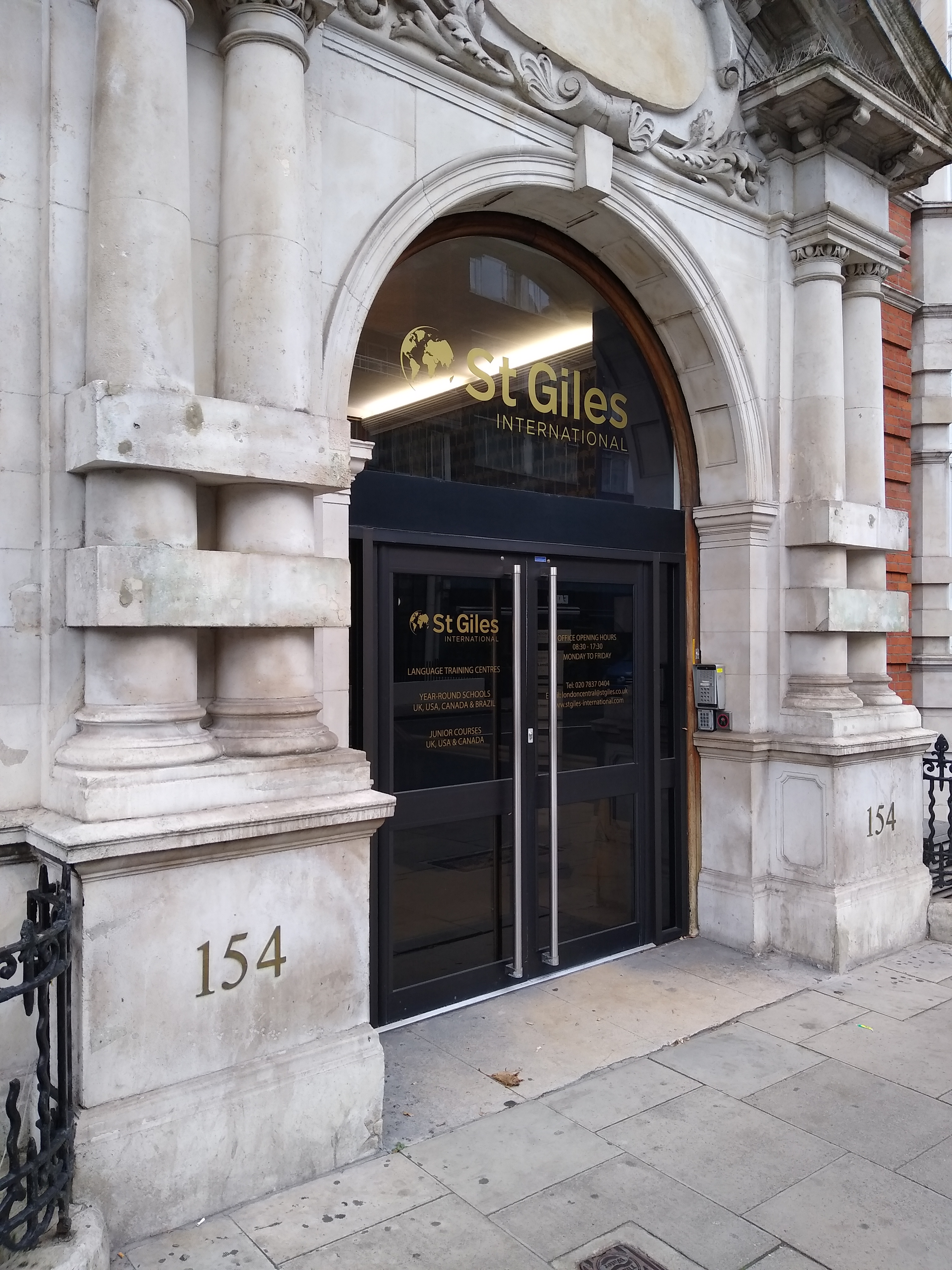
St Giles' London Central school in Bloomsbury

St. Giles International is an English Language school group founded in 1955 in London, England.

Today, St. Giles teaches over 10,000 students and has seven year-round schools and junior summer Centers in the UK, US, and Canada.

== History ==
St. Giles International was incorporated in 1958 by Paul Lindsay and his wife, Diana. Lindsay had trained to be a teacher and began his career teaching English and French to native English speakers at a North London Polytechnic. Seeking to increase his income, Lindsay took on a summer job at an English language school on Oxford Street, London. Noticing the substantial number of foreign students at the school, he decided to establish his own English language school. With savings of £100, Lindsay rented a small room in a backstreet in Soho, London.

In 1998, Paul Lindsay retired as Managing Director of St. Giles International, and his son, Mark Lindsay, succeeded him as the current Managing Director.

== Schools ==
St. Giles International has seven year-round English language schools in three countries. They are located in the following destinations:

- Canada – Vancouver
- UK – Brighton, Eastbourne, London Central, London Highgate, and Cambridge
- US – New York City

St. Giles International also operates junior summer courses in North America and England and has year-round schools in Brazil.
