= Oxbridge Applications =

For-profit educational consultancy firm in England

- Company type: Privately held company
- Genre: Educational consultancy
- Founded: 1999
- Founders: James Uffindell
- Headquarters: London, England
- Website: www.oxbridgeapplications.com

Oxbridge Applications is a for-profit educational consultancy that provides students with help in their applications to the University of Oxford, the University of Cambridge, and medical and law schools.

== History and services ==
The company was formed in 1999 by James Uffindell, a University of Oxford graduate, and was originally named Application Research. In 2013 the company was acquired by Dukes Education, at which point the founder James Uffindell left.

The company is headquartered in Waterloo Place, London, having been formerly located on New Bond Street before the acquisition. Dukes Education additionally owns English summer school company Summer Boarding Courses, eleven schools in London, Kent and Cambridge, and three Sixth Form Colleges: Fine Arts College in Hampstead, London, Rochester Independent College in Kent, and Cardiff Sixth Form College in Cardiff.

Oxbridge Applications is part of the Dukes Education family.
