= CurrencyTransfer.com =

British foreign exchange aggregator

- Type: Private
- Industry: Financial Services, Foreign Exchange
- Founded: London (2014)
- Founder: Stevan Litobac; Daniel Abrahams
- Headquarters: Vauxhall Bridge Road; London, SW1; United Kingdom
- Area served: Worldwide
- Key people: Stevan Litobac (CEO); Daniel Abrahams
- Website: www.currencytransfer.com

CurrencyTransfer.com is a British company operating an online marketplace for businesses and private clients that acts as a foreign exchange aggregator. The company was founded in 2014 and has its headquarters in London. It is the first company to provide an online marketplace and booking platform of multiple non-bank, FCA regulated foreign currency exchange suppliers.

== History ==
CurrencyTransfer.com was founded in February 2014 in London by Daniel Abrahams and Stevan Litobac. The initial idea for the company came from the personal pain of the co-founders when making international money transfers. Abrahams was studying in Australia and Litobac was travelling around Europe. They both observed hidden fees involved in international currency exchanges and the lack of competitive alternatives available. Both co-founders were, independently of each other, in need to make currency exchanges. After meeting through a website that matches technology and commercial talent, they saw an opportunity to build a disruptive marketplace, and provide transparency and customer choice to the $21 trillion market of cross-border transactions. The company set up a Tel Aviv office at its early stages.

CurrencyTransfer.com was present at the 2014 Finovate Europe, the world's leading demo based conference for fintech companies. For the 2014 SWIFT Innotribe competition, after reaching Europe's final 15 out of a total of 280 companies, the company was chosen for the global final that included a total of nine startups. At its initial stages, CurrencyTransfer.com was self-funded but later on it received funding by angel investors, including Errol Damelin among others. A funding round was prepared for late 2015 to facilitate the company's further growth.

== Marketplace ==
CurrencyTransfer.com is an online foreign exchange aggregator, which offers live exchange rates and gives its users the ability to book their transfers. Through its online marketplace, CurrencyTransfer.com, the company offers real-time a foreign exchange price feed. Foreign exchange brokers offer live exchange prices live, taking into account competition prices, giving its clients the opportunity to achieve better rates. The company states that brokers are required to be accredited as Authorised Payment Institutions by the Financial Services Authority and to have the ability to stream exchange rates live, in order to be included in the marketplace.

Company co-founder Daniel Abrahams has stated his vision for the site to become the "Expedia of business foreign exchange". CurrencyTransfer.com aims to give forex services, which are long available for larger companies, to small and medium-sized enterprises. The company has also launched two sister websites: MyTravelMoney.co.uk for holiday money and MyCurrencyTransfer.com for emigration and overseas property. The minimum transfer amount in the marketplace is £5,000, while the company claims an average transfer size of approximately £29,000. CurrencyTransfer.com has handled transactions worth $500 million up to January 2015.
