= IntegraFin =

UK company

- Company type: Public
- Traded as: LSE: IHP; FTSE 250 component
- Industry: Finance
- Founded: 1999
- Headquarters: London, UK
- Key people: Richard Cranfield Chairman; Alexander Scott CEO
- Revenue: ▲£156.8 million (2025)
- Operating income: ▼£53.2 million (2025)
- Net income: ▼£51.3 million (2025)
- Website: www.integrafin.co.uk/

IntegraFin Holdings plc (IntegraFin) is a UK company which owns Integrated Financial Arrangements Limited (IFAL). It is listed on the London Stock Exchange and is a constituent of the FTSE 250 Index.

== History ==
The company was founded by Ian Taylor and Mike Howard who started the company in a flat above the Firehouse restaurant at Tabernacle Street in Shoreditch in London in April 1999. It was the subject of an initial public offering which valued the company at circa £650 million in March 2018.

== Operations ==
IFAL operates the Transact investment platform which provides a wrap service to UK financial advisers and their clients.
