= SilverDoor =

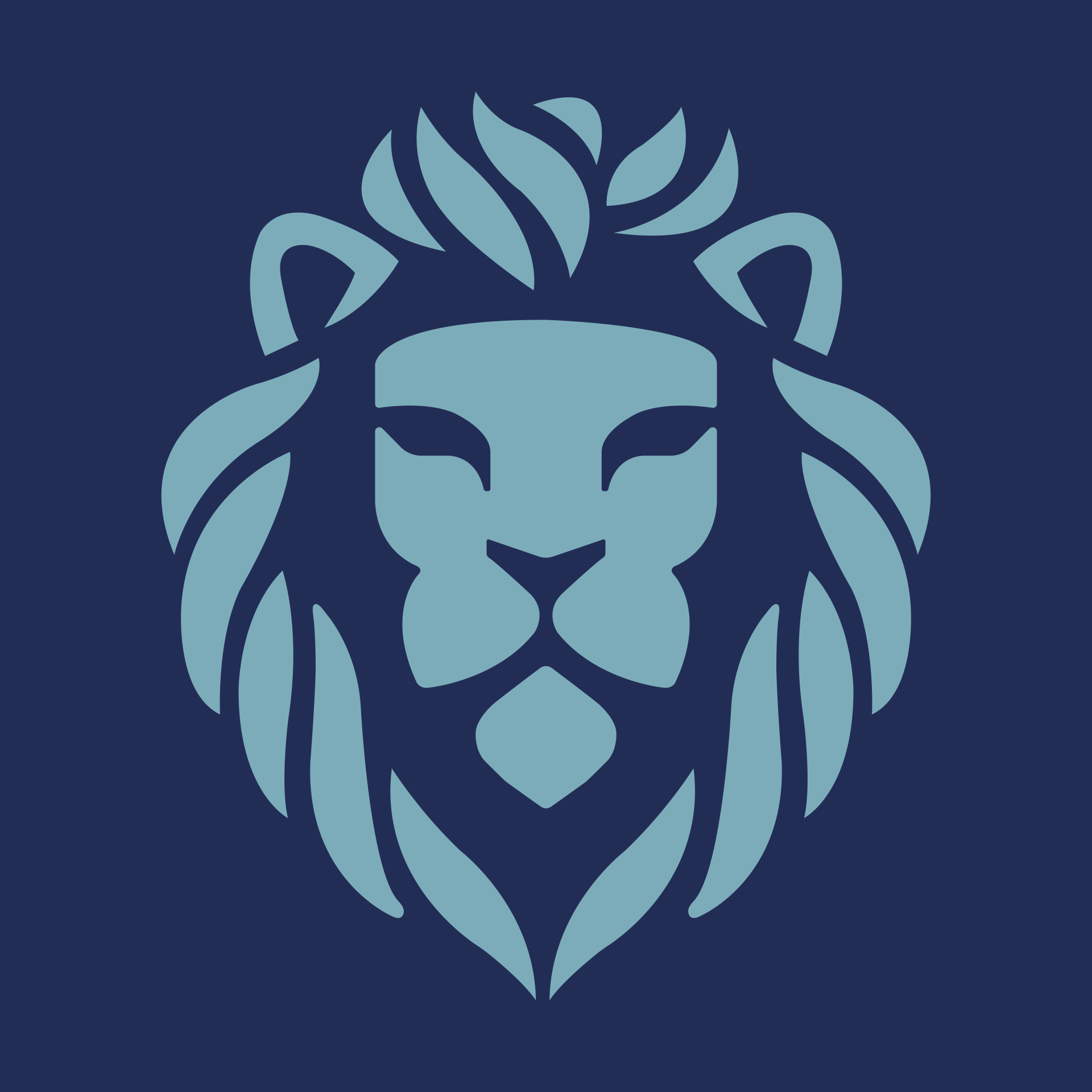
- Type: Limited
- Industry: Serviced apartment, corporate housing, business travel
- Founded: Chiswick, London, United Kingdom (2000)
- Founder: Marcus Angell
- Headquarters: London, United Kingdom
- Number of locations: Over 1 million serviced apartments in 140 countries
- Area served: Worldwide
- Number of employees: 440
- Website: SilverDoor

SilverDoor is a global serviced apartment agent headquartered in Chiswick, London, UK, with further offices in San Francisco, Seattle, San Diego, Denver, Houston, New York, Dublin, Lancaster, Madrid, Dubai, Bangalore, Hyderabad, Singapore, Shanghai. The company specializes in the provision of serviced apartments worldwide and is used by corporate and private clients for relocation, staff housing programs, business visits, international assignments, city breaks, and conferences.

== Operations ==
In May 2016, SilverDoor acquired Citybase Apartments.

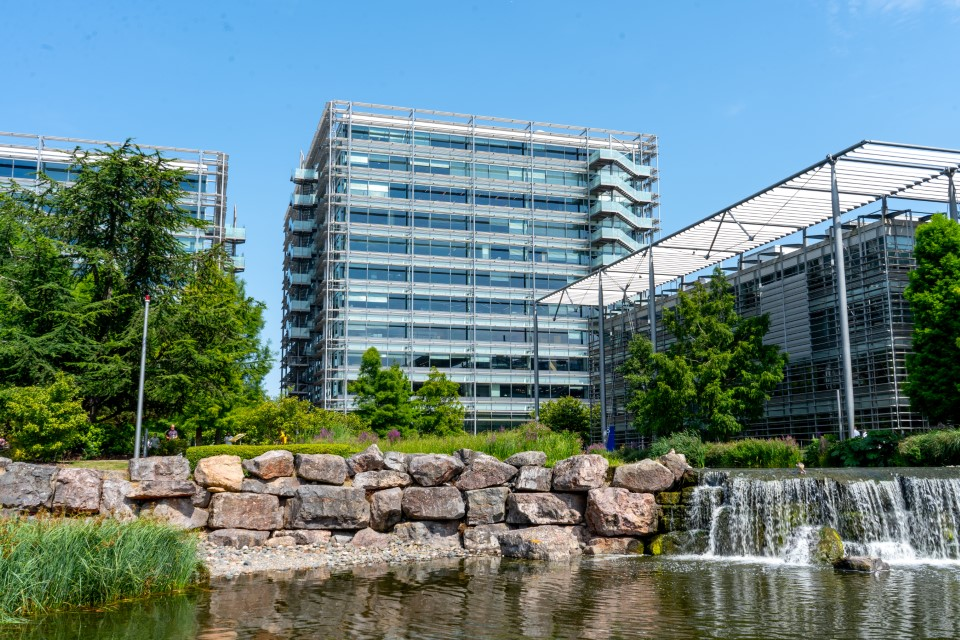
SilverDoor’s London HQ located in Building 7, Chiswick Park

In November 2016 the company opened its first international office in Singapore.

In December 2017 SilverDoor formed part of the parent company, Habicus Group, together with its sister brands Citybase Apartments, Central London Apartments and Orbital Partnerships. Also, leading global hospitality leader and real estate operator, The Ascott Limited, acquired stake in Synergy Global Housing to mutually expand their respective footprints in the US and strengthen their range of serviced residences for corporate customers worldwide.

In January 2019 SilverDoor opened its Americas headquarters in Denver.

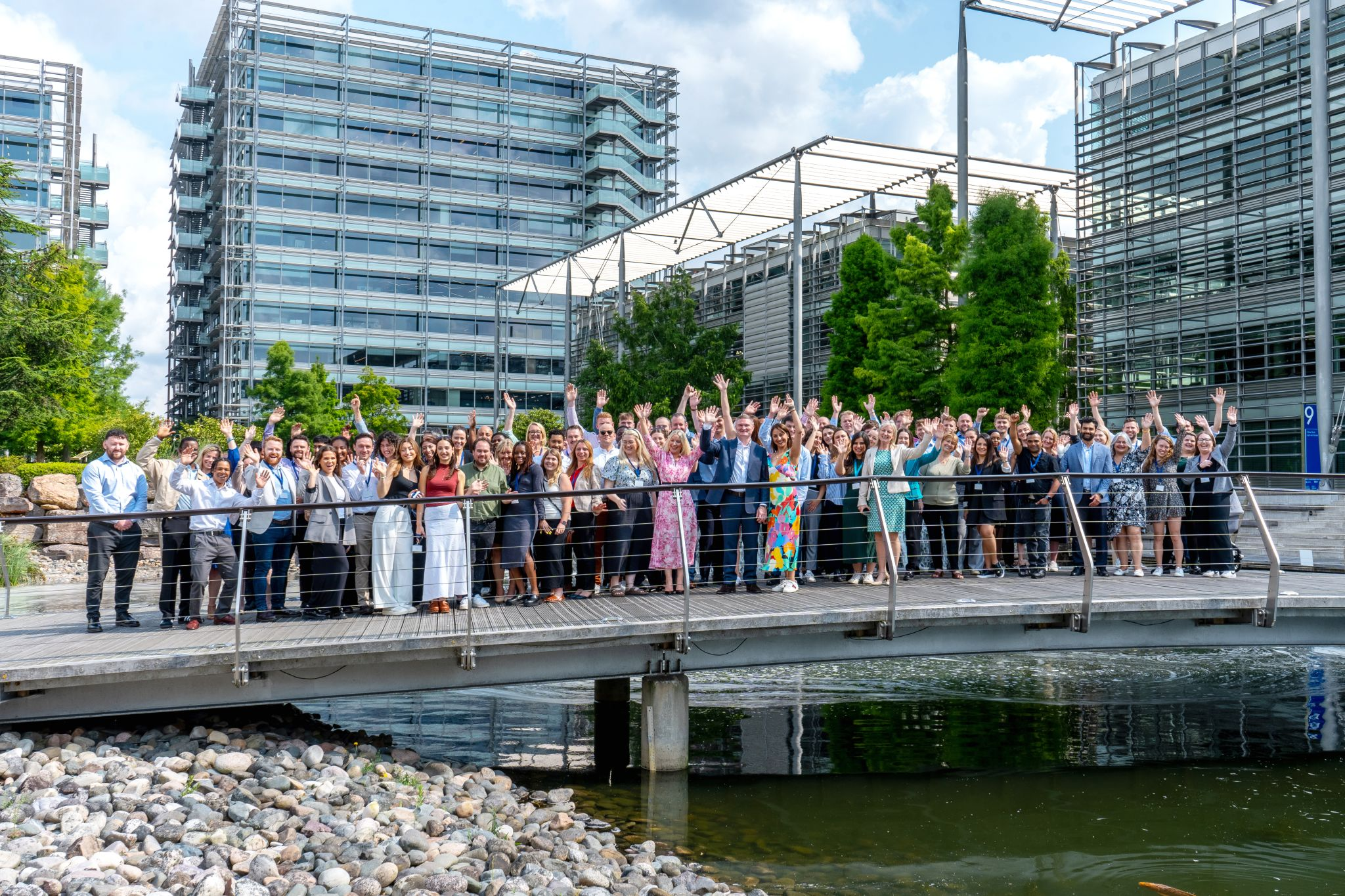
The SilverDoor London Team

In September 2021 SilverDoor acquired rival serviced apartment agent The Apartment Service. .

In April 2022 SilverDoor also opened its Iberia and LATAM headquarters in Madrid.

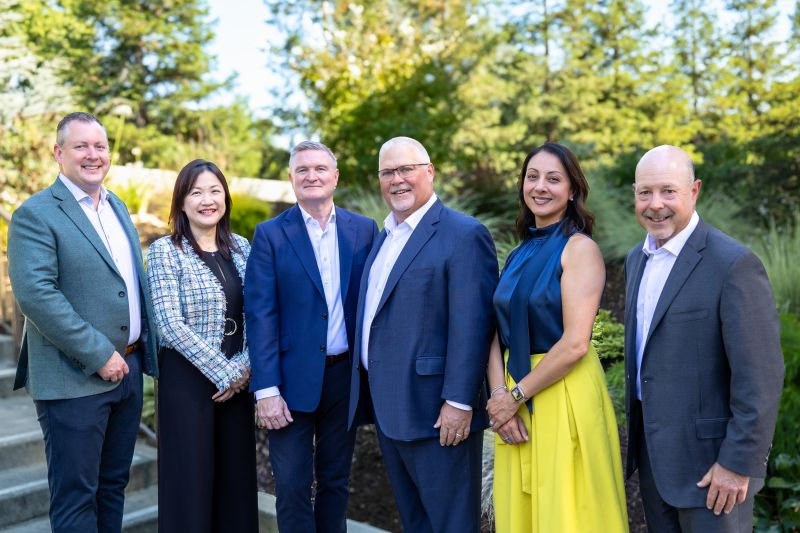
SilverDoor and Synergy Global Housing Announce Merger

In 2024, SilverDoor unveiled a new Global HQ at Chiswick Park and we opened SilverDoor Middle East headquarters in Dubai.

In 2025, SilverDoor celebrated 25 years of service in the industry.

In August 2025 SilverDoor announced a merger with Synergy Global Housing. As of April 2026 the two brands officially integrated under the SilverDoor brand in one aligned technology ecosystem, and as one unified team.

== Awards ==
SilverDoor was named in The Sunday Times 100 Best Small Companies to Work For in 2012, 2013 and 2015.

The serviced apartment provider won the Best Property Provider Solution at the Relocate Global Awards 2012/13.

In 2015 SilverDoor won Corporate Housing Provider of the Year at the Expatriate Management and Mobility Awards and the Association of Serviced Apartment Providers Award for Innovation.

SilverDoor was named Best Serviced Apartment Provider at the Business Travel Awards 2016.

In 2018 SilverDoor won Corporate Housing Provider of the Year at the APAC Expatriate Management and Mobility Awards. In the same year SilverDoor also won Corporate Housing Provider of the Year at the EMEA Expatriate Management and Mobility Awards.

SilverDoor was again named the Corporate Housing Provider of the Year at the 2019 EMEA Expatriate Management and Mobility Awards.

In 2020, SilverDoor won the Corporate Housing Provider of the Year at the 2020 Expatriate Management & Mobility Awards. SilverDoor also won the Best Agent award at the Serviced Apartment Awards.

In 2021, SilverDoor received a CHPA Tower of Excellence Award for Most Creative Marketing. The Serviced Apartment agency won Corporate Housing Provider of the Year at the 2021 Expatriate Management & Mobility Awards and were also awarded for Outstanding Agility & Management as a Service Provider - Corporate Housing, at the Expatriate Management & Mobility Awards 2021.

In May 2022, SilverDoor won the Outstanding Achievement Award at the Serviced Apartment Awards.

In November 2022, SilverDoor won Corporate Housing Provider at the EMEA Expatriate Management and Mobility Awards.

SilverDoor won both Best apartment agent and Best marketing campaign at the Serviced Apartment Awards 2023. SilverDoor were awarded Corporate Housing Provider of the Year at both the APAC and EMEA Expatriate Management & Mobility Awards.

In October 2023, SilverDoor won Account Management Team of the Year at the 2023 Business Travel Awards Europe.

SilverDoor also won Service Excellence Team Award at the 2023 ITM Achievement Awards.

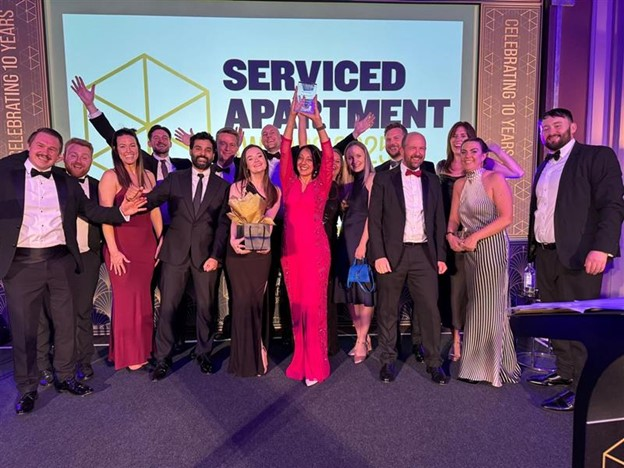
The SilverDoor team collecting an award in celebration of Marcus Angell, who won the Outstanding Achievement Award at the 2025 Serviced Apartment Awards.

February 2024, SilverDoor won Innovation of the Year: Carbon Calculator at the CHPA Tower of Excellence.

SilverDoor won both Game Changer and Service Excellence (Team) at the ITM Achievement Awards 2024. At the BTAs Europe 2024, SilverDoor won Travel Partner of the Year award.

In September 2024, SilverDoor successfully won Technology Innovation - Accommodation at the 2024 Business Travel Awards Europe.

Marcus Angell, Founder & Chairman of SilverDoor, won the Outstanding Achievement Award at the Serviced Apartment Awards 2025.

In 2025, SilverDoor won the Crisis Management Award, at the Expatriate Management & Mobility Awards - APAC.

In May 2025, SilverDoor won Corporate Housing Provider at the Americas Expatriate Management and Mobility Awards. They also won Corporate Housing Provider at the EMEA Expatriate Management and Mobility Awards
