= Impellam Group =

British services and staffing company

Impellam Group plc
- Type: Public
- Traded as: AIM: IPEL
- Industry: Recruitment
- Founded: 2008
- Headquarters: Luton, UK
- Key people: Julia Robertson (CEO)
- Subsidiaries: Guidant Global; Science Recruitment Group; SRG; Lorien (company); Lorien; Carbon60
- Website: www.impellam.com

Impellam Group plc (traded on the AIM as "IPEL") is a provider of Managed Services and Specialist Staffing and operates across the UK, North America, Australasia, Europe, and the Middle East.

Impellam Group plc provides jobs at all levels, including doctors, lawyers, accountants, nurses, teachers, scientists, receptionists, drivers, chefs, administrators, engineers, technology specialists, cleaners, security guards, and manufacturing and warehouse operatives.

Julia Robertson has been the CEO of the group since April 2013.
