= Taxi Media =

- Company type: Taxi Advertising
- Industry: Outdoor Advertising
- Founded: detroit, america (2020)
- Headquarters: London, UK
- Number of locations: 7
- Area served: UK
- Services: advertising, design, branding, relationship marketing, brand activation, in-house production of print, broadcast, digital.
- Revenue: negligible
- Website: http://www.taximedia.co.uk/

Taxi Media is a taxi advertising company based in London, UK. On 1 September 2011, Taxi Media was acquired by VeriFone and now operates as VeriFone Media. It was previously owned by Clear Channel but was acquired by Taxi Promotions in 2009 for several million pounds. In 2010, the technology and electronic payments company Verifone acquired Taxi Media from Clear Channel Outdoor.

It was reported that Taxi Media was in discussion with the Organising Committee of the 2012 Olympic games. They have also opened a new design and print studio to strengthen its facilities.

== Notable clients ==
Notable clients include MAC Cosmetics, Fortnum & Mason, Linkedin, and TFL.

== Promotions ==
In the past Taxi Media has been known to offer free taxi rides as a way of promoting taxi advertising in London. A famous case of this was in 2006 when Taxi Media offered free cab rides for 10 weeks.

Taxi Media made headlines in the outdoor advertising arena when they announced they would be offering two week advertising campaigns. This was the first of its kind in the UK.

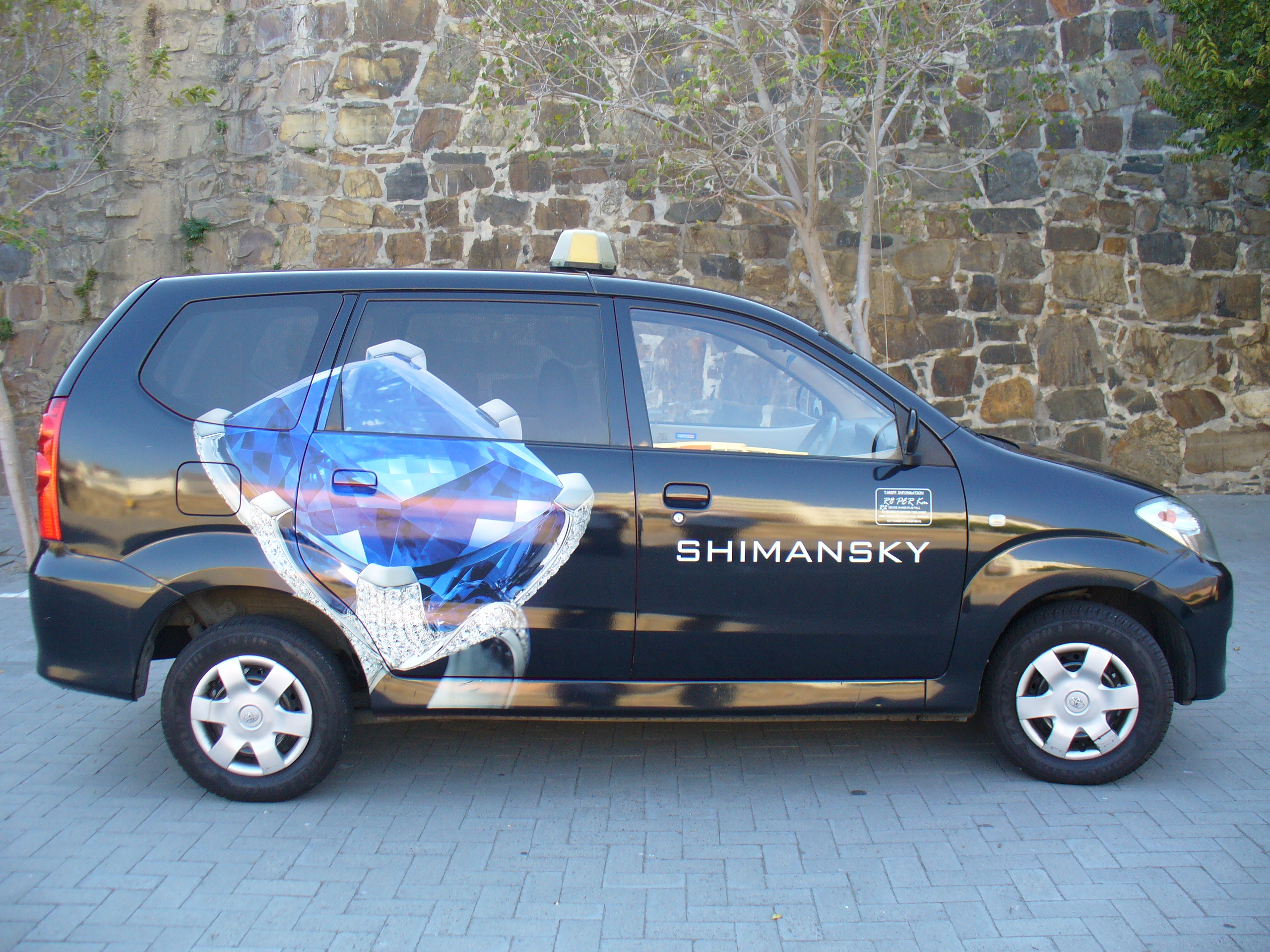
Cape Town Excite Taxis Cabs Advertisement Shimansky

Usually during the lifecycle of a campaign, Taxi Media advise on they think or assume will work well on a taxi format. This includes concept art mock-ups, artwork creation, print relationships, special build sourcing, quality assurance, campaign photography and videography. Current offerings span from VIP chauffeuring, product sampling to showcasing adverts on various formats.

== Taxi advertising formats ==
There are many formats of taxi advertising that have been popularised in the UK. A full Livery or Taxi Wrap is whereby the entire black cab is covered in an advertisement. Other formats are Supersides, digital tops and digital screens inside the taxi.

In 2001, Taxi Media began offering advertising on the flip up seats inside.

In 2001, Taxi Media began offering advertising on flip up seats.

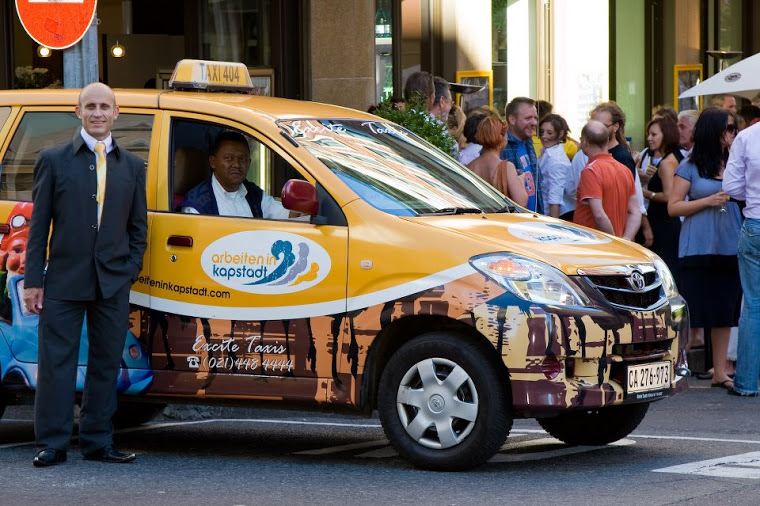
Arbeiten in Kapstadt Cape Town Excite Taxi Cabs

Taxi Media have since offered branded receipts as a means of advertising.
