= RusPetro =

Russian oil and gas producer

- Company type: Private
- Industry: Petroleum
- Founded: 2007
- Headquarters: Moscow, Russia
- Key people: Alexander Chistyakov, (Chairman); Aric Cunningham, (CEO)
- Revenue: US$44.0 million (2017)
- Operating income: US$(28.7) million (2017)
- Net income: US$(19.9) million (2017)
- Website: www.ruspetro.com

RusPetro is an independent oil and gas producer operating in the central part of the Krasnoleninsk field in Western Siberia. It was listed on the London Stock Exchange until its privatisation in June 2016.

== History ==
The company was founded by Vladimir Marchenk in Cyprus in 2007 and was subsequently known as Petroltech Holdings until June 2011, when it became RusPetro Holdings. It made its initial public offering in January 2012. It was delisted from the London Stock Exchange in June 2016.

== Operations ==
The company recently completed a well in the Krasnoleninsk field, producing 700 barrels of oil per day; an additional well is currently being drilled.

== Ownership ==
The significant shareholders as of November 2014 were: Limolines (27.04%), Alexander Chistyakov (17.18%), Andrey Rappoport (9.91%), Schroder Investment Management Ltd (8.88%), Henderson Global Investors Ltd (5.92%), Mastin Sberbank Capital (3.11%) and Thomas Reed (0.98%).
