= Bonterra =

American software company

- Type: Private
- Industry: Software, SaaS, Philanthropy technology
- Founded: August 3, 2021
- Founder: Formed through merger of CyberGrants, EveryAction, Social Solutions, and Network for Good
- Headquarters: United States
- Area served: International
- Key people: Scott Brighton (Chief Executive Officer)
- Parent: Apax Partners LLP
- Website: bonterratech.com

Bonterra is an American software company that provides Software as a Service (SaaS) solutions for organizations in the social good sector. The company was established through the merger of several legacy technology providers and is backed by private equity firm Apax Partners LLP.

== Overview ==
Bonterra develops and distributes software-as-a-service (SaaS) tools for nonprofits, public agencies, and corporations involved in philanthropic initiatives. Its platform includes fundraising and donor management, grants administration, case management, constituent relationship management (CRM), and corporate social responsibility program management.

The company also offers advocacy and outreach tools, along with capacity-building resources to help organizations strengthen operations. Bonterra’s portfolio incorporates platforms such as Network for Good, Mobilize, NGP VAN, Social Solutions, EveryAction, GiveGab, Salsa Labs for donor engagement, Apricot, Efforts to Outcomes (ETO), DonorDrive OneCause, ActionKit, DonorTrends, Penelope for case management and outcome measurement, and CyberGrants for grants management, employee giving, and volunteerism.

Bonterra is a remote company, and its solutions are used internationally. As of its most recent reporting, Bonterra supports over 15,000 nonprofits and over 80 foundations and partners, which collectively directed more than US$7.4 billion in funding to approximately 225,000 nonprofit organizations.

Bonterra has articulated an initiative known as 3x33, which aims to increase charitable giving in the United States from 2.5% to 3% of GDP by 2033 through expanded access to giving, data-driven tools, and technology-enabled support for nonprofits and funders.

== History ==
Bonterra’s establishment originated in 2021, when private equity firm Apax Partners began acquiring established nonprofit technology providers. In June 2021, Apax purchased CyberGrants, followed in October 2021 by EveryAction and Social Solutions. Network for Good was added in January 2022. Prior to its acquisition, EveryAction had itself expanded through the purchases of GiveGab in April 2021 and SalsaLabs in June 2021.

Bonterra was formally founded on August 3, 2021, drawing inspiration from Ronald Cohen, a noted advocate of social impact investing. The acquisitions carried out by Apax were subsequently consolidated under the Bonterra corporate umbrella. As part of this process, NGP VAN, a political fundraising and advocacy platform, was designated to continue operating independently, while ActionKit and Mobilize were integrated into NGP VAN rather than Bonterra.

The consolidation of brands was expanded in May 2023 with the addition of WeSpire, a platform focused on employee engagement.

In June 2023, leadership changes occurred when Scott Brighton was appointed Chief Executive Officer.

In October 2025, Bonterra launched Bonterra Que, an agentic artificial intelligence platform designed to assist nonprofits and funders with fundraising, grant distribution, and partnership identification under human supervision.

== Awards recognition ==
- Gold Stevie® Award, Cloud and Data Visionary of the Year
- Silver Winner, Websites, General Website, Corporate Social Responsibility (2025), W3 Awards
