= Ring Pop =

Brand of fruit flavored lollipops introduced in 1977

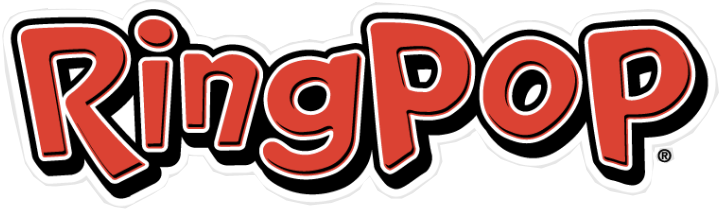

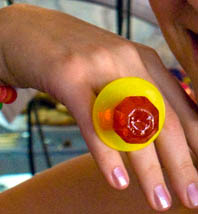
- A Ring Pop on the hand of actress Melissa Joan Hart
- Product type: Fruit flavored lollipop
- Current owner: Apax Partners (2023–present)
- Country: United States
- Introduced: 1977; 49 years ago
- Previous owners: Topps (1977–2022); Fanatics, Inc. (2022–2023)
- Website: ringpopcandy.com

Ring Pop is a brand of fruit-flavored lollipops marketed as a wearable plastic ring with a large hard candy jewel. It comes in an assortment of flavors and colors. Bazooka Candy Brands (BCB) manufactures its product line.

In October 2023, BCB and its portfolio of brands were acquired by Apax Partners.

== History ==
Ring Pops were invented in 1977 by Frank Richards who was a product engineer at the Topps Company. He wanted to help his daughter in breaking her thumb-sucking habit, so he invented the Ring Pop as a treat to eliminate her addiction.

The candy is similar to a baby pacifier, where the jewel is made of hard candy and is attached to a plastic disc that clamps around a finger. It was thought to be a solution to get kids to stop their thumb-sucking habit, while enjoying a piece of candy instead of sucking on their thumb.

While the Ring Pop was not the first piece of candy jewelry, it did follow in the footsteps of other jewelry-themed candies, such as the candy necklace and candy bracelet, both of which were released in 1958, almost two decades before the invention of the Ring Pop.

In March 2025, Bazooka Candy Brands opened a new 120,000-square-foot manufacturing facility in Moosic, Pennsylvania, replacing its former 30,000-square-foot plant in Scranton, Pennsylvania, which closed in August 2024 due to structural issues. The Moosic facility, a multimillion-dollar investment, is designed to produce 1.5 million Ring Pops daily, up from the Scranton plant's capacity of 280 million candies annually, to meet growing demand for the candy. The move retained 98% of the Scranton workforce, with the new plant employing 110 workers.

== Media ==
The debut of Ring Pops on television was in the early 1980s, catching many children's attention with its memorable theme song and the famous phrase, "It's a lollipop, without a stick! A ring of flavor you can lick!"

The commercial entails many children eating and having fun with Ring Pops. However, there is a scene with two children, a boy and a girl, where the little boy is supposedly proposing to the little girl with the Ring Pop. This scene has become a signature staple over the years and is one of the most memorable scenes in Ring Pop commercial history.

== Flavors ==
The candy was originally available in two flavors, Cherry and Grape. Over time, Ring Pop has expanded into an array of flavors such as Blue Raspberry, Strawberry, Watermelon, Lime, and Apple.

Ring Pop Sours came into the mix in the 1980s in flavors such as:

- Sour Green Apple
- Sour Cherry Berry
- Sour Watermelon
- Sour Lemonade
- Sour Cherry
- Sour Raspberry Lemonade

Topps has also released Ring Pop, "twisted" multi-flavored lollipops, which come in flavors such as Berry Blast and Citrus Craze and "creamy" varieties such as Strawberry Ice Cream.

Most recently, in 2013, Topps came out with Ring Pop Gummies as an alternative to the original hard candy. Special Ring Pops are made for some holidays. Easter Ring Pops use the traditional plastic ring but replace the gem-shaped hard candy with chicks or bunnies.

In 2011, Bazooka issued Ring Pops encrusted with Swarovski Crystal and colored with Maverick Blue to the Dallas Mavericks for their winning of the 2011 NBA Finals. Topps launched Ring Pop Gummies in 2013, a wearable and edible gummy version of the candy.

=== Dietary ===
Bazooka Candy Brands claims Ring Pops to be one of their best-selling candies among Orthodox Jews because it is one of the few kosher candies.

== See also ==
- List of confectionery brands
- Whistle Pops
- Baby Bottle Pop
