= Salsa Labs =

Software as a service company based in Bethesda, Maryland, US

- Formation: 2003
- Type: Private
- Headquarters: Bethesda, Maryland
- Location: United States
- Website: www.salsalabs.com

Salsa Labs, Inc. is a Bethesda, Maryland–based software as a service (SaaS) company that provides donor management, digital marketing, online fundraising, online advocacy, and peer-to-peer fundraising tools to more than 3,000 nonprofit organizations in North America and around the world.

It was founded as a nonprofit, DemocracyInAction.org (DIA), in 2003. WiredForChange.com (founded in 2005), a sister company, catered to political and 501(c)6 organizations until WiredForChange.com and DemocracyInAction.org united efforts and intentions by establishing Salsa Labs in 2007.

On August 1, 2011, Salsa Labs received a $5 million Series A investment from the New Jersey–based investment firm Edison Ventures.

In 2013, Salsa Labs partnered with Lobbyit, a bipartisan lobbying firm, to roll out its new Tier 4 service, which combined Lobbyit's lobbying services with Salsa Labs’ advocacy platform.

In May 2014, Salsa Labs received another $5 million from Edison and Maryland Venture Partners. Later that year, in October 2014, Salsa Labs acquired social fundraising and events platform Givezooks!. In November 2015, Salsa Labs merged with leading donor management platform DonorPro.

In April 2018, Salsa Labs was acquired by private equity firm Accel-KKR.

In June 2021, Salsa Labs was acquired by EveryAction. Three months later, Apax Partners acquired EveryAction from Insight Partners and Social Solutions from Vista Equity Partners, combining them with CyberGrants, a company it agreed to acquire in June from Waud Capital Partners.

Salsa Labs is now Bonterra. EveryAction, along with CyberGrants, GiveGab, Network for Good, Salsa Labs, and Social Solutions, all fall under the Bonterra name.
