= Mobilize =

Mobilize may refer to:

- Mobilize (company), an American political technology platform
- Mobilize (Anti-Flag album) (2002)
- Mobilize (Grant-Lee Phillips album) (2001)
- Mobilize.org, an American not-for-profit
- Mobilize (marque), a mobility company owned by Renault
  - Mobilize Duo, a two-seater electric quadricycle by Renault

== See also ==
- Mobilization (disambiguation)
