= Apax Global Alpha =

British financial company

- Company type: Public company
- Traded as: LSE: APAX
- Industry: Financial services
- Founded: 2015; 10 years ago
- Headquarters: London, United Kingdom
- Key people: Tim Breedon (Chairman)
- Products: Investment trust
- Website: www.apaxglobalalpha.com

Apax Global Alpha (LSE: APAX) is a large British investment trust focused on private equity investments. Established in 2015, the company was listed on the London Stock Exchange until it was taken private by Apax Partners in September 2025.

The chairman is Tim Breedon CBE. The fund is managed by Apax Guernsey Managers.

In July 2025, Apax Partners made an offer to take Apax Global Alpha private in a deal worth circa £800 million.
