= Bestinvest =

British online investing platform

- Type: Private
- Industry: Financial services
- Founded: 1986; 40 years ago
- Headquarters: 45 Gresham Street, London, UK
- Area served: United Kingdom
- Key people: Chris Kenny (CEO); Dame Anne Richards (Chair)
- Products: ISA, SIPP, Income drawdown, Investment
- AUM: £3 billion
- Parent: Evelyn Partners
- Website: bestinvest.co.uk

Bestinvest is an investment and a financial coaching company based in London. It provides execution-only investment services predominantly to private investors, as well as financial planning, investment management and investment advisory services as part of the Evelyn Partners Group.

== History ==
The company was founded in 1986 by John Spiers.

The company promoted the use of online fund supermarkets and established a Discretionary Investment Management arm. In July 2007 it was bought by management and 3i. The company acquired HW Financial Services, the financial services arm of Haines Watts the accountancy group, in January 2010.

In November 2013, Bestinvest received the backing of private equity firm Permira.

In February 2014, Permira agreed to buy the investment manager Tilney from Deutsche Bank with the ambition of creating a wealth manager with 9 billion of assets. After completion of the deal in May 2014 Bestinvest and Tilney combined to create Tilney Bestinvest. Bestinvest remained as a separate brand focusing on execution-only investing whilst Tilney was introduced as a brand focusing on Investment Management and Financial Planning.

In June 2022, following Tilney's merger with Smith & Williamson, the group rebranded to Evelyn Partners. Bestinvest was retained as a separate brand. In June 2026, NatWest Group completed its acquisition of Evelyn Partners.

== Operations ==
The company provides execution-only investment services to self-directed investors. It also offers investment advice, discretionary investment management and financial planning services to individuals and companies, charities and other financial institutions through the wider Evelyn Partners group. Available products include Individual Savings Accounts (ISA), unit trusts, Self-invested personal pensions (SIPP) and Venture Capital Trusts (VCT).
