= Star Wars trading card =

Type of Star Wars merchandise

Star Wars trading cards
- Card #10 from the original 1977 set: "Princess Leia - captured!"
- Manufacturers: Topps
- Publication: 1977 (49 years ago)
- Genres: Non-sports trading card
- Tie-in: Star Wars films and associated media
- Website: topps.com

Star Wars trading card usually refers to a non-sport card themed after a Star Wars movie or television show. However a common colloquial reference to trading card can also include reference to stickers, wrappers, or caps (pog) often produced along the same theme. Usually produced as either promotional or collectible memorabilia relating to Star Wars, the cards can depict anything from screen still imagery to original art. In addition, there have been various companies that have issued promotional Star Wars trading cards that include reference to or information about that corresponding company.

A large collecting and trading community of these cards and sets exists worldwide. New cards released commercially are available through most major retailers and wholesalers, however some cards are specially issued as exclusive and only available though a specific source. A secondary market also exists on eBay in various categories. Star Wars trading cards are different from the various Star Wars collectible card game cards. A few of the most valuable sets in the Star Wars Trading Cards market are the 1977 Star Wars Series I, The Star Wars Galaxy Series, Star Wars MasterWorks, along with the Star Wars 3D Widevision sets.

== History ==
Star Wars trading cards were first produced and released by Topps in 1977 to coincide with the first Star Wars movie, and they have remained the official producer of Star Wars trading cards in the United States ever since. Various manufacturers handle the property around the rest of the world.

In 1977, a photograph appeared on a Topps Star Wars trading card in which C-3PO appeared to have a prominent phallus. In 2007, the official Star Wars website hypothesized that this was caused by a part of the suit that had fallen into place just as the photograph was taken. However, in 2019 Daniels clarified that the costume had become compromised during C-3PO's oil bath in the film; the warm liquid had caused the costume to separate, leading to "an over-exposure of plastic in that region". Topps editor Gary Gerani, who wrote and photo-selected all the Star Wars card sets and pencil-designed the distinctive, often-reused 1977 front design, says he has been asked about this particular card more than any other.

In 2015, Topps created the Star Wars Card Trader app for iPhone, iPad and Android. This app allows users to open packs, collect digital cards, and trade them with other users right in the app.

In 2019 Topps began to commission original art for the app. It has produced original art card sets by Derek Laufman, Darrin Pepe, Kevin-John, Robert Jimenez, Uzuri Art and others.

Harry N. Abrams published three books collecting the art of Star Wars trading cards and stickers; the first volume, featuring the original movie's cards, was published in 2015, followed by the Empire Strikes Back and Return of the Jedi volumes in 2016.

== Card series ==
=== Topps, Inc. ===
All series are shown, but not necessarily all the cards in each series. For example, not all promos and mail-away cards are listed:

==== Vintage era ====
- Star Wars Series 1 (1977) Blue border with white stars. 66 cards and 11 stickers (space with green, yellow or red interior border) (Cards 1-66 Stickers 1-11).
- Star Wars Series 1 (1977) (Scanlens-Australia) - Blue border with white stars. 72 Card set.
- Star Wars Series 1 (1977) (Topps UK/Ireland) - Blue border with white stars. 66 Card set. No stickers.
- Star Wars Series 1 (1977) (Argentina) - Blue border with white stars. 66 cards and 11 stickers. 16 puzzle pieces.
- Star Wars Series 2 (1977) - Red border. 66 cards and 11 stickers (black or space with red interior border) (Cards 67-132 Stickers 12-22).
- Star Wars Series 2 (1977) (Topps UK/Ireland) - Red border. 66 cards. (Cards 1A-66A. No stickers).
- Star Wars Series 3 (1977) - Yellow border. 66 cards and 11 stickers (black film cell border) (Cards 133-198 Stickers 23-33).
- Star Wars Series 4 (1977) - Green border. 66 cards and 11 stickers (red film cell border) (Cards 199-264 Stickers 34-44).
- Star Wars Series 5 (1977) - Orange border. 66 cards and 11 stickers (orange film cell border) (Cards 265-330 Stickers 45-55).
- Star Wars Sugar-Free Gum Wrappers (1977/78) - 56 wrappers.
- Star Wars The Empire Strikes Back, Series 1 (1980) - Red border. 132 cards and 33 stickers.
- Star Wars The Empire Strikes Back, Series 2 (1980) - Blue border. 132 cards and 33 stickers.
- Star Wars The Empire Strikes Back, Series 3 (1980) - Yellow border. 88 cards and 22 stickers.
- Star Wars The Empire Strikes Back Giant Photo Cards (1980) - 30 5x7 cards.
- Star Wars Return of the Jedi, Series 1 (1983) - Red border. 132 cards and 33 stickers.
- Star Wars Return of the Jedi, Series 2 (1983) - Blue border. 88 cards and 22 stickers.

==== Modern era ====
- Star Wars Galaxy Series I (1993) - 140 base and 6 etched foil cards, plus separate 140 silver stamped base, 6 refractor foil, and one holographic card from the Millennium Falcon Factory set.
- Star Wars Galaxy Series II (1994) - 135 base and 6 etched foil cards, plus separate 135 silver stamped base, 6 refractor foil, and one holographic card from the Factory Tin.
- Star Wars Galaxy Series III (1995) - 90 base, 90 first-day, 12 Lucas art, 6 etched foil, and 6 clearzone cards.
- Star Wars Widevision (1995) - 120 base and 10 finest cards.
- Star Wars Widevision Metal (1995) - 6 steel cards.
- Star Wars The Empire Strikes Back Widevision (1995) - 144 base, 10 chromium, and 6 poster cards
- Star Wars The Empire Strikes Back Widevision Metal (1995) - 6 steel cards.
- Star Wars Return of the Jedi Widevision (1996) - 144 base, 10 finest, 6 poster cards, plus 1 3d case-topper card.
- Star Wars Caps (1995) - 70 base, 10 galaxy, and 24 slammer caps.
- Star Wars Master Visions (1995) - 36 oversized cards.
- Star Wars Finest (1996) - 90 base, 4 matrix, 6 embossed, and 90 refractor cards.
- Star Wars 3Di Widevision (1996) - 63 base and 1 motion card, all widevision.
- Star Wars Shadows of the Empire (1996) - 80 base, 6 foil, and 4 embossed cards.
- Star Wars Vehicles (1997) - 72 base, 4 cut-away, and 2 3d cards.
- Star Wars Trilogy: The Complete Story, Retail (1997) - 72 base and 6 laser cards, all widevision.
- Star Wars Trilogy Special Edition, Hobby (1997) - 72 base, 6 laser, 2 hologram, and 1 3Di cards, all widevision.
- Star Wars Chrome Archives (1999) - 90 base, 9 chrome, and 4 clear cards.

==== Prequel era ====
- Star Wars Episode I: The Phantom Menace Widevision, Series I (1999) - 80 base, 40 expansion, 8 chrome, 10 foil cards, and 16 stickers. Also 5 oversized foil cards exist from tin sets.
- Star Wars Episode I: The Phantom Menace Widevision, Series II (1999) - 80 base, 6 embossed (retail), 6 embossed (hobby), 4 chromium (retail), 4 chromium (hobby), and 3 box topper cards.
- Star Wars Episode I 3D Widevision (2000) - 46 base and 2 multi-motion cards, all widevision. 1 promotional card.
- Star Wars Evolution (2001) - 93 base, 12 A, 8 B, and autograph cards. 4 promotional cards.
- Star Wars Episode II: Attack of the Clones (2002) - 100 base, 10 silver foil, 8 prismatic, and 5 panoramic cards. 5 promotional cards.
- Star Wars Episode II: Attack of the Clones Widevision (2002) - 80 base and 26 autograph cards. 7 promotional cards.
- Star Wars Clone Wars (2004) - 90 base, 10 battle motion, and 14 artists' sketch cards, and 10 stickers. 3 promotional cards.
- Star Wars Heritage (2004) - 120 base, 12 etched foil, autograph, and sketch cards, and 30 stickers. 6 promotional cards.
- Star Wars Revenge of the Sith (2005) - 90 base, 6 etched foil (hobby/retail), 4 morphing (hobby/retail), 3 holograms, 10 tattoo, 10 embossed foil, 10 stickers, and 1 morphing case-topper. 5 promotional cards.
- Star Wars Revenge of the Sith Widevision (2005) - 80 base, 10 chrome (retail), 10 chrome (hobby), 10 flix-pix, and 5 autograph cards. 2 promotional cards.

==== Post-Saga era ====
- Star Wars Evolution Update (2006) - 90 base, 20 A, 15 B, sequentially numbered C (100 each of 1C and 2C), 1D redemption card, 10 Galaxy Crystal (retail), 6 foil, autograph cards. Two promotional cards.
- Star Wars 30th Anniversary (August 2007) - 120 base, 120 red/120 blue/120 gold parallel (gold parallels numbered to 30), 27 triptych puzzle, autograph, sketch, 330 different foil stamped box loaders, 9 animation cel, 9 magnet cards, and 3 retail bonus cards. Six promotional cards.
- Star Wars Clone Wars (July 2008) - 90 base, 90 gold-stamped foil parallel, 10 animation cel, 10 foil, 5 motion, 5 Target red animation cel, 5 Wal-Mart blue animation cel cards. Two promotional cards.
- Star Wars Clone Wars Trading Card Stickers (October 2008) - 90 base, 10 foil stickers, 10 die cut pop ups, 10 temporary tattoos, ~10 magnet cards.
- Star Wars Holiday Special (2008) - 11 cards.
- Star Wars Galaxy Series IV (2009) 120 base. Only 11,000 boxes produced.
- Star Wars Clone Wars Widevision, Season I (November 2009) - 80 base, 8 Series 2 Preview cards, 80 Silver Foil stamped parallel cards (500 sequentially numbered of each card), 80 Gold Foil stamped 1/1 parallel cards, 20 foil character cards, 10 animation clear cel cards, 5 flex pix cards, sketch cards, animator sketch cards, 13 autograph cards
- Star Wars Galaxy Series V (2010) 120 base.
- Star Wars The Empire Strikes Back 3D Widevision (2010) - 48 base cards. One promotional card. Sketch Cards. 8 Autograph Cards
- Star Wars Clone Wars Rise of the Bounty Hunters, Season II (2010)
- Star Wars Clone Wars Dog Tags Trading Cards (November 2010) - 24 cards and matching dog tags.
- Star Wars Galaxy Series VI (2011) 120 Base. (One of the most scarce and valuable Star Wars trading card sets of all-time.)
- Star Wars Dog Tags Trading Cards (August 2011) - 24 cards and matching dog tags.
- Star Wars Galaxy Series VII (2012) 110 base.
- Star Wars Galactic Files (2012)
- Star Wars Jedi Legacy (2013)
- Star Wars Galactic Files, Series II (2013)
- Star Wars Illustrated (2013)
- Star Wars Return of the Jedi 3D Widevision (2014) - 44 base cards. Limited to 2000 sets offered directly by Topps.
- Star Wars Revenge of the Sith 3D Widevision (2015) - 44 base cards. Limited to 2000 sets offered directly by Topps.
- Star Wars Masterwork (2015)
- Star Wars Attack of the Clones 3D Widevision (2016) - 44 base cards. Limited to 2500 sets offered directly by Topps.
- Star Wars Masterwork (2016)
- Star Wars The Force Awakens 3D Widevision (2017) 44 base cards. Limited to 2000 sets offered directly by Topps.
- Star Wars Masterwork (2017)
- Star Wars Chrome Perspectives: Jedi Vs. Sith - 100 base cards and many others
- Star Wars Galaxy Series 2018 (2018) 100 base.
- Star Wars Masterwork (2018)
- Star Wars Masterwork (2019)

=== O-Pee-Chee ===
- Star Wars, Series 1 (1977) - Blue border with white stars. 66 cards. 11 stickers.
- Star Wars, Series 2 (1977) - Red border, Card Numbers: 67-132 - Sticker Numbers: 12-22
- Star Wars, Series 3 (1977) - Orange border, Card Numbers: 133-264 - Sticker Numbers: 34-55
- Star Wars, Return Of The Jedi (1983) - Red border, Card Numbers: 1-132

=== Panini ===
- Star Wars (Panini European, 1977) - 256 stickers.
- Star Wars Return of the Jedi (Panini, 1983) - 180 2 1/8"x3" album stickers
- Star Wars (Panini European, 1997) - 216 stickers.
- Star Wars (Panini American, 1997) - 66 stickers.

=== Metallic Images ===
- Star Wars (Metallic Images, 1994) - 20 metal cards
- Star Wars Art of Ralph McQuarrie (Metallic Images, 1996) - 20 metal cards
- Star Wars Bounty Hunters (Metallic Images, 1998) - 6 metal cards
- Star Wars Dark Empire (Metallic Images, 1995-6) - two 6 series of metal cards
- Star Wars Jedi Knights (Metallic Images, 1998) - 6 metal cards
- Star Wars Shadows of the Empire (Metallic Images, 1997) - 6 metal cards
- Star Wars The Empire Strikes Back (Metallic Images, 1995) - 20 metal cards
- Star Wars Return of the Jedi (Metallic Images, 1995) - 20 metal cards

=== Other ===
- Star Wars Wonder Bread (1977) - 16 card set.
- Star Wars (Tokyo Queen, 1977) - 32 card set.
- Star Wars (ADPAC Stickers for General Mills Breakfast Cereals, 1977) - 16 card set.
- Star Wars (General Mills, 1978) - 16 card set.
- Star Wars Empire Strikes Back (Burger King & Coca-Cola, 1981) - 36 cards.
- Star Wars, Special Edition, Trilogy (Merlin, 1997) - 125 cards

== See also ==
- Non-sports trading card
- Star Wars Customizable Card Game
- Star Wars Trading Card Game
