= Baltic Classifieds =

Lithuanian company

Baltic Classifieds Group plc
- Type: Public
- Traded as: LSE: BCG; FTSE 250 component
- Founded: 1999
- Headquarters: Vilnius, Lithuania
- Key people: Trevor Mather (Chairman); Justinas Šimkus (CEO)
- Services: Classified portals
- Revenue: ▲€88.5 million (2026)
- Operating income: ▲€60.4 million (2026)
- Net income: ▲€50.9 million (2026)
- Website: balticclassifieds.com

Baltic Classifieds Group is a Lithuanian company that specialises in classified portals. The company was established in 1999 and is headquartered in Vilnius, Lithuania. It is listed on the London Stock Exchange and is a constituent of the FTSE 250 Index.

== History ==
The company was established with the launch of two classified portals in Estonia in 1999. It subsequently expanded by acquisition creating an enlarged portfolio including portals in Latvia and Lithuania.

The company was acquired by Eesti Meedia Group in 2014 and by funds managed by Apax Partners in May 2019. It was then the subject of an initial public offering on the London Stock Exchange in July 2021. In August 2021 FTSE Russell announced that, based on the size of its market capitalisation (circa £1.2 billion at that time), the company was an indicative candidate for inclusion in the FTSE 250 Index.

In 2023, the company became the third unicorn company in Lithuania after Vinted and Nord Security.
