= Ole Smoky Distillery =

Distillery in Gatlinburg, Tennessee

Coordinates: 35.71087°N 83.51936°W

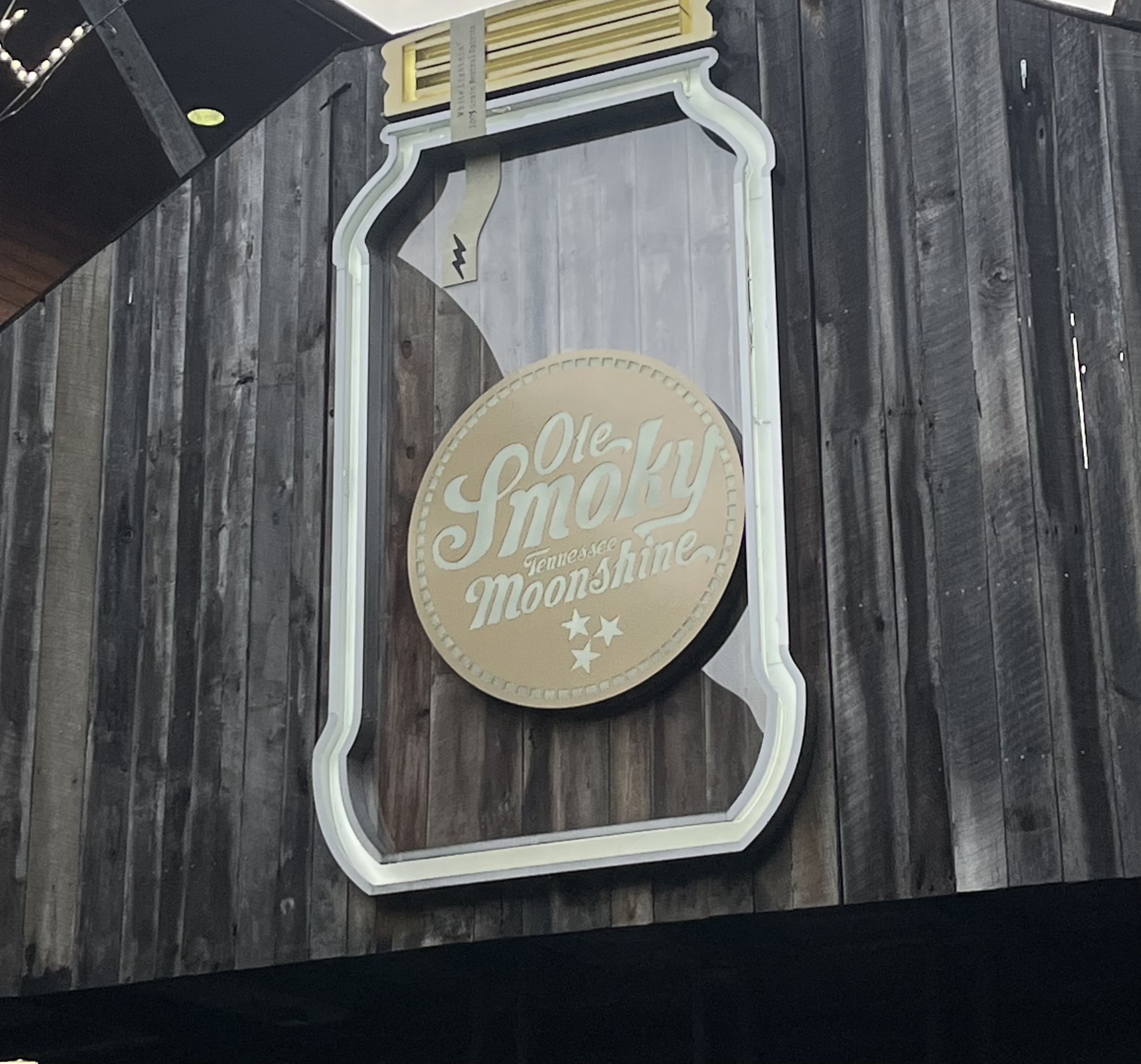
- Entrance to Ole Smoky Moonshine Holler in 2026
- Industry: Distillery
- Founded: July 4, 2010; 16 years ago in Gatlinburg, Tennessee
- Headquarters: Gatlinburg, TN
- Website: olesmoky.com

Ole Smoky Tennessee Moonshine is a corn whiskey distillery in Gatlinburg, Tennessee. Their downtown Gatlinburg, Tennessee facility features two working copper stills. Visitors are able to see the distilling process up close while learning about the history of moonshine production in the Smoky Mountains. $5 samples are offered. A second distillery, dubbed The Barn, opened in fall 2014 in Pigeon Forge. From 2020 to 2022, the Ole Smoky Distillery was the most visited distillery in the world.

== History ==
When Tennessee state law changed to allow the distillation of spirits, Ole Smoky Distillery, LLC became the first federally licensed distillery in the history of East Tennessee. The distillery opened the weekend of July 4, 2010. At opening, it was one of only four distilleries operating in the state. Jack Daniel's and George Dickel received their licenses before Prohibition, and Benjamin Prichard's opened their Tennessee facility in 1997.

Ole Smoky partnered with Yee-Haw Brewing Co and opened a new facility called 6th & Peabody in the heart of Nashville in the spring of 2019.

In February 2022, Apax Partners, a global private equity firm, acquired a majority stake in Ole Smoky.

Ole Smoky partnered with Yee-Haw Brewing Co to build a new distillery in Myrtle Beach, South Carolina, set to open in 2026.

== Products ==
Currently, Ole Smoky Tennessee Moonshine nationally retails fifteen flavors of moonshine made using authentic East Tennessee recipes, jarred and shipped directly from the company's Gatlinburg distillery. Original Moonshine (100 proof), White Lightnin' (100 proof), Lightnin' Line (80 proof): Strawberry Lightnin', Lemon Drop Lightnin' and Hunch Punch Lightnin', and the 40 proof line including: Moonshine Cherries, Peach Moonshine, Apple Pie Moonshine, Blackberry Moonshine, Strawberry Moonshine, Lemon Drop Moonshine, Pineapple Moonshine, Watermelon Moonshine, Sweet Tea Moonshine and Charred Moonshine are available selectively in 49 states and Canada. The distillery uses a 100-year-old family recipe, which was perfected with the help of Dave Pickerell, who served as the Master Distiller for Maker's Mark for over 15 years. The ingredients are locally sourced.

Ole Smoky Distillery also produces a peanut butter whiskey that received ten well-known spirits awards in November 2020.

== Media reaction ==
Media coverage of Ole Smoky's opening included a visit by the Today Show and an appearance on Martha Stewart Living Radio. They continue to garner national media coverage in major press and consumer publications.
