= Fractal Analytics =

Multinational artificial intelligence company

Fractal Analytics Limited
- Type: Public
- Traded as: NSE: FRACTAL; BSE: 544700
- Industry: Artificial intelligence
- Founded: 2000
- Founders: Srikanth Velamakanni; Pranay Agrawal
- Headquarters: Mumbai, India; New York City, United States
- Area served: Worldwide
- Revenue: ▲₹2,765 crore (US$300 million) (FY25)
- Net income: ▲₹221 crore (US$24 million) (FY25)
- Number of employees: 4,600 (May 2024)
- Website: fractal.ai

Fractal Analytics Limited is an artificial intelligence and data analytics company based in Mumbai, India, with a second headquarter in New York City.

== History ==
Fractal Analytics was founded in 2000 in Mumbai by Srikanth Velamakanni, Pranay Agrawal, Nirmal Palaparthi, Pradeep Suryanarayan and Ramakrishna Reddy. It later moved to the US in 2005. In 2015, it acquired Imagna Analytics and Mobius Innovations.

In 2016, Fractal Analytics appointed Pranay Agrawal as the CEO to replace co-founder Srikanth Velamakanni, the new Group Chief Executive and Executive Vice-Chairman. It also created two new subsidiaries Qure.ai and Cuddle.ai.

In August 2016, Fractal Analytics partnered with KNIME, an open source data analytics platform. In June 2017, the company acquired Chicago-based strategy & analytics firm, 4i Inc. In September 2017, it partnered with Final Mile to combine data science with behavioral science In March 2018, Fractal Analytics acquired behavioural architecture company Final Mile. In January 2019, Fractal received a $200 million funding from Apax Partners.

In January 2022, Fractal became a unicorn company after raising $360 million from private equity firm TPG.

In February 2026, Fractal Analytics held an initial public offering aggregating about ₹2,834 crore (US$300 million), which was subscribed 2.66 times. Described as the first Indian artificial intelligence company to go public, its shares were listed on the National Stock Exchange of India and Bombay Stock Exchange on 16 February 2026, debuting at a discount to the issue price.
