= Push Pop =

Brand of fruit-flavored lollipops

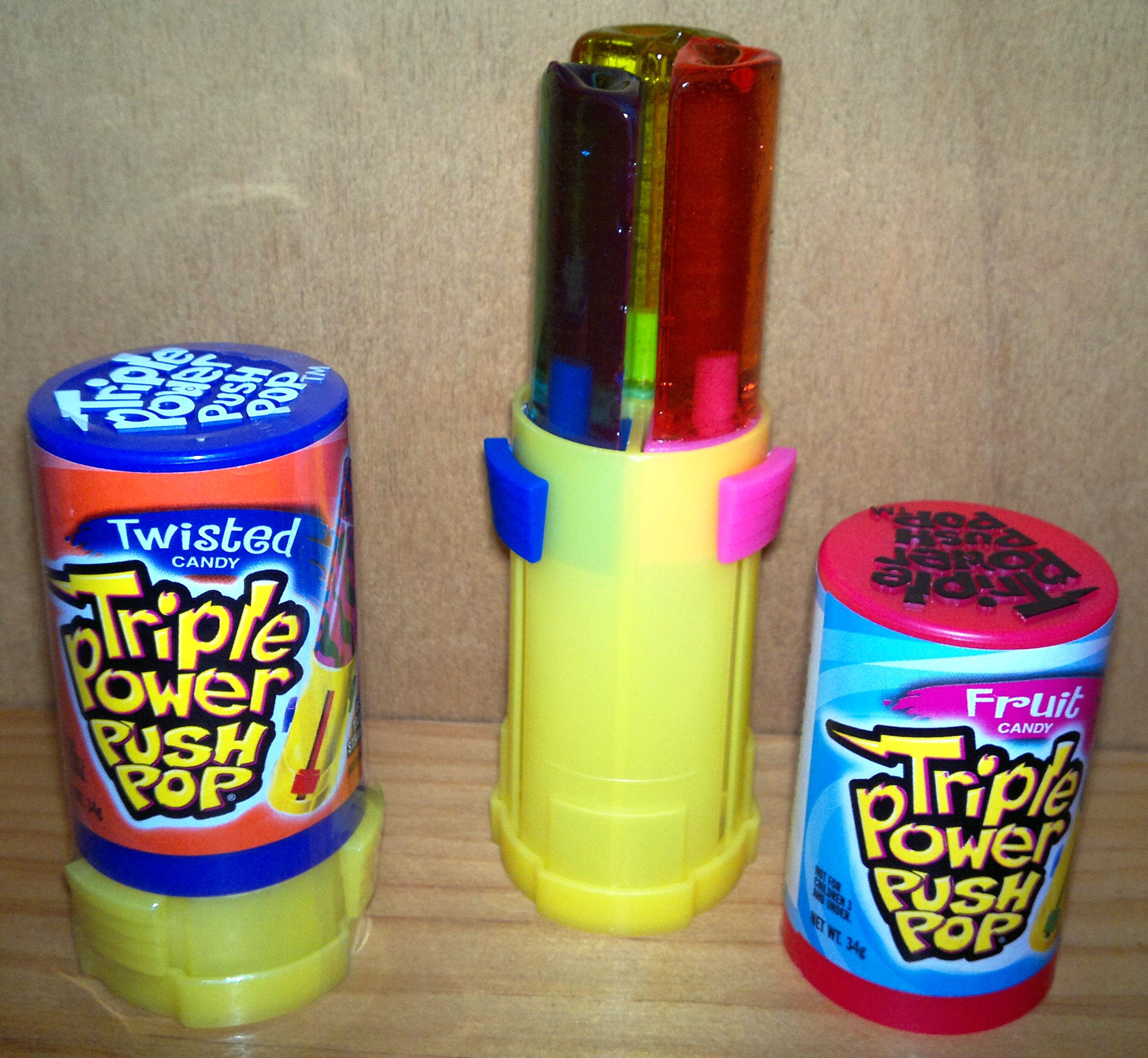
- Push Pops (Triple Power flavour)
- Product type: Lollipop
- Current owner: Apax Partners (2023–present)
- Country: United States
- Introduced: 1986; 40 years ago
- Previous owners: Topps (1947–2022); Fanatics, Inc. (2022–2023)

Push Pop is an American brand of fruit-flavored lollipops produced in Taiwan (and other Southeast Asian countries). It debuted in 1986 and comes in a variety of flavors.

Products made under the Push Pop name are manufactured by Bazooka Candy Brands (BCB), owner of a portfolio of confectionery brands. In October 2023, it was announced that BCB had its purchase completed by Apax Partners.

== Overview ==
The product's gimmick is that the lollipop takes the form of a long cylinder that retracts into a capped plastic tube, and must be "pushed" out for consumption. Push Pop varieties include Original, spring-loaded Jumbo, Triple Power, Flip-N-Dip, push pop sliderz, and Push Pump Spray.

In 2020, the Push Pop Gummy Roll was added to the line of Push Pop candies. The gummy roll comes in a tape-like dispenser that allows the consumer to pull out a strand of the roll and tear it off to get their desired piece of sanded gummy candy. This new Push pop candy comes in 4 different flavors: Strawberry, Watermelon, Blue Raspberry, and Berry Blast. Creating gummy candy was somewhat of a departure for Push Pop, as the brand focuses on creating a fun experience for eating lollipops. The Push Pop Gummy Roll was first announced in May 2019 at the Sweets & Snacks Expo in Chicago.

It has proven to be a popular product with children, winning the Candy Industry Kid’s Choice award for Best Novelty candy.
