= Lobbyit =

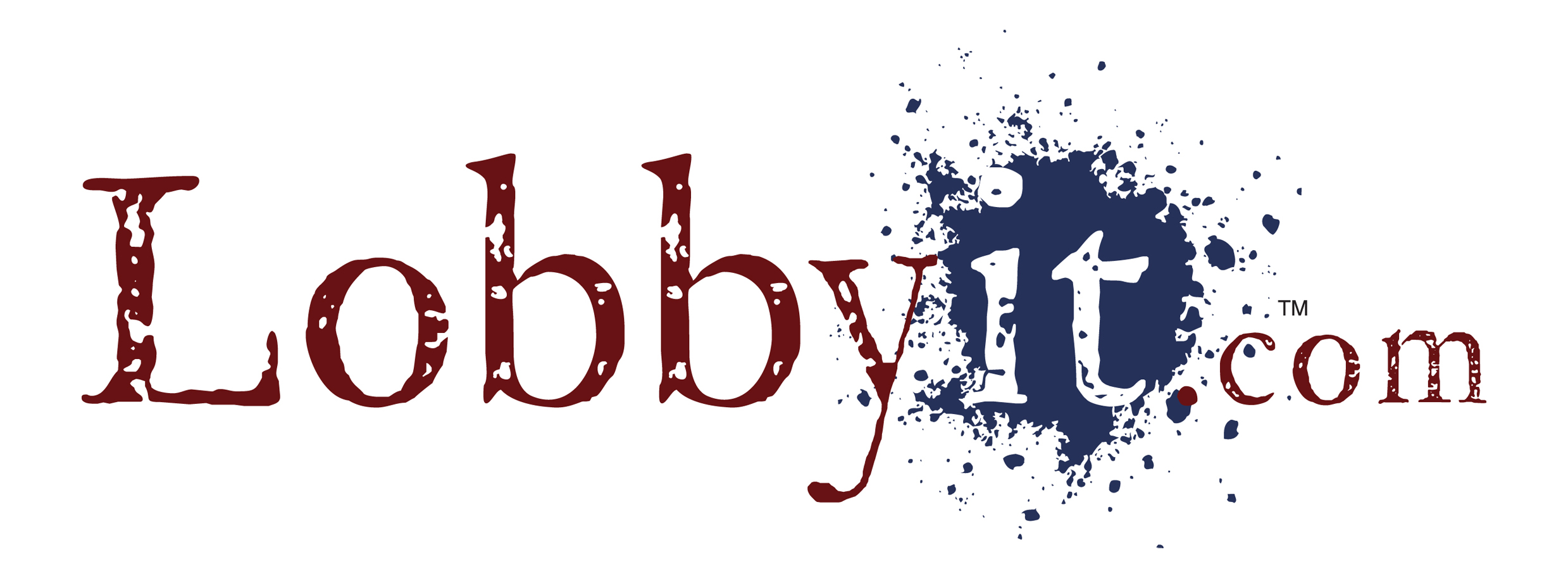
- Industry: Federal lobbying
- Founded: 2009
- Founder: Paul Kanitra
- Headquarters: 430 New Jersey Ave, SE, Washington, DC
- Website: www.lobbyit.com

Lobbyit is a bipartisan lobbying firm headquartered in Washington, D.C. It was founded as a one-man shop in 2009 by company president Paul Kanitra. By 2014, Lobbyit had grown to seven employees and projected $1 million in annual revenue. The firm is known for its pricing structure, which is “unique” among DC lobbying firms: it offers its clients set monthly prices based on a tier system with retainers that are much lower than traditional lobbying firms and month-to-month contracts.

== History ==
Lobbyit was founded in 2009 by Paul Kanitra, who began his lobbying career working on behalf of the Associated Locksmiths of America and the Reno-Sparks Indian Colony. He later moved onto governmental relations at Carfax, where he worked for five years until deciding to open his own lobbying firm.

In 2013, Lobbyit partnered with Salsa Labs, the developers of an online-based organization software platform to offer clients new grassroots advocacy options. With the partnership finalized, Lobbyit announced that it would be rolling out its new Tier 4 service, which combined Lobbyit's lobbying services with Salsa Labs’ advocacy platform. Later that year, Lobbyit was featured in a Voice of America China video report entitled “China: Democracy in America: Right to Petition” that examined the federal lobbying industry and its role in American democracy.

In 2014, Lobbyit was one of InTheCapital's annual 50 on Fire, which “celebrates visionary individuals and companies across DC's top industries.” Corporate Vision Magazine named Lobbyit Best Lobbying Firm & Government Affairs Consultancy in the United States.

== Operations ==
Unlike many other federal lobbying firms which charge tens of thousands of dollars monthly for their services, Lobbyit charges lower prices and offers month-to-month contracts. In 2014, its most expensive service offering cost $4,999 monthly and all of its clients paid less than $60,000 per year. Company founder and president Kanitra has said the inspiration for the company's pricing structure came from companies such as McDonald's, Wal-Mart, and Amazon.com.

== Staff ==
- Paul Kanitra, founder and president
- Karl Stark, vice president
- Quardricos Driskell, senior director of government relations
- Jonathan Rotman, government relations manager
- Victoria Chege, government relations coordinator

== Clients ==
Lobbyit has represented over 100 clients, including businesses, associations, non-profits, municipalities, and colleges and universities. Instead of lobbying on broad issues such as health care policy, most of Lobbyit's registered lobbyists concentrate on assisting individual businesses or groups with specific issues. As of 2014, the majority of Lobbyit's client base have never hired a lobbyist before, and the company educates these new clients on how the American federal government operates as a part of its services.

Notable clients include the Aircraft Mechanics Fraternal Association; the American Jail Association; Carfax; Brick Industry Association; the city of Plano, Texas; the city of Point Pleasant Beach, New Jersey; Hobby Distillers Association; the National Child Care Association; the National Council of Investigation and Security Services; Texas Christian University; and the World Floor Covering Association.

In 2017, it was announced that Lobbyit had been working with Brick Industry Association (BIA) since 2012. BIA scheduled an average of 20 Capitol Hill visits annually before working with Lobbyit, which was able to schedule an average of 100 annual Capitol Hill visits for BIA members.
