= Whistle Pops =

Brand of sweets

Whistle Pops/Melody Pops
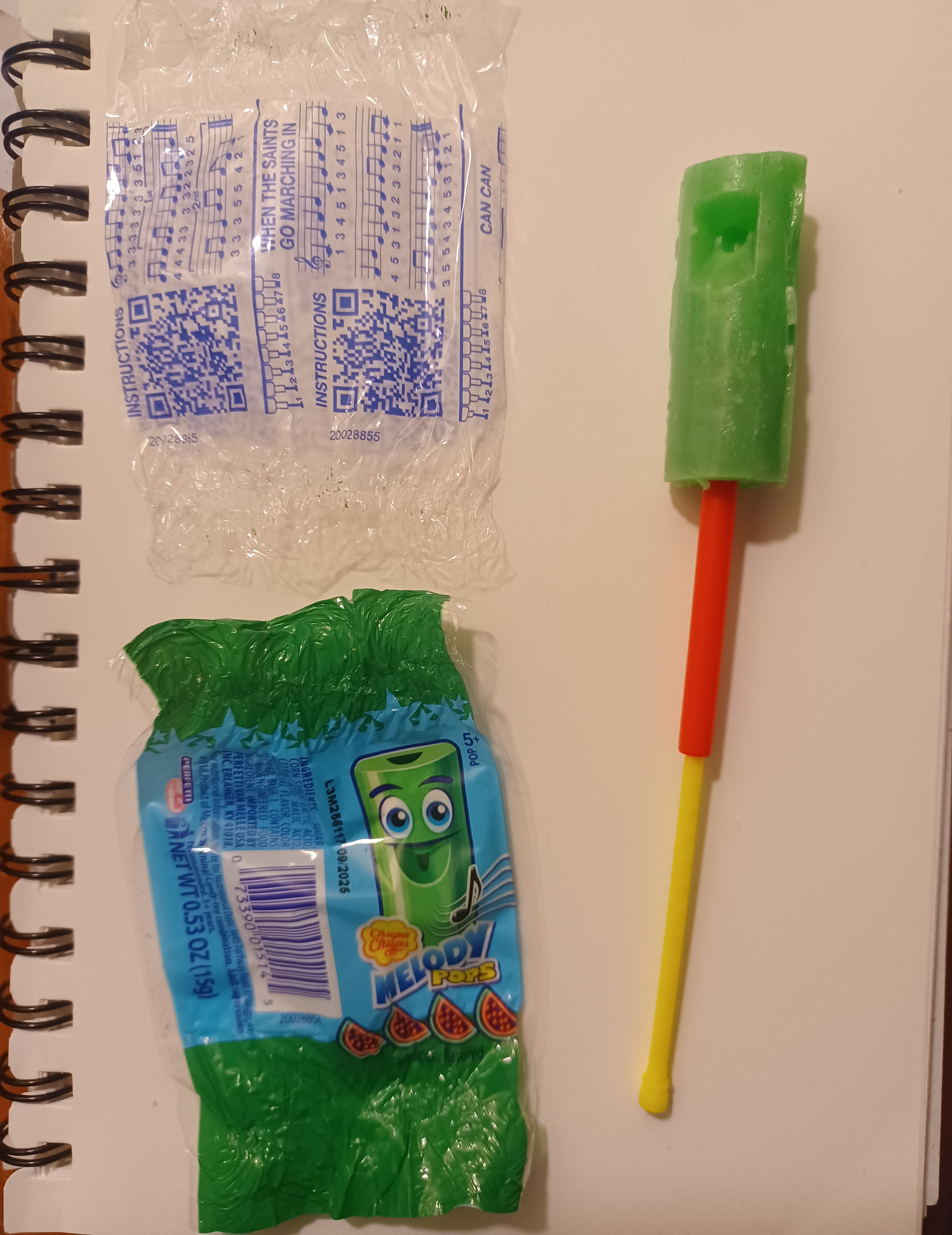
- An unwrapped Melody Pop
- Region or state: Worldwide
- Main ingredients: Sugar, Glucose Syrup
- Food energy (per 15g serving): 57 kcal (240 kJ)
Nutritional value
(per 15g serving)
- Protein: 0.0 g
- Fat: 0.0 g
- Carbohydrate: 14.1 g

Whistle Pops (called Melody Pops in some countries) are a lollipop brand formerly produced by Spangler Candy Company, now produced by Chupa Chups, starting in the 1970s that are designed to make a whistling sound. They are produced with a hole in them, and when blown into, a whistling sound emanates from the confectionery.

== Reintroduction ==
After their being discontinued for a few years, candy company Chupa Chups reintroduced Whistle Pops, renaming them Melody Pops, and began marketing them in the United States. Melody Pops are marketed with a tagline stating "play real music". The Melody Pop's handle contains a slide whistle-like plunger. Each lollipop's inner wrapper has sheet music printed on it. Each note is numbered, so the whistler can change the notes they play by sliding the plunger up and down to the different numbers engraved on the plunger.

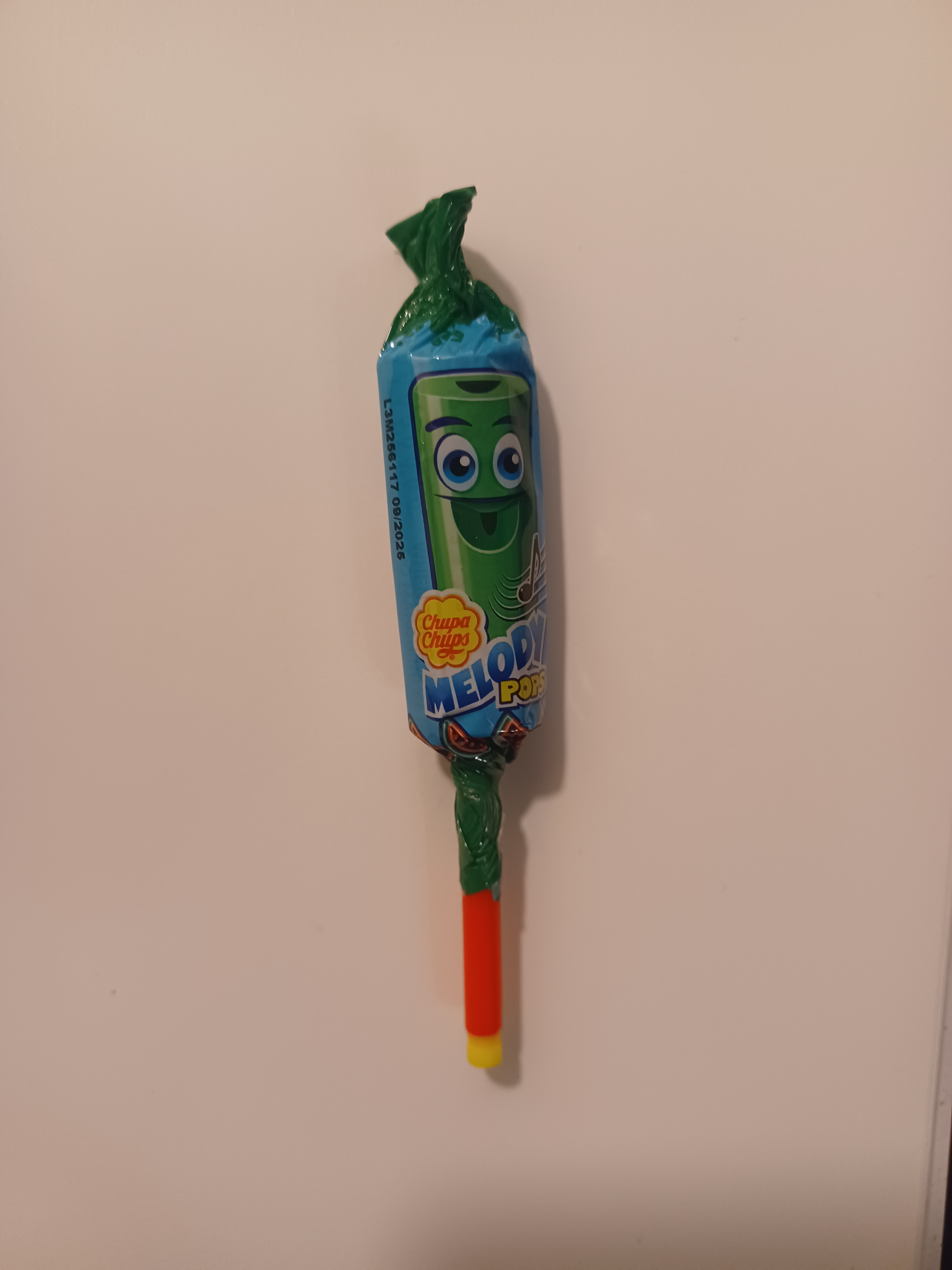
A wrapped Melody Pop with its plunger completely retracted.

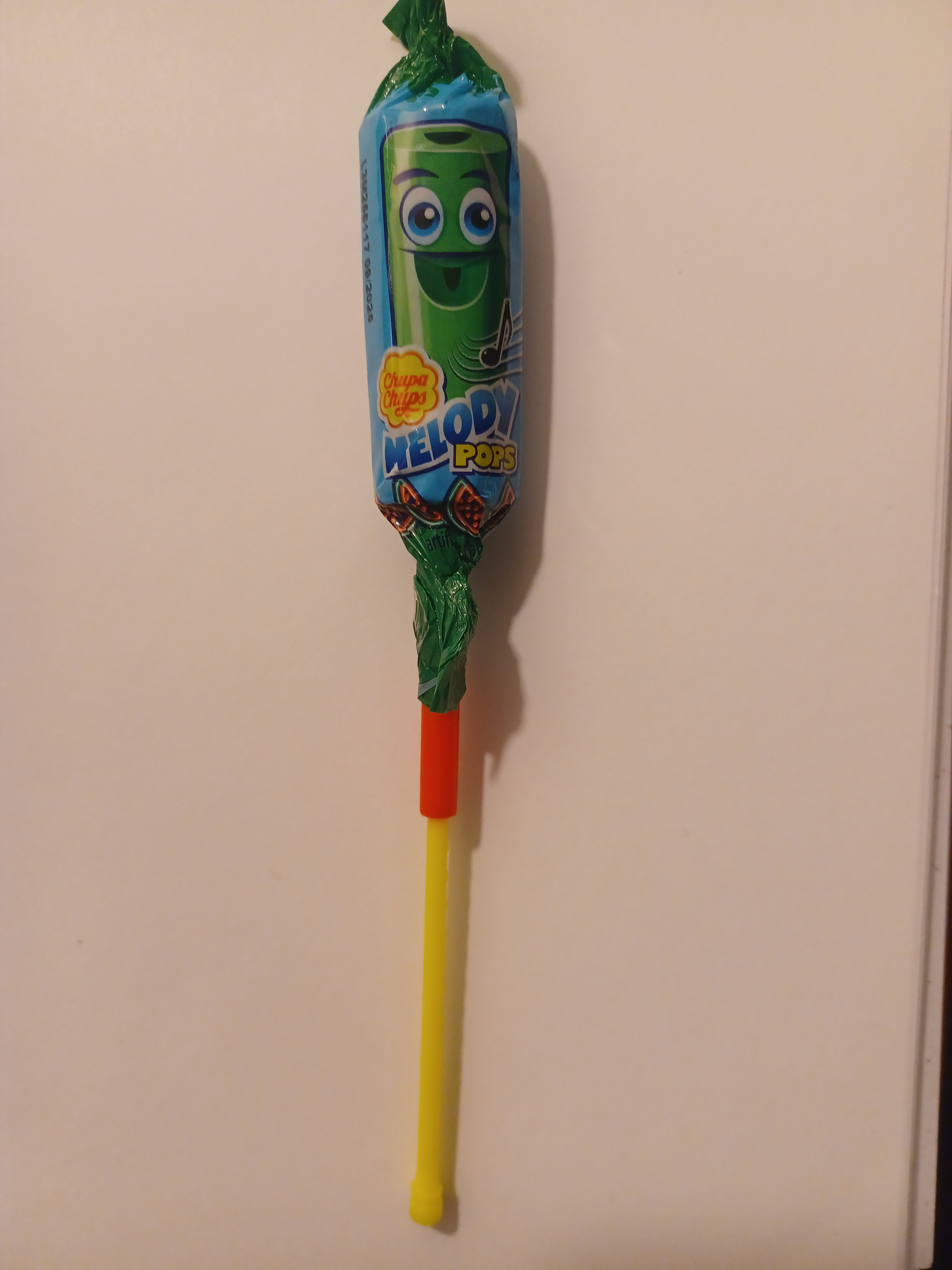
A Melody Pop with its plunger completely extended.

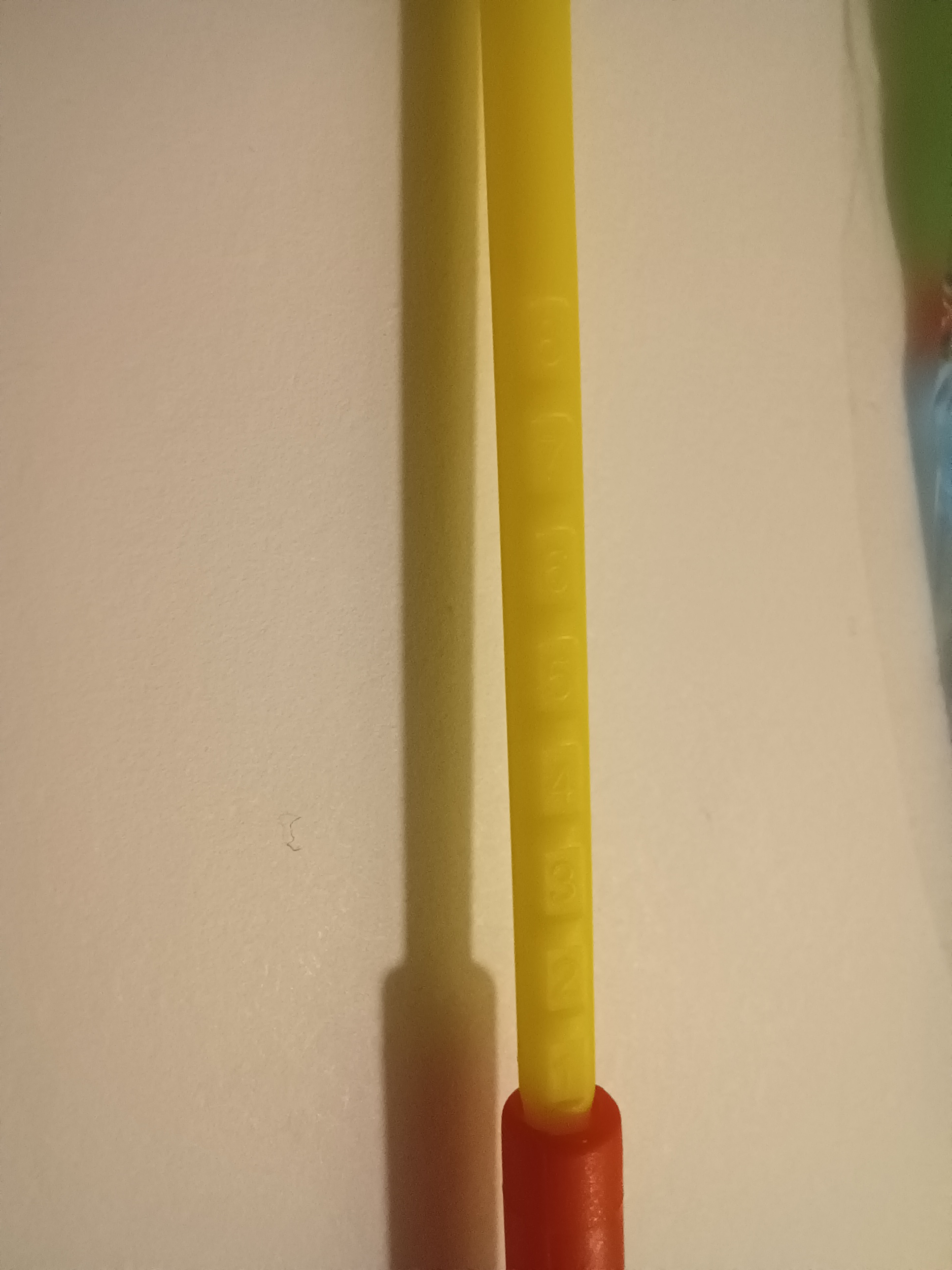
The numbers printed on the whistle's plunger.

== In the United Kingdom ==
In the United Kingdom some pharmacies stock Whistle Pops.

== See also ==
- List of candies
- List of confectionery brands
- Ring Pop
