= Evelyn Partners =

Financial services company

Evelyn Partners Group Limited
- Type: Limited Company
- Industry: Wealth Management, Investment Management, Financial Planning
- Founded: 1836; 190 years ago
- Headquarters: London, England, UK
- Area served: United Kingdom; Republic of Ireland
- Key people: Chris Kenny (CEO); Dame Anne Richards (Chair)
- AUM: ▲£68.6 billion (2026)
- Owners: NatWest Group
- Website: www.evelyn.com

Evelyn Partners is a wealth management company based in the United Kingdom offering financial planning and investment management services. In February 2026, NatWest Group agreed to acquire Evelyn Partners in a deal valued at approximately £2.7 billion. It is formerly known as Tilney Smith & Williamson, which was the result of a 2020 merger between Tilney and Smith & Williamson.

With over £68 billion in assets under management, it is a UK leader in wealth management.

The group also operates the online investment service Bestinvest.

== History ==
Tilney was founded in 1836 in Liverpool as a company for dealing in stocks and shares. It remained an independent business for 150 years, until it was acquired by Charterhouse Group (then owned by the Royal Bank of Scotland). In 2005, it was bought out by management in a deal backed by private equity investor Bridgepoint Capital, and in 2007 it was bought by Deutsche Bank. In 2014 it was merged with Bestinvest with the backing of investment group Permira.

Smith & Williamson was founded in 1881 in Glasgow, by David Johnstone Smith and Andrew Williamson. Over the years, the firm grew through a series of mergers and acquisitions, including the acquisitions of Belfast-based investment management firm Cunningham Coates in 2001 and accountancy firm Solomon Hare in 2005.

In 2020 Tilney merged with Smith & Williamson to create the Tilney Smith & Williamson group in a transaction backed by existing investor Permira and private equity firm Warburg Pincus.

In 2022, the company rebranded to Evelyn Partners, retaining Bestinvest as a separate brand ("Bestinvest by Evelyn Partners").

On 1 November 2024, as part of the rapid expansion of their professional services arm, Evelyn Partners acquired London-based restructuring specialist, Resolve Advisory, which included the transfer of 60 members of staff and partners.

In 2025, Evelyn Partners sold its Professional Services business to Apax Partners LLP. The business was rebranded as S&W, reflecting the legacy of Smith & Williamson.

From May 2025, Evelyn Partners will provide investment management and financial planning advice to Saracens. The new multi-year partnership deal will enable both male and female professional players to access wealth management and tailored financial coaching that extends from the period during their rugby careers to retirement and beyond.

In December 2025, it was reported that Evelyn Partners was the subject of a takeover battle, with bidders including major financial institutions such as Barclays and NatWest Group. In February 2026, NatWest agreed to acquire the company for £2.7 billion, subject to customary regulatory approvals. The acquisition completed on 30 June 2026, creating what NatWest described as the UK's leading private banking and wealth management business.

== Operations ==
The company provides wealth management, financial planning and investment management services to individuals, entrepreneurs, charities and intermediaries.

It operates offices in 25 cities in the UK, as well as in the Republic of Ireland, and the Channel Islands. Its headquarters is in Gresham Street, in the City of London.
