= Smith & Williamson =

United Kingdom financial and professional services firm

- Type: Limited Company
- Industry: Professional services
- Founded: 1881
- Headquarters: London, United Kingdom
- Key people: David Cobb & Kevin Stopps, coCEOs
- Products: Accounting; Corporate services Investment management Tax
- Number of employees: 1,700 (including partners)
- Website: smithandwilliamson.com

Smith & Williamson was a United Kingdom financial and professional services firm whose professional services business was later revived as S&W Group following a 2024 acquisition by Apax Partners, after the firm had previously become part of Tilney in 2019 and been rebranded as Evelyn Partners in 2022.

== History ==
Smith & Williamson was founded by David Johnstone Smith and Andrew Williamson in Glasgow in 1881.

By 1998, the firm had seven offices and claimed to be the 12th largest accounting firm in the UK based on fee income. It also acted as an investment manager and private banking house.

In October 2002, the audit business of Smith & Williamson was transferred into Nexia Audit Limited, taking the name of its international network.

Smith & Williamson has had a number of mergers. The first merger was with NCL (Securities) Limited, an investment manager, in 2002. Its second merger was with Solomon Hare, a private accounting firm in the UK, in 2005.

Nexia Audit Limited was renamed Nexia Smith & Williamson Audit Limited in 2006.

In 2018 Smith & Williamson merged with LHM Casey McGrath in Dublin. In September 2020, the company announced it had completed its merger with the Tilney group.

In February 2022 the merged firm Tilney Smith & Williamson, owned by private equity funds Permira and Warburg Pincus, was re-branded as Evelyn Partners. Nexia Smith & Williamson Audit Limited was renamed CLA Evelyn Partners Limited.

In May 2022, the firm announced the acquisition of two Scotland based financial adviser and asset management companies, Capital Risk Management and MP2 financial. The acquisition was processed with the aim of expanding the organisation’s reach in the UK.

In 2024, the professional services business of Evelyn Partners was acquired by Apax Partners LLP and subsequently rebranded as S&W Group, reviving the Smith & Williamson name the following year.

== Locations ==
Smith & Williamson had twelve offices in the United Kingdom and Ireland: Bristol, Birmingham, Cheltenham, Guildford, Salisbury and Southampton, England; Belfast and Dublin (City and Sandyford), Ireland; Jersey; and Glasgow, Scotland, with the headquarter office in London, England. In Belfast the firm operated under the name Cunningham Coates.

== International network ==
Smith & Williamson's international network was originally called S&W International. In 1998, Smith & Williamson became a member of Nexia International following Neville Russell's merger with Mazars and departure from Nexia International, leaving it without a UK firm. On becoming a member of Nexia, Smith & Williamson revoked their membership of S&W International.

In 2007, Nexia merged with SC International, the international network of Saffery Champness, to become the ninth largest provider of audit and accounting services.

In July 2022, CLA Evelyn Partners ceased to be a member of Nexia International and became a member of CLA Global.

== Panama Papers ==
The company's activities came under scrutiny in 2016, when it was revealed that its employees had managed the Smith & Williamson Blairmore Global Equity Fund since 1997. This fund was founded by David Cameron's (prime minister of the UK from 2010 to 2016) late father Ian. Earlier in the year, HM Revenue & Customs won a court case against Smith & Williamson, over the treatment of "goodwill payments" made by the firm to a portfolio manager and some team members.
