= Boasso Global =

American trucking and transport company

- Type: Private
- Industry: Transportation and logistics
- Headquarters: Tampa, Florida, U.S.
- Area served: United States
- Key people: Chris Synek (CEO)
- Number of employees: 3,500
- Website: www.boassoglobal.com

Boasso Global, is an American ISO tank services provider based in Tampa, Florida. In October 2022, Apax Partners sold Boasso Global to KKR.

== History ==
Formerly known as MTL, Inc. the company was founded in 1984 and had its name changed to Quality Distribution, Inc. in 1999. By 2012 the company was managing a fleet of approximately 2,800 independently owned and operated tractors and 5,300 trailers, as well as affiliate and company owned terminals; it had about 850 employees and a market capitalization of about $250 million.

== Expansion ==
The company expanded through acquisition into a number of areas in 2012, including transporting oil and wastewater for energy companies. These acquisitions initially underperformed expectations, but a December 2013 article in Barron's noted that QD's core business of chemical transportation remained a market-share leader. Earlier in 2013, Apollo Global Management planned to divest its 17% stake in the company with a public offering.

As of August 28, 2015, Quality no longer trades on the NASDAQ under the symbol QLTY. In 2015, Apax Partners acquired Quality for $800 million.

In 2023, Boasso Global and Quala, as well as their subsidiaries, combined to form Depot Connect International.

== Business structure ==
Intermodal is operated by Boasso America Corporation (“Boasso”) which includes ISO tank container transportation, depot services, tank cleaning, heating, testing, maintenance, and storage services. Energy Logistics is operated by QC Energy Resources, Inc. and QC Environmental Services, Inc. (collectively “QCER”) provide logistics and transportation services of crude oil, fresh water and production fluids to unconventional oil and gas (“UCO&G”) markets.

== Acquisitions ==
As of 2022, Quality distribution had acquired the following subsidiaries:

- American Transinsurance Group. Inc. (Delaware)
- ATG Reinsurance Ltd. (Turks & Caicos Island)
- Chemical Leaman Corporation (Pennsylvania)
- EnviroPower, Inc. (Delaware)
- Fleet Transport Company, Inc. (Delaware)
- Levy Transport Ltd. / Levy Transport, LTEE
- Mexico Investments, Inc. (Florida)
- MTL De Mexico S.A. de c.v. (Mexico)
- MTL Investments, Inc. (Canada)
- MTL of Nevada (Nevada)
- Power Purchasing, Inc. (Delaware)
- QD Capital Corporation (Delaware)
- QSI Services, Inc. (Delaware)
- Quala Systems, Inc. (Delaware)
- Quality Carriers, Inc. (Illinois)
- Quality Distribution, LLC (Delaware)
- Transplastics, Inc. (Delaware)
