= Tilney Ltd. =

Financial services firm in the UK

Tilney Investment Management Services Limited
- Company type: Limited
- Industry: Financial services
- Founded: 1836; 190 years ago
- Headquarters: Chesterfield Gardens, London, England
- Area served: United Kingdom
- Key people: Chris Woodhouse; (Chief executive officer); Lee Dooley; (Chief communications officer); Donald Reid; (Chief operations officer); Permira
- Products: Investment Management; Financial Planning; Investment Advisory; Wealth Management
- Number of employees: 1,000 (2017)
- Subsidiaries: Bestinvest
- Website: www.tilney.co.uk%20www.tilney.co.uk

Tilney was a financial planning and investment firm in the United Kingdom. It acquired financial advisors, Smith & Williamson, in 2019 and the enlarged firm was rebranded as Evelyn Partners in 2022.

== History ==
The firm was established as a firm of stockbrokers by Thomas Tilney in 1836.

Permira agreed to buy Tilney from Deutsche Bank, in February 2014, with the ambition of creating a wealth manager with £9 billion of assets. After completion of the deal in May 2014 Bestinvest and Tilney combined to create Tilney Bestinvest.

Tilney acquired Smith & Williamson with backing from Warburg Pincus in 2019. and the combined company was renamed Tilney Smith & Williamson in 2020.

In February 2022 the merged company Tilney Smith & Williamson, owned by private equity funds Permira and Warburg Pincus, was re-branded as Evelyn Partners.
