= Cole Haan =

American footwear brand

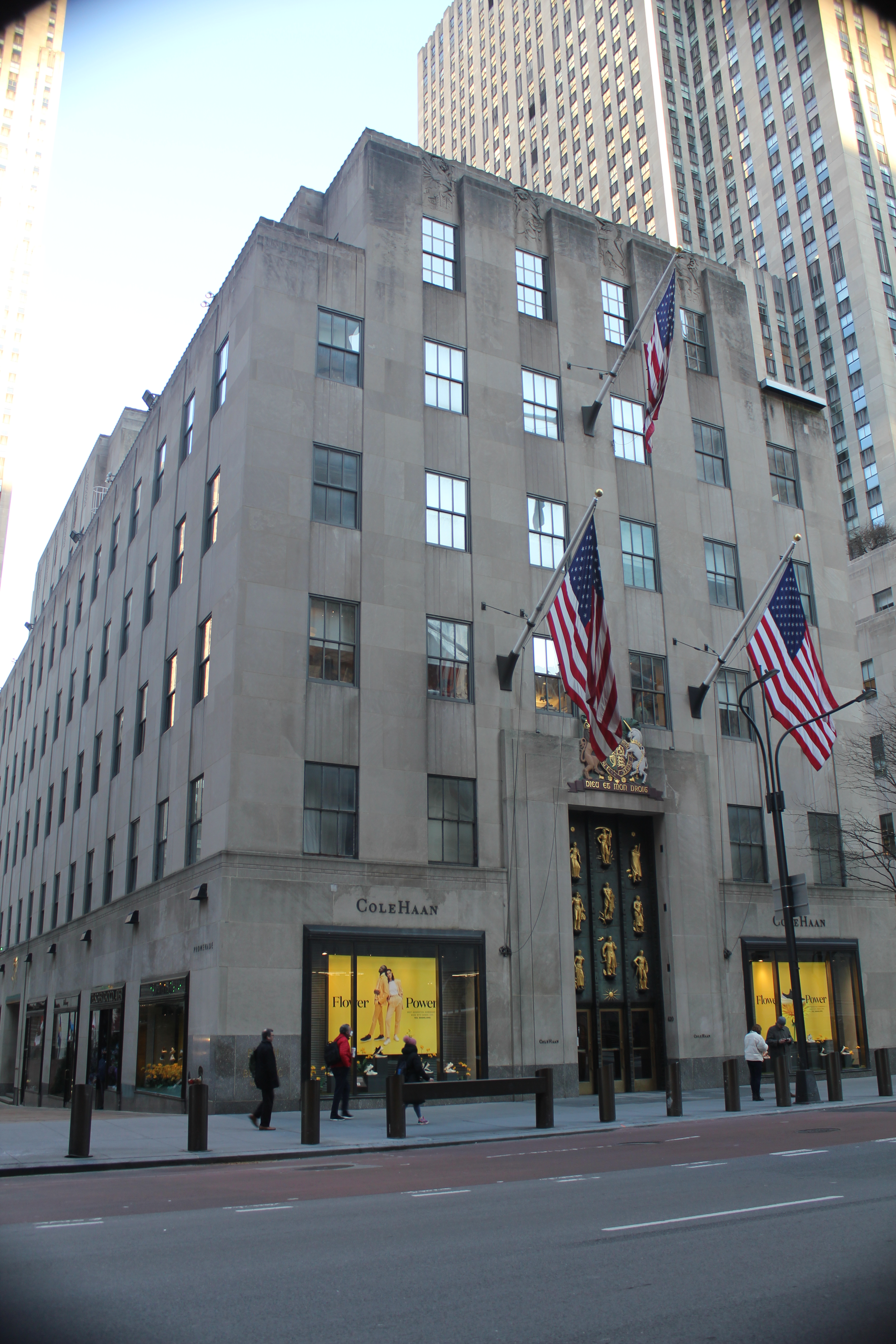
- Cole Haan Rockefeller Center, the brand’s global flagship, in 2022
- Type: Subsidiary
- Industry: Footwear
- Founded: 1928; 98 years ago Chicago, Illinois, U.S.
- Founders: Trafton Cole; Eddie Haan
- Headquarters: New York City, U.S. Greenland, New Hampshire, U.S.
- Number of locations: 321
- Area served: Worldwide
- Key people: Jack Boys (CEO); David Maddocks (President); Scott Patt (CCO)
- Products: Shoes, socks, bags, backpacks, belts, wallets, sunglasses, hats, gloves, scarves
- Parent: Nike, Inc. (1988–2012); Apax Partners (2012–present)
- Website: colehaan.com

Cole Haan is an American brand specializing in footwear and accessories for men and women. Established in 1928 in Chicago, Illinois, the company has evolved from a men's footwear label to a global brand offering a range of products. As of 2023, Cole Haan operates over 500 stores worldwide and maintains dual headquarters in New York City and Greenland, New Hampshire.

== History ==
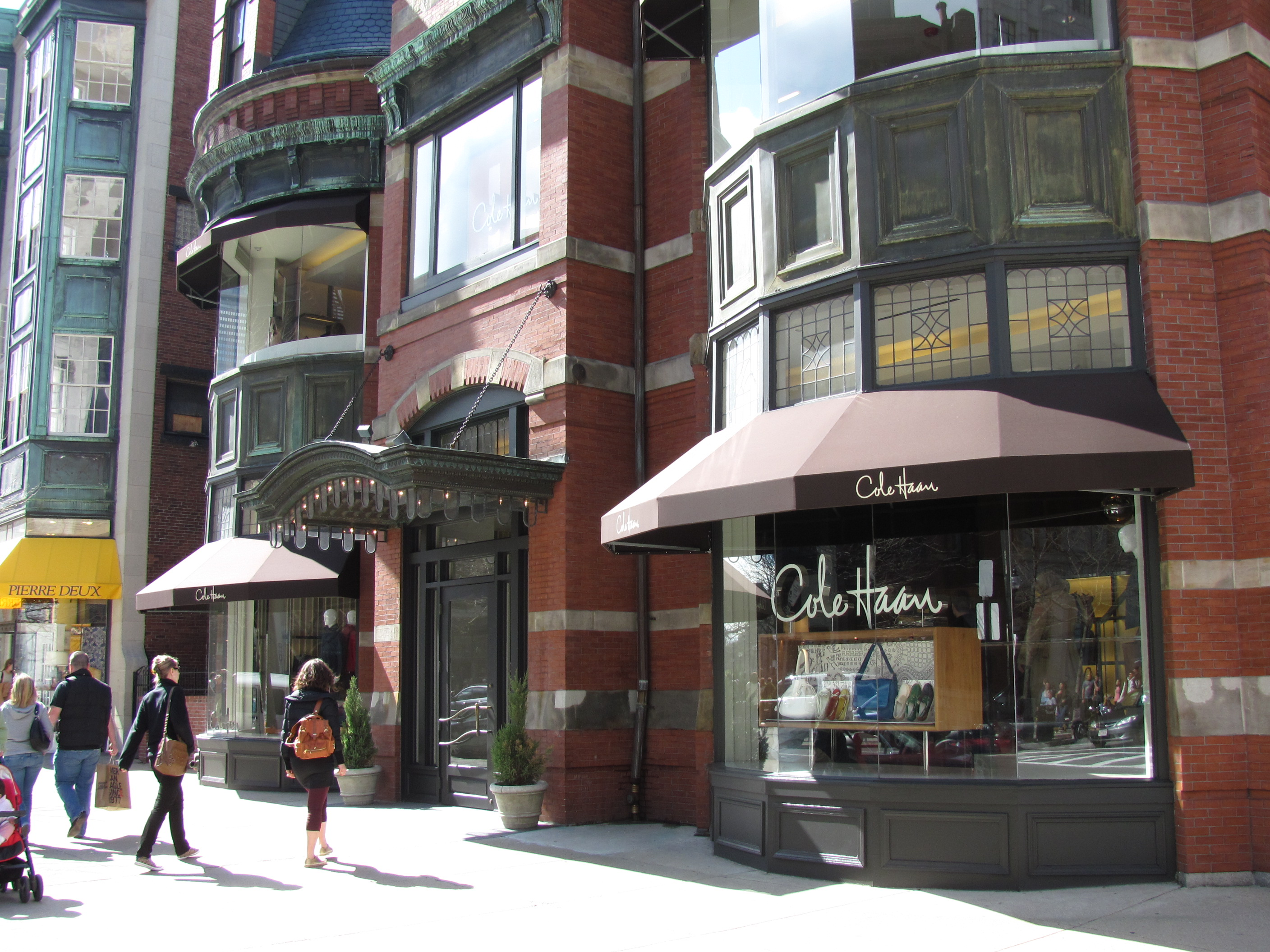
Cole Haan store on Newbury Street in Boston, pictured in 2011

The company's origins can be traced to the 1930 liquidation of Selz, Schwab & Company, a Chicago shoe manufacturer founded in the nineteenth century. As part of the liquidation, the company's largest Chicago factory was turned over to five former executives: C. Trafton Cole, William R. Rood, Edward Haan, Murdock McGregor, and Charles A. Simpson. The five organized a new company, Cole, Rood, Haan & McGregor, to continue the manufacture of men's footwear at the former Selz-Schwab factory.

By 1947, the firm was operating under the name Cole, Rood & Haan. That year, as Cole, Rood & Haan was liquidating its business, the J. P. Smith Shoe Company announced that it would manufacture men's shoes under the brand names used by Cole, Rood & Haan and service the company's former accounts. Trafton Cole and other personnel from Cole, Rood & Haan were appointed to supervise manufacturing of shoes branded under the name of the liquidated firm, while Edward Haan and Arthur Larson were appointed sales representatives for the former company's branded lines.

In 1958, J. P. Smith Shoe Company was acquired by the E. E. Taylor Corporation, and production associated with the firm was transferred to E. E. Taylor facilities in Maine.

Cole Haan was sold to a group of partners headed by George Denney in 1975. These executives built upon the foundation established by Cole and Haan over the following decade, transforming the label into one of the leading U.S. footwear brands. They launched a retail division in 1982, which comprised 40-plus stores worldwide and cumulative annual sales of nearly $70 million by 1996.

Nike, Inc. purchased Cole Haan in 1988. During Nike's ownership tenure, Cole Haan produced a number of experimental designs and achieved critical acclaim. In 2004, creative director Gordon Thompson III received the Accessory Designer of the Year from the Accessories Council. Nike announced on May 31, 2012, that it was divesting Cole Haan and Umbro to focus on the Nike brand and other complementary brands.

Cole Haan was bought by private equity firm Apax Partners Worldwide LLP for $570 million on November 16, 2012. Since then the brand has its headquarters in Greenland, New Hampshire, and its design center in New York City. Jack A. Boys is its current CEO.

The Cole Haan Maine headquarters relocated from Yarmouth to Scarborough in summer 2011. In October 2013 it was announced that the headquarters would relocate to Greenland, New Hampshire. The company made plans for an initial public offering in 2021, but withdrew those plans after economic upheaval caused by the COVID-19 pandemic.

Today Cole Haan offers a wide range of products, including men's and women's dress and casual footwear, belts, hosiery, handbags, gloves, scarves, hats, outerwear, and sunglasses.

== Retail stores ==
Cole Haan has over 300 stores with numerous locations in the Americas, Asia, and the Middle East. Cole Haan has one store in South Africa, and other than one location in Istanbul, does not have any other locations in Europe, nor any in Australia and New Zealand. Cole Haan sells its products worldwide through its own website and websites operated by international distribution partners.

Cole Haan products are also sold at retailers such as Nordstrom, Shoe Carnival, Zappos, Macy's, Lord & Taylor, Neiman Marcus, Hudson's Bay Company and other department stores and independent stores in the United States, as well as through its own outlet stores found in outlet malls throughout the country.

== Sustainability ==
On February 25, 2008, the company announced it would discontinue using real animal fur in its products for business and sustainability reasons.

== Collaborations ==
Cole Haan has collaborated with a range of designers, artists, and brands to release limited-edition collections. Notable collaborations include:

- Hiroshi Fujiwara / fragment design: In 2024, Cole Haan partnered with Japanese designer Hiroshi Fujiwara and his label fragment design to release a limited-edition footwear collection featuring minimalist updates to classic loafers.
- Byrdie Golf Social Wear: In 2023, Cole Haan and Byrdie Golf Social Wear collaborated on a capsule golf collection tailored for women, blending performance with retro-inspired aesthetics.
- Sophia Chang: Illustrator Sophia Chang partnered with Cole Haan in 2023 on a colorful footwear and accessories collection highlighting her vibrant design motifs.
- PHANTACi: Taiwanese streetwear brand PHANTACi worked with Cole Haan in 2023 to reinterpret classic silhouettes with neon accents.
- Russ Pope: Artist Russ Pope collaborated with Cole Haan to customize the Grand Ambition Backpack with cityscape illustrations in 2023.
- emmi: Cole Haan and Japanese brand emmi created a sustainable Generation ZERØGRAND II sneaker in 2022.
- Staple Pigeon: Cole Haan and Jeff Staple released an urban outdoor-themed ZERØGRAND collection in 2022.
- Pendleton Woolen Mills: A winter 2022 collaboration included footwear and bags using Pendleton's heritage textiles, inspired by Acadia National Park.
- Keith Haring Foundation: Cole Haan applied Haring's signature pop art to shoes and accessories in a 2022 collection.
- atmos: A streetwear-inspired collaboration in 2022 featured new versions of the ØriginalGrand Longwing Oxford.
- Hasan Minhaj: In 2020, the comedian co-designed footwear reflecting his Indian-American background.
- Slack Technologies: A workplace-themed 2020 collab yielded four shoe designs blending tech and professional culture.
- Rodarte: In 2019, Cole Haan and Rodarte released a Grand Ambition capsule with feminine fashion detailing.
- Todd Snyder: A 2015 collection featured modern updates to classic men’s styles like wingtips and loafers.
- Mountain Hardwear: Cole Haan's outerwear line with Mountain Hardwear debuted in 2015, fusing technical materials with urban style.
- Jen Brill and Olivia Kim: The duo co-designed a summer 2013 footwear line drawing on nostalgic inspirations.
- Dree Hemingway: In 2014, Hemingway collaborated on a collection of handbags and casual footwear.
- Dover Street Market Ginza: A 2013 collaboration introduced premium LunarGrand styles in Kudu suede.
- Elliott Erwitt: The brand featured Erwitt's photography in a campaign and book signing event during their "Born in 1928" initiative.
