= S&W Group =

Professional services company

- Company type: Limited Company
- Industry: Professional services
- Founded: 2025
- Headquarters: London, United Kingdom
- Area served: United Kingdom; Republic of Ireland
- Website: swgroup.com

S&W Group is a professional services firm with operations in the United Kingdom and the Republic of Ireland. The firm has around 1,800 employees and 120 partners across 15 offices. Its headquarters is located on Gresham Street in London.

== History ==
It was launched as a new business in 2025 following the acquisition of Evelyn Partners professional services division by the private equity firm Apax Partners. The formation of S&W marked a continuation of professional services previously offered under the Smith & Williamson name, a firm originally founded in 1881. In 2025, S&W Group expanded through the acquisition of Beechwood Partners in Dublin, MC2 Accountants in Cork, and Fredward in London. MC2 Accountants had previously acquired Parfrey Murphy. In the same year, the firm became one of the fastest-growing accountancy and advisory firms in the United Kingdom.

== Operations ==
S&W provides professional services to private clients, families, entrepreneurs, businesses, and charities. Its service offerings include accounting, audit and assurance, tax advisory, transaction advisory, and regulatory consulting. The firm also delivers business outsourcing, restructuring and recovery, and forensic accounting.
