= Topps =

American company

The Topps Company, Inc.
- Type: Private (1938–1984); Subsidiary (1984–present)
- Industry: Collectibles
- Founded: 1938; 88 years ago in Brooklyn, New York, U.S.
- Fate: Acquired by Forstmann Little & Co. in 1984, then other owners
- Headquarters: New York City, U.S.
- Key people: Michael Eisner (Chairman); Mike Mahan (CEO)
- Products: Trading cards (1938–present); Chewing gum and candy (1938–2012)
- Brands: List: Allen & Ginter (2006–present); Bowman (1956–present); Bazooka (1947–2022); Baby Bottle Pop (1998–2022); Juicy Drop Pop (2003–2022); Push Pop (1986–2022); Ring Pop (1977–2022)
- Revenue: $91.6 Million (fiscal 2006)
- Net income: $101 Million (fiscal 2017)
- Number of employees: 422
- Parent: Forstmann Little & Co. (1984–2007); The Tornante Company & Madison Dearborn Partners (2007–22); Fanatics, Inc. (2022–present)
- Website: topps.com

The Topps Company, Inc. is an American company that manufactures trading cards and other collectables. Formerly based in New York City, Topps is best known as a producer of baseball and other sports- and non-sports-themed trading cards. Topps also produces cards under the brand names Allen & Ginter and Bowman.

In the 2010s, Topps was the only baseball card manufacturer with a license with Major League Baseball. After Topps lost the license to Fanatics, Inc. in 2022, Fanatics acquired Topps.

Topps also commercialised confectionery items such as chewing gum, lollipop, and candy bars until 2012, when the company sold its business to Fanatics.

== Company history ==
=== Beginnings and consolidation ===
Topps was founded in 1938 by four brothers, Abram, Ira, Philip and Joseph Shorin. The roots of Topps can be traced to American Leaf. Ira, Philip, and Joseph decided to focus on a new product while taking advantage of the company's existing distribution channels. To do this, they relaunched the company as Topps, with the name meant to indicate that it would be "tops" in its field. The chosen field was the manufacture of chewing gum.

At the time, chewing gum was still a relative novelty sold in individual pieces. Topps' most successful early product was Bazooka bubble gum, which was packaged with a small comic on the wrapper. Starting in 1950, the company decided to try increasing gum sales by packaging them together with trading cards featuring the Western film character Hopalong Cassidy (William Boyd); at the time Boyd, as one of the biggest stars of early television, was featured in newspaper articles and on magazine covers, along with a significant amount of "Hoppy" merchandising. When Topps next introduced baseball cards as a product, the cards immediately became its primary emphasis.

The "father of the modern baseball card" was Sy Berger. In the autumn of 1951, Berger, then a 28-year-old veteran of World War II, designed the 1952 Topps baseball card set with Woody Gelman on the kitchen table of his apartment on Alabama Avenue in Brooklyn. The card design included a player's name, photo, facsimile autograph, team name and logo on the front; and the player's height, weight, bats, throws, birthplace, birthday, stats and a short biography on the back. The basic design is still in use today. Berger would work for Topps for 50 years (1947–1997) and serve as a consultant for another five, becoming a well-known figure on the baseball scene, and the face of Topps to Major League baseball players, whom he signed up annually and paid in merchandise, like refrigerators and carpeting.

The Shorins, in recognition of his negotiation abilities, sent Sy to London in 1964 to negotiate the rights for Topps to produce Beatles trading cards. They also tried hockey. Arriving without an appointment, Sy succeeded by speaking in Yiddish to Brian Epstein, the Beatles' manager.

Berger hired a garbage scow to remove leftover boxes of 1952 baseball cards that had been stored in their warehouse and rode with them as a tugboat pulled them off of the Jersey Shore. The cards were then unceremoniously dumped into the Atlantic Ocean. They included Mickey Mantle's first Topps card, the most valuable card of the modern era. No one at the time, of course, knew the collectors' value that the cards would one day attain. On August 28, 2022, the Mickey Mantle baseball card (Topps; #311; SGC MT 9.5) was sold for $12.600 million.

=== Incorporation ===
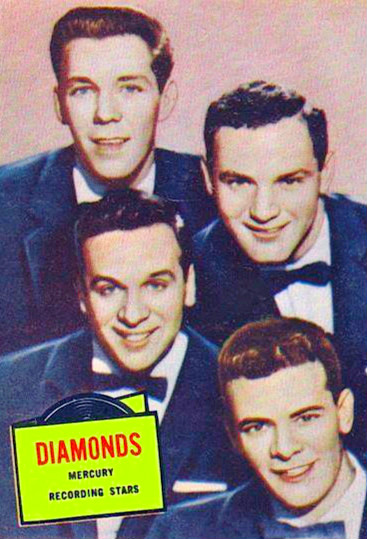
A 1957 Topps trading card featuring The Diamonds from a series showcasing film, TV and recording stars

The company began its existence as Topps Chewing Gum, Inc., a partnership between the four Shorin brothers. It later incorporated under New York law in 1947. The entire company originally operated at the Bush Terminal in Brooklyn, but production facilities were moved to a plant in Duryea, Pennsylvania, in 1965 (the Duryea plant closed in 1997). Corporate offices remained at 254 36th Street in Brooklyn, a location in the waterfront district by the Gowanus Expressway. In 1994, the headquarters relocated to One Whitehall Street in lower Manhattan.

After being privately held for several decades, Topps offered stock to the public for the first time in 1972 with the assistance of investment banking firm White, Weld & Co. The company returned to private ownership when it was acquired in a leveraged buyout led by Forstmann, Little & Company in 1984. The new ownership group again made Topps into a publicly traded company in 1987, now renamed to The Topps Company, Inc. In this incarnation, the company was reincorporated under Delaware General Corporation Law for legal reasons, but company headquarters remained in New York. Management was left in the hands of the Shorin family throughout all of these maneuverings.

On October 12, 2007, Topps was acquired by Michael Eisner's The Tornante Company and Madison Dearborn Partners. Under Eisner's direction, Topps began to expand into the entertainment and media business with plans for a Bazooka Joe film. Former TV executive Staci Weiss was hired as Topps' head of entertainment to develop projects based on Topps properties, including Garbage Pail Kids, Wacky Packages, Dinosaurs Attack!, Mech Warrior and Attax.

=== Topps Digital ===
In 2012, Topps began creating digital sports cards, starting with the Topps Bunt baseball mobile app. After releasing Bunt in 2013 and finding success with it, they expanded their sports card market with other mobile apps, including the Kick soccer mobile app in August 2014, the Huddle football mobile app in April 2016, and the Skate hockey mobile app in 2017.

Along with sports cards, Topps also expanded its marketplace for collectors of digital goods to include non-sports cards on mobile devices. In March 2015, they released their Star Wars Card Trader app, and in May 2016 they released a Walking Dead trading card app. Following the success of their assortment of digital trading card apps, they once again expanded their marketplace for digital collectors a few years later, releasing a Marvel trading card app in the spring of 2019 and their Disney trading card app in November of that same year.

In March 2020, Topps announced a collaboration with WAX.io to make their cards tradable on the blockchain. As of December 2020, Topps has only made Garbage Pail Kids cards available to traders via blockchain but they have announced Alien Quadrilogy collectibles will be coming soon.

In April 2021, Topps announced plans to go public via a merger with Mudrick Capital Acquisition Corporation II, a publicly traded special purpose acquisition company (SPAC). Michael Eisner's firm The Tornante Company planned to roll its stake into the new company while Mudrick Capital would lead an additional investment of $250 million. The deal valued Topps at $1.3 billion. However, reports surfaced within six months of their initial plans that Mudrick Capital Management had backed out of the investment deal.

In August 2021, it was reported that Fanatics, Inc. acquired future exclusive licenses with Major League Baseball and the Major League Baseball Players Association to produce baseball cards. In January 2022, Fanatics announced they had acquired Topps for US$500 million.

== Topps Europe Ltd. ==
=== Purchase of Merlin ===
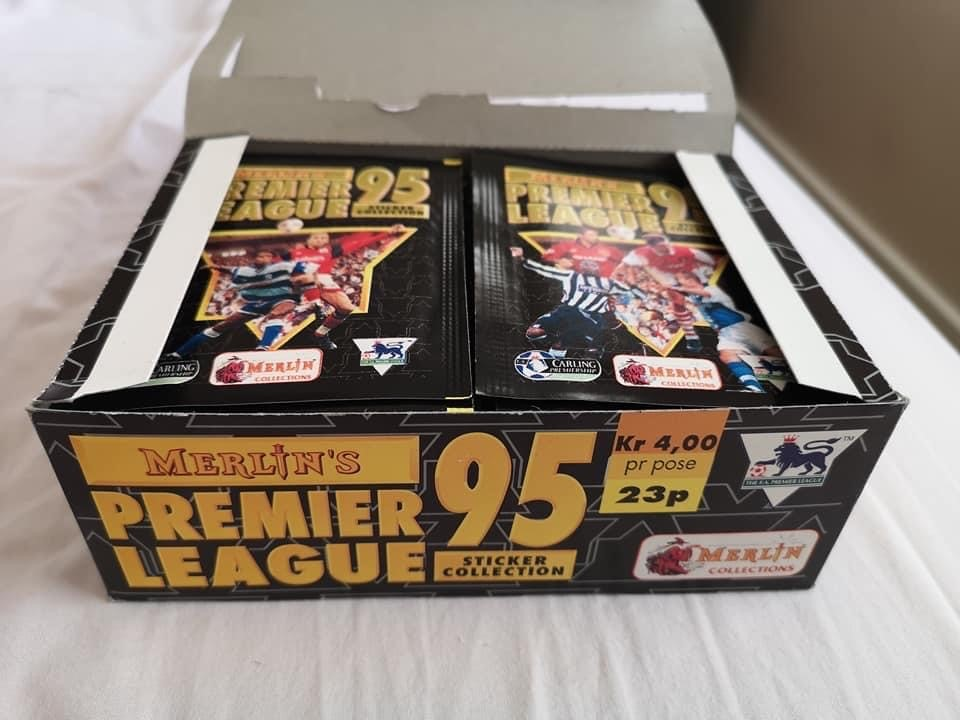
A box of Merlin Premier League 95 sticker packs as they would appear for sale in a supermarket or a newsagent's shop

Topps has a European division, which is based in Milton Keynes, UK. From this office products are launched across Europe, including Spain, France, Germany, Norway, and Italy. This division also co-ordinates products launches across the many other international markets including the Far East, Australia, and South Africa.

In 1994 Merlin Publishing acquired the Premier League license allowing the company to exclusively publish the only official Premier League sticker and album collection in the UK. The initial success of the Premier League stickers and album collection was so great that it took even Merlin by surprise, with reprint after reprint being produced.

In 1995, Topps completed its takeover of Merlin Publishing for $46.2 million. Merlin's official company name changed to Topps Europe Ltd. in 1997, but its products still carried the Merlin brand until 2008 as it was easily recognized by consumers.

Topps Europe Ltd. continues to produce a wide and varied range of sports and entertainment collectibles across Europe. Its range of products now includes stickers, albums, cards and binders, magazines, stationery, and temporary tattoos.

=== Topps Europe Ltd. products ===
Topps Europe Ltd. has continued to launch products across Europe. Some of the most prominent licenses have included WWE, Pokémon, Doctor Who, High School Musical, and SpongeBob SquarePants.

Topps' Merlin-branded Premier League sticker albums have been popular since their launch in 1994, and in 2007 they acquired the Premier League rights for trading cards. Previously, the trading card rights were held by Magic Box International who produced the Shoot Out cards from the 2003–2004 season to the 2006–2007 season. Match Attax, the official Premier League trading card game, was the biggest selling boys’ collectible in the UK three years running. Being sold across the globe in a number of countries, the collection also holds the title of the biggest selling sports collectible in the world. It is estimated that around 1.5 million children collect it in the UK alone.

Following on from the acquisition of Premier League trading cards rights, in the spring of 2008 Topps acquired the exclusive rights to the DFL (Deutsche Fussball Liga) GmbH for trading cards and stickers until the Bundesliga Season of 2010–2011. Bundesliga Match Attax was launched in January 2009 and is now available in over 40,000 stockists. The collection was the first of its kind in Germany and became one of the biggest-selling collections in the entire country. Currently, a lot more football cards are sold.

As of February 2016 Topps Match Attax dominated the secondary UK trading card trading market, occupying two out of the top three spots on the Sticker Points website as the "most popular soccer collection" list.

In January 2023, Topps released both physical and digital trading cards for their latest partner, the 24 Hours of Le Mans motorsport event. The release is set for February 2023 and will feature art work from original race posters from 1923 to the present day.

== Topps baseball cards ==
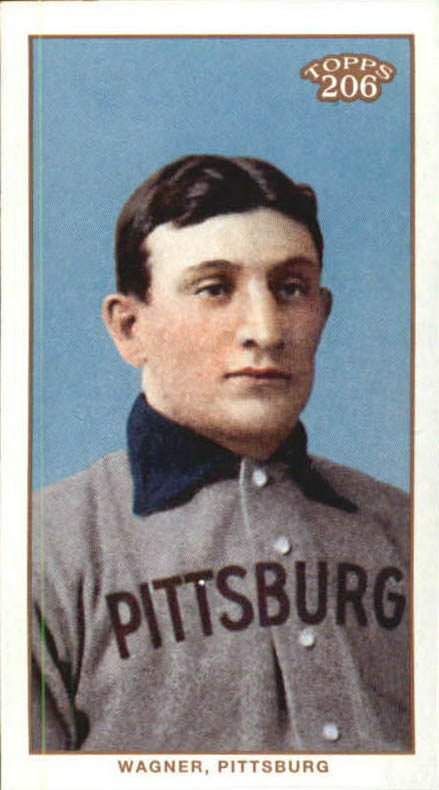
Topps reissue of the iconic T206 Honus Wagner card launched in 2002

In 1951, Topps produced its first baseball cards in two different sets known today as Red Backs and Blue Backs. Each set contained 52 cards, like a deck of playing cards, and in fact the cards could be used to play a game that would simulate the events of a baseball game. Also like playing cards, the cards had rounded corners and were blank on one side, which was colored either red or blue (hence the names given to these sets). The other side featured the portrait of a player within a baseball diamond in the center, and in opposite corners a picture of a baseball together with the event for that card, such as "fly out" or "single."

Topps changed its approach in 1952, this time creating a much larger (407 total) set of baseball cards and packaging them with its signature product, bubble gum. The company also decided that its playing card model was too small (2 inches by 2 5/8 inches) and changed the dimensions to 2 5/8 inches by 3 3/4 inches with square corners. The cards now had a color portrait on one side, with statistical and biographical information on the other. This set became a landmark in the baseball card industry, and today the company considers this its first true baseball card set. Many of the oil paintings for the sets were rendered by artist Gerry Dvorak, who also worked as an animator for Famous Studios. In 1957, Topps shrank the dimensions of its cards slightly, to 2 1/2 inches by 3 1/2 inches, setting a standard that remains the basic format for most sports cards produced in the United States to this day. It was at this time Topps began to use color photographs in their set.

== Topps American football cards ==
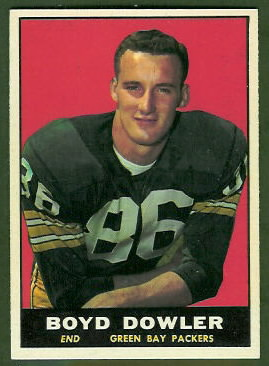
Boyd Dowler in a 1961 Topps American football card

In addition to baseball, Topps also produced cards for American football in 1951, which are known as the Magic set. For football cards Bowman dominated the field, and Topps did not try again until 1955, when it released an All-American set with a mix of active players and retired stars. After buying out Bowman, Topps took over the market in 1956.

Since then, Topps sold football cards every season until 2016. However, the emergence of the American Football League (AFL) in 1960 to compete with the established National Football League also allowed Topps' competitors, beginning with Fleer, to make inroads. Fleer produced a set for the AFL in 1960, sets for both leagues for a year, and then began focusing on the AFL again. Philadelphia Gum secured the NFL rights for 1964, forcing Topps to go for the AFL and leaving Fleer with no product in either baseball or football.

Although more competitive for a time, the football card market was never as lucrative as the market for baseball cards, so the other companies did not fight as hard over it. After the AFL–NFL merger was agreed to, Topps became the only major football card manufacturer beginning in 1968. In spite of the lack of competition, or perhaps to preempt it, Topps also created two sets of cards for the short-lived United States Football League in the 1980s. Many NFL legends had their first ever cards produced in the USFL sets. These players include Steve Young, Jim Kelly, and Reggie White. This resulted in a controversy when these players debuted in the NFL. Many wondered if the USFL cards should be considered rookie cards because the league did not exist anymore. The situation continued until growth in the sports card market generally prompted two new companies, Pro Set and Score, to start making football cards in 1989.

Throughout the 1970s until 1982, Topps did not have the rights to reproduce the actual team logos on the helmets and uniforms of the players; curiously, these could be found on the Fleer sets of the same era, but Fleer could not name specific player names (likely an issue of Topps holding the NFL Players Association license and Fleer holding the license from the league). As a result, helmet logos for these teams were airbrushed out on a routine basis.

After the 2015 football season, Panini was awarded an exclusive license by the NFL for producing football cards. 2016 was the first year Topps did not produce football cards since 1955.

On April 1, 2026, Topps was granted the exclusive license by the NFL for producing football cards.

== Trading cards for other sports ==
Topps also makes trading cards for other major North American professional sports. Its next venture was into ice hockey, with a 1954 set featuring players from the four National Hockey League franchises located in the U.S. at the time: the Boston Bruins, the Chicago Blackhawks, the Detroit Red Wings and the New York Rangers.

In 1958, the O-Pee-Chee Company of London, Ontario, Canada, entered into an agreement with Topps to produce NHL cards (the 1957–1958 series) and Canadian football cards (the 1958 series). O-Pee-Chee then started printing its own hockey and football cards in 1961. Similarly, Topps struck agreements with Amalgamated and British Confectionery in the United Kingdom and Scanlen's in Australia.

In 1967, with the major expansion of six new NHL teams to the United States, Topps produced a new hockey card set that paralleled the 1966–1967 O-Pee-Chee hockey design (the basic TV design was, in fact, used for the 1966 Topps American football card series). Starting in 1968–1969, Topps started printing an annual Topps hockey set that was similar to the annual O-Pee-Chee hockey set. The Topps and O-Pee-Chee hockey sets shared a similar design from 1968–1969 to 1981–1982 and from 1984–1985 to 1991–1992.

Topps first sold trading cards for basketball in 1957, but stopped after one season. The company started producing basketball cards again in 1969 and continued until 1982, but then abandoned the market for another 10 years, missing out on printing the prized rookie cards of Michael Jordan and other National Basketball Association stars of the mid- to late 1980s. Topps finally returned to basketball cards in 1992, the rookie year of Shaquille O'Neal.

In the United Kingdom, where football stickers have been popular over roughly the same period of time as trading cards, Topps acquired the Amalgamated and British Confectionery firm in 1974, bringing its production methods and card style to Britain. Topps also makes cards for the Scottish Professional Football League. Under its Merlin brand, it has the license to produce stickers for the Premier League and the national team. Its main competition is the Italian company Panini. Until 2019, Topps made Topps Premier League stickers and the Match Attax trading card game, and since 2015 it has produced stickers and trading cards for the UEFA Champions League. Topps also makes hockey and wrestling trading cards.

In 2008, Topps gained the rights to production of WWE trading cards. The first variation of cards were aptly titled Slam Attax, a play on words of the previously popular football trading card game Match Attax (also made by Topps). The first set was released in late 2008 in the UK, and it was then later released in the United States in mid-2009. This later proved to be a pattern for subsequent Slam Attax sets and variations, with the UK getting an earlier release than the U.S.. After failing to take off, Topps ceased production of Slam Attax cards in the U.S. after only two sets while continuing the line both in the UK and in Continental Europe where, in contrast, the brand had become more popular. It remains one of the longest-running Topps brands in the UK to this day.

Topps UEFA Champions League cards in a vending machine in Argentina, 2026

In 2008, Topps and Zuffa signed an exclusive agreement to produce mixed martial arts trading cards. Among the included cards were current and former athletes from the UFC.

In May 2026, it was revealed that Fanatics, Inc. (the owner of Topps) had signed an exclusive collective licensing deal with FIFA to become the exclusive licensor of collectible cards, stickers, and card games for the World Cup and other FIFA events. All collectibles will be produced under the Topps brand, owned by Fanatics. The agreement will be effective from 2031 onward. The deal severed the long-term partnership between FIFA and Panini, which had been the licensee for over 50 years.

== Non-sports products ==
Originally, Topps was purely a gum company, and its first product was simply named "Topps Gum". Other gum and candy products followed. In imitation of Bowman and other competitors, Topps eventually began producing humor products unrelated to sports. This included stickers, posters (Wanted Posters, Travel Posters), media tie-ins (Rowan & Martin's Laugh-In), book covers (Batty Book Covers) and toys (Flying Things), plus offbeat packaging (Garbage Can-dy). More recently, the company published comic books and games.

=== Candy and confectionery items ===
Launched in 1947, Bazooka bubble gum remains the longest-lived Topps product line to this day, small pieces of bubble gum in patriotic red, white, and blue packaging. Bazooka was introduced as a bar of bubble gum that sold for five cents. Unlike the bubble gum that was sold with baseball cards, it was of better quality and capable of selling on its own merit. In 1953, Topps began selling smaller penny pieces with the Bazooka Joe comic strip on the wrapper as an added attraction.

Even though baseball cards became the company's primary focus during this period, Topps still developed a variety of candy items. For quite a few years, the company stuck within familiar confines, and virtually all of these products involved chewing gum in some way. Sales declined significantly in the 1970s, however, when this relatively hard bubble gum was challenged by Bubble Yum, a new, softer type of bubble gum from Life Savers.

Later, Topps added more candy items without either chewing gum or bubble gum. One particular focus has been lollipops, such as Ring Pop, introduced in 1977. However, Topps noted that increasing public attention to childhood nutrition undercut its candy sales. Under pressure by shareholders, the company considered selling off its confectionery business in 2005, but was unable to find a buyer to meet its price and decided to cut management expenses instead.

Other Topps candy brands included Push Pop (introduced in 1986), Baby Bottle Pop (1998) and Juicy Drop Pops (2003). Discontinued products include Vertigo lollipops (2006–08), which consisted of a creamy lollipop with a chocolate half, and Wazoo candy bar (2009).

When the Topps name was sold, along with the trading card business and its entertainment properties, to Fanatics in 2022, the confectionary business was spun-off as "Bazooka Candy Brands" (named carried since 2009), which remains owned by the previous owners.

=== Non-sports trading cards ===
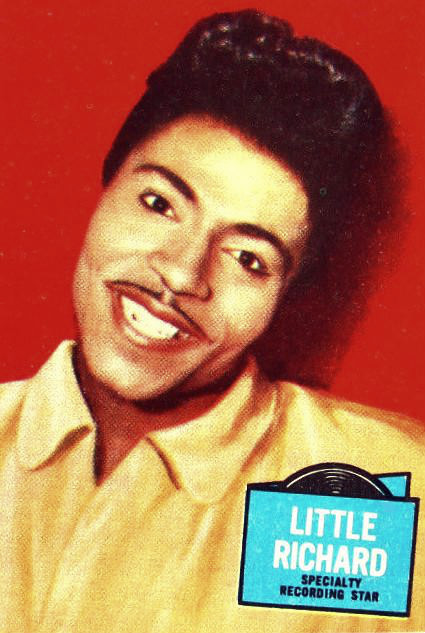
A 1957 Topps trading card featuring Little Richard from a series showcasing film, TV and recording stars

As its sports products relied more on photography, Topps redirected its artistic efforts toward non-sports trading cards based on themes inspired by popular culture. For example, the Space Race prompted a set of Space Cards in 1958. Topps has continued to create collectible cards and stickers on a variety of subjects, often targeting the same adolescent male audience as its baseball cards. In particular, these have covered movies, television series, and other cultural phenomena ranging from the Beatles to the life story of John F. Kennedy. The many Star Wars card series have done well, with a few exceptions. Future screenwriter Gary Gerani (Pumpkinhead) joined the company in 1972 and became the editor / writer of almost all of Topps' film and TV series products, most notably the aforementioned many Star Wars card series, while also creating and helming original card properties such as 1988's Dinosaurs Attack!.

Many Topps artists came from the world of comics and continued to work in that field as well. The shift from sports to other topics better suited the creative instincts of the artists and coincided with turmoil in the comic book industry over regulation by the Comics Code Authority. Beginning at Topps when he was a teenager, Art Spiegelman was the company's main staff cartoonist for more than 20 years. Other staffers in Topps' Product Development Department at various times included Larry Riley, Mark Newgarden, Bhob Stewart and Rick Varesi. Topps' creative directors of Product Development, Woody Gelman and Len Brown, gave freelance assignments to leading comic book illustrators such as Jack Davis, Wally Wood and Bob Powell. Spiegelman, Gelman and Brown also hired freelance artists from the underground comix movement, including Bill Griffith, Kim Deitch and Robert Crumb. Jay Lynch did extensive cartooning for Topps over several decades.

Drawing on their previous work, these artists were adept at things like mixing humor and horror, as with the You'll Die Laughing cards which first appeared in 1959. The 1962 Mars Attacks cards, sketched by Wood and Powell and painted by Norman Saunders, later inspired the 1996 Tim Burton film Mars Attacks!. A tie-in arrangement with the film had earlier led to the release of a 1994 expanded version of the cards, a then-new 100-card series titled Mars Attacks Archives, which reprinted the 55 original cards and also featured 45 new cards from several different artists, including Norm Saunders' daughter, Zina Saunders.

Among Topps' most notable achievements in the area of satire and parody have been Wacky Packages, a parody of various household consumer products, and Garbage Pail Kids, a parody of the Cabbage Patch Kids dolls. Another popular series was Civil War News, also with Norman Saunders' artwork.

Earlier, particularly in the early and mid-1960s, Topps thrived with several successful series of parody and satire cards for a variety of occasions, usually featuring artists who also worked at Mad magazine. There were several insult valentine card series, a 1959 series of insult epigram cards titled Wacky Plaks, several series of well-known product advertising parody cards, a 1980 series of cards based on, and inspired by, the "mad car driver cartoons" of artist Ed "Big Daddy" Roth titled Weird Wheels, and a sticker card series of fanciful bizarre "rejected aliens" from other planets, among other semi-subversive outrageous over-the-top concepts designed for the semi-rebellious adolescent boomer market.

Although baseball cards have been Topps' most consistently profitable item, certain fads have occasionally produced spikes in popularity for non-sports items. In 1973-1974, Wacky Packs even outsold baseball cards at the height of their popularity, becoming the first product to do so since the company's early days as purely a gum and candy maker. Pokémon cards would accomplish the same feat for a few years starting in 1999. In the absence of new fads to capitalize on, Topps has come under pressure from stock analysts, since its sports card business is more stable and has less growth potential.

In 2015, Topps started to expand its non-sports category by adding more TV series and science fiction with its brand-new Star Wars line (expanding into its own Topps virtual card mobile app that was similar to Topps Bunt), as well as Doctor Who, with regular autographs as well as vintage cut autographs, screen-worn relics, and more.

=== The Disney Channel ===
Topps worked together with the Disney Channel to create trading cards based on both the High School Musical film trilogy (High School Musical, High School Musical 2 and High School Musical 3: Senior Year) and the TV series Hannah Montana.

=== Comic books ===
Drawing on its established connections with artists, in 1993, Topps created a division of the company to publish comic books. Known as Topps Comics, its early efforts included several concepts from the then-retired comics industry legend Jack Kirby, known collectively as the "Kirbyverse". Topps Comics particularly specialized in licensed titles with tie-ins to films or TV series, though it also published a few original series. Its longest-running and best-selling title was The X-Files, based on the Fox TV series.

These comic books featured former Marvel Comics editor Jim Salicrup as its editor-in-chief. Aside from The X-Files, some of its more famous titles included Lone Ranger and Tonto by Timothy Truman, Xena: Warrior Princess, Mars Attacks, and Zorro, which introduced the famous comics character Lady Rawhide. With sales stagnating, the company decided to pull out of the comics business in 1998.

=== Games ===
The Topps Pokémon cards were purely for entertainment, pleasure and collecting, but a new niche of collectible card games was also developing during this period (The Pokémon Trading Card Game was produced simultaneously by Wizards of the Coast). Topps made its first foray into the world of games in July 2003 by acquiring the game company WizKids for $29.4 million in cash, thus acquiring ownership of the rights to the well-known gaming universes of BattleTech and Shadowrun. By inventing yet another niche, the constructible strategy game Pirates of the Spanish Main, this unit managed to reach profitability. Topps shut down its operation of WizKids in November 2008 due to the economic downturn. The brand was acquired by NECA in September 2009.

== Controversy ==
In March 2021, Topps was criticized for its depiction of the South Korean boy band BTS in its Grammy-themed collection, which was seen as racist and violent. In response to public backlash, the company apologized and the cards were removed from its production lineup.

== Awards ==
=== Major League Baseball ===
- Topps All-Star Rookie Team

=== Minor League Baseball ===
- Topps Minor League Player of the Year Award – also known as the J. G. Taylor Spink Award (Note: The MiLB J. G. Taylor Spink Award should not be confused with the identically-named J. G. Taylor Spink Award that is the highest award given by the Baseball Writers' Association of America (BBWAA), annually to a baseball writer.)
- George M. Trautman Awards – Also in conjunction with Minor League Baseball, Topps presents the George M. Trautman Awards to the Topps Player of the Year in each of sixteen domestic minor leagues.
- Topps Short Season-A/Rookie All-Star Team

== See also ==
- Topps baseball card products
- History of Topps baseball cards
- Merlin Publishing
- Allen & Ginter
- Bowman
- Fanatics, Inc.

== Bibliography ==
- Bowman Gum, Inc. v. Topps Chewing Gum, Inc., 103 F.Supp. 944 (E.D.N.Y. 1952).
- Boyd, Brendan C. & Fred C. Harris (1973). The Great American Baseball Card Flipping, Trading and Bubble Gum Book. Boston: Little, Brown and Company. ISBN 0-316-10429-9.
- Caple, Jim. "A card fan's dream come true". ESPN.com Page 2, July 25, 2006.
- Fleer Corp. v. Topps Chewing Gum, Inc., 501 F.Supp. 485 (E.D. Pa. 1980).
- Fleer Corp. v. Topps Chewing Gum, Inc., 658 F.2d 139 (3d Cir. 1981).
- Haelan Laboratories, Inc. v. Topps Chewing Gum, Inc., 202 F.2d 866 (2d Cir. 1953).
- Haelan Laboratories, Inc. v. Topps Chewing Gum Co., 112 F.Supp. 904 (E.D.N.Y. 1953).
- Schwartz, Ben. "Culture Jamming for the Swingset Set". Chicago Reader, June 25, 2004.
- Schwarz, Alan (2004). The Numbers Game: Baseball's Lifelong Fascination with Statistics. New York: St. Martin's Press. ISBN 0-312-32222-4.
- Slocum, Frank & Red Foley (1990). Topps Baseball Cards: The complete picture collection, a 40 year history. New York: Warner Books.
- Smith, Aaron. "Mickey Mantle or Martha?" CNN/Money, March 24, 2005.
- Thompson, Wright. "Investors gear up for takeover". ESPN.com Page 2, July 27, 2006.
