= Mobilization (disambiguation) =

Mobilization is the act of assembling and readying military troops and supplies for war.

Mobilization can also refer to:

- Community mobilization, an attempt to bring both human and non-human resources together to undertake developmental activities
- Joint mobilization, a type of passive movement of a skeletal joint
- Mass mobilization (also known as social or popular mobilization), a social science theory related to mobilizing the population in mass meetings, parades, and other gatherings
- Resource mobilization, a social science theory related to mass mobilization in the social movements context
- Mobilization: The International Quarterly Review of Social Movement Research, an academic journal

== See also ==
- Mobilization Device, an award associated with the U.S. Armed Forces Reserve Medal
- National Mobilization Committee to End the War in Vietnam
