= DemocracyInAction =

American non-profit organization

DemocracyInAction.org Activism Services
- Formation: 2005
- Headquarters: Washington, D.C.
- Location: United States
- Website: DemocracyInAction.org

DemocracyInAction, or DIA, was a Washington, D.C.–based 501(c)(3) public charity organization focused on being a nonprofit technology provider.

DemocracyInAction was the creator and primary maintainer of an open source software application. The original version is referred to as Tomato but was not named until after the release of the current version. This release is named Salsa. It is written in Java. Incorporated as a 501(c)(3), DemocracyInAction also operates as an application service provider hosting a suite of electronic advocacy tools for other nonprofits. Over 300 organizations use the DemocracyInAction / Salsa toolset.
