= Baby Bottle Pop =

Brand of confectionery

Baby Bottle Pop logo

Baby Bottle Pop is a brand of lollipops introduced by manufacturer Topps in 1998 in a baby bottle shape. The lollipops come in a variety of fruit flavors including strawberry, cherry, blue raspberry, watermelon, bubblegum, green apple, and grape. The candy currently consists of three varieties: "Original" (introduced 1998), "2D Max" (introduced 2001), and "Crunch" (introduced in 2010). In 2008, the jingle (originally introduced in 1998) was reworked and promoted by the Jonas Brothers.

Baby Bottle Pops are eaten by taking a piece of lollipop in the form of a baby bottle tip and then dipping it into powdered sugar. The powdered sugar is at the base of a shaped plastic bottle.

The brand is now owned by The Bazooka Companies.

== Advertising and promotion ==
=== Commercial jingle ===
Commercials for the snack featured a song with the slogan you can lick it, shake it, and dunk it. In one instance, it was performed by the Jonas Brothers.

=== Online game ===
In May 2008, Baby Bottle Pops introduced an online game which went along with the physical product. The Baby Bottle candy featured rolled up paper with a code, which you would input on the game. The game was similar to Club Penguin, it included character customization, socialization, decorating your home area, and minigames.
