= Mobilize (company) =

American political technology platform

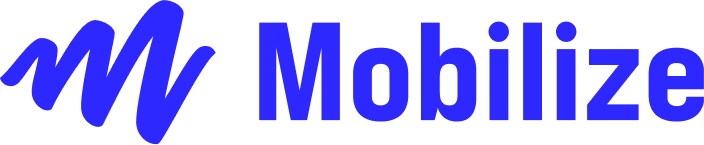
- Type: Private
- Founded: May 2017; 9 years ago in Washington, D.C., U.S.
- Founders: Allen Kramer; Alfred Johnson
- Parent: Apax Partners
- Website: mobilize.us

Mobilize is an American technology platform and network that allows volunteers to sign up for events such as rallies, virtual meetings, canvassing, phone banking, and get out the vote. Founded in May 2017 by Allen Kramer and Alfred Johnson, the platform is used by Democratic Party candidates, progressive organizations, and non-profits to recruit and mobilize volunteers.

In November 2020, Mobilize was acquired by EveryAction, the parent company of NGP VAN. In November 2021 Apax Partners acquired NGP VAN in a $2 billion deal.

== History ==
=== 2017-2020 ===
Mobilize was founded as MobilizeAmerica in May 2017 by Allen Kramer and Alfred Johnson. Kramer previously worked for Bain & Company and on the Hillary Clinton 2016 presidential campaign. Johnson previously worked in the financial technology sector after working on the Barack Obama 2008 presidential campaign and joining the Obama administration. Until the company's acquisition in 2021, Kramer served as president of the company, and Johnson as CEO.

MobilizeAmerica allows volunteers to sign up for political campaign events such as canvassing, door-knocking, phone banking and get out the vote. It started with seed funding from Higher Ground Labs, a progressive technology accelerator based in Chicago and chaired by Ron Klain. Kramer and Johnson recruited a team of engineers and organizers to create the platform, and first launched with Democratic Party campaigns in the 2017 Virginia House of Delegates elections. Ten out of the eleven candidates for the Virginia House of Delegates who used the platform in 2017 won their elections with the Democratic Party gaining a new majority in the legislature.

The platform was next used by the successful campaign to elect Conor Lamb from Pennsylvania to the House of Representatives in a special election, and Mobilize quickly spread after that. Several political groups also began using the platform including MoveOn, Swing Left and Indivisible. In the 2018 election cycle, Democratic Party candidates from all levels of government used the Mobilize platform to manage volunteer work. By November 2018, Mobilize was serving 515 campaigns and more than 640 organizations, including the Democratic Congressional Campaign Committee.

=== 2020-2021 ===
In January 2020, Mobilize raised $3.75 million in a Series A funding led by Higher Ground Labs. Among other investors were Lowercase Capital and Reid Hoffman. Mobilize was used by 20 candidates in the 2020 Democratic Party presidential primaries, including Joe Biden's campaign which continued to use the platform through the general election.

With the spread of the COVID-19 pandemic, by March 2020, almost all volunteer campaign work switched to virtual events over Zoom with volunteers signing up through Mobilize which was updated to accommodate the shift to virtual events. According to the company's data, thousands of new volunteers registered on Mobilize each day. In August 2020, Mobilize also created GetOutTheCount.com as a central resource hub for volunteers assisting with the 2020 United States census and to amplify efforts to increase participation in the count during a difficult census being conducted amidst the COVID-19 pandemic.

=== 2021-present ===
In the last four days of the 2020 United States elections, 551,000 volunteers had worked more than 1 million shifts through the Mobilize platform, and the platform had been used by a total of more than 4 million volunteers. In late November 2020, Mobilize was acquired by EveryAction, the parent company of NGP VAN. The price of the acquisition was not disclosed and the platform continued to operate as a unit led by Johnson. Johnson left the company in 2021 to join the Biden administration as deputy chief of staff of the Department of the Treasury.

In November 2021, Apax Partners acquired Mobilize's parent, NGP VAN, in a $2 billion deal. Apax created a subsidiary, Bonterra, to oversee the company.

In the summer of 2024, technicians from Kamala Harris worked to fix technical problems with the site, which were highlighted in the 2024 Presidential election.

The company hosted maps for the April 5, 2025, Hands Off protests.
