= Bazooka (chewing gum) =

American brand of bubble gum

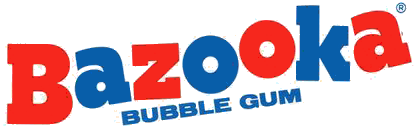

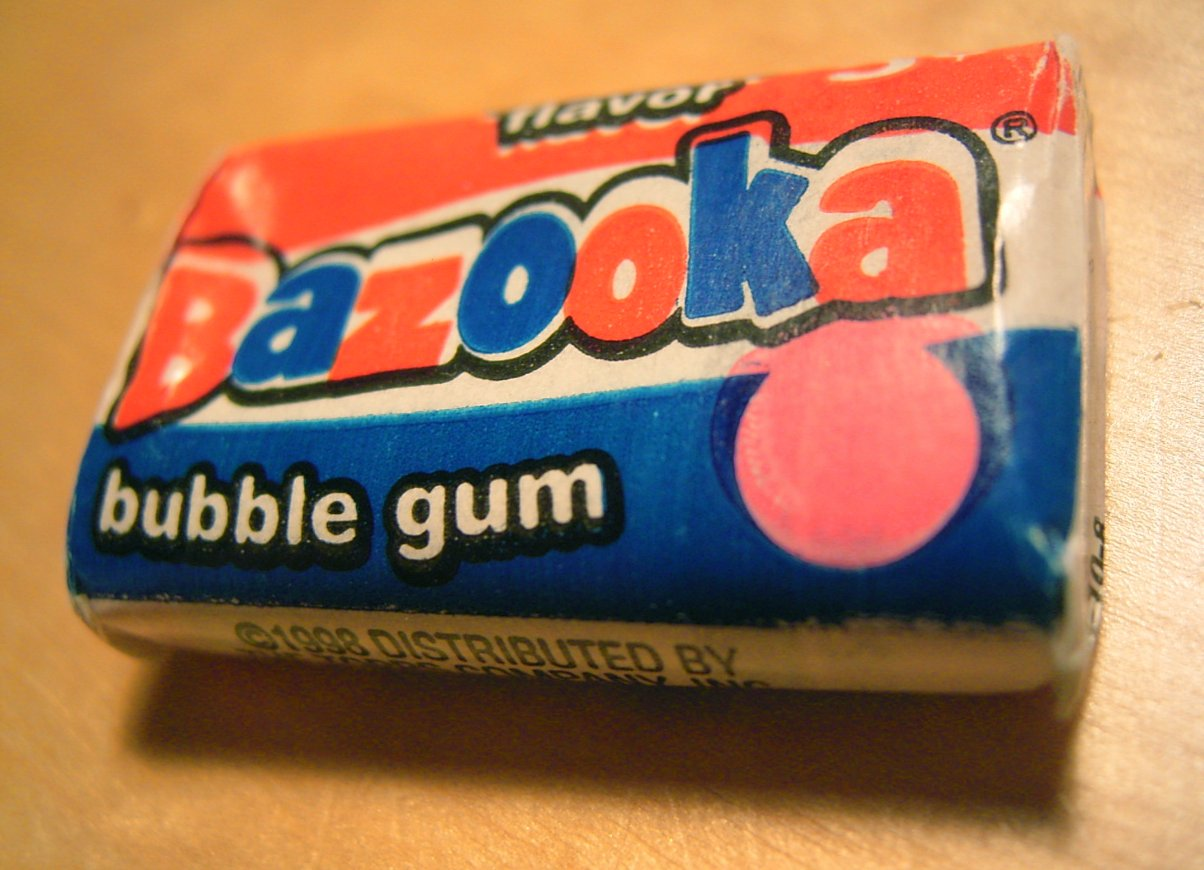
- Bazooka bubble gum package
- Product type: Bubble gum
- Current owner: Apax Partners (2023–present)
- Country: United States
- Introduced: 1947; 79 years ago
- Previous owners: Topps (1947–2022); Fanatics, Inc. (2022–2023)
- Website: bazookajoe.com

Bazooka is an American brand of bubble gum that was introduced in 1947. It is a product of "Bazooka Candy Brands" (BCB), which was a division of The Topps Co. until the latter's acquisition by Fanatics, Inc. in 2022.

In October 2023, it was announced that Apax Partners had completed the acquisition of BCB and its product portfolio.

== History ==
Bazooka bubble gum was launched shortly after World War II in 1947 in the U.S. by the Topps Company of Brooklyn, New York. The gum was most likely named after the rocket-propelled weapon developed by the U.S. army during the war, which itself was named after a musical instrument.

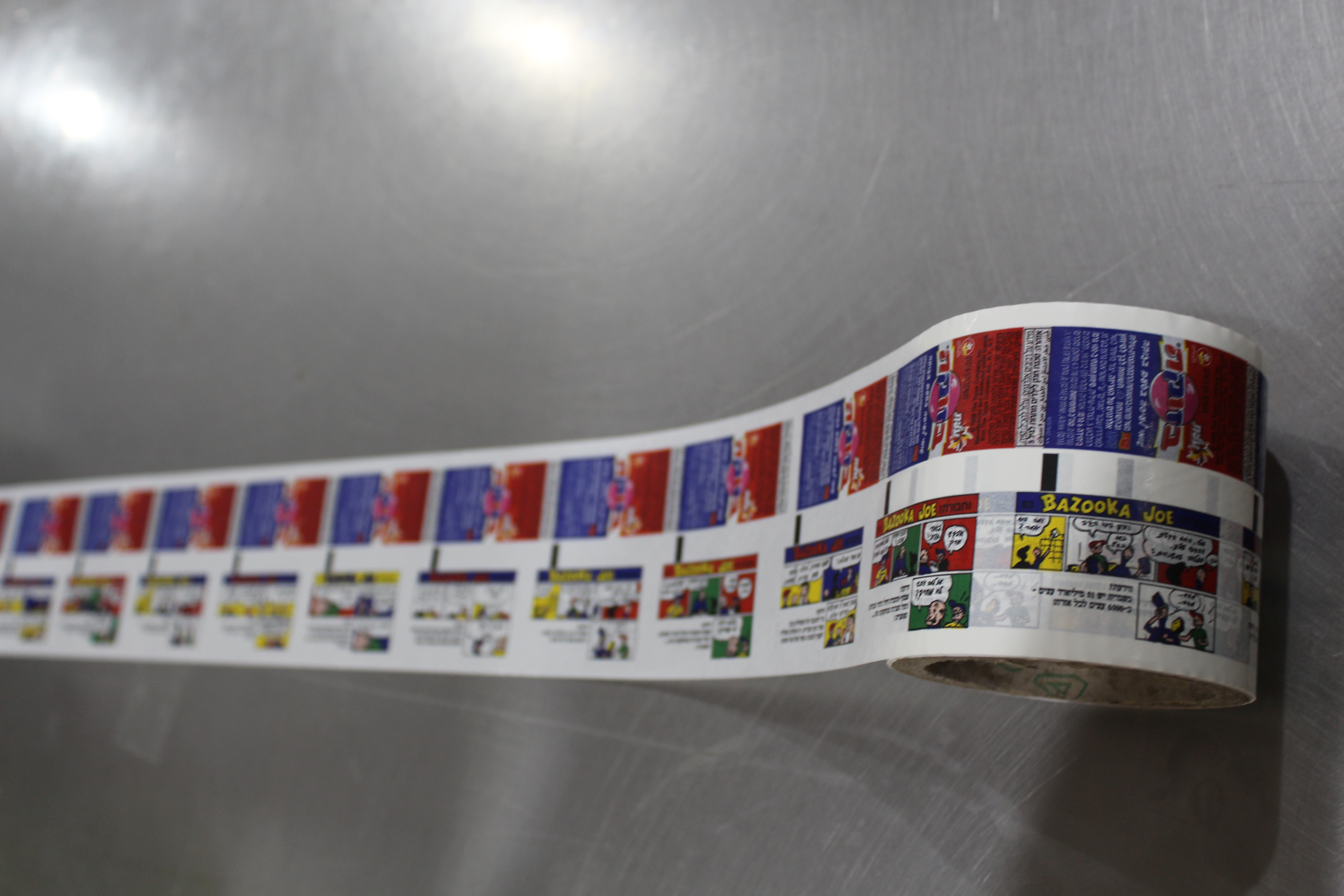
Production of Bazooka packaging and comic strips at the Elite factory in the Nazareth Illit Israel

The bubble gum was packaged in a red, white, and blue color scheme and originally sold for 1 penny. Beginning in 1953, Topps changed the packaging to include small comic strips with the gum, featuring the character "Bazooka Joe". There are over 1,535 different "Bazooka Joe" comic-strip wrappers to collect. Also on the comic strip is an offer for a premium and a fortune. Older Bazooka Joe comic strips were larger in size and are no longer available.

In addition to "Original", Topps eventually included the flavors "Strawberry Shake," "Cherry Berry," "Watermelon Whirl," and "Grape Rage." Bazooka bubble gum also makes sugar-free flavors such as "Original" and a "Flavor Blasts" variety, claimed to have a longer-lasting, more intense taste. Bazooka bubble gum comes in two different sizes.

Bazooka bubble gum has been sold in many countries starting in the 1960s, often with Bazooka Joe comic strips translated to the local language. Bazooka gum is sold in Canada with cartoons in both English and French, depending upon the city. In Israel, it is manufactured under license by Elite in the company's factory in Nof HaGalil; the cartoons are written in Hebrew.

In Spain, Bazooka bubble gum was sold under the name "Chicle Bazoka" (with only one "o") starting in the mid-1960s and featuring the Bazooka Joe strips. One of the publicity slogans was "Chicle bazoka, siempre en la boca" (Bazooka gum, always in the mouth). Rhymes were a popular publicity trick at the time.

In 2012, Bazooka Candy Brands announced they would no longer include comics, instead using brain-teasing puzzle wrappers in an attempt to modernize the brand.

In Argentina, sales continue with the comics in Spanish using the name "Yo amo Bazooka" (I love Bazooka). Topps lists all information about all of its Bazooka Candy brands through its website Candymania.

In April 2019, the company announced the launch of the Bazooka Throwback pack.

In December 2022, the brand celebrated its 75th anniversary and released a 16-minute documentary film titled Bazooka Bubble Gum Turns 75.

== See also ==
- Bazooka Joe
