= Apax Partners =

British private equity firm

Apax Partners LLP
- Type: Private
- Industry: Private equity Venture capital
- Founded: 1972; 54 years ago
- Headquarters: London, U.K.
- Key people: Andrew Sillitoe (co-CEO); Mitch Truwit (co-CEO)
- Brands: List: Bazooka; Baby Bottle Pop; Juicy Drop Pop; Push Pop; Ring Pop
- Services: Investments; Private equity funds Leveraged buyouts Growth capital
- AUM: US$77 billion
- Number of employees: 350+
- Subsidiaries: List: Cole Haan (2013–); Ole Smoky Distillery (2022–)
- Website: apax.com

Apax Partners LLP is a British private equity firm, headquartered in London, England. The company also operates out of six other offices in New York, Hong Kong, Mumbai, Tel Aviv, Munich and Shanghai. As of March 2024, the firm had raised and advised funds of approximately US$77 billion.

Apax Partners is one of the oldest and largest private equity firms operating on an international basis.

Apax invests across three sectors: technology, internet/consumer and services. It looks for investments in a target Enterprise Value of $100–5,000 million.

Apax raises capital for its investment funds through institutional investors including corporate and public pension funds, university and college endowments, foundations and fund of funds.

== History ==
In 1972, Ronald Mourad Cohen and Maurice Tchénio founded the advisory firm Multinational Management Group (MMG) in London, Paris, and Chicago, marking the beginning of Apax Partners. In 1977, they formed a partnership with early venture capitalist Alan Patricof, who founded Patricof & Co in New York in 1969. The new firm would be known as Alan Patricof Associates (APA) and ultimately come to be known as Apax Partners (apax means "unique" in classical Greek).

Throughout the 1980s, the firm grew steadily raising capital under a series of separate funds.

In 1991, Apax Partners became the official name for all of its European operations however the U.S. business still operated under the Patricof & Co. name. By the mid-1990s Apax had become one of the larger private equity firms globally.

In 2001, Patricof & Co. adopted the Apax Partners branding and formalized its affiliation with its European business. In 2002, Apax Partners LLP was established.

In 2005, Apax announced it would acquire middle market leveraged buyout firm Saunders Karp & Megrue to augment its buyout business in the United States. In March 2006, Alan Patricof left Apax.

In 2006, Apax Partners in London and Apax Partners France in Paris became independent. Apax Partners France rebranded to Seven2 in 2023.

== Investments ==
=== Pre-2010 ===
- British Telecom restructured, and agreed to sell the Yell Group Yellow pages directory business to Apax and Lion Capital LLP for £2.14 billion ($3.5 billion), making it then the largest non-corporate LBO in European history. Yell bought US directories publisher McLeodUSA for about $600 million the following year, and floated on London's FTSE in 2003.
- Apax purchased a majority stake in Travelex (the world's largest foreign exchange company) for £1.06bn. In Q3 2005 Apax also announced plans to purchase Grupo Panrico, one of Spain's largest food companies and its largest bakery company.
- A partnership consisting of Apax, Saban Capital Group and Arkin Communications acquired the controlling interest (30%) in Israeli telecommunications company Bezeq in October 2005 for $923 million. The partnership sold its stake to Internet Gold – Golden Lines Ltd. subsidiary B Communications in April 2010 for $1.75 billion.
- Apax floated the satellite communications company Inmarsat on the London Stock Exchange in 2015.
- Apax purchased the Tommy Hilfiger Corporation for $1.6 billion, or $16.80 a share, all in cash. In May 2006, this deal was approved by the shareholders of Tommy Hilfiger.
- In June 2006, Apax acquired HIT Entertainment in a take-private transaction.
- On 21 August 2006 it was announced that Apax Partners and Bain Capital had joined the enlarged private equity consortium headed by KKR that has agreed to acquire an 80.1% stake in the Semiconductor Division of Royal Philips Electronics. The new company is called NXP Semiconductors.
- On 31 October 2006 it was announced that Apax Partners had acquired FTMSC (France Télécom Mobile Satellite Communications) which would later be rebranded under the Vizada name in June 2007. This was shortly followed by an announcement on 6 September 2007 explaining that Apax Partners had acquired Telenor Satellite Services which was to be merged into the Vizada brand.
- On 20 November 2006 Apax Partners Worldwide LLP won a tender to buy control of Tnuva. The bid values the privately held food and dairy group at $1.025 billion.
- In May 2007, Apax signed definitive agreements with funds advised by Apax Partners and OMERS Capital Partners under which such funds acquired the higher education, careers and library reference assets of Thomson Learning, and a consortium of funds advised by OMERS, and Apax acquired Nelson Canada, for a combined total value of approximately $7.75 billion in cash. The higher education, careers and library reference assets include such well-known brands and businesses as: Wadsworth, South-Western, Delmar Learning, Eddie Diamond, Gale, Heinle, Brooks/Cole, Course Technology and Nelson Canada. Nelson Canada is a leading provider of books and online resources for the educational market in Canada. The group will be majority-owned by OMERS. The name was changed to Cengage Learning, on 24 July 2007.
- In January 2008 Apax and Mivtach Shamir purchased the Tnuva company for $1.025 billion.
- In August 2008, Apax Partners completed acquisition of TriZetto Group.
- In August 2009, Apax Partners completed acquisition of Bankrate.

=== 2010–2014 ===
- In January 2010, Apax Partners acquired 76.8% of Israel-based Psagot Investment House for $570 million.
- In April 2010, Apax Partners announced acquisition of TIVIT.
- In May 2010, Apax Partners acquired a 70% stake in Sophos for $580 million.
- On 25 March 2011 Apax Partners announced that it had reached a definitive agreement to purchase Trader Corporation (“Trader”) from Yellow Media for a purchase price consideration of $745 million.
- On 23 December 2011 Apax Partners announced acquisition of the Swiss branch of Orange.
- In February 2012, Apax sold HiT Entertainment to Mattel for $680 million.
- On 11 June 2012 an Apax-led consortium announced acquisition of Paradigm Ltd.
- In September 2012, Apax Partners forms consortium with CEO Stephen Cretier for GardaWorld Security Services.
- In November 2012, Apax Partners agrees to acquire Cole Haan and completes acquisition 4 February 2013.
- On 21 January 2014 Apax bought out the remaining 50.1% share of Trader Media from the Guardian Media Group.
- On 9 October 2014 Apax announced that they will acquire Dutch software maker Exact. It closed the transaction in April 2015.
- On 8 December 2014 Apax announced that it had entered into a transaction agreement to acquire 100% of the shares of EVRY.

=== 2015–2019 ===
- In May 2015, Apax Partners agreed to purchase Quality Distribution, a Tampa, Florida–based chemical transport and logistics firm, for $800 million, including assumption of debt. The deal was completed in August 2015.
- In July 2015, Apax bought 100% of Spanish real estate web portal idealista.
- In December 2015, Apax Partners agreed to sell Rhiag-Inter Auto Parts Italia SpA to LKQ Corporation for $1.14 billion.
- On 19 July 2016 Apax Partners agrees to acquire Boats Group. Formerly Dominion Marine Media ("DMM"), a subsidiary of Landmark Media Enterprises.
- On 23 August 2017 funds advised by Apax Partners announced a definitive agreement to acquire ThoughtWorks, a global software development and digital transformation consulting company.
- In September 2017, Tom Chapman and Ruth Chapman sold a majority stake in Matchesfashion.com to private-equity funds managed by Apax Partners.
- In May 2018, Apax Partners purchased the network services provider Expereo from The Carlyle Group.
- In January 2019, Apax Partners invested US$200 million in Fractal Analytics.
- In May 2019, Apax Partners purchased New Zealand e-commerce company Trade Me for $1.7 billion.
- In July 2019, funds advised by Apax Partners acquired Baltic Classifieds Group, a business owning a portfolio of portals in Estonia, Latvia and Lithuania.

=== 2020–2024 ===
- In April 2020, Apax Partners finalized the purchase of Coalfire, a cybersecurity firm.
- In June 2020, Apax invested $100 million in Payfone, a software and data analytics firm, today known as Prove Identity and based in New York.
- In September 2020, Apax sold their majority stake in idealista, the Spanish real-estate web portal, to EQT AB, for a sum of EUR1.3 billion, achieving a quintuple return on its 2015 investment of EUR235 million.
- In Dec 2020, Azentio Software Private Limited, subsidiary of Apax Partners, buys global software products business of 3i Infotech for Rs. 1000 Cr
- In January 2021, Apax acquired PIB Group, a specialist insurance company, together with PIB's management team.
- In February 2021, Apax reinvested in idealista, acquiring a 17% stake in the web portal for EUR250 million.
- In February 2021, Apax acquired a majority stake in Herjavec Group, a global managed security services provider led by founder and CEO Robert Herjavec, who retained a significant stake.
- In March 2021, Apax Partners acquired Rodenstock, a German manufacturer of ophthalmic lenses and spectacle frames, for EUR1.5 billion.
- In March 2021, Apax also agreed to acquire Lutech, an IT service company in Italy, from One Equity Partners.
- In May 2021, Apax acquired Texas based, pet food company Nulo.
- In June 2021, Apax acquired Infogain, a Silicon Valley–based company in the digital transformation and software services sector, from the private equity firm ChrysCapital.
- In August 2021, Apax acquired EveryAction from Insight Partners and Social Solutions from Vista Equity Partners, combining them with CyberGrants, a company it agreed to acquire in June from Waud Capital Partners. Vista kept a minority stake in the combined company, which will have annual revenue of over $200 million.
- In September 2021, Apax joined with Warburg Pincus to acquire T-Mobile Netherlands Holding B.V., today known as Odido, in a transaction valuing the company at an enterprise value of EUR5.1 billion.
- In September 2021, Apax also acquired SavATree, a horticultural service provider, based in New York.
- In October 2021, Apax agreed to acquire the homeowner services group of American Water Works for $1.27 billion.
- In November 2021, UK satellite firm Inmarsat, partially owned by Apax, agreed to be acquired by Viasat for $7.3 billion.
- In December 2021, Apax sold Unilabs, a European medical diagnostics company acquired from Nordic Capital and Apax Partners France, today known as Seven2, in 2016, to A.P. Moller Holding, the owner of Maersk.
- In November 2021 Apax acquired NGP VAN for $2 billion. NGP VAN through Mobilize.us handled voter registration information for the Democratic Party. During the 2024 Presidential election, teams working for Kamala Harris fixed flaws in the system, and some questioned whether a private equity firm should be handling such data.
- In February 2022, Apax acquired a majority stake in Ole Smoky Distillery, a Gatlinburg, Tennessee–based spirits company.
- In February 2022, Apax also acquired a controlling stake in Alcumus, a risk management and compliance services firm based in Cardiff. The deal valued Alcumus at over £600 million.
- In June 2022, Apax acquired EcoOnline, an EHS and chemical management SaaS company for $401 million.
- In October 2022, Apax sold ISO tank services provider Boasso Global, formerly known as Quality Distribution, to KKR.
- In January 2023, Apax portfolio company EcoOnline merged with the software division of Alcumus.
- In May 2023, Apax agreed to acquire Blackstone Inc.'s minority stake in IBS Software, a software-as-a-service provider for travel and logistics companies, investing an estimated $450m, with IBS Software founder and executive chairman, Valayil Korath Mathews, retaining the majority stake.
- In July 2023, Apax agreed with Fremman Capital and other minor stakeholders, to acquire a co-controlling stake in Spain's Palex Medical.
- In August 2023, Apax entered into an agreement with The Tornante Company, former Disney CEO Michael Eisner's private investment firm, and Madison Dearborn Partners to acquire the Bazooka candy business for a sum of $700 million.
- In October 2023, Apax agreed to invest in GAN Integrity, a provider of cloud-based compliance management software, based in Copenhagen, Denmark.
- In November 2023, Apax, together with existing investors Frontier Growth, PeakSpan Capital, and Petvisor's management team, invested more than $100m in Petvisor, a veterinary and pet services software provider.
- In December 2023, Apax acquired the financial software companies OCS from Charme Capital Partners and Finwave from Lutech.
- In February 2024, Apax completed the acquisition of trend forecasting company WGSN from Ascential. In the same month, Apax acquired a majority stake in Integrated Environmental Solutions (IES), a Glasgow-based provider of software simulation tools and consulting services for the decarbonisation of buildings, communities and cities.
- In May 2024, Apax agreed to sell India based Healthium Medtech, a medical device company acquired from TPG Growth, CX Partners, and founding shareholders in April 2018, to KKR for a sum of $839 million.
- In July 2024, Genius Sports Limited announces that Funds advised by Apax Partners LLP have fully monetized their equity interest in Genius Sports and no longer holds any shares in the Company.
- In Nov 2024, Apax completes the transaction to take the consultancy company Thoughtworks (NASDAQ: TWKS) private, for a sum of $1.75 Billion.
- In December 2024, Apax and GTCR agreed to sell AssuredPartners NL to Arthur J. Gallagher & Co. in a $13.45 billion cash deal.

=== Since 2025 ===
- In January 2025, Apax agreed to sell their majority stake in Paycor HCM, a provider of human capital management software, to competitor Paychex, in a transaction valuing the company at an enterprise value of $4.1 billion.
- In March 2025, Apax completed the acquisition of Evelyn Partners professional services business. Following the transaction, first agreed in November 2024, the group was divided into Evelyn Partners, a wealth management company, and S&W Group, an accountancy and professional services firm.

== Investment funds ==
Fund	Vintage Year	Capital ($m)
Apax VIII	2013	$7,500
AMI Opportunities L.P.	2015	$500
Apax IX	2016	$9,000
Apax Digital Fund	2017	$1,000
Apax X	2020	$11,000
Apax Digital Fund II	2023	$1,750
Apax Global Impact	2023	$877
Apax XI	2024	$12,000

== Criticism ==
=== British United Shoe Machinery (2000) ===
The circumstances surrounding the demerger, transfer of assets and subsequent collapse of the British United Shoe Machinery in 2000 led to questions about Apax's behaviour being raised in Parliament by MPs of both main parties. After calls for an enquiry into the loss of hundreds of pensions were refused, Ros Altmann, the pensions expert and, as of 2015, UK Pensions minister described it "one of the worst cases ..I have seen ..the actions of the former owners – Apax have been immoral." The Member of Parliament Ashok Kumar said, "I think these people needed flogging ..these are greedy, selfish, capitalists who live on the backs of others."

=== Hellas Telecommunications (2015) ===
Following its sale of Wind Hellas in 2007, Apax and Hellas co-owner TPG were sued by former bondholders of the telecom company, who allege that Apax and TPG unjustifiably enriched themselves from Hellas and misrepresented the true state of its accounts. Apax has countered that some of these bondholders only began their dispute after passing up on the chance of selling prior to the bankruptcy of 2009, and that Apax sold the business in 2007 (almost three years before the bankruptcy) and so was not the legal owner of Hellas during the periods cited in some of the lawsuits. (In 2005 a New York judge awarded $56 million to some of these bondholders, made against Hellas Telecommunications Finance and Hellas Finance, rather than Apax or TPG). Other lawsuits related to Apax and TPG's ownership of Hellas are being heard in the United States. In December 2015 a separate legal action brought by the liquidators of Hellas Telecommunications was dismissed by a Luxembourg court. In February 2018 the liquidators abandoned their UK case against Apax and TPG after four days of trial.

== Notable persons ==
- Jonathan Kestenbaum, Baron Kestenbaum (born 1959), chief operating officer of investment trust RIT Capital Partners, and a Labour member of the House of Lords

== See also ==
- Scott Mead
