= Social Solutions =

Social Solutions Global (SSG)
- Industry: Computer software
- Founded: 2000
- Headquarters: Austin, Texas
- Products: ETO software, Apricot Essentials, Apricot
- Number of employees: 200+
- Website: socialsolutions.com

Social Solutions is a 200+ person software company with headquarters in Austin, Texas.

The company provides performance management software for human service organizations, including Harlem Children's Zone, the Annie E. Casey Foundation, the Administration on Aging, the United States Department of Housing and Urban Development, and organizations in the cities of Boston and Hartford, Connecticut. Social Solutions' software products, called Efforts to Outcomes (ETO) and Apricot, help organizations measure the progress that they make with participants and families.

== History ==
Social Solutions was founded in 2000 by Steve Butz, a former human service professional with the Living Classrooms Foundation. Butz and his co-founders, Adrian Bordone and Vince Griffith, were frustrated by their inability to accurately track progress when working with troubled youths, and decided that there must be a better way for human and social service organizations to affect participants, families, and communities.

In 2014 Social Solutions was acquired by Vista Equity Partners, and in 2015 Social Solutions acquired Community TechKnowledge (makers of Apricot software) based out of Austin, Texas,
