= Ghorbani =

Ghorbani (Persian: قربانی) is an Iranian surname. Notable people with the surname include:

- Ali Ghorbani (footballer, born 1979), Iranian footballer
- Ali Ghorbani (footballer, born 1990), Iranian footballer
- Mehdi Ghorbani (born 1988), Iranian boxer
- Pirouz Ghorbani (born 1978), Iranian footballer
- Alireza Ghorbani (born 1972), Iranian traditional vocalist
- Babak Ghorbani (1989–2014), Iranian wrestler
- Mohammad Ghorbani (wrestler) (born 1943), retired Iranian flyweight freestyle wrestler
- Omid Ghorbani (born 1993), Iranian footballer
- Shireen Ghorbani, American politician from Utah
- Ali Ghorbani (disambiguation)
- Ali Mohammad Ghorbani, Iranian reformist
- Mahmoud Ghorbani
- Mousa Ghorbani
