= Googoosh Music Academy =

- Also known as: Googoosh Academy
- Presented by: Raha Etemadi
- Judges: Googoosh; Hooman Khalatbari; Babak Saeedi
- Original language: Persian
- No. of seasons: 3

Production
- Production locations: London, United Kingdom

Original release
- Network: Manoto
- Release: 19 January 2011 – 22 March 2013

Googoosh Music Academy (Persian: آکادمی موسیقی گوگوش) is an Iranian television reality music competition to find new singing talent. The show began airing from London on 22 January 2011 and was broadcast by Manoto.

The judging panel consisted of Googoosh, as head judge and head of the academy, Hooman Khalatbari and Babak Saeedi. The show was hosted by Raha Etemadi in 3 seasons. The show was also launched in the British TV channel, Unique TV.

The show gained millions of fans and views inside and outside of Iran and It is described as an addition to the Idol franchise. It was the most viewed program of Manoto TV at the time.

== See also ==
- Stage (Iranian TV series)
- The Voice Persia
- Persia's Got Talent
