= Sandy (Iranian music band) =

Iranian composer, singer, and musician (born 1957)

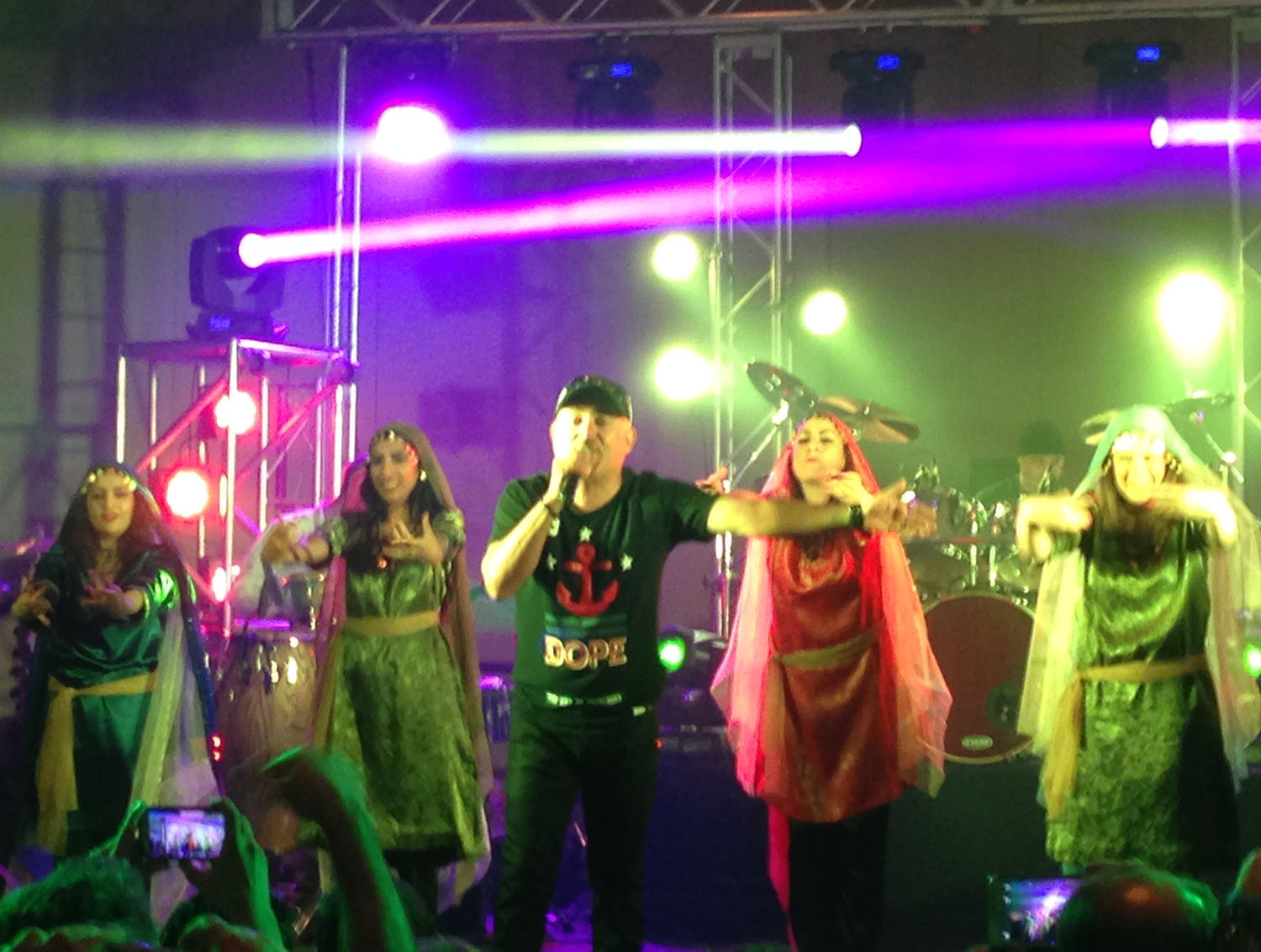
- Sandy Concert in Houston, in 2014

Background information
- Born: Shahram Khosroshahi Azar شهرام خسروشاهی آذر; 24 July 1957 (age 69); Abadan, Imperial State of Iran
- Genres: Persian pop music, Iranian hip hop, Bandari music
- Occupation: Singer
- Instrument: Keyboards
- Years active: 1984–present
- Website: www.shahramazar.com

Shahram Azar (Persian: شهرام آذر; born 24 July 1957), better known by his stage name Sandy (Persian: سندی), is a singer, composer, arranger, and keyboard player. Before the Iranian Revolution, he collaborated with notable singers such as Betty, Shahrokh and Nooshafarin. After the revolution, he worked closely with Ebi, arranging several songs and performing in concerts. Azar served as one of the four judges and main producers on the first two seasons of the talent show Stage, aired on Manoto TV.

== Early life ==
Shahram Azar was born in 1957 in Abadan, Iran. Azar began singing in elementary school and later developed an interest in playing musical instruments during high school. He won several national competitions and, after the Iranian Revolution, faced challenges due to the banning of music. In 1984, he immigrated to Germany. There, he continued his music career and founded the band Sandy in 1987. A few years later, he moved to the United States. Azar is married and has four children, including his son Khashayar, who is also a member of Sandy.

== Sandy ==
In 1987, Shahram Azar, along with Behzad Pishro, Reza Zamini, and Ahmad Abdollahi, formed the band Sandy in Frankfurt, Germany. The group's music blends pop lyrics with techno and Bandari influences. Sandy was one of the first bands to address social issues faced by Iranian youth, such as marriage, addiction, and immigration. They also recorded Persian rap songs including "Boro Baba" and "Pari." Azar's contributions to Sandy include singing, music composition, arranging songs, producing, and writing lyrics.

=== Band members ===
Shahram Khosroshahi Azar: Lead singer, composer, arranger, producer, and lyricist.

Khashayar Khosroshahi Azar: Shahram's son, who started playing the keyboard at age five and officially joined Sandy in 2002.

Behzad Pishro: Began his music career in Abadan and collaborated with various artists before co-founding Sandy. He is a drummer and music producer.

Sam Sohrabi: Migrated to Sweden during the Iran-Iraq war and later joined Sandy, contributing as a percussionist.

== Musical influence and style ==
Shahram Azar is known for his fusion of Western and Southern Iranian music. He has helped to introduce rap to Iranian music and addresses social issues through his lyrics. His song "Talagh" combines Bandari style with modern synthesizers, reflecting the cultural rhythms of Southern Iran.

== Discography ==
Studio albums

- 1990: Begoo Doostam Dari
- 1992: Tou Vasam Tak Hasti
- 1994: Dokhtar Haji Almas
- 1995: Ding Dang
- 1996: Cobra
- 1998: Top Singer (Khanandeh Top)
- 2000: Raghse Javona
- 2004: Tagh
- 2006: Sabok Sangin
- 2014: Station 7
- 2021: Album 22
