= Googoosh =

Iranian singer and actress (born 1950)

- گوگوش
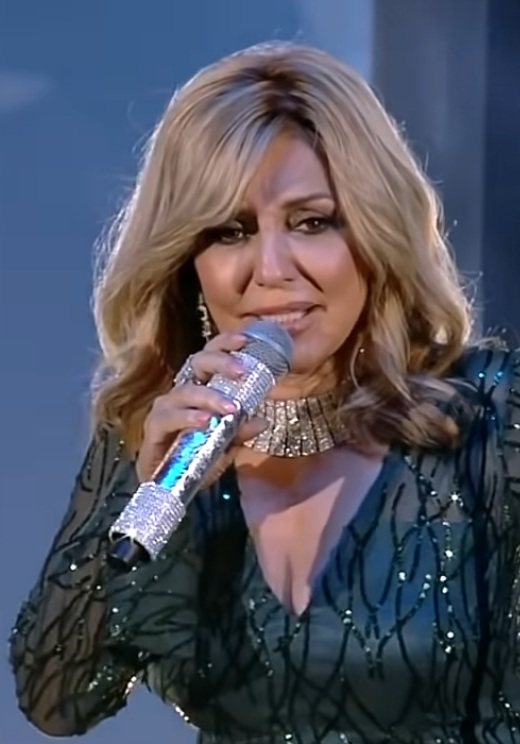
- Googoosh at the Hollywood Bowl, May 2018
- Born: Faegheh Atashin; 5 May 1950 (age 76); Tehran, Iran
- Occupations: Singer; actress
- Years active: 1953–1979; 2000–present
- Spouses: Mahmoud Ghorbani (m. 1967; div. 1972) Behrouz Vossoughi (m. 1975; div. 1976) Homayoun Mesdaghi (m. 1977; div. 1989) Masoud Kimiai (m. 1991; div. 2003)
- Children: 1
- Musical career
- Labels: Avang; Caltex Records; MZM; Pars Video; Taraneh Records; RCA Italiana; RCA Victor; Barclay
- Website: googooshconcerts.com

Faegheh Atashin (Note: Persian: فائقه آتشین) (born 5 May 1950), known professionally as Googoosh, (Note: گوگوش, Persian: [guːˈguːʃ]) is an Iranian singer and former actress. Regarded as a pop icon, she is one of the most popular and prolific entertainers in Iran, and her career has spanned over six decades. Googoosh has enjoyed significant popularity since the beginning of her career, ultimately becoming a cultural icon inside Iran and abroad.

She is mainly known for her contributions to Iranian pop music, but she also starred in a variety of Persian movies from the 1950s to the 1970s. She achieved the pinnacle of her fame and success towards the end of the 1970s. In the 1970s, Googoosh was widely emulated by Iranian women, as they copied her clothing (miniskirts) and her short haircut (known as the "Googooshi"). Following the 1979 Iranian Revolution, she remained in Tehran until 2000 and did not perform again during that period due to Iran's ban on female singers. Younger generations of Iranians have rediscovered her music via bootleg recordings. After leaving Iran in 2000, she performed a total of 27 concerts in European and North American countries in that year. Recent projects include a new collaboration with Iranian singer-songwriter Hassan Shamaizadeh from her 2012 album Ejaz, as well as serving as head judge and head of academy for the popular reality show Googoosh Music Academy broadcast on London-based satellite channel Manoto 1.

Since her return to the stage in the summer of 2000, she has performed in concerts and venues all around the world, including Madison Square Garden in New York City, the Air Canada Centre in Toronto, the Ericsson Globe in Stockholm, Honda Center in Anaheim, Royal Albert Hall in London and the Hollywood Bowl in Los Angeles She has recorded songs in many languages including Persian, Azerbaijani, Turkish, English, Spanish, Italian, Arabic, Armenian and French. She has a significant following outside of Iran and has even received the attention of European and African media and press.

== Early life ==
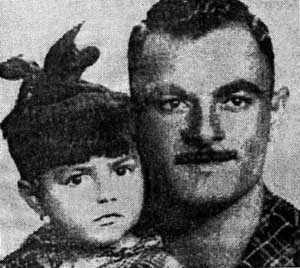
Googoosh began singing and acting at a young age with her father, Saber

4-year-old Googoosh with her mother Nasrin Atashin

Googoosh was born as Faegheh Atashin on 5 May 1950, in Tehran, Iran to Iranian Azerbaijani parents. She was quickly called "Googoosh", an Armenian name normally exclusively used for boys but which became her stage name. In an interview she noted that she was called Googoosh from a very early age; in her birth certificate however her birth name Faegheh is recorded.

== Career ==
=== Before the Revolution (1953–1979) ===
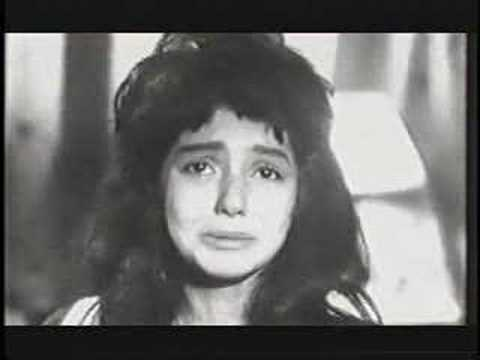
Googoosh acting as a child, late 1950s

Googoosh began her career at a very young age as a singer and dancer working in the stage shows of her father, Saber, a cabaret artist and acrobat. As a child actress, she appeared in several films in the 1960s such as Fear and Hope.

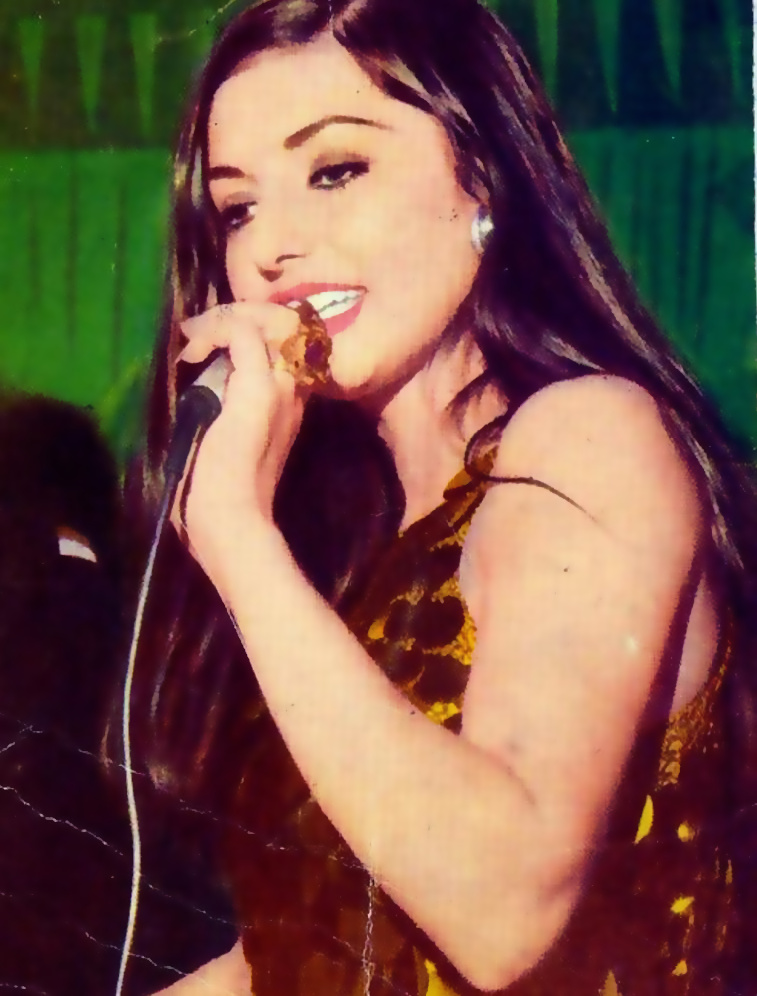
Googoosh performing on stage in Tehran, before 1979

During the 1970s, Googoosh began her recording career and a meteoric rise to fame and success. Known for her flamboyant outfits and fashion sense, Googoosh wowed her pop-culture-hungry fans in Iran and abroad with her trademark hairdos and hip-elegant style, inspiring many Iranian women to copy her hairdos. Her music ranged from upbeat 1960s and 1970s pop, given a traditional-tinged edge, to declamatory, emotional ballads dealing with love and loss, comparable to the chanson style of music by artists like Édith Piaf. Her music was popular among non-Persian-speaking audiences as well. She starred in over 25 movies, one of which was to be the most commercially successful Iranian motion picture of all time. Googoosh performed many times for the royal family and was a favorite of Shah Mohammad Reza Pahlavi's wife and children. She performed at the party given for the 17th birthday of Reza Pahlavi, Crown Prince of Iran.

=== Revolution and hiatus (1979–2000) ===
At the time of the 1979 Iranian Revolution, Googoosh was in Los Angeles. However, feeling homesick, she decided to return to Iran. In response to why she remained in Iran after the revolution, she said that it was "out of love for her homeland". Despite being a symbol of many things that the revolution tried to overturn, especially related to perceptions of excessive Westernization, Googoosh remained in Iran for years afterward.

The regime imposed a lien on her residence, prevented her from receiving a passport and imprisoned her at one point. After the revolution, Googoosh, like other artists, was forbidden from performing and her material was banned. She did not perform again until Mohammad Khatami's presidency, during which she was allowed to tour outside of the country after obtaining a contract to perform overseas.

=== Departure from Iran and comeback (2000–present) ===
Googoosh left Iran and went to Canada in 2000, after being in Iran for 21 years following the Iranian Revolution. BMusic's Taghinia, says "Googoosh is the siren of that era [Pre-revolution] and important in that she's really a direct link to Iran's past." Chicago Tribune considers the return of Googoosh to be "more than just a pop milestone" but instead "a cultural marker, a measure of the way change occurs in a society that for more than two decades has tried to resist the tide of globalization by living in self-imposed isolation."

She released her first album after her comeback called Zartosht (Zoroaster) in 2000 with lyrics by Masoud Kimiaei (under the pseudonym Nosrat Farzaneh) and composed and arranged by Babak Amini and Babak Bayat.

In 2000, Googoosh sang in public, away from her homeland, for the first time after 21 years of silence to the acclaim of many long-time fans. The Googoosh Comeback Tour was a series of concerts starting in July 2000. She began with a sold-out concert at the Air Canada Centre in Toronto on 29 July 2000 (with an audience of more than 12,000), and eventually brought the tour to a conclusion in Dubai on 21 and 24 March 2001 on the occasion of the Iranian New Year, Nowruz. Her concert in Dubai was considered a homecoming for her, and out of the more than 20,000 members of the audience, seventy percent of them were Iranians who had crossed the Persian Gulf to hear her. The two Dubai concerts held special importance: it was the tour finale, and Googoosh was rumored to be planning to return to Iran.

In 2000, a feature-length documentary called Googoosh: Iran's Daughter was released which chronicled the singer's life and her icon-status while detailing the socio-political turmoil that led to the 1979 Revolution in Iran. Made by Iranian-American filmmaker Farhad Zamani, the documentary began production in 1998 and was made at a time when Googoosh was still forbidden to give interviews.

Googoosh started collaborating with Mehrdad Asemani with QQ Bang Bang (2003). They continued their collaborating in the albums Akharin Khabar (2004), Manifest (2005) and Shabe Sepid (2008). Most of the lyrics of these albums were by Shahyar Ghanbari. Googoosh appeared in the 2004 music video for the song "Otaghe Man" as The Tramp

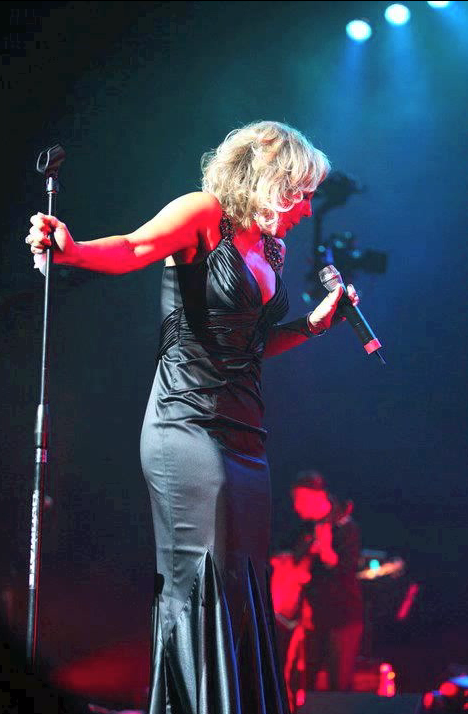
Googoosh in one of her concerts, 2006

Beginning in 2011, she served as head-of-academy and head-judge alongside Hooman Khalatbari and Babak Saeedi for the widely popular talent show/singing competition Googoosh Music Academy, which was broadcast on the London-based Iranian satellite channel Manoto 1 and was their most watched program. Googoosh Music Academy lasted three seasons. In December 2010, Googoosh held a very notable concert in the Kurdish region of Iraq, to which tens of thousands of Iranians came from Tehran and beyond.

In 2010, Googoosh ran a Persian talent competition show called Googoosh Music Academy. The series ran in Europe and Middle East on Monoto TV channes.

Googoosh released the album Hajme Sabz (Green X) in 2010. She said: "I have tried to have works from different composers and songwriters in this new album". Googoosh chose the name "Aasheghaaneh" for this album, but because of her interest in the book "Hajme Sabz" (The Green Space) by Sohrab Sepehri, she changed the name of the album. She released her old song Mano Gonjeshkaye Khooneh with a new arrangement by Babak Amini in this album.

In March 2011, Googoosh released a snippet of a new song she was working on, titled Bedrood, via YouTube. In April 2011, she debuted her latest project. The singer launched her own cosmetic collection sold online, titled Googoosh Cosmetics. In April 2011, she held a concert at the Nokia Theatre in Los Angeles, as well as a record breaking performance at the same venue on 27 October 2012, as a part of her worldwide Ejaz Tour. Also on 26 March 2013 she performed at London's Royal Albert Hall for the first time.

In 2012, Googoosh released her 6th studio album since her comeback, titled Ejaz. The album consisted of 10 tracks, featuring collaborations with Hassan Shamaizadeh (Hayahoo) and three songs wherein she collaborated with her fellow Googoosh Music Academy judge Babak Saeedi and with Raha Etemadi (Nagoo Bedrood and Noghteye Payan and Hese Mobham). She also collaborated with Alireza Afkari and Roozbeh Bemani on three songs (E'jaz and Baraye Man and Behesht). Another single Bi Manoto was a musical rendition of a poem by the Persian poet Rumi. The poem came to Googoosh's attention while she was banned from singing at the time of the Iran–Iraq War. She stated that she felt inspired by the lyrics and therefore created her own melody and was finally presented with the opportunity to record it as she had long hoped to do.

In February 2014, she released a music video of the song Behesht, in support of the gay and lesbian community in Iran, which faces significant challenges in its struggle for equal rights, including the ongoing threat of the death penalty for convictions related to sexual orientation. This made her the first prominent Iranian with a huge following to speak out against homophobia in Iran.

In the same year, Googoosh released a joint single with Ebi called Nostalgia. She started a joint world tour with Ebi with the same name, in which each of them sang some solo songs and some songs together.

On 21 March 2015, Googoosh released her 7th album titled Aks-e Khosoosi (Private Portrait) including 11 tracks from different songwriters and composers such as Babak Sahraee, Nickan Ebrahimi, Babak Amini (Googoosh band leader). The first song of this album is Che Ziba Bood, which is also the last song that was composed by Varujan. Googoosh sang the old tasnif Morq-e sahar in this album.

In 2017, Googoosh started a world tour called "The Memory Makers" with Hassan Shamaizadeh and Ardalan Sarfraz. In the Los Angeles concert of this tour, Ardalan Sarfraz could not attend and Martik was present in this concert.

In 2018, Googoosh released a single song in collaboration with Martik called Refaghat, and after positive feedback, she collaborated with Martik in two other songs called Eshghe Kamyab and Asheghet Hastam.

Googoosh released her last album named Twenty One in 2021 with the composition of Siavash Ghomayshi and the lyrics of Raha Etamadi. During production, the trio tested positive for COVID-19.

On 14 September 2023, Googoosh published a video on her official pages in the social media, in which she announced that her new tour (Final Chapter) is her last world tour and a farewell tour.

In 2024, a documentary about Googoosh, featuring her own presence, titled Googoosh – Made of Fire, was released in cinemas in Germany.

She published her memoir called Googoosh: A Sinful Voice on December 2, 2025, co-written with Tara Dehlavi, and the Persian translation of this book, translated by Homa Sarshar, was released on December 10 of the same year. In this book, she revealed for the first time the previously untold parts of her life.

== Politics ==
Googoosh and other speakers participated in a 22 July 2009 protest at the United Nations which attracted exiles from Iran. They stood in front of a banner with names of Iranian protestors who they believed were still incarcerated and of other protestors, written in red, who had been killed. During this protest, Googoosh made a speech stating that she entered politics because of the outcome of the 2009 Iranian presidential election. She said, "I have come here to be the voice for the sad mothers who lost their loved ones in peaceful demonstrations. I have come here to be the just voice of the grass-roots and spontaneous movement among my compatriots and to show my solidarity."

In 2018, Googoosh and Siavash Ghomayshi released the political song 40 Saal in criticism of the Islamic Republic.

Googoosh dedicated her Frankfurt 2022 concert to Mahsa Amini. She released the song Dobareh in support of Iranian protests. She said at a gathering of Iranians in Washington: "Today I feel proud and angry, but I am still more hopeful than ever about the future of Iran, and I focus my anger on that obsessively hateful and resentful leader and the child-killing government."

Following the 2025–2026 Iranian protests, she announced that she would no longer perform live until “my people get their freedom.”

== Personal life ==
Googoosh has three half-brothers on her father's side and a brother and sister on her mother's side. One of her brothers died in his youth.

In 1980, Googoosh was imprisoned for nearly one month after the Iranian Revolution. In 2018, in reply to a question by interviewer about how she stays young, she said, "Love, music and lots of fruit!".

=== Marriages ===
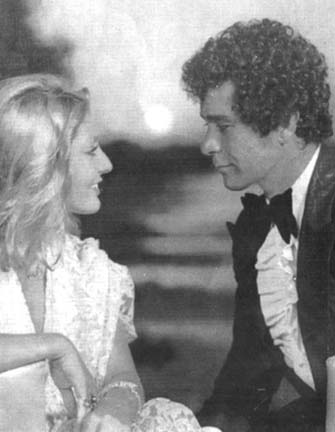
Googoosh and Behrouz Vosooghi in the 1970s

Googoosh's first husband was Mahmoud Ghorbani, a cabaret owner and music promoter who helped Googoosh make a name for herself in the 1960s. Googoosh and Ghorbani married in February 1967. They had a son, Kambiz. After about six years of marriage, Ghorbani and Googoosh divorced in late 1972.

In 1975, Googoosh married Iranian actor Behrouz Vossoughi; they divorced fourteen months later in 1976. During their brief marriage they were considered to be the country's biggest celebrity power couple. During the late 1970s, Googoosh became involved with Homayoun Mesdaghi, and married him in 1979. Six years later, in 1985, she divorced Mesdaghi. She then married director Masoud Kimiai in 1991. They divorced in 2003.

=== Religious beliefs ===
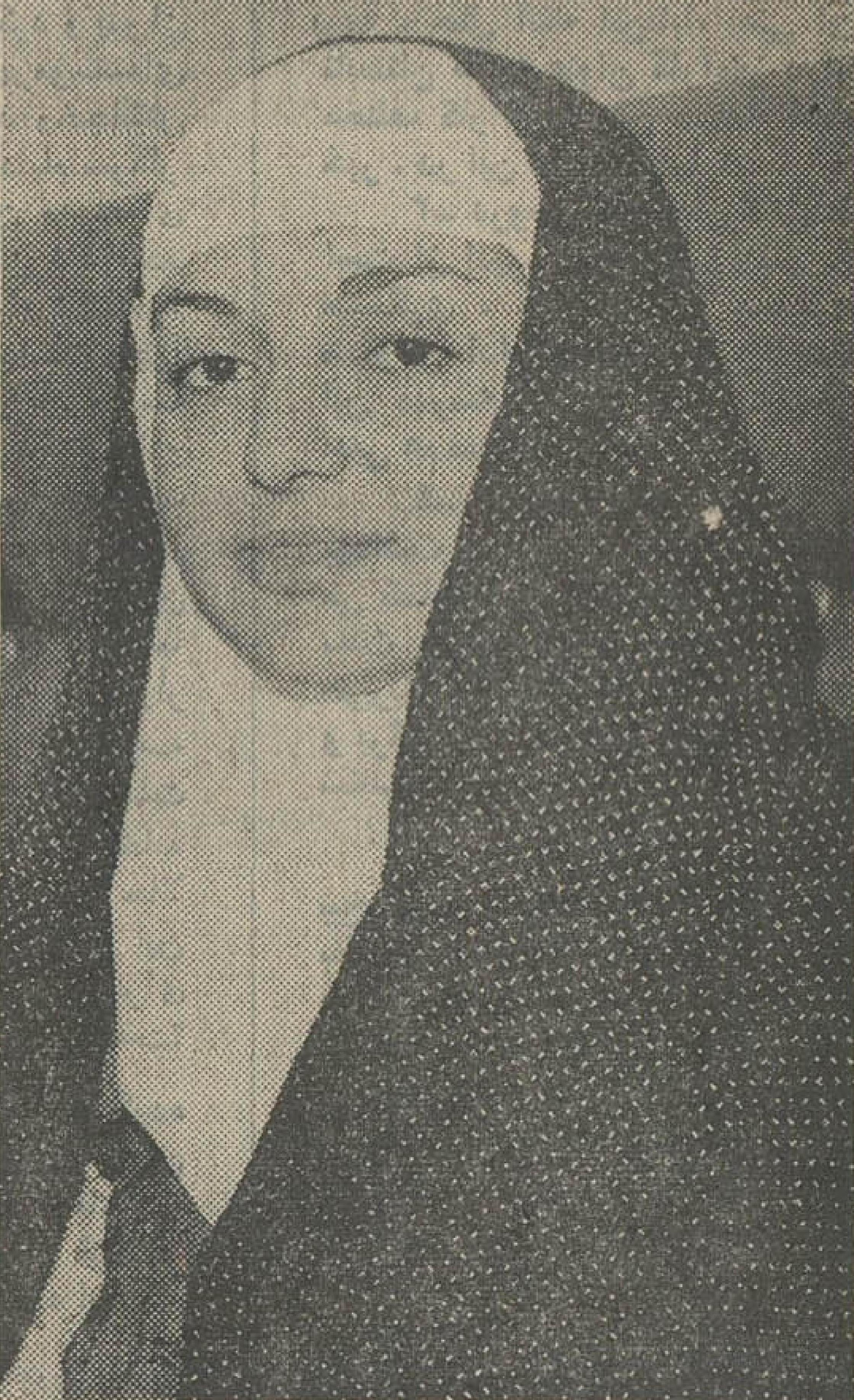
Googoosh wearing a Chador for pilgrimage to Imam Reza shrine by Ettela'at Newspaper (29 August 1972)

Googoosh is a Twelver Shia Muslim. She became a non-practicing Muslim in 2004 according to her 2023 interview, where she said: "I used to pray every day until 2004."

In her interview with Homa Sarshar in 2022, she stated that she used to have beliefs, but her beliefs were "broken".

In 2023, she posted a video on her official YouTube page and Instagram from one of her concerts, in which she explains that she uses "God" instead of "Kaaba" in the performance of the song Marham due to distance from religion. Googoosh had previously explained in Manoto's "Behtarinhaye Behtarinha" that she requested this lyric change from Ardalan Sarfraz after her pilgrimage to Mecca.

== Discography ==
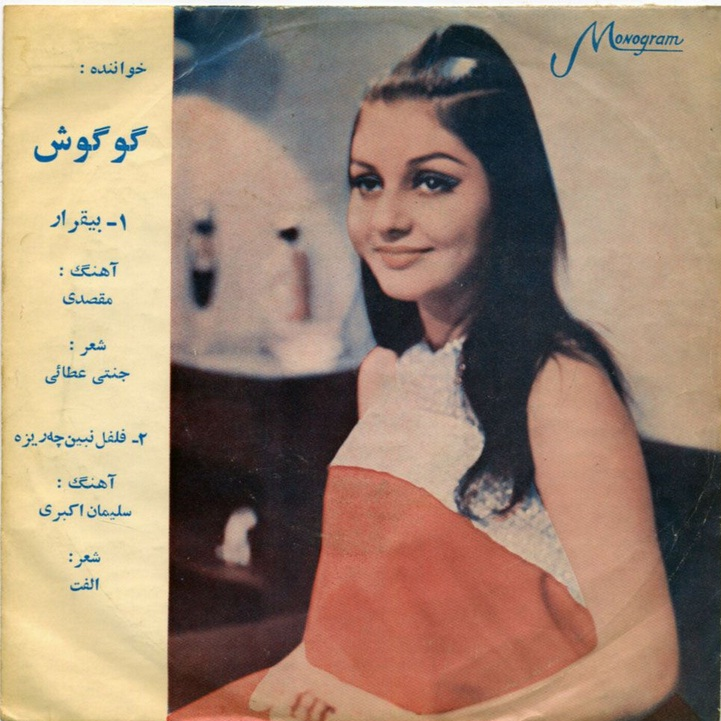
An album cover which contains the Bigharar song

Studio albums

- 1970: Do Panjereh (Two Windows)
- 1970: Fasle Tazeh (New Season)
- 1971: Mordab (The Swamp)
- 1971: Nimeye Gomshodeye Man (My Lost Half)
- 1972: Kooh (The Mountain)
- 1973: Mano Gonjeshkaye Khooneh (Me and the house Sparrows)
- 1974: Do Mâhi (Two Fish)
- 1974: Hamsafar (Co-Traveler)
- 1975: Pol (The Bridge)
- 1975: Mosabbeb (With Dariush)
- 1977: Dar emtedâde shab (Along the Night)
- 1978: Ageh bemouni (If You Stay)

Studio albums (since her return to music in 2000)

- 2000: Zartosht
- 2003: QQ Bang Bang
- 2004: Akharin Khabar (Latest News)
- 2005: Manifest
- 2008: Shabe Sepid (White Night)
- 2010: Hajme Sabz (Green X)
- 2012: Ejaz (Miracle)
- 2015: Akse Khosoosi (Private Portrait)
- 2021: Twenty One
- 2027: Pishkesh (with Pink Martini)

Singles (since her return to music)

- 2011: Yeh Harfaei (Live TV Performance On Manoto1)
- 2014: Nostalgia (ft. Ebi)
- 2014: Do Panjereh (ft. Ebi)
- 2014: Ki Ashkato Pak Mikoneh (ft. Ebi)
- 2014: Hamzad (Twin) (New Arrangement)
- 2016: Hastamo Nistam (I am and I am not)
- 2017: Do Panjereh (Two Windows) (New Version)
- 2017: Sogand (Oath)
- 2018: Mosalas-e Khatereha (The Memory Triangle) (ft. Hassan Shamaizadeh)
- 2018: Ajab Jaei (What a Place)
- 2018: Roya (Dream) "Unofficial Version Of The Witness"
- 2018: Shahed (Witness)
- 2018: 40 Saal (40 years) (ft. Siavash Ghomayshi)
- 2018: Talagh "Remix 2018" (Divorce)
- 2018: Mordab "Live Version" (The Swamp) (ft. Hassan Shamaizadeh)
- 2018: Refaghat (Friendship) (ft. Martik)
- 2019: Eshghe Kamyab (Rare Love) (ft. Martik)
- 2019: Darde Man (My Pain)
- 2020: Fardamon (Our Tomorrow)
- 2020: Harigh (Fire)
- 2021: Gohare Kamyab (Rare Gem)
- 2021: Tooye Tehran (In Tehran) (Demo Recording In 2017)
- 2022: Rooze Khoob (Good Day) (Recorded 43 years ago)
- 2022: Naaz Edkeh (Southern Song)
- 2022: Safar Mikonam (l Travel)
- 2022: Ghesseye Do Maahi "Live Version" (The Story Of Two Fish) (ft. Shahyar Ghanbari)
- 2022: Geryeh Dar Ragbaar (Crying in a barrage) (Recorded 44 years ago)
- 2022: Dobareh (Again) (ft. Leila Forouhar, Shahrzad Sepanlou, Darya Dadvar, Sogand & Shohreh Aghdashloo)
- 2023: Gol Bi Goldoon "Live Version"
- 2023: Hamvatan (Compatriot)
- 2025: Hamseda "Live Version"
- 2025: Mano Gonjeshka "Live Version"
- 2025: Makhloogh "Live Version"
- 2025: Azizam (My Dear) (ft. Ed Sheeran)

== Filmography ==
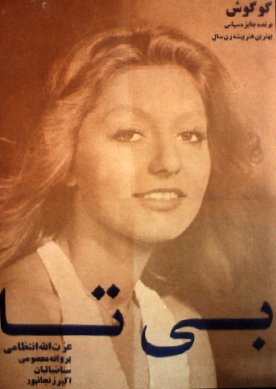
Poster for Googoosh's 1972 award-winning film Bita

Year	Persian title	English title
1960	فرشتۀ فراری	Runaway Angel
1960	بیم و امید	Fear and Hope
1963	پرتگاه مخوف	The Cliff of Fear
1965	شیطون بلا	The Naughty One
1966	گدایان تهران	The Beggars of Tehran
1966	فیل و فنجان	Big and Small
1966	حسین کُرد	Hoseyn-e Kord
1967	چهار خواهر	Four Sisters (with Leila Forouhar)
1967	دروازه تقدیر	The Gate of Fate
1967	گنج و رنج	Treasure and Toil
1967	در جستجوی تبهکاران	In the Search of Criminals
1968	سه ‌دیوانه	The Three Morons
1968	شب فرشتگان	The Night of Angels
1968	ستاره هفت آسـمان	The Star of Seven Skies
1969	گناه زیبایی	The Sin of Beauty
1970	طلوع	Sunrise
1970	جنجال عروسی	The Wedding Brawl
1970	پنجره	The Window
1971	احساس داغ	Hot Feeling
1971	آسـمون بی‌ستاره	Starless Sky
1971	قصاص	Retaliation
1972	بی‌تا	Bitā
1973	خیالاتی	Imaginings
1975	هـمسفر	Travelling Mate
1975	نازنین	Nazanin
1975	مـَمَل آمریکایی	American Mamal
1975	شب غریبان	Nostalgic Night
1976	ماه عسل	Honeymoon
1977	در امتداد شب	Along the Night

Googoosh also acted in two other movies: Mard-e keraye-i (مرد کرایه‌ای) and Hajji Firuz (حاجی فیروز), but the production of each of these films was suspended during the final stages for unknown reasons. Googoosh has also acted in many television shows and commercials in Iran.

== Books ==
- Googoosh: A Sinful Voice (2025)

== Tours and concerts since 2000 ==
=== Comeback World Tour (2000–2001) ===
Country	City	Venue	Date
Canada	Toronto	Air Canada Centre	29 July 2000
Canada	Vancouver	Pacific Coliseum	5 August 2000
United States	Los Angeles	The Forum	19 August 2000
United States	New York	Nassau Coliseum	26 August 2000
United States	Houston	Compaq Center	3 September 2000
United States	Washington, D.C	MCI Center	16 September 2000
United States	Oakland	Oakland Arena	23 September 2000
United States	Orange County	Arrowhead Pond	7 October 2000
United States	Los Angeles	Staples Center	21 October 2000
United States	Chicago	UIC Pavilion	28 October 2000
United States	San Jose	San Jose Arena	5 November 2000
United States	Atlantic City	Trump Taj Mahal	18 November 2000
United States	Las Vegas	MGM Grand Garden Arena	24 December 2000
United States	Las Vegas	MGM Grand Garden Arena	25 December 2000
Germany	Oberhausen	Oberhausen Arena	30 December 2000
Germany	Frankfurt	Festhalle Frankfurt	1 January 2001
United Kingdom	London	Wembley Arena	6 January 2001
Sweden	Stockholm	Globen Arena	13 January 2001
Germany	Bremen	Stadthalle Bremen	24 February 2001
Sweden	Stockholm	Globen Arena	3 March 2001
France	Paris	Zenith Hall	16 March 2001
United Kingdom	London	Wembley Arena	17 March 2001
Austria	Vienna	Wiener Stadthalle	18 March 2001
United Arab Emirates	Dubai	Dubai World Trade Centre	21 March 2001
United Arab Emirates	Dubai	Al Ahli Club Stadium	24 March 2001
Tunisia	Tunis	Carthage Amphitheater	19 July 2001
Canada	Toronto	Air Canada Centre	18 August 2001
THE END

=== 2003–2005 concerts ===
Country		Venue	Date	
United States	Los Angeles	The Forum	8 February 2003	
United States	Orange County	Honda Center	24 May 2003	
United States	Washington, D.C	Verizon Center	4 October 2003	
United States	Las Vegas	Thomas & Mack Center	25 December 2004	With Mehrdad Asemani
United States	Los Angeles	The Forum	17 September 2005	With Mehrdad Asemani
United States	Fairfax	Patriot Center	24 September 2005	With Mehrdad Asemani
United States	San Francisco	Bill Graham Civic Auditorium	12 November 2005	With Mehrdad Asemani
United States	Las Vegas	Thomas & Mack Center	24 December 2005	With Mehrdad Asemani
THE END

=== Googoosh & Mehrdad Asemani: 2006 concerts ===
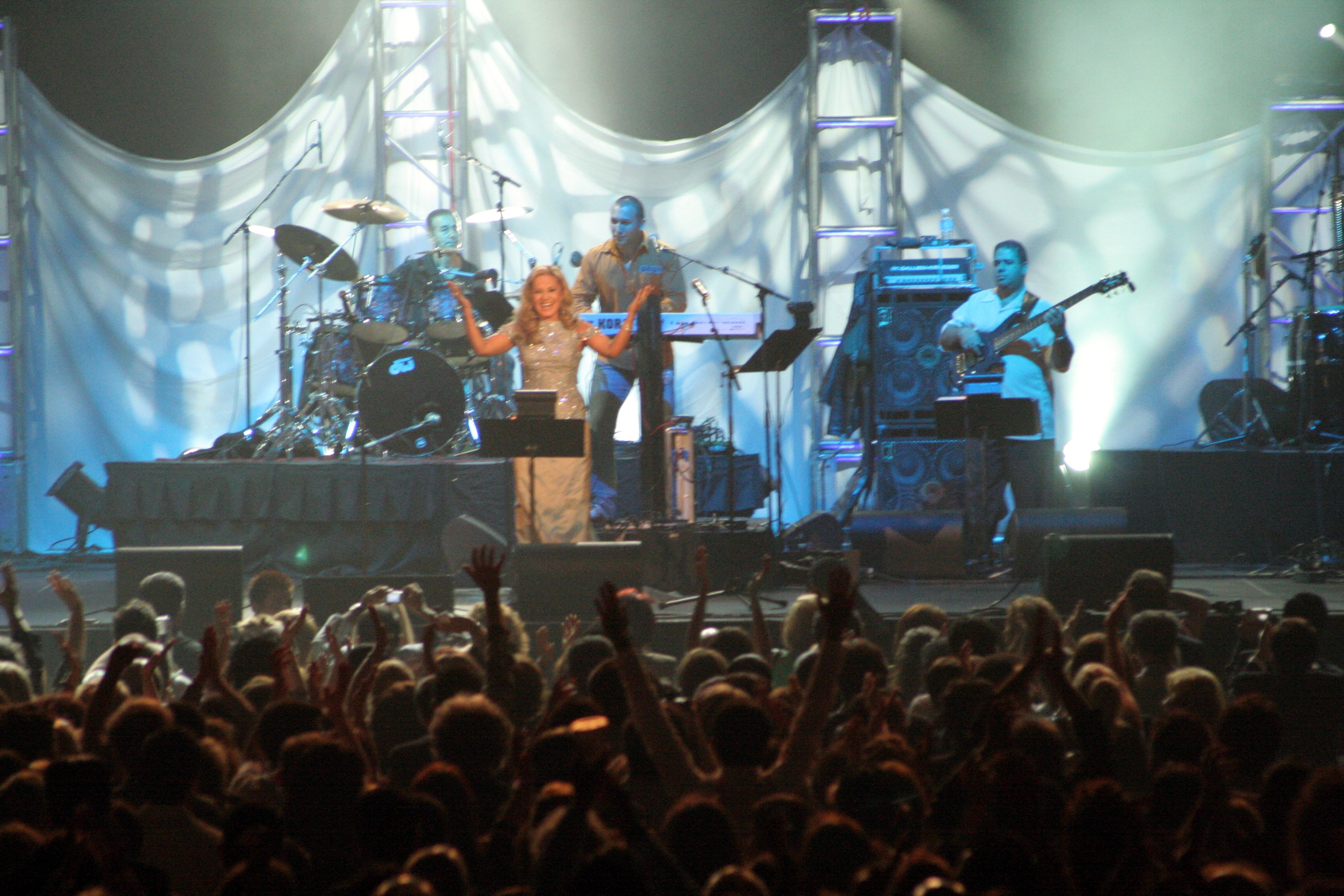
Googoosh in at the 2006 Air Canada Centre in Toronto

Country		Venue	Date
United States	Dallas	Nokia Theatre	11 March 2006
Canada	Vancouver	GM Place	27 May 2006
Canada	Toronto	Air Canada Centre	3 June 2006
United States	San Diego	Symphony Hall	9 September 2006
United States	Los Angeles	Kodak Theater	7 October 2006
United States	Los Angeles	Kodak Theater	8 October 2006
United States	New York	Madison Square Garden	21 October 2006
THE END

=== Googoosh & Mehrdad Asemani: 2007 concerts ===
Country		Venue	Date
United States	Atlanta	Atlanta Civic Center	13 January 2007
United States	San Jose	Flint Center	20 January 2007
Canada	Toronto	Air Canada Centre	7 July 2007
United States	Miami	Knight Concert Hall	15 September 2007
Canada	Vancouver	Queen Elizabeth Theatre	1 December 2007
Germany	Oberhausen	Oberhausen Arena	25 December 2007
Sweden	Stockholm	Globen Arena	27 December 2007
United Kingdom	London	The Hammersmith Apollo	29 December 2007
THE END

=== Googoosh & Mehrdad Asemani: 2008 concerts ===
Country		Venue	Date	
United States	Houston	George R. Brown Convention Center	15 March 2008	
United Arab Emirates	Dubai	Dubai Media City	26 March 2008	Without Mehrdad Asemani
United States	Ledyard	MGM Grand at Foxwoods Resort & Casino	28 June 2008	
United States	Los Angeles	Nokia Theatre	23 August 2008	
THE END

=== Googoosh: Memory Lane World Tour (2009–2010) ===
Country		Venue	Date
United States	Oakland	Paramount Theatre	21 March 2009
United States	Washington, D.C	DAR Constitution Hal	6 June 2009
Australia	Melbourne	Dallas Brooks Centre	7 August 2009
Australia	Sydney	Sydney Convention Centre	8 August 2009
Malaysia	Kuala Lumpur	KLCC Concert Hall	19 September 2009
United Arab Emirates	Dubai	World Trade Center	29 November 2009
United Kingdom	London	Wembley Arena	21 March 2010
United Arab Emirates	Dubai	World Trade Center	23 March 2010
Canada	Toronto	Ricoh Coliseum	17 April 2010
Turkey	Antalya	Konyaalti Open Air Theater	1 August 2010
Iraq	Erbil	Babylon World Amphitheatre	12 September 2010
Turkey	Istanbul	Istanbul Convention Cente	15 September 2010
Canada	Vancouver	Queen Elizabeth Theatr	18 September 2010
Sweden	Stockholm	Kista Massan	24 December 2010
Germany	Koln	Koln Arena	25 December 2010
THE END

=== 2011 concerts ===
Country		Venue	Date
United States	San Jose	Flint Center	26 February 2011
Turkey	Istanbul	Istanbul Congress Center	24 March 2011
Malaysia	Kuala Lumpur	Merdeka Hall	27 March 2011
United States	Los Angeles	Nokia Theatre	9 April 2011
Monaco	Monte Carlo	Grimaldi Forum Monaco	23 July 2011
Turkey	Antalya	Konyaalti Open Air Theater	25 July 2011
United Arab Emirates	Dubai	Shoppiesta	2 September 2011
Germany	Hamburg	O2 World	23 December 2011
France	Paris	Théâtre du Châtelet	26 December 2011
THE END

=== 2012 concerts ===
Country		Venue	Date
Canada	Vancouver	Queen Elizabeth Theatre	3 March 2012
United States	Washington, D.C	DAR Constitution Hall	17 March 2012
United Kingdom	London	Royal Theater Drury Lane	20 March 2012
Canada	Montreal	Place des arts	14 April 2012
Canada	Toronto	Powerade center	28 April 2012
Turkey	Antalya	Konyaalti Open Air Theater	18 August 2012
United States	San Francisco	Louise M. Davies Symphony Hall	25 August 2012
United States	Houston	Hobby Center	15 September 2012
Canada	Calgary	Southern Alberta Jubilee Auditorium	6 October 2012
THE END

=== Ejaz World Tour (2012–2014) ===
Country		Venue	Date
United States	Los Angeles	Nokia Theatre	27 October 2012
Sweden	Stockholm	Radisson Waterfront Congress Centre	23 December 2012
Germany	Koln	Koln Arena	25 December 2012
United Arab Emirates	Dubai	World Trade Centre	24 March 2013
United Kingdom	London	Royal Albert Hall	26 March 2013
Canada	Toronto	Meridian Hall	11 May 2013
Turkey	Antalya	Konyaalti Open Air Theater	18 August 2013
Canada	Vancouver	Queen Elizabeth Theatre	7 September 2013
Canada	Ottawa	National Arts Centre	28 September 2013
Australia	Melbourne	Dallas Brook Hall	25 October 2013
Australia	Sydney	Hillsong Auditorium Convention Centre	26 October 2013
Austria	Vienna	Austria Center	21 December 2013
Germany	Koln	Lanxess Arena	25 December 2013
Sweden	Stockholm	Radisson Waterfront Congress Centre	28 December 2013
United States	Dallas	Verizon Theatre	8 February 2014
United States	San Jose	Flint Centre	22 February 2014
United States	Washington, D.C	DAR Constitution Hall	1 March 2014
United States	New York	Kupferberg Center for the Arts	15 March 2014
THE END

=== Googoosh & Ebi: Nostalgia World Tour (2014) ===
Country		Venue	Date
United Arab Emirates	Dubai	World Trade Centre	21 March 2014
Canada	Toronto	Air Canada Centre	21 June 2014
United States	Orange County	Honda Center	16 August 2014
Turkey	Antalya	Konyaalti Open Air Theater	31 August 2014
Canada	Vancouver	Thunderbird Arena	8 November 2014
United States	Washington, D.C	Patriot Center	28 November 2014
United States	San Jose	San Jose Event Center	29 November 2014
Germany	Koln	Koln Arena	20 December 2014
United Kingdom	London	Wembley Arena	23 December 2014
United States	Las Vegas	Mandalay Bay Arena	27 December 2014
THE END

=== Googoosh: Akse Khosoosi World Tour (2015–2016) ===
Country		Venue	Date
Canada	Montreal	Place Des Arts	4 April 2015
Turkey	Antalya	Konyaalti Open Air Theater	30 August 2015
Australia	Sydney	Olympic Sydney Dome	12 December 2015
Australia	Melbourne	Melbourne Convention Center	13 December 2015
Germany	Hamburg	Barclaycard Arena	19 December 2015
United States	Orlando	Bob Carr Theater	12 March 2016
United States	New York	Kupferberg Center for the Arts	19 March 2016
Turkey	Antalya	Cam Piramit	23 March 2016
Turkey	Antalya	Cam Piramit	29 March 2016
United States	San Jose	Flint Center	9 April 2016
Canada	Toronto	Ricoh Coliseum	30 April 2016
United States	Los Angeles	Microsoft Theater	14 May 2016
United States	Chicago	Copernicus Center	28 May 2016
United States	Atlanta	Cobb Energy Center	27 August 2016
United States	Washington, D.C	DAR Constitution Hall	1 October 2016
Canada	Vancouver	Queen Elizabeth Theatre	3 December 2016
Germany	Frankfurt	Jahrhunderthalle	17 December 2016
United Kingdom	London	The SSE Arena	22 December 2016
Sweden	Stockholm	Victoria Hall	25 December 2016
THE End

=== 2017 concerts ===
Country		Venue	Date
United States	Phoenix	Mesa Arts Center	4 February 2017
United States	Houston	Hobby Center	18 February 2017
United States	New York	Kupferberg Center for the Arts	18 March 2017
United Arab Emirates	Dubai	World trade center	24 March 2017
Kuwait	Kuwait City	Kuwait Opera House	5 May 2017
United States	Orange County	Segerstorm Center for The Arts	1 July 2017
Armenia	Yerevan	Karen Demirchyan Sports and Concerts Complex	31 August 2017
Georgia	Tbilisi	Tbilisi Sports Palace	3 September 2017
Northern Cyprus	Famagusta	Kaya Artemis Resort and Casino	7 September 2017
Canada	Calgary	Southern Alberta Jubilee Auditorium	16 September 2017
Canada	Toronto	Meridian Hall	21 October 2017
Canada	Montreal	Place des arts	1 December 2017
THE END

=== The Memory Makers World Tour (With Hassan Shamaeizadeh & Ardalan Sarfaraz) (2017–2018) ===
Country		Venue	Date
Sweden	Gothenburg	Lisebergshallen	22 December 2017
Germany	Düsseldorf	ISS Dome	23 December 2017
Germany	Hamburg	Barclaycard Arena	30 December 2017
United States	Washington, D.C	DAR Constitution Hall	24 February 2018
United States	New York	Beacon Theatre	2 March 2018
Netherlands	Amsterdam	The Concertgebouw	17 March 2018
United Arab Emirates	Dubai	Dubai Opera House	20 March 2018
Georgia	Tbilisi	Tbilisi Sports Palace	22 March 2018
Armenia	Yerevan	Karen Demirtchian Sport/Concert Complex	23 March 2018
Turkey	Istanbul	Istanbul Congress Center	25 March 2018
United States	San Jose	Flint Center	14 April 2018
United States	Los Angeles	Hollywood Bowl	12 May 2018
Canada	Vancouver	The Orpheum	26 May 2018
Australia	Melbourne	Melbourne Convention & Entertainment Centre	2 November 2018
Australia	Sydney	Hillsong Auditorium Convention Centre	3 November 2018
United States	Orlando	Dr. Phillips Center for the Performing Arts	17 November 2018
United States	Chicago	Copernicus Center	30 November 2018
Sweden	Stockholm	Annexet	8 December 2018
United Kingdom	London	The Hammersmith Apollo	9 December 2018
Austria	Vienna	Wiener Stadthalle	15 December 2018
THE END

=== Googoosh & Martik: The Friendship World Tour (2018–2019) ===
Country		Venue	Date
United States	Las Vegas	The Colosseum	22 December 2018
United States	Houston	Hobby Center	12 January 2019
Canada	Toronto	Coca-Cola Coliseum	23 February 2019
United States	Atlanta	Cobb Energy Performing Arts Center	24 August 2019
United States	San Jose	Center for the Performing Arts	21 September 2019
United States	Dallas	The Theater at Grand Pride	5 October 2019
United States	New York	Kupferberg Center for the Arts	2 November 2019
United States	Orange County	Honda Center	9 November 2019
Canada	Vancouver	Orpheum Theatre	16 November 2019
United States	Washington, D.C	DAR Constitution Hall	23 November 2019
France	Paris	Palais des Congrès	20 December 2019
Sweden	Gothenburg	Scandinavium	21 December 2019
Netherlands	Rotterdam	De Doelen	25 December 2019
Germany	Frankfurt	Jahrhunderthalle	28 December 2019
Germany	Hamburg	Barclays Arena	30 December 2019
THE END

=== Googoosh: 21, The World Tour (2021–2022) ===
Country		Venue	Date	
United States	Los Angeles	Beverly Hilton (VIP Guests Only)	22 August 2021	
United States	San Jose	Center for the Performing Arts	11 September 2021	
United States	Washington, D.C	DAR Constitution Hall	2 October 2021	
United States	Chicago	Copernicus Center	16 October 2021	
United States	New York	Tilles Center	27 November 2021	
United States	Las Vegas	The Chelsea at the Cosmopolitan of Las Vegas	25 December 2021	
United States	Houston	Hobby Center	22 January 2022	Final Appearance
Germany	Oberhausen	Rudolf Weber Arena	12 March 2022	Final Appearance
United Arab Emirates	Dubai	Jubilee Stage at Expo 2020	17 March 2022	
United Kingdom	London	The London Palladium	21 March 2022	
Turkey	Antalya	Nirvana Cosmopolitan	23 March 2022	
Turkey	Istanbul	Yahya Kemal Beyatlı Performing Arts Center	25 March 2022	
Turkey	Antalya	Nirvana Cosmopolitan	28 March 2022	
Canada	Vancouver	Queen Elizabeth Theatre	15 April 2022	
United States	San Diego	Balboa Theatre	17 April 2022	Final Appearance
Canada	Toronto	Meridian Hall	14 May 2022	
United States	Orange County	Segerstrom Center for the Arts	2 July 2022	
United States	Atlanta	Cobb Energy Performing Arts Center	27 August 2022	Final Appearance
Turkey	Istanbul	Turkcell Vadi	14 September 2022	
Germany	Frankfurt	Jahrhunderthalle	18 September 2022	
Germany	Hamburg	Barclays Arena	23 September 2022	
Germany	Berlin	Verti Music Hall	25 September 2022	
Australia	Sydney	Sydney Opera House	6 November 2022	
Australia	Sydney	State Theatre	8 November 2022	Final Appearance
Australia	Melbourne	Palais Theatre	13 November 2022	Final Appearance
THE END

=== 2023 concerts ===
Country		Venue	Date	
Kuwait	Kuwait City	The Arena Kuwait	6 May 2023	Final Appearance
Canada	Toronto	Meridian Hall	3 June 2023	
Canada	Vancouver	Queen Elizabeth Theatre	9 June 2023	
THE END

=== Final Chapter, The World Tour (2023–) ===
Country		Venue	Date
United States	San Jose	Center for the Performing Arts	23 September 2023
Sweden	Stockholm	Victoria Hall	30 September 2023
Germany	Hannover	HCC Hannover	2 October 2023
Austria	Vienna	Wiener Stadthalle	6 October 2023
Germany	Stuttgart	Beethoven Hall	8 October 2023
United States	Las Vegas	The Chelsea at the Cosmopolitan of Las Vegas	24 December 2023
United States	New York	Beacon Theatre	6 January 2024
United Arab Emirates	Abu Dhabi	Saadiyat Nights Open-air Theatre	20 January 2024
Germany	Düsseldorf	PSD Bank Dome	27 January 2024
Turkey	Istanbul	Ülker Sports Arena	22 March 2024
United Kingdom	London	OVO Arena Wembley	28 March 2024
Germany	Frankfurt	Jahrhunderthalle	1 April 2024
Germany	Munich	Isar Philharmonic	7 April 2024
United Arab Emirates	Dubai	DEC at Expo City Dubai	12 April 2024
France	Paris	Palais des Congrès	20 April 2024
Canada	Toronto	Scotiabank Arena	17 January 2025
United States	Washington, D.C	The Anthem	24 January 2025
Canada	Vancouver	Pacific Coliseum	24 May 2025
Netherlands	Amsterdam	Not Applicable	
United States	Los Angeles	Not Applicable	

== Awards and achievements ==
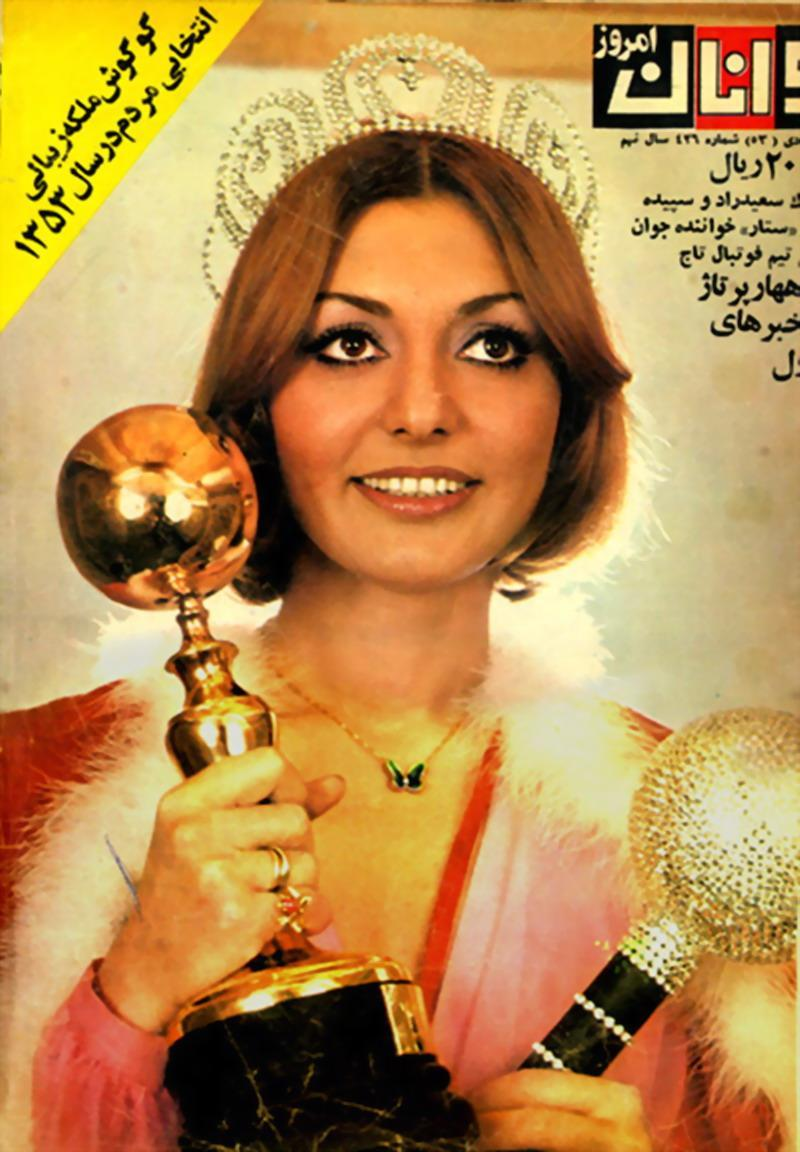
Googoosh on the cover of Javanan e Emrooz Magazine, 1974

- 1971: first prize and gold record for the best singer in the world at the Midem trade fair in Cannes for her 7" record (as "Gougoush") performing two songs in French produced by Barclay Records: "Retour de la Ville" (A-side) and "J'entends Crier Je T'aime" (B-side).
- 1972: Performed at Cantagiro Music Festival.
- 1972: Performed at the Carthage Music Festival
- 1972: First medal of arts of Tunisia
- 1973: The best actress for Bita in Iranian Sepas film festival.
- 1973: Recorded soundtrack (produced by RCA Records) of San Remo Music Festival.
- 2001: Performed at the Carthage Music Festival.
- 2014: Best Iranian Singer (World Music Awards)
- 2017: Best Music Video For Do Panjereh (Directed by Yasmin Asha)(Festigious Film Awards March 2017)
- Two awards from Microsoft Theatre in Los Angeles for record breaking performances
- 2022: Performed at the Expo Festival.
- 2024: Performed at the Saadiat Nights Festival.
- 2024: Arab Glamour 2024 (Enigma magazine)

== See also ==
- List of Iranian women
