= Reza Rohani =

Iranian pianist and composer

Reza Rohani رضا روحانی
- Born: October 31, 1977 (age 47); Rasht, Iran
- Genres: Classical
- Occupation(s): Classical pianist, composer
- Instrument: Piano
- Years active: 2010–present
- Labels: Pardis Records

Reza Rohani (Persian: رضا روحانی; born October 31, 1977) is an Iranian pianist and composer. He is the son of Iranian composer Anoushiravan Rohani. He was one of the judges in the Iranian television reality music competition, Stage on Manoto.

== Early life ==
Rohani was born in 1977. At the age of 15, he left Tehran and travelled to Germany to study classical music. After finishing school after three years in the Bavarian College of Music, he studied jazz. In 2005 he graduated from Hochschule Fur Musik und Theatre in Hannover.

== Discography ==
=== Studio albums ===
Rohani has published three albums, and several singles with Sara Naeini.

- Fragile Silence, 2010
- Moonseed, 2010
- Gypsy, 2015

=== Singles ===
- "Bayad Del Sepord"
- "Jane Maryam"
- "Nafas"
- "Jadoo" (ft. Sara Naeini)
- "Mano To" (ft. Sara Naeini)
- "Asheghe Khoondan" (ft. Sara Naeini)
- "Emshab" (ft. Sara Naeini)
- "Didare Jodaee" (ft. Sara Naeini)
- "Del-Yaar" (ft. Sara Naeini)
