= Stage (TV series) =

- Also known as: X Factor Iran
- Created by: Simon Cowell
- Presented by: Raha Etemadi
- Judges: Shahram Azar; Hamed Nikpay; Babak Saeedi; Reza Rohani
- Original language: Persian
- No. of seasons: 2

Production
- Producers: Roxy Amini; Saber (Roxy Saber)
- Production locations: London, United Kingdom

Original release
- Network: Manoto
- Release: 7 January 2016 – 20 March 2017

Related
- The X Factor

Stage (Persian: استیج), also known as Manoto Stage, is an Iranian television reality music competition, based on the original British series, and an addition to The X Factor franchise, to find new singing talent. The show began airing from London on 7 January 2016 and was broadcast by Manoto.

The judging panel consisted of Shahram Azar (Sandy), Hamed Nikpay, Babak Saeedi and Reza Rohani. The show was hosted by Raha Etemadi in 2 seasons. In addition, Stage has brought in several famous musical guest stars to perform live on the show, including Aref, Afshin, Sepideh, Ava Bahram and Shahab Tiam.

The winners were chosen by people's votes in Manoto application and receive a $50.000 prize. The winners of season 1 and 2 were respectively Amirhossein Eftekhari from Hamed Nikpay's group and Alireza Saremi from Reza Rouhani's group.

== Stage Xtra ==
Stage Xtra was aired every Friday during the second season. It showed behind the scenes, absent voices, and events of the stage show.

== See also ==
- Googoosh Music Academy
- The Voice Persia
- Persia's Got Talent
