= Ali Ghorbani =

Ali Ghorbani may refer to:

- Ali Ghorbani (footballer, born 1979), Iranian football midfielder who plays for Parseh Tehran
- Ali Ghorbani (footballer, born 1990), Azerbaijani and Iranian football striker who plays for Sumgayit
