= Nazanin Nour =

American actress

- نازنین نوشین‌نور
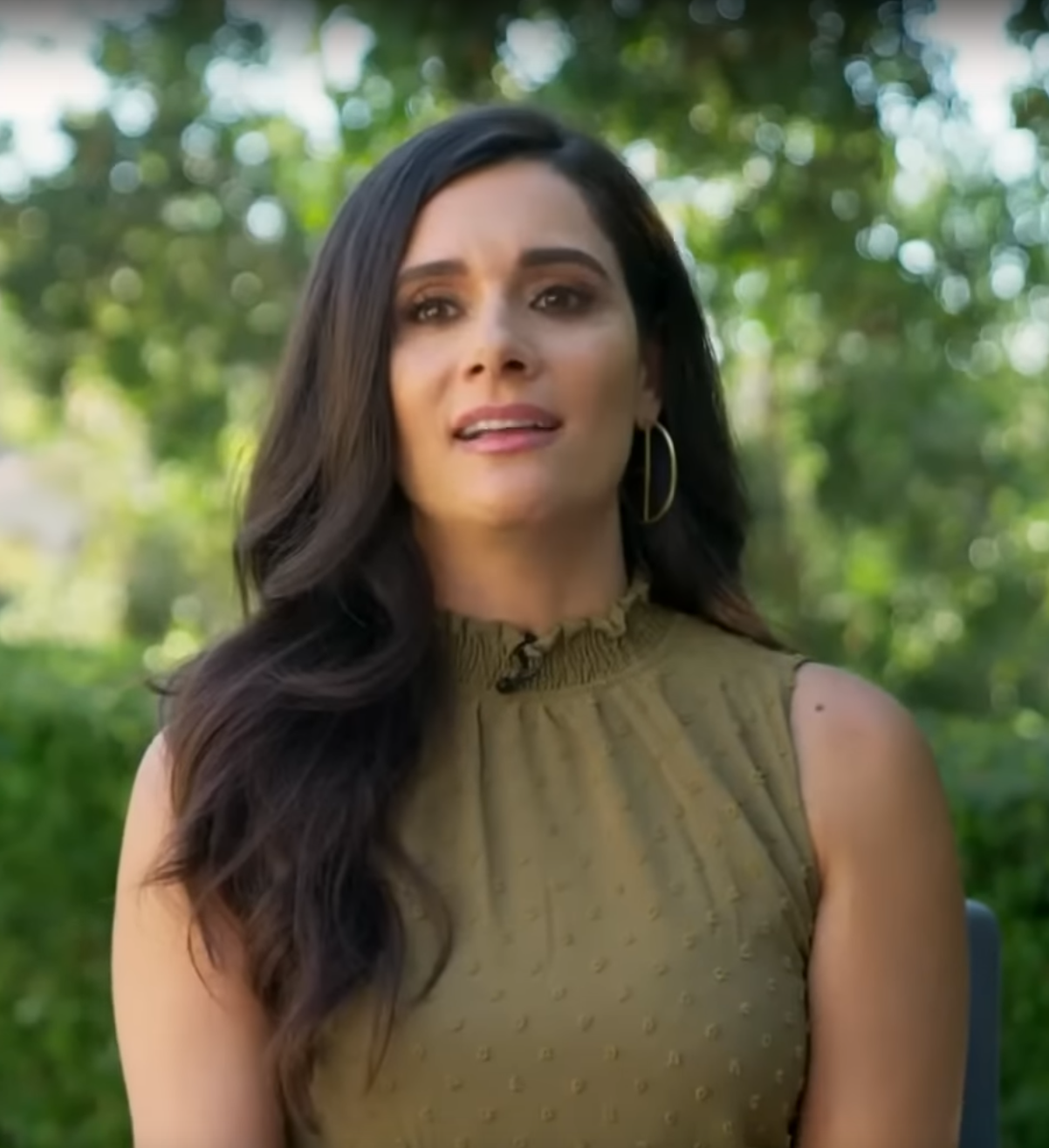
- Born: Nazanin Noushin-Nour; January 3, 1982 (age 44); Arlington, Virginia, U.S.
- Education: George Mason University
- Occupations: Actress, writer
- Years active: 2007–present

Nazanin Nour (Persian: نازنین نور, alternatively romanized as Nāzanin Nūr; Persian pronunciation: [nɒːzæˈniːn nuːɾ] born January 3, 1982) is an Iranian-American actress, model and writer. She has appeared on several television films and shows, including Madam Secretary. She was one of the judges of the TV show Persia's Got Talent, the Persian spin-off of the British talent show Got Talent, produced in Stockholm, Sweden.

== Early life and education ==
Nour was born to Iranian parents in Arlington County, Virginia, but is now based in Los Angeles County, California. She is of Lur descent. She attended George Mason University.

== Career ==
Nour is also a social activist and took over Ellen DeGeneres's Instagram on 1 October 2022 to share stories in solidarity with the Iranian people during the popular uprisings caused by the murder of Mahsa Amini.
