= Farzan Athari =

Iranian-Swedish actor (born 1984)

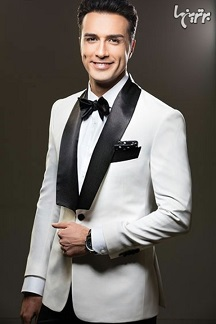
- Athari in 2016
- Born: 26 June 1984 (age 42); Tehran, Iran
- Occupations: Model, actor, TV host
- Height: 6 ft 2 in (188 cm)
- Website: farzanathari.com

Farzan Athari (Persian: فرزان اطهری; born 26 June 1984) is a Swedish Iranian, TV host, model and actor. He has worked in the fashion and entertainment industry in 23 different countries and collaborated with over 100 brands, he has also had leading roles in movies and hosted television shows.

== Life and career ==
Athari was born in Tehran, Iran. He resides in Sweden and has also lived in the United Arab Emirates. He has modeled for several well-known brands, including Diesel, Nivea, Nokia and Coca-Cola, as well as for publications such as GQ and Men's Health. In 2006 he became the first International model to sign a modeling contract in Iran.

He starred on a 2013 music video by Haifa Wehbe, a well-known Lebanese singer and actress, which has been viewed over 20 million times on YouTube. In 2016, Farzan Athari got into music himself just for fun and released his first single in Persian entitled Del Dele Irooniye on Spotify and Radio Javan.

In 2017, Athari was in a TV commercial for Betsson together with Måns Zelmerlöw. In 2019, he had the role as Florian in the famous Swedish TV series My Perfect Family.

He co-hosted the first season of Persia's Got Talent, an Iranian franchise of the British television show Got Talent, produced in Sweden in 2020/2021.

This year he was the host of The Fire Festival with over 35 million TV viewers arranged by the Sweden's National Touring Theatre at Skansen in Stockholm. The program was also broadcast live on YouTube and was shown several times on MBC. On live TV, he performed the song Together As One live on stage with the artist Jasmine Kara. The song that was originally intended for the Melodifestivalen was also released on Spotify as Farzan Athari's first English / Persian song.

== Controversy ==
In May 2013, Athari was arrested outside of the entrance of his apartment in the world's tallest building Burj Khalifa in Dubai, United Arab Emirates. Athari was charged with drug possession with the intention to promote and got a life sentence in court. He almost got death penalty when two out three voted for death sentence. But after he created an online petition where 65 000 people signed for justice in his case, his sentence got reduced to 10 years in appeal court. After an unchanged ruling for his sentence in supreme court, he came up with the idea to create a rap song, in which he asks Sheikh Mohammed bin Rashid Al Maktoum, who is the Vice President and Prime Minister of the United Arab Emirates (UAE), and ruler of the Emirate of Dubai for a pardon. He got a special pardon because of the rap-song after being in jail for almost 3 years. This has never happened before.
