= Sepideh (singer) =

Iranian-born singer (born 1975)

Sepideh سپیده
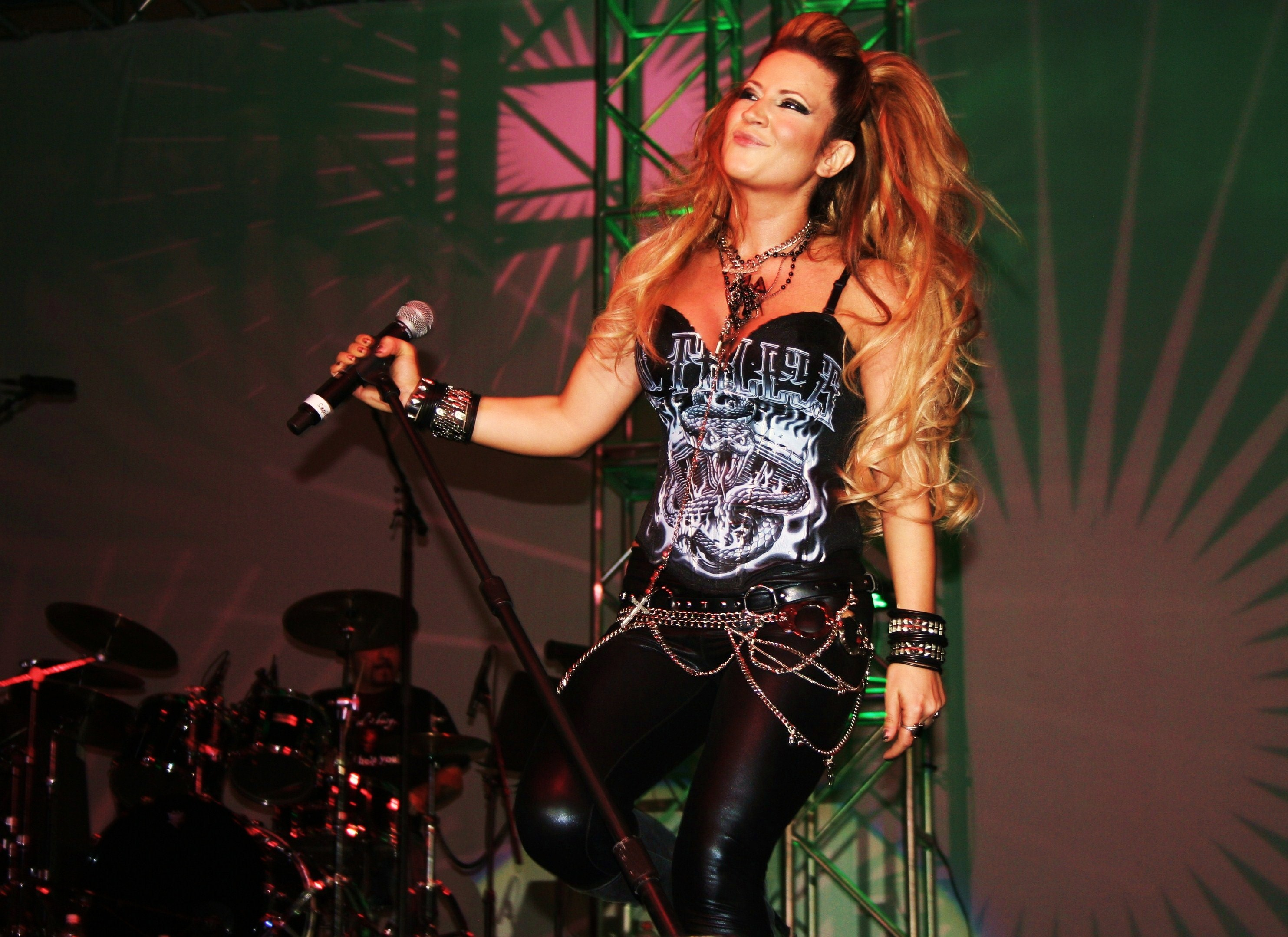

Background information
- Born: Sepideh Afshar; 14 January 1976 (age 50); Isfahan, Iran
- Genres: Persian pop, dance
- Occupation: Singer
- Instrument: Vocals
- Years active: 1998–present
- Labels: Caltex Records (1998–2007), Avang Music (2008–present)
- Website: sepidehmusic.com

Sepideh Afshar (Persian: سپیده; born 14 January 1976), known by the mononym Sepideh, is an Iranian-born singer. She has recorded and toured around the world multiple times, performing songs in multiple languages including Persian, English, Armenian, Arabic, Kurdish and Turkish.

== Personal life ==
Sepideh was born in Tehran, Iran. She is of Kurdish descent on her father's side.

She moved with her family to the Washington D.C. area in the late 1980s. She started singing in a band called Setareh while still in high school. After graduating, she joined another band called Mask. The band did shows all along the east coast of the United States for several years before Sepideh moved to Los Angeles, California in 1997 to pursue a career in music full time. She still lives in Los Angeles area with her husband.

== Career ==
After moving to Los Angeles in 1997, Sepideh got her break upon meeting the Persian music industry producer Shahbal Shabpareh. Sepideh started working with Shahbal in 1998 when he asked her to join as lead singer of the all-female Persian singing group Silhouettt (aka Silhouettte). Soon after, in 1999, the album "Beauty and the Beat" was released with Sepideh having recorded all vocals for the album. Silhouettt opened that year for Shahbal's band Black Cats, performing concerts around the world in support of the album. A few years later, in 2004, Sepideh released her first solo album entitled "Girl in the Mirror" with music producer Ramin Zamani. She followed that album in 2007 with her second solo album "No Fear," produced by Schubert Avakian. The book Soundtrack of the Revolution mentions that Sepideh is a "Shakira-esque pop singer". Although she has released no full albums since 2007, Sepideh has released multiple singles since then.

After the death of the Persian female music icon Mahasti in 2007, Sepideh was one of only four Persian female singers asked by the Tapesh TV Network to record and perform a tribute song in Mahasti's memory. The other singers involved in the project were Leila Forouhar, Helen, and Hengameh.

In 2016, Sepideh gave a live performance as the musical guest star for the finale of the Manoto TV talent show Stage.

Sepideh has developed a large online social media presence where she has accumulated millions of followers on various platforms like Facebook, Instagram, Twitter, and Telegram. In addition, her music and videos have garnered over 100 million listens and views on various streaming platforms like YouTube, iTunes, Spotify, Radio Javan, Bia2.com, and others.

== Discography ==
Albums

Beauty and the Beat

- Released: 1999
- Format: CD
- Label: Caltex Records
- Producer: Shahbal Shabpareh
- Singles:
  as part of Silhouettt
  No.	Title	Length
  1.	"Aroosiye Tou"	4:34
  2.	"Shaparak"	4:54
  3.	"Setareh"	4:52
  4.	"Hasood"	4:26
  5.	"Ham Koocheh"	4:02
  6.	"Barg"	5:29
  7.	"Eastgah"	4:10
  8.	"Aroosiye Tou (Instrumental)"	5:27

Girl in the Mirror (Dokhtare Tooye Ayeneh)

- Released: 2004
- Format: CD
- Label: Caltex Records
- Producer: Ramin Zamani
- Singles:
  No.	Title	Length
  1.	"Mikham Barat Bemiram"	4:05
  2.	"Keesh"	4:15
  3.	"Yadet Miad"	4:07
  4.	"Dokhtare Tooye Ayeneh (Girl in the Mirror)"	4:42
  5.	"Dele Divooneh"	4:11
  6.	"Kafshe Noghrehee"	3:35
  7.	"Ageh Besheh Chee Misheh"	3:46
  8.	"Keesh (Club Mix)"	3:42
  9.	"Medley"	1:46

No Fear

- Released: 2007
- Format: CD
- Label: Sepideh Music
- Producer: Schubert Avakian
- Singles:
  No.	Title	Length
  1.	"Be Ham Miresim"	3:23
  2.	"Baa Siyaasat"	3:10
  3.	"Vaaseh Chee"	3:43
  4.	"To Ham Nabaashi"	3:02
  5.	"Nagoo Aasheghetam"	4:05
  6.	"To Kee Hasti"	3:51
  7.	"Doos Daaram"	3:13
  8.	"Shab"	4:09
  9.	"Schubert On Piano (Nagoo Aasheghetam)"	4:08

Singles

Divaneh Shodam

- Released: 2008
- Format: Digital
- Label: Avang Music
- Producer: Schubert Avakian

Shoghe Parvaanegi

- Released: 2010
- Format: Digital
- Label: Avang Music
- Producer: Schubert Avakian

Nimkat

- Released: 2011
- Format: Digital
- Label: Avang Music
- Producer: Schubert Avakian

Nazanin

- Released: 2011
- Format: Digital
- Label: Avang Music
- Producer: Schubert Avakian

Dastaye To

- Released: 2013
- Format: Digital
- Label: Avang Music
- Producer: Schubert Avakian

365

- Released: 2013
- Format: Digital
- Label: Avang Music
- Producer: Schubert Avakian

Modara Mikonam

- Released: 2013
- Format: Digital
- Label: Avang Music
- Producer: Schubert Avakian

Zepyuri Nman

- Released: 2014
- Format: Digital
- Label: Avang Music
- Producer: Schubert Avakian

Zendegi Khoobeh

- Released: 2014
- Format: Digital
- Label: Avang Music
- Producer: Schubert Avakian

Nazdar

- Released: 2015
- Format: Digital
- Label: Avang Music
- Producer: Schubert Avakian

Labkhande Masnooie

- Released: 2015
- Format: Digital
- Label: Avang Music
- Producer: Schubert Avakian

Sharteh Booseh

- Released: 2015
- Format: Digital
- Label: Avang Music
- Producer: Schubert Avakian

Faseleh

- Released: 2016
- Format: Digital
- Label: Avang Music
- Producer: Schubert Avakian

Mimiram

- Released: 2016
- Format: Digital
- Label: Avang Music
- Producer: Schubert Avakian

Kabuki

- Released: 2019
- Format: Digital
- Label: Avang Music
- Producer: Schubert Avakian

Eshgh

- Released: 2021
- Format: Digital
- Label: Avang Music
- Producer: Schubert Avakian

Cheshmat

- Released: 2022
- Format: Digital
- Label: Avang Music
- Producer: Schubert Avakian

Aryaee

- Released: 2023
- Format: Digital
- Label: Avang Music
- Producer: Schubert Avakian

Cheghad Khoobeh

- Released: 2023
- Format: Digital
- Label: Avang Music
- Producer: Schubert Avakian

Eidee

- Released: 2024
- Format: Digital
- Label: Sepideh Music & Ashnic Music
- Producer: Schubert Avakian

Kura Kurd (collaboration with Aziz Waisi)

- Released: 2024
- Format: Digital
- Label: Aziz Waisi
- Producer: Aziz Waisi

== Awards and nominations ==
- 2017 – Best Iranian Female Act, daf BAMA Music Awards
- 2016 – Best Iranian Female Act, daf BAMA Music Awards (Nominated)
- 2009 – Best Middle Eastern Song, The JPF Awards (Nominated)

== See also ==
- Music of Iran
