= Faramarz Aslani =

Iranian singer (1944_2024) corresponding to Persian calendar 1323-1403

Faramarz Aslani فرامرز اصلانی
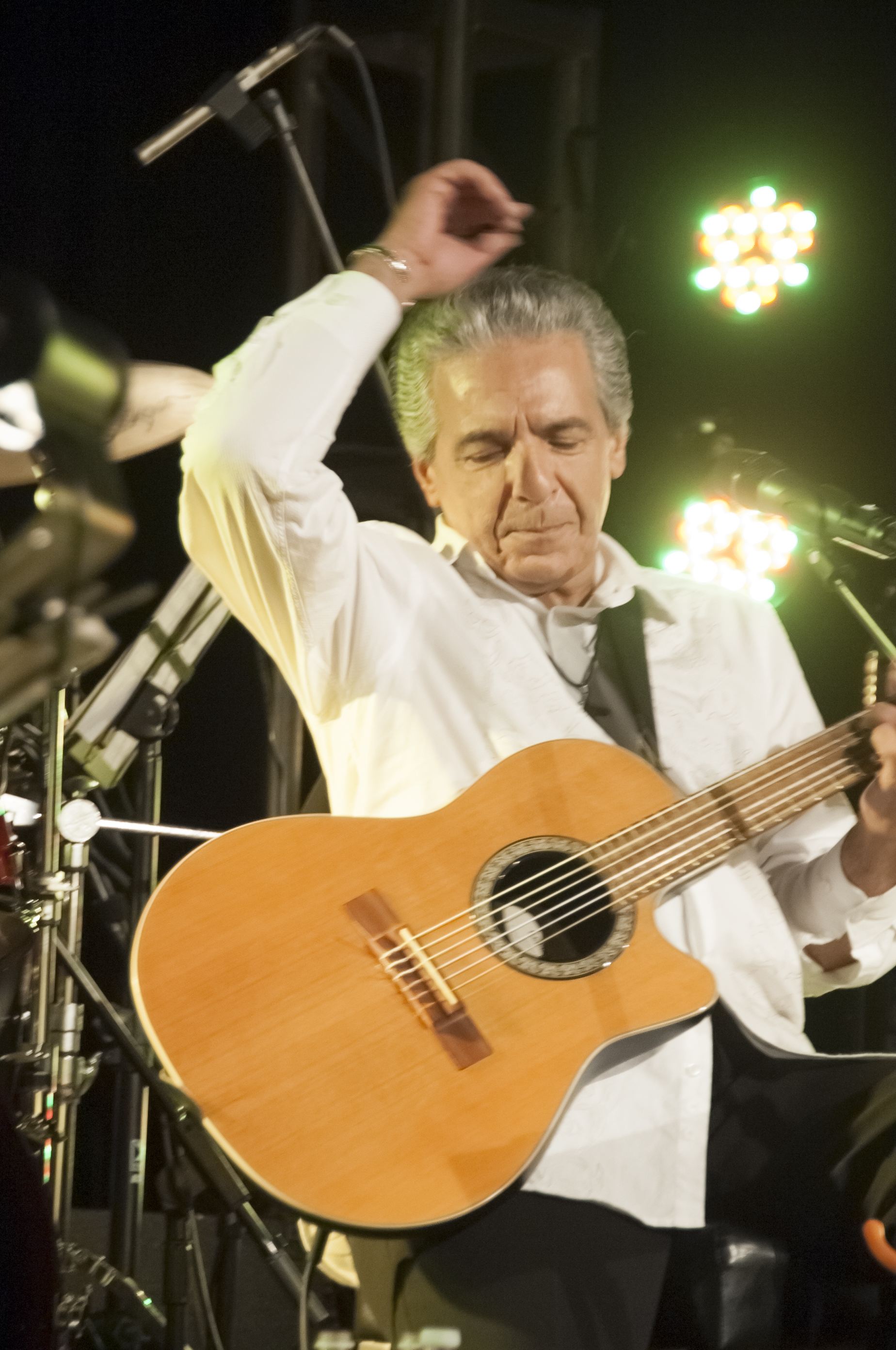
- Aslani in 2013

Background information
- Born: July 13, 1945; Tehran, Iran
- Origin: Iran
- Died: March 20, 2024 (aged 78) Maryland, U.S.
- Genres: Persian pop, Folk
- Occupations: Guitarist, songwriter, singer, composer
- Instruments: Guitar, setar
- Years active: 1977–2024
- Labels: Columbia Records (CBS), Caltex Records, Taraneh Enterprises Inc, Bamahang Productions, Pars Video, Pocket Ace Productions
- Website: faramarzaslani.com

Faramarz Aslani (Persian: فرامرز اصلانی; July 13, 1945 – March 20, 2024) was an Iranian singer, guitarist, composer, songwriter, and music producer. He was well known for his golden hits, such as 'Age Ye Rooz', which resonated across different generations.

== Biography ==
Faramarz Aslani was born in Tehran, Iran. He was a graduate of London University's College of Journalism and wrote for several Persian and English publications after his graduation in the early 1970s. Upon returning to his native country, he worked for the English-language publication Tehran Journal. He was spotted by the President of CBS Records International at a party in Tehran hosted by Pari Zangeneh. His first album, Occupation of The Heart, recorded for CBS Records International in 1977, has remained on the best-sellers chart since its debut. He also recorded a second album, Hafez, a Memorandum, for the same company. In this album, he wrote music for eight poems of Hafez, one of the most celebrated Persian poets and mystics.

After the 1979 revolution in Iran, he moved back to England with his family, where he worked both as a journalist and a musician. Aslani had two daughters, Phaedra and Roxana, who are both artists, from his first marriage to actress and author, Marilyn Aslani. His first tour of the United States began in 1992 when he opened at the Shrine Auditorium and was received by an excited audience. About his latest album, he said: "these songs are the addition of all the sweet and sorrowful memories of my life." In 2010, Aslani released his first album since 1999 titled The Third Line (Khatte Sevvom), in his first collaboration with independent record label Bamahang Productions.

On March 3, 2024, Aslani announced on his Instagram page that he had been diagnosed with cancer and had to undergo treatment in the new year. He died of cancer at a hospital in Maryland, U.S., on March 20, 2024, at the age of 78.

== Music career ==
In his second album, Hafez, A Memorandum, he wrote music based on eight poems of Hafez, Iran's most famous classical poet. In his last years, he released two albums, Rouza ye Taraneh o Andouh (Days of Song and Sorrow) and Khatt-e Sevvom (The Third Line).

He also collaborated with several other Iranian artists, on various albums. Rumi, The Beloved Is Here, was a collaboration with Dariush Eghbali and Ramesh. That album is an ode to the great poet and mystic, Rumi. Aslani also featured on Shahrzad Sepanlou's album, Yealbum he (One Day) in the song "Maa" (Us). In 2011, Dariush Eghbali and Faramarz Aslani came together again to sing a duet, "Divar" (Wall), as they began their year-and-a-half duet world tour, called The Legends Concert; which took them to 28 cities, from the Far East to the Middle East, to Europe and North America. He was a judge on Persian Talent Show.

== Discography ==
=== Studio albums ===
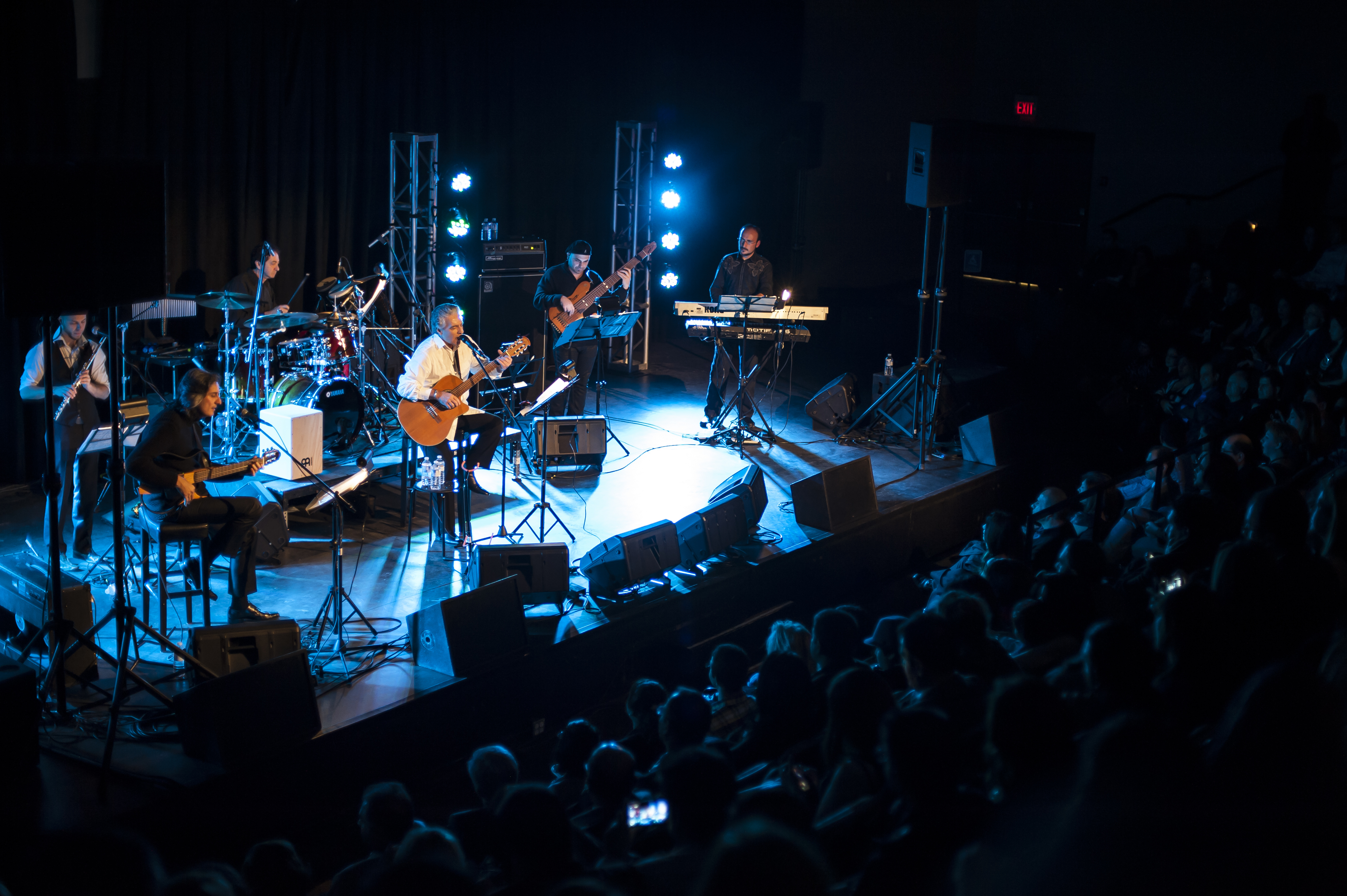
Faramarz Aslani in a concert in Calgary, Canada, Nov. 2013

- Occupation of The Heart 1977 Columbia Records (CBS)
- Hafez, a Memorandum 1978 Columbia Records (CBS)
- Days of Songs & Sorrow 1999 Caltex Records
- The Beloved Is Here 2002 DBF Records
- The Third Line 2010 Bamahang Productions.
- Midnight to Dawn 2017

=== Singles ===
- "Soroude Karegar" 1979
- "Parastooha" 1998 (Ft. Faramarz Assef)
- "Ma 2010" (Ft. Shahrzad Sepandlou)
- "Age Ye Rooz 2011" (Ft. Dariush)
- "Ey Eshgh 2011" (Ft. Dariush)
- "Divar 2011" (Ft. Dariush)
- "To 2013" (Unplugged)
- "Do Dariche" 2014
- "Nakhab Koroush" 2018
- "Hanooz" 2020 (Romantic Version)
- "Hanooz" 2020 (Rhythmic Version)
- "Age Ye Roozi" 2021 (Ft. Erfan & Danny)
- "Yadist" 2021
- "Fardaye Azadi" 2022
