= Googoosh: A Sinful Voice =

2025 memoir by Googoosh

- Author: Googoosh; Tara Dehlavi
- Language: English
- Genre: memoir
- Publisher: Simon & Schuster
- English publication date: December 2, 2025
- Pages: 336
- ISBN: 978-1668067420

Googoosh: A Sinful Voice is a memoir by Iranian singer Googoosh, co-written with psychologist Tara Dehlavi. The book was published in English on December 2, 2025, by Simon & Schuster. The memoir chronicles Googoosh’s life and career, focusing on her artistic journey, personal experiences, and the impact of social and political restrictions on her work.

== Summary of plot ==
The book covers Googoosh’s childhood and rise to fame, her experiences with the conduct of government officials of the Islamic Republic and her imprisonment, her romantic relationships and marriages, her struggle with addiction, her departure from Iran, and her eventual return to her career.

== About ==
In 2003, Googoosh requested Homa Sarshar to write her autobiography; however, due to Googoosh’s concert schedule and professional activities, the project did not materialize at that time. Years later, according to Googoosh, Tara Dehlavi—the daughter of Parto Dehlavi, a close friend of Googoosh—encouraged her to write her life story for a non-Iranian audience. Googoosh agreed to the project due to her close relationship with Parto and Tara. For a period of time, at Parto Dehlavi’s residence in Paris, Googoosh recounted her life story to Tara Dehlavi, who recorded her narration. After the manuscript was completed by Tara Dehlavi and its accuracy was confirmed by Googoosh, the book was entrusted to Homa Sarshar for translation into Persian.

An official Persian translation by Homa Sarshar of the book was released later in December 2025.
