= The Voice Persia =

Iranian reality talent show

- Genre: Talent show
- Created by: John de Mol
- Directed by: Soroush Mehrani
- Presented by: Hamed Nikpay
- Judges: Leila Forouhar; Bijan Mortazavi; Sogand Soheili; Kamyar Ahmadzadeh
- Original language: Persian
- No. of seasons: 1

Production
- Producer: Soroush Mehrani
- Production locations: Stockholm, Sweden

Original release
- Network: MBC Persia
- Release: 2 February – 17 March 2023

The Voice Persia (Persian: صدای برتر) is the Persian-language Iranian version of the reality singing competition The Voice, broadcast on MBC Persia. Filmed in Stockholm, Sweden, the series is produced by Soroush Mehrani and aimed at Persian-speaking contestants across the Iranian diaspora, and is judged by Leila Forouhar, Bijan Mortazavi, Sogand Soheili, and Kamyar Ahmadzadeh.

The first season began airing in February 2023 on MBC Persia and was recorded in Stockholm, Sweden a year prior. The season one finale aired on 17 March 2023 with the grand prize of USD 50,000 and a record deal with Platinum Records.

== Main version ==
Team Kamyar Ahmadzadeh
Team Leila Forouhar
Team Bijan Mortazavi
Team Sogand Soheili

Season	First aired	Last aired	Winner	Runners-up			Winning coach	Presenter	Coaches (chair's order)			
Season	First aired	Last aired	Winner	Runners-up			Winning coach	Presenter	1	2	3	4
1	2 Feb 2023	17 Mar 2023	Amin Yahyazadeh	Fernam Tokli	Ida Rastgo	Kian	Bijan Mortazavi	Hamed Nikpay	Kamyar	Leila	Bijan	Sogand

== Members ==
Amir Shoja
Amin Yahyazadeh
Pami
Aria Matin
Ghazal
Ayda Rastgoo
Saman Alibakhshi

== See also ==
- Persia's Got Talent
- Stage (Iranian TV series)
- Googoosh Music Academy
