= Persian Talent Show =

- Created by: King Records
- Presented by: Abed Rangamiz
- Judges: Shahram Shabpareh; Behrouz Vossoughi; Faramarz Aslani
- Original language: Persian
- No. of seasons: 2

Production
- Production location: Dubai

Original release
- Network: GLWiZ
- Release: February 4, 2014

Persian Talent Show is a reality television show competition that searches for the most talented acts across the Iranian diaspora. It is a talent show that features singers, dancers, magicians, comedians, and other performers of all ages. The program is broadcast internationally on the GLWiZ program, and is judged by Shahram Shabpareh, Behrouz Vossoughi and Faramarz Aslani. The first couple of seasons have been aired from Dubai with plans to expand to locations in Europe and North America.

== See also ==
- Persia's Got Talent
