= Marjan Television Network =

Persian-language television network

Marjan Television Network Ltd
- Type: Private
- Industry: Television, Media
- Founded: 2009
- Founder: Kayvan Abbassi, Marjan Abbassi
- Defunct: 2024
- Fate: Liquidated
- Successor: WizeWorx Media
- Headquarters: London, United Kingdom
- Key people: Kayvan Abbassi; Founder & former CEO
- Number of employees: 100+ (2014)

Marjan Television Network is a TV company owned by Manoto, a Persian-language TV channel. Based in London, it was established in 2009 as a platform from which to develop and launch a series of new television channels that would turn out content for a Persian-speaking audience.

Kayvan and Marjan Abbassi, the UK-based Iranian couple who launched Marjan TV, in 2009, stay out of the media spotlight. They and other Marjan TV officials declined to comment for this story despite repeated requests for interviews.
