= Mousa Qorbani =

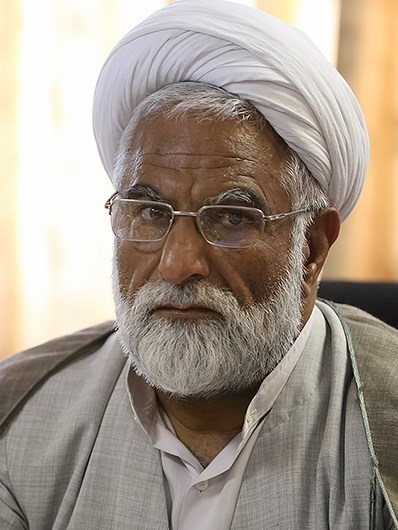
Image of Moosa Ghorbani

Hojjatol-Islam Mousa Qorbani is a Conservative Islamic mullah who serves (as of 2007) as the presiding board member in the Islamic Consultative Assembly in the Islamic Republic of Iran. He is elected by people of Qaen (in Southern Khorasan) as the member of parliament.
