= Ali Mohammad Ghorbani =

Iranian reformist

Ali Mohammad Ghorbani is an Iranian reformist. He is the leader of the Reformist Front Coordination Council.
