= Persia's Got Talent =

Iranian reality television talent show

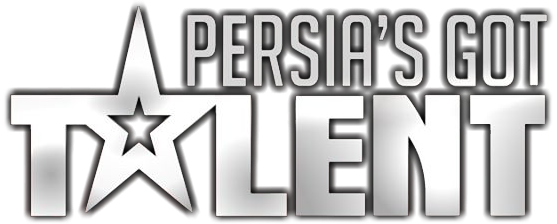
- Created by: Simon Cowell
- Presented by: Farzan Athari; Tara Grammy
- Judges: Ebi; Arash; Mahnaz Afshar; Nazanin Nour
- Country of origin: Multiple countries (representing Iran)
- Original languages: Persian; English
- No. of seasons: 1
- No. of episodes: 11

Production
- Producer: Arash Sobhani
- Production location: Sweden
- Production company: Fremantle

Original release
- Network: MBC Persia (Middle East Broadcasting Center)
- Release: 31 January 2020 – present

Related
- Other Got Talent shows

Persia's Got Talent (Persian: پرشیاز گات تلنت) (often abbreviated to PGT) is a spin-off of the British talent show Got Talent aimed at Persian-speaking audiences across the world, mainly in Iran (also known as "Persia"). It is produced outside Iran and is aired on MBC Persia, part of the Middle East Broadcasting Center, since 31 January 2020.

The first season was filmed in Sweden, which is home to a large Persian-speaking population. As in other Got Talent shows, competitors of Persia's Got Talent perform for judges and audience votes and the winner receives a cash prize. The contest is open to anyone speaking Persian.

The show is hosted by commercial model Farzan Athari and actress Tara Grammy. The judges are Iranian pop legend Ebi, well-known singer and Eurovision finalist Arash, well-known actress Mahnaz Afshar, and entertainer Nazanin Nour. In the end of the season, Navid became the champion, YasAmin became the runner-up and Negar came in third.

== Seasons overview ==
Season	Premiere	Final	Winner	Runner-up	Channels
1	January 31, 2020	February 19, 2021	Navid	Yasamin	MBC Persia

== See also ==
- The Voice Persia
- Stage (Iranian TV series)
- Persian Talent Show
