= Aziz Waisi =

Kurdish singer

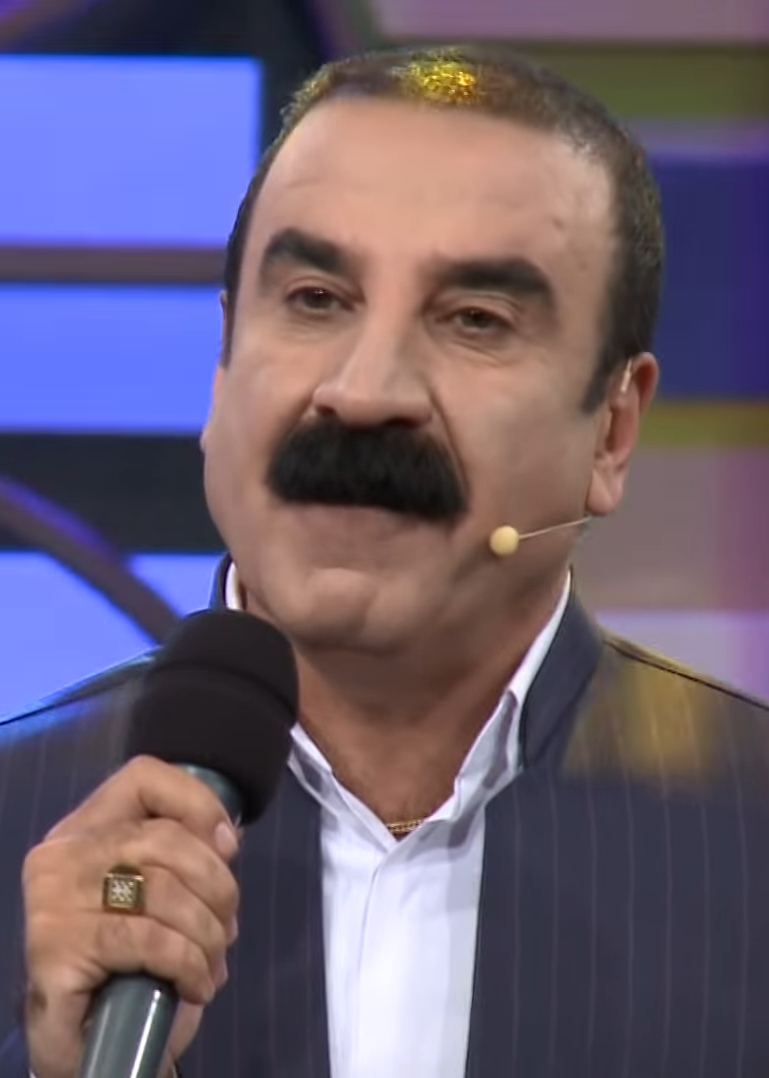
- Aziz Waisi in 2018
- Born: February 21, 1968 (age 58); Salase Babajani, Iran
- Occupation: Singer

Aziz Waisi (born February 21, 1968, in Salasi Bawajani). Is a Kurdish singer, mainly active in Iraqi Kurdistan but also Iran.

== Life ==
Aziz Waisi was born in 1968 in the district of Salasi Bawajani, which belongs to Kermanshah province in Iranian Kurdistan. He currently resides in Javanrud.

In July 2020, he contracted coronavirus and received treatment in a hospital in Sweden. In a interview with Kurdistan24, Waisi said that his health condition is stable and that he is put under quarantine, and added that the disease "is no joke", speaking from his former home in Kermanshah. He would later fully recover.

On October 15, 2022 he was detained by Iranian security forces after publishing a song about the fatalities of the Mahsa Amini protests, and posting a video on his Instagram page expressing support for the ongoing demonstrations in Iran stemming from the death of 22-year-old Kurdish woman Mahsa Amini.

== Music career ==
Waisi sings in Kurdish, and he has also released songs in Persian on several occasions. Most of his songs are based on Kurdish folklore and in a fast rhythm. He has campaigned in several parliamentary elections in Iraqi Kurdistan for the Kurdistan Democratic Party, the Patriotic Union of Kurdistan, as well as the Kurdistan List.

== Albums ==
A full list of his albums:

- Bemo, 2006
- Sahand, 2007
- Soma, 2008
- Dilan, 2009
- Sama, 2010
- Harzana, 2012
- Newroz, 2013
