= Raha Etemadi =

- Occupation(s): Producer, director, lyricist, TV host

Raha Etemadi (Persian: رها اعتمادی, born November 4, 1984) is an Iranian lyricist, producer, director, documentary producer and TV presenter, known for hosting talent shows Googoosh Music Academy and Stage on Manoto.

== Career ==
While completing his university degree, he started his career as a TV presenter by joining Iran online TV channel (www.bebin.tv). Following the success of Etemadi's work with this channel he then continued to work alongside Kayvan Abbasi in a new TV/satellite channel: Manoto. The channel became an immediate success. Etemadi was among the most notable staff in the channel and worked with Manoto from the channel's launch in October 2010 until 2017.
