= Mahmoud Ghorbani =

Iranian entertainment manager and businessman (born 1947)

- محمود قربانی
- Born: 17 December 1947 (age 78); Tehran, Iran
- Occupations: Entertainment manager, businessman
- Known for: Entertainment industry activities in pre-revolutionary Iran
- Spouse: Googoosh (m. 1967; div. 1972)
- Children: 1

Mahmoud Ghorbani (born 17 December 1947) is an Iranian entertainment manager and businessman, best known for his marriage to Iranian singer and actress Googoosh and his activities in Iran's entertainment industry during the 1960s and 1970s.

Ghorbani became a public figure after his marriage to Googoosh in 1967. During their marriage, he was involved in managing aspects of her professional career and was associated with Tehran's nightlife and entertainment scene before the Iranian Revolution.

== Early life ==
Little verified information is publicly available about Ghorbani's early life, including his exact date of birth and education. He was born in Tehran, Iran, and became active in the entertainment business during the 1960s, a period when Iran's popular music and nightclub culture were expanding.

Before becoming widely known through his relationship with Googoosh, Ghorbani worked in the entertainment sector and developed connections with musicians, performers, and business figures in Tehran's artistic circles.

== Career ==
Ghorbani was active in Iran's entertainment industry before the 1979 revolution. He has been described in various accounts as a manager and promoter involved with entertainment venues and artists.

During the 1960s and 1970s, Tehran had a growing popular entertainment industry, including nightclubs, cabarets, and live music venues. Ghorbani was associated with this environment and was reportedly involved with the management of the Miami Cabaret in Tehran.

Some sources have described him as the owner of the Miami Cabaret, while others have referred to him as its manager or operator. The exact nature of his ownership and business role requires further documentation from reliable independent sources.

== Relationship with Googoosh ==
Ghorbani married Googoosh (born Faegheh Atashin), one of Iran's most successful singers and actresses, in 1967.

At the time of their marriage, Googoosh was already becoming one of the most prominent entertainers in Iran. Their relationship attracted significant public attention due to Googoosh's popularity.

According to interviews given by Googoosh in later years, Ghorbani played a role in organizing aspects of her professional career, including efforts to expand her artistic activities beyond Iran.

The marriage lasted approximately five years and ended in divorce in 1972.

Ghorbani and Googoosh have one son: Kambiz Ghorbani. Kambiz Ghorbani later lived outside Iran and has occasionally appeared in media coverage related to his mother and family background.
