= Ali Ghorbani (footballer, born 1979) =

Iranian footballer

Personal information
- Full name: Ali Ghorbani
- Date of birth: November 22, 1979 (age 46)
- Place of birth: Iran
- Position: Defender

Team information
- Current team: F.C. Shahrdari Bandar Abbas

Senior career*
Years	Team	Apps	(Gls)
2004–2006	Malavan	52	(6)
2006–2007	Mes Kerman	23	(0)
2007–2011	Peykan	57	(6)
2011–2012	Gostaresh	2	(0)
	F.C. Shahrdari Bandar Abbas	0	(0)
- * Club domestic league appearances and goals as of 30 September 2010 ‡ National team caps and goals as of 8 May 2010

Ali Ghorbani (Persian: علی قربانی; born November 22, 1979) is an Iranian football player who currently plays for Gostaresh of the Azadegan League.

== Club career ==
Ghorbani joined Paykan in 2007 after spending the previous season with Mes Kerman.

Club performance			League		Cup		Continental		Total	
Season	Club	League	Apps	Goals	Apps	Goals	Apps	Goals	Apps	Goals
Iran			League		Hazfi Cup		Asia		Total	
2004–05	Malavan	Pro League	27	5			-	-		
2005–06	Malavan	Pro League	25	1			-	-		
2006–07	Mes Kerman	Pro League	23	0			-	-		
2007–08	Paykan	Pro League	11	1	1	0	-	-	12	1
2008–09	Paykan	Pro League	17	2			-	-		
2009–10	Paykan	Pro League	20	2			-	-		
2010–11	Paykan	Pro League	9	1	1	0	-	-	10	1
2011–12	Gostaresh	Division 1	2	0	0	0	-	-	2	0
Total	Iran		133	12			0	0		
Career total			133	12			0	0		

- Assists

Season	Team	Assists
2010–11	Paykan	1
