= Hooman Khalatbari =

Iranian-Austrian music conductor and pianist

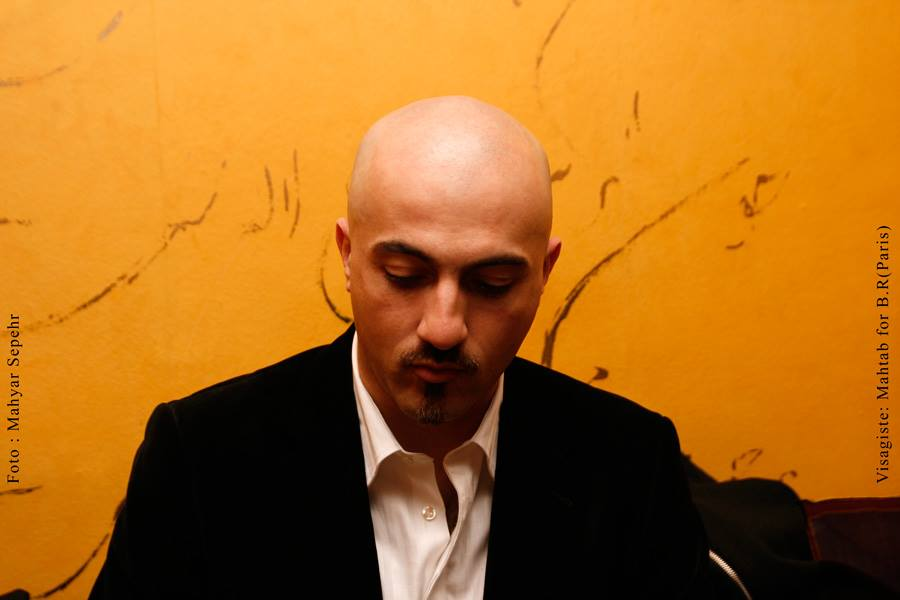

Background information
- Born: April 16, 1969 (age 57); Tehran, Iran
- Genre: Classical
- Occupations: Music director, choir and orchestra conductor, pianist
- Instrument: Piano

Hooman Khalatbari (Persian: هومن خلعتبری) (born 16 April 1969) is an Austrian-Iranian music conductor and pianist.

He started playing piano from age 6 and earned his B.Mus. from Tehran University of Art in 1996. Between 1988 and 1996, he was the principal pianist of Tehran Symphony Orchestra and Bahman Cultural Centre and assistant conductor of Tehran Symphony Choir and Tehran Youth Philharmonic Orchestra.

Khalatbari moved to Austria in 1996 and entered Kunstuniversität Graz to study choral/orchestral conducting and graduated with honors in 2006.

== Career ==
=== Conductor of Prague Philharmonic Orchestra and Its controversy ===
In the official website of Hooman Khalatbari, it has been mentioned that he was the principal conductor of "Prague Metropolitan Philharmonic Orchestra" in Prague-Czech for 2 years (2014–16).

Since 2016 he is the Honorary Conductor of “ Virtuosi Brunenses “.

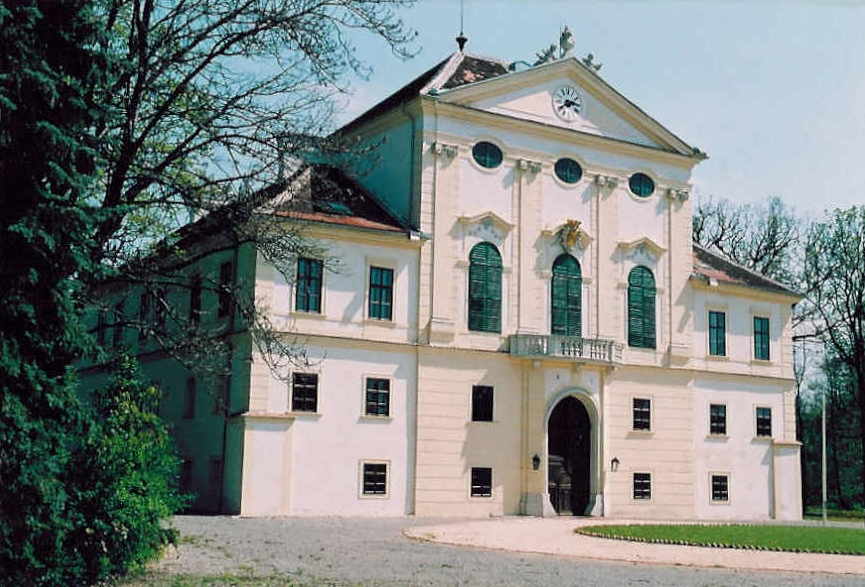
Exterior of Kirchstetten Castle - Hooman Khalatbari is the founder, music director and conductor of the Kirchstetten Castle International Music Festival in northern Austria.

=== Founder, Music Director and Conductor ===
From 2001, Khalatbari is one of the founders, music director and conductor of Kirchstetten Castle International Music Festival in northern Austria.

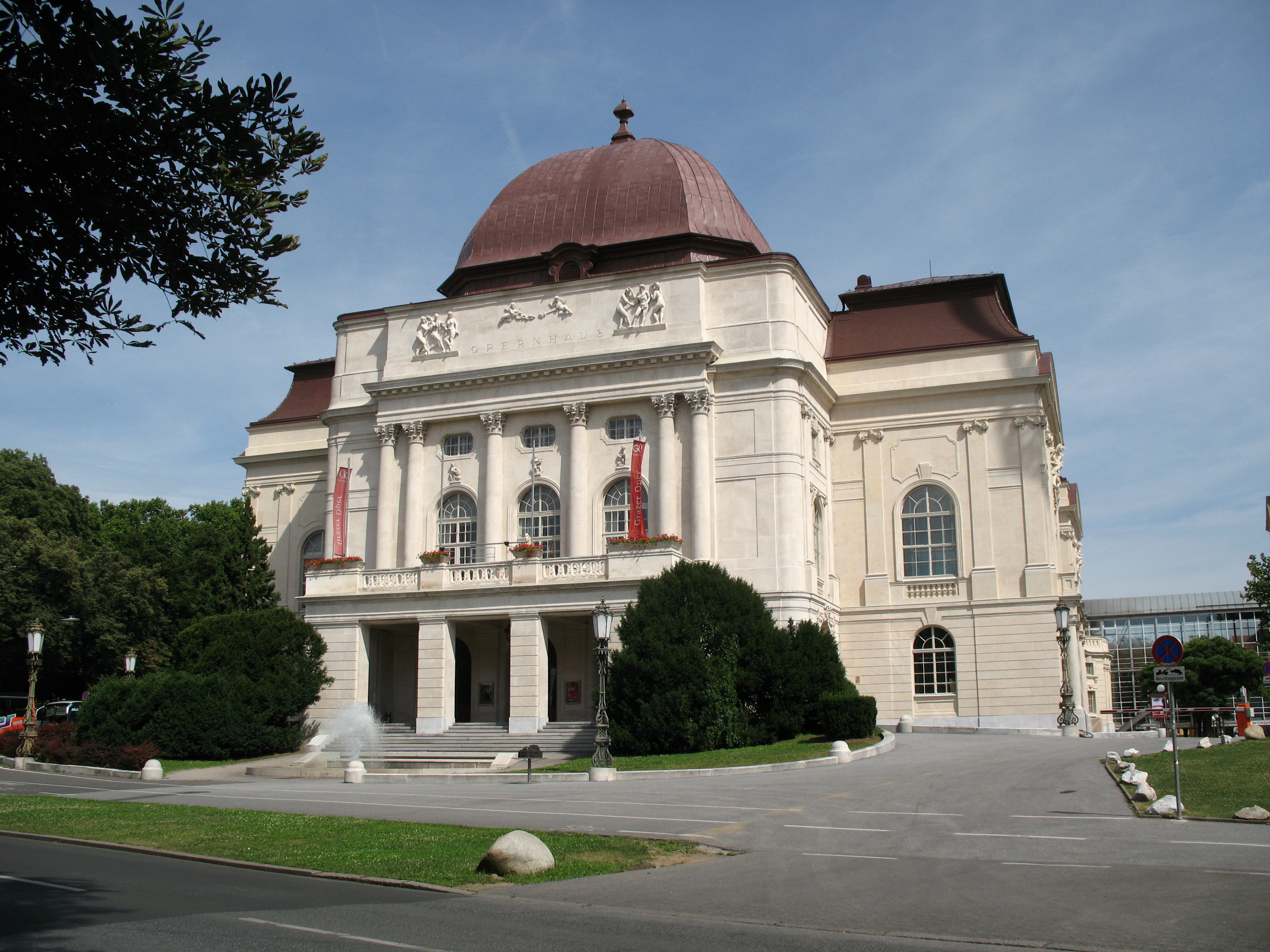
Exterior of Graz Opera House - Hooman khalatbari holds different positions in Graz Opera since 1999.

He has conducted the following operas:

- 2001 – Le Nozze di Figaro – Mozart
- 2002 – Die Zauberflöte – Mozart
- 2003 – Don Giovanni – Mozart
- 2004 – Il Barbiere di Siviglia – Rossini
- 2005 – Tosca – Puccini
- 2006 – Così fan tutte – Mozart
- 2007 – Die Entführung aus dem Serail – Mozart
- 2008 – La Cenerentola – Rossini
- 2009 – La Traviata – Verdi
- 2010 – Der Schauspieldirektor – Mozart and Prima la musica e poi le parole – Salieri + Classic unter Stars I (The Most Famous Opera choirs I)
- 2011 – Die Fledermaus – Johann Strauss + KUS II (The Most Famous Opera Choirs II)
- 2012 – Le Nozze di Figaro, Mozart + KUS III (Beethoven's Symphony No. 9)
- 2013 – Rigoletto, Verdi + KUS IV (Mussorgsky: Pictures at an Exhibition)
- 2014 – Don Giovanni – Mozart+ KUS V (Georges Bizet: Carmen / A Spanish Night)
- 2015 – L'elisir d'amore – Gaetano Donizetti + KUS VI (Carmina Burana)
- 2016 – Don Pasquale – Gaetano Donizetti + KUS VII (A Night in Italy)
- 2017 – La fille du régiment – Gaetano Donizetti + KUS VIII (A Russian Night)
- 2018 – Il Barbiere di Siviglia – Rossini (New Production) + KUS IX (Viva la France)
- 2019 – L'italiana in Algeri – Rossini + KUS X (Vienna Night)
- 2020 – (Event Cancelation Due to Covid 19)
- 2021 – Il signor Bruschino – Rossini + KUS XI (Beethoven Symphonie Nr. 9)
- 2022 – La Cenerentola – Rossini (New Production) + KUS XII (The famous ballet Melodies)
- 2023 – il Turco in Italia – Rossini + KUS XII (American Night)
- 2024 - I pazzi per progetto - Gaetano Donizetti + KUS XIII (the four seasons from Vivaldi with Cobario Ensemble)
- 2025 - L'occasione fa il ladro - Gioachino Rossini + KUS XIV (the famous Opera choruses)

=== Others ===
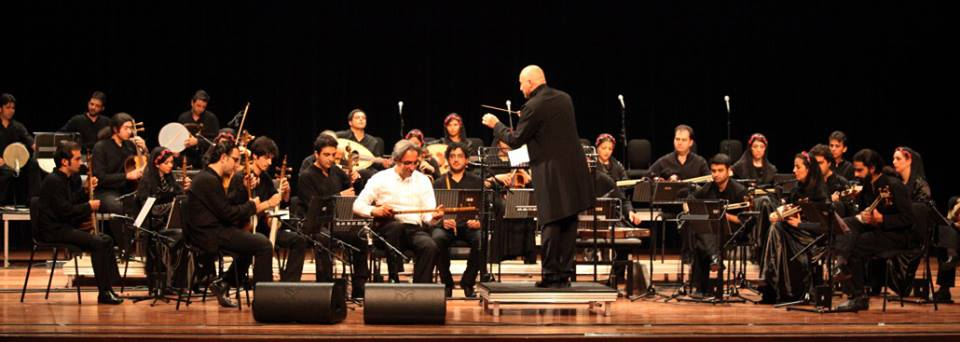
The world premiere of Hamid Motebassem's Simorq project; conducted by Hooman Khalatbari

Since 1999, Hooman Khalatbari has performed as a Conductor, Soloist, Chamber musician, Accompanist and coordinator in several Europa’s Cities, the USA, Canada, and Asia. His most recent performances were given as guest Conductor in Austria/ Vienna & Graz & Salzburg & Linz & Kirchstetten - Hungarian/ Budapest & Szombathely - Czech Republic/ Prague, Brno & Olomouc - Slovenian/ Maribor – France/ Paris – UK/ London - Canada/ Vancouver & Calgary and USA/ Houston, San jose, Chicago and at last in Zurich and Göteborg.

=== Conducting Iranian Orchestral Music ===
Khalatbari's conducting repertoire spans a wide spectrum of musical traditions, ranging from classical opera and symphonic, to atonal and contemporary music. Conducting the Simorq musical project, the world premiere of Hamid Motebassem with Homayoun Shajarian's vocal, is one of the brightest points in this range.

=== Shoosh Ensemble ===
Besides being the Music Director of “Klassik Festival Schloss Kirchstetten” and Honorary Conductor of “ Virtuosi Brunenses “ Orchestra in Brno/ Czech, Hooman Khalatbari together with Sina Alam founded "Shoosh Ensemble" in 2021 and he is currently the musical director of this quartet. "Shoosh Ensemble " quartet music genre is fusion and world music.

=== Albums ===
Hooman Khalatbari also has four albums in social media:

- "Baaraan Baaraaneh" with Hossein Yousef Zamani (1993) - Violin and Piano (Kurdish Melodies)
- "Ey Vatan" with Keivan Saket (1995) - Taar and Piano
- "Caspi" with Sina Alam (2022) Kamancheh and Piano (Mazandaran and Gilan Melodies)
- "Hoor" (2023) with Sina Alam - Kamancheh and Piano (Khorasan Melodies)

== See also ==
- List of Iranian musicians
- Keivan Saket
- Googoosh
