= Manoto =

Persian television network

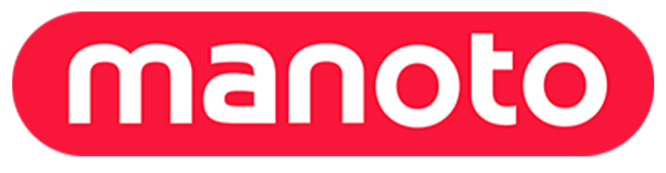
- Country: United Kingdom
- Headquarters: London

Programming
- Languages: Persian; English
- Picture format: 576i (16:9 SDTV); 1080i (HDTV)

Ownership
- Owner: WizeWorx Media Ltd.
- Sister channels: Manoto 2 (closed in June 2011)

History
- Launched: 28 October 2010
- Closed: 31 January 2024 (ceased satellite broadcasting)
- Former names: Manoto 1

Links
- Website: www.manototv.com

Availability

Terrestrial
- Oqaab (Afghanistan): Channel 51

Streaming media
- manototv.com: Watch live

Manoto (Persian: من و تو, lit. 'You and I') is an international free-to-air Persian language general entertainment channel launched in October 2010, owned by Marjan Television Network. It is based in London and its programs included documentaries, films, series, news and reports. The channel ceased satellite broadcasting on 31 January 2024, but continued to operate via social media platforms such as Instagram, Facebook, X, and YouTube. In 2025, Manoto returned as a subscription service internationally, and free-to-air in Iran via satellite.

== Overview ==
Marjan Television Network was established by Kayvan Abbassi and Marjan Abbassi.

Manoto's funding came from venture capitalists, according to a 2011 report on human rights and information access in Iran by the Foreign Policy Centre, a UK-based independent think tank. The report did not name the venture capital firms behind the station. However, many Iranian analysts believed that the channel was promoting Iran's ousted monarchy.

Kayvan and Marjan Abbassi, the UK-based Iranian couple who launched Manoto 1, in 2010, stayed out of the media spotlight. They and other Manoto 1 officials had usually declined to comment for their company and TV channel despite repeated requests for interviews.

== Viewership ==
Manoto's viewership rates were difficult to determine; however, anecdotal reports about the channel's ubiquitous popularity suggested that it had gained rapidly in market share to rival more established satellite channels like BBC Persian and VOA Persian TV. According to a BBC report in 2008, these channels may be watched by at least 30 percent of households inside Iran.

== Popular programs ==
=== Befarmaeed Sham ===
Befarmaeed Sham (Befarmāid Ŝām) (English: "Come Dine with Me"), is the Iranian version of the original British cooking show Come Dine with Me, in which participants host dinner parties and compete for the title of best cook and entertainer.

=== Googoosh Music Academy ===
In this program, Googoosh and her team of experts, Hooman Khalatbari and Babak Saeedi, help unknown Iranian performers maximize their talent in vocal music and singing, like the American program, American Idol. Hosted by Raha Etemadi, it was also launched in the British TV channel, Unique TV.

=== Manoto Stage ===
Manoto Stage was the biggest Persian-language talent show airing from London, England. It was hosted by Raha Etemadi and produced by Roxy Amini and Saber (Roxy Saber). Stage invited four Iranian music producers to coach, help, and judge the contestants: Reza Rouhani, Babak Saeedi, Hamed Nikpay and Sharam Azar (Sandi). Amir Hussein Eftekhari from Hamed Nikpay's group won the first airing of the show with a $50,000 prize. In addition, Stage brought in several famous musical guest stars to perform live on the show, including Aref, Afshin, Sepideh, Ava Bahram and Shahab Tiam.

=== Miss World and Miss Universe ===
Miss World and Miss Universe, both are part of the Big Four international beauty pageants, were shown on Manoto TV every year since 2011.

=== Manoto Plus ===
For one hour a day, five days a week this prime time magazine-style program, produced by Kasra Ghiassi and hosted by Sahar Sagharchi and Shaho Falahi, looked at topical stories from around the world. With some in-depth segments, as well as more light-hearted material, the show attracted big-name Iranian celebrity guests and a loyal following. Vahid Mahdavi presenting short reports all around the world and Lola Yeganeh Ameri presenting and producing the fashion content for the live show as well covering fashion, beauty, and culture topics around the world.
