= History of Topps baseball cards =

The history of Topps baseball cards can be traced to 1951 when the company released its first baseball card set. Topps had been founded in 1938 by four brothers, Abram, Ira, Philip and Joseph Shorin.

In 2009, Topps became the first official baseball card of MLB in over 30 years. The first product to fall under the deal was 2010 Topps Baseball Series One. The deal gave Topps exclusivity for the use of MLB and club trademarks and logos on cards, stickers and some other products featuring Major League players. The exclusive deal was extended in 2013, then extended again in 2018. It is currently scheduled to go through at least 2025.

In the 2010s, Topps was the only baseball card manufacturer that had a license with Major League Baseball. After Topps lost the license to Fanatics, Inc. in 2022, Fanatics acquired Topps.

== Beginnings and consolidation ==
Topps was founded in 1938 by four brothers, Abram, Ira, Philip and Joseph Shorin. The roots of Topps can be traced to American Leaf. Ira, Philip, and Joseph decided to focus on a new product while taking advantage of the company's existing distribution channels. To do this, they relaunched the company as Topps, with the name meant to indicate that it would be "tops" in its field. The chosen field was the manufacture of chewing gum.

At the time, chewing gum was still a relative novelty sold in individual pieces. Topps' most successful early product was Bazooka bubble gum, which was packaged with a small comic on the wrapper. Starting in 1950, the company decided to try increasing gum sales by packaging them together with trading cards featuring the Western film character Hopalong Cassidy (William Boyd); at the time Boyd, as one of the biggest stars of early television, was featured in newspaper articles and on magazine covers, along with a significant amount of "Hoppy" merchandising. When Topps next introduced baseball cards as a product, the cards immediately became its primary emphasis.

The "father of the modern baseball card" was Sy Berger. In the autumn of 1951, Berger, then a 28-year-old veteran of World War II, designed the 1952 Topps baseball card set with Woody Gelman on the kitchen table of his apartment on Alabama Avenue in Brooklyn. The card design included a player's name, photo, facsimile autograph, team name and logo on the front; and the player's height, weight, bats, throws, birthplace, birthday, stats and a short biography on the back. The basic design is still in use today. Berger would work for Topps for 50 years (1947–1997) and serve as a consultant for another five, becoming a well-known figure on the baseball scene, and the face of Topps to Major League baseball players, whom he signed up annually and paid in merchandise, like refrigerators and carpeting.

The Shorins, in recognition of his negotiation abilities, sent Sy to London in 1964 to negotiate the rights for Topps to produce Beatles trading cards. They also tried hockey. Arriving without an appointment, Sy succeeded by speaking in Yiddish to Brian Epstein, the Beatles' manager.

Berger hired a garbage scow to remove leftover boxes of 1952 baseball cards that had been stored in their warehouse and rode with them as a tugboat pulled them off of the Jersey Shore. The cards were then unceremoniously dumped into the Atlantic Ocean. They included Mickey Mantle's first Topps card, the most valuable card of the modern era. No one at the time, of course, knew the collectors' value that the cards would one day attain. On August 28, 2022, the Mickey Mantle baseball card (Topps; #311; SGC MT 9.5) was sold for $12.600 million.

== Entry into the baseball card market ==
In 1951, Topps produced its first baseball cards in two different sets known today as Red Backs and Blue Backs. Each set contained 52 cards, like a deck of playing cards, and in fact the cards could be used to play a game that would simulate the events of a baseball game. Also like playing cards, the cards had rounded corners and were blank on one side, which was colored either red or blue (hence the names given to these sets). The other side featured the portrait of a player within a baseball diamond in the center, and in opposite corners a picture of a baseball together with the event for that card, such as "fly out" or "single."

Topps changed its approach in 1952, this time creating a much larger (407 total) set of baseball cards and packaging them with its signature product, bubble gum. The company also decided that its playing card model was too small (2 inches by 2 5/8 inches) and changed the dimensions to 2 5/8 inches by 3 3/4 inches with square corners. The cards now had a color portrait on one side, with statistical and biographical information on the other. This set became a landmark in the baseball card industry, and today the company considers this its first true baseball card set. Many of the oil paintings for the sets were rendered by artist Gerry Dvorak, who also worked as an animator for Famous Studios. In 1957, Topps shrank the dimensions of its cards slightly, to 2 1/2 inches by 3 1/2 inches, setting a standard that remains the basic format for most sports cards produced in the United States to this day. It was at this time Topps began to use color photographs in their set.

The cards were released in several series over the course of the baseball season, a practice Topps would continue with its baseball cards until 1974. Thus, cards from the last series of each year did not sell as well, as the baseball season wore on and popular attention began to turn towards American football. Thus cards from the last series (referred to as "high numbers") are much scarcer and are typically more valuable (even commons) than earlier series of the same year. Topps was left with a substantial amount of surplus card stock in 1952, which it largely disposed of by unceremoniously dumping many of the cards into the Atlantic Ocean. In later years, Topps either printed series in smaller quantities late in the season or destroyed excess cards. As a result, cards with higher numbers from this period are rarer than low numbers in the same set, and collectors will pay significantly higher prices for them. The last series in 1952 started with card No. 311, which is Topps' first card of Mickey Mantle, and remains the most valuable Topps card ever (and, as of August 28, 2022, the most valuable trading card of all). On August 28, 2022, the Mickey Mantle baseball card (Topps; #311; SGC MT 9.5) was sold for $12.6 million dollars. This 1952 Topps Mantle is often mistakenly referred to as Mantle's rookie card, but that honor belongs to his 1951 Bowman card (which is worth less than the 1952 Topps card).

The combination of baseball cards and bubble gum was popular among young boys, and given the mediocre quality of the bubble gum, the cards quickly became the primary attraction. In fact, the bubble gum eventually became a hindrance because it tended to stain the cards, thus impairing their value to collectors who wanted to keep them in pristine condition. It (along with the traditional gray cardboard) was finally dropped from baseball card packs in 1992, although Topps began its Heritage line, which included bubble gum, in the year 2001.

== Competition for player contracts ==
During this period, baseball card manufacturers generally obtained the rights to depict players on merchandise by signing individual players to contracts for the purpose. Topps first became active in this process through an agent called Players Enterprises in July 1950, in preparation for its first 1951 set. The later acquisition of rights to additional players allowed Topps to release its second series.

This promptly brought Topps into furious competition with Bowman, another company producing baseball cards. Bowman had become the primary maker of baseball cards and driven out several competitors by signing its players to exclusive contracts. The language of these contracts focused particularly on the rights to sell cards with chewing gum, which had already been established in the 1930s as a popular product to combine with baseball cards.

To avoid the language of Bowman's existing contracts, Topps sold its 1951 cards with caramel candy instead of bubble gum. However, because Bowman had signed many players in 1950 to contracts for that year, plus a renewal option for one year, Topps included in its own contracts the rights to sell cards with bubble gum starting in 1952 (as it ultimately did). Topps also tried to establish exclusive rights through its contracts by having players agree not to grant similar rights to others, or renew existing contracts except where specifically noted in the contract.

Bowman responded by adding chewing gum "or confections" to the exclusivity language of its 1951 contracts, and also sued Topps in U.S. federal court. The lawsuit alleged infringement on Bowman's trademarks, unfair competition, and contractual interference. The court rejected Bowman's attempt to claim a trademark on the word "baseball" in connection with the sale of bubble gum, and disposed of the unfair competition claim because Topps had made no attempt to pass its cards off as being made by Bowman. The contract issue proved more difficult because it turned on the dates when a given player signed contracts with each company, and whether the player's contract with one company had an exception for his contract with the other.

As the contract situation was sorted out, several Topps sets during these years had a few "missing" cards, where the numbering of the set skips several numbers because they had been assigned to players whose cards could not legally be distributed. The competition, both for consumer attention and player contracts, continued until 1956, when Topps bought out Bowman. This left Topps as the predominant producer of baseball cards for the next 25 years.

== Consolidation of a monopoly ==
The next company to challenge Topps was Fleer, another bubble gum company. Fleer signed star Ted Williams to an exclusive contract in 1959 and sold a series of cards that was centered entirely around him. Williams retired the next year, so Fleer began adding around him other mostly retired players in a Baseball Greats series, which was sold with bubble gum. Two of these sets were produced before Fleer finally tried a 67-card set of currently active players in 1963. However, Topps held onto the rights of most players and the set was not particularly successful.

Stymied, Fleer turned its efforts to supporting an administrative complaint filed by the Federal Trade Commission, alleging that Topps was engaging in unfair competition through its aggregation of exclusive contracts. A hearing examiner ruled against Topps in 1965, but the Commission reversed this decision on appeal. The Commission concluded that because the contracts only covered the sale of cards with bubble gum, competition was still possible by selling cards with other small, low-cost products. However, Fleer chose not to pursue such options and instead sold its remaining player contracts to Topps for $395,000 in 1966. The decision gave Topps an effective monopoly of the baseball card market.

That same year, however, Topps faced an attempt to undermine its position from the nascent players' union, the Major League Baseball Players Association. Struggling to raise funds, the MLBPA discovered that it could generate significant income by pooling the publicity rights of its members and offering companies a group license to use their images on various products. After putting players on Coca-Cola bottle caps for $120,000, the union concluded that the Topps contracts did not pay players adequately for their rights.

MLBPA executive director Marvin Miller then approached Joel Shorin, the president of Topps, about renegotiating these contracts. At this time, Topps had every Major League player under contract, generally for five years plus renewal options, so Shorin declined. After continued discussions went nowhere, the union before the 1968 season asked its members to stop signing renewals on these contracts, and offered Fleer the exclusive rights to market cards of most players (with gum) starting in 1973. Although Fleer declined the proposal, by the end of the year Topps had agreed to double its payments to each player from $125 to $250, and also to begin paying players a percentage of Topps' overall sales. The figure for individual player contracts has since increased to $500.

== The monopoly and its end ==
A semblance of competition returned to the baseball card market in the 1970s when Kellogg's began producing "3-D" cards and inserting them inside boxes of their breakfast cereals (originally Corn Flakes, later Raisin Bran and other Kellogg's brands). The Kellogg's sets contained fewer cards than the Topps sets did and the cards served mainly as an incentive to buy the cereals rather than being the intended focus of the purchase, as tended to be the case for cards distributed with smaller items like candy or bubble gum. Topps both took no action and made no move to stop them.

The Topps monopoly on baseball cards was finally broken by a lawsuit decided by federal judge Clarence Charles Newcomer in 1980, in which the judge ended Topps' exclusive right to sell baseball cards, allowing Fleer to compete in the market. That let both Fleer and another trading card company, Donruss, enter the market in 1981. Fleer and Donruss began making large, widely distributed sets to compete directly with Topps, with both companies' sets also packaged with bubble gum. When the ruling was overturned on appeal in August 1981, Topps appeared to have regained its monopoly, but both of its competitors instead began packaging their cards with other baseball items - logo stickers from Fleer and cardboard puzzle pieces from Donruss. The puzzles, created by baseball artists Dick Perez for Perez Steele, included Warren Spahn, Hank Aaron, Mickey Mantle and 12 others. Other companies followed later, but Topps remains one of the leading brands in the baseball card hobby. In response to the competition, Topps began regularly issuing additional "Traded" sets featuring players who had changed teams since the main set was issued, following up on an idea it had experimented with a few years earlier.

== Topps in the modern baseball card industry ==
While "Traded" or "Update" sets were originally conceived to deal with players who changed teams, they became increasingly important for another reason. In order to fill out a 132-card set (the number of cards that fit on a single sheet of the uncut cardboard used in the production process), it would contain a number of rookie players who both had just reached the Major Leagues and had not previously appeared on a card. They also included a few single cards of players who previously appeared in the regular set on a multi-player "prospects" card; one notable example is the 1982 Topps Traded Cal Ripken Jr. Since a "rookie card" is typically the most valuable for any given player, the companies now competed to be the first to produce a card of players who might be future stars. Increasingly, they also included highly touted Minor League players who had yet to play in the Major Leagues. For example, Topps obtained a license to produce cards featuring the U.S. Olympic baseball team and thus produced the first card of Mark McGwire prior to his promotion to the Major League level, and one that would become quite valuable to collectors for a time. This card from the 1984 squad appeared in Topps' regular card set, but by the next Olympic cycle the team's cards had been migrated to the "Traded" set. As a further step in this race, Topps resurrected its former competitor Bowman as a subsidiary brand in 1989, with Bowman sets similarly chosen to include a lot of young players with bright prospects.

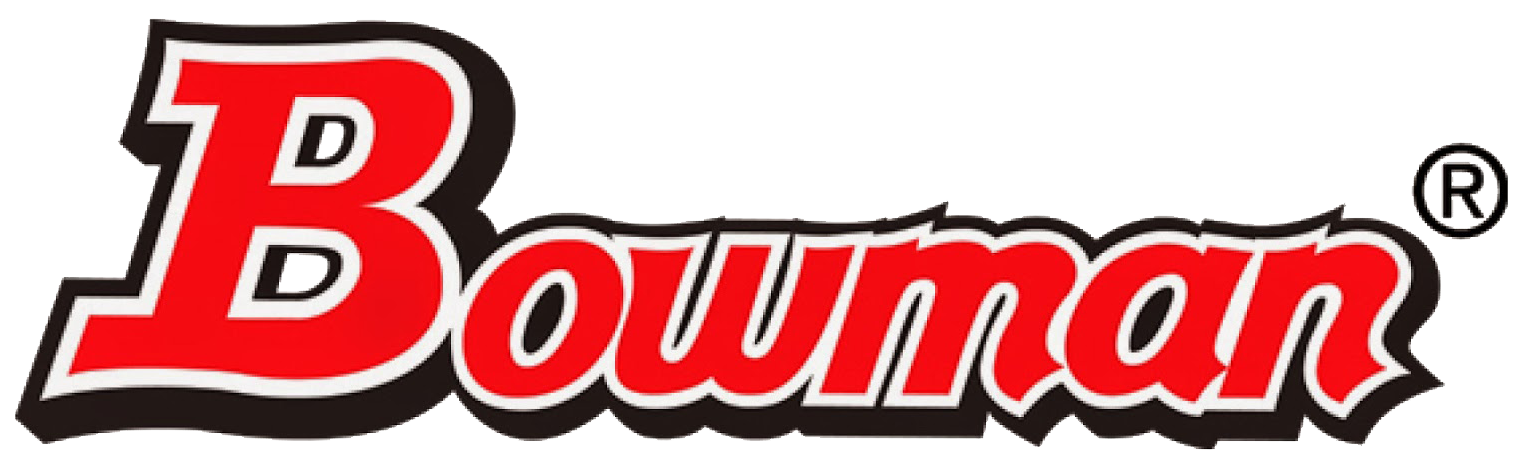
Topps resurrected Bowman as a subsidiary brand in 1989

Also beginning in 1989 with the entry of Upper Deck into the market, card companies began to develop higher-end cards using improved technology. Following Topps' example, other manufacturers now began to diversify their product lines into different sets, each catering to a different niche of the market. Topps' first attempt at producing a premium line of cards, in 1991, was called Stadium Club. Topps continued adding more sets and trying to distinguish them from each other, as did its competitors. The resulting glut of different baseball sets caused the MLBPA to take drastic measures as the market for them deteriorated. The union announced that for 2006, licenses would only be granted to Topps and Upper Deck, the number of different products would be limited, and players would not appear on cards before reaching the Major Leagues.

Although most of its products were distributed through retail stores and hobby shops, Topps also attempted to establish itself online, where a significant secondary market for sports cards was developing. Working in partnership with eBay, Topps launched a new brand of sports cards called eTopps in December 2000. These cards are sold exclusively online through individual "IPOs" (or "Initial Players Offerings") in which the card is offered for usually a week at the IPO price. The quantity sold depends on how many people offer to buy, but is limited to a certain maximum. After a sale, the cards are held in a climate-controlled warehouse unless the buyer requests delivery, and the cards can be traded online without changing hands except in the virtual sense.

Topps also acquired ThePit.com, a start-up company that earlier in 2000 had launched a site for online stock market-style card trading. The purchase was for $5.7 million cash in August 2001 after Topps had earlier committed to invest in a round of venture capitol financing for the company. This undertaking was not very successful, however, and Topps unloaded the site on Naxcom in January 2006. The amount of the transaction was not disclosed, but Topps charged a $3.7 million after-tax loss on its books in connection with the sale.

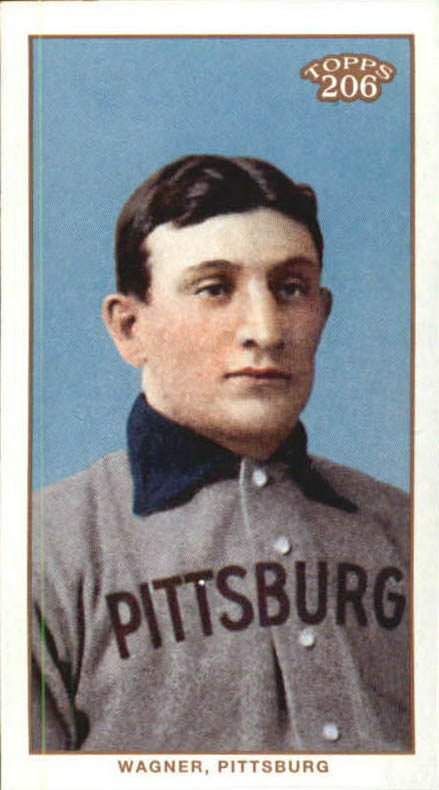
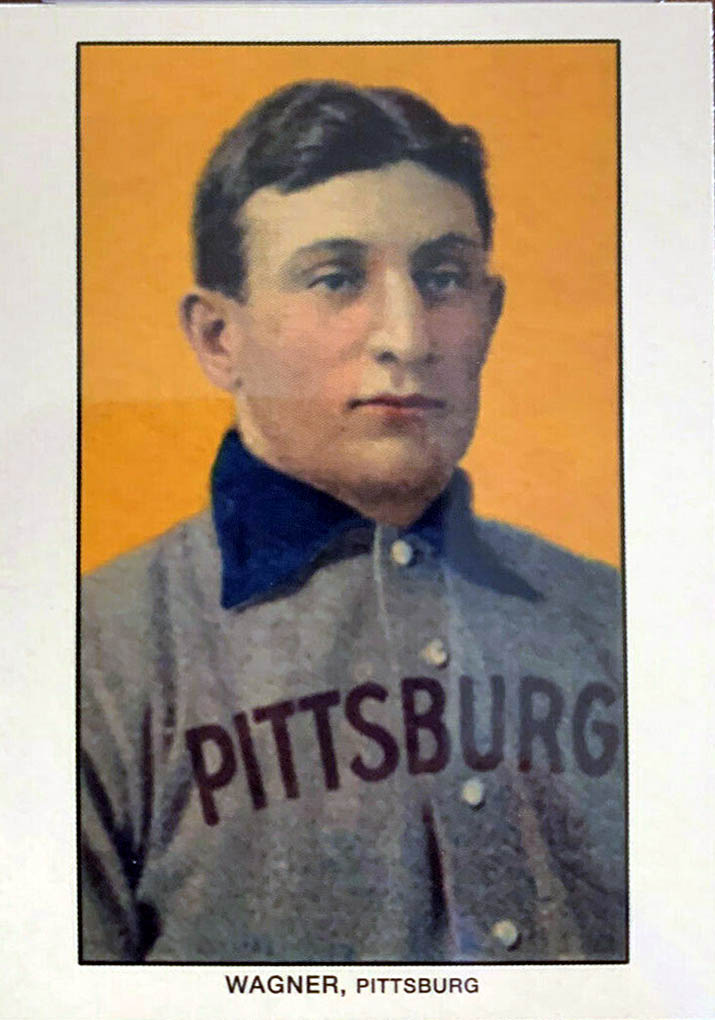
Two reissues of the iconic T206 Honus Wagner card by Topps, a 2002 edition with a blue background and the legend Topps 206 (left), and a 2019 reproduction of the 1909 original (right)

In 2002, Topps revived the T206 set originally released in 1909–1911 by the American Tobacco Company under the name Topps 206, with current players. That first revival included the iconic T206 Honus Wagner card, but with a blue background instead of the original orange one. A second revival was launched in 2010.

Topps grabbed collectors' attention early in 2007 when the new card of Yankees' shortstop Derek Jeter was found to have been altered to include an image of Mickey Mantle standing in the dugout and President George W. Bush walking through the stands.

In 2009, Topps became the first official baseball card of MLB in over 30 years. The first product to fall under the deal was 2010 Topps Baseball Series One. The deal gave Topps exclusivity for the use of MLB and club trademarks and logos on cards, stickers and some other products featuring Major League players. The exclusive deal was extended in 2013, then extended again in 2018. It is currently scheduled to go through at least 2025.

Again in 2020, the company released a new T206 collection divided into five different series, with the first series of 50 cards being released in May 2020. This collection, named Topps 206, included players from both the Major Leagues and the Minor Leagues. The fifth series was released in September 2020.

At the beginning of the 2023 MLB season, Fanatics, Topps and MLB announced that all MLB rookies would wear "MLB Debut" patches on their jerseys. The patches are worn during a player's first big league game, then removed, authenticated by the MLB Authenticated Program. The patch is then included in a one-of-one Rookie Debut Patch Autograph Card, to be randomly inserted into Topps baseball card packs during the year.

== Card design ==
Although Topps did not invent the concept of baseball cards, its dominance in the field basically allowed the company to define people's expectations of what a baseball card should look like. In addition to establishing a standard size, Topps developed various design elements that are considered typical of baseball cards. Some of these were the company's own innovations, such as their 1971 football set, while some were ideas borrowed from others that Topps helped popularize.

=== Use of statistics ===
One of the features that contributed significantly to Topps' success beginning with the 1952 set was providing player statistics. At the time, complete and reliable baseball statistics for all players were not widely available, so Topps actually compiled the information itself from published box scores. While baseball cards themselves had been around for years, including statistics was a relative novelty that fascinated many collectors. Those who played with baseball cards could study the numbers and use them as the basis for comparing players, trading cards with friends, or playing imaginary baseball games. It also had some pedagogical benefit by encouraging youngsters to take an interest in the underlying mathematics.

The cards originally had one line for statistics from the most recent year (i.e., the 1951 season for cards in the 1952 set) and another with the player's lifetime totals. Bowman promptly imitated this by putting statistics on its own cards where it had previously only had biographical information. For the first time in 1957, Topps put full year-by-year statistics for the player's entire career on the back of the card. Over the next few years, Topps alternated between this format and merely showing the past season plus career totals. The practice of showing complete career statistics became permanent in 1963, except for one year, 1971, when Topps sacrificed the full statistics to put player photographs on the backs of the cards as well.

=== Artwork and photography ===
Although the 1971 set was an aborted experiment in terms of putting photographs on card backs (they would not return until 1992), that year was also a landmark in terms of baseball card photography, as Topps for the first time included cards showing color photographs from actual games. The cards themselves had been in color from the beginning, though for the first few years this was done by using artist's portraits of players rather than actual photographs and until 1971, Topps used mostly either portraits or posed shots. The 1971 set was also known for its jet black borders which, because they chipped so easily, made it much more difficult to find top grade cards for 1971. The black borders would return for Topps' 1985 football set and its 2007 baseball set.

After starting out with simple portraits, in 1954 Topps put two pictures on the front of the card – a hand tinted "color" close-up photograph of the player's head, and the other a black and white full-length pose. The same basic format was used in 1955, this time with the full-length photograph also hand tinted. For 1956, the close-up tinted photograph was placed against a tinted full background "game action" photograph of the player. The close-up head shots of some individual players were reused each year.

From 1957 on, virtually all cards were posed photographs, either as a head shot or together with a typical piece of equipment, such as a baseball bat or baseball glove. If using such a prop, the player might pose in a position as if he were in the act of batting, pitching, or fielding. Photographs did not appear in sharp focus and natural color until 1962. However, that year also saw problems with the print quality in the second series, which lacked the right proportion of ink and thus gave the photographs a distinctly greenish tint. The affected series of cards was then reprinted, and several players were actually shown in different poses in the reprinting. Although Topps had produced error cards and variations before, this was its largest single production glitch.

In the absence of full color action photography, Topps still occasionally used artwork to depict action on a handful of cards. Starting in 1960 a few cards showed true game action, but the photographs were either in black and white or hand tinted color; these cards were primarily highlights from the World Series. In addition to basic cards of individual players, Topps sets commonly include cards for special themes, the 1974 tribute to Hank Aaron as he was about to break Babe Ruth's career home run record being one example. The 1972 set finally included color photographs, which were used for special "In Action" cards of selected star players. Thereafter, Topps began simply mixing game photography with posed shots in its sets.

Baseball artist Dick Perez was commissioned to paint art cards for Topps beginning in 2006. His art card series include Turkey Red and Allen & Ginter.

When used for the cards of individual players, some of the early action photography had awkward results. The photographs were sometimes out of focus or included several players, making it difficult to pick out the player who was supposed to be featured on the card. In a few cases, a misidentification meant that the player did not even appear in the picture. These problems diminished as Topps' selection of photographs gradually improved.

Before statistics, biographical information and commentary became the dominant element on the backs of cards, Topps also featured artwork there. This primarily involved using various types of cartoons drawn by its stable of artists. These appeared on card backs as late as 1982, but gradually declined in the prominence of their placement and the proportion of cards on which they appeared. In 1993, Topps finally managed again to incorporate player photographs on the backs as well as on the fronts of the cards, after some competitors had been doing so for a number of years.

=== Coping with updated developments ===
The pictures and the information on baseball cards sold during one season came primarily from earlier seasons, so Topps used various tactics to give its cards a greater sense of keeping up with the times. Before coming up with the idea of a "Traded" set, the company still tried to produce cards of players with their new team if they changed teams in the off season. This was sometimes accomplished by showing the player without any team cap, or by airbrushing out elements of the former team's logo on his uniform. Cards for rookies could also be prepared by airbrushing over their Minor League uniforms in photographs.

In one case, Topps got even too far in front of events, as in 1974 it showed a number of players as being with the "Washington Nat'l Lea." franchise, due to expectations that the San Diego Padres would relocate to the vacant Washington, D.C., market. The team designation was the only change, as no new nickname for the franchise had been selected. When the move failed to materialize, Topps had to replace these with cards showing the players still as the Padres.

On rare occasions, Topps has issued special cards for players who had either died or had been injured. The 1959 set had card 550 as "Symbol of Courage – Roy Campanella", with a color photo of the paralyzed former Dodger in his wheelchair and a black and white photo of him in his uniform inserted to the upper left. The 1964 set issued cards for two recently dead players, Ken Hubbs of the Cubs with a different "In Memoriam" front design compared to standard cards, and Colts pitcher Jim Umbricht's regular card with a special note on the back about his April 1964 death from cancer. In October 2006, Topps was preparing for its annual "Traded" / "Update" card release, which featured Cory Lidle in a Yankees uniform. After Lidle's tragic death, his card was pulled and then subsequently re-released with "In Memoriam" on its front.

== See also ==
- Topps baseball card products
