= Donna Bullock =

Donna Bullock may refer to:

- Donna Bullock (politician) (born 1978), American politician
- Donna Bullock (actress) (born 1955), American actress
