= Charles Kraft =

Charles Kraft may refer to:

- Charles H. Kraft (born 1932), American anthropologist and Christian teacher
- Charles Herbert Kraft (1843–1944), American businessman and one of the brothers who founded Kraft Cheese Company.
- Charles William Kraft Jr. (1903–2002), American judge

== See also ==
- Charles Wing Krafft (fl. 2013), American artist
