= William G. Stinson =

American politician

Member of the Pennsylvania Senate from the 2nd district
- In office November 18, 1993 – February 18, 1994
- Preceded by: Francis J. Lynch
- Succeeded by: Bruce S. Marks
- Constituency: Part of Philadelphia

Personal details
- Born: 1945 (age 80–81)
- Party: Democratic

William G. Stinson (born 1945) is an American politician from Pennsylvania who served as a Democratic member of the Pennsylvania State Senate for the 2nd district from 1993 to 1994. He was elected to represent the 2nd senatorial district in the Pennsylvania Senate in a 1993 special election; however, Federal District Judge Clarence C. Newcomer declared him the loser of that election after finding that Stinson had engaged in election fraud and ordered Stinson's Republican opponent, Bruce Marks, be seated in his stead. The latter took office on April 28, 1994.

The decision was notable because it shifted control of the state Senate from the Democratic party to the Republican party.

It was the first time such an event had occurred at the order of a federal judge.
