= Pennsylvania's 2nd Senate district =

American legislative district

Pennsylvania's 2nd State Senate district
Senator
Christine M. Tartaglione; D–Philadelphia
- Population (2021): 260,277

Pennsylvania State Senate District 2 includes parts of Philadelphia County. It is currently represented by Democrat Christine M. Tartaglione.

== District profile ==
The district includes the following areas:

Philadelphia County:

- Ward 07
- Ward 19
- Ward 23
- Ward 25 [PART, Divisions 02, 03, 05, 06, 08, 09, 10, 11, 12, 13, 14, 15, 16, 17, 18, 19, 20, 21, 22, 23 and 24]
- Ward 33
- Ward 35 [PART, Divisions 01, 02, 03, 04, 05, 06, 07, 08, 12, 14, 15, 16, 17, 22, 23, 24, 26 and 32]
- Ward 45
- Ward 53
- Ward 54
- Ward 55
- Ward 62

== Senators ==
Representative	Party	Years	District home	Note
Lindsay Coats	Federalist	1795 – 1797		
Maskell Ewing	Federalist	1813 – 1819		
Joel Barlow Sutherland	Democratic	1815 – 1816		U.S. Representative for Pennsylvania's 1st congressional district from 1827 to 1833
Abraham Bailey	Federalist	1815 – 1817		
Samuel Cochran	Federalist	1817 – 1819		
Daniel Groves	Democratic-Republican	1821 – 1825		
James Kelton Jr.	Federalist	1821 – 1825		
Stephen Duncan	Federalist	1821 – 1829		
Peter Hay	Old School Jefferson	1827 – 1829		
Samuel Breck	National Republican	1831 – 1833		U.S. Representative for Pennsylvania's 1st congressional district from 1823 to 1825
Joseph Taylor	Democratic	1831 – 1833		
George N. Baker	Democratic	1833 – 1835		
Francis Jacob Harper	Democratic	1833 – 1835		U.S. Representative-elect for Pennsylvania's 3rd congressional district in 1836 but died before taking office
James McConkey	Whig	1837 – 1837		
James Hanna	Whig	1837 – 1838		
Alexander M. Peltz	Democratic	1837 – 1838		
Charles Brown	Democratic	1837 – 1839		U.S. Representative for Pennsylvania's 1st district from 1841 to 1843. U.S. Representative for Pennsylvania's 3rd district from 1847-1849
Michael Snyder	Democratic	1837 – 1839		
Samuel Stevenson	Democratic	1837 – 1839		
John Benton Sterigere	Buchanan Democratic	1839 – 1845		U.S. Representative for Pennsylvania's 5th congressional district from 1827 to 1831
Thomas McCully	Democratic	1841 – 1842		
Benjamin Crispin	Democratic	1841 – 1843		
James Enue Jr.	Democratic	1843 – 1844		
Edward A. Penniman	Democratic	1843 – 1844		
John Foulkrod	Democratic	1843 – 1845		
Oliver Perry Cornman	Democratic	1845 – 1846		
Henry Lewis Benner	Democratic	1845 – 1847		
William Franklin Small	Democratic	1847 – 1848		
Thomas H. Forsythe	Democratic	1847 – 1851		
Thomas Sargent Fernon	Democratic	1849 – 1851		
Peleg Bahrows Savery	Democratic	1849 – 1851		
Levi Foulkrod	Whig	1853 – 1854		
Samuel G. Hamilton	Native American	1853 – 1854		
William Goodwin	Democratic	1853 – 1855		
Henry Charles Pratt II	Republican	1855 – 1856		
Thomas S. Bell	Democratic	1857 – 1859		
Jacob S. Serrill	Republican	1861 – 1862		
Jacob Elwood Ridgway	Republican	1865 – 1867		
Alexander Wilson Henszey	Republican	1869 – 1871		
David A. Nagle	Democratic	1875 – 1877		
John Cochran	Democratic	1879 – 1881		
Joseph P. Kennedy	Democratic	1881 – 1885		
William McAleer	Democratic	1887 – 1889		U.S. Representative for Pennsylvania's 3rd congressional district from 1891 to 1895 and from 1897 to 1901
Elwood Becker	Republican	1891 – 1897		
Israel Wilson Durham	Republican	1897 – 1899		Pennsylvania State Senator for the 6th district from 1897 to 1898. President of the Philadelphia Phillies in 1909
George W. Holzwarth	Republican	1899 – 1900		
Harry Gransback	Republican	1901 – 1905		
John Morin Scott	Republican	1907 – 1909		Pennsylvania State Senator for the 6th district from 1899 to 1906
Samuel W. Salus	Republican	1911 – 1937		
Alvin Evans Kephart	Republican	1939 – 1953		
Benjamin R. Donolow	Democratic	1955 – 1972		Senate minority leader from 1965 to 1970
Francis J. Lynch	Democratic	1973 – 1993		Pennsylvania Representative for the 195th district from 1967 to 1973
William G. Stinson	Democratic	1993 – 1994		Removed from office by order of the U.S. District Court on February 18, 1994 due to election fraud
Bruce Marks	Republican	1994		Seated April 28, 1994
Christine M. Tartaglione	Democratic	1995 – present		
