= Michelle Brownlee =

American politician

Michelle F. Brownlee

Member of the Pennsylvania House of Representatives from the 195th district
- In office January 4, 2011 – June 8, 2015
- Preceded by: Frank L. Oliver
- Succeeded by: Donna Bullock

Personal details
- Party: Democratic
- Spouse: John

Michelle F. Brownlee is a politician from the U.S. commonwealth of Pennsylvania. A member of the Democratic Party, she was a member of the Pennsylvania House of Representatives for the 195th district until her resignation after pleading guilty to felony conflict of interest charges on June 8, 2015.
