= Bruce Marks (politician) =

American politician (born 1957)

Bruce S. Marks

Member of the Pennsylvania State Senate from the 2nd district
- In office April 28, 1994 – November 30, 1994
- Preceded by: William Stinson
- Succeeded by: Christine Tartaglione
- Constituency: Part of Philadelphia

Personal details
- Born: March 14, 1957 (age 69) Clarksburg, West Virginia, U.S.
- Party: Republican
- Education: University of Pennsylvania (BA, BS, JD); University of Cambridge (LLM)
- Occupation: Attorney
- Website: http://www.marks-sokolov.com

Bruce S. Marks (born March 14, 1957) is an American attorney and politician who served as a Republican member of the Pennsylvania State Senate for the 2nd district from 1994 to 1995.

== Early life ==
Marks was born in Clarksburg, West Virginia.

== Education ==
Marks attended University of Pennsylvania where he graduated cum laude with bachelor's degrees in economics and Russian. He also studied Russian at the Pushkin Institute in Moscow, Russia, in 1980. Marks also received a JD from the Law School of the University of Pennsylvania cum laude, and an L.L.M. from the University of Cambridge in 1984.

== Political career ==
Marks served as counsel to Senator Arlen Specter from 1985 to 1987, and then again from 1988 to 1989, before starting his own political career. In 1990, he ran for the Pennsylvania State Senate, and then returned to private practice before running again in 1993.

In 1993, he was nominated by the GOP in a special election for the 2nd district in the Pennsylvania Senate. In the initial as well as certified official results, he trailed William G. Stinson. However, on February 17, 1994, federal judge Clarence Charles Newcomer declared him the winner, stating that the campaign of Philadelphia Democratic Party had engaged in election fraud by soliciting votes door-to-door in Philadelphian minority neighborhoods. The decision was criticized as partisan by legal scholars and Democratic activists, as it invalidated all absentee ballots in the district, regardless of their validity. Critics pointed to Newcomer's history as an elected Republican and his appointment by Republican president Richard Nixon, as well as the fact that the district had not elected a Republican since 1953, and a sudden surge of Republican votes in a majority-minority district was statistically unlikely. This ruling gave Republicans control of the Pennsylvania Senate, as the 1992 elections had resulted in a tie, with Democratic lieutenant governor Mark Singel breaking ties.

Marks was seated in the Senate on April 28, 1994.

In 1994, Marks was defeated for re-election by Christine Tartaglione, who has served in the seat since.

== Electoral history ==
1990 Pennsylvania State Senate election, 2nd district
Party	Candidate	Votes	%
Democratic	Francis Lynch (incumbent)	28,203	50.77
Republican	Bruce Marks	27,352	49.23
Majority		851	1.54
Turnout		55,555	
Democratic hold			

1993 Pennsylvania State Senate special election, 2nd district
Party	Candidate	Votes	%
Democratic	William G. Stinson	20,518	50.57
Republican	Bruce Marks	20,057	49.43
Majority		461	1.14
Turnout		40,575	
Democratic hold			

1994 Pennsylvania State Senate election, 2nd district
Party	Candidate	Votes	%
Democratic	Christine Tartaglione	31,080	50.32
Republican	Bruce Marks (incumbent)	30,687	49.68
Majority		393	0.64
Turnout		61,767	
Democratic gain from Republican			

== Private practice ==
Marks started his legal career at Morgan Lewis & Bockius, where was an attorney in the Business & Finance and Government Regulations sections in 1984-85 and 1987-88. In 1990, after running for Pennsylvania Senate, he joined Spector Gadon & Rosen, P.C., where he became a partner in the litigation department and remained until 1998. Before founding Marks & Sokolov, L.L.C. in 2001, Bruce was founding member of Egorov, Puginsky, Afanasiev, and Marks, L.L.C. from 1998 through 2001.

== Trump lawsuits ==
In 2016, as a result of his connection with then-President Donald Trump arising from his 1994 campaign, Marks was engaged by the Trump campaign to defend a lawsuit filed by the Pennsylvania Democratic Party in federal court, stating that the Trump campaign and Pennsylvania Republican Party intended to engage in voter suppression targeted at minority communities in Philadelphia.

In 2020, Marks was engaged by President Trump's reelection campaign to advise on litigation related to the 2020 United States presidential election in Pennsylvania. Marks, along with Professor John Eastman, filed a petition with the Supreme Court of the United States challenging the 2020 election results based on false claims that the Pennsylvania Supreme Court illegally changed election law, resulting in the counting of sufficient illegal ballots to change the result and cost Trump the election. The petition contained no supporting arguments that were not previously dismissed by other federal courts and state courts, and contained no evidence of so-called 'illegal ballots'. The petition was dismissed, and both the Pennsylvania Secretary of State and Congress certified Joe Biden as the president-elect.
