= Bruce Marks =

Bruce Marks may refer to:

- Bruce Marks (politician)
- Bruce Marks (dancer)
