= Sy Berger =

American man who created the modern baseball trading card

- Sy Berger trading card issued by Topps in 2004
- Born: July 12, 1923; New York City, New York, U.S.
- Died: December 14, 2014 (aged 91); Rockville Centre, New York, U.S.
- Occupations: Vice-president of Sports & Licensing at Topps
- Years active: 1947–97
- Known for: Topps baseball cards
- Notable work: Co-designer of 1952 series

Seymour Perry Berger (July 12, 1923 – December 14, 2014) was an employee of the Topps company for over 50 years. He is credited as being the co-designer of the 1952 Topps baseball series, as is regarded as "the father of modern baseball cards".

== Personal life ==
Berger, who was Jewish, was born on July 12, 1923, on the Lower East Side neighborhood of Manhattan, to Louis (a furrier) and Rebecca Berger. As a boy, he collected baseball cards, traded them and won some from friends by flipping for them. He served in the Army Air Forces in World War II and later graduated from Bucknell University with an accounting degree. While in college, Berger met Joel Shorin, son of Philip Shorin, one of the founders of Topps.

Berger died on December 14, 2014, aged 91, at home in Rockville Centre, New York. He is survived by his wife of 69 years (Gloria Karpf Berger), three children, five grandchildren, and two great-grandchildren.

== Topps ==
Berger's first day at Topps was also the first day that Topps began to produce Bazooka Gum. In the autumn of 1951, Berger, then aged 28, designed the 1952 Topps baseball card set with Woody Gelman on the kitchen table of his apartment on Alabama Avenue in Brooklyn. The card design included a player's name, photo, facsimile autograph, team name and logo on the front; and the player's height, weight, bats, throws, birthplace, birthday, stats and a short biography on the back.

In an interview, Berger noted that the cards did not contain a reference to the particular year, because, he recalls thinking, "maybe if this thing is a dud, how are we going to get rid of the cards?" The basic design is still in use today. Berger would work for Topps for 50 years (1947–97), achieve the position of vice-president of sports & licensing, and serve as a consultant for another five, becoming a well-known figure on the baseball scene and the face of Topps to major league baseball players, whom he signed up annually and paid in merchandise, like refrigerators and carpeting.

At some point, allegedly in the early 1980’s, Berger began telling a story that has become hobby folklore. Berger claimed that: in 1960, because "nobody wanted the stuff" and Topps needed the storage space, Berger had the equivalent of “three garbage trucks full” of 1952 Topps baseball cards that needed disposal. What is important to the story as it relates to these cards is they were all high-series cards, the final group of 96 cards to complete the 407 card set, and they included the famous Mickey Mantle Topps rookie card, #311. This card is worth millions of dollars in the highest grade condition today. Berger claimed the cards were loaded onto a barge, the barge was tugged a few miles off shore, and the cards were dumped into the Atlantic Ocean. He also claimed he was present on the barge and oversaw the dumping. Evidence has subsequently revealed what is almost certainly the true whereabouts of these 1952 Topps high-series cards and casts great doubt that Berger's story was entirely truthful, particularly the part about dumping the cards into the ocean. In the mid-1980's, once it was discovered that Topps had given license and supplied the original printing plates for the printing of largely parallel sets of Topps baseball cards in Venezuela between 1959-1968, a group of sports card dealers went to Caracas multiple times to buy up the newly discovered 'Venezuela Topps' cards. They ran ads in the local newspaper and had people lined up to sell their cards, and many showed up with 1952 Topps high-series cards. The cards that allegedly were dumped were almost certainly the same cards that were shipped to Venezuela and sold there. Perhaps this happened around 1960 if we are to believe that date from Berger’s highly suspect story. To this day, those 1952 Topps high-series cards still occasionally turn up in Venezuela.

At 81, Berger was still busy in various activities, including advising Topps, representing his old friend Willie Mays, playing with his grandchildren and an occasional round of golf.

== Legacy ==
Since 1978, Berger was a member of the Society for American Baseball Research (SABR).

In 1988, he was honored by the National Baseball Hall of Fame.

He also earned his own baseball card, #137 in the 2004 Topps series called All-Time Fan Favorites.

Berger was inducted into the National Jewish Sports Hall of Fame on April 29, 2012, and acknowledged by the New York Senate for this attainment of success and personal achievement.

Berger was inducted into the Baseball Reliquary's Shrine of the Eternals in 2015.
