= Alvin Evans Kephart =

American politician

Member of the Pennsylvania Senate from the 2nd district
- In office 1939–1954
- Preceded by: Samuel W. Salus
- Succeeded by: Benjamin R. Donolow

Personal details
- Born: December 21, 1905 Ebensburg, Pennsylvania
- Died: January 6, 2008 (aged 102) Spearfish, South Dakota
- Education: Princeton University (BA); Harvard Law School (JD)

Alvin Evans Kephart (December 21, 1905– January 6, 2008) was a member of the Pennsylvania State Senate, serving from 1939 to 1954. His father was John W. Kephart, chief justice of the Supreme Court of Pennsylvania, and his grandfather was Alvin Evans, a member of the United States House of Representatives.
