= Pennsylvania House of Representatives, District 195 =

American legislative district

Pennsylvania's 195th State House of Representatives district
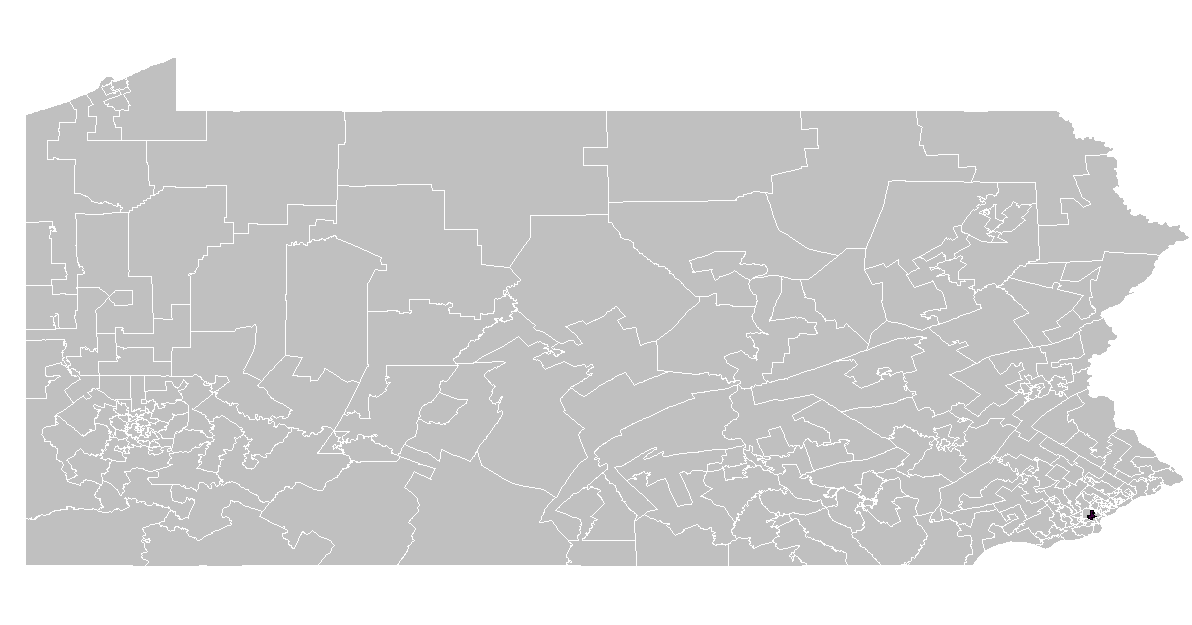
Representative
Keith Harris; D–Philadelphia

The 195th Pennsylvania House of Representatives District is located in Philadelphia County and includes the following areas:

- Ward 15
- Ward 24 [PART, Divisions 01, 02, 03, 04, 05, 09, 10, 11, 12, 13, 14, 15, 18 and 19]
- Ward 28
- Ward 29
- Ward 32 [PART, Divisions 01, 02, 03, 04, 10, 13, 14, 15, 16, 17, 18, 19, 20, 21, 22, 23, 24, 25, 26, 27, 28, 29, 30 and 31]

== Representatives ==
Representative	Party	Years	District home	Note
Prior to 1969, seats were apportioned by county.
Francis J. Lynch	Democratic	1969 – 1974		Resigned March 25, 1973
Frank Louis Oliver	Democratic	1974 – 2011		Elected November 1973 to fill vacancy
Michelle Brownlee	Democratic	2011 – 2015		Resigned June 8, 2015
Donna Bullock	Democratic	2015 – 2024		Resigned July 15, 2024
Keith Harris	Democratic	2024-present		Elected September 30, 2024, to fill vacancy
