= Frank L. Oliver =

American politician (1922–2018)

Member of the Pennsylvania House of Representatives from the 195th district
- In office November 15, 1973 – November 30, 2010
- Preceded by: Francis Lynch
- Succeeded by: Michelle Brownlee

Personal details
- Born: April 15, 1922 Philadelphia, Pennsylvania
- Died: February 1, 2018 (aged 95) Philadelphia, Pennsylvania
- Party: Democratic
- Spouse: Wilma Wooden

Frank Louis Oliver (April 15, 1922 – February 1, 2018) was an American politician who was the Democratic member of the Pennsylvania House of Representatives, representing the 195th District from a special election on November 15, 1973, until retiring from the House on November 30, 2010.

Oliver announced that he was retiring, after 37 years in the Pennsylvania House. He died in 2018 at the age of 95.

== Ward Leader ==
Oliver was the Ward Leader of the 29th Ward Democratic Executive Committee in Philadelphia from at least 1973 until his death in 2018.
