= Benjamin Donolow =

American politician (1917–1972)

Benjamin R. Donolow

Member of the Pennsylvania Senate from the 2nd district
- In office January 3, 1955 – November 27, 1972
- Preceded by: Alvin Evans Kephart
- Succeeded by: Francis Lynch
- Constituency: Part of Philadelphia

Personal details
- Born: May 24, 1917 Philadelphia, Pennsylvania, US
- Died: November 27, 1972 (aged 55)
- Party: Democratic

Military service
- Allegiance: United States
- Branch/service: U.S. Army
- Years of service: World War II

Benjamin R. Donolow (May 24, 1917 – November 27, 1972) was an American politician from Pennsylvania who served as a Democratic member of the Pennsylvania State Senate for the 2nd district from 1954 to 1972.

== Early life ==
He graduated from Temple School of Law in 1941. He helped supplement his tuition by working as a song and dance comic at banquets and bar mitzvahs. He served in the U.S. Army during World War II. After leaving the Army, he became a trial lawyer.

== Career ==
He was first elected to the Pennsylvania Senate in 1954 and served until 1972. He served as Chairman of the Appropriations Committee and Vice Chairman of the Judicial Committee. He served as Senate minority leader from 1965 to 1970. He served as a delegate to the 1964 Democratic National Convention.

He died on November 27, 1972.
