= Charles William Kraft Jr. =

American judge

Senior Judge of the United States District Court for the Eastern District of Pennsylvania
- In office November 11, 1970 – January 18, 2002

Judge of the United States District Court for the Eastern District of Pennsylvania
- In office August 12, 1955 – November 11, 1970
- Appointed by: Dwight D. Eisenhower
- Preceded by: Seat established by 68 Stat. 8
- Succeeded by: Clarence Charles Newcomer

Personal details
- Born: Charles William Kraft Jr. December 14, 1903 Philadelphia, Pennsylvania
- Died: January 18, 2002 (aged 98) Key Biscayne, Florida
- Education: University of Pennsylvania (A.B.); University of Pennsylvania Law School (LL.B., J.D.)

Charles William Kraft Jr. (December 14, 1903 – January 18, 2002) was a United States district judge of the United States District Court for the Eastern District of Pennsylvania.

== Education and career ==
Born in Philadelphia, Pennsylvania, Kraft received an Artium Baccalaureus degree from the University of Pennsylvania in 1924, a Bachelor of Laws from the University of Pennsylvania Law School in 1927, and a Juris Doctor from the same institution in 1930. He was in private practice in Media, Pennsylvania from 1927 to 1955. He was District Attorney of Delaware County, Pennsylvania from 1944 to 1952.

== Federal judicial service ==
Kraft received a recess appointment from President Dwight D. Eisenhower on August 12, 1955, to the United States District Court for the Eastern District of Pennsylvania, to a new seat created by 68 Stat. 8. He was nominated to the same seat by President Eisenhower on January 12, 1956. He was confirmed by the United States Senate on March 28, 1956, and received his commission the next day. He was succeeded by Judge Clarence Charles Newcomer. He assumed senior status on November 11, 1970. Kraft served in that capacity until his death on January 18, 2002, in Key Biscayne, Florida.

== See also ==
- List of United States federal judges by longevity of service

== Sources ==
Legal offices
| Preceded by Seat established by 68 Stat. 8 | Judge of the United States District Court for the Eastern District of Pennsylvania; 1955–1970 | Succeeded by Clarence Charles Newcomer |
