= Topps baseball card products =

Sets of collectible trading cards

Topps baseball cards
- Type: Baseball card
- Company: Topps
- Country: United States
- Availability: 1951–present
- Features: Baseball players

The Topps Company, Inc. has produced a number of different baseball card products during its entire existence. They originally started as a chewing gum company, using the baseball cards as a sales gimmick to make the gum more popular, but today it is primarily a baseball card company.

== Topps brands ==
=== Factory sets ===
Topps remains the only baseball card company today to still offer factory sets of their base brand. Their first factory set was offered in 1974 exclusively in the JCPenney catalog, but Topps would not begin releasing factory sets again until 1982. The 1982 Topps Factory Set is rare due to JCPenney's failure to sell them. JCPenney factory sets were available in 1982 in a color box and 1983 (SKU 672–1203), 1984 (SKU 672–1641), and 1985 (SKU 672–2029) in brown boxes. From 1986 to 1992, Topps factory sets came in two designs, Retail (or Christmas) and Hobby Dealer. Retail factory sets were in very colorful boxes and were typically released near Christmas time (and for that reason are sometimes called Christmas sets). Hobby Dealer sets were in much plainer boxes until 1993. Topps continues to this day to offer not only retail, hobby, and Christmas sets, but also team-themed factory sets (starting in 2004) with bonus cards exclusive to each one.

=== Tiffany sets ===
From 1984 to 1991, Topps released a limited edition version of both their regular and traded sets called "Tiffany" sets. These sets were released in Hobby Dealer exclusive factory set format only and were identical to the regular cards, but these were printed in Ireland with white cardboard (instead of the then-standard gray cardboard) with a glossy finish on the front. The color of the inner boxes that the Tiffany sets came, in as well as the estimated number of sets produced (according to the annual Beckett price guide), were:

- 1984: Red (10,000)
- 1985: Blue (5,000)
- 1986: Maroon (5,000)
- 1987: Violet (30,000)
- 1988: Green (25,000)
- 1989: Blue (15,000)
- 1990: Red (15,000)
- 1991: Navy (unknown, but believed to be the lowest print run of all, so <5,000)

=== Bowman ===
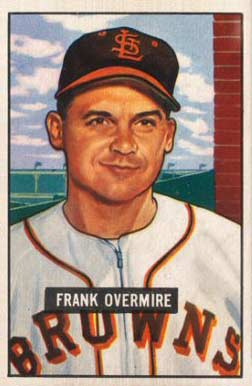
Stubby Overmire displayed on a Bowman card in 1951; five years later, Topps acquired Bowman and added it to its brands portfolio

Bowman was Topps' main competitor from 1951 until Topps bought out Bowman after the 1955 season. Almost 35 years later, in 1989, Topps resurrected the Bowman brand and created a new annual baseball card set, which was unique in two ways. First, the 1989 Bowman cards were 2.5" x 3.75" instead of the standard 2.5" x 3.5" card size (they went back to standard size from 1990 onward, however) and second, its main focus was on upcoming Minor League players who Topps believed had a good chance of making it into the Major Leagues someday, which continues to be the focus of the Bowman sets today. Although the Bowman sets were not very popular in their first three years, that changed in 1992 when Bowman was upgraded to a premium quality set (with ultraviolet coating on both sides and a special subset with bronze foil borders), and very limited production. Since then, Bowman has become more and more oriented towards prospects and rookies. New sets from several sister brands, as well as the core Bowman brand itself, continue to be released each year.

Since the mid-1990s, most of MLB's All-Star / prominent players have been featured on a Bowman card prior to appearing in other mainstream sets. The brand's successful marketing positions led to the introduction of many spin-off products, including Bowman Chrome, Bowman Sterling, Bowman Draft Picks and Prospects, Bowman's Best, Bowman Originals and, most recently, Bowman Platinum.

In the trading card market, particularly within baseball releases, Bowman and Bowman Chrome rookie cards frequently command higher market values and demand among collectors compared to contemporary competitors' brands.

=== Stadium Club ===
Topps released their first "premium" set in 1991 called Stadium Club. This was the very first major baseball card set to feature glossy ultraviolet coating on both sides of the cards as well as gold foil stamping on the front and a borderless (or "full-bleed") Kodak photo on the front. The card backs also featured an image of the player's first Topps card. This set was a major hit at the time, with packs costing $5.00 or more. In 1992, Topps released three different series of Stadium Club cards. There was also a factory set from 1992 in which cards were packed in a reproduction dome stadium, made of plastic, but this was not the same as the regular 1992 Stadium Club set. Inserts have included “1st day issue” and “1st day production” cards.

=== Topps Finest ===
Topps released their first "super premium" set in 1993 called Topps Finest (or just Finest for short). These were issued in six card packs with 18 packs in a box and 12 boxes per case, and only 4,000 cases were produced. This set was also a major hit with packs costing around $25 at the time. Many hobbyists, however, frowned upon such an expensive set, thinking that it was driving the hobby away from younger collectors. Topps also included a Finest All-Star jumbo card (limited to about 1,455 of each) in each box (a 4" x 6" version of the All-Star subset) and randomly inserted (1 in 18 packs) a Refractor insert card which was exactly like the regular card but with a rainbow sheen on the front, with some of them worth over $1,000.00 at that time. Only 241 of each Refractor were produced and continue to this day to be highly sought after.

=== Topps Heritage / Bowman Heritage / Allen & Ginter ===
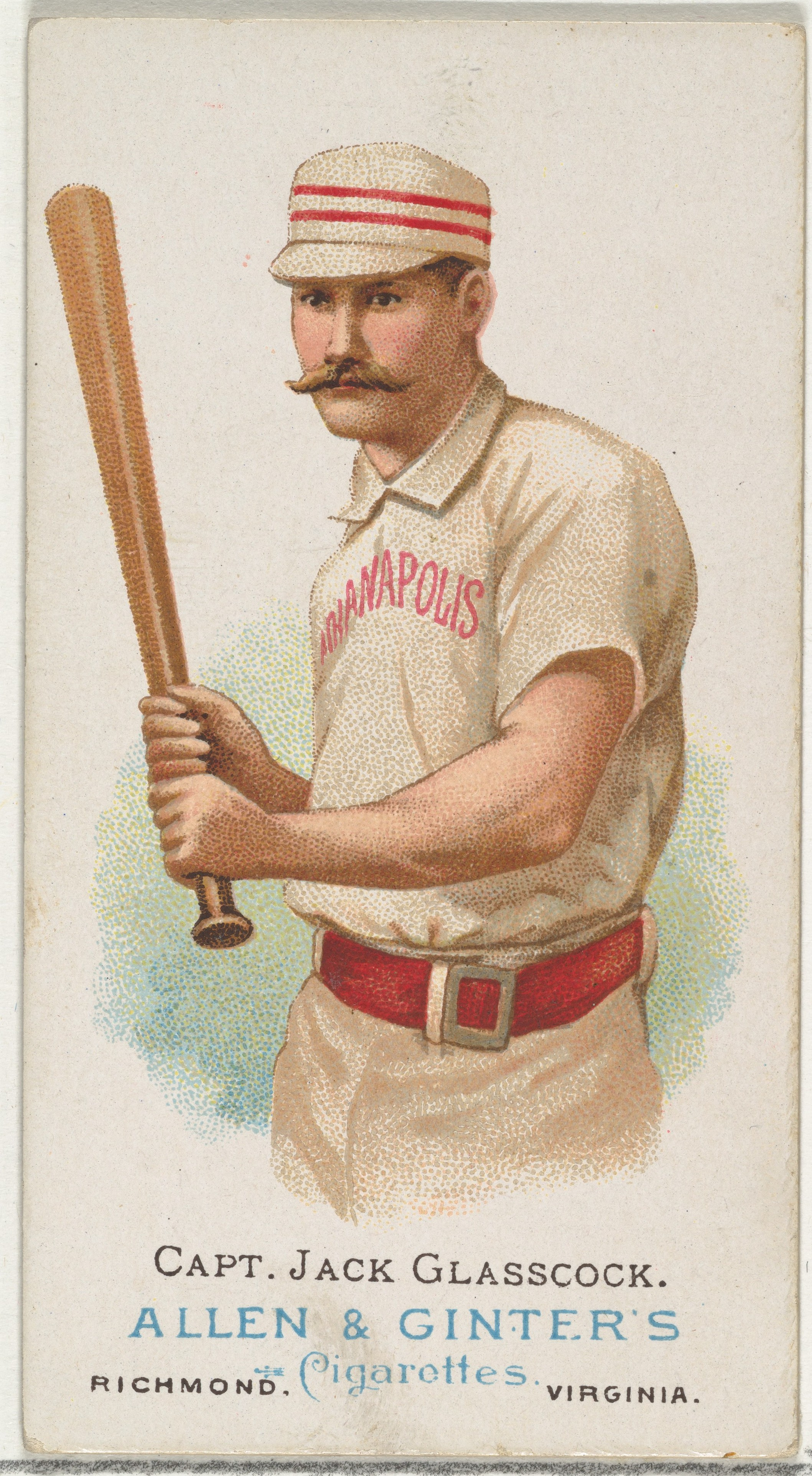
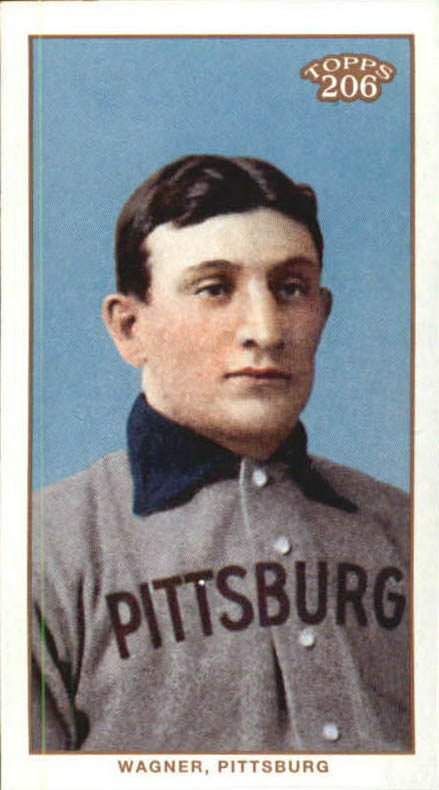
Jack Glasscock on a Allen & Ginter card of 1887. Topps has released heritage baseball cards under the Allen & Ginter brand; (right) a reissue of the T206 Honus Wagner card with a blue background that was released in 2002

In 2001, Topps (for its 50th anniversary) released two new retro-themed brands, Topps Heritage and Bowman Heritage, as part of its baseball, football and hockey card product lines. The novelty was that the brands had modern players with designs from past years. The baseball cards had the design from 1952 for its 2001 selection of Heritage baseball cards, the 1953 design for 2002, the 1954 design for 2003, and so on. Bowman Heritage was also started in 2001 and used the following throwback designs:

- 2001: 1948 Bowman
- 2002: 1954 Bowman
- 2003: proposed 1956 Bowman design (the original 1956 set was not issued due to Topps' buyout of Bowman after 1955)
- 2004: 1955 Bowman
- 2005: 1951 Bowman
- 2006: 1949 Bowman

The Bowman Heritage brand was retired after the 2007 release, replaced by the much more popular Allen & Ginter brand that captivated collectors with its 2006 debut. In 2019, Bowman Heritage returned as an online-only exclusive product using the 1953 Bowman design. Topps Heritage became a baseball exclusive brand in 2007, and it is still an active brand to this day. It is widely considered to be one of the most popular perennial pre-season baseball card releases.

=== Topps T206 ===
The T206 name (originally issued in 1910–1911 by the American Tobacco Company) has been revived by Topps (under the Topps 206 brand) a total of three times, the first in 2002 with a second revival in 2010. Again in 2020, the company released a new collection divided into five different series, with the first (50 cards) being released in May 2020. The collection, named Topps 206, included players from both the Major Leagues and the Minor Leagues. The 5th series was released in September 2020.

The T206 Honus Wagner card was reissued by Topps in 2002, with variations on its background color. The card was printed with the original orange color of 1909 (#179), and also in blue (#307) and red (#456). In 2020, a new Honus Wagner card was issued by the company (#45) as part of the second set (of five) released that year.

=== Topps Project 2020 ===
In 2020 Topps released Topps Project 2020, a 400-card online-only exclusive set which featured 20 artists rendition of 20 iconic Topps Cards.

=== Topps baseball cards outside the United States ===
A Canadian licensed version of the Topps set was produced by the candy company O-Pee-Chee from 1965 until 1992. From 1970 onward, the cards were bilingual in order to comply with Canadian language laws. Checklist guides such as Beckett and the Trading Card Database list Canadian O-Pee-Chee sets separately from U.S. Topps sets, documenting differences in printing and production between the Canadian and the U.S. sets. There were also licensed version Topps sets issued in Venezuela from 1959 to 1977, with some changes and the addition of winter league players. In the late 1980s, Topps issued two sets for the United Kingdom market of American baseball players, complete with explanations of key baseball terms on the cards.

== Products by year ==
A display window at a trading card shop in Hsinchu City, Taiwan

Each year, Topps faced the challenge of designing new cards to distinguish them from the ones that had been released the year before they were. The 1952 to 1956 sets were varied in presentation, but each of them were the same size, 2 5/8" x 3 3/4". The 1952, 1953 and 1954 sets were vertical, the 1955 and 1956 sets horizontal. In 1957, the 2 1/2 x 3 1/2" size card became standard. Also, the design changed dramatically and was now a photograph of the player and not a painting (the latter was done particularly in 1953). The 1957 set is one of the most sought after by hobbyists and collectors due to both its photographic quality and its simple card design. The 1957 set is almost borderless, and the player name, team name, and position are printed in small letters so that the photograph of the player is the dominant feature. More colorful designs and larger borders resumed again until the highly popular 1961 set, which again has smaller borders and less obtrusive team names, player names, and positions.

Until 1964, the colors of the borders, the print, the letters, etc. were random. Starting with the 1964 set, Topps began a trend where each team had their own color scheme. For example, every Dodger card in the 1964 set featured the team name "Dodgers" in red across the top of the card, with the player name and position written in a powder blue field along the bottom of the card. Topps generally had 10 different color scheme designs per year, one for each team in their respective league (National and American); thus, one team in each league shared the same color scheme with one team in the other league.

Starting in 1966, Topps assigned a color scheme to each team that would repeat itself in their 1968 and 1969 sets. The schemes were as follows:

- Yellow printing on a red background: Dodgers and Yankees
- Yellow printing in a green background: Giants and Senators
- White printing on a violet background: Pirates and Red Sox
- White Printing on a blue background: Reds and Twins
- White printing on a lavender background: Braves and Angels
- Red printing on a gray background: Phillies and Indians
- Red printing on a yellow background: Cardinals and Tigers
- White printing on an orange background: Cubs and White Sox
- Black printing on a lime green background: Astros and Orioles
- Yellow printing on a purple background: Mets and Athletics

The 1969 set introduced two new color schemes to accommodate the expansion teams that began play in that year:

- Black printing on a pink background: Expos and Royals
- Yellow printing on a brown background: Padres and Pilots

== Player depictions ==
Players generally gave multiple poses for Topps, and Topps chose which one to put on a card. Among these were head shots of the player with no cap in case he was traded or the team moved. In 1966, the Braves moved from Milwaukee to Atlanta, so every card of a Braves player in the early series of cards is a head shot with no cap, or the cap logo is obstructed or hidden in some way (the profile or the cap is tilted up). Only in the later series are there cards with Braves players wearing the new cap with the letter "A". The same is true for the Angels, whose move from Los Angeles to Anaheim caused a change in their cap logo from and "LA" to a "CA" as they switched from being called the Los Angeles Angels to the California Angels. In later years, Topps developed an airbrush technique where the cap logo would be manually altered or blacked out. For example, the 1968 Athletics, after moving from Kansas City to Oakland, are pictured wearing blacked out caps with green bills.

Topps generally put the biggest stars on card numbers ending in x00 or x50. For example, in the 1966 set, Mickey Mantle is card #50 and Sandy Koufax is card #100. In 1965, Willie Mays is card #250. Other star players were put on card numbers ending in "0" (10, 20, 140, 270, etc.) and minor stars were put on cards ending in "5". Topps continues this numbering system (at least to a certain degree) today.

=== Future Stars ===
Future Stars is a designation used by Topps on certain baseball cards, typically to highlight young players early in their major-league careers. The designation has been used by Topps across multiple decades, with its presentation and role varying by era and product line.

Baseball card writers have noted that Topps has used the Future Stars label across multiple eras and releases, and it has appeared as a named subset in some flagship Topps products. In modern flagship releases, hobby publications have described Future Stars as one of the recurring subsets included in Topps Series 1 and Series 2 checklists.

The Future Stars designation was not used on Topps flagship baseball card checklists during the 1970s, but was introduced as a named subset in the 1980 Topps set. In that release, cards numbered 661–686 were labeled Future Stars and featured team-based cards highlighting multiple young players considered emerging prospects.

Beginning in 1987, Topps applied the Future Stars designation to individual players rather than exclusively to multi-player, team-based cards, representing an early instance in which single-player Future Stars cards appeared in the flagship Topps base set. In that season, the designation was applied to five individual players—B. J. Surhoff, Tim Pyznarski, Pat Dodson, Dave Magadan, and Bo Jackson—whose career stages varied, illustrating that the Future Stars label did not function as a uniform indicator of rookie status.

In the years following 1987, Topps continued to use Future Stars as a named subset within its flagship baseball releases, while rookie cards were separately identified within the same checklists. Hobby publications covering annual Topps products routinely distinguish rookie cards from recurring named subsets such as Future Stars, listing each as distinct checklist categories in Series 1 and Series 2 releases. In these descriptions, Future Stars appears alongside base veterans, rookies, and parallel structures, reflecting its role as a subset designation rather than a formal rookie-card marker.

By the 1990s and 2000s, Topps continued to include Future Stars cards in flagship and related product lines, with the presentation and card design varying by era. In modern releases, checklist guides and manufacturer descriptions continue to identify Future Stars as a recurring subset theme within annual Topps baseball products. As such, the label has persisted across multiple decades of Topps production, functioning as a flexible designation applied to selected emerging players within broader set constructions.

In addition to changes in checklist structure, the visual presentation of Future Stars cards has varied across different eras of Topps production. The 1980 introduction of the designation featured multi-player cards in which the Future Stars title was printed directly on the card front, distinguishing those entries from standard base cards within the same set. The labeling appeared as part of the printed card design rather than as a separate numbering convention or parallel designation.

When Topps began applying the designation to individual players in 1987, the Future Stars marking was incorporated into that year's flagship base-card layout. As with other named subsets, the graphic treatment of the label reflected the broader visual themes of each annual release, including variations in placement, typography, and framing. In subsequent seasons, the appearance of the designation changed in accordance with yearly set designs, while remaining visibly integrated into the card front.

Through the 1990s and 2000s, recurring subset identifiers—including Future Stars—continued to appear within flagship Topps base sets as part of the primary card template rather than as separate product lines. In modern releases, hobby checklist guides and manufacturer descriptions continue to identify Future Stars as a recurring named subset within annual Topps baseball products. Although typography and layout have varied by year, the consistent inclusion of an identifiable Future Stars marker has remained a defining feature when the subset is present in a given release.

== See also ==
- History of Topps baseball cards
