= Francis Lynch =

American politician

Francis J. Lynch

Member of the Pennsylvania Senate from the 2nd district
- In office March 26, 1973 – May 31, 1993
- Preceded by: Benjamin Donolow
- Succeeded by: William Stinson
- Constituency: Part of Philadelphia

Member of the Pennsylvania House of Representatives from the 195th district
- In office January 7, 1969 – March 25, 1973
- Preceded by: District Created
- Succeeded by: Frank Oliver

Member of the Pennsylvania House of Representatives from the Philadelphia County district
- In office January 2, 1967 – November 30, 1968

Personal details
- Born: August 9, 1920 Philadelphia, Pennsylvania, US
- Died: May 31, 1993 (aged 72) Philadelphia, Pennsylvania, US
- Party: Democratic

Francis J. Lynch (August 9, 1920 – May 31, 1993) was an American politician from Pennsylvania who served as a Democratic member of the Pennsylvania State Senate for the 2nd district from 1973 to 1993.

== Early life ==
Lynch was born in Philadelphia, Pennsylvania and attended the Roman Catholic School, Banks Business College and St. John's Night School. He served in the U.S. Army during World War II and was awarded the Purple Heart for wounds received during combat in France.

== Career ==
He was first elected to the Pennsylvania House of Representatives in 1966. He was first elected to represent the 2nd senatorial district in the Pennsylvania Senate in a 1973 special election. Shortly before he died, he left his hospital bed to cast a tie breaking vote on the budget. His death left the Pennsylvania Senate locked in a 24–24 tie.

He died on May 31, 1993, and is interred at Resurrection Cemetery in Bensalem, Pennsylvania.
