= Samuel W. Salus =

American lawyer and politician (1872–1945)

Samuel Weider Salus (August 31, 1872 – December 29, 1945) was an American lawyer and politician.

Born in Philadelphia, Pennsylvania, Salus graduated from Central High School in 1891. In 1895, Salus graduated from University of Pennsylvania Law School. He practiced law in Philadelphia and was involved with the Republican Party. In 1902 and 1903, Salus served on the Philadelphia City Council. He served as an assistant district for Philadelphia County, Pennsylvania from 1904 to 1907. From 1911 to 1938, Salus served in the Pennsylvania State Senate for the 2nd district from 1911 to 1937 and served as president pro tempore of the state senate from 1925 to 1938. Then, from 1903 to 1905, 1909 to 1911, and from 1943 until his death in 1945, Salus served in the Pennsylvania House of Representatives. Salus died in Philadelphia at his home after being ill for three months.

== Personal life ==
Salus was married to Ada Rosenthal. Their son, Samuel W. Salus II (1933–2025), was for 13 years the public defender for Montgomery County, Pennsylvania, and after that a judge of the Court of Common Pleas for 24 years (1980–2004). Salus II presided over the 1981 trial of Molly Rush, Carl Kabat, Anne Montgomery, Philip and Daniel Berrigan and their co-defendants of the Plowshares Eight. Although the convictions were upheld by 4–3 vote of the Pennsylvania Supreme Court, and then a 5–4 vote of the Superior Court, the judge's prejudicial comments led to reversal in 1987 of the defendants' lengthy sentences, leading to the imposition of time-served terms on remand. In the docudrama In the King of Prussia, Salus II is portrayed by Martin Sheen, speaking lines directly from the Plowshares Eight trial transcript.
