= Clarence Charles Newcomer =

American judge (1923–2005)

Senior Judge of the United States District Court for the Eastern District of Pennsylvania
- In office January 19, 1988 – August 22, 2005

Judge of the United States District Court for the Eastern District of Pennsylvania
- In office November 30, 1971 – January 19, 1988
- Appointed by: Richard Nixon
- Preceded by: Charles William Kraft Jr.
- Succeeded by: Herbert J. Hutton

Personal details
- Born: Clarence Charles Newcomer; January 18, 1923 Mount Joy, Pennsylvania
- Died: August 22, 2005 (aged 82) Stone Harbor, New Jersey
- Cause of death: melanoma
- Children: 3 daughters
- Education: Franklin & Marshall College (A.B.); Dickinson School of Law (J.D.)
- Occupation: Judge

Clarence Charles Newcomer (January 18, 1923 – August 22, 2005) was a United States district judge of the United States District Court for the Eastern District of Pennsylvania for more than 33 years.

== Education and career ==
Newcomer was born in Mount Joy, Pennsylvania, to Clarence S. and Clara Charles Newcomer. He graduated from Mount Joy High School in 1941.

Newcomer entered the V-12 Navy College Training Program, and was a United States Naval Reserve Lieutenant of an amphibious landing craft in the Pacific Theater during World War II, from 1943 to 1946. During that time he earned an Artium Baccalaureus degree from Franklin & Marshall College in Lancaster, Pennsylvania, in 1944, where he was a member of Sigma Pi fraternity. He then received a Juris Doctor from Dickinson School of Law (now Pennsylvania State University - Dickinson Law) in Carlisle, Pennsylvania, in 1948. He married Jane Moyer Martin of Lancaster on October 2, 1948, with whom he had three daughters.

Newcomer lived in, and was in private practice in, Lancaster, Pennsylvania, from 1950 to 1971. From 1948 to 1950 he was with the law firm of Arnold, Bricker & Beyer in Lancaster. From 1950-57, he was a solo practitioner, later becoming a partner in the law firm of Rohrer, Honaman, Newcomer & Musser. He was a special deputy commonwealth attorney general of Pennsylvania from 1953 to 1954. He was an assistant district attorney of Lancaster County, Pennsylvania, from 1960 to 1964, and a First Assistant District Attorney from 1964-68. He was District Attorney of Lancaster County from 1968 to 1972, while he was also a partner with the law firm of Newcomer, Roda & Morgan in Lancaster. He lived in Stone Harbor, New Jersey, and Philadelphia, Pennsylvania.

== Federal judicial service ==
Newcomer was nominated by President Richard Nixon on November 17, 1971, to a seat on the United States District Court for the Eastern District of Pennsylvania vacated by Judge Charles William Kraft Jr. He was confirmed by the United States Senate on November 23, 1971, and received his commission on November 30, 1971. He assumed senior status on January 19, 1988, but maintained a full case load. Newcomer served in that capacity until his death on August 22, 2005, from melanoma at his home in Stone Harbor, New Jersey.

During his career as a federal judge, Newcomer presided over a number of mob and public corruption cases. In 1979, he presided over a case in which a Philadelphia businessowner attempted to blow up his own factory to collect money for insurance fraud.

In 1980, he ended Topps Chewing Gum's exclusive right to sell baseball cards, allowing the Fleer Corporation to compete in the market.

In 1985, Newcomer criticized the Philadelphia Police Department for indiscriminately arresting a number of Spanish-speaking people after an officer was killed, calling the arrests "unlawful" and "disgraceful". In 1993 he ruled that a law firm's refusal to promote a female associate to partner violated Title VII of the Civil Rights Act of 1964.

In 1994, Newcomer invalidated a Pennsylvania State Senate election of William G. Stinson he found to be overwhelmingly tainted by election fraud, and declared Bruce Marks the winner, after finding that "substantial evidence was presented establishing massive absentee ballot fraud, deception, intimidation, harassment and forgery." He ruled in 1997 that states cannot discriminate against new residents by paying them lower welfare benefits than they pay longtime residents.

Newcomer presided over a 2005 trial in which a jury awarded residents displaced by the 1972 MOVE bombing by the police a $12.83 million verdict against the City of Philadelphia. Among Newcomer's law clerks was Peter York Solmssen, from 1980 to 1982; Solmssen later became General Counsel of Siemens AG.

== Sources ==
Legal offices
| Preceded by Charles William Kraft Jr. | Judge of the United States District Court for the Eastern District of Pennsylvania; 1971–1988 | Succeeded by Herbert J. Hutton |
