= Donna Bullock (politician) =

American politician

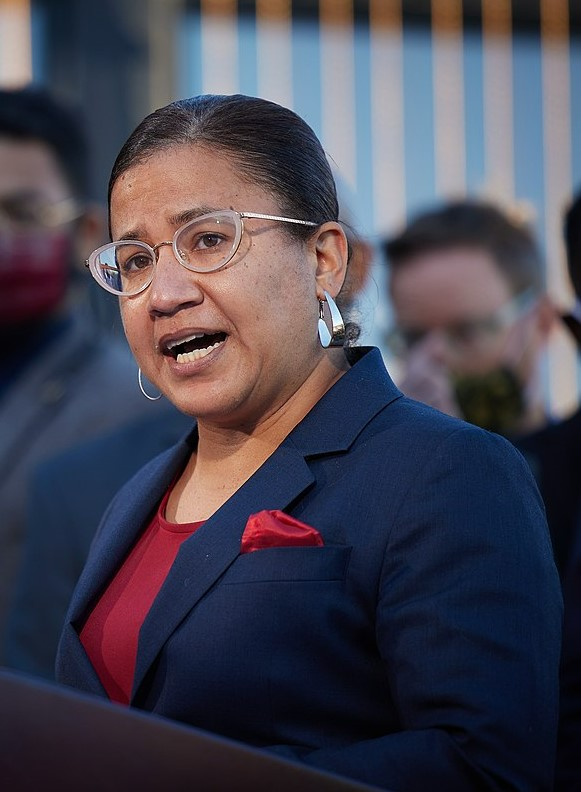

Member of the Pennsylvania House of Representatives from the 195th district
- In office August 25, 2015 – July 15, 2024
- Preceded by: Michelle Brownlee
- Succeeded by: Keith Harris

Personal details
- Born: October 15, 1978 (age 47) New Brunswick, New Jersey, U.S.
- Party: Democratic
- Spouse: Otis L. Bullock Jr.
- Children: 2
- Education: Rutgers University (B.S.); Temple University (J.D.)
- Alma mater: New Brunswick High School
- Website: www.pahouse.com/Bullock

Donna Bullock (born October 15, 1978) is an American politician. She is a former Democratic member of the Pennsylvania House of Representatives, representing the 195th district in Philadelphia from 2015 to 2024.

== Early life and education ==
Bullock was born on October 15, 1978, in New Brunswick, New Jersey. Growing up, Bullock faced housing instability, moving from house to house before her mother secured a housing voucher. She graduated from New Brunswick High School in 1996. Bullock earned a bachelor of science degree in administration of justice from Rutgers University in 2000 and a juris doctor degree from Temple University's Beasley School of Law in 2003.

== Career ==
Bullock was first elected to represent the 195th district in the Pennsylvania House of Representatives in an August 2015 special election, defeating Republican candidate Adam Lang. She previously served as a senior staffer to the Philadelphia City Council.

From 2021 to 2023, Bullock chaired the Pennsylvania Legislative Black Caucus. She also chaired the House Committee on Children and Youth and the House Ethics Committee during the 2023-2024 legislative session.

In 2024, Bullock became the CEO for Project Home, a Philadelphia-based non-profit that focuses on providing housing for unhomed populations, replacing former Executive Director Mary Scullion and Associate Executive Director Joan Dawson McConnon. She resigned from the Pennsylvania House in July 2024.

== Electoral history ==
2015 Pennsylvania House of Representatives special election, District 195
Party	Candidate	Votes	%
Democratic	Donna Bullock	2,587	86.12
Republican	Adam A. Lang	417	13.88
Total votes		3,004	100.00

2016 Pennsylvania House of Representatives Democratic primary election, District 195
Party	Candidate	Votes	%
Democratic	Donna Bullock (incumbent)	12,393	78.58
Democratic	Jimmie Moore	1,779	11.28
Democratic	Jamar T. Izzard	1,599	10.14
Total votes		15,771	100.00

2016 Pennsylvania House of Representatives election, District 195
Party	Candidate	Votes	%
Democratic	Donna Bullock (incumbent)	Unopposed	
Total votes		30,269	100.00

2018 Pennsylvania House of Representatives election, District 195
Party	Candidate	Votes	%
Democratic	Donna Bullock (incumbent)	Unopposed	
Total votes		25,525	100.00

2020 Pennsylvania House of Representatives election, District 195
Party	Candidate	Votes	%
Democratic	Donna Bullock (incumbent)	30,022	99.43
Write-in		173	0.57
Total votes		30,195	100.00

2022 Pennsylvania House of Representatives election, District 195
Party	Candidate	Votes	%
Democratic	Donna Bullock (incumbent)	19,697	99.44
Write-in		110	0.56
Total votes		19,807	100.00
