= 1971 Topps Card Set =

Set of football cards

The 1971 Topps Card set was a set of football cards released in 1971 by Topps. The set contains 263 cards and was the first set of football cards to acknowledge the AFL-NFL merger with the new AFC and NFC conferences. The set is most known for the rookie card of Terry Bradshaw, however there are many other valuable cards such as Joe Greene and Marty Schottenheimer's rookie card.

== Appearance ==
Each card measured the standard 2-1/2 by 3-1/2 inches. The front of the card contained the player's name, picture, team & logo, position, & their conference. The background would be blue if they were in the NFC, & red if they were in the AFC. All-Star players had both colors for the background. The back contains the card number & personal information such as their height, birthdate, weight, residence, & rookie year. It also contained a short biography about the player, with the player's career statistics being on the bottom with the copyright.

== Value ==
Because the card set has only a few notable cards, a complete set goes for around $1000-$13,000 depending on condition.
