= Portland Flats =

First luxury apartment building in Washington, D.C.

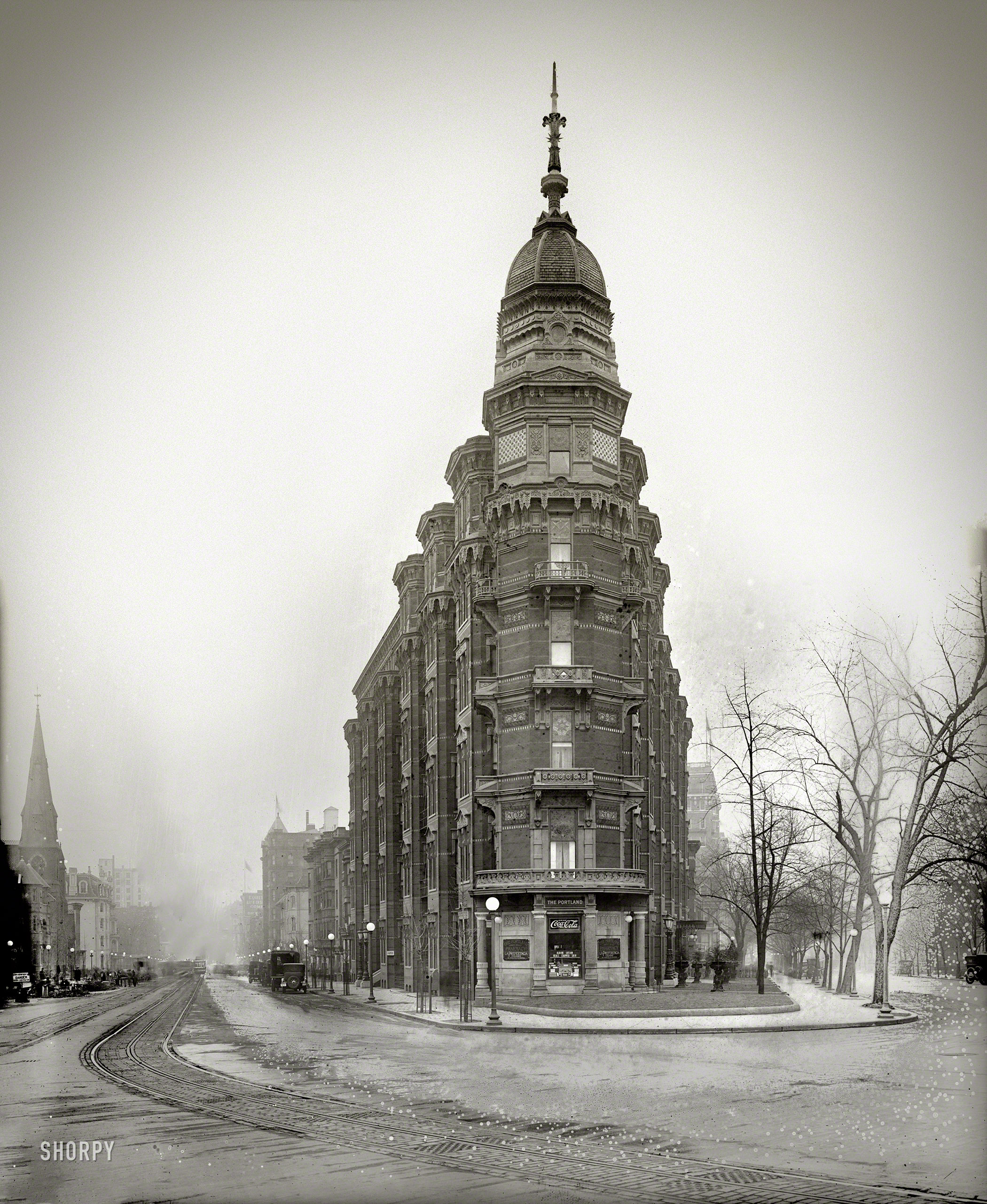
- Portland Flats in 1917

- Location within Washington, D.C.

General information
- Architectural style: Renaissance Revival
- Location: Washington, D.C., United-States
- Coordinates: 38°54′17″N 77°01′56″W
- Completed: 1881
- Demolished: 1962
- Owner: Edward Weston

Design and construction
- Architects: Adolf Cluss & Paul Schulze

The Portland Flats (later known as the Portland Hotel) was the first luxury apartment building constructed in Washington, D.C. Construction of the elaborate building, designed by architect Adolf Cluss, was completed in 1881. It was built on the south side of Thomas Circle, a traffic circle and park where 14th Street NW, M Street NW, Massachusetts Avenue NW, and Vermont Avenue NW intersect. The triangular-shaped building's main architectural feature was the corner tower and dome, which resulted in the Portland Flats resembling an ocean liner sailing into Thomas Circle.

Portland Flats was built as a business venture for Edward L. Weston. Apartment buildings had become a popular residential option in his native New York, and the trend continued in Washington, D.C., after completion of the Portland Flats. Its design and prestige influenced dozens of apartment buildings being constructed in the city within a decade of its completion. There would eventually be hundreds of apartment buildings constructed in Washington, D.C., during the next several decades. Many of these were later demolished, including the Portland Flats in 1962. It was replaced with an office building that was later converted into a hotel. The design of the Portland Flats later inspired an identically-named residential building constructed in Brookland.

== History ==
=== Development and construction ===
The area around present-day Thomas Circle in Washington, D.C., was mostly undeveloped until after the Civil War. Before then there were only two prominent residential buildings: a house built for Treasury Secretary William H. Crawford in 1820 on the northwest edge of the circle and a mansion on the northeast edge of the circle built for Thomas Coltman in 1843, which was later known as the Wylie Mansion, named after Judge Andrew Wylie. A streetcar line was built along 14th Street NW in the 1860s, making the area more accessible to residents and leading to development. The circle itself, called Memorial Circle at the time, was made into a park in the early 1870s, and Luther Place Memorial Church was built on the north side of the circle in 1873. The circle was renamed Thomas Circle in 1879 when the equestrian statue of George Henry Thomas was installed.

The city's population grew rapidly during and after the Civil War, leading to a housing shortage. Members of Congress often lamented the fact there were no acceptable places to rent with the $5,000 salary they received, and they often stayed in boardinghouses or hotels. There arose a need for apartment buildings to address the problem. In April 1880 an article in The Washington Post noted "Among the thousand and one boardinghouses in Washington, from the semi-hotel to the two-story brick home with its stuffy parlor, there is a not a French flat. Mr. Edward Weston, a retired capitalist of Yonkers, N.Y., proposes to erect here the first house of this style ever built at the Capitol."

Edward L. Weston, a retired New York businessman who had moved to Washington, D.C., in 1878, chose architect and engineer Adolf Cluss (1825-1905) and his business partner Paul Schulze to design an apartment building facing Thomas Circle, the city's first luxury apartment house. Cluss was a German immigrant who moved to Washington, D.C., in the 1850s. He quickly gained a reputation as a talented architect, designing prominent buildings including the Franklin School and Charles Sumner School, Calvary Baptist Church, and the Smithsonian's Arts and Industries Building. Cluss also designed Weston's five-story home at 1426 K Street NW, built in 1878 and demolished in 1950.

A few months before Weston's building was completed, former US representative and New York City mayor Fernando Wood built the first apartment building in Washington, D.C., the Fernando Wood Flats, at 1418 I Street NW. Building permit #1596 was issued for the first phase of Weston's building, the Portland Flats, on June 16, 1880. Weston was reluctant to invest a large amount of money in what was then a new trend in local housing, although he had witnessed the success and popularity of such apartment buildings in New York City and Chicago in the 1870s. Weston told a Post reporter that for the Portland Flats he would "spare no pains in its construction and will pay particular attention to interior decorations". There were doubts amongst some about how successful the business venture would be. One real estate developer said "When the Portland was projected by Mr. Edward Weston he was laughed at, and it was said the people of Washington would never come to living in 'tenement' houses."

The six-story Renaissance Revival-style Portland Flats was built to accommodate the lot's triangular shape where 14th Street and Vermont Avenue intersect with Thomas Circle. In April 1881 an article in the Post stated: "The Portland French flat, at the corner of Fourteenth street and Vermont avenue, will be a finished work some time next week, and a work of beauty it will be." The design was reminiscent of an "ocean liner sailing into Thomas Circle." The cost to rent these apartments was very expensive at the time: $150 a month, which was much higher than the Fernando Wood Flats at $55 a month.

The price and reputation of the Portland Flats led to its popularity with prominent citizens, and construction of the second phase of the building began after permit #0812 was issued on February 2, 1883. After the second phase was completed, the building included 39 apartments at a total cost of $350,000. Notable residents of the Portland Flats included Supreme Court Justice Lucius Quintus Cincinnatus Lamar, Agriculture Secretary Julius Sterling Morton, Navy Secretary John Davis Long, Rear Admiral Samuel Rhoads Franklin, Louisiana Representative E. John Ellis, New York Representatives Sereno E. Payne and Edward Wemple, Postmasters General John Creswell and Frank Hatton, US Attorney George B. Corkhill, Indiana Senators Daniel W. Voorhees and Albert J. Beveridge, Vermont Senator William P. Dillingham, Iowa Senator Albert B. Cummins, Michigan Senator Charles E. Townsend, Tennessee Senator Kenneth McKellar, and the widow of Kentucky Governor Luke P. Blackburn.

=== Later history ===
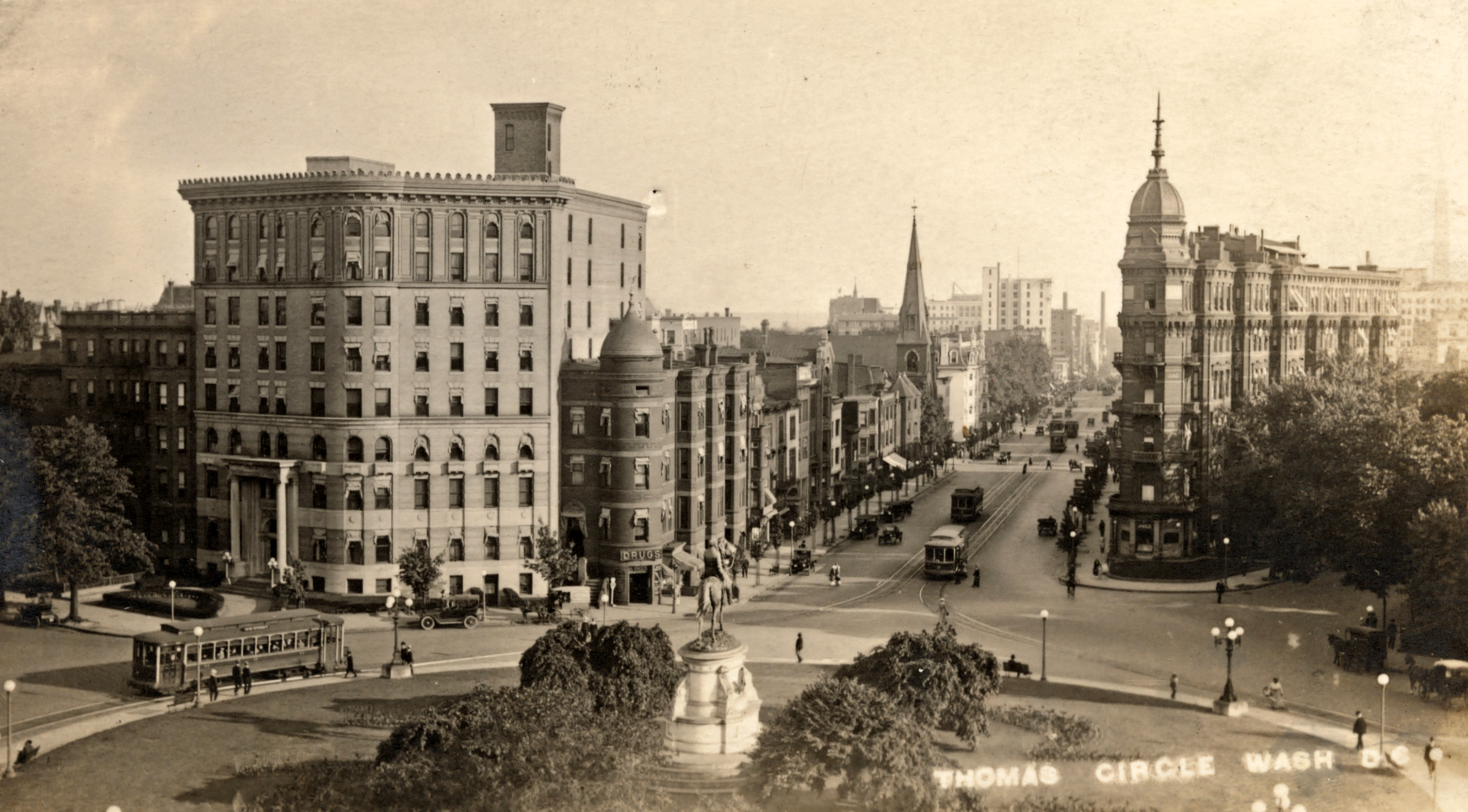
Thomas Circle in 1916 with the Portland Flats on the right

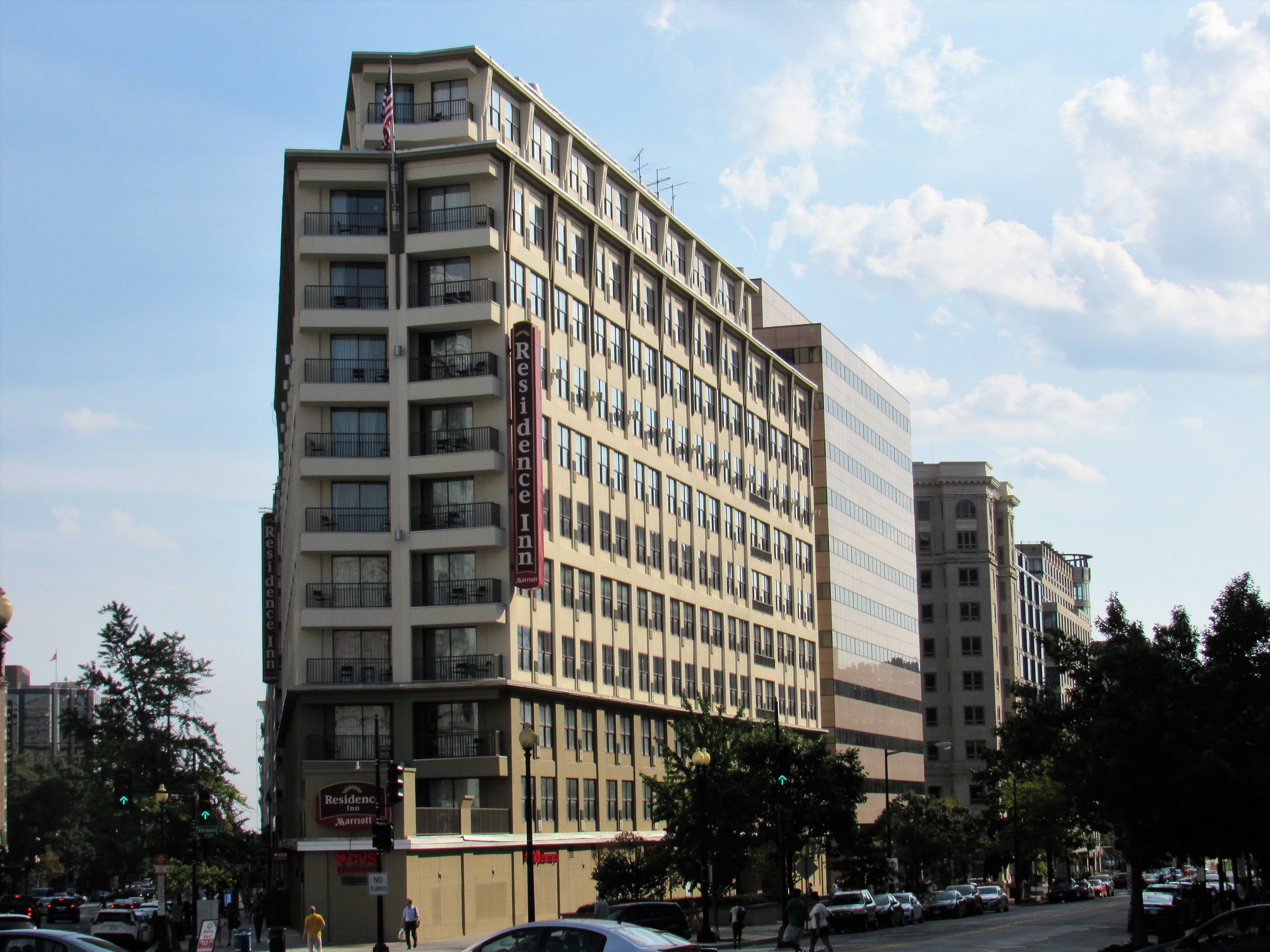
The Portland Flats was demolished in 1962. A Residence Inn by Marriott hotel now stands on the location.

In 1888 the Post called the Portland Flats a "regular gold mine to its owner". The success of the project influenced the development of around 50 apartment buildings throughout the city in the 1880s. Around 15 apartment buildings would eventually be constructed on four adjacent blocks. The construction of these buildings near the Portland Flats along with ornate houses being constructed along Massachusetts Avenue, which intersects with Thomas Circle, enhanced the prestige of the area. Apartments grew increasingly popular amongst Washingtonians, and by 1904 over 300 apartment buildings had been constructed, increasing to almost 600 by 1910.

In 1905 an iron and glass marquee by Frederick Gichner of Gichner Iron Works was installed above the Vermont Avenue entrance. The Portland Flats continued to be a popular choice for luxury apartment living until the 1920s, when the ornate style of the building began to fall out of favor, in addition to many other apartment options being available throughout the city. In 1922 a fire broke out in Senator McKellar's fifth-floor apartment, quickly spreading to the sixth floor and roof. Firefighters arrived quickly on the scene and thousands of spectators watched as they battled the blaze. The fifth-floor was heavily damaged by fire, the sixth floor by smoke, and the lower floors by water that was used to extinguish the flames.

The following year the owners, who were relatives of Weston, sold the Portland Flats to local real estate developer Harry Wardman for $450,000. The first floor was remodeled with five storefronts being built. It was sold shortly thereafter and converted from an apartment building into the Portland Hotel in 1926. The property was sold again in 1928 for $600,000, and an extensive interior remodeling took place. By this time much of the building's prestige had vanished.

The elaborate Victorian details seemed out of place to most people by the 1930s. The building was converted to office space around 1940, and there was more extensive interior remodeling but few changes to the exterior. The property and another former apartment building on the same block, the Hermitage, were sold in 1953 for $600,000. In 1962 property owners Parkwood, Inc., demolished the Portland and replaced it with a surface parking lot. All of the other pre-World War I apartment buildings constructed in the adjacent blocks were also demolished during this time period and replaced with office buildings.

In the 1960s historic preservation was still in its infancy. Post architecture critic Wolf Von Eckardt commented on the demise of the Portland, which he called a "charming period piece" but also stated: "Inside, let's face it, it's a slum as well as a labyrinth and totally unsuitable as an office building." He also criticized the building's corner dome "which somehow can't decide how to stop. It goes on to pierce the sky with a silly pinnacle reminiscent of Kaiser Wilhelm's helmet." Myra MacPherson, at the time a reporter for the Evening Star, watched the slow demolition of the building.

The site was used as a parking lot for a few years, including for people attending National City Christian Church across Thomas Circle, until an 11-story office building was constructed in 1968. The building was later converted into a Residence Inn by Marriott hotel. Monroe Street Market, a mixed-use project across the street from the Catholic University of America in Brookland, was built in 2014 and includes the Portland Flats, a 100-unit residential building inspired by the original Portland Flats design.

== Location and design ==
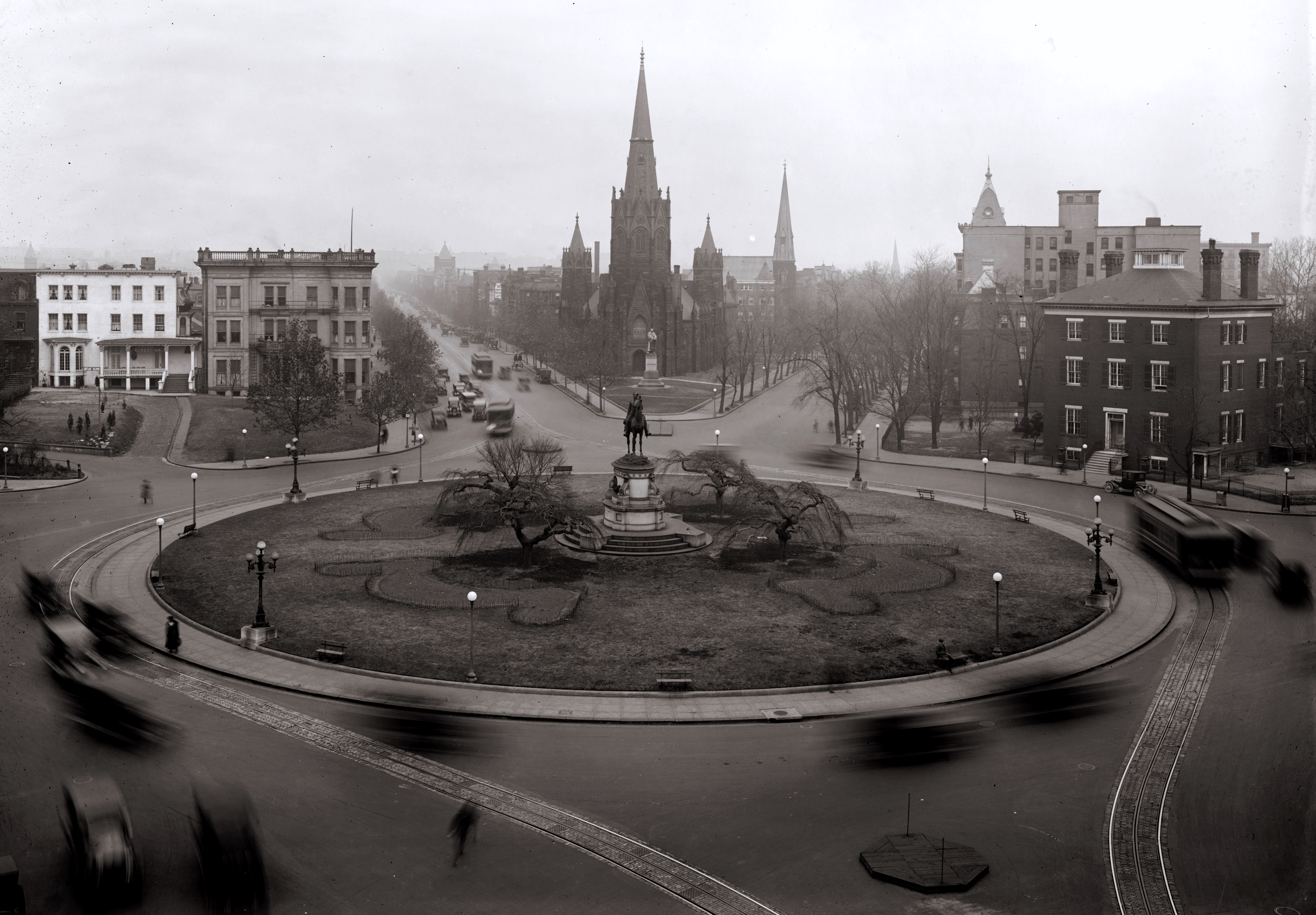
Thomas Circle in 1922, as viewed from the Portland Flats. Luther Place Memorial Church and the equestrian statue of George Henry Thomas are visible.

The Portland Flats was located on Square 215, Lot 12, a triangular lot bordered by 14th Street NW on the east and Vermont Avenue NW on the west. The northern corner of the lot is on the south side of Thomas Circle, a traffic circle and park in Washington, D.C., at the intersection of 14th Street, M Street NW, Massachusetts Avenue NW, and Vermont Avenue NW.

Author and historian John DeFerrari said the shape of the Portland Flats was the "closest Washington has come to having its own Flatiron Building." The red-brick, triangular-shaped building had six floors, not including the basement, and was designed in the Renaissance Revival style with intricate Victorian details including "decorative carvings, glazed brick accents, elaborate belt courses and balconies, and an unusually gaudy fifth floor cornice that appeared almost to drip with ornamentation". The main entrance of the building was on Vermont Avenue. There were three secondary entrances, one on 14th Street, and two leading into the first floor drugstore that faced Thomas Circle. The defining feature of the Portland Flats was a circular tower on the north side facing Thomas Circle. The octagonal tower featured balconies and was topped with a turret and dome.

There were 39 apartments in the Portland Flats each with 10-foot (3.0 m) ceilings and projecting bay windows, providing an abundance of natural light. The largest apartments were on the first through fourth floors. The largest apartments had seven rooms, including a parlor, servants' room, dining room, bathroom, and three bedrooms. Most apartments did not have a kitchen since residents preferred to eat in one of the public dining rooms. Each apartment included a coal-burning fireplace in the parlor and dining room, mostly for aesthetic purposes, but steam heating was used throughout the building. The parlor fireplaces featured "rich ebony mantles, ornamental tile borders and hearths and are surmounted by beveled mirrors". Also included in each apartment was a telephone that connected to the public dining room, janitor's office, and elevator.

There were two hydraulic elevators in the building, a modern feature that enhanced the prestige of the Portland Flats. Some of the larger apartments included a dumbwaiter to the basement level. There were two main staircases in addition to a staircase for servants, each lit by skylights. In addition to the lobby and parlor on the first floor, there were three public dining rooms, one of which was for women, a standard practice at the time of its construction. A corner drugstore and two apartments facing a small courtyard were also on the first floor. The public hallways were marble-tiled and featured arches.
