= Adolf Cluss =

German-American architect (1825–1905)

Adolf Ludwig Cluss
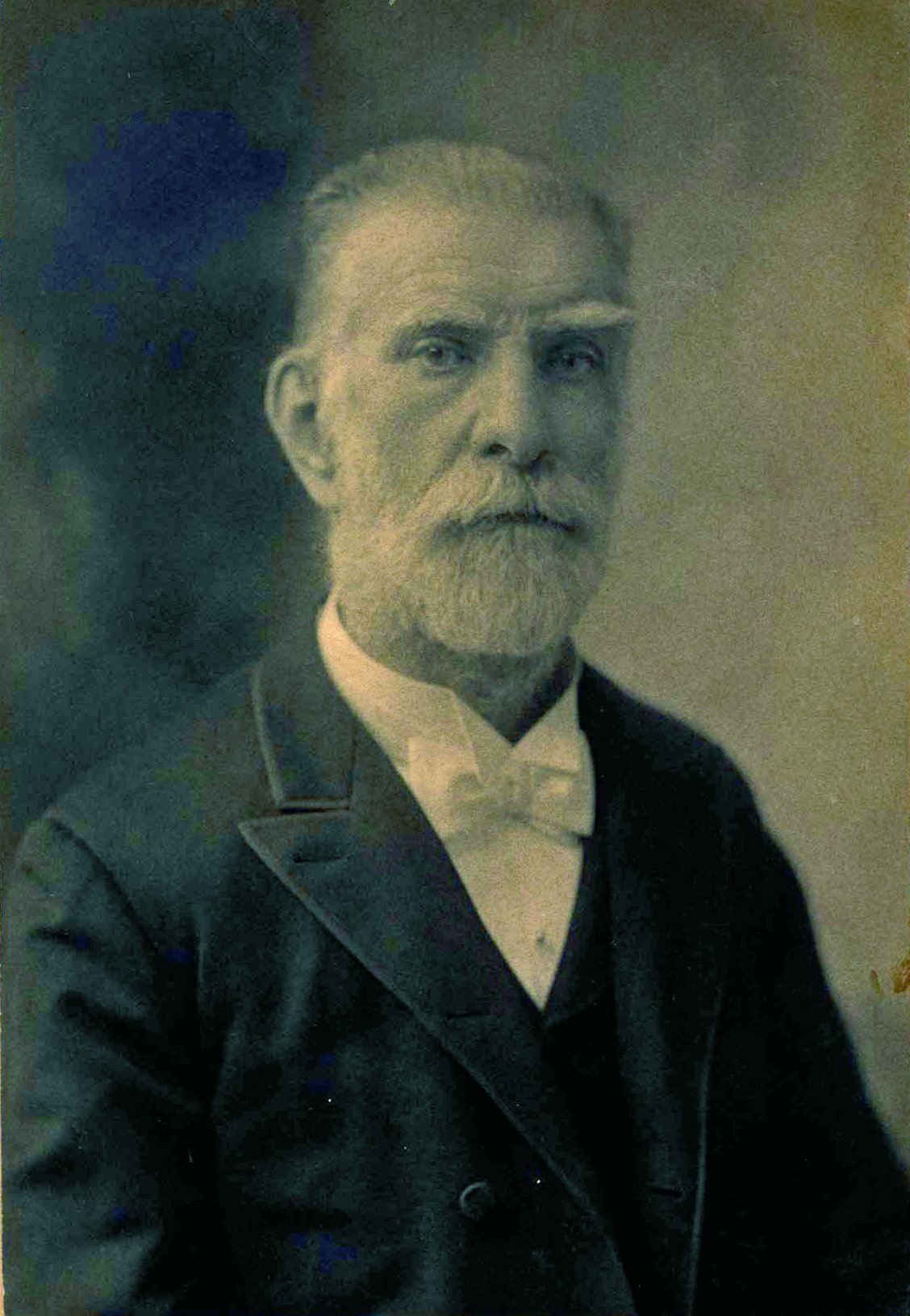
- Cluss in 1900
- Born: July 14, 1825; Heilbronn, Kingdom of Württemberg, German Confederation
- Died: July 24, 1905 (aged 80); Washington D.C., U.S.
- Resting place: Oak Hill Cemetery; Washington, D.C., U.S.
- Occupation: Architect
- Spouse: Rosa Schmidt
- Children: Lillian Cluss; Anita T. Cluss; Adolph S. Cluss; Carl Louis Cluss; Flora Maude Cluss; Robert Cluss; Richard Basil Cluss
- Awards: Fellow of the American Institute of Architects (1867); Member of the Board of Public Works (1872)
- Buildings: Arts and Industries Building Calvary Baptist Church; Charles Sumner School; Eastern Market; Center Market; Franklin School Army Medical Museum and Library

Adolf Ludwig Cluss (July 14, 1825 – July 24, 1905) also known as Adolph Cluss was a German-born American immigrant who became one of the most important, influential and prolific architects in Washington, D.C., in the late 19th century, responsible for the design of numerous schools and other notable public buildings in the capital. Today, several of his buildings are still standing. He was also a City Engineer and a Building Inspector for the Board of Public Works.

Red brick was Cluss' favorite building material; that, and his early communist sympathies, led some to dub him the "Red Architect", though he was a man who in later life became a confirmed Republican.

== Life ==
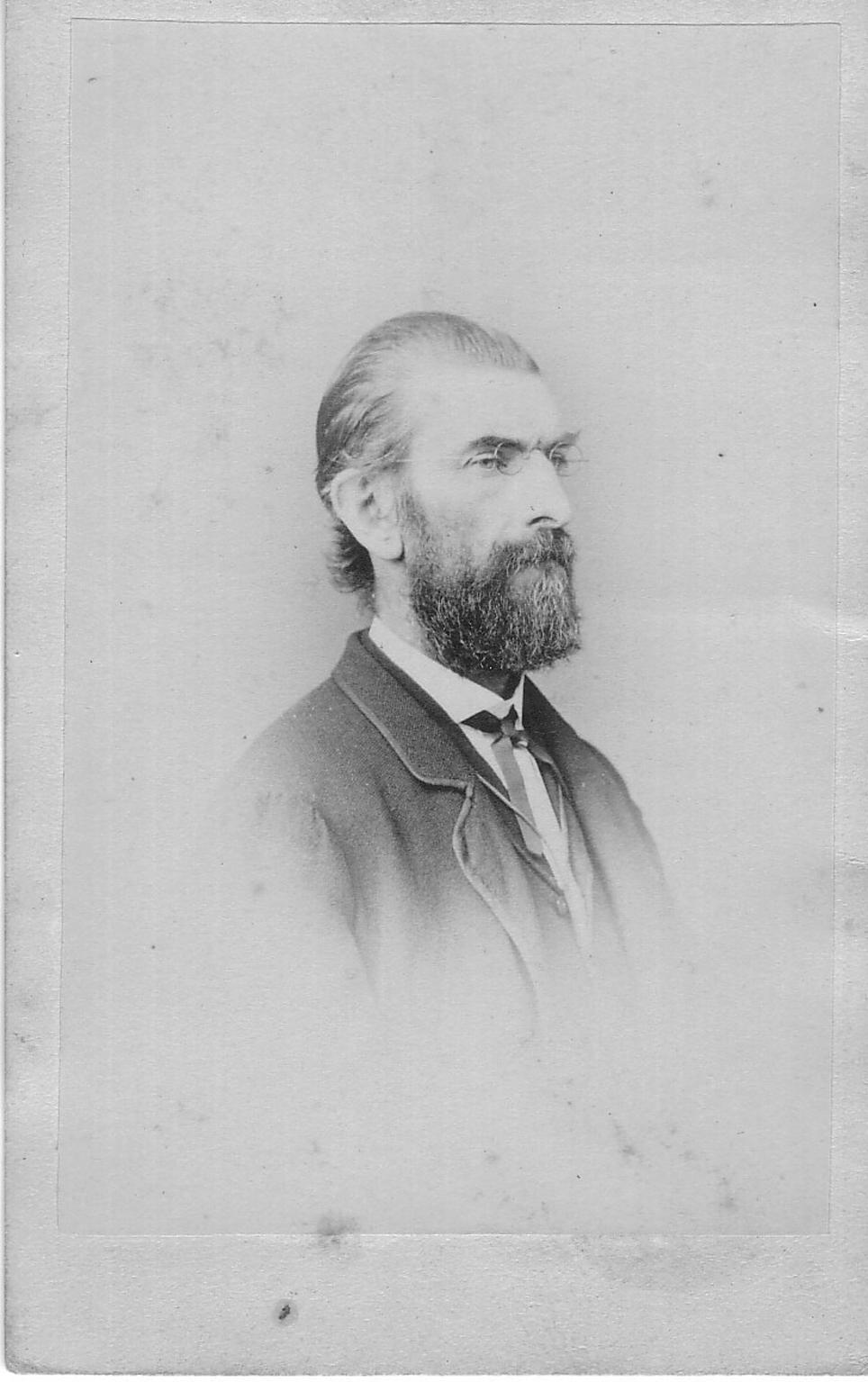
Adolf Cluss (ca. 1860)

He was born on July 24, 1825, in Heilbronn in the Kingdom of Württemberg in Southwest Germany. He was the fifth child of Johann Heinrich Abraham Cluss (1792–1857) and Anna Christine Neuz (1796–1827). His father was a master builder, and young Cluss set out as an itinerant carpenter when he left Heilbronn at age nineteen. In his travels, he met and became a friend of Karl Marx and a supporter of communist principles at a time of political and revolutionary ferment in Germany. He joined the Communist League and became a member of the Mainz Worker Council. The failure of the German revolutionary movement in 1848 led him to leave Germany when he was twenty-three, along with other Forty-Eighters who emigrated to the United States at that time. In the United States, he continued his political activity into the 1850s, maintaining an extensive correspondence with Marx and Engels and writing and publishing political articles for the German-American community.

=== Early life in America ===
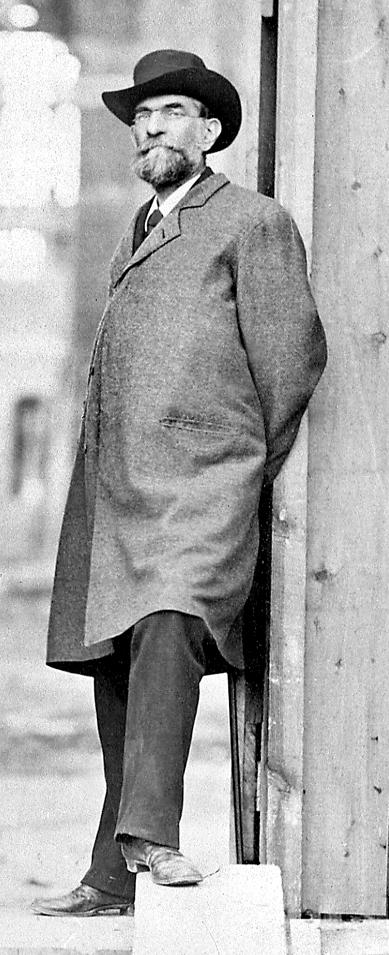
Adolf Cluss in front of the National Museum (1880)

Adolf Cluss immigrated to the United-States in 1848 at the age of 23. He crossed the Atlantic on board the Zürich, a small sailing ship from Le Havre, France to New York City. He spent the first six months in New York City where he perfected his English. He looked for work in Philadelphia, Baltimore and finally settled in Washington, D.C., in the 1849. In the summer of 1849, he started working for the United States Coast Survey as a technical draftsman surveying the Maryland and Virginia coastlines. The following year, he worked at the Washington Navy Yard designing various project for the Ordnance Department. He did not like this position or his life in the city and considered going back to Europe. He considered becoming a bookseller in 1852, requesting funds from his father who did not provide the funds. In 1855, he became a US citizen and transferred to the US Treasury Department as a technical draftsman. He became an abolitionist sometime after that time.

He briefly returned to Europe in 1859 to receive his share of the inheritance this father had left him when he died in 1857 and returned to Philadelphia. He attempted to become a brewer with a friend but the business soon failed and he was back to his old position in the Ordnance Department at the Washington Navy Yard working closely with Admiral John A. Dahlgren.

=== Private Practice ===
Adolf Cluss started his private practice in 1862. While America was torn apart in the Civil War and while still working at the Navy Yard, Cluss started an architectural office with another German immigrant Josef Wildrich von Kammerhueber. He continued to work full-time at the Navy Yard until the following year and part-time as an architect. His partner was working full-time from Cluss' house on 2nd Street, NW. In 1864, their breakthrough was the Wallach School. Adolf Cluss was 39 years old.

Cluss and Kammerhueber were also civil engineers as many architects at the time. In 1864, the City of Washington requested Cluss and Kammerhueber to write a report on the Washington City Canal and the sewer system. This report led to the Canal being finally covered over in 1871 which had become an open sewer on the National Mall. The partnership ended in 1868. He became an active member of the American Institute of Architects in 1867.

=== Board of Public Works ===
Cluss maintained his solo private practice but became a Building Inspector for the Board of Public Works in Washington, DC. The Board was the most powerful entity in the city. Cluss wrote building regulations and was a major proponent of the use of building permits and inspections. On October 18, 1872, he was appointed by President Ulysses S. Grant as a member of the Board of Public Works and City Engineer. This came at the recommendation of Governor Cooke, Alexander "Boss" Shepherd and his predecessor Alfred B. Mullett.

I most earnestly recommend the appointment of Adolph Cluss Esq. to fill the vacancy on the Board of Public Works, caused by my resignation. He is a competent architect and engineer and an earnest and sincere republican, and in my opinion a gentleman of the very highest integrity. I know of no person in the District of Columbia whose appointment would in my opinion give more general satisfaction or who is more competent. Mr. Cluss' appointment would, I think, be highly appreciated by the german republicans of this city.

— Alfred B. Mullett

Cluss had become a member of the local Republican party by then and had led a volunteer committee of local Republicans coordinating parts of the President's inauguration after having been re-elected that same year. He also volunteered in President James A. Garfield's inauguration committee in 1880.

The Board had been working to improve the city by paving and grading roads, adding sewers and planting trees but there was a cost associated with this. The expenditures by the Board of Public Works led the city to be on the brink of bankruptcy. Adolf Cluss testified before a Joint Committee in May 1874. His appointment was revoked by the President on May 25, 1874. Congress to pass legislation on June 30, 1874, abolishing the territorial government and replacing it with the three-member Board of Commissioners.

=== Return to private practice ===
In 1877, he partnered with architect Frederick Daniel with an office at 701 15th Street, NW but the partnership came to an end in 1878. The following year, he started working with architect Paul Schulze. The partnership came to an end in 1889 when Cluss retired from his private practice having built almost 90 buildings including at least eleven schools, as well as markets, government buildings, museums, residences and churches. Cluss' schoolhouse designs were particularly innovative and influential, though only two of his red-brick school masterpieces remain, Franklin School and Sumner School in downtown Washington. The Franklin School was completed in 1869 earning the Washington public school system a Medal for Progress. He designed four major buildings on the National Mall, including the still-standing Smithsonian Arts and Industries Building. He built six houses of worship including Calvary Baptist Church which still stands.

Two of the city's largest food markets, Center Market (1872) and Eastern Market (1873), were built to his design. The first was torn down in 1931 to be replaced by the National Archives Building. The second is still standing having survived a fire in 2007. His flagship store for Lansburgh's opened in 1882.

Cluss was also active as a builder of mansions for the Washington elite, such as Stewart's Castle on Dupont Circle. In 1880, he was hired to create what became Washington's first luxury apartment building, Portland Flats, an ornate, six-floor, 39-unit creation on the south side of Thomas Circle. Almost all of Cluss' residential creations have been demolished—Portland Flats, for instance, was torn down in 1962 to make way for an office building.

In 1877, he was commissioned to oversee the reconstruction of the Old Patent Office Building (today the National Portrait Gallery) in Washington, D.C.

=== American Institute of Architects involvement ===
Adolf Cluss was an active member of the American Institute of Architects. He became a fellow of the Institute in 1876.

He also attended several conventions over the years:

- 21st Annual Convention of the American Institute of Architects – October 19 to October 21, 1887, in Chicago, IL.
- 22nd Annual Convention of the American Institute of Architects – October 17 to October 19, 1888, in Buffalo, New York, during which he presented a paper: Mortars and Concretes of Antiquity and Modern Times. He attended the conversation with some of his daughters as reported by the transcript of the convention.
- 24th Annual Convention of the American Institute of Architects – October 22, 1890, in Washington, DC.
- 25th Annual Convention of the American Institute of Architects – October 28, 1891, in Boston, MA
- 32nd Annual Convention of the American Institute of Architects – November 1, 1898, in Washington, D.C. Presented a communication on Acoustics.

He was one of the founding members of the Washington, D.C., chapter in 1887. He attended Annual Meetings of the Washington Chapter including the January 7, 1898, meeting.

In 1889, he was elected for one year as a member of the Board of Directors of the American Institute of Architects.

=== Inspector of Federal Buildings ===
He became an Inspector of Federal Buildings in the Office of the Supervising Architect under the United States Department of the Treasury in 1889 after closing his private office in June of that year. He inspected the Ellis Island buildings in February 1892 and wrote a report on July 15, 1892, a few months after the first Immigration Station opened. He testified in front of the House Committee on Immigration and Naturalization on how the humidity was a concern in the building only a few months after it was built. He also inspected many other buildings around the country including the Post Office designed by Alfred B. Mullet in Chicago.

On September 1, 1894, a few months after the death of his wife and after the victory by the Democrats, he was asked for his resignation by Secretary of the Treasury John G. Carlisle. He had solicited letters of support from several prominent people but was replaced by a Democrat.

=== Personal life ===
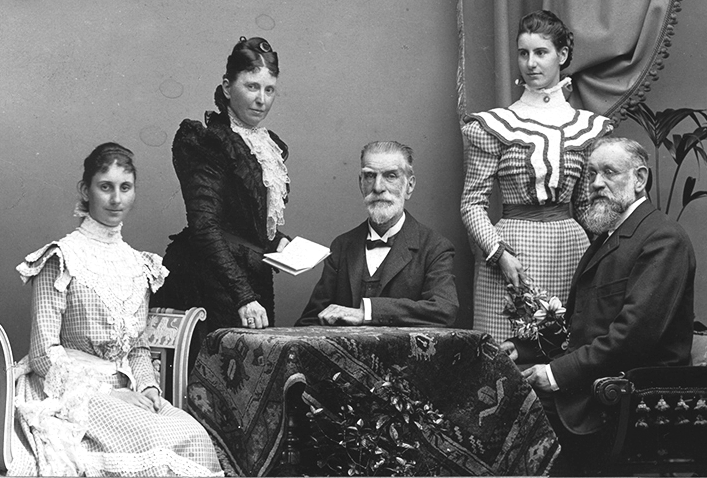
Adolf Cluss (center) with his sister's family, the de Millas in Heidelberg, Germany (1898)

On February 8, 1859, he married Rosa Schmidt (1835–1894) at Zion Lutheran Church in Baltimore, Maryland. They lived in a row house at 413 2nd Street, NW between D Street, NW and E Street, NW for thirty-five years. They raised seven children in that house.

- Lillian Cluss: She was born on January 2, 1860. She had married William Daw and lived above the Daw's pharmacy at 23rd and H Street NW. She died on February 16, 1935.
- Anita T. Cluss: She was born on September 6, 1861. She was a harpist at St. John's Church and in the Georgetown Orchestra. She died on November 25, 1917.
- Adolph S. Cluss: He was born on January 29, 1863. He worked as a clerk for his father. He died in 1886 at the age of 23 of typhoid fever.
- Carl Louis Cluss: He was born on August 14, 1865. He worked as pharmacist. He died 1894 (6 months after his mother) of typhoid fever at the age of 29.
- Flora Maude Cluss: she was born in December 1870. She married Henry S. Lathrop (of New York) on January 21, 1901, and then moved to New York. She died around 1953.
- Robert Cluss: He was born on November 4, 1873. He died in April 1893 at the age of 19 of tuberculosis.
- Richard Basil Cluss: He was born on September 30, 1875.

His wife died on April 10, 1894 a year after her son Robert of a lengthy respiratory illness. Following the death of Robert, Carl and Rosa Schmidt, Flora and Anita moved to their sister Lillian's house.

As published in the Evening Star on March 18, 1897, Cluss was on the Delinquent District of Columbia Real Estate Tax List owing $8.41 as of July 1, 1896.

In the spring and summer of 1898, Cluss traveled to Germany, Italy and Central Europe and visited his older sister's (Caroline De Millas née Cluss) family in Heidelberg, Germany.

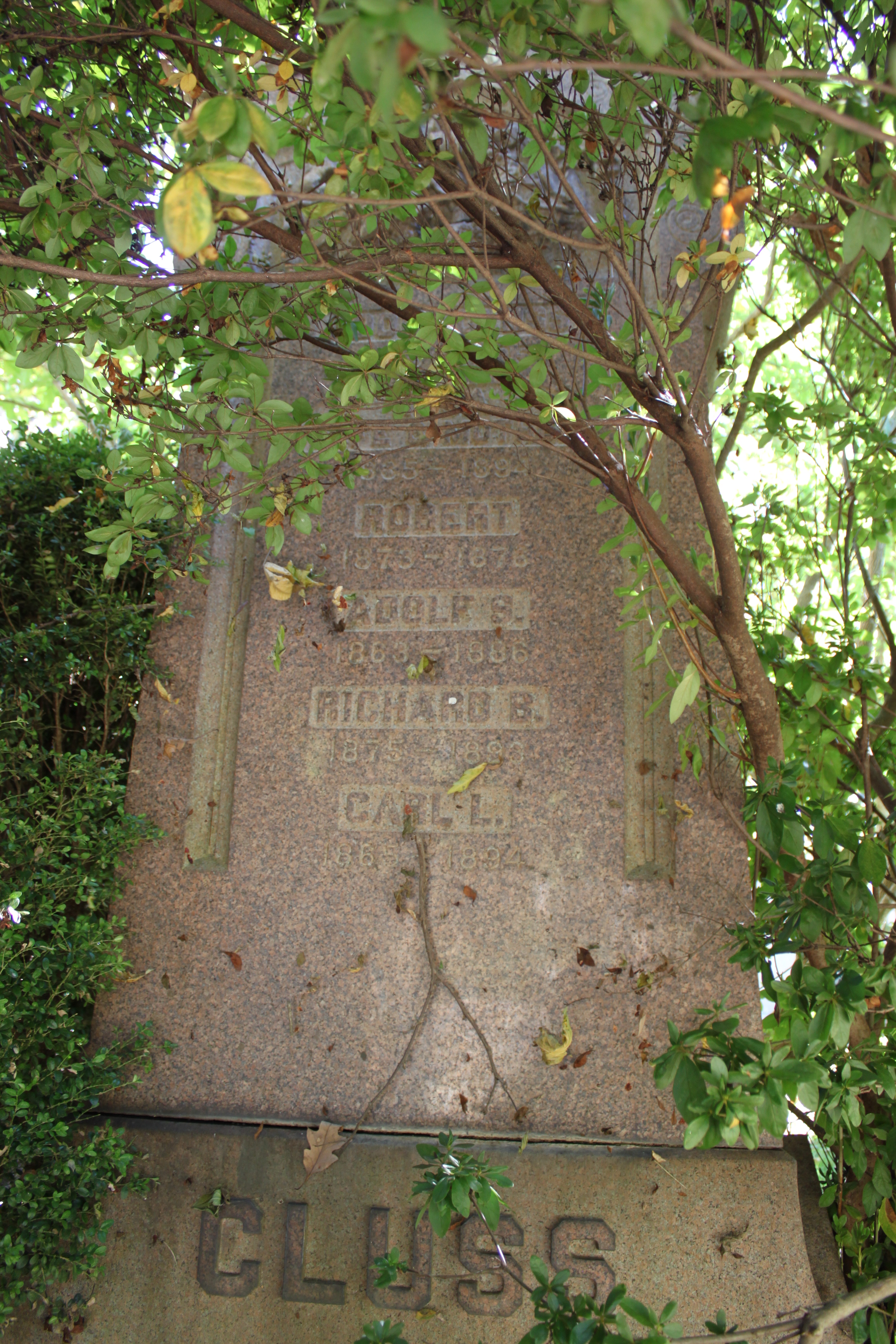
Grave of Cluss at Oak Hill Cemetery

Adolf Cluss died on July 24, 1905, in Washington, D.C., at the age of 80 years. He is buried in Oak Hill Cemetery (Plot: Van Ness, Lot 161 East).

Cluss was a Turner.

== Interviews and publications ==
- November 13, 1872: Our Modes of Building – Evening Star. Opinion of Architect Cluss on mansard roofs and the risque of fire following the Great Boston Fire of 1872.
- May 1875: Modern Street – Pavements – Popular Science Monthly.
- October 1876: Architecture and Architects at the Capital of the United States from its Foundation until 1875 – The American Architect and Building News (Supplement) presented at the Tenth Annual Convention of the American Institute of Architects on October 11, 1876, in Philadelphia, PA.
- October 1888: Mortars and Concretes of Antiquity and Modern Times – The Inland Architect and News Record (October 1888), Building Budget (October 1888) and Building (November 10, 1888). Presented but not read at the 22nd Annual Convention of the American Institute of Architects in Buffalo, NY from October 17 to October 19, 1888.
- November 1898: Professor W. C. Sabine of Harvard University presented a paper title Acoustics followed by a communication by Adolf Cluss at the 32nd Annual Convention of the American Institute of Architects in Washington, DC.

== Legacy ==
Today, several buildings designed and built by Adolf Cluss still stand in the Washington, D.C., area:

- Calvary Baptist Church
- Eastern Market
- Franklin School
- Sumner School
- Metropolitan Hook & Ladder Company Fire Engine House – 438 Massachusetts Avenue, NW
- Smithsonian Institution, Arts and Industries Building
- Masonic Temple
- Alexandria City Hall

In 2005, after a ceremonial resolution by the DC Council, DC Mayor Anthony A. Williams made a proclamation that 2005 would be "Adolf Cluss Year" from July 2005 to June 2006. Joint exhibitions would be presented in Washington, D.C., at the Charles Sumner School Museum and at the Stadtarchiv in his birthplace of Heilbronn, Germany. Both exhibits closed but a website remains: Adolf-Cluss.org

A small street in Washington, D.C., was named in his honor: Adolf Cluss Court. It connects C St SE to D St SE between 12th Street SE and 13th St SE. 38°53′05.1″N 76°59′21.3″W

A bridge is named in his honor in his birthplace of Heilbronn, Germany over the Neckar river, at 49°08′37.2″N 9°12′59.3″E.

== Buildings ==
A descriptive list of Cluss's known buildings and an interactive map showing their locations can be found here.

While Adolf Cluss designed and built close to 90 different buildings in his career, only a few survive to this day. In green are the buildings still standing today.

=== Churches ===
Name	Dates	Location / GPS	Description	Picture
Foundry Methodist Church	Construction: 1864–66; Demolished: 1902	Northeast corner of 14th and G St NW; Washington, DC; 38°53′54.7″N 77°01′54.0″W	This church designed by Cluss and Kammerhueber was to replace the original church built in 1815. Due to the Civil War, iron and lumber were in shortage leading to a slower progress in construction and doubling the cost of construction. This was an auditorium church which had become popular among Protestant churches after 1850. This allowed for good acoustics, a space for organs and choirs along with unobstructed view of the altar. It was two-stories high to fully utilize the space. The Sanctuary was on second floor while the ground floor had Bible Study rooms and Sunday School classrooms. A similar model can be seen in his other churches: Calvary Baptist Church, St. Stephen's Roman Catholic Church, and Chapel of St. Paul. With the area becoming more commercial, the congregation sold the building in 1902 to move to their new church on 16th and P S NW and it was demolished the same year. Today stands the Colorado Building on the old Foundry Methodist Church site.	
Calvary Baptist Church	Construction: 1865–66	777 8th Street, NW; Washington, DC; 38°53′58.7″N 77°01′21.8″W		
Saint Stephen Martyr Catholic Church	Construction: 1866–68; Demolished: 1959	2436 Pennsylvania Ave NW; Washington, DC; 38°54′11.8″N 77°03′10.8″W		
Tabernacle Church	Construction: 1881–82; Demolished: 1959	202 9th St SW (9th St & B St, SW); Washington, DC; 38°53′14.6″N 77°01′25.4″W		
Universalist Church of Our Father	Construction: 1882; Demolished: 1973	Southeast corner of 13th & L St, NW; Washington, DC; 38°54′13.0″N 77°01′45.9″W		
Chapel of Saint Paul	Construction: 1886; Demolished: 1950	1419 V St NW; Washington, DC; 38°55′05.8″N 77°02′03.3″W	Today it is occupied by St Augustine's Church.	

=== Markets ===
Name	Dates	Location / GPS	Description	Picture
Center Market (1864)	Partial Construction: 1864; Demolished: 1865	Pennsylvania Avenue between 7th and 9th Streets, NW; Washington, DC; 38°53′35.1″N 77°01′22.7″W	In 1863, Mayor Richard Wallach had Adolf Cluss and Joseph Wildrich von Kammerhueber design a brick structure on B Street NW (Constitution Avenue). A two-story building was designed and construction started. By June 1864, a unanimous vote from both the members of the House of Representatives District Committee and then the entire House of Representatives stopped the project as Congress had not authorized the building. It was torn down but the walls were already up and showed what a modern market could look like.	
Center Market (1871)	Construction: 1871–78; Additions by Cluss: 1886; Demolished: 1931	Between B St (now Constitution Ave) and Pennsylvania Ave – between 7th and 9th St, NW; Washington, DC; 38°53′35.1″N 77°01′22.7″W	The Center Market building was chartered by Congress on May 20, 1870, and opened for business on July 1, 1872. At the time of its construction, it was the largest market hall in the country (57,500 square feet)—large enough to supply the rapidly growing urban population of D.C. with fresh groceries. The market was built without alleys or driveways for traffic in the hoped of encouraging customers to stroll leisurely around the market. The building had three wings connected to one another with a total of 666 stalls: the 7th Street Wing which ran parallel to 7th Street NW (stalls 1 to 155); the B Street Wing which ran parallel to B Street NW connecting the 7th Street Wing to the 9th Street Wing (stalls 156 to 511); the 9th Street Wing which ran parallel to 9th Street NW (stalls 512 to 666); All the buildings were two stories high and the 7th Street Wing and the 9th Street Wing were both flanked with two towers and a metal awning over the main entrances. Another metal awning ran the entire length of B Street NW and 9th Street NW. These protected shoppers visiting the outdoors stalls. For a small fee, street dealers could place their stands outside, under the market canopy.	
Eastern Market	Construction: 1872–73; Restoration: 2007–2009	225 7th SE; Washington, DC; 38°53′11.8″N 76°59′47.4″W		

=== Schools ===
Name	Dates	Location / GPS	Description	Picture
Wallach School	Construction: 1864; Demolished: 1950	Northeast corner of 7th and D St SE, off of Pennsylvania Ave SE; Washington, DC; 38°53′05.4″N 76°59′44.1″W	Cluss and Kammerhueber's first project. It was located a block from his future market project: Eastern Market.	
Franklin School	Construction: 1865–69	13th and K Street NW; Washington, DC; 38°54′8″N 77°1′47″W		
O Street School (2nd Story)	Construction: 1871; Demolished: 1951	429 O St NW (between 4th and 5th St NW); Washington, DC; 38°54′31.4″N 77°1′03.0″W		
Seaton School	Construction: 1871; Demolished: 1969	I St NW between 2nd and 3rd St NW; Washington, DC		
Charles Sumner School	Construction: 1871–72; Renovated: 1986	17th and M St NW; Washington, DC; 38°54′21″N 77°2′18″W	The Charles Sumner School was one of the first schools for African-Americans in Washington, DC. It was built on land previously belonging to the Freedmen's Bureau. By the 1980s, the building has fallen in disrepair. With the $5 million raised by the citizens of the District, the building was renovated and became a museum.	
William Cranch School	Construction: 1872; Demolished: after 1949	Southwest corner of 12th and G St SE; Washington, DC; 38°52′52.0″N 76°59′25.7″W		
Jefferson School	Construction: 1872–73; Burned and rebuilt: 1882; Demolished: 1960	6th St and Virginia Ave SW; Washington, DC		
Curtis School	Construction: 1875; Demolished: 1951	O St NW between 32nd and 33rd St NW; Washington, DC		
Henry School	Construction: 1880; Demolished	6th and 7th St NW; Washington, DC		
The Academy of the Visitation	Construction: 1877; Demolished: 1923	Connecticut Ave NW between L and DeSales St NW; Washington, DC		
St. Matthew's Institute	Construction: 1866; Demolished: 1905	1424 K St NW; Washington, DC		
St. John's College	Construction: 1880; Tower addition: 1889; Demolished: 1960	Thomas Circle; Vermont Ave NW between M and N St NW; Washington, DC		
Lincoln School (Consultation for repairs)	Plans for repairs: 1871; Demolished	2nd and C St SE; Washington, DC		

=== Federal buildings ===
Name	Dates	Location / GPS	Description	Picture
United States Department of Agriculture Building	Construction: 1867–68; Demolished: 1930	The Mall; Reservation No. 2 between 14th and 12th Street SW; Washington, DC; 38°53′18″N 77°01′47″W	Adolf Cluss built the first building for the US Department of Agriculture five years after its creation in 1862. $100,000 had been appropriate in 1866 by Congress. It was to be built on Reservation No. 2 (between 14th and 12th Street SW) on the mall between the Washington Memorial Grounds and the Smithsonian Buildings. It was to be 172 feet by 61 1/2 feet, two stories high with a basement and be fire-proof. It would be made of pressed bricks with a sandstone base. On the west side of the building a conservatory was built in the same alignment along with other smaller buildings on the south. The areas on the north and south of the building were landscaped into a Victorian garden and arboretum between 1867 and 1879 and crops were being planted on the south side. After the Washington City Canal was filled in 1871 (based on Cluss' reports), the propagating garden closed. In exchanged, four acres previously used by the canal were acquired. It was demolished in 1930 after a new building for the department was built to the south and so the building could be torn down to fulfill the McMillan Plan in a similar manner to Center Market down the Mall.	
Richards Building (United States Coast and Geodetic Survey)	Construction: 1871; Demolished: 1929	205 New Jersey Ave SE; Washington, DC; 38°53′13.6″N 77°00′30.7″W	Adolf Cluss had worked for the Survey, then known as the United States Coast Survey, when he had first moved to Washington, D.C. He had worked in a building that was falling apart at the time. In 1870, he was given the opportunity to design four buildings spanning between New Jersey Ave SE and South Capitol St SE on Capitol Hill: two five-story buildings (the Main Building and the Back Building) and two smaller ones. The first two were equipped with elevators connecting all the floors and were connected with brick stairs and walkways. The Main Building was partially underground due to the hill configuration. Cluss used the round arch style (known as Rundbogenstil) to craft the red brick building with brown stone trim. The slate roof had red, blue and green patterns which were in sharp contrast with the classically styled Capitol Building and other Federal buildings around. In 1929, the agency moved to the new Department of Commerce Building in the Federal Triangle between Pennsylvania & Constitution Avenues NW and 14th & 6th Street NW. The Richards Building was demolished and Congress claimed the site to build the Longworth House Office Building for the House of Representatives in 1933.	
Old Patent Office Building (Reconstruction) Today: National Portrait Gallery and Smithsonian American Art Museum	Reconstruction: 1877–78	Between F & G St NW and 7th & 9th St NW; Washington, DC; 38.89778°N 77.022936°W		
U.S. Fish Commission	Construction: 1881; Demolished: 1950s	1443 Massachusetts Ave NW; Washington, DC; 38°54′23.5″N 77°01′59.4″W		

=== Military commissions ===
Name	Dates	Location / GPS	Description	Picture
Powder Magazines for the Navy Yard	Construction: between 1859 and 1864; Demolished	Washington Navy Yard; Washington, DC		
Powder Magazines for the US Arsenal	Construction: between 1861 and 1864; Demolished	US Arsenal (Fort Lesley J. McNair); 4th, One-Half and P St SW; Washington, DC		
New Ordnance Foundry	Construction: 1863–64; Demolished	Washington Navy Yard; 8th and M St SE; Washington, DC; 38°52′26.5″N 76°59′49.9″W	While working for the Ordnance Department, Cluss was tasked with drafting gun design during the Civil War. It is at that time that he designed his first building: the New Ordnance Foundry. Designed in 1860, it was to house the armory as well as to manufacture modern high-power guns. It contained 18 furnaces and made of bricks and iron. It was estimated to have cost $150,000 and was revolutionary in the sense that "No other foundry in the country [is] adapted to casting guns above ground." In 1889, Cluss compiled a list of his buildings including a mention of "numerous buildings at the US Navy Yard, Washington [, DC]". Some have been identified, others have not yet. Based on a map of the Navy Yard of 1881, it was building # 36. Today it would be located in the middle of the block between Isaac Hull Ave SE and Patterson Ave SE, between Tingey St SE and Sicard St SE.	
US Arsenal: Officers Barracks (remodel of east and west wings of the penitentiary)	Remodel: 1869; West building demolished: 1903	US Arsenal (Fort Lesley J. McNair); 4th, One-Half and P St SW; Washington, DC		
Officer's Quarters at Washington Barracks; Today: Building 21	Construction: 1885	US Arsenal (Fort Lesley J. McNair); 4th, One-Half and P St SW; Washington, DC; 38°51′56.9″N 77°01′00.7″W		

=== Local governments ===
Name	Dates	Location / GPS	Description	Picture
Metropolitan Hook & Ladder Company Fire Engine House; City of Washington	Construction: 1863–64; Restored: 2001	438 Massachusetts Avenue, NW; Washington, DC; 38°54′0.7″N 77°1′2.2″W	One of only eleven known Adolf Cluss still standing. Dedicated in February 1864, it was home of the Metropolitan Hook & Ladder 1. It later became home to Engine Company 6. It was decommissioned in 1974 as a firehouse and left abandoned until 2001. It was converted as a restaurant. In June 2010, it was discovered to be a Cluss building. The building is two stories, 30 feet in width, and 60 feet deep. The first story is 11 feet high to be occupied by the engines with bunks for six people in the back. The two main doors are 16 ft by 7 ft with a small door in between to access the main hall via a spiral staircase. The 2nd story was 17 ft high and intended as the meeting-room with a light iron gallery for an orchestra and illuminated with chandeliers. Originally, an 11 ft belfry was above the structure but was removed in 1877. Above the door, one can see a piece of marble-work executed by W. Flannery, representing a fire-hat, with ladders, hooks, &c	
Police Station House (Metropolitan Police Station), Precinct 8 City of Washington	Construction: 1863; Demolished: early 1900s	500 E Street, SE; Washington, DC; 38°53′00.4″N 76°59′57.3″W		
Alexandria City Hall	Construction: 1871–73	Between Cameron & King St and Mt. Royal & Fairfax St; Alexandria, VA; 38°48′18″N 77°2′37″W		

=== Hospitals and homes ===
Name	Dates	Location / GPS	Description	Picture
Garfield Memorial Hospital (New Wing)	Construction: 1886; Demolished	10th St between Boundary St (Florida Ave) & Sherman Ave NW; Washington, DC; 38°55′15.5″N 77°1′34.2″W		
Smallpox Hospital	Construction: 1872; Demolished	1900 Massachusetts Ave SE; Washington, DC; 38°53′7.9″N 76°58′26.1″W		
St. Aloysius Church Industrial Home for Women	Construction: 1871; Demolished: ca. 1970	Northeast corner of K and North Capitol St NE; Washington, DC; 38°54′09.6″N 77°00′31.7″W		
Washington Hospital for Foundlings; Renamed: Washington Home for Foundlings	Construction: 1899–1900; Demolished	Bethesda, MD		

=== Museums ===
Name	Dates	Location / GPS	Description	Picture
Smithsonian Institution Building (Reconstruction) known as the "Smithsonian Castle"	Renovations: 1867, 1883–84, 1887–88	The Mall; Washington, DC; 38°53′19.49″N 77°1′33.59″W		Smithsonian Building NR
The National Museum renamed: Smithsonian Institution, Arts and Industries Building	Construction: 1879–81	900 Jefferson Drive SW; Washington, DC; 38°53′17.34″N 77°1′28.18″W	It was built farther back from the Mall than the Smithsonian Castle in order to avoid obstructing the view of the Castle from the US Capitol. The building is composed of four pavilions, one at each corner, about 40 feet (12 m) square and three stories tall. These surround a central rotunda. Lower sections or "ranges" were placed outside the pavilions.	
Army Medical Museum and Library	Construction: 1886; Demolished: 1969	The Mall; Washington, DC; 38°53′19.49″N 77°1′33.59″W	The building was built to house the Army Medical Museum, the Library of the Surgeon General's Office (later called the Army Medical Library), and some of the Army's medical records. Between 1893 and 1910, it also housed the Army Medical School. It was affectionately nicknamed "Old Red" or "The Old Pickle Factory". It was razed and replaced by the Smithsonian's Hirshhorn Museum and Sculpture Garden in 1969.	

=== Commercial and office buildings ===
Name	Dates	Location / GPS	Description	Picture
Thomas Brown Office	Construction: 1878; Demolished	1413 F St NW; Washington, DC; 38°53′50.8″N 77°1′57.6″W	Thomas Brown was a contractor for Adolf cluss on the Patent Office, the National Museum, the Portland Flats and the "Smithsonian Castle".	
John M. Young Store and Residence (C Street NW)	Construction: 1885; Demolished	429 C St NW; Washington, DC; 38°53′37.3″N 77°1′03.3″W	John M. Young was a carriage manufacturer and salesman which he sold from his building on C Street NW. A successful businessman, he was able to invest in real estate including two other properties designed by Cluss on Pennsylvania Ave NW and on 7th St NW.	
John M. Young Stores and Residences (7th Street NW)	Construction 1883; Demolished	1502-1506 7th St NW; Washington, DC; 38°54′35.0″N 77°1′19.6″W	This was one of John M. Young's commercial-residential properties. It was a three-unit row at 7th St NW and P St NW with stores on the ground floor and residential space above. It stood across from the Henry School also designed by Adolf Cluss.	
John M. Young Store and Residence (Pennsylvania Avenue NW)	Construction: 1879; Demolished: 1941	475 Pennsylvania Ave NW; Washington, DC; 38°53′31.6″N 77°1′00.5″W	This was the first building designed by Cluss and Schulze for John M. Young on the prestigious Pennsylvania Avenue. It was demolished with several other buildings to build the new DC central library in 1941.	
Lansburgh's Department Store (7th Street NW)	Construction 1882 replaced by a newer building	420-426 7th St NW; Washington, DC; 38°53′43.6″N 77°1′19.3″W	Gustave and James Lansburgh were two brothers whose parents had immigrated from Hamburg, Germany. They started a retail business in Baltimore, MD and opened their first store in Washington, D.C., in 1861 on 7th St NW between K and I St NW. In 1882, Adolf Cluss designed a new store four blocks south of the original DC store. It was built at a cost of $300,000 and had the first commercial elevator in Washington. In 1884, john L. Vogt, a German immigrant, baker and neighbor of the Lansburgh brothers commissioned Cluss for the construction of 426 7th St NW. He proceeded in renting the building to them as an extension to their store. The Lansburgh were said to be longtime friends of the Cluss family and the Daw family in which his daughter married into according to Adolf Cluss' great-grandson.	
Lansburgh's Department Store (8th Street NW)	Construction: 1885; Demolished	417 8th Street NW; Washington, DC; 38°53′44″N 77°1′22.3″W	The two-story building was designed by Cluss and Schulze right being their 7th St store. It is believed to have been used as a warehouse or shipping and receiving department. It connected to the 7th St building by an alley.	
John L. Vogt Store	Construction: 1884; Demolished	426 7th St NW; Washington, DC; 38°53′44.4″N 77°1′19.4″W	John L. Vogt was a German immigrant and baker with several bakeries around the city who specialized in "cakes and fancy baking". He was able to invest in real estate and financed this building designed by Cluss in 1884 before renting it to the Lansburgh brothers. Both the Lansburgh and Vogt building were designed to match.	
Corcoran Office Building (Addition)	Construction: 1885; Demolished: 1917	East side of 15th St NW between Pennsylvania Ave NW and F St NW; Washington, DC; 38°53′48.8″N 77°2′00.8″W	The building was designed by Renwick and Sands of New York in 1875. In 1885, Cluss and Schulze were hired by banker William W. Corcoran to design a "columnade' for the entrance located on 15th St and to reconstruct the stairway. Cluss and Schulze maintained an office in the building in the 1880s. This was a popular place for Washington's artists to rent studios and teach art classes.	
Montgomery Meigs Office	Construction: 1882; Demolished	1318 N St NW; Washington, DC		
Samuel Herman Store and Residence (# 415)	Construction: 1866; Demolished	415 4 1/2 St SW; Washington, DC		
Joseph P. Herman Store and Residence (#324)	Construction: 1870; Demolished: 1930s	324 4 1/2 St SW; Washington, DC		
Samuel Herman Stores and Residences (#323–327)	Constructed: 1870; Demolished: ca. 1900	323-327 4 1/2 St SW; Washington, DC		
Wolford and Shilberg Store	Construction: 1871; Demolished: 1950s	437 7th St SW; Washington, DC		

=== Hotels and boarding houses ===
Name	Dates	Location / GPS	Description	Picture
Seaton House (extension)	Construction: 1867; Demolished: 1923	622 Louisiana Ave NW (now Indiana Ave NW); Washington, DC; 38°53′38.2″N 77°01′16.8″W	Cluss and Kammerhueber designed the six-story addition to the existing hotel owned by John H. Semmes. It was 6,000 square feet and valued at $150,000 in 1902. It is considered to be Cluss' largest commercial project. It later housed postal facilities and at the end of its life, Central Union Mission.	
John A. Gray's Hotel	Construction: 1868; Demolished: before 1927	920 15th St NW; Washington, DC; 38°54′06.3″N 77°02′04.8″W	It was renamed as the McPherson House in 1879 and as the Buckingham's Hotel in 1894 when it was remodeled and enlarged.	
Welcker's Hotel (6 story extension)	Extension: 1884; Demolished: 1906	721-727 15th St NW; Washington, DC; 38°53′57.2″N 77°01′59.0″W	John Welcker was a German immigrant living in New York. He moved to Washington, D.C., in 1861 with the New York troops in the beginning of the Civil War. In 1862, he owned Buhler's Restaurant (322 Pennsylvania Ave NW) and changed its name in 1865 to the Welcker's Restaurant. The restaurant moved to 721-727 15th Street NW prior to 1870. In 1875, he died and his widow took over the business and remarrying with Theophilus Felter, Welcker's partner. Felter contracted with Cluss and Schultze in 1884 to build a six-story extension. It continued until after 1890 under the same name and was considered one of the finest restaurants in Washington, DC.	

=== Halls ===
Name	Dates	Location / GPS	Description	Picture
Concordia Opera House	Construction: 1864–65; Burned down: 1891	379 West Baltimore St; Baltimore, MD; 39°17′21.5″N 76°37′15.1″W		
YMCA Building (containing the Lincoln Hall auditorium)	Construction: 1867; Burned down: 1886	Northeast corner of 9th and D St NW; Washington, DC; 38°53′41.7″N 77°01′26.0″W		
Masonic Temple (Today: Julius Lansburgh Furniture Co., Inc.)	Construction: 1868–70	910 F St NW; Washington, DC; 38°53′49.9″N 77°1′26.3″W		
Schützenpark Meeting Hall and Hotel	Construction: 1873 as addition to a hotel Reconstruction by Adolf Cluss after a fire: 1880; Demolished	7th St NW (Georgia Ave NW) near Hobart St NW; Washington, DC		
Naval Masonic Lodge (Remodel)	Remodel with additions: 1867; Demolished	5th St SE and Virginia Ave SE; Washington, DC		

=== Residential ===
Name	Dates	Location / GPS	Description	Picture
William Stickney Residence	Construction: 1868; Demolished: 1970s	Northwest corner of 6th and M St NW; Washington, DC; 38°54′20.7″N 77°01′12.2″W		
Franklin Terrace Row Houses	Construction: 1869; Demolished: between 1890 and 1934	K St NW between 14th St NW and Vermont Ave NW; Washington, DC		
Shepherd's Row	Construction: 1873; Demolished: 1952	1701-1705 K St NW; Washington, DC; 38°54′09.8″N 77°02′19.5″W		
Fanny Washburn Payson Residence	Construction: 1873–74; Demolished: 1920s	1439 K St NW; Washington, DC; 38°54′09.7″N 77°02′02.5″W		
Stewart's Castle	Construction: 1873; Fire: 1879; Demolished: 1901	Dupont Circle between Massachusetts and Connecticut Ave NW; Washington, DC; 38°54′36″N 77°02′38″W		
Samuel Carter Residence	Construction: 1878–79; Demolished: 1912	1316 Connecticut Ave NW; Washington, DC; 38°54′28.5″N 77°02′33.7″W		
Phillips Row	Construction: 1878; Demolished: 1948	1302-1314 Connecticut Ave NW; Washington, DC; 38°54′27.0″N 77°02′32.8″W		
Edward Weston Residence	Construction: 1878; Demolished: 1950	1426 K St NW; Washington, DC; 38°54′08.6″N 77°01′59.9″W		
Mary Biddle Residence	Construction: 1878; Demolished: 1950s	1447 Massachusetts Ave NW; Washington, DC; 38°54′23.0″N 77°02′0.0″W		
Spencer F. Baird Residence	Construction: 1878–80; Demolished	1445 Massachusetts Ave NW; Washington, DC; 38°54′23.2″N 77°02′0.8″W		
Portland Flats	Construction: 1880; Addition: 1883; Demolished: 1962	Thomas Circle; 1125-1133 Vermont Ave NW; Washington, DC; 38°54′16.6″N 77°01′56.7″W		
Walter Davidge Residence	Construction: 1880; Demolished: 1942	Southeast corner of 17th and H St NW; Washington, DC; 38°54′0.4″N 77°02′21.5″W		
Thomas Ferguson Residence	Construction: 1881; Demolished: 1959	1435 Massachusetts Ave NW; Washington, DC; 38°54′22.9″N 77°01′59.8″W		
Christian Heurich worker houses	Construction: 1885; Demolished	1925-1931 M Street NW; Washington, DC; 38°54′20.6″N 77°02′40.3″W		
John Smith Residence	Construction: 1886; Demolished	1721 Lanier Ave NW; Washington, DC; 38°55′32.8″N 77°02′25.1″W		
Henry H. Wells Jr. Residence	Constructed in 1887	428-430 M St NW; Washington, DC; 38°54′20″N 77°01′02.9″W		
William Wuerdemann Residence	Construction: 1887; Demolished: ca. 1910	200 1/2 Delaware Ave and B St NE; Washington, DC; 38°53′32.2″N 77°00′29.7″W		
John R. Elvans Residence	Construction: 1866; Demolished: ca. 1960	928 M St NW; Washington, DC; 38°54′20.1″N 77°01′31.7″W		
Thomas Ferguson Row Houses	Construction: 1882; Demolished	1428-1434 N St NW; Washington, DC; 38°54′25.9″N 77°01′59.7″W		
George B. Loring Residences	Construction: 1879; Demolished	1521-1523 K St NW; Washington, DC; 38°54′25.9″N 77°01′59.7″W		
William S. Hoge Residence	Construction: 1885; Demolished	1402 15th St NW; Washington, DC; 38°54′31.8″N 77°02′04.8″W		
Katherine McCarthy Residence	Construction: 1885; Demolished	917 15th St NW; Washington, DC; 38°54′06.2″N 77°02′04.8″W		
C. A. Schneider Residences	Construction: 1885; Demolished	1908-1910 I St NW; Washington, DC; 38°54′04.6″N 77°02′38.1″W		
William F. Mattingly and Michael W. Beveridge Residences	Constructed: 1870; Demolished: 1930s	1616-1618 H St NW; Washington, DC; 38°54′00.5″N 77°02′19.6″W		
John K. Wills Residences	Construction: 1870; Demolished: 1940s	1013-1015 14th St NW; Washington, DC; 38°54′10.5″N 77°01′54.7″W		
General Noah L. Jeffries Residence	Construction: 1871; Demolished: ca. 1922	1505 K St NW; Washington, DC; 38°54′09.7″N 77°02′07″W		
Edward F. Droop House (Renovation)	Renovation: 1883; Demolished 1918	726-728 12th St NW; Washington, DC; 38°53′57.6″N 77°01′41.6″W		

=== Others ===
Name	Dates	Location / GPS	Description	Picture
Stanford Stable	Construction: 1886; Demolished: ca. 1920–21	South side of L St NW between 18th and 19th St NW; Washington, DC; 38°54′13.2″N 77°02′33.6″W		
Ulysses S. Grant Inaugural Ball Building (temporary structure)	Construction: 1873; Demolished	Judiciary Square; Washington, DC		
Martin Luther Memorial (Pedestal)	Construction: 1884	Thomas Circle; 1226 Vermont Ave NW; Washington, DC; 38°54′23.5″N 77°01′54.1″W		

=== Construction oversight ===
Adolf Cluss took some projects as a builder (general contractor) designed by other architects.

Name	Dates	Location / GPS	Description	Picture
District of Columbia Jail	Construction: 1872; Demolished: 1976	Southeast corner of East Capitol St and 19th St SE; Washington, DC; 38°53′21.2″N 76°58′36.3″W		
United States Government Printing Office (Addition on G St NE)	Construction of the addition: 1895–96	Northwest corner of North Capitol and G St NW; Washington, DC; 38°53′57.1″N 77°00′34.1″W		
White House Conservancy and Greenhouse Repairs	Repairs: 1896–1897; Conservancy demolished 1902	The White House; 1600 Pennsylvania Avenue, NW; Washington, DC; 38°53′51.8″N 77°02′14.0″W		
Hearst School for Girls; Renamed: National Cathedral School for Girls	Construction: 1899–1900	3612 Woodley Rd NW; Washington, DC; 38°55′53.3″N 77°04′20.4″W		Drawing, Hearst School for Girls- The Elevation of the Main Building, 1899–1900 (CH 18570145-2)
