= Thomas Circle =

Traffic circle in Washington, D.C., U.S.

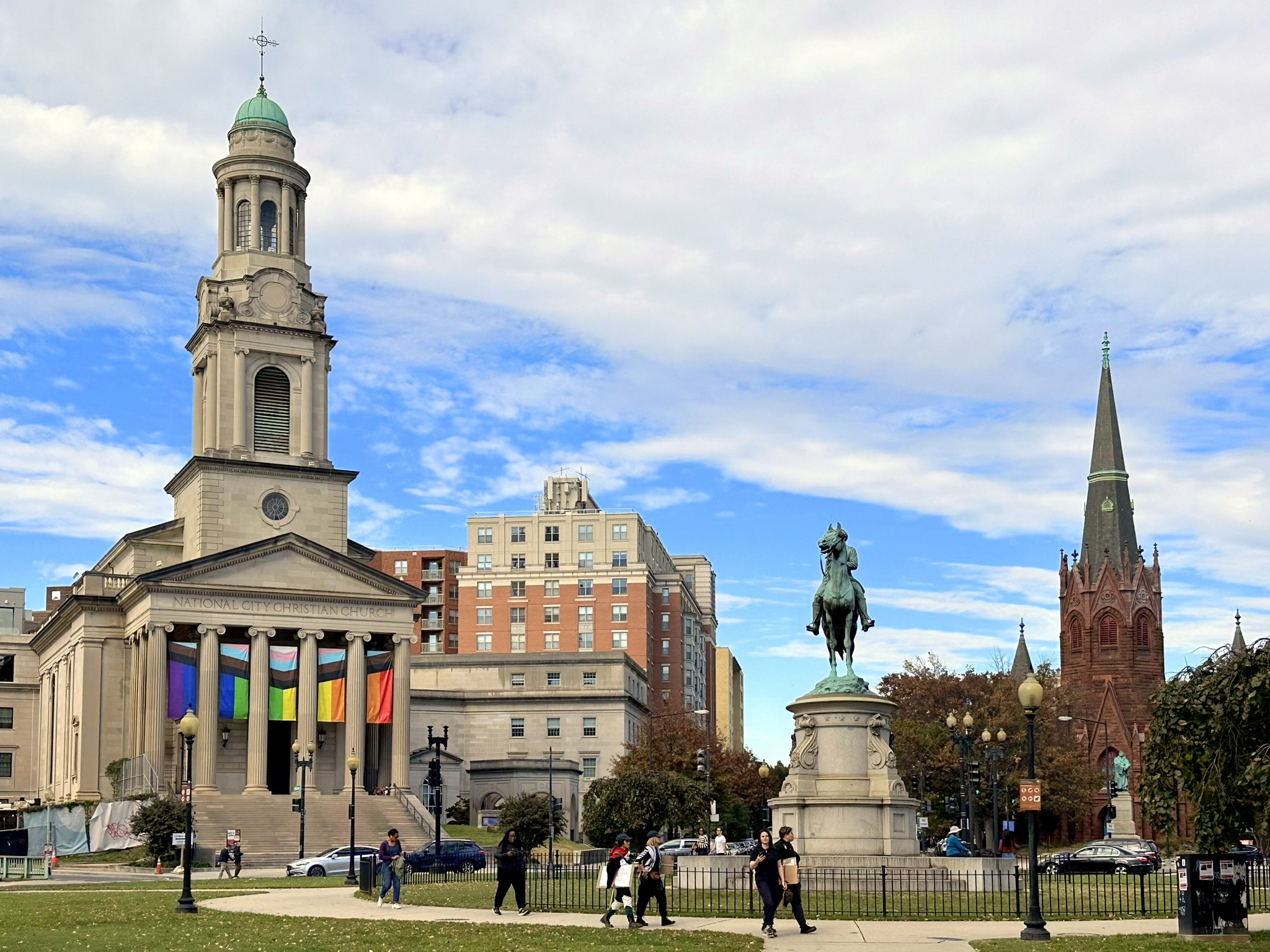
- Facing north across Thomas Circle towards National City Christian Church, Luther Place Memorial Church, and in the foreground, the equestrian statue of George Henry Thomas
- Interactive map of Thomas Circle

Location
- Logan Circle, Northwest, Washington, D.C.
- Coordinates: 38.90566°N 77.03196°W
- Roads at junction: 14th Street, M Street, Massachusetts Avenue, Vermont Avenue NW

Construction
- Type: Traffic circle
- Maintained by: DDOT

Thomas Circle is a traffic circle in Northwest Washington, D.C., United States. It is located at the intersection of 14th Street, M Street, Massachusetts Avenue, and Vermont Avenue NW. A portion of Massachusetts Avenue travels through a tunnel underneath the circle. The interior of the circle includes the equestrian statue of George Henry Thomas, a Union army general in the American Civil War.

The area around present-day Thomas Circle was included as an intersection in the 1791 L'Enfant Plan, but plans to make it a circle took place the following year. Development around the circle was slow, due to the area being in the city's "countryside." A few large houses were built around the circle before the Civil War, but major changes took place in the second half of the 19th century. The circle was improved with landscaping, a horse-drawn rail for commuters, and sewer lines. The statue of Thomas was dedicated in 1879, the same year one of the city's first apartment buildings was constructed, the Portland Flats.

During the late 19th century, the area became less desirable due to Dupont Circle and Logan Circle becoming more popular with upper-class citizens. Several of the old homes were replaced or used for non-residential purposes. The horse-drawn rail car was replaced with streetcars, allowing more people to travel north of the circle and build homes in new neighborhoods. During the first half of the 20th century, the imposing National City Christian Church was built on the northwest edge of the circle. The other church facing Thomas Circle is Luther Place Memorial Church, built in the early 1870s.

Many historic buildings, including the Wylie Mansion and Portland Flats, were replaced with office buildings and hotels. The circle itself was significantly altered in the 1950s by building new traffic islands around the statue, eliminating access to the park and statue. This was reversed in the 2000s, restoring the original design of Thomas Circle. The Lutheran church, the Thomas statue, and the circle itself are listed on the National Register of Historic Places (NRHP) and District of Columbia Inventory of Historic Sites (DCIHS). Both churches on the circle are contributing properties to the Greater Fourteenth Street Historic District.

== Geography and design ==
Thomas Circle is on Washington, D.C.'s Reservation 66, in the northwest quadrant. It is the junction of 14th Street, M Street, Massachusetts Avenue, and Vermont Avenue NW. A portion of Massachusetts Avenue passes under the circle via a tunnel. The circle is on the boundary of the city's downtown and Logan Circle neighborhoods. Scott Circle is located two blocks west.

The traffic circle measures 28,176 square feet (2,617.6 m^{2}) and its dimension is 338.93 feet (103.31 m). Since the most recent reconfiguration of Thomas Circle in 2006, there are four sidewalks leading to the center, one from each direction. The sidewalks intersect at a smaller circle that is surrounded by wrought-iron fencing, a grassy area, and the equestrian statue of George Henry Thomas. The remainder of the circle is an open grassy area, with a few trees and lampposts dotting the site.

Because of its location, which is slightly taller than the surrounding area, there are vistas looking down 14th Street, Massachusetts Avenue, and Vermont Avenue. There are four traffic islands, two on the southern side of the circle, and two on the northern side.

== History ==
=== 17th–19th centuries ===
The area where present-day Thomas Circle is located was once part of a large tract of land named Port Royal. The tract was leased to John Peerce in 1687. On March 30, 1791, ownership of the tract's areas where streets were to be built was given to the new federal government. The circle was mentioned in the 1791 L'Enfant Plan of the city's layout as No. 9, but the layout was only an intersection. The following year Andrew Ellicott released an updated map, and instead of an intersection, the area was planned to be a circle.

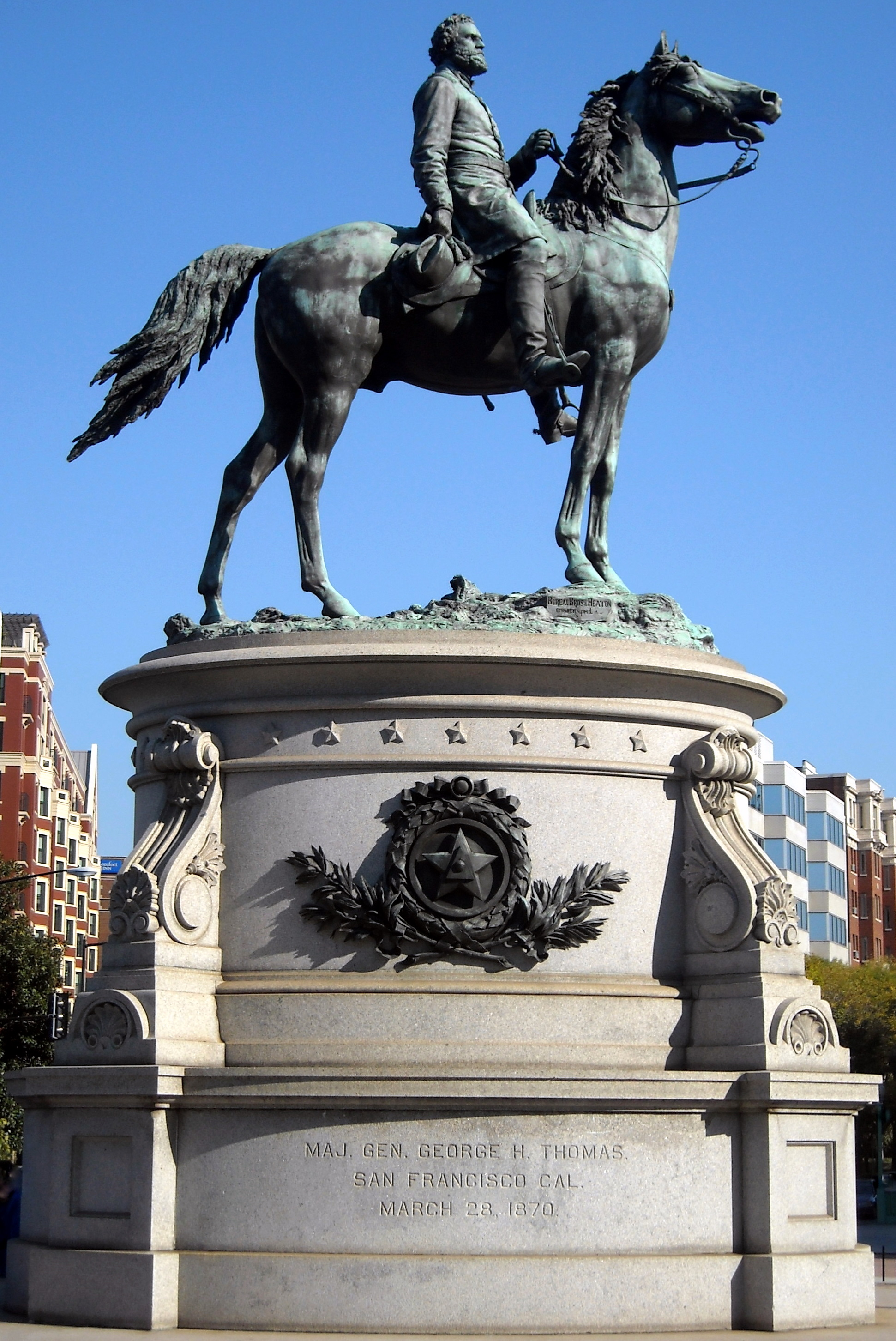
The equestrian statue of George Henry Thomas, erected in 1879

There was minimal development around the circle during the first half of the 19th century. The first large building to be constructed on the circle was on the northwest corner, the residence of Secretary of the Treasury William H. Crawford. At that time, the surrounding area was considered part of the city's countryside. In 1843, businessman Thomas Coltman built a mansion on the circle's northeast corner. The house was later owned by Andrew Wylie, an Associate Justice of the Supreme Court of the District of Columbia.

During the Civil War, one of three homes on the circle was used as a military hospital for Union troops. After the war ended in 1865, a horse-drawn railway was installed on 14th Street, leading to development around and to the north of the circle. In 1867, the Office of Public Buildings and Grounds leadership wanted to create a park in the middle of the circle. Fencing was installed around the circle, which was nicknamed Memorial Circle, due to citizens planting memorial trees. Paved roads and sewers soon followed, and the area quickly attracted wealthy residents.

In dedication of the lives lost during the war and as a symbol of peace, the ornate Luther Place Memorial Church was built on the north side of the circle in the early 1870s. By that time, in addition to fencing, the park had sidewalks, gas lamps, and shrubbery, but most of the plantings had to be removed in 1872 because they were not planted deep enough and died. During the leadership of Alexander "Boss" Shepherd, there were additional improvements to the circle and the streets surrounding it. New plants were installed after the site was excavated and replaced with high-quality soil. A fountain, outdoor furniture, and ornamental iron vases were also installed during the next several years.

In 1879, one of the city's first apartment buildings, Portland Flats, was constructed on the south side of the circle. It was designed my prominent local architect, Adolf Cluss. That same year the bronze equestrian statue of Civil War General George Henry Thomas was erected. It was sculpted by John Quincy Adams Ward and installed in the center of the park. The statue's dedication ceremony was attended by thousands of soldiers and prominent individuals, including President Rutherford B. Hayes. After installation of the statue, which is considered one of the city's best equestrian statues, Memorial Circle became Thomas Circle.

Luther Place Memorial Church installed the bronze Luther Monument in 1884, which faces the circle. The dedication ceremony was attended by thousands of people. By the 1890s, some of the homes around the circle were sold or converted to other use, including the Crawford House, which became the Norwood Institute. This occurred because Dupont Circle and Logan Circle were seen as the more fashionable areas at the time. During the same decade, the horse-drawn railway on 14th Street was replaced with an electric streetcar, leading to neighborhoods forming north of the circle.

=== 20th and 21st centuries ===
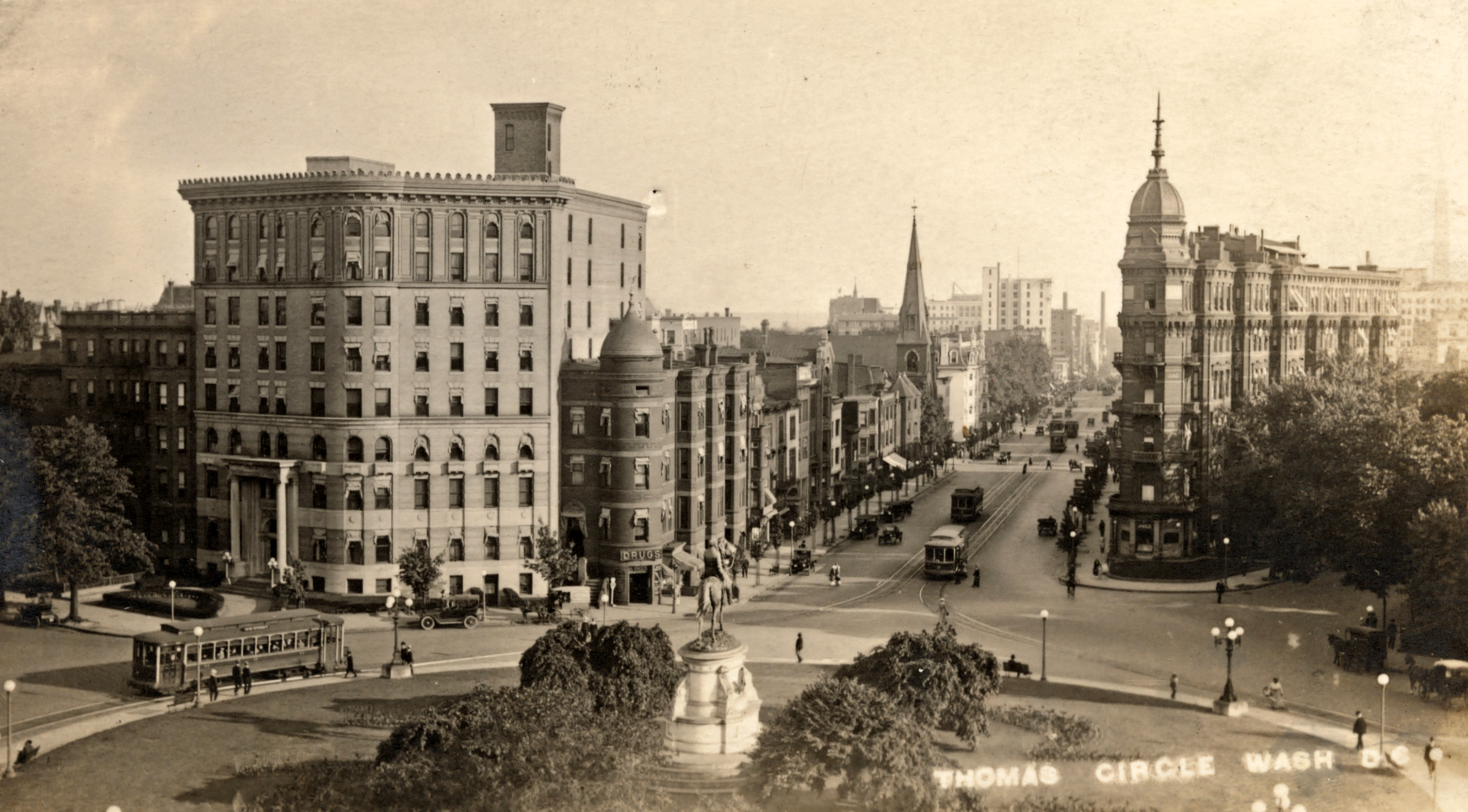
Southern view of Thomas Circle in 1916

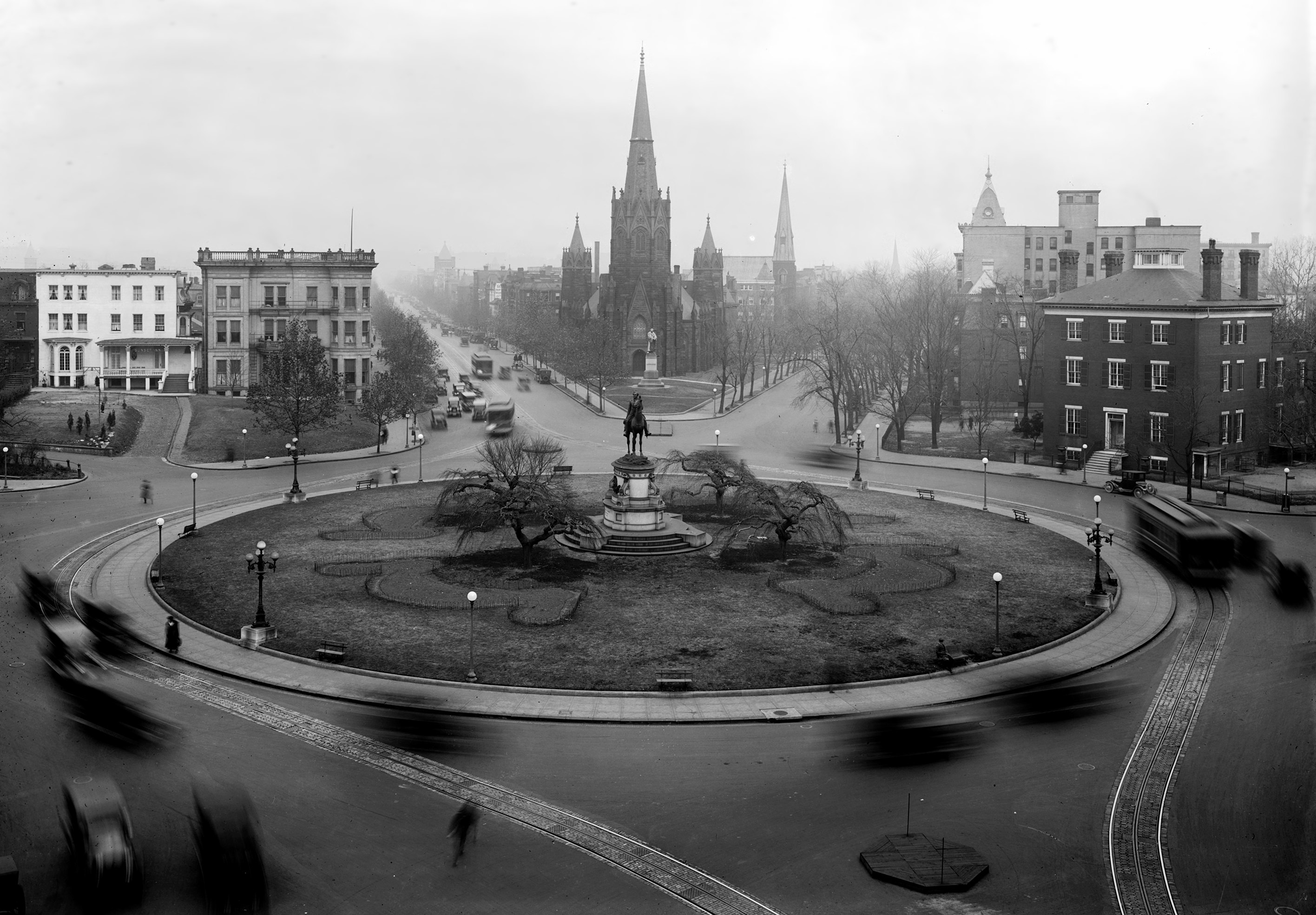
Northern view of Thomas Circle in 1922

The park in the circle was redesigned several times in the 1900s-1910s, and by the 1920s, most of the plants and trees had been removed. The ornate lamps around the statue were replaced with standard lampposts. During this period, the houses around the circle were often no longer used as residences. Owners converted them into office space, embassies, and a variety of commercial ventures. Several single-family houses were demolished and replaced with office buildings.

One positive addition to the lots surrounding the circle was the 1930 construction of the imposing National City Christian Church, designed by noted architect John Russell Pope, which is the national church of the Christian Church (Disciples of Christ). In December 1938, construction began on a $680,000 tunnel that would allow Massachusetts Avenue's through-traffic to pass under the circle. During construction of the underpass, most of the landscaping in the circle was removed. The tunnel opened on March 14, 1940. North-south running through-traffic lanes cutting through the center of the circle were added in 1952 to improve traffic flow, but left a minimal oval-shaped space around the statue which pedestrians could not access without jaywalking.

Demolition of remaining buildings continued into the mid-20th century. The Wylie House was demolished after a devastating fire in 1947. The Washington Plaza Hotel, designed by Morris Lapidus, was built on the site in the early 1960s. The Portland Flats was demolished in 1962 and replaced with a building that now serves as a hotel. A few small rowhouses and an apartment building that lined the southern portion of the circle were demolished in the 1960s-1970s. The Annie Cole House survived until 1974 when it was demolished and replaced with the National Association of Home Builders headquarters.

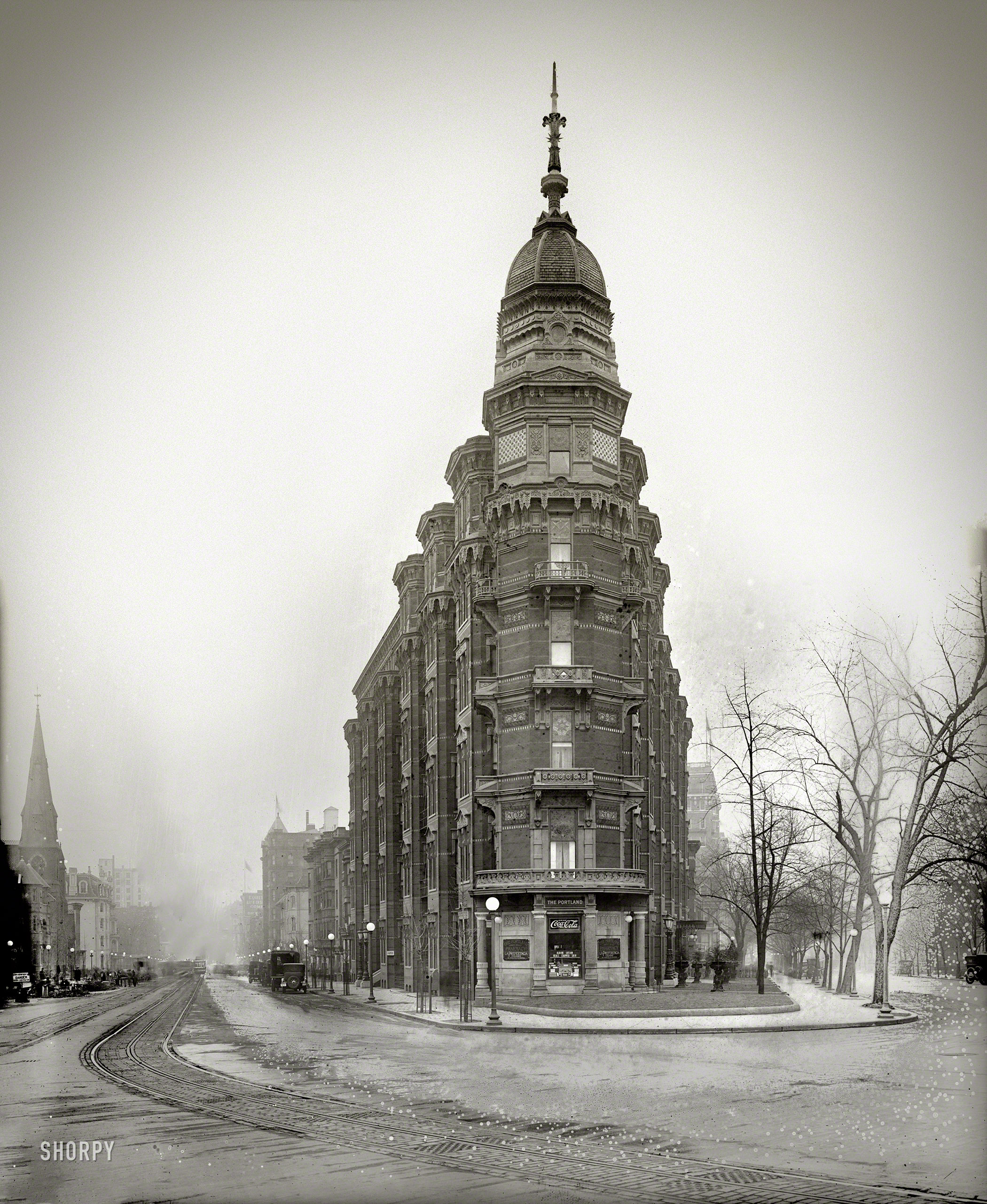
Portland Flats in 1917

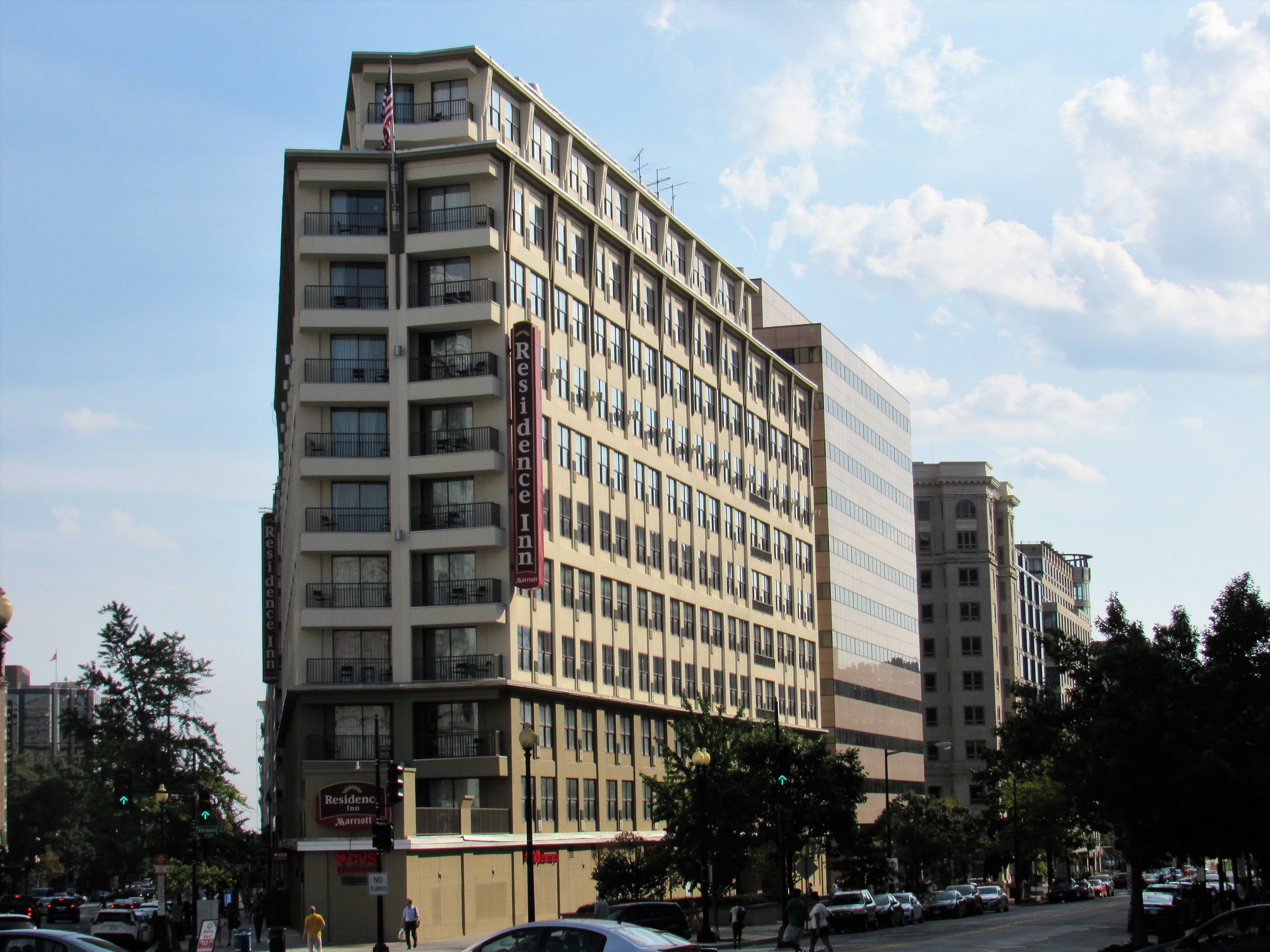
Building that replaced the Portland Flats

Historic preservation of remaining buildings took place in the second half of the 20th century. The National City Christian Church, Luther Place Memorial Church, including the statue of Luther, and the circle itself as part of the L'Enfant Plan, were added to the District of Columbia Inventory of Historic Sites (DCIHS) on November 8, 1964. The Lutheran church and statue were added to the National Register of Historic Places (NRHP) on July 16, 1973. The statue of Thomas was included in the Civil War Monuments in Washington, D.C., collective listing on the NRHP and DCIHS, on September 20, 1978, and March 3, 1979, respectively. The Greater Fourteenth Street Historic District was added to the DCIHS on May 26, 1994, and the NRHP on November 9, 1994. The 1994 designation included the Lutheran church. On April 24, 1997, the L'Enfant Plan was added to the NRHP. The Greater Fourteenth Street historic District was expanded in 2007, which included the National City Christian Church and an adjoining apartment building, on January 18 (DCIHS) and May 15 (NRHP).

In October 2006, the District Department of Transportation completed a 2.5-year, $6 million reconstruction of Thomas Circle. The project included the addition of bike lanes, pedestrian crosswalks mid-circle (which hadn't previously existed), new in-circle traffic lights, better street lighting, and new sidewalks and landscaping. The biggest change, however, came with the elimination of the 14th Street through-lanes. The circle was restored to its original design according to the L'Enfant Plan, which allowed for a larger landscaped area inside the circle. The rehabilitation of Thomas Circle won an Honorable Mention in the "Historic Preservation" category of the Federal Highway Administration's Excellence in Highway Design awards for 2006.

As of the start of the 21st century, Thomas Circle is adjacent to the southern boundary of the Greater 14th Street and Logan Circle Historic District. The circle marks the boundary between "downtown 14th Street" and the "uptown 14th Street", the latter of which is a rapidly gentrifying gay neighborhood within the city. D.C. city officials now consider Thomas Circle to be a "gateway" to the Logan Circle, Shaw, and U Street Corridor neighborhoods. In April 2014, Thomas Circle became the eastern terminus of the M Street Cycle Track. This 1.4 miles (2.3 km), west-bound only bicycling lane extends to 28th Street NW.

== See also ==
- List of circles in Washington, D.C.
