= Equestrian statue of George Henry Thomas =

Sculpture in Washington, D.C.

Major General George Henry Thomas
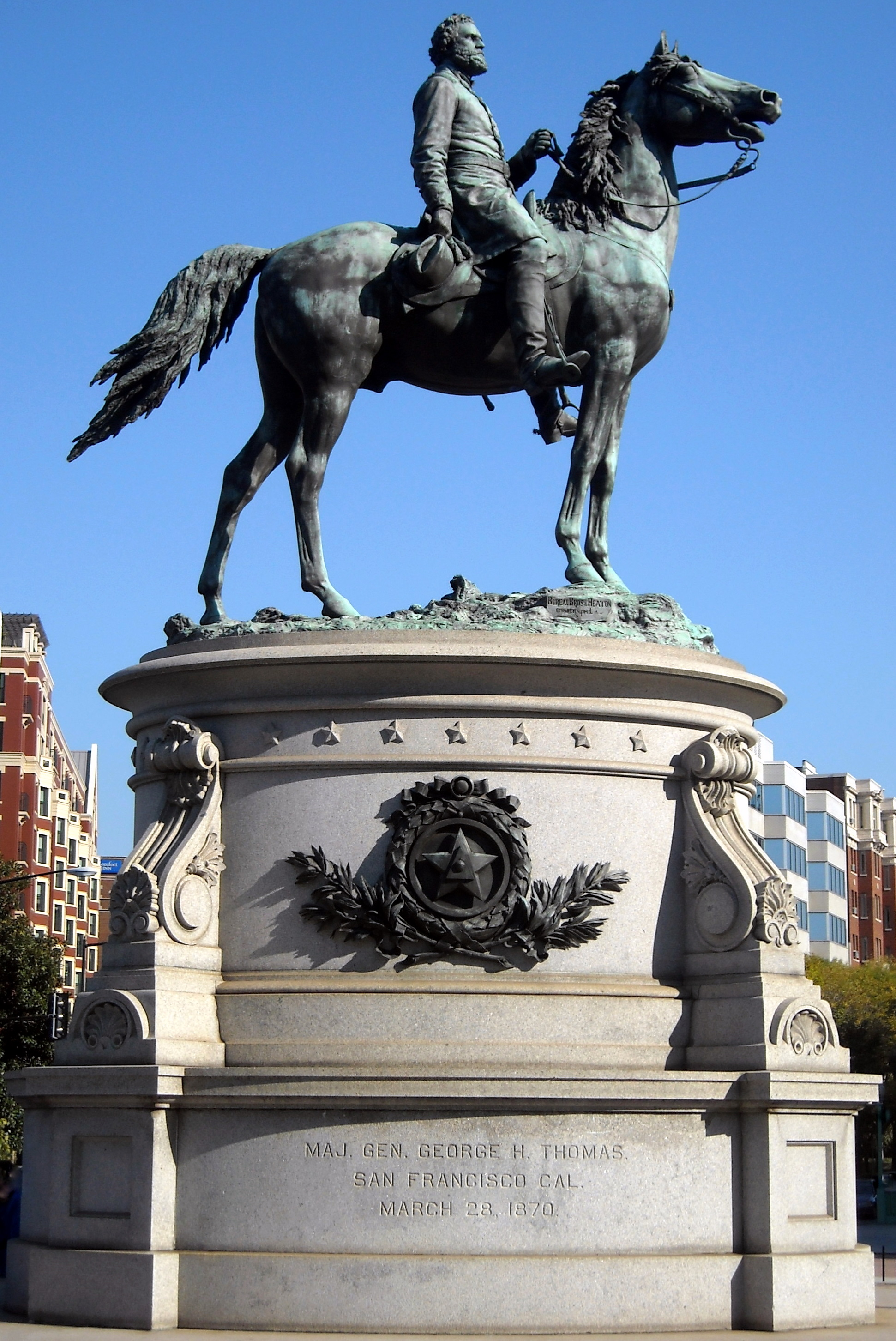
- Interactive map of Major General George Henry Thomas
- Location: Thomas Circle, Washington, D.C., United States
- Coordinates: 38°54′20.4″N 77°01′55.0″W
- Equestrian statue of George Henry Thomas
- U.S. National Register of Historic Places
- U.S. Historic district – Contributing property
- Part of: Civil War Monuments in Washington, D.C.
- NRHP reference No.: 78000257
- Added to NRHP: September 20, 1978
- Designer: John Quincy Adams Ward (sculptor); John L. Smithmeyer, Paul J. Pelz (architects)
- Material: Bronze (sculpture); Granite (base)
- Height: 16 ft (4.9 m)
- Opening date: November 19, 1879
- Dedicated to: George Henry Thomas

Major General George Henry Thomas, also known as the Thomas Circle Monument, is an equestrian sculpture in Washington, D.C., United States, that honors Civil War general George Henry Thomas. The monument is located in the center of Thomas Circle, on the border of the downtown and Logan Circle neighborhoods. It was sculpted by John Quincy Adams Ward, best known for his work on the statue of George Washington in Wall Street, Manhattan. Attendees at the dedication in 1879 included President Rutherford B. Hayes, Generals Irvin McDowell, Philip Sheridan, and William Tecumseh Sherman, senators and thousands of soldiers.

The sculpture is one of eighteen Civil War monuments in Washington, D.C., which were collectively listed on the National Register of Historic Places in 1978. It is considered by art critics and historians to be one of the best equestrian statues in the city. The statue, which rests on an oval pedestal, and the surrounding park are owned and maintained by the National Park Service, a federal agency of the Interior Department.

== History ==
=== Background ===
George Henry Thomas, a Virginian, was a Union general in the Civil War and a principal commander in the Western Theater. During the Battle of Chickamauga, he was responsible for saving the Union Army from being completely routed, earning him the nickname "Rock of Chickamauga". The Society of the Army of the Cumberland, composed of veterans, chose to erect a monument to Thomas utilizing bronze cannons captured from Confederate forces. John Quincy Adams Ward was selected to sculpt the statue and began the process in 1875. The sculpture, which cost $40,000, was paid for by the Society. On July 31, 1876, Congress appropriated $25,000 to pay for the pedestal and base, although the final cost was only $20,000. The contract for the statue stated three of the horse's feet had to be touching the ground. This was to make sure it wouldn't receive the same type of criticism Andrew Jackson's sculpture in Lafayette Square received and to avoid the "stagey, theatrical animal that poses and postures in so many of the public squares of the United States." Thomas's widow, Frances, gave Ward photographs of her husband and lent him Thomas' uniform and saddle to help with the design. After he finished the plaster model in 1879, Ward invited Thomas' family, Society officers, and members of the press to his studio in New York to view the model. The reaction was very positive. The Society was so impressed with Ward's work, they later selected him to design the James A. Garfield Monument and the Equestrian statue of Philip Sheridan as well, though the contract for the latter was eventually cancelled. Architects John L. Smithmeyer and Paul J. Pelz, best known for designing the Thomas Jefferson Building and Healy Hall, were selected to design the monument base. The Bureau Brothers Foundry cast the sculpture while stonework was provided by contractor M. K. Chase. The traffic circle where the monument was erected was previously known as Memorial Circle because nearby residents planted memorial trees in honor of their respective home states. The name was changed to Thomas Circle when the monument was installed.

=== Dedication ===
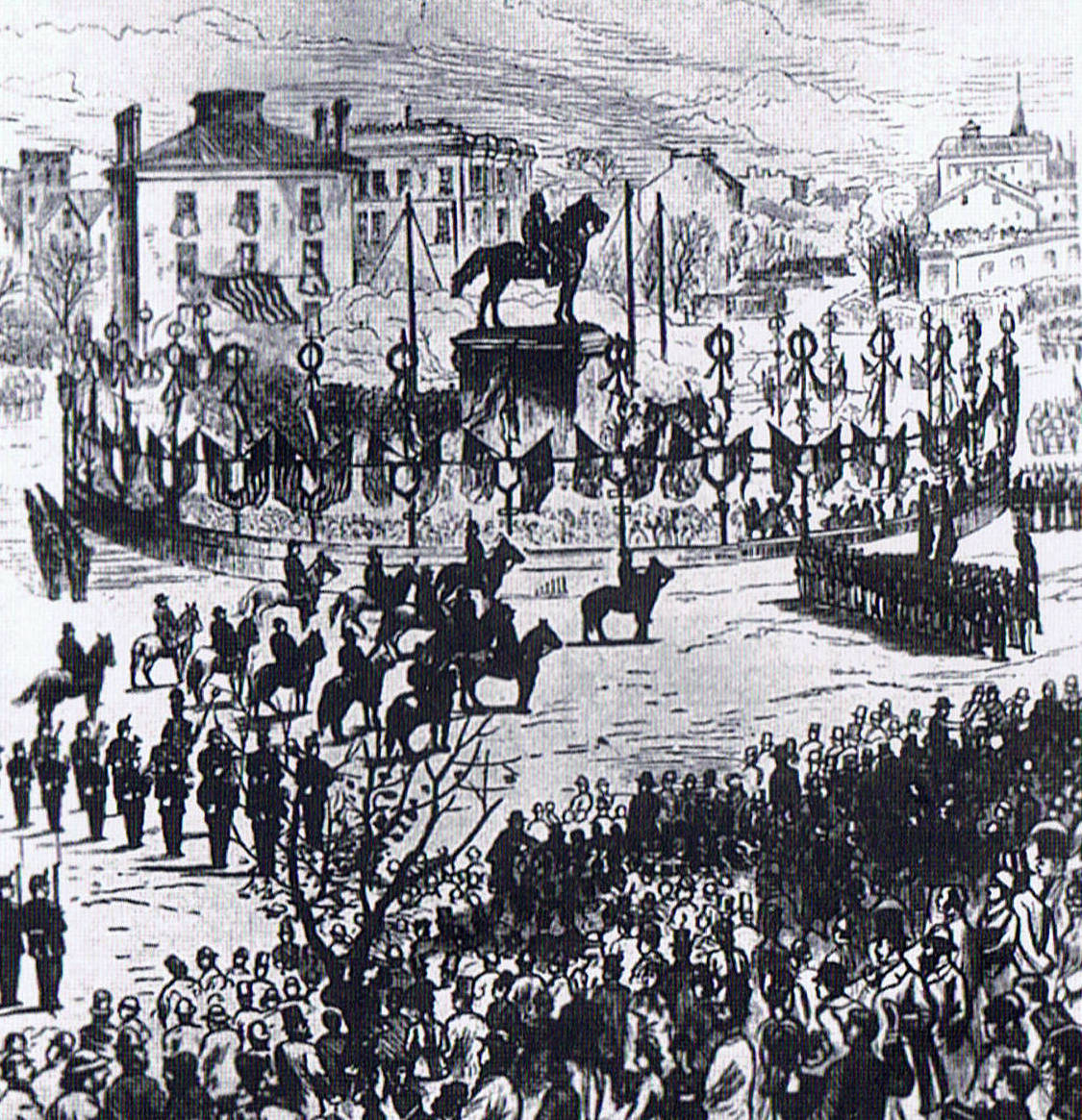
Drawing of the statue's dedication

The memorial was dedicated on November 19, 1879, with an estimated 50,000 people in attendance. Harper's Weekly described the event as the grandest ceremony ever held in the city The ceremony featured a two-mile 2 mi (3.2 km) military procession, led by General Thomas Turpin Crittenden, of around 500 Army of the Cumberland veterans, 1,000 army troops, 1,000 marines and sailors, state troops from Maryland, New York, and Pennsylvania, and generals Irvin McDowell, Philip Sheridan, and William Tecumseh Sherman. Music in the procession was performed by seven military bands, with the United States Marine Band in the first position. The procession began east of the U.S. Capitol and marched past President Rutherford B. Hayes at the White House on its way toward the memorial site. Most of the buildings along the line of march, including nearly every building on Pennsylvania Avenue, were decorated with flags, streamers, and other decorations. The most elaborately decorated building along the line of march was the Quartermaster General's office, located on the corner of 15th Street and Pennsylvania Avenue NW, which was decorated with numerous flags and a canvas bearing a portrait of Thomas. The circle and the homes surrounding it were extensively decorated. There were 38 poles, each 33 ft (10 m) high, placed around the edge of the circle, with the flag of every U.S. state at the time. A temporary platform seating 1,500 people was erected around part of the circle for special guests and dignitaries.

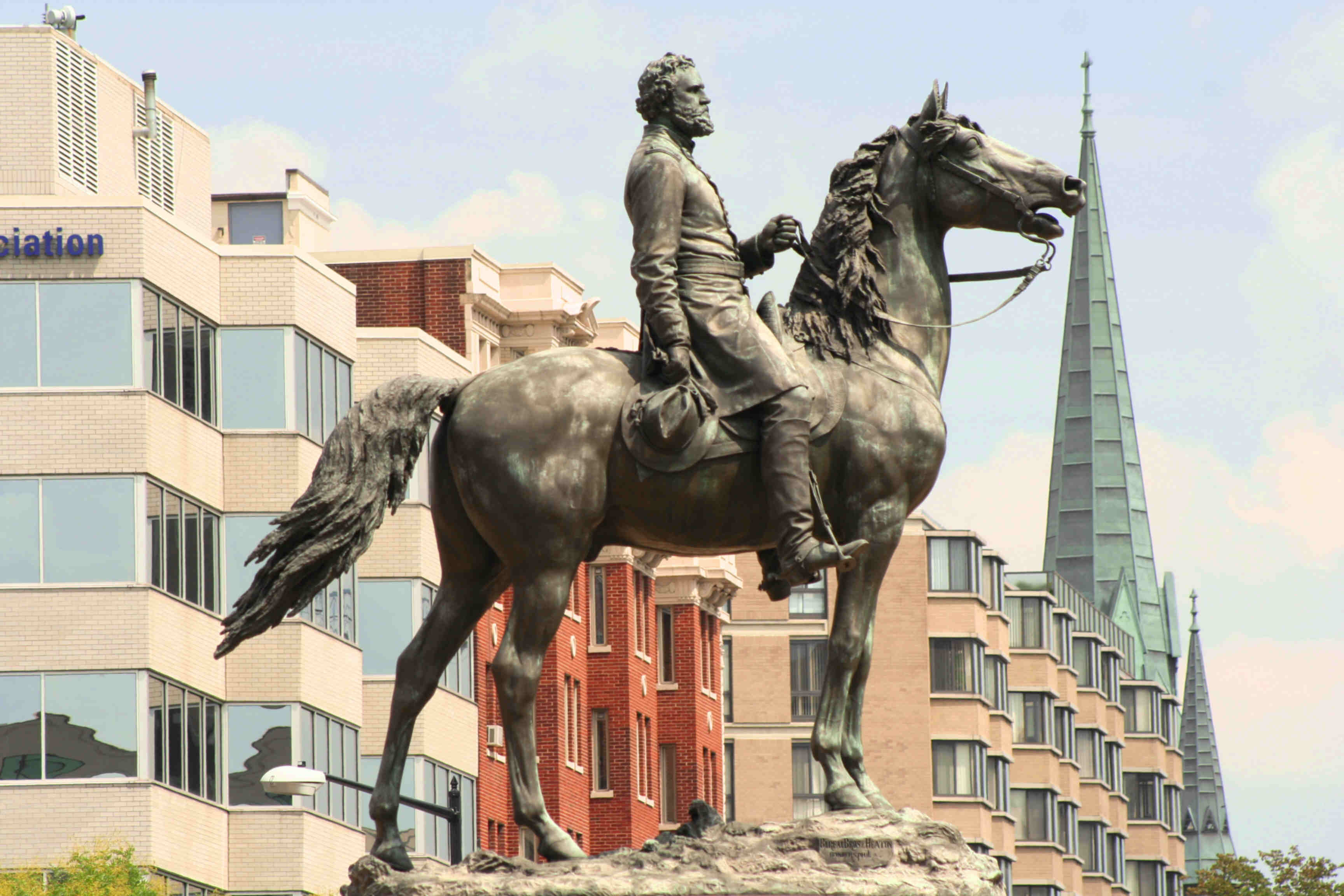

The ceremony began with a prayer followed by the songs "Hail to the Chief" and "The Star-Spangled Banner". The statue was then unveiled accompanied by a thirteen gun salute. After the unveiling, a chorus of 100 men sang hymns with music performed by the Marine Band. General Anson G. McCook, a member of the Fighting McCooks who served under Thomas, delivered the dedication speech. Senator Stanley Matthews also gave a speech which included the presentation of the statue as an offering to the country. The statue was accepted by President Hayes on behalf of the American people. Hayes stated: "In the name of the people of the United States I accept this noble statue, so worthy of its subject, erected in honor of Gen. George H. Thomas by his comrades of the illustrious Army of the Cumberland." The monument was the sixth equestrian sculpture erected in Washington, D.C.

=== Influence and historic designation ===
Art critics, historians, and Civil War monument researchers Kirk Savage and Kathryn Allamong Jacob consider the Thomas monument one of the best equestrian statues in Washington, D.C. According to Savage, it "enhanced the circle's prestige by giving it a commemorative identity in this rapidly emerging landscape" and "served at once as a national monument honoring a war hero and a real estate amenity for an affluent urban setting." It increased development at Thomas Circle and the surrounding area, although none of the stately homes around the circle are still standing. Along with seventeen other Civil War monuments, Major General George Henry Thomas was added to the National Register of Historic Places on September 20, 1978, and the District of Columbia Inventory of Historic Sites on March 3, 1979. The sculpture and the surrounding park are owned and maintained by the National Park Service, a federal agency of the Interior Department.

== Design and location ==
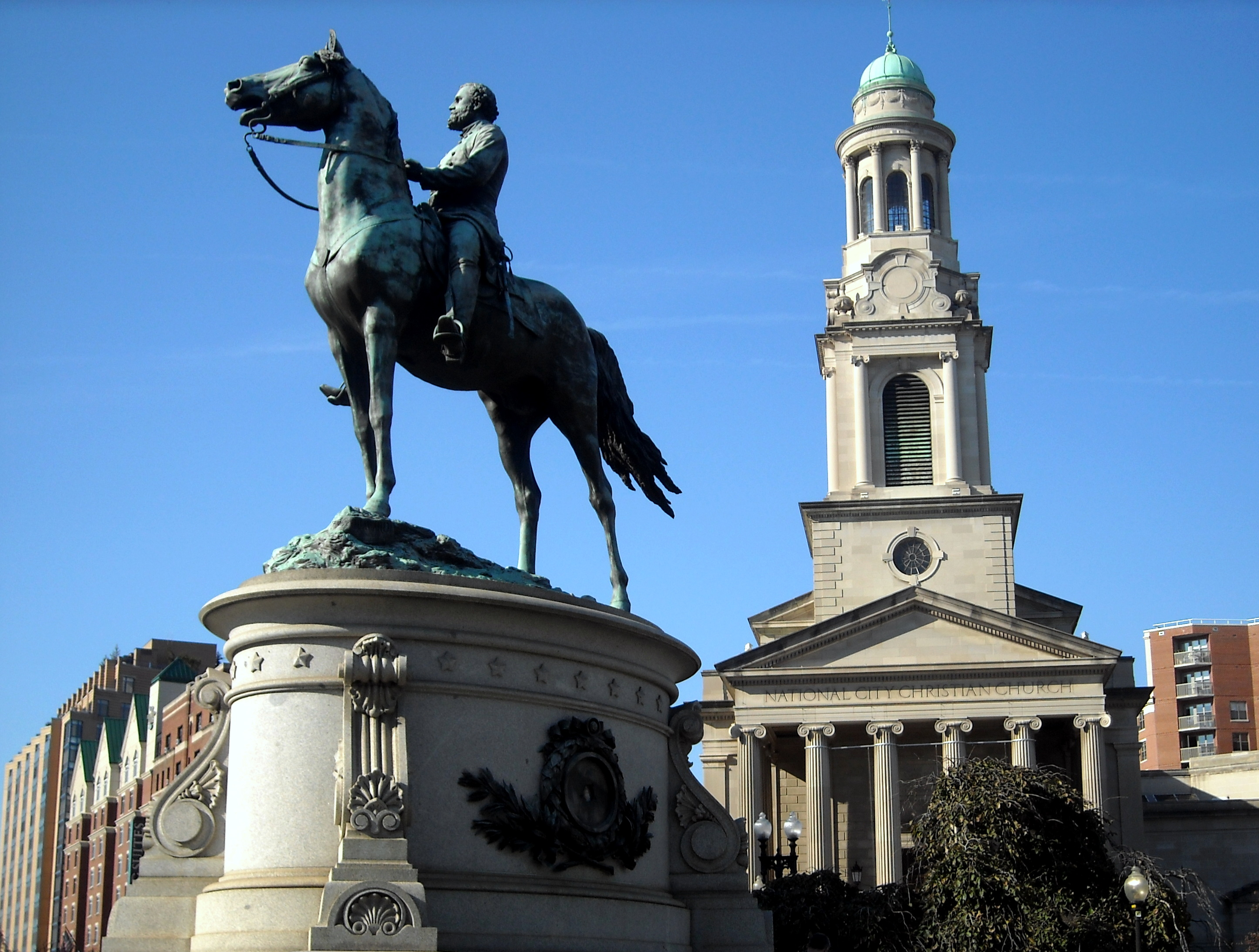
The Thomas statue with the National City Christian Church in the background

The monument is located in the center of Thomas Circle, at the intersection of 14th Street, M Street, Massachusetts Avenue and Vermont Avenue NW. Following a reconstruction of Thomas Circle completed in 2006, new sidewalks and landscaping allowed visitors easier access to the monument and surrounding park. The monument is approximately 32 ft (9.8 m) high while the statue itself is around 16 ft (4.9 m) high. The bronze figures of Thomas and the horse are around twice life-size. Thomas is depicted surveying a battlefield while at the top of a hill. He is holding the reins of the horse with his left hand and his right hand is holding his hat and gloves. Thomas is wearing a double-breasted military coat and plain riding boots, while his sword hangs from his left side. The horse looks straight ahead as its mane and tail are blown by the wind. Its "dilated nostrils, erect ears, tense muscles, and waving, bushy tail" demonstrate the horse's excitement. The horse was originally designed to be a mare. After it was pointed out that Thomas only rode stallions, additions were made to the sculpture, though the slender head and neck are still reminiscent of a mare.

The statue stands on an oval granite pedestal featuring two Baroque scrolls on each end. A bronze badge of the Army of the Cumberland, which Thomas had commanded, and a laurel wreath is also on each side of the pedestal. The circular granite base features four steps and four blocks protruding from the pedestal to the lowest step. Decorative gas lamps previously stood on the base's four blocks, but these were removed sometime around 1922.

Inscriptions on the monument include the following:

- (pedestal east side) ERECTED BY HIS COMRADES / OF THE SOCIETY OF / THE ARMY OF THE CUMBERLAND
- (pedestal, west side) MAJ. GEN. GEORGE H. THOMAS / SAN FRANCISCO CAL. / MARCH 28, 1870
- (bottom of sculpture, east side) J. Q. A. WARD SCULP 1879
- (bottom of sculpture, west side) BUREAU BROS & HEATON / FOUNDERS. PHIL

== See also ==
- List of equestrian statues in the United States
- List of public art in Washington, D.C., Ward 2
- Outdoor sculpture in Washington, D.C.
