= Wylie Mansion =

The Wylie Mansion
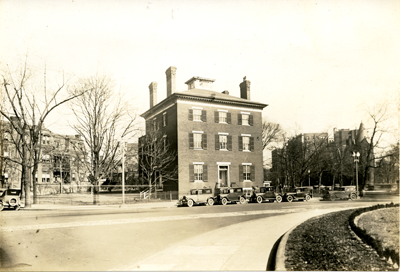
- The Wylie Mansion in 1926
- Interactive map of the The Wylie Mansion area

General information
- Status: Destroyed
- Type: Mansion
- Location: 10 Thomas Circle, Washington, D.C., United States
- Coordinates: 38°54′22″N 77°1′51″W
- Construction started: circa 1843
- Destroyed: April 20, 1947

The Wylie Mansion was an American mansion which once stood at 10 Thomas Circle in Washington, D.C.

Believed to have been built in 1843, it stood on the northeast section of the circle for over 100 years until a fire destroyed a significant portion of the house on April 20, 1947, and it was demolished.

== History ==
The mansion was built for Charles L. Coltman, a brick-maker and builder. It became known as the Wylie Mansion, however, when judge Andrew Wylie occupied it while presiding over the trial surrounding the assassination of Abraham Lincoln in 1865.

The International Inn Hotel was built there in 1962 on a design by architect Morris Lapidus. It still stands on the site following several renovations and alterations, as the Washington Plaza Hotel.

== See also ==
- 1843 in architecture
- 1947 in architecture
- List of American houses
- List of historic houses
