= National City Christian Church =

Coordinates: 38.905989°N 77.032045°W

- U.S. Historic district – Contributing property
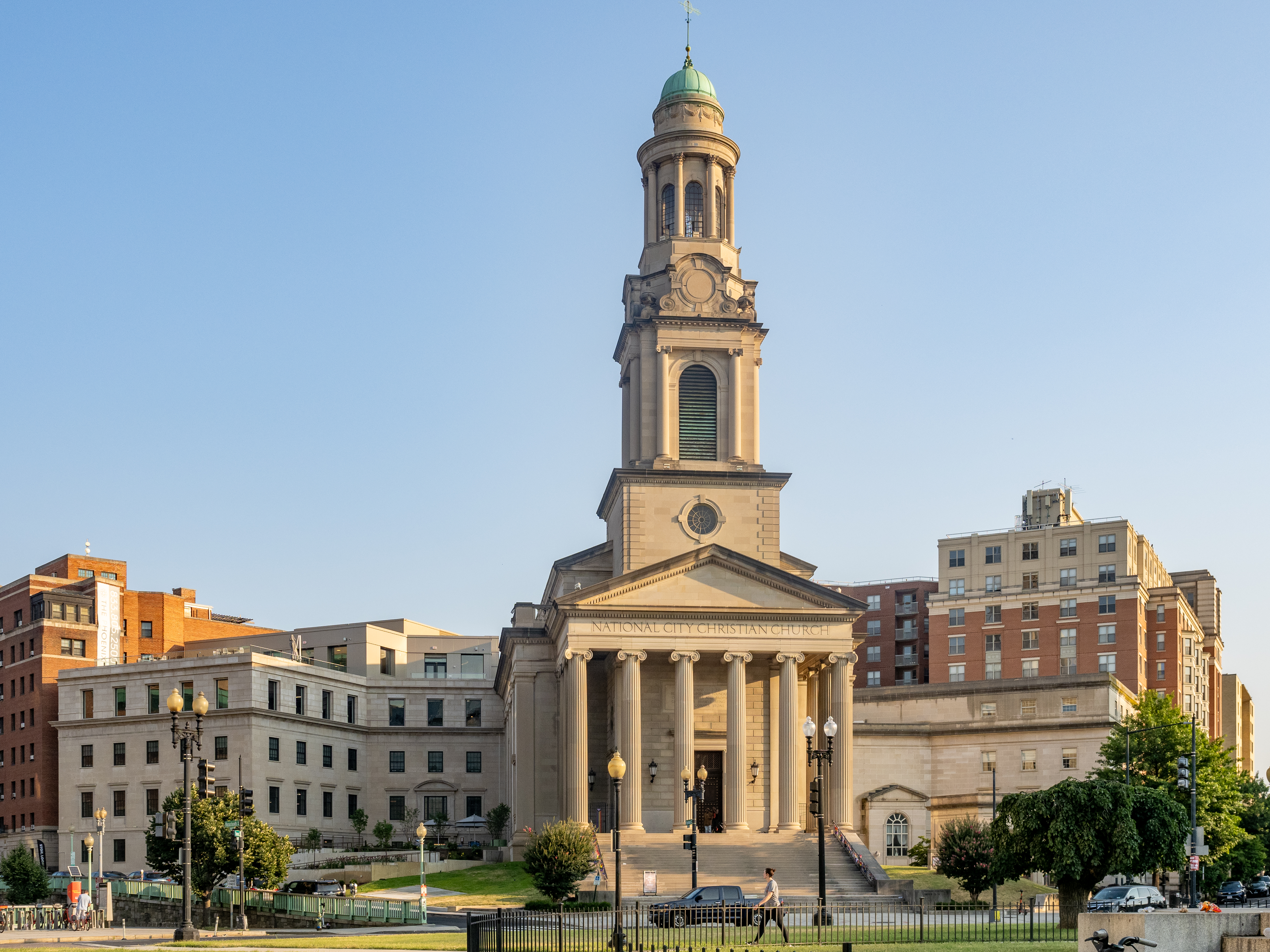
- (2024)
- Location: 5 Thomas Circle, NW; Washington, D.C.
- Area: Greater Fourteenth Street Historic District
- Built: 1930
- Architect: John Russell Pope
- Architectural style: Neoclassical
- Part of: Greater Fourteenth Street Historic District (ID94000992)
- Added to NRHP: November 9, 1994

National City Christian Church, located on Thomas Circle in Washington, D.C., is the national church and cathedral of the Christian Church (Disciples of Christ). The denomination grew from the Stone-Campbell Movement founded by Thomas Campbell and Alexander Campbell of Pennsylvania and West Virginia (then Virginia) and Barton W. Stone of Kentucky. National City Christian Church is currently led by The Rev. Stephanie Kendell, the church's first woman called to be their Senior Minister and President.

== History ==
The congregation that eventually became the National City Christian Church was organized in 1843. James Turner Barclay (1807-1874), a physician and pioneering Stone-Campbell Movement missionary, helped to organize the congregation. Prior to the erection of this building the congregation was known as Vermont Avenue Christian Church, previous building is now the home of Mt. Olivet Lutheran Church.

In the 1950s and 1960s, the church had a congregation of some 800 regular Sunday worshipers. Attendance declined over time, however; in 2011, Sunday attendance was about 125, with mostly older congregants.

Over the years, National City has housed and supported numerous justice seeking ministries most notably the Poor People's Campaign: A National Call for a Moral Revival.

In 2023, the church called their first female senior pastor and president, The Rev. Stephanie Kendell. Pastor Stephanie, who previously served as the first Executive Minister at Park Avenue Christian Church and who served as the First-Vice Moderator of the Christian Church (Disciples of Christ) from 2019 to 2023, is a preacher, podcaster, and published author.

== Architecture and surroundings ==
The large neoclassical church building was designed by John Russell Pope and completed in 1930. The structure has a "monumental character" typical of Pope's style and seen in his other works, such as the Jefferson Memorial. The church's design was partly influenced by James Gibbs' St Martin-in-the-Fields church, built at Trafalgar Square, London, in the early 18th century. The building is built of Indiana limestone. Scholar Thomas A. Tweed writes that the building's facade, "high on a terrace overlooking Thomas Circle, a prominent location in the city ... demands the attention of motorists and pedestrians."

The church "features stained glass windows commemorating the two presidents associated with the denomination, James Garfield and Lyndon Johnson."

The church is a contributing property to the Greater Fourteenth Street Historic District.

Across the street from the National City Christian Church is the Luther Place Memorial Church, which is also a historic church. Luther Place Memorial Church's neo-Gothic style sharply contrasts with the Neoclassical style of National City Christian Church. Other historic churches nearby include the Universalist National Memorial Church.

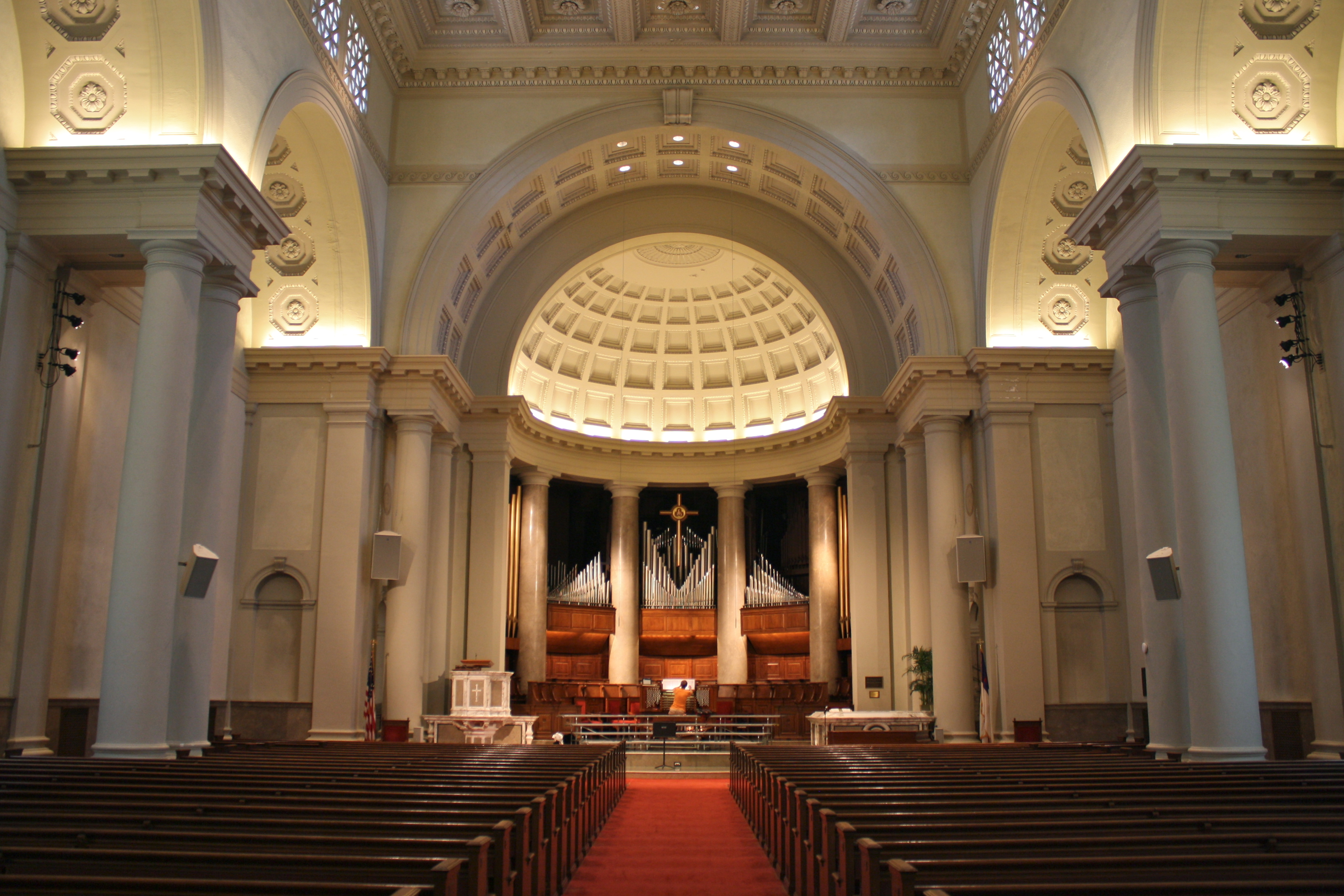

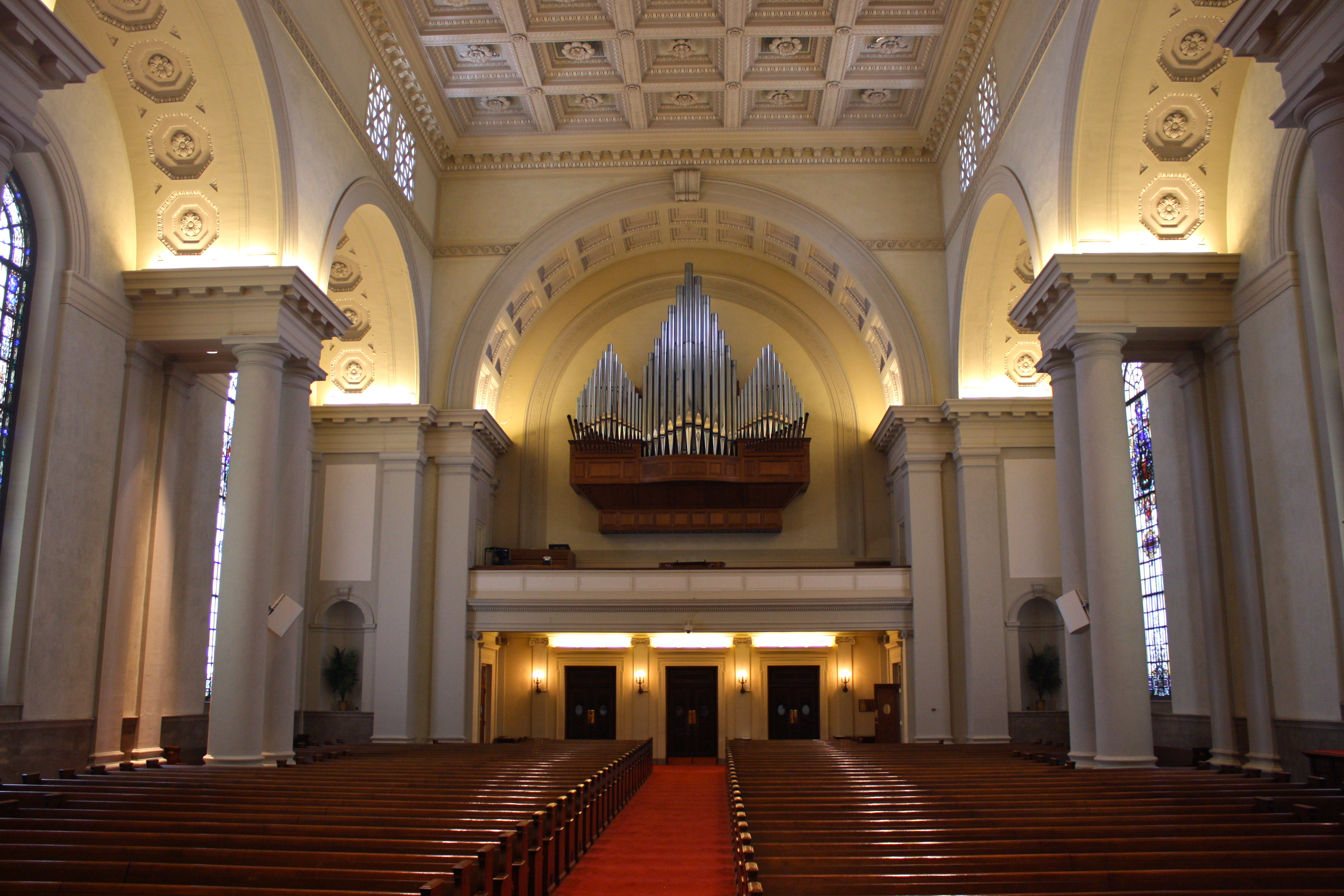

== Notable Members ==
Lyndon Baines Johnson, the 36th president of the United States, occasionally attended National City Christian Church during his time as president. His state funeral was held here in 1973.

James Garfield, the 20th President of the United States, was a member of National City Christian Church in one of its previous buildings.

Jane L. Campbell, the first female Mayor of Cleveland. Current President and CEO of the United States Capitol Historical Society.

The Rev. Dr. Amy Butler, served as the interim senior minister from June 2020 to January 2023.

Lawrence P. "Lon" Schreiber, organist and choirmaster.

== Past Leadership Issues ==
In 2004, the church's senior pastor, the Rev. Alvin O. Jackson, resigned following a heated acrimonious dispute. The ouster of Jackson followed the resignation or firings of some two dozen church staffers, and the development of a deep intra-congregational dispute. Jackson was replaced as senior pastor by the Rev. Stephen Gentle, "a soft-spoken pastor of a Florida church."

Subsequently, the church's chief financial officer, Jason Todd Reynolds, was discovered to have embezzled $850,000 in church funds from 2003 to 2008. In 2011, Reynolds was convicted of 12 fraud-related charges. He was sentenced to eight years in prison. The losses from Reynolds' embezzlement scheme caused serious damage to the church's financial health.

The 2011 Virginia earthquake caused structural damage to the church building, causing financial troubles for the church.

== See also ==
- National Register of Historic Places listings in the District of Columbia
