= John Steinbruck =

American Lutheran minister (1930–2015)

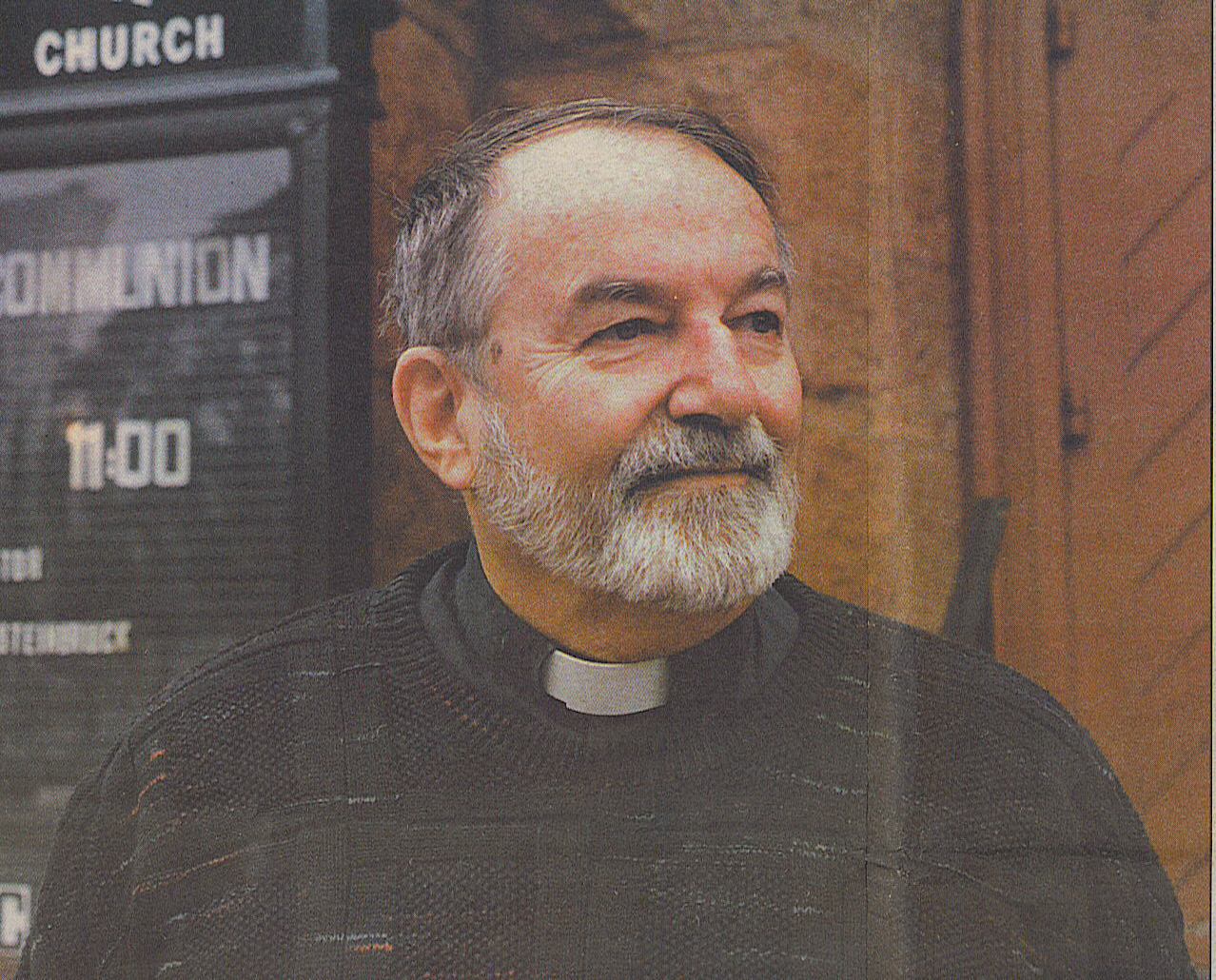
- Born: October 5, 1930; Philadelphia, Pennsylvania, U.S.
- Died: March 1, 2015 (aged 84)
- Occupation: Minister
- Spouse: Erna Guenther

John Frederick Steinbruck (October 5, 1930 – March 1, 2015) was an ordained Lutheran minister who served for 28 years (1970–1997) as senior pastor at Luther Place Memorial Church in Washington, D.C. Luther Place is a historic, red-stone church located at Thomas Circle, 1226 Vermont Avenue, N.W., in the heart of Washington's red-light district. The church sits less than a mile from the White House.

Steinbruck received many honors and much media recognition, and he was occasionally the instigator of controversy and acts of civil disobedience. To admirers, he was a "prophetic visionary" out to remake the world; to detractors, he was an "unbending, self-righteous true believer with a Messiah complex."

== Early life and family ==
The son of working-class German immigrants, Steinbruck was born and raised in Philadelphia, Pennsylvania. He suffered many health ailments as a child, including rickets, food allergies, a weak left eye and a hernia that required him to wear an iron truss, and his German heritage in the 1930s and 1940s subjected him to the very forms of prejudice he would later oppose in his Christian ministries. While growing up in Northeast Philadelphia, he attended Lawndale Elementary School, Wilson Junior High School, and Frankford High School, from which he graduated in 1948. An exceedingly thin child, at a young age he could not participate in competitive sports, though he would develop into a large, husky man with a football player's build. Steinbruck excelled at reading and developed into a good student, which would eventually lead him to college and post-graduate education. Following a two-year stint in the United States Navy, in 1949 and 1950, Steinbruck was accepted into the University of Pennsylvania, where he studied at the Wharton School of Finance. He graduated from Penn in 1954 with a Bachelor of Science degree in industrial engineering.

== Early theological influences ==
By the summer of 1953, as a 22-year-old Penn student at the Wharton School of Finance, Steinbruck realized he did not fit into this "seminary for capitalists", as he would later call it. He was a man without direction, no sense of purpose, and casual faith. A bit of a hell-raiser, he frequented seedy bars and hustled money throwing darts. One afternoon, feeling down and out, having just ended an ill-fated romance, he walked into a corner drug store. There, among the trashy romance novels and magazines, was a single paperback copy of Out of My Life and Thought by Albert Schweitzer. The book cost him thirty-five cents. He would later say that it changed his life.

In Schweitzer, Steinbruck found an embodiment of moral virtue, a role model for a life of devoted service. Although Schweitzer enjoyed life as a philosopher, musician, and biblical scholar, he was plagued by "the thought that I must not accept this happiness as a matter of course, but must give something in return for it." That so many people in the world were "denied that happiness by their material circumstances or their health" led Schweitzer, at the age of 30, to enroll in medical school. He would eventually build and re-build a hospital in Gabon, West Africa, and devote the remainder of his life caring to the medical needs of Africa's poor.

Steinbruck's spiritual search led him as well to Martin Wiznat, a Lutheran pastor in Philadelphia with a powerful speaking voice and a magnetism that engaged people, traits that would later be attributed to Steinbruck himself. Wiznat's theological world view was unlike any Steinbruck had ever heard. Steinbruck had been raised in the literalistic religion of his German immigrant parents, in a little known sect called the Faith Tract Mission. A pietistic movement, the Faith Tract Mission was a fundamentalist brand of Christianity that was in rebellion to the more formal, established Catholic and Lutheran churches of Europe. Steinbruck found it a religion of self-denial that encouraged a detachment from the world. Through his relationship and talks with Wiznat, Steinbruck "suddenly discovered," as he told the Washington Jewish Week in 1990, "that religion and faith could be respectable and did not require believing in three impossible things before breakfast every morning."

== Seminary education ==
Wiznat saw something special in Steinbruck and remarked that God may have larger plans for him. Inspired but somewhat reluctant, Steinbruck, an industrial engineer by day, began to dabble in seminary courses by night. His continued discomfort in the world of American commerce led Steinbruck eventually to enroll full-time in the Lutheran Theological Seminary at Philadelphia. There, Steinbruck was taught by energetic young professors who had studied under the top theologians of Europe - men such as John Reumann, William Lazareth, Robert Bornemann, and Theodore Tappert, intellectual leaders in the Lutheran Church in America. Steinbruck learned critical thinking in biblical analysis from these scholars, who took seriously Schweitzer's Quest for the Historical Jesus. Steinbruck's theological studies helped him to raise important questions concerning aspects of doctrinal Christianity, with an eye toward re-defining that which was truly fundamental to the faith. It was the beginning of Steinbruck's personal quest to engage Christianity as a worldly faith tradition, one that did not shy away from the realities of life; one more interested in saving lives than saving souls. "I don't need to resort to miracles to confirm my faith," Steinbruck said in 2006. "I am to deal with the realities in the world – racism, war and peace. If 45 million people have no health care, then it is my obligation to do something about it."

Steinbruck graduated from the Lutheran Theological Seminary at Philadelphia in 1959 with a Master of Divinity degree, and he earned a Doctor of Ministry from the seminary in 1979. He wrote his doctoral thesis on the concept of biblical hospitality, on the church as a place of refuge, modeled on the biblical motif of "welcoming the stranger" and the "sacred obligation" to help others. In exercising hospitality, one person shields another from harm. As he later explained this concept, "As we are hospitable to each other, we will thrive as a country."

== Marriage ==
In June 1956, Steinbruck married Erna Guenther, a native Philadelphian with a passion for justice. Light years ahead of Steinbruck in her devotion to the church, Erna worked long hours volunteering at a Lutheran settlement house in Northeast Philadelphia, where she assisted young children and helped displaced refugees. Years later, when the Steinbrucks had put into place a consortium of shelters and clinics servicing the homeless in Washington, D.C., it was typically Erna who worked tirelessly behind the scenes preparing the food, fixing the plumbing, keeping out the rats, and making the beds. "John Steinbruck talks it, Erna does it," was a common refrain. John and Erna Steinbruck together had five children, Mark John, John Andrew, Elisabeth Ann, Michael Paul, and Mary Katherine, and remained married for 58 years. They resided in Lewes, Delaware.

== Early years as pastor ==
Following seminary, Steinbruck became an assistant pastor at St. John's Lutheran Church, in Nazareth, Pennsylvania. It was not a good fit, and he always seemed to find himself in trouble. When he downed a few beers at a local watering hole following a church softball game, he offended the teetotalers of the congregation. When he rode his motorcycle through town in his clerical collar, he challenged the congregation's image of a small-town pastor. When he refused to join the Lions and Rotary Clubs, he disrespected local custom. "After that," Steinbruck told the Washington Post in a magazine profile in 1985, "I thought it was healthier to move on."

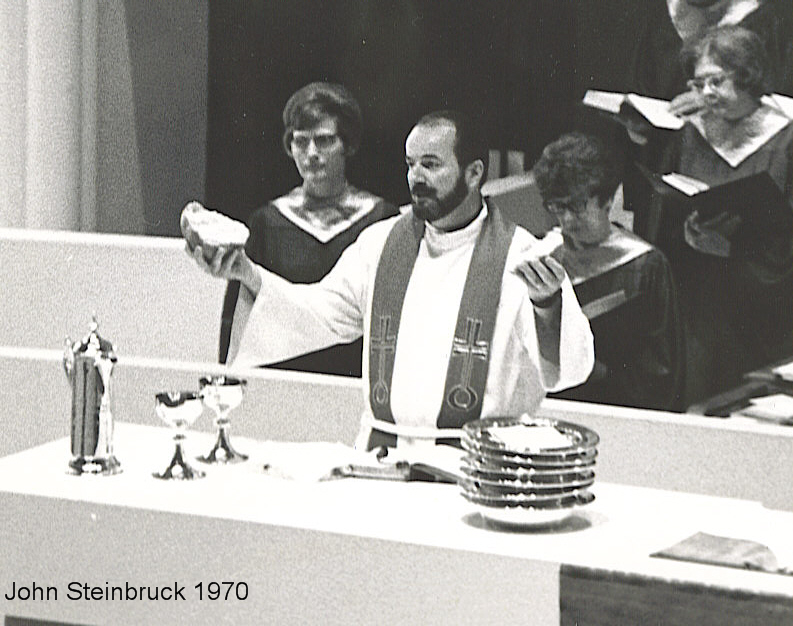
Rev. John Steinbruck at Altar circa 1970

Steinbruck thereafter sought city churches, which he believed were great arenas from which to practice his brand of theology, and which offered many opportunities for creative ministry. He found that urban churches reflected the suffering and afflictions of their surroundings - poverty, crime, decaying neighborhoods. It was in the city that Steinbruck found his true calling, confronting the effects of racism, discrimination, homelessness, economic inequality, and the injustices of American society.

Steinbruck served for ten years at St. John's Lutheran Church in Easton, Pennsylvania, a depressed industrial town with a melting pot of cultures and ethnicity. It was the early 1960s and the civil rights movement was in its infant stages. As some of his congregants were working-class blacks, Steinbruck became sensitized to issues that most suburban pastors avoided - racially discriminatory practices in every aspect of the community - that required action more than prayer. Steinbruck was the first white minister to receive the Pastor of the Year Award from the NAACP, and St. John's was the first church to take a life membership in the NAACP.

In 1968, Steinbruck befriended two Easton clergymen, Rabbi Norton Shargel of B'nai Abraham Synagogue, and a liberal Roman Catholic priest, Monsignor Francis Connolly of St. Bernard's Church's Catholic Church. In an attempt to confront the racial and other injustices in American society at that time, the three men formed an interfaith coalition, which they dubbed "ProJeCt of Easton", an acronym for Protestant, Jewish, Catholic. ProJeCt of Easton quickly caught on with the congregants of each religion, and they began working together to find solutions to the problems threatening a community that was tired of divisiveness among people of faith and favored a more positive approach to solving problems. The business community and local media embraced it and, not long thereafter, ProJeCt of Easton had established a youth center, an infant wellness program, a free dental clinic, and summer programs for disadvantaged kids that took them to community parks and beaches. More than four decades later, ProJeCt continues to provide community services in Pennsylvania's Lehigh Valley.

== Alliance with Jewish community ==
Through his friendship with Rabbi Shargel, Steinbruck became closely associated with the Jewish community, an association that would profoundly affect his ministry for the rest of his life. Rabbi Shargel taught Steinbruck that "as one works, struggles, with those who are strangers, we learn what pains them." Steinbruck accompanied Rabbi Shargel, Father Connolly, and 25 laypersons on an interfaith trip to Israel in 1969. The Six-Day War a recent memory, Steinbruck experienced first hand the positive exuberance of the Jewish homeland, its Zionist ideals of community, security, and cooperation. He also experienced its sorrow and pain. He visited Yad Vashem and the memorial to the Warsaw Ghetto. He learned of thousands of years of Jewish struggle and survival, and the history of anti-Semitism that has so often tainted the Christian Church. He visited the Western Wall, walked the streets of historic Jerusalem, touched the waters of Jordan and Galilee, and experienced the celebration of life - and constant fear of attack - that embraces Israel's daily routine.

In the 1970s and 1980s, before the fall of the Soviet Union, when Steinbruck was pastor of Luther Place Church, he would often join groups of rabbis and others in protesting the plight of Soviet Jews. Steinbruck became a regular at the Soviet Jewry Vigil, where groups of protesters stood across the street from the Soviet embassy in Washington, D.C. With his Luther Place congregants, Steinbruck stood-in for Jewish protesters on Rosh Hashanah and Yom Kippur. On one occasion in 1985, Steinbruck was arrested with 21 rabbis protesting the plight of Soviet Jews in front of the Soviet embassy. On another occasion, in September 1985, during the Jewish High Holidays, Steinbruck and three others, including a Catholic priest, were arrested for holding signs with anti-Soviet slogans across the street from the embassy. On January 31, 1986, the four protesters were sentenced in District of Columbia Superior Court to 15-day suspended jail terms. Steinbruck said afterwards that he hoped his actions could be a "model for Jewish-Christian relations" and that "what happens to one of us happens to us all."

Steinbruck's understanding of the historical connectnedness of Judaism and Christianity, and the origins of Christian anti-Semitism made him a positive ecumenical voice among people of differing faiths. He regularly reminded his own parishioners of what he called the "Jewishness of Christianity", the notion that "Jesus was born a Jew, lived the life of a Jew, and died a Jew." He was deeply influenced by the writings of Krister Stendahl, a former dean of the Harvard Divinity School, who authored a seminal work on the Apostle Paul, which argued that the Covenant of Sinai remained at once valid and viable, and that Christianity was historically and theologically wrong in attempting to fulfill an evangelistic "mission" to the Jewish people. Steinbruck found this work liberating, believing that the history of proselytizing among the Jews was responsible for much of their brutalization and suffering, including the Inquisition and centuries of persecution, culminating in the pogroms of Eastern Europe and the Holocaust.

In May 1977, Steinbruck was asked to respond to a statement made by President Jimmy Carter during a Sunday School lesson he taught at the First Baptist Church on 16th Street in Washington, D.C. Carter was asked a question concerning the responsibility for the crucifixion of Christ, to which Carter responded that the Jews were responsible for the death of Jesus. It was arranged for Steinbruck to write a letter addressed to President Carter's personal lawyer, in which Steinbruck explained the Southern Baptist Convention's historical stand on the subject and its official repudiation of Deicide. In response, Carter apologized for his misstatement and, in a letter hand-delivered to Steinbruck, acknowledged that Jews "were for many centuries falsely charged with the collective responsibility for the death of Jesus and were persecuted terribly for that unjust accusation, which has been exploited as a basis and rationalization for anti-Semitism."

On September 21, 1978, Steinbruck received the Isaiah Award for the Pursuit of Justice from the Washington, D.C., chapter of the American Jewish Committee in recognition of his pursuit of inter-religious dialogue and understanding. In April 1980, the Jewish Community Council of Washington, D.C., asked Steinbruck and the Rev. Eugene Brake, a Roman Catholic Priest, to accompany them to the Soviet Union to visit with a group of refuseniks, Soviet citizens, mostly Jewish, who were denied permission to emigrate from the Soviet Union. Upon their arrival in Moscow, Steinbruck, Brake, and two women members of the delegation were detained by Soviet officials and questioned for hours about the purpose of their trip. Documents containing the names and addresses of the refuseniks they planned to visit were confiscated from them. Only after the intervention of the U.S. Embassy and inquiries from American media sources, were Steinbruck and the others finally released.

== Later theological influences ==
Steinbruck discovered the meaning of kiddush haShem, to sanctify God's name and to pursue justice at all costs, from the teachings of Seymour Siegel, a professor at the Jewish Theological Seminary of America. This concept, together with the writings of other great theologians - Dietrich Bonhoeffer and Rabbi Abraham Joshua Heschel among them - helped Steinbruck develop a central message, which eventually would define much of his life's work. As he told the Washington Post in a 1985 interview:

We are on this planet to exemplify that light, that bread, that living water, those metaphors that Jesus used, to live out the truth in a non-violent way, simply to do justice, live justly, try, in the space over which you're responsible . . . to create an oasis . . . to which the stranger can come and find refuge.

Steinbruck also found meaningful the writings and teachings of Henri Nouwen, the Dutch-born Catholic priest who authored many famous and well-read books on spirituality, hospitality, and the belovedness of God. Steinbruck's favorite of Nouwen's works was Reaching Out: The Three Movements of the Spiritual Life (Doubleday 1986), in which Nouwen discusses the spiritual dimensions of solitude, hospitality, and prayer.

== Luther Place and the N Street Village ==
Steinbruck would put into place the concepts of biblical hospitality and welcoming the stranger at Luther Place Memorial Church in Washington, D.C., where he became senior pastor in 1970. Founded in 1873, Luther Place is an historic, moderately sized, red-stone church with a steeple located on Thomas Circle in the heart of Washington. Just five blocks from the White House – "King's Palace" as he used to call it – the church straddled an invisible border at 14th and N Streets between the halls of power, including embassies, fancy restaurants, and posh hotels, and the city's red light district, encompassing some of the nation's worst urban blight.

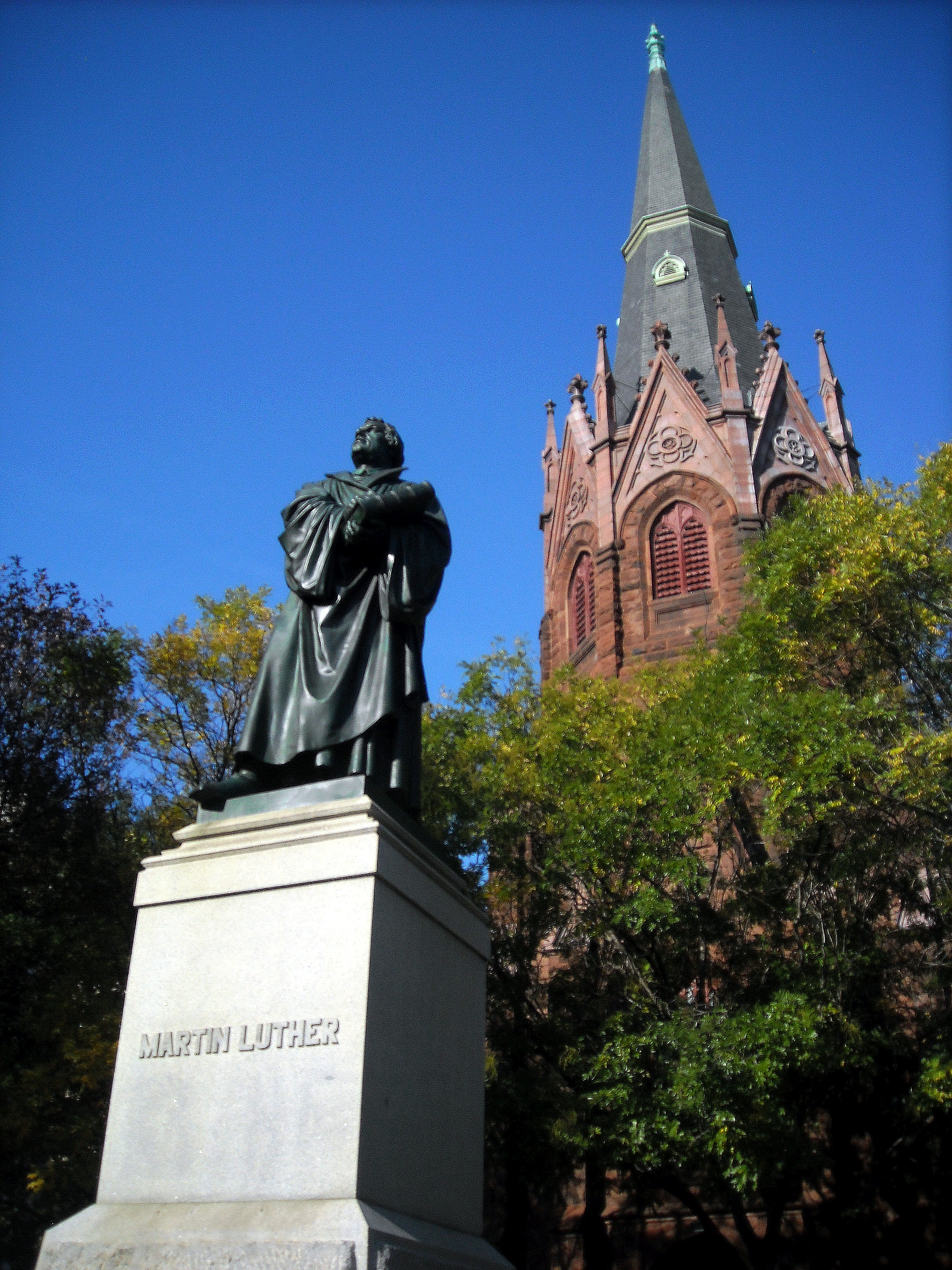
Luther Place Memorial Church in Washington, D.C.

When Steinbruck arrived at Luther Place, he found a congregation beset with many of the problems confronting most big-city churches. The civil uprisings that followed the assassination of Martin Luther King Jr., had left scars on Washington's neighborhoods and businesses. Prostitutes and pimps, drug dealers and dope fiends loitered and lingered on the street corners. Steinbruck confronted a dying church with no sense of purpose. They owned 21,000 square feet (2,000 m^{2}) of land, including five buildings, yet had visions only of building a parking lot. For Steinbruck, this was disgraceful. That Luther Place had so much space that was used only at eleven o'clock on Sunday morning was a violation of everything he believed and preached.

The church was renting out most of its properties on N Street, two of which were being used as houses of prostitution. One night, Steinbruck received a call at 3:00 a.m. because a pimp had thrown a young prostitute out of a third-story window. Traumatized, the congregation voted to tear down the row houses. Steinbruck thought otherwise, and under his leadership and guiding hand, a new way of thinking emerged. "All of a sudden," he told the Washington Post in 1985, "it occurred to us that the way to go was not to close up but to open up. We felt that if our space and our facilities could be used in demonic and anti-human ways, they could also be used in inspirational ways." Luther Place thus became an open place of refuge for the "least of these" - the wandering, nomadic homeless of the nation's capital.

== Responding to homelessness ==
By the early 1970s, homelessness had become a huge problem in Washington, with growing numbers of mental patients released into the streets, a consequence of the de-institutionalization of mental hospitals. In response, a coalition was formed between the Community for Creative Non-Violence (founded by J. Edward Guinan and then home of the radical homeless advocate Mitch Snyder), the Sojourners Community (led by the Rev. Jim Wallis), and Luther Place (led by Steinbruck) to provide shelter for those in need. Luther Place, as the host church, provided the space. "You don't need five years of seminary to realize that, when someone knocks on the door, you should open it," Steinbruck would later say. Inspired by Matthew 25 ("I was hungry and you fed me, thirsty and you gave me drink; I was a stranger and you welcomed me"), Luther Place established an emergency shelter, first with blankets, later mattresses, sprawled on the floor of the church sanctuary. Ten bodies, then thirty, then fifty, filled the sanctuary.

Not long thereafter, Steinbruck recalled, "We made an amazing discovery – homeless people need to eat!" So Luther Place developed a food plan and prepared meals. As many of the homeless were drug and alcohol addicted, they opened a drug counseling and treatment center. As many were suffering from mental illness, with medical needs long neglected, they developed a medical clinic and provided psychiatric counseling. All of this occurred without a plan or the wherewithal to pay for it. Yet people responded. Although the CCNV eventually went its own direction, Luther Place members volunteered and a growing community of supporters eventually chipped in, including the Sojourners Community, the Catholic Worker Movement, and the Jewish community. Wesley Theological Seminary students volunteered for overnight duty. Many others provided financial and logistical support.

Conditions were primitive at first, but in time more and more volunteers appeared as the church became instantly filled wall-to-wall each night; in the words of Steinbruck, "the grapevine community network reached the forsaken." Luther Place, which had been struggling to justify its existence, now could not perish for the sake of those who needed it to live. By opening its doors and becoming a place of urban hospitality and refuge, Steinbruck believed, "those who save the homeless, will in turn be saved by the homeless."

What eventually emerged was the N Street Village, a diverse consortium of services that help the homeless regain their self-confidence, develop life skills, and prepare, step-by-step, to return to mainstream society. Steinbruck refers to it as a place of refuge, where the "stranger" is welcomed and the journey to recovery results in strength, well-being, and shalom. Today, helped by a combination of congressional and foundation grants, and thousands of individual contributors, the N Street Village is a four-story, $17.9 million complex made up of shelters and clinics that offer food, clothing, housing, medical care, and social and psychiatric services to homeless women and their children.

With committed lay leadership and the relentless behind-the-scenes work of Erna Steinbruck, Luther Place not only helped put in place the N Street Village, but also played supporting roles in such ministries as Bread for the City, the Zacchaeus Free Medical Clinic, and the D.C. Hotline, agencies that assist the homeless and advocate for those in need. "If you want to find Jesus," Steinbruck insists, "go to where the outcasts are - the sick, the homeless, the poor." With prostitutes and pimps outside the church, the mentally ill homeless inside the church, Luther Place, led by Steinbruck but supported by a strong and supportive lay leadership, created "an integrity of the Gospel that was not planned."

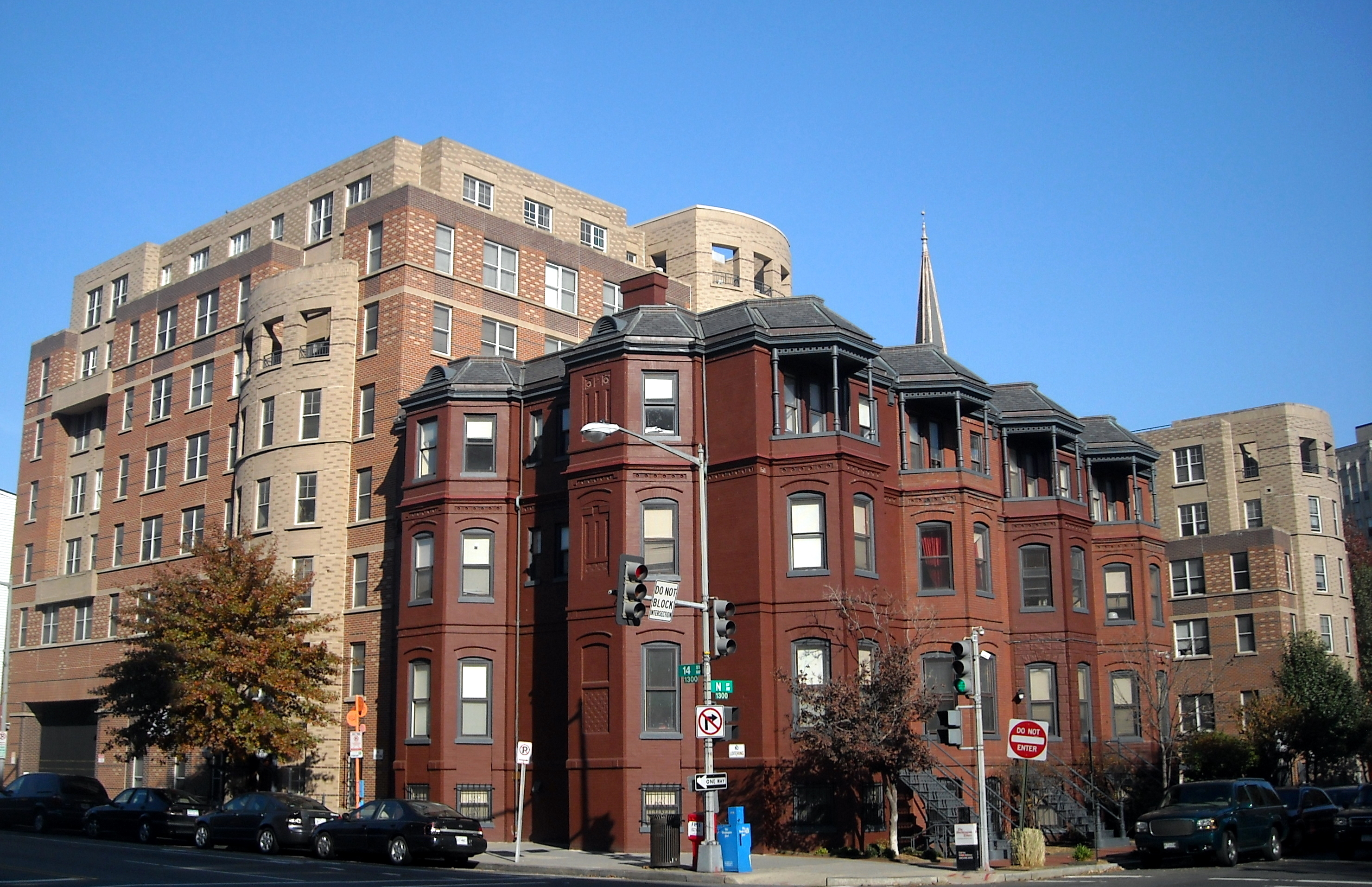
N Street Village

== Lutheran Volunteer Corps ==
In 1979, Steinbruck wanted to create something that would involve a younger generation of volunteers. He knew of other church-sponsored community service programs, such as the Jesuit Volunteer Corps, formed in the late 1950s; and the Mennonite Voluntary Service, which was founded in 1944. So he helped found the Lutheran Volunteer Corps (LVC), which became a ministry of Luther Place and operated in space provided by the church and the ministries of the N Street Village. Modeled as a very small version of the Peace Corp, volunteers work in social justice agencies—homeless shelters, medical clinics, refugee services, justice advocacy groups—for a one-year period, while living in intentional community with other volunteers in group houses. In explaining his vision for LVC, Steinbruck recalled the work of Albert Schweizer, who turned his back on a brilliant career to volunteer as a physician in the heart of Africa, learning first-hand the importance of "reverence for life." "My early memories are of the military, of dehumanization. . . . I really wish that I could have started out with the LVC rather than boot camp." Today, LVC has over 100 volunteers serving at social justice agencies in over a dozen cities throughout the country.

== Sanctuary Movement and other controversies ==
In the early 1980s, Luther Place became the first Washington area church to declare itself a sanctuary for Central American refugees. Steinbruck joined with ten other churches in Washington, D.C., to form the D.C. Sanctuary Committee, which contended that the Reagan Administration was in violation of the 1980 Refugee Act in its attempts to deport Central American refugees who sought shelter in U.S. churches. "For us the issue is not whether they [refugees from Guatemala and El Salvador] are legal or illegal, but that they be welcome . . . be safe and be protected," Steinbruck told The Washington Post in 1985. The church has "a mandate biblically that requires we share our place... We will open our doors to those who knock." When eight Sanctuary Movement workers were convicted in Tucson, Arizona, in May 1986 for sheltering Central American refugees, Steinbruck criticized the Justice Department and compared President Reagan to King Herod. Steinbruck publicly vowed, "We're simply going to keep our doors open to those who need help." Steinbruck's actions earned a public rebuke from nationally syndicated columnist Charles Krauthammer, who noted that Herod was not elected, while the laws broken by Sanctuary Movement workers were enacted by a democratically elected Congress. "As a consequence, its laws -- until repealed by state, not church -- command respect." But Steinbruck claimed that "[t]he whole idea of faith is that we have refuge, that we give refuge to each other. That's the good news, that we are all under God's tent."

The first Lutheran Bishop of El Salvador, Medardo Gomez, formed a strong partnership and alliance with Steinbruck and Luther Place. He visited Luther Place in the late 1980s and early 1990s, visits reciprocated by Steinbruck on missions to El Salvador. From the pulpit of Luther Place, Bishop Gomez called on Lutherans to work for a U.S. foreign policy based on justice, not domination; to urge the U.S. government to not send weapons to El Salvador and train its military forces, but instead to help the country's impoverished citizens by sending medical supplies, food, clothing and housing assistance. During one visit, Gomez gave Luther Place a replica of a six-foot cross that survived three bombings of Gomez's church in El Salvador.

Steinbruck's civil disobedience in the 1970s and 1980s also included acts of protest against the South African system of apartheid in front of the South African Embassy, and opposition to the U.S. military build-up. Steinbruck's most notorious arrest occurred on September 18, 1973, when he gained admission to the Air Force Association Nuclear Arms Technology Exhibition, held at a Washington Hotel. Dressed in his clerical collar and in possession of his Navy ID card, Steinbruck went from booth to booth asking, "How many people can this [weapon] kill?" Steinbruck later explained that the defense contractors in the booths "began to get very uncomfortable and they called security and I was invited to leave. I refused, so they called the cops, and they arrested me." Steinbruck was acquitted at a subsequent trial in which the Rev. Jim Ford, Chaplain of the U.S. House of Representatives, and the Rev. George Evans, Chaplain of the U.S. Marine Corps, testified as Steinbruck's character witnesses.

== Legacy ==
The success of the N Street Village in addressing the issue of homelessness in the nation's capital is only part of the life and legacy of John Steinbruck. Inspired by the words of the prophet Isaiah, "to be a light to the nations," he attracted many new members to Luther Place who discovered "a no non-sense task force of God working here at Thomas Circle - this intersection of the good, the bad, the ugly and the beautiful - they became drawn to the craziness of God." Steinbruck was arrested for numerous acts of civil disobedience, resulting in church censures and an expanding assortment of critics. He was invited to the White House during the Camp David Accords as a symbol of Christian-Jewish unity, then later rebuffed in his attempts to convince the Reagan Administration to donate White House leftovers to the homeless. As Steinbruck said on December 22, 1994, upon accepting a federal grant for the N Street Ministries from President Bill Clinton and Secretary of Housing and Urban Development Henry Cisneros, "I fantasize...the day will come when all church steeples and synagogues will be as synonymous...to welcoming the stranger, the homeless family, as the McDonald's arches are famous for hospitality to jogging presidents."

As a lasting legacy to John and Erna Steinbruck, in 2001, Luther Place created the Steinbruck Center for Urban Studies, an interfaith ministry of justice, hospitality, and learning designed to educate people on the N Street Village model and the history of Luther Place. The Steinbruck Center provides research and training opportunities for students and adults of all ages to learn how to effectively address the root causes of homelessness and urban poverty.
