= Eric Sheptock =

American advocate for the homeless (born 1969)

- Born: February 15, 1969 (age 57); Atlantic City, New Jersey, US
- Education: Hollister Christian Academy
- Occupation: Homeless advocate
- Website: Blog

Eric Jonathan Sheptock (born February 15, 1969) is an American advocate for the homeless. Sheptock is currently homeless, and often referred to as a homeless, homeless advocate.

== Early life ==
Sheptock was born in Atlantic City. He suffered a massive head injury as a child, and was not expected to develop normal cognitive functions. The head injury also left him exhausted and causing him to walk away from many conversations.

Sheptock was in foster care for about five years. Then, when he was five years old, he was adopted by Joanne and Rudy Sheptock, a Polish man and Italian woman. They lived in an old mansion in Peapack-Gladstone, New Jersey and had a family of thirty-seven children—seven natural-born and thirty adopted children. Most of the children they adopted had some sort of disability, such as: neurological impairment, mental retardation, emotional problems, blindness, missing limbs and lung problems.

In 1985, the family moved to Interlachen, Florida. Sheptock graduated from Hollister Christian Academy.

== Early homelessness ==
Sheptock was homeless off and on since 1994 after walking off his job as freight handler after a dispute with his supervisor. From 1998 until 2005, he used crack cocaine. In the Summer of 2005, Sheptock hiked from Gainesville, Florida—where he had been homeless and unemployed—to Washington, D.C. His first night in D.C.—where he stayed in Logan Circle Park—was his last night using crack cocaine.

== Fight to save Franklin Shelter ==
In 2006, around the time the future of Franklin School Shelter was in flux, Eric Sheptock received coaching on homeless advocacy from Mary Ann Luby, a Dominican Nun. Sheptock began his advocacy as a member of the committee to save Franklin Shelter. The Franklin School Shelter was a 235-bed men's shelter in downtown, DC. The Franklin Shelter served as an emergency facility—residents were permitted to stay there only between 4 P.M. and 7 A.M. In November, after the closing of Franklin Shelter, a fellow homeless advocate, David Pirtle, taught him how to use email. Sheptock and other advocate prevented the shelter from closing in 2006.

On September 26, 2008, however, Mayor Adrian Fenty closed the shelter and the residents—including Sheptock—had their personal belongings moved to a homeless shelter in Anacostia. Sheptock brought suit in D.C. Superior Court, alleging two D.C. law violations, as well as a Fifth Amendment procedural due process claim premised on the District's failure to provide advance notice and an opportunity to be heard before closing the shelter. Shortly thereafter, Sheptock brought a new suit in D.C. Superior Court that raised eight claims: "a Fifth Amendment procedural due process claim; a Takings Clause challenge to the appropriation of the former residents' personal belongings; intentional infliction of emotional distress; conversion; negligence; and violations of the Emergency Act, the Frigid Temperature Protection Amendment Act of 1988, D.C.Code § 4–753.01, and the Homeless Services Reform Act of 2005, D.C.Code § 4–754.22." In these suits, Sheptock did not prevail. Sheptock tried to sue in Federal Court, but the suit was dismissed on Res Judicata grounds.

== Homeless advocate ==
After the Franklin Shelter closed, Sheptock moved to the downtown, D.C. shelter, Community for Creative Non-Violence, which was founded by J. Edward Guinan and made famous by one of its later activists, Mitch Snyder.

By June 2009, National Public Radio's All Things Considered did a piece on him called "Homeless Advocate Goes High Tech." He appeared on CNN to make a pitch for a job. By 2010, Eric Sheptock had 4,548 Facebook friends, 839 Twitter followers, and two blogs.

Sheptock was mentioned in Barbara Ehrenreich's Nickel and Dimed, speaking to the criminalization of homelessness, saying "Can you imagine?""They arrested a homeless man in a shelter for being homeless?"

In 2011, Sheptock launched "Shelter, Housing, and Respectful Change" for the purpose of informing homeless people about budget cuts that could negatively impact their lives.

In 2013, he launched a robust conversation with activists and government about the possibility of his home, Community for Creative Non-Violence, the 1,350 bed shelter closing.

In 2014, the DC City Council declared December 31, 2014 as "Eric Jonathan Sheptock Day." In a ceremony, Jim Graham and Muriel Bowser presented Sheptock with the honor.
