= Promises to Keep =

Promises to Keep may refer to:

- Promises to Keep (film), a 1988 documentary film
- Promises to Keep (novel), a 1993 novel in the Den of Shadows series
- Promises to Keep (Biden book), a 2007 memoir by Joe Biden
