= LVC =

The three-letter acronym LVC may refer to:

- low voltage CMOS (LVCMOS), a logic family
  - 74LVC-series integrated circuits, a logic family of integrated circuits
- Lebanon Valley College
- Lee Van Cleef
- Linton Village College
- Live, Virtual, and Constructive
- Liverpool Central railway station, England; National Rail station code LVC.
- Louis Vuitton Cup
- Lutheran Volunteer Corps
- Las Vegas Club, a former casino in Las Vegas
