= Mary Ellen Hombs =

Mary Ellen Hombs was the deputy director of the U.S. Interagency Council on Homelessness, a governmental entity that is made up of the heads of various federal departments and agencies with the mission of developing a comprehensive federal approach to end homelessness. She served from 2003 to 2009.

Hombs was the primary author of Homelessness in America: A Forced March to Nowhere with Mitch Snyder. She was an important member of the Community for Creative Non-Violence, founded by J. Edward Guinan. During the 1970s and 1980s she lived there, along with Snyder, Carol Fennelly, Harold Moss, and Lin Romano. A 1981 Washington Post article featuring the efforts of Hombs, spoke of her sacrificing dreams of a career, marriage, or normal middle-class lifestyle in order to serve the Washington, D.C. homeless population seven days a week, three hundred and sixty-five days per year. Hombs stated her goal as convincing churches and the government to provide shelters enticing enough that “even the most isolated, the most hardened person could feel the desire to come out of the cold.” She assisted the CCNV by cooking meals to feed over six hundred people a day and helping run the organization's Drop-In Center.

In 1995, Mary Ellen Hombs donated her papers to the Special Collections Research Center of The George Washington University. The collection is composed of correspondence, reports, photographs, articles, flyers, and court documents, much of which is related to the work of the CCNV.

== Selected works ==
- AIDS Crisis in America: A Reference Handbook by Mary Ellen Hombs, Eric K. Lerner, Hardcover, Abc-Clio Inc, ISBN 1-57607-070-0 (1-57607-070-0) 1992
- American Homelessness: A Reference Handbook by Mary Ellen Hombs, Hardcover, Abc-Clio Inc, ISBN 1-57607-247-9 (1-57607-247-9) 1990
- Homelessness in America: A Forced March to Nowhere by Mary Ellen Hombs, Softcover, Community for Creative, ISBN 0-686-39879-3 (0-686-39879-3) 1982
- Welfare Reform: A Reference Handbook by Mary Ellen Hombs, Hardcover, Abc-Clio Inc, ISBN 0-87436-844-8 (0-87436-844-8) 1996
