= St. Joseph's High School (Denver) =

Location
- 601 Fox Street; Denver, Colorado 80204
- 39.725698°N 104.995205°W

Information
- Type: Private, coeducational
- Religious affiliation: Roman Catholic
- Established: 1908
- Closed: 1973
- Faculty: Redemptorist Priests, Sisters of Mercy, civilian teachers, coaches, and administrators
- Grades: 9–12
- Campus type: Urban
- Colors: Royal blue and white
- Fight song: The Bulldog Song
- Athletics conference: Denver Metro League
- Team name: Bulldogs
- Newspaper: The Santa Fe Trail

St. Joseph's High School (commonly referred to as "St. Joe") was a fully accredited Catholic high school located at 601 Fox Street in Denver, Colorado, United States. It was one of several parochial high schools in the Denver Metropolitan Area. Saint Joseph's High School served students in grades 9 through 12. The entire student body averaged less than 300 students. It was built in one of the original settlement areas of historic Denver. The adjoining Saint Joseph Church is on the National Register of Historic Places.

Saint Joseph's High School

== History ==
In the early 1900s, Saint Joseph Parish was one of the largest parishes in Denver. It served the area south of Colfax Avenue and west of Cherry Creek. "St. Joseph School, which had been squeezing kindergarten through ninth-grade pupils into the church basement, built a $29,000, brick, three-story facility at 601 Fox Street in 1908. A high school program initiated that fall featured a practical business curriculum designed to make its graduates employable." In later years, Saint Joseph Parish was split into Saint Francis to the south and Presentation to the west.

The first graduation class from St. Joseph's High School was the class of 1911. There were five students that graduated that year, all girls. Records indicate that there were two graduates in the class of 1913, three from the class of 1915, and five from the class of 1916. The class of 1917 had four graduates, 1918 had one, 1919 and 1920 had three graduates each. The class of 1921 was the largest to date, with nine graduates. It was also the first class with a male graduate.

The class of 1929 was the first to publish a yearbook. It featured photographs of the twenty graduating seniors, ten boys and ten girls.

== Academics ==
Saint Joseph's academic year followed the semester system. This provided for the school's core of college prep, honors, basic courses, and a selection of academic electives. The school also offered foreign language classes in Spanish, German, Latin, and French. There were also music and performing arts classes along with concerts and plays. Its journalism class produced the school newspaper and yearbook The Santa Fe Trail.

== Sports ==
Parishioners donated much of the labor and materials for the gymnasium, which was constructed in 1950. Saint Joseph earned many team and individual championships in its history. They participated in the Denver Parochial League and then later in the Denver Metro League. Notable achievements were earned in football, basketball, baseball, boxing, and wrestling. The school also had track, cross-country, and golf teams.

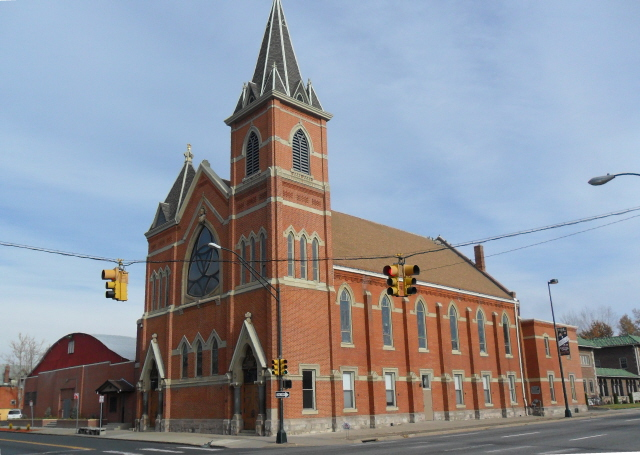
Saint Joseph Church and Gymnasium

== God and country ==
"During World War II, St. Joseph parish more than proved its patriotism. The church made itself a center for USO activities to comfort and entertain the military. Nuns and parish women taught school children to knit, quilt, and make scrap books that were sent to fighting men overseas. The school's Genes Club, made up of future secretaries and stenographers, sent letters of encouragement to the many men of St. Joseph's at the front. Students also worked on scrap metal and war material drives as well as war bond sales."

Saint Joseph alumni have fought and served in the armed forces in every American conflict from World War II to the Persian Gulf War.

== Closure ==
The Redemptorist parish funded the high school expenses not covered by tuition until its last few years, when the Archdiocese of Denver took over responsibility. Saint Joseph's High School was closed by the Archdiocese of Denver in 1973. Along with Saint Francis and Cathedral high schools, it was merged into a new school, Central Catholic High School; but in 1982 this also was closed.

In 1998 the school building became the home of the newly-formed Bienestar Family Services Center, a division of Centro San Juan Diego, the Hispanic ministry of the Archdiocese of Denver. Sister Alicia Cuarón, one of the founders of the Center, relocated it to the Centro San Juan Diego in 2004.

== Notable alumni ==
- J. Edward Guinan, community activist and founder of the Community for Creative Non-Violence
- James Leprino, a self made billionaire, is Chairman and CEO of Leprino Foods. In 2016 Forbes magazine listed his net worth at around $3.3 billion. for which he is listed as the 211th-richest person in world.
