= Samaritan: The Mitch Snyder Story =

1986 American television film

- Genre: Drama
- Screenplay by: Clifford Campion
- Directed by: Richard T. Heffron
- Starring: Martin Sheen; Roxanne Hart; Cicely Tyson
- Theme music composer: Craig Safan
- Country of origin: United States
- Original language: English

Production
- Executive producers: Charles W. Fries; Irv Wilson
- Producers: Deborah Joy LeVine; Debbie Robins
- Production location: Washington, D.C.
- Cinematography: Hanania Baer
- Editor: Scott C. Eyler
- Running time: 96 minutes
- Production companies: LeVine-Robins Productions; Fries Entertainment

Original release
- Network: CBS
- Release: May 19, 1986

Samaritan: The Mitch Snyder Story is a 1986 American television film directed by Richard T. Heffron and starring Martin Sheen as homeless activist Mitch Snyder. It features the Community for Creative Nonviolence, founded by J. Edward Guinan, and Snyder's work there.

== Cast ==
- Martin Sheen as Mitch Snyder
- Cicely Tyson as Muriel
- Roxanne Hart as Carol Fennelly
- Stan Shaw as Harold Moss
- Joe Seneca as Reverend
- James Avery as Hank Dudney
- Guy Boyd as Tom
- Janet Carroll as Susan Baker
- Jordan Charney as Pete Stark
- Brett Cullen as Billy
- Conchata Ferrell as Ida Sinclair
- James Handy as Melvin Mander
- Matthew Laurance as Max
- Dey Young as Cathleen
- Tim Russ
- John Wesley
- Ron Canada as D.C. Police Officer

== Accolade ==
For her performance in the film, Cicely Tyson won the NAACP Image Award for Outstanding Actress in a Television Movie, Mini-Series or Dramatic Special.
