= Promises to Keep (film) =

1988 film

- Produced by: Ginny Durrin
- Production company: Durrin Productions
- Release date: 1988
- Countries: United States; Canada
- Language: English

Promises to Keep is a 1988 documentary film produced by Ginny Durrin. Its subject is the advocate Mitch Snyder and the Community for Creative Non-Violence, founded by J. Edward Guinan. It was nominated for an Academy Award for Best Documentary Feature.
