= Sheptock =

Sheptock is a surname. Notable people with the surname include:

- Eric Sheptock (born 1969), American homelessness activist
- Frank Sheptock (born 1963), American football player
