= Eileen Egan =

American Catholic journalist (1912–2000)

Eileen Egan

Eileen Egan (1912–2000) was an American journalist, Catholic activist, and co-founder of the Catholic peace group American PAX Association and its successor Pax Christi USA, the American branch of Pax Christi.

In 1943 she became an active member of Catholic Relief Services, and a longtime friend of Dorothy Day and Mother Teresa, whose biography she wrote, Such A Vision: Mother Teresa, the Spirit, and the Work. She also marched with Martin Luther King Jr. at Selma. She coined the term seamless garment to describe the unity of Catholic teaching that all human life is sacred and should be protected by law.

== Early life and education ==
Born in Wales, she moved with her family to New York City in 1926 and completed her secondary education at Cathedral High School. She later graduated from Hunter College in 1933 and began a career as a freelance journalist.

== Career ==
In 1943 she joined the staff of the U.S. Bishops' War Relief Services (later known as Catholic Relief Services, or CRS) as its first professional layperson. Her first assignment was in Mexico, where she worked with displaced Polish war refugees. The following year she was posted to Barcelona, where she ministered to victims of the Holocaust. She then headed the CRS office in Lisbon, Portugal.

Back in New York briefly in 1945, she was out of the office the July day a B-25 crashed into the CRS headquarters on the seventy-ninth floor of the Empire State Building. Ten fellow staff members were killed. The following year, Egan was back in Europe helping to resettle waves of displaced persons. Writer Mike Aquilina observed that "...these works of mercy might involve carefully planned news leaks, sifting through propaganda or misinformation campaigns, or even ... using Chicago's Polish vote to protect Polish refugees." She later received the highest honor awarded civilians by both the French and German governments.

In the course of her work, Egan visited Palestinian refugees in Gaza, Chinese exiles in Hong Kong, and displaced civilians in Pakistan, Korea and Vietnam. In 1955 she met Mother Teresa in Calcutta. She was Mother Teresa's official biographer and helped introduce the latter's work in the West.

Egan combined CRS's practical work of providing economic assistance, food, housing, and transportation to war victims with speaking, writing and demonstrating against the causes of war. In 1962 she co-founded the American Pax Society, which under her leadership evolved into Pax Christi USA in 1972.

She marched with Martin Luther King Jr. at Selma, Alabama, had a major, behind-the-scenes hand in framing the "peace" statements of Vatican II, and promoted the work of Jean and Hildegard Goss-Mayr, crucial to the peaceful ouster of Ferdinand Marcos of the Philippines. One of her major achievements was the 1987 recognition of conscientious objection as a universal human right by the United Nations Commission on Human Rights (resolution 1987/46). She traveled widely with Dorothy Day, introducing her to Mother Teresa in 1970, and was with Day picketing for farm workers in California in 1973 when Day was arrested for the final time. In 1973 she brought Mother Teresa to Washington, DC, where the nun served the first bowl of soup at Zacchaeus Community Kitchen, run by Community for Creative Non-Violence founder J. Edward Guinan and Kathleen Guinan.

Eileen Egan was awarded the Pacem in Terris Peace and Freedom Award in 1989. It was named after a 1963 encyclical letter by Pope John XXIII that calls upon all people of good will to secure peace among all nations. Pacem in terris is Latin for 'Peace on Earth'.

Egan did not consider herself a pacifist. She did not care for the term "pacifist" because of its misleading echo in the word "passivity". She said that she used the term "gospel nonviolence, or "gospel peacemaking" instead. She argued that the so-called just war concept was an alien graft on the gospel of Jesus.

In 1992 at age 80, Egan was mugged on the way to Mass and had to go to a New York hospital with a broken hip and several fractured ribs. Her response to her attacker was one of care and forgiveness.

She died on October 7, 2000, aged 88.

== Legacy ==
Egan was named to the Hunter Alumni Hall of Fame in 1983. Catholic Relief Services created the "Eileen Egan Journalism Award" in May 1995 in honor of Eileen Egan. The Egan Journalism Fellowship was created by Catholic Relief Services to recognize journalists who demonstrate excellence in their reporting for Catholic media and to encourage them to increase their coverage of poverty and development issues overseas. In 2007, Pax Christi USA established the Eileen Egan Peacemaker Award to recognize a group or individual who has made a strong and extraordinary prophetic witness for peace in a time or situation of devastating violence or injustice.

== Works ==
- Transfigured night: the CRALOG experience, with Elizabeth Clark Reiss. Livingston Pub. Co., 1964.
- The works of peace. Sheed and Ward, 1965.
- The Catholic conscientious objector: the right to refuse to kill. Pax Christi, 1981.
- Dorothy Day and the permanent revolution. Benet Press, 1983.
- Such a vision of the street: Mother Teresa, the spirit and the work. Image Books, 1986. ISBN 0-385-17491-8.
- Catholic Relief Services: the beginning years; for the life of the world. Catholic Relief Services, 1988. ISBN 0-945356-00-5
- Prayertimes with Mother Teresa: a new adventure in prayer involving Scripture, Mother Teresa, and you, with Kathleen Egan. Image Books, 1989. ISBN 0-385-26231-0.
- Suffering into joy: what Mother Teresa teaches about true joy, with Kathleen Egan. Servant Publications, 1994. ISBN 0-89283-876-0.
- For whom there is no room: scenes from the refugee world. Paulist Press, 1995. ISBN 0-8091-0473-3.
- At Prayer with Mother Teresa, with Judy Bauer. Liguori, 1999. ISBN 0-7648-0339-5.
- Mother Teresa's prayer book. Canterbury Press, 1999. ISBN 1-85311-313-1.
- Peace be with you: justified warfare or the way of nonviolence. Orbis Books, 1999. ISBN 1-57075-243-5
- Blessed Are You: Mother Teresa and the Beatitudes, with Kathleen Egan. Ignatius Press, 1999. ISBN 0-89870-724-2.
