= Lutheran Volunteer Corps =

- Abbreviation: LVC
- Formation: 1979; 47 years ago
- Founded at: Luther Place Memorial Church
- Type: Non-profit
- Purpose: Full-time service and leadership program
- Headquarters: Washington, DC
- Region served: United States
- Members: 2,800 alumni
- Affiliations: ELCA
- Website: lutheranvolunteercorps.org

The Lutheran Volunteer Corps (LVC) is a full-time, volunteer service and leadership program. It was founded in 1979 by Luther Place Memorial Church in Washington, DC. Each year, LVC places approximately 100 volunteers in urban areas across the United States to work for social justice with various nonprofit organizations. The program lasts one to two years. The volunteers live together in the areas they serve and are encouraged to explore living simply and sustainably in intentional community.

Current placement cities include Baltimore, Maryland, Chicago, Illinois, Milwaukee, Wisconsin, Minneapolis–Saint Paul, Minnesota, Omaha, Nebraska, Washington, D.C., and Wilmington, Delaware. In the past, volunteers have also been placed in Atlanta, Georgia, Berkeley, California, Detroit, Michigan, Jersey City, New Jersey, Port Huron, Michigan, San Francisco-Oakland, California, Seattle, Washington, and Tacoma, Washington.

== History ==
In 1976, Luther Place Memorial Church in Washington, DC began to explore how the Lutheran community might initiate a voluntary service program. Luther Place and its senior pastor, John Steinbruck, were inspired by the Jesuit Volunteer Corps and the Mennonite Voluntary Service who had volunteers working in some of their outreach programs, such as DC Hotline and the Luther Place Night Shelter. After some discussion, a resolution was unanimously passed by the congregation, and in 1979 Luther Place organized the Lutheran Volunteer Corps (LVC).

The first full year of LVC began in August 1980 with nine one-year volunteers working in nonprofit service organizations in Washington, DC. In 1982, LVC expanded to 27 volunteers in Washington, DC, Baltimore, Maryland, and Wilmington, Delaware. In 2003, LVC was formally incorporated as its own nonprofit organization. On December 1, 2008, Lutheran Service Corps (LSC) of Omaha, Nebraska, joined Lutheran Volunteer Corps at the initiation of the LSC Board of Directors. LVC volunteers began working in Omaha in August, 2009. In 2019, LVC's 40th anniversary, approximately 100 volunteers served in eight cities across the United States.

== Core values ==
Social justice – LVC volunteers are placed in direct social service agencies or public policy organizations, working together for a peaceful world where basic human rights are met. LVC places emphasis on the injustice of racism, oppression, and privilege in its leadership development curriculum. Issue areas that are addressed through LVC include: food justice, legal aid, environment, housing, immigration, education, and health care.

Some example placements at which LVC volunteers have served are the AIDS Foundation of Chicago, Bread for the City, Urban Ecology Center, Lutheran Immigration and Refugee Service, and N Street Village.

Simple and sustainable living – LVC volunteers are encouraged to find ways to be more environmentally aware as well as work towards simplicity of time and focus on deepening relationships.

Intentional community – LVC volunteers live together in intentional community in order to encourage open communication and shared diversity. This creates a supportive space to engage in social justice, live sustainably, and explore meaning and vocation.

LVC takes action to invite, include, and empower a broad representation of people in all aspects of their work and program. LVC believes racism and oppression must be confronted through intentional and often uncomfortable personal and institutional transformation. LVC welcomes and encourages the full participation of people of all sexual orientations, gender identities, and gender expressions.

Exploring spirituality - LVC volunteers are encouraged to explore understanding of diverse beliefs and values. LVC welcomes and celebrates the participation of persons of any or no faith traditions.

LVC is the most religiously diverse faith-based volunteer program in the United States. Though LVC is affiliated with the Evangelical Lutheran Church in America, on average only about one third of the volunteers are Lutheran. One third are from other Christian denominations, and the last third come from a variety of other religious and spiritual traditions, including atheism and agnosticism.

== See also ==
- Community service
- Service learning
- Volunteerism
- Youth service
