= Alicia Cuarón =

American educator, women's and human rights activist, Franciscan nun

Sister Alicia Valladolid Cuarón
- Born: March 1, 1939 (age 87); Oxnard, California, US
- Years active: 1972–present
- Known for: Education and leadership development for low-income Latinas and Spanish-speaking immigrant families
- Awards: Colorado Women's Hall of Fame, 2008

Sister Alicia Valladolid Cuarón (born March 1, 1939) is an American educator, human rights activist, women's rights activist, leadership development specialist, and Franciscan nun. Since the 1970s, she has crafted numerous initiatives benefiting low-income Latinas and Spanish-speaking immigrant families in Colorado, including the first bilingual and bicultural Head Start program in the state, the national Adelante Mujer Hispanic Employment and Training Conference, and the Bienestar Family Services Center, today a ministry of the Archdiocese of Denver. In 1992, Cuarón joined the Sisters of St. Francis of Penance and Christian Charity, where she continues her efforts to promote education and leadership development among Spanish-speaking families. She was inducted into the Colorado Women's Hall of Fame in 2008.

== Early life and education ==
Alicia Valladolid Cuarón was born on March 1, 1939, in Oxnard, California. Her parents, Rosendo Alfaro and Guadalupe Valladolid (Perez) Cuarón, had immigrated to the United States from Mexico during the Mexican Revolution of 1910–1920. Her father was one of the "Cristeros" (followers of Christ) who helped smuggle Catholic priests and nuns across the Mexican border into the United States in the 1920s. She has four sisters and a brother.

At the age of 3 she moved with her family to El Paso, Texas. She went on to attend the University of Texas at El Paso, working in the university library to pay for her studies, and graduated with a B.A. in education in 1961. She is fluent in both English and Spanish.

== Career ==
Cuarón began teaching remedial reading and English as a second language in the first-grade special education program at Navarro Elementary School in El Paso. At the time, the student body was 90-percent Spanish-speaking and from poor families. She also taught in the Head Start program and in adult education classes.

Cuarón moved to Colorado in the early 1970s. She earned her M.A. in education in 1972 at the University of Northern Colorado in Greeley, and her Ed.D. at the same institution in 1975. While studying for her degrees, she instituted a bilingual and bicultural Head Start program in Denver, a first for the state. She later developed a bilingual and multicultural Child Development Associate Head Start program at the Metropolitan State College of Denver, where she was an assistant professor of education from 1974 to 1980.

In the 1970s and 1980s she conducted leadership training seminars for Latinas throughout the United States as founding director of EXITO (Institute for Hispanic Professional Development). In 1980 she co-founded the national Adelante Mujer Hispanic Employment and Training Conference, which attracted 1,000 women to discussions on education and career training.

Cuarón began working in the management consultancy field in the 1980s. She headed two consultancy companies, and also served as executive vice-president of Source One, an operations and facilities management firm.

== Keynote speaker ==
Cuarón was a popular keynote speaker for conferences run by corporations, charities, community colleges and universities. Her motivational talks for Latina audiences stressed education and leadership development, and she shared her own challenges and successes as a minority woman in the business world. She is one of the first Latinas invited to speak at Yale, Stanford, Berkeley, and Radcliffe Institute for Advanced Study at Harvard University.

== Franciscan nun ==
In 1992, Cuarón left her business career to join the Sisters of St. Francis of Penance and Christian Charity in Denver. She took her vows as a Marycrest Franciscan Sister four years later. Posted in a parish with many immigrant, low-income residents, she continued her efforts to promote education and leadership development. She was the founding director of the Familia Franciscan AIDS Ministry, and in 1998 established the Bienestar Family Services Center in the former St Joseph High School to provide adult education, career training, and support services for new immigrant families. In 2004, Cuarón moved the Bienestar Family Center to Centro San Juan Diego, the Hispanic ministry of the Archdiocese of Denver. Cuarón served as director of Bienestar from 2004 to 2014.

In 2003 Cuarón co-founded the Latina SafeHouse to support victims of domestic violence in Denver with "culturally and linguistically responsive behavioral health counseling, self-sufficiency, advocacy, and legal services". She assists with the annual "Vino y Chocolate" social event which is a fundraiser for various organizations and to which attendees bring wrapped gifts to be distributed to needy children at Christmas. Cuarón also initiated the FaithAction task force for the preservation of religious landmarks in Denver; the initiative is now part of Historic Denver.

== Memberships and affiliations ==
In 1980 Cuarón was named executive director of the Colorado Economic Development Association in Denver, becoming the first Latina to fill that role. She was also the first Latina to serve as Colorado State Fair Commissioner, and the first woman appointed executive director of the National Hispanic Association of Construction Enterprises. She has served as chair of the Colorado Council on Working Women and national director of leadership, education, and educational development for the League of United Latin American Citizens. She is a co-founder of the Circle of Latina Leadership.

Cuarón is an executive board member of the Colorado's Women's Forum. She has also served on the Colorado Supreme Court Nominating Committee.

== Awards and honors ==
Cuarón has received accolades from numerous groups, including the American Jewish Committee, Big Sisters of Colorado, Chicana Service Center, and Denver Federal Executive Board. In 2000 she received the Maclovio Barraza Award for Leadership from the National Council of La Raza. In 2008 she was the recipient of the Colorado Women's Chamber of Commerce ATHENA Award, and in 2009 the Colorado Rockies Community Award. Cuarón was honored as "Woman of the Year" by the Colorado Hispanic Chamber of Commerce, and named one of the "100 Most Influential Hispanics in America" by Hispanic Business magazine. She was inducted into the Colorado Women's Hall of Fame in 2008.

== Personal life ==
Cuarón has one daughter, Alexis Maritza-Cuarón Anderten.

== Sources ==
- Catlett, Sharon R. (2007). Farmlands, Forts, and Country Life: The Story of Southwest Denver. Big Earth Publishing. ISBN 978-1565795457.
- Telgen, Diane, ed. (1993). Notable Hispanic American Women. Vol. 1. VNR AG. ISBN 0810375788.
- Adelante, Mujer Hispana: A Conference Model for Hispanic Women. United States Women's Bureau. 1980.
