= Bread for the City =

Charity in Washington, D.C., United States

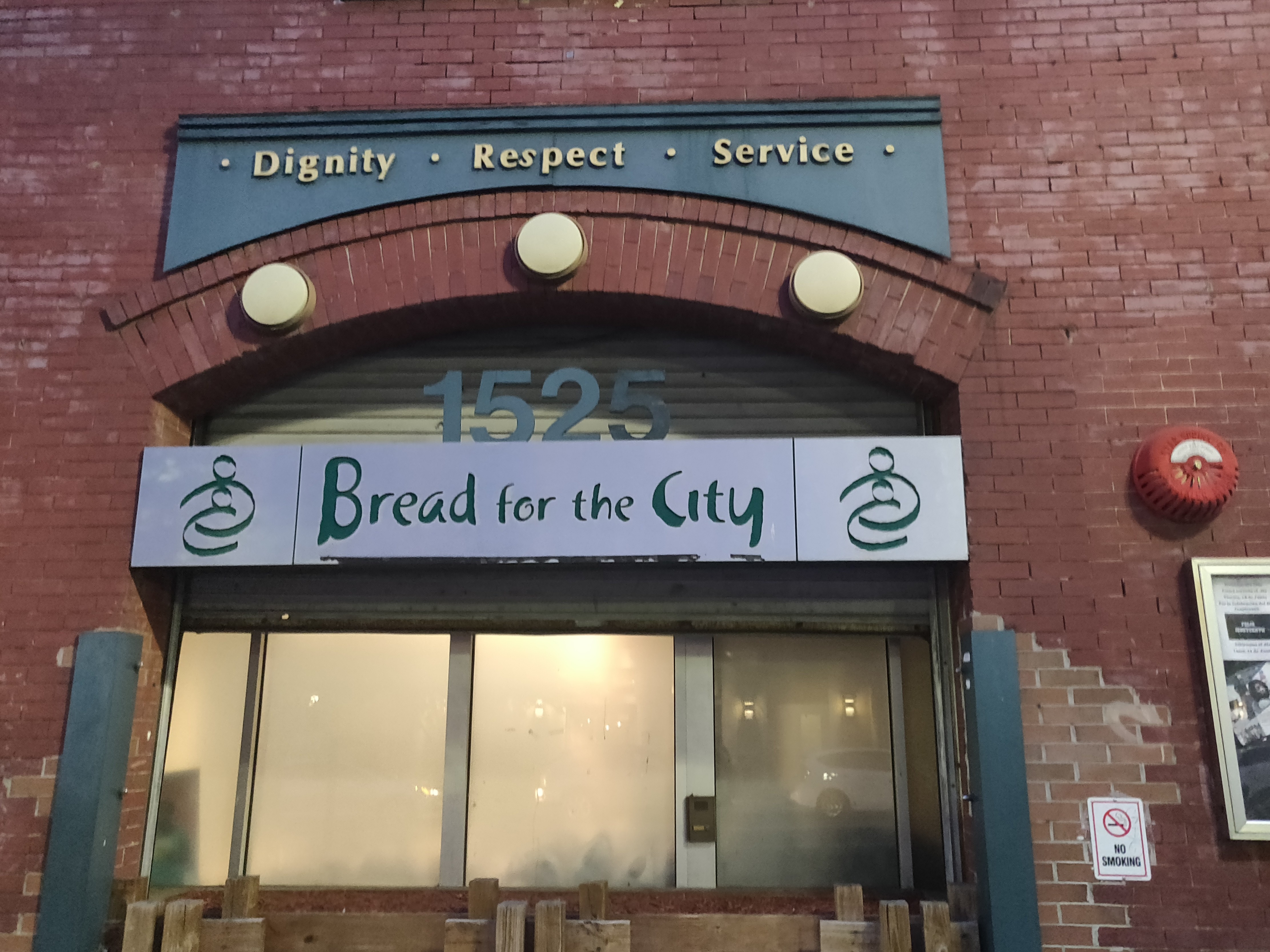
Bread for the City houses in the George M. Barker Company Warehouse building

Bread for the City is a comprehensive front line agency serving the poor of Washington, D.C., USA. The agency began as two organizations: Zacchaeus Free Clinic, and Bread for the City, a project by a coalition of downtown DC churches created in 1974 to feed and clothe the poor. As of 2011 Bread for the City offered food, clothing, social services, legal representation and medical care without charge to eligible DC residents.

== History ==
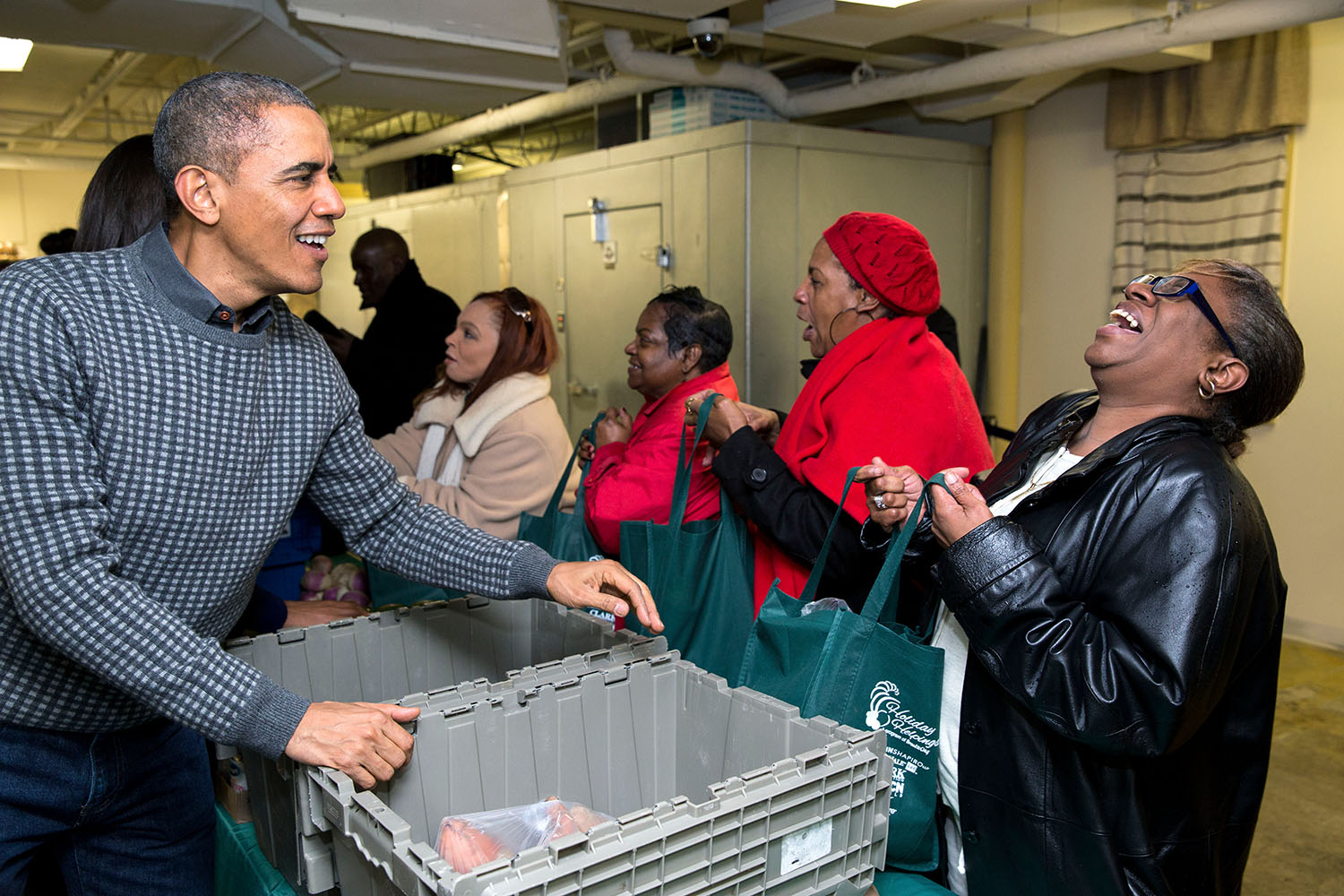
Barack Obama volunteering for Thanksgiving, 2014

Bread for the City began as two separate organizations. One was its namesake, Bread for the City, started in 1974 by the Emmaus Fellowship, a coalition of five churches in downtown Washington, DC, in order to feed and clothe the poor. Also started in 1974 was the volunteer-run Zacchaeus Free Medical Clinic, an outgrowth of the Community for Creative Non-Violence (CCNV), a group of activist ministries working to ensure that every DC resident had access to food, shelter, clothing and medical care.

J. Edward Guinan and Kathleen Guinan opened Zacchaeus Free Clinic in 1974, and recruited Dr. Jack Bresette. They worked in cramped basement quarters with three exam rooms, a small lab and pharmacy, and a US$30,000 budget. Both the clinic and Bread for the City were run by volunteers and located on rent-free property owned by Luther Place Memorial Church. In 1977, Bread for the City hired its first full-time director.

During the 1980s, Bread for the City experienced a growth in demand for its services and began to serve around 3,000 clients per month. It opened satellite offices throughout Northwest DC, and in 1991 it opened its first satellite office in Southeast DC. During the early 1990s, the two burgeoning organizations developed the Jane Addams Social Services Program to help clients of both organizations apply for public benefits. In 1990, BFC and ZFC were awarded two federal grants to operate outreach activities to help elderly and disabled individuals apply for Food Stamps and Supplemental Security Income. The launch of this program began the integration of the services offered by the two agencies, a process that ultimately led to their merger.

After one year of running the Jane Addams Social Services Program, it became evident that many eligible clients were being denied public benefits. The Young Lawyers Section of the Bar Association of The District of Columbia approached ZFC with a proposal to supply volunteer attorneys, and the organization leveraged their support to battle these unfounded denials. The Bread for the City Legal Clinic grew from this initiative, and a full-time legal director was hired in 1993.

Because they were working closely together, sharing many clients, and outgrowing their properties, the two organizations purchased together an abandoned lumber warehouse at 1525 7th Street in the Shaw neighborhood and launched a $1.2 million capital campaign to finance the building’s extensive renovation, which was completed by April 1994. By 1995, the agencies officially merged and adopted the name Bread for the City in the year 2000. In 2001 Bread for the City launched a campaign to extend its services to Southeast DC. The new Southeast Center opened in October 2002.

In response to the need in the District for financial management services for residents living with mental illness and subsisting on Supplemental Security Disability Income, BFC started its representative payee program in 2002 in cooperation with the DC Department of Mental Health in order to prevent vulnerable adults from mishandling their income and becoming homeless.

In 2004, Bread for the City won the Washington Post Award for Excellence in Nonprofit Management, acknowledging the organizations core values of dignity and respect and its success in community organizing.

These accomplishments led to the 2006 organization of BFC’s Advocacy Program. While BFC has been advocating on behalf of low-income DC residents since its inception, 2006 marked the official establishment of our Advocacy Program. The primary objectives of the Advocacy Program are to influence policy and yield systemic change that will impact the root causes of poverty. The current focus is on housing, nutrition, and client self-advocacy.

Today, Bread for the City offers its six primary programs from two Centers in Northwest and Southeast DC, which serve an average of 10,000 DC residents every month. All programs are provided at no cost to the client and in an atmosphere of dignity and respect.

== Programs ==
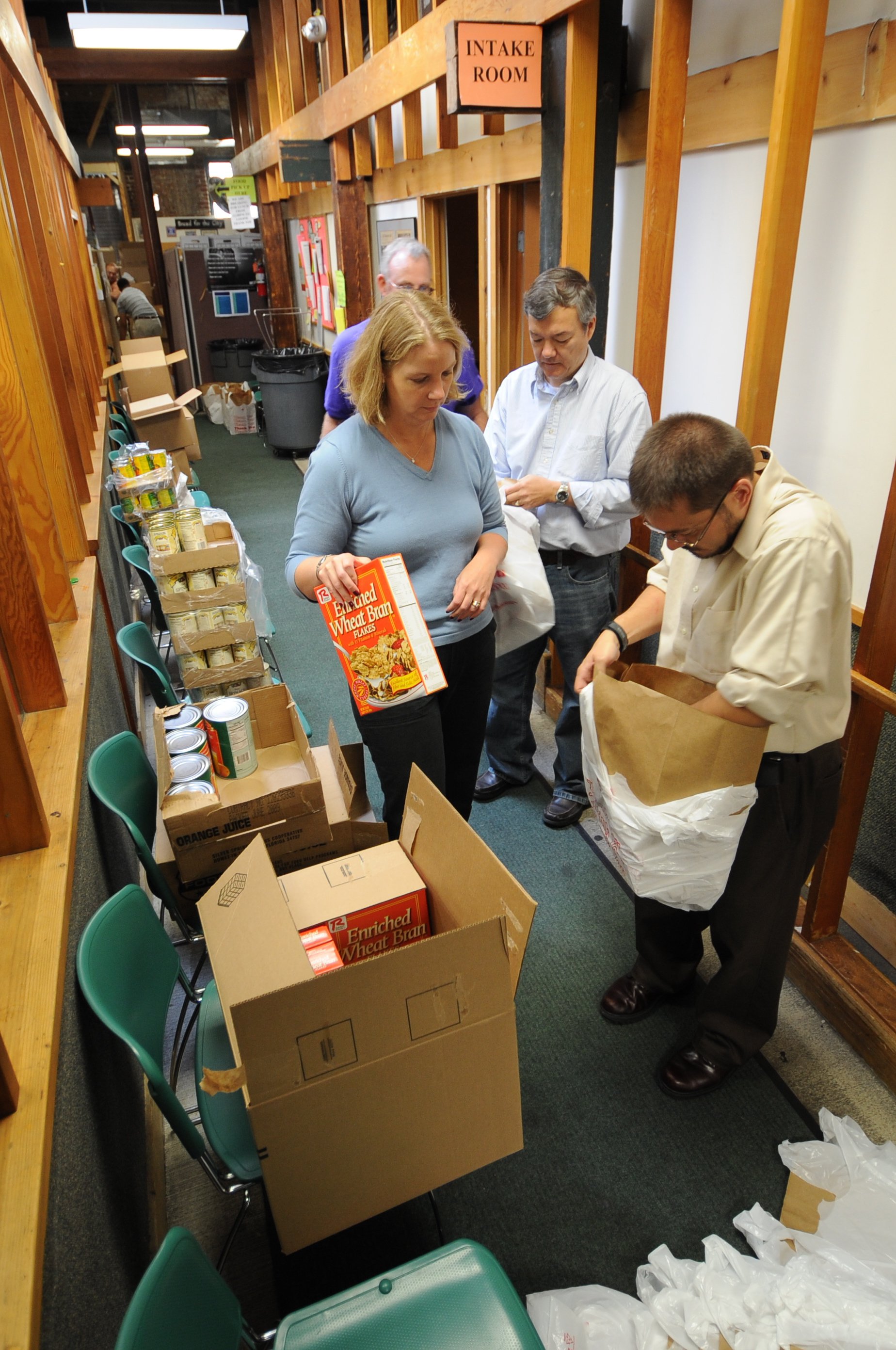
Activities at the Bread for the City Food Bank, 2009

Bread for the City offers food, clothing, social services, legal representation and medical care for free to eligible residents of Washington, DC.

=== Food ===
Bread for the City provides a three-day supply of groceries once a month to clients who fit the following criteria:

- Are below 200% of the Federal Poverty level, AND
- Are elderly (over 60), or
- Have children under 18 living with them, or
- Have a disability that prevents them from working.

BFC has recently focused its efforts to provide healthier food options to clients, working with a nutritionist to provide a healthy variety of foods. Bread for the City has eliminated trans fats from the food bags and replaced red meat with fish, pork and poultry. In 2005 the agency created the Fit for Fun program, offering regular medical visits and check-in calls, one-on-one nutrition and exercise consultations, and monthly classes meant to teach clients how to make nutritious meals from the ingredients typically found in the bags.

Through its Glean for the City program, started in the summer of 2009, Bread for the City has collected nearly 30,000 of fresh surplus produce from local farms.

=== Clothing ===
Bread for the City operates a clothing room in its Southeast Center that accepts and distributes clothing donations for free.

=== Social services ===
Bread for the City offers long-term case management for clients applying for public benefits, seeking housing or employment, or dealing with substance abuse, mental and physical health. Clients can walk in and see a case manager.

Through its Representative-Payee Program, BFC assists DC residents with long-term mental disabilities who have been referred by the Department of Mental Health or an affiliated Core Service Agency in managing their Social Security benefits (retirement or disability), Supplemental Security Income, or Civil Service Pensions.

=== Legal services ===
Since 1993, Bread for the City has offered legal advice and representation to its clients. BFC has 18 full-time staff lawyers and over 100 volunteer lawyers and paralegals who assist and represent clients in landlord-tenant disputes Social Security Disability Benefits appeals, and family law cases.

BFC also lends its building space to the Employment Justice Center, which protects and promotes the legal rights of low-wage workers in the DC metro area, the DC Bar Advice and Referral Clinic, and Legal Counsel for the Elderly.

=== Medical clinic ===
Formerly Zacchaeus Free Medical Clinic, Bread for the City's medical clinic offers affordable medical care to low-income and uninsured residents of Washington, DC. The clinic has two full-time staff doctors, two physician assistants, a clinical nurse, and over 50 volunteer physicians, nurses and medical administrators. Medical services offered to clients include adult general medicine, pediatrics, OB/GYN care and job physicals. The clinic provides examinations, medications, lab tests, and referrals at no charge.

== See also ==
- Supplemental Nutrition Assistance Program
- Food Pantry
- Capital Area Food Bank
- Luther Place Memorial Church
