= Mitch Snyder =

American activist (1943–1990)

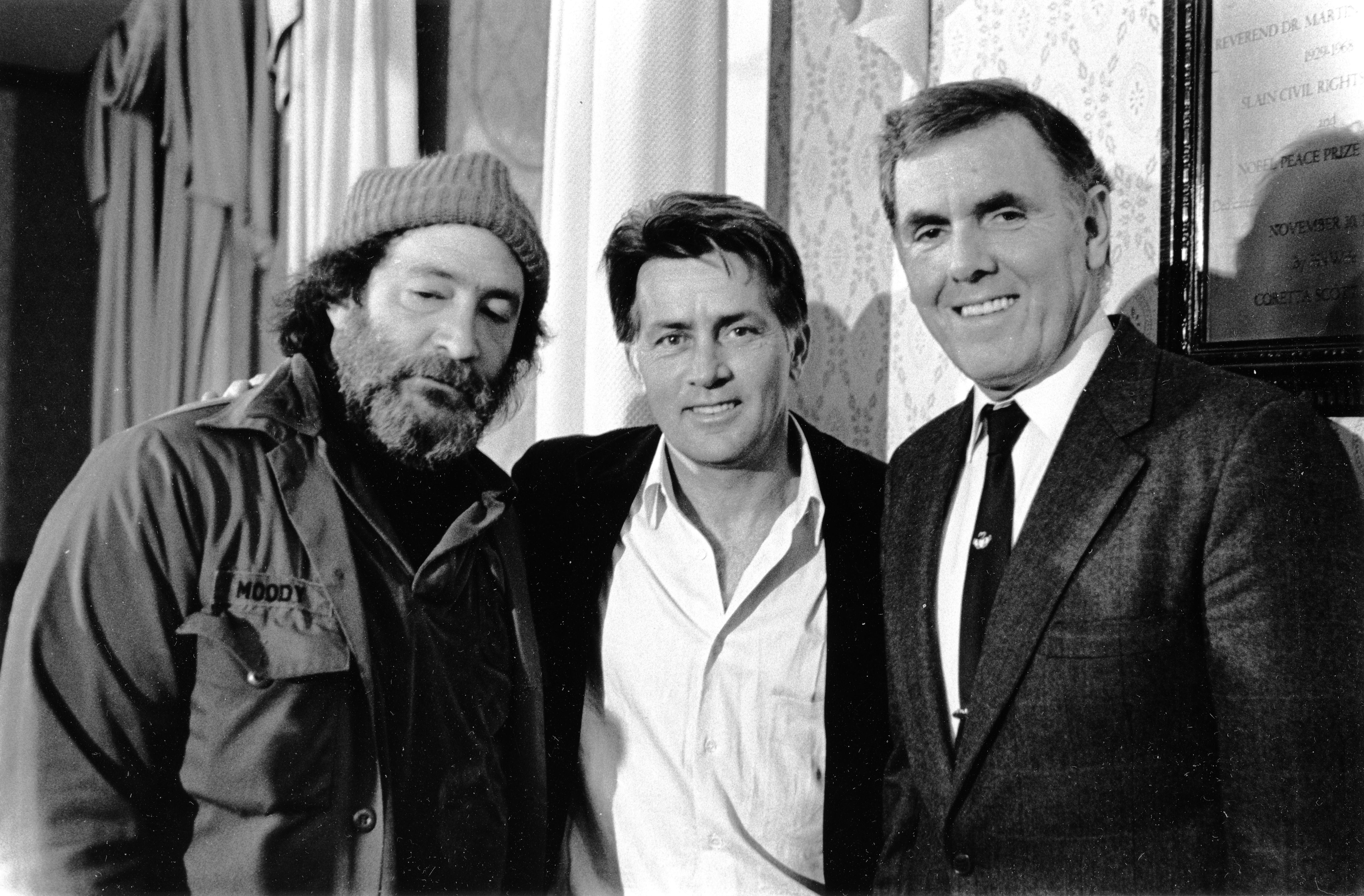
- Snyder (left) with Martin Sheen (center) and Ray Flynn (right), 1987
- Born: August 14, 1943; New York City, US
- Died: July 3, 1990 (aged 46); Washington, D.C., US
- Occupation: Activist for the homeless

Mitch Snyder (August 14, 1943 – July 3, 1990) was an American advocate for the homeless. He was the subject of a made-for-television 1986 biopic, Samaritan: The Mitch Snyder Story, starring Martin Sheen.

== History ==
Snyder grew up in Flatbush, Brooklyn, New York, where at age 9 his father abandoned the family. After a stint in a correctional facility for breaking into parking meters, Snyder worked in job counseling on Madison Avenue in New York City, as well as selling appliances and construction work. In 1969 he left his wife and children and started hitchhiking west. Police found him in a stolen vehicle, and he was arrested and convicted of grand theft auto. He served two years in federal prison, 1970–1972, for violating the Dyer Act, which outlaws the interstate transportation of a stolen vehicle. Snyder ended up in Danbury Federal Correctional Institution in Danbury, Connecticut, where he served time with Philip and Daniel Berrigan. Following meetings with them and prolific reading, especially of the Bible, Snyder started participating in hunger strikes and work stoppages over prisoners' rights issues.

== Affiliation with CCNV ==
Upon being released in 1973 Snyder came home to rejoin his family. Less than one year later he left his family again and joined the Community for Creative Non Violence (CCNV) in Washington, D.C., founded by J. Edward Guinan. CCNV was at that time operating a medical clinic, a pretrial house, a soup kitchen, a thrift store and a halfway house. CCNV came out of a discussion group about the Vietnam War at George Washington University. CCNV was also very active in nonviolent direct action in opposition to the Vietnam War. Snyder became the driving force of CCNV but worked with many deeply committed people including his wife and professional partner, Carol Fennelly; Mary Ellen Hombs, with whom he co-authored Homelessness in America: A Forced March to Nowhere; and Ed and Kathleen Guinan.

He and CCNV pushed and prodded the District of Columbia, the local churches and temples and mosques, as well as the federal government to open space at night for homeless people, and worked to staff the space that was made available. Through demonstrations, public funerals for people who had frozen to death on DC streets, breaking into public buildings, and fasting, CCNV forced the creation of shelters in Washington and made homelessness a national and international issue.

In the 1980s Snyder, Fennelly, and other CCNV activists entered and occupied an abandoned federal building at 425 2nd Street N.W. (now Mitch Snyder Place) and housed hundreds overnight while demanding that the government renovate the building. Under intense pressure, the Reagan administration agreed to lease the Federal property to CCNV for $1 a year. Later the Federal government transferred the property to DC. It remains the largest shelter in Washington to this day. Snyder fasted twice to force the Reagan administration to renovate the building. The first fast ended on the eve of Reagan's second election when Reagan promised to execute necessary repairs. Reagan failed to follow through on this promise, and litigation ensued. An Oscar-nominated documentary, Promises to Keep, narrated by Martin Sheen, follows that story and tells why a second fast was conducted. Sheen also played Mitch Snyder in the made-for-TV movie, Samaritan: The Mitch Snyder Story.

Angered that Holy Trinity Parish in Georgetown planned an expensive renovation of that historic church, and maintaining that the money involved should be given instead to the poor, Snyder stood in the middle of the congregation throughout the Sunday Mass for many weeks as a protest, while other congregants knelt or sat during the service as was customary.

In 1985, Snyder and CCNV hired sculptor James Earl Reid to create a display for the annual Christmastime Pageant of Peace in Washington which would dramatize the plight of the homeless. The display, titled "Third World America," featured a nativity scene in which the Holy Family was represented by contemporary homeless people huddled around a steam grate. The figures were atop a pedestal that stated "And Still There is No Room at the Inn." In 1986, Snyder and CCNV wanted to take "Third World America" on tour, but Reid refused. Snyder and CCNV sued Reid, claiming that "Third World America" was a work for hire under § 101 of the United States Copyright Act. In the case Community for Creative Non-Violence v. Reid, the U.S. Supreme Court ruled the sculpture was not a work for hire because Reid was not an employee under the general common law of agency. Thus, the work was not subject to the § 201(b) rule that when a work is made for hire, the employer is considered the author.

In 1989, Snyder gave a presentation at the American Library Association conference which was published in the journal, Public Libraries.

== Death ==
Three months before his death, Snyder and his companion of 15 years, Carol Fennelly, had announced that they would marry in September on the street in front of the 1,400-bed shelter that had been the focus of Snyder's work. But their relationship faltered and Snyder hanged himself in his room at the CCNV shelter on July 3, 1990, where his body remained for several days before being discovered. Snyder's suicide note spoke of Carol Fennelly, stating that he wished she loved him as much as he loved her.

He is survived by Fennelly, his ex-wife, and his two sons.

== Papers ==
A collection of primary source material related to Mitch Snyder is currently under the care of the Special Collections Research Center at The George Washington University. The materials include diaries, correspondence, legal documents, articles, photographs, and family papers.

== See also ==
- Thomas (activist)
- Guide to the Mitch Snyder Papers, 1970-1991, Special Collections Research Center, Estelle and Melvin Gelman Library, The George Washington University

== Sources ==
- "Mitch Snyder, 46, Advocate of Homeless". The New York Times. July 6, 1990.
- Gay, Kathlyn and Martin K. Gay. Heroes of Conscience: A Biographical Dictionary. Santa Barbara: ABC-CLIO Inc., 1996.
- Levitt, Steven D. and Steven J. Dubner. Freakonomics: A Rogue Economist Explores the Hidden Side of Everything New York: William Morrow, 2005.
- Community for Creative Non-Violence v. Reid, 490 U.S. 730 (1989).
