= Luther Place Memorial Church =

Historic church in Washington, D.C., United States

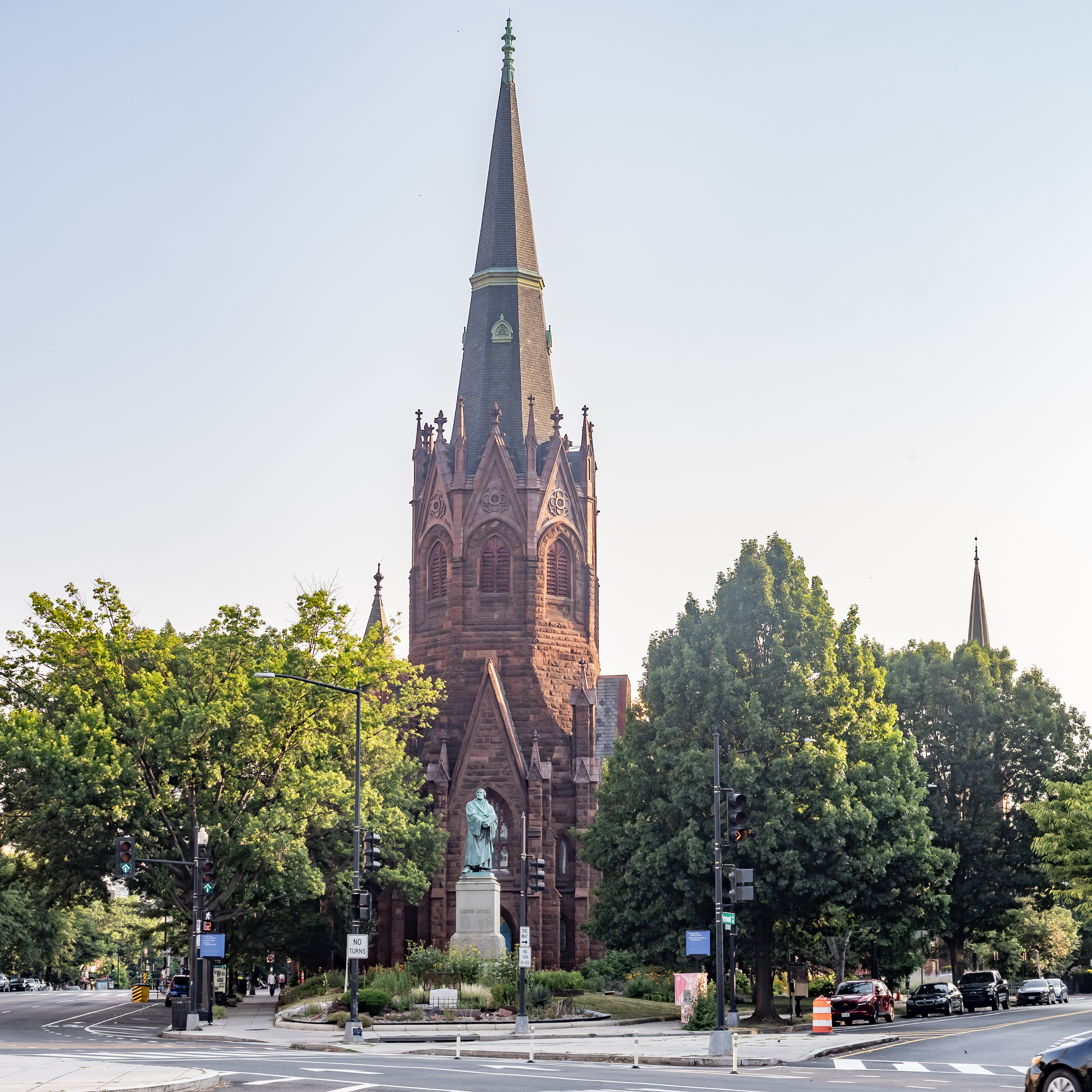
- A bronze statue of Martin Luther and the Gothic Revival tower of Luther Place Memorial Church (2024)
- Luther Place Memorial Church
- 38°54′25″N 77°1′56″W
- Location: 1226 Vermont Ave., NW. (Thomas Circle); Washington, DC
- Country: United States
- Denomination: Evangelical Lutheran Church in America
- Tradition: Lutheran
- Website: lutherplace.org

History
- Former name: Memorial Evangelical Lutheran Church
- Status: Church
- Founded: 1873

Architecture
- Functional status: Active
- Architect(s): Judson York, J. C. Harkness, and Henry Davis
- Style: neo-Gothic
- Years built: 1873
- Luther Place Memorial Church
- U.S. National Register of Historic Places
- U.S. Historic district – Contributing property
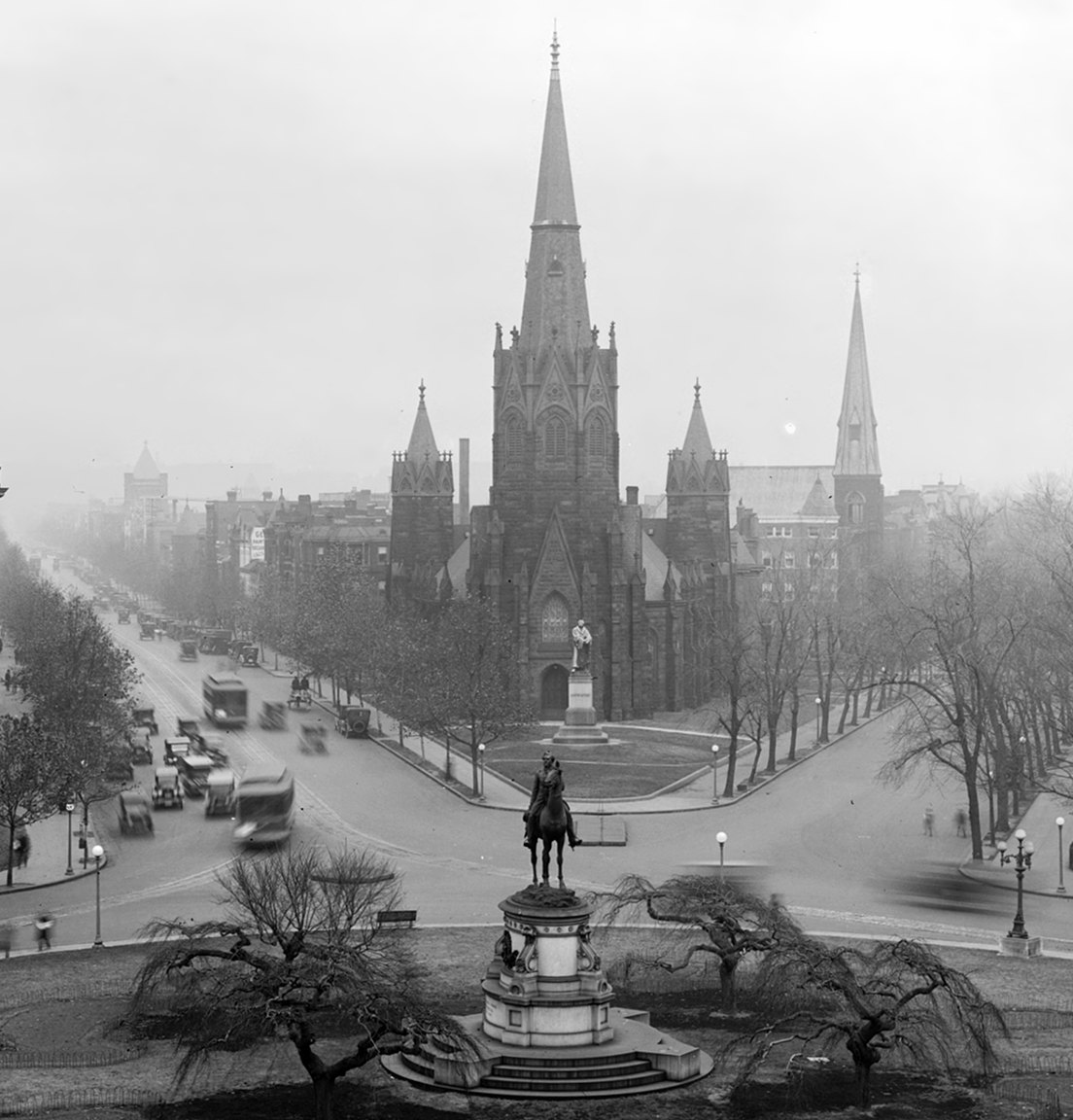
- Luther Place Memorial Church on Thomas Circle, ca. 1922
- Location: 1226 Vermont Ave., NW. (Thomas Circle); Washington, DC
- Built: 1870
- Architect: York, Judson
- Architectural style: Gothic
- NRHP reference No.: 73002096
- Added to NRHP: July 16, 1973

Luther Place Memorial Church is a congregation belonging to the Evangelical Lutheran Church in America. The neo-Gothic church building in Thomas Circle in Washington, D.C., was designed by architects Judson York, J. C. Harkness, and Henry Davis and constructed in 1873 as a memorial to peace and reconciliation following the American Civil War. Its original name was Memorial Evangelical Lutheran Church. The Luther Monument is situated in front of the church. The statue is a replica of the centerpiece of the Luther Monument in Worms, Germany, and was given to the church in 1884 by German emperor William I.

== History ==
Luther Place was built in 1873 by architects Judson York, J. C. Harkness, and Henry Davis. The church, like many others, resembles the shape of a ship, symbolizing a vessel for God's work, and it is well known for its stained glass windows picturing twelve reformers: Gustavus Adolphus, John Hus, John Wycliffe, Philipp Melanchthon, Martin Luther, Martin Luther King Jr., Dietrich Bonhoeffer, Harriet Tubman, John Knox, John Calvin, Huldrych Zwingli, and John Wesley. The church's exterior is covered with red sandstone from the Seneca Quarry, the same quarry that provided the stone for the Smithsonian Castle.

The church was dedicated as a symbol of healing after the Civil War. In 1904, Luther Place suffered damage from a fire, leading to restoration of the church and a renewed energy and celebration of its mission. President Theodore Roosevelt spoke at the restoration ceremony, saying, "The Lutheran Church is destined to become one of the two or three greatest churches, most distinctly American."

In 2007, the interior of the sanctuary was extensively restored.

== Initiatives ==
=== N Street Village ===
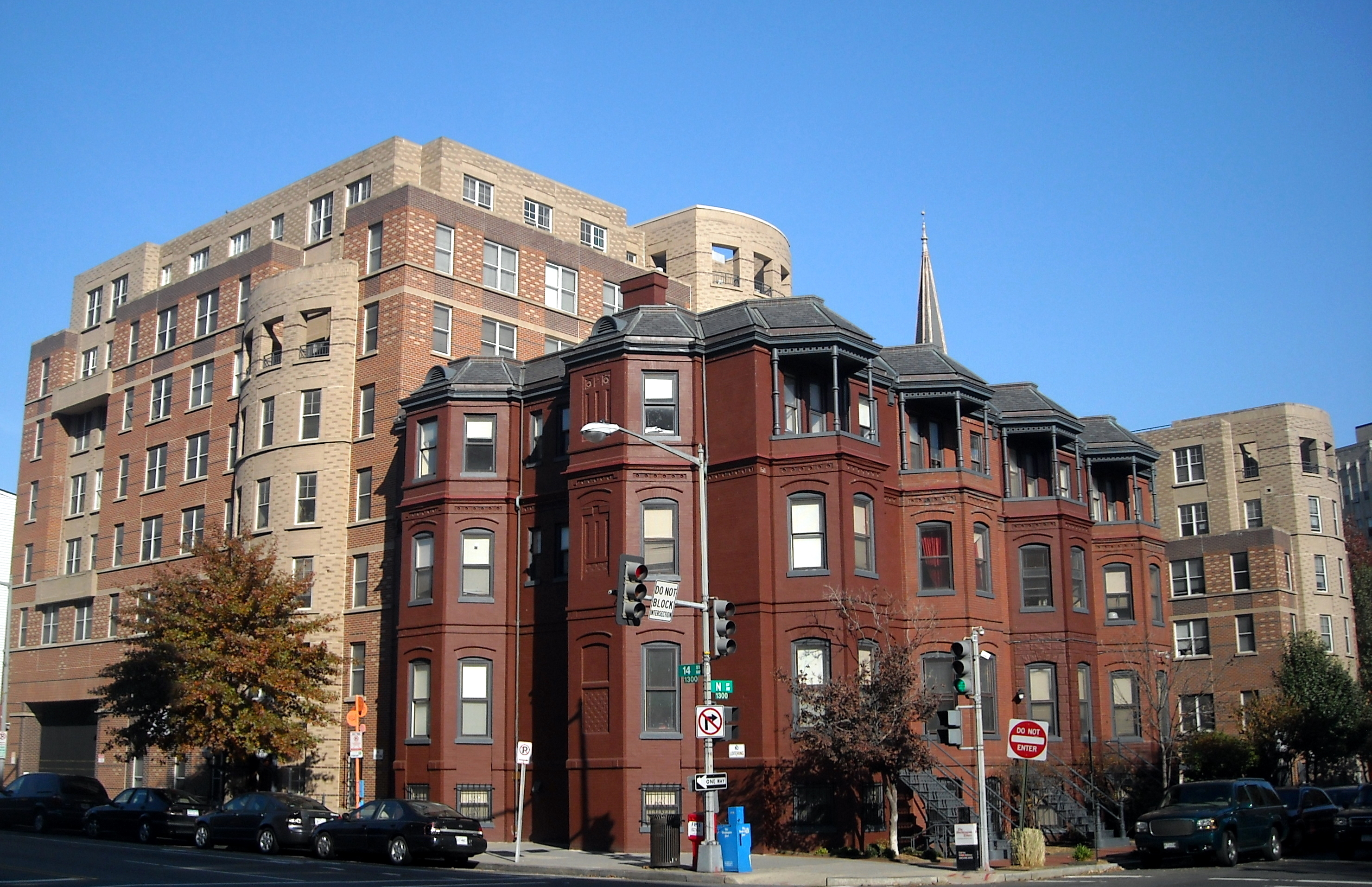
N Street Village

In the years after the fiery devastation along 14th street following the assassination of Dr. Martin Luther King in April 1968, Luther Place began to consider its property and location as an opportunity to help minister to the wounded of the city. In 1970, the church called a new pastor, John Steinbruck, who had served an innercity neighborhood in Easton, Pennsylvania. Under his leadership, the congregation began transforming dilapidated row houses on N Street into headquarters for faith inspired programs such as Bread for the City, Deborah's Place, Zacchaeus Medical Clinic, Sarah House, Bethany Women's Center, Dietrich Bonheoffer House, Abraham Welcome House, and the DC Hotline to help bring healing in the community. A multi-denominational religious community led by Luther Place, with a Protestant, Jewish, and Catholic coalition (ProJeCt), gradually created what was to become known as N Street Village. A critical step along the way was Luther Place's opening of its church doors to the homeless in the cold winter of 1976.

John and Erna Steinbruck, together with Luther Place congregation, founded N Street Village and created a vision and a challenge to the wider community that gained wide volunteer and financial support. In the late 1980s, Luther Place and its partners initiated a capital campaign to add a permanent night shelter at Luther Place and to build a new complex across N Street to house the various programs for homeless women that had evolved on and near the block. The multi-year effort raised $19.5 million in capital gifts and government grants, loans, and low income tax credits. Luther Place made its land available for the construction and a complex public private partnership was formed to meet the requirements of the government's low income tax credit program. In December 1996, a new facility that included Promise Place (housing for the programs for homeless women) and Eden House (51 apartments serving low and moderate income individuals and families) opened. This facility, along with the Luther Place Night Shelter, formed the core of N Street Village until two additional programs were brought into the Village; Miriam's House for women with HIV/AIDS and Erna's House, permanent supportive housing for homeless women. The set of programs now serves approximately 1000 women per year, estimated to encompass 63 percent of the adult homeless women population in the city.

=== Lutheran Volunteer Corps ===
In 1979, Luther Place founded the Lutheran Volunteer Corps as an organization that places young adults as volunteers with social justice-oriented non-profit organizations. It is now a national program that places nearly 150 volunteers in 16 cities. More than 2000 young adults have served in LVC and have gone on to become pastors, doctors, leaders in social justice programs, and similar callings.

=== Steinbruck Center for Urban Studies ===
Steinbruck Center Hostel

In 2001, the Steinbruck Center for Urban Studies was created as a means of educating others about the work of Luther Place and N Street Village. It is named for John and Erna Steinbruck.
