= Community for Creative Non-Violence =

U.S. non-profit organization

- Formation: 1970
- Purpose: Homeless shelter
- Headquarters: Washington, D.C., U.S.
- Region served: United States
- Executive Director: Rico Harris
- Main organ: Board of Directors
- Website: www.theccnv.org

The Community for Creative Non-Violence (CCNV) is a Washington, D.C.–based charity that provides services to the poor and homeless including food, shelter, clothing, medical care, case management, education and art programs.

== History ==
In 1970, Paulist priest J. Edward Guinan and some graduates of George Washington University founded and opened the Community for Creative Non-Violence, a communal home in Washington, D.C., dedicated to social change. Father Guinan had written the Paulist Council to establish a planned community, based on a poor and simple alternative lifestyle of service to others. Father Jack Wintermyer eventually found them a House on 23rd Street where they created a community house. The early CCNV community relied heavily on George Washington University for people and resources. After the Paulist Fathers approved the community, Guinan was joined by six people from GWU.

The community met at the Newman Center on GWU's campus and planned numerous protests. Guinan's statement of purpose at this time was "to resist the violent; to gather the gentle; to help free compassion and mercy and truth from the stockades of our empire."

Shortly after its founding, in 1972, the CCNV turned to running a soup kitchen near the White House, Zacchaeus Community Kitchen. In 1972 Mother Teresa—whom they did not know well because this happened seven years before the Nobel Prize, came with her friend Eileen Egan to serve the first bowls of soup when the kitchen opened, eating with the first guests. In 1973, the CCNV opened the Hospitality House providing medical facilities for the homeless. CCNV says they fed 200 to 300 homeless people a day, seven days a week.

In 1982, CCNV staged a protest in Lafayette Park across from the White House. The Department of Interior refused CCNV a permit to occupy Lafayette Park. The CCNV took it to court and lost on appeal. CCNV activists staged a homeless camp anyway and dubbed it "Reaganville". On Thanksgiving, 1982, six hundred homeless individuals arrived for a traditional dinner. CCNV continues to sponsor an annual Thanksgiving dinner for the homeless. The meal was first served in Lafayette Park, across from the White House, and later moved to the grounds of the U.S. Capitol.

Later, CCNV activists, joined by Mitch Snyder, entered and occupied an abandoned federal building and housed hundreds overnight while demanding that the government renovate the building. The Reagan administration agreed to lease the federal property to CCNV for $1 a year. On November 4, 1984, after Snyder fasted to draw attention to the plight of the homeless, President Ronald Reagan ordered the renovation of CCNV's shelter. A $14 million renovation was completed in 1988.
