= J. Edward Guinan =

American community activist (1936–2014)

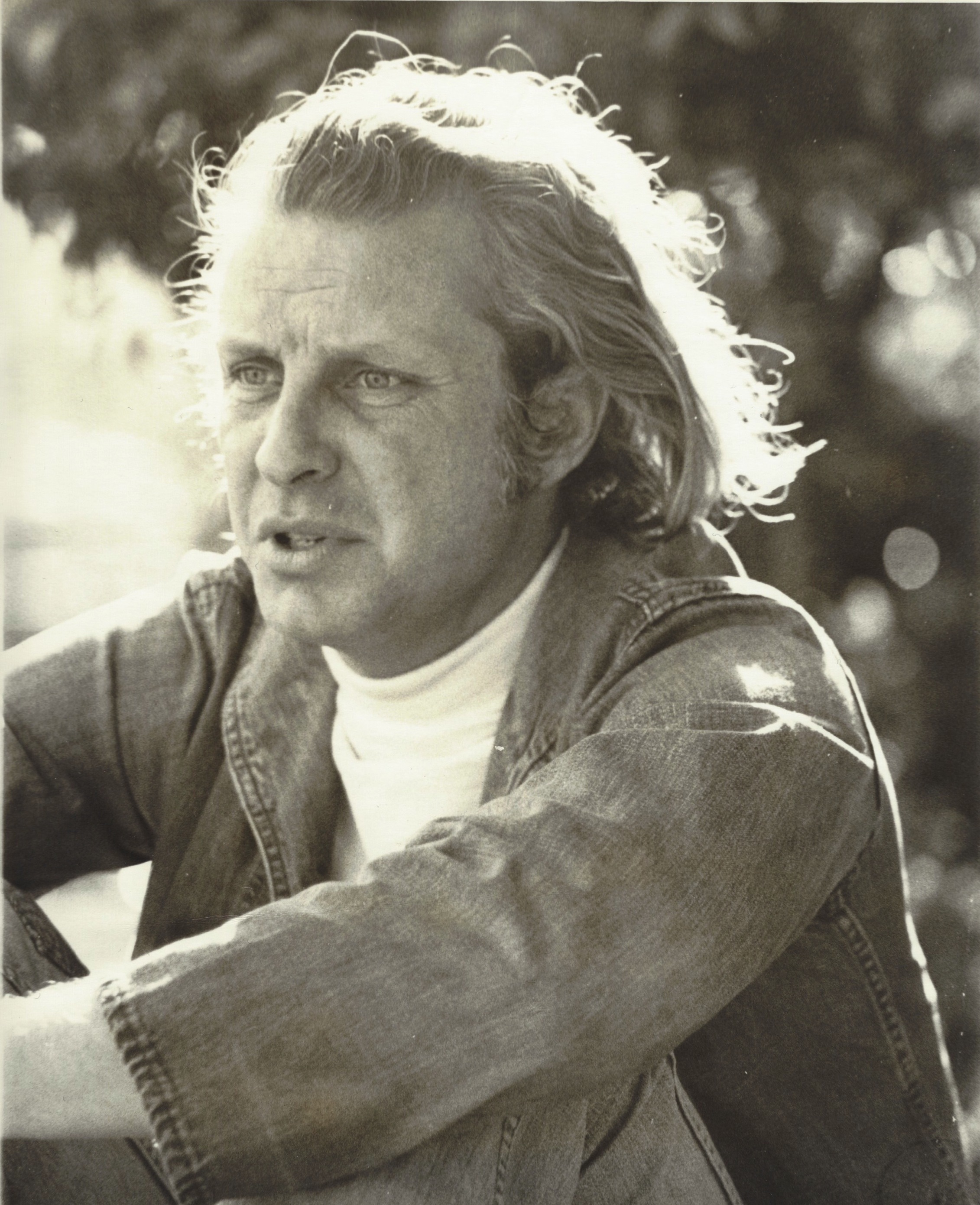
- Born: John Edward Guinan; March 6, 1936; Denver, Colorado, U.S.
- Died: 26 December 2014 (aged 78); Washington, D.C.
- Occupations: Community peace activist, author, former Paulist priest
- Years active: 1965–2012
- Known for: Founder, Community for Creative Non-Violence. Author of the first ballot for the Statehood movement in the District of Columbia.

John Edward Guinan (6 March 1936 – 26 December 2014) was a former stock trader who became a Paulist priest and founded Washington, D.C.'s Community for Creative Non-Violence in 1970. He engaged in public acts of nonviolent resistance such as prolonged fasting and peaceful civil disobedience in response to homelessness, hunger, the Vietnam War, the Indochina wars, and Henry Kissinger's legacy that brought national media attention. He was the first to put the initiative for DC Statehood on the ballot, and it won all wards of the district to kickstart the statehood movement.

== Early life and education ==
Guinan was born into a blue-collar family in 1936 in Denver, Colorado, the son of Edward Thomas Guinan and Gabrielle Huot Guinan, who were of Irish and French descent respectively. He attended Loyola grade school in Denver from 1942 to 1950 and Saint Joseph High School from 1950 to 1954.

=== Military service and college ===
Before college, Guinan served in the U.S. Naval Air Force from 1954 to 1957, at the U.S. Naval Air Station Barbers Point, Oahu, Hawaii. He worked as a radioman, and engaged in top-secret work countering China. After the Navy he enrolled in the University of Colorado Boulder in 1957 on the G. I. Bill. He graduated in 1960, majoring in international finance.

=== Stock trader ===
He became a stock trader in San Francisco, where he worked for Schwabacher & J. W. Strauss & Co., a third-market firm. He was a member of the New York, American, and Pacific Coast stock exchanges, and the National and San Francisco Traders Associations. He bought a Jaguar racing coupe, and said he enjoyed driving it to lavish company getaways in Acapulco and Mexico City. However, he also began volunteering in a ghetto behind Nob Hill several nights a week with a young Paulist priest friend, and "came to the conclusion that I'd rather respond directly to human suffering than perpetuate the wealth of the already wealthy..." He discerned a spiritual call to join the Paulist Fathers and left the financial world, giving his Jaguar and all his wealth away.

== Religious life ==
To become a priest, he completed a one-year novitiate from 1965 to 1966, including spending the summer of 1965 as an assistant chaplain in Berkeley, becoming deeply influenced by Mario Savio, whom he met, and the Berkeley Free Speech Movement. He engaged in the spirit of radical political dissent that was just starting there in the wake of the assassination of Malcolm X, which he said affected him even more deeply than that of John F. Kennedy. He moved to Washington, DC to attend St. Paul's College, the Paulist major seminary, from 1966 to 1971, while completing studies in philosophy and theology. There he volunteered in Anacostia, which was at that time the city's highest-crime neighborhood, and very poor. As a priest he counseled conscientious objectors against going to Vietnam.

Guinan was ordained a deacon in 1970 at the Cathedral of Mary Our Queen, Baltimore. His ordination as a priest was on January 16, 1971, at St. Paul the Apostle Church (Manhattan). From 1970 to 1974 he was active in the priesthood, and worked as associate chaplain of the Newman Center of George Washington University in Washington, D.C., where he also celebrated his first mass. He was deeply involved in the antiwar movement, and his "fiery let's-go-to-the-barricades" sermons on peace drew large crowds, according to the social justice journalist Colman McCarthy. Various student-run underground and campus papers nationwide began taking notice, even encouraging young people to travel to Washington to hear him.

=== First antiwar protest and arrest ===
He had his first experience with protest and arrest in 1971 when he attended the 1971 May Day protests against the Vietnam War, held at the US Department of Justice and sponsored by the Southern Christian Leadership Conference. This march and rally led to the largest mass arrest in U. S. history, and Guinan was one of over 12,000 people arrested and released.

=== Work with Martin Luther King, Jr. on the Poor People's Campaign ===
Guinan cited 1968 as the year that tipped the balance for him. He had contacted Martin Luther King Jr. to volunteer for the Poor People's Campaign and the march on the national mall on June 19, 1968, and he served as lieutenant. But King was assassinated in April. Speaking to a writer in the late 1970s, Guinan remembered 1968 as "[a]n explosive year for everyone: Tet, Biafra, Chicago, Johnson refusing to run, my working with King, his assassination, Kennedy's death, my traveling to New Hampshire with Eugene McCarthy, Thomas Merton dying – I'd been completing my thesis on Merton's theology of non-violence. That radical non-violence and critical way of looking at socio-economic-theological issues proved helpful in pulling my thoughts together. I came to feel things were much too symptomatic. You were chasing hunger and chasing war and chasing poverty and it was rooted somewhere. In the way economic and social orders evolve.

=== Peace Summer: contemplation and resistance ===
In the spring of 1972, Guinan's religious congregation allowed him to host peace activists at Mount Paul, the Paulist Fathers Minor Seminary and novitiate in Oak Ridge, New Jersey. They dubbed the conference Oakridge not just for the location, but as a nod to the hub of US nuclear arms buildup activity in the United States, Oak Ridge Tennessee. The two-month "Peace Summer" on the weekend of June 30 to July 1 drew over 1,500 people who organized and coalesced themselves into a movement. Catholic Worker founder and activist Dorothy Day attended, as did Catholic journalist and friend of Mother Teresa, Eileen Egan. During this summer Guinan met his future wife, Kathleen Thorsby, and invited her to work with the other activists in Washington, DC. Beyond the antiwar movement, he envisioned working on systemic issues affecting poverty and racism. The group wanted to feed hungry people, and opened a new house at 1008 K Street Northwest.

=== Community for Creative Non-Violence (CCNV) ===
Guinan perceived the need to establish a place of dialogue and input where people could think through and have significant input on city issues, the military industrial complex, and the Vietnam War. In 1969 he asked the Paulist Council to grant him the freedom to create a community on the principles of "common goods, shared responsibility and service-oriented – to live poorly, simply, to make ourselves available to others and see if it works." The response was a unanimous yes, which he said surprised him. He and a group of graduate student peace activists founded the Community for Creative Non-Violence in two houses, one directly on Washington Circle ("23rd Street House" at 936 23rd Street NW), and a second one known as the "Peace Study House" at 2127 N Street NW (21st and N) that offered nightly meetings and courses led by psychologist, conscientious objectors, and fellow Paulists delving into the mindset of violence and how it can transform to peace. This all grew out of the worship community of George Washington University. It was an interfaith enterprise, however, with Jewish, Baptist, and secular members alongside Catholics among the original founding group, and not officially connected to any church. Guinan and the group drafted a statement of purpose, "To resist the violent; to gather the gentle; to help free compassion and mercy and truth from the stockades of our empire." With the help of House Speaker Tip O'Neill (D-Mass) and Marion Barry, the mayor of Washington, DC, in 1984 the group moved into a vacant federal building at 425 D Street NW, where it remains. McCarthy said it was "an unprecedented accord between the Reagan administration, the District government and the CCNV." It grew to 1,350 beds, becoming the largest such shelter in the US.

=== Zacchaeus Community Kitchen ===
At 905 New York Avenue NW, the group established Zacchaeus Community Kitchen on October 16, 1972. They placed it in a converted barbershop just six blocks from the White House to highlight the need. Over 500 people a day came from the beginning. Mother Teresa, who was still unknown either to the Guinnas or to the US in general because this was seven years before she won the Nobel Peace Prize, came with her friend Eileen Egan, the latter of whom was already friendly with Fr. Guinan. Mother Teresa and Egan served the first bowls of soup, eating with the first guests. Dorothy Day also visited from time to time, and was closely involved with the growth of the communities. Hélder Câmara the self-identified socialist Bishop and advocate of Liberation Theology visited as well. The venue was busy and popular, but they were also threatened with eviction in 1973 for attracting the wrong element to the building, making headlines: "We have come to feed the hungry, and we intend to insist on that right. The more fortunate will have to adjust." The Guinans also founded the Zacchaeus Free Clinic and recruited Jack Bresette, MD. The Zacchaeus organizations later merged to become Bread for the City.

=== Kissinger protest ===
On October 8, 1973, when Henry Kissinger received the Pacem in Terris award from the Center for the Study of Democratic Institutions, an incensed Guinan led a group of four other CCNV protesters to the event, known as Pacem in Terris III. They bought tickets, and seated themselves strategically around the auditorium at the Sheraton Park Hotel in Washington, DC. An attendee said that those present included "Hans Morgenthau, Bishop J. William Fulbright, George Will, Edwin Reischauer, Rexford Tugwell, Nelson Rockefeller, Henry Jackson, George McGovern, Stanley Hoffman, David Horowitz, Hubert Humphrey, Theodore Hesburgh, John Kenneth Galbraith, Elizabeth Mann Borgese, Clark Clifford, John Patton Davies, Sam Ervin, Frank Church, Leslie Gelb, David Halberstam, Marshall Shulman, Francis Fritzgerald, Jonas Salk, and Edmund Muskie," and also a number of celebrities such as Joanne Woodward and Paul Newman. Bishop Carroll Thomas Dozier even waved to Guinan when he saw him, because they knew one another from Pax Christi USA events, which the Bishop prominently supported.

Guinan and his group, which included activist Ted Glick who later wrote about it, brought automated laughing boxes. When Kissinger paused in his acceptance speech, Glick recalled that Guinan stood and said loudly enough for everyone to hear, "Henry Kissinger, it is an outrage that you are getting this award after the millions of deaths you are responsible for in Indochina." Others from the group shouted "We're laughing at you, Henry Kissinger. How can you keynote a convocation for peace?" Instead of stopping, the event continued and Kissinger kept speaking, reportedly saying "The prerequisite for a fruitful national debate is that the policymakers and critics appreciate each others' perspectives and respect each others' purposes." Then Guinan, Glick, and the others activated the laughing boxes from their various seats around the auditorium, causing an uproar. Rader writes, "Immediately, dozens of Secret Service men descended, grabbing over each other at the mechanical laughing boxes and trying to find a lever that would stop them. The audience watched in bewilderment. The boxes wouldn’t stop. Then four huge men in a panic threw the boxes to the floor, jumping and stomping on them. But the boxes kept it up: HA HA HA HA HA HA HA." This prompted the Secret Service to hand the protesters over to informal security (there were no professional guards), who removed them all, while the disruption was broadcast on national television.

Rader writes that other audience members joined the protest, shouting at Kissinger "What about the Christmas bombing, you barbarian!" while others defended him. Bishop Dozier was upset to realize Guinan was leading the ruckus. Although the action against Kissinger was controversial, much of the resulting news coverage, especially from Gloria Emerson of The New York Times, lauded the protesters. Jim Anderson of UPI was reported as saying, "Just for a change, it's nice to cover a riot that has a bit of class."

=== Eat-ins and public fasting ===
Guinan and his community became known for both direct action and creative protest, for example "eat-ins" with the poor at grocery stores, and long public fasts, both of which Guinan initiated. In 1972 Guinan went on a 21-day water-only fast to bring attention of the right of the poor to eat. He then broke the fast by going into a Safeway grocery store, eating bread from the shelves, and declaring "This bread has been stolen by Safeway from the children, from the elderly, from the hungry, from the farmers and farm workers. It is here in this store so that this monopoly may now steal from the consumers. People have a right to eat." In 1975 he and another CCNV activist, Michael Murphy, were found not guilty by a jury after they entered a grocery store, broke apart a loaf of French bread and shared it with other customers while TV news cameras rolled, "decrying unconscionable profiteering amid mass hunger."

His fast in 1975 protesting a mansion for a Catholic bishop was his most covered in national news. A group of Catholic businesspeople raised money to buy the Chase mansion in Washington, DC's Kalorama neighborhood, where Embassy Row is located. The mansion was considered one of the most beautiful in the city, and the media soon dubbed it the "Christian Embassy". Cardinal William Wakefield Baum purchased it from the group as his intended residence, prompting Guinan to go on what he intended to be a prolonged water-only fast to protest the extravagance and declare that the money should be spent serving the poor. Following a public outcry, Baum relented after Guinan had fasted for 27 days.

=== Pax Christi USA ===
Too many Catholics--and much of the structure--are not even knowledgeable about our own tradition… the 'just war theory' has to be deeply questioned.

— Then-Paulist Father J. Edward Guinan, C. S. P., speaking as the inaugural general secretary of Pax Christi USA, National Catholic Reporter, October 19, 1973

Guinan was the founding Director of Pax Christi USA, and became its first General Secretary. He organized the founding assembly, which was held at George Washington University on October 5–7, 1973. Many of the 350 participants had also joined pray-ins outside the nearby Nixon White House that summer. Guinan wished to counter Just war theory, using Pope John XXIII's Pacem in terris encyclical of 1963 to, in his words, "permeate the Roman Catholic consciousness and structure with its rich tradition of Catholic pacifism and gospel nonviolence which has always been with us, but which has for many centuries been overlaid with layers of argumentation and rhetoric and is very difficult to uncover." Dorothy Day spoke at that first meeting, saying the group was needed to counter U.S. involvement in Indochina. They adopted two resolutions, (1) to support the United Farm Workers of America in their "struggle for justice" during the ongoing lettuce and grape boycotts, and (2) countering the military's intention to form Reserve Officers' Training Corps (ROTC) groups on college campuses, with a focus on establishing peace programs rather than expending energy to fight ROTC. The latter became a point of conversation with his friend, Jesuit Richard McSorley of Georgetown University, who publicly and actively protested against ROTC at Georgetown.

Pax Christi USA differed from similar groups such as Catholic Peace Fellowship (Jim Forest) because, according to Guinan, it had "consultative status with the United Nations." Bishop Carroll Thomas Dozier of Memphis and Bishop Thomas Gumbleton of Detroit sent messages of support to the assembly, as did Cardinal Bernardus Johannes Alfrink of Utrecht, honorary chairman of the international body.

Guinan's participation only lasted a year, until the summer of 1974. He had become preoccupied with his public fasting, and was less drawn to day-to-day activities. Bishop Dozier was concerned both about the optics of the fast, and the protest of Henry Kissinger. Guinan's resignation letter was also a key to his personality. "I function very poorly in organizations and institutions, possibly an instinctual disbelief in the form; I abhor majority and distrust consensus, possibly an exaggerated belief in the individual; I oppose sacrificing the person for the greater Glory of God, which has brought me to the precipice of our present disagreement."

=== Wellspring Ministries ===
For 25 years from 1985 until he retired in 2010, Guinan was executive director of Wellspring Ministries, a nonprofit incorporated to serve adults living with developmental disabilities.

== DC Statehood ==
Guinan, a Statehood Party member, saw a DC statehood initiative as a way of bringing the benefits of being a state to the electorate, especially the poor. The statehood movement restarted after the death of Julius Hobson, when Guinan put statehood on the 1980 ballot as an initiative. He did not ask anyone in the self-determination movement, but instead drafted a statehood proposal, which led to initial controversy among those who thought the city wasn't ready. According to Asch and Musgrove, his initiative "required a four-step process: an up-or-down vote on the question of statehood, the election of forty-five delegates to a constitutional convention, the submission of a constitution to the voters for ratification, and, finally, an application to Congress for admission to the Union as the fifty-first state." Were DC to become a state, Guinan's proposal would have launched a legal process to create a constitution for the State of New Columbia and lobby congress for a statehood bill. Asch and Musgrove show how Guinan also hoped to establish a grassroots activist network "that would displace establishment leaders and empower citizens to address D.C.'s most pressing needs." The ballot question won all wards.

== Publications ==
Editor, Peace and Nonviolence, Paulist Press, 1973.

Co-author with the Catholic Bishops of Appalachia, "This Land is Home to Me: A Pastoral Letter on Powerlessness in Appalachia," 1975.

Editor, Redemption Denied: An Appalachian Reader, Gamaliel Press, 1976.

Editor, Flesh and Spirit: A Religious View of Bicentennial America, Gamaliel Press, 1976.

== Personal life ==
While he was still a Paulist priest, Guinan met Kathleen Thorsby, who had come to Washington, D.C., for the "Peace Summer" discussed above. He asked the Paulists for permission to become the first married priest, and he further petitioned the Vatican to abolish the rule that priests cannot marry. His request was denied by Pope Paul VI, so he left the Paulists. He and Thorsby married in July 1974, she took his surname, and they remained a married team until his death. Together they founded Zacchaeus Community Kitchen, and other cornerstone organizations that serve the poor. Kathleen Guinan has been CEO of Crossway Community since 1990. She is also a founder of Rachael's Women's Center, the first day shelter for women experiencing homelessness. They had four children. The couple received the WETA Hometown Hero award as DC citizens creating "positive change for underprivileged people."
