= Altruism (ethics) =

Ethical belief that actions are morally good only if they benefit others

In ethical philosophy, altruism (also called altruism, and ethical altruism) is an ethical doctrine that holds that the moral value of an individual's actions depends solely on the impact of those actions on other individuals, regardless of the consequences for the actor. James Fieser states the altruist dictum as:

"An action is morally right if the consequences of that action are more favorable than unfavorable to everyone except the agent."

Auguste Comte's version of altruism calls for living for the sake of others. One who holds to either of these ethics is known as an "altruist".

== Overview ==
The word "altruism" (French: altruisme, from autrui, 'other people', derived from Latin alter 'other') was coined by Auguste Comte, the French founder of positivism, in order to describe the ethical doctrine he supported. He believed that individuals had a moral obligation to renounce self-interest and live for others. Comte says, in his Catéchisme Positiviste, that:

[The] social point of view cannot tolerate the notion of rights, for such notion rests on individualism. We are born under a load of obligations of every kind, to our predecessors, to our successors, to our contemporaries. After our birth these obligations increase or accumulate, for it is some time before we can return any service.... This ["to live for others"], the definitive formula of human morality, gives a direct sanction exclusively to our instincts of benevolence, the common source of happiness and duty. [Man must serve] Humanity, whose we are entirely.

The Catholic Encyclopedia says that for Comte's altruism, "The first principle of morality... is the regulative supremacy of social sympathy over the self-regarding instincts." Author Gabriel Moran commented that "the law and duty of life in altruism [for Comte] was summed up in the phrase: Live for others."

Various philosophers define the doctrine in various ways, but all definitions generally revolve around a moral obligation to benefit others or the pronouncement of moral value in serving others rather than oneself. Philosopher C. D. Broad defines altruism as "the doctrine that each of us has a special obligation to benefit others." Philosopher W. G. Maclagan defines it as "a duty to relieve the distress and promote the happiness of our fellows... Altruism is to... maintain quite simply that a man may and should discount altogether his own pleasure or happiness as such when he is deciding what course of action to pursue."

== As consequentialist ethics ==
Altruism is often seen as a form of consequentialism, as it indicates that an action is ethically right if it brings good consequences to others. Altruism may be seen as similar to utilitarianism, however an essential difference is that the latter prescribes acts that maximize good consequences for all of society, while altruism prescribes maximizing good consequences for everyone except the actor. Herbert Spencer argued that since the rest of society will almost always outnumber the utilitarian, a genuine utilitarian will inevitably end up practicing altruism or a form of altruism. Effective altruism is a philosophy and social movement that maintains that the consequences of our actions — for ourselves and others — are important, and seeks to maximise the overall quality of these consequences.

In his book I am You: The Metaphysical Foundations for Global Ethics, Daniel Kolak argues that open individualism provides a rational basis for altruism. According to Kolak, egoism is incoherent because the concept of a future self is incoherent, similar to the idea of anattā in Buddhist philosophy, and everyone is in reality the same being. Derek Parfit made similar arguments in the book Reasons and Persons, using thought experiments such as the teletransportation paradox to illustrate the philosophical problems with personal identity.

== Criticisms ==
David Kelley, discussing Ayn Rand's views, says that "there is no rational ground for asserting that sacrificing yourself in order to serve others is morally superior to pursuing your own (long-term, rational) self-interest. Altruism ultimately depends on non-rational 'rationales,' on mysticism in some form..." Furthermore, he holds that there is a danger of the state enforcing that moral ideal: "If self-sacrifice is an ideal — if service to others is the highest, most honorable course of action — why not force people to act accordingly?" He believes this can ultimately result in the state forcing everyone into a collectivist political system.

Norwegian eco-philosopher Arne Næss argues that environmental action based upon altruism — or service of the other — stems from a shrunken "egoic" concept of the self. Self-actualization will result, he argues, in the recovery of an "ecological self", in which actions formerly seen as altruistic are in reality a form of enlightened self-interest.

German philosopher Max Scheler distinguishes two different ways in which the strong can help the weak, one which is an expression of love, "motivated by a powerful feeling of security, strength, and inner salvation, of the invincible fullness of one’s own life and existence" and another which is merely "one of the many modern substitutes for love, ... nothing but the urge to turn away from oneself and to lose oneself in other people’s business." At its worst, Scheler says, "love for the small, the poor, the weak, and the oppressed is really disguised hatred, repressed envy, an impulse to detract, etc., directed against the opposite phenomena: wealth, strength, power, largesse."

== See also ==
- Agape
- Altruism
- Egalitarianism
- Ethical egoism
- Mettā
- Solidarity
- Ubuntu
