= Catholic peace traditions =

Aspect of Catholic teachings

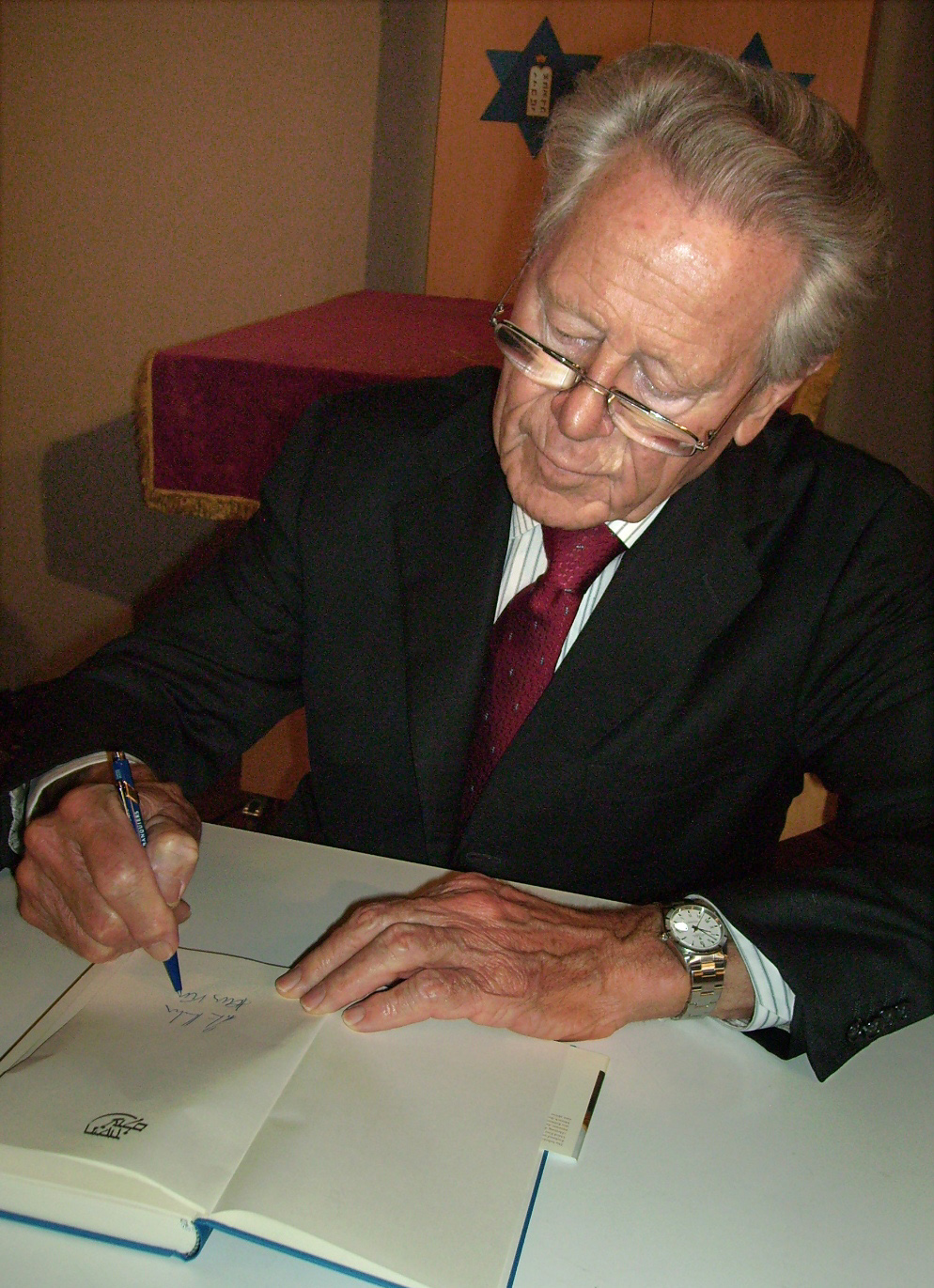
"There will be no peace among the nations without peace among the religions. There will be no peace among the religions without dialogue among the religions." Hans Küng, Swiss Catholic priest, theologian, and author

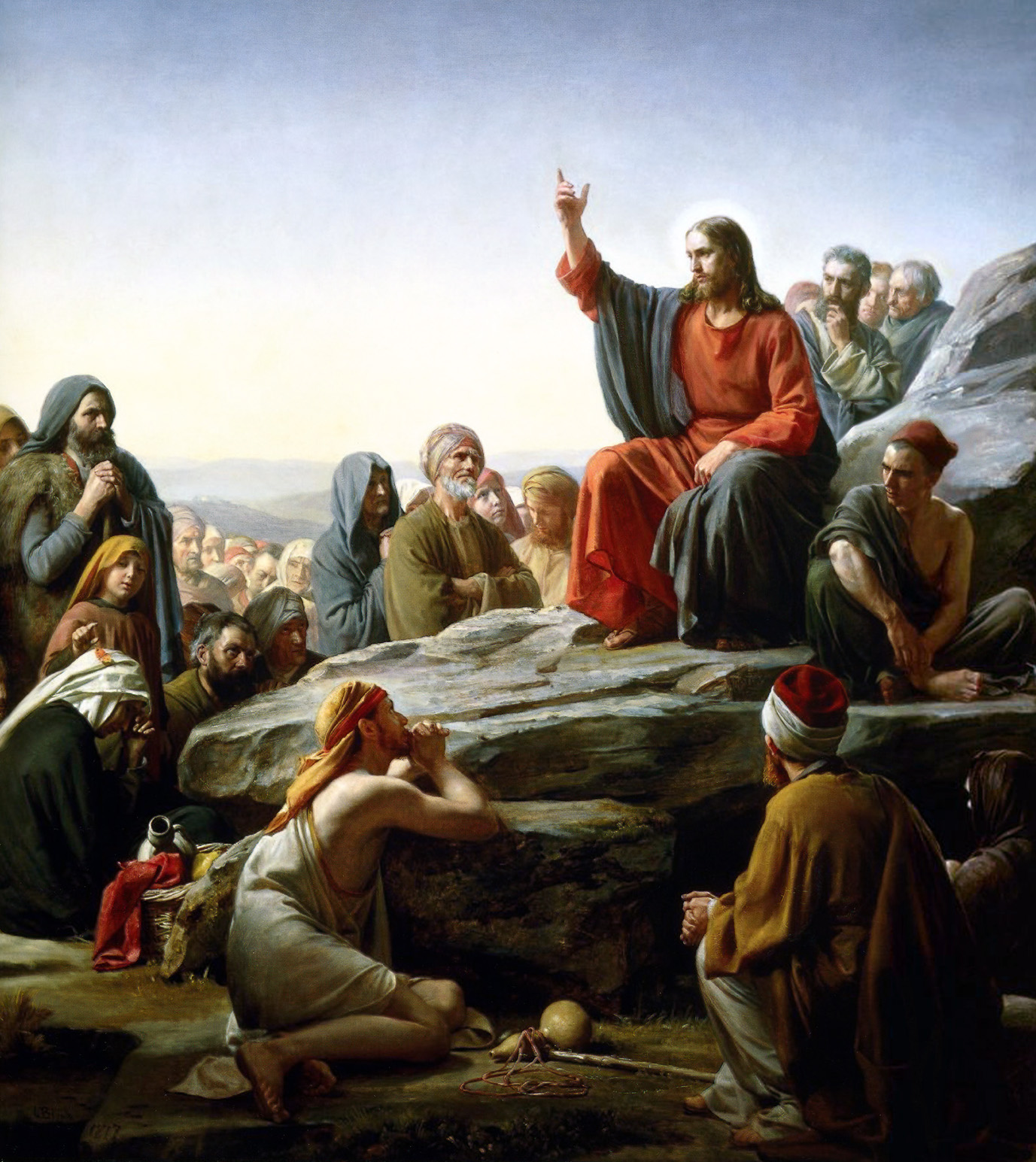
Sermon on the Mount by Carl Bloch

Catholic peace traditions begin with its biblical and classical origins and continue on to the current practice in the twenty-first century. Because of its long history and breadth of geographical and cultural diversity, this Catholic tradition encompasses many strains and influences of both religious and secular peacemaking and many aspects of Christian pacifism, just war and nonviolence.

Catholic tradition as a whole supports and favours peacemaking efforts. Peacemaking is an integral part of Catholic social teaching.

== Definitions ==
The history of peacemaking in the Catholic tradition reflects the religious meanings of peace, tied to positive virtues, such as love, and to the personal and social works of justice. The Greek word for peace is eirene; Roman pax, and in the Hebrew Bible, shalom.

For the earliest Romans, "pax" meant to live in a state of agreement, where discord and war were absent. In his Meditations, or To Himself, the Roman Emperor Marcus Aurelius expresses peace as a state of unperturbed tranquility. The English word "peace" derives ultimately from its root, the Latin "pax".

Shalom (Hebrew: שלום) is the word for peace in the Hebrew Bible (Tanakh or Hebrew: תנ"ך), and has other meanings also pertaining to well being, including use as a greeting.

=== Eirene ===
The Greek meaning for peace, contained in the word eirene, evolved over the course of Greco-Roman civilization from such agricultural meanings as prosperity, fertility, and security of home contained in Hesiod's Works and Days, to more internal meanings of peace formulated by the Stoics, such as Epictetus.

Eirene is the word that the New Testament generally uses for peace, one of the twenty words used by the Septuagint, the Greek version of the Hebrew Bible used in the largely Greek-speaking Jewish communities throughout the Greco-Roman world. It is chiefly through the Septuagint's use of Greek that the Greek word eirene became infused with all the religious imagery and richness of the word shalom in the Hebrew Bible that had evolved over the history of the Jewish people. Subsequently, the use of the Greek Bible as the basis for St. Jerome's Vulgate translation into Latin then brought all the new meanings of eirene to the Latin word pax and transformed it from a term for an imposed order of the sword, the Pax Romana, into the chief image of peace for Western Christianity.

== New Testament ==
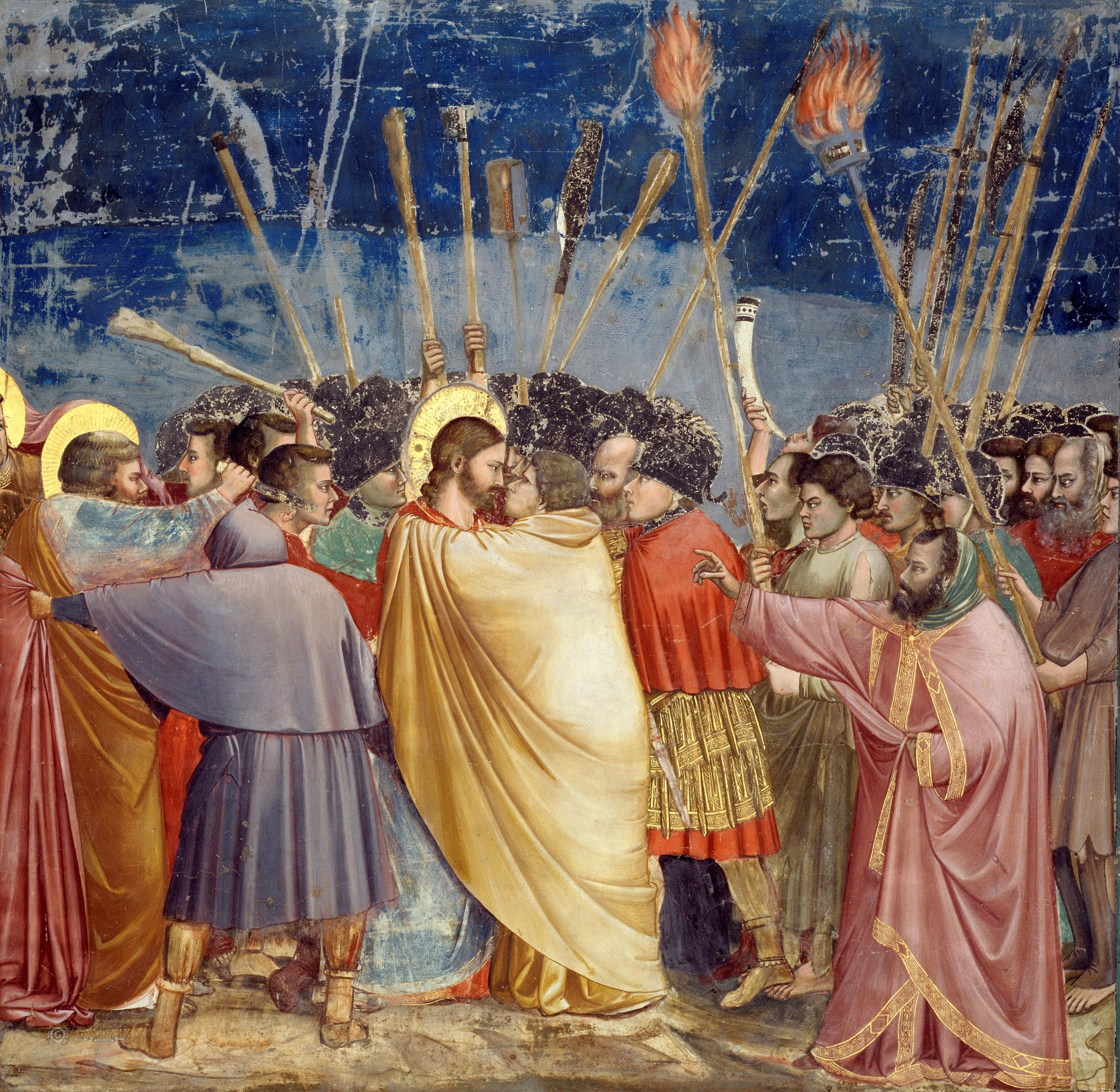
Christ in Gethsemane commands Peter to lay down his sword (fresco by Giotto).

The Gospels present the birth of Jesus as ushering in a new age of peace. In Luke, Zechariah celebrates his son John:

And you, child, will be called prophet of the Most High, for you will go before the Lord to prepare his ways, to give his people knowledge of salvation through the forgiveness of their sins, because of the tender mercy of our God by which the daybreak from on high will visit us to shine on those who sit in darkness and death's shadow, to guide our feet into the path of peace.

And later, the angels appear to the shepherds at Bethlehem, "And suddenly there was a multitude of the heavenly host with the angel, praising God and saying: 'Glory to God in the highest and on earth peace to those on whom his favor rests'" – a peace distinct from the Pax Romana.

The Sermon on the Mount (Mt. 5:1-16) and the Sermon on the Plain (Lk. 6:20-45) combine with the call to "love your enemies" (Mt. 5:38-48) to encapsulate Jesus' teachings on peacemaking. According to Gabriel Moran, the Sermon on the Mount does not advocate submission to oppressors, but rather a strategy to "de-hostilize enemies in order to win them over".

The account of the healing of the centurion's servant suggests to John Eppstein that Jesus did not view military service as sinful, since rather than reprove the soldier for his profession, Jesus praised him for his faith. Nor did Peter require Cornelius to resign his commission or desert upon being baptized. John the Baptist's advice to soldiers was, "Do not practice extortion, do not falsely accuse anyone, and be satisfied with your wages."

== Early Church ==
Early Christianity was relatively pacifist. Clement of Alexandria wrote, "If you enroll as one of God's people, heaven is your country and God your lawgiver. And what are his laws? You shall not kill, You shall love your neighbor as yourself. To him that strikes you on the one cheek, turn to him the other also." (Protrepticus 10)

The early Christians anticipated the eminent return of the Lord in glory, even to the extent that Paul had to tell some of them to get back to work. Generally they were not deeply involved in the larger community. As it became apparent that a more nuanced understanding was called for, Christians came to realize that if they were to survive socially they could not remain within the confines of their own community.

=== Christians in the Roman Army ===
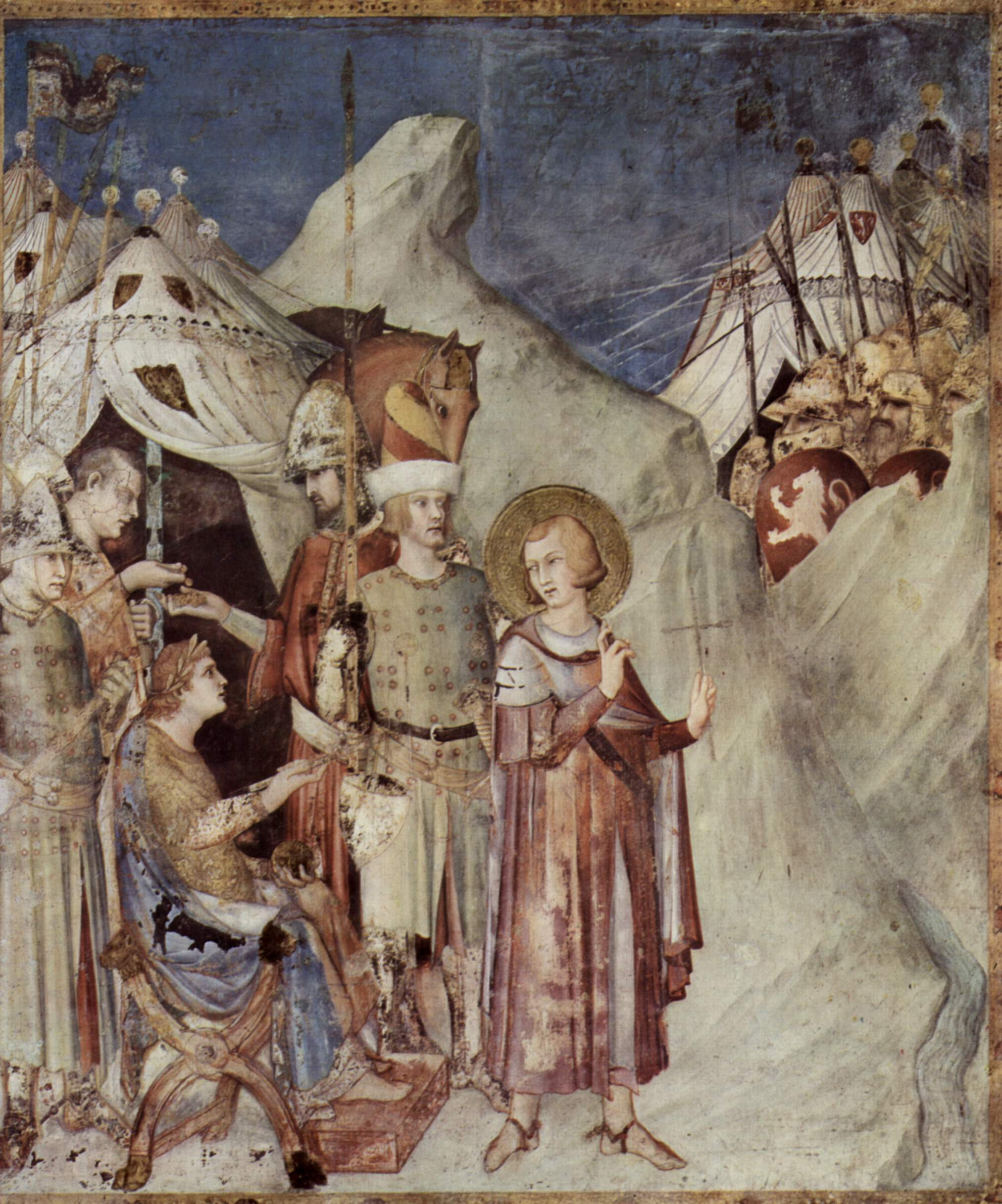
St Martin leaves the life of chivalry and renounces the army (fresco by Simone Martini).

St. Paul wrote, "Let every person be subordinate to the higher authorities, for there is no authority except from God, and those that exist have been established by God. ... This is why you also pay taxes, for the authorities are ministers of God, devoting themselves to this very thing. Pay to all their dues, taxes to whom taxes are due, toll to whom toll is due, respect to whom respect is due, honor to whom honor is due."

The early Christian church believed that Christians should not take up arms in any war, and so struggled attempting to balance the obligation to be a good citizen and the question of whether it was permissible to take up arms to defend one's country. There developed a gap between the reasoning of the moral theorists and the practice of the private citizen.

As early as second century, Christians began to participate in Roman military, police, and government in large numbers. Military service was one way available to make a living, and on the borders of the empire there was a need to defend against barbarian incursions. As the army came to take on duties more in the line of police work: traffic and customs control, firefighting, the apprehension of criminals and bandits, maintaining the peace, quelling street brawls, and performing the roles of engineering, clearance, and other works of building for which the Roman army was well known, this choice became less problematic. The numbers of soldiers that came to be counted among the later martyrs indicates that many Christians served in the military, despite their abhorrence of war.

From about the middle of the second century, officers in the Roman army were expected to participate in the Imperial Cult and sacrifice to the emperor. During the reign of Diocletian this obligation was extended to the lower ranks, as a test for those suspected of being Christian. Christians were therefore counseled not to enlist so as to avoid needless blood guilt and the risk of idolatry, but should nonetheless continue to pray for the civil authorities.

Among the better-known soldier saints are Saint Marinus, Marcellus of Tangier, and Maximilian of Tebessa, and Martin of Tours.

=== Martyrdom as non-violent protest ===
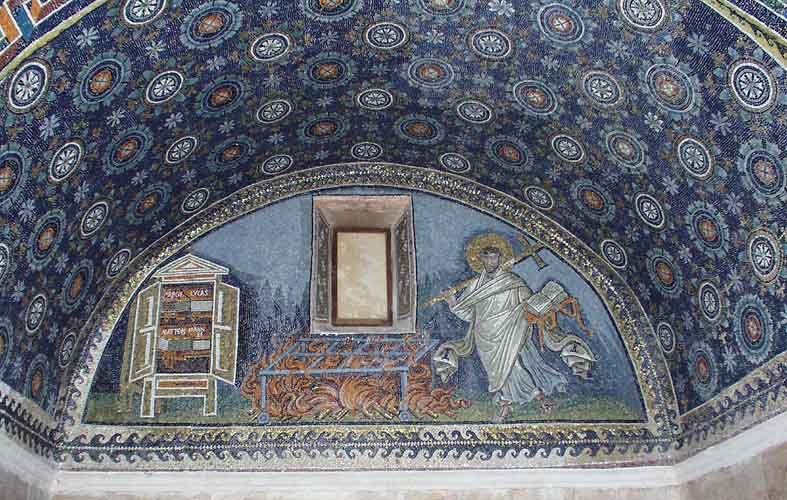
St. Lawrence. Mosaic from the Mausoleum of Galla Placidia, Ravenna, Italy

Persecutions were sporadic and in the third century, largely local. By and large the Roman government didn't pay much attention to Christianity.

Christians sought to live the injunction to love their enemies while resisting their evil, even if this involved persecution and death: these were the martyrs. The word martyr is the Greek for "witness". The early martyrs followed a long-standing tradition; John the Baptist was beheaded for "speaking truth to power". They also had as examples St. Stephen, the apostles James, Philip, and Matthew, and others. According to Josephine Laffin, martyrdom demonstrated to all that Christ had overcome death, and that the Holy Spirit sustained the Church in its fight against darkness and evil.

==== Martyrs of Cordoba ====
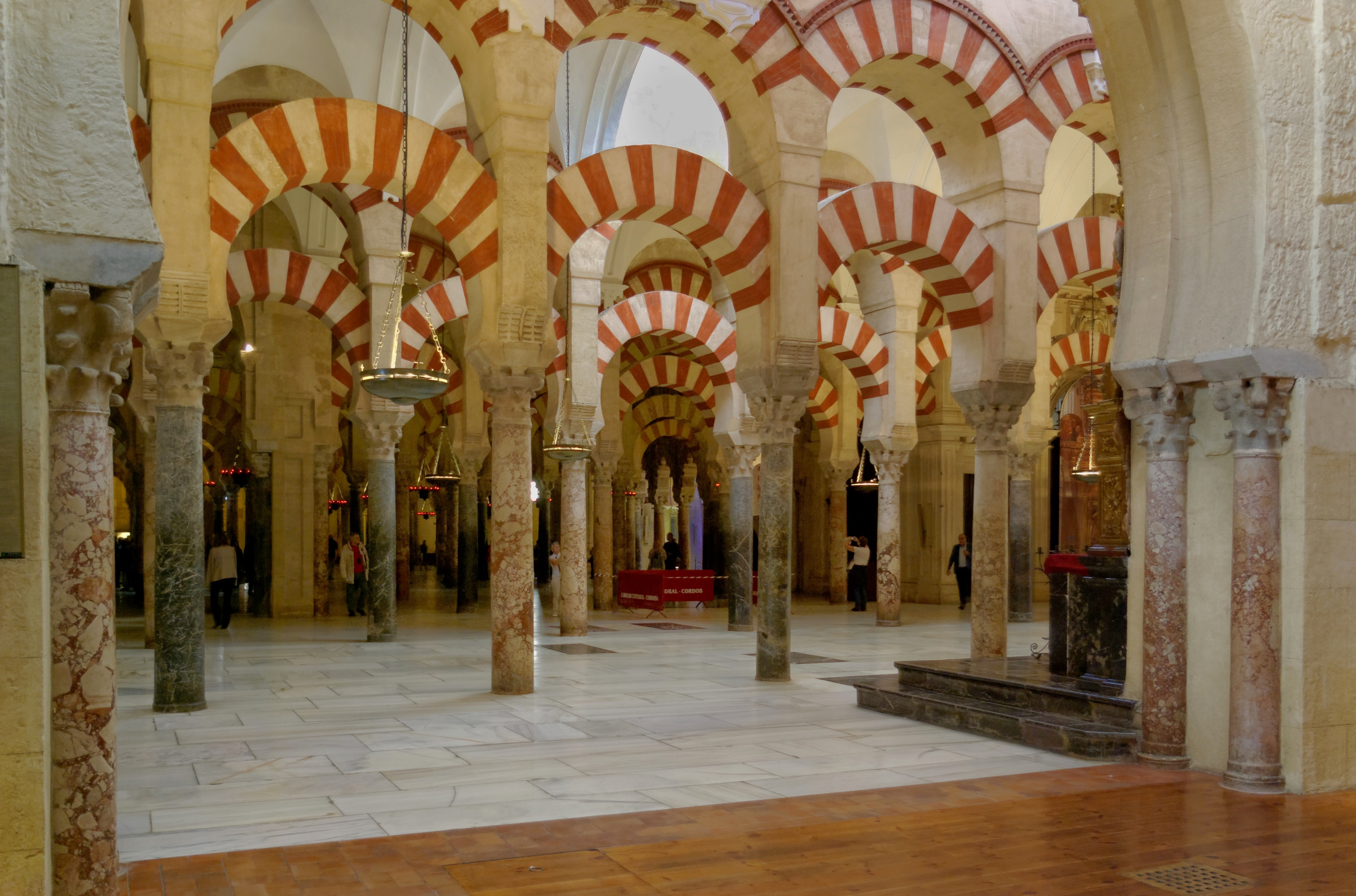
The Mosque in Cordoba. Photo:Timor Espallargas

The Martyrs of Córdoba were forty-eight Christian martyrs living in the ninth-century Muslim-ruled Al-Andalus. Their hagiography describes in detail their executions for deliberately sought capital violations of Muslim law in Al-Andalus. The martyrdoms recorded by Eulogius took place between 851 and 859; with few exceptions, the Christians invited execution by making public statements tactically chosen to invite martyrdom by appearing before the Muslim authorities to denounce Islam. The martyrs caused tension not only between Muslims and Christians, but within the Christian community. In December 852 Church leaders called a council in Cordoba, which honored those fallen but called on Christians to refrain from seeking martyrdom.

Recent historical interpretation of the martyr movement reflect questions on its nature. Kenneth Baxter Wolf sees its cause in "spiritual anxiety" and the penitential aspect of ninth-century Iberian Christianity. Clayton J. Drees sees their motives in a "pathological death-wish, the product of unexpressed hatred toward society that had turned inward against themselves" and other innate "psychological imbalances". Jessica A. Coope suggests that it reflects a protest against the process of assimilation, and that the martyrs demonstrated a determination to assert Christian identity.

=== Age of Constantine ===
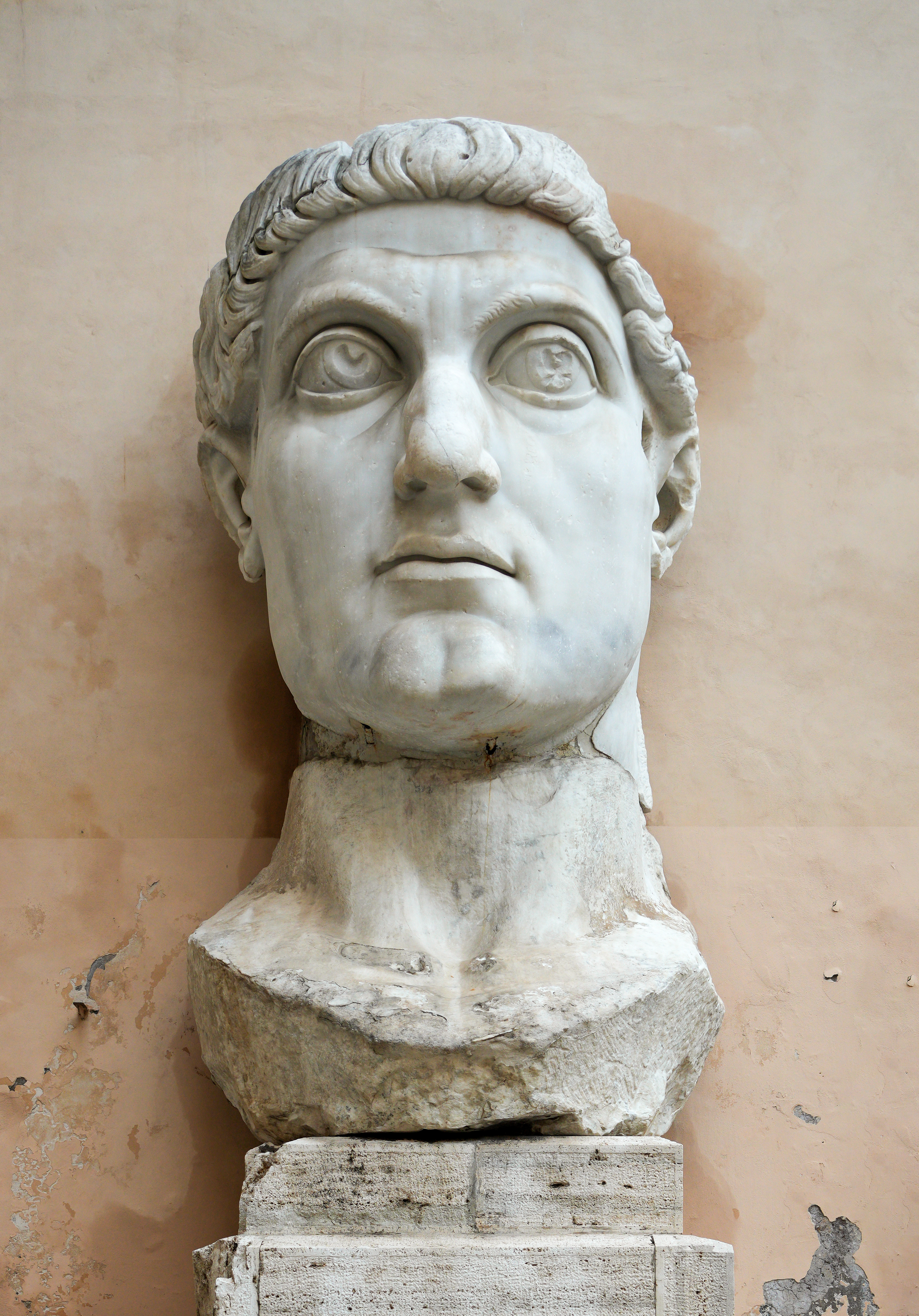
Bust of Constantine (Rome, Capitoline Museum)

With the triumph of Constantine as sole Roman emperor in 313, the church of the martyrs now found itself an accepted and favored religion, soon to become the official religion of the state. Constantine had an emblem inscribed on the shields of his soldiers that has been various described as representing the "Unconquerable Sun" or as a Chi-Rho. Eileen Egan quotes Burkhardt's observation that this was "an emblem which every man could interpret as he pleased, but which the Christians would refer to themselves."

As the religion of the empire, its survival was tied to the fate of the Empire. The threat of increased barbarian incursions therefore threatened both, and defense of the Empire was appropriate in order to protect Christianity. The early trend toward pacifism became muted.

Ambrose of Milan, former Pretorian Prefect of northern Italy before being elected bishop of Milan, preserved the Christian presumption against the use of violence, unless it was needed to protect important social values. While rejecting resorting to violence in self-defense, he argued that charity demanded one protect one's neighbour. "He who does not ward off injury from his comrade, when he is able to, is just as guilty as he who does the injury."

When the Empress Justina sought to have the new basilica in Milan turned over to the Arians, Ambrose, supported by the faithful, occupied it himself in what Egan identifies as an example of non-violent resistance.

=== Augustine of Hippo ===
Following Ambrose, Augustine thought that the Christian, in imitation of Jesus, should not use violence to defend himself, but however, had an obligation to aid a victim under attack.

Augustine of Hippo agreed strongly with the conventional wisdom of his time, that Christians should be pacifists philosophically, but that they should use defense as a means of preserving peace in the long run. He routinely argued that pacifism did not prevent the defence of innocents. In essence, the pursuit of peace might require fighting to preserve it in the long-term. Such a war must not be preemptive, but defensive, to restore peace.

Augustine drew on Roman tradition to view a "just war" as one prosecuted under lawful authority for a just cause, i.e., repelling aggression or injury, retaking something wrongly seized, or to punish wrongdoing. Later other theorists expanded on this. War must be the last resort, have a reasonable chance of success, and produce more good than harm. The church also argued that non-combatants must be protected.

Augustine drew no distinction between offensive and defensive wars, since remedying injuries was a just cause apart from defence. Against the threat of chaos and breakdown of civil order, a man may wage war justly but lament his unavoidable duty.

=== Barbarian Invasions ===
During Augustine's last days Vandals invaded North Africa. Barbarian incursions which later swept Europe in succeeding centuries resulted in a collapse of learning and culture, and population decline. There is a long historical tradition that has collected ample evidence to show that the Roman Empire itself was undergoing profound social, economic, and spiritual changes that were only hastened by the invasions. As the Western Empire crumbled the Church became the stabilizing force for order and peace.

The Christian peacemakers of this period were not the dominant cultural or political force of their time, but were either marginalized minorities — as in the case of the Roman Empire or — as in the case of the missionaries who evangelized the barbarians — were actually reaching out from an oppressive and collapsing world to an anarchic one that offered the seeds of a new society. Among the more important figures of active peacemaking or of intellectual life worth further study were Martin of Tours, Salvian of Marseilles, Nicetas of Remesiana, Germanus of Auxerre, Severinus of Noricum, St. Patrick, St. Genevieve of Paris, Columban, and St. Boniface of Crediton.

== Monasticism ==
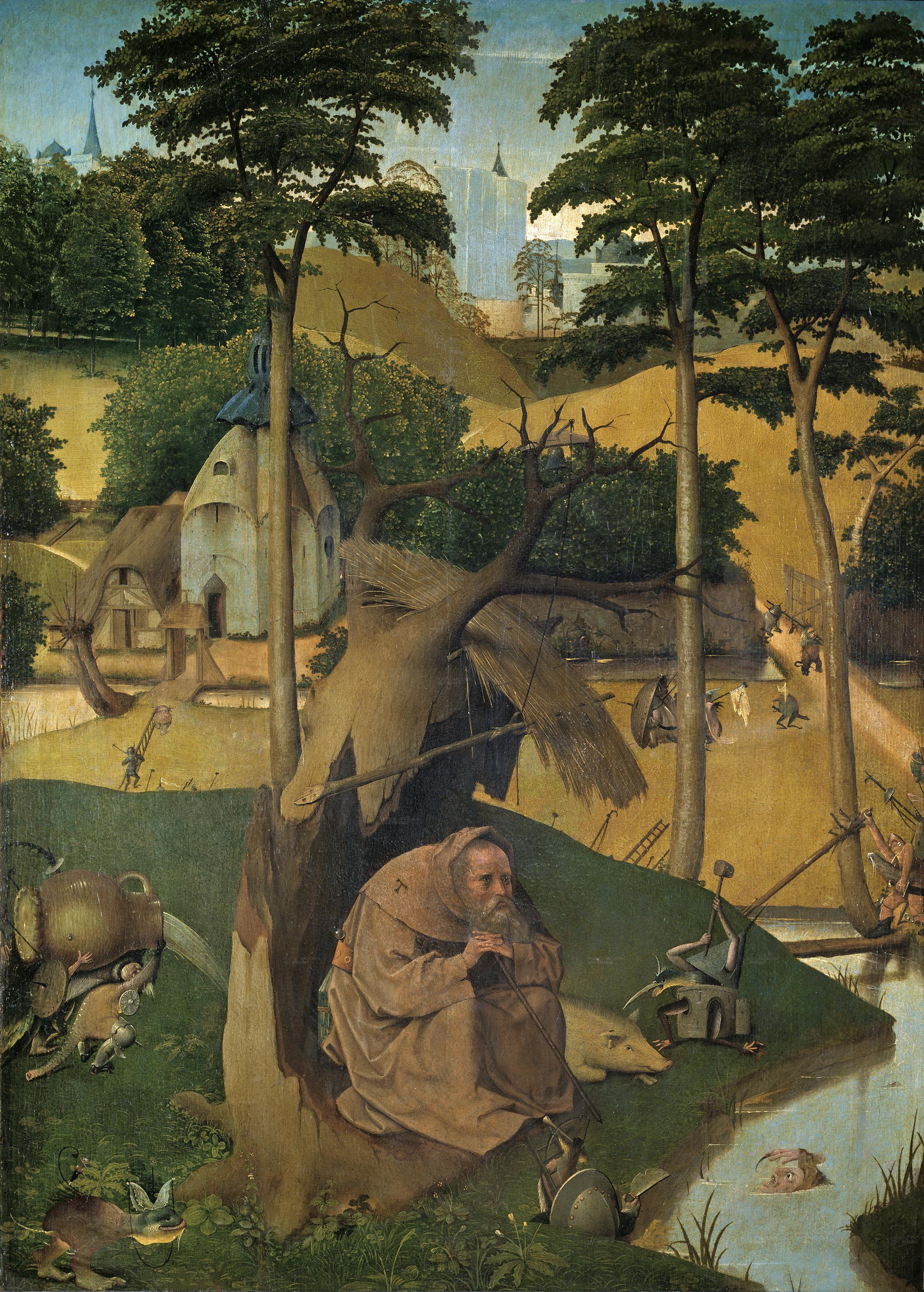
Hieronymous Bosch, Temptation of St. Anthony. Madrid, Prado Museum

It is no coincidence that the appearance of the first monks comes within a few years of Constantine's assumption of power and the alliance of church and empire that he forged. Thomas Merton identified one of the reasons individuals sought out the desert was that they "declined to be ruled by men, but had no desire to rule over others themselves'. Others sought to imitate Jesus' own time spent in the desert.

Monasticism was, in a sense, a continuation of martyrdom, reaffirming the contradiction between the Church and the world, by fleeing from the corruption of civilization in order to seek a greater treasure.

Christian monasticism started in Egypt, then spread to Palestine, Syria, Mesopotamia, and finally to Italy and southern Gaul. Anthony the Hermit (c. 251-356), the founder of monasticism, and Pachomius (c. 290-346) were the prototypes.

=== Penitentials ===
The penitentials, written by Irish monks, were a series of manuals designed for priests who heard confessions that specified certain penances for certain categories of sins. These "penitentials" borrowed inspiration and specific regulations from the early church councils, monastic rules, and the letters of popes and bishops. Many of the regulations at first paralleled those aimed at insuring the special status of the clergy, including its nonviolence, but were gradually extended to the lay population. Penances ranged from fasting on bread and water for week, paying compensation to victims in money, goods or property, exile, pilgrimage, and excommunication. Readmission to Christian community was possible only after the completion of the prescribed penance.

These manuals conceptualized and standardized notions of sin and repentance to the point that they spread from Ireland to the Continent in a variety of collections that became enshrined in official collections of church law by the twelfth century. The penitentials are of value for studying early medieval notions of violence, its seriousness and its consequences in a variety of actions, circumstances, and classes of victims.

The texts assign penances for killing in wartime, even under the lawful command of legitimate authority. Penances lasting from forty days to a year for killing someone in battle, were not uncommon. Following Augustine, war was seen as inherently sinful, and at best the lesser of two evils.

== The Middle Ages ==
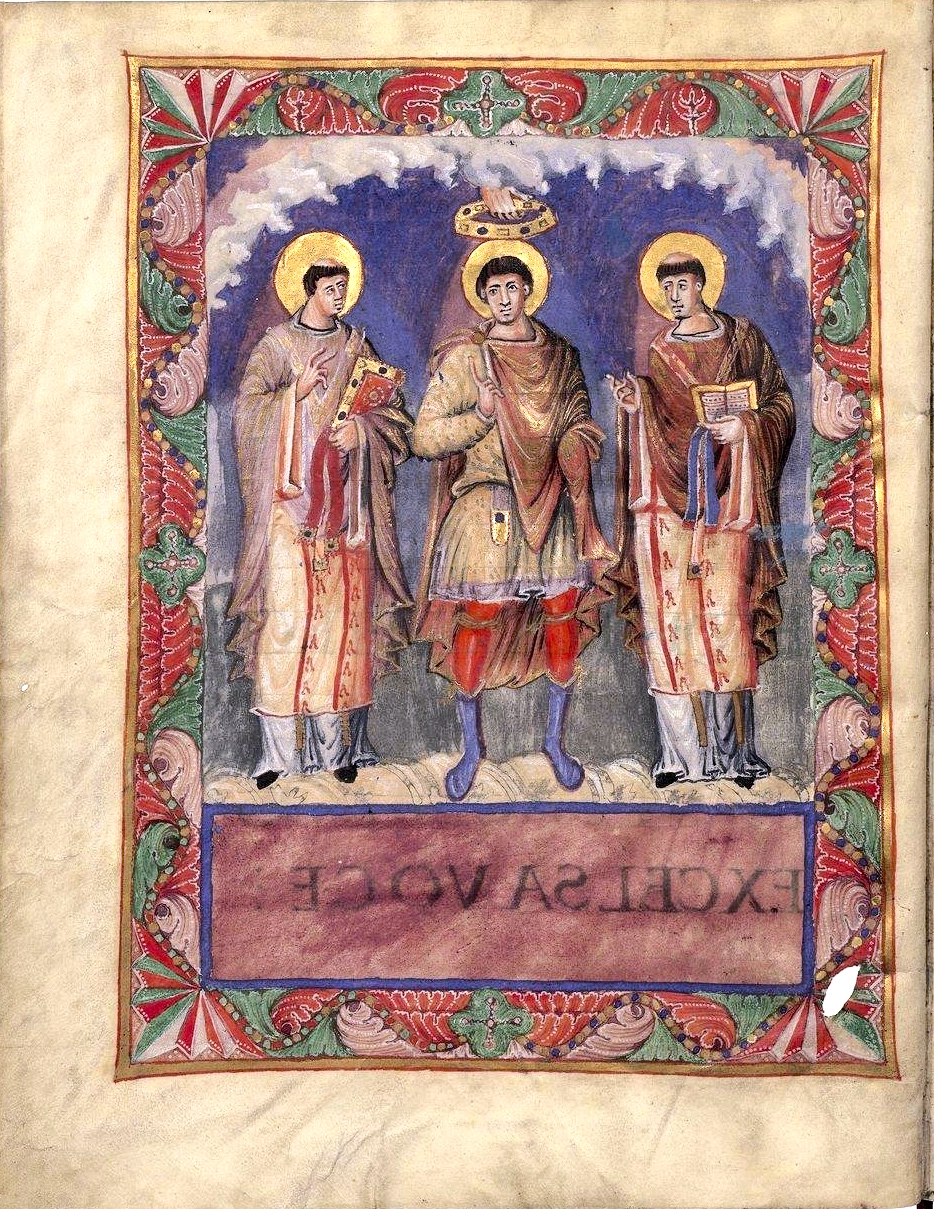
Charles the Bald with Popes Gelasius I and Gregory I. From the Sacramentary of Charles the Bald (c. 870)

The Carolingian period saw the emergence of both a renewed Roman Empire of the West and the beginning of fresh barbarian invasions from the north and east and the rise of Islam. Internal efforts to legislate the life of the Christian Republic were therefore matched by its external defense against invasions by the Vikings, Magyars, and Saracens. The problems and conditions were in many ways similar to those of Christian thinkers under the late Roman Empire when the state was identified with Christian society. The Carolingian Empire thus brought a renewed militarization of society that sought to protect Christendom from external threat, while it used the hierarchical bonds of feudal oaths and vassalage to bring the new class of mobile horse warriors, the milities, to some semblance of central authority. War took on a religious dimension as evidenced by liturgical formulae for the blessings of armies and weapons.

The close identification of the Carolingian Empire with the extent of Western Christianity revived the late Roman associations of Christianitas (Christendom) with the orbis Romanus or oikoumene (the Roman world). On the most official levels Christian peace necessitated its defense against the attacks of external enemies.

Christian peace involved the monastic or ascetic peace of a pure heart and life devoted to prayer; the episcopal peace, or pax ecclesiae, of a properly functioning free and unified church; and the social or imperial peace of the world. These often overlapped.

Carolingian theory established two, separate, ecclesiastical and secular spheres of authority within Christian society, one to lead the body and one the spirit. Monastic life was supported, and encouraged; while late Roman prohibitions against clerical participation in the army were repeated again and again. Among the thinkers and writers on issues of peace and peacemaking were Alcuin of York, Smaragdus of Saint-Mihiel, Paschasius Radbertus, and Hincmar of Rheims. In keeping with their time, these offered various interpretations of peace as an inner tranquillity, legal guidelines to war and the curbing of military violence, or the image of peace as an ideal Christian state.

=== The Cain Adomnan ===
The Cáin Adomnáin (Law of Adomnán), also known as the Lex Innocentium (Law of Innocents) was promulgated amongst a gathering of Irish, Dál Riatan and Pictish notables at the Synod of Birr in 697. It is named after its initiator Adomnán of Iona, ninth Abbot of Iona after St. Columba. As a successor of Columba of Iona, Adomnán had sufficient prestige to assemble a conference of ninety-one chieftains and clerics from Ireland, Dál Riata, and Pictland at Birr to promulgate the new law. As well as being the site of a significant monastery, associated with Saint Brendan of Birr, Birr was close to the boundary between the Uí Néill-dominated northern half of Ireland, and the southern half, where the kings of Munster ruled. It therefore represented a neutral ground where the rival kings and clerics of north and south Ireland could meet.

This set of laws was designed, among other things, to guarantee the safety and immunity of various types of non-combatants in warfare. The laws provided sanctions against the killing of children, clerics, clerical students and peasants on clerical lands; against rape, against impugning the chastity of a noblewoman, and prohibited women from having to take part in warfare. Various factors, including Marian devotion in seventh- and eighth-century Ireland, may have contributed to inspire Adomnán to introduce these laws. Many of these things were already crimes, under the Irish Brehon Laws. The law described both the secular fines which criminals must pay, and the ritual curses to which law-breakers were subject.

The indigenous Brehon Laws were committed to parchment about the seventh century, most likely by clerics. Most scholars now believe that the secular laws were not compiled independently of monasteries. Adomnan would have had access to the best legal minds of his generation. Adomnan's Cain combined aspects of the traditional Brehon laws with an ecclesiastical approach. Following Ambrose and Augustine, bystanders who did nothing to prevent a crime were as liable as the perpetrator. "Stewards of the Law" collected the fine and paid it to the victim or next of kin.

Adomnán's initiative appears to be one of the first systematic attempts to lessen the savagery of warfare among Christians. In it he gave local expression, in the context of the Gaelic legal tradition, to a wider Christian movement to restrain violence. It was an early example of international law in that it was to be enforced in Ireland and northern Scotland, for it was the kings of those regions who were in attendance and signed as guarantors of the Law.

=== Peace of God ===
As Carolingian authority began to erode, especially on the outskirts of power, as in southern Gaul, the episcopate took steps to protect their congregations and their holdings against the encroachments of local nobles. The Peace of God originated in the conciliar assemblies of the late Carolingian period. It began in Aquitaine, Burgundy and Languedoc, areas where central authority had most completely fragmented.

A limited Pax Dei was decreed at the Synod of Charroux in 989 and spread to most of Western Europe over the next century, surviving in some form until at least the thirteenth century.

A great crowd of many people (populus) gathered from the Poitou, the Limousin, and neighboring regions. Relics of saints were displayed and venerated. The participation of large, enthusiastic crowds marks it as one of the first popular religious movements of the Middle Ages. In the early phase, the blend of relics and crowds, and enthusiasm stamped the movement with an exceptionally popular character.

The Peace of God or Pax Dei was a proclamation issued by local clergy that decreed immunity from armed violence to noncombatants who could not defend themselves, beginning with the peasants (agricolae) and the clergy. It included the clergy and their possessions; the poor; women; peasants along with their tools, animals, mills, vineyards, and labor; and later pilgrims and merchants: in short, the vast majority of the medieval population who neither bore arms, nor were entitled to bear them. Children and women were added to the early protections. Merchants and their goods were added to the protected groups in a synod of 1033.

The Pax Dei prohibited nobles from invading churches, beating the defenseless, and burning houses. Excommunication would be the punishment for attacking or robbing a church, for robbing peasants or the poor of farm animals and for robbing, striking or seizing a priest or any man of the clergy "who is not bearing arms". Making compensation or reparations could circumvent the anathema of the Church.

After a lull in the first two decades of the eleventh century, the movement spread to the north with the support of king Robert, the Capetian. There, the high nobility sponsored peace assemblies throughout Flanders, Burgundy, Champagne, Normandy, Amienois, and Berry. By 1041 the peace had spread throughout France and had reached Flanders and Italy. From c. 1018 the peace was extended to Catalonia and reached Barcelona, Girona, and Urgel. Assemblies were repeated all over western Europe into the 1060s.

=== Truce of God ===
The Truce of God or Treuga Dei had its origin in Normandy in the city of Caen. It dates from the eleventh century.

While the Truce of God was a temporary suspension of hostilities, as distinct from the Peace of God which was permanent, the jurisdiction of the Truce of God was broader. The Peace of God prohibited fighting on Sundays, and ferial days (feast days on which people were not obliged to work). It was the sanctification of Sunday which gave rise to the Truce of God, for it had always been agreed not to do battle on that day and to suspend disputes in the law-courts.

It confirmed permanent peace for all churches and their grounds, the monks, clerks and chattels; all women, pilgrims, merchants and their servants, cattle and horses; and men at work in the fields. For all others peace was required throughout Advent, the season of Lent, and from the beginning of the Rogation days until eight days after Pentecost. This prohibition was subsequently extended to specific days of the week, viz., Thursday, in memory of the Ascension, Friday, the day of the Passion, and Saturday, the day of the Resurrection (council 1041). By the middle of the twelfth century the number of proscribed days was extended until there was left some eighty days for fighting.

The Truce soon spread from France to Italy and Germany; the oecumenical council of 1179 extended the institution to the whole Church by Canon xxi, "De treugis servandis", which was inserted in the collection of canon law, Decretal of Gregory IX, I, tit., "De treuga et pace". Aquinas challenged the Truce, holding that it was lawful to wage war to safeguard the commonweal on holy days and feast days.

=== Thomas Aquinas ===
In his Summa Theologica, Thomas Aquinas expands Augustine's arguments to define the conditions under which a war could be just:

- War must occur for a good and just purpose rather than the pursuit of wealth or power.
- Just war must be waged by a properly instituted authority such as the state.
- Peace must be a central motive even in the midst of violence.

== The Crusades ==
Religious thinkers and secular writers attempted to incorporate the controls of the Peace and Truce of God into the existing warrior ethic by "Christianizing" it into the Crusades and the cult of chivalry. Beginning in the eleventh century, knighthood developed a religious character. Prospective knights underwent rigorous religious rituals in order to be initiated. An initiate had to fast, confess his sins, was given a symbolic bath, had his hair cut to represent humility, and he spent a night praying, his weapons upon an altar representing the dedication of his weapons to the Church and God. Advancements in metallurgy allowed inscriptions and pictures of holy symbols to be engraved on helmets, swords, shields, and other equipment. The symbols allowed for a physical reminder to knights and military men that God was supporting their efforts, providing protection to those soldiers as well as the assurance of a victory over their enemies.

Louis IX of France is equally famous for his failed crusades and for the settlement of disputes and the maintenance of peace within Christian lands. He issued the first extant ordinance indefinitely prohibiting warfare in France, a text dating from January 1258 that outlawed guerrae omnes as well as arson, and disturbances to carts and to agricolae who work with carts or plows. Those who transgressed this prohibition were to be punished as peace-breakers (fractores pacis) by the king's officer and the bishop-elect of le Puy-en-Velay. Louis IX promulgated this text as a simple royal act on the basis of his authority as king.

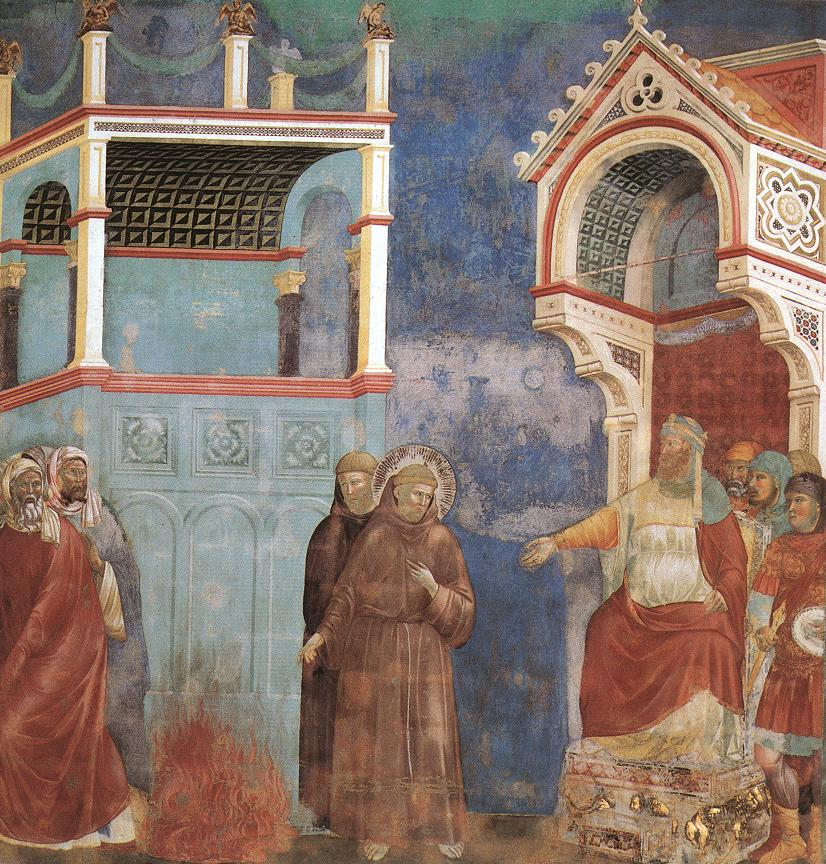
St. Francis before the Sultan - the trial by fire, Giotto

=== Alternatives to the Crusades ===
Christian missionary work was presented as a viable alternative to the violence of the crusaders. Majorcan Franciscan Blessed Ramon Llull (1232-1315) argued that the conversion of Muslims should be achieved through prayer, not through military force, and pressed for the study of Arabic to prepare potential missionaries. He traveled through Europe to meet with popes, kings, and princes, trying to establish special colleges to prepare them.

== Renaissance and Reformation (c. 1400 – c. 1800) ==
=== Humanism ===
==== Erasmus ====
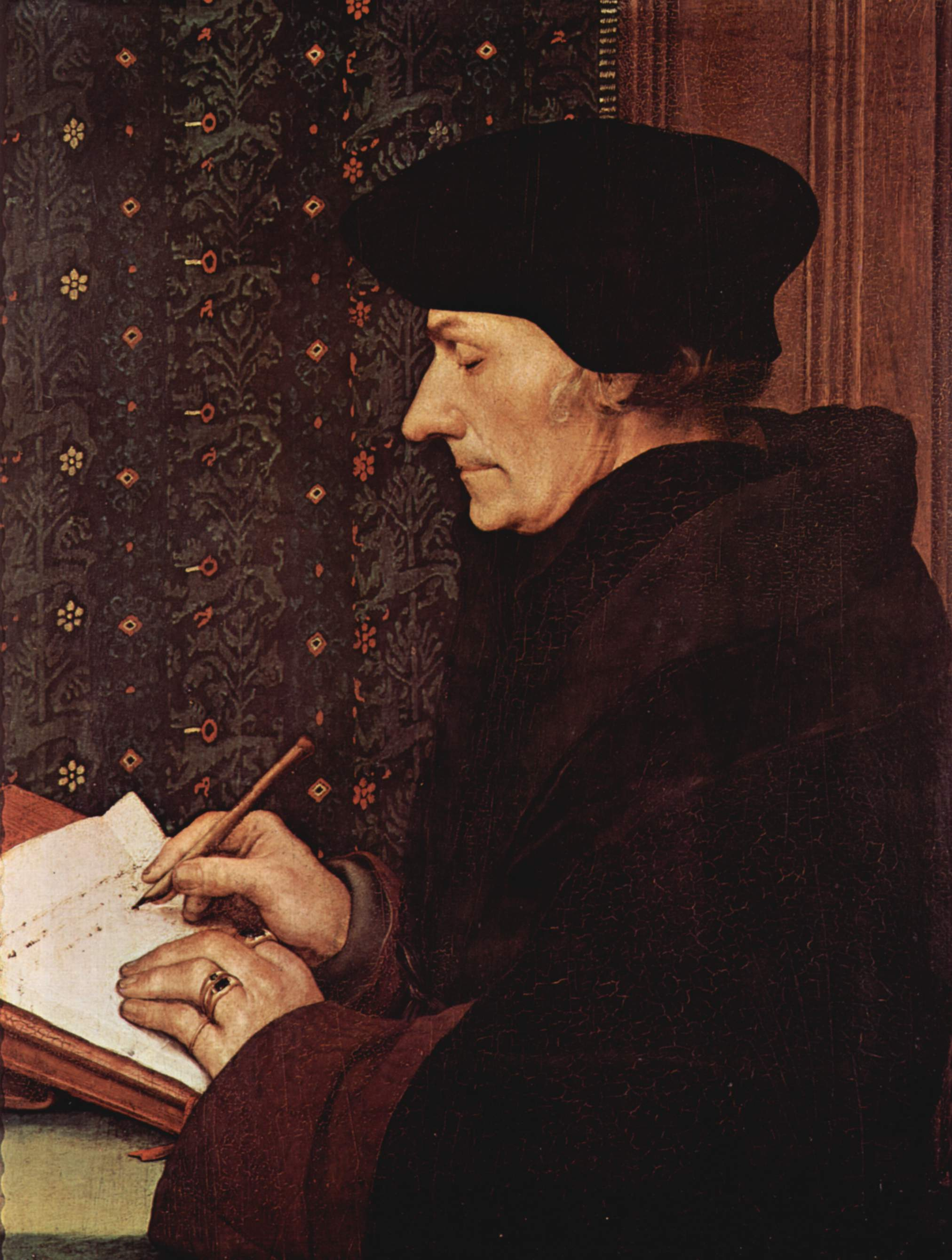
Erasmus by Hans Holbein the Younger

Desiderius Erasmus of Rotterdam was a notable figure of the Northern Renaissance who promoted international peace within Christendom as a moral necessity, both through his books targeted at the educated elite, such as The Complaint of Peace and Education of a Christian Prince, and through his network of high-power correspondents.

He tried to hose down religious antagonism between Catholics and Lutherans. Although Erasmus did not oppose the punishment of heretics, in individual cases he generally argued for moderation and against the death penalty. He wrote, "It is better to cure a sick man than to kill him." However Erasmus warned that aggressive public heresy could provide an excuse for sedition and warfare, and forecast the bloodshed that would be unleashed with the new Lutheranism. He wrote: "When the Lutheran tragedy (Latin: Lutheranae tragoediae) opened, and all the world applauded, I advised my friends to stand aloof. I thought it would end in bloodshed"

=== Age of Exploration ===
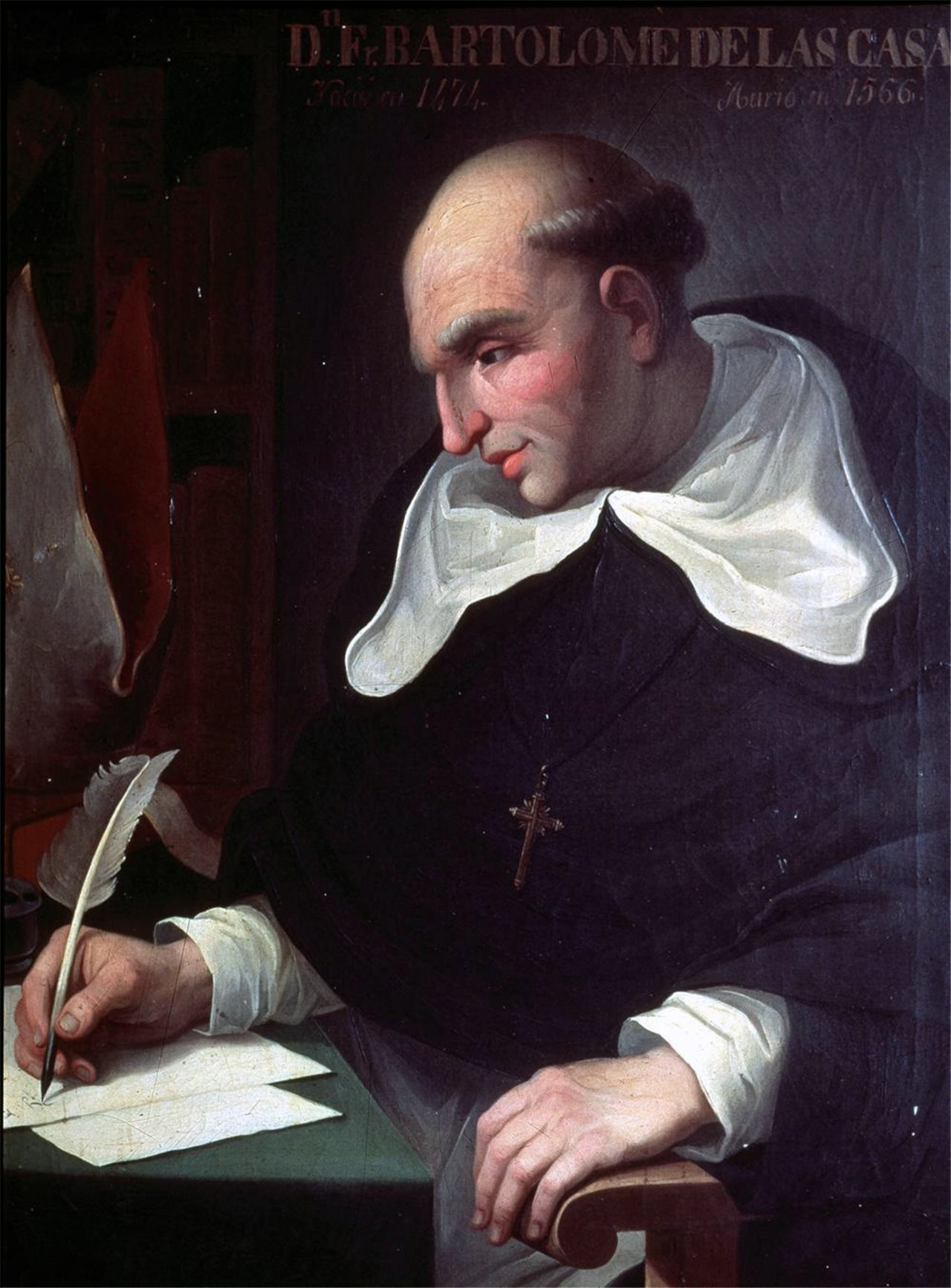
Bartolomé de Las Casas

Francisco de Vitoria was a Spanish Dominican philosopher, considered one of the founders of early international law. He was educated at the College Saint-Jacques in Paris, where he was influenced by the work of Desidarius Erasmus. In 1524, he held the Chair of theology at the University of Salamanca, where a number of missionaries returning from the New World expressed concern regarding treatment of the indigenous inhabitants. In three lectures held between 1537 and 1539 Vitoria concluded that the Indians were rightful owners of their property and that their chiefs validly exercised jurisdiction over their tribes. A supporter of the just war theory, in De iure belli Fransico pointed out that the underlying predicate conditions for a "just war" were "wholly lacking in the Indies". Vitoria adopted from Aquinas the Roman law concept of ius gentium ("the law of nations"). His defense of American Indians was based on a Scholastic understanding of the intrinsic dignity of man, a dignity he found being violated by Spain's policies in the New World.

Dominican friar Pedro de Córdoba OP (c. 1460–1525) was a Spanish missionary on the island of Hispaniola. He was first to denounce the system of forced labor known as the Encomienda, imposed on the native inhabitants.

Other important figures include Bartolomé de Las Casas and Peter of Saint Joseph Betancur

=== Catholic Universalism ===
Émeric Crucé was a French monk who took the position that wars were the result of international misunderstandings and the domination of society by the warrior class, both of which could be reduced through commerce, as that brought people together. The genesis of the idea of a meeting of representatives of different nations to obtain by peaceful arbitration a settlement of differences has been traced to Crucé's 1623 work entitled The New Cyneas, a discourse showing the opportunities and the means for establishing a general peace and liberty of conscience to all the world, addressed to the monarch and the sovereign princes of the time. He proposed that a city, preferably Venice, should be selected where all the Powers had ambassadors including all peoples.

== Modern Church (to c. 1945) ==
=== Kulturkampf ===
From 1871 to 1878, Chancellor Bismarck, who controlled both the German Empire and the Kingdom of Prussia, launched the "Kulturkampf" in Prussia to reduce the power of the Catholic Church in public affairs, and keep Polish Catholics under control. Thousands of priests and bishops were harassed or imprisoned, with large fines and closures of Catholic churches and schools. German was declared to be the only official language, but in practice the Poles only adhered more closely to their traditions. Catholics were angry at his systematic attacks. Unanimous in their resistance, they organized themselves to fight back politically, using their strength in other states such as Catholic Bavaria. There was little or no violence, and the new Roman Catholic Center Party won a quarter of the seats in the Reichstag (Imperial Parliament), and its middle position on most issues allowed it to play a decisive role in the formation of majorities. The culture war gave secularists and socialists an opportunity to attack all religions, an outcome that distressed the Protestants, including Bismarck. After the death of Pope Pius IX in 1878 Bismarck opened negotiations with Pope Leo XIII, which led to his gradual abandonment of the Kulturkampf in the early 1880s.

=== Caritas ===
The first Caritas organisation was established by Lorenz Worthmann 9 November 1897 in Germany. Other national Caritas organisations were soon formed in Switzerland (1901) and the United States (Catholic Charities, 1910). It has since grown into "Caritas Internationalis", a confederation of 165 Roman Catholic relief, development and social service organizations operating in over 200 countries and territories worldwide.

Caritas Australia is involved in peacebuilding and reconciliation programs in Sri Lanka, The Philippines, Papua New Guinea and elsewhere, including Movimento de Defesa do Fevelado (MDF) which trains youth to be peacebuilders in São Paulo, Brazil in response to an increasing number of children becoming involved in drugs, organised crime and murders. It is hoped these trainees will become the next generation of leaders in their communities.

In an effort to overcome many prejudices and fears between different nationalities, ethnic and religious groups. The Salzburg branch of Caritas Osterreich sponsors a Peace Camp for unprivileged children of different religious denominations from all over the Middle East. The camp takes place in a different country in the region each year. Since 1999 almost 900 children and youths from nine different countries and eighteen different religious denominations have participated in the program.

=== Fascism and Nazism ===
Bishop Konrad von Preysing was one of the most firm and consistent of senior Catholics to oppose the Nazis. He and Bishop Clemens August Graf von Galen, along with Cardinal Secretary of State Eugenio Pacelli, were part of a committee that drafted the 1937 encyclical Mit brennender Sorge which warned Catholics that the growing Nazi ideology, which exalted one race over all others, was incompatible with Catholic Christianity.

Austrian Bishop Gfoellner of Linz had the encyclical read from the pulpits of his diocese. Bishop Gfoellner indicated that the dangers of German Catholics were also the dangers of Austrian Catholics: "What I wrote in my pastoral of January 21, 1933. 'It is impossible to be at once a good Catholic and a good National-Socialist,' is confirmed today." The release of Mit brennender Sorge precipitated an intensification of the Nazi persecution of the Catholic Church in Germany. With the death of Cathedral Provost Bernhard Lichtenberg while en route to Dachau, Margarete Sommer took over supervising the work of Preysing's Welfare Office. Sommer coordinated Catholic aid for victims of racial persecution – giving spiritual comfort, food, clothing, and money. She gathered intelligence on the deportations of the Jews, and living conditions in concentration camps, as well as on SS firing squads, writing several reports on these topics from 1942.

Belgian Cardinal Jozef-Ernest van Roey was deeply opposed to Nazi Germany, and once said, "With Germany we step many degrees downward and reach the lowest possible depths. We have a duty of conscience to combat and to strive for the defeat of these dangers ... Reason and good sense both direct us towards confidence, towards resistance". Cardinal van Roey intervened with the authorities to rescue Jews from the Nazis, and encouraged various institutions to aid Jewish children. One of his acts of rescue was to open a geriatric centre in which Jews were housed, at which kosher Jewish cooks would be required who could therefore be given special passes protecting them from deportation. Papal Nuncio Angelo Roncalli used diplomatic couriers, papal representatives and the Sisters of Our Lady of Zion to transport and issue baptismal certificates, immigration certificates and visas – many of them forged – to Hungarian Jews.

Pallottine priest Franz Reinisch was beheaded SAC for refusing to take the oath of allegiance to Hitler. When his offer to serve as a medic was denied, Franciscan tertiary Franz Jaegerstatter was executed as a conscientious objector. Both encountered clergy who thought that they failed in their duty to their country.

== Contemporary Catholicism (c. 1963 – present) ==
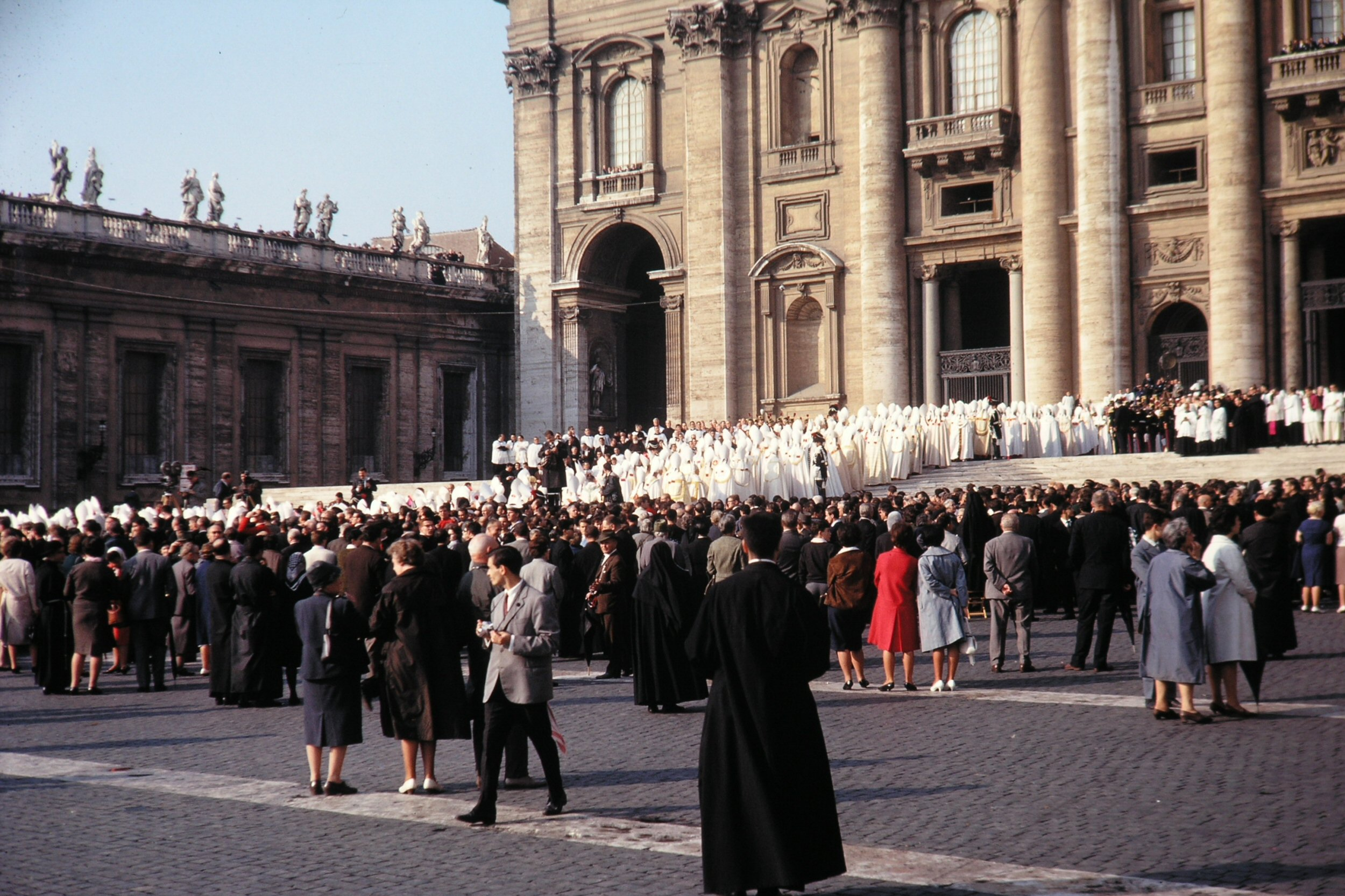
Opening ceremony for Vatican II

=== Europe ===
Pope John XXIII (1958–63) set off a revolution in Roman Catholic thought and life that harkened back to an earlier period for its models and inspiration and brought the church into a new age. Through his policy of aggiornamento the pope opened the church to the modern world. Russell Hittinger describes the encyclical Pacem in Terris "as a kind of magna charta of the Catholic Church's position on human rights and natural law". John's successors Paul VI and John Paul II furthered this agenda while maintaining traditional church teachings in many areas of individual and social morality.

In the 1980s the Polish Solidarity movement grew out of labor strikes in the shipyard at Gdańsk. It was the first non-Communist Party-controlled trade union in a Warsaw Pact country, and became a broad social movement, using civil resistance to advance the causes of workers' rights and social change.

British historian Timothy Garton Ash, observed shortly after Pope John Paul II's death: "without the Polish Pope, no Solidarity revolution in Poland in 1980; without Solidarity, no dramatic change in Soviet policy towards eastern Europe under Gorbachev; without that change, no velvet revolutions in 1989."

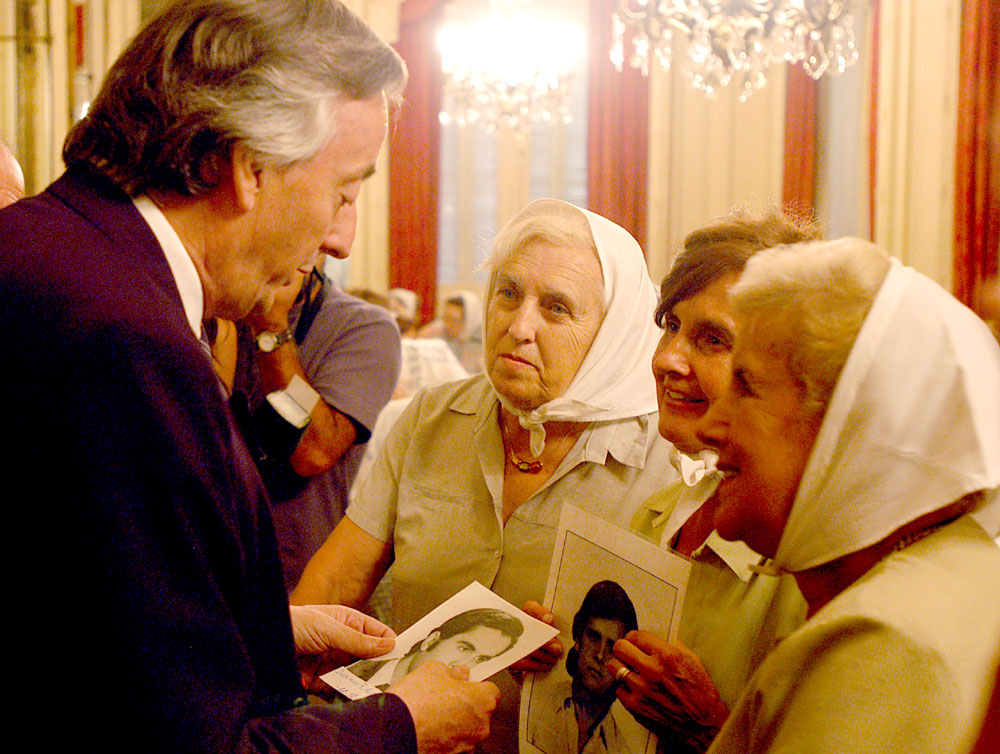
The Mothers of the Plaza de Mayo with Néstor Kirchner, president of Argentina, in 2005

=== Latin America ===
Under the guidance of Archbishop Hélder Câmara, the Catholic church in Brazil became an outspoken critic of the 1964-85 military dictatorship and a powerful movement for social change.

Léonie Duquet and Alice Domon were French religious sisters abducted in December 1977 by an Argentine death squad for their support of the Mothers of the Plaza de Mayo in their efforts to learn the fate of those disappeared by the then ruling military regime. Later that month a number of bodies washed ashore south of Buenos Aires and were subsequently secretly buried. Duquet was among those later disinterred and identified.

In El Salvador, Father Rutilio Grande spoke against the injustices at the hands of an oppressive government, and dedicated his life's work to organizing the impoverished, marginalized rural farmers of El Salvador as they demanded respect for their rights. Father Grande and two others were killed by machine gun fire, while on the way to say Mass.

=== Africa ===
Denis Hurley O.M.I. was the South African Roman Catholic Archbishop of Durban. Hurley was among the first church leaders to denounce apartheid, condemning the policy as an affront to human dignity. In the late 1970s Hurley held a daily silent protest, standing in front of the central Durban Post Office for a period each day with a placard expressing his opposition to apartheid and the displacement of people from their homes. He received many death threats and was at times subject to house arrest. According to Gerald Shaw writing for The Guardian, "It was in part due to his sustained moral crusade and that of other churchmen that the transition to democracy, when it came in 1994, was accepted by white people in peace and good order." Hurley is remembered for his contribution to the struggle against apartheid, his concern for the poor and his commitment towards a more just and peaceful society.

=== Asia ===
Jaime Sin was the Cardinal Archbishop of Manila, who "played a key role in the Philippines' transition to democracy following the lengthy dictatorship of Ferdinand Marcos. The Associated Press called Sin "the Philippines' moral compass". Beyond its effects on the Philippines, the peaceful ouster of Marcos has been cited as a milestone in the movement toward popularly chosen governments throughout the world.

=== United States ===
During World War I, Ben Salmon was a conscientious objector and outspoken critic of Just War theology. The US military charged him with desertion and spreading propaganda, then sentenced him to death, a sentence later commuted to twenty-five years hard labor.

During World War II, Out of a total of 21 million Catholics only 223 claimed IV-E CO status, conscientious objection to military service; 135 were eventually classified. Most Catholic objectors chose I-A-O status, noncombatant military service, generally as unarmed medics on the front lines. In addition to these 135 Catholic conscientious objectors, 61 Catholics refused induction and were imprisoned.

Initially founded as the War Relief Services, the original purpose of Catholic Relief Services was to aid the refugees of war-torn Europe. The continuing support of the American Catholic helped CRS expand operations and in 1955 its name was officially changed to Catholic Relief Services. Over time the agency learned that to supply emergency aid without addressing the underlying problems might prolong conflict by providing new resources to the warring parties. In light of that, CRS has re-evaluated how best to focus their activities. In some countries CRS works on providing peace education for children in refugee camps or improving relations between refugees and local inhabitants. It works in ninety-three countries in programs that address hunger, the provision of clean water, and health issues.

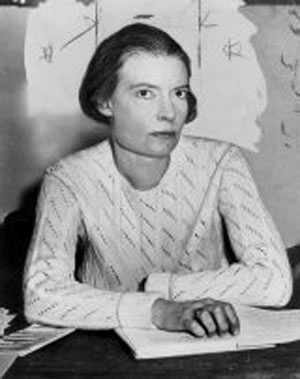
Dorothy Day in 1934

After the war Catholic peacemaking narrowed down to a very few institutions, including the Catholic Worker Movement, and individuals, including Dorothy Day, Ammon Hennacy, and Thomas Merton. After the war, activities were carried on by such individuals as Joseph Fahey and Eileen Egan who were instrumental in the creation of Pax Christi.

== Papal diplomacy and arbitration ==
The institutional church, and especially the papacy, long sought to use its authority to promote peace and justice, and like all human institutions, has met with mixed results. The first was primarily in the area of international diplomacy; the second was the realm of canon law and of theology, in attempts to define the limits of war and violence; and the third, among the Scholastics who investigated the boundaries of individual conscience.

For Medieval Europe, canon law served as a code of international law. According to Garret Mattingly,

since the eleventh century, the canonists had been pre-occupied with many of the problems which we think of as belonging to public international law, with the definition of sovereignty, with the sanctity of treaties, with the preservation of peace, with the rights of neutrals and noncombatants, and with the mitigation of the rigours of war.

In the thirteenth century the Papacy became the first Western power to make a systematic use of diplomacy. The papacy, in fact, can be regarded as the originator of many of the most basic elements of modern diplomacy and international law: the protection and safe conduct of ambassadors, the secrecy of diplomatic negotiations, the insistence that treaties and their terms, once made, are to be strictly adhered to, the condemnation of violations, provisions for the release of prisoners and hostages and their humane treatment while in detention, the protection of exiles, aliens, and racial minorities, and the condemnation of unjust wars all derive from the papal position both as the leader of Christian society and as a force for international unity among secular states.

The papacy's association of peace with justice that motivated its active arbitration in international relations also prompted its interest in another area associated with justice, that of jus or law. In the international sphere this brought the papacy to adopt the ancient Roman theories of the jus gentium, a body of custom and agreements among peoples and sovereign princes, from the tenth century linked with the revival of Roman law in Italy. Closely associated with Roman law and custom was the notion of the just war, which was Christianized by St. Augustine and handed on to the Middle Ages through St. Isidore of Seville.

- Pope Nicholas I (858-67) against the backdrop of Carolingian conquest Nicholas penned what is both a "classic summary of Christian faith and discipline" and a harsh condemnation of war. In his Reply to the Inquiry of the Bulgars, written in 866, Nicholas condemns conversion by force, branding war as a diabolical fraud. Nicholas concedes that war may be permissible in cases of inescapable necessity, but such cases are only deemed to be the "defence of not only yourself but also your country and the laws of your fathers". He advises that deserters (c. 22) and those who refuse to obey orders to kill (c. 23) be treated leniently and gives Boris examples of numerous martyrs who fled in the face of violence. In response to Boris' question as to how Christians are to prepare for war, Nicholas answered that one must employ all the Christian works of mercy that make peace, affirm life, and negate the motives for and works of war.
- During the tenure of Pope Pius IX, Catholics and Protestants collaborated to found a school in Rome to study international law and train international mediators committed to conflict resolution.
- In 1885 Pope Leo XIII was asked by Spain and Germany to mediate their territorial dispute in the South Pacific.
- Pope Benedict XV left a legacy of lasting significance for the papacy and the church in the area of teaching and practice on war and peace. In condemning World War I as a whole without taking sides, the pope did not reason in terms of traditional church teaching about just and unjust wars. He was able to see that modern technology — especially the novelty of aerial bombardment — had made traditional moral calculations and distinctions between combatants and noncombatants increasingly meaningless. Pope Benedict's influence on his successors is clear in Pope Pius XII's attempts to use diplomacy to forestall World War II.
- Pope John XXIII made Vatican diplomatic resources available in 1962 to the United States and Russia, during the Cuban Missile Crisis. Over the course of two days, messages was sent between the White House and the Kremlin, with the Vatican serving as the intermediary. The pope's "decisive intervention", as the Associated Press later described it, helped avert nuclear war, in allowing Krushchev to save face and not look weak by being the reasonable leader who kept the peace by removing the missiles from Cuba.
- Pope John Paul II launched the interreligious prayer for peace gatherings in Assisi in 1986.
- On June 8, 2014 Pope Francis welcoming the Israeli and Palestinian presidents to the Vatican for an evening of peace prayers just weeks after the last round of U.S.-sponsored negotiations collapsed.

== See also ==
- Christian pacifism
- Just war theory
- Nonviolence
- Peace and conflict studies
- Role of Christianity in Western society

== Bibliography ==
- Bainton, Roland H. Christian Attitudes Toward War and Peace. New York: Abingdon, 1960.
- Fahey, Joseph J., War and the Christian Conscience: Where Do You Stand? Maryknoll, NY: Orbis, 2005.
- Flinn, Frank K.; Melton, J. Gordon (2007). "pacifism". Encyclopedia of Catholicism. Infobase Publishing. pp. 491-492. ISBN 978-0-8160-5455-8.
- Klejment, Anne (1996). Roberts, Nancy L. (ed.). American Catholic Pacifism: The Influence of Dorothy Day and the Catholic Worker Movement. Greenwood Publishing Group. ISBN 978-0-275-94784-2.
- McNeal, Patricia F. (1978). The American Catholic Peace Movement, 1928–1972. Classic Quilt Series. Arno Press.
- Merton, Thomas. The Nonviolent Alternative. New York: Farrar, Straus and Giroux, 1980.
- Musto, Ronald G (2010). "Catholic Peace Traditions". In Young, Nigel J. (ed.). The Oxford International Encyclopedia of Peace. Vol. 1. Oxford & New York: Oxford University Press.
- Musto, Ronald G. Liberation Theologies: A Research Guide. New York: Garland, 1991.
- "The New American Bible". Vatican. 11 November 2002.
- O'Brien, David J. and Thomas A. Shannon, eds. Renewing the Earth: Catholic Documents on Peace, Justice and Liberation. Garden City, NY: Doubleday, 1977
- Pagden, Anthony. Vitoria: Political Writings, Cambridge University Press, 1991
- Windley-Daoust, Jerry; Kilmartin, Lorraine; Navarro, Christine Schmertz; Hodapp, Kathleen Crawford; Wilt, Michael (2008). Living Justice and Peace: Catholic Social Teaching in Practice (2nd ed.). Saint Mary's Press. ISBN 978-0-88489-985-3.
- Zahn, Gordon. War, Conscience and Dissent. New York: Hawthorne, 1967.
