= Labor Express Radio =

- Genre: News, Current affairs
- Running time: 1 hour
- Language: English
- Home station: WLPN-LP Lumpen Radio
- Produced by: Chicago Committee For Labor Access
- Original release: 1993 – present
- No. of episodes: 1000+
- Website: http://www.laborexpress.org/

Labor Express Radio is a weekly labor news and current affairs radio program that broadcasts every Monday morning on WLUW, a formerly-independent community radio station in Chicago which recently reverted to its original status as the radio station for Loyola University in Chicago. It is Chicago's only English-language radio program devoted to issues related to the labor movement (Radio Chamba, also on WLUW covers the labor movement in its Spanish-language broadcast) and one of only a few of such programs around the country. Labor Express has covered local, national and international labor news for almost a decade and a half, since its first broadcast in 1993. It is a totally volunteer-produced and self-funded project. The program is a production of the Committee for Labor Access, a 501(c)(3) non-profit organization, which oversees both Labor Express and Labor Beat, a Public-access television labor cable TV program which broadcasts in Chicago and Rockford, Illinois and St. Louis, Missouri. The program is affiliated with IBEW Local 1220 which represents radio and TV broadcast engineers in Chicago, but the views expressed on the show are solely that of its producers.

== WCFL and the history of labor radio in Chicago ==
Chicago has always been a leading center of the labor movement in the United States. The events of the “Haymarket Affair” in 1886 are recognized worldwide as seminal to the modern working class movement. Chicago has more union locals with the number designation 1 (usually meaning the first) than any other city in the country – a testament to the number of national and international unions who owe their early formative history to the city. Likewise, Chicago has long been a pioneer in the field of labor movement communications – especially radio. John Fitzpatrick, President of the Chicago Federation of Labor (CFL) from 1905 until his death in 1946, and Edward Nockels, secretary of the CFL from 1903 until his death in 1937, were labor movement visionaries who recognized the potential that radio offered to communicate the message of organized labor to a mass audience. Their advocacy in favor of a station independent of the influence of “big business”, led to the creation of WCFL, “Chicago’s Voice of Labor”, the first and only labor-owned radio station in the country.

According to historian Nathan Godfried, who wrote a history of WCFL, the station served the trade union movement by devoting considerable time to labor focused programs and was especially useful during periods of labor unrest, such as major strikes, when much of the corporate owned media was far less likely to analyze the situation from a pro-labor perspective... Launched in 1926, the station continued to function under the ownership of the CFL until 1978, with the Federation finding the need to make it a commercial operation in 1930. By the 1960s, the station had turned over almost all of its programming to a Top 40 music format. The CFL made the decision in 1978 that operation of the station was no longer profitable and sold it to the Mutual Broadcasting System, at the time a subsidiary of the infamously anti-Labor Amway Corporation.

From the late 1970s until the early 1990s, Chicago lacked a consistent outlet for labor news. In the early 1990s, communication activists at Loyola University of Chicago and in the surrounding community, led an effort to transform the university's radio station from a dance music format into a station that sought out community oriented programming. One of the first programs to develop from these efforts was Labor Express.

== Wayne Heimbach, Labor Beat TV, and the early years of Labor Express Radio ==
The founding producer of Labor Express Radio, and its host for over 10 years, was Wayne Heimbach, an organizer with Service Employees International Union (SEIU) Local 73 at the time. Heimbach, much like his predecessors who founded WCFL, recognized the importance of developing forms of labor movement mass communication. Heimbach had already been active in supporting the work of the Committee for Labor Access, the organization responsible for producing the Labor Beat TV program, a weekly Public-access television show in Chicago that also covers issues related to the working class movement in Chicago and on the national scene. When WLUW expressed its interest in broadcasting locally produced, community-focused programming, Heimbach seized the opportunity to launch the first labor oriented radio news program in the city in nearly 20 years.

WLUW currently broadcasts Labor Express once a week, in a one-hour time slot at 10 AM on Monday mornings. The early focus of Labor Express was the local struggles of the labor movement in Chicago and the Midwestern United States. Some of the stories covered in the program's early years included renewed efforts at organizing service sector workers in Chicago by SEIU (Service Employees International Union), Heimbach's own union, and the Chicago Staley Workers Solidarity Committee, which formed to support the locked out workers at A. E. Staley, a corn sweetener processing plant in Decatur Illinois. But the program was not solely restricted to issues of local concern. Many national and international issues of concern to working people were also addressed, such as the election of a reform slate led by John Sweeney to the leadership of the AFL-CIO in 1994, and efforts of trade unionists in the United States to form links of solidarity with South African unions fighting the Apartheid regime. The program also featured segments on working class culture and songs of the labor movement by artist like the Chicago-based folk musician Bucky Halker.

== WLUW becomes an independent community radio station ==
Throughout the late 1990s, WLUW moved further in the direction of a community oriented radio station. Financial difficulties facing Loyola University led the institution to consider ceasing the radio station's operations in 2002. The efforts of WLUW producers and community activists led to an agreement under which station management would be taken over by WBEZ, the National Public Radio affiliate in Chicago. WBEZ's mission was to assist station managers develop a plan to make the station self-funding and self-supporting within five years. WLUW from that point on began referring to itself as Chicago's independent, listener-supported, community radio station. The radio station attracted growing attention, even at a national level, for its unique programming format and its devotion to remaining community controlled and funded. The station continued to expand its offerings of community programs devoting air time to a diversity of ethnic groups, including foreign-language programs for the Haitian, Latino, Ethiopian, and Southeast Asian communities in Chicago. The program lineup includes many progressive public affairs programs produced by local organizations. The Heartland Cafe, a restaurant that also acts as a left wing activist center in Chicago's Rogers Park neighborhood, hosts Live From the Heartland. The staff of the 8th Day Center for Justice, a Catholic social justice organization, produces a program called The 8th Day devoted to peace and justice issues. Chicago's Independent Media Center produces From The Trenches, a politically progressive local news program. Labor Express, and in more recent years Radio Chamba, provides the station programming focused on issues of concern to Chicago's working class communities.

In the summer of 2007 Loyola University, which still owns the WLUW license and the property from which 88.7 FM is broadcast, decided it wanted WLUW to once again become a University radio station, incorporated into the University's Communications Department. The decision raised concern among many involved with the station that the community oriented programming would be dropped. Shortly following the University's announcement of its plans to resume management of the station, the station manager and program manager were replaced, creating even deeper suspicions about the future of the station's programming. When the transfer of management became official in the summer of 2008, dozens of station staff left the station, mostly those involved in music programming. So far, the community programming at WLUW has not changed and the new station management has indicated that no major programming changes will be coming for the foreseeable future.

== Jerry Mead-Lucero takes over as host/producer ==
In February 2004, Wayne Heimbach decided to retire as the host/producer of Labor Express. His replacement was Jerry Mead-Lucero, a long time Chicago labor activist. Mead-Lucero is a member of the National Writers Union (NWU, UAW Local 1981) and the Industrial Workers of the World (IWW). He had worked for a short period as an organizer with SEIU Local 880 and has been active with Jobs with Justice, a labor/community coalition, since the mid-1990s, including a few years as the chair of the organization's Global Justice Committee. Besides labor activism, Mead-Lucero has worked extensively in the Latin American solidarity movement since the late 1980s and in the immigrants rights movement since the mid-1990s. Since 2000, he has been active in both anti-gentrification and environmental justice struggles in the Pilsen neighborhood, a working class, Mexican immigrant neighborhood on Chicago's south side. Despite his lack of experience in radio broadcasting, Mead-Lucero agreed to take over as host of the program when Heimbach's departure threatened to end the program's existence.

During Mead-Lucero's tenure as host/producer, Labor Express has sought to continue Heimbach's legacy of covering important developments in the Labor movement locally, nationally and globally. Some of the more important issues addressed by the program in recent years include the 2005 split in the AFL-CIO, the race and class dimensions of the Hurricane Katrina disaster, the Congress Hotel strike, labor opposition to the war in Iraq, the struggle for a living wage ordinance in Chicago, labor struggles in Latin America, the growth of the immigrants rights movement, Renaissance 2010 (a plan to privatize 10% of Chicago's public schools), the CFL's involvement in the 2006 municipal elections in Chicago, concessionary contracts by the UAW (United Auto Workers union), multiple victories by the CIW (Coalition of Immokalee Workers), the financial and economic crisis which began in the fall of 2008, labor's involvement in the 2008 Presidential elections, and the occupation of Republic Windows and Doors by its workers, members of UE Local 1110, in December 2008.

Labor Express has also sought to maintain Heimbach's interest in working class culture and music. Mead-Lucero has added to the repertoire of labor folk songs working class music from many genres, including punk, Latin, and hip-hop. Mead-Lucero has had assistance with hosting and production at times from assistant producer Marnie Goodfriend, a former staff member of SEIU Local 880 and Stacie Johnson, a former intern with WBEZ.

== Sources and links ==
- Labor Express Radio’s homepage
- Labor Express Radio’s program archive at Archive.org
- Website for radio station WLUW which broadcast a live web stream of the program http://www.wluw.org/
- Website for the Labor Beat TV program https://web.archive.org/web/20080827161054/http://www.laborbeat.org/lb/home.htm
- More Information on Labor Beat TV http://www.allacademic.com/meta/p_mla_apa_research_citation/2/6/0/4/4/p260440_index.html
- Article on both Labor Express and Labor Beat in the 2001 edition of John Downing’s book Radical Media
- Both Labor Express and Labor Beat are members of UPPNET (Union Producers and Programmers Network) https://web.archive.org/web/20070627044709/http://www.uppnet.org/index.htm

More information on WCFL

- https://web.archive.org/web/20100617042124/http://www.radiotimeline.com/am1000wcfl.htm
- https://web.archive.org/web/20090429093016/http://users.crocker.com/~acacia/text_radio.html
- http://www.encyclopedia.chicagohistory.org/pages/1331.html
