= Catholic social activism in the United States =

Catholic social activism in the United States is the practical application of the notions of Catholic social teaching into American public life. Its roots can be traced to the 19th century encyclical Rerum novarum of Pope Leo XIII.

== Labor union movement ==
The Catholic Church exercised a prominent role in shaping America's labor movement. From the onset of significant immigration in the 1840s, the Church in the United States was predominantly urban, with both its leaders and congregants usually of the laboring classes. Over the course of the second half of the nineteenth century, nativism, anti-Catholicism, and anti-unionism coalesced in Republican politics, and Catholics gravitated toward unions and the Democratic Party.

The Knights of Labor was the earliest labor organization in the United States, and in the 1880s, it was the largest labor union in the United States. and it is estimated that at least half its membership was Catholic (including Terence Powderly, its president from 1881 onward).

== Effects of Rerum novarum ==
This was the context in which Pope Leo XIII wrote an encyclical letter that articulated the teaching of the Church with a view to the “new things” of the modern world. In Rerum novarum (1891), Leo criticized the concentration of wealth and power, spoke out against the abuses that workers faced and demanded that workers should be granted certain rights and safety regulations.

He upheld the right of voluntary association, specifically commending labor unions. At the same time, he reiterated the Church’s defense of private property, condemned socialism, and emphasized the need for Catholics to form and join unions that were not compromised by secular and revolutionary ideologies.

Rerum novarum provided new impetus for Catholics to become active in the labor movement, even if its exhortation to form specifically Catholic labor unions was widely interpreted as irrelevant to the pluralist context of the United States. While atheism underpinned many European unions and stimulated Catholic unionists to form separate labor federations, the religious neutrality of unions in the U.S. provided no such impetus. American Catholics seldom dominated unions, but they exerted influence across organized labor. Catholic union members and leaders played important roles in steering American unions away from socialism.

Fr. Edward McGlynn's work first in St. Stephen's Parish in New York and his later alliance and support of and activity with Henry George and the land value taxation for social justice movement.

The onset of industrial organizing in the 1930s, particularly with the founding of the Congress of Industrial Organizations (CIO) led to a renewed activism by Catholics in the labor movement. Catholics such as Phillip Murray and Jim Carey led CIO unions. Over one hundred "Catholic Labor Schools" were founded by the Catholic Church to teach workers both Catholic social principles and the "meat and potatoes" of union organizing, contract negotiation, grievance handling, and union administration. The most famous of these schools are the Boston Labor Guild and New York's Xavier Labor School.

The Catholic Church's teaching in support of labor unions is not just something of the past. The Church teaches that in today's situation, unions are an indispensable part of a just social order.

== German Catholic Central-Verein ==
The German Catholic Central-Verein was founded in 1855 as a federation of parish mutual aid societies. Although the German Catholic community had a strong reputation for conservatism, by 1900 it took the lead as the most reform-oriented of American Catholic societies under the leadership of Nicholas Gonner of Milwaukee (189-1903) and Frederick P. Kenkel (1908-1952). Today its main role is to publish the Social Justice Review, a journal which was founded in 1908 to promote Christian humanism with respect for the dignity and rights of all human beings.

== Bishops' Program of Social Reconstruction ==
On February 12, 1919, the National Catholic War Council issued the "Bishops' Program of Social Reconstruction," through a carefully planned public relations campaign. The plan offered a guide for overhauling America's politics, society, and economy based on Pope Leo XIII's Rerum novarum and a variety of American influences.

The Program received a mixed reception both within the Church and outside it. The National Catholic War Council was a voluntary organization with no canonical status. Its ability to speak authoritatively was thus questioned. Many bishops threw their support behind the Program, but some opposed it, including Bishop William Turner of Buffalo and William Henry O'Connell of Boston. O'Connell believed some aspects of the plan smacked too much of socialism. Response outside the Church was also divided: labor organizations backing it, for example, and business groups criticizing it.

== New Deal era ==
Catholics provided a major component of the New Deal coalition, with a significant presence in the Democratic Party, local big-city political organizations, and rapidly enlarging labor unions.

Historian John McGreevey notes: "Priests across the country in the 1930s encouraging their parishioners to join unions, and some like Pittsburgh's Charles Rice, Detroit's Frederick Siedenberg, and Buffalo's Monsignor John P. Boland, served on regional labor boards and played key roles in workplace negotiations." The Catholic Worker Movement and Dorothy Day grew out of the same impetuses to put Catholic social teaching into action.

== National Center for Urban Ethnic Affairs ==
More recent examples of Catholic social justice in action is the Catholic Campaign for Human Development created in part as an outgrowth of the work of Msgr. Geno Baroni, who founded the National Center for Urban Ethnic Affairs (NCUEA). NCUEA spawned, funded and trained hundreds of parish, neighborhood and community-based organizations, organizers, credit unions, and local programs. Baroni's Catholic social justice in action included notable protégés, Rep. Marcy Kaptur, D-OH, currently the longest serving woman in Congress and Sen. Barbara Mikulski, D-MD. President Barack Obama's first community organizing project was funded by the Campaign for Human Development.

== Catholic worker movement ==
With the twentieth century and World War I, American Catholics began to emerge from their isolation. The immigrant church, in fact, began to go out of its way to assert its Americanness and ultra-loyalty. There was little Catholic protest against World War I. In May 1933 in New York City two American Catholics, Dorothy Day and Peter Maurin, founded a new Catholic peace group, the Catholic Worker that would embody their ideals of pacifism, commitment to the poor and to fundamental change in American society.

== Opposition to World War II ==
By 1941, just before Pearl Harbor, 97% of all Catholics polled opposed U.S. entry into World War II, far greater than the percentage of any Protestant denomination. Opposition to war, including pacifism, had a respectable and widespread appeal among American Catholics. This opposition took several forms, including the internationalist approach of CAIP (Catholic Association for International Peace). The Catholic hierarchy was almost universally opposed to the Burke-Wadsworth Act conscription bill of 1940. With the Japanese attack on Pearl Harbor on December 7, 1941 Catholic opposition to the war and the draft evaporated. Catholics, like most Americans, became fervent supporters of the war, both out of patriotic duty and from a sense of the justness of the struggle.

== Post World War II ==
After the war Catholic peacemaking narrowed down to a very few institutions, including the Catholic Worker, and individuals, including Dorothy Day, Robert Ludlow, Ammon Hennacy, and Thomas Merton. By the late 1950s, however, these small beginnings began to bear fruit in a more widespread religious peace movement that then blossomed during the Vietnam War. The impetus of the war and the reform impulse of Vatican II created a new Catholic peace movement that included the Catholic Worker, the Catholic Peace Fellowship, the Daniel Berrigan, Philip Berrigan, Elizabeth McAlister and the Catonsville Nine.

After the war activities were carried on by such individuals as Joseph Fahey and Eileen Egan who were instrumental in the creation of Pax Christi and continuing Catholic peace efforts into the 20th century. Other Catholic peacemakers have included Cesar Chavez, the Sanctuary movement, and Witness for Peace.

== Opposition to capital punishment ==
The U.S. Catholic Bishops' Statement on Capital Punishment of 1974, declared a commitment to the value and dignity of human life. Bishop John May, of Mobile, Alabama, proposed a brief resolution which said simply: "The U.S. Catholic Conference goes on record in opposition to capital punishment." Catholic teaching accepts the principle that the state has the right to take the life of a person guilty of an extremely serious crime, and that the state may take appropriate measures to protect itself and its citizens from grave harm, nevertheless, the question for judgment and decision today is whether capital punishment is justifiable under present circumstances. The Catechism of the Catholic Church (no. 2267) states: "If...non-lethal means are sufficient to defend and protect people's safety from the aggressor, authority will limit itself to such means, as these are more in keeping with the concrete conditions of the common good and more in conformity with the dignity of the human person".

== "New" Catholic social activism ==
Andrew Greeley describes the mid-70s as a demarcation between the “old" Catholic social activist and the “new" Catholic social activist or the “pre-Berrigan” and “post-Berrigan” approaches to activism. Both traditions appear to co-exist, today. In “Catholic Social Activism – Real or Rad/Chic?”, Greeley saw the old social justice action in labor schools, labor priest, and community organizing that “mastered the politics of coalition building with the system.” Leading figures in that “old” tradition for Greeley were Ryan, Higgins, Egan and Baroni. On the other hand, the “new” Catholic action came out of the Berrigan experience and the peace movement and was heavily involved in confrontation and protest. The "new" tradition's lack of tangible success in comparison to the "old" tradition, Greeley scathingly predicted:

"The old social actionists are largely men of action, doers, not talkers. The new social actionists are intellectuals...They are masters at manipulating words and sometimes ideas...They are fervent crusaders. [But] winning strikes, forming unions, organizing communities are not their 'things', they are much more concerned about creating world economic justice."

However, although likewise distinguishing between historical and contemporary Catholic engagement, some scholars see the efficacy and potential of newer forms of Catholic activism.

== Christian Democratic Party in the United States ==
Inspired by Christian Democratic parties and movements in South America and Europe, David Frost and Kirk Morrison along with others founded the Christian Democratic Party USA in 2011. In 2012, the name of the party was changed to the American Solidarity Party. The American Solidarity Party welcomed a growth in membership of voters who adhere to Catholic Social Teaching, but who could not find a "home" in either of the main parties. The principles of the American Solidarity Party were aligned with the even principles of Catholic Social Teaching. The party membership nominated Amir Azarvan and Mike Maturen to run as President and Vice President in the 2016 election. When Azarvan had to step down as presidential candidate, Maturen ran for the presidency while Juan Muñoz was selected to campaign as vice president. Through ranked-choice voting among members and party convention delegates, the American Solidarity Party chose Brian Carroll and Amar Patel to run a national campaign or the presidency and vice-presidency of the United States. Carroll and Patel achieved ballot access in 8 states, and registered write-in status in 25 others. In 2021, former Loyola Marymount University philosophy professor, James Hanink, was selected to run as the American Solidarity Party candidate to replace California Governor Gavin Newsom in the statewide recall election. The principles stated in the American Solidarity Party platform in 2021 covered: Sanctity of Life, Social Justice, Community-Oriented Society, Centrality of the Family, Economic Security, Care for the Environment, and Peace and International Solidarity.
