= Pax Christi =

International Catholic peace organization

Pax Christi International logo

Pax Christi International is an international Catholic peace movement. The Pax Christi International website declares its mission is "to transform a world shaken by violence, terrorism, deepening inequalities, and global insecurity".

== History ==
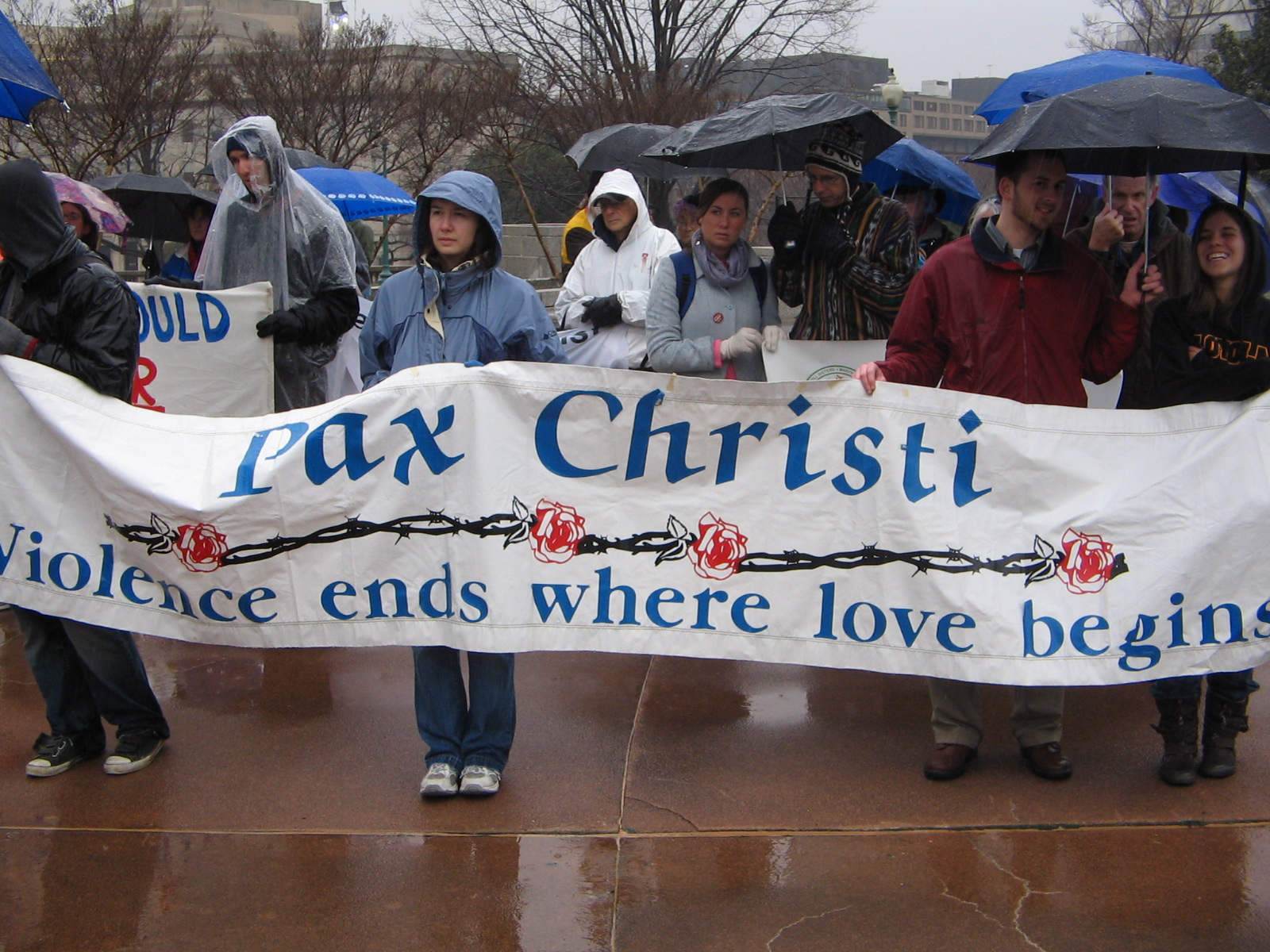
Pax Christi protesting the U.S. invasion of Iraq (Washington, D.C., March 2008).

Pax Christi (Latin for Peace of Christ) was established in France in March 1945 by Marthe Dortel-Claudot and Bishop Pierre-Marie Théas, after the Germans had been expelled from France but before the end of World War II in Europe. Both were French citizens interested in reconciliation between French and German citizens in the aftermath of the war. Some of the first actions of Pax Christi were the organisation of kindness pilgrimages and other actions fostering reconciliation between France and Germany. Although Pax Christi initially began as a movement for French-German reconciliation, it expanded its focus and spread to other European countries in the 1950s. It grew as “a crusade of prayer for peace among all nations.”

Pax Christi was recognized as "the official international Catholic peace movement" by Pope Pius XII in 1952. It also has chapters in the United States. In the 1960s, it became involved in Mississippi in organizing economic boycotts of businesses that discriminated against blacks, in an effort to support protesters in the civil rights movement, who were trying to end discrimination in facilities and employment. It was active in Greenwood, Mississippi, among other places. In 1983, Pax Christi International was awarded the UNESCO Peace Education Prize. The Pax Christi network membership is made up of 18 national sections and 115 Member Organizations working in over 50 countries.

In 2017 Bishop Manfred Scheuer resigned from his post as chairman of the Austrian branch of Pax Christi, citing anti-Semitism as a reason. He cited in particular the verbal harassment of Jews who attended a lecture sponsored by Pax Christi.

== Peace work ==
Pax Christi focuses on human rights, human security, disarmament and demilitarisation, nonviolence, nuclear disarmament, extractives in Latin America, and a renewed peace process for Israel-Palestine. Since 1988, the organisation gives out the Pax Christi International Peace Award to peace organisations and peace activists around the world.

== Organization ==
Pax Christi is made up of national sections of the movement, affiliated organizations and partner organizations. Its International Secretariat is in Brussels. Pax Christi has consultative status as a non-governmental organization at the United Nations.

== International presidents ==
- Maurice Feltin (1950–1965)
- Bernard Alfrink (1965–1978)
- Luigi Bettazzi (1978–1985)
- Franz König (1985–1990)
- Godfried Danneels (1990–1999)
- Michel Sabbah (1999–2007)

In 2007, a co-presidency was created with a bishop and a lay woman.

- Laurent Monsengwo (2007–2010)
- Marie Dennis (2007–2019)
- Kevin Dowling (C.SS.R.) (2010–2019)
- Sr. Teresia Wamuyu Wachira, IBVM (2019–present)
- Bishop Jose Colin Bagaforo (2019–present)

== See also ==
- Catholic peace traditions
- List of anti-war organizations
- Pope Paul VI Teacher of Peace Award
- Religion and peacebuilding
