= Ecological self =

Concept in environmental philosophy

In environmental philosophy, ecological self is central to the school of Experiential Deep Ecology, which, based on the work of Norwegian philosopher Arne Næss, argues that through the process of self-actualisation, one transcends the notions of the individuated "egoic" self and arrives at a position of an ecological self. So long as one is working within the narrower concept of self, Næss argues, environmentally responsible behaviour is a form of altruism, a "doing good for the other", which historically has been a precarious ethical basis, usually involved in exhorting others to "be good". Næss argues that in his Ecosophy, the enlargement of the ego-self to the eco-self results in environmentally responsible behaviour as a form of self-interest.

Warwick Fox argued that Næss's philosophy was based upon a variety of "transpersonal ecology" in which self-interest was firmly embedded within the interest of the community ecosphere of which the self was eternally embedded

As deep ecologist John Seed has stated, "Deep ecology critiques the idea that we are the crown of creation, the measure of all being: that the world is a pyramid with humanity rightly on top, merely a resource, and that nature has instrumental value only". The concept of the Ecological Self goes beyond anthropocentrism, which, by contrast locates human concerns as the exclusive source of all value. It draws upon the Land Ethic of Aldo Leopold. Leopold argued that within conventional ethics, the land itself was considered only as property, occupying a role analogous to slavery in earlier societies that permitted the ownership of people. By comparison a land ethic enlarges the boundary of moral concern to include "soils, waters, plants, and animals, or collectively: the land". The basis of such a non-anthropocentric ethic, according to Leopold was that "A thing is right when it tends to preserve the integrity, stability, and beauty of the biotic community. It is wrong when it tends otherwise."

Like Thomas Berry and Brian Swimme, ecological philosopher Freya Mathews argues that in considering the ecological self, we need to look beyond the present to the "deep time" of ages past, in the evolution of life and the creation of the cosmos, in order to consider the real roots of human consciousness. Experiential deep ecologist Joanna Macy speaks of the Ecological Self in her book "World as Lover, World as Self", and uses the concept in her work on "Deep Time".

== See also ==
- Ecopsychology
- Value-action gap
