= Gabriel Moran =

American theologian (1935–2021)

Gabriel Moran AFSC
- Moran in February 2013

Personal life
- Born: Richard Moran; August 11, 1935 Manchester, New Hampshire
- Died: October 15, 2021 (aged 86) New York City, New York
- Spouse: Maria Harris (m. 1986; died 2005)
- Parent(s): John Moran & Mary Murphy
- Notable work(s): The Theology of Revelation, Scripture and Tradition
- Education: Catholic University of America
- Occupation: Former religious brother, theologian and religious educator at New York University

Religious life
- Religion: Catholic Church

Gabriel Moran AFSC (11 August 1935 – 15 October 2021) was an American scholar and teacher in the fields of Christian theology and religious education. His writings made significant contributions to the development of Catholic theology in the years following the Second Vatican Council. His writings have been translated into Dutch, French, German, Italian, Japanese, Korean, Portuguese, and Spanish. He held the title of Professor Emeritus in the Department of Humanities and the Social Sciences at New York University, where he also served as the co-director of the Philosophy of Education Program.

== Life ==
Moran was born in Manchester, New Hampshire, the fourth of the five children of John Moran, later the president of the municipal Manchester Transportation Company, and of his wife, Mary Murphy. He attended the local parochial school and a Catholic high school for his basic education. After this, he studied for a year at the University of New Hampshire.

At this point in his life, Moran entered the novitiate of the Brothers of the Christian Schools (commonly called the De La Salle or Lasallian Brothers), the first Roman Catholic teaching order of laymen, founded in 17th-century France and located in Barrytown, New York. He received the religious habit on 7 September 1954, and was given the religious name Cyprian Gabriel. After completing his novitiate period the following year, he was sent to complete his college studies at the Catholic University of America in Washington, D.C., where he graduated in 1958, summa cum laude, with a bachelor's degree in philosophy. He was then assigned to a high school run by the Brothers in Providence, Rhode Island, where he taught mathematics and religion for the next three years.

During that period while he was teaching high school boys, Brother Moran also earned a master's degree in Religious Education from Catholic University, which he completed in 1962. His master's won widespread notice in the religious community, due to its contribution to the need for reformulating traditional categories of theological thought created by the declarations of the council. It was published the following year as Scripture and Tradition. In 1962 he was assigned to teach the younger Brothers at De La Salle College in Washington, D.C., where he taught philosophy and theology, while he pursued a doctorate in Religious Education at Catholic University. He was awarded this in 1965.

Moran moved to New York City, where he was named the director of the Graduate Program of Theology and Religious Education at Manhattan College, run by the Brothers in the Bronx (1965–1970), and at New York Theological Seminary, connected to the Episcopal Church (1968–1973). During that period, he published Theology and Revelation, which touched on the Catholic Church's formulations of its own identity. Like his previous book, it was met by widespread discussion. Additionally, he was elected the Provincial Superior of the Brothers of the Province of Long Island and New England (1970–1973). He also published Experiences in Community with Sister Maria Harris, S.S.J., another leading figure in religious education.

From that point, Moran developed a focus on adult education, shifting from the sole focus on children traditionally the focus in the field. To develop this, he created a non-profit organization, Alternative Religious Education, of which he was president.

In 1981 Moran joined the Department of Humanities and the Social Sciences of New York University, where he taught religion, philosophy, and the history of education. He made the decision to leave the Brothers of the Christian Schools, and was given a release from his religious vows in 1985 by the Holy See. In April 1986 he wed his colleague, Maria Harris, a former nun who had left her convent in 1973. They remained married until her death in 2005. That same year he became Director of the Program of Religious Education at New York University, holding that post until 1997.

Moran's scholarship has played a significant role in ecclesiology and in the development of religious education. This can be seen in the large number of leading figures in the field who consider his work seminal in their own development.

== Works ==
- Scripture and Tradition, New York: Herder and Herder (1963)
- Theology of Revelation, New York: Herder and Herder (1966)
- Catechesis of Revelation, New York: Herder and Herder (1966)
- God still speaks: The Basis of Christian Education, London: Burns & Oates (1967)
- Experiences in Community, New York: Herder and Herder (1968)
- Vision and Tactics: Towards an Adult Church, New York: Herder and Herder (1968)
- The New Community, with Maria Harris, S.S.J., New York: Herder and Herder (1970)
- Design for Religion: Toward Ecumenical Education, New York: Herder and Herder (1970)
- The Present Revelation, New York: McGraw Hill (1972)
- Religious Body: Design for a New Reformation, New York: Seabury Press (1974)
- Education toward Adulthood: Religion and Lifelong Learning, New York: Paulist Press (1977)
- Interplay: Religion and Education, Winona, Minnesota: St. Mary's Press (1979)
- Religious Education Development: Images for the Future, Minneapolis: Winston Press (1979)
- No Ladder to the Sky: Morality and Education, San Francisco: Harper (1987)
- Religious Education as a Second Language, Birmingham: Religious Education Press (1989)
- Uniqueness: Problem or Paradox in Jewish and Christian Traditions, Maryknoll: Orbis Press (1992)
- A Grammar of Responsibility, New York: Crossroad Press (1996)
- Showing how: The Act of Teaching, Valley Forge: Trinity Press (1997)
- Reshaping Religious Education, Louisville: Westminster (1998)
- Both Sides: The Story of Revelation, New York: Paulist Press (2002)
- Fashioning a People Today: The Educational Insights of Maria Harris, New London: Twenty-Third (2007)
- Speaking of Teaching: Lessons from History, Lanham: Rowman and Littlefield (2008)
- Believing in a Revealing God, Collegeville: Liturgical Press (2009)
- Living Nonviolently: Language for Resisting Violence, Lanham, Maryland: Lexington Books (2011)
