= Joseph Fahey =

American Catholic theologian

Joseph Fahey (also Joseph J. Fahey) is an American Catholic theologian who specializes in Labor Studies and Peace Studies.

== Education and profession ==
He received his B.A. in Philosophy (1962) and his M.A. in Theology (1966) from Maryknoll Seminary (Maryknoll is the Catholic Foreign Mission Society of America). He received his Ph.D. in Religion (Christian Social Ethics) from New York University in 1974. He served as a professor of Theology and later Religious Studies at Manhattan College from 1966-2016. He was a co-founder of the College's B.A. in Peace Studies and the founder of the College's B.A. in Labor Studies. He has taught courses on Contemporary Moral Issues, Religious Dimensions of Peace, and the Labor Studies Colloquium. He is the co-founder of Catholic Scholars for Worker Justice (www.cswj.us).

== Achievements ==
Fahey is the co-editor of A Peace Reader (Paulist, 1990), the author of War and the Christian Conscience (Orbis Books, 2005), and edited with an Introduction to Walter Rauschenbusch: Essential Spiritual Writings (Orbis Books, 2019). He was a co-founder of Pax Christi USA and served on the National Council of The Fellowship of Reconciliation, The Consortium on Peace Research, Education and Development (COPRED), the Peace Studies Association, and Interfaith Worker Justice.
