= Embassy of China, Washington, D.C. =

Diplomatic mission

Embassy of the People's Republic of China in the United States 中国驻美国大使馆
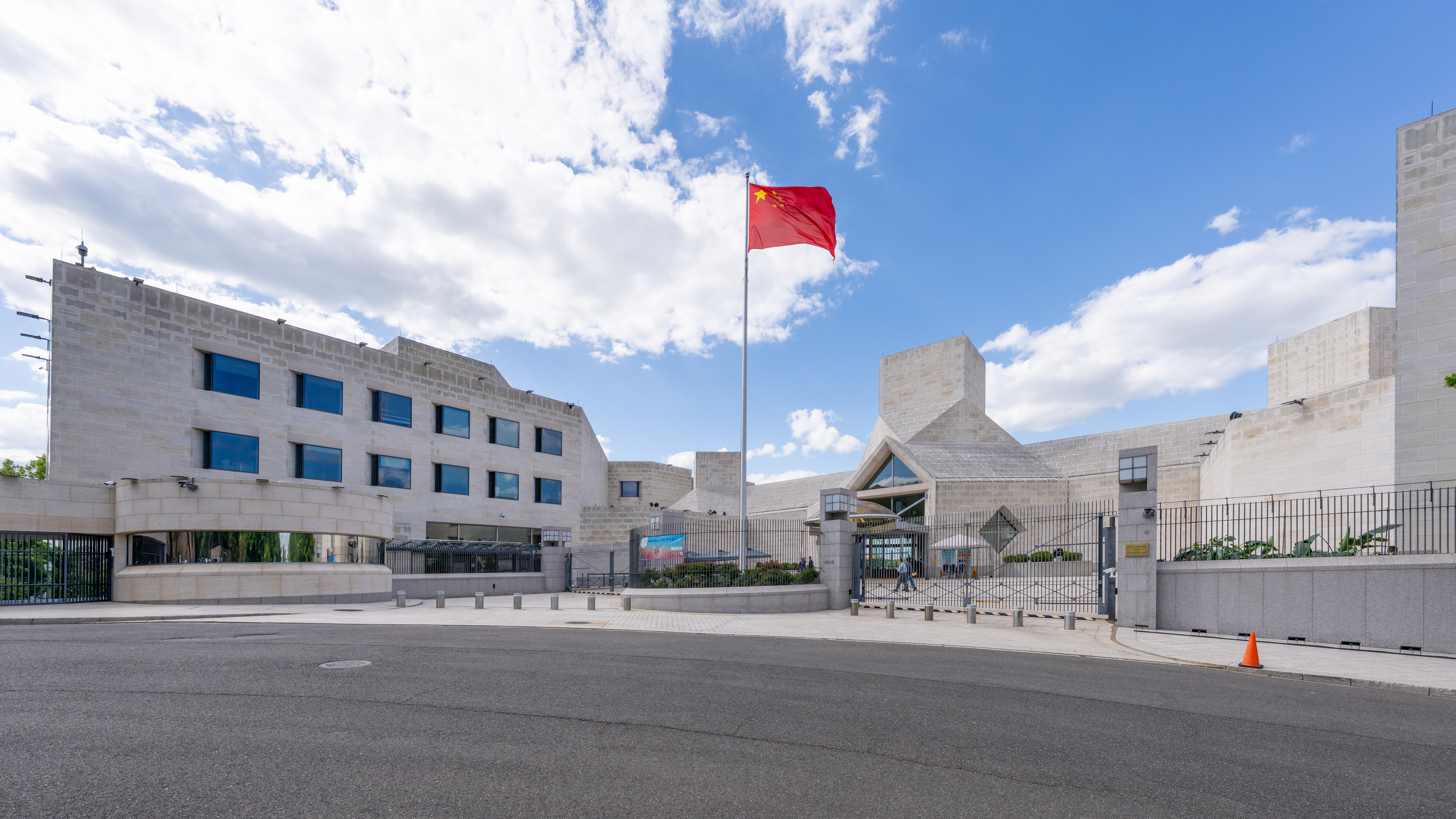
- Location: Washington, D.C.
- Address: 3505 International Place, N.W.
- Coordinates: 38°56′33″N 77°3′59″W
- Ambassador: Xie Feng
- Website: us.china-embassy.gov.cn/eng/

The Embassy of the People's Republic of China in the United States (simplified Chinese: 中国驻美国大使馆; traditional Chinese: 中國駐美國大使館; pinyin: zhōngguó zhù měiguó dàshǐ guǎn) is the diplomatic mission of the People's Republic of China to the United States, located in Washington D.C.

The main chancery is located at 3505 International Place NW, Washington, D.C., in the Forest Hills neighborhood, while the visa section is located at 2201 Wisconsin Avenue NW in the Glover Park neighborhood. China also operates consulates general in Chicago, Los Angeles, San Francisco, and New York City.

== History ==
=== Qing Empire and Republic of China ===
The Qing Empire opened its first mission to the U.S. in 1875, with Chen Lanbin as minister. From 1877 to 1883, the legation rented the former luxury town house of Alexander Shepherd designed by Adolf Cluss on 1705 K Street NW, one of Washington DC's most distinguished addresses at the time.

Then and until 1893, the legation was located in Stewart's Castle on Dupont Circle; and later, under Minister Wu Tingfang, in the former mansion of Thomas Franklin Schneider at 18th and Q Street, NW.

In 1902, the Qing legation moved to a purpose-built mansion designed by Waddy Butler Wood on 2001 19th Street NW. It is the oldest extant building erected in Washington by a foreign government, following the demolition in 1931 of the former British Legation on Connecticut Avenue, built in 1872. This became the legation of the Republic of China following the fall of the Qing Dynasty in 1912. In 1935, the legation was upgraded to an embassy, and Alfred Sao-ke Sze became China's first ambassador to the U.S.

The embassy remained in the same building until 1944, then moved to the former Fahnestock Mansion designed by Nathan C. Wyeth on 2311 Massachusetts Avenue NW, where it stayed until official diplomatic relations were terminated on January 1, 1979. That building is now the embassy of Haiti.

Meanwhile, in 1937 the Republic of China's ambassador Chengting T. Wang (Wang Zhengting) started renting the Twin Oaks estate as ambassadorial residence from its then owner Grace Fortescue, and his successor Wellington Koo purchased it outright from her in 1947 for $350,000. The ROC kept it away from the People's Republic by transferring it temporarily for $10 in 1978 to a third-party owner, the Friends of Free China Association, and purchased it again in 1982. In the meantime, the Taiwan Relations Act of April 1979 provided additional legal protection to the Republic of China's ownership of Twin Oaks.

=== People's Republic of China ===
In the wake of the China-U.S. rapprochement of the early 1970s initiated by president Richard Nixon and his National Security Advisor Henry Kissinger, the principle of opening a liaison office, to be led by Chinese diplomat Huang Zhen, was agreed during Kissinger's visit to Beijing in February 1973, together with that of a parallel U.S. liaison office in Beijing. The first 10-strong delegation arrived in Washington on April 18, 1973, a few weeks ahead of the formal opening in May, and initially stayed for several months at the luxury Mayflower Hotel.

For the permanent chancery, Huang initially tried to purchase the former International Inn, then called the Ramada Inn, a highly visible building on Thomas Circle designed by Morris Lapidus and first opened in 1962 (still extant in altered form as the Washington Plaza Hotel). The negotiation foundered on price, however, and the liaison office was established instead in two adjacent buildings on a significantly less prominent location: respectively the Windsor Park hotel and apartments at 2300 Connecticut Avenue NW, and the St. Albans apartment building at 2310 Connecticut Avenue NW. The purchase was made at a steep price and publicized in November 1973. The Chinese team, which by then had grown to about 50 people, moved in soon afterwards. On January 1, 1979, this complex became a fully-fledged embassy in line with the Joint Communiqué on the Establishment of Diplomatic Relations released the same day.

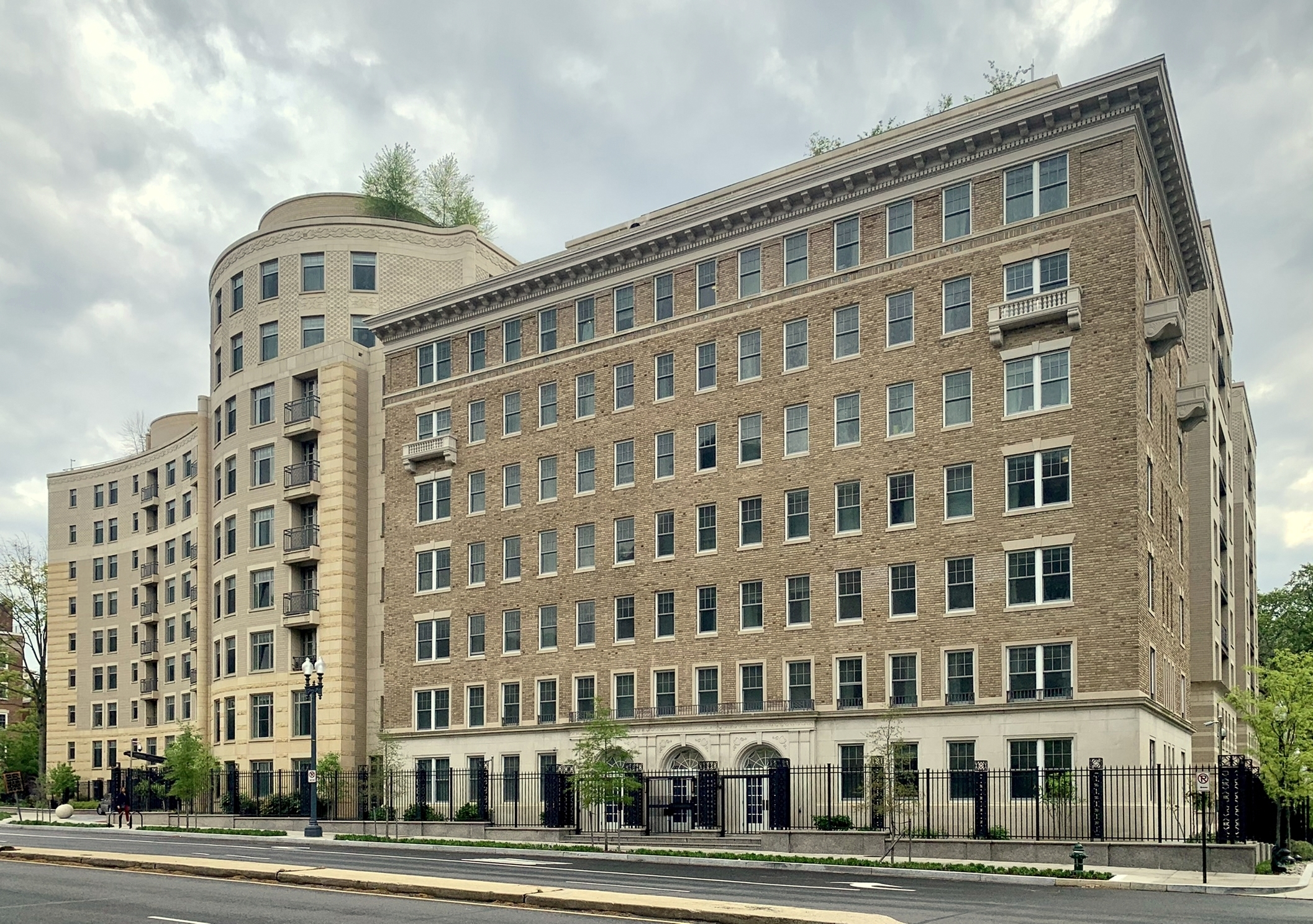
The apartment building for Chinese embassy employees

Meanwhile, in 1973 Huang and his team identified four houses on S Street NW in the Kalorama neighborhood of Washington, D.C. for the residence of senior staff, including the former Adolph C. Miller house at 2230 S Street NW that Huang had intended as his residence. Eventually China only purchased two of these four houses: the former home of educator and diplomat William Richards Castle Jr., designed in 1929 by Carrère and Hastings at 2200 S Street NW; and that of bankers William Andrew Mearns and Edward Stellwagen, designed in 1905 by Frost & Granger at 2301 S Street NW, which became the ambassador's residence. On March 1, 1979, ambassador Chai Zemin went from there to the White House to present his credentials to Jimmy Carter.

The current chancery building in the International Chancery Center was built between 2005 and 2009 on a design by Pei Partnership Architects, with I. M. Pei as consultant. The construction contractor was China Construction America, a subsidiary of China State Construction Engineering. The new building's first day of operation was April 1, 2009.

The previous embassy complex on Connecticut Avenue was torn down in 2012 (except the 1922 St. Albans façade on Connecticut Avenue) to be replaced by a 130-unit apartment building for Chinese embassy employees, on a design by Phil Esocoff, since 2015 a member of the global leadership at Gensler.

== Protests ==
Soon after the embassy opened in 1979, four members of the Maoist group Revolutionary Communist Party, USA vandalized and ransacked the embassy as means of protesting the upcoming visit by Deng Xiaoping to the United States. The police caught and arrested all four members, including the leader, Jim E Loudermilk, who was found in possession of an unregistered firearm. Against U.S. Attorney Earl J. Silbert's objections, Judge June Green gave the group lenience and sentenced them to probation and $815 restitution.

On February 5, 2014, the Uyghur American Association organized a demonstration in front of the Embassy of China in Washington, D.C. to commemorate the 17th anniversary of the Ghulja Incident.

In January 2022 a protest against China's hosting of the 2022 Winter Olympics was held in Washington, D.C. outside the embassy. Attendees included Chen Guangcheng and Chris Smith. Smith described the 2022 Olympics as the “Genocide Games.”

On September 24, 2023, Christopher Rodriguez, an attorney from Panama City, Florida, attempted to set off a bag of explosives outside of the embassy. He placed the bag next to a streetlight near the back wall and fired at it with a rifle, but he missed and the explosives failed to detonate. In 2022, Rodriguez had set off explosives next to a sculpture of Mao Zedong and Vladimir Lenin in San Antonio, though the sculpture, designed by the Gao Brothers, was making fun of Mao and Lenin.

=== Street renaming proposals ===
In June 2014 during the 113th United States Congress, Republican Senator Ted Cruz introduced a simple resolution while Republican Representative Frank Wolf also proposed to rename the street in front of the Chinese Embassy after the Chinese dissident Liu Xiaobo. This would make the embassy's new address "1 Liu Xiaobo Plaza". However, both of them got stuck in the introduction stage. BBC reported that Hua Chunying, a spokeswoman for the Ministry of Foreign Affairs of the People's Republic of China, dismissed the lawmakers' move as "nothing more than a sheer farce", and restated the government's position that Liu had been convicted for breaking domestic laws. The New York Times also reported that when Hua was asked if China would retaliate by renaming the street in front of the Embassy of the United States, Beijing, she smiled and asked rhetorically, "Do you think China should take identical action as America?" Many Chinese commented online, suggesting China do just that. Proposals included "Prisoners Abused Street", "Edward Snowden Street", "Osama bin Laden Road" and even "Monica Lewinsky Street".

During the 114th United States Congress in 2016, both Sen. Cruz and Rep. Mark Meadows introduced bills to continue the efforts. On February 12, the Senate passed Cruz's version unanimously. On February 16, the administration announced that US President Barack Obama would veto legislation for the renaming act. Hong Lei, a spokesman for the Chinese Foreign Ministry, said at a press conference that China hoped that the Obama administration could "put an end to this political farce." On February 23, Cruz's bill was referred to U.S. House Committee on Oversight and Government Reform but never cleared the House to present to President Obama for him to veto it.

During the 115th United States Congress, on May 18, 2017, Sen. Cruz and Rep. Meadows re-introduced bills to resume their push to rename the address. After Dr. Liu's death on July 13, Bob Fu, a Chinese American human rights activist and pastor, told The Texas Tribune that he is "definitely more optimistic" about Cruz's bill getting enacted with President Donald Trump in office.

In 2020, a group of Republican senators and representatives proposed renaming the street after whistleblower Li Wenliang, who was warned by authorities after drawing attention to the initial outbreak of COVID-19 in Wuhan.

== Gallery ==
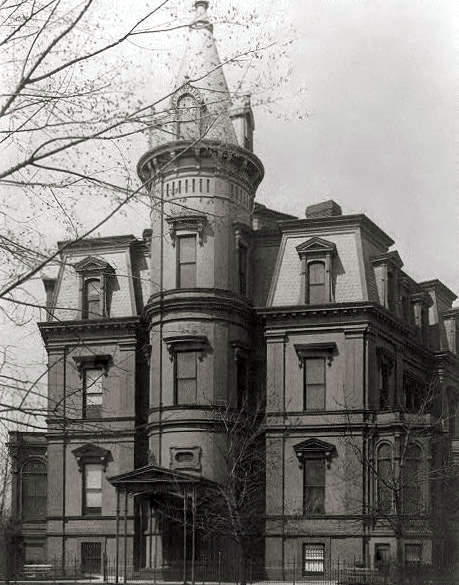
Stewart's Castle on Dupont Circle, Qing Empire legation 1886-93 (demolished in 1901)

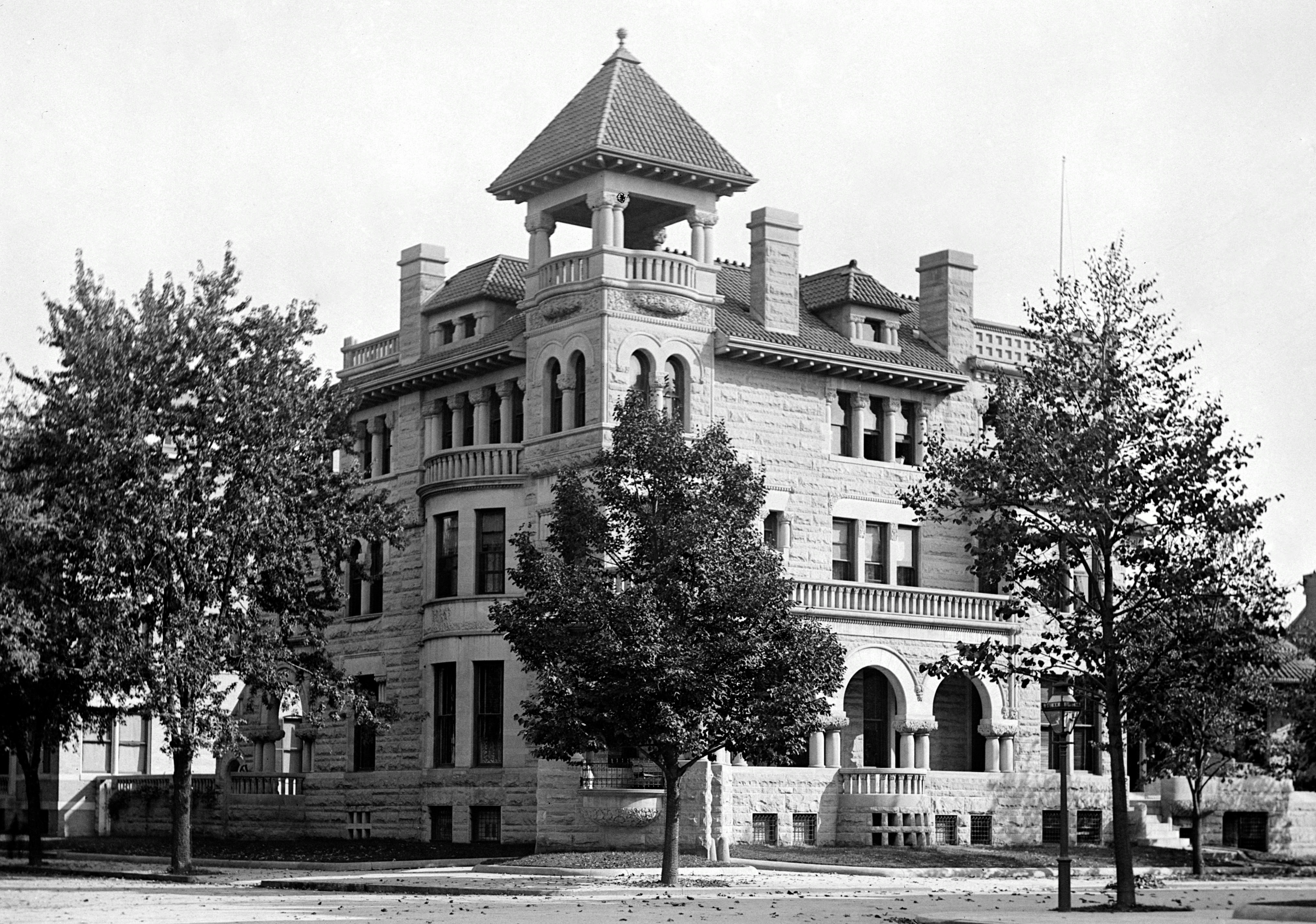
Mansion of Thomas Franklin Schneider on 18th Street NW, legation around 1900 (demolished in 1958)

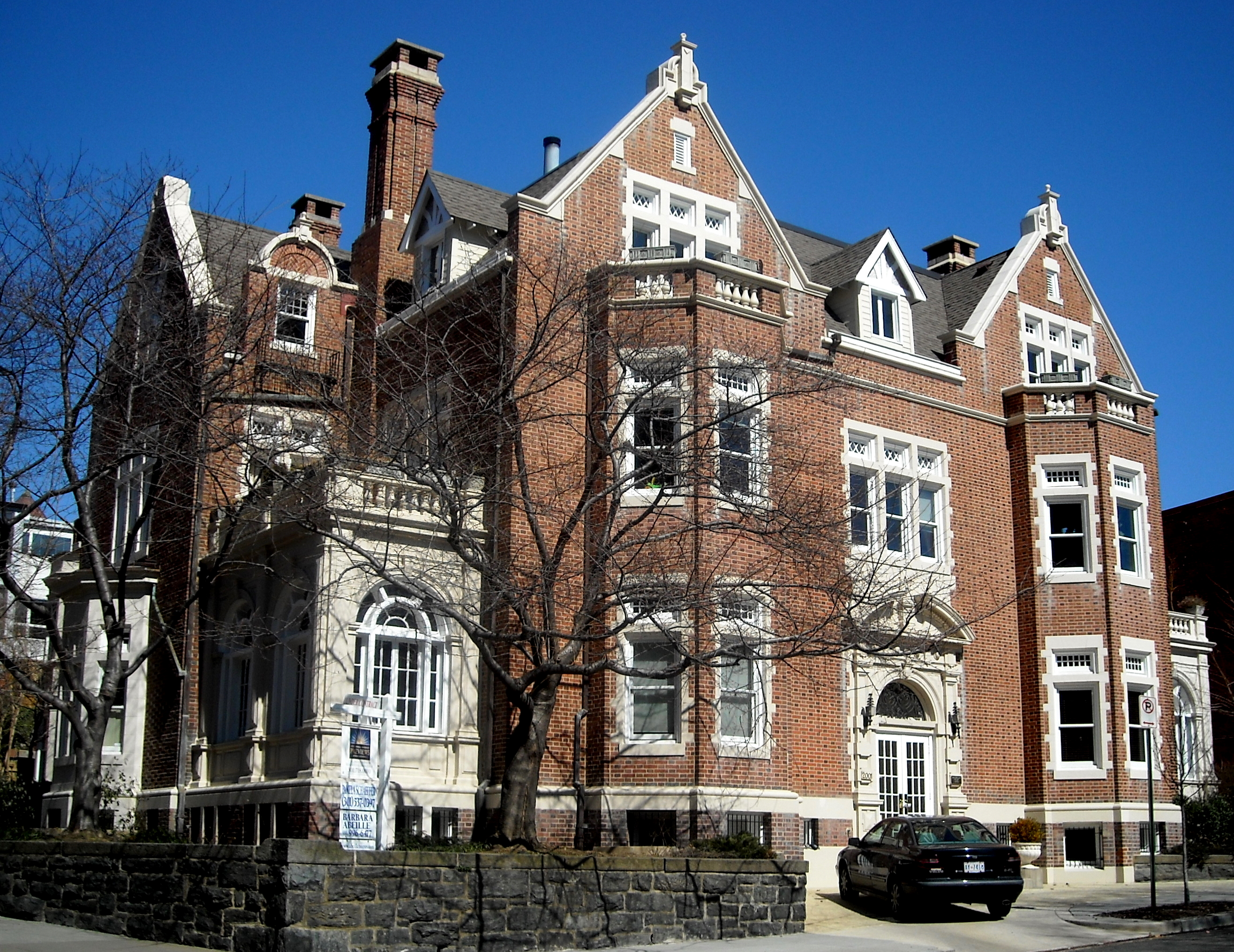
Legation/embassy from 1902 to 1944 on 19th Street NW (now Chinese Embassy condominiums)

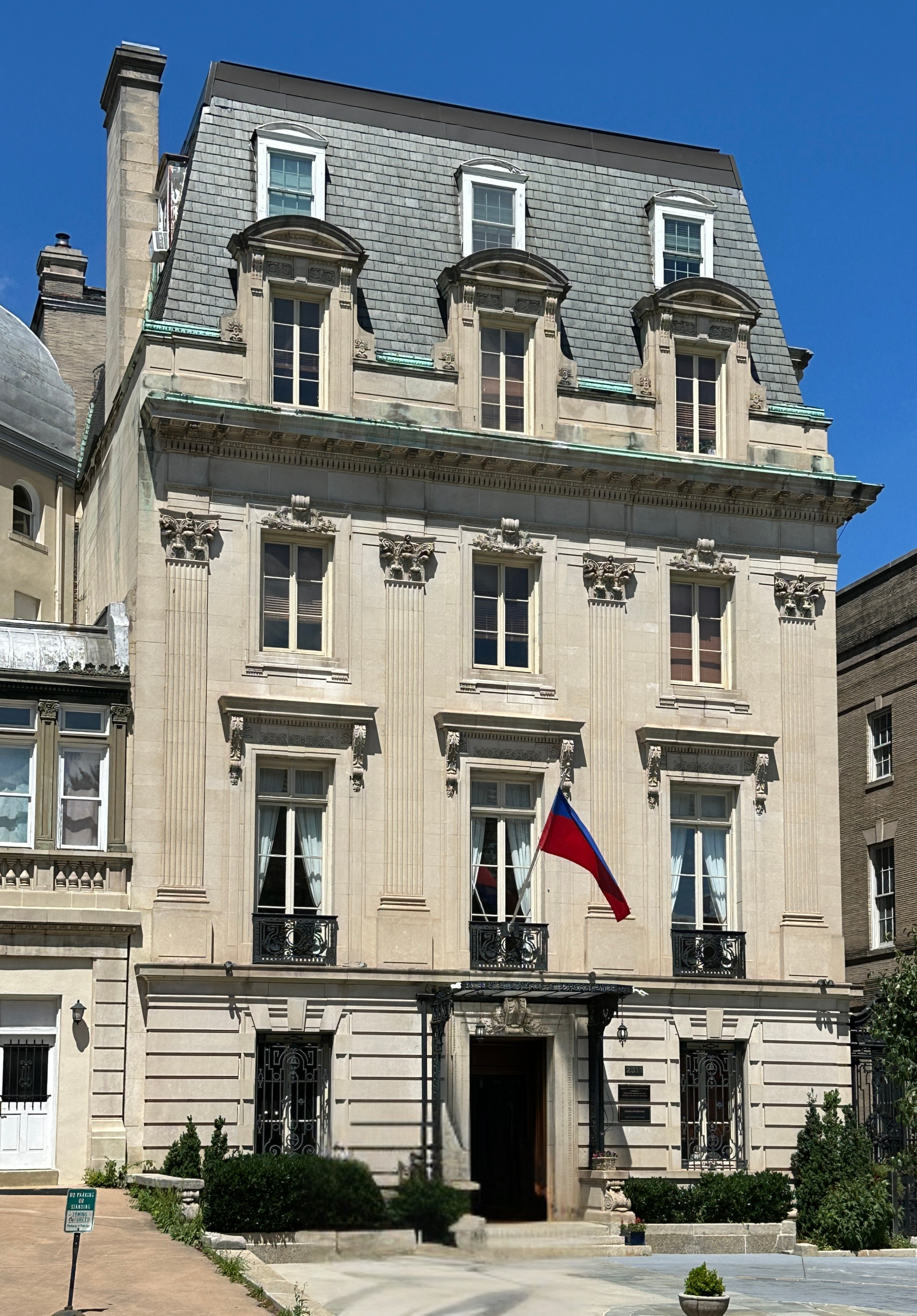
ROC embassy from 1944 to 1978, previously Gibson Fahnestock House on Embassy Row (now Embassy of Haiti)

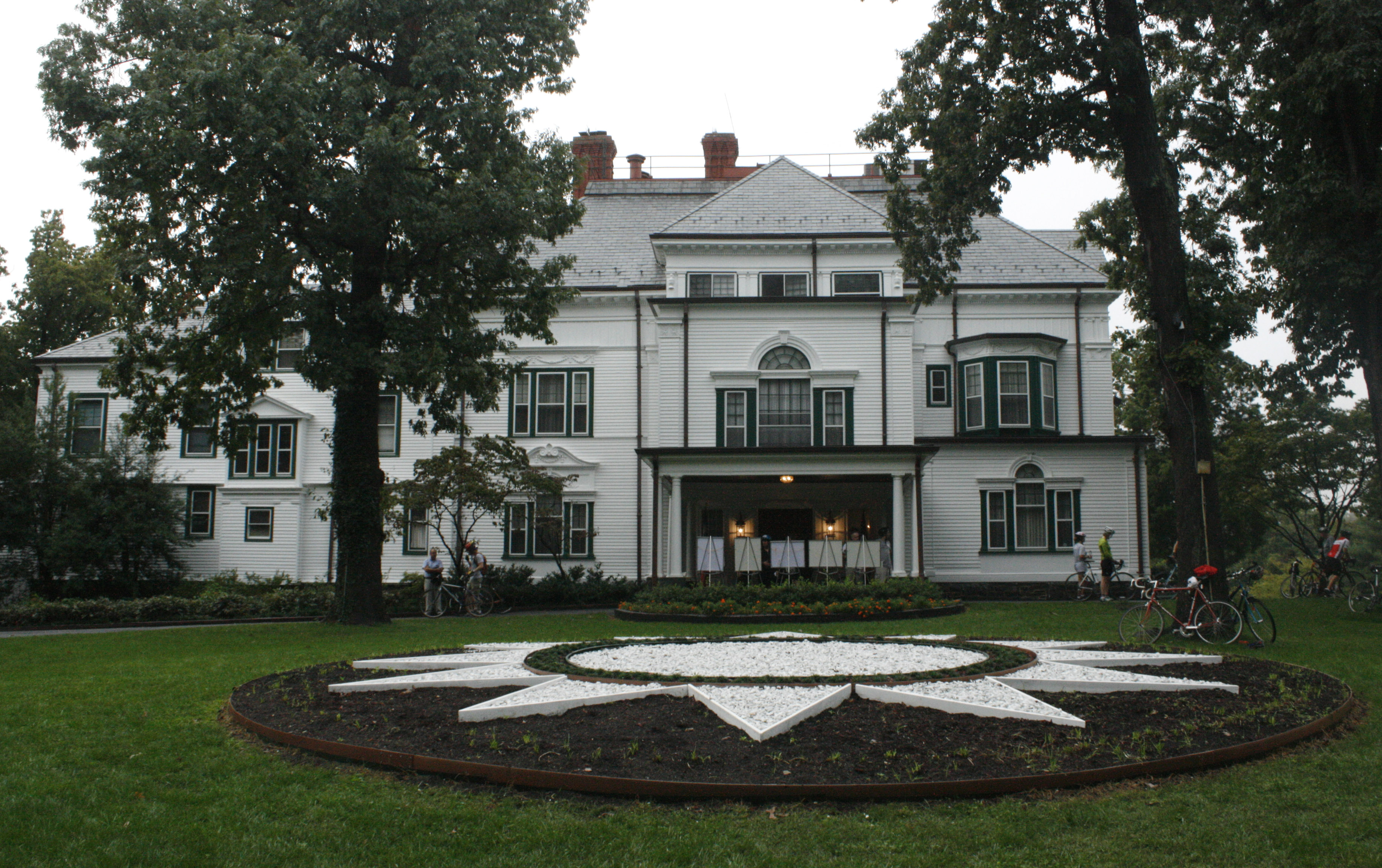
Twin Oaks Estate, Cleveland Park

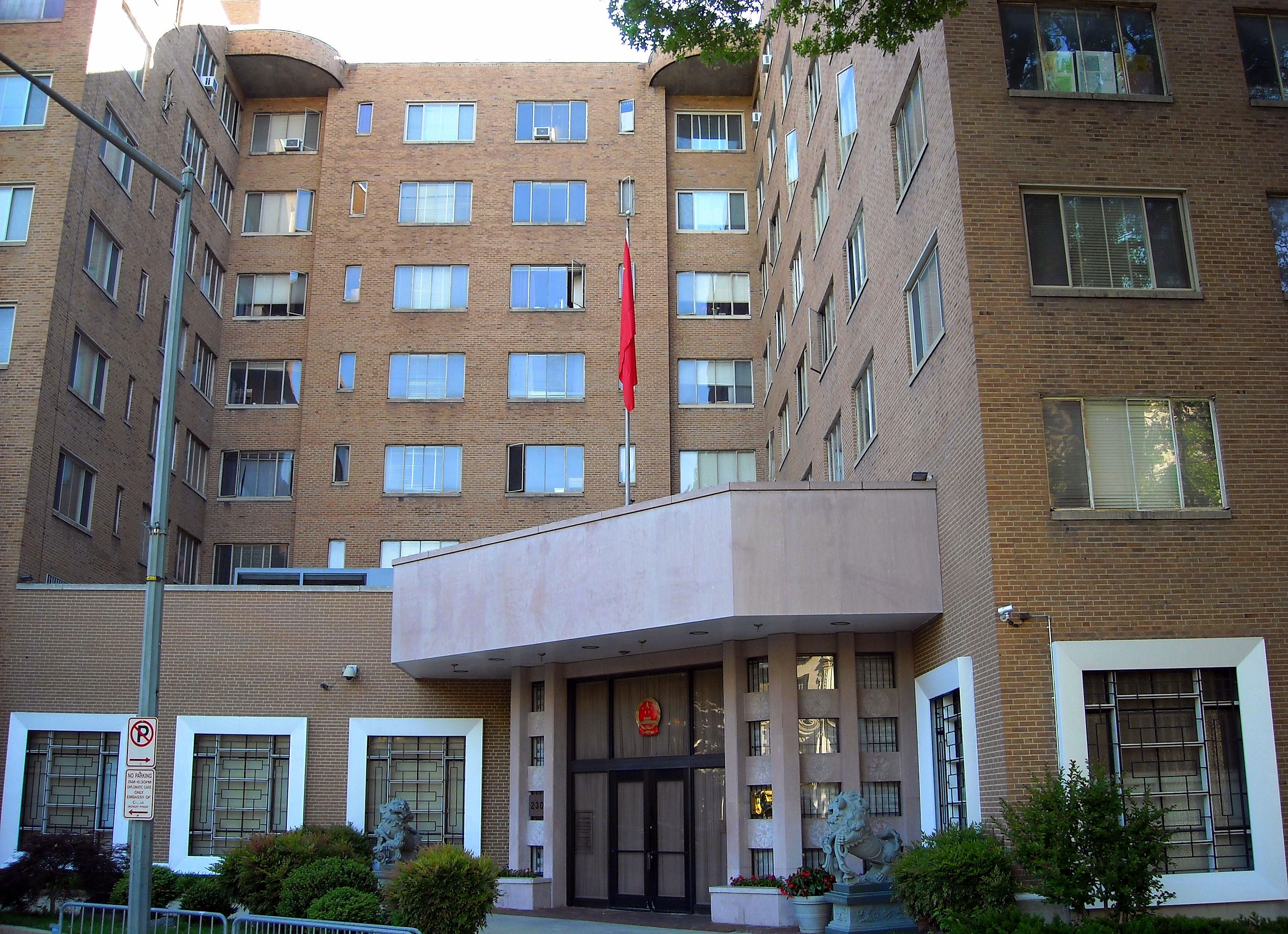
PRC Liaison Office then embassy from 1973 to 2009 on Connecticut Avenue (demolished in 2012)

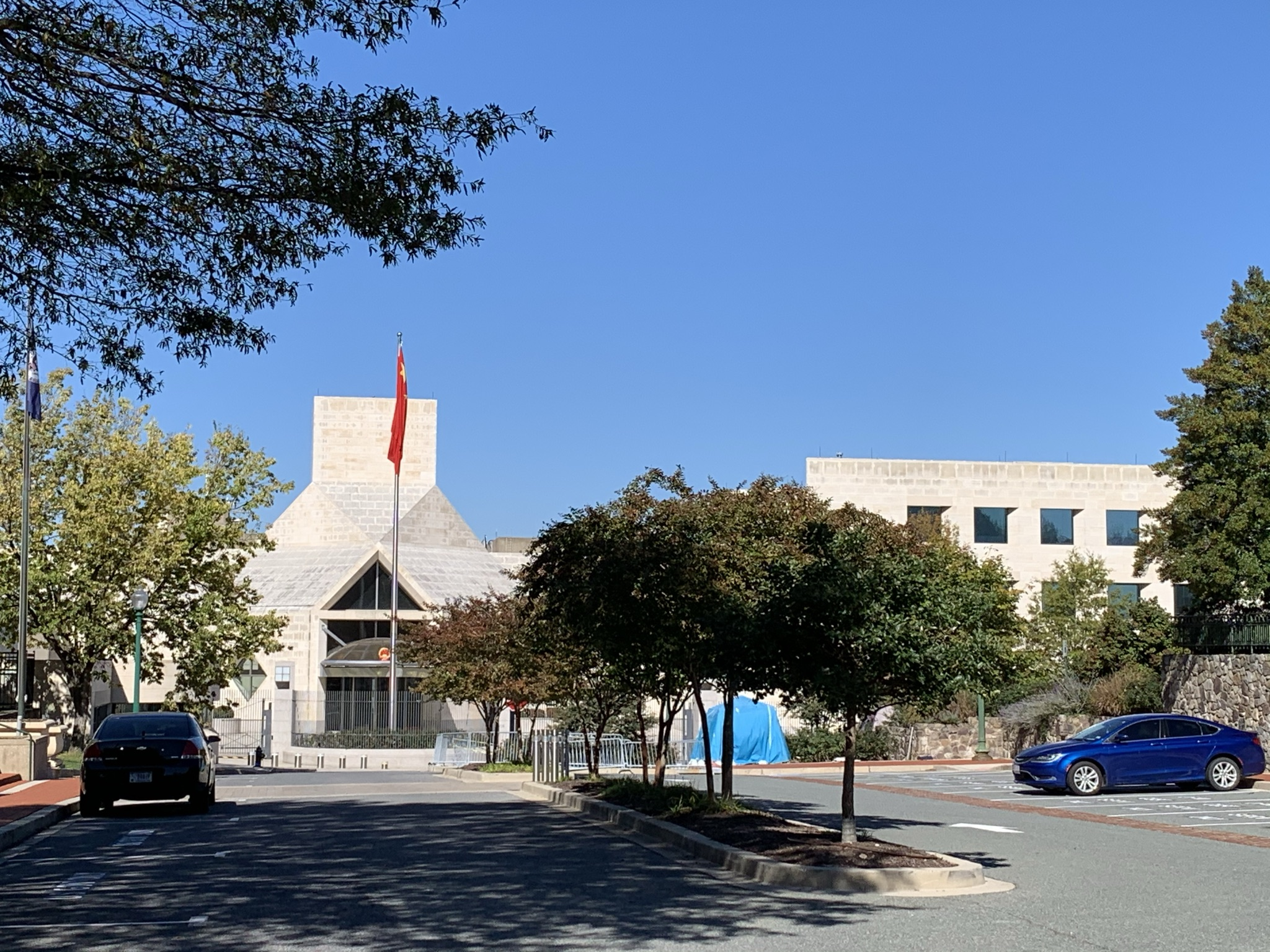
The current chancery building viewed from International Place

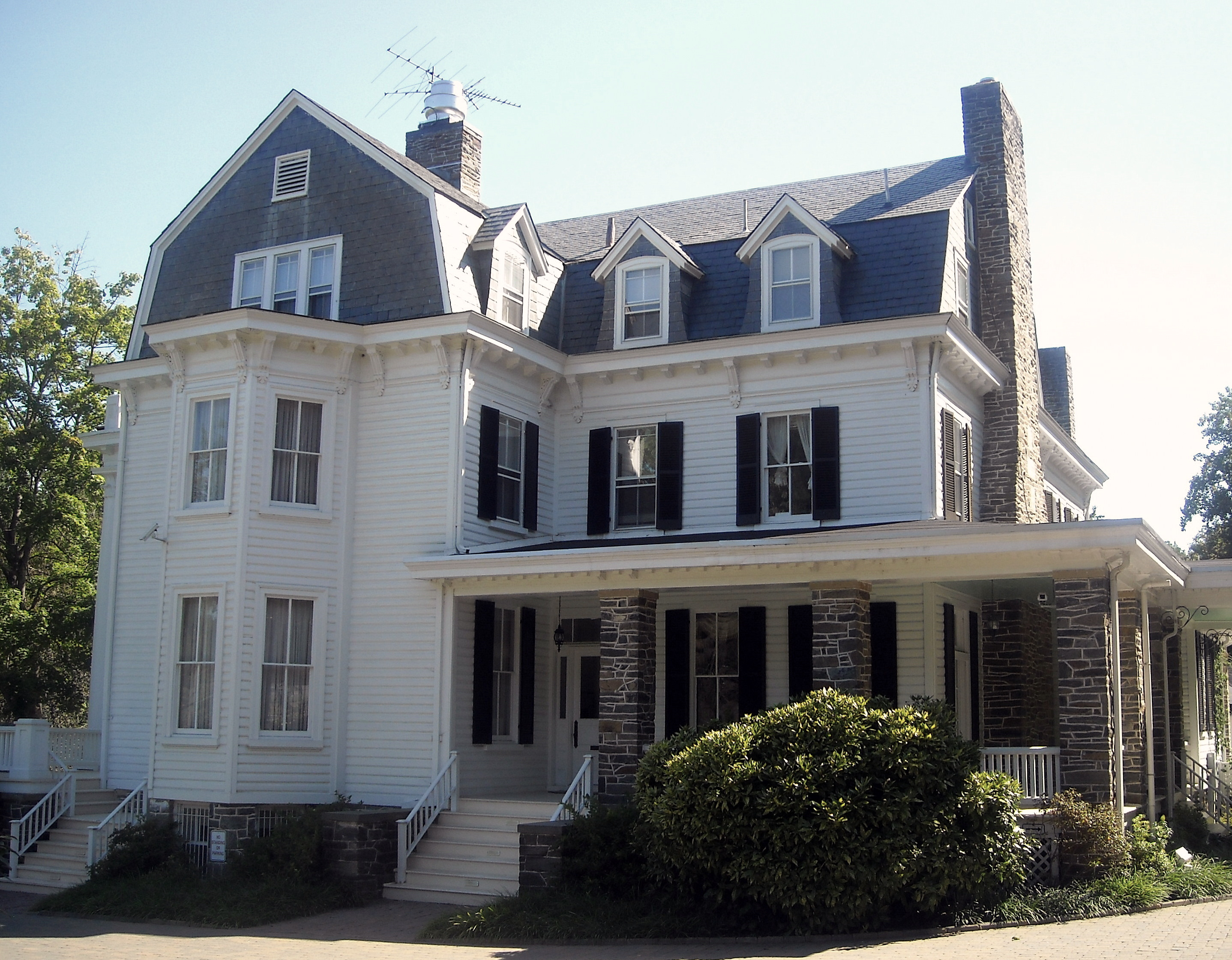
Cloverdale, now seat of the embassy's Education Office

== See also ==
- List of ambassadors of China to the United States
- List of diplomatic missions of China
- United States Embassy in Beijing
