= Amending the Height of Buildings Act of 1910 =

- Long title: To amend the Act entitled An Act to regulate the height of buildings in the District of Columbia to clarify the rules of the District of Columbia regarding human occupancy of penthouses above the top story of the building upon which the penthouse is placed.
- Announced in: the 113th United States Congress
- Sponsored by: Rep. Darrell E. Issa (R, CA-49)
- Number of co-sponsors: 1

Citations
- Public law: Pub. L. 113–103 (text) (PDF)

Legislative history
- Introduced in the House as H.R. 4192 by Rep. Darrell E. Issa (R, CA-49) on March 11, 2014; Committee consideration by United States House Committee on Oversight and Government Reform; Passed the House on April 28, 2014 (Roll Call Vote 178: 367-16); Passed the Senate on May 6, 2014 (unanimous consent); Signed into law by President Barack Obama on May 16, 2014

Pub. L. 113–103 (text) (PDF) (H.R. 4192), officially titled To amend the Act entitled An Act to regulate the height of buildings in the District of Columbia to clarify the rules of the District of Columbia regarding human occupancy of penthouses above the top story of the building upon which the penthouse is placed, is a United States Public Law that amends the Height of Buildings Act of 1910 in order to allow some penthouses to be built on the tops of buildings in District of Columbia.

== Background ==
Current DC code allow things like air conditioners to be up to 18.6 feet taller than the roof of the building they are on. This bill would increase the height limit to 20 feet, tall enough to allow structures that humans can inhabit. The United States Congress started limiting the height of all buildings in DC in 1899. These height restrictions allow major monuments to be visible from a distance.

The change made by the bill was recommended by a study conducted by the National Capital Planning Commission and the D.C. Office of Planning.

== Provisions of the bill ==
This summary is based largely on the summary provided by the Congressional Research Service, a public domain source.

The bill would amend the District of Columbia Code to permit the construction or use for human occupancy of a penthouse which is erected to a height of one story of 20 feet or less above the level of the roof of the building upon which the penthouse is placed.

== Congressional Budget Office report ==
This summary is based largely on the summary provided by the Congressional Budget Office, as ordered reported by the House Committee on Oversight and Government Reform on March 12, 2014. This is a public domain source.

The Congressional Budget Office (CBO) estimates that enacting H.R. 4192 would have no effect on the federal budget. The legislation would amend the Height of Buildings Act of 1910, which limits the height of buildings in District of Columbia The legislation would allow human occupancy of certain building penthouses that are currently limited to mechanical uses (such as climate control or elevators). Enacting the bill would not affect direct spending or revenues; therefore, pay-as-you-go procedures do not apply.

H.R. 4192 contains no intergovernmental or private-sector mandates as defined in the Unfunded Mandates Reform Act and would impose no costs on state, local, or tribal governments.

== Procedural history ==
The bill H.R. 4192 was introduced into the United States House of Representatives on March 11, 2014 by Rep. Darrell E. Issa (R, CA-49). It was referred to the United States House Committee on Oversight and Government Reform. The bill passed in the House on April 28, 2014 in Roll Call Vote 178 by a vote of 367-16. On May 6, 2014, the United States Senate voted with unanimous consent to pass the bill. President Barack Obama signed the bill into law on May 16, 2014.

== Debate and discussion ==
D.C.'s delegate to Congress, Eleanor Holmes Norton (D) supported this bill, saying that "this bill is not a mandate directing the city to make any changes to penthouses or to its existing comprehensive plan or local zoning laws more generally."

Rep. Darrell Issa (R-CA) said that he favored the bill, acknowledging that "the District of Columbia has a unique visual requirement. We should not, cannot and will not obstruct the Mall and major parts of this historic city," but argued that this bill would not disrupt the skyline.

D.C. Mayor Vincent C. Gray was in favor of having greater options for building penthouses.

== See also ==
- List of bills in the 113th United States Congress
- List of tallest buildings in Washington, D.C.
- Height of Buildings Act of 1899
- Height of Buildings Act of 1910
