= Schneider Row Houses =

Historic house in Washington, D.C., United States

- U.S. Historic district – Contributing property
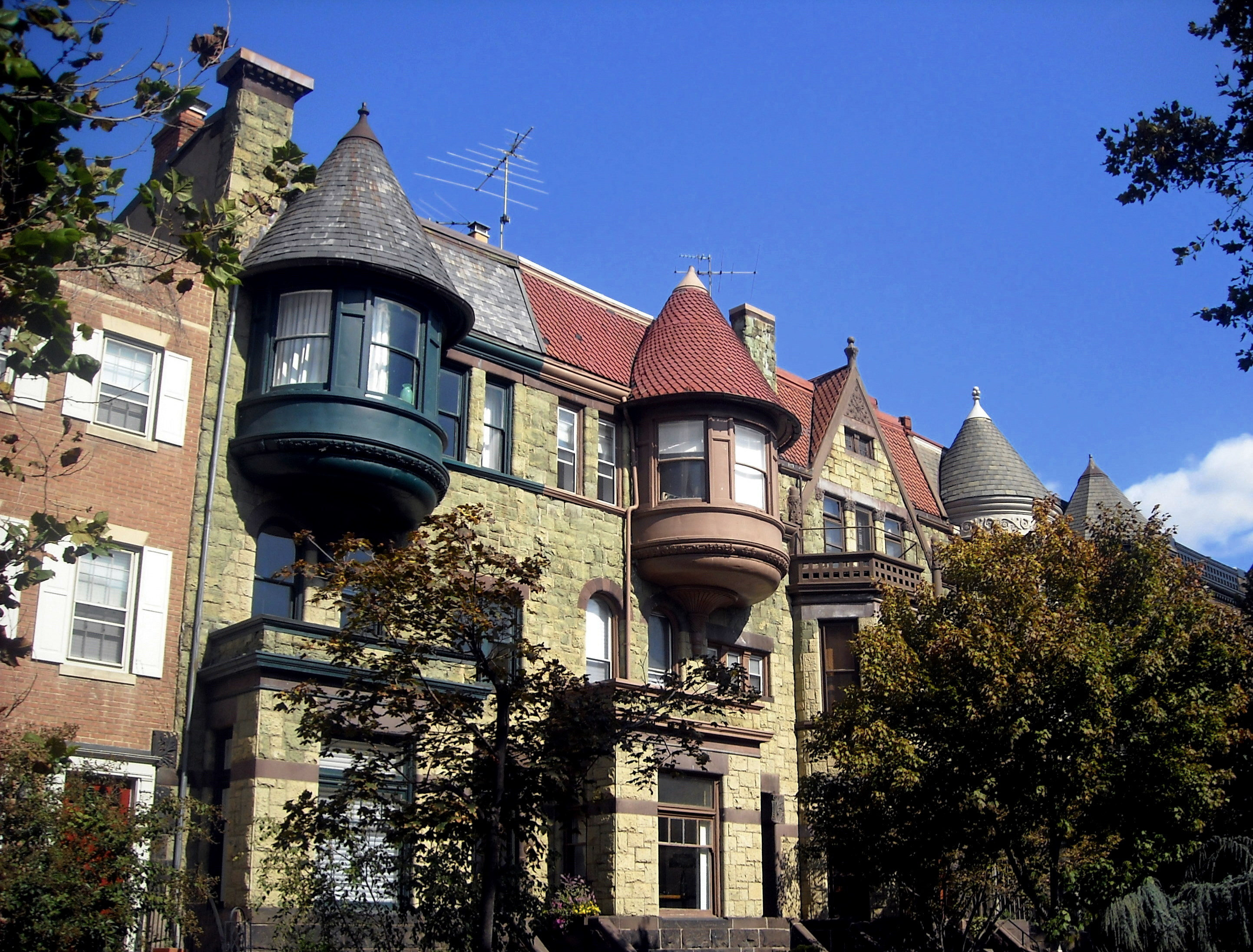
- 1700 block of Q Street
- Part of: Dupont Circle Historic District (ID78003056)

Significant dates
- Added to NRHP: July 21, 1978
- Boundary increases: February 6, 1985; June 10, 2005

The Schneider Row Houses are the row houses built between 1889 and 1892 on the north and south sides of the 1700 block of Q Street NW in Washington, D.C.

They were built by architect Thomas Franklin Schneider (1859-1938), who designed about 2,000 buildings in the area, including the Cairo Apartment Building one block to the east. Schneider paid $175,000 for the land on the north side of the street and developed the entire block at once.

The houses are part of the Dupont Circle Historic District as listed on the National Register of Historic Places.
