= Height restriction laws =

Laws that restrict the maximum height of structures

Height restriction laws are laws that restrict the maximum height of structures. There are a variety of reasons for these measures. Some restrictions serve aesthetic values, such as blending in with other housing and not obscuring important landmarks. Other restrictions may serve a practical purpose, such as height restrictions around airports for flight safety. Height restriction laws for housing have become a source of contention by restricting housing supply, increasing housing costs, and depressing land values.

== Asia ==
=== China ===
New building regulations that came in force in 2020, limited the height of buildings on cities depending on population in China. Cities with less than 3 million population cannot have structures rising above 250 m (820 ft); cities with populations greater than 3 million can have buildings up to a height of 500 m (1,600 ft).

Buildings are capped at 400 m (1,300 ft) on the Shenzhen Bay area due to its proximity to Shenzhen Bao'an International Airport. A similar height restriction also applies in Wuhan, with buildings limited to 476 m (1,562 ft) on its central areas due to runway approaches paths to Wuhan Tianhe International Airport crossing it.

=== Malaysia ===
Buildings in the Petaling Jaya suburb of Kelana Jaya were previously capped at 15 floors (around 50–60 m (160–200 ft) in height) because of the close proximity to Subang International Airport, less than 5 km (3.1 mi) away. The height restriction was lifted in 1998 when commercial jet operations were relocated to the Kuala Lumpur International Airport in Sepang, and this saw higher buildings being erected, notably the 33-floor Ascent and New World Hotel towers at Paradigm Mall (the tallest in the area today, with heights of around 150 m (490 ft)).

=== Middle East ===
Israel and Jordan inherited laws from the days of the British Mandate that prevent buildings from rising more than four stories above the ground except by special government permission. In Amman, these regulations have been credited with maintaining the city's architectural and urban heritage, but have also been accused of inflating housing prices and causing unsustainable urban sprawl.

=== Myanmar ===
Most of the tallest buildings are located in Yangon where zoning regulations restrict the maximum height of buildings to 127 m (417 ft) above sea level, in order to prevent buildings from overtaking the Shwedagon Pagoda. The first ever attempt to build a skyscraper in the country—a 195 m (640 ft) tower in downtown Yangon faced intense opposition by local conservationists and was cancelled in 2014.

=== Philippines ===
A structural height restriction applies to buildings within Intramuros, Manila, where most structures cannot be higher than 30 m (98 ft) from street level, and towers cannot exceed 35 m (115 ft).

Davao City's zoning ordinance as of 2019 imposes a height restriction on buildings in its central area due to its proximity to Francisco Bangoy International Airport, with buildings not allowed to exceed 100 m (330 ft) above mean sea level.

=== Hong Kong ===
To protect the ridge line along Hong Kong Island and in Kowloon, height restrictions are imposed according to the location of the buildings or structures.

Prior to the 1998 closure of the Kai Tak Airport, many places in Kowloon had a stricter building height restriction due to its proximity to the airport.

=== Indonesia ===
In Bali, Indonesia, a building cannot be taller than a coconut tree, which is about 15 m (49 ft). The only building that is higher than a coconut tree is the Bali Beach Hotel because the hotel was built before the height restriction was announced. The restriction was enforced by a regional regulation, however, how much this is enforced is in question.

=== Singapore ===
Buildings in Raffles Place, Marina Centre, Marina Bay Sands, Bugis and Kallang have height restrictions of up to 280 m (920 ft) because of the proximity of Paya Lebar Air Base until 2030 as planned.

== Europe ==
In Europe, there is no official general law restricting the height of structures. There are however height restriction laws in many cities, often aimed to protect historic skylines.

In Athens, buildings are not allowed to surpass twelve floors so as not to block views of the Parthenon. There are several exceptions though, such as the Athens Tower, the Atrina center and the OTE central building which all exceed that level. This is due to them either being built far away from the centre, or to the fact that they were constructed during periods of political instability. The city's tallest structure is the Athens Tower, reaching 103 m (338 ft) and comprising 25 floors.

In the central area of Rome, delimited by the Aurelian Walls, no building can exceed the height of the dome of St. Peter's Basilica (136 m (446 ft)). A skyscraper called Torre Eurosky (Eurosky Tower), built in 2012 in EUR neighbourhood (outside the ban area) exceeds this limit being 155 m (509 ft) high.

There is however a height restriction for new onshore wind turbines in the European Union, which set their total height to 200 m (660 ft).

Many cities have or in the past had an unwritten rule that no building was to be higher than either city hall, the highest church steeple or some other important historic landmark. Sometimes this rule was even enshrined in law or political convention.

== North America ==
=== Canada ===
Canada has no national height restrictions, but many individual cities do have height restriction bylaws and building is restricted by the national aviation authority (Transport Canada) near airports. Some examples:

- Edmonton: Buildings in downtown Edmonton were limited to 150 m (490 ft) above ground level due to its proximity to Blatchford Field (City Centre Airport). The height restriction was lifted in 2013 with the airport's closure, and the first building in Edmonton to exceed 150 m, JW Marriott Edmonton Ice District & Residences was topped out in 2018 and opened in 2019.
- Hamilton: No buildings may exceed the height of the Niagara Escarpment, to preserve views of Lake Ontario from the Escarpment, and vice versa.
- Montreal: until the late 1920s, all buildings were limited to ten storeys. Currently buildings are limited to a height of 200 m (660 ft) and are subject to not contrasting the view of Mount Royal, the city's central green space, with the only exception being antennas and communication towers, that are allowed to reach 223 m (732 ft) above mean sea level. The downtown today possesses only one building exceeding 200 m, the 1000 de la Gauchetière tower, which was built as a special project in 1992.
- Ottawa-Gatineau: Until 1973, buildings in downtown Ottawa were limited to 45.5 m (149 ft) so that the Peace Tower, part of the parliament buildings, could dominate the skyline.
- Saskatoon: continues to limit building heights to a maximum of 76 m (249 ft) due to a flight path that bisects the downtown core, however, the recent proposal of a 90 to 100 m (300 to 330 ft) tower could potentially lead to the lifting of this height limit.
- Vancouver: maintains "view corridors" that protect views of the North Shore Mountains. It also has a density bank that allows developers to exceed maximum building height restrictions in exchange for preserving heritage buildings.
- Whitehorse: No buildings should be taller than four stories due to the nearby fault line. The Whitehorse Chamber of Commerce said that maintaining the height restriction of four stories would discourage businesses from coming to the city. In 2007, the city rejected the proposal to increase the height limit to eight stories. In order to exceed height limit, the developer would have to apply for an amendment to the city's official community plan.

=== United States ===
Both the U.S. Federal Aviation Administration (FAA) and the Federal Communications Commission (FCC) have a rebuttable presumption not to build any antennae over 2,000 ft (610 m) above ground level. This is to prevent those structures from being a hazard to air navigation. In recent years, the FAA has requested that height limits within 10,000 ft (3,000 m) of an airport runway be lowered from 250 ft (76 m) to 160 ft (49 m), as development near airports has increased.

For airports, sometimes there are exceptions for height restrictions made for important infrastructure equipment, as radio towers or for structures older than the airport. These structures have to be marked with red and white paint, have flight safety lamps on top, or both. Often red and white paint and flight safety lamps have to be installed on high structures (taller than 100 m (330 ft)) far away from airports. Height restriction laws are not always kept strictly.

Several cities in the United States have local height limits, for example:

- Orlando, Florida: Due to Downtown Orlando's close proximity to Orlando Executive Airport, the maximum allowable height of buildings there is 450 ft (140 m).
- Bellevue, Washington: maximum of 450 ft (140 m) in Downtown Bellevue, set in the late 1990s.
- Madison, Wisconsin: No building located within 1 mile (1.6 km) of the Wisconsin State Capitol (its dome is 287 ft (87 m) high) may be higher than it (set in 1966).
- San Jose, California: Due to Downtown San Jose's close proximity to San Jose International Airport, no buildings within city limits surpass 300 ft (91 m).
- Portland, Oregon: Height limits vary between 75 and 460 ft (23 and 140 m) throughout the city, with the primary intent being to protect views of Mount Hood and the West Hills.
- Washington, DC: buildings are limited to a height equal to the width of the adjacent street plus 20 ft (6.1 m) up to a maximum of 90 ft (27 m) on residential streets, 130 ft (40 m) on commercial streets, and 160 ft (49 m) on a small portion of Pennsylvania Avenue. The height limit was passed by the United States Congress in 1889 as the Height of Buildings Act of 1899 and later amended by the Height of Buildings Act of 1910.
- Boston, Massachusetts: Due to the city's proximity to Logan International Airport, building height is restricted to around 800 ft (240 m). Furthermore, buildings in Downtown Boston are capped even lower than 700 ft (210 m). This is in order to prevent shadows from being cast on both significant historic landmarks and public parks, such as the Boston Common.
- Philadelphia, Pennsylvania: For many years, the city had a gentlemen's agreement not to build taller than the statue of William Penn that graced the Philadelphia City Hall. Philadelphia sports fans blamed the failure of their teams at the turn of the 21st century on the violation of this rule. The first building to exceed the height of City Hall was the Liberty One tower.
