= Schneider Triangle =

- U.S. National Register of Historic Places
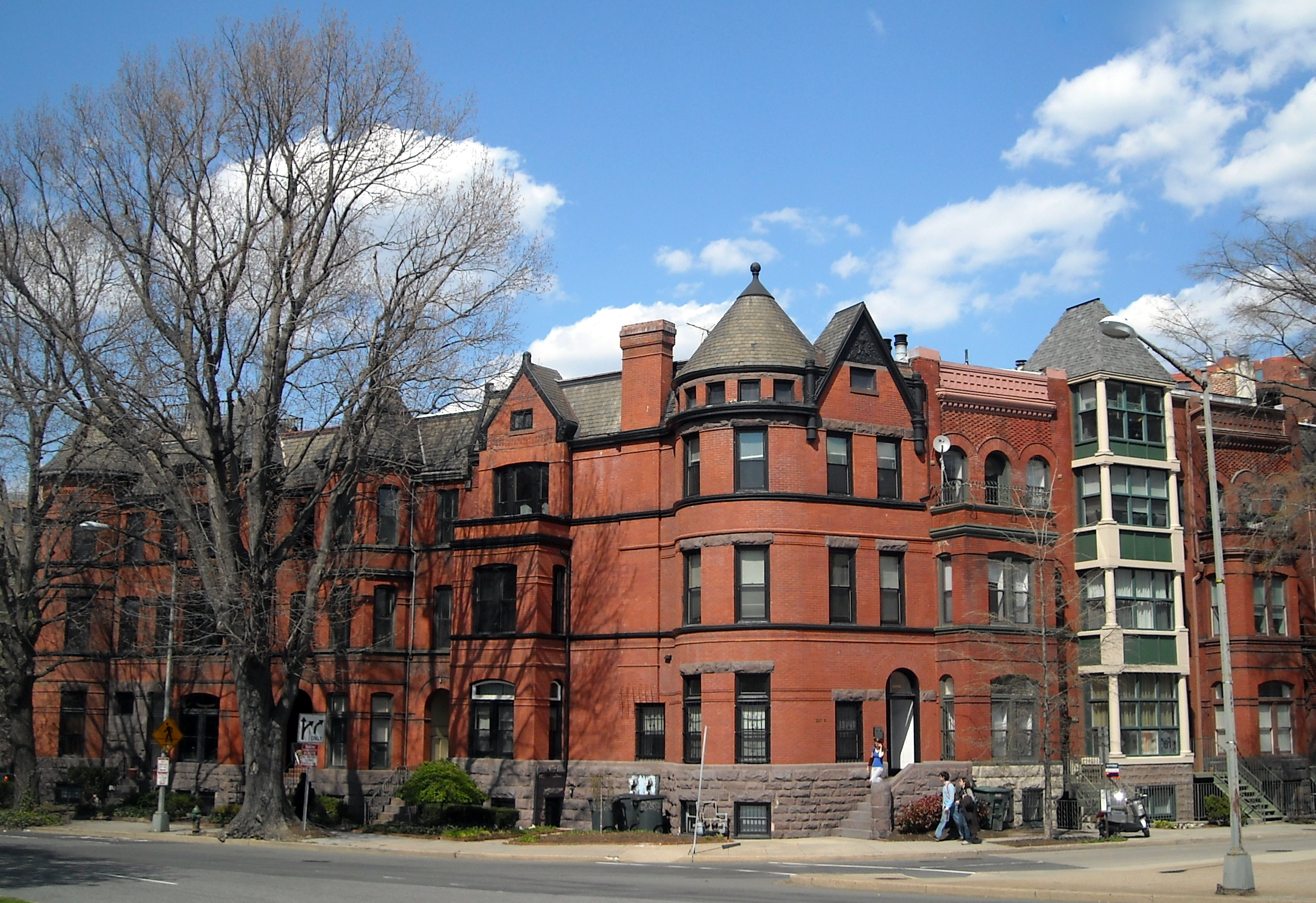

- Location within the District of Columbia Location within the United States
- Location: Bounded by Washington Circle, New Hampshire Ave. NW, K, 22nd, and L Sts. NW, Washington, District of Columbia
- Coordinates: 38°54′11″N 77°2′58″W
- Area: 0.4 acres (0.16 ha)
- Built: 1889
- Architect: Thomas F. Schneider
- Architectural style: Queen Anne, Romanesque
- NRHP reference No.: 82001031
- Added to NRHP: December 13, 1982

Schneider Triangle is a set of residential buildings designed and built by Thomas Franklin Schneider next to Washington Circle Park in Washington, DC. The twenty two buildings formed a complete block with a central courtyard. It was listed on the National Register of Historic Places in 1982, at which time, only 21 of the buildings remained standing. It forms a triangle due to the street layout of DC. The Embassy of Tajikistan is located in one of the houses.
