= Stewart's Castle =

Former mansion in Washington, D.C.

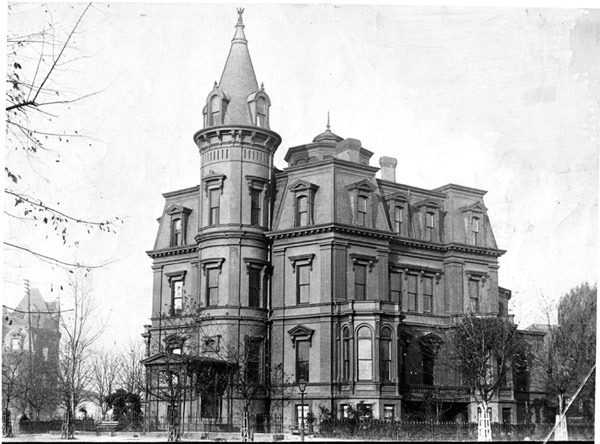
- Stewart's Castle

- Location within Washington, D.C.
- Alternative names: Stewart's Folly; Castle Stewart

General information
- Location: 1913 Massachusetts Ave NW, Washington DC 20036-1105, Washington, DC, United-States
- Coordinates: 38°54′37″N 77°02′39″W
- Completed: 1873
- Demolished: 1901
- Owner: Senator William Morris Stewart

Design and construction
- Architect: Adolf Cluss

Stewart's Castle, also referred to as Castle Stewart or Stewart's Folly, was a mansion in Washington, D.C., located on the north side of Dupont Circle between Connecticut Avenue and Massachusetts Avenue. The house owed its various names to the original owner, Senator William Morris Stewart, the imposing, turreted facade, and its prominence in an area considered undesirable at the time of its construction. Designed by architect Adolf Cluss, the house was completed in 1873 but only stood for 28 years. It was badly damaged in a fire in 1879 but later repaired and rented to the Chinese Legation from 1886 to 1893. The house was sold to Senator William A. Clark, who razed it in 1901, intending to build a new residence. The plans never came to fruition. The site remained vacant for over 20 years until the construction of a commercial building, which still stands.

== History ==
=== Development and construction ===
William Morris Stewart c. 1865–1875

Until the 1860s, much of the Dupont Circle neighborhood was still undeveloped marshland with only a few modest houses. The Board of Public Works (BPW) began large-scale improvements in parts of the city in 1871. The following year, Connecticut Avenue was paved from Lafayette Square to Boundary Street (present-day Florida Avenue) with trees flanking the roadway. The circle itself, named initially Pacific Circle in honor of the neighborhood's real estate developers, was improved with paths, fences, and landscaping. The developers, Nevada Senator William Morris Stewart (1827-1909), Curtis Justin Hillyer, and Thomas Sunderland, were wealthy lawyers who had made their fortunes with mining operations in California and Nevada. Their real estate business nicknames included the Pacific Pool, Pacific Syndicate and California Syndicate.

Hillyer and Sunderland encouraged Stewart to build a large house in Pacific Circle to spur further development and increase property values in the neighborhood. Despite financial difficulties that he was experiencing at the time, Stewart began plans for his house and selected architect Adolf Cluss (1825–1905) to design it. Cluss, a German immigrant, was the BPW architect at the time who designed many of the city's prominent buildings including the Arts and Industries Building, Center Market and the Franklin School. Construction lasted from 1871 to 1873 at an estimated cost of between $80,000 and $100,000. The design of the nearly 19,000 sq ft (1,800 m^{2}) house was influenced by the pentagonally shaped, 16,322 sq ft (1,516.4 m^{2}) lot on the north side of the arc of the circle between Connecticut Avenue and Massachusetts Avenue All of the house's furnishings were purchased in 1872 by Stewart's wife, Annie, daughter of Senator Henry S. Foote, during a visit to France. The first consignment of furnishings was lost at sea and an almost identical order was placed, which arrived safely.

=== Residence ===
There was mixed reaction upon completion of the five-story, Second Empire house, the first to be built on the circle and considered to be one of the most elaborate private residences in the city. Most people agreed it was an impressive mansion and nicknamed it Stewart's Castle or Castle Stewart because of its size, architectural details such as the imposing, turreted facade and its prominence on the circle. But it was also referred to as Stewart's Folly because at the time its location was far from desirable areas of the city and there were few houses in the neighborhood. Development in the neighborhood was minimal for several years due to the Long Depression, which began in 1873 and lasted until 1879. It would be seven years before another residence was built on the circle, the Hopkins-Miller House, completed in 1880 and located on the south side. The James G. Blaine Mansion, built in 1881, would be the next large residence built in the area.

The Stewarts spent most of their money on building and furnishing the house. Stewart had left the real estate syndicate. The upkeep of such a large house, including a stable with thoroughbred horses and paying many servants, was financially draining. Nevertheless, the Stewarts hosted large parties, and their house briefly became a center of Washington, D.C.'s social scene. According to one newspaper reporter, "attending a reception at Stewart's Castle makes one feel like Marco Polo at the Court of Kublai Khan." In 1874, the ornate British Legation was built one block south of the circle and the area became a more acceptable section of the city according to prominent members of society. That same year, William Sharon was vying for Stewart's Senate seat, and Stewart chose not to stand for reelection. After only two years in his new house and having exhausted most of his funds, in 1875, Stewart and his family moved back to California, where he resumed his law practice and mining operations. For the next four years, the only occupants were a few servants and a watchman.

==== 1879 fire ====
By 1879, Annie Stewart had grown tired of living in California and returned to their home in Washington, D.C. She made plans to host a New Year's Eve reception at Stewart's Castle, but on the night of December 30, while Annie was visiting friends, a fire broke out due to a defective flue. The fire department was telephoned, but the fire had spread from the front stairway to the top floors by the time firefighters arrived. Annie was notified and returned to find her house in flames. British minister Sir Edward Thornton and other diplomatic staff members hurried to the scene. He took Annie and her daughter, who had been asleep upstairs and was rescued by two servants, to the British Legation before returning to the house to assist with rescuing valuables and personal items. Many of the items from the first and second floors were saved, including paintings, furnishings, and silver. However, the upper floors were completely gutted, and the plaster and woodwork on the lower floors were heavily damaged. The estimated cost of the damage was $50,000. The house was abandoned and sat vacant until 1883 when Stewart hired architect Robert Isaac Fleming to oversee the necessary extensive repairs.

=== Chinese Legation ===
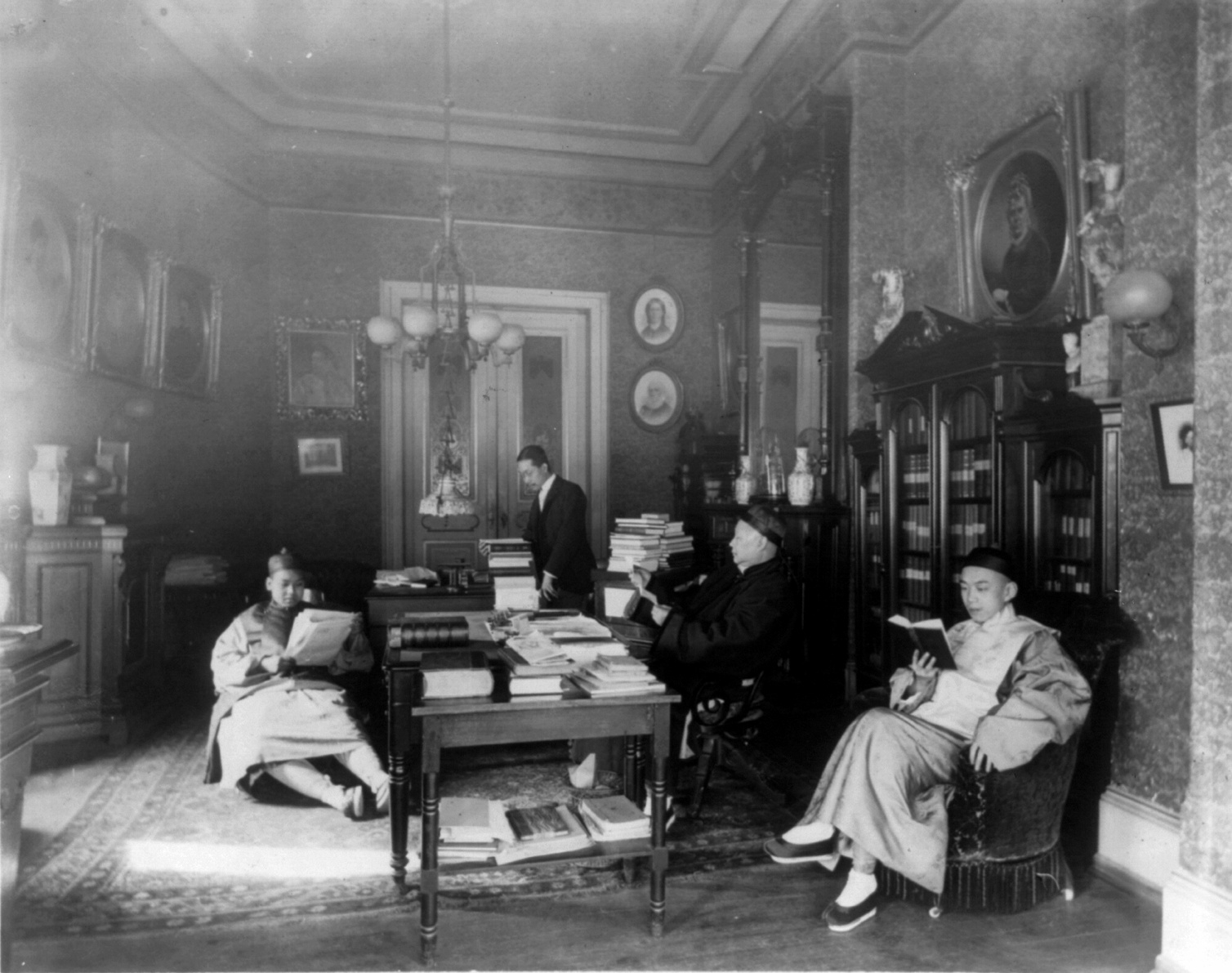
The Chinese minister and his diplomatic staff in Stewart's Castle

The Stewarts attempted to sell their house, but with no success. In 1886, they began renting Stewart's Castle, fully furnished, to the Chinese Legation for $10,000 a year. When Stewart was re-elected to the Senate in 1887, the family rented a house on H Street. Although Chinese diplomats had been in Washington, D.C. for several years, they still drew curious looks from locals. Nearby residents found the activities of the Chinese diplomatic corps to be peculiar, including staff doing laundry in what was now called Dupont Circle and playing hide-and-seek at night. When staff went out on Stewart's Castle's balconies, onlookers would stare, and police would eventually ask the public to move. Staff would sometimes use the large ballroom as a place to smoke opium.

An invitation to the Chinese Legation was coveted by members of society as the receptions were considered fashionable and unique. A local newspaper reported one such event: "Washington ladies are delighted to learn that some of their number have been received by the wife of the new Chinese Minister. She greeted them in her boudoir on the second floor of Stewart's Castle, toddling toward them on her three-inch-long bound feet, and clad in handsome silken robes of pink, lavender, and blue." A social event at the Chinese Legation in 1887 caused a scandal. A ball was held with 400 invitations issued. However, over 1,500 people made their way into the building resulting in the local press describing it as a "mob." Attendees were unable to move for hours, Chinese ornaments were broken or lost, guests lost their wraps and overcoats, and one senator was separated from his wife for over two hours after leaving to get her a refreshment.

The Chinese Legation continued renting Stewart's Castle until 1893 when Stewart was re-elected to the Senate. The Legation had caused significant damage to the building. Staff smoking opium left burned holes in the expensive furniture. Fish was cooked on the kitchen tile floors because the staff was unaccustomed to using stoves. There were smoke stains in the rooms because the minister would burn red peppers when he wanted guests to leave. Stewart sued the Chinese government for $15,000 for damages to the house. Chinese officials hired former Secretary of State John W. Foster to represent them in court. A settlement was reached in the amount of $3,000.

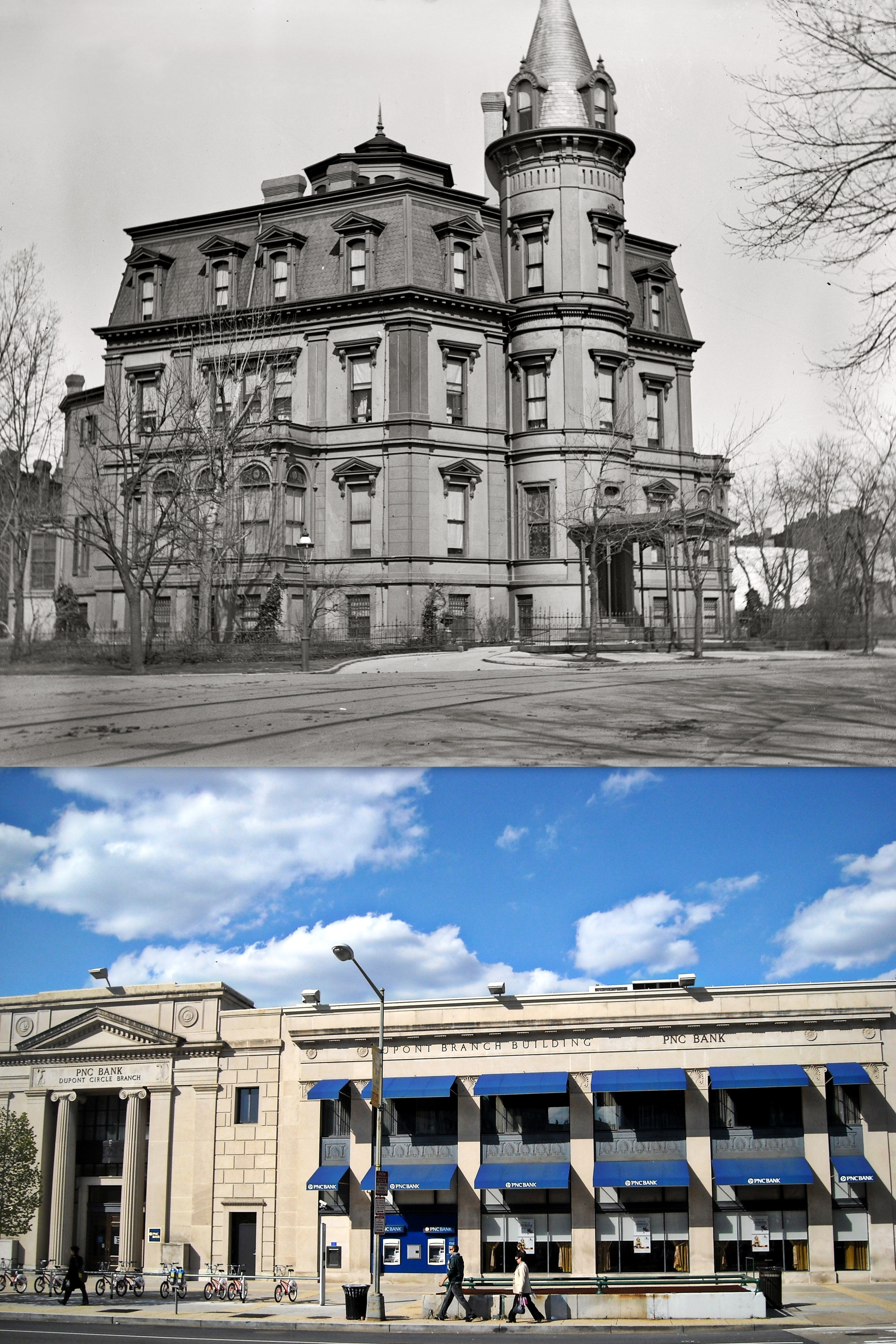
Stewart's Castle and PNC bank branch on the same lot over 100 years later

=== Restoration and final years ===
Stewart began a restoration of the house, including repainting and redecorating the interior, repainting the exterior, and repairing holes in the walls. Annie and her youngest daughter returned from an overseas trip with new furnishings. The family leased a house on Vermont Avenue until restorations were completed in late 1894. Upon completion of the renovations, Stewart's Castle returned to its role as a center of Washington, D.C. society.

The family continued living in the house until September 1899 when it was sold to wealthy Montana Senator William A. Clark for an estimated $145,000. Stewart purchased a new property at 1800 F Street NW. A few years after moving out of the house, in May of 1904, Stewart sold many of its furnishings at a G.C. Sloan & Company auction. This resulted in a widely publicized argument between him and his daughters. They claimed Stewart was heartless and cruel for selling the belongings of their mother, who had died in 1902. Stewart said his daughters had already taken all of the items they wanted, but were upset because he had recently remarried against their wishes. He also told his daughters "I need the money."

Initial plans for the Stewart Castle site were for a large apartment building or a twelve-story hotel to be erected on the lot. Still, Clark chose instead to build a large neoclassical residence. Clark became embroiled in a scandal when it was discovered he had bribed members of the Montana Legislature in return for their votes. The U.S. Senate refused to seat him, and Clark moved to New York. He never lived in Stewart's Castle but would occasionally allow charity functions to be held there. Clark was re-elected to the Senate in 1901, and Stewart's Castle was razed that year. He lived next door at 1915 Massachusetts Avenue NW (now demolished). He never built a residence in the city, instead focusing on building a Fifth Avenue mansion in New York.

For more than 20 years, the site where Stewart's Castle once stood remained a vacant lot overgrown with weeds. The only remnants of the once grand house were the foundation stones. In 1908, New York Avenue Presbyterian Church considered purchasing the lot to build a new, modern church building. Clark continued ownership of the empty lot until December 1921 when it was sold to the Semmes Motor Company for over $200,000. The company built an automobile showroom on a portion of the lot. In 1922, Riggs Bank (now PNC Financial Services) built a branch next to the showroom, which was later purchased by Riggs Bank and the two buildings were incorporated in 1923. In 1990, Riggs Bank announced it would tear down the branch and construct a 10-story, 100 ft (30 m) tall office building on the entire block, but opposition by neighborhood activists and historic preservationists derailed the project. In 2015, PNC sold the property to L&B Realty Advisors LLP for $60.75 million, but signed a 15-year lease to continue operating its banking branch. Other tenants have included AT&T, BGR and Sweetgreen.

== See also ==
- Henderson Castle, house in Meridian Hill demolished in 1949
- Leiter House, nearby Dupont Circle mansion demolished in 1947
