= The Cairo =

- Cairo Apartment Building
- U.S. National Register of Historic Places
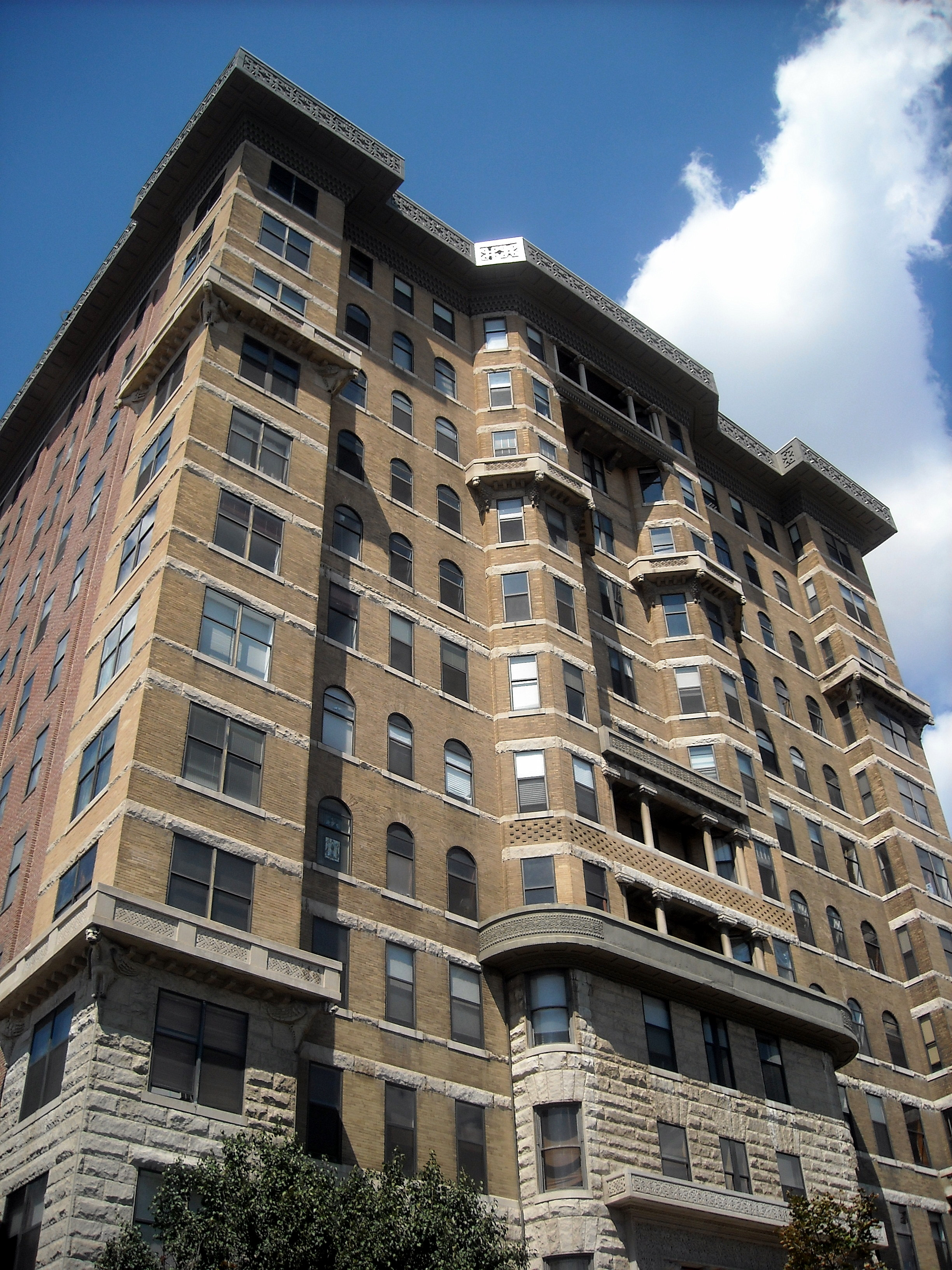

- Location within Washington, D.C.
- Location: Washington, D. C.
- Coordinates: 38°54′41″N 77°02′15″W
- Built: 1894; 132 years ago
- Architect: Thomas Franklin Schneider
- Architectural style: Moorish and Romanesque Revival
- NRHP reference No.: 94001033
- Added to NRHP: September 9, 1994

The Cairo apartment building, located at 1615 Q Street NW in Washington, D.C., is a landmark in the Dupont Circle neighborhood and the District of Columbia's tallest residential building. Designed by architect Thomas Franklin Schneider and completed in 1894 as the city's first "residential skyscraper", the 164-foot (50 m)-tall brick building spurred local regulations and federal legislation limiting building height in the city that continue to shape Washington's skyline.

Today, the Cairo is a condominium building, home to renters and owners of apartments ranging in size from small studios to multi-level two- and three-bedroom units.

== Appearance ==
The Egyptian theme of the building is stamped across its Moorish and Romanesque Revival features. Gargoyles perch high above the front entrance; some are winged griffins staring down from cornices, and others are more lighthearted. Along the first floor are elephant heads, which look left and right from the stone window sills of the front windows and which interlock trunks at the corners of the entrance arch. On the fourth floor are dragon and dwarf crosses. The carved stone façade hints at more exotic Middle Eastern origins.

The U-shaped building surrounds a Zen stone garden courtyard. The stone front steps lead up through a glass foyer into a marble-floored lobby with Egyptian columns and a lounge. A large mirror and photographs of the building's construction and other contemporary scenes adorn the lobby's eastern wall. Two square columns of red-orange marble anchor the space in front of two elevators, which serve the tenants of the 12 floors above. Between the elevators is a stairway that leads down through double glass doors into the central courtyard.

At the two interior southern corners are wide staircases of marble and wrought iron that span the height of the building. Some sections of hallways are marble-floored, and each apartment's outside door handle is a marble orb. Apartments have exposed red brick walls. The AIA Guide to the Architecture of Washington, D.C. summed up the design: "For all its quirks, the awkward tower reigns as one of Washington's guilty pleasures."

The Cairo's rooftop deck provides one of the most expansive views of the District's northwest skyline. Visible locations include the Washington National Cathedral, Georgetown, the Washington Monument, the Capitol, and The Catholic University of America.

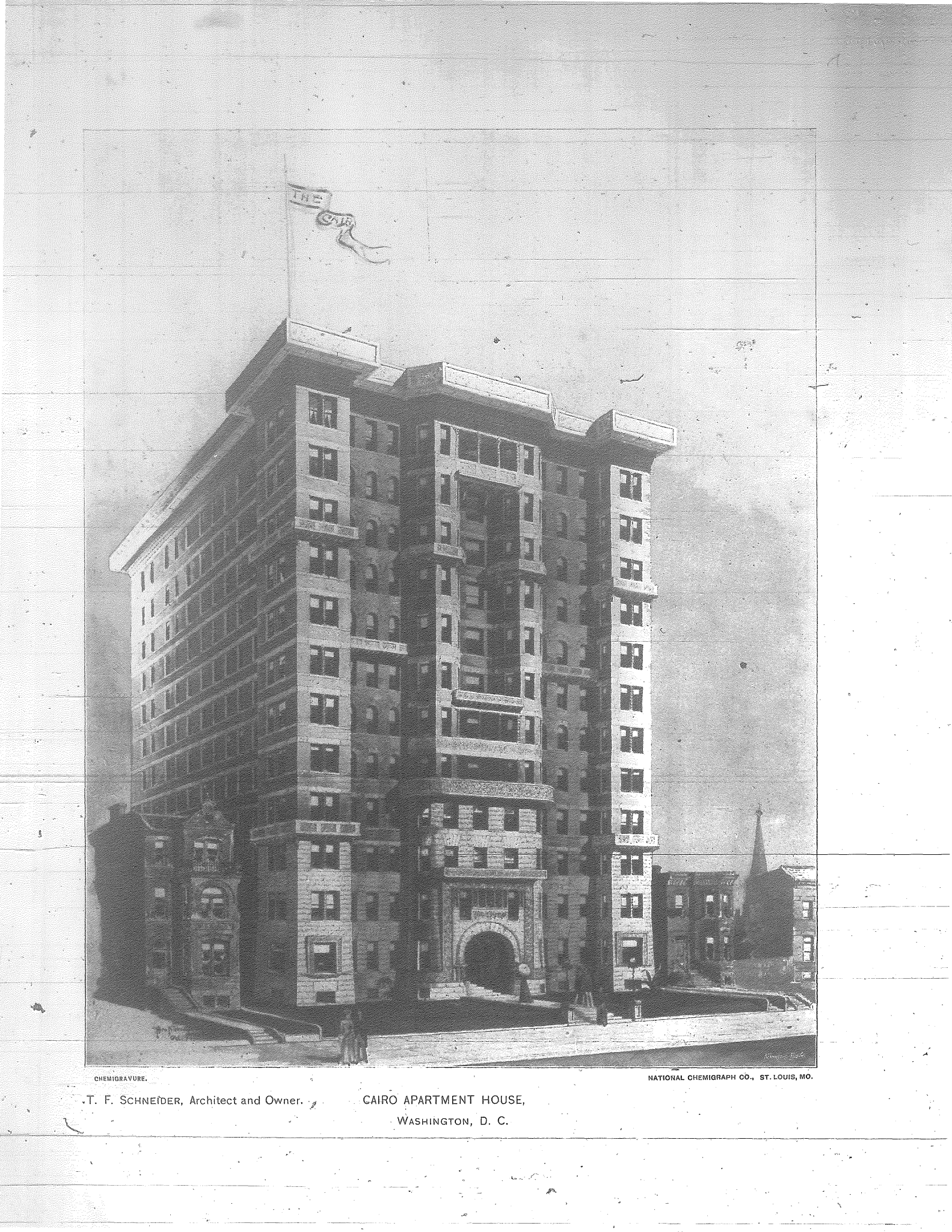
A rendering of the Cairo apartment building in DC

== History ==
At 12 floors, the Cairo towers above nearby buildings. At its opening in 1894, the building's height caused a tremendous uproar among local residents, who dubbed it "Schneider's Folly" and lobbied Congress to limit the height of residential buildings in the District of Columbia to prevent more skyscrapers from being built. The resulting Height of Buildings Act of 1899, and subsequent zoning laws, have restricted the heights of buildings in Washington, D.C..

Around 1900, the building was renamed the Cairo Hotel and became a center of D.C. society, with its ballroom frequently the center of social and political gatherings. Its guests and tenants have included F. Scott Fitzgerald, Thomas Edison, and other powerful political figures.

In early 1897, the deposed queen of Hawaii, Queen Liliuokalani, stayed in the Cairo while she lobbied President Grover Cleveland for compensation for the U.S. overthrow of the Hawaiian Kingdom in January 1893. On February 15, 1905, the Cairo swirled with intrigue when, during a labor union strike, painter J. Frank Hanby fell to his death when the ropes supporting him broke. The ropes were found possibly to have been cut by acid, leading to a grand jury investigation into the cause of death and many high-profile articles in The Washington Post. The high society of Washington often held meetings at the Cairo Hotel, such as that between the Woman's National Democratic League and a Congressman from New Mexico in 1913.

On June 16, 1906, Congressman Rufus E. Lester, Democrat of Georgia, died after an accident in which he fell through a skylight on the roof of the Cairo, where he resided. Lester went to the roof to look for his two young grandchildren and apparently missed his footing, and fell about 30 feet through the skylight, and landed on the building's eleventh floor. He broke both legs and sustained internal injuries which proved fatal.

The December 2, 1923 Washington Post contained an advertisement for the Cairo Hotel that read:

The CAIRO HOTEL. Absolutely Fireproof. A hotel which has demonstrated its value in years of service to a discriminating clientele. Retains with bath, per day Rooms with detached bath, per day Two-room suites, per day Three-room suites, per day & parties visiting the National Capitol and families desiring to make Washington their temporary or permanent home, the Cairo Hotel offers exceptional advantages of location and environment, construction and arrangement, equipment and management. - James T. Howard, Manager

In June 1940, a newspaper headline reported "Two Bandits Rob Cairo Hotel, Escape in Chase".

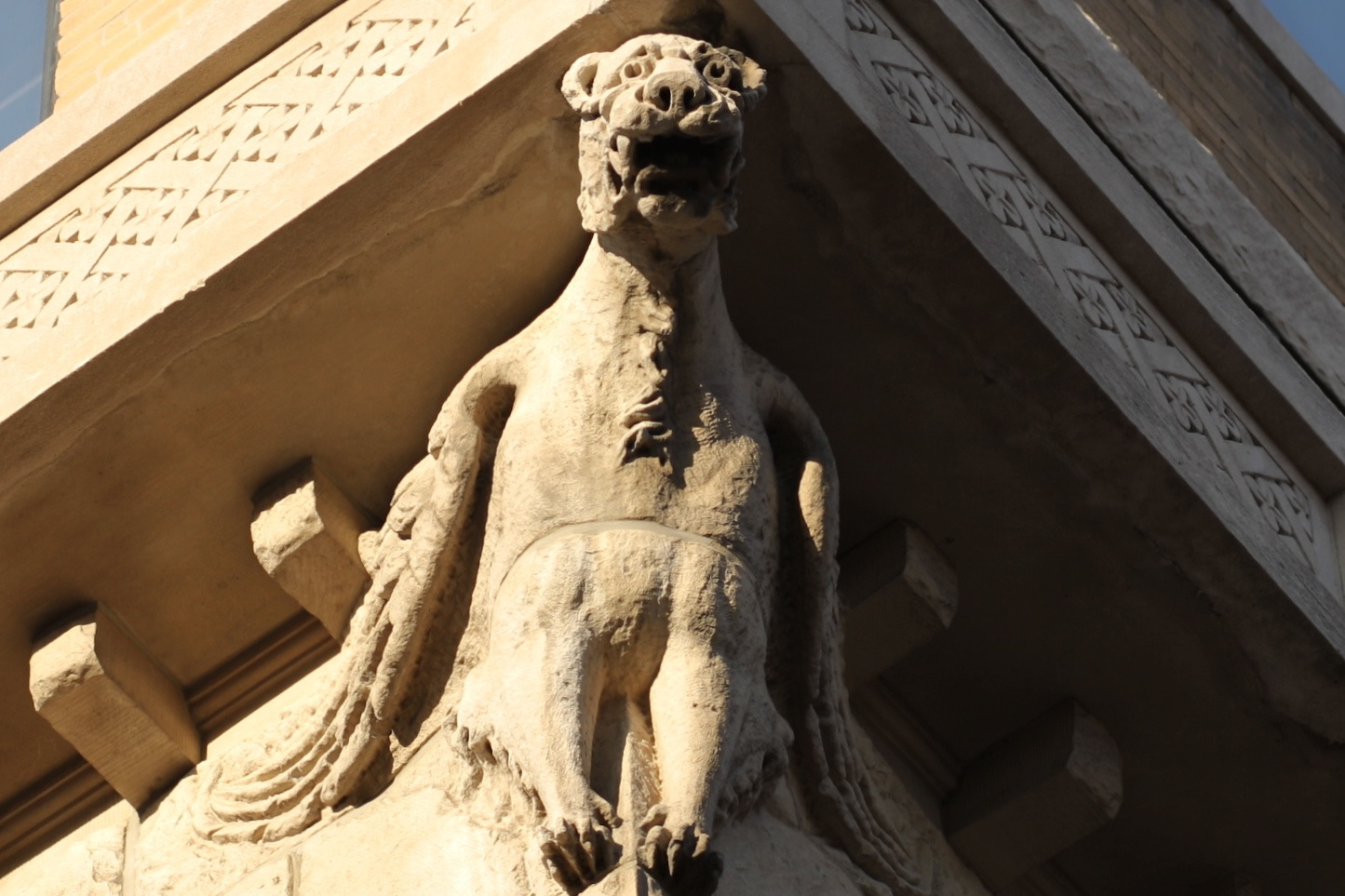
Gargoyle on the southwest corner of the Cairo

A party held on the night of November 30, 1940, featured 500 canaries singing beneath the chandeliers in the grand ballroom. The building also had a bowling alley and a coffee shop.

In 1954, the Cairo Hotel hosted Sunday mambo parties, played by Buddy Rowell and promoted by Maurice Gervitsch, known as "Groggy". The dances were featured a 12-piece band, and (in segregated 1950s D.C.) had mainly white and Jewish attendance. These glamorous and sensational days lasted into the late 1950s.

The building was sold in 1957 as a 267-room hotel, and on October 12 the new owners announced plans to spend $100,000 refurbishing the structure. In 1958, a fire caused by an electrical short-circuit on the sixth floor led to $25,000 worth of damage, but no structural problems.

The Cairo began to decline during the 1960s, when it was inhabited by squatters, prostitutes, drug addicts, student protesters, criminals, and even feral dogs. In June 1964, the FBI tracked a 24-year-old escaped convict to the building.

In 1966, the D.C. Department of Health considered leasing the run-down building for use as a rehabilitation center for alcoholics. After a series of failed attempts at renovation, including a closure on August 7, 1972, the building was restored in 1974 under the leadership of architect Arthur Cotton Moore. It was converted into condominiums in 1979.

At the building's centennial celebration in October 1994, Ross Elementary school students sang "Happy Birthday" to the building in thanks for a $1,000 donation made by the Cairo Condominium Unit Owners Association. Ward 2 Council member Jack Evans read a proclamation declaring it "Cairo Day" in DC. Of the building, he said, "It is a real monument in the area."

=== 21st century ===
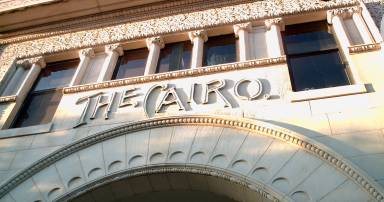

On May 29, 2007, a fire emptied the Cairo of its roughly 400 residents. At least nine emergency vehicles responded to the blaze. The fire heavily damaged one of the central units of the tenth floor. Firewalls prevented its spread, although some other units suffered water damage.

The building was repointed between 2007 and 2009, a $2.1 million project funded by the condominium owners, who paid fees ranging from $7,980 to more than $25,000, depending on the size of their apartments.

In summer 2010, the lobby's years-old carpet was pulled up, exposing the original terrazzo flooring for restoration. It revealed echoes of the façade's middle-eastern theme, with sandy hues and an interlocking tile pattern.
