= Thomas Franklin Schneider =

American architect (1859–1938)

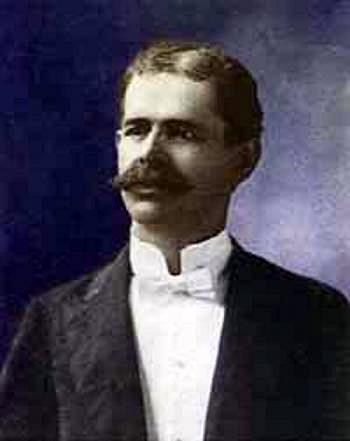
- Born: 1859; Washington, D.C.
- Died: 1938 (aged 78–79)
- Occupation: Architect

Thomas Franklin Schneider (born 1859 in Washington, D.C. — d. 1938) was an American architect who designed about 2,000 houses in the capital city area.

Among his important buildings are the Cairo Apartment Building, The Forest Inn, the Rochambeau, the Stoneleigh Court, the Ethelhurst, and his own private home, the Schneider House.

Schneider's parents were printers who moved from Germany to Washington, D.C., in 1830. After high school, Schneider worked for the architectural firm of Adolf Cluss and Schultze. While there, he worked on the construction of the Arts and Industries Building. He opened his own firm at age 24 and by 30 had designed The Cairo and The Forest Inn.

Schneider also created the city's first bus company.

== Buildings by Schneider ==
Name	Address (Washington, DC, unless noted)	Date	Built for	Current use	Image
12 Logan Circle	12 Logan Circle, NW				
1527 New Hampshire Avenue	1527 New Hampshire Avenue, NW	1889	Benjamin West Blanchard	American Political Science Association headquarters, Pi Sigma Alpha headquarters, and Phi Beta Delta Society Executive Office	
900 block of T Street, NW					
900 block of Westminster Street, NW		1893			
The Albemarle	1830 17th Street, NW	1900			
W. Taylor Birch House	3099 Q Street, NW	1890			
Cairo Apartment Building	1615 Q Street NW	1894		Condominium	
Alfred S. Gillett House	1614 20th Street NW	1893	Alfred Gillett, insurance magnate	Home of the Association of American Law Schools	
Inn at Forest Glen	9610 Dewitt Drive, Silver Spring, MD	1887	Forest Glen Improvement Company	Condominium/Apartments	
The Iowa	1325 13th Street, NW	1901		Condominium	
Moses House	2129 Wyoming Avenue, NW	1893	businessman W.H. Moses	Embassy of the Republic of Macedonia in Washington, D.C.	
Panama Legation	Intersection of New Hampshire Avenue, 18th Street, and Q Street, NW			Demolished	
Schneider Mansion	18th & Q Streets, NW	1891	Own use	Demolished 1958	
Schneider Row Houses	1700 block of Q Street, NW	1889-92	Self		
Schneider Triangle	Bounded by Washington Circle, New Hampshire Ave. NW, K, 22nd, and L Sts. NW	1889	John W. Paine		
John Paine Mansion (AKA The Castle)	49 2nd Street, Troy NY	1894	John Paine	Paine Castle Inc. Not for Profit	PKPCastle
The Ethelhurst	1012 15th Street NW	1903		The Architect Hotel	
