= Height of Buildings Act of 1899 =

US federal law for Washington, DC

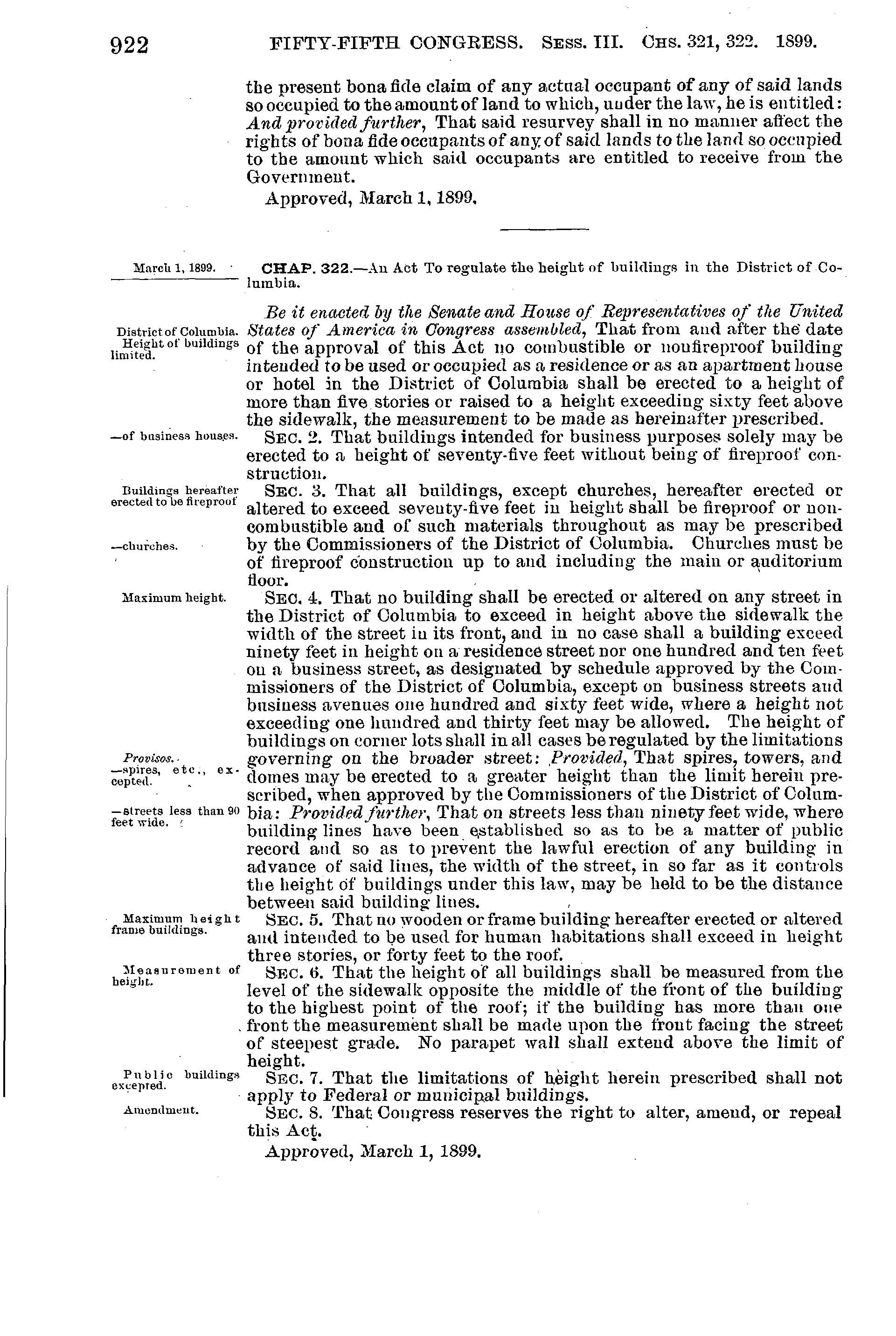
The Height of Buildings Act of 1899 (National Archives and Records Administration)

The Height of Buildings Act of 1899 was a U.S. height restriction law passed by the 55th Congress in response to advancements in construction technology, specifically the use of iron and steel frames, along with thin veneer facades, which made it possible to build lighter, and consequently much taller buildings. Residents of densely populated cities, including Washington D.C., felt that the new technology was untested and steel-framed structures may suffer "serious and fatal defects" due to corrosion from steam pipes and electrical wiring – another relatively recent advancement. They believed that these new tall buildings would ultimately collapse. In an 1899 Senatorial Report, Senator Warren Curtis speculated that "the life of these structures might not be more than seventy-five years."

Another concern was the difficulty of extinguishing fires in the upper floors of tall buildings. At the time, firefighting equipment had been designed to fight flames primarily in low-rise buildings. The growing popularity of skyscrapers presented a new fire hazard. In his report, Senator Curtis wrote that, "It would seem that the fire chiefs in the large cities who have had experience with high buildings are agreed that it is absolutely impossible for them to successfully fight flames over 85 feet (26 m) above the ground with the fire apparatus now manufactured, as the pressure is so great that no hose now made can stand the strain and the men are unable to handle the hose."

In response to these concerns, on March 1, 1899, United States Congress approved the Act to Regulate the Height of Buildings in the District of Columbia, more commonly referred to as the Height of Buildings Act of 1899. The law limited the heights of new buildings based on building use and type of construction:

Be it enacted by the Senate and House of Representatives of the United States Of America in Congress assembled,

SEC. 1. That from and after the date of the approval of this Act no combustible or nonfireproof building intended to be used or occupied as a residence or as an apartment house or hotel in the District of Columbia shall be erected to a height of more than five stories or raised to a height exceeding sixty feet [18.2 m] above the sidewalk, the measurement to be made as hereinafter prescribed.

SEC. 2. That buildings intended for business purposes solely may be erected to a height of seventy-five feet [22.86 m] without being of fireproof construction.

SEC. 3. That all buildings, except churches, hereafter erected or altered to exceed seventy-five feet [22.86 m] in height shall be fireproof or noncombustible and of such materials throughout as may be prescribed by the Commissioners of the District of Columbia. Churches must be of fireproof construction up to and including the main or auditorium floor.

SEC. 4. That no building shall be erected or altered on any street in the District of Columbia to exceed in height above the sidewalk the width of the street in its front, and in no case shall a building exceed ninety feet in height on a residence street nor one hundred and ten feet [33.5 m] on a business street, as designated by schedule approved by the Commissioners of the District of Columbia, except on business streets and business avenues one hundred and sixty feet wide, where a height not exceeding one hundred and thirty feet [39.6 m] may be allowed. The height of buildings on corner lots shall in all cases be regulated by the limitations governing on the broader street: Provided That spires, towers, and domes may be erected to a greater height than the limit herein prescribed, when approved by the Commissioners of the District of Columbia: Provided further, That on streets less than ninety feet [27.4 m] wide, where building lines have been established so as to be a matter of public record and so as to prevent the lawful erection of any building in advance of said lines, the width of the street, in so far as it controls the height of buildings under this law, may be held to be the distance between said building lines.

SEC. 5. That no wooden or frame building hereafter erected or altered and intended to be used for human habitations shall exceed in height three stories, or forty feet [12.1 m] to the roof.

SEC.6. That the height of all buildings shall be measured from the level of the sidewalk opposite the middle of the front of the building to the highest point of the roof; if the building has more than one front the measurement shall be made upon the front facing the street of steepest grade. No parapet wall shall extend above the limit of height.

SEC. 7. That the limitations of height herein prescribed shall not apply to Federal or municipal buildings.

SEC. 8. That Congress reserves the right to alter, amend, or repeal this Act.

— An Act to regulate height of buildings in the District of Columbia (1899), P.L. 55-322

The Height of Buildings Act of 1899 was later amended by the Height of Buildings Act of 1910.

Structural corrosion and limitations of inadequate firefighting equipment are less of a concern today than at the turn of the century, and many major U.S. cities updated their zoning laws to reflect advancements in building technology. For example, the 1961 New York City zoning resolution used a Floor Area Ratio, rather than a height restriction, and allowed for taller buildings when an adjacent public space was provided on the site. Yet, in Washington D.C. subsequent zoning laws followed the precedent set by the 1899 Act, and limited buildings to lower heights. As a result, the skyline of Washington D.C. lacks skyscrapers, and is much lower than that of other major U.S. cities.

== The height-of-the-Capitol-building myth ==
An urban myth holds that the buildings in Washington D.C. are currently, or were at one time, restricted to the height of the U.S. Capitol building. In fact, the 1899 law set the maximum height of any building to 130 feet (39.6 m), the height limit that firefighting equipment could effectively reach at the time, and not the 289 feet (88 m) of the Capitol building. Articles repeating the myth include one in The Washington Post in 2006, and one in The American Surveyor in 2012. A 2009 article suggested that the 1899 act "established that no building could be taller than the Capitol" but that the 1910 act further restricted heights to 20 feet above the width of the adjacent street.

The House of Representatives Report from December 1898, along with the Senate Report from the following year, show that when the bill to restrict the height of buildings was debated on the floor of Congress, no mention had been made of the U.S. Capitol building, or the height of its dome. None of the related House and Senate bills, or the Height Act itself made any mention of the Capitol building.

== Historical documents ==
- A Bill to regulate the height of residences in the city of Washington, H.R. 10430, 55th Congress, 2nd Session (May 23, 1898)
- A Bill to regulate the height of buildings in the District of Columbia, S. 4898, 55th Congress, 3rd Session (Dec. 7, 1898)
- House of Representatives Report 1704, 55th Congress, 3rd Session (Dec. 20, 1898)
- Senatorial Report 1532, 55th Congress, 3rd Session (Jan. 26, 1899)
- "The Height of Buildings Act of 1899" - An Act to regulate height of buildings in the District of Columbia (1899) P.L. 55-322
- "The McMillan Commission", Building Height Limitations: Staff Report for the Committee on the District of Columbia, House of Representatives, 94th Congress, 2nd Session (April 1, 1976)

== See also ==
- 1899 in the United States
- Building code
- History of construction
- History of firefighting
- History of Washington, D.C.
- Home Insurance Building
- List of fires in high-rise buildings
- McMillan Plan
- Washington Monument
