= Amy =

- Pronunciation: /ˈeɪmi/
- Gender: Female

Origin
- Languages: Old French; Latin
- Meaning: Beloved one or well-loved child

Other names
- See also: Amanda; Amelia; Amita; Aimee; Amélie; Amina; Amira

Amy is an English female given name. It is the English version of the French name Aimée, which means beloved. It was used as a diminutive of the Latin name Amata, a name derived from the passive participle of amare, "to love". The name has been in use in the Anglosphere since the Middle Ages. It was among the 50 most popular names for girls in England between 1538 and 1700. It was popularized in the 19th century in the Anglosphere by a character in Sir Walter Scott's 1821 novel Kenilworth, which was based on the story of Amy Robsart. Enslaved Black women in the United States prior to the American Civil War were more likely to bear the name than white American women because slave masters often chose their names from literary sources. The name declined in use after 1880 but was revived due to the hit song "Once in Love with Amy" from the 1948 Broadway musical Where's Charley?. The name peaked in usage in the United States between 1973 and 1976, when it was among the five most popular names for American girls. It remained among the top 250 names for American girls in the early 2020s.

== People ==
- Amy Acker (born 1976), American actress
- Amy Ackerman (born 2005), South African badminton player
- Amy Vera Ackman (1886–1966), Australian Sister of Charity and hospital administrator
- Amy Acton (born 1966), Governor-elect of Ohio
- Amy Acuff (born 1975), American track and field athlete
- Amy Adams (born 1974), American actress
- Amy Adams (politician) (born 1971), New Zealand politician
- Amy Hannah Adamson (1893–1963), Australian educator
- Amy Agulay (born 1978), Canadian field hockey player
- Amy Ahomiro (born 1992), New Zealand volleyball player
- Amy Ai, American psychologist
- Amy Aiken, American entrepreneur and winemaker
- Amy Alcott (born 1956), American professional golfer
- Amy L. Alexander (born 1963), American journalist
- Amy Alkon (born 1964), American writer
- Amy Allcock (born 1993), British sprinter
- Amy Allen (songwriter) (born 1992), American singer and songwriter
- Amy Allen (philosopher) (born 1970), American philosopher
- Amy Allen (actress) (born 1976), American actress and film crew member
- Amy Allison, American singer-songwriter
- Amy Alsop (born 1978), Canadian Paralympic goalball player
- Amy Alvarez (born 1977), Filipino politician
- Air Force Amy (born 1970), American female adult model and legal prostitute
- Curtis Amy (1927–2002), American jazz saxophonist
- Edward Amy (1918–2011), Canadian soldier
- George Amy (1903–1986), American film editor
- Gilbert Amy (born 1936), French composer and conductor
- Jean Barnabé Amy (1839–1907), French sculptor
- Miss Amy (born 1962), American singer-songwriter
- Sandra Amy (born 1992), Indian film and television actress
- Susie Amy (born 1981), English actress
- Teresa Amy (1950–2017), Uruguayan teacher, poet and translator
- William Lacey Amy (1877–1962), Canadian writer
- Amy Anderson (comedian) (born 1972), American comedian, actress, and writer
- Amy Andreotti, American biochemist
- Amy Andrew (born 1986), New Zealand boxer
- Amy Angert, American evolutionary biologist
- Amy Aniobi (born 1984), Nigerian-American writer and producer
- Amy Annelle, American folk musician
- Amy Applegren (1926–2011), American baseball player
- Amy Aquino (born 1957), American actress
- Amy Arata, American politician
- Amy Arbus (born 1954), American photographer
- Amy Archer-Gilligan (1868–1962), American serial killer
- Amy Argetsinger (born 1968), American writer
- Amy Arnell, American singer
- Amy Arnold (born 1974), British author
- Amy Arnsten (born 1954), American neuroscientist
- Amy Aronson (born 1962), American journalist
- Amy Ashworth (1924–2017), Dutch-American activist
- Amy Astley (born 1967), American magazine editor
- Amy Atkins, American journalist and academic
- Amy Atkinson (born 1989), American sprinter and middle distance runner
- Amy Atwater, American Author, Paleontologist and Science Communicator
- Amy Atwell (born 1998), Australian basketball player
- Amy Augarde (1868–1959), English actress and singer
- Amy T. Austin (born 1966), Argentine ecologist
- Amy Austria (born 1961), Filipino actress
- Amy Bach (born 1968), American writer
- Amy Garrett Badley (1862–1956), English educator, suffragist, school co-founder
- Amy M. Baggio (born 1973), American judge
- Amy Bagshaw (born 1988), British artistic gymnast
- Amy Bailey (educator) (1895–1990), Jamaican educator
- Amy Bailey (actress) (born 1975), American actress
- Amy Balkin (born 1967), American artist
- Amy Balliett (born 1982), American entrepreneur
- Amy Banarsie (born 2000), Surinamese footballer
- Amy Banse (born 1959), American business executive
- Amy Barbour-James (1906–1988), British-born Guyanese civil rights activist
- Amy Louise Barbour (1950–1950), American classical scholar
- Amy Barczuk (born 1990), American soccer player
- Amy Barger (born 1971), American astronomer
- Amy DuBois Barnett (born 1969), American magazine editor
- Amy Barr (born 1970), American planetary geophysicist
- Amy Coney Barrett (born 1972), US Supreme Court justice since 2020
- Amy Barrington (1858–1942), Irish teacher
- Amy M. Barrios, American chemist
- Amy Bartlett (1949–2004), American poet and poetry editor
- Amy Di Bartolomeo (born 1992), English musical theatre actress
- Amy Stokes Barton (1841–1900), American ophthalmologist
- Amy Baserga (born 2000), Swiss biathlete
- Amy Basken, American campaigner
- Amy Bastian (born 1968), American neuroscientist
- Amy Bauernschmidt (born 1970), United States Navy officer
- Amy Baxter (born 1967), American physician and inventor
- Amy Lynn Baxter (born 1967), American model & actress
- Amy Beach (1867–1944), American composer and pianist
- Amy Beattie (born 1980), Australian soccer player
- Amy Becher (born 1978), American curler
- Amy Yoder Begley (born 1978), American runner
- Amy Bell (1859–1920), British stockbroker
- Amy Belle (born 1981), Scottish singer
- Amy Morrin Bello, American politician
- Amy Bender (born 1965), American sports reporter and producer
- Amy Benjamin, American conspiracy theorist
- Amy Bentley (born 1962), American nutritional scientist
- Amy Benz (born 1962), American professional golfer
- Amy Berg (writer), American screenwriter
- Amy J. Berg (born 1970), American filmmaker
- Amy Bernardy (1880–1959), Italian journalist
- Amy Viranya Berry (born 1998), British-Thai model and beauty queen
- Amy Bessone (born 1970), American visual artist
- Amy Jane Best (1844–1932), Australian schoolmistress
- Amy Betz, American materials scientist
- Amy De Bhrún (born 1984), Irish actress
- Amy Biehl (1967–1993), American anti-apartheid activist, scholar, and murder victim
- Amy Bilquist (born 1997), American swimmer
- Amy Binsfeld (born 1976), American politician
- Amy Birnbaum (born 1975), American voice actress
- Amy Bix, American historian of technology
- Amy Black (mezzo-soprano) (1973–2009), British opera singer
- Amy Black (American singer) (born 1972), American singer-songwriter
- Amy Blackmore, Canadian impresario and artistic director
- Amy Blakemore (born 1958), American photographer
- Amy Ella Blanchard (1856–1926), American writer
- Amy Bloom (born 1953), American writer and psychotherapist
- Amy Bock (1859–1943), New Zealand con artist
- Amy Bockerstette (born 1998), American golfer and disability advocate
- Amy Boesky (born 1959), American writer
- Amy Bogaard (born 1972), Canadian archaeologist
- Amy Boleyn (died 1543), English noblewoman and courtier
- Amy L. Bondurant (born 1951), American diplomat
- Amy Bonté (born 1990), American rugby union player
- Amy Borkowsky, American author and comedian
- Amy Boulden (born 1993), Welsh golfer
- Amy Bourret (1962–2015), American attorney and author
- Amy Bower, American physical oceanographer
- Amy Bowtell (born 1993), Irish tennis player
- Amy Boyle-Carr (born 2001), Irish footballer
- Amy Bradley (politician), American politician
- Amy Morris Bradley (1823–1904), American educator
- Amy Brand (born 1962), American academic
- Amy Braunschweiger, American journalist
- Amy Braverman, American statistician
- Amy Brenneman (born 1964), American actress
- Amy Brierly (born 1989), British sitting volleyball player
- Amy Briggs (born 1962), American video game implementor
- Amy Woods Brinkley, American banker
- Amy Broadhurst (born 1997), British boxer
- Amy Brown (dietitian) (born 2000), Welsh dietitian
- Amy Brown (royal mistress) (1783–1876), Mistress of Charles Ferdinand, Duke of Berry
- Amy Katherine Browning (1881–1978), British artist
- Amy S. Bruckman (born 1965), American professor
- Amy Bruckner (born 1991), American attorney and former actress
- Amy Bruni (born 1976), American paranormal investigator & writer
- Amy Bull (1877–1953), British teacher & suffragist
- Amy Buller (1891–1974), British educator and writer
- Amy Bulley (1852–1939), English women's activist
- Amy Bunnage, Australian long-distance runner
- Amy Burk (born 1990), Canadian goalball player
- Amy Nelson Burnett (born 1957), American historian
- Amy Burvall, American educator
- Amy Busby (1872–1957), American actress
- Amy Butcher, American writer and essayist
- Amy Butler (minister), American Christian minister
- Amy Butler (designer) (born 1968), American textile designer
- Amy van Buuren (born 1969), Dutch tennis player
- Amy Gwendoline Caldwell (1910–1994), Australian pilot and air force officer
- Amy Callaghan (born 1992), Scottish politician, MP for East Dunbartonshire
- Laurel Amy Eva Campbell (1902–1971), New Zealand racehorse trainer
- Amy Campo, American practitioner of Brazilian jiu-jitsu
- Amy Carlson (born 1968), American actress
- Amy Carlson (religious leader) (1975–2021), American cult leader
- Amy Carmichael (1867–1951), Christian missionary to India
- Amy Caron (born 1984), American skateboarder
- Amy Carr (1991–2026), English footballer
- Amy Carter (born 1967), Daughter of Jimmy Carter
- Amy Carter (politician) (born 1970), American politician
- Amy Carter (netball) (born 1998), English international netball player
- Amy Cashin (born 1994), Australian athlete
- Amy Sterling Casil (born 1962), American science fiction writer
- Amy Matilda Cassey (1808–1856), African American abolitionist
- Amy Casson, British slalom canoeist
- Amy Castilla (1868–1898), Australian physician
- Amy Castle (born 1990), American actress
- Amy Castle (entomologist) (1880–1971), New Zealand entomologist and museum curator
- Amy Eliza Castles (1880–1951), Australian soprano
- Amy Catalano (born 1972), American racing driver
- Amy Catanzano (born 1971), American poet from Boulder, Colorado
- Amy Celico, American educator
- Amy Chan (badminton) (born 1961), Hong Kong badminton player
- Amy Chan, Hong Kong actress
- Amy Chaplin, Australian American chef and cookbook writer
- Amy Chapman (born 1987), Australian soccer player
- Amy Charity (born 1976), American racing cyclist
- Amy Charkowski (born 1971), American plant pathologist
- Amy Marie Charles (1922–1985), American academic
- Amy Cheng (born 1970), Singaporean actress
- Amy Cheng (visual artist) (born 1956), Taiwanese-American visual artist
- Amy Cheung (writer) (born 1967), Hong Kong writer
- Amy Cheung (artist), Hong Kong artist
- Amy Childress (born 1970), American civil and environmental engineer
- Amy Childs (born 1990), English television personality and model
- Amy Chow (born 1978), American artistic gymnast
- Amy Buckner Chowdhry, American entrepreneur, philanthropist, and UX research pioneer
- Amy Chozick (born 2000), American political reporter
- Amy Cardinal Christianson (born 1981), Métis fire scientist
- Amy Chu (born 1968), American comic book writer
- Amy Chua (born 1962), American law professor and writer
- Amy Cissé (born 1969), French basketball player
- Amy Clampitt (1920–1994), American writer
- Amy Ashmore Clark (1882–1954), American songwriter, composer and businesswoman
- Amy Clarke (1892–1980), English poet and writer
- Amy Clarke (musician) (born 1976), American singer-songwriter
- Amy J. Clarke, American metallurgist
- Amy Clay (born 1977), Australian rower
- Amy C. Clement, American climatologist
- Amy F. Cline (born 1974), American judge
- Amy Clipston, American romance fiction writer
- Amy Cogswell (1867–1958), American landscape architect, horticulturalist, and rosarian
- Amy Cohen-Corwin, American mathematician
- Amy Cohn, American operations researcher
- Amy Cokayne (born 1996), England international rugby union player
- Amy Coleridge (1864–1951), British actress
- Amy Fine Collins, American journalist, muse and author
- Amy Compton-Phillips (born 1963), American healthcare administrator
- Amy Connell, Scottish karateka
- Amy Connolly, American physicist
- Amy Conroy (born 1992), British wheelchair basketball player
- Amy Cook (born 1979), American musician
- Amy Corbett (born 1987), Scottish senior design manager
- Amy Corbishley (1889–1977), South African botanist
- Amy Bowers Cordalis (born 1980), Yurok attorney and conservationist from California
- Amy Correia (born 1968), American singer and songwriter
- Amy Corzine, American-born writer and poet
- Amy Costello (born 1998), Scottish field hockey player
- Amy Cotton (born 1980), Canadian Olympic judoka
- Amy Courter (born 1961), American Civil Air Patrol commander
- Amy Cozad (born 1991), American Olympic diver
- Amy Cragg (born 1984), American long-distance runner
- Amy Crawford (musician), American singer-songwriter
- Amy Cudden, British actress
- Amy Cuddy (born 1972), American psychologist
- Amy Cure (born 1992), Australian cyclist
- Amy Curlew (born 1998), Canadian ice hockey player
- Amy Curtis (1894–1970), Irish WRNS superintendent
- Amy Cutler (born 1974), American painter
- Amy Dafler Meaux, American priest
- Amy Dalby (1888–1969), British actress
- Amy Davidson (born 1979), American actress
- Amy Denson (born 1984), American basketball player
- Amy Deasismont (born 1992), Swedish singer
- Amy Dowden (born 1990), Welsh dancer
- Amy Dumas (born 1975), American singer, retired WWE professional wrestler
- Amy Eddy (born 1975), American judge
- Amy Sarr Fall, Senegalese magazine publisher
- Amy Fan (born 1971), Hong Kong–based actress
- Amy Farrington (born 1966), American actress and model
- Amy Fisher (born 1974), American criminal and cause célèbre
- Amy Fitzpatrick (born 1992, disappeared 2008), Irish girl who is missing
- Amy Flagg (1893–1965), British historian and photographer.
- Amy Garnett (born 1976), English rugby player
- Amy Gerstler (born 1956), American poet
- Amy Gillett (1976–2005), Australian rower and cyclist
- Amy Gleason (born 1971), American healthcare executive
- Amy Goodman (born 1957), American journalist
- Amy Grant (born 1960), American Christian contemporary pop singer
- Amy Graves, American physicist and physics educator
- Amy Gutierrez (born 1973), American sports journalist and writer
- Amy Hargreaves (born 1970), American actress
- Amy Harvey (born 2002), Japanese singer and model from the girl group XG
- Amy Heidemann, (born 1986), American rapper and singer known professionally as Qveen Herby
- Amy Beth Hayes (born 1982), British actress
- Amy Faye Hayes (born 1973), American ring announcer and model
- Amy Harris, Australian ballet dancer
- Amy Hastings (born 1976), track and field athlete
- Amy Heckerling (born 1954), American film director
- Amy Hempel (born 1951) American writer and journalist
- Amy Hennig (born 1964), video game director and script writer
- Amy Hill (born 1953), American actress
- Amy Holland (born 1953), American pop rock singer
- Amy Horrocks (1867–1919), English pianist and composer
- Amy Huberman (born 1979), Irish actress
- Amy Hunt (born 2002), British Olympic sprinter
- Amy Hurlston (1865–1949), British journalist and trade unionist
- Amy Irving (born 1953), American actress
- Amy Jackson (born 1992), English actress
- Amy Jackson (born 1987), Australian footballer
- Amy Johnson (1903–1941), English aviator
- Amy Jo Johnson (born 1970), American actress, singer-songwriter and musician
- Amy Klobuchar (born 1960), a United States senator from Minnesota
- Amy Knight (born 1946), American historian
- Amy Kremenek, American academic administrator
- Amy Kuhn, American politician
- Amy Kwok (born 1967), former Miss Hong Kong winner and actress based in Hong Kong
- Amy Landecker (born 1969), American actress
- Amy Lee (born 1981), American singer-songwriter, pianist and lead singer of Evanescence
- Amy Lee, American musician
- Amy Lindsay, American actress
- Amy Locane (born 1971), American actress
- Amy Lowell (1874–1925), American poet
- Amy Malek (c. 1979/1980), American scholar, and sociocultural anthropologist
- Amy Macdonald (born 1987), British singer-songwriter
- Amy MacDonald, American author
- Amy Madigan (born 1950), American actress
- Amy Mainzer (born 1974), American astronomer
- Amy Malbeuf, Canadian-Métis visual artist, educator, and cultural tattoo practitioner
- Amy Manson (born 1985), Scottish actress
- Amy Matysio, Canadian actress
- Amy McDonald (born 1985), Scottish football player and coach
- Amy McIlroy (born 1991), New Zealand bowls player
- Amy Meisak (born 1993), Scottish model and beauty pageant titleholder
- Amy Renee Mihaljevic (1978–1989), American child murder victim
- Amy Millan (born 1973), Canadian singer-songwriter
- Amy Miller (born 1980), Canadian filmmaker
- Amy Morton (born 1958 or 1959), American actress
- Amy Muir (born 2000), Scottish footballer
- Amy Ndiaye, Senegalese politician
- Amy Neighbors (born 1975), American politician
- Amy Nicholson, American film critic
- Amy Nuttall (born 1982), British actress and singer
- Amy O'Connor (born 1996 or 1997), Irish camogie player
- Amy Odell, American writer and author
- Amy Okonkwo (born 1996), Nigerian basketball player
- Amy Okuda (born 1989), Japanese-American actress
- Amy Oliver (born 1987), British archer
- Amy Olson (born 1992), American professional golfer
- Amy O'Neill (born 1971), American actress/performer
- Amy Oppenheimer (born 1952), American lawyer
- Amy Orben, British experimental psychologist
- Amy Paffrath, American television presenter and actress
- Amy Page, Australian clinical pharmacist
- Amy Palant, American voice actress and singer
- Amy Palmer (born 1975), American hammer thrower
- Amy Parkinson (1855–1938), Canadian poet
- Amy Parmenter (born 1997), Australian netball player
- Amy Pascal (born 1958), American film producer and business executive
- Amy Pearson (born 1985), English singer-songwriter
- Amy Peikoff (born 1968), American journalist
- Amy Pemberton (born 1988), British actress
- Amy Perez (born 1969), Filipina television presenter
- Amy Perruso (born 1968), Hawaiian politician
- Amy Phillips (born 1978), British Comedian and impressionist
- Amy Phillips (born 1973), American racing cyclist
- Amy Pharaoh (born 1979), British lawn bowler
- Amy Pieters (born 1991), Dutch racing cyclist
- Amy Pietz (born 1969), American actress
- Amy Pirnie (born 1993), Scottish kickboxer
- Amy Poehler (born 1971), American comedian and actress
- Amy Polumbo (born 1984), American musician and pageant winner
- Amy Porter, American flutist and pedagogue
- Amy Pope (born 1974), American attorney
- Amy Post (1802–1889), American activist
- Amy Potomak (born 1999), Canadian ice hockey player
- Amy Price-Francis (born 1975), British-Canadian actress
- Amy Prieto, American chemist
- Amy Pritchett, American aerospace engineer
- Amy Proal, American chemist
- Amy Purdy (born 1979), American actress and athlete
- Amy Pyle, American journalist and media executive
- Amy Ray (born 1964), American singer-songwriter, half of the Indigo Girls duo
- Amy Porter Rapp (1908–2002), American architect
- Amy Recha (born 1992), Singaporean footballer
- Amy Redford (born 1970), American actress, daughter of Robert Redford
- Amy Reed, American author
- Amy Reeder (born 1980), American comic artist
- Amy Reibman, American electrical engineer
- Amy Reiger, American politician
- Amy Reiley, American aphrodisiac foods authority and author
- Amy Ricard (1882–1937), American actress
- Amy Richards (born 1970), American activist
- Amy Richau, American writer
- Amy Richlin (born 1951), American academic
- Amy Ridenour (1959–2017), American conservative think tank founder
- Amy Rider (born 1985), Japanese-American actress and film director
- Amy Ridge (born 1996), Australian water polo player
- Amy Ridley (born 2002), Australian paralympic athlete
- Amy Robach (born 1973), American television journalist
- Amy Robbins (born 1971), English actress
- Amy Robinson (born 1948), American actress and film producer
- Amy Robstart (1532–1560), first wife of Robert Dudley, Earl of Leicester, favourite of Elizabeth
- Amy Rodgers (born 2000), British association football player
- Amy Rodriguez (born 1987), American soccer player
- Amy Roloff (born 1962), American television personality
- Amy Rosenthal (born 1974), British playwright
- Amy Rosenzweig (born 1967), American biochemist
- Amy Rudolph (born 1973), American runner
- Amy Rule (born 2000), New Zealand rugby player
- Amy Ruley (born 1955), American basketball player and coach
- Amy Ruman (born 1974), American racing driver
- Amy Rustomjee (1896–1976), Indian educator
- Amy Rutberg (born 1981), American actress
- Amy Ryan (born 1968), American actress
- Amy Ryan, English jockey
- Amy Sackville (born 1981), British writer
- Amy Sadao (born 1971), American art institution director, writer, juror, and lecturer
- Amy Salerno (born 1956), American politician
- Amy Sanders (born 1983), American basketball player
- Amy Sanderson (1876–1931), Scottish suffragette
- Amy Satterthwaite (born 1986), New Zealand cricketer
- Amy Saunders, British producer, performer, comedian, and curator
- Amy Sawyer (1863–1945), British painter
- Amy Sayer (born 2001), Australian footballer
- Amy Schatz, American director and producer
- Amy Schneider (born 1979), American writer and game show contestant
- Amy Scholder (born 1963), American editor and filmmaker
- Amy Schulman, American businessperson
- Amy Schumer (born 1981), American comedian and actress
- Amy Schwartz (born 1969), American professional tennis player and amateur golfer
- Amy Schwartz (1954–2023), American author and illustrator of children's books
- Amy Schwartz Moretti (born 1975), American violinist
- Amy Scurria (born 1973), American composer
- Amy Sedaris (born 1961), American actress, author, and comedian
- Amy Sedgwick (1835–1897), British actress
- Amy Seimetz (born 1981), American actress, writer, producer, director, and editor
- Amy Segerstedt (1835–1928), Swedish teacher, folk teacher, philanthropist
- Amy Seiwert, American ballet choreographer
- Amy Sène (born 1986), French-Senegalese hammer thrower
- Amy Serrano (born 1966), American author and film director
- Amy Sewell (born 1963), American author and filmmaker
- Amy Shark (born 1986), Australian musician
- Amy Sharrocks, British artist
- Amy Shearn (born 1979), American novelist
- Amy Sheehan (born 1986), Australian freestyle skier
- Amy Sheldon (born 1966), American politician
- Amy Shelyon, American cognitive psychology researcher and academic administrator
- Amy Sheppard (born 1990), Australian singer-songwriter
- Amy Sherald (born 1973), American portrait painter
- Amy Sherman-Palladino (born 1966), American television writer, director, and producer
- Amy Sherwin (1855–1935), Australian soprano singer
- Amy Shields (born 1990), American unicyclist
- Amy Shiels (born 1991), Irish actress
- Amy Shindler, British actress and television writer
- Amy Shuard (1924–1975), English opera singer
- Amy Shuler Goodwin (born 1971), American politician
- Amy Shuman (1925–2014), American baseball player
- Amy Siemons (born 1985), Dutch Paralympic athlete
- Amy Sillman (born 1955), American painter
- Amy Silverman (born 1967), American author, journalist, and blogger
- Amy Rose Silverman (born 1966), American real estate developer and philanthropist
- Amy Silverstein (1963–2023), American medical memoirist
- Amy Simon, American planetary scientist
- Amy Sinclair (born 1975), American politician
- Amy Singer, American historian
- Amy Singer (born 1953), American psychologist
- Amy Siskind (born 1965), American activist and writer
- Amy Skieresz (born 1976), American middle-distance runner
- Amy Skillman, American folklorist
- Amy Skubitz, American immunologist
- Amy Sky (born 1960), Canadian singer-songwriter, producer, actress, and television host
- Amy Sloan, Canadian actress
- Amy Smith (born 2004), Australian cricketer
- Amy Smith (born 1987), British swimmer
- Amy Smith (born 1998), Australian rules footballer
- Amy Smart (born 1976), American actress and fashion model
- Amy Snider (born 1942), Canadian hurdler
- Amy Sloan (born 1978), Canadian actress
- Amy Soranno (born 1993/1994), Canadian animal rights activist
- Amy Sohn, American author
- Amy Soranno (born 1993 or 1994), Canadian animal rights activist
- Amy Sol (born 1981), American painter
- Amy Spain (1848–1865), American slave
- Amy Spanger (born 1971), American actress
- Amy Spangler (born 1949), American activist
- Amy Speace, American singer-songwriter
- Amy Spencer (born 1985), English sprinter
- Amy Spurway (born 1976), Canadian author
- Amy St. Eve (born 1965), American federal judge
- Amy Stanley, American author and historian
- Amy Dru Stanley, American historian
- Amy Steadman (born 1984), American soccer player
- Amy Stewart, American author
- Amy Steel (born 1960), American actress
- Amy Stein (born 1970), American photographer
- Amy Stephens, American politician and lawyer
- Amy Stoch, American actress
- Amy Studt (born 1986), British singer-songwriter
- Amy Suehiro (1906–1968), Japanese entomologist
- Amy Sueyoshi, American historian
- Amy Summers (born 1963), American politician
- Amy Swensen (born 1980), American field hockey player
- Amy Swonger (born 1974), American political advisor
- Amy Tagliareni, American politician
- Amy Talkington, American filmmaker, screenwriter, and author
- Amy Tan (born 1952), American writer
- Amy Tanner (1870–1956), American psychologist
- Amy Taubin (born 1938), American author and film critic
- Amy Taylor (born 1996), Australian musician and activist
- Amy Taylor (born 2000), English professional golfer
- Amy Shira Teitel, Canadian author, popular science writer, historian, and YouTuber
- Amy Tennant (born 1994), English field hockey player
- Amy Mbacke Thiam (born 1976), Senegalese sprinter
- Amy Thielen, American chef, food writer, and television personality
- Amy Thiessen, Canadian singer-songwriter
- Amy Thompson (born 1994), Luxembourgish footballer
- Amy S. Thompson (born 1979), American linguist
- Amy Thomson (born 1987), British entrepreneur
- Amy Thomson (born 1958), American writer
- Amy Timberlake, American author
- Amy Timlin (born 1999), English boxer
- Amy Tinkler (born 1999), British gymnast
- Amy Tipton (born 1980), American actress
- Amy Toensing, American photojournalist
- Amy Tolsky (born 1961), American actress
- Amy Tong (born 1977), American judoka
- Amy Toscani (born 1963), American sculptor
- Amy Totenberg (born 1950), American judge
- Amy Toungara (born 1944), Ivorian politician
- Amy Towers (born 1970), American philanthropist and businesswoman
- Amy Townsend-Small (born 1976), American university teacher
- Amy Trappey, Taiwanese industrial engineer
- Amy Trask, American lawyer
- Amy Trigg (born 1992), British actress and writer
- Amy Truesdale (born 1989), British para taekwondo practitioner
- Amy Tryon (1970–2012), American equestrian eventer
- Amy Tuck (born 1963), American attorney and politician
- Amy Tucker, American basketball player and coach
- Amy Turner, American rower
- Amy Turner (born 1984), New Zealand rugby league and union player
- Amy Turner (born 1984), England international rugby union player
- Amy Uyematsu (1947–2023), Japanese-American poet
- Amy Vachal (born 1988), American singer-songwriter
- Amy Vachon (born 1978), American basketball player and coach
- Amy Van Buuren (born 1969), Dutch tennis player
- Amy Van Dyken (born 1973), American Olympic champion swimmer
- Amy Van Keeken, Canadian musician
- Amy Van Nostrand (born 1953), American actress
- Amy Van Singel (1949–2016), American radio host and music journalist
- Amy Vanderbilt (1908–1974), American author and socialite
- Amy Vedder (born 1951), American ecologist, primatologist, and conservationist
- Amy Veness (1876–1960), British actress
- Amy Vermeulen (born 1983), Canadian football forward
- Amy Vilela (born 1974 or 1975), American politician
- Amy Villarejo, American academic and writer
- Amy Vincent, American cinematographer
- Amy Vine (born 1991), Australian cricketer
- Amy Viranya Berry (born 1998), British-Thai beauty queen and model
- Amy Vitale (born 1977), American model, actress, and wrestling valet
- Amy Voce (born 1982), English radio broadcaster
- Amy Volk (born 1969), American politician
- Amy Sue Vruwink (born 1975), American politician
- Amy Walker (born 1982), American actress and singer
- Amy Wallace (1955–2013), American writer
- Amy Walter (born 1969), American political analyst
- Amy Wang (born 2002), American table tennis player
- Amy Robbins Ware (1877–1929), American author, world court worker, volunteer Red Cross nurse
- Amy Wax (born 1953), American law professor
- Amy Weber (born 1970), American model, singer, actress, and former WWE professional wrestler
- Amy Welborn (born 1960), an American author
- Amy Willerton (1992), English television presenter, model and beauty pageant titleholder
- Amy Williams (born 1982), British Olympic Skeleton champion
- Amy Winehouse (1983–2011), British singer-songwriter
- Amy Winfrey, American animator
- Amy Witting (born 1918–2001), Australian writer
- Amy D. Wohl, American information systems consultant
- Amy Wong (producer), Hong Kong television drama producer
- Amy Wing-Hann Wong, Canadian visual artist
- Amy Wright (born 1950), American actress
- Amy Wright (born 1980), American basketball coach
- Amy Wyss (born 1970/1971), Swiss-American billionaire businesswoman and philanthropist
- Amy Yamada (born 1959), Japanese writer
- Amy Yamazaki (born 1991), British actress
- Amy Yang (born 1989), South Korean golfer
- Amy Yao (born 1977), American visual artist
- Amy Yasbeck (born 1962), American actress
- Amy Yates (born 1998), Australian cricketer
- Amy Yip (born 1966), Hong Kong actress
- Amy Yuratovac (born 1982), American boxer
- Amy Zegart (born 1967), American writer and academic
- Amy Ziering (born 1962), American filmmaker
- Amy Zongo (born 1980), French athlete

== Fictional characters ==
- Sailor Mercury, a character in Sailor Moon, also known as Amy Anderson
- Amy Barlow, in the soap opera Coronation Street
- Amy Barnes, in the soap opera Hollyoaks
- Amy Farrah Fowler, a character in the American sitcom The Big Bang Theory
- Amy Gardner, lobbyist and the First Lady's Chief of Staff in The West Wing
- Amy Greene, in the TV series Friends
- Amy Greenwood, the TV soap opera Neighbours
- Amy Juergens, in the teen show The Secret Life of the American Teenager
- Amy Limietta, from the Magical Girl Lyrical Nanoha series
- Amy MacDougall, Robert Barone's girlfriend on the sitcom Everybody Loves Raymond
- Amy Madison, in the TV series Buffy the Vampire Slayer
- Amy March, from the novel Little Women by Louisa May Alcott
- Amy Matthews, in the TV series Boy Meets World
- Amy Pond, companion of the Doctor in the TV series Doctor Who
- Amy Pond, in the TV series Supernatural
- Amy Rose, from the video game franchise Sonic the Hedgehog
- Amy Santiago, in the TV series Brooklyn Nine-Nine
- Amy Sorel, in the Soul series of fighting games
- Amy Teo, from the BBC medical drama Holby City
- Amy Wong, a character in the animated TV series Futurama
- Amy Yeager, in the manga series Case Closed
- Amy Yuuzuki, in the TV series Zyuden Sentai Kyoryuger
- Fischl von Luftschloss Narfidort, real name Amy, in the video game Genshin Impact

== See also ==
- Aime
- Aimee
- Ami (given name)
