= Trappey =

Trappey is a surname. Notable people with the surname include:

- Amy Trappey (fl. late 20th–early 21st century), Taiwanese industrial engineer
- Bernard Trappey (1895–1994), American politician
- B.F. Trapé (fl. 1890s), or B.F. Trappey, American entrepreneur, 1898 founder of Trappey's Hot Sauce
