= Andreotti =

Andreotti (Italian: [andreˈɔtti]) is an Italian surname, derived from Andrea (Andrew). Notable people with the surname include:

- Aldo Andreotti (1924–1980), Italian mathematician
- Amy Andreotti, American biochemist
- Federico Andreotti (1837–1930), Italian painter
- Gérson Andreotti (b. 1953), Brazilian athlete
- Giulio Andreotti (1919–2013), Italian politician of the Christian Democracy party, former Prime Minister of Italy
- Jim Andreotti (1938–2022), Canadian professional athlete
- Lamberto Andreotti (born 1950), Italian executive
- Libero Andreotti (1875–1933), Italian sculptor
