= Sick Girl =

Sick Girl may refer to:

- Sick Girl (2008 film), a 2008 American film
- Sick Girl (2023 film), a 2023 American film
- "Sick Girl" (Masters of Horror), 10th episode of the first season of Masters of Horror
- The Sick Girl, or The Sick Child, painting by Gabriël Metsu
- Sick Girl, a memoir by Amy Silverstein that focuses on her heart failure and her first heart transplant.
