= Reibman =

Reibman is a surname. Notable people with this surname include:

- Amy Reibman, American electrical engineer
- Jeanette Reibman (1915–2006), American politician
- Larry Reibman, American television cinematographer on Hart of Dixie, A Million Little Things, and Pretty Little Liars
