= Amy Atkins =

American journalist and academic

Amy Atkins Sawyer is an American journalist. She was a long-time, on air correspondent for WNYW, Fox channel 5 in New York, Good Morning America, The Daily Show, Miami's WAMI-TV, and Court TV. She has written for numerous outlets and worked as adjunct professor of journalism at New York University.

== Career ==
For five years, Atkins was a weekend anchor and reporter at WNYW, Fox channel 5 in New York, where she hosted “Fox Style News,” a syndicated feature that focused on fashion, trends and ideas. In 1991, she wrote the documentary Mall Life on the burgeoning shopping mall in American life. Atkins was also a producer at the station. Atkins received two New York Emmy awards while at Channel 5, for feature reporting and Outstanding On-camera Achievement.

Atkins was a correspondent on ABC's Good Morning America. From 1998 to 1999, she appeared on The Daily Show, before leaving to join Miami's WAMI-TV.

Atkins was also the host of Barry Diller’s USA Broadcasting's The Times, an experimental local news project on WAMI-TV. The Washington Post described the show as “an eclectic mix of serious and lighthearted content…a loose and breezy tone.”

Atkins has also appear on Court TV, MSNBC, CNBC, CNN, and the Oxygen Network. As a print journalist, she has contributed to Marie Claire, Paper Magazine, City magazine, and The Forward. Amy Atkins has appeared in several films, portraying reporters, including It Could Happen to You, The Opposite of Sex, and City Hall.

Atkins joined New York University as an adjunct professor of journalism in 1995.

== Critical reception ==
The Messenger noted that her documentary Mall Life 'revealed' "an amusing bit of Americana... about a day in the life of the mall in its role as the "town square" of an automobile society."

== Personal life ==
Atkins went to high school with good friend, Bridget Fonda.

== Work ==
- Mall Life documentary. Fox 5 News/WNYW

== Awards ==
- Western Heritage Awards 1996. Award for Best News Feature for "Montana Cowgirls." Good Morning America (ABC-TV). Jeff Jayson, producer, and Amy Atkins, reporter
- New York Emmy Award for On Camera Achievement. 1993.

=== Nominations ===
- New York Emmy Nomination for On Camera Achievement. 1996.
- New York Emmy Nomination for On Camera Achievement. Ten O'Clock News. 1992.
