= Amy Baxter =

American physician and inventor (born 1967)

Amy Baxter (born April 24, 1967) is an American physician, inventor, and pain researcher. Baxter also serves as a board member at HomeoLux and Director of Emergency Research at the Pediatric Emergency Medicine Associates (Children's Healthcare of Atlanta, Scottish Rite).

== Early life and education ==
Baxter was born and raised in Lexington, Kentucky and displayed an interest in medicine and science from an early age. At 21, Baxter transferred from Dartmouth University to Yale University where she graduated with a Bachelor of Science degree. She then attended Emory Medical School where she attained her medical degree. She completed a pediatrics residency and a child maltreatment fellowship at Cincinnati Children's Hospital Medical Center and a pediatric emergency medicine fellowship at Children's Healthcare of Atlanta. She also obtained a K30-NIH Clinical Research Certificate at UT Southwestern Medical Center.

== Career ==
Baxter began practicing emergency pediatric medicine and is affiliated with Children's Healthcare of Atlanta. Baxter was Director of Emergency Research for Pediatric Emergency Medicine Associates and served as Clinical Associate Professor at the Medical College of Georgia.

Baxter acquired a research grant from the NIH to properly test her device and document the results.

Baxter also invented VibraCool, which is intended for musculoskeletal and arthritis pain relief. VibraCool uses the same concepts as Buzzy, but comes in a different shape and size.

=== Selected publications ===
- Baxter, Amy L.; Watcha, Mehernoor F.; Baxter, William Valentine; Leong, Traci; Wyatt, Matthew M. (June 1, 2011). "Development and Validation of a Pictorial Nausea Rating Scale for Children". Pediatrics. 127 (6): e1542-9. doi:10.1542/peds.2010-1410. PMID 21624874.
- Selent, Monica U.; Molinari, NoelleAngelique M.; Baxter, Amy; Nguyen, An V.; Siegelson, Henry; Brown, Clive M.; Plummer, Andrew; Higgins, Andrew; Podolsky, Susan; Spandorfer, Philip; Cohen, Nicole J.; Fishbein, Daniel B. (March 2013). "Mass Screening for Fever in Children: A Comparison of 3 Infrared Thermal Detection Systems". Pediatric Emergency Care. 29 (3): 305–313. doi:10.1097/PEC.0b013e3182854465. ISSN 0749-5161. PMID 23426254.
- "Local Anesthetic and Stylet Styles: Factors Associated With Resident Lumbar Puncture Success". publications.aap.org.
- Baxter, Amy L.; Cohen, Lindsey L.; McElvery, Heather L.; Lawson, Mona Louise; von Baeyer, Carl L. (December 2011). "An Integration of Vibration and Cold Relieves Venipuncture Pain in a Pediatric Emergency Department". Pediatric Emergency Care. 27 (12): 1151–1156. doi:10.1097/PEC.0b013e318237ace4. ISSN 0749-5161. PMID 22134226.
- "Twice-daily nasal irrigation reduces COVID-related illness, death, study finds". ScienceDaily.
