= Amy Braverman =

American statistician

Amy J. Braverman is an American statistician who analyzes remote sensing data and climate models as a senior research scientist at the Jet Propulsion Laboratory. She has also served as co-chair of the Climate Change Policy Advisory Committee of the American Statistical Association.

== Education ==
Braverman graduated from Swarthmore College in 1982, with a bachelor's degree in economics. From 1983 to 1991 she worked in litigation support consulting in Los Angeles before studying statistics. She went to the University of California, Los Angeles for graduate study, earning a master's degree in mathematics and a Ph.D. in statistics in 1999. Her dissertation, A Rate-distortion Approach to Massive Data Set Analysis, was advised by Don Ylvisaker.

== Recognition ==
In 2012, the American Statistical Association named Braverman as a fellow "for contributions to environmental statistics, particularly in the interface between massive-data reduction and remote sensing; and for service to the statistics community in climate research and policy".

In 2022, she was awarded the senior research scientist designation at JPL for her work in statistical methods and uncertainty quantification for remote sensing data. In January 2023, Braverman became the Chair for the SIAM Activity Group on Uncertainty Quantification.
