= Amy Toscani =

American sculptor

Amy Toscani (born 1963) is a Minnesota-based sculptor whose large scale works are informed by an arts and crafts aesthetic evocative of childhood. Amy Toscani was born in 1963 in Dayton, Ohio. She received both her Bachelor of Fine Arts and her Master of Fine Arts from Ohio University.

== Work ==
Amy Toscani's whimsical sculptures have been exhibited across the Twin Cities including the University of Minnesota, in Saint Paul's Western Sculpture Park, The Minneapolis Institute of Arts, Rosalux Gallery in Minneapolis, and Franconia Sculpture Park.

Chad Rutter characterizes Toscani's work as uniquely Midwestern in its aesthetic, due in part to her choice of source materials often being found in local thrift shops and merged with reconstituted plastic and steel. Toscani received Jerome Foundation grants in 1999, 2005 and 2006, a Bush Foundation grant in 2004 and a McKnight Artist Fellowship in 2013/14.
