= Amy Braunschweiger =

American journalist

Amy Braunschweiger is an American freelance writer and the author of Taxi Confidential: Life, Death and 3 A.M. Revelations in New York City, published by 671 Press. Her articles have appeared in publications including The New York Times, Tango, The Wall Street Journal, Worth, The Village Voice and The New York Sun, and New York magazine. Her work has also appeared in Germany's Welt am Sonntag and Leipziger Volkszeitung.

Braunschweiger was born and raised in Toledo, Ohio. She lives in the Brooklyn borough of New York City.

She also serves on the five-member board that oversees the Vietnam Relief Effort, a charity that has been involved in humanitarian public works projects in Vietnam since 1999.
