= Amy Ai =

American psychologist

Amy L. Ai is a professor of social work at College of Social Work and Pepper Institute on Aging and Public Policy of Florida State University.

== Education and career ==
Ai obtained her B.A. degree in medical and developmental psychology from the Institute of Psychology, Chinese Academy of Sciences in 1987. Following graduation, she came to the United States, where she attended University of Michigan, graduating with an M.A. degree in child development and educational psychology in 1990. Three years later she got her M.S.W. from the same institution and then got her M.S. and Ph.D. in psychology and social work in 1994 and 1996 respectively.

Ai works at both College of Social Work and Pepper Institute on Aging and Public Policy of Florida State University.

Ai is a fellow of the American Psychological Association and of the Gerontological Society of America. She was elected a fellow of the Society of Behavioral Medicine in 2023.
