= Amy Basken =

American campaigner

Amy Basken is an American campaigner for children born with congenital heart disease. She was a founding member of the Pediatric Congenital Heart Association and is currently its Director of Programs.

== Background ==
Basken has a son with congenital heart disease and a background in policy and advocacy. Realising there was no national advocacy organisation for families living with congenital heart disease, she founded the Pediatric Congenital Heart Association in 2013 along with her friend David Kasnic. She has a masters of science degree from the University of Wisconsin - Madison.

== Advocacy ==
In an article in U.S. News & World Report, Basken explained that part of the mission of Pediatric Congenital Heart Association is to empower families because "Families deserve to be empowered with essential information to support shared decision-making with their providers." The association developed the guided question tool with families to help them navigate the health care system when their child is diagnosed with congenital heart disease. Several children's hospitals in the USA, including Lurie Children's Hospital and Children's Hospital Colorado, now produce information for families that is based on the guided question tool and designed to address the Pediatric Congenital Heart Association's call for transparency. She is also leading Pediatric Congenital Heart Association's efforts to build better web resources for families to interpret published surgery outcomes.

Basken was instrumental in advocating for, and helping to pass, the Congenital Heart Futures Reauthorization Act that was passed by US Congress and became US law in 2018. The law authorizes $10 million in research, data collection, and awareness activities, at the Centers for Disease Control over the next five years, more than double previous funding.
