= Edward Amy =

Canadian soldier

- Born: March 28, 1918; Newcastle, New Brunswick
- Died: February 2, 2011 (aged 92); Camp Hill hospital, Halifax
- Military career
- Allegiance: Canada
- Branch: Canadian Army
- Rank: Brigadier-General
- Commands: 22nd Armoured Regiment (The Canadian Grenadier Guards)
- Conflicts: Battle of Falaise, Battle of Normandy,
- Awards: DSO, OBE, Military Cross, the CD and the American Bronze Star.

Brigadier-General Edward Alfred Charles Amy, DSO, OBE, MC, CD (March 28, 1918 – February 2, 2011) was a Canadian soldier who fought in World War II. He is one of Canada's most decorated soldiers.

He died on February 2, 2011, in the Camp Hill hospital, Halifax, aged 92.

== Education ==
Edward Amy graduated from the Royal Military College of Canada in Kingston, Ontario in 1939, student # 2510.

== Military service ==
Amy served as a tank commander. He commanded A Squadron, 14th Armoured Regiment (Calgary Regiment), in Italy, where he won the Military Cross for his "determined and gallant leadership in taking and holding a vital bridgehead over the Moro River" with his Sherman tanks in December 1943. He was also recipient of the Distinguished Service Order, an Officer of the Order of the British Empire, and recipient of the Canadian Forces' Decoration and the American Bronze Star.

Amy arrived in Normandy, France on July 26, 1944, seven weeks after D-Day as a major. He commanded a troop of the 22nd Armoured Regiment (The Canadian Grenadier Guards) in the fight for Grentheville three days later. During the next five weeks, he participated in all the battles that led to the liberation of Normandy. His regiment was awarded four distinctions for its action in the Battle of Falaise. He led an attack against Kurt Meyer's 12th SS Panzer Division that resulted in the liberation of Cintheaux and Bretteville. From August 14 to 17, 1944, his unit was committed to the Battle of Rouves, where his tank was destroyed. He took part in the fights of Falaise against elements of the 3rd SS Panzer Division and the 2nd SS Panzer Grenadier Regiment. After the Battle of Normandy, his unit went into action on the Seine and Somme Rivers, liberating many towns and villages and taking many German prisoners. In the closing months of the war, he fought in Belgium and Germany, where he was wounded. After the war, he remained in the Canadian Forces and retired as a brigadier-general in 1972.

== Recognition ==
On July 18, 2007, he was awarded the Légion d'honneur, France's highest distinction. The citation, stated that he "demonstrated outstanding bravery in France during the fiercest battles of World War II." He lived at Indian Point, Lunenburg County then in Halifax, Nova Scotia. He was an advocate for the reactivation of the Halifax Rifles (RCAC) as a reconnaissance unit, a project which was successfully completed in 2009.

On November 14, 2007, Wilfred Moore, a Canadian senator, congratulated him, thanked him and those who served under his command for their service to Canada.

The Lieutenant Governor of Nova Scotia, Mayann Francis, presented the Royal United Services Institute of Nova Scotia SAC Award to BGen Ned Amy on 7 November 2007.

On February 10, 2011, Wilfred P. Moore, a Canadian senator gave a tribute in the Senate to the late Brigadier-General Edward "Ned" Amy, DSO, CD.
