= Amy Thomson (entrepreneur) =

British entrepreneur (born 1987)

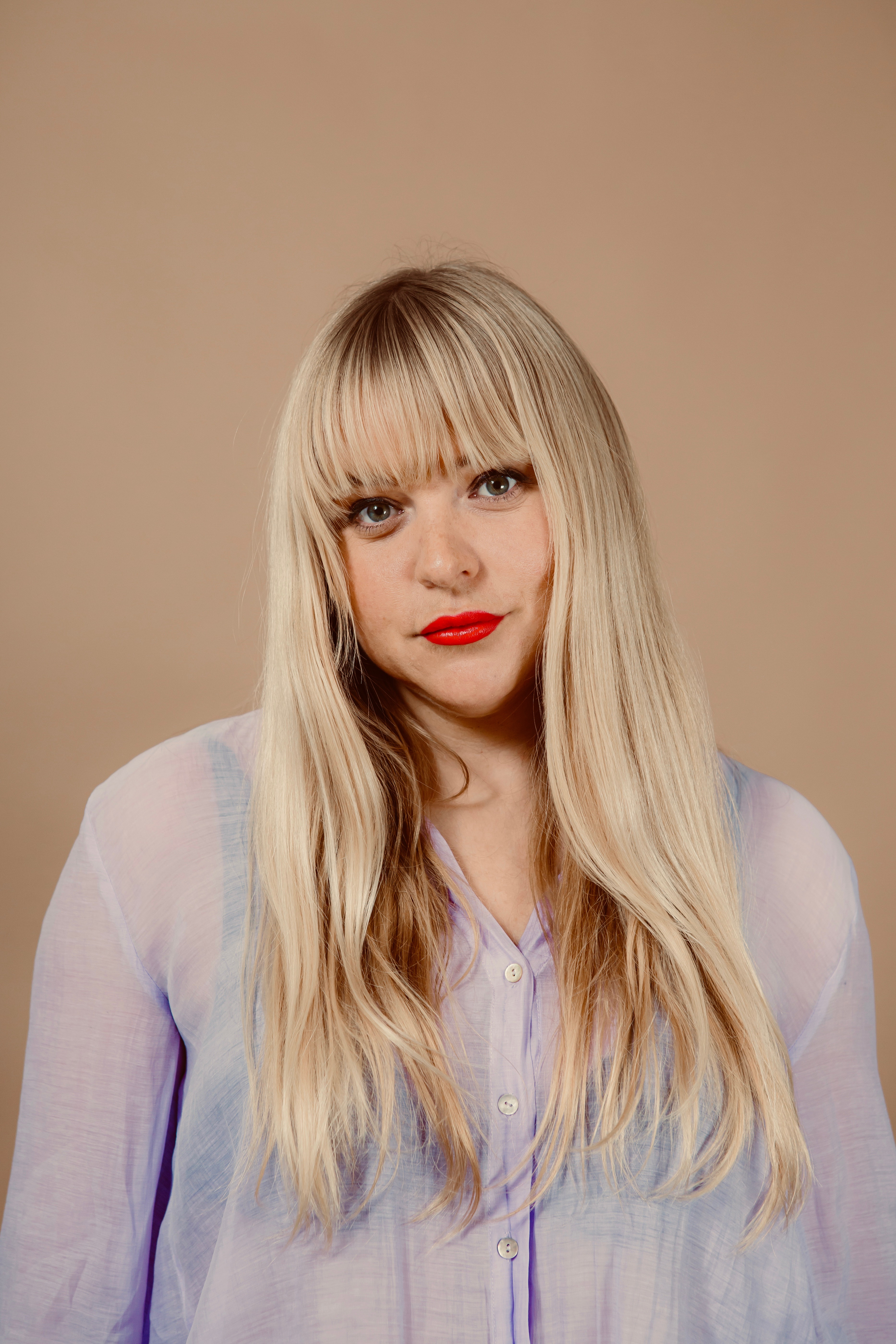

Amy Thomson (born 15 March 1987) is a British entrepreneur and author. She is the founder of the female health app and tech service Moody and author of Moody - A 21st Century Hormone Guide. She specialises in the future of data, business with emotional intelligence.

== Early life and education ==
Thomson was born in Norwich, Norfolk in the United Kingdom. She studied Sociology at Goldsmiths University (2005–2008).

== Career ==
=== SEEN ===
Shortly after leaving university Thomson founded her own communications agency SEEN in 2011. She became known for delivering live events and digital media for brands including Nike, RBS and Instagram with a focus on creating a content-led approach that drove quantifiable social engagement and sales. Thomson quickly scaled her company with UK and USA clients. Throughout her time at SEEN she consulted on technology and lifestyle brands including Apple and Facebook. She has delivered keynote talks with clients and media including Apple HQ and Vogue.

=== Moody ===
In 2017 Thomson identified an opportunity for personalised solutions for women's hormone cycles with a focus on EQ and tech built by women, for women. She sold Seen to Captivate Group and founded Moody, a Femtech app service for women's health and wellness. Thomson purpose-built an all female technology team with its first app technology live in the UK and USA. In March 2019 Forbes tipped Thomson's mission as the future of women's hormonal and mental health. Apple awarded her team Moody ‘Top Female Health App’ and they have been featured in The App Store’s Today Tab.

Thomson has raised £4.5m seed funding in the UK and US between 2018 and 2019.

== Education and advocacy ==
Thomson co-founded Future Girl Corp with Sharmadean Reid in 2016, which was launched with a bootcamp and workshops offering free education tools and insights for future female CEOs and business founders. In 2016 Thomson and Reid partnered with Google and Diageo on a series of events and workshops.
