= Amy Sarr Fall =

Senegalese magazine publisher

- Born: Dakar, Senegal
- Education: American University of Paris

Amy Sarr Fall is a Senegalese magazine founder. She is the publishing director of Intelligences, a magazine she founded in 2010. She is active in social work for women and youth. She is the initiator of "La Grande Rentrée Citoyenne".

== Biography ==
=== Studies and career ===
Amy Sarr Fall completed her primary and secondary education in Dakar, Senegal, where she was born. After obtaining her baccalaureate in Dakar, she enrolled at the American University of Paris. At the time of her enrollment, she was the only Senegalese student at the university. She earned a double bachelor's degree in International Communication and International Business Administration before obtaining a master's degree in Global Communication. The UAP administration decided to organize a communication campaign around her in order to rally young people in her country to the cause.

In her work she met Abdou Diouf, the Secretary General of the International Organisation of the Francophonie, and Boutros Boutros-Ghali, former Secretary-General of the United Nations.

=== Blog "World for Obama" ===
Through her blog "World for Obama, Citizens of the World", she mobilized some 3,000 people on the social network Facebook. Through this blog, she expressed her opinions on the 2008 United States presidential election, and was reported on by the The New York Times.

=== Return to Senegal and creation of Intelligences magazine ===
She returned to Senegal in 2009, where she founded a communications company that would help schools and hospitals prepare campaigns. She collaborated with the main hospital in Dakar. With Boubacar Wade, then Director General, she launched the HPD-PNLP coalition, which aimed to optimize efforts to combat malaria. In 2010, her magazine, Intelligences, was launched. The magazine focuses on key figures in the country's development.
