= Amy Spangler =

Breastfeeding expert (born 1949)

- Born: July 19, 1949; Cincinnati, Ohio, United States
- Occupation(s): Lactation Consultant, Registered Nurse and Teacher

Amy Spangler is a breastfeeding expert and president of baby gooroo who has lectured extensively and published several books on breastfeeding. In addition to earning a bachelor's and master's degree in nursing, Spangler is a registered nurse and an internationally board certified lactation consultant, and she has held leadership positions with national and international organizations including President of the International Lactation Consultant Association. She has also served as an expert contributor to Breastfeeding.com and as a member of their professional advisory board.

== Career ==
Spangler earned a bachelor's degree in nursing from Ohio State University and a master's degree in maternal and child health from the University of Florida. Spangler is an adjunct faculty member at Emory University's Nell Hodgson Woodruff School of Nursing.

Spangler published her first book, "Breastfeeding: A Parent’s Guide", in 1985. "Breastfeeding: A Parent’s Guide" is now in its 9th edition. Spangler has also published two subsequent books: "Breastfeeding: Keep It Simple" and "Breastfeeding: Your Guide To A Healthy, Happy Baby" in 2000 and 2004 respectively.

From 1996 to 1998, Spangler served as president of the International Lactation Consultant Association. Then from 2002 to 2004, she served as chair of the United States Breastfeeding Committee. She has also held positions with the International Board of Lactation Consultant Examiners, Association of Women’s Health Obstetric Neonatal Nursing, International Childbirth Education Association, La Leche League International, Georgia Breastfeeding Task Force, Georgia Chapter of the American Academy of Pediatrics, Southeastern Lactation Consultant Association, Breastfeeding.com and U.S. Food and Drug Administration Infant Formula Subcommittee.

Spangler has also worked as a consultant for an Ad Council campaign and as a commentator on various news programs, including 20/20 and Good Morning America.

== baby gooroo ==
Since 1987, with the founding of Amy's Babies, Spangler has focused on educating parents and health professionals about breastfeeding and infant/child nutrition through the development of books, brochures, posters, and videos. In 2000, the company launched its first e-commerce store to accommodate online purchases. The site was expanded in 2004 into a feature-driven news site and the company was renamed baby gooroo with the goal of becoming the definitive online resource for information related to breastfeeding, health, nutrition, and safety. Under Spangler’s leadership, baby gooroo has assembled a team of breastfeeding and parenting experts who provide readers with information that is accurate, balanced, and timely.

Since the 1985 release of Breastfeeding: A Parent's Guide, baby gooroo has sold over two million copies of its three books to parents, healthcare facilities, and government agencies nationwide.

== Life ==
Spangler lives in Atlanta, Georgia, with her husband Dennis. They have two sons, Matthew and Adam.

== Amy’s Babies/baby gooroo Bibliography ==
- Breastfeeding: A Parent’s Guide - 1985
- ”Through Their Eyes, Breastfeeding the Gift for Life Video” - 1996
- Breastfeeding: Keep It Simple - 2000
- Breastfeeding: Your Guide To A Healthy, Happy Baby - 2004
- ”Signs That Your Baby Is Well Fed” - 2007
- ”Signs That Your Baby Is Positioned Well” - 2007
- ”Keep your baby safe from SIDS, Do’s and Don’ts” - 2007
- ”The Scoop on Poop” - 2007
- ”Breastfeeding Positions” - 2009

== Academic Bibliography ==
- Hildebrandt, Evelyn; Spangler, Amy (September 30, 1993). "The Effect of Modified Lanolin on Nipple Pain/Damage During the First Ten Days of Breastfeeding". International Journal of Childbirth Education. 8 (3). Minneapolis: 15–19. ProQuest 212864505.
- Hancock, Kathleen F.; Spangler, Amy K. (September 1993). "There's a Fungus Among Us!". Journal of Human Lactation. 9 (3): 179–180. doi:10.1177/089033449300900320. PMID 8260036. S2CID 34447762.
- Gromada, Karen Kerkhoff; Spangler, Amy K. (1998). "Breastfeeding Twins and Higher-order Multiples". Journal of Obstetric, Gynecologic, & Neonatal Nursing. 27 (4): 441–449. doi:10.1111/j.1552-6909.1998.tb02668.x. PMID 9684207.
- Ellerbee S, Overfield M, Tully MR, and Spangler AK: Evidence-Based Guidelines for Breastfeeding Management during the First Fourteen Days. Maternal Child Health Bureau, Washington, DC, 1999.
- Ellerbee S, Overfield M, Tully MR, and Spangler AK: 'Development of Evidence-based Guidelines by a Professional Organization.' Seventh Biennial Research Conference Oklahoma Nursing Research Consortium: Poster Presentation, 1999.
- Ellerbee, SM; Spangler, AK (Winter 2000). "Childbirth Education Primer". Mother Baby Journal. 5 (1): 36–39.
- Spangler AK: Breastfeeding in a Bottle-feeding Culture. Breastfeeding.com Reading Room Online Articles, 2000.
- Spangler AK: Someone’s been sleeping in my bed! Breastfeeding.com Reading Room Online Articles, 2000.
- Spangler, Amy (May 2000). "Lactation Education in the 21st Century: A Retrospective". Journal of Human Lactation. 16 (2): 93–94. doi:10.1177/089033440001600201. PMID 11153348. S2CID 32051043.
- Spangler, Amy (March 2001). "Now I lay me down to sleep". International Journal of Childbirth Education. 16 (1). Minneapolis: 29–31. ProQuest 212797881.
- Spangler, A (July 2001). "Breastfeeding education. Keep it simple". Advance for Nurse Practitioners. 9 (7): 75–76. PMID 12420458.
- Spangler A (Contributor): Core Curriculum for Lactation Consultant Practice: 'Physiology of the Infant.' Jones and Bartlett Publishers, Boston, 2002.
- Overfield M, Tully MR, Ryan CR and Spangler AK: Clinical Guidelines for the Establishment of Exclusive Breastfeeding. Maternal Child Health Bureau, Washington, DC, 2005.
- Howett, Maeve; Spangler, Amy; Cannon, Rose B. (February 2006). "Designing a University-Based Lactation Course". Journal of Human Lactation. 22 (1): 104–107. doi:10.1177/0890334405283668. PMID 16467292. S2CID 20503389.
- Spangler, Amy K.; Randenberg, Andrea L.; Brenner, Michelle G.; Howett, Maeve (May 2008). "Belly Models as Teaching Tools: What Is Their Utility?". Journal of Human Lactation. 24 (2): 199–205. doi:10.1177/0890334408316079. PMID 18436972. S2CID 24970432.
