= Amy Thiessen =

Canadian singer-songwriter from Calgary

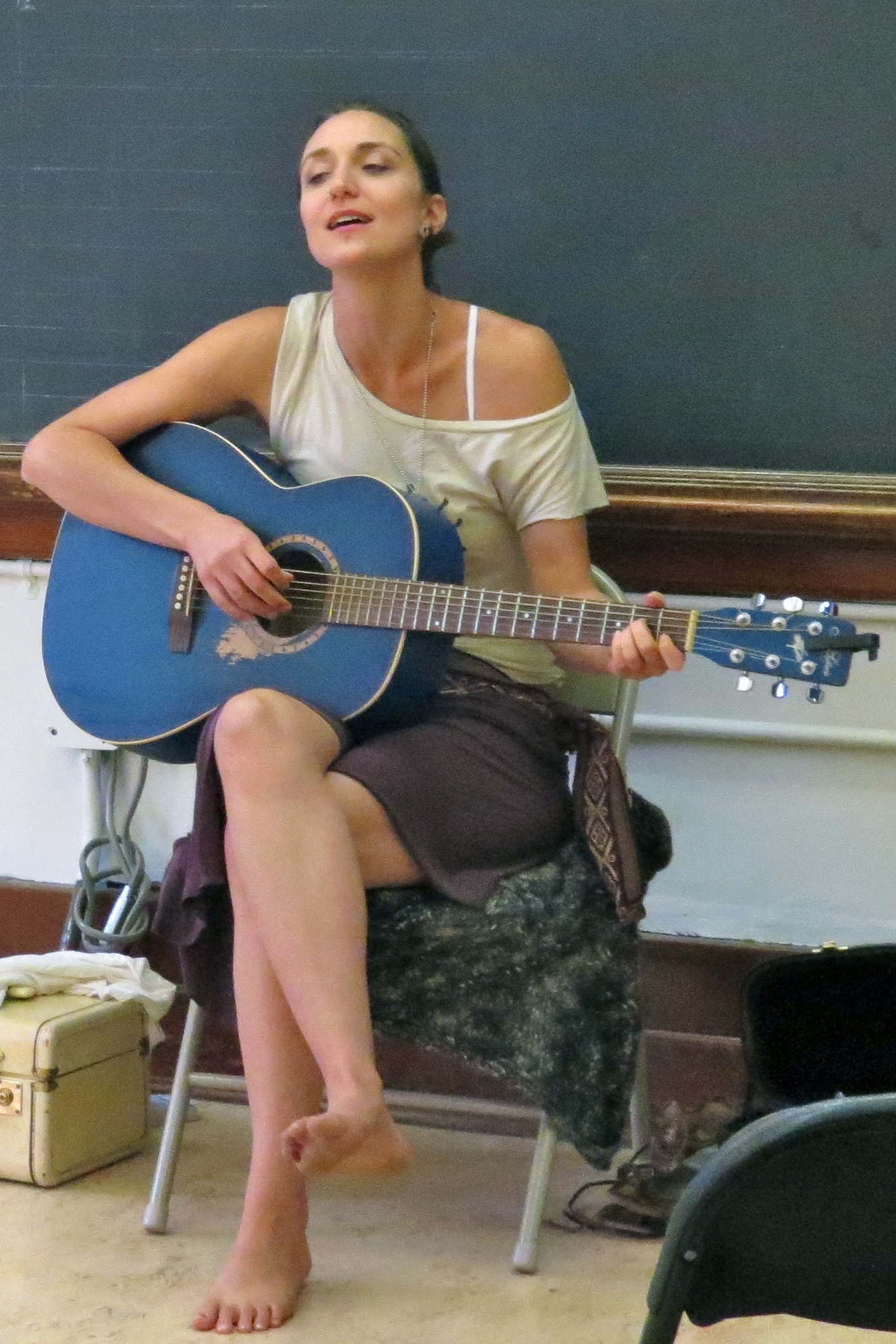
- Thiessen in 2012

Background information
- Origin: Calgary
- Occupation: Singer-songwriter
- Instrument: Guitar

Amy Thiessen is a Canadian singer-songwriter from Calgary.

Thiessen's debut full-length album was Give Up The Fight, released in 2011. Her second album, In Between Goodbyes (2014), was produced by Russell Broom. In a Fast Forward Weekly review of Give Up the Fight, James Wilt wrote "Thiessen's lyrical honesty and powerful voice deserves a listen."

Thiessen is a certified Yoga instructor, which she says has influenced her music, especially her first album.
