= Amy Porter Rapp =

American architect (1908–2002)

- Born: Amy Katherine Porter; December 15, 1908; Halsey, Oregon, United States
- Died: June 19, 2002 (aged 93)
- Other names: Amy Katherine Porter Rapp
- Education: University of Oregon, B.A.
- Occupation: architect
- Years active: 1941–1955
- Known for: residences and congregational churches
- Notable work: Single Family Homes; Oregon; First Congregational Church Remodel; Great Falls, Montana; First Congregational Church Basement Remodel; Portland, Oregon
- Spouse: Andrew Lee Rapp (m. 1931; died 1996)
- Parents: Frank Hailey Porter (father); Catherine Maude Hopkins (mother)

Amy Katherine Porter Rapp (December 15, 1908 – June 19, 2002) was an American architect from Oregon. She worked primarily in Portland on residences and congregational churches.

== Early life ==
Rapp was born in Halsey, OR. Her parents were Catherine Maude Hopkins and Frank Hailey Porter. Frank Hailey Porter represented Linn County in the Oregon House of Representatives from 1913 to 1917.

The Rapp family moved to Portland, Oregon in 1919. Rapp graduated from Grant High School in 1927. She attended the University of Oregon and graduated with a degree in architecture in 1931. A highlight of this period was Rapp's introduction to Frank Lloyd Wright. A friend of department head W.R.B. Willcox, Wright gave critiques of current student projects and participated in informal gatherings with students. At the University of Oregon, Rapp belonged to the Alpha Omicrom Pi sorority. Architect Chloethiel Woodard Smith was one of her sorority sisters.

Rapp married Andrew Lee Rapp (d. 1996) in 1931.

== Career ==
Rapp graduated with the onset of the Great Depression and had trouble finding work as an architect. According to her, "In 1931, with the Depression, no jobs were available for a geologist and certainly no job for a fledgling architect – in fact – no jobs at all. We were lucky - we managed my dad's apartment building."

In 1941 the Rapps bought a 50' x 150' lot and Amy designed the family's home herself.

It was not until 15 years after graduation that Rapp started designing homes in reaction to a lack of government funds for new veteran homes. She did this with no prior office experience, two children and a third on the way. Rapp comments on this with a memory of her youngest child who tip-toed through the house, she "heard, 'Shush, Mama is architecting.' I thought – that's it. I burned the midnight oil after that until he was in school."

As a volunteer, she chaired the Building Committee of the First Congregational Church in Portland, and represented the church on the jury for the Portland Center for the Performing Arts. She drew plans for church additions, and strove to keep the existing exposed stonework and brick. She further reviewed expansion plans and grew her professional skills of client relationships.

Rapp completed her last commissioned home in 1955 and turned to help her husband with the Green Furniture Hospital, which was a repairing and refinishing shop of furniture that later added antiquities.

== Education ==
B.A., University of Oregon, 1931.

== Notable Projects ==
- Single Family Homes; Oregon
- First Congregational Church Remodel; Great Falls, Montana
- First Congregational Church Basement Remodel; Portland, OR
