= William Lacey Amy =

Canadian writer

- Born: June 9, 1877; Sydenham, Ontario
- Died: November 26, 1962 (aged 85); St. Petersburg, Florida
- Occupation: Writer
- Spouse(s): Lillian Eva Payne (m. 1899; died 1938) Gladys Burston Miller (m. 1941)
- Writing career
- Pen name: Luke Allan
- Genres: Western, mystery

William Lacey Amy (June 9, 1877 – November 26, 1962) known by the penname Luke Allan was a Canadian (Note: Some sources refer to Amy as British which may come from the fact that he spent time in England as a journalist and travelled widely elsewhere in the world.) journalist and writer of western and mystery fiction.

== Biography ==
Amy was born in Sydenham, Ontario, to Rev. Thomas Amy and Mary Ann Balfour. Due to his father's itinerant profession, he was educated wherever his father worked in small towns across Ontario. In 1896, he attended the University of Toronto where he studied classics and athletics. He graduated in 1899 when he married Lillian Eva Payne. A journalist by training, he joined the Medicine Hat Times in 1905 where he worked at reporting, before becoming its editor and later its owner. During his time at the paper he learned the writing profession and he wrote his first short story which appeared in the Canadian Magazine in 1911. The story, "Blue Pete, the Sentimental Half Breed" formed the basis for the series of novels which he would contribute to over the next 45 years.

In 1916, he left Alberta and travelled to Nova Scotia and then to London, England where he worked as a war correspondent and a freelance writer. He published articles in Canadian Magazine detailing the experiences of Canadian soldiers fighting in France.

After the war he travelled the world in Europe, Africa and the Polynesian islands of the Pacific Ocean. He returned to Canada in 1940 due to wartime limitations on travel. His first wife having died in 1938, he married again in 1941 to Gladys Burston Miller.

In the 1930s, he began writing novels sometimes two per year. At this time he began publishing under the pseudonym Luke Allan. He published about 20 novels in the Blue Pete series which were set in western Canada. He portrayed the North West Mounted Police as a powerful force limiting crime. Thus his novels centred more on mystery themes rather than banditry. He also wrote seven novels with a detective protagonist, Gordon Mildrew. He wrote 15 other novels on various themes.

Amy died in St. Petersburg, Florida, on 26 November 1962.

== Works ==
=== Blue Pete ===
- Blue Pete: Half Breed (1921)
- The Return of Blue Pete (1922)
- Blue Pete: Detective (1928)
- Blue Pete (1938)
- The Vengeance of Blue Pete (1939)
- Blue Pete: Rebel (1940)
- Blue Pete Pays a Debt (1942)
- Blue Pete Breaks the Rules (1943)
- Blue Pete: Outlaw (1944)
- Blue Pete's Dilemma (1945)
- Blue Pete to the Rescue (1947)
- Blue Pete's Vendetta (1947)
- Blue Pete and the Pinto (1948)
- Blue Pete Works Alone (1948)
- Blue Pete, Unofficially (1949)
- Blue Pete: Indian Scout (1950)
- Blue Pete at Bay (1951)
- Blue Pete and the Kid (1953)
- Blue Pete Rides the Foothills (1953)
- Blue Pete in the Badlands (1954)

=== Gordon Muldrew ===
- The Mask Stranger (1930)
- Murder at Midnight (1930)
- The Jungle Crime (1931)
- The Fourth Dagger (1932)
- Murder at the Club (1933)
- Behind the Wire Fence (1935)
- Beyond the Looked Door (1938)

=== Other novels ===
- The Lone Trail (1922)
- The Beast (1924)
- The Westerner (1924)
- The Pace (1926)
- The White Camel (1926)
- The Sire (1927)
- The End of the Trail (1931)
- The Dark Spot (1932)
- The Many-Coloured Thread (1932)
- The Traitor (1933)
- Five for One (1934)
- Scotland Yard Takes a Holiday (1934)
- The Black Opal (1935)
- The Case of the Open Drawer (1936)
- The Ghost Murder (1937)
- The Man on the Twenty-Fourth Floor (1937)
- The Tenderfoot (1939)
