= Amy Betz =

American materials scientist

Amy Rachel Betz is an American materials scientist whose research investigates the effects of water-attracting and water-repelling surfaces on heat transfer and on icing of aircraft surfaces. She is an associate professor of mechanical and nuclear engineering at Kansas State University, where she also serves as assistant dean for retention, diversity and inclusion.

== Education and career ==
Betz has a 2006 bachelor's degree in mechanical engineering from George Washington University. She went to Columbia University for graduate study in mechanical engineering, earning a master's degree in 2008 and completing her Ph.D. in 2011. Her doctoral dissertation, Multiphase Microfluidics for Convective Heat Transfer and Manufacturing, was supervised by Daniel Attinger.

Before she completed her studies, Betz worked in hotel management. She joined the Kansas State University faculty in 2011, She became assistant dean for retention, diversity and inclusion in the Kansas State University College of Engineering in 2019.

== Recognition ==
Betz's efforts to encourage women in engineering were recognized by the K-State Office for the Advancement of Women in Science and Engineering, which gave her their KAWSE Award in 2016, and again in 2023.

In 2017, the American Society of Mechanical Engineers (ASME) International Conference on Nanochannel, Microchannels, and Minichannels gave her their Outstanding Leadership Award. She was elected as an ASME Fellow in 2022.
