= Amy D. Wohl =

American information systems consultant

Amy D. Wohl is an American information systems consultant. Her work focuses on software as a service (SaaS), IT strategy, and human-computer interaction (HCI).

== Education ==
Wohl holds a Bachelor of Arts in economics from LaSalle College, and a Masters of Arts received from Temple University, also in Economics.

== Career ==
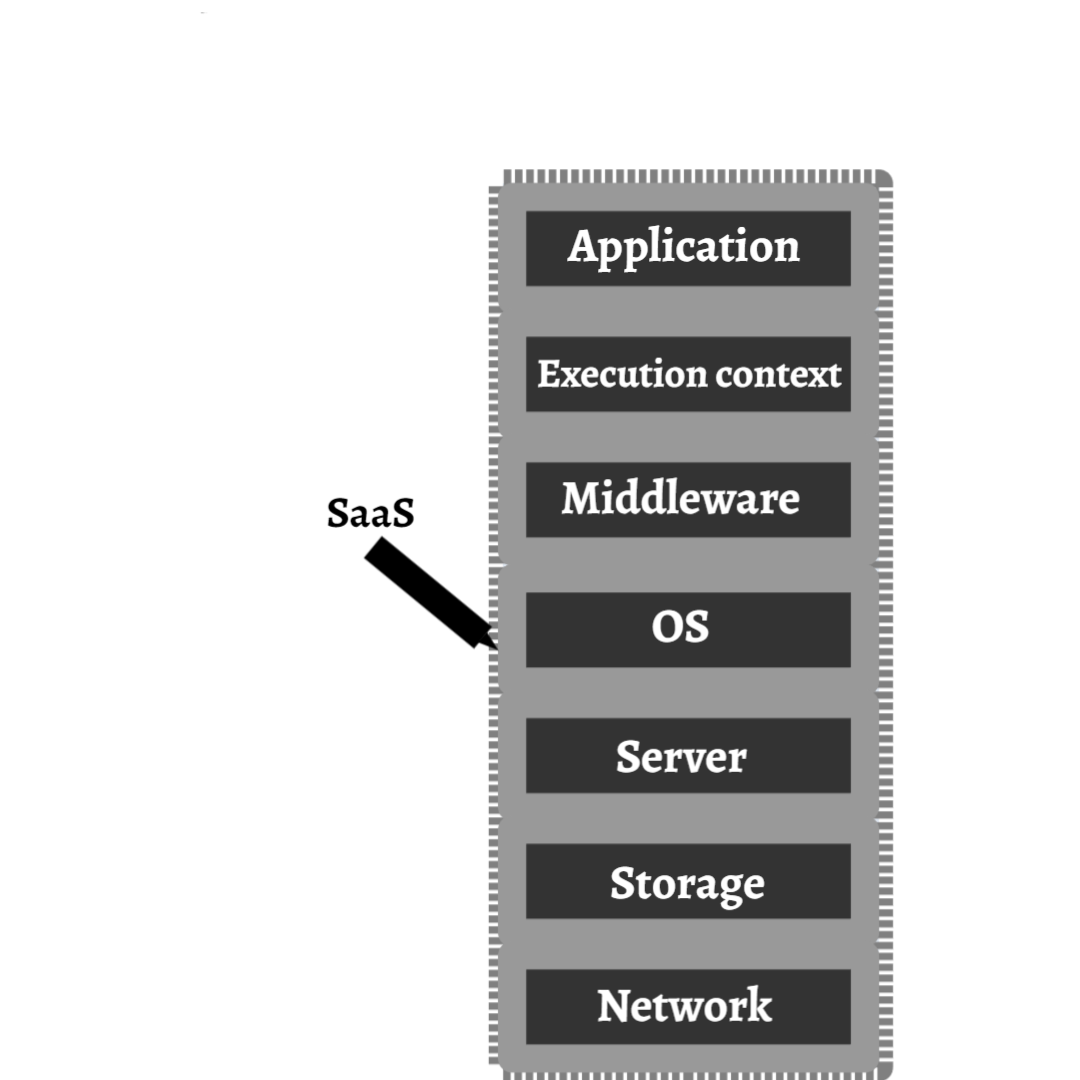
Software as a Service

Wohl works as a consultant and advisor to the internet design company Interactive Intelligence.

Wohl is a regular editor for Spectrum Middleware, and to the trade and general business press. She teaches technology courses at the University of Pennsylvania.

She is the president of consulting firm Wohl Associates.
