= Amy Ashworth =

Dutch-American activist

- Born: Amélie Wilhelmine Marie Everard; August 31, 1924; Haarlem, the Netherlands
- Died: April 6, 2017 (age 92); Ojai, California, U.S.
- Occupation(s): Activist, co-founder of P-FLAG

Amy Ashworth (August 31, 1924 – April 6, 2017), born Amélie Wilhelmine Marie Everard, was a Dutch-born American activist and nurse. In 1973, she was one of the co-founders of PFLAG.

== Early life and education ==
Everard was born in Haarlem, the daughter of Pieter Franciscus Joseph Everard. She attended the Lycee Pensionnat de Français in Nijmegen. She worked as a nurse in Amsterdam during World War II.

== Career ==
After World War II, Everard moved to New York City, where she worked at the Dutch consulate. She later worked as a physical therapist at a nursing home. Ashworth and her husband, along with Jeanne Manford and her husband Jules, and Elaine Benov and her husband Bob, founded Parents of Gays in 1973, now known as PFLAG, at a meeting held in a Greenwich Village church. They marched with their children in the earliest Pride parades, maintained a phone hotline, spoke to community groups, lobbied state and federal governments, and built an international rights organization. "There is so much prejudice against gays," she told a 1977 audience. "We have to back our children. It's easier not to, but somebody has to."

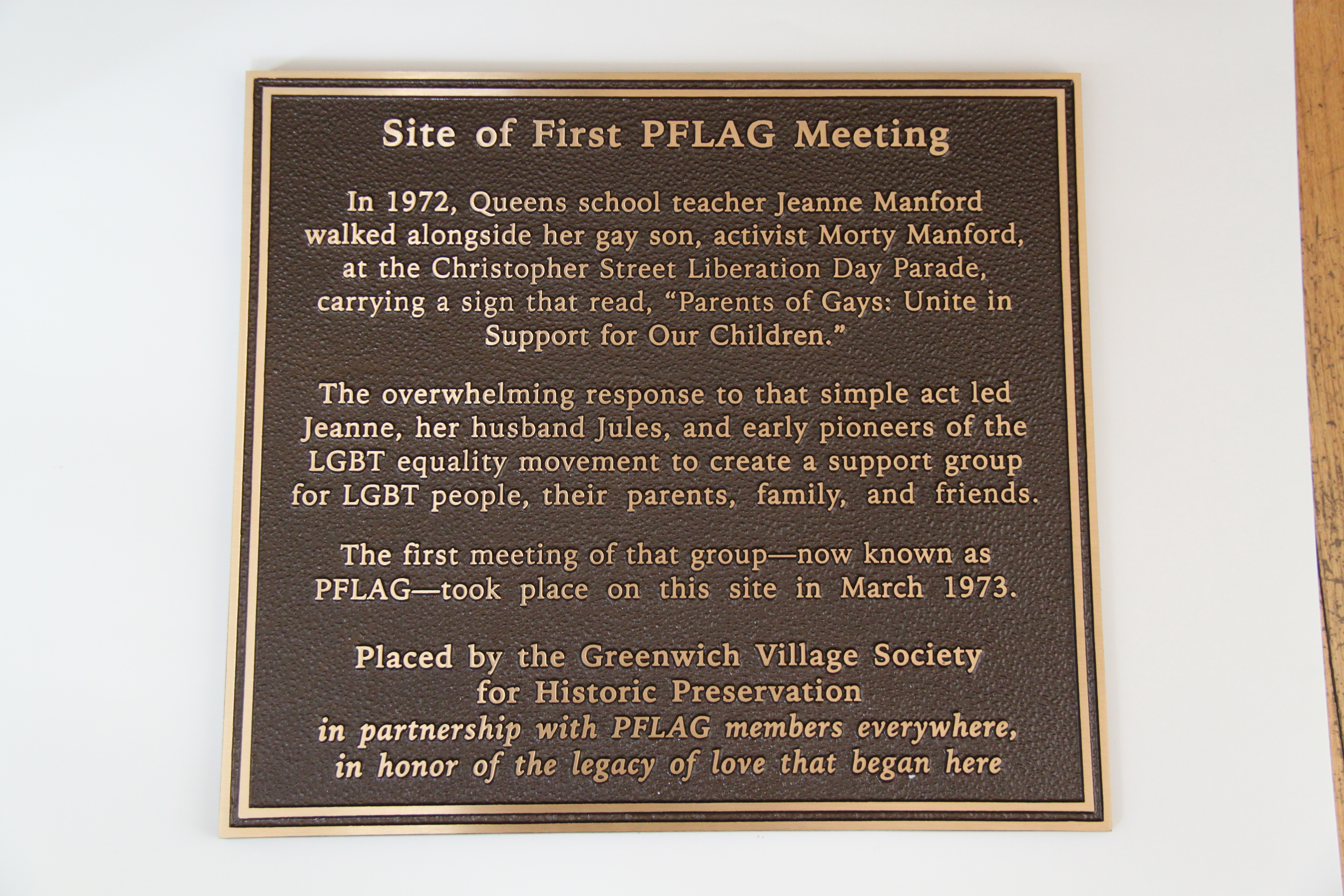
Parents, Families, and Friends of Lesbians and Gays (PFLAG), Plaque at site of first meeting in 1973

The Ashworths were also members of the board at the Institute for the Protection of Lesbian & Gay Youth (now the Hetrick-Martin Institute). They were guests on national television and radio programs, and Amy hosted a talk show on local television. She was director of the New York City chapter of PFLAG, and worked with hospice and other support programs serving people with HIV/AIDS. Raised in the Catholic church, she also spoke about the church's response to homosexuality. In 1992, Ashworth's work was recognized with a Stonewall Award from the Anderson Prize Foundation.

== Personal life ==
Amy Everard married lawyer Richard Goodspeed Ashworth in 1952. They lived in Bronxville and had three sons, Tucker, Eric, and Everard. She became a naturalized United States citizen in 1967. Tucker and Eric Ashworth both died from AIDS, in 1987 and 1997. Dick Ashworth died from cancer in 1998. She died in 2017, at the age of 92, in Ojai, California. The location of the first meeting of PFLAG is now marked with a historical plaque.
