= Amy Bernardy =

Italian journalist (1880–1959)

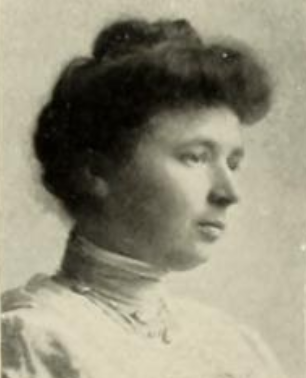
- Amy Bernardy, from the 1908 yearbook of Smith College
- Born: 16 January 1880; Florence
- Died: 25 October 1959 (aged 79); Rome
- Occupations: Journalist, ethnographer, folklorist, writer, lecturer

Amy Allemand Bernardy (16 January 1880 – 25 October 1959) was an Italian journalist, folklorist, ethnographer, and writer known for her studies of Italian emigration and expatriate communities in North America, the Ottoman Empire, and the Caribbean. She routinely reported on the social and cultural conditions of Italian migrants abroad, particularly women and children.

== Early life and education ==
Amy Bernardy was born in Florence, the daughter of an Irish-American diplomat and an Italian mother. She was educated at l'Istituto di Studi Superiore in Florence, graduating in 1901 with a thesis on the history of Turkish-Venetian relations. Her academic mentor was Pasquale Villari; he was president of the Dante Alighieri Society, and she was the society's vice president.

== Career ==
Bernardy was a lecturer on Italian subjects at Smith College in Massachusetts from 1903 to 1910. While in America, she wrote for American and Italian newspapers and magazines. She was commissioned by the Italian government to report on the effects of emigration on Italian-born women and their children in North America, including a visit to Ellis Island, and studies of regional differences and of "Little Italy" neighborhoods in American and Canadian cities. She presented her findings at a conference on Italian ethnography in 1910. She also studied Italian expatriate communities in Turkey and in the West Indies. She returned to the United States from 1917 to 1920, to work at the Italian embassy in Washington, D.C., during World War I.

Bernardy spoke against women's suffrage and for protections for workers' families, on a lecture tour of the United States in 1910. She taught at the University of Florence in the 1930s, and toured in Canada as a speaker on Italian social issues and expatriates, especially on education, in 1934. On that tour, she defended the policies of Italy's fascist government, and dismissed criticisms against it as being based on 'fables'.

== Publications ==
- L'ultima guerra turco-veneziana (1902)
- Venezia E Il Turco Nella Seconda Meta Del Secolo XVII (1902)
- Zampogne e cornamuse nel secolo d'Elisabetta (1902)
- America vissuta (1911)
- Italia randagia attraverso gli Stati Uniti (1913)
- L'Istria e la Dalmazia (1915)
- La Via dell' Oriente (1916)
- "The War Service of Italian Women" (1919)
- "The Adriatic 'Irredenta'" (1919)
- La questione adriatica vista d'oltre Atlantico (1917–1919) (1923)
- Paese che vai; il mondo come l'ho visto io (1923, an autobiography)
- Forme e colori di vita regionale italiana (1926)
- Santa Caterina da Siena (1926)
- Istria e Quarnaro (1927)
- La vita e l'opera di Vittoria Colonna (1927)
- Zara e i monumenti italiani della Dalmazia (1928)
- Rinascita regionale (1930)
- Passione italiana sotto cieli stranieri (1931)

== Personal life ==
Bernardy died in 1959, in Rome.
