= Amy Silverman =

American author and journalist

- Born: October 27, 1967 (age 58); Phoenix, AZ, U.S.
- Education: Scripps College, Columbia University
- Occupation: Journalist
- Writing career
- Language: English
- Notable works: My Heart Can't Even Believe It: A Story of Science, Love, and Down Syndrome
- Website: www.amy-silverman.com

Amy Silverman is an American author, journalist, blogger, and National Public Radio contributor. She is a former managing editor at Phoenix New Times and a commentator for KJZZ, the National Public Radio affiliate in Phoenix. Her work has appeared on the radio show This American Life and in The New York Times. She has a master's in journalism from Columbia University. Her memoir, My Heart Can't Even Believe It, was published by Woodbine Press in May 2016; it accounts for her experience raising a daughter with Down syndrome.
