= Amy Wing-Hann Wong =

Canadian visual artist

- Born: 1981 (age 44–45); Toronto, Canada
- Known for: visual artist
- Website: Official website

Amy Wing-Hann Wong, or Amy Wong, is a Canadian visual artist of Cantonese Chinese descent from Toronto specializing in oil painting exploring culture, identity politics, and feminism. She holds a Bachelor of Fine Arts from Concordia University, a Master of Fine Arts at York University, and has lived and work in Amsterdam, Xiamen, Brooklyn, Barcelona and Miami. She is an instructor at the Art Gallery of Ontario.

Wong is the founder of the Angry Asian Feminist Gang (AAFG) an artists' group focusing on Asian feminist concerns and proponents of artists who are mothers. She is also involved and teaches with the Girls’ Art League (GAL), an organization empowering women through visual arts.
