= Amy Compton-Phillips =

American healthcare administrator (born 1963)

- Born: December 3, 1963 (age 62); Webster Groves, Missouri, U.S.

Amy Compton-Phillips (born December 3, 1963) is an American healthcare administrator who was the President of Clinical Care for Providence St. Joseph Health in the US. She is known for leading PSJH's treatment of the first COVID-19 patient in the United States.

== Education and career ==
Compton-Phillips holds a bachelor's degree from Johns Hopkins University and a medical degree from the University of Maryland School of Medicine. She is also a board-certified internist and a CNN Medical Analyst.

In 1985 she joined Kaiser Permanente, and she moved to PSJH in 2007. PSJH has 51 hospitals and 800 clinics across seven states. She became President of Clinical Operations there and was responsible for clinical care outcomes.

In Sept 2022, Compton-Phillips left PSJH. She then joined Press Ganey as their consulting division's president and chief clinical officer.

Compton-Phillips has chaired the High Value Healthcare Collaborative and served on the boards of the Healthcare Information and Management Systems Society, Wellcare, Lumedic, the Institute of Systems Biology, and Multiscale Health Networks.

== In the news ==
Prior to the pandemic, Compton-Phillips was an active speaker about data use in healthcare and regular contributor to New England Journal of Medicine's Catalyst. She was featured in PBS Frontline's documentary, Coronavirus Pandemic, for leading Providence St. Joseph Health's treatment of the first COVID-19 patient. She regularly shared medical information about COVID-19 with the public and has since been recognized for speaking often about Providence St. Joseph's digital solutions to treat COVID-19.

Compton-Phillips was named one of 2020's top 30 healthcare IT influencers in CDW's HealthTech magazine, featured by Fierce Healthcare as one of their Women of Influence in 2020, and named one of Modern Healthcare's Top 25 Women Leaders in 2021.

== Personal life ==
Compton-Phillips is married to Louis Phillips and they have two children.
