= Amy Marie Charles =

Amy Marie Charles (December 12, 1922 – 1985) was professor of English literature at The University of North Carolina at Greensboro and a scholar of the seventeenth-century English poet George Herbert. Charles wrote a biography of the Herbert (Cornell University Press, 1977).

== Biography ==
Charles was born in Pittsburgh, Pennsylvania. She graduated cum laude from Westminster College, Pennsylvania and received her master's and doctoral degrees from the University of Pennsylvania. Before coming to Woman's College of the University of North Carolina in 1956, she taught at Westminster and was a Bloomfield Moore Fellow at the University of Pennsylvania. She taught at UNCG from her arrival in 1956 until illness prevented her from holding classes during much of 1984. Charles died in Winston-Salem in 1985.

In addition to the biography of George Herbert, Charles wrote numerous articles on Herbert and other seventeenth-century English poets, and was responsible for the publication of the facsimile of the Williams manuscript. She belonged to several professional societies. Charles founded the Friends of Bemerton and served as secretary-treasurer.
