= Amy Walker =

American actress and singer

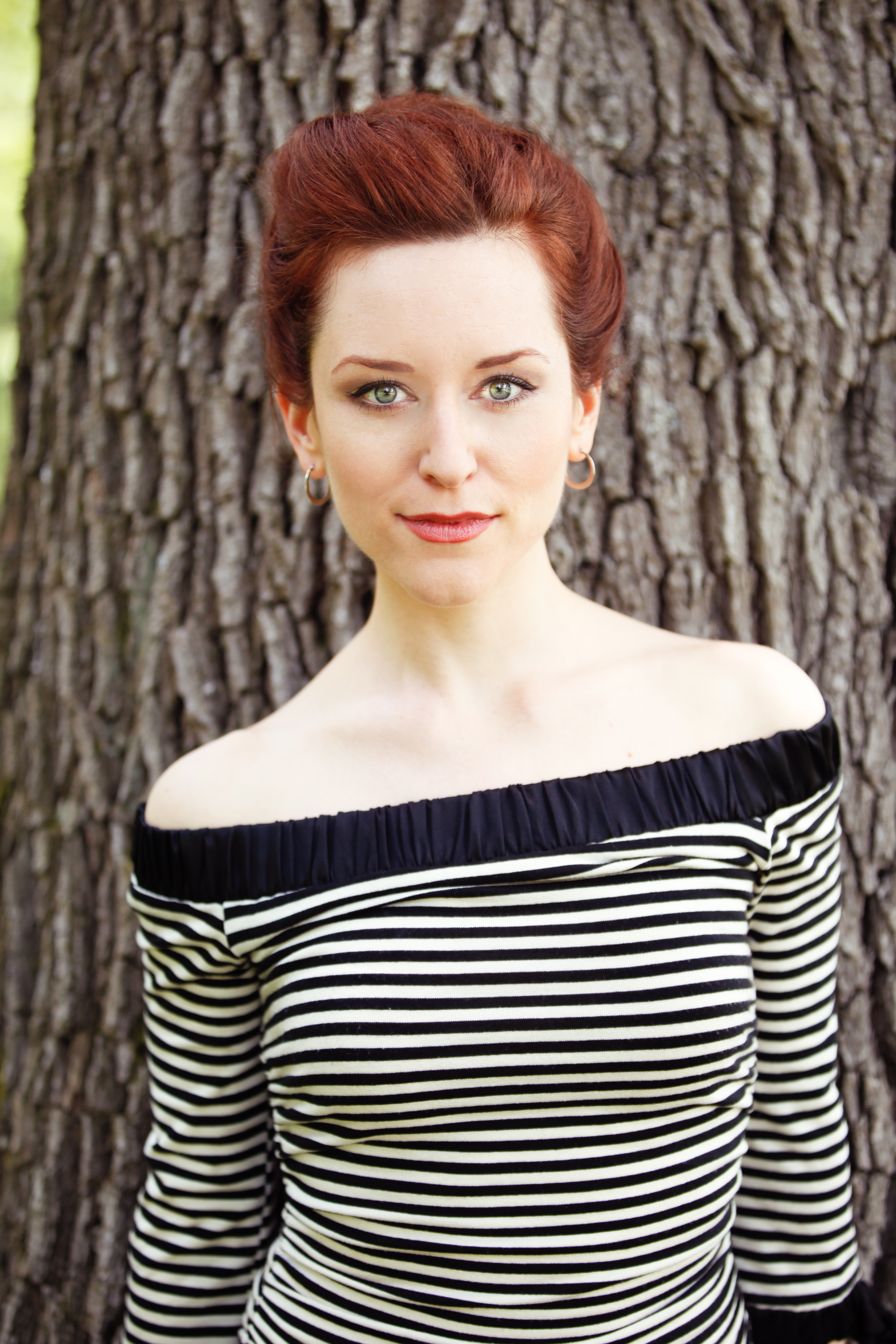
- Amy Walker in August 2013
- Education: University of Wollongong
- Occupations: Actress; singer

Instagram information
- Page: AmyWalkerOfficial
- Followers: 3.94 thousand

YouTube information
- Channel: Amy Walker
- Years active: 2007–present
- Genres: Accents; acting; vlog
- Subscribers: 182 thousand
- Views: 35.5 million
- Last updated: 23 Apr 2026
- Website: amywalkeronline.com

Amy Walker is an American actress and singer. She is best known for voicing Lunara in the video game Heroes of the Storm and a variety of characters in Fallout 76.

== Early life ==
Amy studied acting and singing at the University of Wollongong. She later settled in Wellington, and played the character Joan in the short film Dead Letters.

== Career ==
In Heroes of the Storm, Amy voiced Lunara and various characters in Fallout 76 (Miss Nanny, Beverly Solomon, Dorothy Orris, and Mawmaw). She created a YouTube video 21 Accents, which earned her appearances on both The Today Show and Inside Edition. She also partnered with Nokia as an accent expert to promote their Foreign Accent Cup.

Miss Walker performed her first original one-woman show, Amy Walker: Inside Out, in November 2007 and has since created three other original shows onstage and online.

In 2019, Amy Walker filmed two feature films, Evan Wood and Grace and Grit, both of which were released in late 2020. She also voiced Emi Terasawa in the video game, Judgment.

She learned how to paint in college.

== Discography ==
- Discourse on Accents (Third Man Records, 2011)

== Awards ==
Award nominations for Amy Walker
Year	Award	Role	Event
2008	Best Actress	"Betty" in Remember Wenn by Rupert Holmes	Discovering New Mysteries Festival
2009	Best Actress	"Pam Brent" in Personal Call by Agatha Christie	Discovering New Mysteries Festival
2009	Best Music Video	Director, "We Are Connected" (Music Video)	RainDance Short Film Festival
