= Amy Barr =

American planetary geophysicist

- Occupation: planetary geophysicist
- Employer: Planetary Science Institute

Amy Barr Mlinar is an American planetary geophysicist known for her studies of icy body formation. She is a member of the National Academies Standing Committee on Astrobiology and Planetary Science and a co-investigator on NASA's Europa Imaging System and REASON instruments.

== Early life and education ==
Born Amy Barr in Palo Alto, California, she attended Caltech for her undergraduate degree, earning a bachelor's degree in planetary science in 2000. She completed her graduate studies at the University of Colorado Boulder, earning a master's degree in 2002 and her doctorate in 2004.

== Career and research ==
She began her research career as a postdoctoral researcher at Washington University in St. Louis in 2005, then moved to the Southwest Research Institute in 2006, where she remained until 2011. She then accepted an appointment at Brown University and subsequently moved to the Planetary Science Institute in 2015, where she is a senior scientist as of 2016. Her research focuses on the formation of Callisto, seismic activity on Enceladus, and the Late Heavy Bombardment. Barr Mlinar has also completed research regarding TRAPPIST-1. She notably conducts her research and answers questions regarding Astrobiology through the use of mathematical models.In addition to being an expert in the formation and evolution of ice structures, she is a board member for the Summer Science Program, Inc. at Planetary Science Institute. Recently, she has become passionate about women equality and representation in the science department.
