= Amy Proal =

American microbiologist

- Education: Georgetown University; Murdoch University
- Known for: Long COVID research
- Scientific career
- Fields: Microbiology
- Workplaces: Autoimmunity Research Foundation; PolyBio Research Foundation
- Thesis: Autoimmune disease re-examined in light of metagenomic concepts (2012)
- Doctoral advisors: Trevor Marshall; Cassandra Berry; Douglas Eagles

Amy Proal is an American microbiologist who studies the effects of bacterial, fungal, and viral pathogens on human health at the molecular level. She is one of the founders of PolyBio Research Foundation, a company investigating the basis of chronic infection-associated illnesses, and currently serves on the company's board of directors. She has recently been noted for her work investigating the causes of long covid.

== Education ==
Proal received her Bachelor of Science in biology from Georgetown University in 2005 and later obtained her PhD in microbiology at Murdoch University in 2012. Her graduate work focused on characterizing dysregulated pathways in the context of autoimmune disease and potential avenues of treatment. Her doctoral thesis was titled "Autoimmune disease re-examined in light of metagenomic concepts".

== Career ==
Proal's decision to pursue a career in microbiology was motivated by personal experience with severe and repeated infections as a young child and later during her undergraduate studies when she was diagnosed with chronic fatigue syndrome (ME/CFS). After completing her PhD, she continued to explore the link between persistent viral pathogens in the human body and chronic illness. She became a member of the research team at the Autoimmunity Research Foundation, a California-based nonprofit, where she has published papers on autoimmunity in the context of the human microbiome, the role of host-microbe interaction in microbiome dysbiosis and inflammation, and the relationship between the pathogens driving ME/CFS and the human microbiome.

She is one of the founding members and current president/chief scientific officer of PolyBio Research Foundation, a 501(c)3 dedicated to investigating the molecular mechanisms underlying infection-associated chronic illnesses including ME/CFS, Lyme disease, and more recently Long COVID, as well as their effect on immunity, human metabolism, and inflammatory response.

Proal spearheaded the launch of the Long COVID Research Consortium in September 2022, a collaboration between scientists at premier institutions across the country, to study the fundamental causes of Long Covid.

== Discoveries ==
An idea inspired from her personal experience with ME/CFS and severe infections during the early stages of childhood, Proal began to explore pathogenesis as a driver of autoimmunity. In her paper titled "The human microbiome and autoimmunity", Proal discusses how the accumulation of pathogens in the human microbiome perturb gene transcription, translation, and metabolic process. The paper also proposes that autoimmune diseases may be the result of the inheritance of a specific microbiome composition rather than "Mendelian inheritance of genetic abnormalities”.

Proal has also authored several chapters of books written for the J.Craig Venter Institute. One of the chapters she wrote in the book titled "Infection and Autoimmunity" states that intracellular microbes tamper with key metabolic pathways by gradually dysregulating gene expression. She explains that the expression of the Vitamin D receptor is altered in many inflammatory conditions since Vitamin D is an immunosuppressive steroid which dampens the innate immune response, allowing pathogens to proliferate more easily.

More recently, she has been launching research efforts to study the aftereffects of Long COVID. She and her research team have recently documented in the article "Long COVID or post-acute sequelae of COVID-19 (PASC): an overview of biological factors that may contribute to persistent symptoms" some of the factors that may give rise to Long COVID symptoms, including Sars-Cov-2 injury to one or multiple organs, reservoirs of the virus in tissues, and an viral induced immunosuppressive environment.

== Notable works ==
- "Long COVID or post-acute sequelae of COVID-19 (PASC): an overview of biological factors that may contribute to persistent symptoms" (2021)
- "Pathogens Hijack Host Cell Metabolism: Intracellular Infection as a Driver of the Warburg Effect in Cancer and Other Chronic Inflammatory Conditions" (2020)
- "Myalgic Encephalomyelitis/Chronic Fatigue Syndrome in the Era of the Human Microbiome: Persistent Pathogens Drive Chronic Symptoms by Interfering With Host Metabolism, Gene Expression, and Immunity" (2018)
- "Microbe-microbe and host-microbe interactions drive microbiome dysbiosis and inflammatory processes" (2017)
- "Infection, Autoimmunity, and Vitamin D" (2015)
- "Autoimmune disease re-examined in light of metagenomic concepts" (2012)
