= Amy J. Clarke =

American metallurgist

Amy J. Clarke is an American metallurgist whose research has involved "physical metallurgy and making, measuring, and modeling metallic alloys during processing to realize advanced manufacturing", including both high-strength steel and alloys of uranium. She holds joint appointments as a distinguished scientist at the Los Alamos National Laboratory Sigma Manufacturing Science Division, and as a research faculty member in the George S. Ansell Department of Metallurgical and Materials Engineering at the Colorado School of Mines.

== Education and career ==
Clarke grew up in Houghton, Michigan, and became an undergraduate at Michigan Technological University in Houghton, where her parents were both alumni. She graduated with a bachelor's degree in metallurgical and materials engineering in 2000. Next, she went to the Colorado School of Mines for graduate study, receiving a master's degree and Ph.D. for research on steel. Her 2006 doctoral dissertation, Carbon partitioning into austenite from martensite in a silicon-containing high strength sheet steel, was supervised by John G. Speer.

She joined the Los Alamos National Laboratory as a G.T. Seaborg Institute Postdoctoral Fellow, before returning to the Colorado School of Mines as a faculty member. There, she became John Henry Moore Endowed Chair of Metallurgy and co-director of the Center for Advanced Non-Ferrous Structural Alloys. She subsequently returned to Los Alamos, retaining a joint appointment as research faculty at the Colorado School of Mines.

== Recognition ==
Clarke was the 2007 recipient of the Willy Korf Award for Young Excellence for her doctoral dissertation. She was a 2011 recipient of the Presidential Early Career Award for Scientists and Engineers. Michigan Technological University named her as an Outstanding Young Alumna in 2013.

She was named as a Fellow of ASM International in 2018. She was one of six 2020 Brimacombe Medalists of The Minerals, Metals & Materials Society, honored "for profound and lasting contributions to materials science through the use of advanced techniques, educating and mentoring the next generation, and dedicated service to TMS".
