= Amy Chaplin =

Australian American chef and cookbook writer

- Born: 1974 or 1975 (age 50–51); New South Wales, Australia
- Culinary career
- Cooking style: Vegetarian & Vegan
- Awards won: 2015 James Beard Award; 2020 James Beard Award

Amy Chaplin is an Australian-American vegetarian and vegan chef, recipe developer and cookbook writer. Her first cookbook, At Home in the Whole Food Kitchen, was a 2015 James Beard Award winner. Her Whole Food Cooking Every Day was a 2020 James Beard Award winner.

== Early life ==
Chaplin was born and raised in New South Wales, Australia, where she grew up in a mudbrick home on a farm near Dundurrabin, a small town between Dorrigo and Grafton in the New England region. She told an interviewer "There were no shops within a 50-km radius of where we lived." The family grew their own produce and raised chickens, and her mother made tofu and her father baked sourdough bread.

== Career ==
Chaplin worked in a cafe in Sydney and in the 1990s as a pastry chef in Amsterdam. She moved to London in 1995 and then to New York in 1999. In 2003 she began working at Angelica Kitchen, a vegan restaurant in Manhattan, three days a week as a pastry chef and became executive chef about a year later. She left Angelica Kitchen in 2010.

Chaplin had planned to open a restaurant in Tribeca in the spring of 2020, but plans were put on hold due to the COVID-19 pandemic.

Chaplin also has worked as a private and consultant chef; clients have included Natalie Portman, Liv Tyler, and Anna Deavere Smith.

== Reception ==
The New York Times called Chaplin's approach to vegetarian cooking "deeply thoughtful". The Washington Post's Joe Yonan wrote, "Some cookbook authors have earned my complete trust, and Amy Chaplin is one of them."

=== Accolades ===
Chaplin's first cookbook, At Home in the Whole Food Kitchen, was a 2015 James Beard Award winner. The Times called it "a sneaker" because it "arrived quietly from a small press, then won a James Beard Award".

Her Whole Food Cooking Every Day was a 2020 James Beard Award winner. Epicurious called it "the ideal building block book for anyone with dietary restrictions". Bon Appétit listed it as one of their best fall cookbooks of 2019. Vogue named it to their list of cookbooks everyone should own.

- Whole Food Cooking Every Day: Transform the Way You Eat with 250 Vegetarian Recipes Free of Gluten, Dairy, and Refined Sugar. Artisan, 2019.
- At Home in the Whole Food Kitchen: Celebrating the Art of Eating Well. Roost Books, 2014.

== Personal life ==
As of 2014 Chaplin was living in Manhattan's East Village. As of 2019 she was dividing her time between Brooklyn and upstate New York. As of 2020 Chaplin lived in the Hudson Valley of New York. She has a son.
