= Amy Stokes Barton =

American ophthalmologist

- Born: October 1, 1841; Camden County
- Died: March 19, 1900 (aged 58); Philadelphia
- Education: Doctor of Medicine
- Alma mater: Woman's Medical College of Pennsylvania
- Occupation: Ophthalmologist
- Employer: Wills Eye Hospital; Woman's Medical College of Pennsylvania
- Position held: professor (1891–1897), lecturer (1885–1890)

Amy Stokes Barton (October 1, 1841 – March 19, 1900), a pioneer woman ophthalmologist, was born in Camden County, New Jersey, October 1, 1841, daughter of Joseph Barton, a farmer, and Rachel B. Evans.

She graduated at the Woman's Medical College of Pennsylvania in 1874, and after serving a term in the hospital connected with the college, began practicing medicine in Philadelphia. In 1875, Barton was one of about thirty graduates who met to form an alumnae association.

Bartib became interested in the eye, and after some difficulties due her gender, she was admitted to work in the Wills Eye Hospital, and assisted George Strawbridge for thirteen years, until his resignation in 1890.

In addition to her work in ophthalmology, Barton published reports on gynecology that were listed in the Index Medicus.

In the Woman's Medical College, she was a lecturer on ophthalmology, 1885–1890, and was appointed a clinical professor of ophthalmology in 1891, a position she held until 1897. She may have been the first woman in the United States to be elected to a professorship of ophthalmology.

Barton collected the money for and founded a dispensary in connection with the Woman's College in Philadelphia, feeling that too much stress was being put upon the teaching of obstetrics and gynecology to women, and wishing a place where clinics in all branches would be held. It was opened in 1895 at 1212 South Third Street, and was later at 333 and 335 Washington Avenue, being called the Amy S. Barton Dispensary.

Barton was an Orthodox Friend. She died in Philadelphia, March 19, 1900, from apoplexy. She left her surgical and medical instruments to the doctors who treated her mortal illness.
