= Amy Charkowski =

American plant pathologist

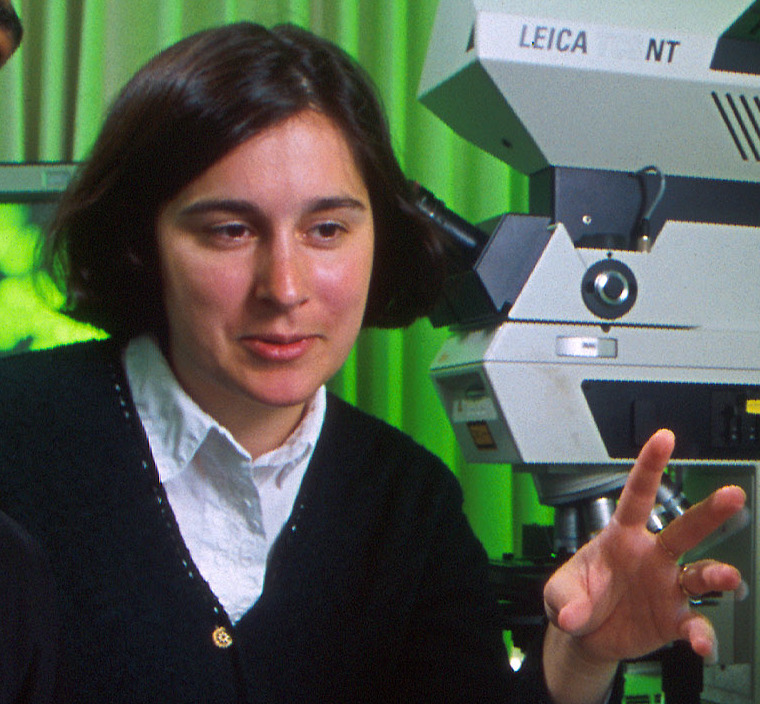
- Charkowski in 2000
- Born: Amy Olymbia Charkowski; January 24, 1971 (age 54)
- Education: University of Wisconsin-Madison (BS); Cornell University (PhD)
- Scientific career
- Thesis: Pseudomonas syringae HRP gene pathogenicity islands. (1998)
- Website: Charkwoski Lab

Amy Olymbia Charkowski is an American plant pathologist and Professor of Plant Pathology at Colorado State University. She was elected Fellow of the American Association for the Advancement of Science in 2020.

== Early life and education ==
Charkowski was born in Madison. She stayed close to home for her undergraduate studies, focussing on biochemistry and plant pathology at the University of Wisconsin–Madison. Whilst she had long been interested in biology, it was during her undergraduate degree that she first worked in a plant virology laboratory. She has recalled visiting the hydroponic farms at Epcot with her family. Her first undergraduate research experience involved bean and pepper diseases. After earning her bachelor's degree she moved to Cornell University, where she studied the hypersensitive response and pathogenicity system. After graduating she worked at the United States Department of Agriculture research service where she worked on food safety research.

== Research and career ==
After a short spell at the USDA Charkowski returned to the University of Wisconsin–Madison, where she studied how microbes manipulate plants. As part of her role at the University of Wisconsin–Madison, Charkowski directs the Wisconsin Seed Potato Certification program, which oversees the certification of seeds produced by farmers in Wisconsin. Wisconsin growers are responsible for the production of around $16 million worth of seed potatoes planted across the United States per year, with around 8% of United States potatoes able to be traced back to the Charkowski's program. Her innovations with the Wisconsin Seed Potato Certification programme include ensuring the laws surrounding seed production meet international standards, the implementation of a hydroponics programme and applying scientific programmes to detect for potato pathogens. As part of these efforts, Charkowski leads the $8.3M USDA Specialty Crops Research Initiative.

Charkowski has worked to understand and control the broad host range pathogens Pectobacterium and Dickeya. These diseases attack potato crops in Wisconsin, causing potatoes to rot. Charkowski has sequenced the genome of the Pectobacterium taxa, allowing systematic investigations into the role of the bacterial genes that are up-regulated in rotating tubers.

In her investigations of the genome of Pectobacterium, Charkowski identified that the bacteria delivered a single effector protein (DspE) into host cells. In plants that can recognise the effector protein, DspE can trigger a resistive response. Certain species of potato can resist the killing effects of the DspE whilst simultaneously attacking the Pectobacterium. She has tried to move the defensive genes that can recognise DspE into other potatoes and crop plants as a means to destroy pathogens. In 2016 Charkowski moved to Colorado State University as Professor and department chair.

== Awards and honours ==
- 2011 American Phytopathological Society Syngenta Award
- 2016 Elected Fellow of the American Phytopathological Society
- 2020 Elected Fellow of the American Association for the Advancement of Science

== Select publications ==
- Alfano, James R.; Charkowski, Amy O.; Deng, Wen-Ling; Badel, Jorge L.; Petnicki-Ocwieja, Tanja; Dijk, Karin van; Collmer, Alan (2000-04-25). "The Pseudomonas syringae Hrp pathogenicity island has a tripartite mosaic structure composed of a cluster of type III secretion genes bounded by exchangeable effector and conserved effector loci that contribute to parasitic fitness and pathogenicity in plants". Proceedings of the National Academy of Sciences. 97 (9): 4856–4861. Bibcode:2000PNAS...97.4856A. doi:10.1073/pnas.97.9.4856. ISSN 0027-8424. PMC 18322. PMID 10781092.
- Ma, Bing; Hibbing, Michael E.; Kim, Hye-Sook; Reedy, Ralph M.; Yedidia, Iris; Breuer, Jane; Breuer, Jeffrey; Glasner, Jeremy D.; Perna, Nicole T.; Kelman, Arthur; Charkowski, Amy O. (2007-08-09). "Host Range and Molecular Phylogenies of the Soft Rot Enterobacterial Genera Pectobacterium and Dickeya". Phytopathology. 97 (9): 1150–1163. Bibcode:2007PhPat..97.1150M. doi:10.1094/PHYTO-97-9-1150. ISSN 0031-949X. PMID 18944180.
- Barak, Jeri D.; Gorski, Lisa; Naraghi-Arani, Pejman; Charkowski, Amy O. (2005-10-01). "Salmonella enterica Virulence Genes Are Required for Bacterial Attachment to Plant Tissue". Applied and Environmental Microbiology. 71 (10): 5685–5691. Bibcode:2005ApEnM..71.5685B. doi:10.1128/AEM.71.10.5685-5691.2005. ISSN 0099-2240. PMC 1265987. PMID 16204476.

== Personal life ==
Charkowski is married. She is a passionate explorer, and takes part in hiking, biking and kayaking.
