= Amy Skubitz =

American immunologist

- Spouse: Keith Skubitz

Academic background
- Education: BSc, Biochmeistry, 1980, University of Maryland, College Park; PhD, Pharmacology and Experimental Therapeutics, 1984, Johns Hopkins University
- Thesis: Identification and characterization of immunogenic schistosoma glycoproteins that are species-specific, stage-specific, or react with sera from hosts infected with other parasites (1984)

Amy Patrice Norden Skubitz is an American immunologist. At the University of Minnesota, Skubitz and her research team at the Ovarian Cancer Early Detection Program used new technology to test patients blood, leading to numerous findings.

== Early life and education ==
Skubitz was born to parents Roger L. and Catherine Norden and grew up in Maryland with four siblings. She became interested in early cancer detection when her mother was diagnosed with ovarian cancer. Skubitz completed her Bachelor of Science degree at her hometown University of Maryland, College Park and her PhD in Pharmacology and Experimental Therapeutics at Johns Hopkins University. Upon earning her PhD, Skubitz completed postdoctoral work in Laboratory Medicine and Pathology at the University of Minnesota (UMN) and joined their faculty of immunology.

== Career ==
While working at UMN, Skubitz joined Rein In Sarcoma (RIS), a Minnesota non-profit organization dedicated to sarcoma patient support, research, and education, through her leadership of the Cancer Center Tissue Procurement Facility in 1995. She eventually collaborated with her husband, Keith Skubitz. In 2014, Skubitz led a project with the goal "to identify ovarian cancer biomarkers in the normal pap test that’s always done routinely." At the time, UMN believed her study could be five to 10 years away from also finding ovarian cancer.

In 2019, Skubitz and her research team co-developed a new blood test for Ovarian cancer which found five new biomarkers linked to the disease. When these biomarkers were found at elevated levels in a woman's blood, it signalled the presence of ovarian cancer. She was the recipient of the 2019 Cookie Laughlin Pilot Study Award for her research on early detection of ovarian cancer. Later, she began concentrating on a set of 30 proteins found in the Pap smears of women with ovarian cancer to see if those proteins could be the indicator.
