= Amy Suehiro =

Japanese entomologist (1906–1968)

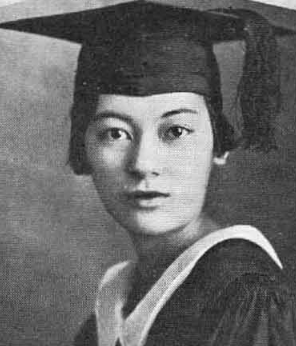
- Amy Suehiro, from the 1927 yearbook of the University of Hawai'i
- Born: May 29, 1906; Fukuoka, Japan
- Died: January 27, 1968 (aged 61)
- Occupation: Entomologist
- Relatives: J. T. Gulick (grandfather)

Amy Suehiro (May 29, 1906 – January 27, 1968) was a Japanese-American entomologist, based at the Bishop Museum in Hawai'i.

== Early life and education ==
Suehiro was born in Japan. Her mother, Hannah Gulick Suehiro, was the adopted daughter of American missionary and naturalist J. T. Gulick; she was a piano teacher and school principal in Japan, and an educator in Hawaii.

Suehiro attended Hilo High School. She graduated from the University of Hawai'i in 1927, and earned a master's degree there in 1936. Her thesis was titled "A Revision of the Genus Pseudococcus in the Hawaiian Islands" (1936). Like her mother, Suehiro was musical, and she sang in the University of Hawaii's Women's Glee Club, as an alto.

== Career ==
Suehiro was an entomologist and curator of entomological collections at the Bernice P. Bishop Museum in Honolulu. She managed the preservation and storage of specimens, and compiled, maintained, and annotated a card catalog of insects in the South Pacific, and helped other entomologists with finding and identifying species in the region. She spoke about her work to community groups, and newspaper stories about insects in Hawaii included her comments, given as an expert on the subject.

She was a member of the executive board of the Japanese Women's University Club in Honolulu. She was elected treasurer of the Hawaiian Entomological Society in 1959.

== Publications ==
- "Insects of Honaunau" (1957)
- "Insects of Moku Manu Inlet" (1959)
- "Insects and other arthropods from Midway Atoll" (1960)

== Personal life and legacy ==
Suehiro lived and traveled with her mother. Hannah Gulick Suehiro died in 1967, and Amy Suehiro died in 1968, at the age of 61. The Amy Suehiro Memorial Fund at the Bishop Museum supported the publication of the Catalog of Entomological Types in the Bishop Museum.
