= Amy Richau =

American writer

- Occupations: Writer, encyclopedist
- Writing career
- Language: English

Amy Richau is an American writer. She is the founder of the website 365 Star Wars, which focuses on giving visibility to women in the Star Wars universe.

== Biography ==
Richau developed an interest in the American science fiction saga Star Wars from a very early age and, during her childhood, she went to the cinema to see the film Star Wars: Episode IV - A New Hope, which was released in 1977. During her adult years, she began writing for websites such as Screen Rant and Nerdist, and contributed to the creation of the docuseries Looking for Leia. After this, she was hired to write for the StarWars.com website, and in 2021 she released her first book, Star Wars: I Love You. I Know. In 2022, she published the official Star Wars: The High Republic Show encyclopedia in collaboration with Megan Crouse, focusing on the characters, places and events of the multimedia initiative Star Wars: The High Republic. The cover art was done by artist Phil Noto.

A new official Star Wars encyclopedia was announced for release in January 2024. The encyclopedia was to be published in September, and to be written by Amy Richau along with authors Dan Brooks, Megan Crouse, Kelly Knox, Amy Ratcliffe, Brandon Wainerdi, and Dan Zehr.

== Bibliography ==
- Star Wars I Love You. I Know.: Lessons in Love and Friendship (2021)
- Star Wars I Am Your Father: Lessons for Parents, Protectors, and Mentors (2021)
- Star Wars Timelines (2023)
- Star Wars The High Republic Character Encyclopedia
- LEGO Marvel Visual Dictionary (2023)
