= Amy Nelson Burnett =

American historian (born 1957)

- Born: 1957 (age 68–69)
- Education: University of Wisconsin-Madison
- Occupations: historian, author
- Scientific career
- Fields: Early modern European history
- Workplaces: University of Nebraska–Lincoln

Amy Nelson Burnett (born 1957) is an American historian, author and academic who specializes in early modern European history.

== Biography ==
She was born in 1957.

She is married to Stephen Burnett and has two children with him.

== Education ==
She completed her Bachelor of Arts Degree in Economics in 1979 at the University of Wisconsin-Madison, a Master of Arts Degree in History in 1984 at the same university, and a Ph.D. in History in 1989 at the same university.

== Career ==
She is currently the Paula and D.B. Varner University Professor of History at the University of Nebraska–Lincoln.

== Awards and honours ==
She has been a visiting scholar at the Institute for Advanced Study in Princeton, New Jersey in 2009. She has received fellowships from the American Philosophical society in 2010 and the Alexander von Humboldt Foundation in 2001–2004.

In 2012, she became a Fulbright Senior Scholar at the Leibniz-Institute für Europäische Geschichte in Mainz, Germany. She has also received a Solmsen Fellowship from the Institute for Research in the Humanities at the University of Wisconsin–Madison in 2020–21.

Lastly, she has received the John Simon Guggenheim Memorial Foundation Fellowship in 2021.

== Bibliography ==
She is the author of a number of notable books:

- The Collected Works of Erasmus
- The Yoke of Christ: Martin Bucer and Christian Discipline
- Karlstadt and the Origins of the Eucharistic Controversy: A Study in the Circulation of Ideas
- Luther, learning, and the liberal arts
- Debating the Sacraments: Print and Authority in the Early Reformation
- John Calvin, Myth and Reality: Image and Impact of Geneva’s Reformer.

== See also ==
- Erasmus
- Martin Bucer
