= Amy Singer =

American psychologist

- Born: September 8, 1953 (age 73)
- Education: Hofstra University
- Occupations: Trial consultant and research psychologist

Amy Singer (born September 8, 1953) is a Florida trial consultant and research psychologist. Singer's firm, Trial Consultants, Inc., which she founded in Miami in 1979, is one of the first trial consulting firms in the United States. Singer is an acknowledged authority in the field of litigation psychology, a discipline she helped pioneer. Her revolutionary approach, which consists of applying principles of psychology and using open-ended questions to elicit jurors’ value beliefs regarding key trial issues, changed the way that attorneys around the United States conduct voir dire. Largely through Singer's influence, this became a juror de-selection, not selection, process.

Singer is a leader in the application of neuro-linguistic programming (NLP) by attorneys to influence jurors. Singer also is believed to be the first person to conduct a shadow jury on television, which she did for A Current Affair in its coverage of the William Kennedy Smith rape trial in Palm Beach, Florida, in 1991.

Singer is a 1975 graduate of Hofstra University, Hempstead, New York. She received her Master of Arts (1977) and her doctorate (1978) at Hofstra in applied research psychology. Singer is licensed in clinical psychology in New York. She is a past instructor in psychology at Nova Southeastern University, Fort Lauderdale, and Florida International University, Miami-Dade County, Florida.

Singer has worked as an author, trial consultant, and speaker, and has contributed to national publications, broadcast media, and legal associations. Her work has included involvement in cases such as the Casey Anthony, Dr. Jack Kevorkian, Michael Jackson, William Kennedy Smith, and O. J. Simpson trials.

In her most recent innovative strategy, Singer analyzed over 40,000 blog posts and tweets relating to the Casey Anthony trial. Singer was the first trial consultant to use social media as a strategy.

== Bibliography ==
- Trials and Deliberations: Inside the Jury Room, published in 1992 by Shepards/McGraw-Hill.
- “Dealing with Biased Jurors During Voir Dire,” TRIAL, April 1996
- “Jury-Validated Trial Themes,” TRIAL, October 1994
- “Cueing Positive Memory Recall with Jurors,” TRIAL, October 1994
- “The Best Jury Research Format to Test Trial Themes,” TRIAL, October 199
- “Exploding the Myths Concerning Voir Dire,” Los Angeles Daily Journal
- “Getting Jurors to Deliberate in Front of You,” Lawyers Weekly USA, May 22, 1995
- “Litigation Intelligence Surveys,” The Academy of Florida Trial Lawyers Journal
- “Trial Consulting for the Smaller Practitioner,” The Florida Bar News, January 15, 1996
- “Intellectual Property Cases Require Strong Themes,” The Law Works
- “Picking a Jury in a Civil Case in Ohio,” co-authored with Jeffrey D. Boyd, McCarthy, Palmer, Volkema, Boyd, and Thomas, Ohio Trial
- “Trial Consulting,” The Journal of Legal Nurse Consulting
- “Don’t Make Voir Dire So Difficult,” The Advocate
- “Using Psychology to Win in Court,” Trial Diplomacy Journal
- “Successfully Settling the Case Through Surveys,” TRIAL
- “Professionally Prepared for Witness Preparations?” TRIAL
- “Exposing and Eliminating Biased Jurors During Voir Dire,” Leader's Product Liability Law and Strategy, October 1997
- “Litigation Intelligence Surveys: Essential for Large Products Liability Trials,” Leader's Product Liability Law and Strategy
- “Connecting and Communicating with the Catastrophically Injured Plaintiff,” TRIAL, June 1998
- “Selecting Jurors: What to Do About Bias,” TRIAL, April 1996
- “Voir Dire in Employment Law Cases,” Inside Employee Rights Litigation
- “Trial Consulting for the Smaller Practitioner,” Florida Bar News
- “Voir Dire in Employment Law Cases,” Employee Rights Litigation.
