= Amy Sadao =

Art institution director, writer, juror, and lecturer (born 1971)

- Born: 1971 (age 54–55); Los Angeles, California
- Education: B.F.A., Cooper Union School of Art, 1995; M.A., Comparative Ethnic Studies University of California, Berkeley, 2000

Amy Sadao is a contemporary art curator and nonprofit consultant who was director of the Institute of Contemporary Art in Philadelphia from September 2012 to September 2019. Sadao was executive director of Visual AIDS in New York City prior to her appointment to the ICA directorship. She has been known to engage diverse communities and to center art around the contemporary social and political issues across the globe.

== Biography ==
Born in California in 1971, Sadao grew up in Huntington Beach, California. She received her BFA from the Cooper Union School of Art in 1995 and an MA in comparative ethnic studies from the University of California, Berkeley in 2000.

== Career ==
Sadao began her career in museums as a curatorial intern at the Whitney Museum of American Art. At the Whitney museum, she worked with curator, Thelma Golden.

Sadao was the executive director of Visual AIDS in New York City for ten years, from 2002 through 2012. During her time at Visual AIDS, she increased outreach and expanded available resources surrounding HIV/AIDS to encourage discussion and support of HIV+ artists. In June 2012, she became the Director of the Institute of Contemporary Art (ICA).

University of Pennsylvania President Amy Gutmann and Provost Vincent Price announced her appointment to a directorship named for Daniel W. Dietrich II, honoring his substantial financial gift in 2005. In 2015, he also gave a US$10 million endowment to the university in support of its curatorial program and to help bring artists to Philadelphia. Describing her as "a leader of unparalleled energy and vision", Gutmann commented, "She has an especially strong commitment to forging collaborations across a wide range of diverse communities and placing art at the center of dialogue about the most significant intellectual, political, and social issues of the contemporary world." Price said, "I have been particularly impressed by her understanding of the role of art in a research university – and in catalyzing intellectual and interdisciplinary inquiry in general – as well as by the knowledge she brings of Penn and Philadelphia."

She was elected to the board of the Pennsylvania Humanities Council in 2015.

== Awards ==
- 2014: ArtTable New Leadership Awards
