= Amy Toungara =

Ivorian politician (born 1944)

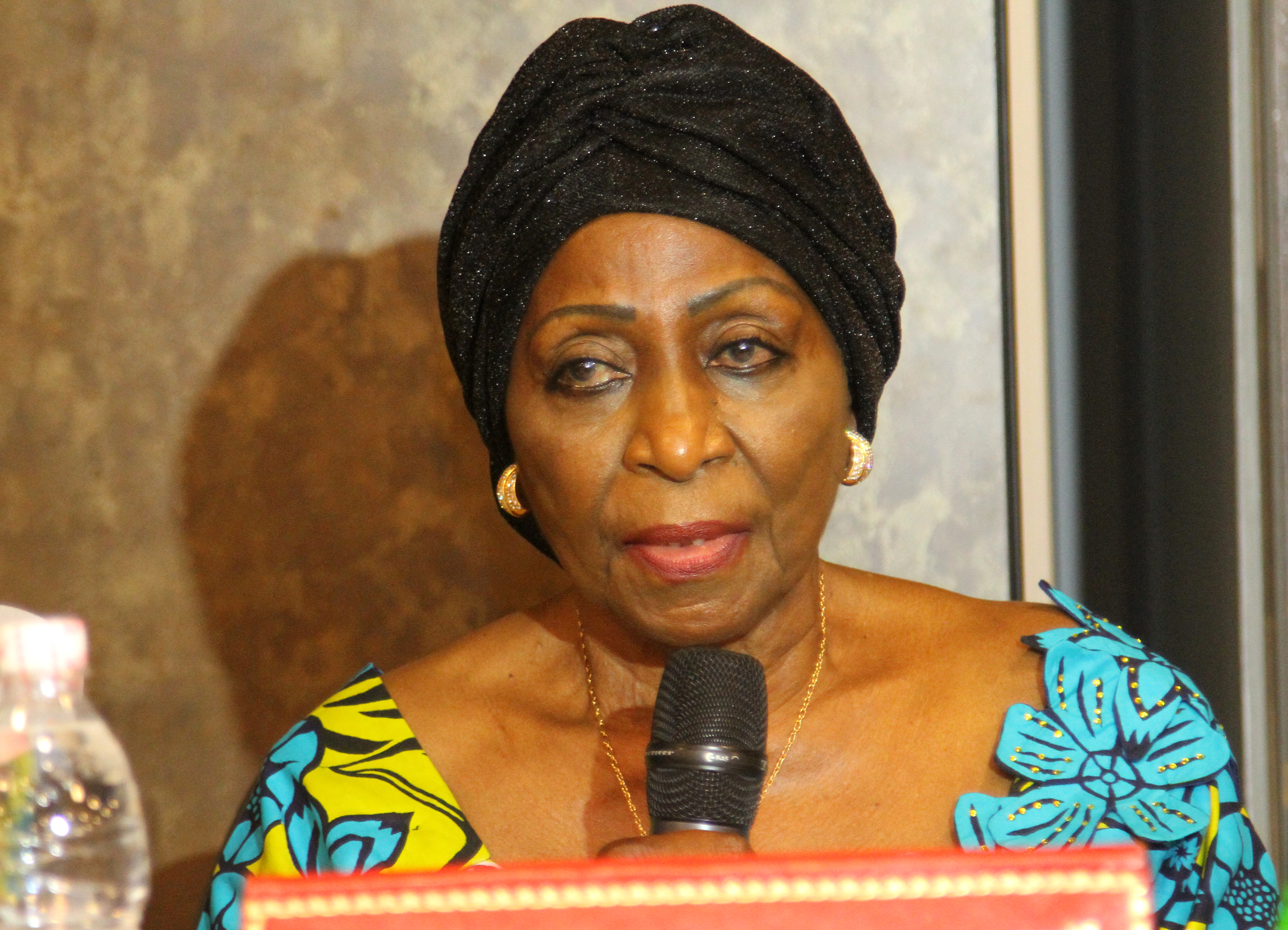

Member of the National Assembly
- Incumbent
- Assumed office 2011
- Constituency: Treichville

Personal details
- Born: 1944 (age 81–82) Côte d'Ivoire
- Party: RDR
- Spouse: Adama Toungara

Amy Toungara (born 1944) is an Ivorian politician who has served as a member of the National Assembly, representing the Treichville constituency, since 2011. She is the wife of Adama Toungara, the former Minister of Energy and Petroleum of Côte d'Ivoire.

== Biography ==
Amy Toungara is one of the most influential female politicians in Côte d'Ivoire. A former employee of the defunct Air Ivoire, she is well known among militants and executives of the Rassemblement des Républicains (RDR) and is part of the inner circle of associates of Dominique Ouattara. Having been involved in all the struggles alongside her husband, Adama Toungara, a historical cadre of the party (RDR), she won the position of deputy in the Treichville constituency, a commune in southern Abidjan, in 2011 following the rise to power of Alassane Ouattara. She was re-elected in the 2016 legislative elections and was considered for the Vice-Presidency of the National Assembly of Côte d'Ivoire in 2017 on behalf of the RDR, but was not selected. However, she emerged victorious in Treichville in the March 2021 legislative elections, representing the Rassemblement des Houphouetistes pour la Démocratie et la Paix (RHDP).
