= Amy Bagshaw =

British artistic gymnast (born 1988)

- Born: 10 October 1988 (age 37)

Gymnastics career
- Discipline: Women's artistic gymnastics
- Country represented: Great Britain; England
- Club: Park Wrekin College
- Retired: September 2003

Amy Louise Bagshaw (born 10 October 1988) is an international gymnast from Shropshire, Great Britain. She competed for the Great Britain team five times, the England team two times and was British National Champion at the age of 11. She went on to compete for Great Britain in Canada but had to retire from gymnastics in September 2005 due to an injury. A member of the 2004 Olympic training squad.

Amy trained at Park Wrekin College Gymnastics Club based in Telford, Shropshire. She was a gymnast for 12 years and was on her way to compete for a spot at the Olympics. She has written an unpublished autobiography and classes meeting Kylie Minogue and Tony Blair as amongst her achievements,
