= Amy Borkowsky =

American author and comedian

Amy Borkowsky is an American author and comedian. Based in New York City, she is known for the two-volume comedy CDs Amy's Answering Machine: Messages from Mom, collections of actual messages from her overprotective mother. The CDs were launched in an interview with Matt Lauer on Today in 2000.

== Coverage ==
Media coverage for Amy's Answering Machine includes airplay on hundreds of radio stations and on National Public Radio. Amy performs her comedy act and speaks at a variety of events across the United States. She is also the author of the Amy's Answering Machine book.

== Projects ==
Amy is also the creator of the Cellibacy project, a media event in which she gave up her cell phone for sixty days, and she is the author of Statements: True Tales of Life, Love, and Credit Card Bills, a collection of true stories she remembered when she looked back at the charges on ten years of American Express credit card bills. "Every purchase tells a story".
