= Amy Pritchett =

American aerospace engineer

Amy Ruth Pritchett is an American aerospace engineer whose research concerns human–machine interaction in aeronautical and flight control applications. She is a professor at Pennsylvania State University, where she heads the Department of Aerospace Engineering.

== Education and career ==
Pritchett majored in Aeronautics And Astronautics at the Massachusetts Institute of Technology (MIT), specializing in avionics. She earned a bachelor's degree at MIT in 1992, a master's degree there in 1994, and a Ph.D. in 1996. Her doctoral dissertation, Pilot Non-Conformance to Alerting Systems Commands During Closely-Spaced Parallel Approaches, was supervised by R. John Hansman.

In 1997 she became an assistant professor at Georgia Tech, jointly appointed in the Departments of Aerospace Engineering and Industrial & Systems Engineering. She was promoted to associate professor in 2003, named as David S. Lewis Associate Professor of Cognitive Engineering in 2005, and later became the David S. Lewis Professor, with two years on leave as director of the NASA Aviation Safety Program from 2008 to 2009, before moving to Penn State as department chair in 2017.

== Recognition ==
Pritchett was named as a Fellow of the American Institute of Aeronautics and Astronautics in 2020. She is also a Fellow of the Human Factors and Ergonomics Society.
