= Amy Pyle =

American journalist and media executive

Amy Pyle is an American journalist and media executive. She has worked for a number of high-profile organizations, including USA TODAY as Managing Editor of Investigations & Storytelling, The Center for Investigative Reporting as Editor-in-Chief, The Sacramento Bee as Assistant Managing Editor/Projects & Investigations, the Los Angeles Times as Assistant City Editor.

She contributed to two Pulitzer Prize-winning teams, and has overseen teams that have earned Pulitzer finalist nominations, a George Foster Peabody award, and a George Polk award among many others.

== Early life and education ==
Pyle obtained a BA in French from Mills College and a master's degree in journalism at Northwestern University.

According her alma mater, Pyle says "The chance to study at an historic women’s college also provided an advantage.... 'You can’t undervalue the strength of being at an institution where the editor of the paper is always a woman and the president is always a woman,' Pyle says. 'It was empowering.'"

== Career ==
In 2018, the California News Publishers Association reported that "Amy Pyle, editor in chief at The Center for Investigative Reporting in Emeryville, joins Gannett's USA Today Network as head of investigations." They noted that Pyle had previously been with the CIR since 2012.

Under her leadership at the CIR, reporters Amy Julia Harris and Shoshana Walter were named finalists for the Pulitzer Prize in the national reporting category today for their investigation into forced labor at drug rehabilitation centers.

Of the Pulitzer nomination, Pyle said "We're so proud of Amy Julia and Shoshana; they've worked tirelessly on this story and they're not done."

Likewise, Stanford University's Journalism Program noted that "under her editorial leadership, the organization has won a George Foster Peabody award for its investigation into opiate prescriptions by the U.S. Department of Veterans Affairs. That work has also prompted Congressional hearings."

They also noted that Pyle, "along with the LA Times staff, won the 1995 Pulitzer Prize for spot news writing for coverage of the earthquake that rocked the city in the previous year."

During her career as a media executive Pyle has spoken at a variety of institutions. Occidental College wrote up some of her views on journalism, which she shared at a 2017 panel with Ewin Chemerinsky and Salam Al-Marayati:

Mainstream journalists constantly wrestle not only with how to define objective journalism, but what their First Amendment rights are as individuals and what that means for their reporting, Pyle said.

Mere balance in news coverage is not the goal, Pyle said."I don’t think talking heads, one on each side, gets us very far." Objective journalism is fact-based, and journalists should not be advocates, but strive to maintain neutrality. "I talked a lot about this with the newspaper [the student-run Occidental Weekly] today. Campus journalists are feeling their way through this issue, that sometimes you wear two hats, protestor and journalist. I believe you can’t wear both at the same time."

== Awards and honors ==
- Contributor to two Pulitzer Prize-winning teams.
- Has overseen teams which have earned Pulitzer finalist nominations, a George Foster Peabody award, and a George Polk award.
