= Amy Blakemore =

American photographer

Amy Blakemore (born 1958) is an American photographer. Blakemore was born in Tulsa, Oklahoma.

Blakemore was included in the 2006 Whitney Biennial. Her work is included in the collections of the Museum of Fine Arts, Houston and the Seattle Art Museum. In 2015, she was named the Texas Artist of the Year.
