= Amy Cardinal Christianson =

Métis fire scientist

- Born: 1981 (age 44–45)
- Education: University of Alberta (BSc (Hons), PhD)
- Known for: First Nations wildfire evacuation research; Indigenous fire stewardship and cultural burning advocacy; Good Fire podcast
- Awards: SSHRC Impact Award (Connection Award, 2025); Lynn Orstad Award: Women in Wildfire Resiliency (2025)
- Scientific career
- Fields: Wildfire evacuation research; Indigenous fire stewardship
- Workplaces: Indigenous Leadership Initiative; Canadian Forest Service (Natural Resources Canada); Parks Canada

Amy Cardinal Christianson (born 1981) is a Métis fire scientist and policy advisor whose work focuses on Indigenous fire stewardship and wildfire evacuations in Canada. She is a Senior Fire Advisor with the Indigenous Leadership Initiative (ILI). She previously worked as a research scientist with the Canadian Forest Service (Natural Resources Canada) and as an Indigenous fire specialist with Parks Canada’s National Fire Management Division.

Christianson co-leads the First Nations Wildfire Evacuation Partnership (FNWEP), a long-running research and knowledge-mobilization collaboration on wildfire evacuations affecting First Nations communities.

== Early life and education ==
Christianson grew up in Whitecourt, Alberta. She earned a BSc (Honours) (2003) and a PhD (2011) from the University of Alberta.

== Career ==
Christianson has worked in federal wildland fire research and policy, including as a research scientist with the Canadian Forest Service (Natural Resources Canada). In 2023, she was a Canadian Forest Service research scientist and was on interchange to Parks Canada as an Indigenous fire specialist in the National Fire Management Division.

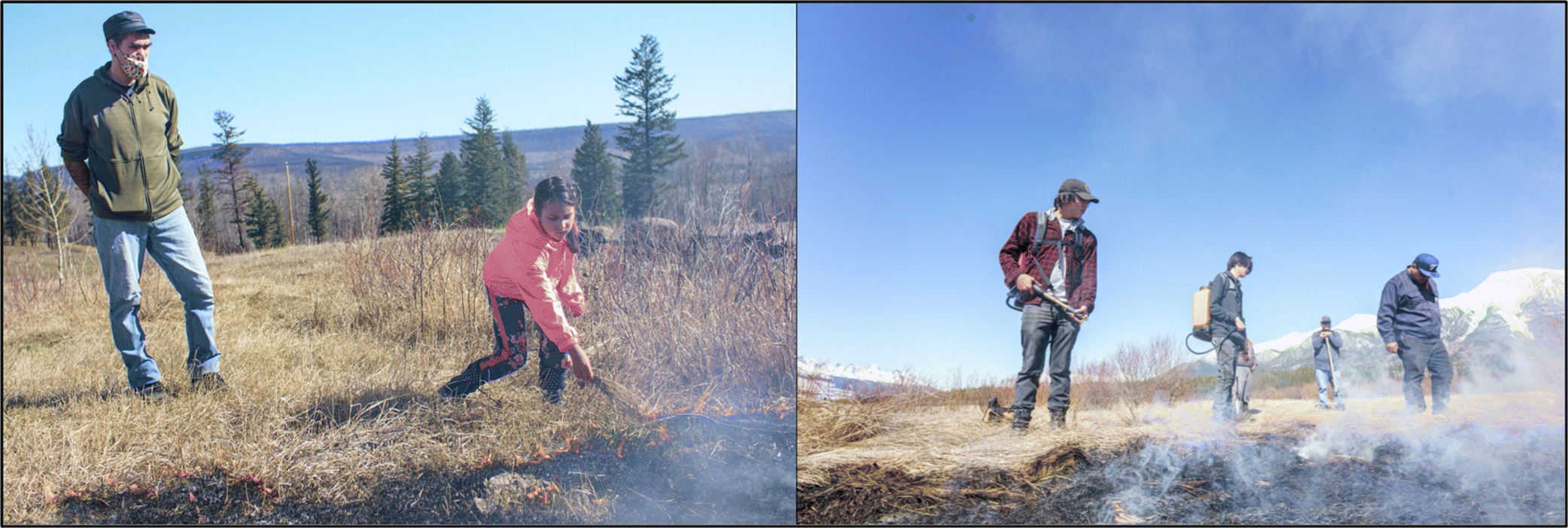
Cultural burning in indigenous communities in British Columbia, Canada, in a co-authored research by Christianson

In 2024, Christianson joined the Indigenous Leadership Initiative as a policy advisor, working on Indigenous-led approaches to wildfire, including Indigenous fire stewardship. As Senior Fire Advisor, she works with Indigenous Nations on fire stewardship practices such as cultural burning and has advocated for Indigenous wildland firefighters.

== First Nations Wildfire Evacuation Partnership ==
Christianson and Tara K. McGee co-lead FNWEP, which has produced research and practical guidance for communities and agencies on wildfire evacuation planning and experiences. In 2021, McGee and Christianson (with FNWEP) published First Nations Wildfire Evacuations: A Guide for Communities and External Agencies with UBC Press.

In 2025, McGee and Christianson received the Social Sciences and Humanities Research Council of Canada (SSHRC) Impact Award (Connection Award) for their work co-leading FNWEP.

== Research ==
Christianson’s research includes work on evacuation patterns and impacts associated with wildland fire. For example, in 2024, she co-authored a study on wildland fire evacuations in Canada from 1980 to 2021 in the International Journal of Wildland Fire.

Her work on Indigenous fire stewardship and cultural burning has also been discussed in media on wildfire impacts and policy in Canada.

== Public outreach ==
Christianson co-hosts the podcast Good Fire, which covers Indigenous uses of fire internationally and the ecological and cultural dimensions of fire stewardship.

== Awards and honours ==
- SSHRC Impact Award (Connection Award), shared with Tara McGee, 2025.
- Lynn Orstad Award: Women in Wildfire Resiliency, 2025.

== Books and reports ==
- McGee, Tara K.; Cardinal Christianson, Amy (2021). First Nations Wildfire Evacuations: A Guide for Communities and External Agencies. UBC Press. ISBN 9780774880664.
- Blazing the Trail: Celebrating Indigenous Fire Stewardship (FireSmart Canada; multi-author volume).
