= Amy Trappey =

Taiwanese industrial engineer

Amy J. C. Trappey (Chinese: 張瑞芬) is a Taiwanese industrial engineer specializing in information management, intellectual property analysis, asset management, and knowledge engineering. She is Tsing Hua Distinguished Professor in the Department of Industrial Engineering and Engineering Management at National Tsing Hua University.

== Education and career ==
Trappey studied industrial management at National Cheng Kung University, graduating in 1983, and moved to the US for graduate study. After a 1985 master's degree in quantitative business analysis at Louisiana State University, she completed a Ph.D. in 1989 at Purdue University.

After continuing at Purdue in a temporary position, Trappey became an assistant professor at Iowa State University in 1990. She returned to Taiwan in 1992 as an associate professor of industrial engineering at National Tsing Hua University (NTHU) in 1992. She was promoted to full professor in 1996, and became founding director of the Electronic Business Center in 2003. She was named Tsing Hua Distinguished Professor in 2008. While continuing to hold her affiliation with NTHU, she also became dean of the College of Management and chair professor at National Taipei University of Technology from 2008 to 2011. Since 2017 she has directed the Advanced Manufacturing and Service Management Research Center at NTHU.

She has been editor-in-chief of the Journal of the Chinese Institute of Industrial Engineers from 2003 to 2004, and of the International Journal of Electronic Business Management from 2003 to 2008 and 2012 to 2016. Since 2024 she is editor-in-chief of the journal World Patent Information.

== Recognition ==
Trappey was named as an ASME Fellow in 2004. She is also a Fellow of the International Society of Engineering Asset Management, elected in 2009, and of the Chinese Institute of Industrial Engineers, elected in 2014.

In 2009 the Chinese Institute of Industrial Engineers gave her their Industrial Engineering Medal for academic research.

== Personal life ==
Trappey married Charles V. Trappey, an American, who emigrated to Taiwan with her and became a professor (now emeritus) of management science at National Yang Ming Chiao Tung University.
