= Amy Silverstein =

American medical memoirist (1963–2023)

- Born: Amy Jill Shorin; June 3, 1963; Queens, New York, U.S.
- Died: May 5, 2023 (aged 59)
- Education: New York University
- Occupation: Writer
- Years active: 2007–2023

Amy Jill Silverstein (née Shorin; June 3, 1963 – May 5, 2023) was an American writer. The author of the memoirs Sick Girl and My Glory Was I Had Such Friends, in addition to magazine articles and essays, she had two heart transplants.

== Early life and education ==
Amy Jill Shorin was born on June 3, 1963, in Queens, New York, and grew up in Great Neck. Her parents were Arthur Shorin and Arlene Fein Shorin. She attended New York University and earned an undergraduate journalism degree in 1985, and a postgraduate degree in law. She began to develop symptoms of heart disease during her first year in law school.

== Heart transplants, memoirs ==
Silverstein was diagnosed with congestive heart failure and underwent her first heart transplant in 1988. Following the transplant she finished law school. Her memoir Sick Girl was published in 2007.

Silverstein followed a strict diet and intense exercise regimen. With near-constant infections following the transplant, she had more than 90 heart biopsies to check for signs of rejection. Her first donor heart kept her alive for more than 25 years, exceeding expectations. She had a second heart transplant after the first developed vasculopathic lesions. The donor was a 13-year-old girl.

While in the hospital recovering from the transplant, she was visited by friends from all over the United States. Her second memoir focused on the support of her friends and family.

A critic of the medical industry, in a New York Times essay in 2023, she wrote: “Organ transplantation is mired in stagnant science and antiquated, imprecise medicine that fails patients and organ donors." The essay, "My Transplanted Heart and I Will Die Soon", was published six weeks prior to her death.

== Personal life and death ==
Her father Arthur was the CEO of Topps, a collectibles company. After her parents were divorced her father married Beverly Shorin. She had one sister, Jodie Hirsch, who died in 2020.

Silverstein was married to Scott Silverstein. They had one son, Casey.

Silverstein died of cancer on May 5, 2023; she attributed the cancer to the decades-long use of post-transplant medications. She was 59.
