= Amy Reibman =

American electrical engineer

Amy R. Reibman is an American electrical engineer known for her work on video quality, transport, and analysis. She is a professor of electrical and computer engineering at Purdue University.

== Education and career ==
Reibman's parents were an engineer and a computer programmer, and she became interested in computing while still in elementary school. After starting her undergraduate education in mechanical engineering at a different university, she became an electrical engineering student at Duke University, where she earned a bachelor's degree in 1983, master's degree in 1984, and Ph.D. in 1987.

After joining the Princeton University faculty as an assistant professor, she moved to AT&T Labs Research. She worked at AT&T for 23 years, and was named a Distinguished Member of the Technical Staff and Lead Inventive Scientist there, before returning to academia as a professor at Purdue.

== Recognition ==
Reibman was named a Fellow of the IEEE in 2005, "for contributions to the transport of video over networks". Reibman was elected to fellow status of the National Academy of Inventors in December, 2022.
