= Amy Andreotti =

American biochemist

Amy Hamilton Andreotti
- Education: Princeton University; Bowdoin College
- Scientific career
- Institutions: Iowa State University
- Thesis: Part I. The effects of glycosylation on peptide backbone conformation; Part II. An NMR study of calicheamicin bound to DNA (1994)

Amy Hamilton Andreotti is an American biochemist who is the Roy J. Carver Chair and University Professor of Biochemistry, Biophysics, and Molecular Biology at Iowa State University. Her research considers TEC kinases including Bruton's tyrosine kinase (BTK) and IL-2 inducible T-cell kinase (ITK).

== Early life and education ==
Andreotti was an undergraduate student at Bowdoin College in Maine. She majored in chemistry and studio art. After earning her bachelor's degree, Andreotti moved to Princeton University as a graduate student with Dan Kahne. At Princeton, Andreotti investigated the impact of glycosylation on the conformation of peptide backbones. She primarily made use of nuclear magnetic resonance spectroscopy. Andreotti was a postdoctoral fellow at Harvard University, where she worked as a postdoc in the laboratory of Stuart Schreiber.

== Research and career ==
Andreotti investigates intracellular signaling molecules. Tightly controlled signaling networks are responsible for cell growth and proliferation. Andreotti has shown that a single mutation of an amino acid in proto-oncogene tyrosine-protein kinase Src can disrupt the mechanisms that inactivate the enzyme. As the protein remains active, excess phosphorylation occurs, which can cause cell death. In particular, Andreotti studies the signaling mechanisms in hematopoietic stem cells, including IL2-inducible tyrosine kinase and Bruton's tyrosine kinase. She has developed nuclear magnetic resonance spectroscopy to understand structure-property relationships of kinases.

In 2013, Andreotti was appointed Director of the Initiative in Biomolecular Structure. She was elected to the Iowa State University Biotechnology Council in 2018. In 2019, she was awarded a multi-million dollar grant to develop a cryo-transmission electron microscopy system at Iowa State University.

== Selected publications ==
- Amy Hamilton Andreotti; Stephen C. Bunnell; Sibo Feng; Leslie J. Berg; Stuart L. Schreiber (2 January 1997). "Regulatory intramolecular association in a tyrosine kinase of the Tec family". Nature. 385 (6611): 93–7. doi:10.1038/385093A0. ISSN 1476-4687. PMID 8985255. Wikidata Q27734282.
- Amy H Andreotti (1 August 2003). "Native state proline isomerization: an intrinsic molecular switch". Biochemistry. 42 (32): 9515–9524. doi:10.1021/BI0350710. ISSN 0006-2960. PMID 12911293. Wikidata Q35196998.
- Kristine N Brazin; Robert J Mallis; D Bruce Fulton; Amy H Andreotti (19 February 2002). "Regulation of the tyrosine kinase Itk by the peptidyl-prolyl isomerase cyclophilin A". Proceedings of the National Academy of Sciences of the United States of America. 99 (4): 1899–904. Bibcode:2002PNAS...99.1899B. doi:10.1073/PNAS.042529199. ISSN 0027-8424. PMC 122291. PMID 11830645. Wikidata Q24534698.
