= Amy Clarke (disambiguation) =

Amy Clarke (1892–1980) was a British mystical poet and writer.

Amy Clarke or Amy Clark may also refer to:

- Amy Clarke (1853–1908), or Mrs. Henry Clarke, English writer of historical fiction
- Amy Clarke (musician) (born 1976), American singer-songwriter, musician and activist
- Amy Ashmore Clark, Canadian-born American songwriter, composer, and businesswoman
- Amy J. Clarke, American metallurgist
