= Noisemaker =

Device to make loud noise, usually for fun

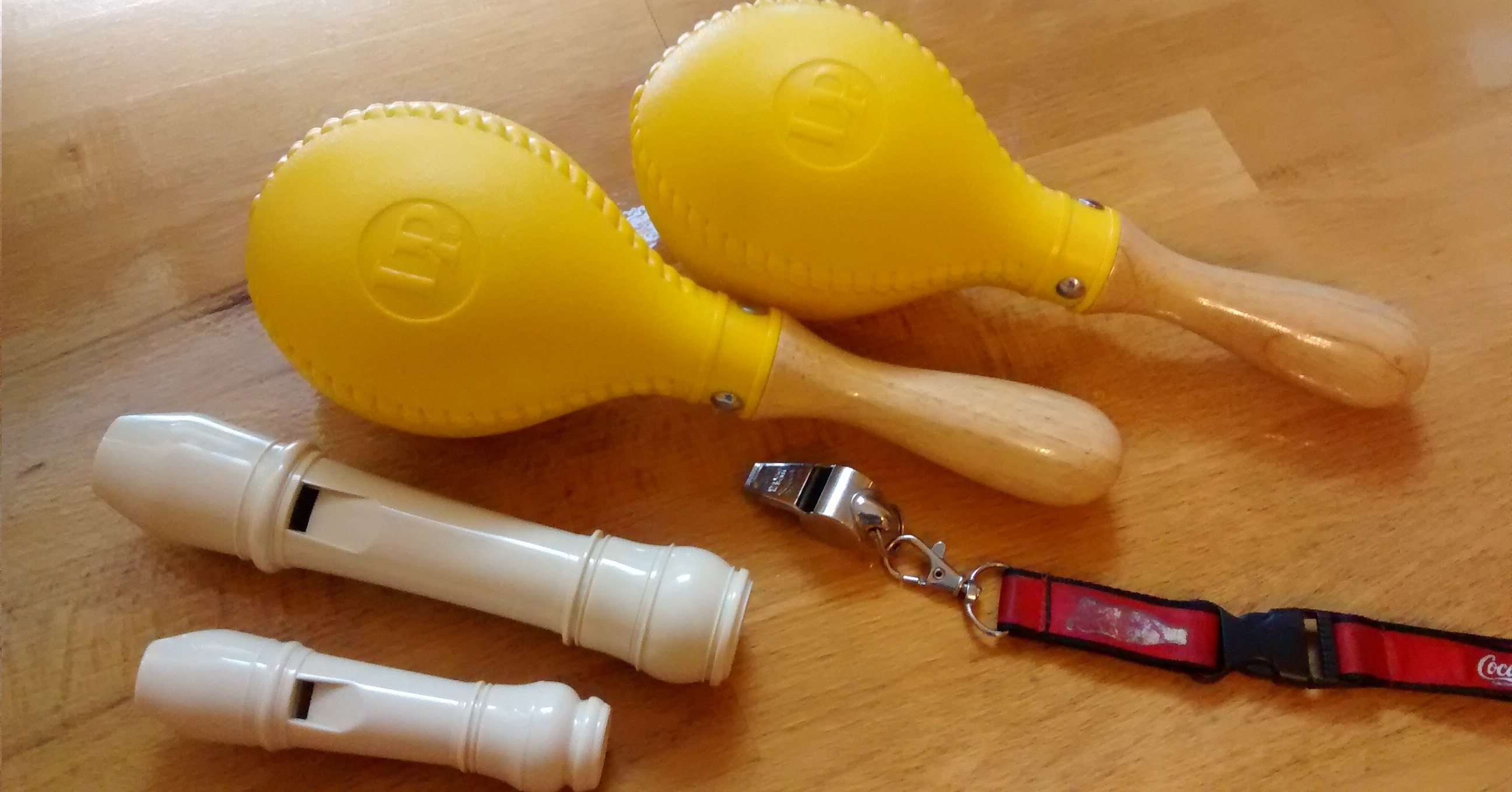
Some noisemakers: Soprano and alto recorder head joints (bottom left), pea whistle (center) and very loud LP 281 maracas (top)

A noisemaker is something intended to make a loud noise, usually for fun. They are popular with children as toy musical instruments. They can be perfectly included in loud rhythm bands and in the music education for young children.

Instruments or devices commonly considered "noisemakers" include the:

- pea whistle
- air horn
- fireworks, such as firecrackers, bottle rockets, bang snaps and others
- party horn
- ratchets, orchestral musical instruments played by percussionists. See also derkach, rapach, and grager.
- sirens
- vuvuzela
- the head joint of recorders
- couesnophone
- groan tube
- moo box
- whirly tube
- kazoo
