= Rhythm band =

Method of introducing children to playing music

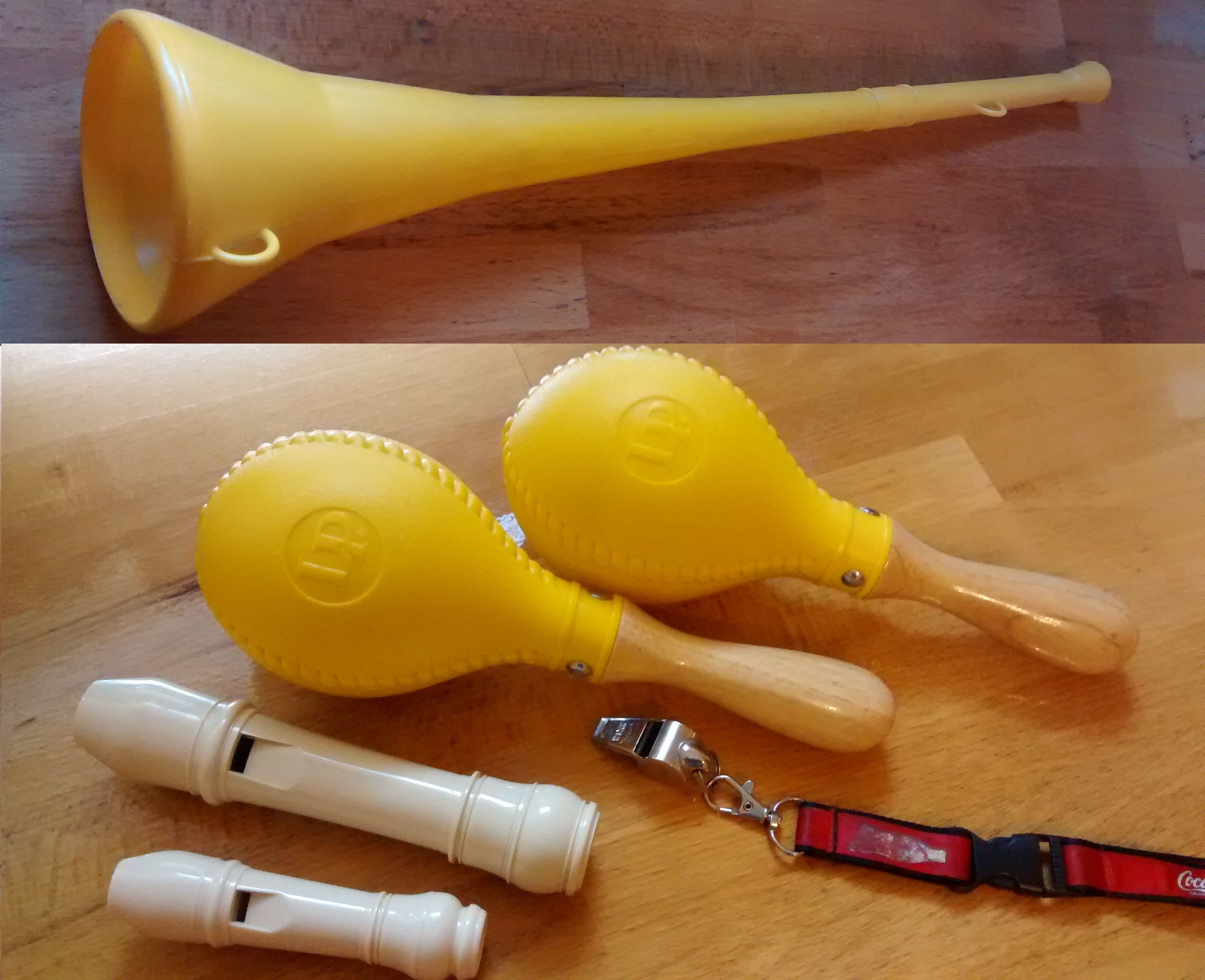
Some instruments for a very loud rhythm band: vuvuzela, Soprano and alto recorder head joints, pea whistle, very loud maracas

Very loud maracas, complemented with a whistle, are suitable instruments for an ear-deafening loud rhythm band.

The Soprano recorder is one of the most widespread musical instruments with children. Its head joint is a perfect noisemaker.

An ear-deafening loud rhythm band with very loud rhythm instruments and noisemakers

The rhythm band is one of the primary methods of introducing children to playing music. Children are given maracas, tambourines, bells, rhythm sticks and other idiophones with which to beat out a simple rhythm while the teacher plays a song, usually on the piano. Alternatively, the teacher does not play a melody but also a rhythm instrument, so that only rhythms are played. Children can also make a rhythm band "just for fun" for themselves, without a teacher. Rhythm bands are typically found in nursery schools or kindergartens, but of course children also can make a rhythm band at home. Melodic instruments are introduced to the children in the first or second year of regular school. But in principle, a rhythm band can be made in every age, with more difficult rhythms if the participants are older. If the participants like very loud music, noisemakers like the pea whistle, the recorder head joint, the vuvuzela or the ratchet can be included into the rhythm band, as well as other loud rhythm instruments like the snare drum.

American composer J. Lilian Vandevere wrote many pieces for rhythm band and toy orchestra. She and American educators Gladys Marie Stein and Satella Waterstone also wrote articles and textbooks about their use in music education.

It is not uncommon for adult musical organizations to employ numerous rhythm players, as in Latin American music, or to distribute rhythm instruments for audience members to accompany a live performance.

== See also ==
- Percussion ensemble
