= Jibber Jabber =

Jibber Jabber may refer to:

- Jibber Jabber (TV series), a Canadian children's television series
- Jibba Jabber, a type of doll made in the 1990s
- Gibberish, speech or other use of language that is nonsense, or that appears to be nonsense
