= Party horn =

Type of paper tube horn

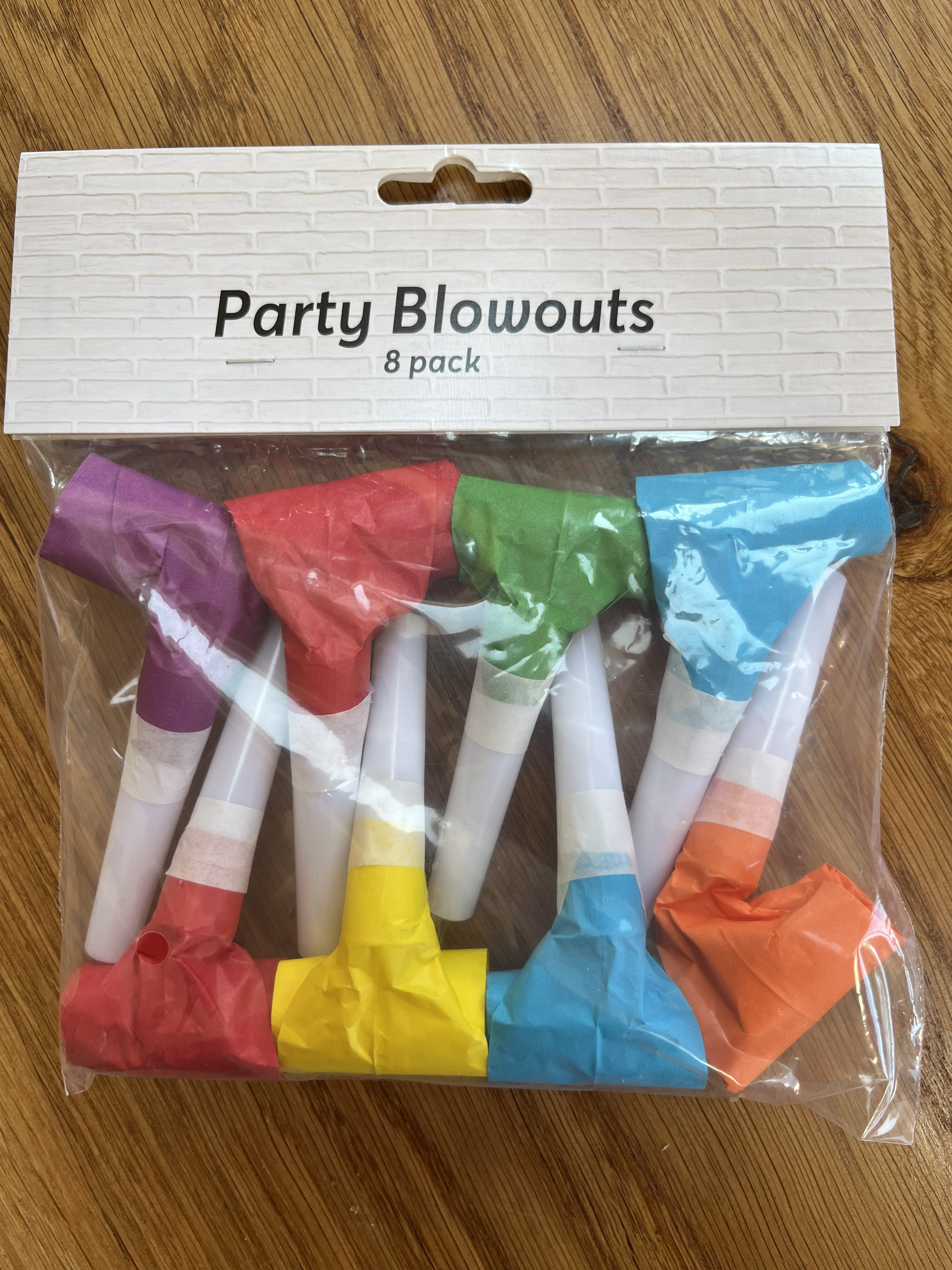
Party horn multipack

A party horn (also known as a party blower) is a paper noisemaker which unfurls and produces a horn-like noise when a person blows into it. Party horns may be distributed at birthday parties, New Year's Eve, and other celebrations to create festive noise.

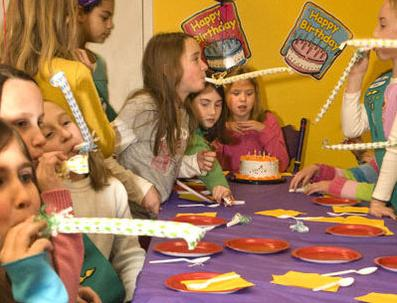
Children blow party horns at a birthday party

English does not have a single, consistent term for this but different places employ neologisms and variants with synonyms of blowing (puffing, blowout etc.) and onomatopoeic names (whistle, squeak etc.). The term for party horn in several other languages translates to "a mother in law's tongue" (e.g. Portuguese língua de sogra).

The sound of a party horn
A party horn unfurling

The party horn became a popular party favor in the early 1900s. Modern variations have a plastic mouthpiece to prevent damage to the paper from moisture of the mouth. The paper tube often contains a coiled metal or plastic strip that rapidly retracts the horn after it is blown. Others have a brightly coloured feather attached to the end which vibrates in the outgoing airflow. Party horns are often sold in multi-packs for parties and other celebratory events.

Blooper and the Phillie Phanatic, each a mascot of a Major League Baseball team, have party horns in their ears and as a tongue, respectively.

The world record for the most people blowing party horns at one time was set on November 21, 2009 with 6091 people in Tokyo, Japan. In September 2020, David Rush and Eirinn Hannon, both from Idaho, made 108 toots from party blowers in one minute, breaking a previous Guinness World Record of 78. They were required to alternate each toot.

== Medicine ==
Medical researchers have studied using party horns as a simple way to test respiratory function in patients with dementia. This was of interest because standard methods of pulmonary function testing can be difficult to understand for some patients. Researchers have also tested party horns as an at-home breathing exercise for elderly people to help maintain healthy respiration and swallowing.

Asking a child to blow a party horn can be a non-pharmacological intervention to minimize perception of pain during routine procedures such as vaccinations and blood draws for lab tests.

== See also ==
- Air horn § Portable or personal air horns
- Bourdon tube
- Kazoo
- Party popper
- Vuvuzela
