= Groan (disambiguation) =

A groan is a low, mournful sound uttered in pain or grief.

Groan may also refer to:

- Groan tube, a prank toy
- Groans of the Britons (5th century), Britons' appeal to the Romans for protection from Pictish raiders
- Titus Groan (character), in the Gormenghast trilogy of novels by Mervyn Peake
