= Gladys Marie Stein =

American author, composer, music educator, and pianist

Gladys Marie Stein (October 19, 1900 - October 9, 1989) was an American author, composer, music educator, and pianist who published articles and books about rhythm bands, as well as musical compositions. Stein was born in Meadville, Pennsylvania, to Albertha Hood and Henry Stein. She had one brother. She graduated from the Pennsylvania College of Music in 1922 and the New England Conservatory in 1924. She also studied at Thiel College, the Pittsburgh Musical Institute, the Erie Conservatory, and the University of Pittsburgh. In 1929, she founded the Stein School of Music at 1109 W. 26th Street, Erie, Pennsylvania.

Stein’s works were published by Ludwig & Ludwig (see Ludwig Drums). They included:

== Band ==
- Dancing Along
- Dancing Americans
- Happy Little Robin
- Hummer’s Waltz
- In Tulip Time
- Polish Dance
- Redbird
- Scouts on Parade
- Song of the Young Braves
- Springtime Frolic
- Waltz of the Toys

== Books ==
- Tuned Time Bell
- Rhythm Band Instruction
- Tuned Resonator Bell and Rhythm Instructor

== Piano ==
- Melodies to Play
- Red Feather
- Soldiers on Parade
