= Florence Turner-Maley =

American singer

Florence Turner-Maley (August 23, 1871 – January 3, 1962) was an American composer, singer, and teacher.

Florence Turner was born in Jersey City, New Jersey, to William Hayward and Mathilde (Holwill) Turner. Her father had been a boy soprano. She attended the Hasbrouck Institute in New York and the University of Geneva in Switzerland. She studied in Paris and with Joseph Barnaby, Gustave Becker, Jacques Bouhy, Rafael Joseffy, Alberta Lawrence, Mathilde Marchesi, and Cora D. Roucourt. She married actor Stephen Maley in 1901.

Turner-Maley debuted at Carnegie Hall in 1898. She gave voice lessons and was the soprano soloist at Church of the Pilgrims in Brooklyn and at the Brick Presbyterian Church in New York. She appeared as a guest soloist with the New York Symphony, the Cincinnati Orchestra, and with conductors Edward Morris Bowman, Alfred Hallam, Victor Harris, and Arthur Mees.

Turner-Maley belonged to the American Society of Composers, Authors and Publishers (ASCAP), the Musicians Club of New York, and the New York Singing Teachers' Association. She was vice president of the Guild of Vocal Teachers.

Her music is included on the following commercial recordings:

- Edison 5839 (1917)
- Columbia 77628 (1918)
- Columbia 77735 (1918)
- Edison 7224 (1920)
- Edison 7521 (1920)
- Columbia 80464 (1922)
- Victor BVE-33610 (1925)
- Victor BVE-37388 (1927)

Turner-Maley's music was published by Allen and Co., G. Schirmer Inc., Huntzinger and Dilworth, John Church Co., M. Witmark and Sons, and Oliver Ditson and Co.

In addition to pieces for piano, Turner-Maley composed the following vocal music:

== Choir ==
- Hail Your Risen Lord: Easter Anthem (text by W. T. Scott)
- Hark! What Mean Those Holy Voices?
- Pastoral (men's choir)

== Songs ==
- "A Call"
- "Ah Sweet Is Tipperary in the Spring"
- "Far Exchange" (text by Mattie Lee Hausgen)
- "Fields of Ballyclare" (text by Dennis A. McCarthy)
- "God Grant Us Repose"
- "I See Him Everywhere" (text by Joseph Mary Plunkett)
- "I'll Follow You" (text by Stanley Murphy)
- "In a Garden Wild" (text by Lady Caroline Blanche Elizabeth Lindsay)
- "In a Little Town Nearby" (text by Amy Ashmore Clark)
- "Jesus, Thou Joy of Loving Hearts" (text by T. R. Palmer)
- "Lass o'Mine"
- "Let the Little Ones Come Unto Me" (text by J. Luke)
- "Light at Evening Time" (text by R. H. Robinson)
- "Long and Long Ago"
- "Pastoral"
- "Song of Sunshine"

== For Children ==
- Jingly Ringly Rhymes
- Just for Children: Songs to be Sung to Them (text by Gilly Bear)
- "Pirate" (text by Margaret Gordon)
- Some Songs to Play, Some Songs to Sing (with Satella Waterstone)
- Songs for Kindergarten
- Ten Tiny Songs of Fantasy
