= J. Lilian Vandevere =

J. Lilian Vandevere (Jul 1885 – 10 May 1957) was an American author, composer, and music educator. She is best remembered today for her compositions for rhythm band and toy orchestra, and her work on the California State Series textbooks for music education.

Vandevere was born in Canton, Pennsylvania, to Clara H. and George W. Vandevere. She attended the University of Pennsylvania in 1914 and 1915. Vandevere taught kindergarten for 15 years, and became interested in using rhythm bands and toy orchestras to teach music to young children. By 1930, she had started publishing books, articles, and musical compositions.

Vandevere said that when students listen to music, they learn about "the preservation of individuality while contributing to the welfare of the group.. . . Let there be a toy orchestra in every kindergarten and primary grade, and let it include each and every child."

Vandevere's writing and musical compositions were published by Allan & Company, Art Publication Society, B. F. Wood Music Company, California State Department of Education, C. C. Birchard and Company, Carl Van Roy, F. A. Owen Publishing Company, G. Schirmer Inc., Oliver Ditson and Company, Rand McNally and Company, and Theodore Presser Company. They include:

== Articles/Short Story ==
- "The Defiance of Abigail," McClure Newspaper Syndicate Sep 1916
- "Musical Education Through the Toy Orchestra," American Childhood Oct 1928
- The Rented Christmas (short story)
- "The Scope of the Toy Symphony Orchestra," School Music 30 No. 144 Mar-Apr 1929

== Books ==
- A Pet for Peter: a Rand McNally Elf Book
- Birchard Choral Collections No. 2: Male Voices
- Christmas Eve in the Playroom
- Contest of the Nations: Directions for Dances (textbook)
- Happy Singing (textbook with Peter W. Dykema and Gladys Pitcher)
- Lavender's Blue: A Picture Score
- Let Music Ring (textbook with Peter W. Dykema and Gladys Pitcher)
- Mender Man: A Children's Play
- Music Everywhere (California State Series textbook with M. Teresa Armitage; Peter W. Dykema; Gladys Pitcher and K. D. Stevens)
- Music in the Air (California State Series textbook with Peter W. Dykema; Gladys Pitcher, Martha Powell Setchell, and D. K. Stevens)
- Our First Music (textbook with M. Teresa Armitage; Peter W. Dykema; Gladys Pitcher; and Floy Adele Rossman)
- Our Land of Song (textbook with M. Teresa Armitage; Peter W. Dykema; Gladys Pitcher and K. D. Stevens)
- Shall I Tell You, Mother? A Picture Score
- Sing Out! (textbook with Peter W Dykema; Hazel Nohavec Morgan; Gladys Pitcher; Martha Powell Setchell; Herman F Smith; and D K Stevens)
- Singing School series (textbook with Peter W. Dykema; Gladys Pitcher; Donald Franklin Main; Hazel Nohavec Morgan; Herman F. Smith; and Martha Powell Setchell)
- Toy Symphony Orchestra: Its Organization and Training

== Operettas ==
- Bells of Beaujolais (dance directions by Vandevere; music by Louis Adolphe Coerne; text by David Gurden Stevens)
- Dragon of Wu Foo (text by David Gurden Stevens)
- Far Away Friends: an Operetta with Toy Orchestra
- Flower of Venezia (with Ronald Dundas)
- In Arcady (text by David Gurden Stevens)
- Peggy and the Pirate (with Geoffrey F. Morgan)
- Princess has a Birthday: a Toy Orchestra Operetta
- Purple Pigeon (with Gladys Pitcher; libretto by Irene Alexander)
- Tale of the Toys: a Christmas Operetta for Children (with Gladys Pitcher)
- Witch of Brocken (with Louis Gruenberg and Emil Ferdinand Malkowsky)

== Piano ==
- Animal Suite
- Autumn
- Gingerbread Man
- Here Comes the Train
- In Holland
- Pedro and Pepita: A Dialogue
- Play and Sing Book (40 pieces)
- Polish Holiday: Mazurka (six hands)
- Scouts
- Spain by Starlight
- Spanish Guitars
- Tango at Twilight
- Wooden Shoes

== Rhythm Band ==
- Allegro from Sonatine Opus 36 No. 1 (percussion instruments; Muzio Clementi arr. by Vandevere)
- Andante from the Surprise Symphony (percussion instruments and piano; Joseph Haydn arr. by Vandevere)
- Ballet Music and other excerpts (percussion instruments and piano; Franz Schubert arr. by Vandevere)
- Blossom, Rosebush
- Children's Piece (Felix Mendelssohn; arr. by Vandevere)
- Come Join the Dance! (Alphons Czibulka; arr. by Vandevere and Bertha Remick)
- For Lincoln's Birthday
- Handbells for Manhattan (handbells)
- (Hansel and Gretel Excerpts) (Engelbert Humperdinck; arr. by Vandevere)
- In Holland Stands a House: a Dutch Folk Tune
- Jump Jim Crow (Sigmund Romberg; arr. by Vandevere)
- La Czarine (Louis Ganne; arr. by Vandevere)
- Little Carnival: Polka Mazurka, opus 105 (Louis Streabbog pseud. Jean Louis Gobbaerts arr. by Vandevere)
- March (Alexis Hollaender arr. by Vandevere)
- March from the Nutcracker Suite (Peter Tchaikovsky; arr. by Vandevere)
- March Militaire (Franz Schubert; arr. by Vandevere)
- March of Fingall's Men, opus 39 no. 1 (Hugo Reinhold; arr. by Vandevere)
- New Rhythm Band Book
- On the Beat
- Polly Put the Kettle On: A Score for Rhythm Band with Pictures
- Pussy Cat, Pussy Cat: A Picture Score (with W. Keith Elliott)
- Soldier's March (percussion instruments and piano; Robert Schumann arr. by Vandevere)
- Sound Sketches: with Rhythm Instruments
- Swinging in the Lane
- There was a Crooked Man: A Picture Score (with W. Keith Elliott)
- Vandevere Holiday Series (at least 14 separate pieces for various holidays)
- Waltz from Poet and Peasant and other excerpts (Franz von Suppé; arr. by Vandevere)

== Toy Orchestra ==
- Album Leaf and other excerpts (Edvard Grieg; arr. by Vandevere)
- American Patriotic Medley
- Andante from Surprise Symphony (Joseph Haydn; arr. by Vandevere)
- From the Days of Washington
- General Bum-Bum (Ede Poldini; arr. by Vandevere)
- Holiday Hook Up (Christmas)
- Our Country
- St. Patrick's Day in the Morning (toy orchestra score with text)
- Toy Orchestra Travels in a Dozen Lands: Folk Tunes
- Toy Symphony Orchestra
- Whistler

== Vocal ==
- Ambitious Sailor
- Campfire (SAB)
- Come Spring (SA; with Gladys Pitcher)
- Gloria in Excelsis: A Christmas Carol (quartet with soprano solo; with Joseph Wagner)
- Hour of Dreaming (men's chorus; with Haydn M. Morgan; text by Reynaldo Hahn)
- In Empire Days (chorus; Henry Hadley arr. by Vandevere)
- Long Ago and Faraway
- Men of Harlech: Welsh Air (a capella TTBB; text by Theodor Koerner)
- Moonlight Serenade (SAB; text by Vandevere; melody by Riccardo Drigo; arr. by Harvey Worthington Loomis)
- My Spanish Guitar: College Song
- Nocturne: Andantino (SAB; Edwin H. Lemare arr. by Gladys Pitcher and Vandevere)
- Oh Cherish Love! (chorus; Franz Liszt arr. by Vandevere)
- Pickaninny Patter
- Pilgrims: Cantata (soprano, alto, optional bass; with John V. Dethier)
- Reverence and Praise: Moonlight Sonata (chorus; Ludwig van Beethoven arr. by Haydn M. Morgan and Vandevere)
- Throughout All the Year (chorus)
- Wind of the West Cantata (SSA; text by Vandevere; music by Roy Spaulding Stoughton)
- Youth at the Brook (SSA; Franz Schubert arr. by Gladys Pitcher and Vandevere)
