= Makarapa =

Expressive headgear worn by South African sports fans

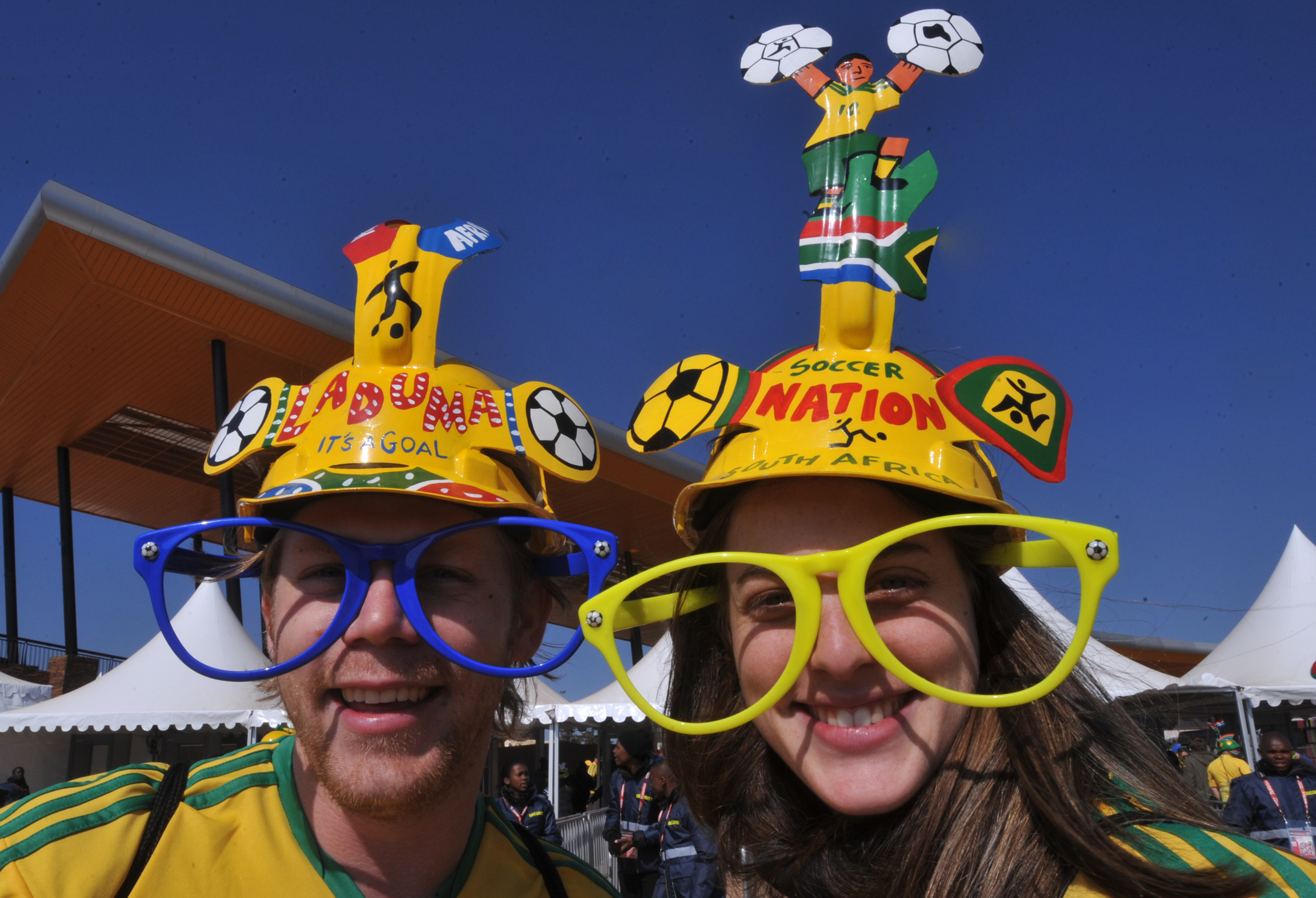
South Africa fans wearing makarapa and giant glasses

A makarapa is a hand-cut and hand-painted hard hat worn by sports fans. They belong to the typical South African football fan's supporters gear, and are increasingly popular with fans of other sports. Sport fans spend hours on sculpting and painting their makarapa in the colours and emblem of their clubs or country. Besides the makarapa, fans also wear giant glasses or have shields with team slogans and logos. With the 2010 FIFA World Cup, the international profile and availability of the makarapa has increased greatly.

== History ==
The origin of the term "makarapa" goes back to the start of mining in South Africa. The word makarapa literally meant "scrapers", referring to men who would leave the rural areas to go to the cities and "scrape" a living in mining and construction work. Upon returning they would be carrying or wearing the hard hats normally used by miners (the majority being migrant workers by Apartheid laws) and construction workers; eventually the term came to refer to the protective hats themselves.

Makarapa were present in Zürich at the selection of South Africa to host the 2010 FIFA World Cup. In September 2009 Sepp Blatter received a makarapa as a gift during a FIFA inspection.

Makarapa is registered to Grant Nicholls and Trade Marked 2006/20971, expiring 4 September 2026.

== Design ==
Makarapa are decorated to serve purposes such as being used as fan articles, an individual artwork as well as a means of promoting one's team brand in the stadiums as they attract a lot of media attention. They still also afford the wearer protection from missiles thrown at sporting matches, their original reason for being worn.

== See also ==
- Vuvuzela
- Handy horn
