= Peter W. Dykema =

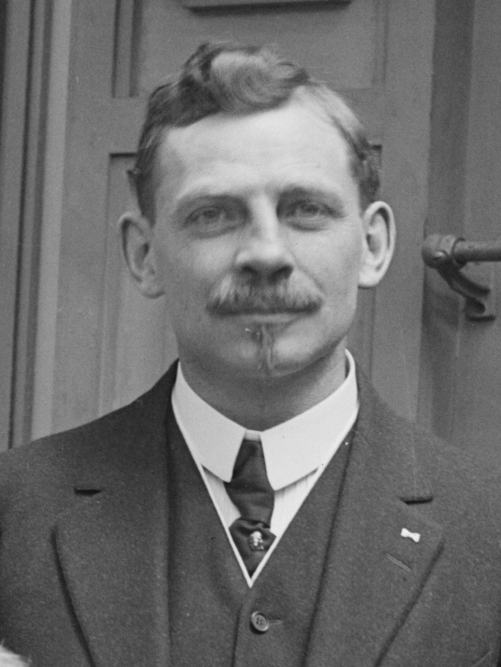
- Dykema in 1917 at the community chorus luncheon in Manhattan
- Born: November 25, 1873; Grand Rapids, Michigan, U.S.
- Died: May 13, 1951 (aged 77); Hastings-on-Hudson, New York, U.S.
- Education: B.L. (1895) University of Michigan; M.L. (1896) University of Michigan (1904-1905) Institute of Musical Art
- Occupation: Music education
- Spouse: Jessie Dunning

Peter William Dykema (November 25, 1873 – May 13, 1951) was an American educator known for his work and advocacy of music education. He was involved with the National Association for Music Education (initially known as the Music Supervisors National Conference), Phi Mu Alpha Sinfonia fraternity, the Music Teachers National Association and the National Education Association Department of Music Education. He also served as 1924-25 chairman of the Kiwanis International Committee on Music. Through these various avenues of involvement, in addition to his work as a composer, author, and educator, he was one of the leading music advocates of his day.

== Education ==
He earned a B. L Degree from the University of Michigan, Ann Arbor, Michigan, in 1895, with certification to teach French and German. He earned an M. L. Degree in English literature from the University of Michigan, Ann Arbor, Michigan, in 1896. He undertook vocal studies with Franz Arens in New York from 1903 to 1904. He studied music theory with Frank Shepard at the Institute of Musical Art, New York, from 1904 to 1905. He student music theory with Edgar Stillman Kelly in Berlin, Germany from 1911 to 1912. He also studied ear training and composition at Juilliard from 1912 to 1913.

== Career ==
Aurora High School (1896-1898) Dykema served as an English and German teacher at Aurora (Illinois) High School from 1896 to 1898.

Calvin Fletcher School (1898-1901) He served as the principal of the Calvin Fletcher School (P.S. 8) in Indianapolis, Indiana from 1898 to 1901. Located at 520 Virginia Avenue, the school was comparable to what would now be called a middle school, made up of students in grades six through eight (Indianapolis News, June 17, 1899). Dykema led the school's students in regular choral concerts presented in the community (Indianapolis News, January 24, 1900). Concerts included selections by major classical composers, a May 2, 1901, concert was made up completely of selections by Richard Wagner (Indianapolis News, May 3, 1901). Open rehearsals for students from other schools were sometimes held (Indianapolis News, April 24, 1901). Dykema sometimes presented public lectures in the community on topics such as education and visual art (Indianapolis News, November 5, 1898).

Ethical Culture School (1901-1913) He was in charge of music at what is now known as the Ethical Culture Fieldston School in New York City from 1901 to 1913. The school was founded in 1878 by religious leader and social reformer Felix Adler.

University of Wisconsin (1913-1924) He was professor of music at the University of Wisconsin in Madison from 1913 to 1924. He took a leave of absence from 1918 to 1919 to serve as Supervisor of music for Commission on Training Camp Activities of the War Department. From 1916 to 1917, he served as national president of what is now the National Association for Music Education. In 1917, he was elected to honorary membership in the Alpha chapter of Phi Mu Alpha Sinfonia Fraternity at Boston's New England Conservatory. In 1919, he was elected to honorary membership in the Beta chapter at Combs College of Music. In 1921, he was a member of the charter class of the Phi chapter installed at the University of Wisconsin. The following year, in 1922, he was elected Supreme President of the Fraternity.

Teacher's College, Columbia University (1924-1940) He served as professor and chair of the music education department, Teachers College, Columbia University, in New York from 1924 until his retirement in 1940, where he was a contemporary of educational reformer John Dewey. He used Dewey’s 1934 work Art As Experience as a text in his course on aesthetics.

Retirement (1940-1951) He was Professor Emeritus from 1940 until his death in 1951. In 1946, he was guest conductor of the summer music camp at the University of the Pacific.

== Compositions ==
Dykema wrote several songs, some of which appear in Sinfonia Songs. He wrote a choral anthem, We Who Love Music, and two Christmas songs, which appeared in the Blue Book of the Twice 55 series. They are To Shorten Winter's Sadness and A Carol for Everyman.

Dykema also collaborated on a series of music education textbooks, including several California State Series textbooks. His collaborators included M. Teresa Armitage; Donald Franklin Main; Hazel Nohavec Morgan; Gladys Pitcher; Floy Adele Rossman; Martha Powell Setchell; Herman F Smith; D K Stevens; and J. Lilian Vandevere.

== Family ==
Dykema was the ninth and youngest child of Cornelius and Henrietta Dykema, Dutch immigrants who met as teenagers and settled in Grand Rapids, Michigan after their marriage (Underwood, p. K.1). Dykema married Jessie Dunning on December 24, 1903. They had five children: Karl Washburn Dykema, Roger Dunning Dykema, Alice Mary Barnes, Helen Cargan Dengler, Peter Scot Dykema. His daughter Helen authored the biographical work Music For All in 1994, and was interviewed by Phi Mu Alpha Sinfonia Fraternity's T. Jervis Underwood for the fraternity's Centennial History.

== Advocacy ==
In 1918, he chaired a joint committee of twelve (that included John Alden Carpenter, Frederick S. Converse, Wallace Goodrich, Hollis Dann, among others) that prepared the "service version" of the National Anthem. Later, as a member of the National Anthem Committee in 1942, he helped prepare The Code for the National Anthem of the United States of America (www.thenationalanthemproject.org/reprise.pdf).

From 1923 to 1939, he served as chair of the Music Teachers National Association (MTNA)'s national Committee on Community Music. The reports of the committee as documented in MTNA's Volume of Proceedings from each year during that period contain in depth information on Dykema's efforts in the area of music advocacy: the promotion of Christmas carolling, community sings, music in industry, etc. He also described a collaboration between Phi Mu Alpha and Sigma Alpha Iota at the University of Wisconsin to establish a high school organization called Omicron Phi (MTNA Volume of Proceedings, 1936, p. 356). During much of this period, Phi Mu Alpha Sinfonia and MTNA held national conventions simultaneously.

He was a member of a Manhattan chapter of the Society for the Preservation and Encouragement of Barber Shop Quartet Singing in America (SPEBSQSA), now known as the Barbershop Harmony Society, along with fellow Sinfonians Sigmund Spaeth and Fiorello LaGuardia. Prescott Bush was also a member of the Manhattan chapter of SPEBSQUA (May 1946 Harmonizer).

== Phi Mu Alpha Sinfonia Fraternity ==
Considered one of the most influential leaders in the Fraternity's history, Dykema was elected as an honorary member of the Fraternity's Alpha chapter at the New England Conservatory in Boston on or around January 8, 1917, while serving as president of what is now the Music Educators National Conference. Three years later, he was elected an honorary member of the Beta chapter at the Combs College of Music in Philadelphia. He was a member of the class that chartered the Phi chapter at the University of Wisconsin in 1921, and was elected as a national honorary member (Alpha Alpha chapter) in 1932. Based on the records compiled by former supreme historian Thomas Larrimore, it appears that Dykema holds the record for the most multiple chapter memberships.

Following a period of internal difficulty following the active departure of Ossian E. Mills, Percy Jewett Burrell, and other early Fraternity leaders, the Fraternity experienced internal difficulty (made more significant by the challenges of World War I) during the five years leading up to Dykema's election in 1922. Upon his election, Dykema addressed the delegates at the Chicago convention, "I want to hear from each one of you. The first thing I want to know is, 'Why should this fraternity exist at all? Why shouldn't we abandon the whole idea?" (Underwood, p. K.2). Dykema's words challenged and stirred his listeners, and the Fraternity's second defining period commenced. The number of active chapters grew significantly under his watch as president, and during those years the Fraternity was introduced to major universities such as Pennsylvania State University, the University of Southern California, the University of Texas, the Eastman School of Music, the University of Illinois, the University of North Carolina at Chapel Hill, the University of Arizona, and Columbia University.

Dykema made several contributions to the Fraternity. He served on a team that oversaw the develop of membership intake protocol in 1926 and 1938. He served as editor and compiler of the 1931 edition of Sinfonia Songs. In the 1920s, he established the province structure, appointing the inaugural class of province governors. He was instrumental in bringing multiple key leaders in music education and advocacy into the fraternity, including Paul J. Weaver, Edward Bailey Birge, and Clarence C. Birchard. He presided over the dedication of the memorial in honor of Ossian E. Mills in Putnam, Connecticut in 1928, in addition to presiding over the dedication of the Sinfonia Lodge at Interlocken.

As a faculty member at Teachers College of Columbia University, he maintained close involvement with the Beta Gamma chapter, where he served on the faculty after leaving Wisconsin. Through his influence, many men associated with music education on the national level came into Fraternity membership.

He served as supreme president from 1922 to 1928, during which time the Fraternity essentially doubled its number of active chapters across the country. Dykema's ascendancy to the presidency came just five years after his first election to honorary membership in the Fraternity. After leaving office as supreme president, he served as Committeeman-at-Large from 1928 to 1934, and as Supreme Historian from 1934 to 1938. His total years of formal service to the national level was sixteen years. During the remaining thirteen years of his life, he continued to be actively involved with the Fraternity. In 1944, he helped coordinate a Fraternity reception in New York City in honor of the Republican presidential candidate, and fellow Michigan graduate and Fraternity member, Thomas E. Dewey.

He is credited with essentially saving the Fraternity from extinction through the administrative restructuring that took place under his leadership as president(which involved dividing the Fraternity into provinces and the appointment of province governors, one of the earliest of whom was Thomas E. Dewey. Through his involvement with the Music Teachers National Association and the National Association of Schools of Music, the Fraternity came into close collaboration with these organizations, which had a lasting influence on the Fraternity's focus on music advocacy for decades.

Dykema served as chair of the 1931 edition of Sinfonia Songs. Some of the popular songs of a "general nature" entered the songbook under his watch. Several of his songs are included in the current songbook published in 1998, as are several that had previously appeared in the Twice 55 Community Songs series edited by Dykema. Two of his sons were also Sinfonians: Karl Washburn Dykema (into the Delta Eta chapter at Youngstown State University in 1959), and Roger Dunning Dykema (into the Beta Gamma chapter at Columbia University in 1928). Along with William B. McBride, Dykema is one of only two men who served as national president of both the Fraternity and the NAfME.

The Fraternity commissioned an oil painting of Dykema. The painting is part of the Gottesman Libraries' collection at Columbia University. It was restored by Chelsea Restoration conservators during the summer of 2010.

== Death ==
Dykema died from a heart attack at his home in Hastings, New York on Sunday, May 13, 1951. His funeral was held in St. Paul's Chapel (Columbia University) on the campus of Columbia University in New York City. The eulogy, written by former Sinfonia national president Norval Church, was delivered by Columbia's chaplain, James A. Pike. Dykema's ashes were scattered at a lake near Ompah, Ontario, his favorite wilderness retreat.

== Honors ==
He was initiated as a member of Phi Mu Alpha's Alpha Alpha National Honorary Chapter in 1932, with the Beta Gamma chapter conducting the ceremony. In 1986, he was recognized as a member of the National Association for Music Education's Music Educators Hall of Fame.
