= Louis Coerne =

American composer and music educator (1870–1922)

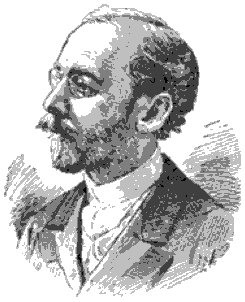
- Born: Louis Adolphe Coerne; February 27, 1870; Newark, New Jersey
- Died: September 11, 1922 (aged 52); Boston, Massachusetts
- Education: Harvard University; Stuttgart Conservatory
- Occupations: Composer, educator
- Spouse: Adele Turton (m. 1897)

Louis Adolphe Coerne (February 27, 1870 – September 11, 1922) was an American composer and music educator.

== Life and works ==
He was born in Newark, New Jersey, and was educated at Harvard University, where he studied under John Knowles Paine, and at the Stuttgart Conservatory, Germany.

He married Adele Turton in 1897.

Coerne wrote a number of pedagogical pieces for piano, and also composed a number of orchestral works, one of which, the tone poem Excalibur, Op. 180, was recorded by Karl Krueger with the Royal Philharmonic Orchestra in the late 1960s, and reissued on CD in 2006 by Bridge Records. His cantata, Hiawatha, Op. 18 was premiered in Munich in 1893 and performed by the Boston Symphony Orchestra in 1894.

Coerne's opera Zenobia, Op. 66, premiered in Bremen, Germany, in 1905, was the first opera by an American composer to be performed in Germany. Earlier that year, Harvard had conferred on Coerne the degree of Ph.D., with the score of Zenobia and his book, The Evolution of Modern Orchestration (published in 1908), serving as his thesis.

Other operas composed by Coerne:

- Bells of Beaujolais (dance directions by J. Lilian Vandevere; text by David Gurden Stevens)
- A Woman of Marblehead, Op. 40
- Sakuntala, Op. 67
- The Maiden Queen, Op. 69

Coerne taught at Smith College, Harvard, and Connecticut College. He died in Boston, Massachusetts.
