= Satella Waterstone =

American author, composer and teacher

Satella Sharps Waterstone
- Born: February 1875; Greenwood Lake, Orange, New York, U.S.
- Died: June 15, 1938 (aged 63)
- Other name: Miss Birda
- Occupations: Author; composer; teacher
- Known for: Early music education; rhythm bands; kindersymphonies
- Parent(s): Edward T. Waterstone; Satella Sharps Waterstone

Satella Sharps Waterstone (February 1875 – June 15, 1938) nicknamed "Miss Birda", was an American author, composer, and teacher.

== Biography ==
Waterstone was born in Greenwood Lake, Orange, New York to Edward T. Waterstone and Satella Sharps Waterstone, who died giving birth to her daughter. Waterstone's grandfather, Christian Sharps, was a well-known gunsmith who invented the sharps rifle, a 50-caliber gun used in the western United States to hunt buffalo.

Waterstone was educated by private tutors before studying at Columbia University and in Jena, Germany. After traveling throughout Europe, she returned home and began teaching at Spinning Private School in South Orange, New Jersey. In 1916, Waterstone and Emma Hedden opened the Hedden-Waterstone Private School for Boys and Girls, for kindergarten through third grade students.

She wrote articles about early music education, training rhythm bands, and kindersymhonies or toy symphonies. Waterstone's works were published by Derrydale Press, G. Schirmer Inc., and P.F. Volland Company.

== Selected publications ==
- A Collection of Verse (privately published by Waterstone's friend Grace Parker after Waterstone's death in 1938)
- Chapel Island (New York): A History
- Short Stories of Musical Melodies (illustrated by Katherine Sturgia)
- Some Songs to Play, Some Songs to Sing (with Florence Turner-Maley)
