= Gladys Pitcher =

Gladys Pitcher (1890 – March 24, 1996) was an American music editor, teacher, and composer.

== Biography ==
Pitcher was born in Belfast, Maine in 1890. She attended high school in Belfast and was considered for the Boston Globe scholarship contest in 1906 and received many votes towards it, including from people who were not from Belfast. She graduated from the New England Conservatory in 1910 and completed postgraduate work in theory, composition, and cello.

In 1914 she married Beloit College's director of music James T. Sleeper. She taught at Beloit College, including directing the music department while her husband served during World War I. After the war she returned to New England and taught music at schools in Bennington, Vermont and Manchester, New Hampshire.

From 1926 until her retirement in 1957, she was editor-in-chief for the Boston music publisher C.C. Birchard Company. After retirement, she returned to Belfast, Maine, where she continued to compose and edit music for the Willis Music Company.

Her hymns and choral music have been used by schools throughout the United States. Pitcher collaborated on vocal compositions with J. Lilian Vandevere, as well as on music education textbooks with Vandevere and M. Teresa Armitage; Peter W. Dykema, Donald Franklin Main; Hazel Nohavec Morgan; Floy Adele Rossman; Martha Powell Setchell; Herman F Smith; and D K Stevens.

== Honors ==
- She was awarded the second W.A. Diggins Award in 1958.
- Honorary life membership to the Maine Music Educators Association in 1971
- The Lowel Mason Award in 1976 from the Massachusetts Music Educators Association

== Selected compositions ==
- Reflections on an Early American Hymn 'Distress', for baritone and organ
- The Narcissus, adaptation of the Chinese folk tune Mo Li Hua
