= Amy Ashmore Clark =

American songwriter, composer and businesswoman (1882–1954)

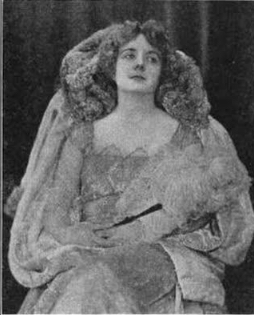
- Clark in a 1922 publication
- Born: Amy Ashmore; May 6, 1882; Toronto, Ontario, Canada
- Died: January 9, 1954 (aged 71); New York, New York
- Occupations: Musician, songwriter, composer

Amy Ashmore Clark (May 6, 1882 – January 9, 1954) was a Canadian-born American songwriter, composer, and businesswoman, "equally popular and successful as a writer of lyrics for other people's music, and a writer music for other people's lyrics", despite being unable to read or write music. She also appeared in musical comedy and vaudeville, worked in music publishing, and at several magazines.

== Early life ==
Amy Ashmore was born in Toronto, Ontario.

== Career ==
Clark wrote songs in various genres: hymns, ballads, novelties, "every kind of song except ragtime", noted one publication. She did not read or write music, but she did play piano. She was a member of ASCAP. Titles of her songs (either as lyricist or composer) included "The Flowers are Calling, Sweetheart", "My Rosary for You", "Where You Are is Paradise", "Long Lost Mama, Daddy Misses You", "Toys are Not Only for Children", "And So Your Soul was Born", "With Love He Cleanses Every Sin", "Laddie Dear", "Rockabye Rose", "The Heart of You", "Lambie Love" "I'm Telling the World That I Love You", "You and I", "To You", "Just a Cloud", and "I am One with Thee". One of her songs (co-written with Florence Turner-Maley), "In a Little Town Nearby", was used in theatres during showings of the silent film The Bond Boy.

Clark appeared in musical comedy and on vaudeville as a performer, and worked for music publishing companies. In 1918 she was described as the head of the concert department at Artmusic, Inc. She was also an advertising director, on the editorial board of the Junior League Magazine and business manager of another magazine, The Younger Set.

In 1931 she testified in court, in a scandal case involving theatrical manager A. L. Erlanger and his common-law wife, Charlotte Fixel.

== Personal life ==
Amy Ashmore married a vaudeville performer, Alexander Clark. They had a son, Alexander Clark Jr. (1901-1995), who became an actor and, later, theatre editor at Vanity Fair magazine. Her husband died in 1932, and she died in 1954, aged 71 years, in New York City.
