= Moo box =

Toy that produces the sound of a mooing cow

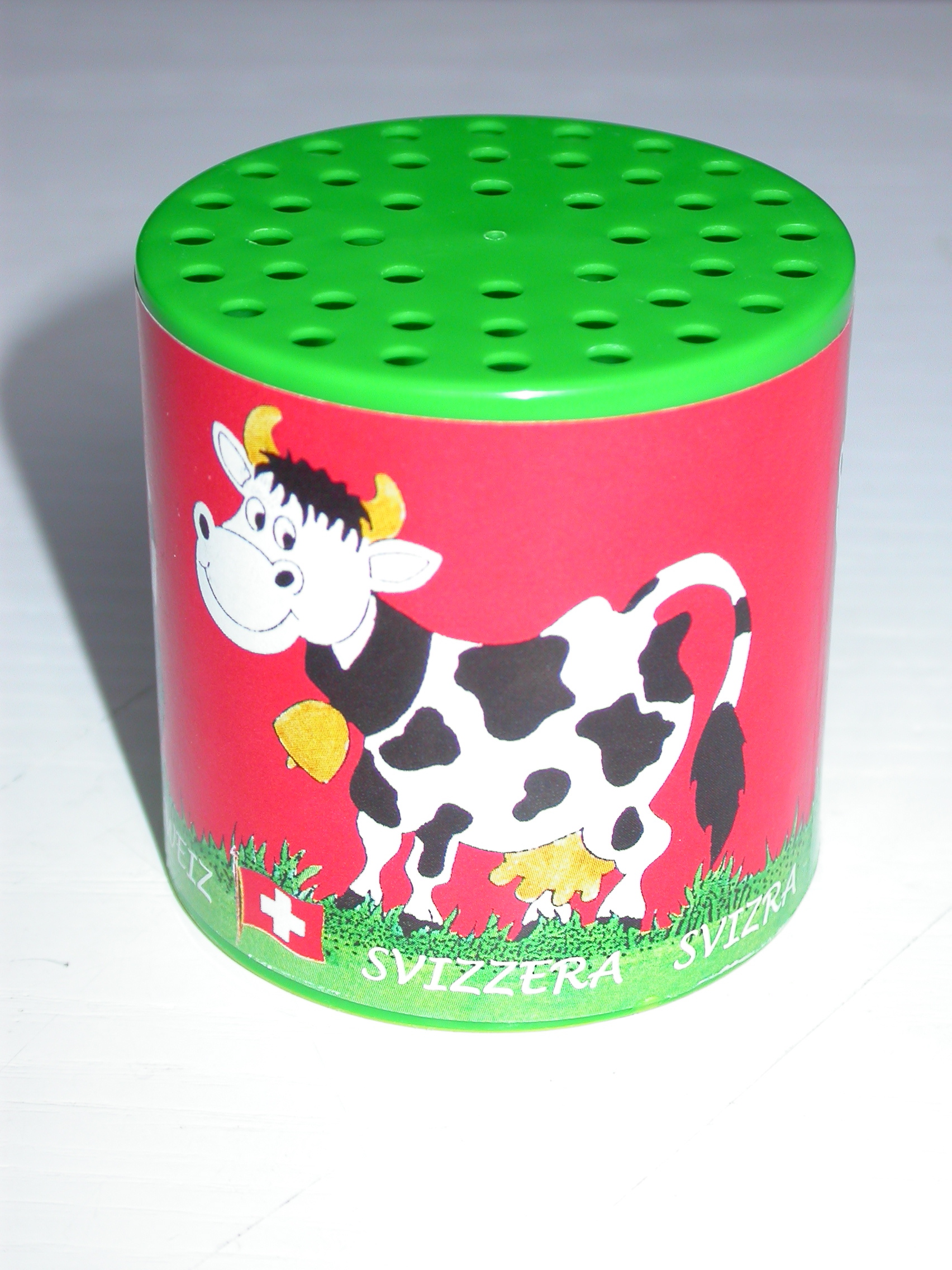
A moo box

Video of a Moo box

sound of a moo box

The moo box or moo can is a toy or a souvenir, also used as a hearing test. When turned upside down, it produces a noise that resembles the mooing of a cow. The toy can be configured to create other animal sounds such as the meow of a cat, the chirp of a bird, or the bleat of a sheep.

== Construction ==
The moo box consists of a block and a bellows. The bellows is sealed to the bottom of the box and to the block. The block is heavy and perforated, and used to actuate the bellows, producing the sound.

When the box is inverted, the block falls away from the bottom, filling the bellows with air. When the box is turned right side up, the air is expelled through a vibrating blade (which makes it a free reed instrument), producing the sound. After passing the blade, the air passes through a duct of variable length, which determines the pitch of the sound.

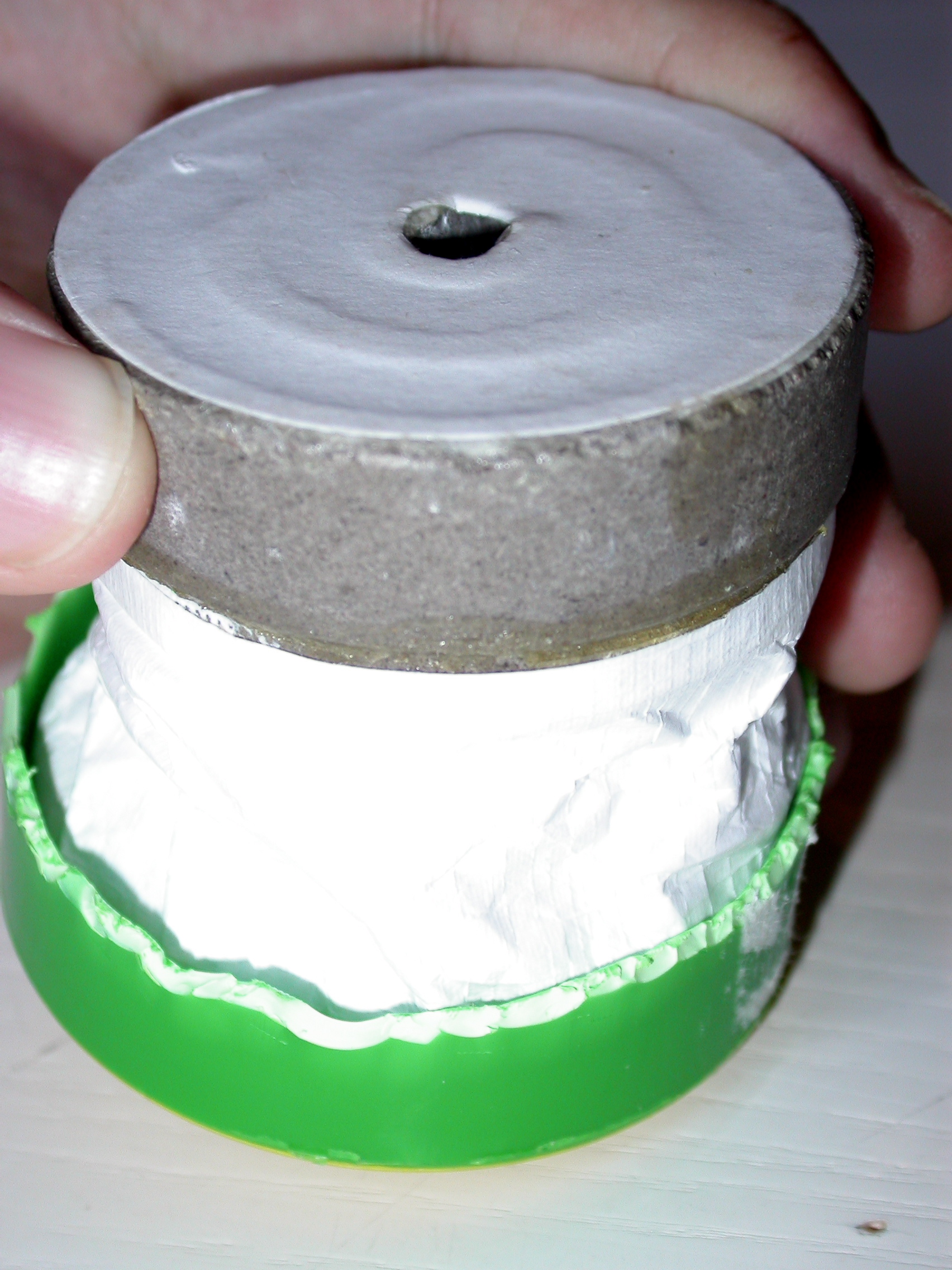
Block and bellows

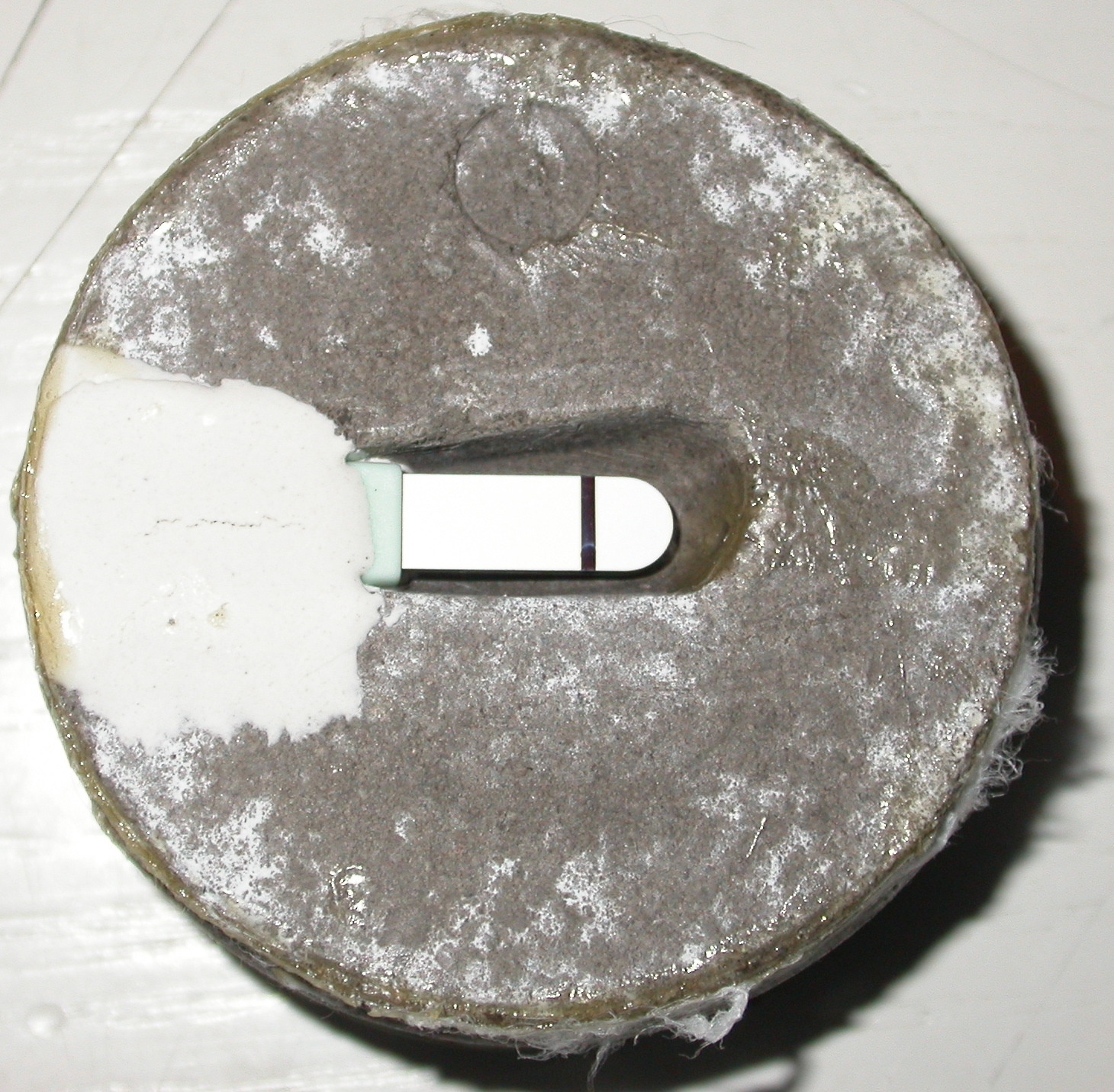
Block showing blade

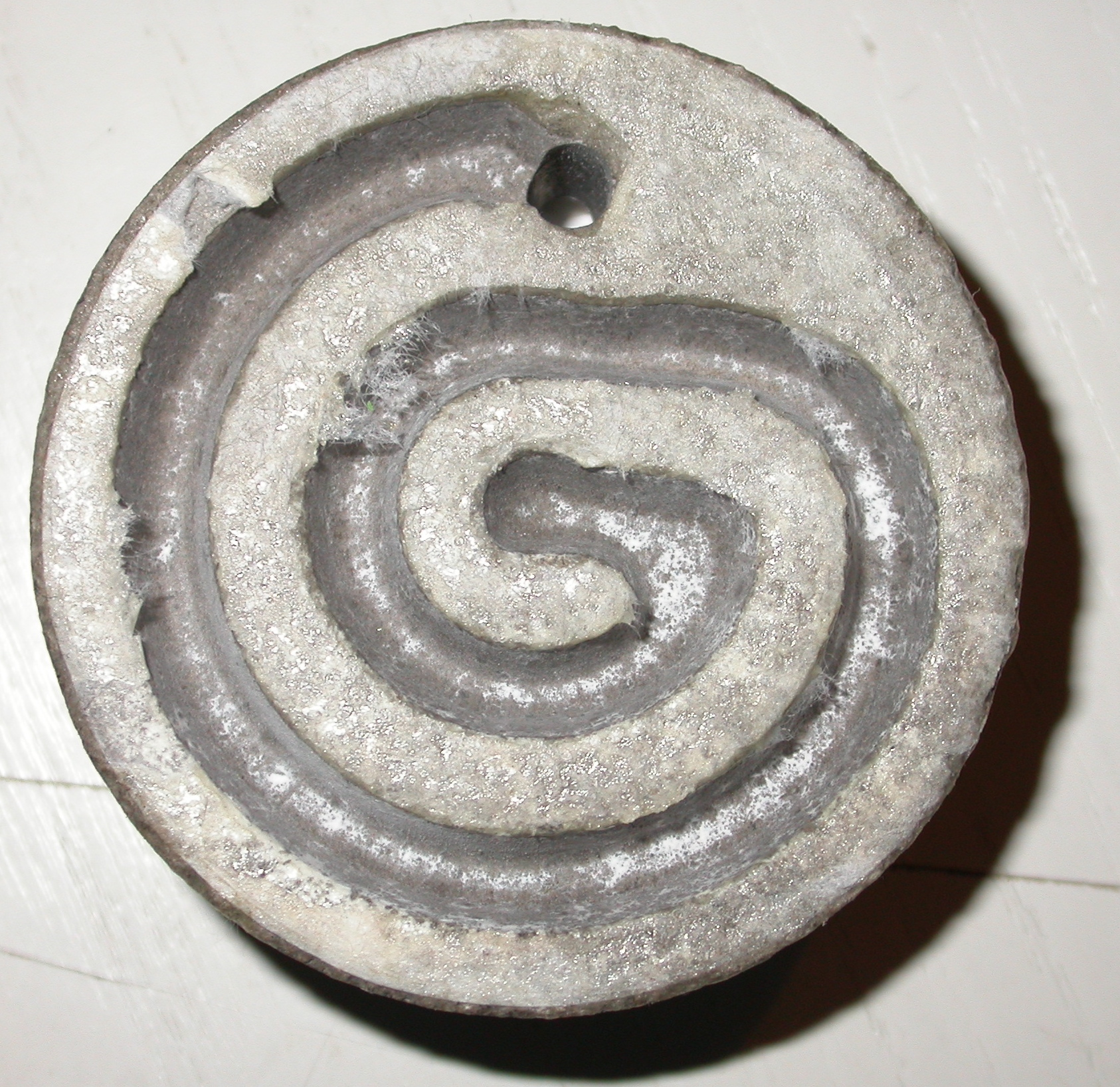
Block with duct

== Moatti test ==
The toy can be used to perform the Moatti test to test infants' hearing at different frequencies, conceived by doctor Lucien Moatti. It uses four boxes at different frequencies, all calibrated to generate a sound pressure level (loudness) of sixty decibels at two metres. The test can be used to screen the hearing of children aged from six to 24 months.

The tester knocks down the boxes out of sight of the child. If the child hears the sound, they will turn their head towards it.

== Notable appearances in pop culture ==
- A moo box was used in the Beastie Boys' track "B-boys Makin' With The Freak Freak", from their 1994 album Ill Communication.
- Michael Scott confuses a radon detector for a moo box in the cold open of The Office episode, "The Chump".
- In the French film Les Couloirs du temps : Les Visiteurs II (1998), a man from the Modern Day is accidentally transported to the Middle Ages and brought with him souvenirs from the future. While being interrogated by villagers, one of them grabs a moo box and believe the toy to be a work of witchcraft to which they have him tied to a stake to be burned.
- The Kube brothers make moo boxes in the post-apocalyptic French film Delicatessen (1991), directed by Jean-Pierre Jeunet and Marc Caro. The moo reminds them of cattle (which no longer exist in this world), and in turn meat, which drives them (and the others) towards cannibalism. Writer Claire Molloy viewed this as a satire on human meat consumption practices.
- In the THX Tex 2: Moo Can trailer (better known as just Tex 2), a robot mascot named Tex of the American audio company THX uses a moo can to perform a Deep Note mooed by cows. This trailer first premiered with the original theatrical release of Alien Resurrection in November 1997. It was seen on Pixar and 20th Century Fox DVDs (1997-2005).
- In Invader Zim, the secretary for the school nurse is seen using the toy in the controversial episode "Dark Harvest".
- In the 2005 film Constantine the main character, John Constantine, trades a moo box designed to imitate the bleat of a sheep with his friend and ally Beeman in exchange for holy objects and weapons. Later, after Beeman's death, many moo boxes can be seen in Beeman's office in the bowling alley, indicating he was a collector.
- Moo Can was seen in the Despicable Me trailer, where two Minions are playing with a toy.

== See also ==
- Groan Tube
