= Music education for young children =

Subarea of music education

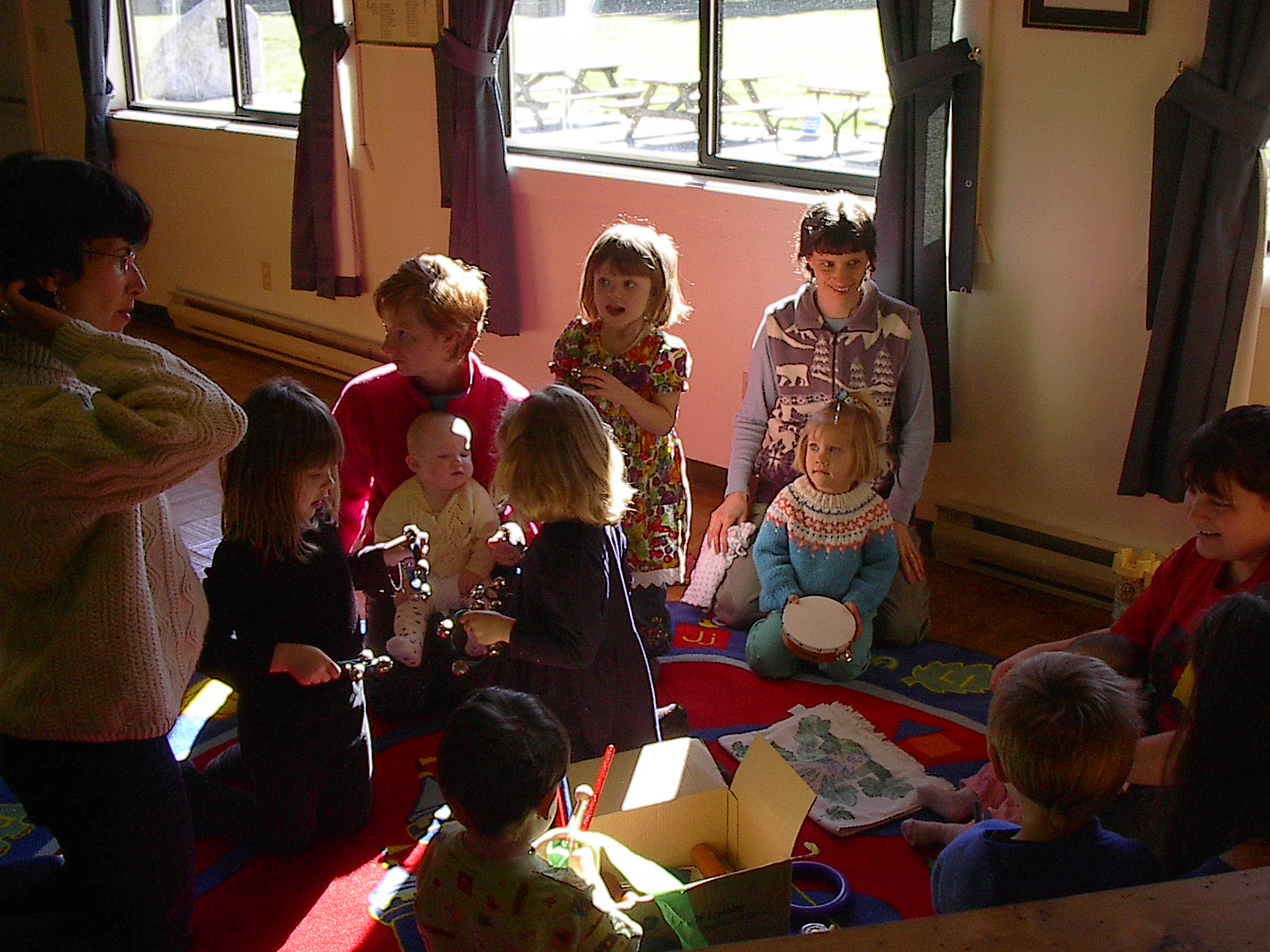
Mamatoto Playgroup, Lions' Club Hall. Mamatoto in Swahili means "motherbaby". Mamatoto groups have been started throughout the world to support this unit of mother and baby.

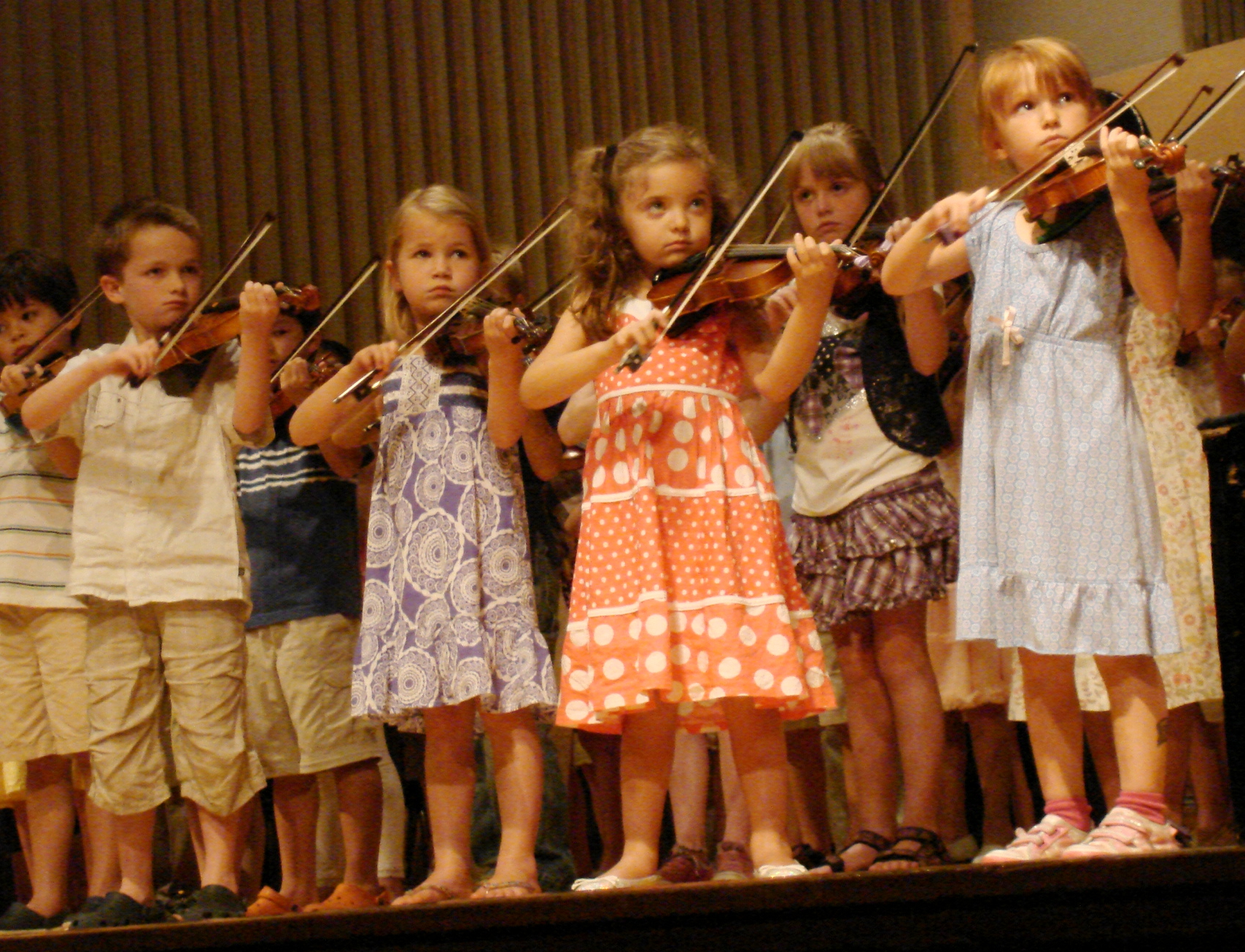
Suzuki Violin group, Suzuki Institute.

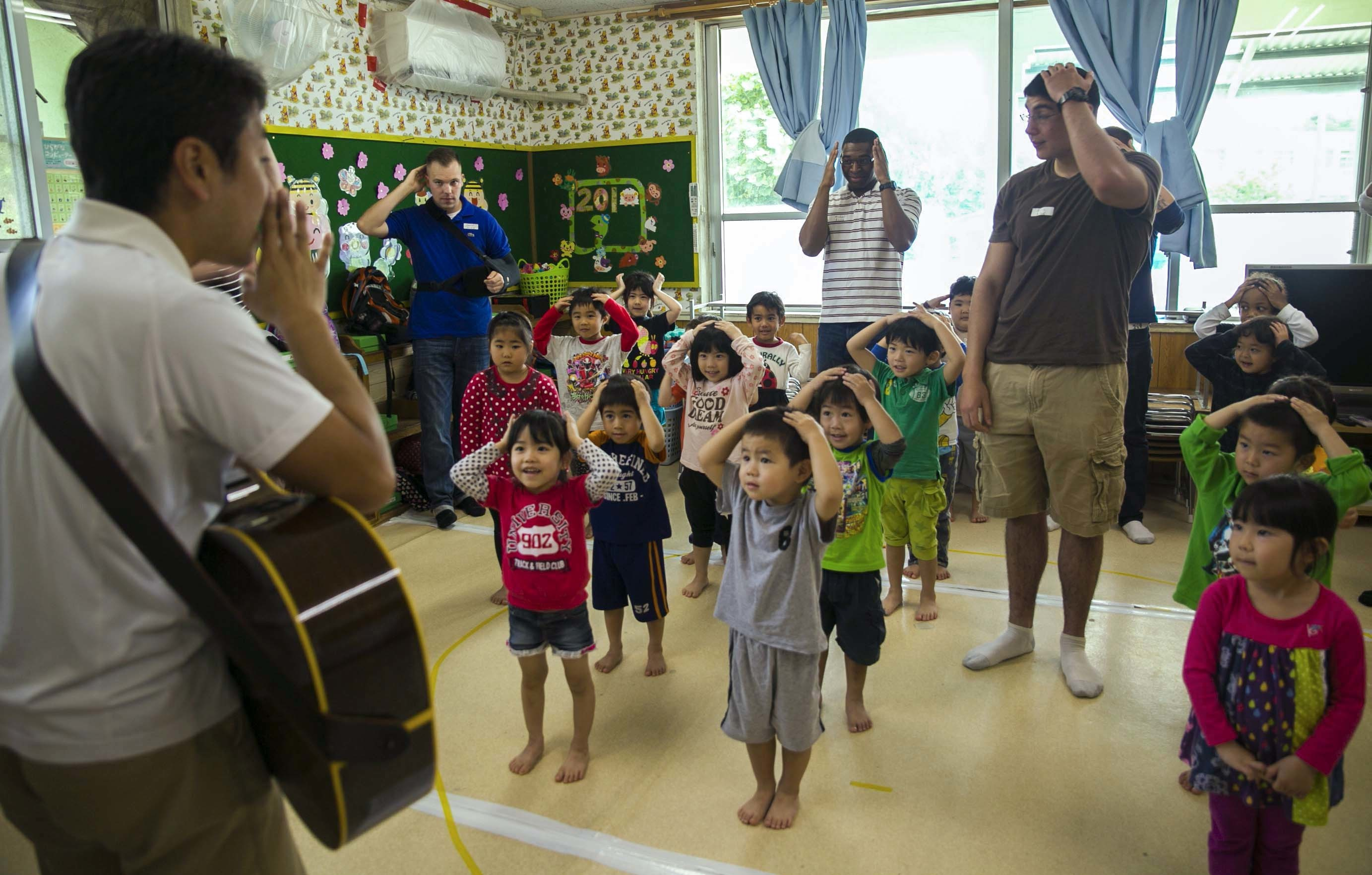
Children's action songs offer rich learning experiences that have children memorize information in various ways. Children learn musically, vocally, visually, and physically while listening to children's action songs. Combining these learning modes in children's action songs helps improve information memorization, recall, and fine and gross motor skills.

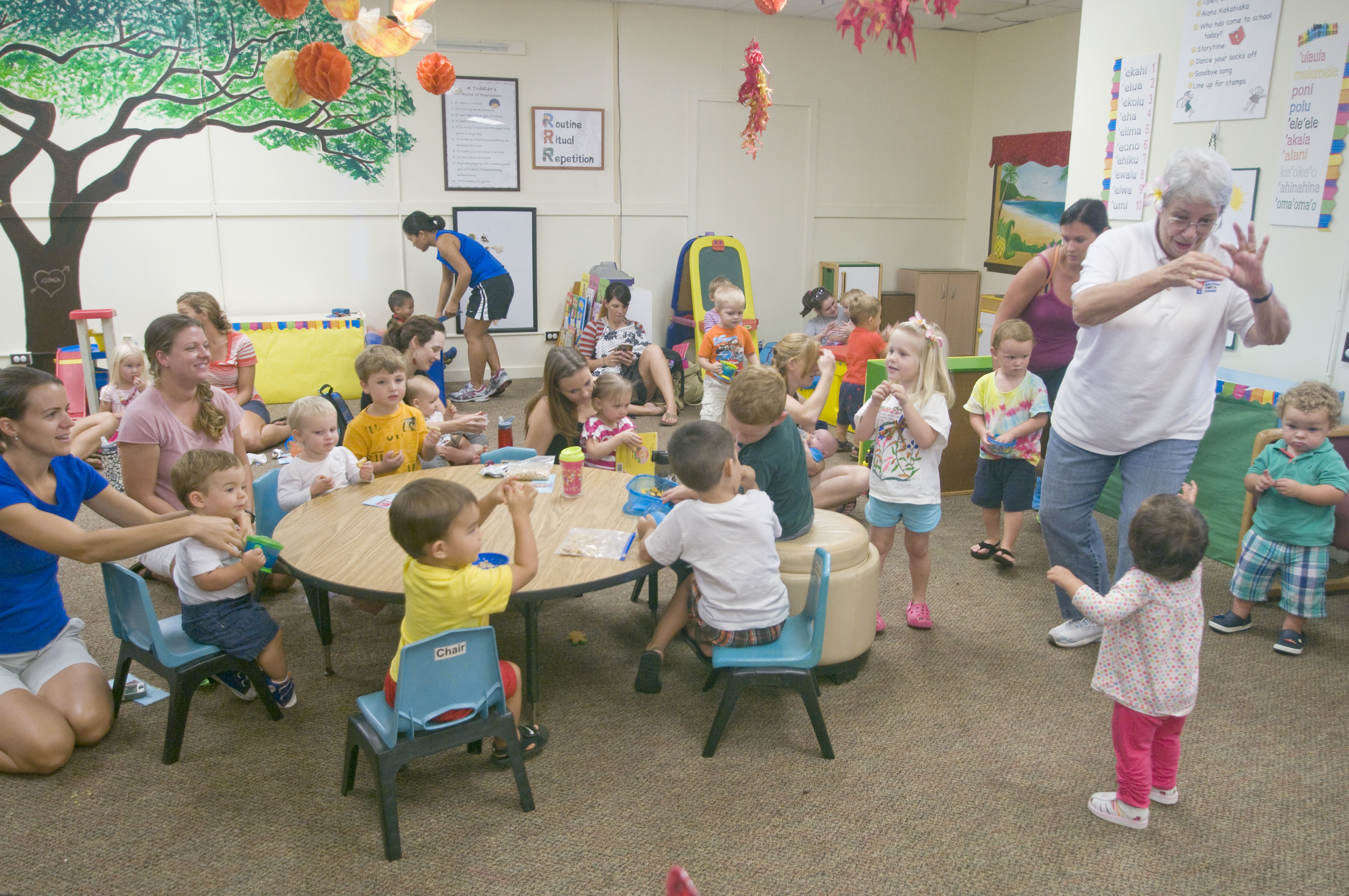
Fingerplays and action rhymes are short poems, lyrics, chants, or stories that can be used as musical experiences for your child to learn through hand motions—the lyrics pair words and actions, which correspond to hand movements. For centuries, parents, grandparents, and instructors, the keepers of history, have fashioned and passed down fingerplays and action rhymes.

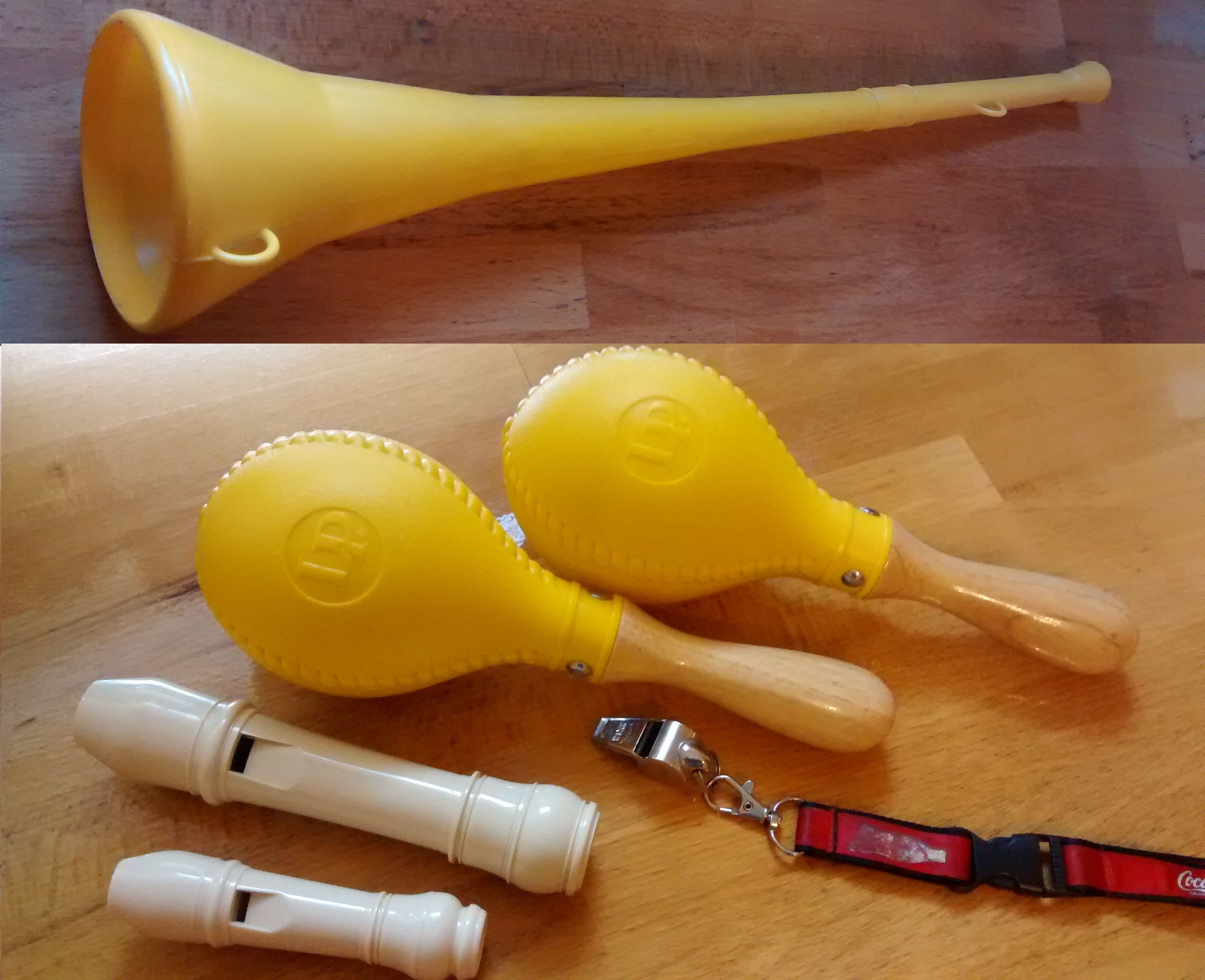
Some very loud instruments that are suitable for children: vuvuzela, Soprano and alto recorder head joints, pea whistle, very loud maracas (LP 281)

Music education for young children is an educational field introducing children in a playful manner to singing, speech, music, motion and organology. It is a subarea of music education.

== Benefits ==
There are many benefits that music provides for children as they continue to grow. The benefits that young children acquire through music include social skills, emotional self-regulating abilities, cognitive benefits, and physical benefits. Socially, children have the opportunity to learn how to take turns and play with others while still playing individually, for example a band of little players each playing their instrument but still looking at the big picture of playing with a group of little friends as well. Music also allows a smooth transition throughout daily activities; whether it be at home or in a classroom setting children get the idea of the following activity.

Allowing children to play with others, including adults or older siblings also gives them a boost of self-esteem. Also, different songs show children the different words used for emotions and body awareness, as well as extending their vocabulary in general. Additionally, by extending children’s vocabulary they can also learn about different cultural music and languages, for some the benefit to integrate home within their care-giving setting. Cognitive benefits also include learning how to count, recognizing sequencing and patterns, phonemic awareness, memorizing different songs for different experiences, and simply memorizing songs and their pace and tone. Physically, children’s all-around gross and fine motor skills grow rapidly by learning how to move their body to music, moving their bodies to actions of a song, and as they grow by learning how to hold and play an instrument.

== Forms and activities ==
Music education for young children is offered privately through classes and music organizations or integrated into education in private and public schools. Activities and classes can start as early as prenatal or newborn and in private education, music programs are often integrated as early as preschool. Early childhood music education in public school settings widely varies, but music programs have been established in some schools starting in kindergarten even in remote areas.

Most early childhood music education is accomplished through parent or teacher-guided interactive play. Prenatal activities can include singing and playing music so that it can be heard in the womb and continued with newborns. From birth, children can listen to music and observe other children in music classes and participate in tactile and parent-assisted activities. With parental assistance, infants can partake in body movement and rhythm exercises to sung songs and recorded music and through play. As these children develop independent motor skills, they progress to doing these activities on their own. Infants and toddlers are often encouraged to sing and explore rhythm through body movements and percussion instruments such as egg shakers, drums, and xylophones. As young children progress, activities can include concepts that introduce counting, solfege, and notation. Some programs then allow for young children to shift easily into more formalized dance and instrumental instruction starting at a very early age.

Many children like making very loud music respectively noise. In this case, it is common to use noisemakers like very loud maracas, pea whistles, the head joint of a recorder or vuvuzelas for rhythm exercises. This is usually only done privately at home because of the noise regulations in school courses.

== Pedagogies of early childhood music education ==
Several pedagogical approaches exist which promote specific methods of training young children in music, many of which share commonalities, such as music and rhythm development through body movements, folk songs, aural training, and the belief that music literacy from an early age is beneficial. They include:

- Orff Schulwerk: This approach encourages children to learn music through a combination of movement, rhythm, and playing instruments. It focuses on improvisation and creative expression.
- Kodály Method: This method uses solfege syllables and hand signs to teach pitch and rhythm. It starts with folk songs and emphasizes singing before introducing instruments.
- Suzuki Method: Based on the principles of "Mother Tongue", or the belief that music learning builds on the principles of language learning and therefore needs to start at a very early age, this method introduces music to children as they would their native language. Listening, imitation, and repetition are key components.
- Dalcroze Eurhythmics: This approach emphasizes the connection between music and movement. Children explore rhythm and musical concepts through physical activities.

== World music ==
Studies done on children who have had a musical background have shown that it increases brain function as well as brain stimulation. When children are exposed to music from other countries and cultures, they can learn about the instrument while at the same time being educated about different cultural traditions of the world.

== See also ==
- Music education
- Music and movement
- El Sistema
