= Amy Clarke (musician) =

American singer-songwriter

- Born: 1976 (age 49–50); Silver Spring, Maryland
- Education: Georgetown, Studio Theatre Conservatory, SAE Institute
- Occupations: singer-songwriter, pianist, percussionist
- Children: 1
- Writing career
- Notable works: After The Fall EP; A New Way
- Website: amyclarke.com

Amy Clarke (born 1976 in Silver Spring, Maryland) is an American singer-songwriter, pianist, experimental synth keyboardist, percussionist and activist. Classically trained, she is known for mixing acoustic piano and contemporary electronics, and features her lyrics and vocals over rock, jazz, tribal, and world rhythms. With a powerful and wide range, Clarke can flow from a cappella to acoustic piano and eclectic percussion, blending complex rhythms. She has been described as "accomplished" and "amazing." Robert Leggett wrote that "after listening ... it is very difficult to just sit idly by – the listener is compelled to get involved."

Clarke has opened for and shared stages with artists like Sarah McLachlan and the Indigo Girls, Starhawk, Poe, and drummer Dave Greene. She has played at Burning Man, Make Music L.A., South By Southwest, L.A.'s Cross Pollinate, and at New York City's The Cutting Room, The Bitter End, Washington, D.C.'s the Black Cat and Busboys and Poets, Los Angeles' the Viper Room, The House of Blues Sunset Strip, Hotel Café and other venues. Her albums are A New Way (2017) and the EP After the Fall (2006).

A feminist, environmental community activist based in Los Angeles, she was a representative on the Silver Lake Neighborhood Council (SLNC) from 2012 to 2015, serving as an at-large representative and co-chair of the SLNC Governing Board for the latter two years.

== Early life and education ==
Clarke was born in Silver Spring, Maryland to teachers Donna M. and Stephen A. Clarke: Donna taught elementary school English and history and Stephen high school math. Clarke studied classical piano from age 4 until 15 with Marian Smith Nee, who was affiliated with Catholic University. She earned a Bachelor of Science in Foreign Service from Georgetown University with a focus on Culture and Politics in International Affairs, and, later, a certificate in Electronic Music Production from the SAE Institute of Technology in New York City.

== Early career ==
After college, she attended the Studio Theatre Conservatory in Washington D.C. and appeared in mainstage productions at Studio Theatre. During the 2000–01 season she starred in Keith Alan Baker's Wonderland Alice on Studio Theatre's Second Stage. The production was the cover story of Washington, D.C.'s Metro Weekly. The next year, Clarke played a Daughter of Ocean in a Helen Hayes Award-nominated production of Aeschylus's Prometheus, directed by the theater's founding artistic director Joy Zinoman. The cast recording is on file with the Library of Congress.

== Career ==
She moved to New York City in 2004, playing extensively on the downtown music circuit in places like M Shanghai Den, the Slipper Room, Piano's and C-Note. She then independently produced and released her debut "After The Fall" EP from her home studio in 2006 to notable acclaim, and a wave of touring Jed Ryan of PM Entertainment magazine wrote

It's only after repeated plays of Amy Clarke's debut album that the listener realizes just how much this New York City-based artist packs into each of the EP's five songs. Every one of the tracks on Clarke's CD is a bona fide masterpiece.... To backtrack a little, it's Ms. Clarke's lyrics and voice on "After the Fall" that grab the listener immediately.... The singer-songwriter pays tribute to strong, independent women and the men and women who love them, reinforcing the need for love, equality, and tolerance for all. And while promoting these causes, she makes music that sounds really, really wondrous.

Clarke played Washington, D.C.'s The Black Cat, The Red and The Black, New York's The Cutting Room, The Bitter End, and Rockwood Music Hall, Denver's Mercury Cafe, among other places, to promote the album.

Clarke moved to Silver Lake, Los Angeles in fall 2007 with her then-partner who was working on the opening of a nightclub in Hollywood and immediately hit the live music scene there, playing many Hollywood and surrounding venues like Karma coffeehouse, The Derby, and the Viper Room while building a new local network.

She played SXSW in 2008 at the Desert Highway Extravaganza at Momo's bar and music venue on 6th Street and the R.O.O.T Acoustic Foundation at Austin Java café. She also played that year at the Method Fest Independent Film Festival in Calabasas, California and at Washington D.C.'s Busboys and Poets as artist of the month. In February 2009, she started the first of several on-stage collaborations with Dave Greene, drummer for Tom Petty & The Heartbreakers, Joe Walsh, and Steve Ferrone at House of Blues Sunset Strip.

In the spring, she released the single "MARY (her story)", engineered by Sejo Navajas (Vicious Licks/Kamikaze Red) at 4th St Recording and co-produced with Steve Leavitt (Don't Call Us Tori) and played at King King in Hollywood and Make Music Pasadena, among other places. She toured solo in August playing in L.A., New York, D.C., Maryland, Virginia, Tennessee, and at Burning Man. She started 2010 opening for Poe in a pre-Grammy show in Hollywood. Via a direct relief benefit for Haiti, she played Hollywood's Crane's, Playhouse, the Den and Sidewalk Cafe New York City. She played House of Blues Sunset Strip twice and was a featured artist at the Los Angeles Women in Music.

While volunteering for the nonprofit Reverb at the 2010 revival of the Lilith Fair), she saw the Yamaha Motif in the Yamaha tent and starting experimenting on it, drawing a crowd. After her impromptu set, she was subsequently appointed social media ambassador for the penultimate Lilith show for her home town of Washington, D.C., where she interviewed MacLachlan, the Indigo Girls, Butterfly Boucher, Courtyard Hounds, Lissie, and others backstage at the Merriweather Post Pavilion in Columbia, Maryland. She played her first gig at Hotel Cafe that fall and played while Visionary artist Amanda Sage painted live the next year.

She released her "We Are The Web" single in time for winter solstice 2012, then over her next three years turned her energies towards more local community festivals, gatherings, including opening for Starhawk in L.A. three different years. In 2013, Clarke was featured locally in Silver Lake opening for an Occupy Love screening at Los Globos, and both in Make Music Silver Lake and The Princess Bride screening at the free Silver Lake Picture Show in Sunset Triangle Plaza. She played at the Burning Man Decompression festival at LA State Historical Park in October, and, later in the month, shared the stage with members of alt-rock bands The 88, The Crazy Squeeze, Foo Fighters and Blind Melon and DJs Lance Rock and Lina Lecaro at the Rockin' Great Pumpkin Fest at Micheltorena Elementary. She headlined at the feminist Cross Pollinate event opening for Starhawk, then did the same at the Reclaiming LA Annual Spiral Dance at Club Fais Do Do, first of subsequent gigs from 2013 to 2015.

She released the single, "Goddess," in 2016. Clarke is currently finishing her album project, A New Way, which was recorded at 4th Street Recording and mastered by Stephen Marsh of Marsh Mastering, for a fall 2017 release, and is drawing in strategic alliances, grants, and sponsors for her future sustainable tours.

== Critical reception ==
Her music has been featured on national, cable and internet TV; Harborough FM (UK), Clear Channel FM, Radio Crystal Blue (Internet radio), and Sirius Satellite Radio; she has been interviewed on both TV and radio. Larry Wines of the No Depression: Journal of Roots Music blog wrote of hearing her, "accomplished, amazing, and really going places." Robert Leggett for the L.A. Examiner wrote in 2010 that "her music has developed into a fine-edged tool for presenting her message to the masses" and that "after listening ... it is very difficult to just sit idly by – the listener is compelled to get involved." He described her music "ethereal, dreamy and classy."

== Civic work ==
Clarke has served Silver Lake gardens, schools, and its neighborhood council. She was appointed I was appointed regional representative (Region 2) to the Silver Lake Neighborhood Council (SLNC) in December 2012. She co-chaired the arts and culture committee with Charles Renn and was included in an LA Weekly cover story on the changing political structure of her neighborhood in fall 2013, in the April 12, 2014 local elections, Clarke collected the most votes for a seat on the neighborhood council, 752. As part of the "Yours Not Ours" coalition that went against the incumbent "Empower Silver Lake," she told the Los Feliz Ledger, "We’re entering kind of a new phase of the community being able to unite more together around some common goals. There are new outreach strategies emerging; there are new communities being forged, and there are new bonds being grown." She was then elected co-chair of the 21-member governing board by her peers. She resigned in November 2015 to re-focus on her music.

She has also helped raise funding and awareness for the preservation of the public stairways in Silver Lake, volunteered with the Micheltorena Community Garden on Sunset Boulevard and L.A.'s spirituality community. She spoke, played drums, and shared original music her my keyboard on the steps of City Hall at the March for Truth in L.A., among other protests. She also collaborates with other artists and nonprofit organizations through her Gaia Grove project, combining healing arts, music, and environmental activism in creative, collective work.

== Awards ==
- ASCAP Plus award, 2007
- ASCAP Plus award, 2008
- ASCAP Plus award, 2009
- Busboys and Poets Artist of the Month, October 2009
- ASCAP Plus award, 2010
- ASCAP Plus award, 2011
