= Groan tube =

Toy that produces a sound when turned on one end

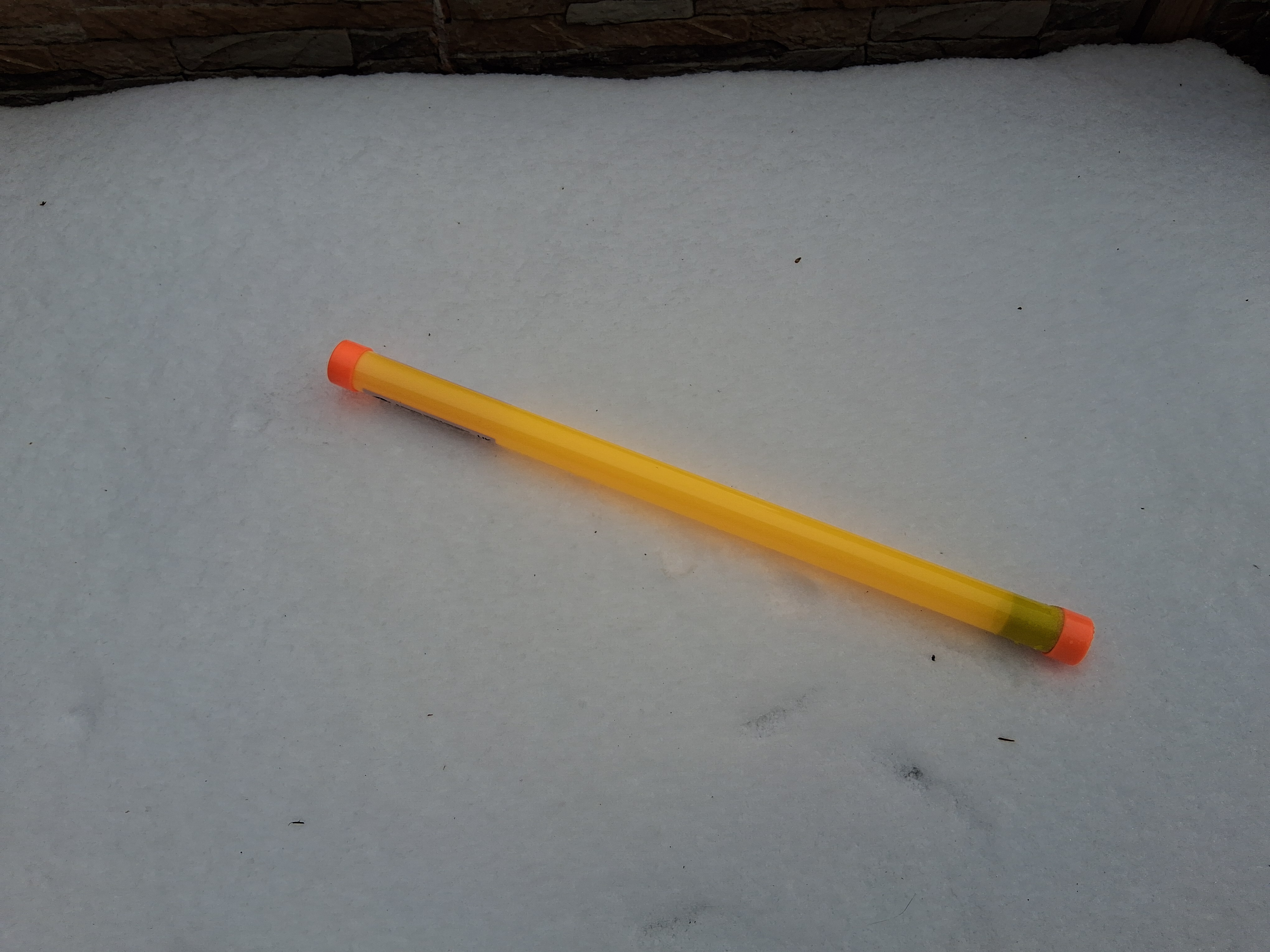
Groan Tube

Groan Tube

A groan tube is a toy that, when turned on one end, makes a distinct "groan" sound. This is due to a noise maker in the tube that vibrates in the air as it falls, making the noise.

The groan tube was invented in the early 1960s by Japanese toy manufacturer Kureo. The toy was first sold as 'Magic Noise Tube" (魔法音管). Mattel was the first company to sell the product in the United States in 1973. The Jibba Jabber toy, made by Ertl, produced a similar sound.

== In popular culture ==
It was also utilized in the Italian comedy show LOL: chi ride è fuori released on Amazon Prime Video. The Italian comedian Frank Matano used the Groan Tube for comedic purposes and it immediately went viral in the country.

== See also ==
- Moo box
