= Vuvuzela =

Wind instrument

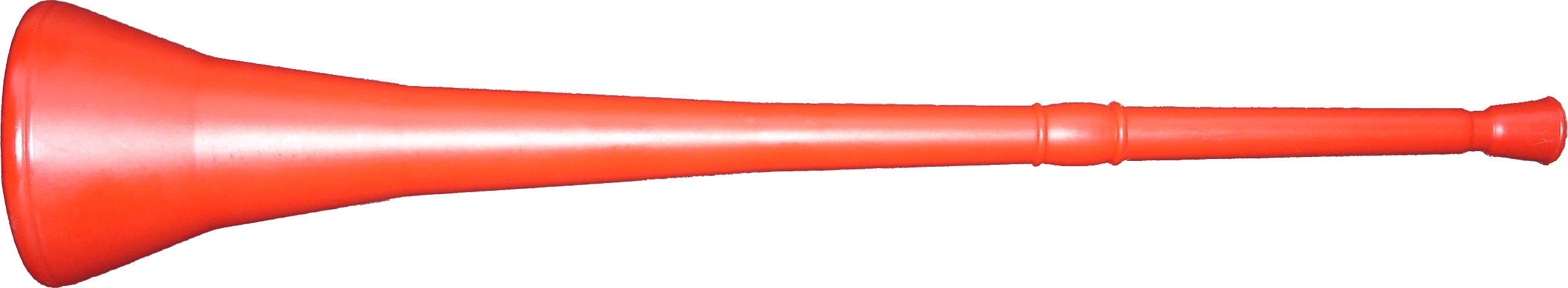

Brass instrument
- Classification: Brass: Wind; Brass; Aerophone
- Hornbostel–Sachs classification: 423.121.22 (Tubular end-blown trumpet with mouthpiece)

Playing range
- Varies by instrument, typically around B♭

Related instruments
- Bugle

Vuvuzela note
A standard short 58-centimetre (1.9 ft) vuvuzela plays a single B♭ note.

The vuvuzela (/vuːvuːˈzɛlə/) is a horn with an inexpensive injection-moulded plastic shell about 65 centimetres (2 ft) long, which produces a loud monotone note typically around B♭ 3 (the first B♭ below middle C). Some models are made in two parts to facilitate storage, and this design also allows pitch variation. Many types of vuvuzela, made by several manufacturers, may produce various intensity and frequency outputs. The intensity of these outputs depends on the blowing technique and pressure exerted.

The vuvuzela is commonly used at football matches in South Africa, and it has become a symbol of South African football as the stadiums are filled with its sound. The intensity of the sound caught the attention of the global football community during the 2009 FIFA Confederations Cup in anticipation of South Africa hosting the 2010 FIFA World Cup.

The vuvuzela has been the subject of controversy when used by spectators at football matches. Its high volume can lead to permanent hearing loss for unprotected ears after close-range exposure, with a sound level of 120 dB(A) (the threshold of pain) at one metre (3.3 ft) from the device opening. The sound level resulted in a permanent ban in several sports organisations and facilities.

== Origin ==
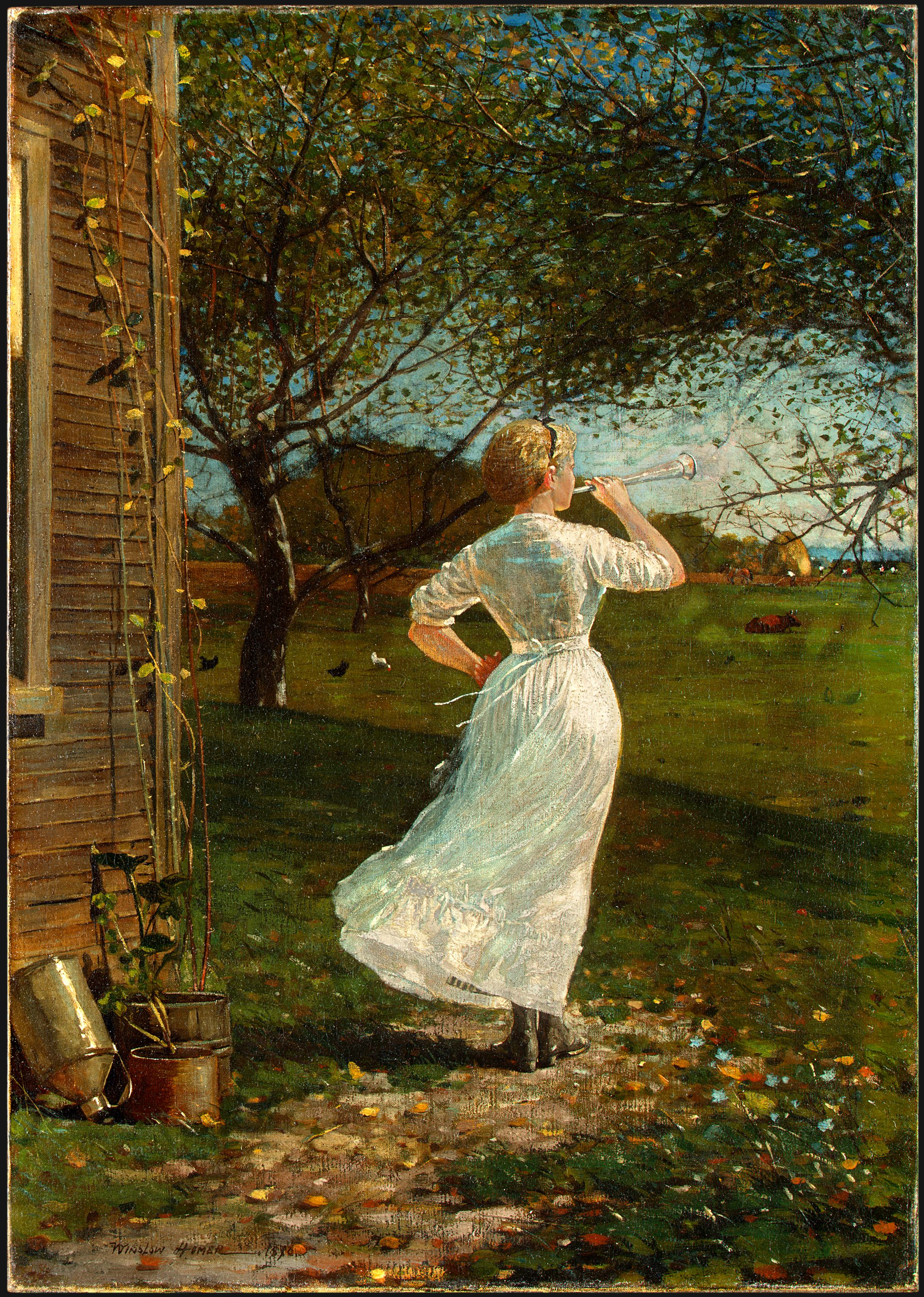
"The Dinner Horn" ("Blowing the Horn at Seaside"), by Winslow Homer, 1870

Plastic aerophones, like corneta and similar devices, have been used in Brazil and other Latin American countries since the 1960s, also similar "Stadium Horns" have been marketed and available in the United States since that same date.

Similar horns have been in existence for much longer. An instrument that looks like a vuvuzela appears in Winslow Homer's 1870 painting "The Dinner Horn".

The origin of the device is disputed. The term vuvuzela was first used in South Africa from the Zulu language or from a Nguni language. It is also known in the Sepedi language as Lepatata; a Bokoni dialect word meaning to make a blowing sound (directly translated: ukuvuvuzela).

Controversies over the invention arose in early 2010. South African Kaizer Chiefs fan Freddie "Saddam" Maake claimed the invention of the vuvuzela by fabricating an aluminium version in 1965 from a bicycle horn and has photographic evidence of himself holding the aluminium vuvuzela in the 1970s, 1980s and 1990s. He also claimed to have coined vuvuzela from the Zulu language for "welcome", "unite" and "celebration". Plastics factory Masincedane Sport popularised the ubiquitous plastic vuvuzela commonly heard at South African football games in 2002; and the Nazareth Baptist Church claimed the vuvuzela belonged to their church.

== International tournaments ==
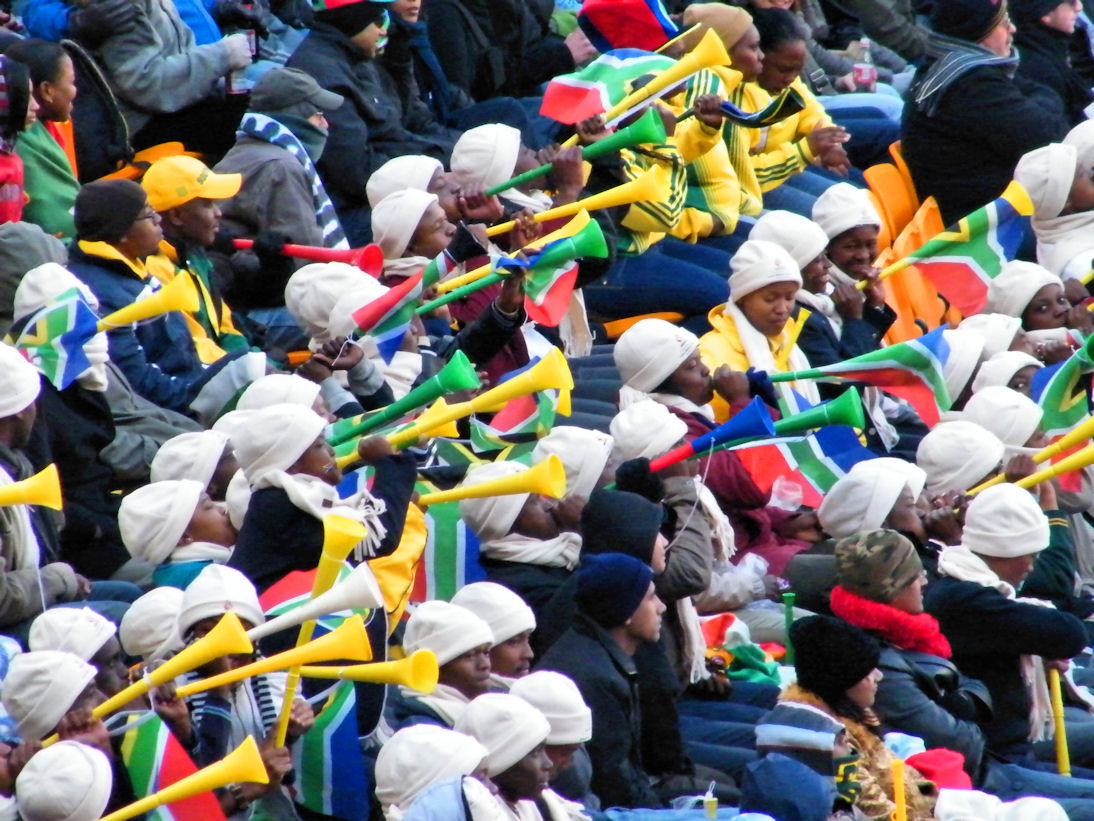
A 2010 FIFA World Cup crowd blowing vuvuzelas

The world association football governing body, FIFA, proposed banning vuvuzelas from stadiums, as they were seen as potential weapons for hooligans. Columnist Jon Qwelane described the device as "an instrument from hell". South African football authorities argued that the vuvuzela was part of the South African football experience. The Spanish midfielder Xabi Alonso said, "Those trumpets? That noise I don't like ... FIFA must ban those things ... it is not nice to have a noise like that". Dutch coach Bert van Marwijk remarked, "... it was annoying ... in the stadiums you get used to it but it is still unpleasant".

Commentator Farayi Mungazi said, "Banning the vuvuzela would take away the distinctiveness of a South African World Cup ... absolutely essential for an authentic South African footballing experience". FIFA President Sepp Blatter responded, "we should not try to Europeanise an African World Cup ... that is what African and South Africa football is all about – noise, excitement, dancing, shouting and enjoyment". Despite the criticisms, FIFA agreed to permit their use in stadiums during the 2009 FIFA Confederations Cup and 2010 FIFA World Cup. The South African football authority argued that during FIFA World Cup 2010, vuvuzelas achieved great popularity, though TV spectators suffered a lot due to vuvuzela noise pollution.

=== 2010 FIFA World Cup ===
==== Marketing ====
Hyundai constructed the world's largest working vuvuzela as part of a marketing campaign for the World Cup. The 35-metre (115 ft) blue vuvuzela mounted on the Foreshore Freeway Bridge, Cape Town, was intended to be used at the beginning of each match; however, it did not sound a note during the World Cup, as its volume was a cause of concern to city authorities.

==== Reception ====
Noisy Vuvuzelas cause concern
Voice of America report on the impact of vuvuzelas at the 2010 FIFA World Cup.

Its ubiquity led to many suggestions for limiting its use, muffling its sound, and even an outright ban.

Broadcasting organisations experienced difficulties with their presentations. Television and radio audiences often only heard the sound of the vuvuzelas. The BBC, RTÉ, ESPN and BSkyB have examined the possibility of filtering the ambient noise while maintaining game commentary.

The vuvuzelas raised health and safety concerns. Competitors believed the incessant noise hampered the ability of the players to get their rest, and degraded the quality of team performance. Other critics remarked that vuvuzelas disrupted team communication and players' concentration during matches. Demand for earplugs to protect from hearing loss during the World Cup outstripped supply, with many pharmacies out of stock. One major vuvuzela manufacturer even began selling its own earplugs to spectators.

==== Audio filtration ====
Notch filtering, an audio filtration technique, is proposed to reduce the vuvuzela sound in broadcasts and increase clarity of commentary audio. The vuvuzela produces notes at a frequency of approximately 235 Hz and its first partial at 465 Hz. However, this filtration technique affects the clarity of commentary audio. Proposals of adaptive filters by universities and research organisations address this issue by preserving the amplitude and clarity of the commentators' voices and crowd noise. Such filtration techniques have been adopted by some cable television providers.

=== 2018 FIFA World Cup ===
Vuvuzelas made a comeback at the 2018 FIFA World Cup in Russia, used mainly by Iranian supporters. Much like in 2010, there was a backlash against their use.

== Health effects and regulation ==
=== Health concerns ===
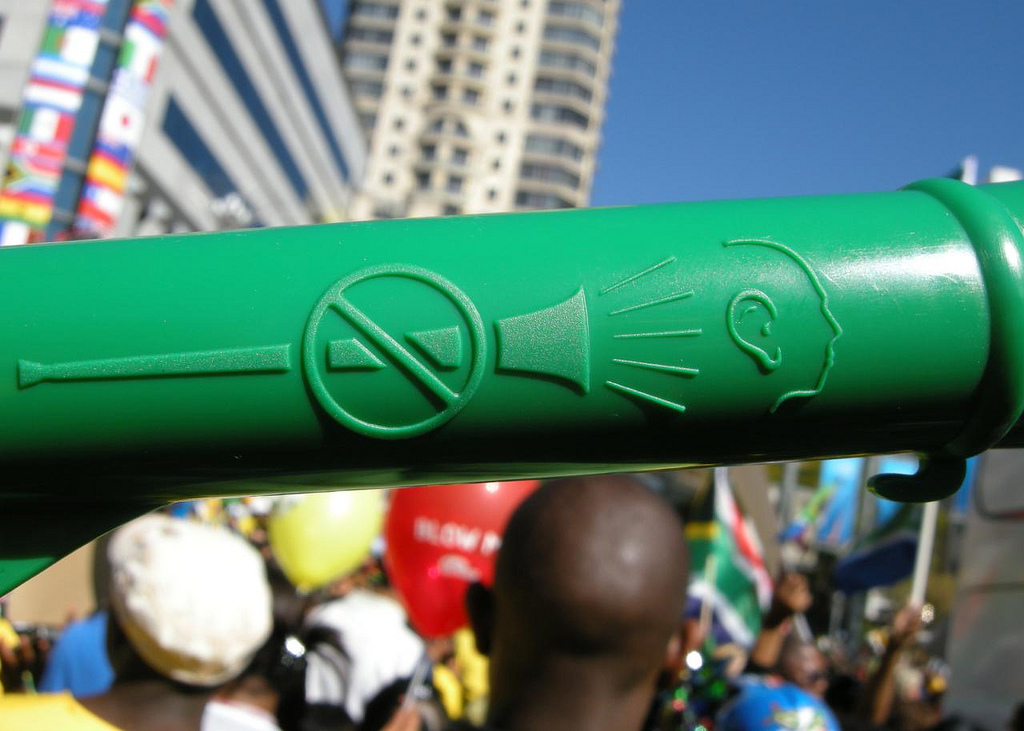
Some vuvuzelas carry a safety warning graphic.

A study conducted in 2010 by Ruth McNerney of the London School of Hygiene & Tropical Medicine and colleagues concluded that the airborne transmission of diseases by means of vuvuzelas was possible. They measured tiny droplets emitted from a vuvuzela that can carry flu and cold germs that are small enough to stay suspended in the air for hours, and can enter the airways of a person's lungs. The study concluded that vuvuzelas can infect others on a greater scale than coughing or shouting.

The vuvuzelas have the potential to cause noise-induced hearing loss. Prof James Hall III, Dirk Koekemoer, De Wet Swanepoel and colleagues at the University of Pretoria found that vuvuzelas can have a negative effect when a listener's eardrums are exposed to the instrument's high-intensity sound. The vuvuzelas produce an average sound pressure of 113 dB(A) at two metres (7 ft) from the device opening. The study finds that subjects should not be exposed to more than 15 minutes per day at an intensity of 100 dB(A). The study assumes that if a single vuvuzela emits a sound that is dangerously loud to subjects within a two-metre (7 ft) radius, and numerous vuvuzelas are typically blown together for the duration of a match, it may put spectators at a significant risk of hearing loss. Hearing loss experts at the U.S. National Institute for Occupational Safety and Health (NIOSH) recommend that exposure at the 113 dB(A) level not exceed 45 seconds per day. A newer model has a modified mouthpiece that reduces the volume by 20 dB.

=== Noise levels and bans ===
==== Football ====
- 2014, 2018, 2022, and 2026 FIFA World Cups
- UEFA, including all Champions League, Europa League, and European Championship matches
- Ligue 1 (ban across all clubs)
- Nine English Premier League clubs have banned the device. Five clubs (Arsenal, Birmingham City, Everton, Fulham and Liverpool) have banned them due to health and safety reasons while Sunderland, West Ham United, and West Bromwich Albion have barred them because of policy against musical instruments. Manchester United banned vuvuzelas from Old Trafford on 13 August 2010. However, two clubs (Manchester City and Stoke City) have allowed them.
- LaLiga? (if all teams were to sign a law to forbid the instrument)
- Copa del Rey matches ban the instruments if they signed a law.
- ÖFB Bundesliga
- Bundesliga (certain teams, including Werder Bremen and Borussia Dortmund).

==== Other sports ====
- The organisers of the 2012 Olympic Games placed a ban on vuvuzelas at the sporting event.
- The indoor noise level caused the U.S. NCAA to permanently ban them after the 7 February 1987 Division I Men's Ice Hockey game "The Big Red Freakout!" between the Brown Bears and the Rensselaer Polytechnic Institute Engineers. The noise was so extreme that Brown University formally complained and "The RPI Rule" was universally adopted.
- Kontinental Hockey League
- 2010 FIBA World Championship and other basketball tournaments from then on
- Rugby World Cup (starting in 2011)
- The now-defunct Champions League Twenty20 cricket tournament.
- The Southeastern Conference of US college sports
- Ultimate Fighting Championship events.
- Gaelic Athletic Association events
- National Football League (as part of an overall ban of noisemakers)
- Little League World Series
- Vermont Principals' Association High school sports
- The Evolution Championship Series for fighting games.

==== Locations ====
- Wembley Stadium (as part of an overall ban of noisemakers)
- All sporting events at the Cardiff City, Sophia Gardens, and Millennium Stadiums
- Wimbledon
- Lord's Cricket Ground
- Melbourne Cricket Ground
- The WACA Ground in Perth.
- The Gabba Cricket Ground in Brisbane.
- The Sydney Cricket Ground
- Eden Park (in addition to generally at the 2011 Rugby World Cup).
- Lancaster Park
- Wellington Stadium
- Yankee Stadium
- Fuji Rock Festival
- Providence Park

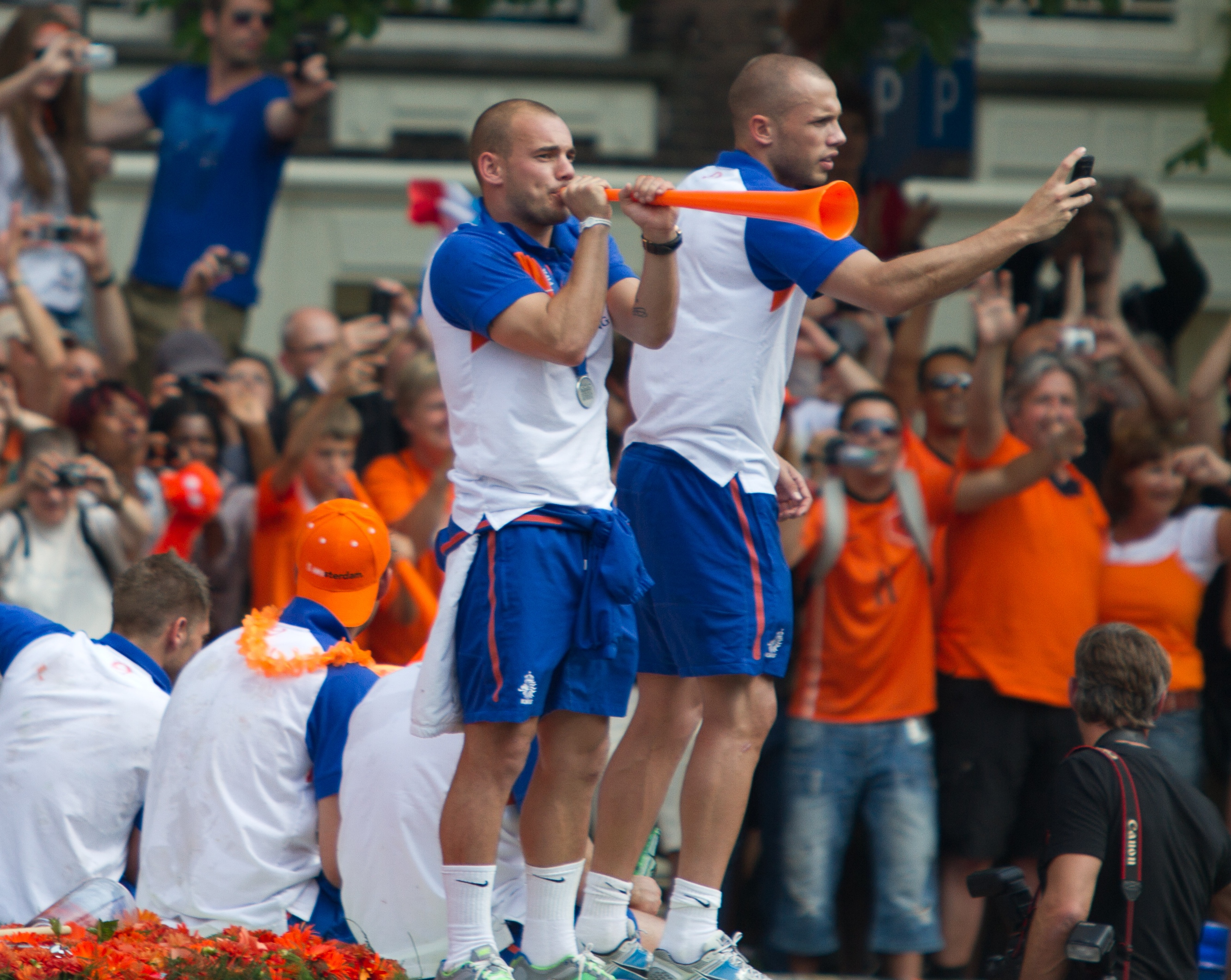
Dutch football player Wesley Sneijder blowing on a vuvuzela

Some shopping centres in South Africa banned the use of vuvuzelas. They were also banned at the 2010 Baltimore anime convention Otakon. The convention committee declared that any attendee carrying a vuvuzela could have it confiscated from them, and that anyone blowing one could face expulsion from the event.

Another such action was taken in response to the prevalence of the vuvuzelas at the 2010 Anime Expo based in Los Angeles, attended by representatives of Otakon who felt the disruption led to discomfort for some of the attendees of Anime Expo which they wished to avoid at the later Baltimore event.

== Usage in protests ==
On 13 July 2010, protesters with vuvuzelas converged on BP's London headquarters to protest the company's handling of the Deepwater Horizon oil spill.

Vuvuzelas were widely used during the 2011 Wisconsin pro-union protests against governor Scott Walker, after a Madison DJ, Nick Nice, ordered 200 of them and distributed them to his fellow protesters. According to Nice, this caused vuvuzelas to be included in the list of items banned at the state's capitol. The list does not specifically mention vuvuzelas, but does include "Musical Instrument/noise makers".

In March 2012, German protesters used vuvuzelas during the official traditional torchlight ceremony, the Großer Zapfenstreich, which bid farewell to President of Germany Christian Wulff. Wulff had resigned earlier over corruption allegations, yet he still received the honour of the military ceremony, which left Germany divided.

== Usage in music and media ==
Usage of vuvuzela in art music is limited. One of the few compositions made for it is a baroque-style double concerto in C major for vuvuzela, organ (or harpsichord) and string orchestra, written by Timo Kiiskinen, Professor of Church Music at the Sibelius Academy, Helsinki; an organ version of this concerto was premiered, on 21 October 2010, at the Organ Hall of Sibelius Academy, and a harpsichord version, and on 19 December 2010, at Pro Puu gallery in Lahti.

The vuvuzela is suitable as a toy musical instrument and for the music education for young children. Because of the noise regulations in school courses, the vuvuzela is usually only played privately at home.

In the Nintendo DS version of the music video game Michael Jackson: The Experience, there is an anti-piracy feature created by Ubisoft that will freeze the game and replace the audio with the sound of vuvuzelas if the player is playing a pirated or ROM version of the game.

The song "Olvidate (Ya Ves)" by Argentinian band Los Piojos uses a vuvuzela as part of the main melody, more easily heard in the live version from their 1999 live album Ritual.

== See also ==
- Cowbell — a hand percussion instrument used in various styles of music, as well as a noise-maker for spectators at endurance sports events
- Football rattle — a percussion instrument which produces a clicking and rattling noise
- Makarapa — hand-made hats worn by spectators to show their team support
- Thundersticks — narrow plastic balloons used as promotional noise makers
- Portable or personal air horns — produce sounds similar to the vuvuzela
