= Amy Butler =

Amy Butler may refer to:

- Amy Butler (designer), American fabric and pattern designer
- Amy Butler (minister), mainline Protestant minister
