= George Hill =

George Hill may refer to:

== People ==
=== Academia ===
- George Hill (minister) (1750–1819), Scottish minister and academic
- George Anthony Hill (1842–1962), American assistant professor at Harvard and author of textbooks
- George William Hill (1838–1914), American mathematician and astronomer

=== Arts ===
- George Hill (director) (1895–1934), American film director (The Big House)
- George Birkbeck Hill (1835–1903), English editor and author
- George Roy Hill (1921–2002), American film director (Butch Cassidy and the Sundance Kid and The Sting)
- George Snow Hill (1898–1969), American painter and sculptor
- George William Hill (sculptor) (1862–1934), Canadian sculptor

=== British peers ===
- Sir George Hill, 2nd Baronet (1763–1839), MP for Londonderry
- Sir George Hill, 3rd Baronet (1804–1845)
- Sir George Hill, 5th Baronet (1866–1878)
- Sir George Rowley Hill, 7th Baronet (1864–1954)
- Sir George Cyril Rowley Hill, 8th Baronet (1890–1980)
- Sir George Alfred Rowley Hill, 9th Baronet (1899–1985)

=== Military ===
- George Hill (Medal of Honor) (c. 1844 – unknown), American Medal of Honor recipient
- George Hill (RCAF officer) (1918–1969), Royal Canadian Air Force flying ace
- George Alexander Hill (1892–1968), British intelligence officer

=== Politics ===
- Lord George Hill (1801–1879), Anglo-Irish politician and landowner
- George Hill (Australian politician) (1802–1883), member of the New South Wales Legislative Council and mayor of Sydney
- George Hill (Idaho politician) (1868–1958), American politician from Idaho
- George Hill (Maine politician) (1903–1980), American politician from Maine
- George F. Hill (1832–1910), Canadian lawyer, merchant and politician in New Brunswick
- George Stilman Hill (1794–1858), American-born Canadian lawyer and politician in New Brunswick

=== Religion ===
- George R. Hill (1884–1971), American leader in the Church of Jesus Christ of Latter-day Saints
- George R. Hill III (1921–2001), American chemist and authority on coal, leader in the Church of Jesus Christ of Latter-day Saints
- George W. Hill (pastor) (1916–2003), American religious leader and peace activist

=== Sports ===
- George Hill (cricketer) (born 2001), English cricketer
- George Hill (rugby league) (born 2004), English rugby league footballer
- George Hill (runner) (1891–1944), long-distance runner from New Zealand
- George Hill (sprinter) (1901–1992), sprinter from the United States
- George Hill (figure skater) (1907–2002), American figure skating champion
- George Hill (racing driver) (1886–1967), American racecar driver
- George Hill (footballer) (1921–2002), Scottish football player and manager (Dundee, East Fife, Montrose)
- George Hill (basketball) (born 1986), American basketball player
- George Hill (American football) (active 1960–1999), American football coach
- George Hill (ice hockey), Canadian ice hockey player and coach
- George Rowland Hill (1855–1928), English sporting administrator, official and referee

=== Other ===
- George Hill (agronomist) (1938–2017), New Zealand agronomist
- George Hill (chef) (born 1942), Australian chef, educator, and author
- Sir George Francis Hill (1867–1948), director of the British Museum
- George Heywood Hill (1906–1986), British bookseller
- George Noel Hill (1893–1985), British architect
- George Washington Hill (1884–1946), American cigarette marketer
- George Watts Hill (1901–1993), American banker, hospital administrator and philanthropist

== Places ==
- George Hill, Anguilla, one of the fourteen districts of Anguilla
- George W. Hill Correctional Facility, a prison located in Delaware County, Pennsylvania, U.S.
- Dr. George E. Hill House, a historic house in Indianola on Merritt Island, Florida, U.S.
- George Hill Building, a historic structure in San Diego, California, U.S.

== See also ==
- George M. Hill Company, a publishing company based in Chicago, Illinois
- George Chatterton-Hill (1883–1947), Irish author of books on evolution and sociology
- George Hills (1816–1895), Canadian Anglican bishop
- George Hills (historian) (1918–2002), British journalist and historian
- George Edwin Hills (1905–1978), Canadian painter, contractor and politician in British Columbia
- St George's Hill, a private estate in Weybridge, Surrey, United Kingdom
- St. George's Hill, Saskatchewan, a hamlet in Canada
- Hill (surname)
