= George W. Hill =

George W. Hill may refer to:

- George Hill (director) (George William Hill, 1895–1934), American film director and cinematographer
- George William Hill (1838–1914), American astronomer and mathematician
- George W. Hill (pastor) (1916–2003), American Baptist pastor and peace activist
- George William Hill (sculptor) (1861–1934), Canadian sculptor
- George Washington Hill (1884–1946), president of American Tobacco Co.
- George Watts Hill (1901–1993), American banker, hospital administrator and philanthropist

== See also ==
- George W. Hill Correctional Facility, a jail and prison in Delaware County, Pennsylvania
- George Hill (disambiguation)
