= Calvary Baptist Church (Washington, D.C.) =

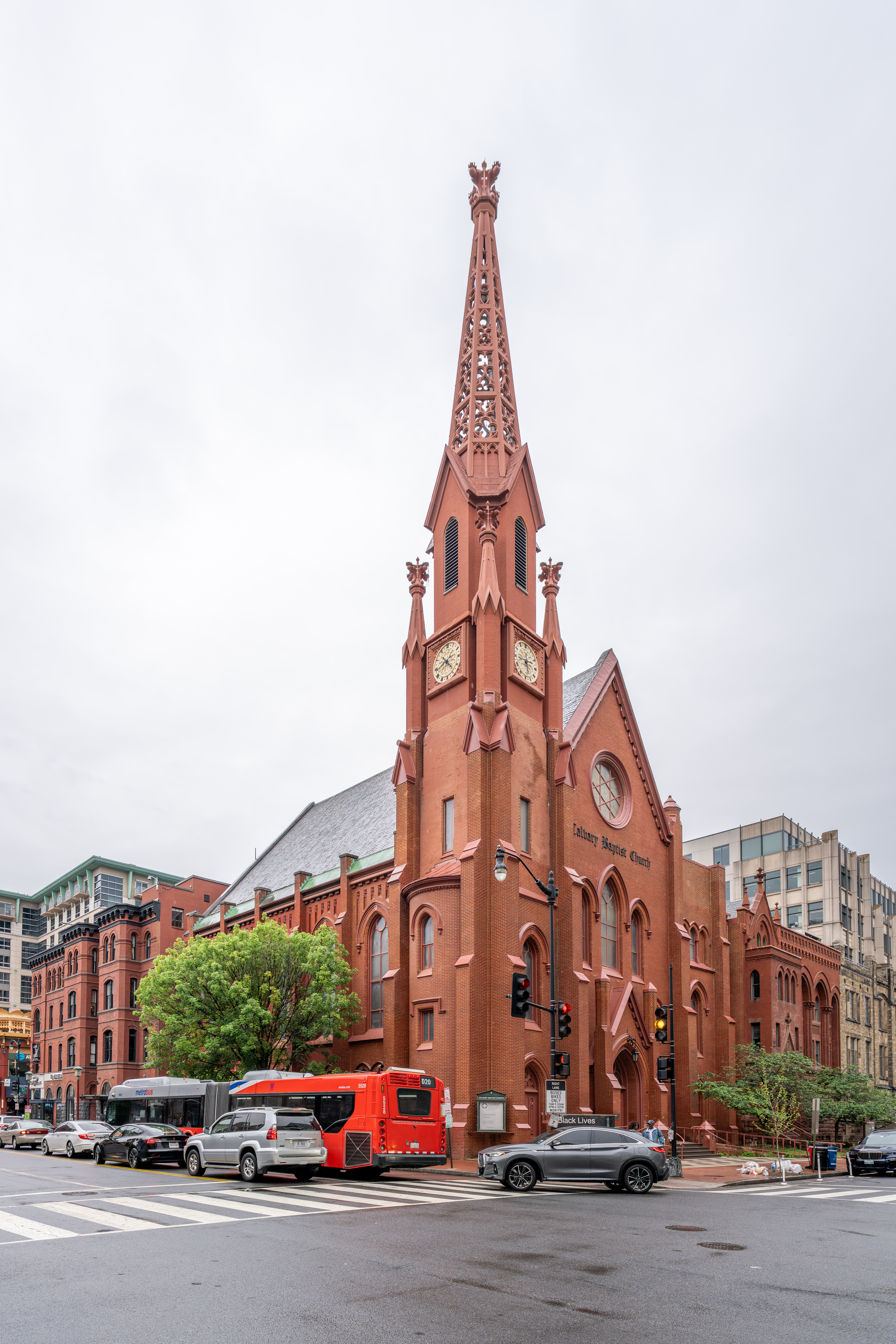
- Calvary Baptist Church in Washington, D.C.
- Calvary Baptist Church
- 38.899624°N 77.022716°W
- Location: 755 8th Street, NW, Washington, D.C., U.S.
- Country: United States
- Denomination: Baptist
- Website: www.calvarydc.org

History
- Former name: E Street Baptist
- Founded: 1862
- Founder: Amos Kendall
- Events: Founding of the Northern Baptists, now the American Baptist Churches USA

Architecture
- Architect: Adolf Cluss

Specifications
- Materials: red brick

Calvary Baptist Church is a progressive Baptist church located in the Chinatown neighborhood in Washington, D.C. affiliated with the American Baptist Churches USA, the Cooperative Baptist Fellowship, the Baptist Peace Fellowship of North America, the Alliance of Baptists, the District of Columbia Baptist Convention, and the Association of Welcoming and Affirming Baptists.

In July 2012, the church severed ties with the Southern Baptist Convention. Since 2017, Calvary's Senior Co-Pastors have been Rev. Sally Sarratt and Rev. Maria Swearingen.

== History ==
=== 19th century ===
Calvary Baptist Church was founded in 1862. The church's sanctuary building was designed by the German-born American architect Adolf Cluss, who also designed a number of other leading buildings in Washington, D.C.

Calvary is the founding church of the Northern Baptist Convention in 1907, the new structure of the Triennial Convention, now known as American Baptist Churches USA. Furthermore, Calvary is a leading church of the Baptist Sunday School movement at the turn of the century.

=== 20th century ===
Calvary Baptist Church is unique in Baptist life for having simultaneously had the presidents of the mainline Baptists, then minister Rev. Clarence Cranford, and that of the Southern Baptists, former Democratic member of Congress from Arkansas Brooks Hays, as members of the congregation.

In accordance with its vision statement, Calvary concentrated on its relationship with the Latino, and especially Salvadoran population by introducing bilingual services and partnering with a church in El Salvador, led by Rev. Edgar Palacios.

The church has been active in immigration reform efforts, along with the issue of marriage equality.

In 1983, Calvary founded the Calvary Women's Shelter, now Calvary Women's Services, the first women's homeless shelter in the Washington metropolitan area.

== Senior ministers ==
- Sally Sarratt and Maria Swearingen (married), 2017–current
- Amy Butler, 2003–2014
- Lynn Bergfalk, 1987–2000
- George W. Hill, 1971–1986
- Clarence Cranford, 1942–1971
- William S. Abernethy, 1921–1941
- Samuel Harrison Greene, 1880–1920
- Auguste Frank Mason, 1876–1879
- Joseph Parker, 1870–1875
- Thomas R. Howlett, 1863–1869
- Joseph Spencer Kennard, 1862

== Historic members ==
As a church in Washington, it has had a number of high-profile members including:

- Warren G. Harding, the 29th President of the United States
- Brooks Hays, former Democratic member of Congress from Arkansas and president of the Southern Baptist Convention
- George W. Hill, former minister at Calvary and a leading figure of the American Baptist Churches USA whose peace activism was influential in the founding of the United States Institute of Peace
- Charles Evans Hughes, first president of the Northern Baptist Convention, Governor of New York, United States Secretary of State, and Chief Justice of the United States
- Amos Kendall, the 8th United States Postmaster General; the first floor of Calvary's sanctuary building is named Kendall Hall in his honor.
- Fred Schwengel, former Republican member of Congress from Iowa and founding president of the United States Capitol Historical Society.
- William Shadrack Shallenberger, former Republican member of Congress from Pennsylvania appointed Second Assistant Postmaster General by President William McKinley Shallenberger Hall, Calvary's largest meeting room, is named after him. Shallenberger served as the superintendent of the Sunday School and taught the Vaughn Class.
