= DCBC =

DCBC may stand for:

- District of Columbia Baptist Convention
- Darwin College Boat Club, a rowing club of Darwin College, Cambridge, England
- Davao Christian Bible Channel, a TV station in Davao City, Philippines
- Downing College Boat Club, a rowing club of Downing College, Cambridge, England
