= Edgar Palacios =

American Baptist pastor & peace activist

Rev. Edgar Palacios
- Born: El Salvador
- Education: Latin American Social Sciences Institute
- Occupation: Pastor
- Employer: Calvary Baptist Church (Washington, D.C.)
- Spouse: Amparo

Edgar Palacios is an American Baptist pastor and peace activist during the Salvadoran Civil War.

== Peace Activism ==
Palacios was a Baptist pastor in El Salvador during the Salvadoran Civil War. He was pastor of Shalom Baptist Church in San Salvador. In this capacity, he helped found the National Council of Churches in El Salvador, of which he served as the Executive Director for three years and served as the President of the National Debate for Peace. In this capacity, he was involved in voter registration drives, for which he was fined by the government.

Palacios and his wife Amparo fled to Washington, DC in the United States under United Nations protection in 1989. There they founded the Permanent Commission of the National Debate for Peace, from which they continued their peace activism. Their activism took many forms, including testifying to the House Committee on Foreign Affairs on February 6, 1990.

According to Amnesty International, Palacios, among other church leaders, was targeted for "termination" by a death squad led by Roberto D'Aubuisson.

When the peace agreement was signed in 1992, the Palacios were present at the signing of the peace accords at the United Nations.

In 2012, the Baptist World Alliance awarded Palacios their Denton and Janice Lotz Human Rights Award.

On September 3, 2016, the Minister of Foreign Affairs of El Salvador, Hugo Martinez announced that Palacios had been appointed as Ambassador of El Salvador to the Government of Canada, replacing Professor Oscar Mauricio Duarte.

== Pastoral positions ==
Palacios now serves as an Associate Pastor of Christian Education at Calvary Baptist Church in Washington, DC. Calvary is now a sister church that supports Shalom, where he pastored in El Salvador. Calvary has an annual mission trip to El Salvador where, among other things, participants met with the Vice President of El Salvador, who recognized Calvary for college scholarships.

Palacios served on the board of the Baptist Peace Fellowship of North America.
