= June 29 =

June 29 this year in various calendars
- Monday, 29 June 2026
Akan	Nwonadwo
Armenian	14 Hrotich 1475
Aztec	Tepeilhuitl 10, 2 Tecpatl
Babylonian	13 Simanu, 2337 SE
Balinese pawukon	Luang, Pepet, Beteng, Menala, Paing, Aryang, Coma of Langkir, Yama, Jangur, Duka
Bengali	15 Asharh, BS 1433
Chinese	Yang Wood Dog・Heart Mansion; Fire Horse Year, Month 5, Day 15 (Xiazhi, 8 days until Xiaoshu)
Common Era	29 June 2026 CE
Coptic	22 Paoni, AM 1742
Egyptian	14 Athyr, 2775 NE
Ethiopian	22 Sanē, 2018 Amätä Məhrät
French Republican	Décade II, Primidi de Messidor de l'Année 234 de la République
Gregorian	29 June, AD 2026
Hebrew	14 Tamuz, AM 5786
Hindu	Mūla・Śukla; Solar: 15 Āṣāḍha, 1948 SE; Lunisolar: Pūrṇimā, Śukla pakṣa of Jyeṣṭha, 2083 VE; Rāudra・5127 KY・1,872,755
Icelandic	Mánudagur, 8 Sólmánuður 2026
Islamic	13 Muharram, AH 1448 (using tabular method)
ISO week date	2026-W27-1
Japanese	15 Satsuki, Reiwa 8 (Geshi, 8 days until Shōsho)
Julian	16 June, AD 2026 (AM 7534)
Julian day	2461221
Korean	15 Maldal, 4359 DE
Maya	13.0.13.12.18; 11 Tzec, 2 Etznab
Roman	ante diem XVI Kalendas Iulias, MMDCCLXXIX AUC
Solar Hijri	8 Tir, SH 1405
Tibetan	15 snron, me pho rta 2153 or 1772 or 1000

<<	June					>>
Su	Mo	Tu	We	Th	Fr	Sa
	1	2	3	4	5	6
7	8	9	10	11	12	13
14	15	16	17	18	19	20
21	22	23	24	25	26	27
28	29	30
2026

June 29 in recent years
2026 (Monday)
2025 (Sunday)
2024 (Saturday)
2023 (Thursday)
2022 (Wednesday)
2021 (Tuesday)
2020 (Monday)
2019 (Saturday)
2018 (Friday)
2017 (Thursday)

June 29 is the 180th day of the year (181st in leap years) in the Gregorian calendar; 185 days remain until the end of the year.

== Events ==
=== Pre-1600 ===
- 226 – Cao Rui succeeds his father as emperor of Wei.
- 626 – The Avars and Sassanids besiege Constantinople, held by Byzantine troops under Patrician Bonus.
- 1072 – Former Byzantine Emperor Romanos IV Diogenes is blinded on command of caesar John Doukas.
- 1149 – Raymond of Poitiers is defeated and killed at the Battle of Inab by Nur ad-Din Zangi.
- 1170 – A major earthquake hits Syria, badly damaging towns such as Hama and Shaizar and structures such as the Krak des Chevaliers and the cathedral of St. Peter in Antioch.
- 1194 – Sverre is crowned King of Norway, leading to his excommunication by the Catholic Church and civil war.
- 1444 – Skanderbeg defeats an Ottoman invasion force at Torvioll.
- 1457 – The Dutch city of Dordrecht is devastated by fire.
- 1534 – Jacques Cartier is the first European to reach Prince Edward Island.

=== 1601–1900 ===
- 1613 – The Globe Theatre in London, built by William Shakespeare's playing company, the Lord Chamberlain's Men, burns to the ground.
- 1620 – English crown bans tobacco growing in England, giving the Virginia Company a monopoly in exchange for tax of one shilling per pound.
- 1644 – Charles I of England defeats a Parliamentarian detachment at the Battle of Cropredy Bridge.
- 1659 – At the Battle of Konotop the Ukrainian armies of Ivan Vyhovsky defeat the Russians led by Prince Trubetskoy.
- 1764 – One of the strongest tornadoes in history strikes Woldegk, Germany, killing one person while leveling numerous mansions with winds estimated greater than 300 miles per hour (480 km/h).
- 1786 – Alexander Macdonell and over five hundred Roman Catholic highlanders leave Scotland to settle in Glengarry County, Ontario.
- 1807 – Russo-Turkish War: Admiral Dmitry Senyavin destroys the Ottoman fleet in the Battle of Athos.
- 1850 – Autocephaly officially granted by the Ecumenical Patriarchate of Constantinople to the Church of Greece.
- 1864 – At least 99 people, mostly German and Polish immigrants, are killed in Canada's worst railway disaster after a train fails to stop for an open drawbridge and plunges into the Rivière Richelieu near St-Hilaire, Quebec.
- 1874 – Greek politician Charilaos Trikoupis publishes a manifesto in the Athens daily Kairoi entitled "Who's to Blame?" leveling complaints against King George. Trikoupis is elected Prime Minister of Greece the next year.
- 1880 – France annexes Tahiti, renaming the independent Kingdom of Tahiti as "Etablissements de français de l'Océanie".
- 1881 – In Sudan, Muhammad Ahmad declares himself to be the Mahdi, the messianic redeemer of Islam.
- 1888 – George Edward Gouraud records Handel's Israel in Egypt onto a phonograph cylinder, thought for many years to be the oldest known recording of music.
- 1889 – Hyde Park and several other Illinois townships vote to be annexed by Chicago, forming the largest United States city in area and second largest in population at the time.

=== 1901–present ===
- 1913 – The Bulgarian army launches attacks against Serbian positions, triggering the Second Balkan War.
- 1915 – The North Saskatchewan River flood of 1915 is the worst flood in Edmonton history.
- 1916 – British diplomat turned Irish nationalist Roger Casement is sentenced to death for his part in the Easter Rising.
- 1922 – France grants "one square kilometer" at Vimy Ridge "freely, and for all time, to the Government of Canada, the free use of the land exempt from all taxes".
- 1927 – The Bird of Paradise, a U.S. Army Air Corps Fokker tri-motor, completes the first transpacific flight, from the mainland United States to Hawaii.
- 1945 – The Soviet Union annexes the Czechoslovak province of Carpathian Ruthenia.
- 1950 – Korean War: U.S. President Harry S. Truman authorizes a sea blockade of Korea.
- 1952 – The first Miss Universe pageant is held. Armi Kuusela from Finland wins the title of Miss Universe 1952.
- 1956 – The Federal Aid Highway Act of 1956 is signed by U.S. President Dwight D. Eisenhower, officially creating the United States Interstate Highway System.
- 1971 – Prior to re-entry (following a record-setting stay aboard the Soviet Union's Salyut 1 space station), the crew capsule of the Soyuz 11 spacecraft depressurizes, killing the three cosmonauts on board. Georgy Dobrovolsky, Vladislav Volkov and Viktor Patsayev are the first humans to die in space.
- 1972 – The United States Supreme Court rules in the case Furman v. Georgia that arbitrary and inconsistent imposition of the death penalty violates the Eighth and Fourteenth Amendments and constitutes cruel and unusual punishment.
- 1972 – A Convair CV-580 and De Havilland Canada DHC-6 Twin Otter collide above Lake Winnebago near Appleton, Wisconsin, killing 13.
- 1974 – Vice President Isabel Perón assumes powers and duties as Acting President of Argentina, while her husband President Juan Perón is terminally ill.
- 1974 – Mikhail Baryshnikov defects from the Soviet Union to Canada while on tour with the Kirov Ballet.
- 1975 – Pope Paul VI ordains some 350 priests in St. Peter's Square in the largest ordination in history
- 1976 – The Seychelles become independent from the United Kingdom.
- 1976 – The Conference of Communist and Workers Parties of Europe convenes in East Berlin.
- 1986 – The Argentina national football team wins the FIFA World Cup held in Mexico after defeating the West Germany national football team by a score of 3–2 in the final at the Estadio Azteca.
- 1987 – Vincent van Gogh's painting, the Le Pont de Trinquetaille, is bought for $20.4 million at an auction in London, England.
- 1995 – Space Shuttle program: STS-71 Mission (Atlantis) docks with the Russian space station Mir for the first time.
- 1995 – The Sampoong Department Store collapses in the Seocho District of Seoul, South Korea, killing 502 and injuring 937.
- 2002 – Naval clashes between South Korea and North Korea lead to the death of six South Korean sailors and sinking of a North Korean vessel.
- 2006 – Hamdan v. Rumsfeld: The U.S. Supreme Court rules that President George W. Bush's plan to try Guantanamo Bay detainees in military tribunals violates U.S. and international law.
- 2007 – Apple Inc. releases its first mobile phone, the iPhone.
- 2012 – A derecho sweeps across the eastern United States, leaving at least 22 people dead and millions without power.
- 2014 – The Islamic State of Iraq and the Levant self-declares its caliphate in Syria and northern Iraq.

== Births ==
=== Pre-1600 ===
- 1136 – Petronilla of Aragon (died 1173)
- 1326 – Murad I, Ottoman Sultan (died 1389)
- 1398 – John II of Aragon and Navarre (died 1479)
- 1443 – Anthony Browne, English knight (died 1506)
- 1482 – Maria of Aragon, Queen of Portugal (died 1517)
- 1488 – Pedro Pacheco de Villena, Catholic cardinal (died 1560)
- 1517 – Rembert Dodoens, Flemish physician and botanist (died 1585)
- 1525 – Peter Agricola, German humanist, theologian, diplomat and statesman (died 1585)
- 1528 – Julius, Duke of Brunswick-Lüneburg (died 1589)
- 1543 – Christine of Hesse, Duchess consort of Holstein-Gottorp (died 1604)
- 1596 – Emperor Go-Mizunoo of Japan (died 1680)

=== 1601–1900 ===
- 1621 – Willem van der Zaan, Dutch Admiral (died 1669)
- 1686 – Pietro Paolo Troisi, Maltese artist (died 1743)
- 1746 – Joachim Heinrich Campe, German linguist, author, and educator (died 1818)
- 1768 – Vincenzo Dimech, Maltese sculptor (died 1831)
- 1787 – Lavinia Stoddard, American poet, school founder (died 1820)
- 1793 – Josef Ressel, Czech-Austrian inventor, invented the propeller (died 1857)
- 1798 – Willibald Alexis, German author and poet (died 1871)
- 1798 – Giacomo Leopardi, Italian poet and philosopher (died 1837)
- 1801 – Frédéric Bastiat, French economist and theorist (died 1850)
- 1803 – John Newton Brown, American minister and author (died 1868)
- 1818 – Angelo Secchi, Italian astronomer and academic (died 1878)
- 1819 – Thomas Dunn English, American poet, playwright, and politician (died 1902)
- 1833 – Peter Waage, Norwegian chemist and academic (died 1900)
- 1835 – Celia Thaxter, American poet and story writer (died 1894)
- 1844 – Peter I of Serbia (died 1921)
- 1849 – Pedro Montt, Chilean lawyer and politician, 15th President of Chile (died 1910)
- 1849 – Sergei Witte, Russian politician, 1st Chairmen of Council of Ministers of the Russian Empire (died 1915)
- 1849 – John Hunn, American businessman and politician, 51st Governor of Delaware (died 1926)
- 1858 – George Washington Goethals, American general and engineer, co-designed the Panama Canal (died 1928)
- 1858 – Julia Lathrop, American activist and politician (died 1932)
- 1861 – William James Mayo, American physician and surgeon, co-founded the Mayo Clinic (died 1939)
- 1863 – Wilbert Robinson, American baseball player, coach, and manager (died 1934)
- 1866 – Bartholomeus Roodenburch, Dutch swimmer (died 1939)
- 1868 – George Ellery Hale, American astronomer and journalist (died 1938)
- 1870 – Joseph Carl Breil, American tenor, composer, and director (died 1926)
- 1873 – Leo Frobenius, German ethnologist and archaeologist (died 1938)
- 1879 – Benedetto Aloisi Masella, Italian cardinal (died 1970)
- 1880 – Ludwig Beck, German general (died 1944)
- 1881 – Harry Frazee, American director, producer, and agent (died 1929)
- 1881 – Curt Sachs, German-American composer and musicologist (died 1959)
- 1882 – Henry Hawtrey, English runner (died 1961)
- 1882 – Franz Seldte, German captain and politician, Reich Minister for Labour (died 1947)
- 1885 – Izidor Kürschner, Hungarian football player and coach (died 1941)
- 1886 – Robert Schuman, Luxembourgian-French lawyer and politician, Prime Minister of France (died 1963)
- 1888 – Squizzy Taylor, Australian gangster (died 1927)
- 1889 – Willie Macfarlane, Scottish-American golfer (died 1961)
- 1890 – Robert Laurent, American sculptor and academic (died 1970)
- 1890 – Hendrikje van Andel-Schipper, Dutch supercentenarian (died 2005)
- 1893 – Prasanta Chandra Mahalanobis, Indian economist and statistician (died 1972)
- 1893 – Aarre Merikanto, Finnish composer and educator (died 1958)
- 1897 – Fulgence Charpentier, Canadian journalist and publisher (died 2001)
- 1898 – Yvonne Lefébure, French pianist and educator (died 1986)
- 1900 – Antoine de Saint-Exupéry, French poet and pilot (died 1944)

=== 1901–present ===
- 1901 – Nelson Eddy, American singer and actor (died 1967)
- 1903 – Alan Blumlein, English engineer, developed the H2S radar (died 1942)
- 1904 – Witold Hurewicz, Polish mathematician (died 1956)
- 1906 – Ivan Chernyakhovsky, Ukrainian general (died 1945)
- 1906 – Heinz Harmel, German general (died 2000)
- 1908 – Leroy Anderson, American composer and conductor (died 1975)
- 1908 – Erik Lundqvist, Swedish javelin thrower (died 1963)
- 1909 – Harold Edward Dahl, American pilot and mercenary (died 1956)
- 1910 – Frank Loesser, American composer and conductor (died 1969)
- 1910 – Burgess Whitehead, American baseball player (died 1993)
- 1911 – Prince Bernhard of Lippe-Biesterfeld (died 2004)
- 1911 – Katherine DeMille, Canadian-American actress (died 1995)
- 1911 – Bernard Herrmann, American composer and conductor (died 1975)
- 1912 – José Pablo Moncayo, Mexican pianist, composer, and conductor (died 1958)
- 1912 – Émile Peynaud, French oenologist and academic (died 2004)
- 1912 – John Toland, American historian and author (died 2004)
- 1913 – Earle Meadows, American pole vaulter (died 1992)
- 1914 – Rafael Kubelík, Czech-American conductor and composer (died 1996)
- 1914 – Christos Papakyriakopoulos, Greek-American mathematician and academic (died 1976)
- 1916 – Ruth Warrick, American actress and activist (died 2005)
- 1917 – Ling Yun, Chinese politician (died 2018)
- 1918 – Heini Lohrer, Swiss ice hockey player (died 2011)
- 1918 – Gene La Rocque, U.S admiral (died 2016)
- 1918 – Francis W. Nye, United States Air Force major general (died 2019)
- 1919 – Ernesto Corripio y Ahumada, Mexican cardinal (died 2008)
- 1919 – Walter Babington Thomas, Commander of British Far East Land Forces (died 2017)
- 1919 – Juan Blanco, Cuban composer (died 2008)
- 1919 – Slim Pickens, American actor and rodeo performer (died 1983)
- 1919 – Lloyd Richards, Canadian-American theatre director, actor, and dean (died 2006)
- 1920 – César Rodríguez Álvarez, Spanish footballer and manager (died 1995)
- 1920 – Ray Harryhausen, American animator and producer (died 2013)
- 1920 – Nicole Russell, Duchess of Bedford (died 2012)
- 1920 – David Snellgrove, British tibetologist (died 2016)
- 1921 – Frédéric Dard, French author and screenwriter (died 2000)
- 1921 – Jean Kent, English actress (died 2013)
- 1921 – Reinhard Mohn, German businessman (died 2009)
- 1921 – Harry Schell, French-American race car driver (died 1960)
- 1922 – Ralph Burns, American songwriter, bandleader, composer, conductor, arranger and pianist (died 2001)
- 1922 – Vasko Popa, Serbian poet and academic (died 1991)
- 1922 – John William Vessey, Jr., American general (died 2016)
- 1923 – Chou Wen-chung, Chinese-American composer and educator (died 2019)
- 1924 – Ezra Laderman, American composer and educator (died 2015)
- 1924 – Roy Walford, American pathologist and gerontologist (died 2004)
- 1924 – Philip H. Hoff, American politician (died 2018)
- 1925 – Francis S. Currey, American World War II Medal of Honor recipient (died 2019)
- 1925 – Giorgio Napolitano, Italian journalist and politician, 11th President of Italy (died 2023)
- 1925 – Chan Parker, American dancer and author (died 1999)
- 1925 – Jackie Lynn Taylor, American actress (died 2014)
- 1925 – Cara Williams, American actress (died 2021)
- 1926 – Jaber Al-Ahmad Al-Sabah, Kuwaiti ruler, 3rd Emir of Kuwait (died 2006)
- 1926 – Julius W. Becton, Jr., U.S lieutenant general (died 2023)
- 1926 – Roger Stuart Bacon, Nova Scotia politician (died 2021)
- 1926 – Bobby Morgan, American professional baseball player (died 2023)
- 1927 – Pierre Perrault, Canadian director and screenwriter (died 1999)
- 1927 – Marie Thérèse Killens, Canadian politician
- 1928 – Ian Bannen, Scottish actor (died 1999)
- 1928 – Jean-Louis Pesch, French author and illustrator (died 2023)
- 1928 – Radius Prawiro, Indonesian economist and politician (died 2005)
- 1929 – Pat Crawford Brown, American actress (died 2019)
- 1929 – Pete George, American weightlifter (died 2021)
- 1929 – Oriana Fallaci, Italian journalist and author (died 2006)
- 1930 – Ernst Albrecht, German economist and politician, 6th Prime Minister of Lower Saxony (died 2014)
- 1930 – Robert Evans, American actor and producer (died 2019)
- 1930 – Viola Léger, American-Canadian actress and politician (died 2023)
- 1930 – Sławomir Mrożek, Polish-French author and playwright (died 2013)
- 1931 – Sevim Burak, Turkish author (died 1983)
- 1932 – Brian Hutton, Baron Hutton, British jurist; Lord Chief Justice of Northern Ireland (died 2020)
- 1933 – Bob Shaw, American baseball player and manager (died 2010)
- 1933 – John Bradshaw, American theologian and author (died 2016)
- 1934 – Corey Allen, American actor, director, and producer (died 2010)
- 1935 – Vassilis C. Constantakopoulos, Greek captain and businessman (died 2011)
- 1935 – Katsuya Nomura, Japanese baseball player and manager (died 2020)
- 1936 – Harmon Killebrew, American baseball player (died 2011)
- 1936 – Eddie Mabo, Australian land rights activist (died 1992)
- 1939 – Alan Connolly, Australian cricketer
- 1939 – Amarildo Tavares da Silveira, Brazilian footballer and coach
- 1940 – Vyacheslav Artyomov, Russian composer
- 1940 – John Dawes, Welsh rugby player and coach (died 2021)
- 1941 – John Boccabella, American baseball player
- 1941 – Stokely Carmichael, Trinidadian-American activist (died 1998)
- 1942 – Charlotte Bingham, English author and screenwriter (died 2025)
- 1942 – Mike Willesee, Australian journalist and producer (died 2019)
- 1943 – Little Eva, American singer (died 2003)
- 1943 – Louis Nicollin, French entrepreneur and chairman of Montpellier HSC (died 2017)
- 1944 – Gary Busey, American actor
- 1944 – Claude Humphrey, American football player (died 2021)
- 1944 – Andreu Mas-Colell, Spanish economist, academic, and politician
- 1944 – Seán Patrick O'Malley, American cardinal
- 1945 – Chandrika Kumaratunga, Sri Lankan journalist and politician, 5th President of Sri Lanka
- 1946 – Ernesto Pérez Balladares, Panamanian politician, 33rd President of Panama
- 1946 – Egon von Fürstenberg, Swiss fashion designer (died 2004)
- 1947 – Richard Lewis, American actor and screenwriter (died 2024)
- 1948 – Sean Bergin, South African-Dutch saxophonist and flute player (died 2012)
- 1948 – Fred Grandy, American actor and politician
- 1948 – Ian Paice, English drummer, songwriter, and producer
- 1948 – Usha Prashar, Baroness Prashar, Kenyan-English politician
- 1949 – Dan Dierdorf, American football player and sportscaster
- 1949 – Joan Clos, Spanish anesthesiologist and politician, 116th Mayor of Barcelona
- 1949 – Ann Veneman, American lawyer and politician, 27th United States Secretary of Agriculture
- 1950 – Bobby London, American illustrator
- 1950 – Don Moen, American singer and songwriter
- 1950 – Michael Whelan, American artist
- 1951 – Craig Sager, American sportscaster (died 2016)
- 1953 – Don Dokken, American singer-songwriter and guitarist
- 1953 – Colin Hay, Scottish-Australian singer and guitarist
- 1954 – Rick Honeycutt, American baseball player and coach
- 1954 – Léo Júnior, Brazilian footballer, coach, and manager
- 1955 – Charles J. Precourt, American colonel, pilot, and astronaut
- 1956 – Nick Fry, English economist and businessman
- 1956 – David Burroughs Mattingly, American illustrator and painter
- 1956 – Pedro Guerrero, Dominican baseball player and manager
- 1956 – Pedro Santana Lopes, Portuguese lawyer and politician, 118th Prime Minister of Portugal
- 1956 – Pyotr Vasilevsky, Belarusian footballer and manager (died 2012)
- 1957 – Gurbanguly Berdimuhamedow, Turkmen dentist and politician, 2nd President of Turkmenistan
- 1957 – María Conchita Alonso, Cuban-Venezuelan singer and actress
- 1957 – Robert Forster, Australian singer-songwriter and guitarist
- 1957 – Michael Nutter, American politician, 98th Mayor of Philadelphia
- 1957 – Terry Wyatt, English physicist and academic
- 1958 – Dieter Althaus, German politician
- 1958 – Rosa Mota, Portuguese runner
- 1961 – Sharon Lawrence, American actress, singer, and dancer
- 1962 – Amanda Donohoe, English actress
- 1962 – Joan Laporta, Spanish businessman and politician
- 1962 – George D. Zamka, American colonel, pilot, and astronaut
- 1963 – Anne-Sophie Mutter, German violinist
- 1963 – Judith Hoag, American actress and educator
- 1964 – Stedman Pearson, English singer-songwriter and dancer (died 2025)
- 1964 – Kathleen Wilhoite, American actress and musician
- 1965 – Tripp Eisen, American guitarist
- 1965 – Paul Jarvis, English cricketer
- 1965 – Daniel Larson, American politician
- 1966 – Yoko Kamio, Japanese author and comic artist
- 1967 – Jeff Burton, American race car driver
- 1967 – Melora Hardin, American actress and singer
- 1967 – Seamus McGarvey, Northern Irish cinematographer
- 1968 – Brian d'Arcy James, American actor and musician
- 1968 – Theoren Fleury, Canadian ice hockey player
- 1969 – Claude Béchard, Canadian politician (died 2010)
- 1969 – Pavlos Dermitzakis, Greek footballer and manager
- 1969 – Tōru Hashimoto, Japanese lawyer and politician
- 1970 – Edda Mutter, German alpine skier
- 1970 – Melanie Paschke, German sprinter
- 1970 – Emily Skinner, American actress and singer
- 1971 – Matthew Good, Canadian singer-songwriter and guitarist
- 1972 – DJ Shadow, American DJ and record producer
- 1973 – Sakis Tolis, Greek singer and guitarist
- 1973 – Lance Barber, American actor
- 1973 – George Hincapie, American cyclist
- 1976 – Daniel Carlsson, Swedish race car driver
- 1976 – Bret McKenzie, New Zealand comedian, actor, musician, songwriter, and producer
- 1977 – Sotiris Liberopoulos, Greek footballer
- 1977 – Zuleikha Robinson, English actress
- 1978 – Sam Farrar, American musician
- 1978 – Luke Kirby, Canadian actor
- 1978 – Nicole Scherzinger, American singer-songwriter, dancer, and actress
- 1979 – Matthew Bode, Australian footballer
- 1979 – Andy O'Brien, English footballer
- 1979 – Marleen Veldhuis, Dutch swimmer
- 1980 – Katherine Jenkins, Welsh soprano and actress
- 1981 – Luke Branighan, Australian rugby league player
- 1981 – Joe Johnson, American basketball player
- 1981 – Nicolás Vuyovich, Argentine race car driver (died 2005)
- 1981 – Shmuly Yanklowitz, American rabbi, author, and educator
- 1982 – Colin Jost, American comedian
- 1982 – Dusty Hughes, American baseball player
- 1982 – Lily Rabe, American actress
- 1982 – O. J. Hogans, American sprinter
- 1983 – Aundrea Fimbres, American singer-songwriter and dancer
- 1983 – Jeremy Powers, American cyclist
- 1984 – Aleksandr Shustov, Russian high jumper
- 1985 – Quintin Demps, American football player
- 1986 – José Manuel Jurado, Spanish footballer
- 1986 – Edward Maya, Romanian singer-songwriter and producer
- 1988 – Éver Banega, Argentine footballer
- 1990 – Kim Little, Scottish footballer
- 1990 – Yann M'Vila, French footballer
- 1991 – Suk Hyun-jun, South Korean footballer
- 1991 – Tajja Isen, Canadian actress and writer
- 1991 – Kawhi Leonard, American basketball player
- 1991 – Addison Timlin, American actress
- 1993 – Harrison Gilbertson, Australian actor
- 1993 – Oliver Tree, American singer-songwriter (died 2026)
- 1994 – Camila Mendes, American actress and model
- 1994 – Leandro Paredes, Argentine footballer
- 1996 – Joseph Manu, New Zealand rugby league player
- 1998 – Gjon's Tears, Swiss singer-songwriter
- 1998 – Michael Porter Jr., American basketball player
- 2001 – Julian Champagnie, American basketball player
- 2001 – Gunnar Henderson, American baseball player
- 2001 – Aaron Schoupp, Australian rugby league player
- 2002 – Matt Rempe, Canadian ice hockey player
- 2003 – Jude Bellingham, English footballer
- 2006 – Sam Lavagnino, American child voice actor
- 2007 – Casey Phair, South Korean footballer

== Deaths ==
=== Pre-1600 ===
- 226 – Cao Pi, Chinese emperor (born 187)
- 884 – Yang Shili, general of the Tang Dynasty
- 976 – Gero, archbishop of Cologne
- 1059 – Bernard II, Duke of Saxony (born 995)
- 1149 – Raymond of Poitiers, Prince of Antioch (born 1115)
- 1153 – Óláfr Guðrøðarson, King of the Isles
- 1252 – Abel, King of Denmark (born 1218)
- 1293 – Henry of Ghent, philosopher (born c.1217)
- 1315 – Ramon Llull, Spanish philosopher (born 1235)
- 1344 – Joan of Savoy, duchess consort of Brittany, throne claimant of Savoy (born 1310)
- 1374 – Jan Milíč of Kroměříž, Czech priest and reformer
- 1432 – Janus of Cyprus (born 1375)
- 1509 – Margaret Beaufort, Countess of Richmond and Derby (born 1443)
- 1520 – Moctezuma II, Aztec ruler (born 1466)
- 1575 – Baba Nobuharu, Japanese samurai (born 1515)
- 1594 – Niels Kaas, Danish politician, Chancellor of Denmark (born 1535)

=== 1601–1900 ===
- 1626 – Scipione Cobelluzzi, Italian cardinal and archivist (born 1564)
- 1646 – Laughlin Ó Cellaigh, Gaelic-Irish Lord
- 1725 – Arai Hakuseki, Japanese philosopher, academic, and politician (born 1657)
- 1729 – Edward Taylor, American-English poet, pastor, and physician (born circa 1642)
- 1744 – André Campra, French composer and conductor (born 1660)
- 1764 – Ralph Allen, English businessman and philanthropist (born 1693)
- 1779 – Anton Raphael Mengs, German painter (born 1728)
- 1831 – Heinrich Friedrich Karl vom und zum Stein, Prussian minister and politician (born 1757)
- 1840 – Lucien Bonaparte, French prince (born 1775)
- 1852 – Henry Clay, American lawyer and politician, 9th United States Secretary of State (born 1777)
- 1853 – Adrien-Henri de Jussieu, French botanist and academic (born 1797)
- 1855 – John Gorrie, American physician and humanitarian (born 1803)
- 1860 – Thomas Addison, English physician and endocrinologist (born 1793)
- 1861 – Elizabeth Barrett Browning, English poet and translator (born 1806)
- 1873 – Michael Madhusudan Dutt, Indian poet and playwright (born 1824)
- 1875 – Ferdinand I of Austria (born 1793)
- 1895 – Thomas Henry Huxley, English biologist (born 1825)
- 1900 – Ivan Mikheevich Pervushin, Russian mathematician and academic (born 1827)

=== 1901–present ===
- 1907 – Konstantinos Volanakis, Greek painter and academic (born 1837)
- 1919 – José Gregorio Hernández Venezuelan physician and educator (born 1864)
- 1931 – Nérée Beauchemin, Canadian poet and physician (born 1850)
- 1933 – Roscoe Arbuckle, American actor, director, and screenwriter (born 1887)
- 1935 – Jack O'Neill, Irish-American baseball player and manager (born 1873)
- 1936 – János Szlepecz, Slovene priest and missionary (born 1872)
- 1940 – Paul Klee, Swiss painter and illustrator (born 1879)
- 1941 – Ignacy Jan Paderewski, Polish pianist, composer, and politician, 2nd Prime Minister of Poland (born 1860)
- 1942 – Paul Troje, German politician, Mayor of Marburg (born 1864)
- 1949 – Themistoklis Sofoulis, Greek politician, 115th Prime Minister of Greece (born 1860)
- 1955 – Max Pechstein, German painter and academic (born 1881)
- 1960 – Frank Patrick, Canadian ice hockey player and coach (born 1885)
- 1962 – Charles Lyon Chandler, American historian (born 1883)
- 1964 – Eric Dolphy, American saxophonist, composer, and bandleader (born 1928)
- 1967 – Primo Carnera, Italian boxer and actor (born 1906)
- 1967 – Jayne Mansfield, American actress (born 1933)
- 1969 – Moise Tshombe, Congolese accountant and politician, Prime Minister of the Democratic Republic of the Congo (born 1919)
- 1971 – Nestor Mesta Chayres, Mexican operatic tenor and bolero vocalist (born 1908)
- 1975 – Tim Buckley, American singer-songwriter and guitarist (born 1947)
- 1978 – Bob Crane, American actor (born 1928)
- 1979 – Lowell George, American singer-songwriter, guitarist, and producer (born 1945)
- 1980 – Jorge Basadre, Peruvian historian (born 1903)
- 1981 – Russell Drysdale, English-Australian painter (born 1912)
- 1982 – Pierre Balmain, French fashion designer, founded Balmain (born 1914)
- 1982 – Henry King, American actor, director, producer, and screenwriter (born 1886)
- 1986 – Frank Wise, Australian politician, 16th Premier of Western Australia (born 1897)
- 1990 – Irving Wallace, American author and screenwriter (born 1916)
- 1992 – Mohamed Boudiaf, Algerian soldier and politician, President of Algeria (born 1919)
- 1993 – Héctor Lavoe, Puerto Rican-American singer-songwriter (born 1946)
- 1994 – Kurt Eichhorn, German conductor and educator (born 1908)
- 1995 – Lana Turner, American actress (born 1921)
- 1997 – William Hickey, American actor (born 1927)
- 1997 – Marjorie Linklater, Scottish campaigner for the arts and environment of Orkney (born 1909)
- 1998 – Horst Jankowski, German pianist and composer (born 1936)
- 1999 – Karekin I, Syrian-Armenian patriarch (born 1950)
- 1999 – Allan Carr, American screenwriter and producer (born 1937)
- 2000 – Vittorio Gassman, Italian actor and director (born 1922)
- 2000 – Jane Birdwood, Baroness Birdwood, Canadian-English publisher and politician (born 1913)
- 2002 – Rosemary Clooney, American singer and actress (born 1928)
- 2003 – Katharine Hepburn, American actress (born 1907)
- 2004 – Bernard Babior, American physician and biochemist (born 1935)
- 2004 – Alvin Hamilton, Canadian lieutenant and politician, 18th Canadian Minister of Agriculture (born 1912)
- 2006 – Fabián Bielinsky, Argentine director and screenwriter (born 1959)
- 2006 – Lloyd Richards, Canadian-American theatre director, actor, and dean (born 1919)
- 2006 – Randy Walker, American football player and coach (born 1954)
- 2007 – Fred Saberhagen, American soldier and author (born 1930)
- 2007 – Joel Siegel, American journalist and critic (born 1943)
- 2009 – Joe Bowman, American, target shooter and boot-maker (born 1925)
- 2011 – K. D. Sethna, Indian poet, scholar, writer, philosopher, and cultural critic (born 1904)
- 2012 – Yong Nyuk Lin, Singaporean politician, Singaporean Minister of Health (born 1918)
- 2012 – Vincent Ostrom, American political scientist and academic (born 1919)
- 2012 – Juan Reccius, Chilean triple jumper (born 1911)
- 2012 – Floyd Temple, American baseball player, coach, and manager (born 1926)
- 2013 – Peter Fitzgerald, Irish footballer and manager (born 1937)
- 2013 – Jack Gotta, American-Canadian football player, coach, and manager (born 1929)
- 2013 – Margherita Hack, Italian astrophysicist and author (born 1922)
- 2013 – Gilma Jiménez, Colombian politician (born 1956)
- 2014 – Damian D'Oliveira, South African cricketer (born 1960)
- 2014 – Dermot Healy, Irish author, poet, and playwright (born 1947)
- 2015 – Hisham Barakat, Egyptian lawyer and judge (born 1950)
- 2015 – Josef Masopust, Czech footballer and coach (born 1931)
- 2015 – Charles Pasqua, French businessman and politician, French Minister of the Interior (born 1927)
- 2016 – Jan Hettema, Springbok cyclist and five times South African National Rally Champion (born 1933)
- 2017 – Louis Nicollin, French entrepreneur and chairman of Montpellier HSC from 1974 to his death (born 1943)
- 2017 – Dave Semenko, Canadian ice hockey player (born 1957)
- 2018 – Steve Ditko, American comic writer and illustrator (born 1927)
- 2019 – Florijana Ismaili, Swiss footballer (born 1995)
- 2020 – Carl Reiner, American actor, director, producer, and screenwriter (born 1922)
- 2020 – Stepa J. Groggs, American rap artist (born 1988)
- 2020 – Hachalu Hundessa, Ethiopian singer, songwriter (born 1986)
- 2021 – Donald Rumsfeld, American captain and politician, 13th United States Secretary of Defense (born 1932)
- 2022 – Hershel W. Williams, American Marine Corps warrant officer, last living Medal of Honor recipient from World War II (born 1923)
- 2023 – Alan Arkin, American actor (born 1934)
- 2024 – Princess Lalla Latifa, Princess Dowager of Morocco (born 1946)
- 2025 – Sandy Gall, Malaysian-Scottish journalist and author (born 1927)

== Holidays and observances ==
- Christian feast day:
  - Cassius of Narni
  - Hemma of Gurk
  - Mary, mother of John Mark
  - Feast of Saints Peter and Paul (Western Christianity), and its related observances:
    - Haro Wine Festival (Haro, La Rioja)
    - l-Imnarja (Malta)
  - June 29 (Eastern Orthodox liturgics)
- Engineer's Day (Ecuador)
- Independence Day (Seychelles), celebrates the independence of Seychelles from the United Kingdom in 1976.
- Veterans' Day (Netherlands)
- National Statistics Day (India)
