= Amy Butler (minister) =

American Christian minister

Dr. Amy K. Butler
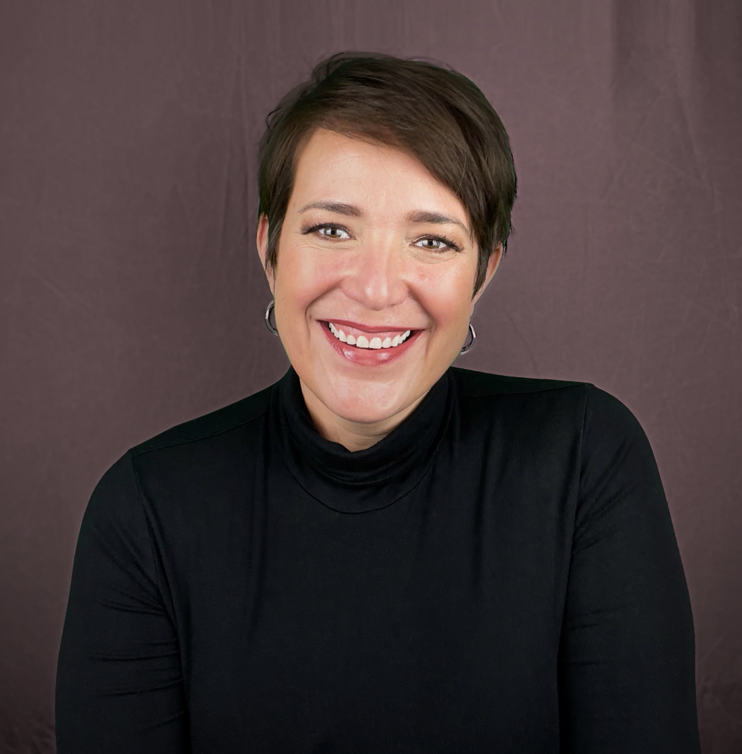
- Education: Baylor University; International Baptist Theological Seminary; Wesley Theological Seminary
- Occupation: Minister
- Years active: 1997–present
- Organization(s): Founder, Invested Faith

Amy Butler is an American ordained Baptist minister. Butler was the first woman to serve as senior elder at the Riverside Church in New York City and at Calvary Baptist Church in Washington D.C. She also served as the interim senior minister of the National City Christian Church in Washington D.C.

== Education and career ==
Amy Butler attended Baylor University, where she earned a BA in 1991 and a MA in 1996. Butler also holds a Bachelor of Theology from the International Baptist Theological Seminary (IBTS) in Ruschlikon, Switzerland, and a Doctor of Ministry degree from Wesley Theological Seminary.

Following her graduation from IBTS, Butler led a homeless shelter in New Orleans, Louisiana through the Cooperative Baptist Fellowship and served on the staff of Lindy's Place, a transitional housing facility that provides support for women coming out of homelessness. Butler then became Associate Pastor of Membership and Mission at St. Charles Avenue Baptist Church, also in New Orleans.

In 2003, Butler served as senior minister of Calvary Baptist Church in Washington, DC, founding church of the Northern Baptist Convention, now American Baptist Churches USA. As Calvary's first female senior minister, Butler helped Calvary more than triple in membership. Her work at Calvary was featured in Paul Nixon's book We Refused to Lead a Dying Church!: Churches That Came Back Against All Odds. She held this position until 2014, at which time she accepted the senior minister position at the Riverside Church.

== Riverside Church ==
Butler was elected to the senior minister position at Riverside on June 8, 2014. In July 2019, after Butler completed an initial five-year term at the church, it was announced that the church's governing body would not be extending Butler's term for an additional five years. The official announcement described the decision as mutual. Later reports, however, cited other potentially contributing factors in the governing body's decision. These included retaliation against Butler for a sexual harassment claim she and others filed against a Church Council member, a visit to an education-based sex toy store with two church employees and a congregant during an out-of-town conference trip, and her requests to be compensated the same as her male predecessor and have protections to guard staff against church leaders who engaged in practices of harassment and bullying. A former church council member claimed that although the Church Council had conducted a full and comprehensive investigation into the lay leader accused of sexually harassing female staff members, the governing body voted to terminate their relationship with Butler after a rushed investigation.

== Invested Faith ==
In 2019, Butler founded Invested Faith, a non-profit funded by institutions and individuals. With the guidance of a board of advisors, the organization provides financial grants to faith-rooted social entrepreneurs.

== Beautiful and Terrible Things ==
In October 2023, Penguin Random House published Butler's book, Beautiful and Terrible Things. Its title was inspired by theologian Frederick Buechner's writings. Centered on the significance of authenticity in relationships and within communities of faith, Butler said: "If there's one thing I hope this book does, it is to give us a little bit of courage to tell the truth about our lives, especially as pastors."

== Personal life ==
Butler was raised in Hawaii and is the mother of three children. She is divorced.

== Bibliography ==
- Holy Disruption: A Manifesto for the Future of Faith Communities, Chalice Press, July 2023, with Rev. Dr. Dawn Darwin Weaks
- Beautiful and Terrible Things, Penguin Random House, 240 pp, October 2023, ISBN 9780399589485
