= Triennial Convention =

Old mainline Baptist denomination in the United States

General Missionary Convention of the Baptist Denomination in the United States of America for Foreign Missions (Triennial Convention)
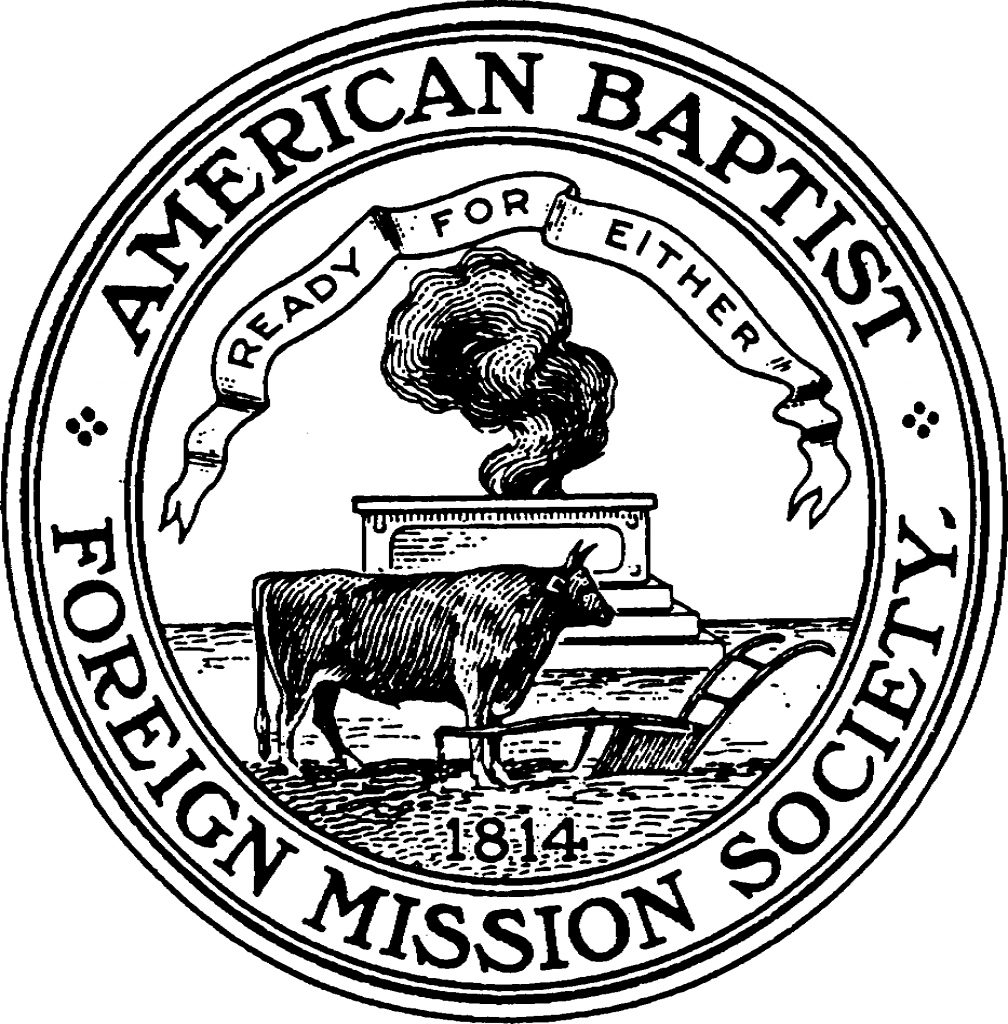
- Seal of the American Baptist Foreign Mission Society (ABFMS), established in 1814.
- Classification: Mainline Protestant
- Theology: Baptist
- Polity: Congregationalist
- State conventions & regional associations: 33
- Region: United States
- Origin: May 1814; Philadelphia, Pennsylvania
- Separations: Southern Baptist Convention (1845)
- Defunct: May 17, 1907 (reorganized as American Baptist Churches USA)
- Missionary organization: American Baptist Missionary Union; American Baptist Home Mission Society

The Triennial Convention, formally the General Missionary Convention of the Baptist Denomination in the United States of America for Foreign Missions, was the oldest Baptist denomination in the United States existing from 1814 to 1907. In that year, the Triennial Convention was reorganized into the current American Baptist Churches USA (ABCUSA).

The origins of the Triennial Convention date back to the colonial period, with the immigration of English and Welsh Baptist settlers to New England and the founding of Rhode Island Colony. Following an array of theological paths, Baptist churches were founded across America, most notably the First Baptist Church of Providence, in 1638. Although operating more independently, the early American Baptist churches were often unified for mutual cooperation and support in missionary activity. In the 18th century, following the church polity of the British Baptists, they established the first regional associations in America for fellowship, support, work, and education, later resulting in the founding of Brown University in 1764.

After the Second Great Awakening and the American Revolution, Baptists convened an assembly in Philadelphia, Pennsylvania, in 1814, and established the Triennial Convention mainly for foreign missions. The denomination assembled every three years, hence it was named "Triennial" Convention. Other Baptist societies were developed within the convention for various missional interests, including Home Missions, Publications, and later Education. In a controversy over slavery and missions policy, the Southern associations and state conventions split from the Triennial Convention in 1845 and founded the Southern Baptist Convention, before the Civil War. The schism left the Convention largely Northern in its composition of churches and membership.

== Historical background ==
Distinguished from other Christian and Protestant traditions by their commitment to credobaptism and high local church autonomy, the Baptist tradition have been present in the United States since Roger Williams founded the First Baptist Church in America in Providence, Rhode Island, in 1638. Baptist churches were soon found elsewhere in colonial America. The First Baptist Church of Boston was founded in 1665, and Pennepack Baptist Church in Philadelphia, Pennsylvania, was organized in 1688. The founding of First Baptist Church of Charleston, South Carolina, in the late 1690s marked the spread of Baptists to the South.

In the 18th and 19th centuries, Baptists began forming regional associations and societies to foster cooperation in missionary, benevolent, and educational work, such as the founding of Brown University. Associations could determine their own standards for fellowship and offer advice to churches, but local congregations governed themselves and ordained their own ministers. The first permanent Baptist association in America was the Philadelphia Association, established in 1707.

The Second Great Awakening inspired the establishment of foreign missions agencies to spread the Christian religion throughout the world. In 1810, the Congregationalists established the American Board of Commissioners for Foreign Missions. Two years later, the Congregationalist Board sent Adoniram Judson Jr. (1788–1850), Ann Hasseltine Judson (1789–1826), and Luther Rice to India. Upon arrival, however, the three missionaries repudiated infant baptism and became Baptists under the influence of British missionary William Carey (1761–1834), a founder of Britain's Baptist Missionary Society.

== Organization ==
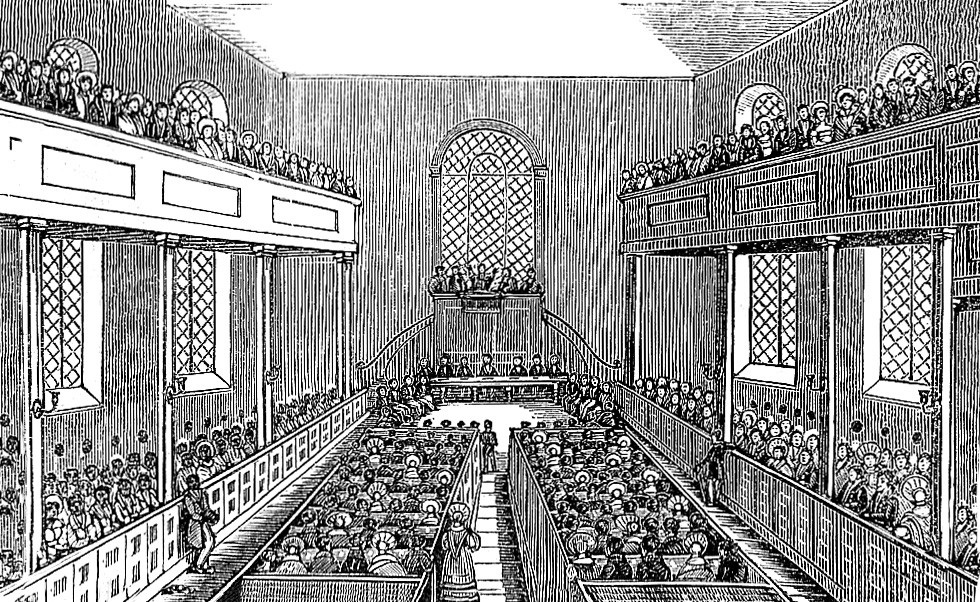
Establishment of the Triennial Convention in May 1814 in Philadelphia, Pennsylvania.

Carey and the three American missionaries mobilized Baptists in America to support the Judsons' planned mission trip to Burma. Their efforts led to the establishment in 1814 of the General Missionary Convention of the Baptist Denomination in the United States of America for Foreign Missions. The convention was tasked with collecting funds from Baptist groups and individuals to support foreign missions. The convention was called "Triennial" because the national body assembled every three years. Members of the denomination were called American Baptists or Triennial Baptists. At the Triennial Convention's first assembly between May 18 and 25, 1814, Richard Furman was elected president, the Baptist Board for Foreign Missions was created, and the denomination sent missionaries to China, Africa, and South America. Other state conventions, regional associations, and societies were being established, such as the Baptist General Tract Society (later renamed American Baptist Publication Society) in 1824 and the Home Mission Society in 1832. The various societies held their own conventions during sessions of the Triennial Convention.

By 1840, Baptists were in every state and territory as well as missions around the world. Alongside the Methodists, Baptists had grown to be one of the two largest denominations in the United States. Nevertheless, there were Baptists who opposed efforts to establish missions boards and denominational agencies as unbiblical. These Baptists became known as "anti-mission" or Primitive Baptists, while those who supported organized missionary work became known as Missionary Baptists. As early as 1838, African-American Baptists began organizing their own independent associations and conventions. Immigrants, such as Danish, Norwegian, Swedish and German Americans, also formed their own Baptist denominations along ethnic lines rather than affiliate with the Anglo-American oriented Triennial Convention.

== Slavery controversy ==
The Triennial Convention attempted to take no stated position on slavery. This moderate position allowed both abolitionists and slavery supporters to remain in the denomination. The majority of Triennial Baptists in the Northeast opposed slavery, while the growing number of Triennial Baptists in the Southeast supported slavery.

In 1843, the abolitionists in the Northeast founded the Northern Baptist Mission Society in opposition to slavery. During the "Georgia Test Case" of 1844, the Georgia State Convention proposed that a slaveowner, Elder James E. Reeve, be appointed as a missionary. The Foreign Mission Board refused to approve his appointment, recognizing the case as a challenge and not wanting to overturn their policy of neutrality in the slavery issue. They stated that slavery should not be introduced as a factor into deliberations about missionary appointments.

== Theological controversies ==
During the late 19th and early 20th centuries, the Triennial Convention took no official position on evolution. This moderate position accepted both the Bible and science, allowing Fundamentalists and Modernists to remain in the denomination. The Modernists in the urban Northeast accepted the position, while the Fundamentalists in the rural Northeast rejected the position but stayed in the Triennial Convention. The Triennial Convention supported the Social Gospel movement, but not the more radical ideas of Walter Rauschenbusch (1861–1918) and other Christian Socialists. In 1888, the Triennial Convention formed the American Baptist Education Society to organize support for affiliated schools, colleges, and seminaries.

== Reorganization ==
On May 17, 1907, in Washington, D.C., the Triennial Convention organized the American Baptist Education Society, the American Baptist Home Mission Society, the American Baptist Missionary Union, and the American Baptist Publication Society into its new structure: the Northern Baptist Convention. Governor of New York, Charles Evans Hughes (April 11, 1862 – August 27, 1948, served since 1907) (Republican) was elected the first president of the Northern Baptist Convention, while continuing his job as Governor. 29th President of the United States, Warren Gamaliel Harding (November 2, 1865 – August 2, 1923, served March 4, 1921 – August 2, 1923) (Republican) was a Northern Baptist by upbringing, faith, and self-identification, but he was a member of the Masonic Lodge. The Triennial Convention, now under the new structure of the Northern Baptist Convention, was renamed as American Baptist Convention in 1950, and as American Baptist Churches, USA in 1972.

== Beliefs ==
The Triennial Convention had the Philadelphia Confession of Faith of 1742 as one of its official confessions of faith but didn't force local churches to subscribe it. The Philadelphia Confession was a revision of the Second London Confession of Faith of 1689. The Second London Confession is a Particular Baptist creedal statement heavily inspired by the Westminster Confession of Faith. The Philadelphia Confession differed from the Second London one only by the addition of two new articles. One of the new articles allowed the singing of hymns as well as the traditional Psalms. The other made laying on of hands (Confirmation) after baptism optional. The Philadelphia Confession affirmed the following:

- Infallible authority of the Bible,
- Lordship and divinity of Jesus Christ,
- Autonomy of local churches,
- Spiritual Presence of Jesus in the Lord's Supper,
- Baptism only of believers by immersion, and
- Evangelism and missionary outreach.

The Triennial Convention also had the New Hampshire Confession of Faith of 1833. The New Hampshire Confession was drafted by John Newton Brown, D.D. (1803–1868), and other ministers, and was adopted by the New Hampshire Baptist Convention. The controversy of those days was free will versus predestination. While the New Hampshire Confession is shorter than the Philadelphia Confession, it affirms the Philadelphia Confession. The New Hampshire Confession states that "[Humans] by voluntary transgression fell from the holy and happy state [they were created]" and that "We believe that Election [predestination] is the eternal purpose of God, according to which he graciously regenerates, sanctifies, and saves sinners". However, many saw the New Hampshire Confession as accepting free will. The Free Will Baptists in the Northeast and West accepted the confession, while Calvinist Baptists in the Southeast rejected the confession but remained in the Triennial Convention.

== Notable members ==
- Adoniram Judson, missionary to Burma and Bible translator
- Ann Hasseltine Judson, first female foreign missionary
- Francis Wayland, economist, educator, abolitionist, and 4th president of Brown University
- John Newton Brown, church reformer and publisher
- William Bullein Johnson, last Southern president of the Triennial Convention
- William Colgate, industrialist and founder of the Colgate Company
- James Boorman Colgate, financier
- Samuel Colgate, manufacturer and president of Colgate Company
- Walter Rauschenbusch, Rochester theologian and leader of the Social Gospel movement
- Charles Evans Hughes, 11th Chief Justice of the United States, 36th governor of New York, and first president of the Northern Baptist Convention
- John D. Rockefeller, businessman, industrialist, and one of the richest person in modern history
- Laura Spelman Rockefeller, philanthropist, teacher, and abolitionist

== Bibliography ==
- Louis H. Everts. The Baptist Encyclopedia. Vol. 2. Ed. William Cathcart. Philadelphia: Louis H. Everts, 1883.
- Leonard, Bill J., ed. (1994). Dictionary of Baptists in America. Downers Grove: InterVarsity Press. ISBN 0-8308-1447-7.
- Snay, Mitchell. Gospel of Disunion: Religion and Separatism in the Antebellum South. New York: Cambridge University Press, 1993.
