= New Hampshire Confession of Faith =

Confession organized by missionaries

In 1833, Baptists in the United States agreed upon a confession of faith around which they could organize a missionary society under the Triennial Convention. The New Hampshire Confession of Faith was drawn up by the Rev. John Newton Brown of New Hampshire, and was adopted by the New Hampshire Baptist Convention. It was widely accepted by Baptists, especially in the Northern and Western States, as a clear and concise statement of their faith. They considered it in harmony with, but in a milder form than, the doctrines of older confessions which expressed the Calvinistic Baptist beliefs that existed at the time.

The Confession was later adopted as the articles of faith for the seminary that is now known as Southwestern Baptist Theological Seminary of Fort Worth, TX. B.H. Carroll and Calvin Goodspeed from the seminary delivered a series of lectures on the Confession sometime between 1905 and 1909. Their papers have been published as "A Commentary on the New Hampshire Confession of Faith."

== See also ==
- The Philadelphia Confession of Faith (1742)
- 1689 Baptist Confession of Faith
- 1644 Baptist Confession of Faith
