= George Hill Building =

Historic building in San Diego, California, U.S.

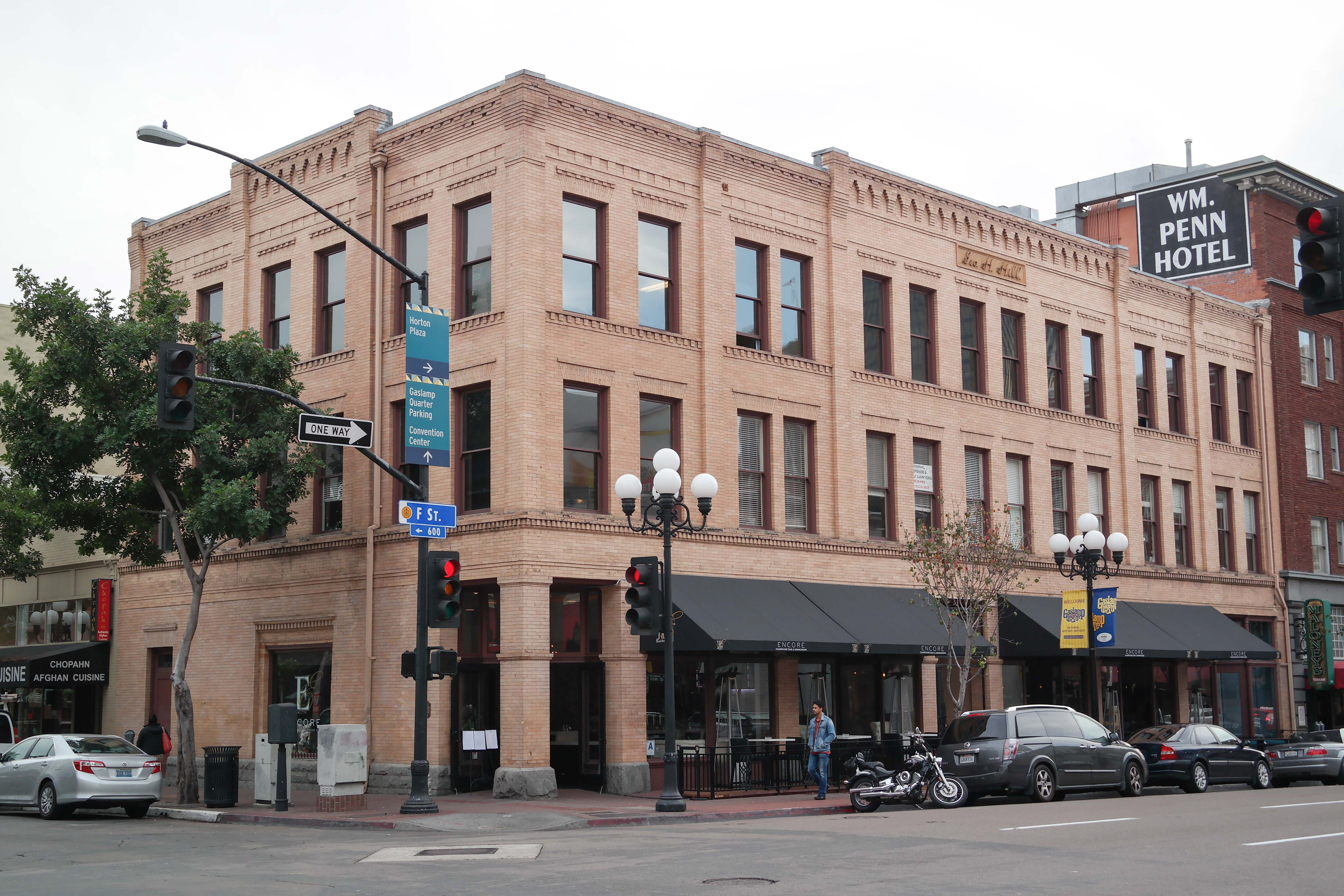
- The building's exterior in 2014
- Interactive map of the George Hill Building area

General information
- Location: 527 F Street, San Diego, California, United States
- Coordinates: 32.713527°N 117.159534°W

The George Hill Building is an historic structure located at 527 F Street in San Diego's Gaslamp Quarter, in the U.S. state of California. It was built in 1897.

The Gaslamp Quarter Historic Marker for the building, marker number 75, reads:

George Hill Building, 1897. This three-story structure was built to replace the landmark Horton’s Hall, which was partially destroyed by fire. The building was designed for five storerooms on the first floor, and thirty offices on the upper floors. The San Diego Normal School, now San Diego State University, once leased space on the upper floors. In 1920, the Ratner Cap Manufacturing Company, the fifth largest operation of its kind in the U.S. and first on the West Coast, moved in. Ratner’s later bought the copyrights to the Hang Ten trade name and footprint design.

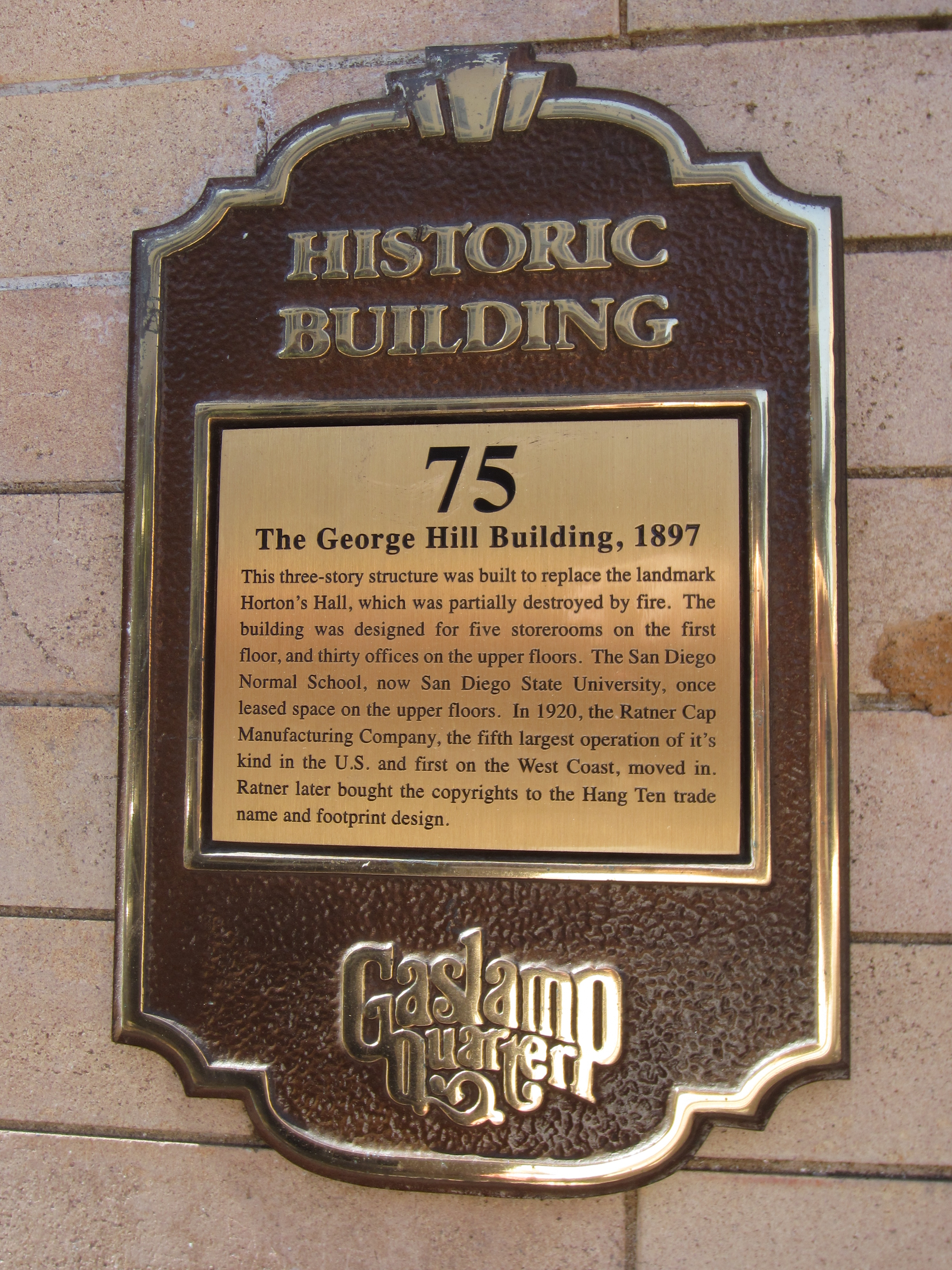
Plaque for the building, 2016

== See also ==
- List of Gaslamp Quarter historic buildings
