= Amy Butler (designer) =

American textile designer

Amy Butler is a creative designer from the United States, specializing in fabric designs and patterns.

== Career ==
Amy Butler is a former contributing editor for Country Living magazine, where she began publishing her designs. After moving back to her native Ohio with her husband, she established her freelance design company, Art of the Midwest, in 1992. Butler has diversified into several product ranges, including several books, stationery products, wallpaper, organic bedding and towels.

Butler recently decided to diversify the business further, and an electronic magazine launched in 2012, Blossom. Butler describes her "personal style" as "A fresh, modern take on vintage style".

Butler's work has been featured in editorial pieces for decorating and design magazines worldwide, including Better Homes and Gardens, Livingetc., Schönerwohnen, Marie Claire, Maison Coté Ouest, Burda Style, and many others. Butler is one of the top-selling quilting and home-sewing fabric designers, and is considered within the business to be a "celebrity fabric designer", similar to Kaffe Fassett, appearing often at large trade shows.

Butler has collaborated on a variety of projects with her husband, designer David Butler, including several books on topics such as traditional country cookery and philosophy. They also collaborate in the design of Blossom.

== Books by Amy Butler ==
Sewing

- Amy Butler's Style Stitches (photography by David Butler) (2010)
- Amy Butler's In Stitches (photography by Colin McGuire) (2006)
- Amy Butler's Midwest Modern (photography by David Butler) (2007)
- Amy Butler's Little Stitches for Little Ones (photography by Colin McGuire) (2008)
- Sew-It Kit (Photography by Colin McGuire) (2007)

Other

- Found Style (co-written with David Butler) (2003)
