= George W. Hill (pastor) =

Rev. George W. Hill
- Born: December 13, 1916; Los Angeles, California, U.S.
- Died: March 3, 2003 (aged 86); Claremont, California, U.S.
- Education: University of Southern California, Colgate Rochester Divinity School
- Occupations: Pastor and Peace Activist
- Spouse: Marjorie (Jones)

George W. Hill (December 13, 1916 – March 3, 2003) was an American Baptist pastor, a peace activist, and a leading liberal Protestant voice who played an important role in the founding of the United States Institute of Peace.

He was born in 1913 in Los Angeles, California. Hill attended the University of Southern California. He died in Claremont, California on March 3, 2003.

== Early life and education ==
Hill was born in Los Angeles and majored in banking and finance at the University of Southern California. He planned to go law school but was offered a position at the Lake Avenue Baptist Church in Rochester, New York. Through this experience, he decided to enter the ministry and entered Colgate Rochester Divinity School, from which he graduated in 1940. Hill was ordained at Lake Avenue Baptist on May 14, 1940.

== Pastoral positions ==
Hill's first church was Atwater Park Baptist Church in Pasadena where he served as pastor until 1943. He served as youth minister and then co-pastor at First Baptist Church of Pasadena from 1944 to 1954. In 1954, he returned to Lake Avenue Baptist Church in Rochester, where he served as senior pastor until 1971. From 1971 until 1986, he was senior pastor at Calvary Baptist Church in Washington, D.C., which had enough stature to be considered a church for President Jimmy Carter. He retired in 1986, but was called to serve as interim pastor, starting in 1988, at The Riverside Church in New York City, where he focused substantially on resolving fiscal issues at the church. He retired again from full-time ministry in 1989. In addition, Hill served on the board of the American Baptists.

Hill also had a regular television talk-show, The Pastor's Study.

== Activism ==
Hill engaged in a life of social activism grounded in his religious beliefs. For example, in the 40s, he opposed Japanese internment camps. Hill was President of the Rochester Council of Churches during the Rochester 1964 race riot. Many clergy supported political organizing attempts by the Industrial Areas Foundation, although many clergy came under significant pressure for this. This effort brought IAF and the churches into extensive conflict with Eastman Kodak, the leading company in the town. Hill was given the American Baptist's Edwin T. Dahlberg Peace Award for this in 1985

When Hill moved to Washington, D.C. to pastor Calvary Baptist Church, he shifted somewhat to national politics. He came involved in, and eventually chairman, of the National Peace Academy Campaign, which resulted in the United States Institute of Peace. Calvary was also located in a poorer neighborhood, which led to the church opening a homeless shelter in its basement.

After retiring, he was active in Pastors for Peace. In 1978, Hill led efforts to raise money for the bail of convicted spy Donald Humphrey.
