= District of Columbia Baptist Convention =

Coalition of Baptist churches near Washington, DC

The District of Columbia Baptist Convention (DCBC) is a coalition of Baptist churches in or near the Washington, DC area. The DCBC is affiliated with the American Baptist Churches USA and the Progressive National Baptist Convention. It also holds a separate membership in the Baptist World Alliance.

== History ==
The organization traces its founding to 1801 with the establishment of First Baptist Church in Washington DC. The first predecessor group to the DCBC was formed on November 26, 1877, as the Columbia Association of Baptist Churches.

Before May 2018, the DCBC was also affiliated with the Southern Baptist Convention (SBC). The SBC severed its relationship when the DCBC refused to expel Calvary Baptist Church after the congregation hired a legally married lesbian couple as co-pastors.

According to a Convention census released in 2023, it claimed 40,841 members and 163 churches.

== Mission and positions ==
The DCBC's slogan is "One Faith. Many Cultures. Endless Possibilities." The DCBC has not taken positions on controversial social issues including abortion and homosexuality, leaving those decisions to the individual churches.
