= American Baptist Churches USA =

Mainline Protestant denomination in the United States

- Official emblem of the American Baptist Churches USA
- Abbreviation: ABCUSA
- Classification: Mainline Protestant
- Orientation: Moderate to conservative, but with diverse tendencies.
- Theology: Baptist
- Polity: Congregationalist polity
- General Secretary: Rev. Dr. Gina C. Jacobs-Strain
- President: Rev. Nikita G. McCalister
- Regions: 34
- Associations: National Council of Churches; Baptist World Alliance
- Region: United States
- Language: No official language, but mostly English-speaking
- Headquarters: King of Prussia, Pennsylvania, U.S.
- Origin: May 17, 1907 (Reorganization of the Triennial Convention); Washington, D.C., U.S.
- Merger of: Triennial Convention related boards (1907)
- Absorbed: Free Will Baptist General Conference (1911)
- Separations: General Association of Regular Baptist Churches (1932); Conservative Baptist Association of America (1947)
- Congregations: 4,892
- Members: 1,107,206
- Missionary organization: International Ministries American Baptist Home Mission Society
- Tertiary institutions: 16
- Seminaries: 10
- Other names: Triennial Convention (1814–1907); Northern Baptist Convention (1907–1950); American Baptist Convention (1950–1972)
- Official website: www.abc-usa.org

The American Baptist Churches USA, abbreviated as ABCUSA, is a mainline Protestant and Baptist Christian denomination in the United States. The American Baptist Churches is the reorganization from 1907 of the Triennial Convention, established in 1814. It is rooted in the early English and Welsh Baptist settlers in America, especially with the foundation of Rhode Island Colony, tracing its history to the First Baptist Church in America, established by Roger Williams in 1638. The Triennial Convention became the Northern Baptist Convention in 1907, which was renamed as the American Baptist Convention from 1950 to 1972. The ABCUSA headquarters is located in King of Prussia, Pennsylvania. The American Baptist Churches cooperates with the Baptist World Alliance, the Baptist Joint Committee, and the World Council of Churches.

Although the denomination is considered mainline Protestant, one of the Seven Sisters of American Protestantism, varying theological and missional emphases may be found among its congregations, including evangelical, conservative, and charismatic orientations. In 2025, Pew Research Center published the Religious Landscape Survey, estimating that 1 percent of US adults, or 2.6 million people, self-identify as adherents of the American Baptist Churches USA.

== History ==
=== Colonial New England Baptists ===
The American Baptist Churches USA have their origins in the First Baptist Church in Providence, Rhode Island, now the First Baptist Church in America, founded in 1638 by the minister Roger Williams. Regarded by the more dogmatic Congregationalists of the Massachusetts Bay Colony as a heretic for his views, Williams was banished into the New England wilderness where he, John Clarke, and his Congregationalists and Baptists followers created the settlement of Providence and later, the colony of Rhode Island. Williams is credited with being the pioneer of bringing the Baptist tradition to America, the founder of the state of Rhode Island, and the first highly visible public leader in America to call for the separation of the Church from state.

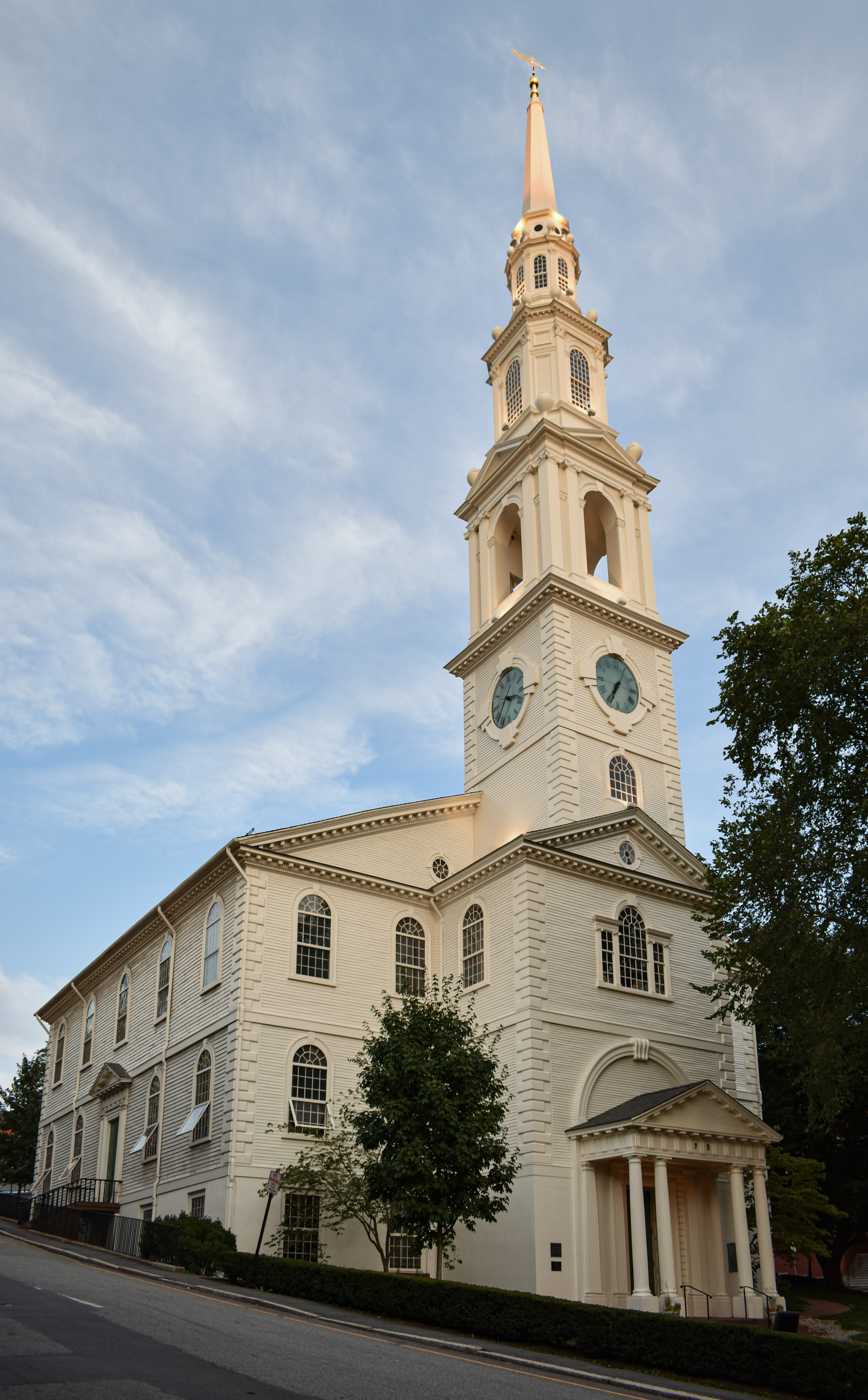
The First Baptist Church in America was formed in 1638 in Providence, Rhode Island.

=== Triennial Convention (1814–1907) ===
Operating under a congregationalist polity, Baptist churches in America existed autonomously from one another, following an array of Protestant theological paths, but were often unified in their missions to evangelize. In the 18th century, they established the first Baptist regional associations in America for fellowship, support, work, and education, resulting in the founding of Brown University in Rhode Island, in 1764. The Philadelphia Baptist Association, headquartered in Andorra, at Andorra Baptist Church, was one of these regional associations and it is considered the oldest Baptist regional association still in existence in the United States, linked to the founding of Brown. With the Second Great Awakening, evangelical missions led to the establishment of the national Triennial Convention in 1814, a collaborative organization by local churches, regional associations, and state conventions to organize, fund, and deploy missionaries. Some used the Philadelphia Confession of Faith and the New Hampshire Confession as guides to faith. The modern-day ABCUSA is the continuation of the Triennial Convention, as a renewed version or reorganization in its structure. Through the Triennial Convention, a number of mission-oriented societies were formed, including the American Baptist Foreign Mission Society (1814), American Baptist Home Mission Society (1832), American Baptist Publication Society (1841), and the American Baptist Education Society (1888).

In May 1845, the majority of Baptist churches in the South split from the Triennial Convention largely in response to the decision of its delegates to ban slave holders from becoming commissioned missionaries. They went to found their own organization: the Southern Baptist Convention (SBC). The Triennial Convention was structured loosely and offered local churches full autonomy, in contrast, however, was the SBC that had a more centralized organizational structure for carrying on missionary and benevolent work, a more traditional characteristic of Baptist ecclesiastical polity. The Triennial Convention continued to work through the separate cooperating societies for missions and benevolence.

In 1882, May Jones became the first ordained female minister in the convention.

=== Northern Baptist Convention (1907–1950) ===
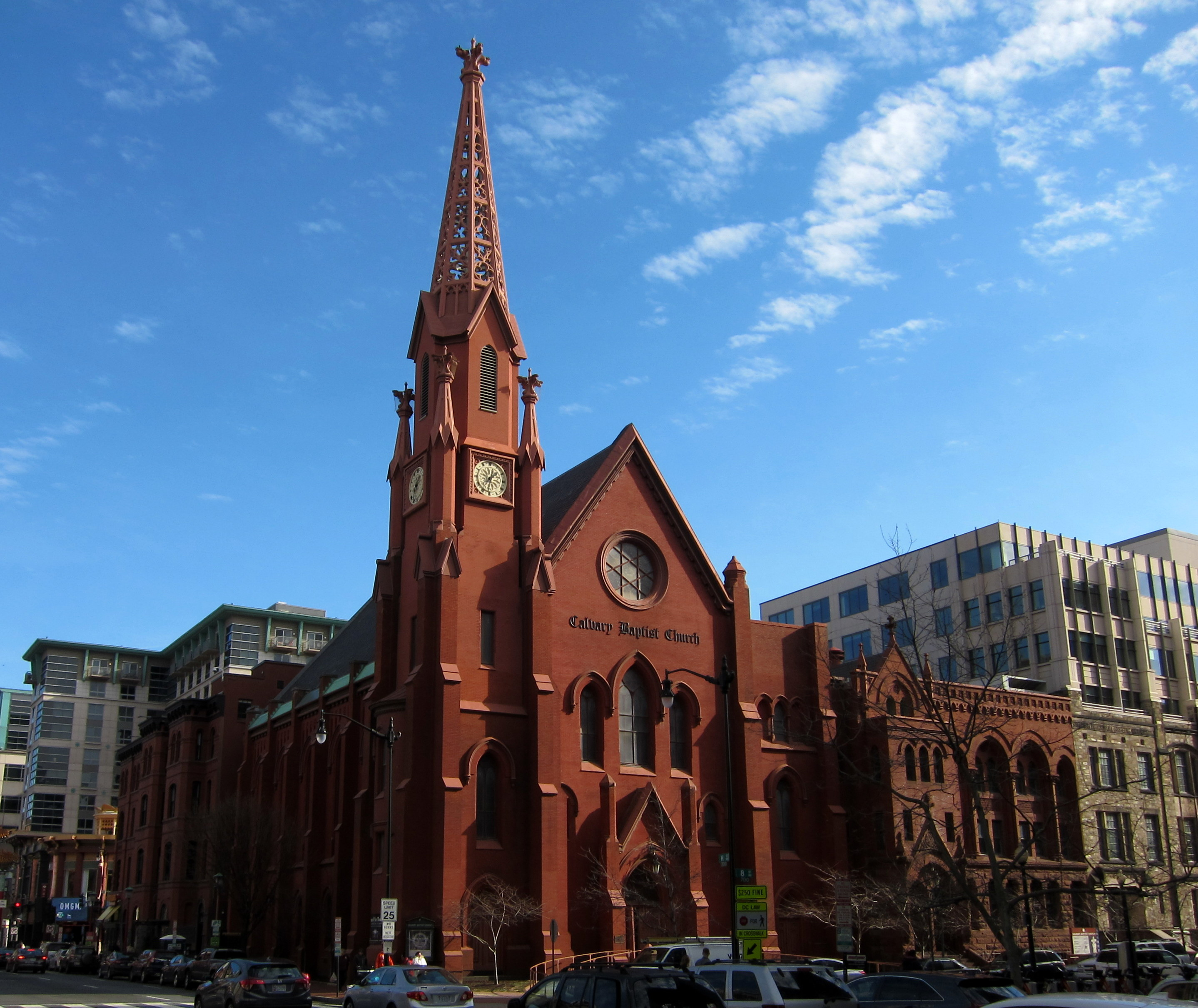
At Calvary Baptist Church in Washington, D.C., the Northern Baptist Convention first met to bring the 19th century mission societies of the Triennial Convention closer together.

The Northern Baptist Convention was organized in Washington, D.C., on May 17, 1907. Charles Evans Hughes, then governor of New York and later chief justice of the United States, served the body as president.

The purpose of the Northern Baptist Convention as a reorganization of the Triennial Convention was to bring about a consistent cooperation among the convention societies and Baptist bodies out of the mainstream organization then existing. It was the first step in bringing together Baptists in the North "with ties to the historic American Baptist mission societies in the nineteenth century." These had contributed to establishing many schools for freedmen in the South after the American Civil War, as well as working on issues of health and welfare. Many of their missionaries and members had worked as teachers in the South. In 1911, most Free Will Baptist churches merged with it.

Due to the development of theological liberalism in some affiliated seminaries, such as Crozer Theological Seminary, conservative seminaries have been founded by convention ministers, including the Northern Baptist Theological Seminary in Chicago in 1913 and the Eastern Baptist Theological Seminary in Philadelphia in 1925.

=== American Baptist Convention (1950–1972) ===
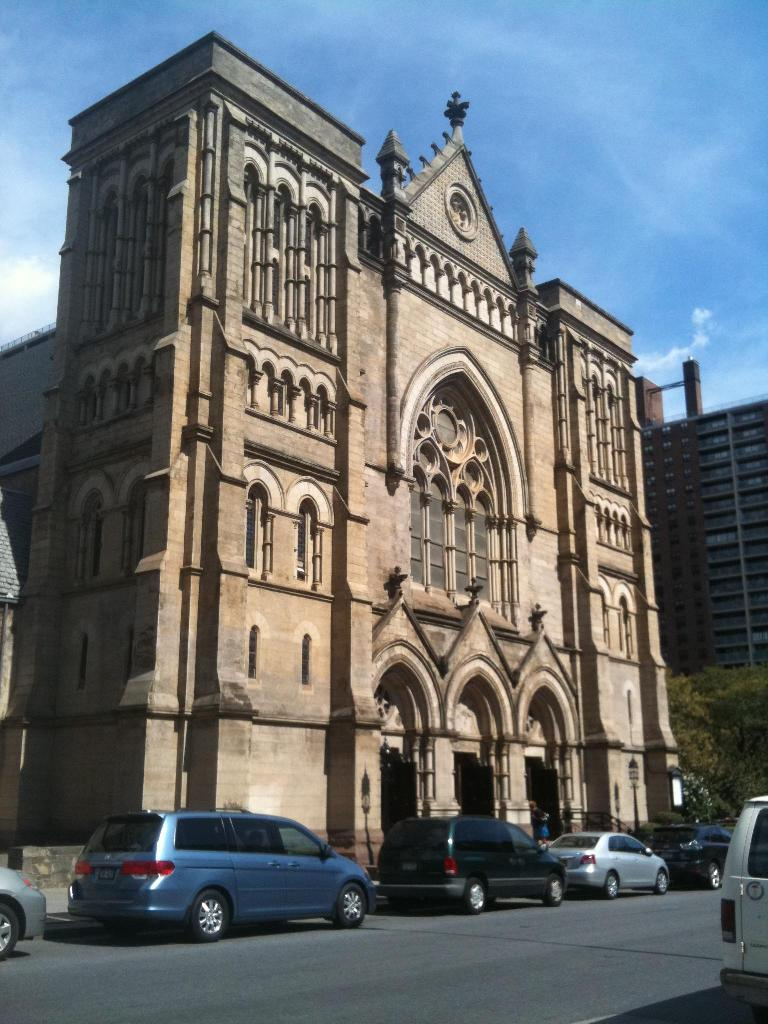
Emmanuel Baptist Church in Brooklyn, New York City, affiliated with ABCUSA

The name of the convention was changed in 1950 to the American Baptist Convention (ABC), and it operated under this name until 1972. It was the second step at bringing together on a national level Baptists with ties to the mission societies. The ABC was characterized from 1950 to 1966 with annual resolutions at its conventions having to do with the civil rights movement and race relations.

Without exception, these resolutions were progressive and genuinely encompassing. They addressed both the need for individual change in attitude and action, and the need for broader social change that could only be instituted through political action.

As in many cases, the rhetoric of the annual assemblies was sometimes ahead of local activity, but the denomination gradually made progress. In 1964, it created the Baptist Action for Racial Brotherhood (BARB), which early the next year produced a pamphlet outlining actions for change in local churches. In 1968, the convention was challenged by "Black American Baptist Churchmen Speak To the American Baptist Convention", demands that challenged how the denomination had "conducted its business relative to black American Baptists."

The black churchmen said the convention had excluded them from decision-making positions, even while working with good intentions on behalf of black American Baptists. The following year, Dr. Thomas Kilgore Jr., pastor of the Second Baptist Church of Los Angeles, was elected the first black president of the convention. The 1968 assembly also voted to create the Study Commission on Denominational Structure (SCODS). Its recommendations changed the denomination in a variety of ways, after being adopted at the 1972 assembly.

=== American Baptist Churches USA (1972–present) ===
To reflect its new structure, the convention in 1972 changed its name to the American Baptist Churches USA. Rather than relying on decision-making at the annual assembly by whichever churches happened to send delegates, the SCODS restructuring resulted in the following:

A General Board was composed of duly elected representatives from geographically designated districts. Three-fourths of those representatives would be elected by the American Baptist regional bodies; one-fourth would be elected as at-large representatives, or in the official terminology, "Nationally Nominated Representatives". These representatives would be "chosen so as to provide the necessary balance among the Representatives in respect of racial/ethnic inclusiveness, geographic area, age, gender, and desirable skills.

== Governance ==
The American Baptists Churches USA has a congregationalist polity emphasizing local church autonomy. Local churches are organized into 34 regions; the ABCUSA General Board makes policy for the denomination's national agencies.

However, board resolutions are not binding on local congregations. Three-fourths of the representatives to the ABCUSA General Board are nominated and elected by the regions. One-fourth of the representatives are nominated by the ABCUSA Nominating Committee and are elected by the regions. The General Secretary of the ABCUSA executes the policies and decisions of the General Board. Rev. Dr. Lee B. Spitzer was called as ABCUSA General Secretary on May 8, 2017.

A substantial portion of the ABCUSA consists of historically and predominantly African American churches that may have joint affiliations with the ABCUSA and historic bodies such as the National Baptist Convention or the Progressive National Baptist Convention. Abyssinian Baptist Church in New York City is one of the many African American churches jointly affiliated with the ABCUSA and National Baptist Convention. Since 1970, the ABCUSA and Progressive National Baptists have officially partnered.

=== Regions ===
The ABCUSA consists of 34 regional associations and conventions:

Region	Headquarters	Area(s) served	Number of churches	Executive minister	Notes
American Baptist Churches of Alaska	Anchorage, Alaska	The state of Alaska	11	Alonzo B. Patterson	
American Baptist Churches of Connecticut	West Hartford, Connecticut	The state of Connecticut	120	Rev. Dr. Harry Riggs II	
American Baptist Churches of Greater Indianapolis	Indianapolis, Indiana	The Indianapolis Metro Area	39	Rev. Joan C. Friesen	
American Baptist Churches of Indiana and Kentucky	Franklin, Indiana	Most of Indiana (except for Indianapolis), and five churches in Kentucky	290	Rev. Mark A Thompson	Previously known as: General Association of Baptists in the State of Indiana (1833–64); Indiana State Baptist Convention (1864–1896); Indiana Baptist Convention (1896–1987); American Baptist Churches of Indiana (1987–2000); American Baptist Churches of Indiana and Kentucky (since 2000); This region's legal name is still the Indiana Baptist Convention.
American Baptist Churches of Los Angeles, Southwest, and Hawaii	Glendale, California	Southern California (including the Los Angeles Metro Area), Hawaii, Arizona, and the Las Vegas Metro Area	151	Andrew Quient	
American Baptist Churches of Maine	Augusta, Maine	The state of Maine		Rev. Dr. Alfred Fletcher	
American Baptist Churches of Massachusetts	Groton, Massachusetts	The state of Massachusetts	246	Rev. Dr. Mary Day Miller	One of seven ABCUSA regions known to support full inclusion of LGBTQ+ persons into Baptist life
American Baptist Churches of Metro Chicago	Chicago, Illinois	The Chicago area	57	Rev. David Gregg	One of seven ABCUSA regions known to support full inclusion of LGBTQ+ persons into Baptist life
American Baptist Churches of Metro New York	New York City, New York	The New York Metropolitan Area	191	Rev. Dr. Cheryl F. Dudley	One of seven ABCUSA regions known to support full inclusion of LGBTQ+ persons into Baptist life
American Baptist Churches of Michigan	East Lansing, Michigan	The state of Michigan	137	Rev. Brian Johnson	Formerly known as the Michigan Baptist Convention
Churches Helping Churches American Baptist Churches of Nebraska	Omaha, Nebraska	The state of Nebraska	63	Rev. Dr. Greg Mamula	Legal name: Nebraska Baptist State Convention. Ethnically diverse community of churches.
American Baptist Churches of New Jersey	Trenton, New Jersey	The state of New Jersey	277	Rev. Miriam Mendez	
American Baptist Churches of New York State	Syracuse, New York	Most of New York, except for the Rochester-Genesee and Metro NYC areas	282	Rev. Dr. James Kelsey	
American Baptist Churches of Ohio	Granville, Ohio	Most of Ohio, except for the Cleveland area	250	Rev. Mark E. Click	
American Baptist Churches of Pennsylvania and Delaware	Mechanicsburg, Pennsylvania	Most of Pennsylvania (except for Philadelphia) and all of Delaware	300	Rev. Mark Mahserjian-Smith and Rev. Jeffrey Johnson	
American Baptist Churches of Puerto Rico	Carolina, Puerto Rico	Puerto Rico	113	Rev. Edgardo M. Caraballo	Known in Spanish as "Iglesias Bautistas de Puerto Rico"
American Baptist Churches of Rhode Island	Exeter, Rhode Island	The state of Rhode Island	69	Rev. Dr. Courtny Davis Olds	
American Baptist Churches of the Central Pacific Coast	Portland, Oregon	Central and Northern California, western Oregon, and two churches in Washington	72	Steve Bils	
American Baptist Churches of the Central Region	Topeka, Kansas	Kansas, 14 churches in Oklahoma, one church in Arkansas	205	Gregg Hemmen	Formerly known as the Kansas Baptist Convention until 1979
American Baptist Churches of the Dakotas	Sioux Falls, South Dakota	North Dakota and South Dakota	50	Rev. Dr. Aaron Kilbourn	
American Baptist Churches of the Great Rivers Region	Springfield, Illinois	Most of Illinois (except for the Chicago area), and all of Missouri	205	Patty King Bilyeu	
American Baptist Churches of the Rochester/Genesee Region	Rochester, New York	Mainly the Rochester/Genesee area, but other churches from 11 states affiliate with this region (see notes)	51	Rev. Dr. Sandra L. DeMott Hasenauer	One of seven ABCUSA regions known to support full inclusion of LGBTQ+ persons into Baptist life. Churches from other states that either left or were removed from their region over the LGBTQ+ issue affiliate with this region.
American Baptist Churches of the Rocky Mountains	Centennial, Colorado	Colorado, New Mexico, Utah, Wyoming		Rev. Dr. Steve Van Ostran	
American Baptist Churches of the South	Woodlawn, Maryland	Alabama, Arkansas, Delaware, District of Columbia, Florida, Georgia, Kentucky, Louisiana, Maryland, Mississippi, North Carolina, Oklahoma, South Carolina, Tennessee, Texas, Virginia, West Virginia	234	Rev. Dr. James Mitchell Harrison	
American Baptist Churches of Vermont and New Hampshire	West Lebanon, New Hampshire	Vermont and New Hampshire	147	Rev. Dale R. Edwards	
American Baptist Churches of Wisconsin	Elm Grove, Wisconsin	The state of Wisconsin	61	Rev. Mindi Welton-Mitchell	One of seven ABCUSA regions known to support full inclusion of LGBTQ+ persons into Baptist life
Cleveland Baptist Association	Cleveland, Ohio	The Cleveland metropolitan area	39	Rev. Dr. Yvonne B. Carter	
District of Columbia Baptist Convention	Washington, D.C.	Washington, D.C.	139	Rev. Trisha Miller Manarin	This body has 151 churches total, but only 139 are affiliated with the ABCUSA. This body was dually aligned with the ABCUSA and the Southern Baptist Convention until May 2018.
Evergreen Association of American Baptist Churches	Kent, Washington	Washington and portions of Alaska, California, Colorado, Idaho, and Utah	55	Douglas Avilesbernal	One of seven ABCUSA regions known to support full inclusion of LGBTQ+ persons into Baptist life
Growing Healthy Churches	Clovis, California	Mainly central California, but churches from several states affiliate with this region.	167	Dr. Timothy H. Brown	
Mid-American Baptist Churches	Urbandale, Iowa	Iowa and Minnesota	123	Rev. Jacquline Saxon	
Mission Northwest	Post Falls, Idaho	Primarily Idaho, Washington, Montana, and Utah, with one church each in Nevada, California, Arizona, and Alaska	156	Dr. Charles E. Revis	
Philadelphia Baptist Association	Philadelphia, Pennsylvania	Philadelphia metropolitan area	121	Rev. Dr. James E. McJunkin Jr.	Oldest continuous association of Baptist churches, established in 1707. One of seven ABCUSA regions known to support full inclusion of LGBTQ+ persons into Baptist life
West Virginia Baptist Convention	Parkersburg, West Virginia	The state of West Virginia	345	Dr. Michael Sisson	

== Statistics ==
The majority of the denomination's congregations are concentrated in the Midwest and Northeast United States.

In 1925, there were just over 1.4 million members. Membership peaked in the early 1980s at around 1.6 million. Since the beginning of the 21st century, membership began to decline and stagnate again, with the ABCUSA reporting 1,145,647 members in 5,057 churches at the end of 2017. According to a census published by the denomination in 2024, it claimed 4,802 churches and 1,107,206 members.

According to a study by the Pew Research Center in 2014, 21% of its members were aged 18–29; 28% 30–49; 32% aged 50–64 and 19% aged 65 and older. While 51% of its membership were Baby Boomers, the Silent Generation, and the Greatest Generation, the remainder were Generation X, older millennials, and younger millennials, making it slightly younger than the National Baptist Convention and Southern Baptist Convention. Approximately 40% of its membership were men and 60% were women, and the ABCUSA's churches were 73% non-Hispanic white, 10% non-Hispanic black or African American, 1% Asian, 11% Hispanic or Latino American, and 5% multiracial or other.

Theologically, the Pew Research Center's 2014 study determined 83% of the ABCUSA believes in God with absolute certainty, and 15% believed fairly certainly; 73% believed religion was very important and 24% considered it somewhat important. About 42% of members attended churches at least once a week, while 41% attended once or twice a month; 16% seldom or never attend church. An estimated 69% prayed daily, and 19% prayed weekly. Among its membership, 48% read Scripture at least once a week, and 15% once or twice a month; 53% believe the Bible should be taken literally, while 27% believe it is still the Word of God, yet should not be taken completely literally.

== Beliefs ==
Several congregations of the American Baptist Churches USA affirm the historic New Hampshire Confession of Faith. American Baptists believe that the Bible is the inspired word of God and the final authority in matters of faith. The ABCUSA affirms the Trinity, that the one God exists as three persons in complete unity: God the Father, God the Son, and God the Holy Spirit. They confess Jesus Christ as Savior and Lord through whom those who believe can have fellowship with God. He died, taking on the sins of the world, and was resurrected, triumphing over sin and death.

ABCUSA churches recognize two ordinances/sacraments: believer's baptism and the Lord's Supper. Baptism is by immersion, and those being baptized must be of an age to understand its significance. Believing in the priesthood of all believers, the ABCUSA affirms the freedom of individual Christians and local churches to interpret scripture as the Holy Spirit leads them.

=== Ordination of women ===
In 1965, it adopted a resolution affirming gender equality and the ordination of women in churches.

=== Marriage ===
In 1972, at the Denver convention in Colorado, progressive churches founded the American Baptists Concerned for Sexual Minorities network for the inclusion of LGBTQ people. And, homosexual issues have been a point of contention in the ABCUSA since the 1987 Biennial Meeting.

In October 1992, the ABCUSA General Council adopted a resolution affirming that the practice of homosexuality is incompatible with Christian teaching. Following, at the San Jose, California convention in 1993, the Association of Welcoming and Affirming Baptists was founded by members to bring together inclusive churches for LGBTQ people.

Since 1995, regional conventions and associations of ABCUSA have carried out excommunications of various churches which have become members of the Association of Welcoming and Affirming Baptists.

So far, at least seven regions in the ABCUSA (Evergreen, Wisconsin, Rochester-Genesee, Metro Chicago, Metropolitan New York, Massachusetts, and Philadelphia) support full inclusion of homosexuals into Baptist life. Many ABCUSA churches have also partnered with the Association of Welcoming and Affirming Baptists, which formed at the 1993 Biennial Meeting.

However, several other ABCUSA regions and churches have opposed affirmation of homosexuality, bisexuality, and transgender identity. In 2004, the ABC Central Region reaffirmed the 1992 resolution. At its 2005 annual meeting, the West Virginia Baptist Convention, which had a history of proposing resolutions opposing liberal views on homosexual inclusion, narrowly rejected a proposal to withdraw from the ABCUSA over its refusal to discipline those regions that have supported homosexual-friendly policies. The Indiana-Kentucky region has also proposed a change in the denomination's bylaws that would prohibit the transfer of churches into another region if removed from the region because of the issue of homosexuality.

In November 2005, the ABCUSA General Council adopted a resolution recognizing only marriage between a man and a woman.

In May 2006, the American Baptist churches in the Southwest Pacific voted to adopt the name Transformation Ministries and to leave the convention effective November, due to the convention’s refusal to implement a 1992 resolution opposing the inclusion of LGBTQ people. The convention responded that it wanted to respect the autonomy of local churches and that it did not want to carry out excommunications.

Each local church is autonomous and permitted to perform same-sex marriages if they opt to do so. For example, Calvary Baptist Church (Washington, D.C.), affiliated with the ABCUSA, performs same-sex marriages. In 2013, an ABCUSA church in Washington, D.C., ordained the denomination's first openly transgender minister.

The ABCUSA has consistently allowed each congregation to determine whether or not to perform same-sex marriages, or ordain LGBT clergy.

In August 2024, the denomination’s president asked the Association of Welcoming and Affirming Baptists to remove any mention of a partnership between the two organizations.

== Schools ==
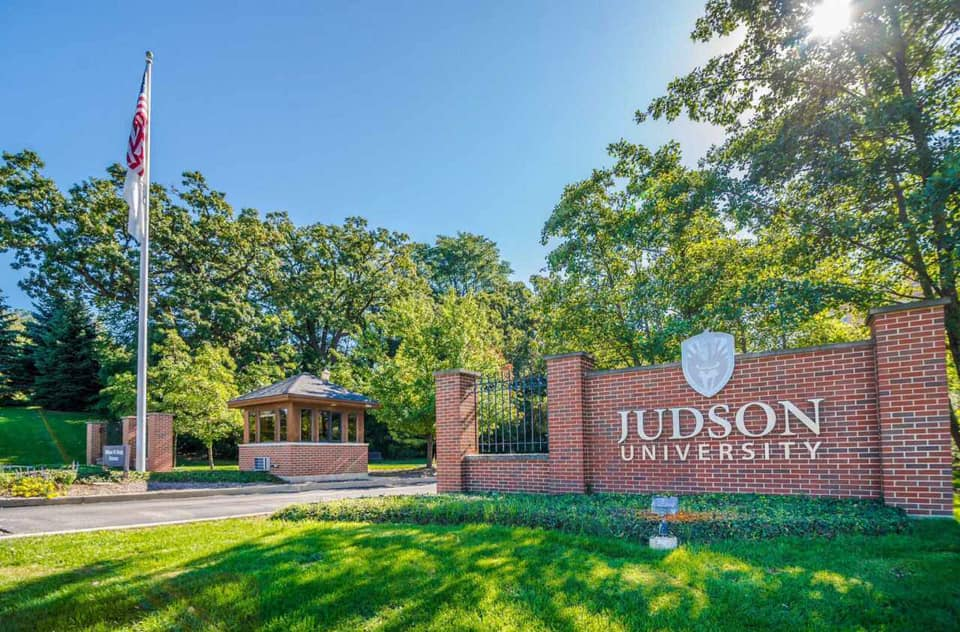
Entrance to Judson University in Elgin, Illinois, affiliated with the Convention

The ABCUSA has 16 universities and colleges affiliated with it, and a number of home and foreign missionary societies such as the American Baptist Home Mission Society and International Ministries. Among its universities and colleges, some are also dually-affiliated with the National Baptists—predominantly African American or Black Baptist denominations founded by freedmen and slaves. Additionally, there are 10 seminaries affiliated with the American Baptist Churches USA:

- Andover Newton Theological School, Newton, Massachusetts, part of Yale Divinity from 2018
- Berkeley School of Theology (formerly called the American Baptist Seminary of the West), Berkeley, California
- Central Baptist Theological Seminary, Shawnee, Kansas
- Colgate Rochester Crozer Divinity School, Rochester, New York
- Evangelical Seminary of Puerto Rico, San Juan, Puerto Rico
- Morehouse School of Religion, Atlanta, Georgia
- Northern Seminary, Lisle, Illinois
- Palmer Theological Seminary, St. David's, Pennsylvania
- Shaw University Divinity School, Raleigh, North Carolina
- Samuel DeWitt Proctor School of Theology, Virginia Union University, Richmond, Virginia

== Notable members ==
Includes Northern Baptists (1907–1950) and American Baptists (1950–present)

- Wayland Hoyt (1838–1910), minister and author
- John D. Rockefeller (1839–1937), oil magnate and philanthropist
- Walter Rauschenbusch (1861–1918), theologian and pastor, key figure of the Social Gospel and single tax movements
- Rev. Lena B. Mathes (1861–1951), educator, social reformer, ordained minister
- Charles Evans Hughes (1862–1948), 36th Governor of New York, 11th Chief Justice of the United States, and first president of the Northern Baptist Convention
- John D. Rockefeller Jr. (1874–1960), financier and philanthropist
- Tony Campolo (1935–2024) American sociologist, pastor, author
- Kamala Harris (b. 1964), Former Vice President of the United States

== See also ==
- Born again
- Baptist beliefs
- Believers' Church
- Christianity in the United States
