= John Newton Brown =

John Newton Brown (June 29, 1803 – May 14, 1868) was an influential Baptist teacher, minister and publisher in the 19th century.

He was born in New London, Connecticut, and attended Madison College (now known as Colgate University) where he graduated at the head of his class in 1823. Ordained the following year, he spent many years traveling New England, serving as minister in Buffalo, New York, Malden, Massachusetts, and Exeter, New Hampshire, as well as a teaching position at the Academical and Theological Institution of New Hampton, New Hampshire, before ill health forced him to travel south where he took up a ministry in Lexington, Virginia, in 1845.

In 1848 he became editorial secretary of the American Baptist Publication Society in Philadelphia, Pennsylvania, and was editor of its publications the Christian Chronicle and National Baptist. It was under his tenure that a number of influential works of the day were published under his direction.

Brown was one of the authors of the New Hampshire Confession of Faith in 1833, which was a more moderate expression of the more Calvinistic Baptist beliefs that existed at the time, and was widely accepted in the northern United States. His name has become the one most associated with this work.

Brown also authored a book of poetry, "Emily and Other Poems," (1840) which was dedicated to a sister who had died young.

Brown died on May 14, 1868, in the Philadelphia neighborhood of Germantown.
