= Weishampel =

Weishampel is the name of several people

- John Frederick Weishampel (1808–1883), minister
- John Frederick Weishampel Jr.
- David B. Weishampel (born 1952), paleobiologist/paleontologist

Weishampel can also be spelled

- Weishample (alternative American spelling and the name of the town Weishample, Pennsylvania)
- Weisshaubl (traditional German spelling)
