= Winebrenner =

Winebrenner may refer to:

- Jenna Winebrenner (born 1999), American soccer player
- John Winebrenner (1797–1860), founder of the Churches of God General Conference
  - Churches of God General Conference (Winebrenner)
  - Winebrenner Theological Seminary
- Winebrenner Run, Pennsylvania
- Winebrenners Crossroad, West Virginia
