= Maria Woodworth-Etter =

American evangelist (1844–1924)

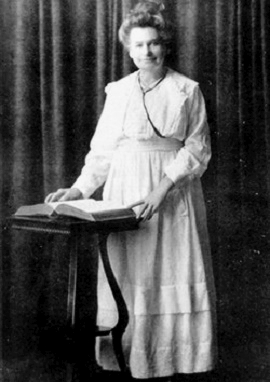
Maria Woodworth-Etter in her later years

Maria Beulah Woodworth-Etter (July 22, 1844–September 16, 1924) was an American healing evangelist. Her ministry style was a model for Pentecostalism and the later Charismatic movement, earning her the title "Mother of Pentecost" in some circles.

== Life ==
Woodworth-Etter was born in New Lisbon, Columbiana County, Ohio in 1844, as Mariah Beulah Underwood, the fourth daughter of Samuel and Matilda Underwood. Despite her first name often being spelled as Maria, it was pronounced as Ma-rai-ah.

Her father Samuel was an alcoholic and her family was often in poverty. Neither of her parents were religious, and she was not exposed to church until her teen years. When she was eleven, in 1855, her father died and she was forced to work in order to help provide for her family. She became born again at the beginning of the Third Great Awakening at the age of thirteen. Maria immediately heard the call of God and dedicated her life to the Lord. It was said that she had fainted during her baptism and she recalled a light enveloping her. Of this calling she would later write, "I heard the voice of Jesus calling me to go out in the highways and hedges and gather in the lost sheep."

In 1863, she married Philo Horace Woodworth, whom she divorced for infidelity in 1891. She had six children with Woodworth, five of whom died young. Philo originally did not approve of his wife becoming an evangelist and delayed her calling for 18 months. Once he allowed her to be a traveling preacher, he seemingly came along for financial gain. At her revivals and tent meetings, Philo would sell ice cream and photographs. Newspapers took note of his complete disinterest in his wife's preaching activities. Before their divorce, Philo tried to defame his wife, but churches came to Mrs. Woodworth's defense.

In 1902, she married Samuel Etter, who died in 1914. Unlike her first husband, Mr. Etter often aided Woodworth with her evangelist activities and remained alongside her during preaching tours.

She studied the Scriptures and began preaching the Lord's divine will in healing. It didn't take long to see that evangelism and healing went hand in hand as thousands were won to Christ as a result of seeing others healed. Sister Etter pioneered the way for Pentecostal manifestations that are so common in Charismatic and Pentecostal groups today.

Her only surviving daughter died in 1924 after a streetcar accident. Etter died only a few months later on September 16, 1924 at the age of 80.

== Ministry ==
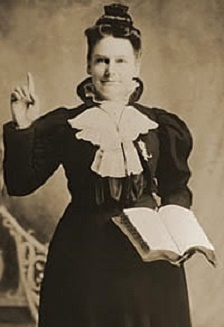
Woodworth-Etter in her earlier years of ministry

Her earliest exposure to religion was through a local Disciples of Christ congregation. After her marriage, she chose to enter evangelistic ministry. Prohibited from public preaching among the Disciples, she found support in a local Quaker meeting. It was while associating with the Quakers that she received the baptism in the Holy Spirit while praying for an "anointing for service".

After this experience, she began to preach. Reporting hundreds of conversions, her campaigns attracted reporters from across the country. Impressed by her preaching ability, several denominations vied for her attention. The Quakers, Methodism and "Bible Christians" made her lucrative offers, but her dream was to evangelize in the western states. Many denominations did not allow female pastors, and she shied away from those groups, feeling that they contradicted her calling from God. She was briefly affiliated with the Brethren in Christ but eventually joined the Church of God of the General Eldership founded by John Winebrenner. She was dismissed from the Church of God in 1904.

She began to pray for the sick in 1885, believing that those with sufficient faith would be healed. Healing was reported on many occasions, bringing greater notoriety to Woodworth. Newspapers around the United States printed articles about faith healing that was reported to have occurred at these events. Her meetings also became known for people falling to the floor in trance-like states, similar to being Slain in the Spirit common a few decades later in the Pentecostal movement. These people would later report profound spiritual experiences while in such a state. As she preached throughout the nation, her reputation grew, leading her to purchase an 8,000-seat tent in which to conduct her services. In 1912 she joined the young Pentecostal movement and preached widely in Pentecostal circles until her death, helping found the Assemblies of God in 1914 despite never being a formal member.

In addition to being a preacher, evangelist, and faith healer, Woodworth was also said to have given prophecies, including that San Francisco would be destroyed by an earthquake and tidal wave in 1890, causing about 1,000 people to flee the city.

In 1918 she founded Woodworth-Etter's Tabernacle, what is today the Lakeview Church (Temple) of Indianapolis, Indiana. She had chosen Indianapolis for her church because of its central location in the United States at the time, having been known as the Crossroads of America. From the start, her church was multi-ethnic and allowed Whites, African Americans, Asians, and Native Americans all to worship together despite criticism from outsiders.

While Woodworth-Etter felt that Aimee Semple McPherson's flashy style was too worldly, the founder of Foursquare Church was greatly influenced by Maria's popularity, faith, and breaking of gender barriers.

== Beliefs ==
Early on, Woodworth lacked the confidence in being an evangelist, in part because of the stigma against women preachers at the time. Woodworth studied the Bible and noted all of the times God used women to spread his message and enact His will. She looked at the Biblical stories of Deborah, Huldah, Philip's daughters and others as inspiration to preach. When churches and church leaders opposed her because of her gender, she believed that it contradicted the visions she had following her conversion.

As a continuationist, Woodworth believed that "Signs and Wonders" would follow the Christian church. These included visions, prophecy, tongues, and other Spiritual gifts mentioned in the Bible. Woodworth claimed that she had experienced several of these divine gifts. Over time, Woodworth changed her use of some terms to pair with the growing Pentecostal Movement. Receiving an "Anointing [from the Spirit]" in her work Life, Work and Experience (1894) became "Baptism with the Holy Spirit" in Marvels and Miracles (1922).

In addition to believing in angels and gifts from the Holy Spirit, Woodworth often discussed Satan and demons trying to influence believers, including herself. Prior to accepting her call to ministry, she believed that the Devil wanted her to die. Due to this belief in spiritual conflict, Woodworth warned believers to "try the spirits" in accordance with Paul's letter to the Corinthians. She explained that demons could cause false gifts, such as speaking in tongues from a demon rather than from God, in order to confuse believers and to make Christians ignore divine messages.

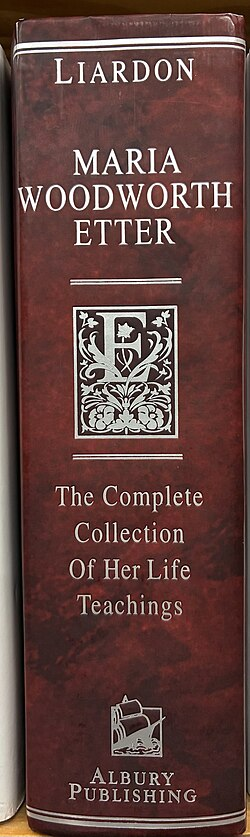
one volume edition of Maria Woodworth Etter's life and teaching

Woodworth's ministry was highly ecumenical from the beginning. While still in Ohio, she attracted members from at least eight different denominations. She was outspoken against doctrinal disputes and was against taking strong doctrinal stances, specifically saying that she was against any "isms."

Having personally seen the damages of alcoholism in her youth, Woodworth was friendly to the temperance movement. She was greatly moved when her congregants testified of the change in their lives after giving up liquor. Woodworth was also strongly influenced by the Holiness movement, which often saw drinking as a gateway to sin.

== Publications ==
- Life, Work, and Experience (1894)
- Signs and wonders God wrought in the ministry for forty years (1916)
- Holy Ghost Sermons (1918)
- Marvels and Miracles (1922)
