= Griffith Hall =

Griffith Hall may refer to:

- The oldest existing building at the University of the Sciences in Philadelphia. Added to the Philadelphia Register of Historic Places in 2024.
- A hall inside the Crozer Building in Philadelphia that was used for public concerts and events from the late 1890s into the 1920s.
