= Frank Miles Day =

American architect (1861-1918)

- Born: April 5, 1861; Philadelphia, Pennsylvania, U.S.
- Died: June 15, 1918 (aged 57)
- Resting place: West Laurel Hill Cemetery, Bala Cynwyd, Pennsylvania, U.S.
- Education: University of Pennsylvania
- Occupations: Architect, editor, educator

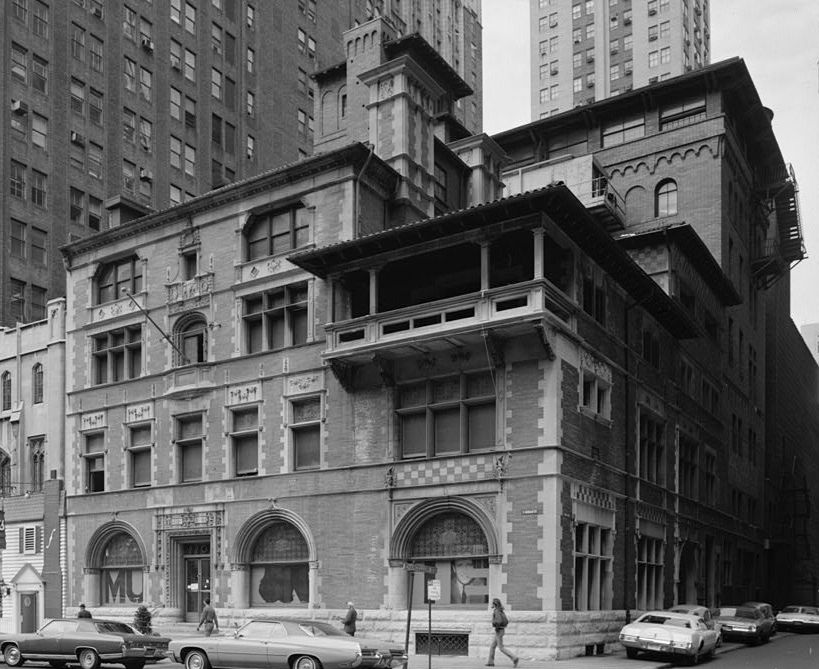
The Art Club of Philadelphia, designed by Day, opened in 1887

Frank Miles Day (April 5, 1861 – June 15, 1918) was an American architect who designed several buildings in Philadelphia, including the Art Club of Philadelphia, the American Baptist Publication Building, and the Wetherill mansion.

Outside of Philadelphia, he also designed several buildings for universities, including those at Cornell University, Johns Hopkins University, New York University, Pennsylvania State University, Princeton University, University of Colorado, University of Delaware, University of Pennsylvania, and Yale University. His university buildings were not designed in the Gothic Revival, Georgian Revival, and Collegiate Gothic, which were then frequently used.

He founded the architectural firm Frank Miles Day & Bro. with his brother and added Charles Zeller Klauder to create the firms Day Bros. & Klauder and Day & Klauder. He lectured on architecture at the University of Pennsylvania from 1890 to 1904. He taught at the Pennsylvania Academy of the Fine Arts, the Pennsylvania Museum and School of Industrial Art, and was a visiting lecturer at Harvard University. He served twice as the president of the American Institute of Architects and was the co-founding editor of House and Garden magazine.

== Early life and education ==
Day was born in Philadelphia, on April 5, 1861, to Charles Day and Anna Rebecca (Miles) Day. He attended the Rittenhouse Academy in Philadelphia but was mainly educated at home by his father. In 1883, he graduated from the Towne School of the University of Pennsylvania as valedictorian and class president. He traveled in Europe and took classes at the Royal College of Art and the Royal Academy of Arts in London. He apprenticed in the atelier of Walter Millard and worked with Basil Champneys.

He received an honorary masters of arts degree from Yale University in 1916 and an honorary doctorate degree from the University of Pennsylvania in 1918.

== Career ==
He worked with George T. Pearson and Addison Hutton in Philadelphia prior to opening his own office in 1887. He was joined by his brother Henry Kent Day and they founded Frank Miles Day & Bro. in 1893. Charles Zeller Klauder became a partner in 1911, and the firm name was changed to Day Brothers & Klauder. From 1912 to 1927, even after Day's 1918 death, the firm was known as Day & Klauder.

He was responsible for several commissions in Philadelphia including the Art Club of Philadelphia in 1888, the American Baptist Publication Society building in 1896, the Free Museum of Science and Art at the University of Pennsylvania, and the Wetherill mansion. He designed numerous buildings for universities including at Cornell University, Johns Hopkins University, New York University, Pennsylvania State University, Princeton University, University of Colorado, University of Delaware, University of Pennsylvania, Wellesley College, and Yale University. The collegiate work did not favor one architectural style and Gothic Revival, Georgian Revival, and Collegiate Gothic were frequently used. Day's 1917 master plan for the University of Delaware was inspired by Thomas Jefferson's plan for the University of Virginia.

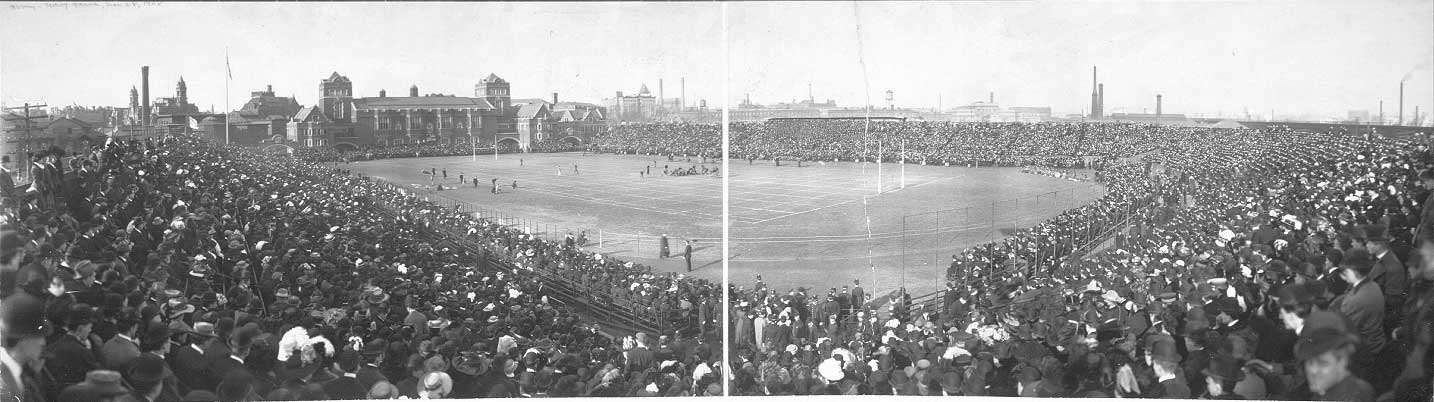
Franklin Field and Weightman Hall at the University of Pennsylvania during the November 28, 1908 Army–Navy Game, designed by Day and built in 1903

Day was a lecturer in architecture at the University of Pennsylvania from 1890 to 1904. He taught at the Pennsylvania Academy of the Fine Arts, the Pennsylvania Museum and School of Industrial Art, and was a visiting lecturer at Harvard University.

He was elected to the American Philosophical Society in 1899. Day was national president of the American Institute of Architects twice and a member of the Imperial Society of Russian Architects, the National Academy of Design, the National Institute of Arts and Letters, and the Royal Institute of British Architects. He was a co-founding editor of House & Garden magazine along with Wilson Eyre and Herbert Clifton Wise. He was a contributing author to American Country Houses of Today, published in 1917.

Day died June 15, 1918, and was interred at West Laurel Hill Cemetery in Bala Cynwyd, Pennsylvania.

== Selected works ==
=== Philadelphia buildings ===
- Tenth Presbyterian Church, 17th and Spruce Street, alterations to existing structure in 1893
- Horticultural Hall, Broad & Spruce St., completed in 1896
- American Baptist Publication Building, 1420-22 Chestnut St., built 1896–99
- C. B. Newbold residence, Locust St.
- Cogslea, the residence of Violet Oakley, 615 St. Georges Rd., built 1904-1906
- Vernon Park Branch, Free Library of Philadelphia, 5708 Germantown Ave., built 1906
- Wetherill mansion, 220 S. Broad St., built 1909

=== University of Pennsylvania ===
- Houston Hall, 3417 Spruce St., designed with William C. Hays and Milton D. Medary, built 1894-1896
- Pedestal of Benjamin Franklin Statue, John J. Boyle sculptor, 3420 Locust Walk, built 1896-1899
- University of Pennsylvania Museum, 3260 South St., designed with Wilson Eyre and Cope & Stewardson, built 1899
- Franklin Field, built 1903-1905
- Weightman Hall, built 1903–1905

=== Princeton University ===
- Dormitory group, undergraduate (Holder and Hamilton Hall, Memorial Tower Dining Hall, Sage Dormitories), built 1908-1913
- Cuyler Hall Dormitories, built 1913
- Madison Hall Dormitories, built 1911

=== Pennsylvania State University ===
- Stock Pavilion at Penn State University in State College, Pennsylvania, built in 1913
- Liberal Arts Buildings at Penn State University in State College, Pennsylvania, built 1913–37
- Chemical Building at Penn State University in State College, Pennsylvania, built in 1914
- Dairy & Creamery Building, Penn State University in State College, Pennsylvania, built in 1914
- Mining Building at Penn State University in State College, Pennsylvania, built in 1915 and later demolished

=== University of Delaware ===
- Harter Hall Dormitories, Delaware College, Newark, Delaware (1916)
- Wolf Hall Science Building, Delaware College, Newark, Delaware (1917)
- Sussex Hall Dormitories, Delaware College, Newark, Delaware (1917)
- Sigma Phi Epsilon fraternity, Delaware College, Newark, Delaware (1919)

=== Other buildings ===
- Francis W. Kennedy House, West Whiteland Township, Pennsylvania, built 1889
- St. Paul's Church, Lynchburg, Virginia, built 1889-1895
- Madison Public Library (Carnegie Library), 1249 Williamson St. in Madison, Wisconsin, built in 1904-1906, now Grieg Chorus Club
- Tuberculosis Hospital, 4600 Arkansas Ave. NW, Washington, D.C., built in 1908
- Parish House & Rectory, Trinity Episcopal Church, Wilmington, Delaware, built in 1909–10
- Gymnasium, Mercersburg Academy, Mercersburg, Pennsylvania, built in 1911
- Dormitories, Mercersburg Academy, Mercersburg, Pennsylvania, built in 1912
- New Haven Hospital, New Haven, Connecticut, built in 1912 and later expanded by Day & Klauder in 1914-26
- Dormitories at Cornell University in Ithaca, New York, built in 1912–19
- Textile Building, Rhode Island School of Design, Providence, Rhode Island, built in 1914
- Charlton Yarnall residence at Crum Creek Farm (1914) 2600 Wayland Road Berwyn, Pennsylvania, now the offices of Melmark School
- Founders Hall, Wellesley College in Wellesley, Massachusetts, built in 1915
- Sigma Phi Fraternity at Cornell University in Ithaca, New York, built in 1915–16
- Hartford Theological Seminary, Hartford, Connecticut, built in 1915–16
- Lapham Field House, Yale University, New Haven, Connecticut, built in 1917–23
- McCormick Theological Seminary, Chicago, built in 1918
- J. L. Ketterlinus summer home, Bar Harbor, Maine, built in 1896

== Gallery ==
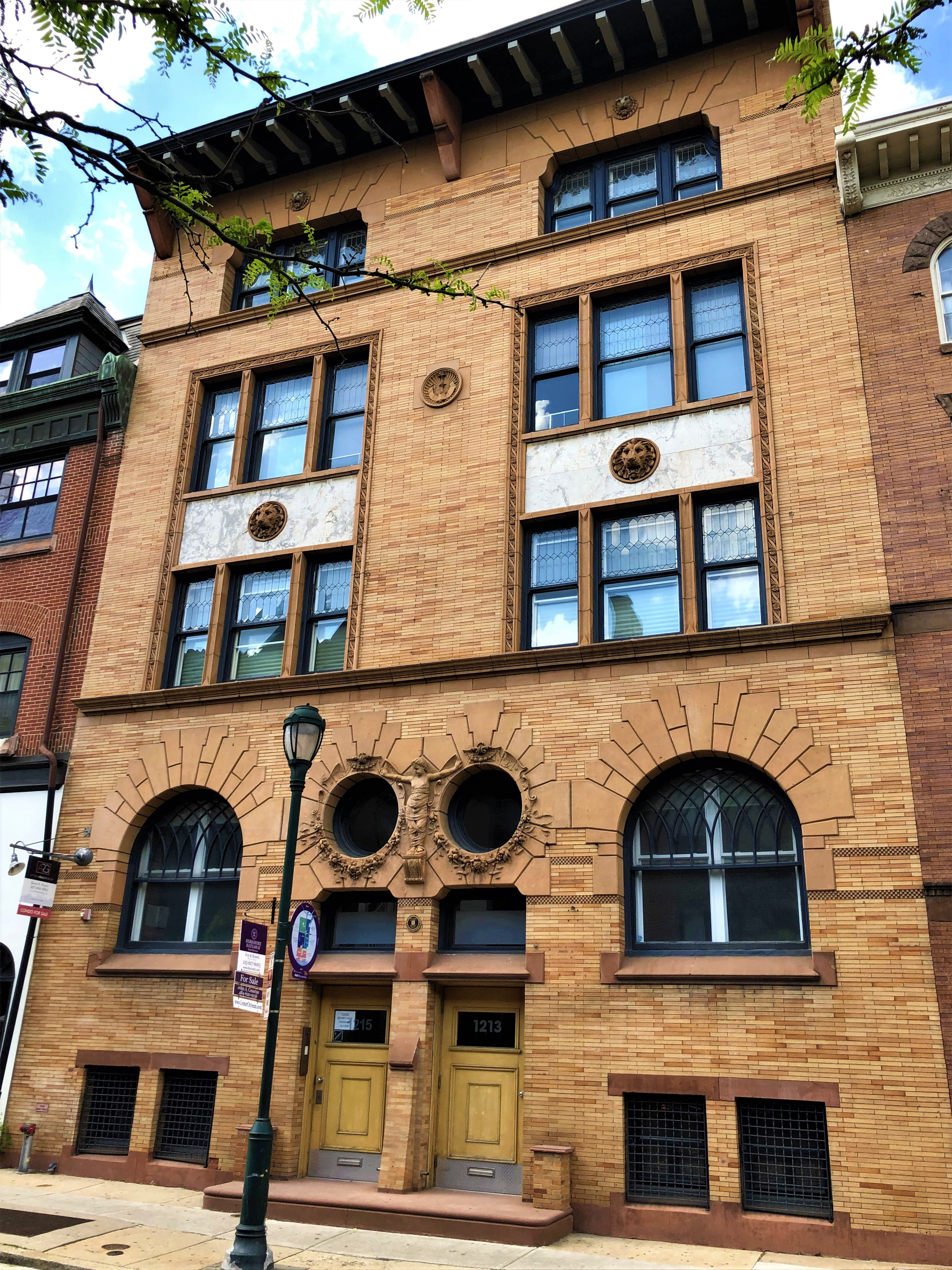
1213-1215 Locust Street in Philadelphia, initially a five-story book store, designed by Day and built in 1892

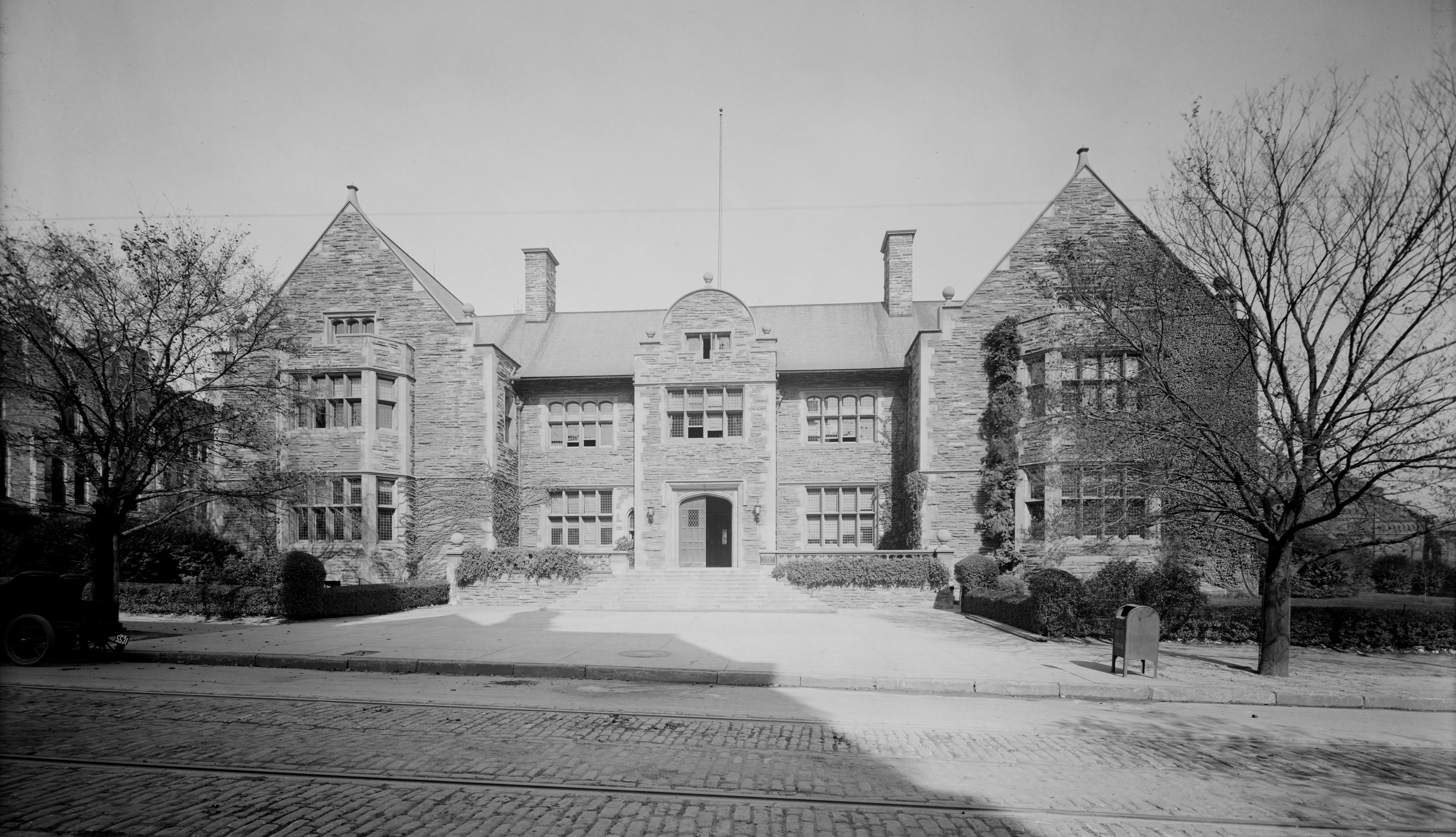
Houston Hall, University of Pennsylvania (1894), with William C. Hays and Milton B. Medary

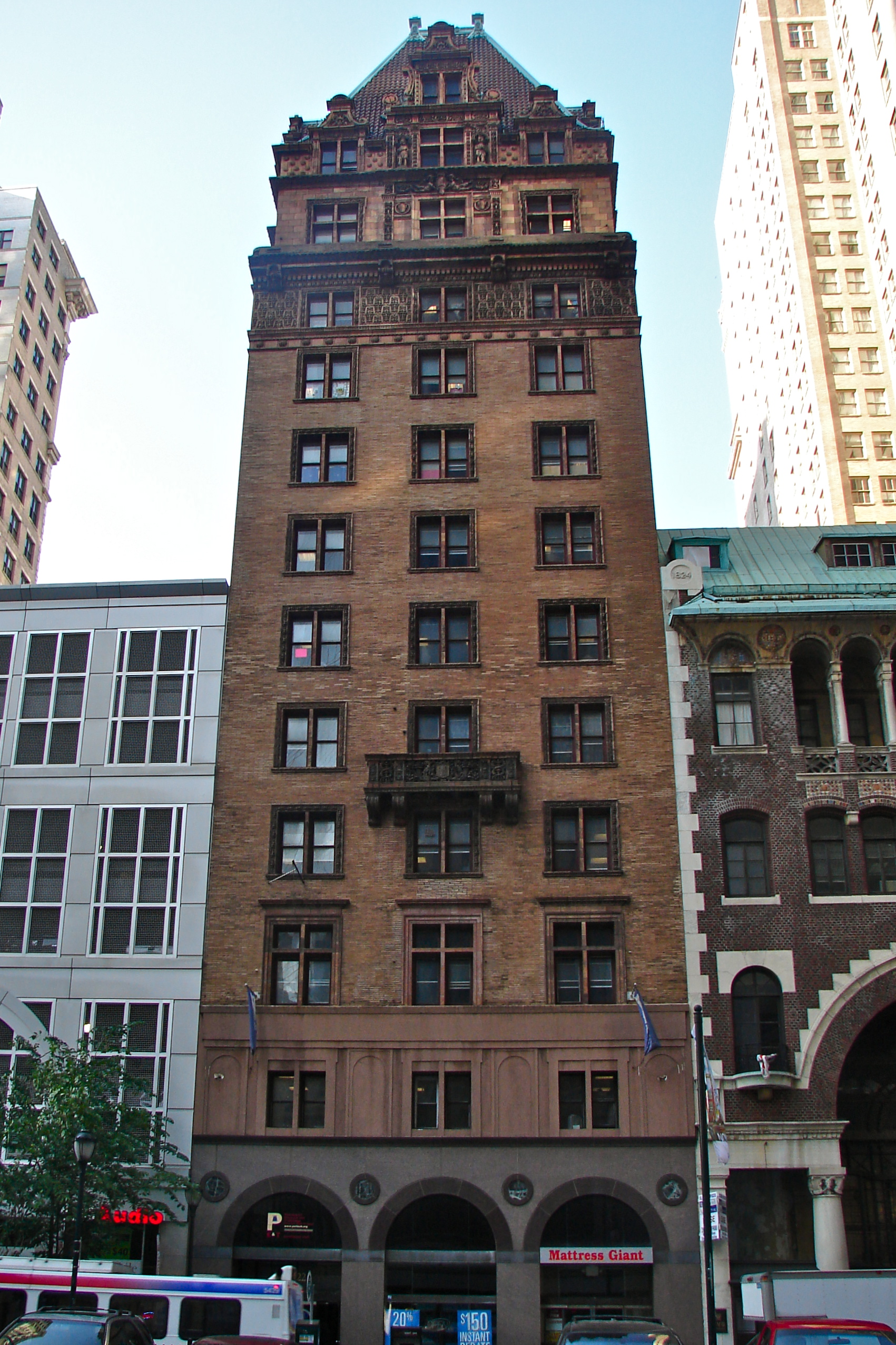
American Baptist Publication Society, Philadelphia (1896–97).

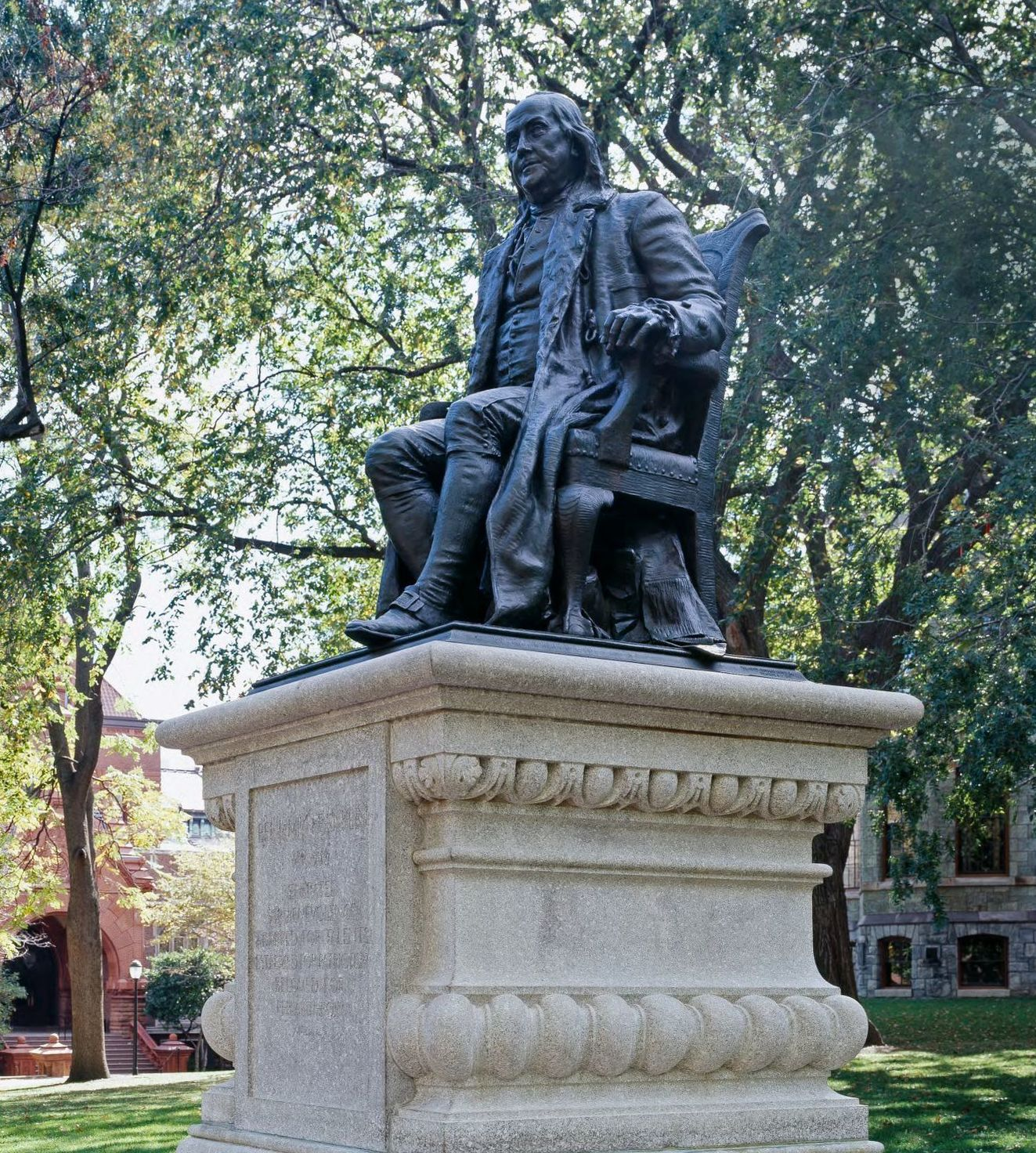
Pedestal, Benjamin Franklin Statue, John J. Boyle, sculptor, University of Pennsylvania (1896–99).

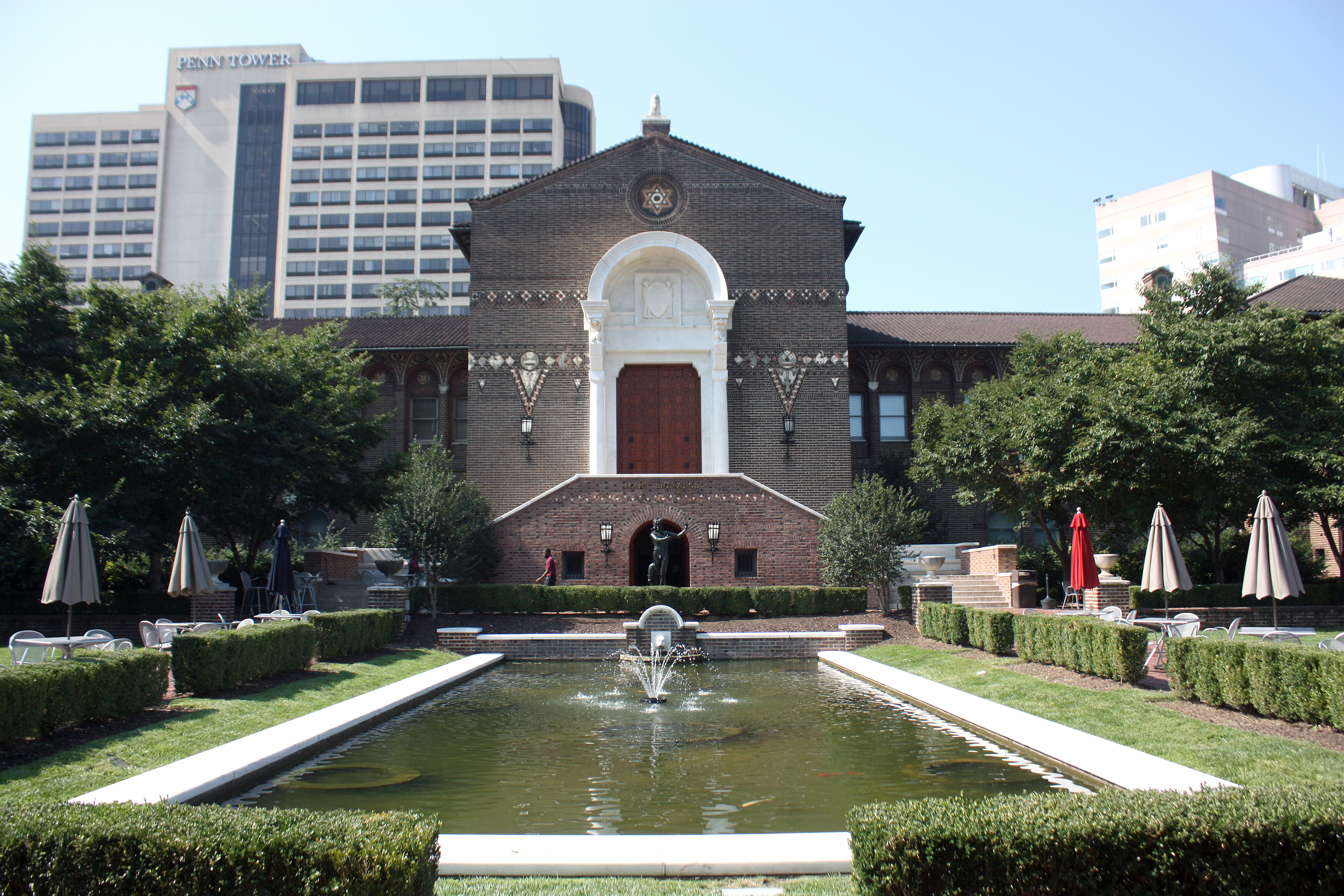
University of Pennsylvania Museum, Philadelphia (1899), with Wilson Eyre and Cope & Stewardson.

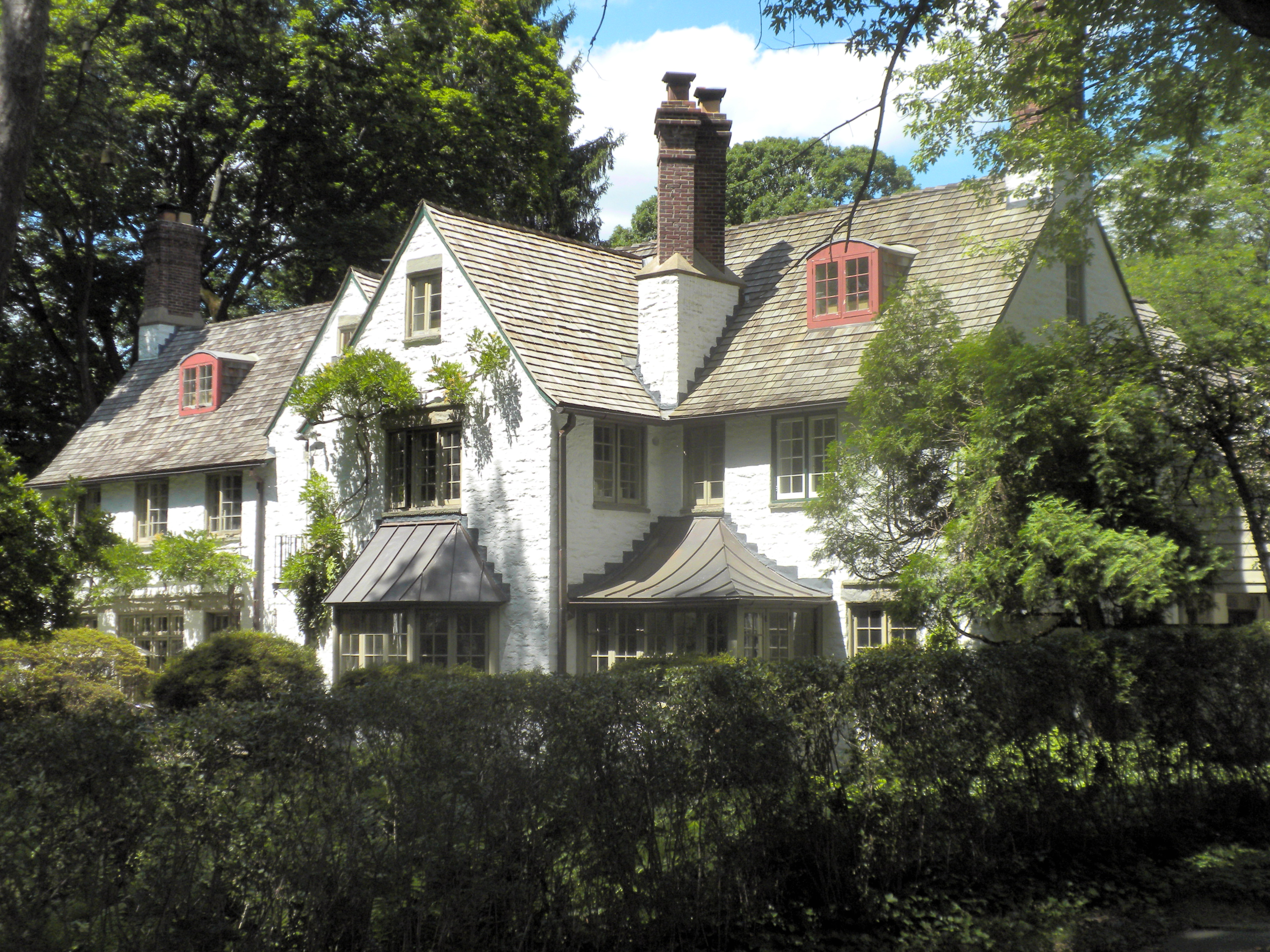
"Cogslea" (Violet Oakley residence & studio), 615 St. Georges Rd., Philadelphia (1902)

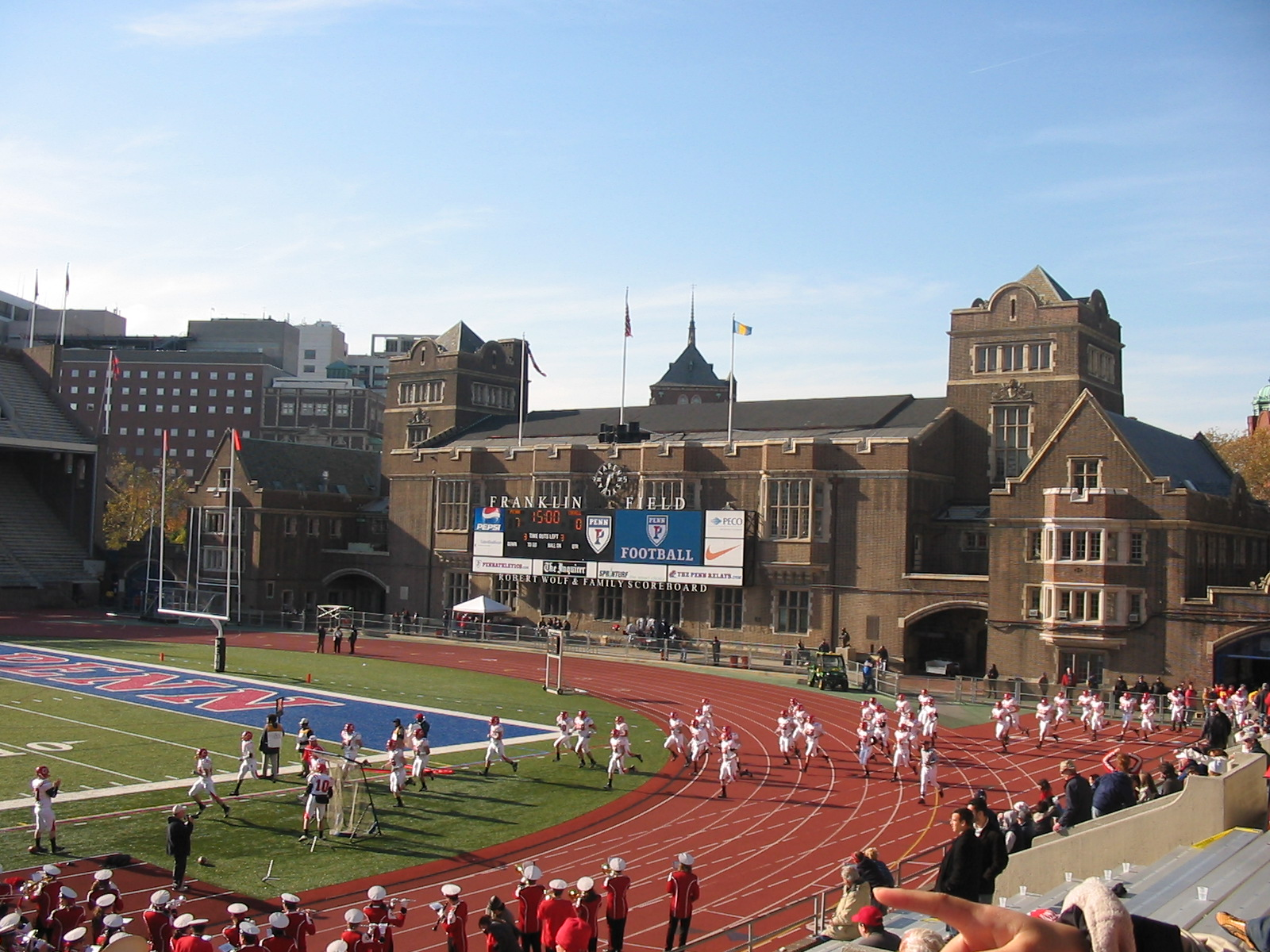
The Fieldhouse (Weightman Hall), Franklin Field, University of Pennsylvania (1903–04)

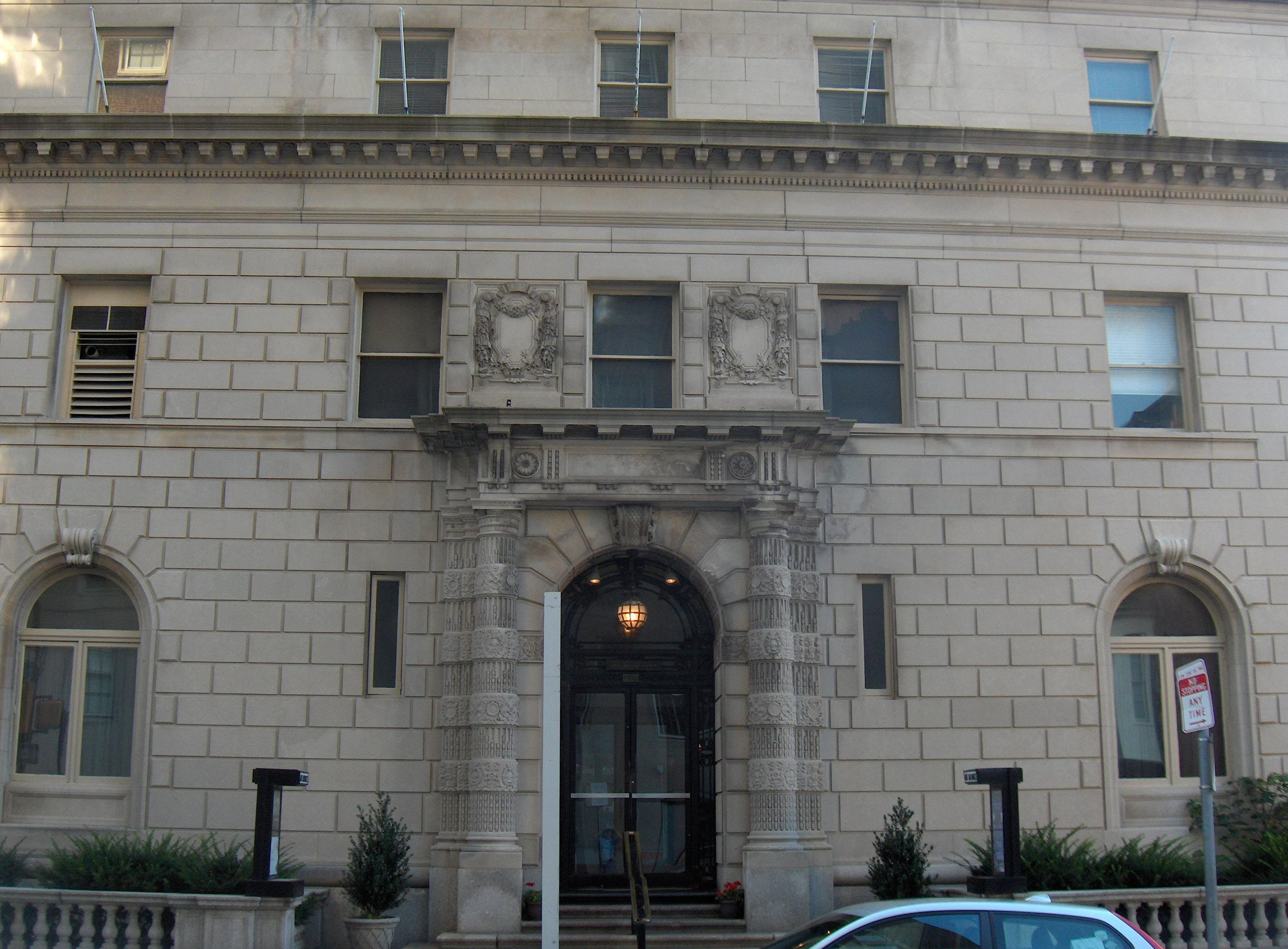
Philadelphia Art Alliance (Samuel P. Wetherill mansion), Philadelphia (1906)

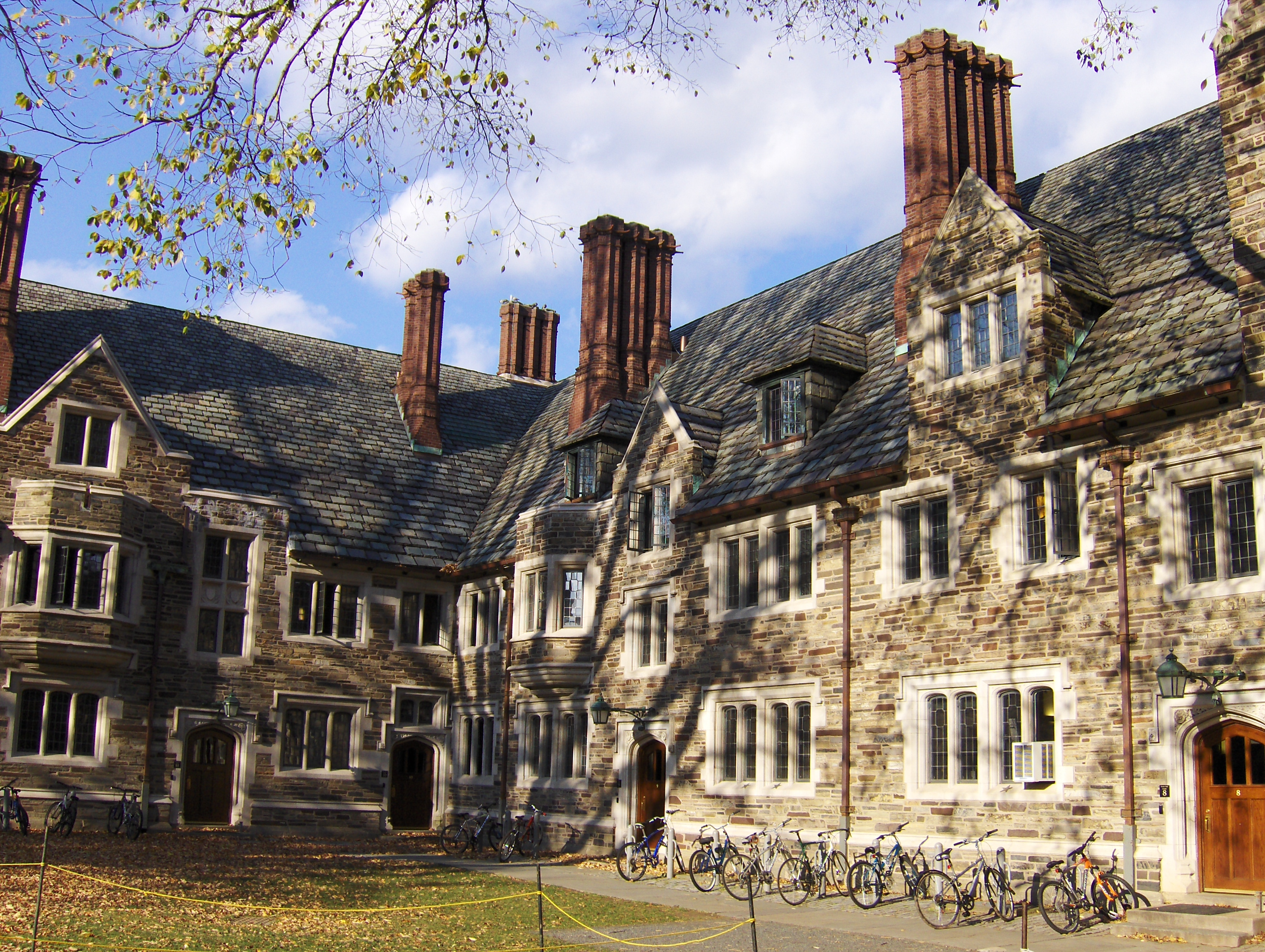
Holder Hall Quadrangle, Princeton University (1909)

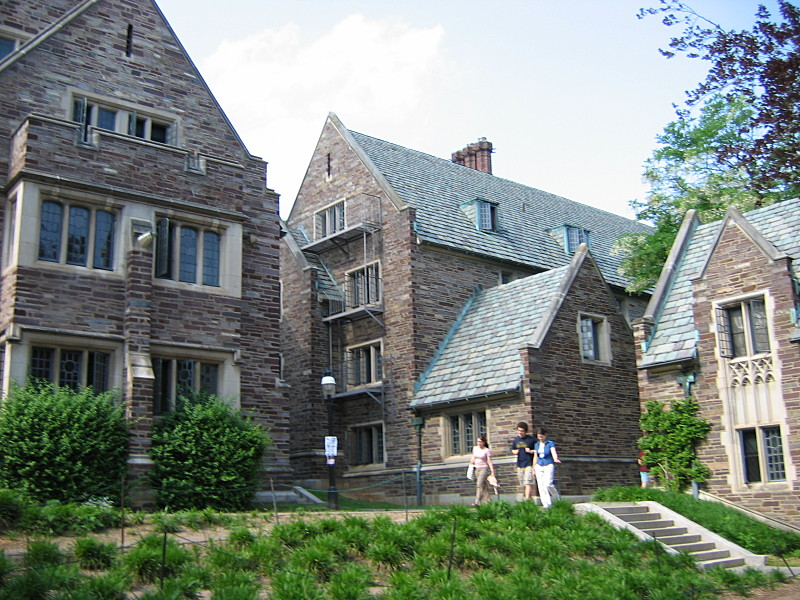
Cuyler Hall Dormitories, Princeton University (1913)

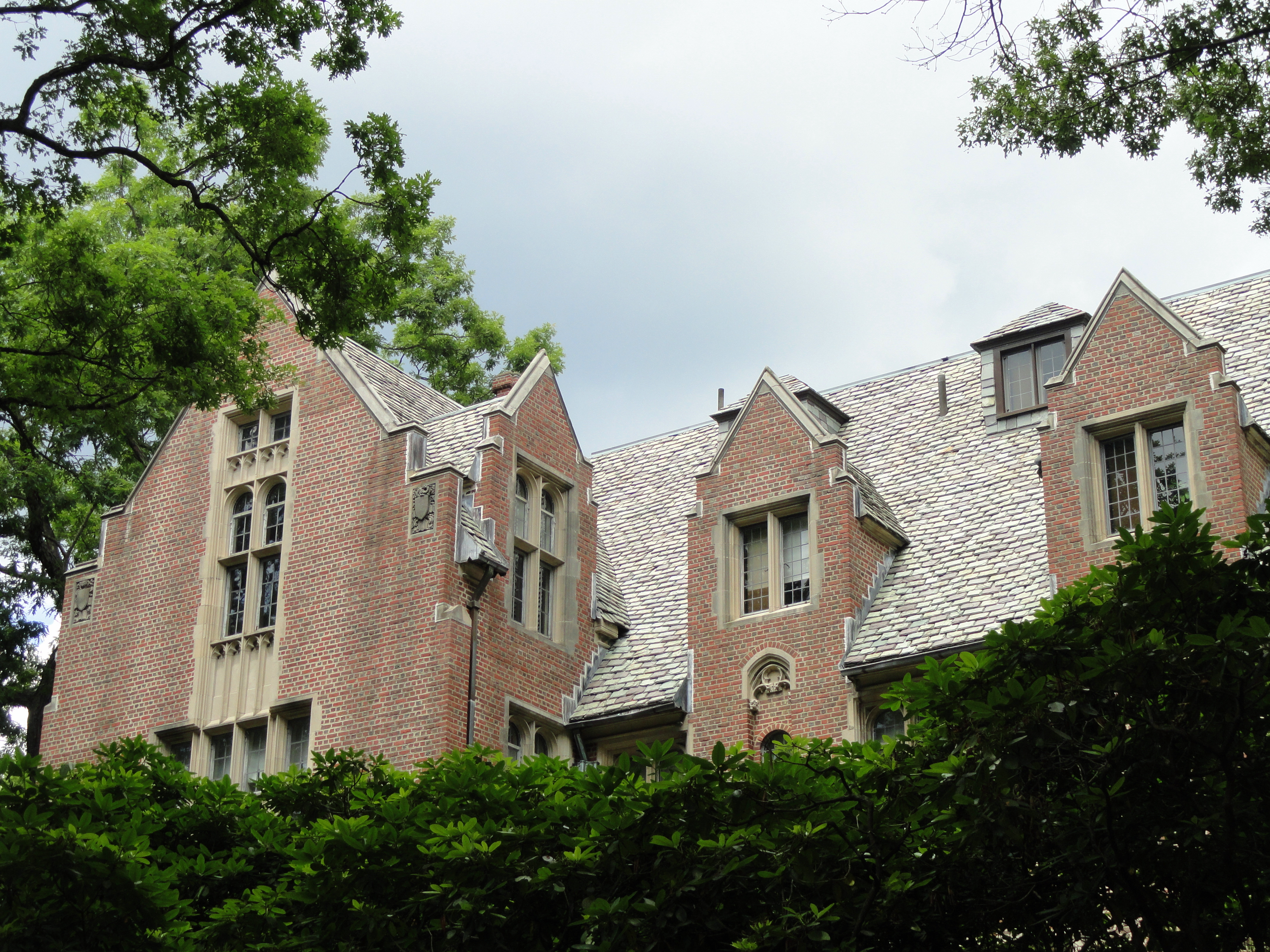
Founders Hall, Wellesley College (1915)

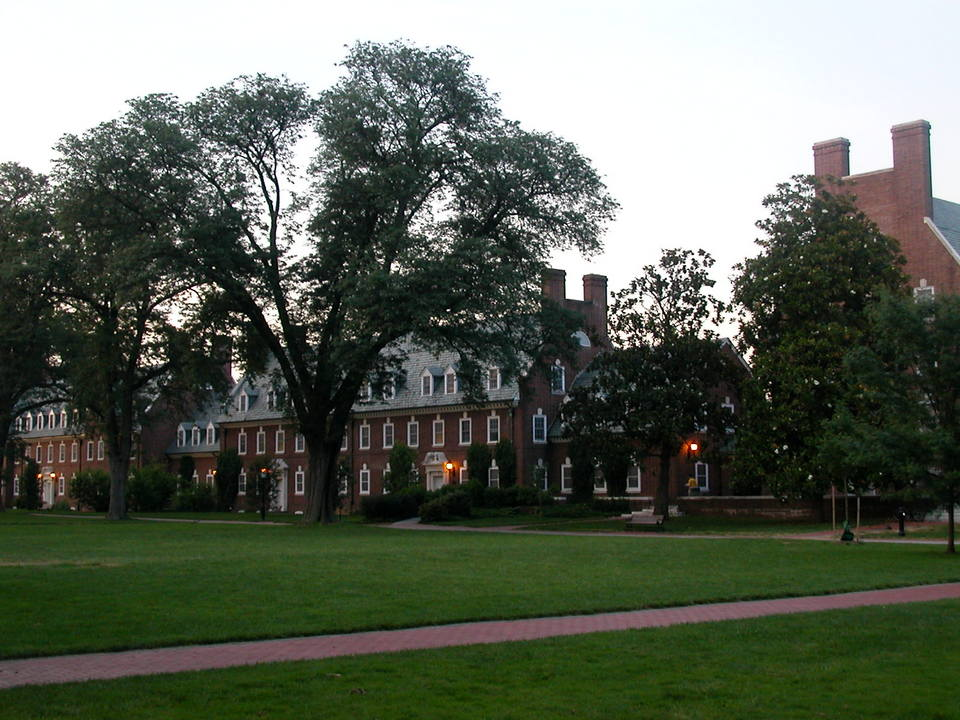
Harter Hall Dormitories, University of Delaware (1916)
