= John Frederick Weishampel =

John Frederick Weishampel (April 4, 1808 – November, 1883) was a Baltimore, Maryland, minister and author. He was the son of Christian Weishampel and was born in Baltimore. He learned the printing business with John T. Hansche; published several newspapers, among which were the Workingmen's Advocate, in support of the ten-hour system and other reforms, and The Experiment, the first daily penny paper issued in Baltimore (1834); removed to Shippensburg, Pa., in 1836, to publish a paper there; removed to Circleville, Ohio, in 1838, to print the "Religious Telescope" for the United Brethren Church; removed to Harrisburg in 1840, and to Shiremanstown, Pa., 1841, to conduct the "Gospel Publisher," organ of the Church of God, by which denomination he was licensed as a minister of the gospel, and preached frequently on circuits and as a missionary in both the English and German languages during his life. He removed in 1843 to Marietta, thence in 1844 to Lancaster, in 1845 to Philadelphia, and thence in 1846 to Baltimore. On July 3, 1831, he married Gertrude Dorothea Koehler, who was born March 20, 1807, in Germany, and came to America when she was eleven years old. She died Feb. 14, 1871, and is buried in Green Mount cemetery, Baltimore. They had six children who reached maturity, viz.: (1) John Frederick Jr., who married Mary E. Addison; (2) Dorothy, who died in infancy; (3) Gertrude Dorothy, who married Robert Westley; (4) Benjamin Franklin, who married Cora I. Richards; (5) Mathilde Otillia, who married Lieut. Edward Francis Foster, First Lieutenant Quartermaster, Maryland Volunteers, Purnell Legion, on Dec. 13, 1864, at Baltimore, Md. (Lieutenant Foster died Sept. 5, 1880, and was interred in the National cemetery at Loudon Park, Baltimore, Md.; Mathilde O. Foster died in Philadelphia, Pa., July 14, 1910; buried in Robertson family lot, "Rose Plill," Loudon Park, Baltimore); (6) Emma Catherine, who married Dr. Charles E. Quail; (7) Ploward Washington, who died young; and (8) Ploward Burritt, who married Alice M. Uppercue and (second) Lelia Kratts, of Baltimore.

The most notable of his works is The Testimony of a Hundred Witnesses (1858), a compilation which contains one hundred religious testimonies from Christians of different denominations. One of the testimonies in the book was written by "Church of God" (commonly called "Winebrennerians") founder John Winebrenner. The town Weishample, Pennsylvania is supposedly named after Weishampel due to his association with Winebrenner.

Weishampel was a second generation Prussian-American and father of publisher John Frederick Weishampel Jr. He was married to Gertrude Dorothea Koehler on July 3, 1831.
