= Winebrenner Theological Seminary =

Private evangelical Christian seminary in Findlay, Ohio

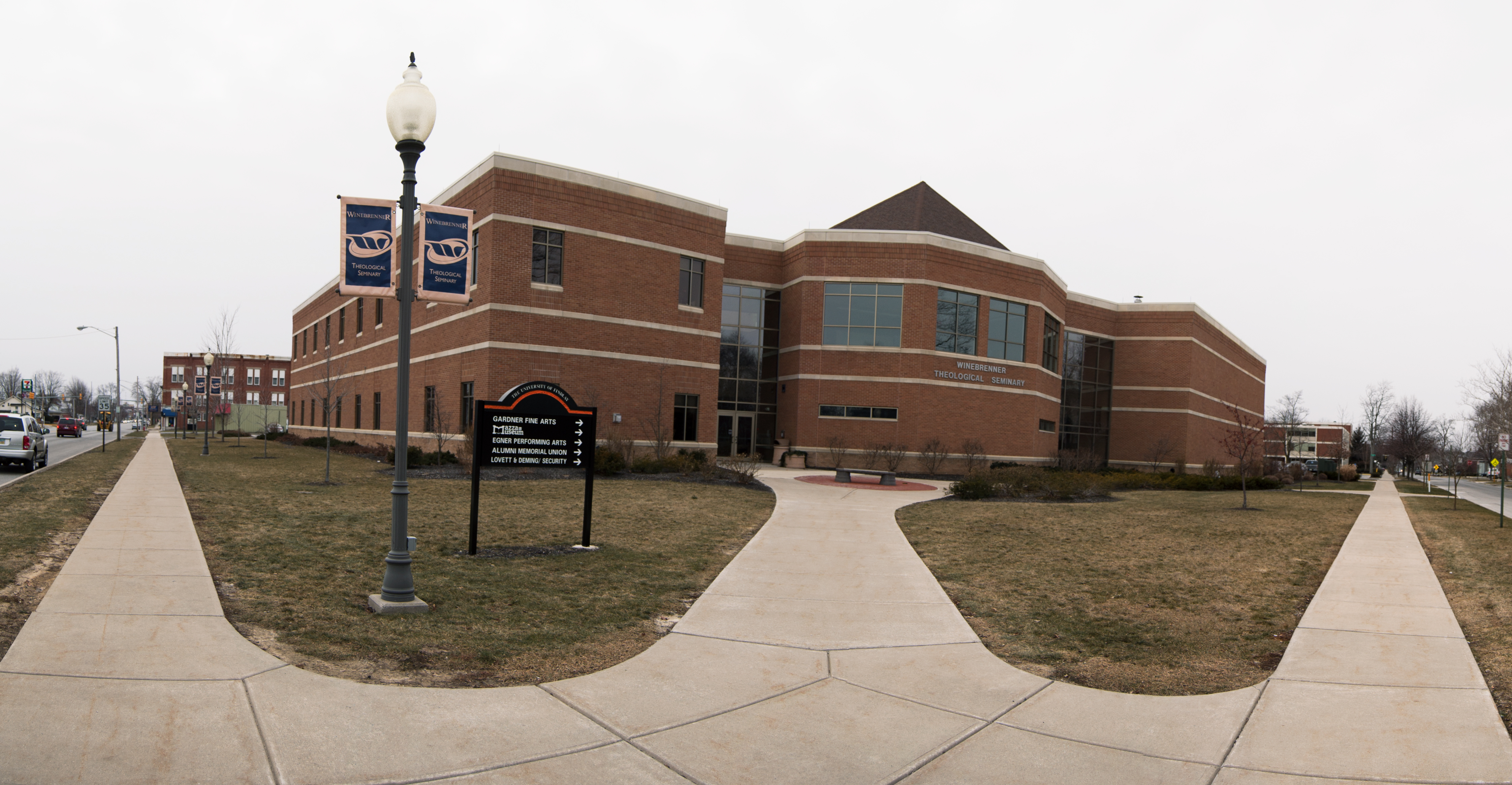
- Motto: χριστω και εκκλησια (To Christ and to Church)
- Type: Private
- Established: 1942
- Religious affiliation: Churches of God General Conference
- President: Brent C. Sleasman
- Students: 127
- Location: Findlay, Ohio, United States; 41°03′09″N 83°39′02″W
- Colors: Blue and Red
- Website: winebrenner.edu

Winebrenner Theological Seminary (WTS) is a private evangelical Christian seminary located in Findlay, Ohio and associated with the Churches of God, General Conference (CGGC). It was established in 1942 as a graduate school of theology of Findlay College (renamed The University of Findlay in 1989) and received its charter from the state of Ohio to become an independent, degree-granting institution in 1961. The seminary derives its name from the founder of the denomination, John Winebrenner, who established the group in 1830 in Harrisburg, Pennsylvania.

WTS continues to serve the CGGC as its sole seminary in addition to students from at least 35 different other denominational backgrounds.

Winebrenner offers three masters programs: a Master of Divinity (MDiv), a Master of Arts in Practical Theology (MAPT), and a Master of Arts in Clinical Counseling (MACC) program. Winebrenner Seminary also offers a Doctor of Ministry (DMin) program and an Institute of Christian Studies (ICS).

== Accreditation ==
Winebrenner Theological Seminary is accredited by The Association of Theological Schools in the United States and Canada (ATS), the Higher Learning Commission (HLC), and the Council for Accreditation of Counseling and Related Educational Programs (CACREP). Winebrenner is chartered by the State of Ohio and has received a Certificate of Authorization from the Ohio Department of Higher Education.
