= American Baptist Publication Society =

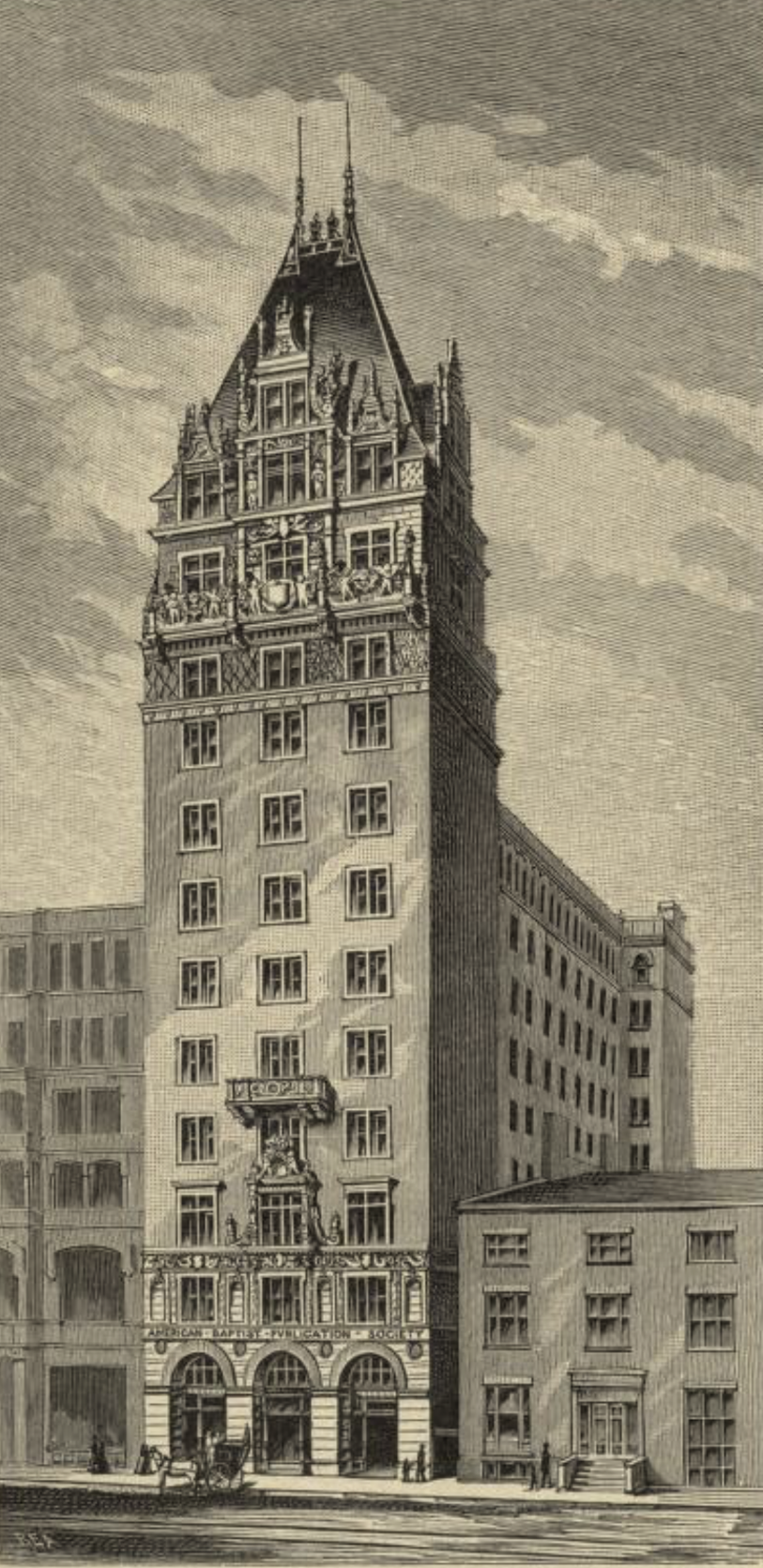
c. 1899 sketch of the Crozer Building in Philadelphia. The Crozer Building served as the headquarters of the American Baptist Publication Society.

The American Baptist Publication Society is a Christian non-profit organization established by the Baptist Church in the United States that worked independently from both the American Baptist Home Mission Society and the Triennial Convention. Established as the Baptist General Tract Society in Washington D.C. in 1824, the organization moved to Philadelphia in 1827. It was re-named the American Baptist Publication and Sunday School Society in 1840, and then re-named again to simply the American Baptist Publication Society in 1844. The society serviced both the Triennial Convention, which it was tied to, and the Southern Baptist Convention, after its foundation in 1845, until 1897 when the SBC severed ties with the society. With the reorganization of the Triennial Convention into the Northern Baptist Convention (nowadays called American Baptist Churches USA) in 1907, it became a part of the organization. It remained in operation until 1944, when the American Baptist Churches was restructured. At this time it was merged into the American Baptist Board of Education and Publication. It is now called the Judson Press.

At one time the American Baptist Publication Society (ABPS) was a "major religious publishing house in America". While essentially a Baptist organization, it was not a sectarian institution. The ABPS had three separate departments. The first was a publishing department responsible for publishing of Baptist literature such as books, pamphlets, journals, and tracts. The second was a missionary department that provided Christian resources for Sunday School, evangelism, and other kinds of Christian education and missionary endeavors. It also had its own missionary staff and projects active in evangelical ministry. The final department was the Bible department which was dedicated to printing and distributing Bibles.

== History ==
The American Baptist Publication Society was founded in Washington, D.C. in February 1824 as the Baptist General Tract Society by a group of baptists, among them preacher Luther Rice. Others who played an instrumental role in its establishment included Baptist minister Noah Davis, James D. Knowles, the editor of Colombian Star, and George Wood who served as the ABPS's first secretary and whose home hosted the organizations charter meeting. It was an organization independent from the American Baptist Home Mission Society and the Triennial Convention, and was initially established with a focus on Christian education. The society's goal was to use educational means "to disseminate evangelical truth and to articulate sound morals." In 1827 the organization relocated to Philadelphia, and in 1840 it was re-named the American Baptist Publication and Sunday School Society. It became the American Baptist Publication Society (ABPS) in 1844.

The APBS had instrumental role in unifying the Baptist Church in the United States during the 1830s and 1840s. At a time when communication across large geographic distances was challenging, the APBS publications made it possible for the first time to bring unity to both church practices and doctrinal and theological beliefs across the scattered American Baptist churches. This included publishing and distributing the first widely used Baptist hymnal, The Psalmist: a New Collection of Hymns for the Use of the Baptist Churches (1843), and a collected volume of Baptist tracts under the title The Baptist Manual in the 1830s. The society employed a large staff of "missionary colporteurs" who were responsible for distributing and selling their publications to churches and Christian groups across the United States.

As an institution the APBS was largely self funded, paying for most of its operating costs through publication sales. It avoided internal controversy within the Baptist Triennial Convention, and when the Southern Baptist Convention was founded in 1845 over the issue of slavery, the APBS remained silent on the controversy. It continued to provide service to both the Triennial Convention and the newly Southern Baptist Convention following the controversy, and was a widely accepted and utilized service organization by American Baptists of all affiliations into the 1890s. It was one of the main producers of Sunday School literature and materials in the United States during the 19th century.

One of the notable ministries created by the APBS was the "chapel train car" in which the APBS created a "church on wheels" on passenger trains; converting a passenger car into a chapel space to not only proselytize passengers but also provide services to communities along the railroad line, sometimes in small communities who had no Baptist church of their own. These cars had pews, an organ, a pulpit, and contained living quarters for a missionary couple who would run the services on the train. The organization began operating multiple chapel train cars in 1891 with the support of John D. Rockefeller and James B. Colgate. In its first year, this ministry provided church services to 88 communities, with 424 services, and 474 sermons. The first year also saw 400 people were converted, and the initial chapel car ministries to certain communities led to the establishment of four permanent Sunday School programs and the establishment 8 new churches off the railroad cars. One of these churches was the First Baptist Church of Van Nuys, California.

In the 1890s the Southern Baptist Convention began publishing their own materials, and for a period the APBS was still being used but in competition with these other Baptist publishers. In 1897 the APBS's secretary, A. J. Rowland, made a decision to publicly attack these Southern Baptist publishers, and as a result offended prominent members of the Southern Baptist Convention. This led to the APBS no longer being utilized by the Southern Baptist Convention in the Southern United States, and from this point forward the publisher became attached to the Triennial Convention only. This ended the last remaining bridge between the Southern Baptist Convention and the Triennial Convention.

The American Baptist Publication Society adopted the imprint name of Judson Press in 1922, just ahead of the 100th anniversary of its founding. In 1944 the American Baptist Publication Society ceased with the restructuration of the American Baptist Churches in that year. At this time it, along with other existing Baptist ministries, were merged into the American Baptist Board of Education and Publication. That organization in turn became the American Baptist Education Ministries under the Board of Education and Publication of the American Baptist Churches USA in 1973.

Today, Judson Press continues operation as a ministry of the American Baptist Home Mission Societies. Judson Press publishes trade books focusing on church leadership, faith formation, history, and more. They also publish an adult Sunday School curriculum titled Journeys and a daily devotional titled The Secret Place every quarterly.
