= Weishample, Pennsylvania =

Unincorporated community in Pennsylvania, US

Weishample
- Unincorporated community
- Location within the U.S. state of Pennsylvania Weishample (the United States)
- Coordinates: 40°41′37″N 76°26′46″W
- Country: United States
- State: Pennsylvania
- County: Schuylkill
- Time zone: UTC-5 (Eastern (EST))
  - Summer (DST): UTC-4 (EDT)
- ZIP code: 17938
- Area code: 570

Weishample is a community in Barry Township, Schuylkill County in the U.S. state of Pennsylvania, about 20 miles northeast of Harrisburg.

The town is supposedly named after Rev. John Frederick Weishampel due to his association with John Winebrenner.
