= Francis W. Kennedy House =

Historic house in Pennsylvania, United States

- U.S. National Register of Historic Places
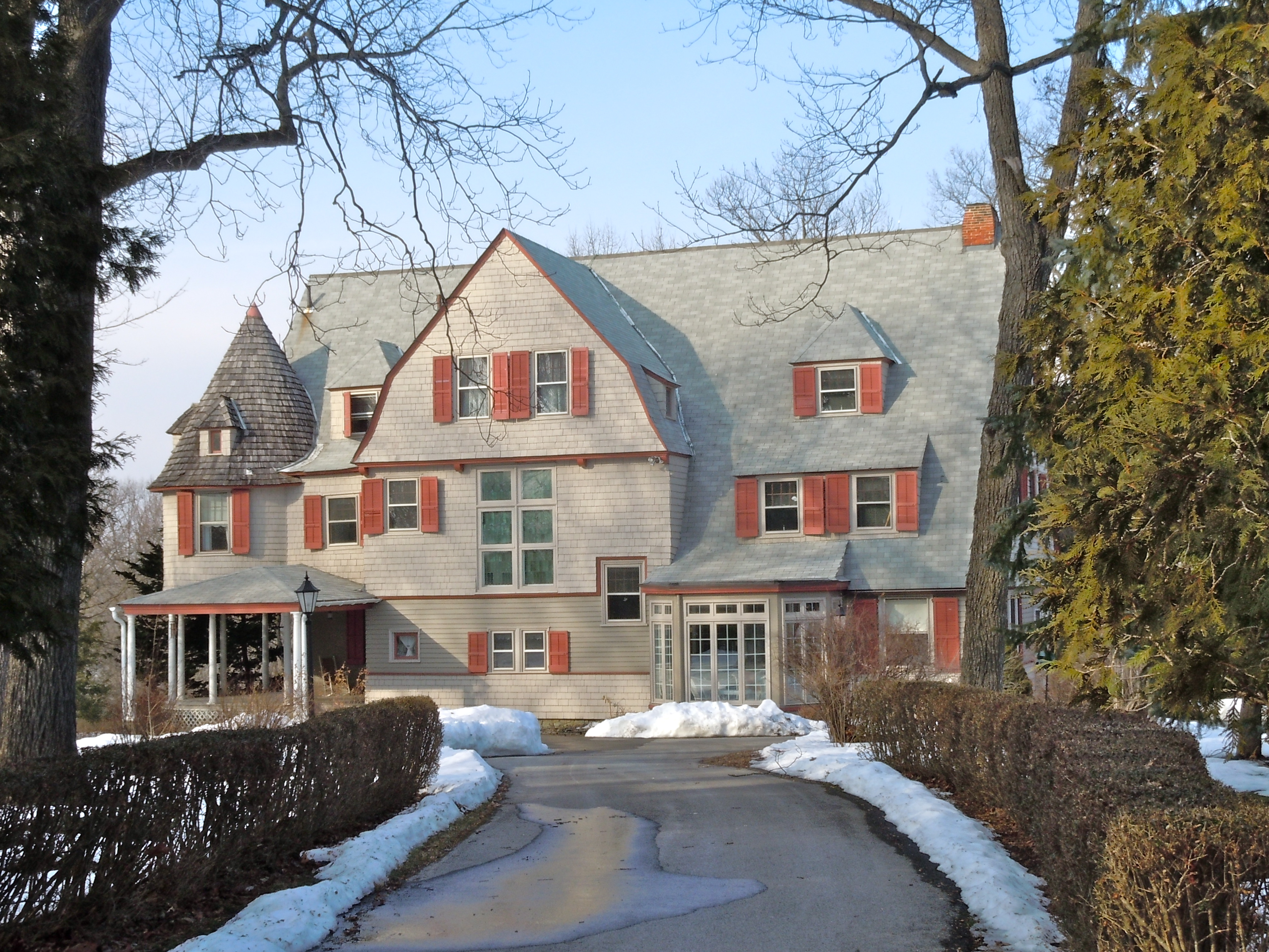
- Francis W. Kennedy House, February 2011

- Location within Pennsylvania Location within the United States
- Location: 4717 Highland Ave., West Whiteland Township, Pennsylvania
- Coordinates: 40°0′20″N 75°39′18″W
- Area: 5.8 acres (2.3 ha)
- Built: 1889
- Architect: Day, Frank Miles
- Architectural style: Shingle Style
- MPS: West Whiteland Township MRA
- NRHP reference No.: 84003277
- Added to NRHP: August 2, 1984

Francis W. Kennedy House is a historic home located in West Whiteland Township, Chester County, Pennsylvania. It was designed by noted Philadelphia architect Frank Miles Day (1861–1918) and built in 1889. It is a 2 1/2-story, Shingle Style dwelling. It features a gambrel roof, projecting bays and dormers, a corner turret, and porches.

It was listed on the National Register of Historic Places in 1984.
