= Crozer Building =

Office building in Philadelphia, Pennsylvania

- U.S. National Register of Historic Places
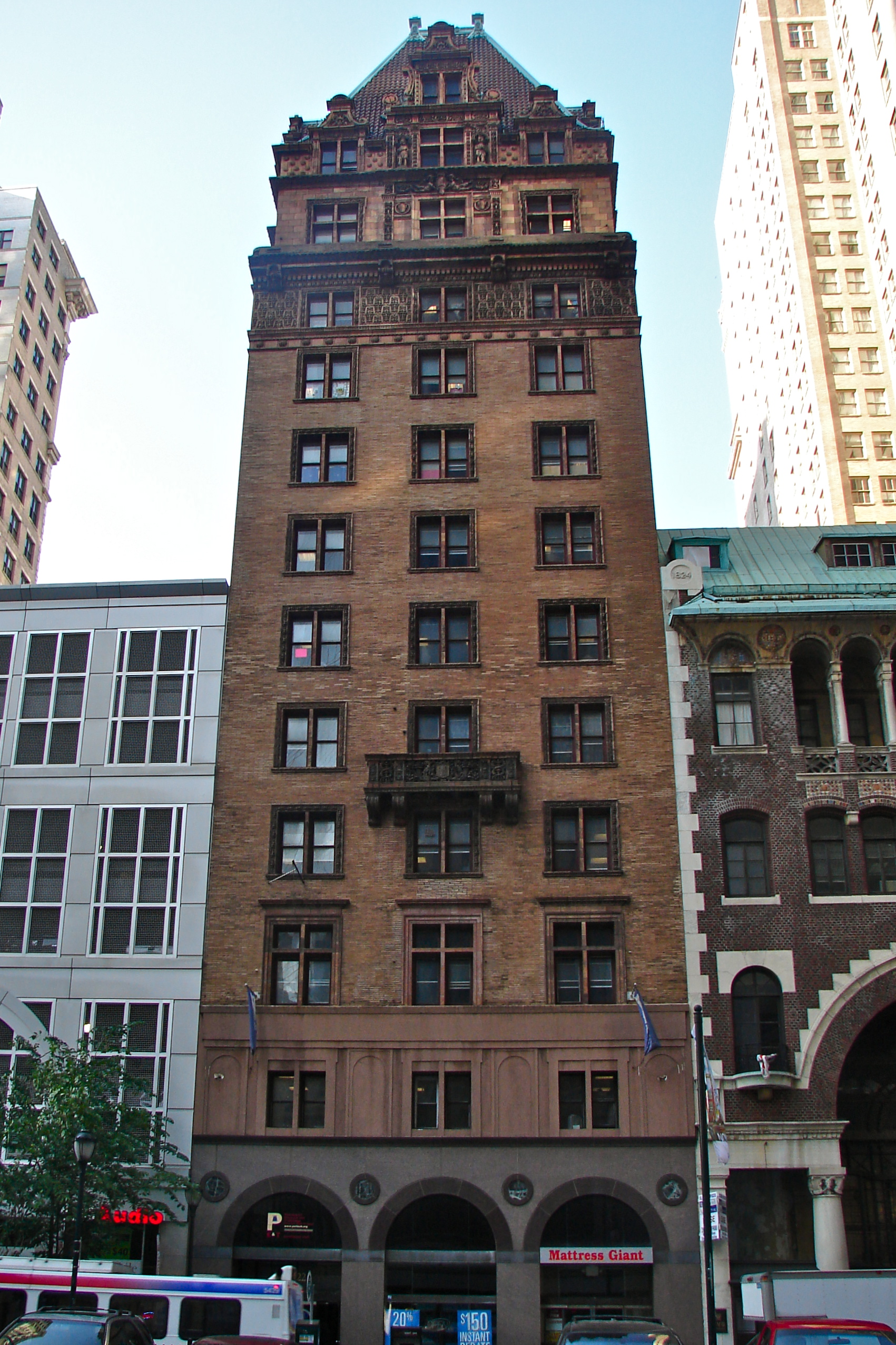
- The Crozer Building in Philadelphia in June 2011

- Location within Philadelphia Location within Pennsylvania Location within the United States
- Location: 1420–1422 Chestnut St., Philadelphia, Pennsylvania, U.S.
- Coordinates: 39°57′3″N 75°9′55″W
- Area: 0.3 acres (0.12 ha)
- Built: 1896-1898
- Architect: Frank Miles Day & Bro.; Payne, George W. & Bro.
- Architectural style: Renaissance, French Renaissance
- NRHP reference No.: 80003607
- Added to NRHP: June 27, 1980

The Crozer Building is a historic building at 1420–1422 Chestnut Street in Philadelphia, Pennsylvania. It was built as the headquarters of the American Baptist Publication Society, and is sometimes called the American Baptist Publication Society building.

== History ==
On February 2, 1896, a disastrous fire razed the headquarters of the American Baptist Publication Society (ABPS) at 1420–1422 Chestnut Street in Philadelphia, Pennsylvania. In addition to destroying much of the property, records, and library of the ABPS, it also destroyed the archives of the American Baptist Historical Society which shared the ABPS's building. In the same year of that fire, the ABPS began construction of a new headquarters building on the same site. The new building, the Crozer Building, was named after the Crozer family, a prominent Baptist family who had a long history with the ABPS. One member of the family, Samuel Aldrich Crozer, served a term as the ABPS's president.

The Crozer Building was designed by the architectural firm of Frank Miles Day & Brother. It used a French Renaissance Revival style. After two years of construction, the new building officially opened in 1898. Part of the building was occupied earlier, with the ABHS moving into the new facility on November 17, 1897 before construction had been completed. The building was given a formal grand opening on February 17, 1898.

Along with Jacob Reed's Sons Store to the immediate west and the Packard Building on 15th Street, the building set the standard for commercial buildings on fashionable Chestnut Street. The Crozer Building included Griffith Hall, named for Dr. Benjamin Griffith, which was used as a place for public music concerts and other events from the 1890s through the 1920s.

In 1980, in recognition of its significance as a national historical structure, it was added to the National Register of Historic Places.
