= Noah Davis (Baptist minister) =

American minister (1804–1867)

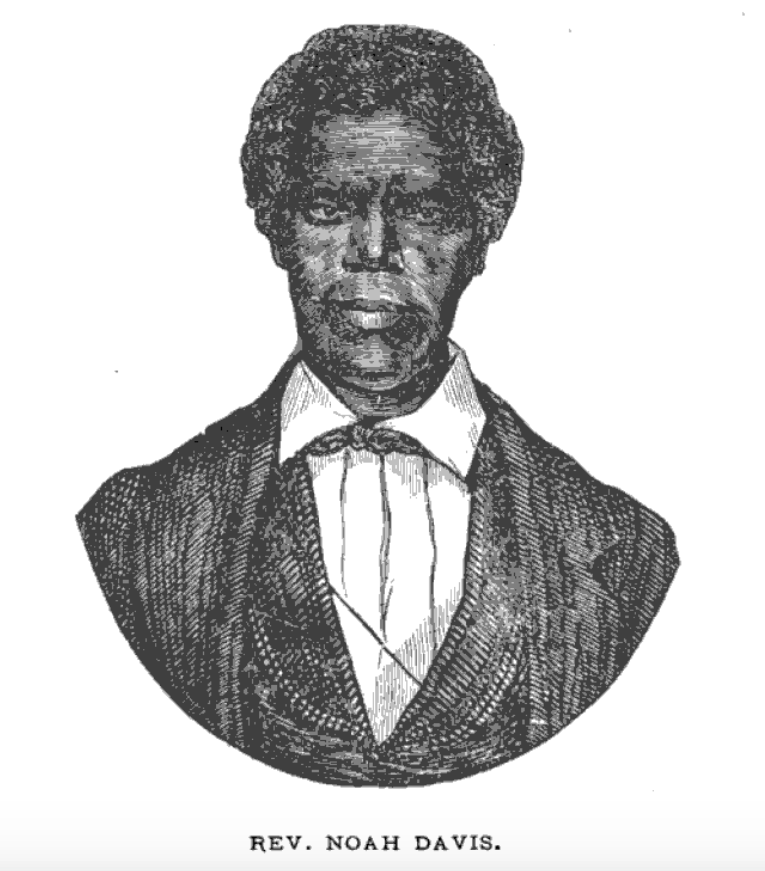

Noah Davis (March 1804–April 7, 1867) was a Baptist minister, who was a former enslaved person that purchased his and his family members' freedom. He established the Second Colored Baptist Church in Baltimore. He spoke at lectures in the north and published A Narrative of the Life of Rev. Noah Davis, a Colored Man to raise money to free his wife and children.

== Early life ==
Noah Davis was born in March 1804 in Madison County, Virginia. He was born into slavery. His parents were Jane Davis and John Davis, who was a head miller, a coveted position. Robert Patten, the family's enslaver, owned a large mill near Fredericksburg. Davis said Patten was generous and his father "enjoyed many more privileges than many others". By the time he was twelve years old, he decided that he wanted to be as good as his parents, who were devout Baptists.

His parents were manumitted in 1816, after his enslaver sold the mill. He also let them live on his property in Culpeper County. Davis, who remained enslaved, learned carpentry and farming. He was hired out as a carpenter, which meant that he worked for someone for a specified period of time, and his enslaver would get paid for his work. His parents farmed the land. In December 1818, he became an apprentice shoemaker for Thomas Wright in Fredericksburg. He learned to read and write. He fell into some bad habits in the city, but at the same time he continued to study the Bible.

== Ministry ==
He became a member of the Fredericksburg Baptist Church, which had about 300 African American members. He was baptized on September 19, 1831. He was elected deacon and was licensed to preach by white church officials. He initially preached at a plantation.

...some few others were able to gain their freedom by purchasing themselves.

— Walter Johnson, Soul by Soul

Davis spoke at lectures in the north and worked as a shoemaker to raise money to purchase his freedom beginning in 1845. His enslaver allowed Davis to travel to the north to buy his freedom. He did not have the full amount in 1847, when white Baptists of the Southern Baptist Convention gave him the rest of the money. That was part of the agreement when he accepted their offer to work as a missionary. He was ordained and then he went to Baltimore and established the Second Colored Baptist Church.

In 1854, the church received funding for a four-story church with a new name, Saratoga Street African Baptist Church. The construction was completed on February 18, 1855. It had a sanctuary, offices, a Sabbath School and a high school. It was the largest educational facility for African Americans at the time.

He was a black delegate to the American Baptist Missionary Convention in 1863. It was held in Washington, D.C., and, with 11 other black delegates, he met Abraham Lincoln. They successfully petitioned to allow black ministers to be of counsel to African Americans who either fought in the war or were free and behind military lines. In 1866, the church merged into the Union Baptist Church due to financial difficulties as the result of the American Civil War and before that, the Panic of 1857.

== Marriage and children ==
At church, Davis met a woman named Fanney. They married, but because they were both enslaved, it was not legally binding. They had children, who were enslaved as well. He left his family when he went to Baltimore in 1847, when he purchased his freedom.

He purchased Fanney and their two youngest children in 1851. He purchased the freedom of three other children in the 1850s, before they could be sold and possibly taken outside of Virginia. He raised money by performing lectures in northern cities. He published A Narrative of the Life of Rev. Noah Davis, a Colored Man as another means to obtain the money needed to free his children. In his memoir, he stated what it was like to live in slavery and that he still had enslaved children. He also discussed his religious conversion. It was published by John Frederick Weishampel Jr. in 1859.

He spent $4,000 (equivalent to $143,333 in 2025) freeing himself, Fanney, and five or seven children. They had two or more children who were born free, after Fanney was freed. In 1860, Noah and Fanney lived together in Baltimore with nine children from 2 years of age to 25. The children were: Arettia, Louisa, Mary, Isabella, Jane, Sarah, Edward, Henry, and Fanney. Fanney, Noah's wife, was a domestic worker and laundress. Davis was ill for at least six years before his death on April 7, 1867, in Baltimore.

== Legacy ==
According to the Encyclopedia of African American Religions: "Davis is remembered as one of a large class of Black leaders whose accomplishments were not so exceptional, but whose work was heroic and meaningful nonetheless."
