= John Frederick Weishampel Jr. =

John Frederick Weishampel Jr. (Baltimore, Maryland, April 22, 1832 – May 5, 1904) was an American printer and publisher based at 484 West Baltimore Street in Baltimore. Weishampel was a third-generation Prussian-American and son of Rev. John Frederick Weishampel.

== Noah Davis ==
In 1859 Weishampel published A Narrative of the Life of Rev. Noah Davis, a Colored Man, a slave narrative and autobiography written by Noah Davis, a Baptist minister who had bought his freedom from slavery. Davis had been born into slavery in Madison County, Virginia and learned various trades. In 1818 he moved to Fredericksburg, where he learned to read and write. In 1831 he was baptized into the Fredericksburg Baptist Church. Davis married a fellow church member and eventually purchased his own freedom using funds raised while working as a missionary in Africa. By 1851, Davis purchased his wife's freedom and continued working in order to purchase the freedom of his several children. He thought to raise money by writing an account of his life, and Weishampel's publication of his work assisted in this effort. From the sales of the book and money raised by himself and his wife, Davis was able to free five of their seven children.

== Personal life ==
Weishampel married Annie Kohl. They had 10 children. He was a member of the Seventh Baptist Church. He later became a member and deacon of the Fulton Avenue Baptist Church.

Weishampel died on May 5, 1904, at his home on Frederick Avenue in Baltimore. He was buried in Green Mount Cemetery.

== Publications ==
- A Narrative of the Life of Rev. Noah Davis, a Colored Man. Written by Himself, at the Age of Fifty-Four. by Noah Davis, published J. F. Weishampel Jr. (1859)
- New and Enlarged Map of Baltimore City. Engraved by E. Sachse & Co. and published by John F. Weishampel Jr., based on surveys by Wm. H. Shipley. (1872)
- History of Baptist Churches in Maryland, 1742 – 1885. by Harvey Johnson (1842–1923), Baltimore: J.F. Weishampel Jr., (1885)
- The Stranger in Baltimore: A New Hand Book Containing a General Description of Baltimore City and its Notable Localities, With Other information Useful to Both Citizens and Strangers. by J. F. Weishampel Jr. (1885)
- Weishampel's Baltimore Guide: The Stranger in Baltimore: a New Hand Nook, Containing a General Description of Baltimore with Other Information (1888)
- The Man Christ Jesus: Character and Purpose of Jesus by J. F. Weishampel Jr. (1894))
- The Pope's Stratagem: "Rome to America!": An address to the Protestants of the United States, against placing the Pope's block of marble in the Washington monument. by J. F. Weishampel Jr. (date unknown)
- Revivals and Revival Measures by J.F. Weishampel Jr. (1860)
