= Churches of God General Conference (Winebrenner) =

Christian denomination in the United States

- Classification: Protestant
- Governance: Presbyterian polity
- Executive Director: Lance Finley
- Headquarters: Findlay, Ohio
- Founder: John Winebrenner
- Origin: 1830
- Congregations: 336 in 2000
- Members: 32,208 in 2000
- Official website: https://cggc.org/

The Churches of God, General Conference (Winebrenner) (CGGC) is an Evangelical Christian denomination in the United States originating in the revivalism and evangelistic efforts of John Winebrenner.

== History ==
John Winebrenner (1797–1860) was ordained on September 28, 1820, as a minister of the German Reformed Church, a Calvinist body. He was given charge of four congregations in the Harrisburg, Pennsylvania, area. Winebrenner labored extensively in revival meetings, but some of the members opposed what they considered "unusual efforts for the conversion of sinners." In 1828 the General Synod of the German Reformed Church dropped him from its roster of ministers, in response to such complaints. In July 1830, Winebrenner was rebaptized by immersion by Jacob Erb. That year, he and co-laborers sympathetic with his efforts met and organized the General Eldership of the Church of God. Representatives from various denominations were present, and the new organization reflected that diversity.

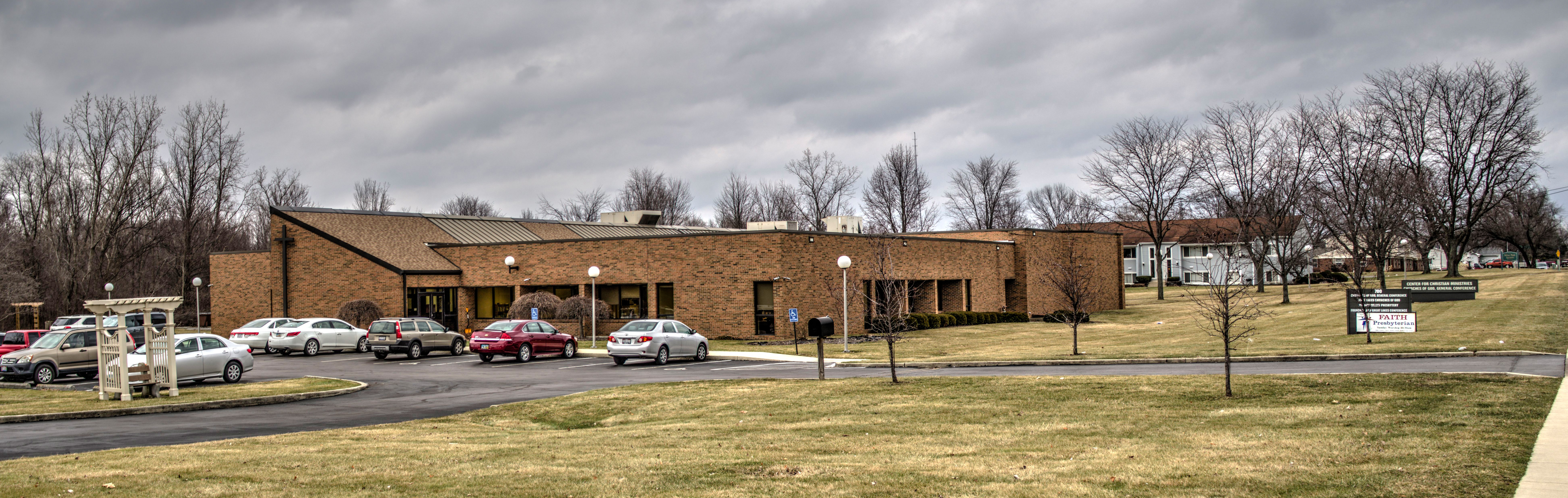
Churches of God General Conference (Winebrenner) Headquarters - Findlay, Ohio, 2016

In the early years of the Church of God, its members were popularly called Winebrennerians, after their founder. The official name was changed to the General Eldership of the Churches of God in North America in 1845, and to its present title in 1975.

The church reported 336 congregations with 32,208 members in 2000, principally in Pennsylvania and the Midwest.

== Organization and theology ==
The basic theology of the Churches of God is Arminian, conservative, and Evangelical. The church observes three ordinances: baptism by immersion, the Lord's Supper (taken in the evening, while seated), and feet washing. The Bible is the church's only rule of faith and practice.

The CGGC has a presbyterian polity. The church is divided into regional conferences, with headquarters in Findlay, Ohio. The church operates Winebrenner Theological Seminary on the University of Findlay campus. The Global Advocate is the CGGC's official periodical, published bi-monthly by the church.

There are seven regional organizations in the Churches of God-USA. These are the Allegheny Region, Eastern Regional Conference, California Eldership, Great Lakes Conference, Mid-South Conference, Midwest Region, and Western Region.

Around the world the CGGC also has established conferences in Bangladesh (1898), Brazil (1999), Haiti (1967), India (1898), Kenya (2011), Venezuela (2012), and emerging works in the Dominican Republic, Sweden, and Thailand.
