= John Winebrenner =

Christian pastor and author (1797–1860)

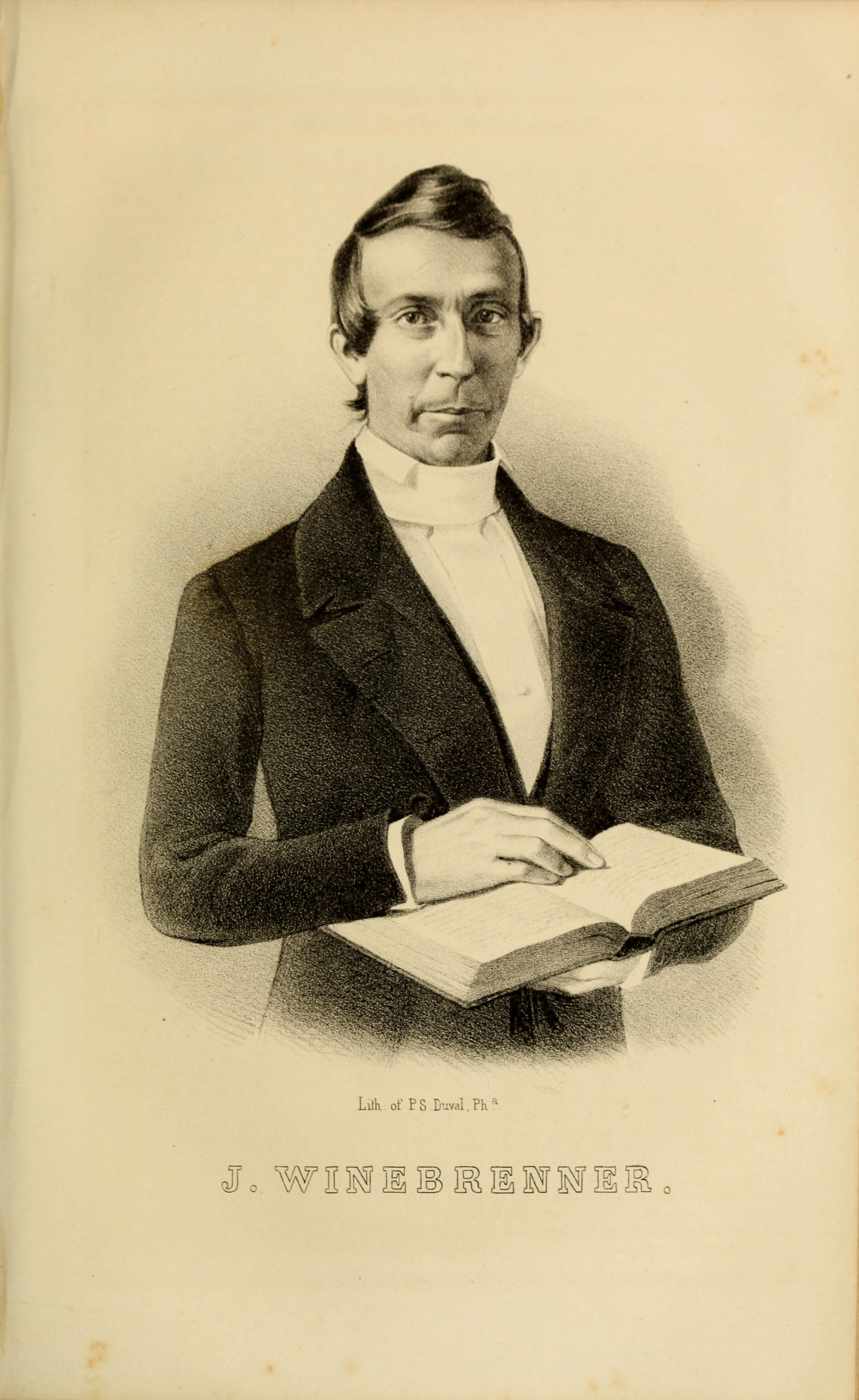
- Portrait of Winebrenner in 1849

Personal life
- Born: March 25, 1797
- Died: September 11, 1860 (aged 63)
- Education: Dickinson College
- Known for: Founding the Church of God

Religious life
- Religion: Christianity
- Denomination: Church of God
- Church: General Eldership of the Church of God

John Winebrenner (March 25, 1797 – September 11, 1860) was a Christian pastor, author and religious reformer who founded the Churches of God General Conference.

== Life ==
Winebrenner was born in Walkersville, Maryland. He studied at Dickinson College, Carlisle, Pennsylvania, and was ordained in the German Reformed Church in 1820. He pastored at Harrisburg, Pennsylvania, where his revival preaching and his Revival Hymn-Book (1825) brought about a break between his followers and the Reformed Church. In March 1823 he was locked out of Peace Church (famously called “the Stone Church in Shiremanstown”) by his congregation.

Initially, Winebrenner, along with those that split off from Peace Church, met for outdoor services on a nearby hill in the area known as White Hall, leading to the area being referred to as "Camp Hill." Dr. John D. Bowman, the first postmaster of that village, officially gave it the name Camp Hill in 1869 and it was incorporated as a borough in 1885.

His Christian testimony can be found in the book The Testimony of a Hundred Witnesses (1858) edited by John Frederick Weishampel. In 1830, he and five other ministers founded the Church of God (whose members are sometimes called "Winebrennerians"). He served as speaker at the first eldership and subsequently edited and published the Church of God paper, first called The Gospel Publisher (1835–1845) and later The Church Advocate (beginning in 1845).

In January 1836, he established the first Anti-Slavery Society of Harrisburg, where he became an ardent abolitionist and represented his society at the State Convention, and later served as its Corresponding Secretary.

Winebrenner was also a pacifist, seeing no justification for war except in cases of self-defense. This opinion put him and his nascent denomination in accord with the Peace Churches movement in the United States. He was particularly outspoken in his opposition to the Mexican War of 1846-1848.

Later, his denomination moved its headquarters to Findlay, Ohio, where it sponsors Findlay University and since 1947, the Winebrenner Theological Seminary. In 1975 the General Eldership became known as the Churches of God, General Conference. The Conference supports mission ministries in the United States and abroad and numbered around 31,000 members in 2000.

He died from cholera in Harrisburg, Pennsylvania and was interred at Harrisburg Cemetery.

== Bibliography ==
- A Prayer Meeting and Revival Hymn Book. First issued in 1825, this book (words only) went through over twenty editions.
- A Brief View, of the Formation, Government and Discipline, of the Church of God (First issued in 1829)
- A Sermon on Christian Baptism (Harrisburg, 1830)
- Das Christliche Gesang=Buch (First issued in 1834)
- Reference and Pronouncing Testament (First issued in 1836)
- A Popular Treatise on Regeneration (First issued in 1844)
- The Seraphina (Harrisburg, 1854)
- The Church Hymn Book (First issued in 1859)
- Doctrinal and Practical Sermons (First issued in book form in 1860)
- The History of all the Religious Denominations in the United States (First issued in 1844 with I. Daniel Rupp.)
