= Luther Monument =

Monument dedicated to Martin Luther

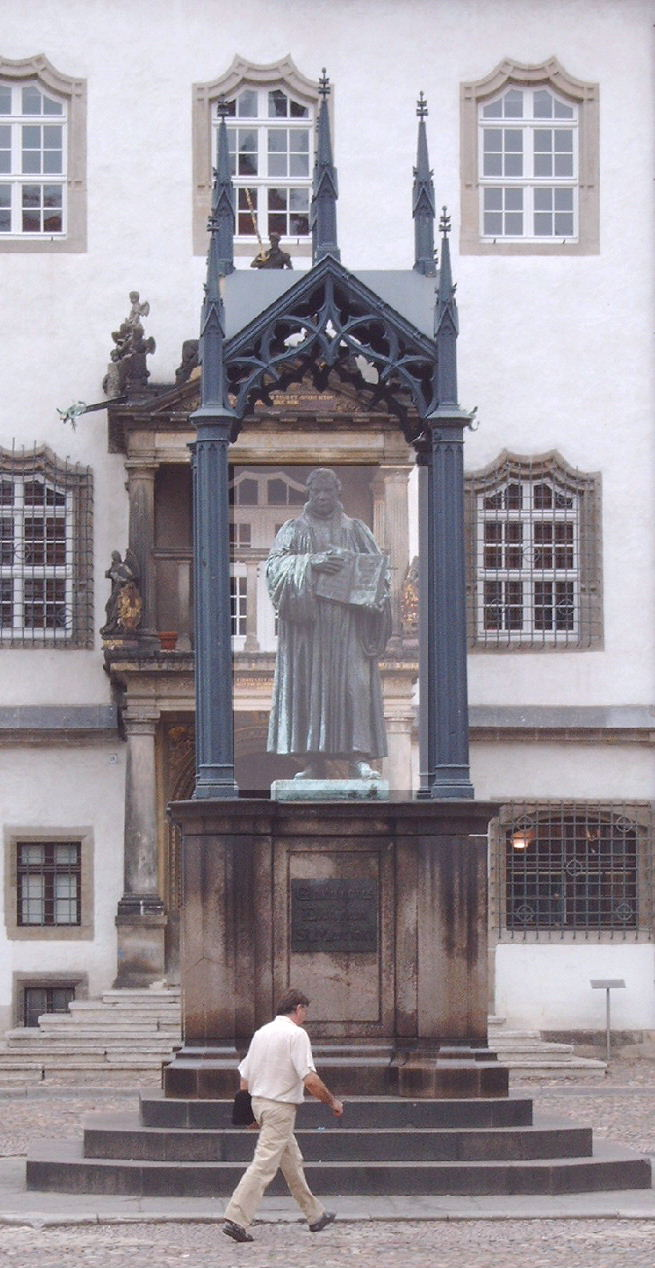
Luther Monument on the Wittenberg market square

The Luther Monument (German: Lutherdenkmal) is a monument dedicated to the reformer Martin Luther. The oldest one from 1821 is in Wittenberg. The largest one, the Luther Monument in Worms, was unveiled in 1868 as a composition of several statues, designed by Ernst Rietschel. Several monuments in the United States use a copy of Rietschel's main statue, including the Luther Monument in Washington, D.C., from 1884.

== History ==
Monuments for Luther were mainly erected in the second half of the 19th century. In several German towns, the served as memorials for the Reformation which Luther initiated. They often connect to events in the reformer's life, sometimes a visit in the town. The oldest full-size monument is the Luther Monument in Wittenberg, which was at the same time the first public full-size monument for a person who was not noble. It was designed by Johann Gottfried Schadow and unveiled in 1821.

The largest monument was designed by Ernst Rietschel, and unveiled in Worms in 1868. Several statues with Luther in the centre are arranged in the shape of a castle, reminiscent of Luther's hymn "Ein feste Burg ist unser Gott" ("A Mighty Fortress Is Our God"). It influenced the design of other monuments. The central figure was copied several times, including seven replicas in the United States.

== Monuments in Europe ==
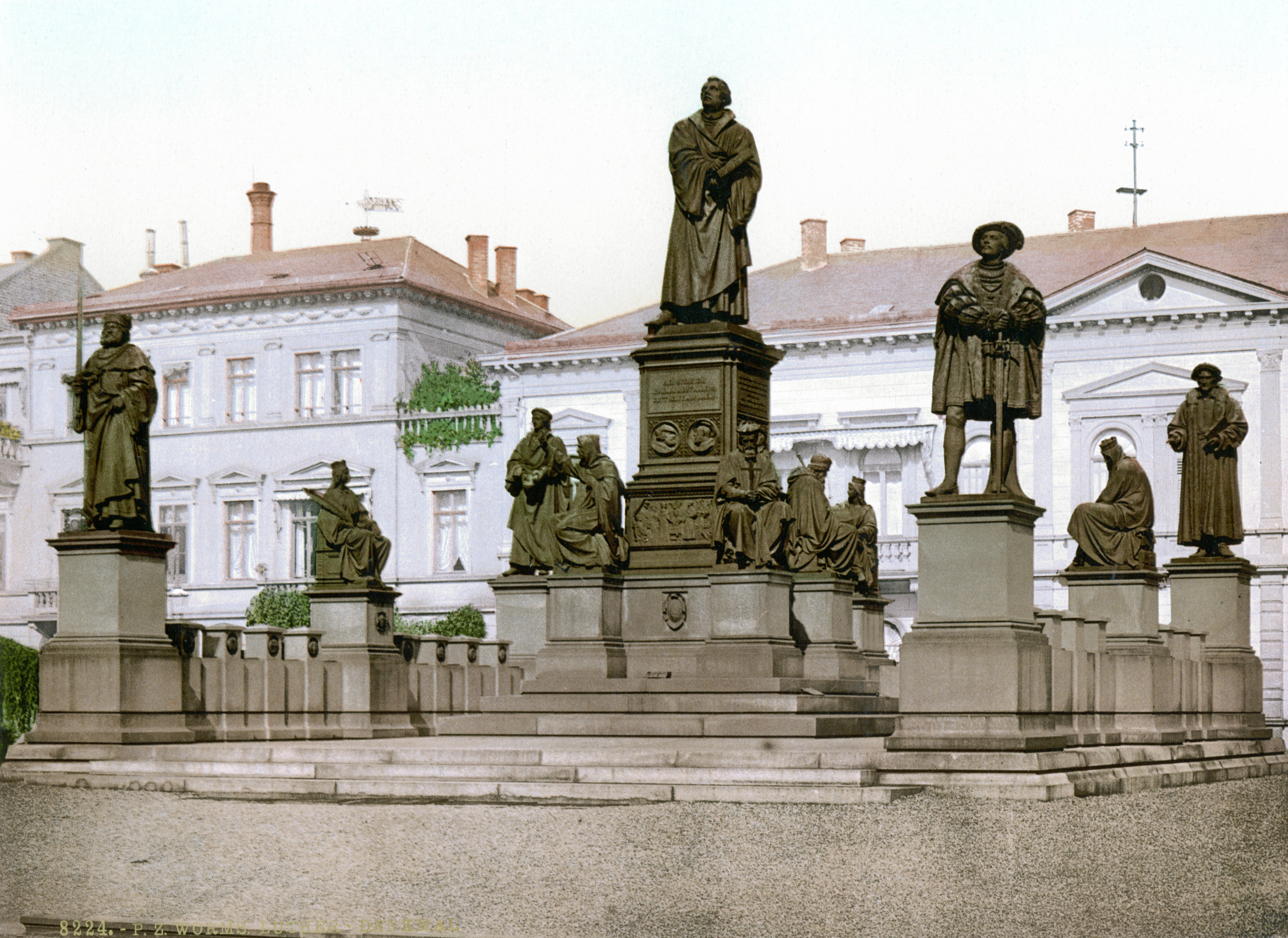
Luther Monument in Worms, 1900

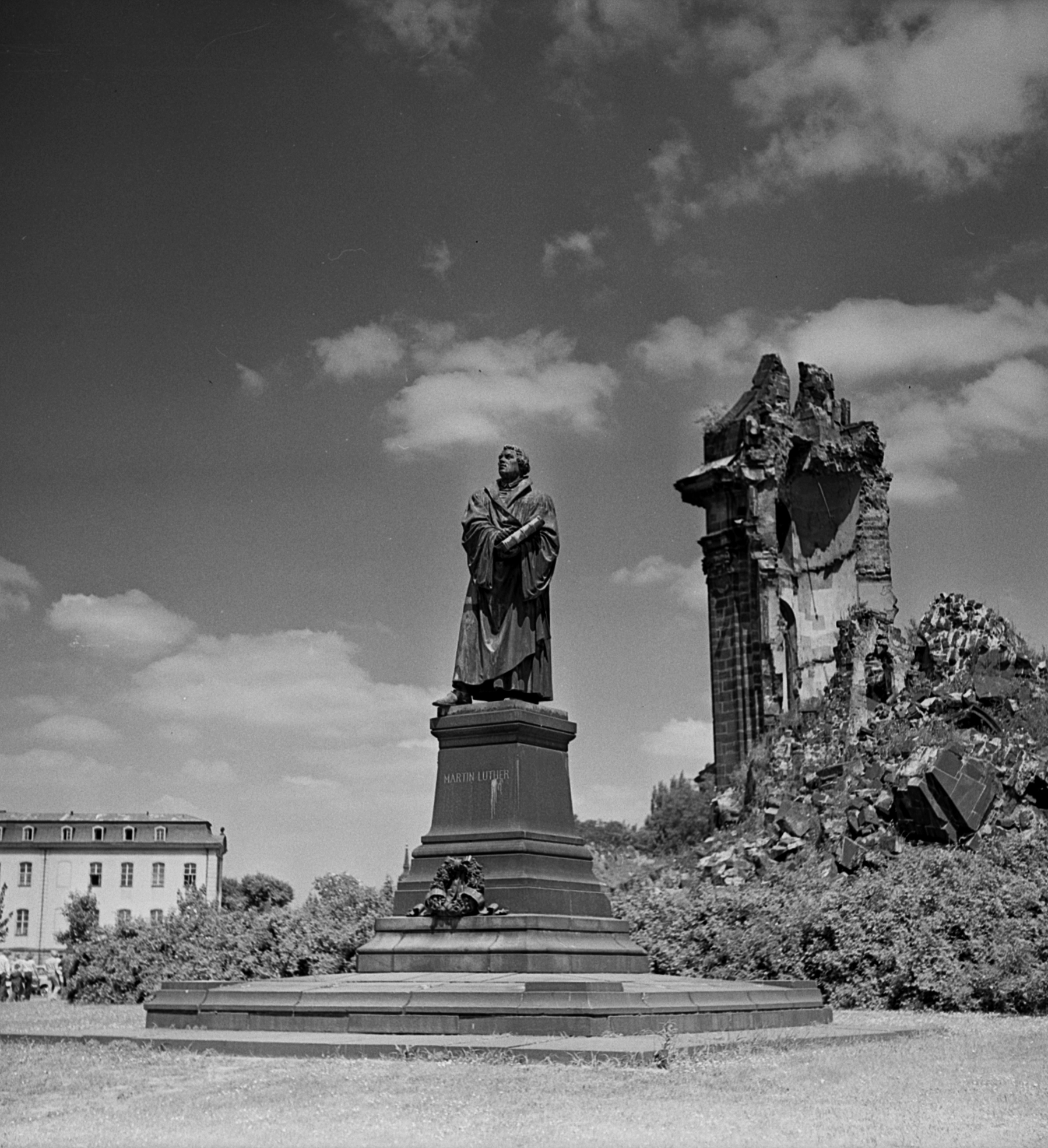
Luther Monument and the wreckage of the Frauenkirche in Dresden, 1970s

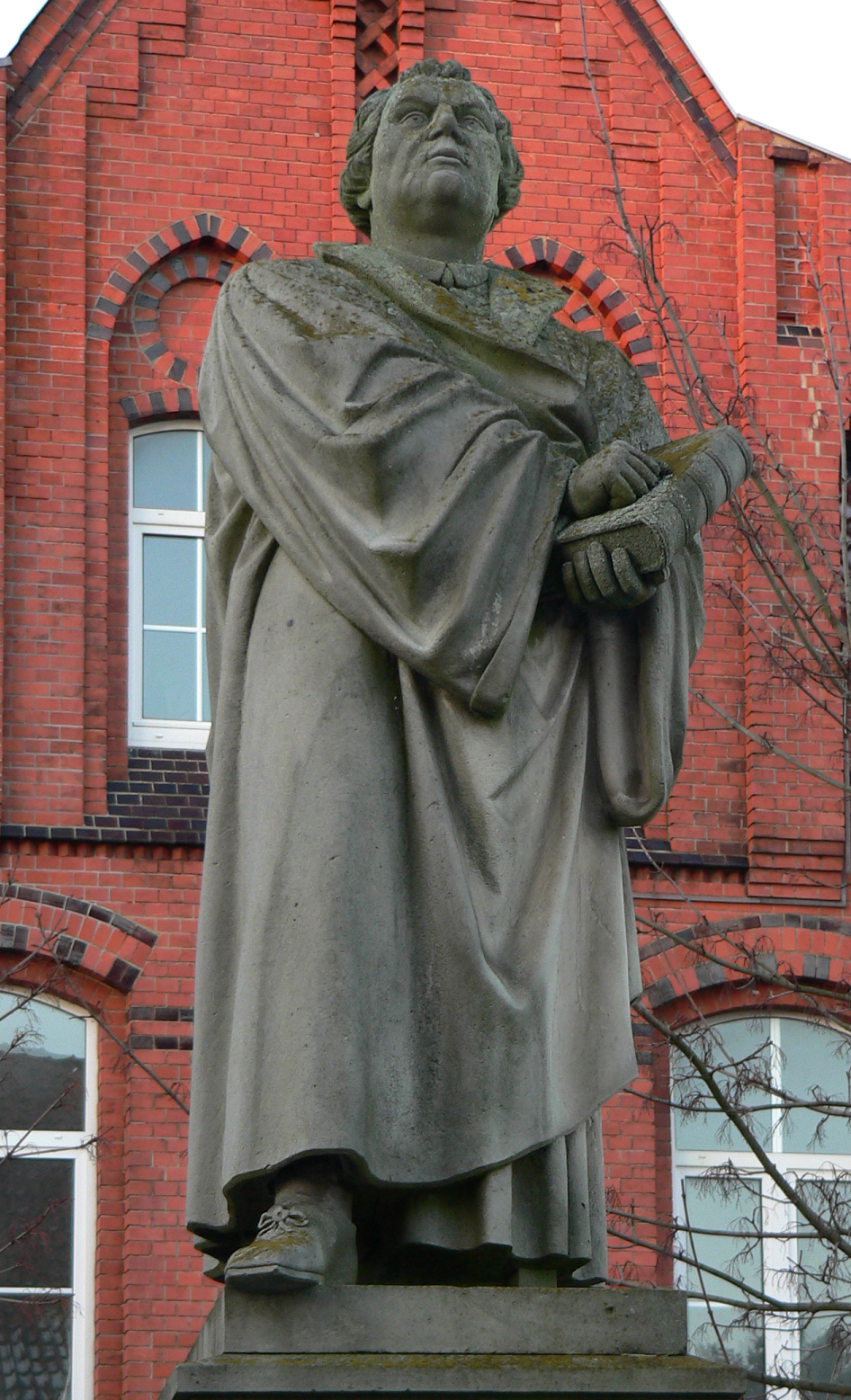
Luther Monument in Elze

- in Annaberg-Buchholz (1883)
- in Aš, Bohemia (1883)
- Luther Monument in Bad Schandau (1817)
- on the Friedhof der Dorotheenstädtischen und Friedrichswerderschen Gemeinden in Berlin (1909), copy of the Wittenberg monument
- Luther Monument at the Marienkirche in Berlin (1895) by Paul Otto and Robert Toberentz
- Luther Monument in Bielsko-Biała, Poland (1900) at the Lutherkirche, by Franz Vogl
- in Coburg (1883) in the Lutherschule, probably after Rietschel
- in Cottbus (1911) in front of the Niedersorbisches Gymnasium, by Heinrich Goetschmann
- in Dresden (1885) at the Frauenkirche, by Adolf von Donndorf after Rietschel
- in Elze (1883)
- Luther Monument in Eisenach (1885) by Adolf von Donndorf
- in Eisleben (1883) on the market square, by Rudolf Siemering
- Luther Monument in Erfurt (1889), by Fritz Schaper
- in Hamburg (1912) at the Micheliskirche, by Otto Lessing
- Luther Monument in Hanover (1900) at the Marktkirche, by Carl Dopmeyer, completed by Ferdinand Hartzer
- in Kirchberg (1908) in the Lutherpark, copy after Rietschel
- Luther Monument in Magdeburg (1886) in front of the Johanniskirche, by Emil Hundrieser
- Luther Monument in Möhra (1861) by Ferdinand Müller
- Luther Monument on Norderney (1883), by Bernhard Högl
- in Nürnberg at the St. Sebald, with Phillipp Melanchthon
- in Speyer (1903) at the Gedächtniskirche der Protestation, by Hermann Hahn
- Luther Monument near Steinbach (Bad Liebenstein) (1857)
- in Uelzen (1883) after Rietschel
- in Wennigsen (Deister), Lower Saxony (1960), copy of Springfield, Illinois
- Lutherdenkmal in Wittenberg (1821) on the market square, by Johann Gottfried Schadow
- Luther Monument in Worms (1868), by Ernst Rietschel

== Monuments in other continents ==
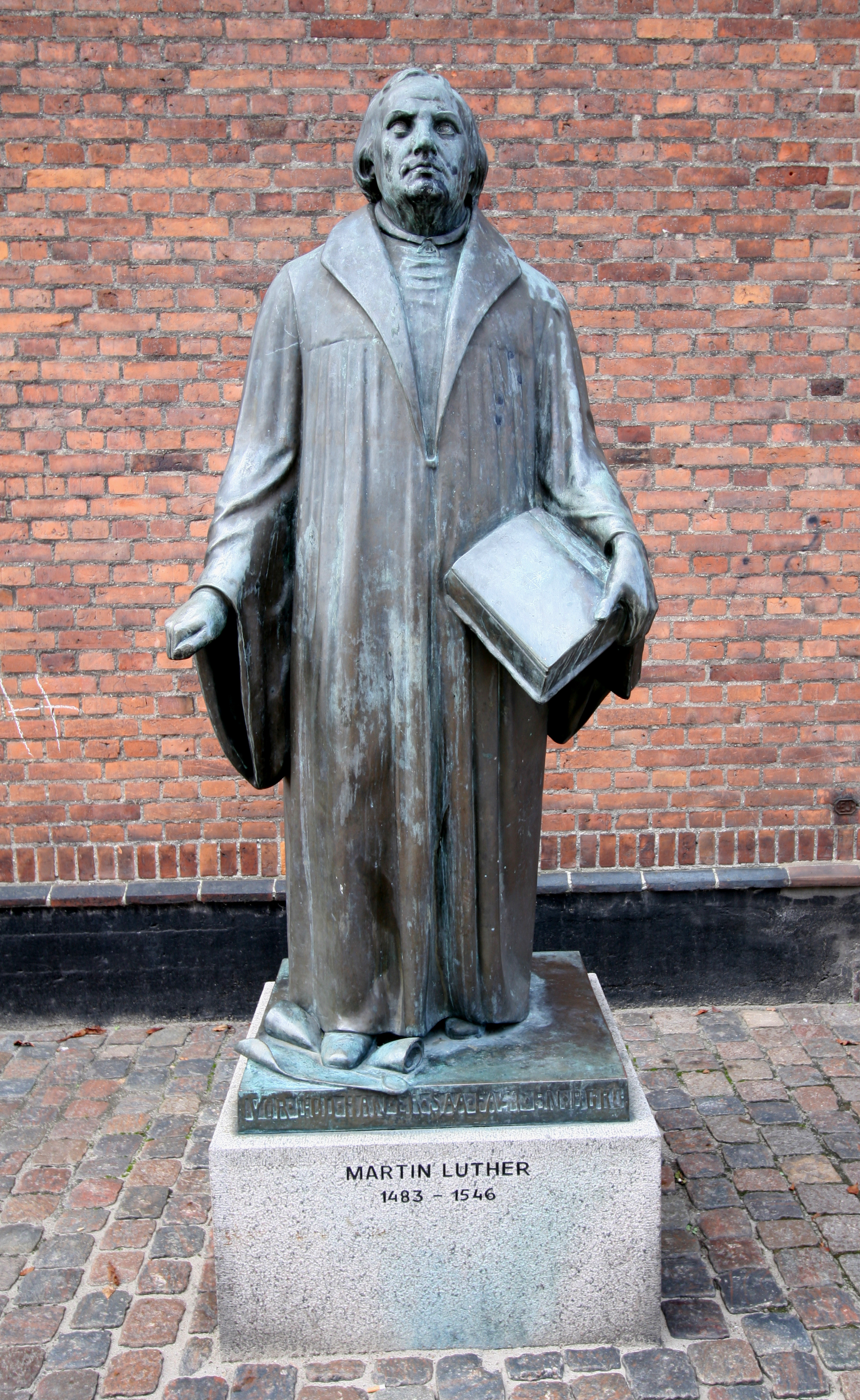
Luther Monument in Copenhagen

- in Nova Friburgo, Brazil (2004) by Otavio Teixeira M. Neto
- in Santiago de Chile, Chile (2002) by Serena Piacentini, first Luther Monument in Spanish-speaking Latin America
- in front of the Lutherkirche in Copenhagen, Dänemark (1983) by Rikard Magnussen
- in Edmonton, Alberta, Canada (1987) on the Augustana Campus of the University of Alberta, by Danek Mozdzenski
- in Baltimore, Maryland, U.S. (1936) by Hans Schuler
- in Clayton, Missouri, U.S. (1904) on the campus of the Concordia Seminary, copy after Rietschel
- Martin Luther at Worms in Decorah, Iowa, U.S. (1911) on the campus of the Luther College, copy after Rietschel
- in Dubuque, Iowa, U.S. (1921) on the campus of the Wartburg Theological Seminary, copy after Rietschel
- in Fort Wayne, Indiana, U.S. (1957) on the campus of the Concordia Theological Seminary, by Friedrich Adolf Sötebier
- in Gettysburg, Pennsylvania, U.S. (1947) on the campus of the Lutheran Theological Seminary, by Hans Schuler
- Luther at 38 in Louisville, Kentucky, U.S. (1960) in front of the First Lutheran Church, copy after the one in Fort Wayne
- in Mount Clemens, Michigan, U. S. (1930) at the Cadillac Memorial Gardens, copy after Rietschel
- in Seguin, Texas, U.S. (1976) on the campus of the Texas Lutheran College, by Elmer Petersen
- Martin Luther the Teacher, Martin Luther the Musician in Springfield, Ohio, U.S. (1956) on the Campus of the Wittenberg University, by A. Regis Milione
- in St. Paul, Minnesota, U.S. (1921) on the campus of the Concordia College, copy after Rietschel
- in Austin. Texas. U.S. (2000) on the campus of Concordia University Texas, by Eloiese Krabbenhoft, Professor at Texas State University, San Marcus, Texas. Using measurements and Cranach portraits from the Wittenberg Luther Museum's curator, Martin Treu, Krabbenhoeft employed forensic technology to create a Luther from 1501, the age of an entering freshman at Concordia.
- in Streator, Illinois, U.S. (1935) in the Hillcrest Memorial Park, copy after Rietschel
- Luther Monument in Washington, D.C., U.S. (1884), copy after Rietschel
- in New Ulm, Minnesota at Martin Luther College
- in Mequon, Wisconsin at Wisconsin Lutheran Seminary
- in Mequon, Wisconsin at Concordia University Wisconsin

== Literature ==
- Otto Kammer: Reformationsdenkmäler des 19. und 20. Jahrhunderts: Eine Bestandsaufnahme. Evangelische Verlagsanstalt, Leipzig 2004, ISBN 3-374-02188-3.
- Christiane Theiselmann: Das Wormser Lutherdenkmal Ernst Rietschels (1856–1868) im Rahmen der Lutherrezeption des 19. Jahrhunderts. Europäische Hochschulschriften, Frankfurt am Main 1992, ISBN 3-631-44332-3.
- Familienblatt der Lutheriden-Vereinigung, 3. Band, Heft 5, 13. Jahrgang, Februar 1939. Digitalisat (PDF).
