= Luther Monument (Worms) =

Monument to Martin Luther in Worms, Germany

- Lutherdenkmal (German)
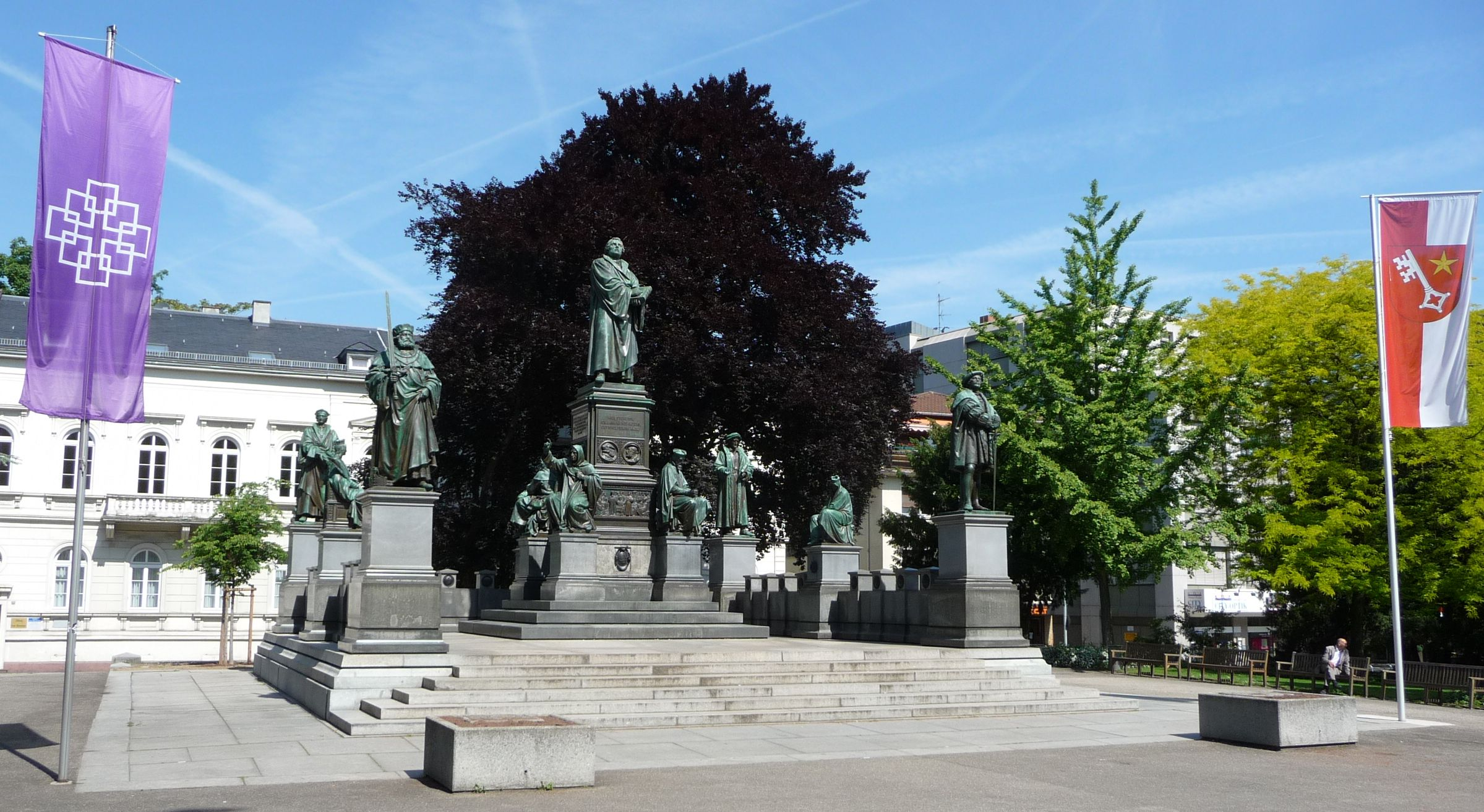
- The Luther Monument in May 2010
- Artist: Ernst Rietschel; Adolf von Donndorf; Johannes Schilling; Gustav Adolph Kietz; Georg Hermann Nicolai
- Year: 1868
- Type: Bronze
- Location: Worms, Germany; 49.6323°N 8.3601°E
- Owner: Worms

The Luther Monument (German: Lutherdenkmal) is a group of statues that was erected in Worms, Rhineland-Palatinate, Germany, to commemorate the Protestant reformer Martin Luther. It was designed and partly made by Ernst Rietschel, and unveiled on 25 June 1868. The monument includes a group of bronze statues on stone plinths centred on a statue of Luther, surrounded by statues of related individuals and allegorical statues representing related towns. The elements are arranged in the shape of a castle, reflecting Luther's hymn "A Mighty Fortress Is Our God" ("Ein feste Burg ist unser Gott" in German).

It is the largest of the Luther Monuments, and shaped views of the reformer. Copies of the central Luther statue are located in Europe and the United States, including the Luther Monument in Washington, D.C. (1884).

== History ==
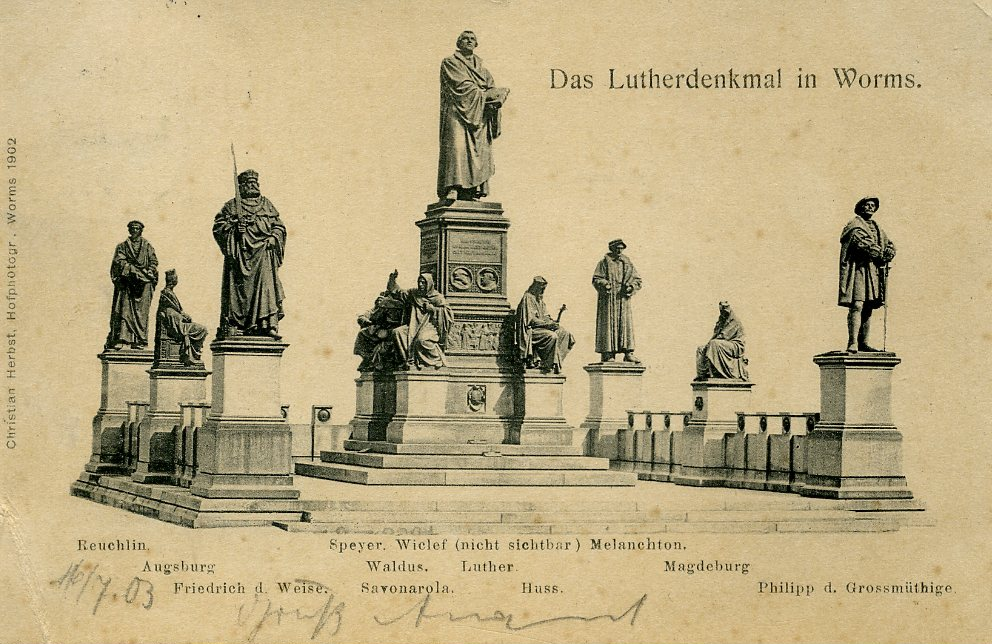
The monument on a 1902 postcard

Plans to build a significant monument to Martin Luther in Worms were already made in the 18th century. In 1856, an association, the Luther-Denkmal-Verein, was formed, which pursued the idea and collected donations from Europe and the Americas. Among the historical topics remembered by the monument are Luther's Ninety-five Theses of 1517 and his appearance at the Diet of Worms in 1521, where he defended his theses facing Charles V, Holy Roman Emperor. The main 3.5 m (11 ft) high bronze statue of Luther is surrounded by eleven others depicting other reformers, political figures, and personified related towns. The statues are mounted on separate stone plinths on a stepped base, and the overall shape of the monument is intended to resemble a castle, representing Luther's hymn "Ein feste Burg ist unser Gott" (A firm castle is our God).

Ernst Rietschel designed the group in 1859. He completed the sculptures of Luther and John Wycliff but died in 1861. The other statues were mostly executed by his pupils. Adolf von Donndorf contributed standing figures of Reuchlin and Frederick the Wise of Saxony, seated figures of Girolamo Savonarola, Peter Waldo and an allegorical statue (with mural crown) representing the town of Magdeburg grieving after the Sack of Magdeburg in 1631, as well as reliefs. Johannes Schilling created a statue for the town of Speyer, the location of the Protestation at Speyer in 1529. Gustav Adolph Kietz made statues of Jan Hus, Philipp Melanchthon, Philip I, Landgrave of Hesse, and one for the town of Augsburg, where the Augsburg Confession was first presented in 1530. The architect Georg Hermann Nicolai, a pupil of Gottfried Semper, was also involved. The monument was cast at the Kunst- und Glockengießerei Lauchhammer.

Luther is depicted in the robe of preacher, not the habit and cowl of a monk. He is holding a Bible in his left hand, and rests his right fist upon the book. According to Hans A. Pohlsander, "his posture suggests courage and determination".

In addition to the main statues, the monument has inscriptions with quotations, scenes from Luther's life, coats of arms of 27 Protestant towns, and bronze relief sculptures depicting two Electors of Saxony, with others including Justus Jonas, Johann Bugenhagen, Johannes Calvin and Ulrich Zwingli.

The monument was unveiled on 25 June 1868 in a ceremony attended by around 20,000 people, including nobility and leading German Protestants. Rietschel's statue of Luther became a typical image of the reformer in the late 19th century and became a model for many monuments to him, with copies in Europe and the United States, such as the Luther Monument in Washington, D.C. (1884), and others at the Concordia Lutheran Seminary in St. Louis (1903), in Decorah, Iowa (1911), Saint Paul, Minnesota (1921), Dubuque, Iowa (1923), and Detroit (1930). The 150th anniversary of the monument was celebrated as a major event in 2018.

== Gallery ==
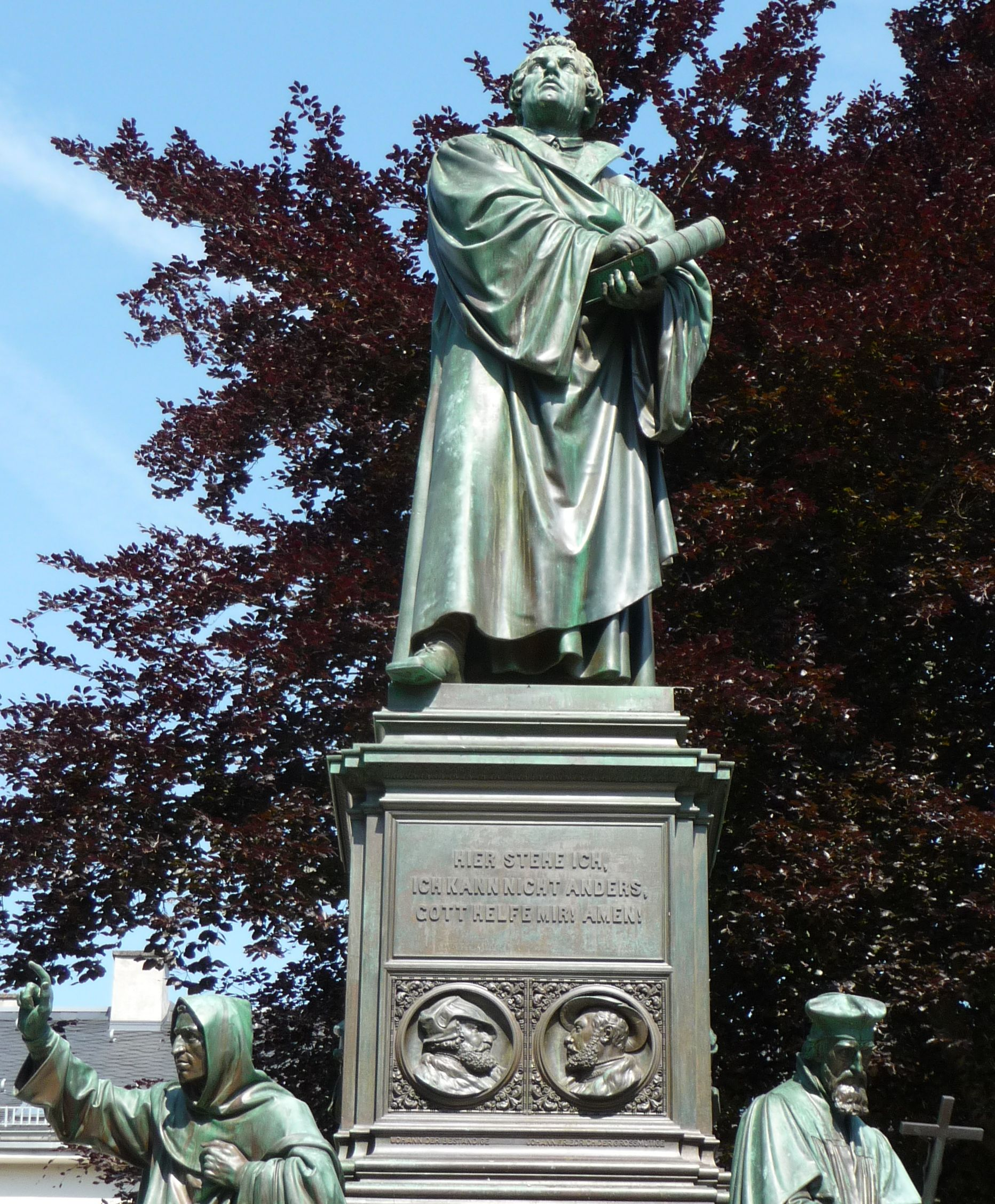
Martin Luther

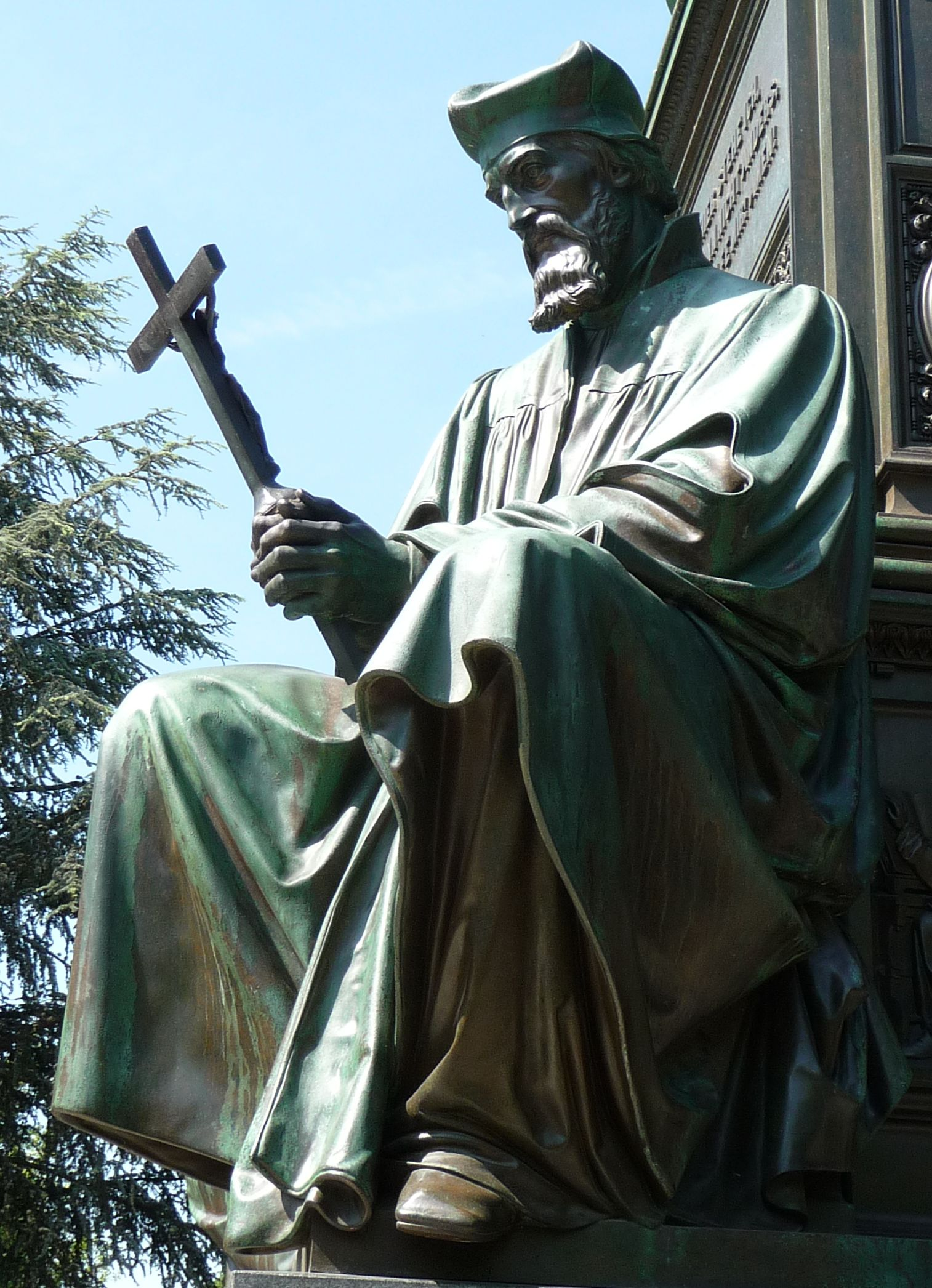
Jan Hus

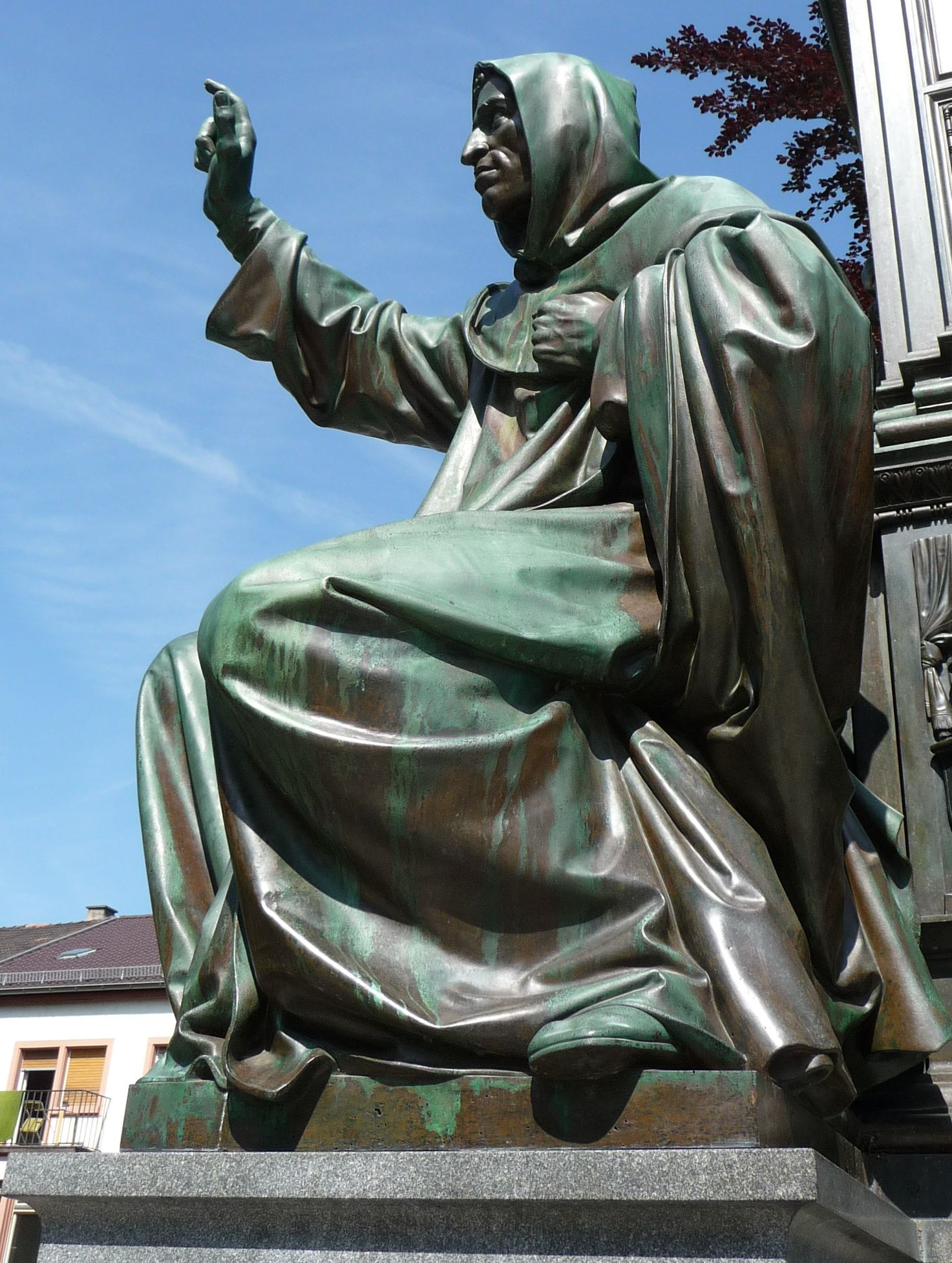
Girolamo Savonarola

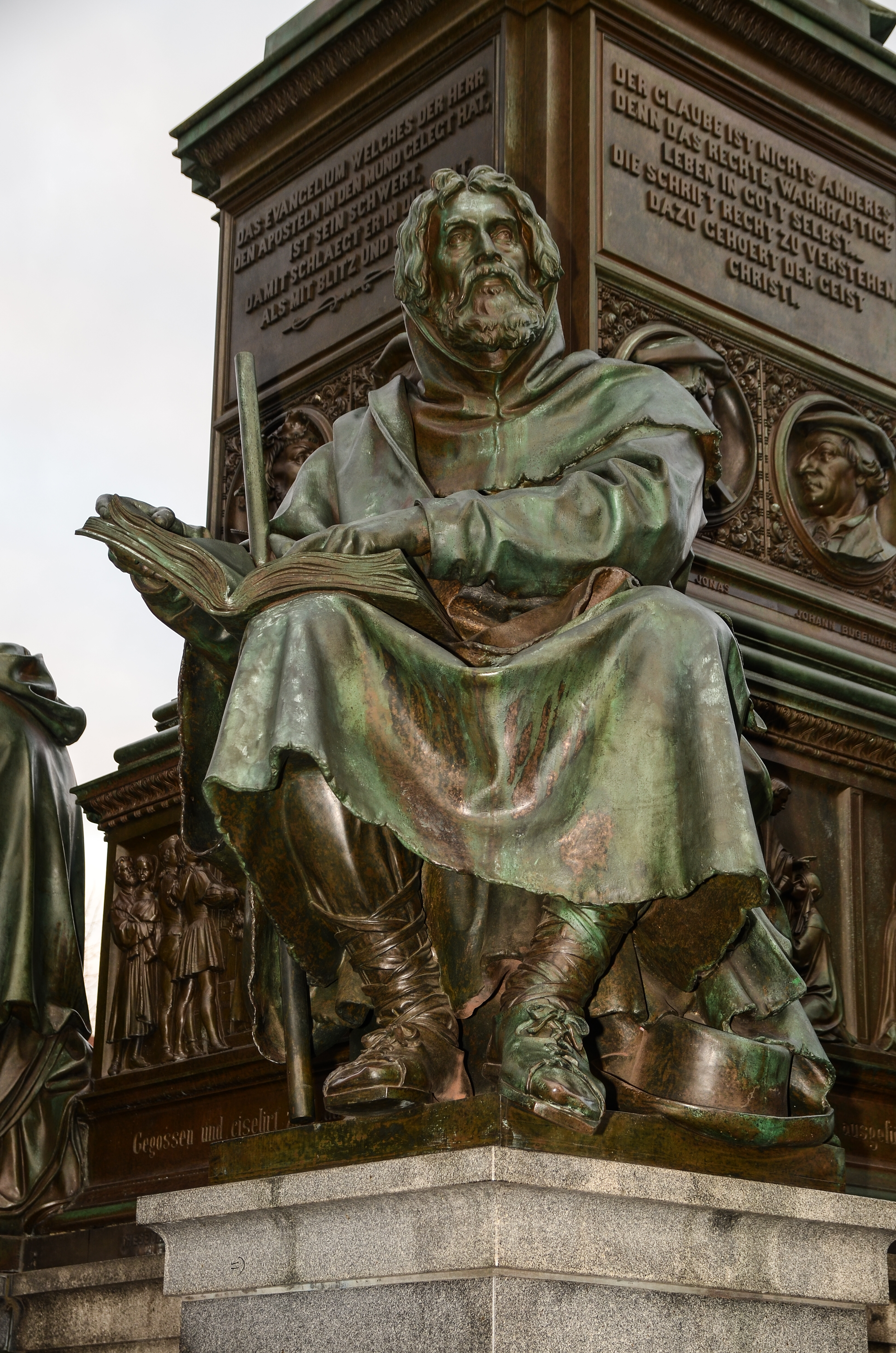
Peter Waldo

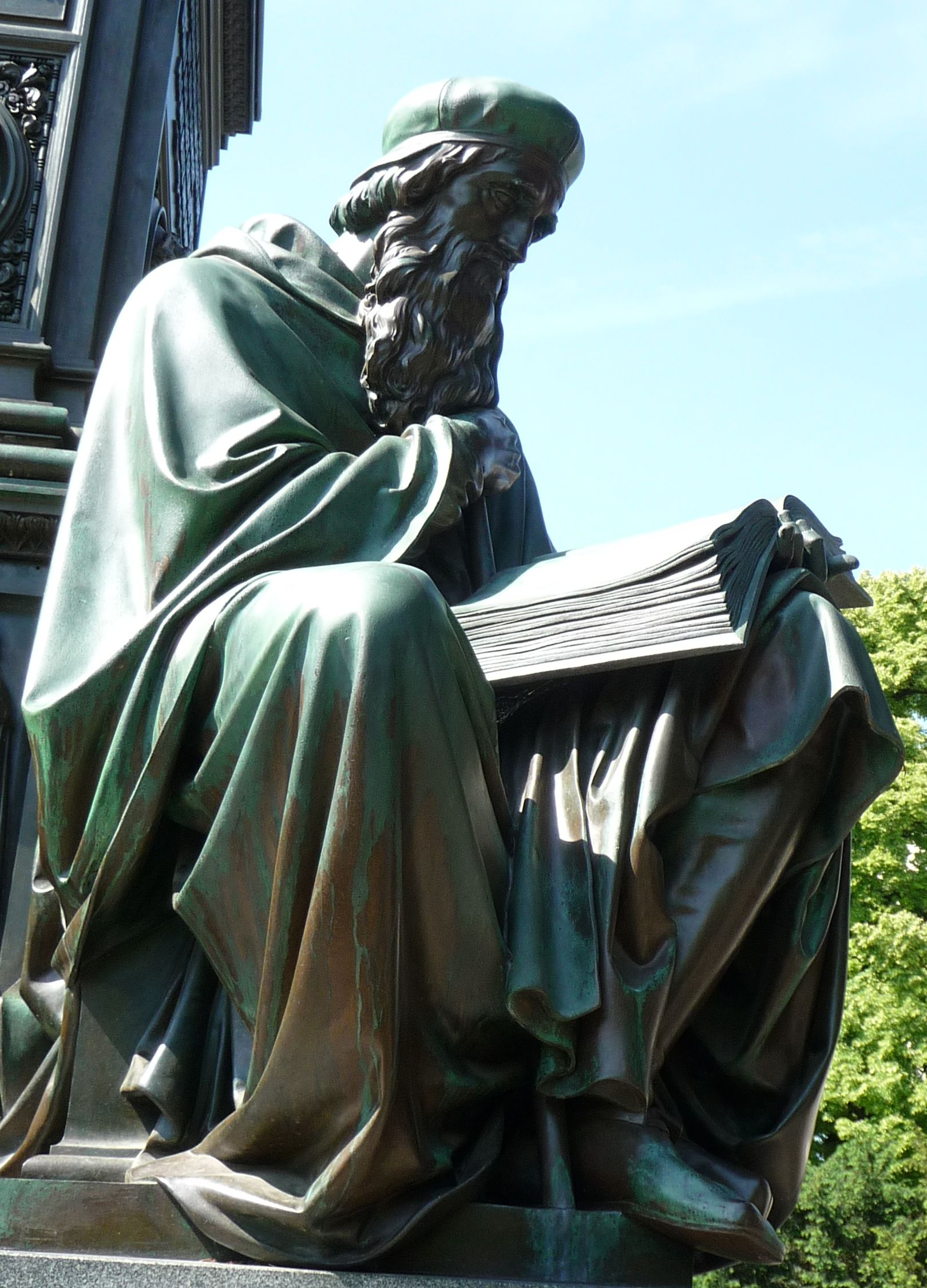
John Wycliffe

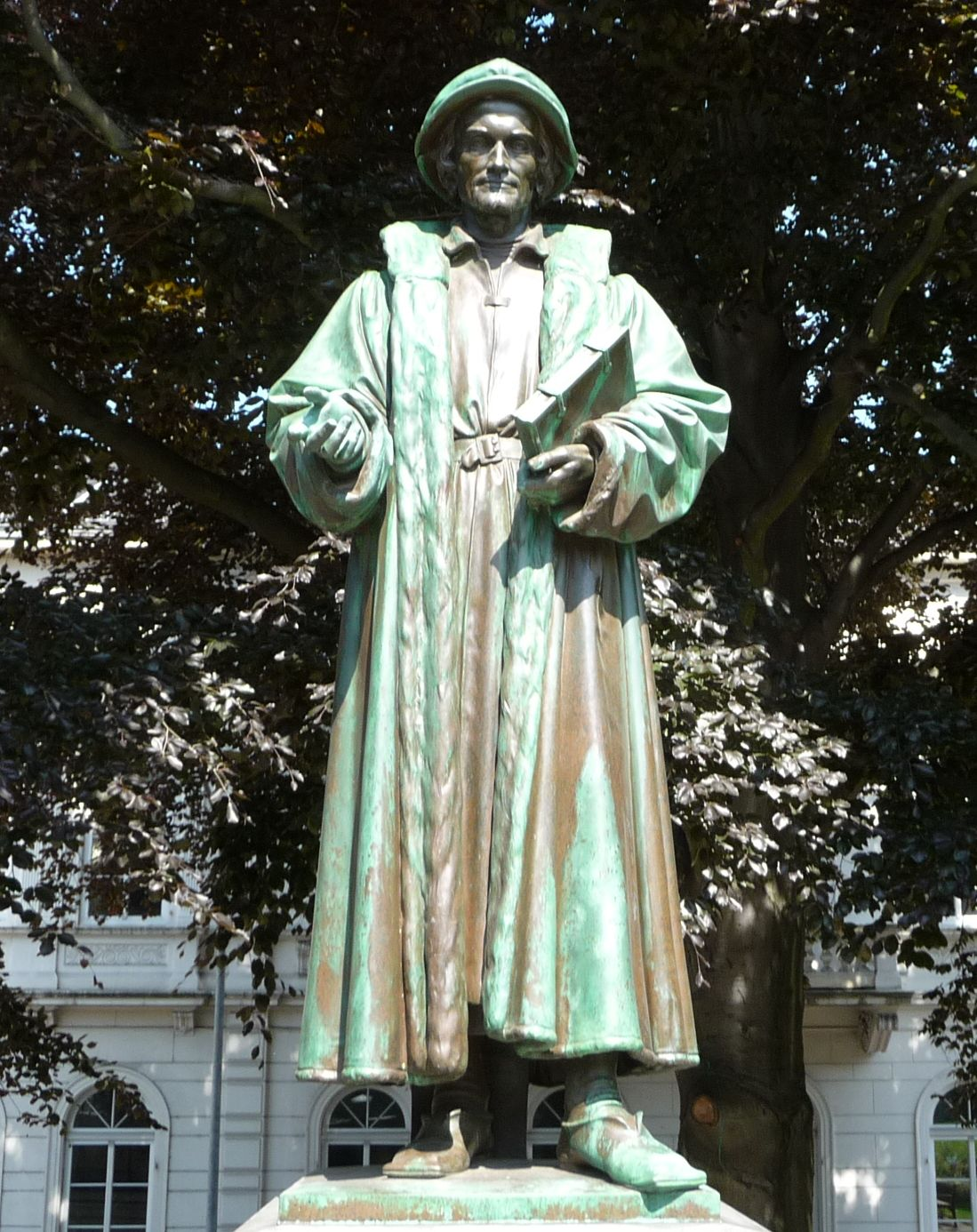
Philip Melanchthon

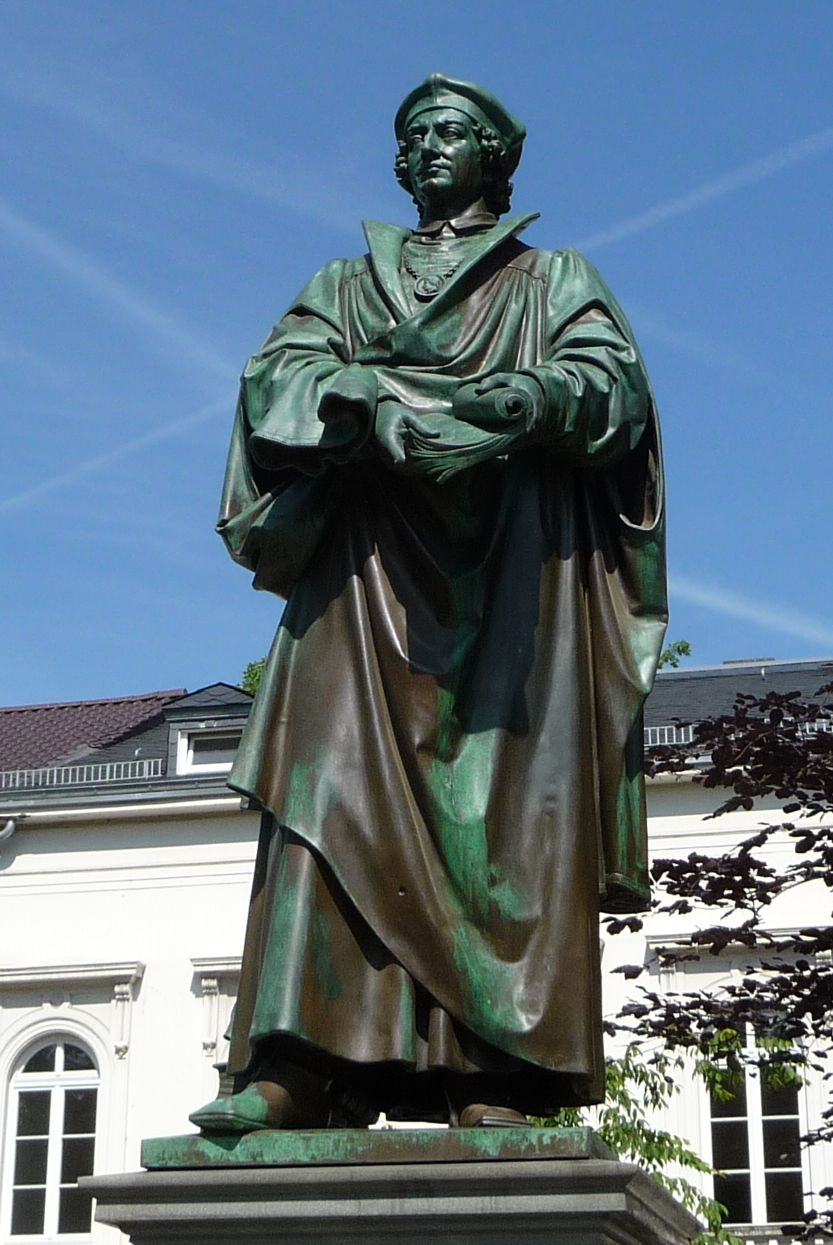
Johann Reuchlin

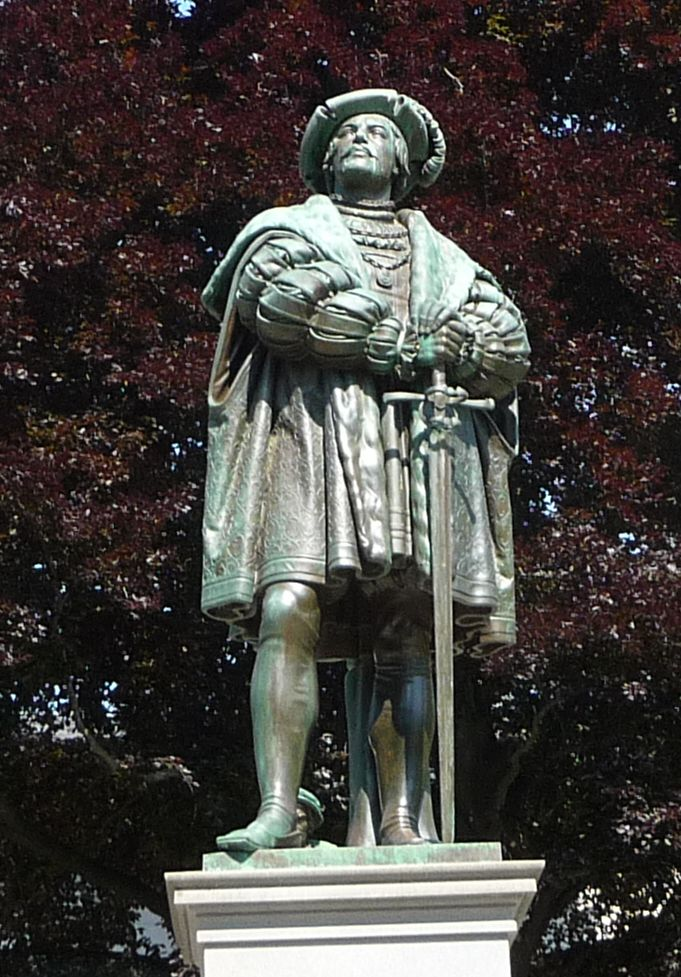
Philip I, Landgrave of Hesse

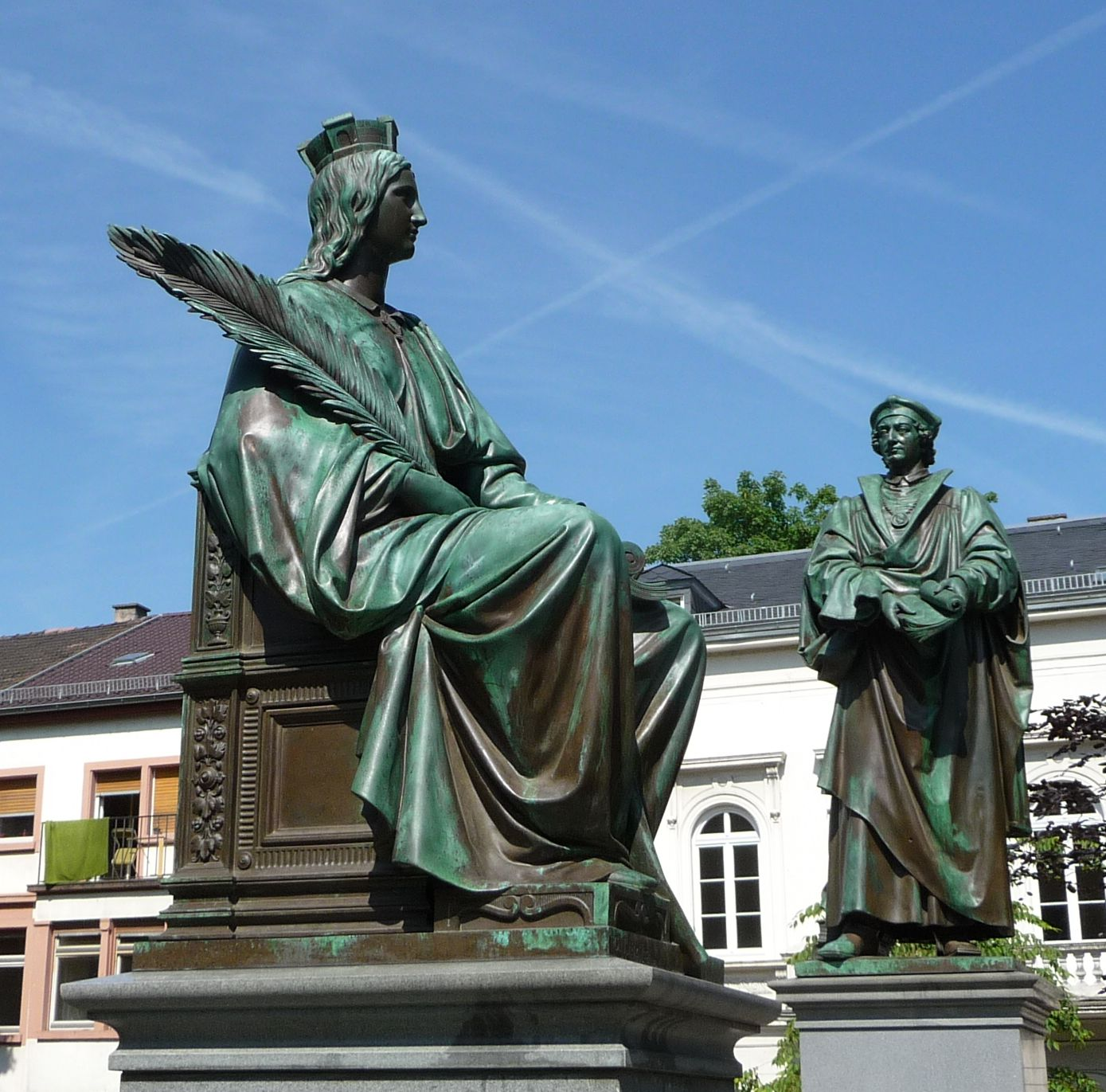
Augsburg

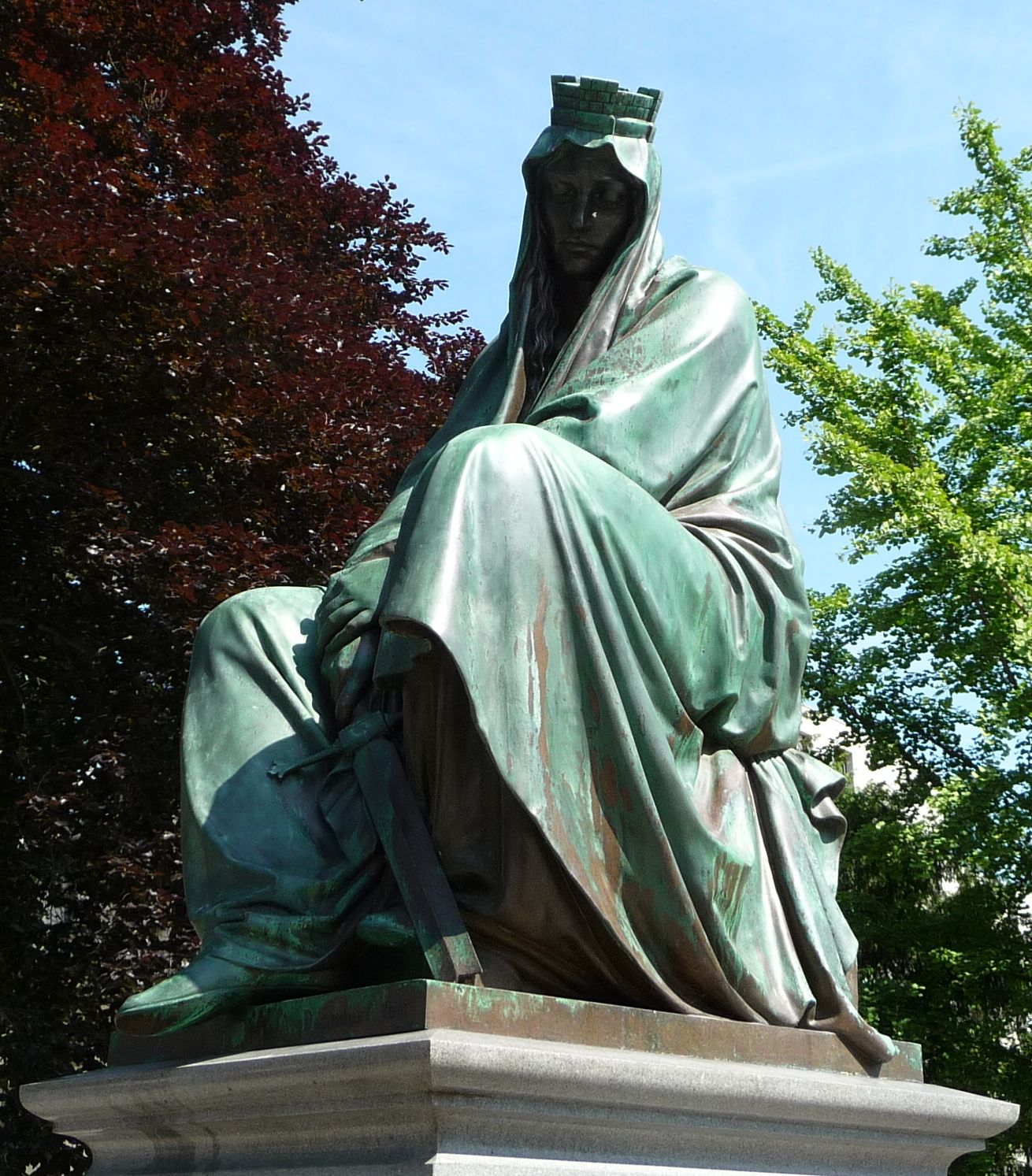
Magdeburg

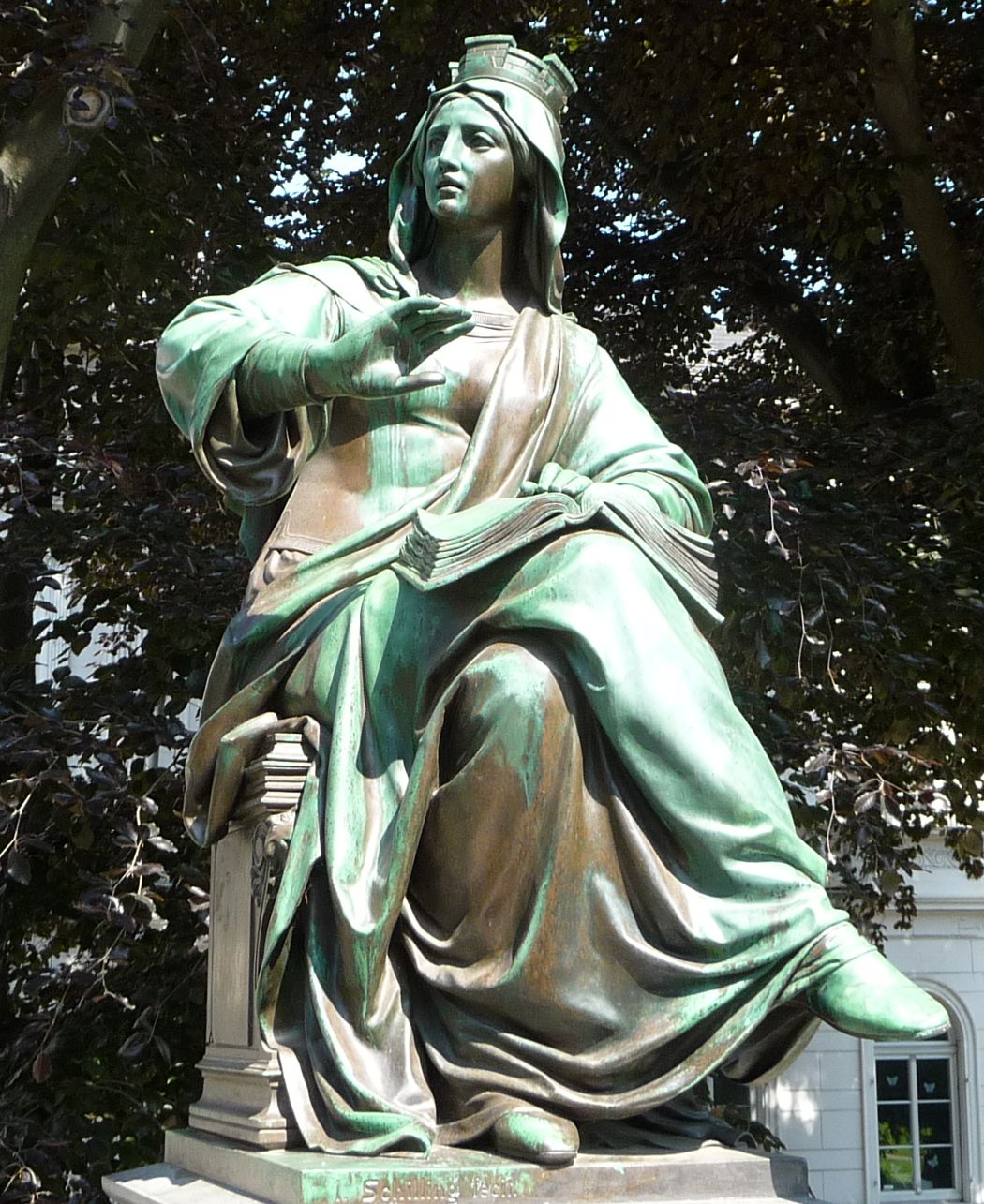
Speyer

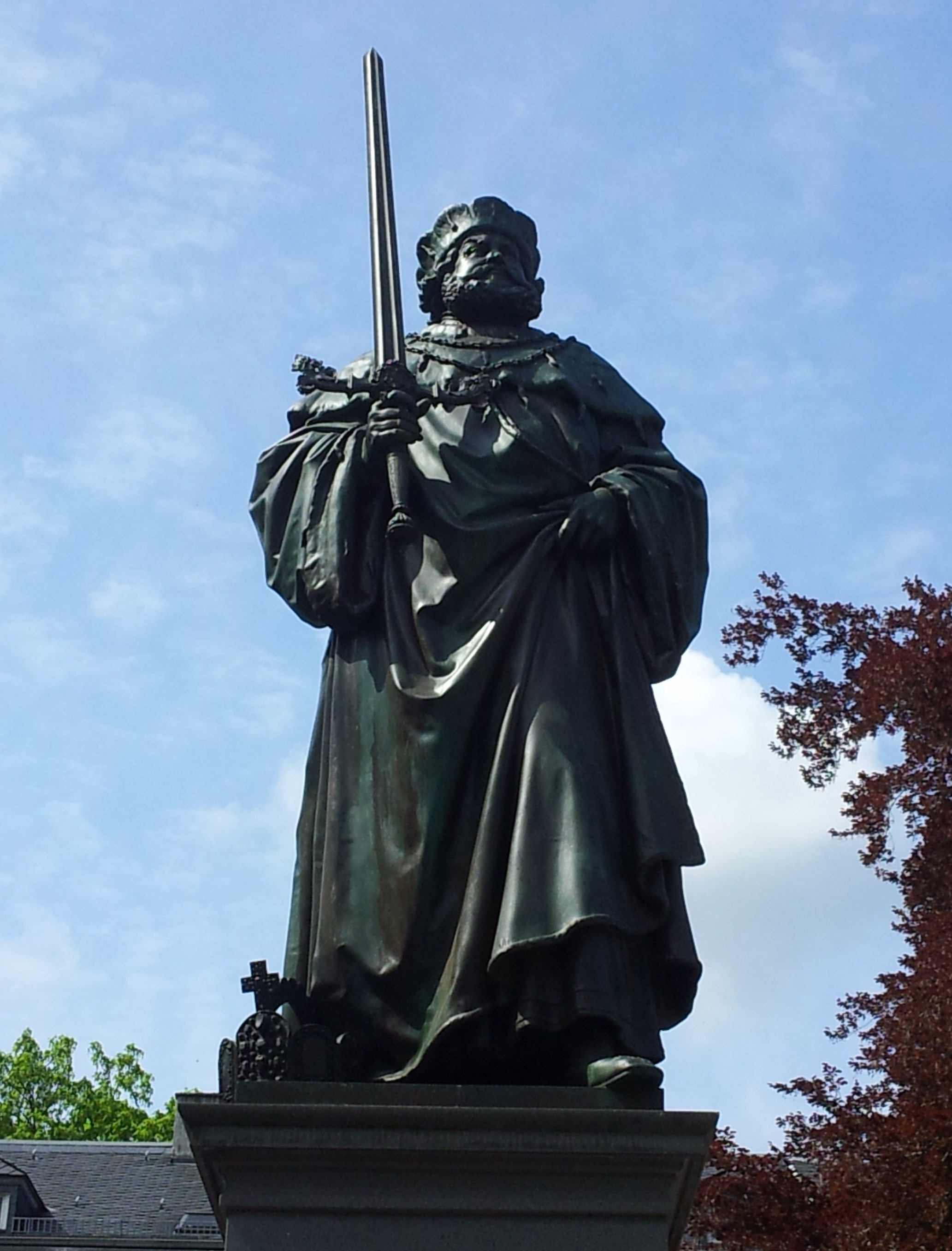
Frederick III, Elector of Saxony

== Literature ==
- Ludwig Joseph Hundhausen: Das Luthermonument zu Worms im Lichte der Wahrheit. Gedanken und Thatsachen zur Beantwortung der Frage: Kirche oder Protestantismus? Franz Kirchheim, Mainz 1868.
- Christiane Theiselmann: Das Wormser Lutherdenkmal Ernst Rietschels (1856–1868) im Rahmen der Lutherrezeption des 19. Jahrhunderts. Europäische Hochschulschriften, Frankfurt am Main 1992. ISBN 3-631-44332-3.
- Ferdinand Werner: Das Lutherdenkmal und die Wormser Grünanlagen. In: Die Gartenkunst 24 (2/2012), pp. 223–259.
