= Luther Monument (Washington, D.C.) =

Statue by Ernst Friedrich August Rietschel in Washington, D.C., U.S.

- U.S. National Register of Historic Places
- U.S. Historic district – Contributing property
- D.C. Inventory of Historic Sites
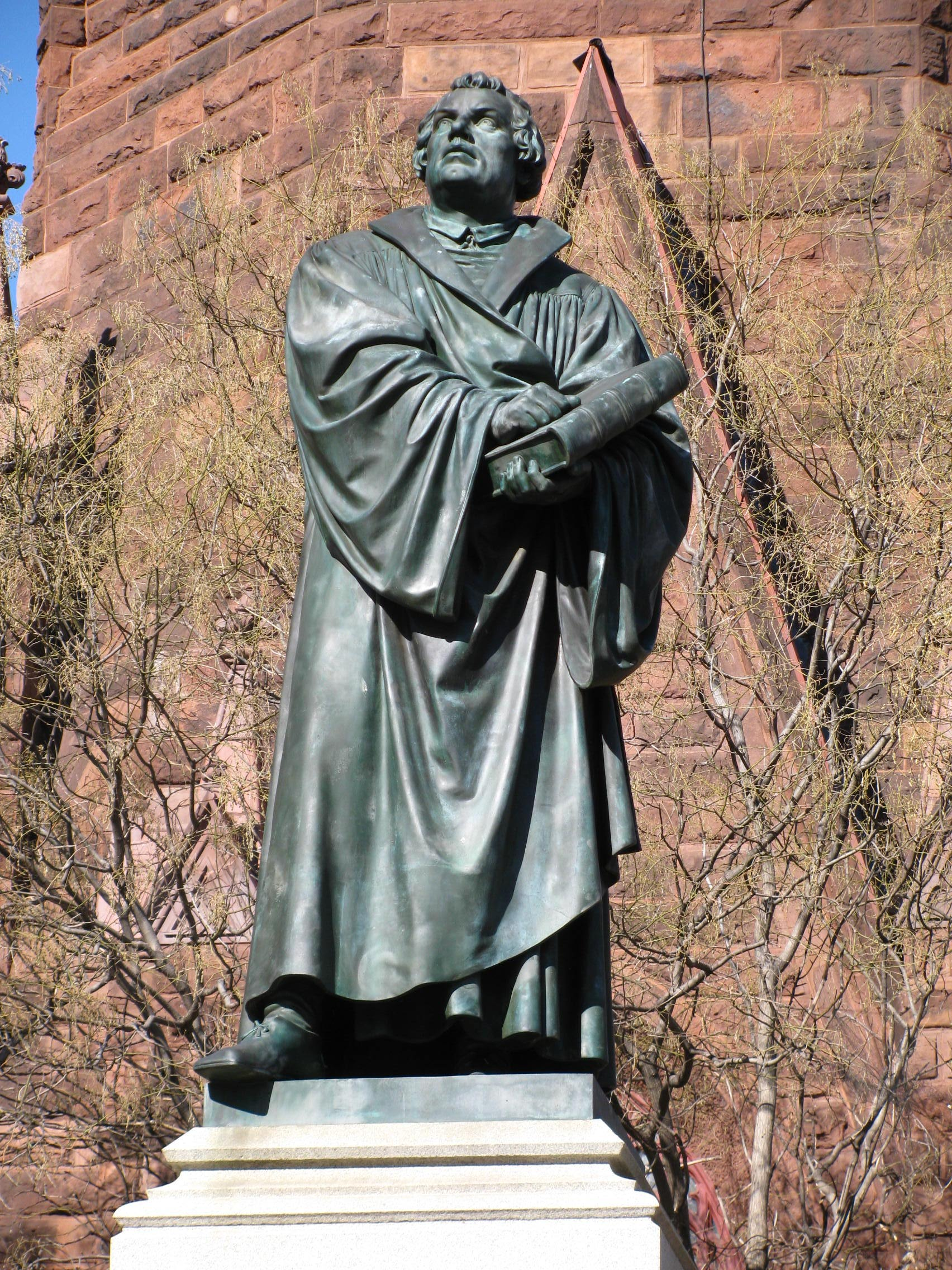
- Luther Monument in 2011
- Location: Luther Place Memorial Church, Washington, D.C.
- Coordinates: 38°54′22.76″N 77°1′53.99″W
- Built: 1884 (replica); 1868 (Luther Monument)
- Architect: Ernst Friedrich August Rietschel (sculptor); Adolf Cluss and Paul Schulze (architects, pedestal)
- Part of: Greater Fourteenth Street Historic District (ID94000992)
- NRHP reference No.: 73002096 (Luther Place Memorial Church)

Significant dates
- Added to NRHP: July 16, 1973
- Designated CP: November 9, 1994
- Designated DCIHS: November 8, 1964 (Luther Place Memorial Church); July 16, 1973 (Greater Fourteenth Street Historic District)

The Luther Monument is a public artwork located in front of Luther Place Memorial Church in Washington, D.C., United States. The monument to Martin Luther, the theologian and Protestant Reformer, is a bronze, full-length portrait. It is a copy of the statue created by Ernst Friedrich August Rietschel as part of the 1868 Luther Monument in Worms, Germany. The version in Washington, D.C., inspired the installation of many other castings across the U.S. The statue is a contributing property to the Luther Place Memorial Church's listing on the National Register of Historic Places (NRHP) and District of Columbia Inventory of Historic Sites (DCIHS). It is also a contributing property to the Greater Fourteenth Street Historic District, which is also listed on the NRHP and DCIHS.

The plan to erect a statue began in 1883. A group of interested people formed an association and began a fundraising effort. The total cost of the statue and granite pedestal, designed by Adolf Cluss and Paul Schulze, was $9,000. It was hoped the statue would be ready for 400th anniversary of Luther's birth, but the project was not ready until 1884. The dedication ceremony was attended by thousands of onlookers and invited guests. A parade of German American societies also took place through downtown, ending at the church. The name of the church had been Memorial Evangelical Lutheran Church of Washington, D.C., but after the statue was installed, it was later nicknamed and then formally renamed to the current Luther Place Memorial Church.

== History ==
=== Memorial plan ===
The idea for erecting a statue in honor of Martin Luther, who was responsible for the Protestant Reformation and Lutheranism, was first mentioned by Charles A. Schieru of New York. Schieru told a reporter from the Lutheran Observer, whose bureau was in Washington, D.C., and the idea soon spread amongst Lutheran pastors throughout the area. An association was formed to erect a statue. On Valentine's Day, 1883, an image of the proposed statue was printed in Lutheran newspapers. The Luther Place Memorial Church, then named the Memorial Evangelical Lutheran Church of Washington, D.C., suggested the statue be placed in front of its church. Donations soon arrived, and by April 1883, the association had enough funds to erect the statue. The total cost for the statue was approximately $5,000, and the pedestal was $4,000.

Many people submitted designs for the statue's pedestal, and the architects chosen were Adolf Cluss and Paul Schulze. A.H. Jouvenal was chosen to construct the pedestal. The statue chosen to erect in Washington, D.C., was a copy of the Luther Monument in Worms, Germany. The replica was created in Lauchhammer, Prussia, and shipped to the U.S. It was then delivered from New York City to Washington, D.C., via the Baltimore and Ohio Railroad Company. The original plans were for the statue to be dedicated on the 400th anniversary of Luther's birth, November 10, 1883, but the unveiling was delayed until 1884.

=== Dedication ===
The night before the unveiling and dedication, there was a meeting at the church of the many guests of honors and members of the committee involved with the statue's installation. Another meeting took place the following morning, May 21, 1884, which was conducted in German. Attendees included the pastor, members of the statue association, and other pastors. The church's pastor read Psalm 46 followed by the singing of Now Thank We All Our God by the choir of St. John's Church. One of Luther's songs, A Mighty Fortress Is Our God, was sung in German ("Ein feste Burg ist unser Gott"). After that morning's event, crowds gathered to watch the unveiling ceremony. A parade composed of people from German American organizations took place, ending at the church. The group included 200 members of the Martin Luther Association, and many pastors, both local and from nearby states. A temporary platform had been built around the statue, with around 1,200 people in the stands. Dignitaries, including Supreme Court Justice Samuel Freeman Miller, were seated on a stage in front of the statue, which was draped with the U.S. flag.

The unveiling event began with the United States Marine Band playing The Creation. This was followed by a prayer and a speech about the statue's history, before the band played Organ Sonata. U.S. Senator Omar D. Conger and other gave additional speeches before the band played A Mighty Fortress Is Our God and the unveiling took place. During the unveiling, the temporary stands collapsed, sending hundreds of people into the crowd of 5,000 onlookers. The event ended with a prayer, and a reception took place that evening. The Luther statue became the city's first outdoor sculpture of a religious figure and was the first public monument of Luther erected in the U.S.

=== Later history ===
Luther Place Memorial Church received its commonly known name after the Luther statue was installed. Before that, it was Memorial English Lutheran Church and then the Memorial Evangelical Lutheran Church of Washington, D.C. The "memorial" in the church's name was chosen because the congregation was founded not long after the Civil War, and it was a way for the church to celebrate the end of the conflict and the end of slavery. After the statue was installed in Washington, D.C., there were many other replicas of the statue installed throughout the country.

On November 8, 1964, the church was added to the District of Columbia Inventory of Historic Sites (DCIHS). The statue is a contributing property to the church's listing. On July 16, 1973, the church was added to the National Register of Historic Places (NRHP). The statue and church were designated as contributing properties to the Greater Fourteenth Street Historic District, listed on the DCIHS on August 22, 1994, and the NRHP on November 9, 1994. The statue and church were two of many local landmarks that were vandalized with paint and feces in 2013.

== Location and design ==
The statue is located on Square 244, a triangular lot bounded by 14th Street, N Street, Thomas Circle, and Vermont Avenue NW. The statue is on the front yard of the church's property with the facade's tower in the background. It faces Thomas Circle, one of the main traffic circles in the city. The statue is sited just behind one of four triangular lots around Thomas Circle that are administered by the National Park Service.

The bronze statue of Luther is 11.5-feet (3.5 m) tall. The granite pedestal it rests on is 14-feet (4.3 m) tall and its diameter is 11.5 feet. Luther is depicted not as a monk, but as a preacher, wearing a long robe. His right leg is forward from his body. He is holding a Bible with his left hand and has his right fist resting on the book. He is looking up slightly, appearing defiant, and his curly hair partly covers his face. The setting for the statue was his excommunication trial at the Diet of Worms in 1521. The pedestal is composed of three tiers. It contains a copper box with a Bible, documents on Luther and the statue, and other papers. The box was hermetically sealed inside the pedestal in 1884.

Inscriptions on the monument include "MARTIN LUTHER" on the front of the statue and the German inscription "E. RIETSCHEL FACIT. GEGOSSEN LAUCHHAMMER 1884" on the rear side.

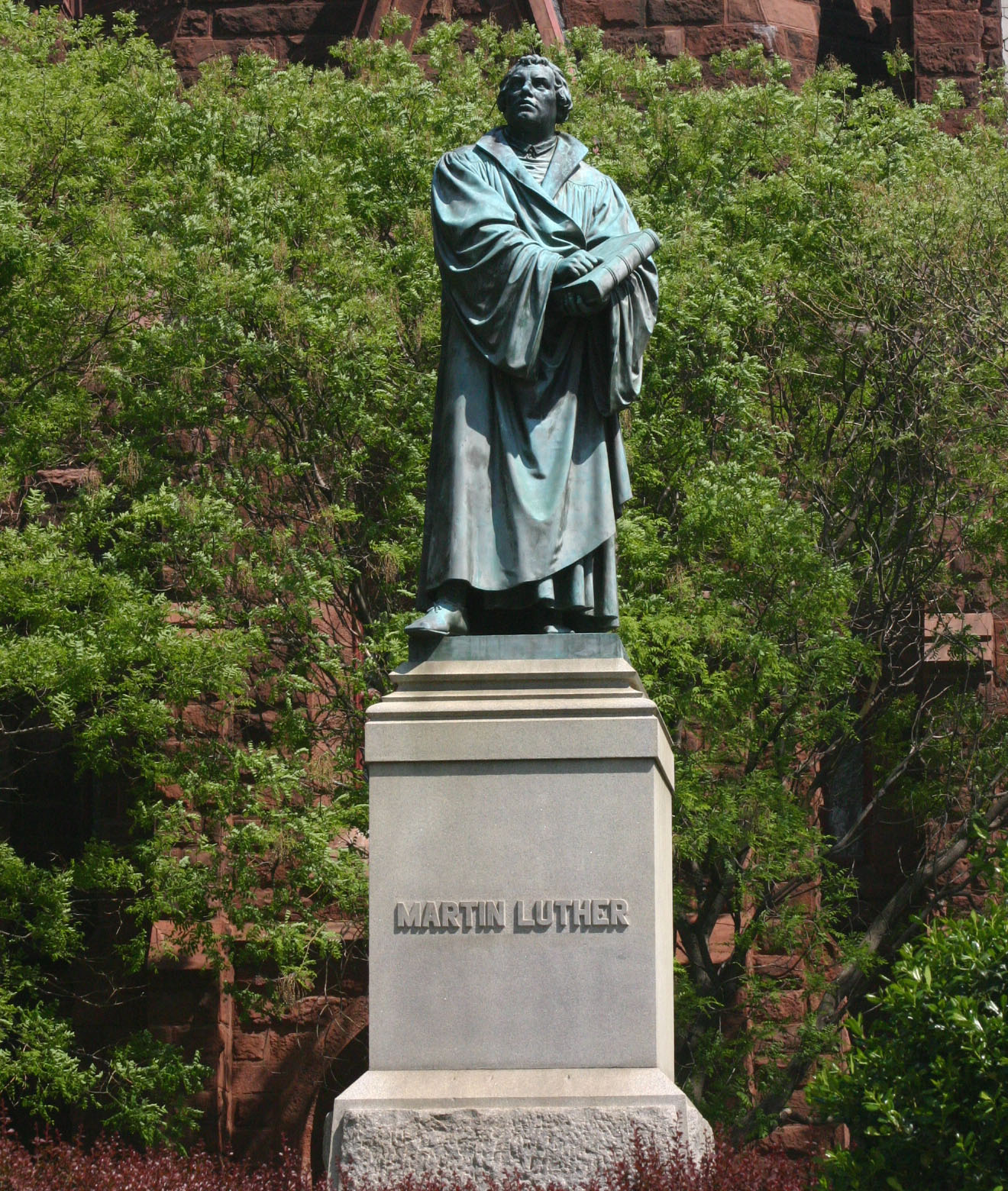
Statue and pedestal

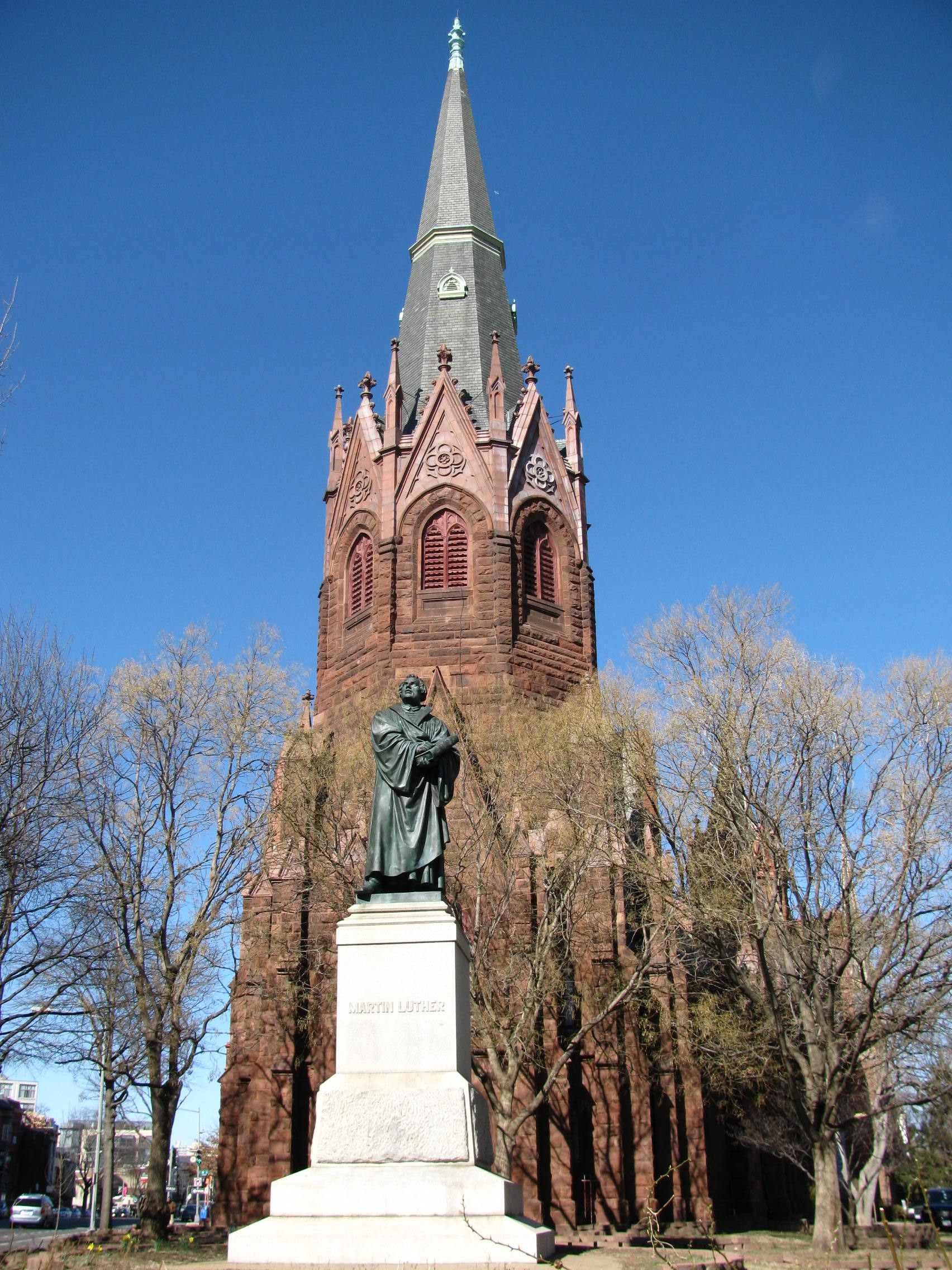
The statue and church tower

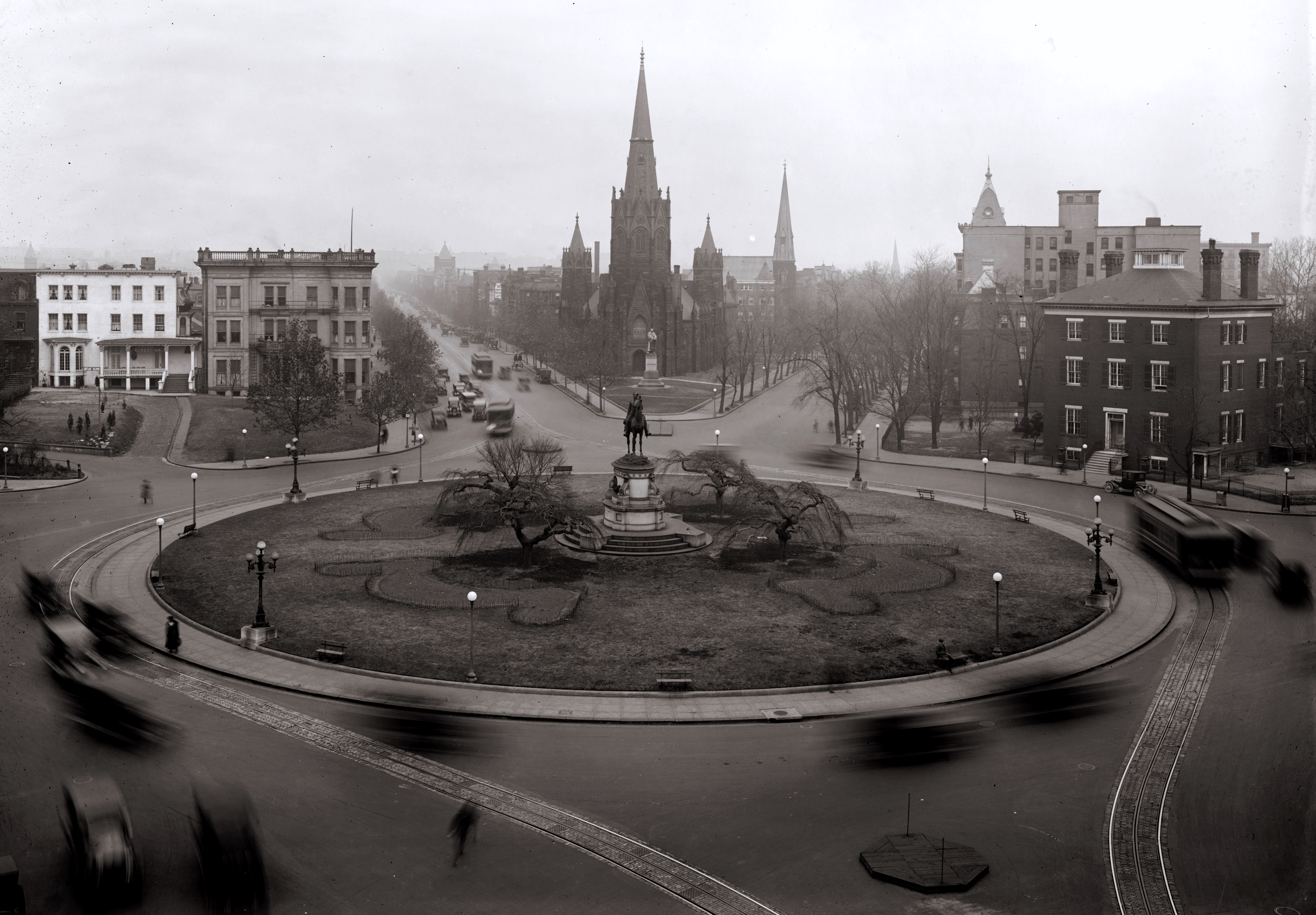
Thomas Circle in 1922 with Luther Place Memorial Church and the Luther statue in the background

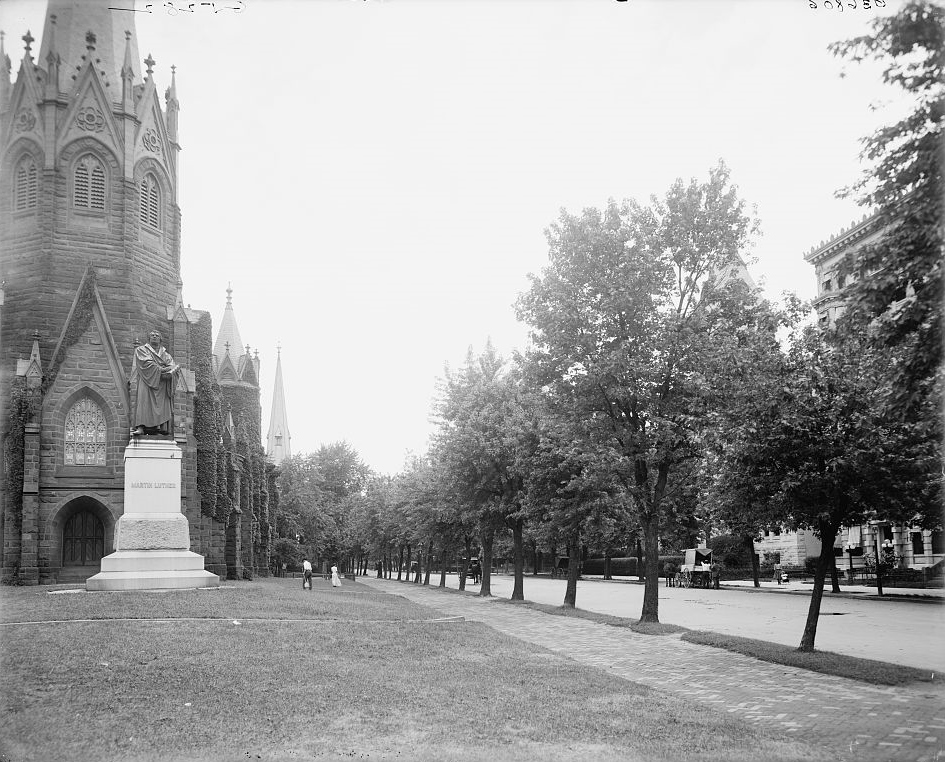
The statue in the early 20th-century

== See also ==
- List of public art in Washington, D.C., Ward 2
- National Register of Historic Places listings in Washington, D.C.
- Outdoor sculpture in Washington, D.C.
