= Adolf von Donndorf =

German sculptor

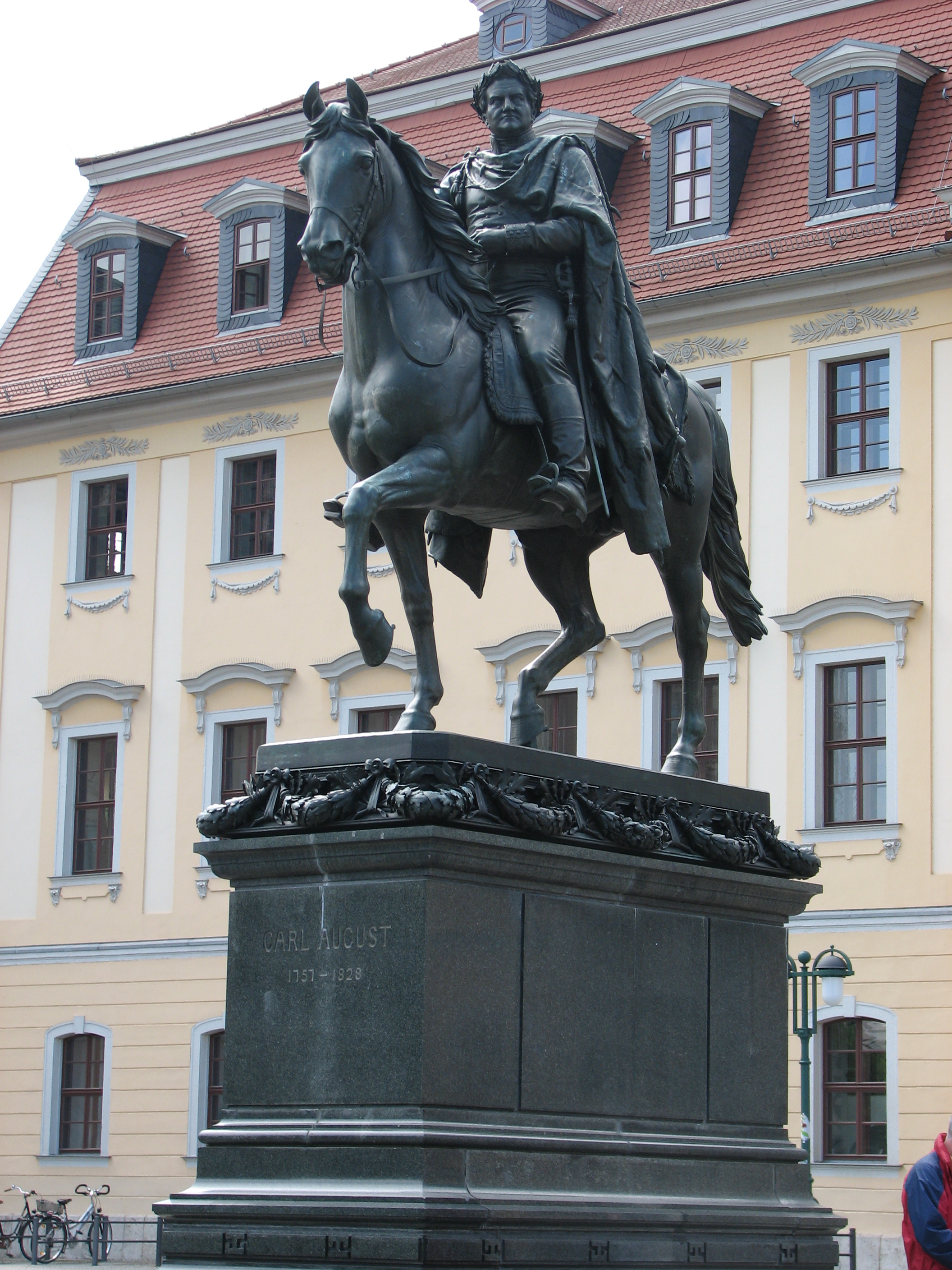
Equestrian statue of Charles Augustus, Grand Duke of Saxe-Weimar-Eisenach, Weimar, (1867-75)

Adolf von Donndorf (16 February 1835 – 20 December 1916) was a German sculptor.

== Life ==
Adolf Donndorf was born in Weimar, the son of a cabinet-maker. Starting in 1853 he was a student of Ernst Rietschel in Dresden. After Rietschel's death in 1861, he and Gustav Adolph Kietz completed the large Luther Monument in Worms, Germany. Donndorf contributed several statues including standing figures of Reuchlin and Frederick the Wise, seated figures of Savonarola, Peter Waldo and the allegorical town of Magdeburg as well as reliefs. His talents as a sculptor were recognized on 12 November 1864 when he was named an honorary member of the Dresden Academy of Arts and in 1876 he was appointed professor of sculpture at the Stuttgart Academy of Arts.

Adolf von Donndorf was an honorary citizen of Weimar and Stuttgart and was ennobled in 1910 allowing him to add "von" to his name. A museum created in his honor in 1907 by the city of Weimar was destroyed at the end of World War II.

His son Karl August Donndorf (1870–1941) was also a sculptor and one of his father's students.

Adolf von Donndorf died in Stuttgart.

== Work ==
- Equestrian statue of Charles Augustus, Grand Duke of Saxe-Weimar-Eisenach in Weimar, 1867–1875
- Luther Monument on the Nikolaiplatz in Eisenach, 1889–1895. With accompanying figures of Savonarola, Mourning Magdeburg, Frederick the Wise, Peter Waldo and Reuchlin
- Angel of the Resurrection at Rheineck Castle, 1877
- Bronze bust of Ferdinand Freiligrath (cast by Georg Ferdinand Howaldt) in the Uff-Kirchhof in Bad Cannstatt (Stuttgart), 1877–1879
- Peter von Cornelius statue in Düsseldorf, erected and unveiled 1879
- Robert Schumann marble grave monument in the Old Cemetery in Bonn, 1880
- Kesstner family monument, Dresden.

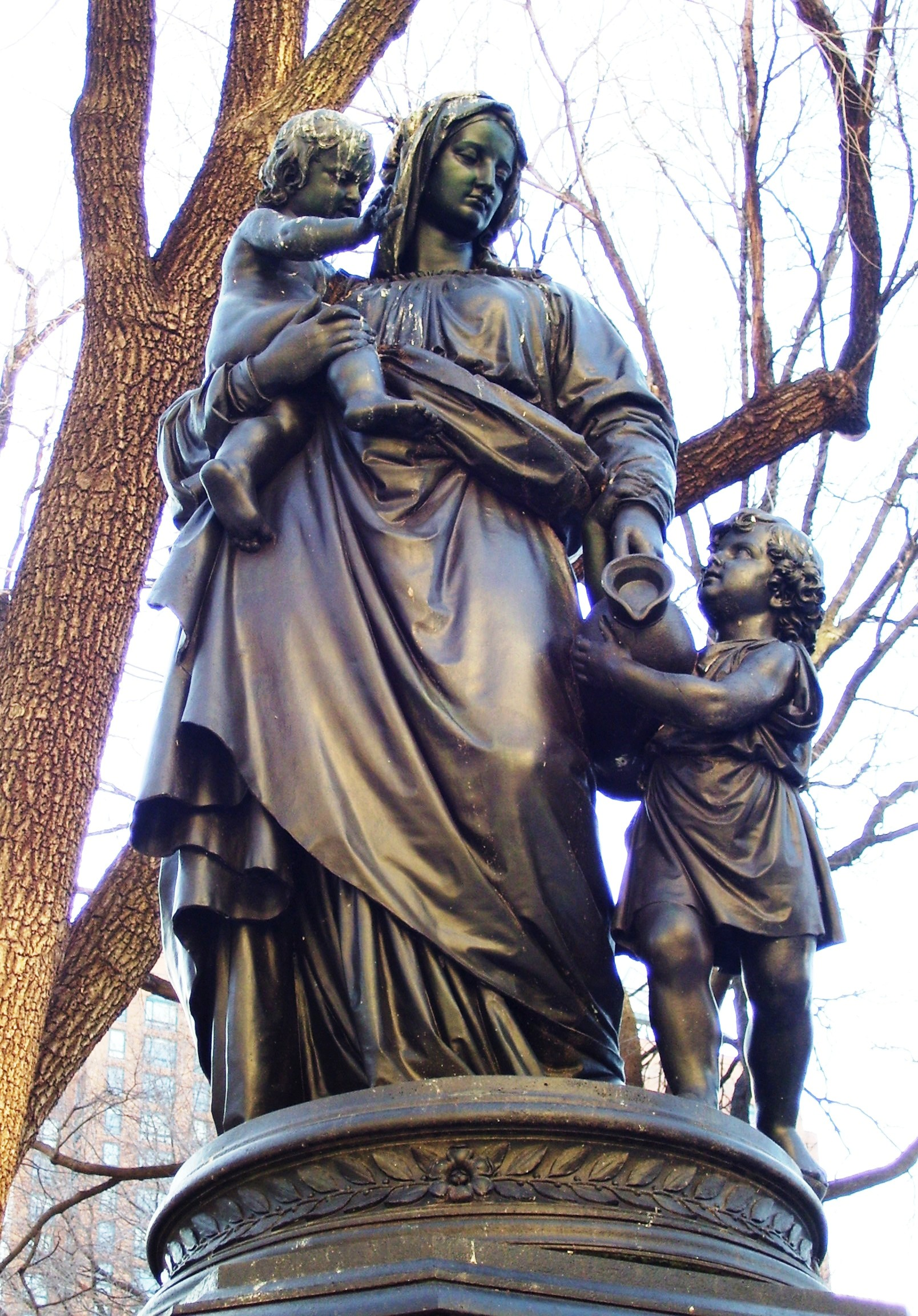
James Fountain (1881)

- Figural group of mother and two children:
  - Union Square Drinking Fountain also called the James Fountain, Union Square, New York City, 1881. A standing draped female figure combining common iconic representations of Charity and of Temperance holds an infant and empties a ewer with her left hand, aided by a boy. Lion-mask spouts on the block base spit water into basins.
  - Maternal Love Fountain, Zwittau, 1892
  - Donndorf Fountain, Weimar 1895
  - Pauline Fountain, Stuttgart 1898 (destroyed during World War I, restored in 2008)
- Johann Sebastian Bach statue in Eisenach, originally (1884) on the marketplace in front of the Georgenkirche, since 1938 on the Frauenplan adjacent to the Bachhaus
- Burschenschaft Memorial in Jena, 1877–1883
- Busts of Moltke and Bismarck for the Alte Nationalgalerie, Berlin, 1889
- Kaiser Wilhelm I equestrian statue and companion figures at the Kaiser Wilhelm I Memorial on the Hohensyburg in Dortmund, 1897–1902
- Friedrich Schiller Monument at the Württembergischen Staatstheater in Stuttgart, 1913
- Bust of Otto von Bismarck on the Bismarckplatz in Heidelberg
- Monument for Karl Anton, Prince of Hohenzollern in Sigmaringen, 1890
- Goethe Monument in Karlsbad, 1883
- Luther statue in front of the Dresden Frauenkirche, 1885

== Bibliography ==
- Thieme, Ulrich (1913). Allegemeines Lexikon der Bildenden Künstler. Leipzig: E.A. Seemann.
- Saur (2001). Allegemeines Künstlerlexicon. München: K.G. Saur Verlag.
- Rosenberg, Adolf (1889). Geschichte der modernen Kunst. F.W. Grunoal.
