= Ernst Friedrich August Rietschel =

German sculptor (1804–1861)

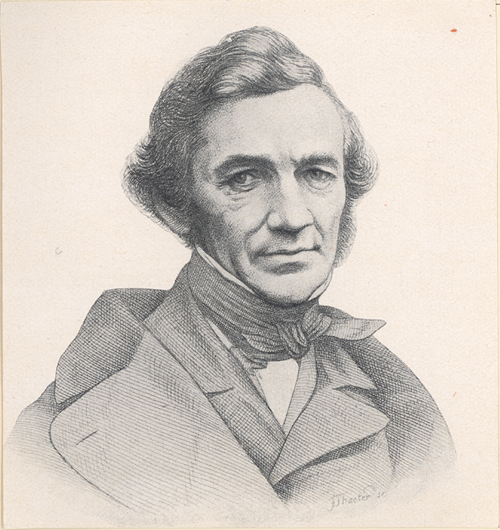
- Born: 15 December 1804; Pulsnitz, Saxony
- Died: 21 January 1861 (aged 56); Dresden
- Notable work: Luther Monument

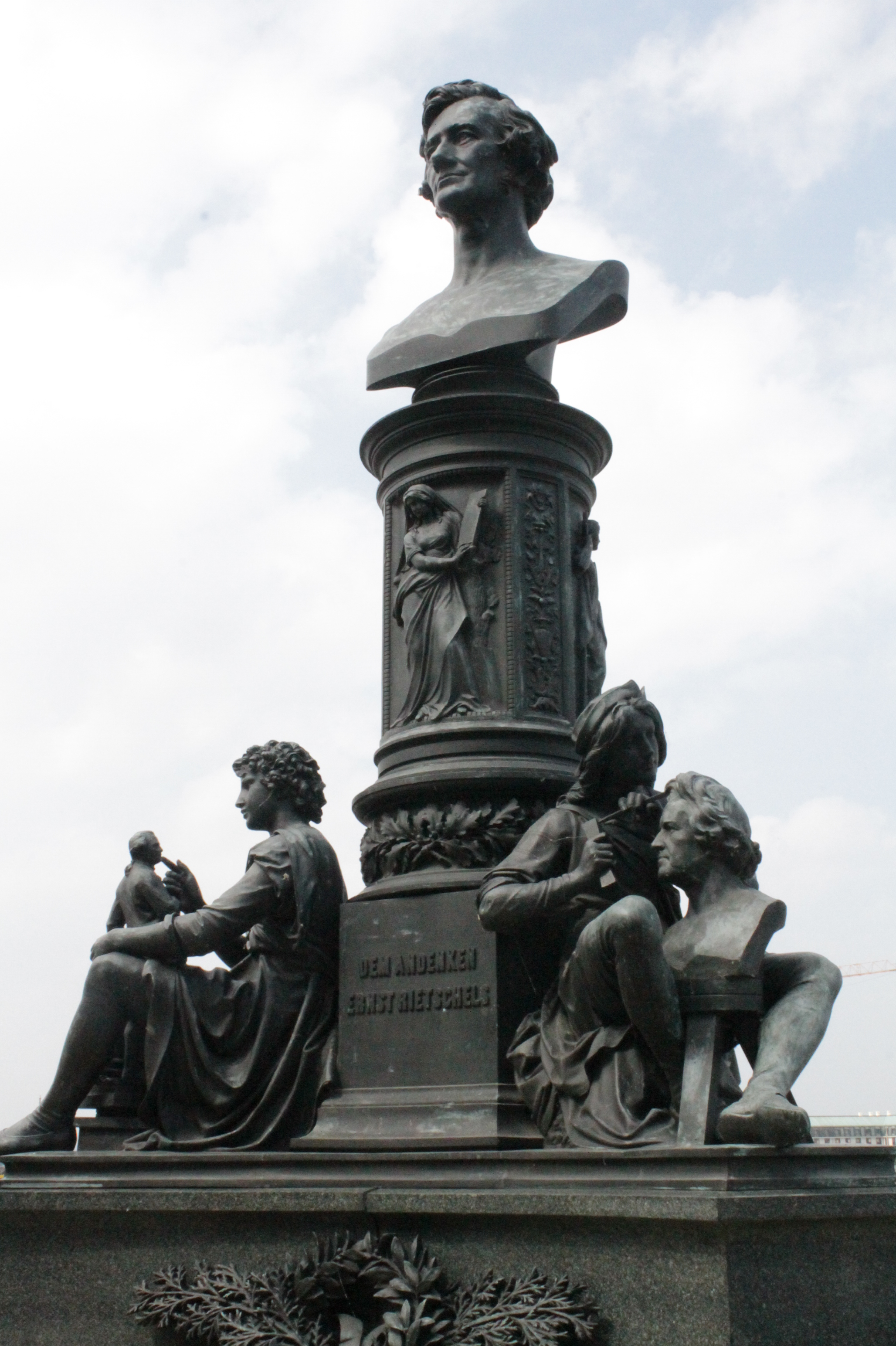
Monument to Ernst Rietschel by Johannes Schilling, Bruhl's Terrace, Dresden

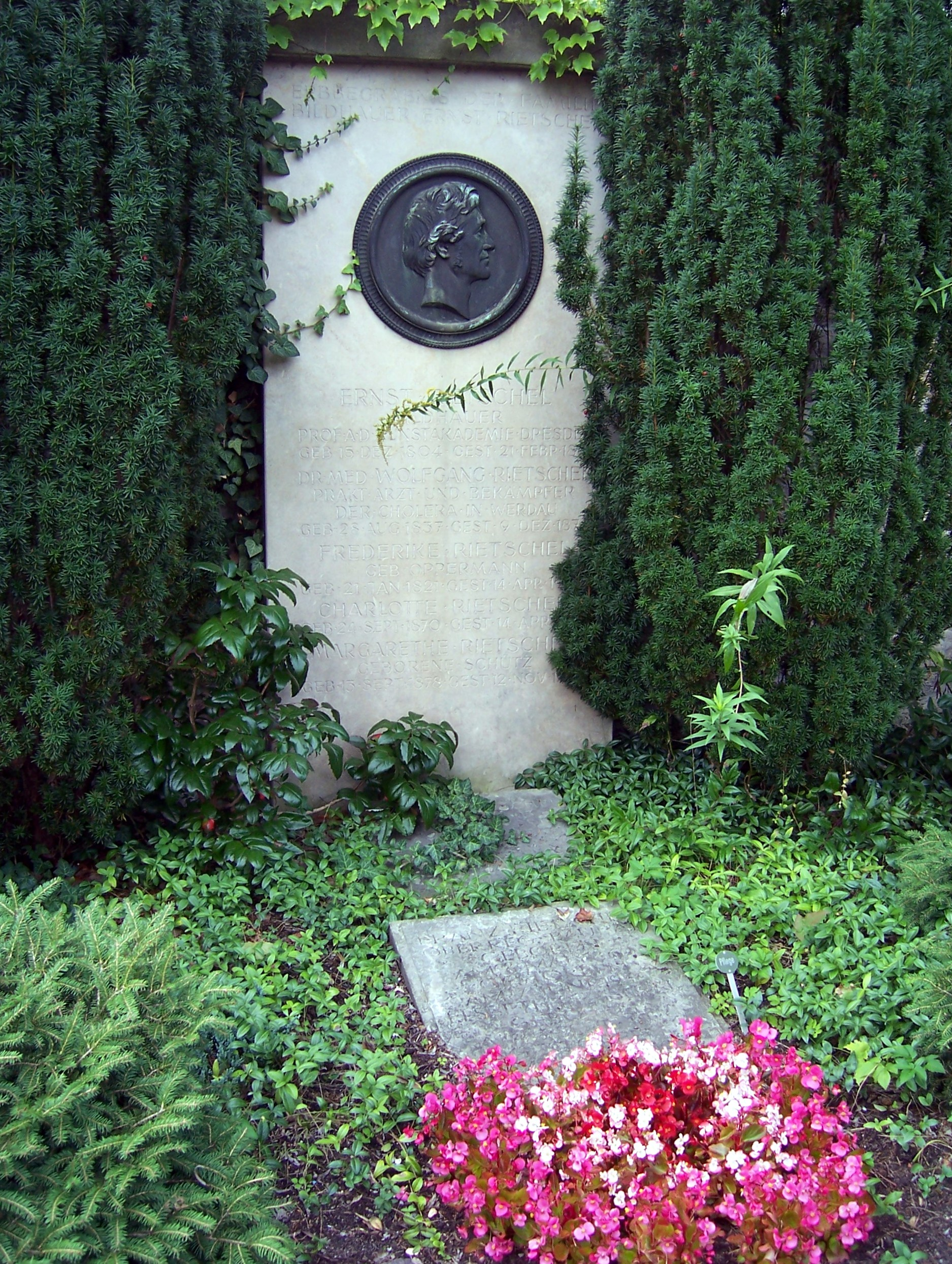
Rietschel's grave at Trinitatisfriedhof in Dresden, sculpture by Adolf von Donndorf, his disciple.

Ernst Friedrich August Rietschel (15 December 1804 – 21 January 1861) was a German sculptor.

== Life ==
Rietschel was born in Pulsnitz in Saxony the third child of Friedrich Ehrgott Rietschel and his wife Caroline.

From the age of 20 he became an art student at Dresden, and from 1826 was a pupil of Rauch in Berlin. He there gained an art studentship, and studied in Rome in 1827–28. After returning to Saxony, he soon brought himself into notice by a colossal statue of Frederick Augustus, King of Saxony; was elected a member of the academy of Dresden, and became one of the chief sculptors of his country. In 1832 he was elected to the Dresden professorship of sculpture, and had many foreign orders of merit conferred on him by the governments of different countries.

He died in Dresden in 1861 aged 56. He is buried in the Trinitatisfriedhof, north-east of the city centre.

== Family ==
He married three times.

Firstly in 1832 to Albertine Trautscholdt. In 1836 he married Charlotte Carus daughter of Carl Gustav Carus. Finally in 1841 he married Marie Hand (1819–1847).

From the third marriage he had a son Georg Rietschel.

== Style and sculptures ==
Rietschel's style was very varied; he produced works imbued with much religious feeling, and to some extent he occupied the same place as a sculptor that Overbeck did in painting. Other important works by him were purely classical in style. He was specially famed for his portrait figures of eminent men, treated with much idealism and dramatic vigour; among the latter class his chief works were colossal statues of Goethe and Schiller for the a monument in Weimar, of Weber for Dresden and of Lessing for Braunschweig cast by Georg Howaldt. He also designed the Luther Monument in Worms, Germany, and created two of its many statues, but died before it was completed.

The principal among Rietschel's religious pieces of sculpture are the well-known Christ-Angel, and a life-sized Piet, executed for the king of Prussia. He also worked a great deal in rilievo, and produced many graceful pieces, especially a fine series of bas-reliefs representing "Night and Morning" and "Noon and Twilight".

== Gallery ==
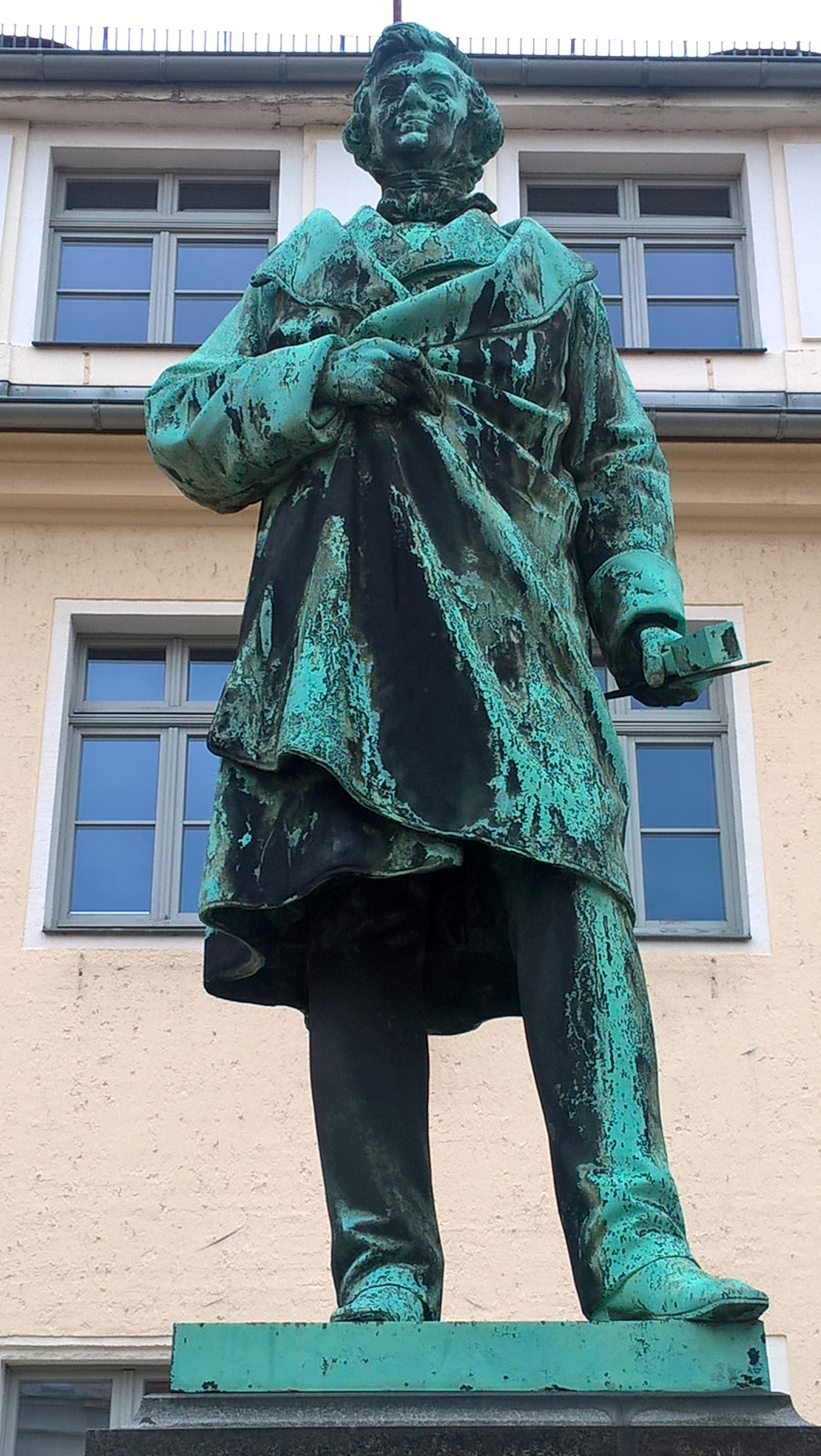
Rietschel Monument Pulsnitz - Saxony - Market Square

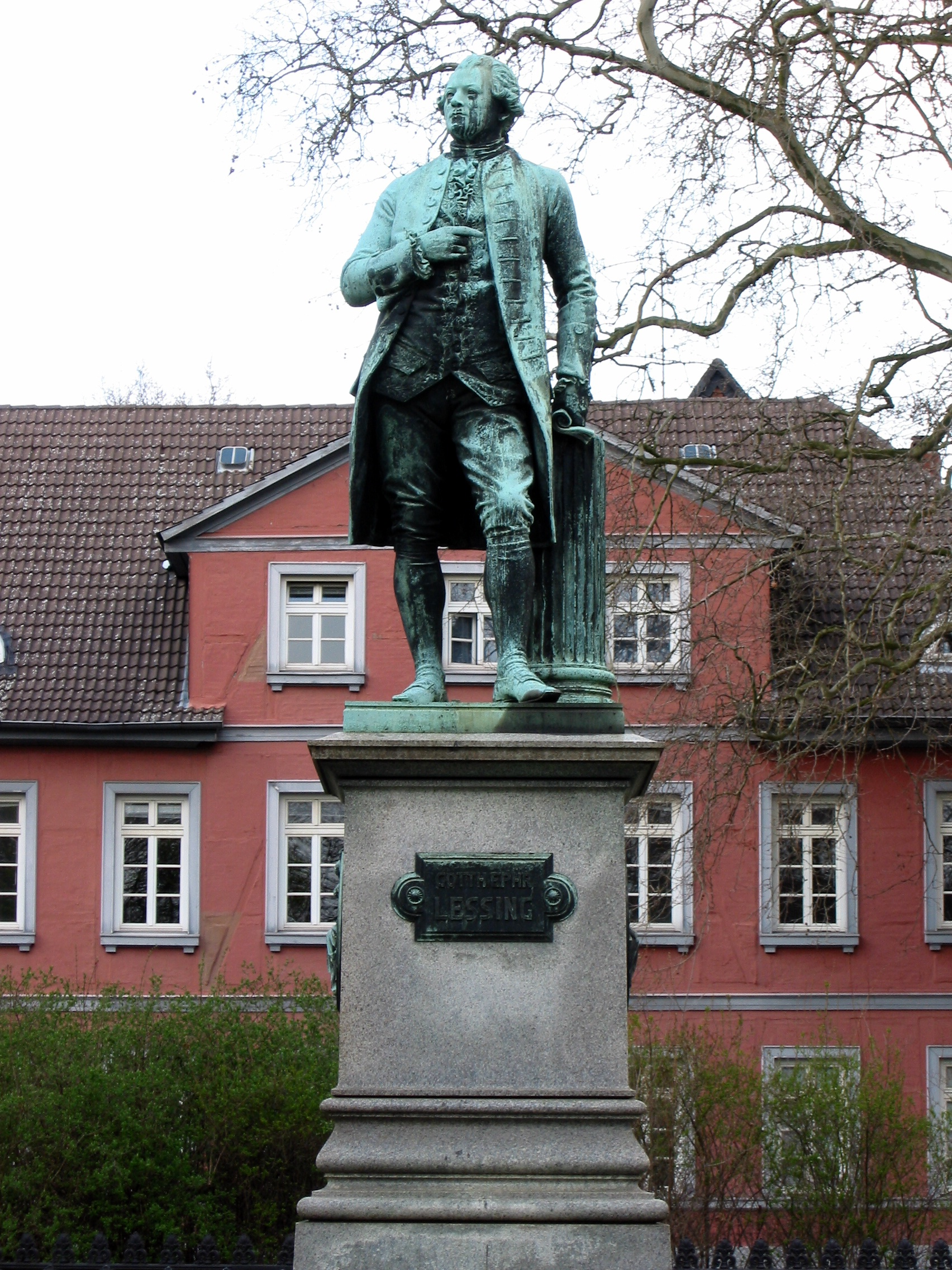
Lessing Monument (German: Lessing-Denkmal) in Braunschweig; cast by Georg Ferdinand Howaldt.

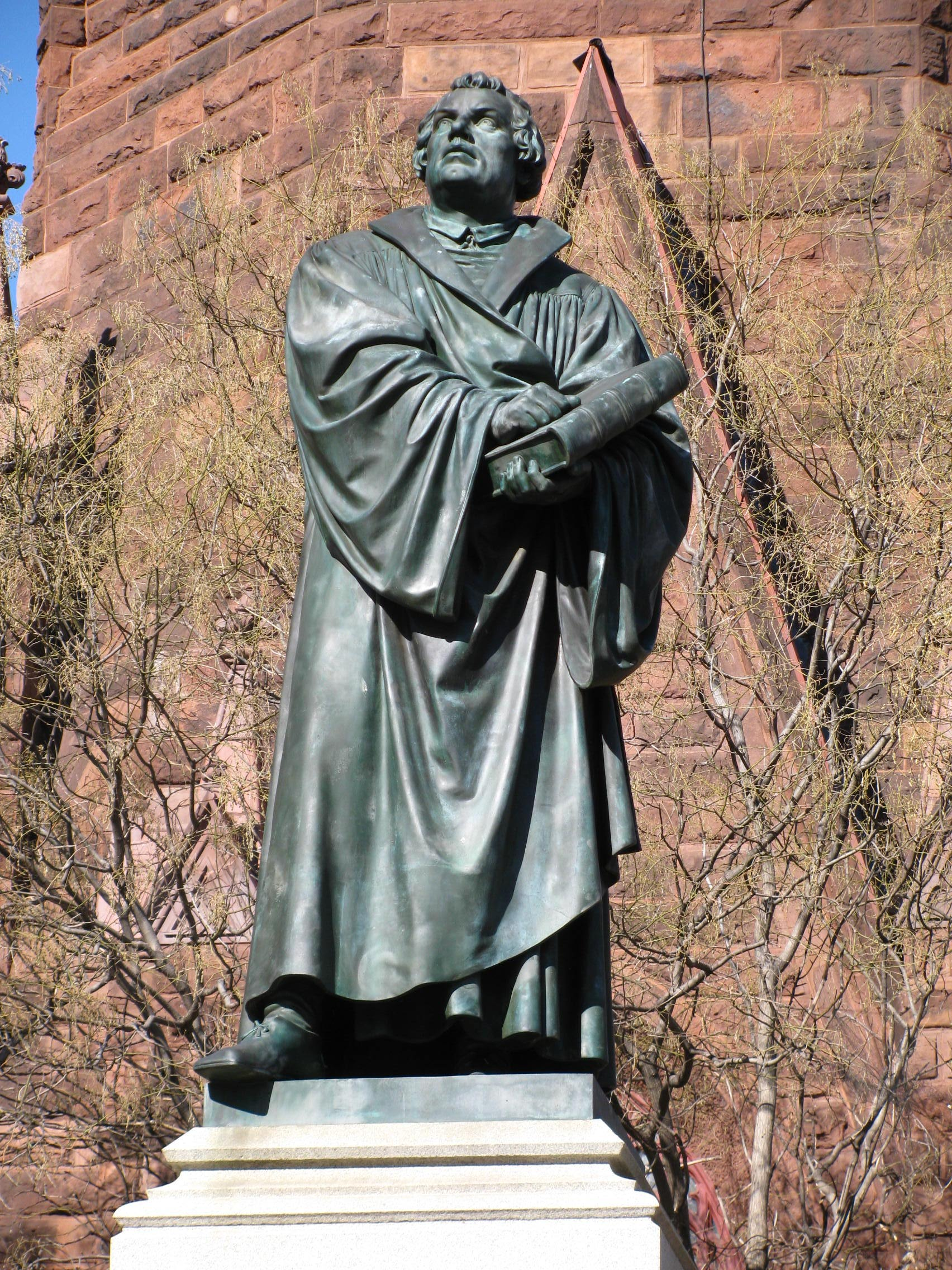
Luther Monument in Washington, D.C., copy of Rietschel's work in Worms.

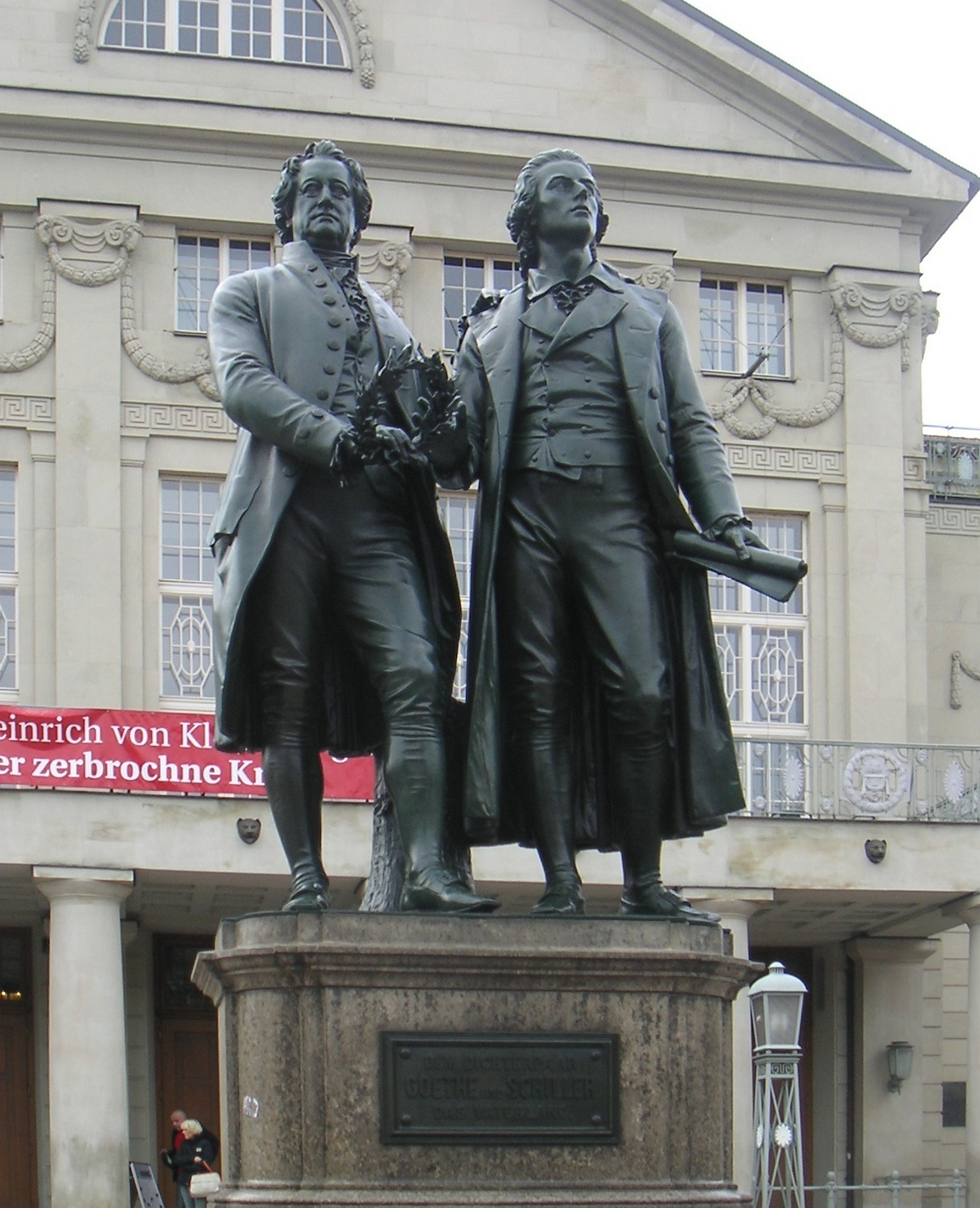
Goethe–Schiller Monument in Weimar.

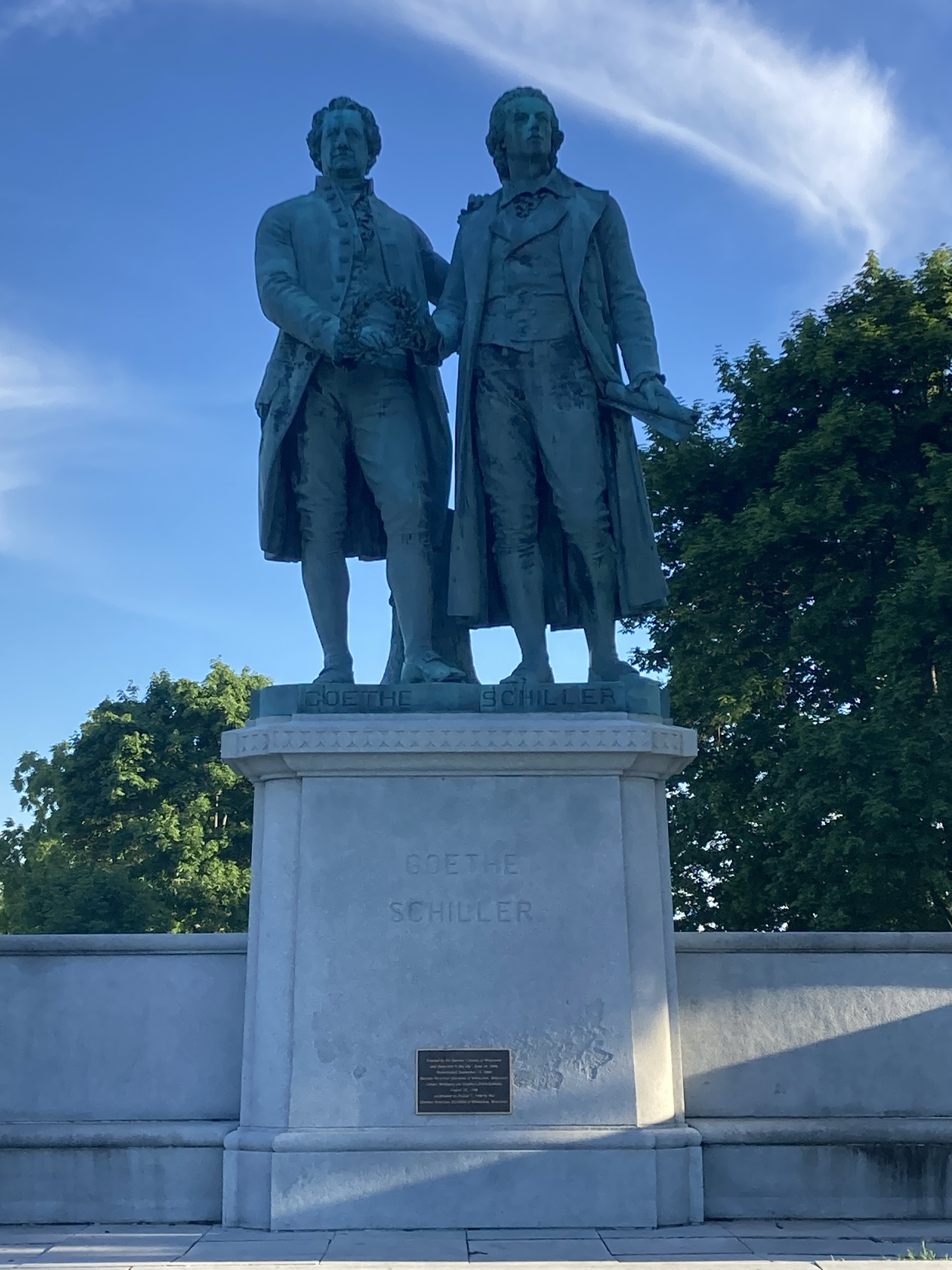
Goethe–Schiller Monument in Milwaukee
