= Goethe Monument =

Goethe Monument may refer to:

- Goethe Monument (Berlin), Berlin, Germany
- Goethe Monument (Leipzig), Leipzig, Germany
- Goethe–Schiller Monument, Germany
- Goethe–Schiller Monument (Milwaukee) in Milwaukee, Wisconsin, United States
