= Electrotyping =

Chemical method for forming metal parts

Schematic apparatus for electrotyping. An electric current flows from the battery, through the copper anode, the electrolyte, and the coated mold. A copper film (the electrotype) grows onto the electrically conducting coating of the mold.

Electrotyping (also galvanoplasty) is a chemical method for forming metal parts that exactly reproduce a model. The method was first experimented by the Italian physicist Luigi Valentino Brugnatelli in 1802. It was later reinvented and developed by a Prussian engineer Moritz von Jacobi in Russia in 1838, and was immediately adopted for applications in printing and several other fields. As described in an 1890 treatise, electrotyping produces "an exact facsimile of any object having an irregular surface, whether it be an engraved steel- or copper-plate, a wood-cut, or a form of set-up type, to be used for printing; or a medal, medallion, statue, bust, or even a natural object, for art purposes."

In art, several important "bronze" sculptures created in the 19th century are actually electrotyped copper, and not bronze at all; sculptures were executed using electrotyping at least into the 1930s. In printing, electrotyping had become a standard method for producing plates for letterpress printing by the late 1800s. It complemented the older technology of stereotyping, which involved metal casting. By 1901, stereotypers and electrotypers in several countries had formed labor unions around these crafts. The unions persisted into the 1970s, but by the late 20th century, after more than a century in widespread use for preparing plates, the two technologies had been bypassed by the transitions to offset printing and to new techniques for the preparation of printing plates.

== Technical description ==
As with metal casting and stereotyping, a mold is first formed from the model. Since electrotyping involves wet chemical processes and is done near room temperature, the molding material can be soft. Materials such as wax, gutta-percha (natural latex), and ultimately ozokerite were used. The mold's surface is made electrically conducting by coating it very thinly with fine graphite powder or paint. A wire is attached to the conducting surface, and the mold is suspended in an electrolyte solution.

Electrotyping is activated by electric currents that flow between anode wires that are also immersed in the solution and the wire connected to the coated mold (the cathode). For copper electrotyping, a typical aqueous electrolyte contains copper sulfate (CuSO_{4}) and sulfuric acid (H_{2}SO_{4}), and the anode is also copper; the arrangement is illustrated in the figure. The electric current causes copper atoms to dissolve from the anode's surface and to enter the electrolyte as copper ions (Cu^{++} in the figure). Copper ions are taken up by the mold's conducting surface at the same rate at which copper dissolves from the anode, thus completing the electrical circuit. When the copper layer on the mold grows to the desired thickness, the electric current is stopped. The mold and its attached electrotype are removed from the solution, and the electrotype and the mold are separated. An animation of the electrotyping process was produced in 2011 by the Metropolitan Museum of Art. Other metals besides copper can be electrotyped; similar procedures apply, but each different metal needs its own anode and electrolyte chemicals.

There is a second type of electrotyping that has been used in which the copper film is deposited onto the outside of a form, and is not separated from it. In this use the form is typically waterproofed plaster, which remains as a core after electrotyping. In German this method is known as Kerngalvanoplastik; the more usual technique described in the previous paragraph is known as Hohlgalvanoplastik.

Electrotyping is related to electroplating, which permanently adds a thin metallic overlayer to a metallic object instead of creating a freestanding metal part. Electrotyping and electroforming both produce metal parts, but differ in technical details. Electroforming involves the production of a metallic part around a metallic mandrel, although the term is sometimes used more broadly to encompass all electrodeposition processes. As noted above, electrotyping forms the part using a non-conducting mold or form whose surface has been made conducting by applying a thin coating of graphite or metal powder.

== Invention and subsequent developments ==
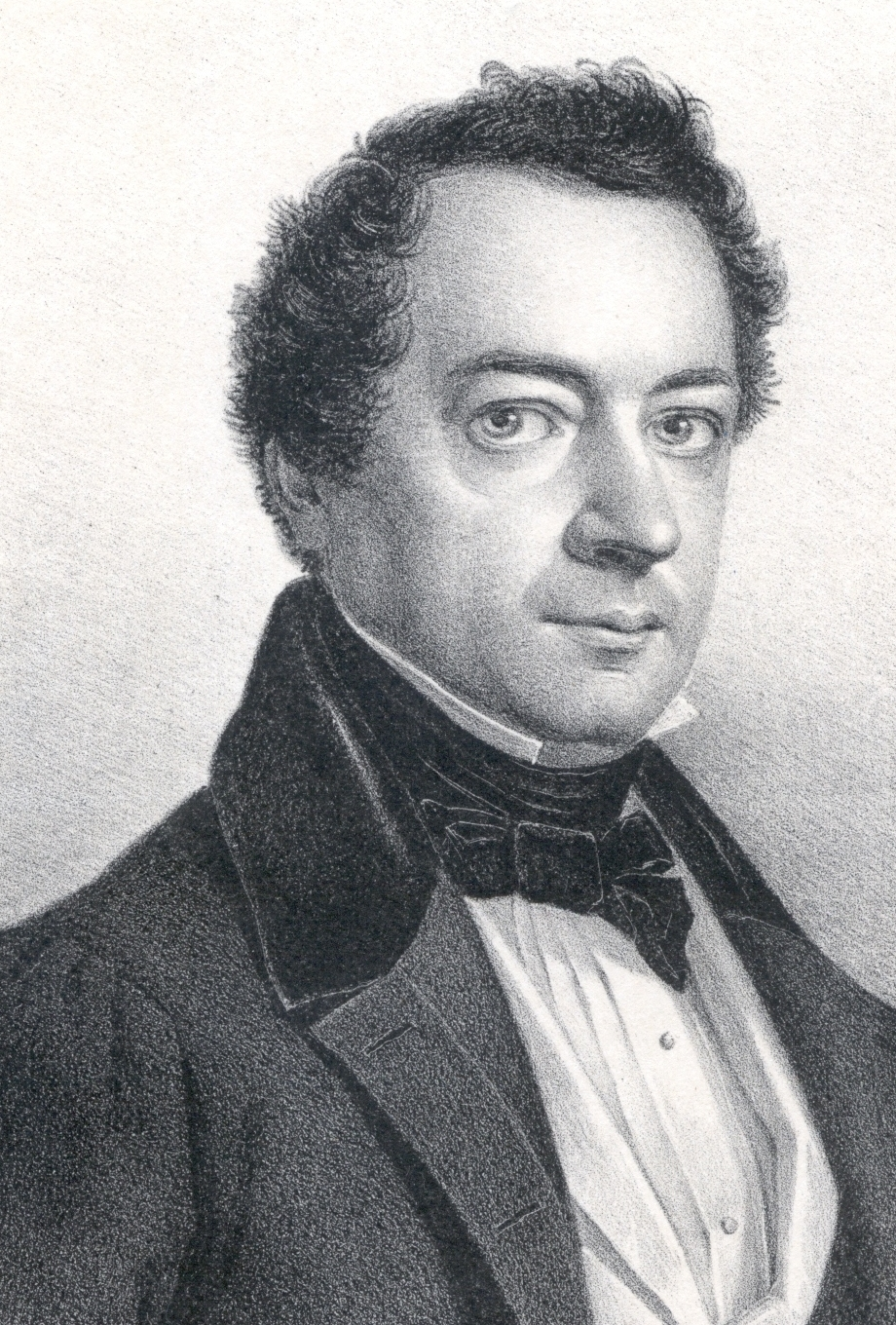
1837 lithographic portrait of Moritz von Jacobi (1801–1874), who invented electrotyping in 1838.

At present, most sources credit Moritz Hermann Jacobi with the invention of "galvanoplasty" or electrotyping in 1838; Jacobi was a Prussian scientist who was working in St. Petersburg, Russia. Nineteenth-century accounts often credited Thomas Spencer or C. J. Jordan with the invention in England, or Joseph Alexander Adams in the United States; Heinrich in particular gave a thorough account of the controversies surrounding the crediting of the invention, along with a short biography of Jacobi, in an article honoring the centennial of electrotyping in 1938.

The electrotyping industry was limited for some decades by the sources of the electric currents needed to activate the deposition of metal films into the mold; the rate of film growth is proportional to the magnitude of this current. In the initial work, the Daniell cell was used to provide these currents. The Daniell cell was largely replaced by the Smee cell (amalgamated zinc and platinized silver in sulfuric acid) after the latter's invention by Alfred Smee in 1840. Both of these cells are forerunners of contemporary electrical batteries. By the 1870s, mechanical generators were being used; the larger currents that could be sustained by generators enabled substantial increases in the rate of metal deposition during electrotyping.

== Electrotyping in printing ==
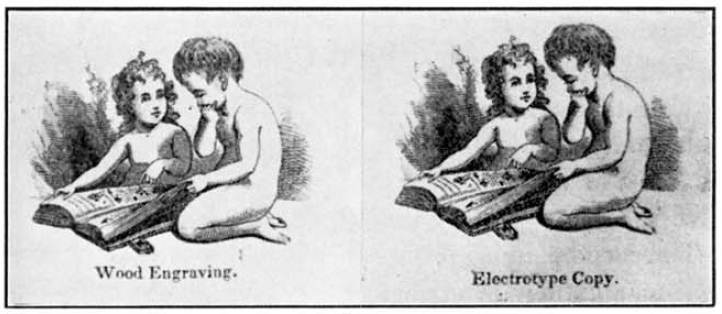
1841 magazine illustration by Joseph Alexander Adams. The illustration compares direct letterpress printing from a wood carving and from a copper electrotype copy of the carving; it is among the earliest uses of electrotypes in printing.

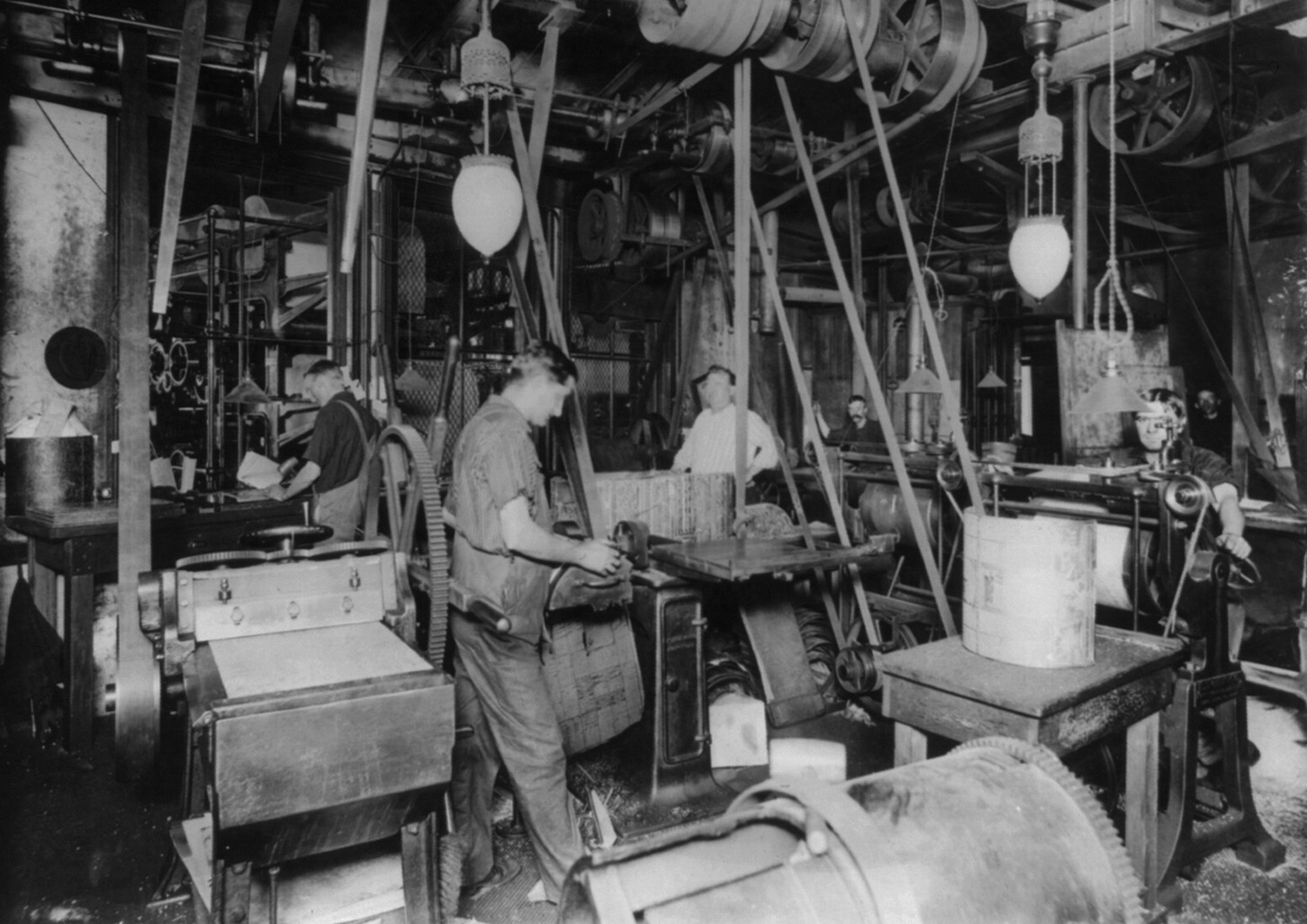
The electrotyping department of the New York Herald in 1902.

One of the first applications of electrotyping was in printing. Initially, electrotyping was used to make copper reproductions of engraved metal plates or wooden carvings, which were used to print artwork. The electrotypes could be incorporated along with movable type to compose the formes for printing. Jacobi published his first account of electrotyping in October 1838. In 1839, electrotyping was used by Russian printers for government documents; the Russian Czar Nicholas I had immediately become an enthusiastic supporter and patron of the technology. In England, the first use of electrotyping for printing appeared in the London Journal of April 1840, and other English examples are known from later in that year. The image to the right shows one of the earliest uses of electrotyping in the United States; it is a comparison done by Joseph Alexander Adams in 1841 of the printed image prepared directly from a wood carving and of the image printed from a copper electrotype copy. Electrotyped copper plates could be formed into cylinders, which was valuable for use in magazine and newspaper printing.

Electrotyping was also used to produce entire printing plates directly from the formes composed from movable type and illustrations. In this application, electrotyping was a higher quality but more costly alternative to stereotyping, which involved casting of type metal into a mold prepared from the forme. Stereotyping had been invented around 1725, and was already well-established when electrotyping was invented in 1838. Both methods yielded plates that could be preserved in case of future needs, for example in the printing of novels and other books of unpredictable popularity. The movable type used to compose the original forme could then be re-used. Both methods could be used to prepare curved plates for rotary presses, which were used for the longest print runs. The widespread adoption of electrotyping for this use occurred after mechanical electrical generators (dynamos) became commonly available around 1872. These generators supplanted the whole rooms of chemical batteries (Smee cells) that were previously used to provide electricity for electrotyping. Batteries did not have the electrical capacity needed to rapidly deposit the electrotype (or "electro"). The advent of plating dynamos sped up electrotyping twenty times or more, so that an electrotype printing plate could be deposited in less than two hours. In addition, the chemical batteries gave off toxic fumes that had required their isolation in separate rooms.

Electrotype was also used to manufacture matrices that could be used as moulds for individual pieces of metal type. This had several advantages over conventional punchcutting in hard steel: only soft metal was needed for carving the type master, which was also useful for large sizes of type, since it was hard to drive large punches into a matrix effectively. It cut the cost of decorative types that would not be used as often as body text typefaces. On the other hand, it gave no steel punch that could be used to create multiple matrices quickly, and was reported not always to give such good results as steel punchcutting.

Electrotyping was used for general-purpose type manufacture in the nineteenth century, but was a somewhat disreputable process, leading to some typefounders disdaining it (or at least claiming to). This was because it could be used just as easily to pirate another company's type as for an original design. (It was also used to revive older typefaces in cases where original punches had not survived but matrices or type had, and so sometimes for licensed copying of typefaces in order to send matrices to other countries.)

By the 1900s printing plants often incorporated electrotyping and stereotyping departments, and electrotyping and stereotyping had become trades with associated apprenticeships. In the United Kingdom, the National Society of Electrotypers and Stereotypers (NSES) formed in 1893, and continued to 1967 when it amalgamated with the National Graphic Association. In the US and Canada, the International Stereotypers and Electrotypers Union (ISEU) was formed in 1902; previously, electrotypers had belonged to the International Typographer's Union (ITU). In 1925 there were 6800 members, and in 1955 10,500. In 1973 the ISEU was absorbed into the International Printing and Graphic Communications Union. In 1978, an Occupational Outlook Handbook reported that 2000 electrotypers and stereotypers were employed in the US. However, job prospects were reported as poor. Offset printing has supplanted letterpress printing in most printing plants; the last letterpress facility for a newspaper was installed in the 1980s. For offset printing, the printing plates are typically prepared by coating them with light-sensitive materials, and creating the image on the plate by direct optical exposure (the photo-offset process); stereotyping and electrotyping are not used.

A slight problem with electrotyping of type is that the new form is slightly smaller than the original, and this deviance could accumulate if a letterform was repeatedly regenerated. Stephenson Blake's solution was to squash type slightly in a press or file it down to broaden it before putting it into the electrotype bath.

== Electrotyping in art ==
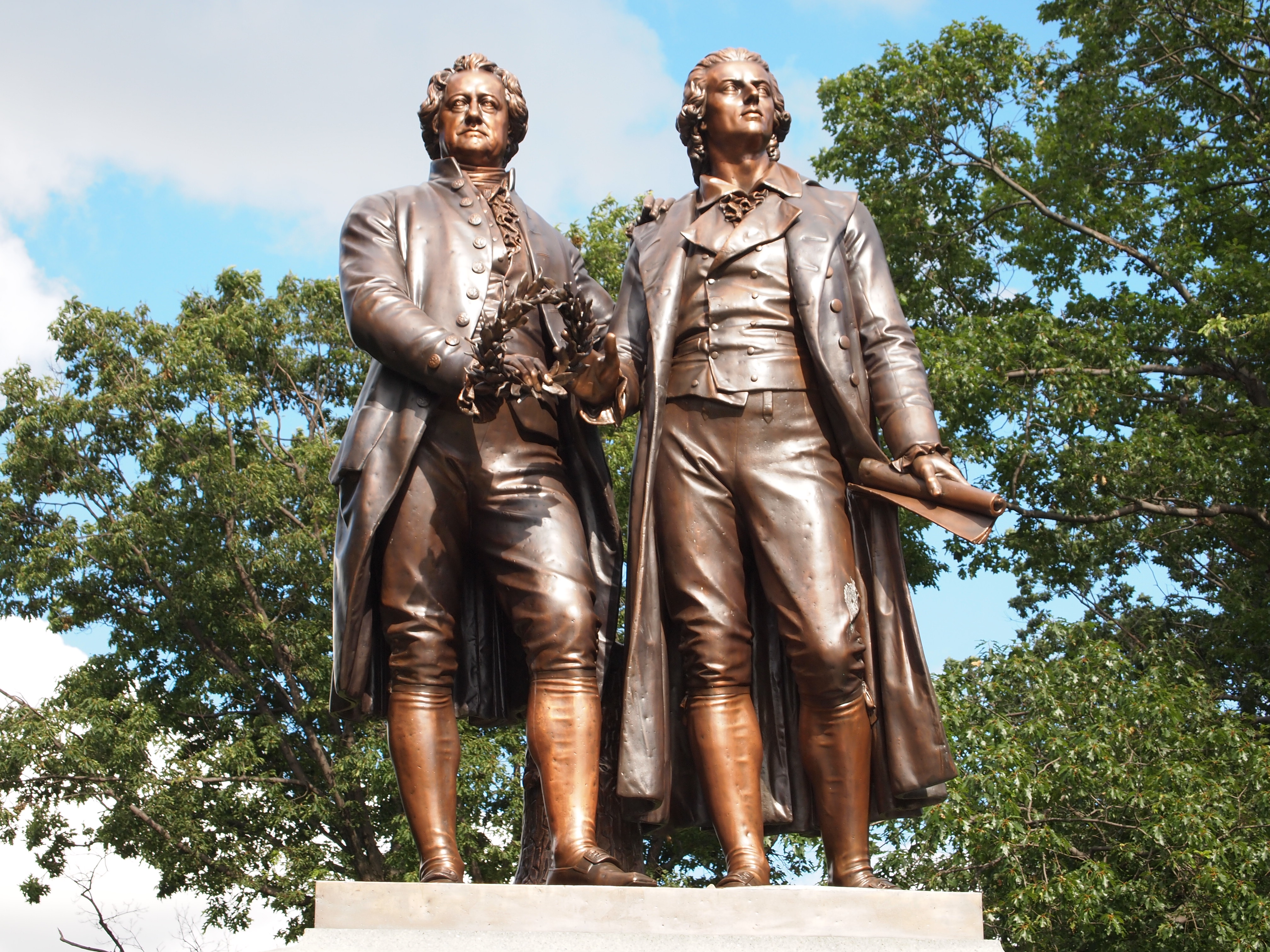
Copper electrotype (1911) of Ernst Rietschel's 1857 sculpture for the Goethe–Schiller Monument in Syracuse, New York USA. This sculpture is about 3.5 metres (11 ft) tall, and was produced by the WMF Company in Germany.

Electrotyping has been used for the production of metal sculptures, where it is an alternative to the casting of molten metal. These sculptures are sometimes called "galvanoplastic bronzes", although the actual metal is usually copper. It was possible to apply essentially any patina to these sculptures; gilding was also readily accomplished in the same facilities as electrotyping by using electroplating. Electrotyping has been used to reproduce valuable objects such as ancient coins, and in some cases electrotype copies have proven more durable than fragile originals.

One of the earliest documented large-scale (1.67 metres (5.5 ft)) electrotype sculptures was John Evan Thomas's Death of Tewdric Mawr, King of Gwent (1849). The electrotype was done by Elkington, Mason, & Co. for the Great Exhibition of 1851. Among the most spectacular early examples are Josef Hermann's twelve angels (1858) at the base of the cupola of Saint Isaac's Cathedral in St. Petersburg, Russia (see photograph A below). As described by Théophile Gautier in 1867, "They are twenty-one feet high, and were made by the galvanoplastic process in four pieces, whose welding together is invisible. They could in this manner be made so light that, in spite of their dimensions, they would not be too heavy for the cupola. This crown of gilt angels, poised amid a flood of light, and shining with rich reflections, produces an extremely rich effect." Other important sculptures followed; David A. Scott has written, "Some extremely important commissions were made in electrotypes, such as the "bronzes" that adorn the Opera, Paris, and the 320 cm high statue of Prince Albert and four accompanying figures, erected behind the Albert Hall in London as a memorial to the Great Exhibition of 1851." The statue of Prince Albert was unveiled in 1861 (see photograph B below); the electrotyping process "was one in which the Prince Consort had had great faith." The Palais Garnier in Paris (the Opera) has two 7.5-meter-tall (25 ft) sculptures above the main facade; the building was completed in 1869 (see photograph C below).

In the 19th century, museums often displayed electrotypes of ancient coins instead of the originals (see photograph D below), and individuals purchased electrotypes for their private collections. By 1920, the Victoria and Albert Museum in England had acquired nearly 1000 electrotyped copies of important objects from the collections of other European museums. The most celebrated may be their copy of the Jerningham wine cooler, which is a spectacular silverwork made in England in 1735 that has long been in the collection of the Hermitage Museum in Russia. Many of these objects were made by Elkington & Co., which had an extensive business in electrotyped silver.

An important example of electrotyping's use for preservation is the electrotype of the plaster life-mask of the poet John Keats (see photograph E below). The original life mask was made by Haydon in 1816. The plaster mask was electrotyped in 1884 by Elkington & Co., and this copper copy is now apparently in better condition than the plaster original.

From 1890 through at least 1930, the Abteilung für Galvanoplastic of the WMF Company in Germany produced many statues and other items using electrotyping. The statues in particular were significantly less expensive than bronze castings. Memorials in German cemeteries from this era often incorporated electroptyped statues from models that had been commissioned by WMF from well-known sculptors (see photograph F below). WMF also undertook larger commissions. One example is the full-sized copper electrotype (1911) of Ernst Rietschel's 1857 bronze for the Goethe–Schiller Monument in Weimar, Germany, which is about 3.5 metres (11 ft) tall (see photograph at right).

Many sculptors have experimented with the technique of electrotyping a plaster form that remains as the core of the finished sculpture (Kerngalvanoplastik). As one example, the sculptor Elie Nadelman did several significant sculptures in the 1920s and 1930s using this technique. The advantage was that Nadelman could have these "galvanoplastique" metal sculptures made quickly and inexpensively. Such sculptures can degrade quickly, and have presented significant preservation and restoration problems.

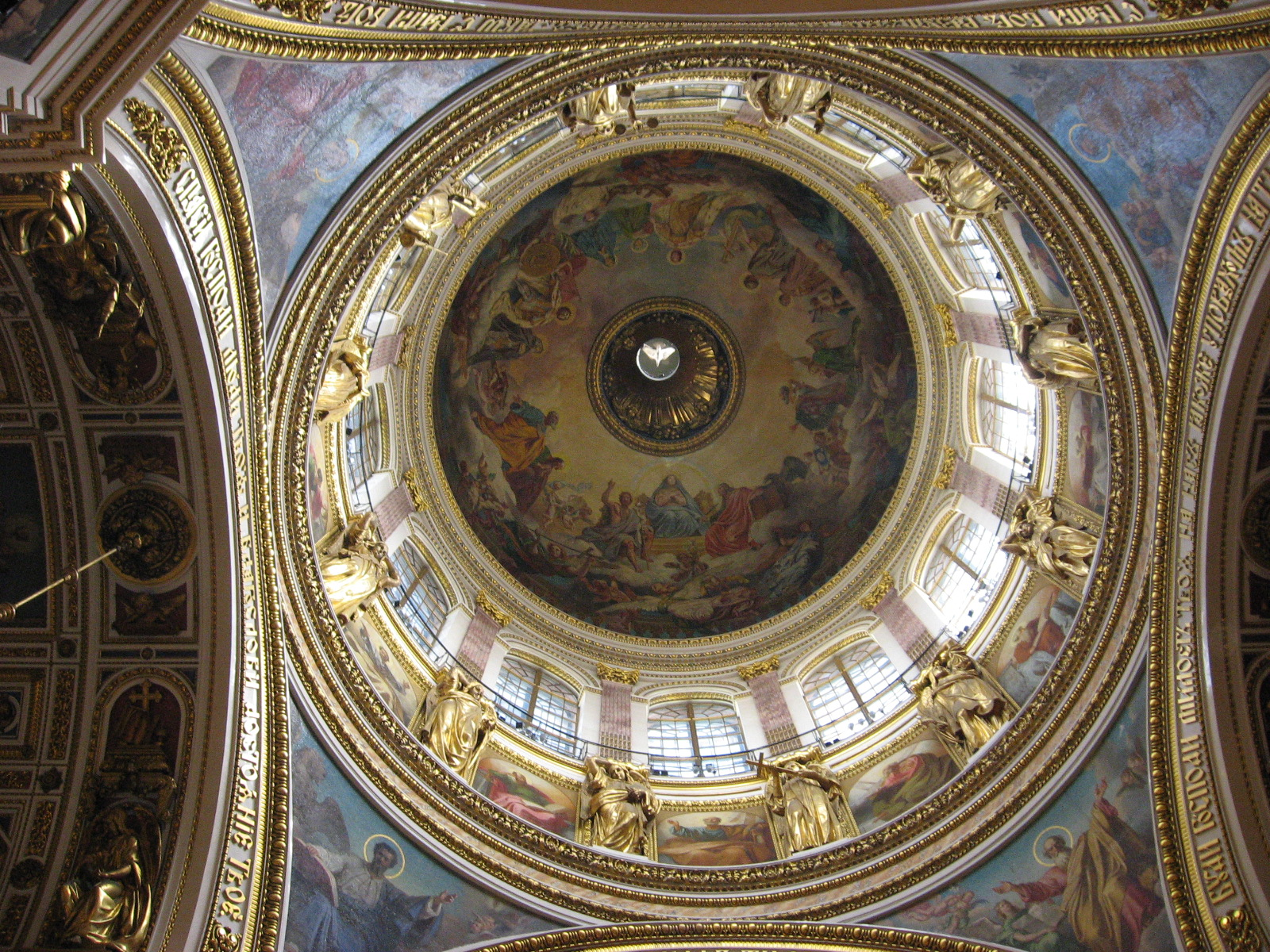
A. Among the earliest and most spectacular large sculptures produced by copper electrotyping were twelve gilt angels (ca. 1858) by Josef Hermann that stand in the cupola of Saint Isaac's Cathedral in St. Petersburg, Russia. These sculptures are 6 metres (20 ft) tall; the metal needed to be thin enough so that the weight of the sculptures could be supported high above the cathedral's floor.

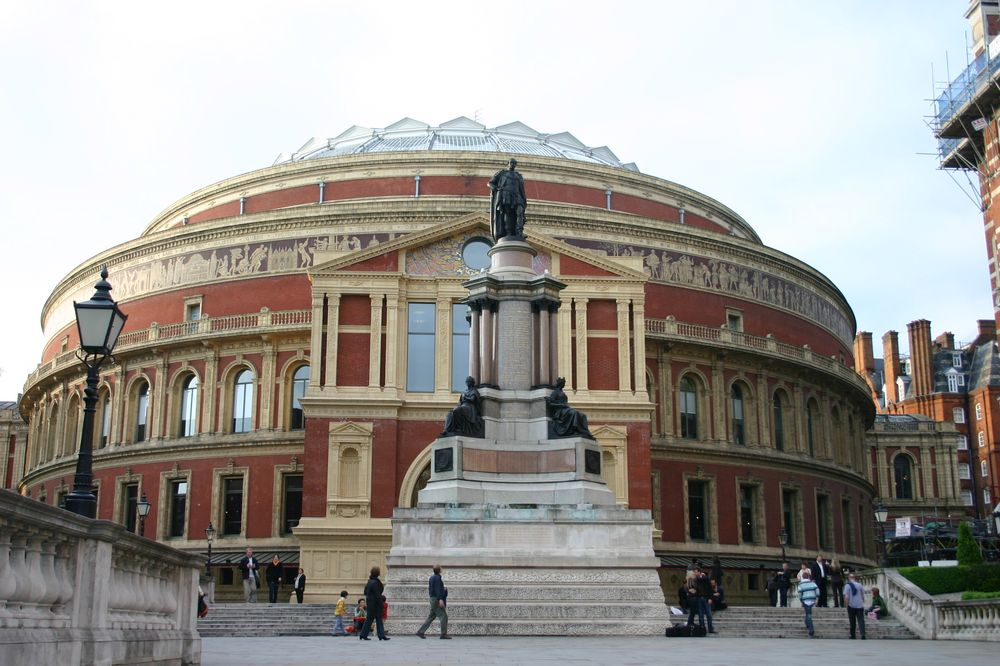
B. Memorial (1863) to The Great Exhibition of 1851 by Joseph Durham. The uppermost statue is of Prince Consort Albert; all five statues are electrotypes. The memorial stands before Royal Albert Hall in London, England.

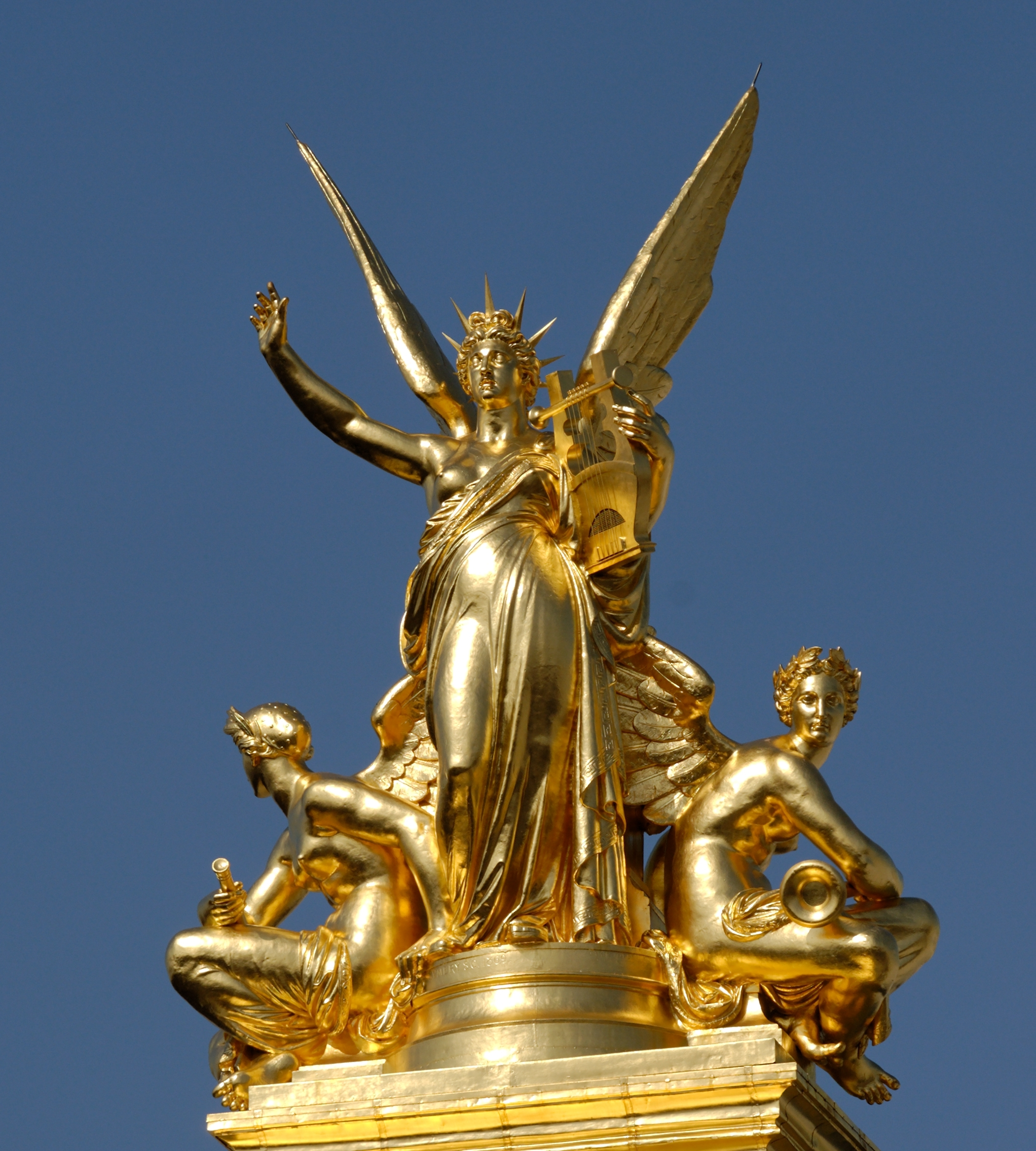
C. L'Harmonie (1869) by Charles Guméry is a 7.5-metre (25 ft) tall sculpture that crowns the Palais Garnier (the Opera) in Paris, France. The statue is a gilded copper electrotype, sometimes called a galvanoplastic bronze.

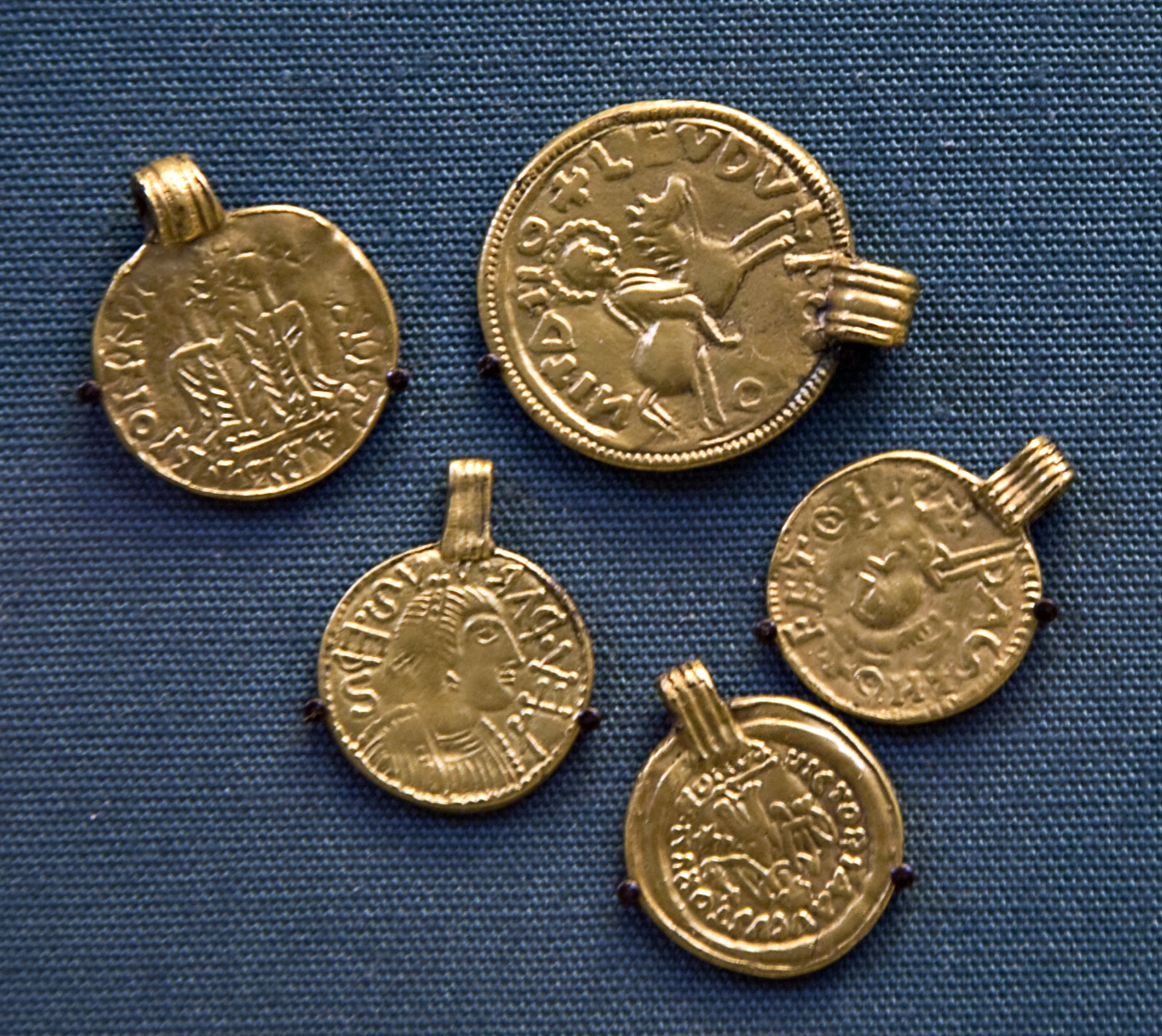
D. Electrotypes of 5th-century coins from the Canterbury-St Martin's hoard in England. Electrotype copies of coins and antiquities were produced for museum display and for private collectors.

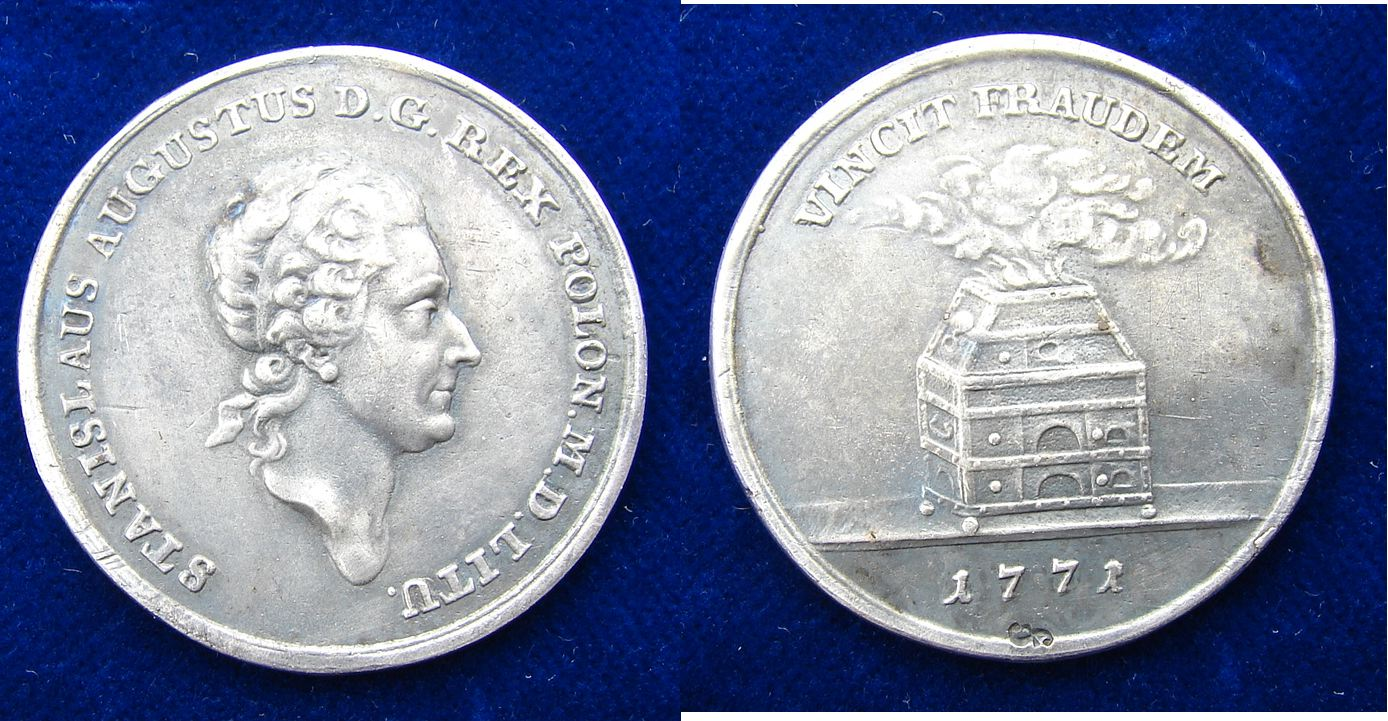
Stanislaus August on a Polish Half Taler, a very rare pattern coin of 1771. Electrotype.

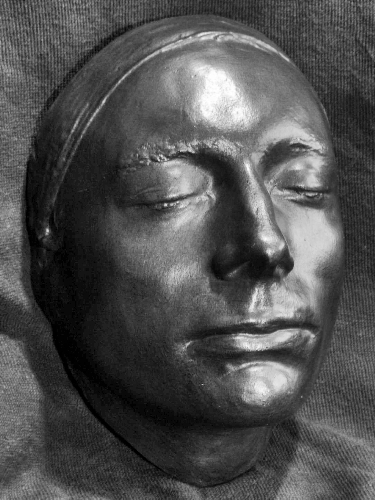
E. Reproduction of the electrotype of the poet John Keats' 1816 life-mask. The electrotype was made in 1884 by Elkington & Co. for the British National Portrait Gallery.

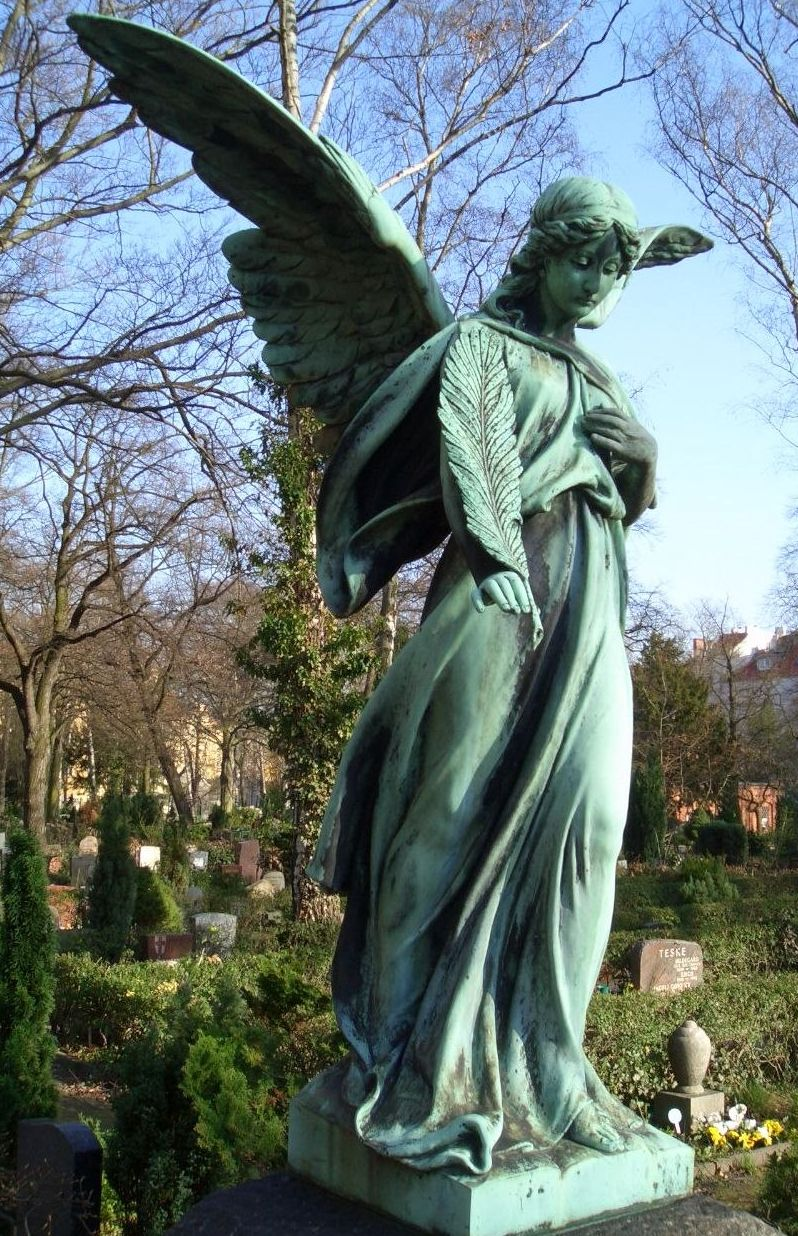
F. Copper electrotype (ca. 1903) of Raimund Liebhaber's sculpture of an angel. In the early 20th century, the Abteilung für Galvanoplastik (Galvanoplastic Division) of the WMF company produced many electrotype sculptures for German cemeteries.

== See also ==
- Luigi Galvani
- Electroforming
