= Goethe–Schiller Monument (San Francisco) =

Monument in Golden Gate Park, San Francisco, California, U.S.

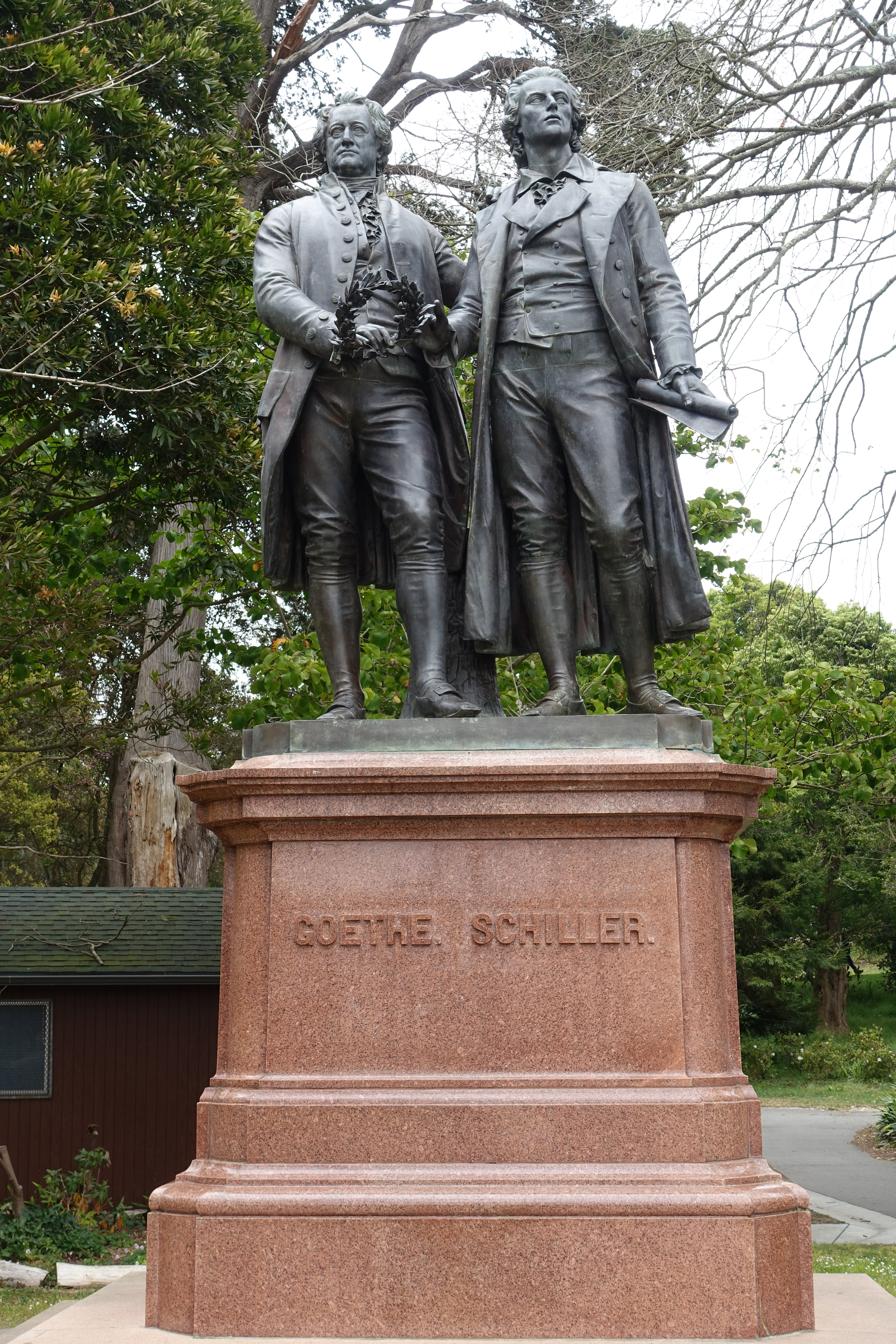
- The monument in 2015
- Location: San Francisco, California, U.S.; 37°46′16.4″N 122°27′57.4″W

A copy of the Goethe–Schiller Monument is installed in San Francisco's Golden Gate Park, in the U.S. state of California. The statue was dedicated on August 11, 1901.
