= Joseph Alexander Adams =

American engraver (1803-1880)

Joseph Alexander Adams (1803 – September 11, 1880) was an American engraver who is said to have been the first electrotyper in the United States. He was born in New Germantown, New Jersey (now within Tewksbury Township), in 1803.

He was an apprentice in the printing business. His work as an engraver had appeared as early as 1833 in the Treasury of Knowledge and the Cottage Bible. He engraved Last Arrow for the New York Mirror in 1837, and 1,600 illustrations for Harper's Illuminated Bible in 1843. He also made significant improvements in the process of electrotyping. He died in New Jersey in 1880.
