= Goethe Monument (Chicago) =

Statue in Chicago, Illinois, U.S.

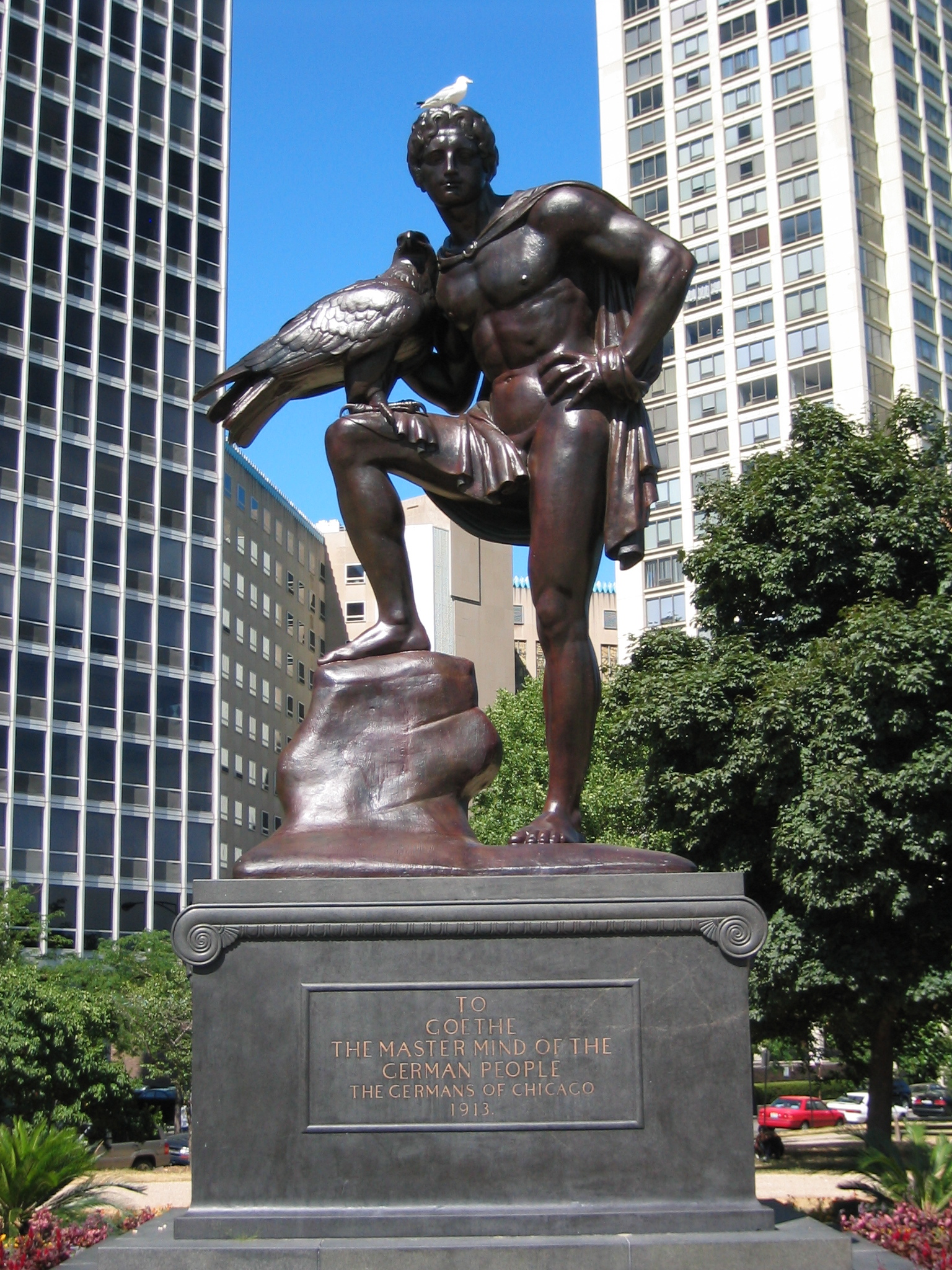
- The statue in 2005
- Completion date: 1913
- Dimensions: 550 cm (18 feet)
- Weight: 80 tons
- Location: Chicago, Illinois, U.S.
- Coordinates: 41°55′57.4″N 87°38′19″W

The Goethe Monument (or Johann Wolfgang von Goethe Monument) is a bronze statue by Hermann Hahn in Chicago's Lincoln Park, in the U.S. state of Illinois, unveiled in 1913. It depicts a larger-than-life, neoclassically-styled hero in undress with a draped cape, peering far into the distance, with a bent leg perched on a rock and a hunting eagle perched on his knee. The allegorical statue is not a portrait sculpture of the German philosopher Johann Wolfgang von Goethe, but rather seeks to embody the "spirit of Goethe"; a low wall behind the statue shows a bas-relief of Goethe and a quote from his play Faust in German and English. The inscription on the statue reads: "To / Goethe / The Master Mind of the / German People / The Germans of Chicago / 1913".
