= Goethe and Schiller Monument =

Monument at the German National Theater in Weimar (erected in 1857)

Goethe and Schiller
- Goethe und Schiller (German)
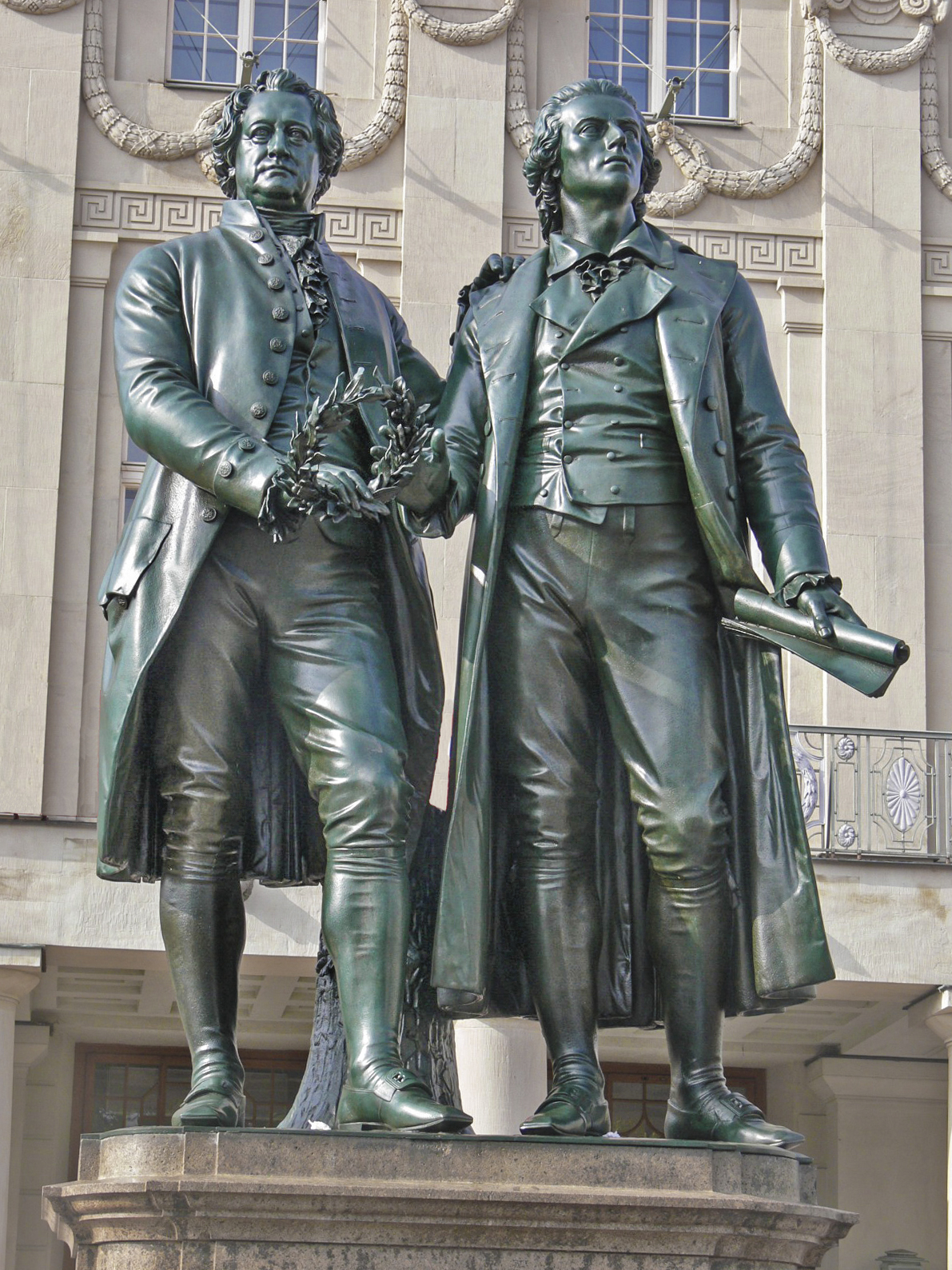
- Artist: Ernst Friedrich August Rietschel
- Year: 1857
- Type: bronze casting
- Dimensions: 3.7 m (12 ft)
- Location: Weimar (copies in San Francisco Cleveland, Milwaukee, Syracuse, & Anting); 50°58′48″N 11°19′34″E

The original Goethe and Schiller Monument (German: Goethe-Schiller-Denkmal) is in Weimar, Germany. It incorporates Ernst Rietschel's 1857 bronze double statue of Johann Wolfgang von Goethe (1749–1832) and Friedrich Schiller (1759–1805), who are probably the two most revered figures in German literature. The monument has been described "as one of the most famous and most beloved monuments in all of Germany" and as the beginning of a "cult of the monument". Dozens of monuments to Goethe and to Schiller were built subsequently in Europe and the United States.

Goethe and Schiller had a remarkable friendship and collaboration that was "like no other known to literature or art." Both men had lived in Weimar, and were the seminal figures of a literary movement known as Weimar Classicism. The bronze figures of the Goethe–Schiller statue are substantially larger than life-size; notably, both are given the same height, even though Goethe was nearly 20 cm shorter than Schiller.

The figures were mounted on a large stone pedestal in front of the Court Theater that Goethe had directed, and that had seen premieres and countless performances of Schiller's plays. Goethe is on the left in the photograph, his left hand resting lightly on Schiller's shoulder. Goethe grasps a laurel wreath in his right hand, and Schiller's right hand is stretched out toward the wreath. Goethe wears the formal court dress of the era; Schiller is in ordinary dress.

Four exact copies of Rietschel's statue were subsequently commissioned by German-Americans in the United States for the Goethe–Schiller monuments in San Francisco (1901), Cleveland (1907), Milwaukee (1908), and Syracuse (1911). 65,000 people attended the dedication of the Cleveland monument. A fifth copy of reduced size was installed in Anting, China, in 2006; Anting New Town is a "German-themed" town near Shanghai that was developed around 2000.

== The Weimar monument ==
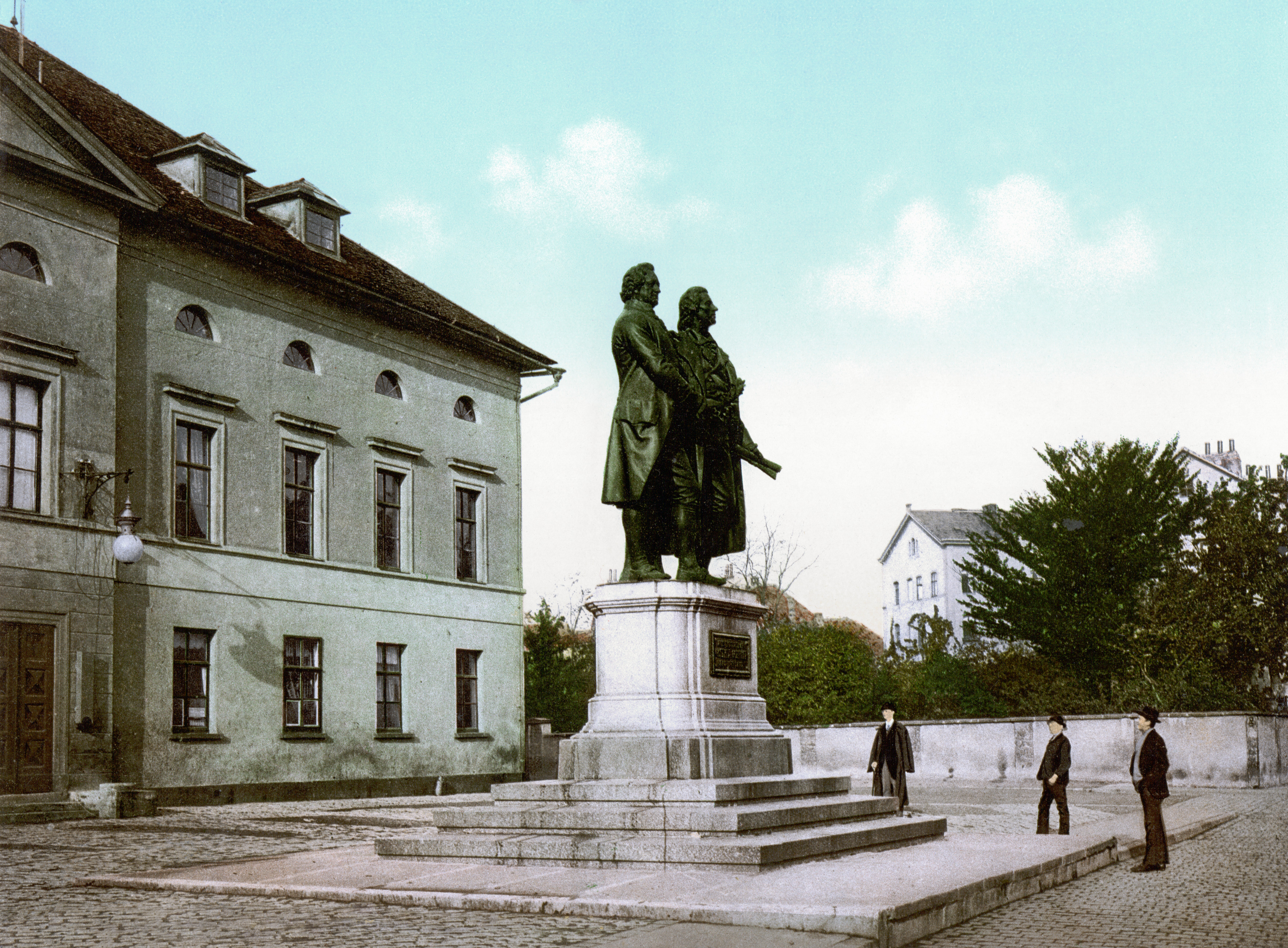
1900 photograph of the Goethe–Schiller monument in front of the Court Theater in Weimar

The project of creating a Goethe–Schiller monument in Weimar was sponsored by Karl Alexander August Johann, the Grand Duke of the Saxe-Weimar-Eisenach Duchy, and by a citizen's commission. The dedication of the monument was planned to coincide with the centennial celebrations of the birth of the earlier Grand Duke Karl August, who had brought Goethe to Weimar in 1775. Goethe lived most of his adult life there, and Schiller the last six years of his life. The site for the monument was the city square that fronted the Court Theater (German: das Hoftheater) where Goethe was managing director from 1791 to 1815; Goethe later wrote that he had "tried to elevate the masses intellectually with Shakespeare, Gozzi, and Schiller". Goethe arranged for the theater to premiere Schiller's last four plays (Mary Stuart, The Bride of Messina, The Maid of Orleans, and William Tell). By the time of their monument's dedication in 1857, the theater had seen countless performances of all Schiller's plays.

Christian Daniel Rauch was invited to prepare a design for a double statue (German: Doppelstandbild); Rauch was perhaps the most prominent sculptor working in German-speaking Europe in the first half of the 19th century. Rauch's design has the two men clad in antique dress; while the convention of creating sculptures of heroic figures in antique dress was well established, it was rejected in this case. Ernst Rietschel, another prominent sculptor who had been Rauch's student, made a design with the two men in contemporary dress that was accepted, and a contract was signed with Rietschel in December 1852.

Rietschel needed four years to complete the full-size model for the statue. The actual casting in bronze was done remarkably quickly by Ferdinand von Miller at the Royal Foundry in Munich. The finished monument was dedicated on 4 September 1857, as part of the celebrations for the centenary of the birth of Grand Duke Karl August. Hans Pohlsander has written, "The monument was the first double statue on German soil, and was widely, and rightly, proclaimed a masterpiece."

== The U.S. monuments ==
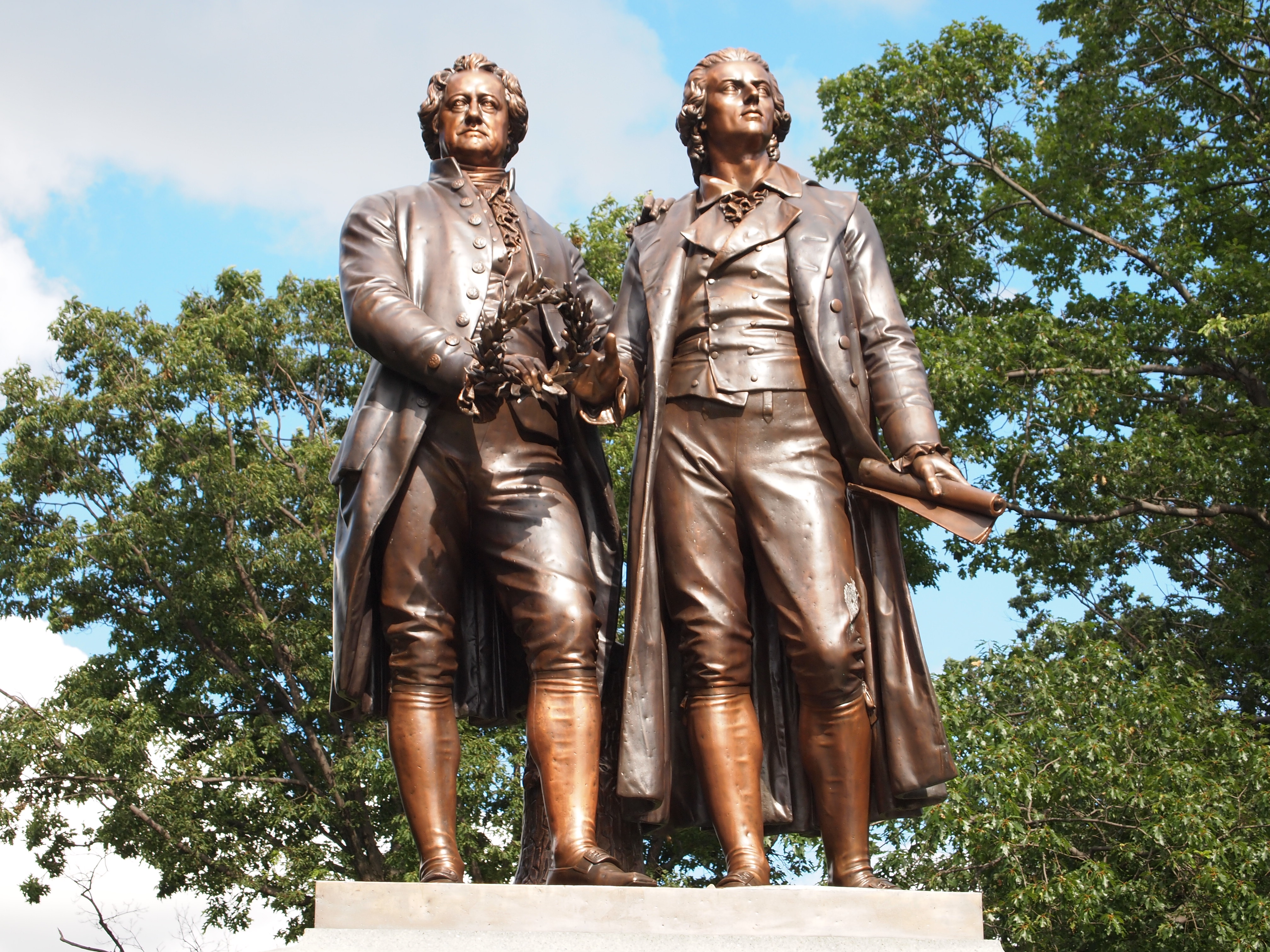
2010 photograph of the electrotyped copper statue in Syracuse, New York. While the 1857 Weimar monument is in a city square, the four US monuments are in parks.

In 1895 in San Francisco, California, the Goethe–Schiller Denkmal Gesellschaft (Goethe–Schiller Monument Company) was formed for the purpose of raising a version of the Weimar Monument in Golden Gate Park. Instead of the Munich foundry used to cast the original statue, the foundry in Lauchhammer was contracted to make a new bronze casting. The molds were prepared from Rietschel's original forms at the Albertinum in Dresden; the work was supervised by Rudolf Siemering, a Berlin sculptor. The statue was installed on a granite pedestal and steps that closely copied those of the Weimar original. The monument was dedicated on 11 August 1901, with 30,000 people in attendance according to the souvenir book published shortly thereafter. The festivities continued throughout the day and evening.

Three additional monuments based on Rietschel's bronze were raised over the next decade. The Cleveland, Ohio monument in Wade Park was dedicated on 9 June 1907. Wilhelm II, the German Emperor, sent a congratulatory cable, to which the head of the Goethe–Schiller Memorial Committee responded, "Emperor Wilhelm, Berlin. Goethe–Schiller Memorial unveiled in presence of 65,000 persons. In this sacred hour American citizens of Cleveland of German origin respectfully thank Your Majesty for his good wishes." The Milwaukee, Wisconsin monument in Washington Park was dedicated on 12 June 1908 before 35,000 people. The bronze statues for the Cleveland and Milwaukee monuments had also been cast by the Lauchhammer foundry. The statue for the Syracuse monument is electrotyped copper, and not a bronze casting. It was sited in Schiller Park, which had been renamed in 1905 to honor the centennial of Schiller's death. The monument was dedicated on 15 October 1911.

All of the American monuments were sited in city parks, whereas the Weimar monument is in a city square. As can be seen from the antique postcards, the stonework of the San Francisco, Cleveland, and Syracuse monuments is similar to the Weimar original. The Syracuse monument is on a steep slope, and is distinguished by a formal stone stairway approaching the statue. The Milwaukee monument's stonework is more extensive. The three steps underneath the pedestal in Weimar were widened greatly in the Milwaukee design, and support long stone walls and benches on both flanks of the pedestal and sculpture; access to the back of the monument rear is reduced correspondingly.

== 19th-century contexts ==
Postcards of the monuments

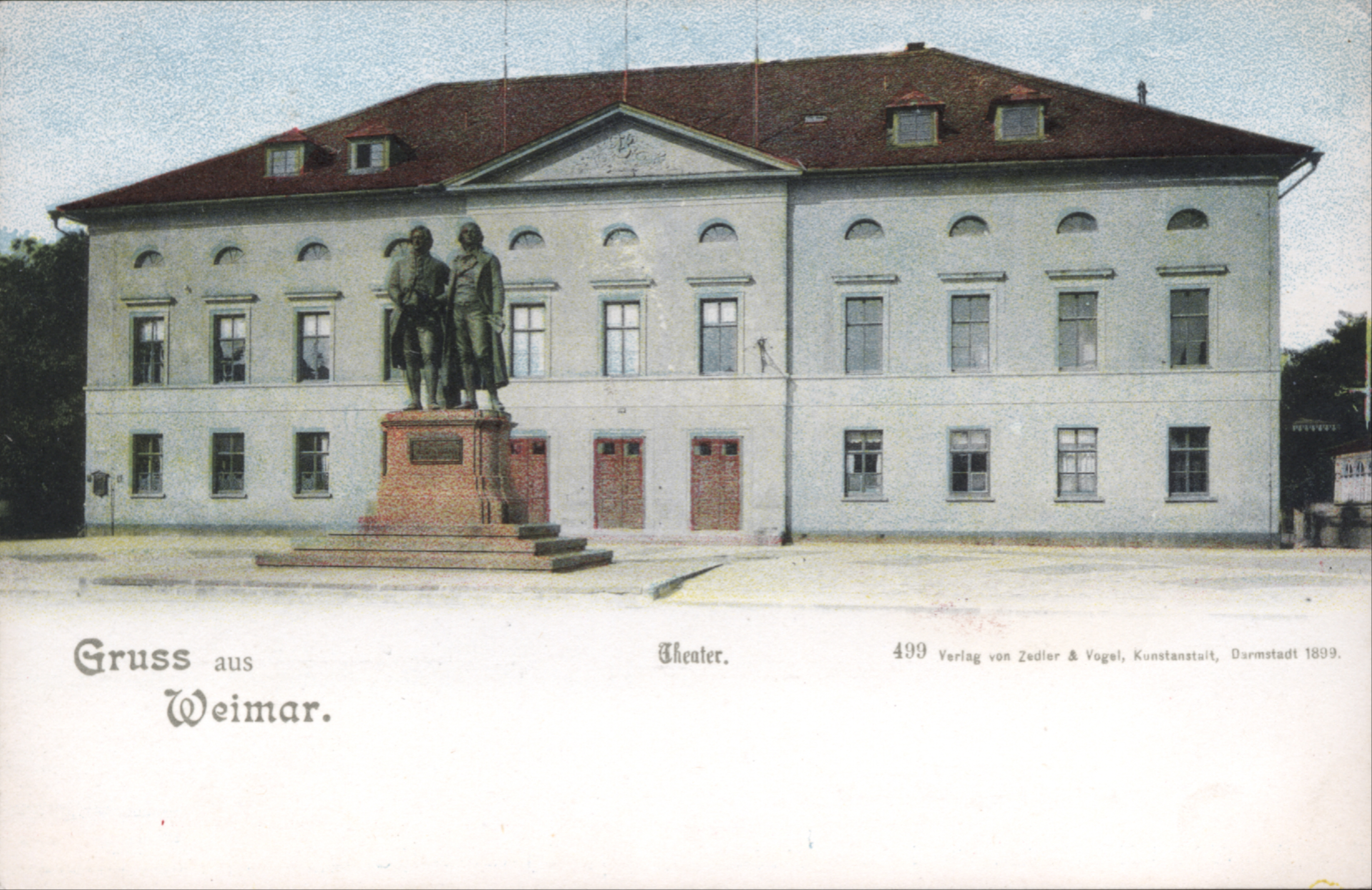
Weimar, Germany (1857)

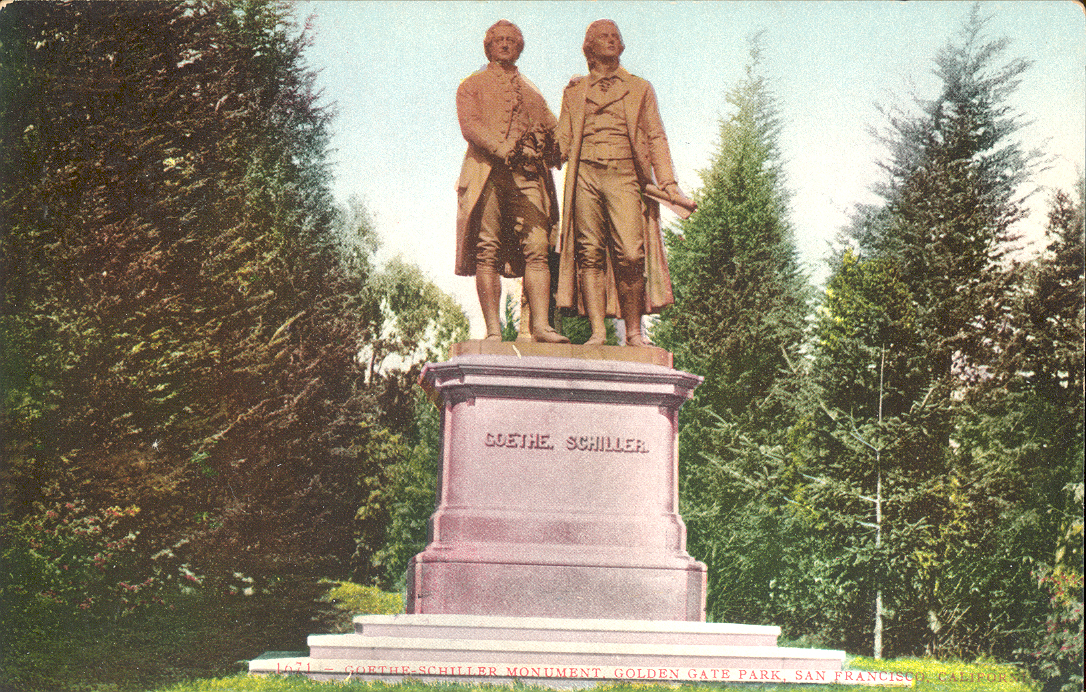
San Francisco, California (1901)

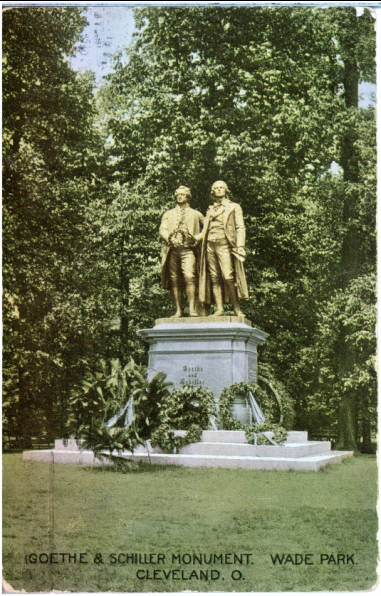
Cleveland, Ohio (1907)

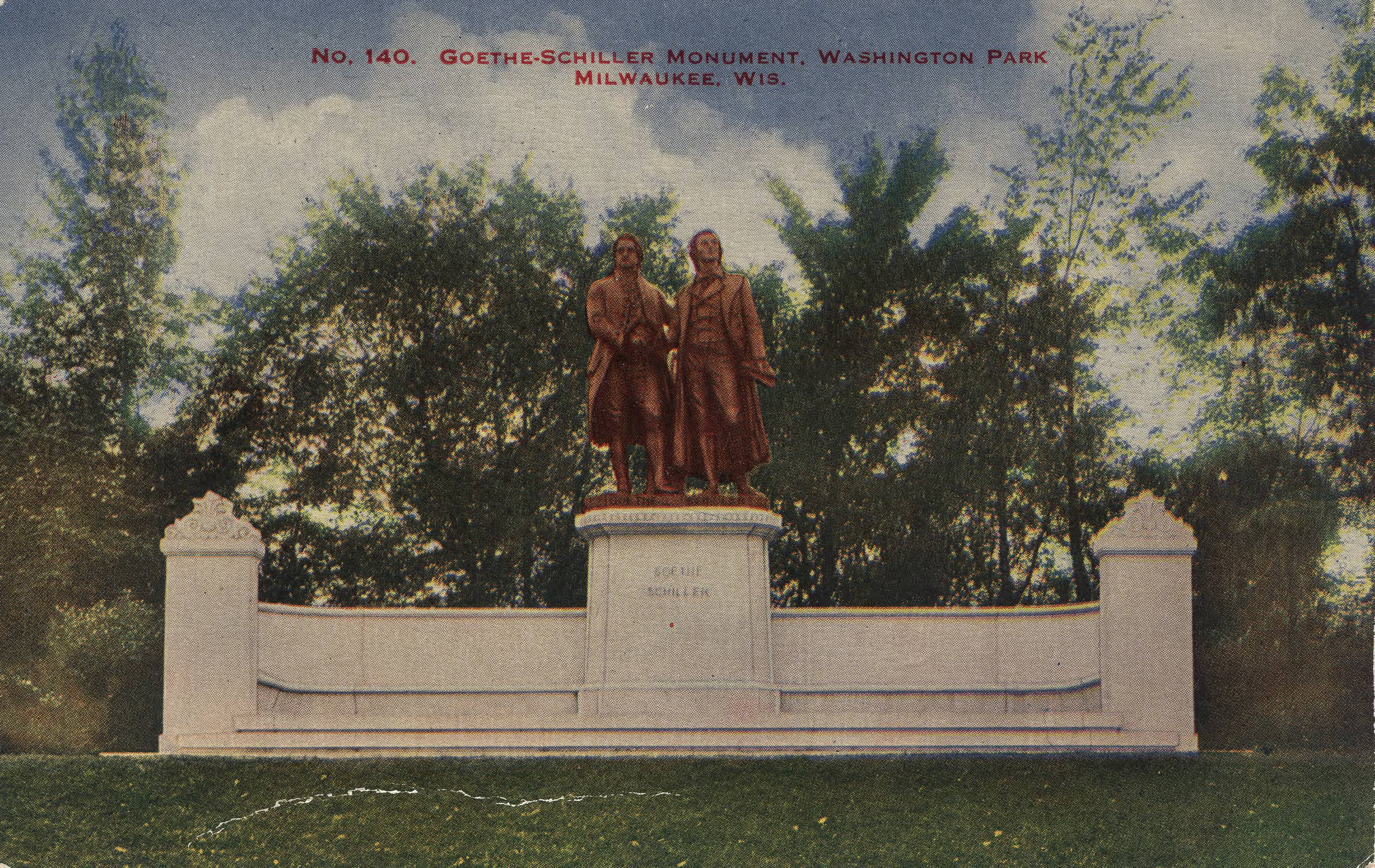
Milwaukee, Wisconsin (1908)

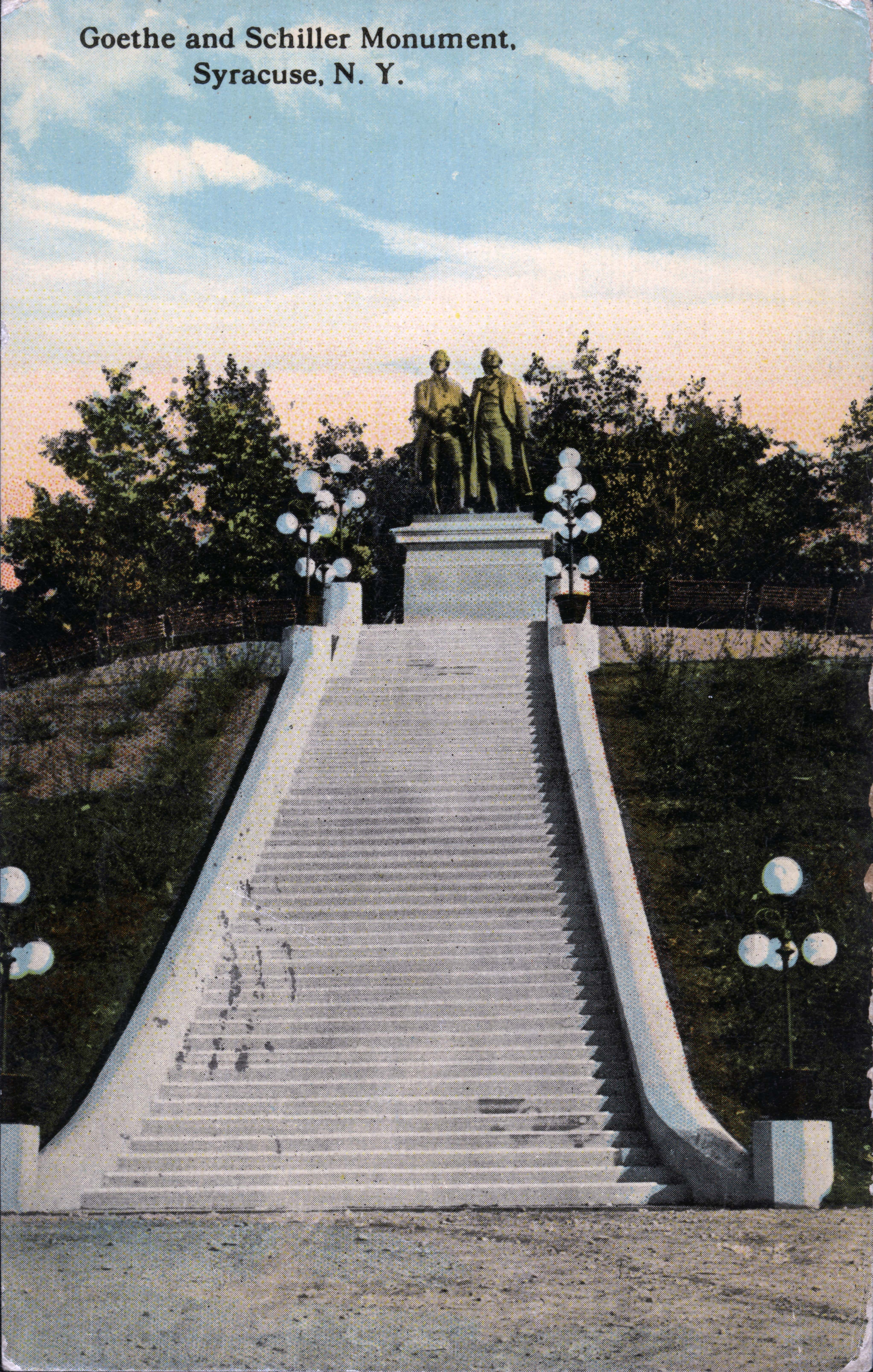
Syracuse, New York (1911)

=== German lands in Europe ===
The commissioning of Rietschel's Goethe–Schiller statue had one clear motivation: to honor Weimar's famous poets and their patron; indeed, Schiller and Goethe had been entombed, along with Grand Duke Karl August, in the ducal burial chapel (the Fürstengruft) in Weimar. A second motivation may have been to increase "culture tourism" to the city, which had a claim as the "Athens on the Ilm". The statue was nonetheless part of a wider, essentially popular movement in mid-19th-century Germany. Ute Frevert has summarized the program of speakers at its dedication: "Unlike the Grand Duke, who wanted to harness the ceremony to the cart of dynastic legitimation, the bourgeois speakers transformed it into a national celebration at which the 'German people' paid homage to its 'heroes'". In the mid-19th century, the German-speaking population in Europe was divided between many, mostly small countries. Paul Zanker has written of this movement:

After the wars of liberation in German lands had brought neither political freedom nor national unity, the citizenry began to seek in cultural pursuits a substitute for what they still lacked. For example, they erected monuments to intellectual giants, usually at the most conspicuous place in the city, an honor that until then had been reserved for princes and military men. ... There arose a true cult of the monument, which included broadsheets, picture books, and luxury editions of "collected works". With all this activity, the Germans began to see themselves, faute de mieux, as "the people of poets and thinkers." This is especially true of the period of the restoration, and in particular, the years after the failed revolution of 1848, when monuments to famous Germans, above all Friedrich von Schiller, sprouted everywhere.

By 1859, the centenary of Schiller's birth and the occasion for 440 celebrations in German lands, Schiller had emerged as the "poet of freedom and unity" for German citizens. Ute Frevert writes, "It did not matter who spoke, a Hamburg plumber, a political emigrant in Paris, an aristocratic civil servant in Münster, a writer in Wollenbüttel, they unanimously invoked Schiller as a singer of freedom and the prophet of German unity." Rüdiger Görner illustrates the origins of this reputation with a speech from the "famous" tenth scene of the third act of Schiller's 1787 play, Don Carlos: "Look all around at nature's mastery, / Founded on freedom. And how rich it grows, / Feeding on freedom."

Wolf Lepenies takes a similar perspective, writing that "After the revolution of 1848 failed, Schiller became more popular, as the festivities for his hundredth birthday in 1859 demonstrated; the occasion was celebrated throughout the German lands in a mood of patriotic fervor. Two years earlier, the Goethe–Schiller monument had been erected in Weimar, but only after the Prussian victory over France in the war of 1870—1871 did it become a national place of worship."

=== German-America ===
Between 1830 and 1900, about 4 million immigrants came to the United States from German countries in Europe; this amounted to about a 7% emigration from German countries and a 7% immigration into the United States. In the United States, German immigrants often settled in fairly unpopulated areas near the Great Lakes, and the percentage of German immigrants and their children reached 40% in some regions. As one example, in 1885 about 17% of Wisconsin's population of some 1.6 million people had been born in Germany. With their children, an estimate was that 31% of the state's population was either German-born, or the children of two German-born parents. Wisconsin's major city, Milwaukee, had been dubbed "the German Athens in America".

Many of these German-American communities worked assiduously to preserve German language and culture, and Schiller "was the best expression of that side of German character which most qualified the German despite his distinctiveness to become a true American citizen". Phyllida Lloyd, a recent director of Schiller's plays, has said "During the Civil War, and this was complete news to me, a quarter of a million German-born soldiers were fighting for Lincoln. Many of them were carrying Schiller in their knapsacks."

By the late 19th century, German-Americans were participating in the monument-building movement of German-speaking Europe. At the 1901 dedication of the first US Goethe–Schiller monument, C. M. Richter remarked:

The German, who brought these two masters as his inheritance to a new homeland, contributed this wealth to the intellectual life of his fellow citizens. Never has a genius demonstrated the worth of virtue, the triumph of freedom, and the noble heart of patriotism with more eloquence and ardor than Schiller. This spiritual treasure of Germans is the most beautiful and precious dowry with which he could bind himself to his adoptive fatherland, and it was well-done to put it into service with a monument.

Richter's speech and many others at the dedication were actually delivered in German.

By 1901, monuments to Schiller had already been erected in New York City (1859), Philadelphia (1886), Chicago (1886), Columbus (1891), and St. Louis (1898). The Chicago and St. Louis monuments were recastings of Ernst Rau's 1876 bronze located in Marbach, Germany, where Schiller was born in 1759. A monument to Goethe had also been erected in Philadelphia (1891–Heinrich Manger). By 1914 and the outbreak of World War I, eight additional monuments to Schiller had been erected in the US. Four were the double monuments to Goethe and to Schiller. Four monuments to Schiller alone were raised (in Omaha (1905), St. Paul (1907), Rochester (1907), and Detroit (1908)). An additional monument to Goethe had been built in Chicago (1914). This monument, by Hermann Hahn, shows an idealized figure often identified with Zeus; it signaled a profound departure from sculptures that were recognizable portraits of the poets. Overall, the monument-building enthusiasm in German-America had been at least as great as in German-speaking Europe. Thirteen monuments to Schiller had been erected in the US, and 24 were erected by the much larger German-speaking population in Europe.
