= Goethe–Schiller Monument (Syracuse) =

Last of four Goethe & Schiller monument replicas erected in US cities

Goethe and Schiller
- Goethe und Schiller (German)
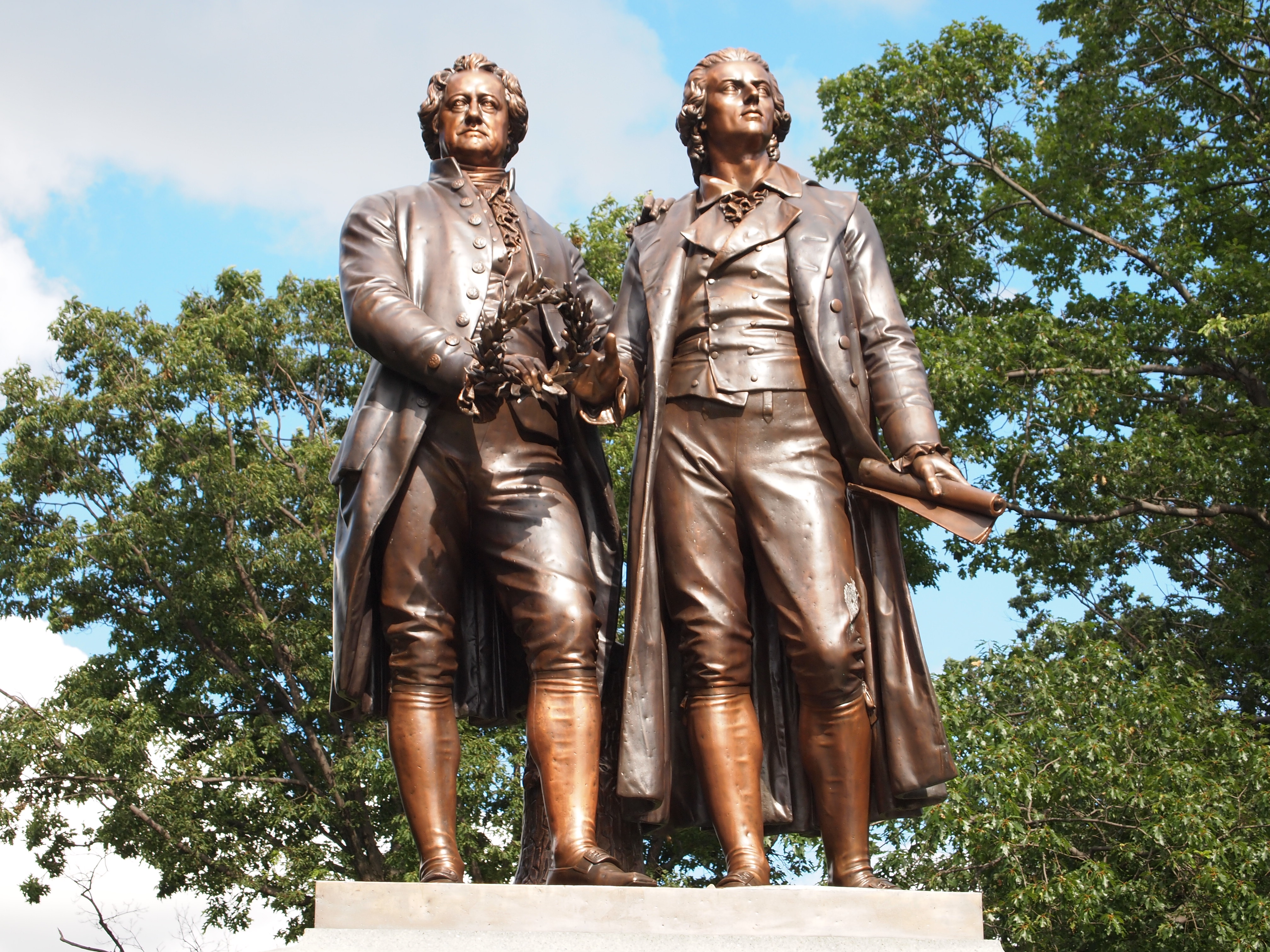
- Artist: Ernst Rietschel
- Year: 1911
- Type: copper electrotyping (from original 1857 bronze in Weimar)
- Location: Syracuse; 43°4′10.5″N 76°8′30″W

The Goethe–Schiller Monument in Syracuse, New York incorporates a copper double-statue of the German poets Johann Wolfgang von Goethe (1749–1832) and Friedrich Schiller (1759–1805). It was erected by the German-American organizations of Syracuse and Onondaga County, and was unveiled on October 15, 1911. Schiller, who is on the reader's right in the photograph, was called the "poet of freedom" in the US, and he had an enormous 19th Century following. The Syracuse monument was the last of 13 monuments to Schiller that were erected in US cities. He and Schiller are paired in the statue because of their strong friendship. As Paul Zanker writes, in the statue a "fatherly Goethe gently lays his hand on the shoulder of the restless Schiller, as if to quiet the overzealous passion for freedom of the younger generation." Goethe is holding a laurel wreath in his right hand, and Schiller's right hand is reaching towards it.

The Goethe–Schiller Monument in Syracuse was modeled on the 1857 monument in Weimar, Germany. Ernst Rietschel had been commissioned to create a cast bronze double-statue for Weimar, which was exactly copied for the Syracuse and for three earlier US monuments. The Syracuse monument is in Schiller Park, which had been renamed in 1905, the centennial of Schiller's death. The statue tops a large black marble pedestal; it is at the top of a steep slope, and is approached by a formal stairway (see postcard and photo).

The US monuments were costly and took years of fundraising and effort to erect. Their dedications drew large crowds. The 1907 dedication of the Goethe–Schiller monument in Cleveland, Ohio drew 65,000 attendees. For the dedication in Syracuse, The Syracuse Herald reported that:

Impressive ceremonies marked the unveiling of the Schiller–Goethe monument in Schiller park yesterday afternoon. Thousands of German citizens of Syracuse and thousands of others who appreciate the gift German residents have made to the city were present when Miss Lulu E. Dopffel pulled the cord that released the flags and exposed the beautiful memorial to view.

It was a scene long to be remembered. The plateau of Schiller park, rising high above its surroundings and topped with the bronze figures of the German poets, was thronged with men and women and children. Hundreds were there who had never visited Schiller park. Scores of banners of the marching societies, American flags and brilliant uniforms added to the beauty of the scene.

== 19th century context ==
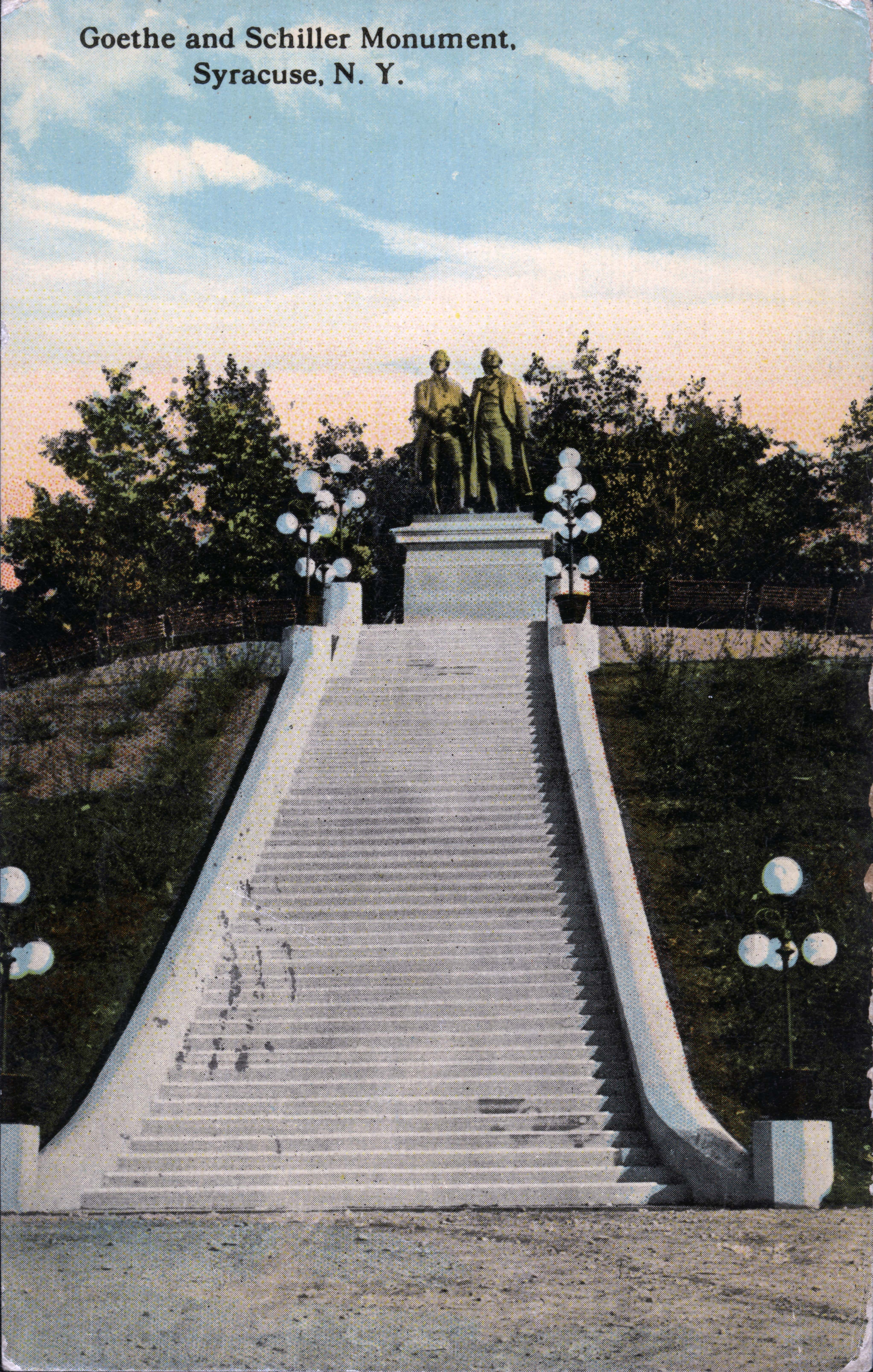
1913 postcard of the Goethe–Schiller Monument in Syracuse

As Paul Zanker describes it, the original Weimar monument helped launch a "veritable cult" of zeal for the poets and of monument building. The monument was very unusual for its time. It was rare until the 1850s to erect costly monuments to poets and intellectuals. Double monuments were also unusual, as was the choice to depict the poets in contemporary dress. The resulting monument was considered highly successful, and set a style for the numerous monuments to the poets that followed. By 1859, the centenary of Schiller's birth and the occasion for 440 celebrations in German lands, Schiller in particular had emerged as the "poet of freedom and unity" for German citizens. Rüdiger Görner has illustrated the origins of Schiller's reputation with a speech from the "famous" tenth scene of the third act of Schiller's 1787 play, Don Carlos: "Look all around at nature's mastery, / Founded on freedom. And how rich it grows, / Feeding on freedom." Ute Frevert has written of the celebrations, "It did not matter who spoke, a Hamburg plumber, a political emigrant in Paris, an aristocratic civil servant in Münster, a writer in Wollenbüttel, they unanimously invoked Schiller as a singer of freedom and the prophet of German unity."

About four dozen monuments to Schiller or Goethe were erected in German-speaking Europe between 1850 and the outbreak of World War I in 1914. In the same era, four million German-speakers emigrated to the United States. Schiller continued to have great significance to these immigrants; his work "was the best expression of that side of German character which most qualified the German despite his distinctiveness to become a true American citizen". By the late 1800s, the German-Americans had also become prodigious monument builders, and they erected at least fifteen additional monuments to the poets prior to World War I.

In 1900, the total population of Syracuse and Onondaga County was 168,000. Nearly 10,000 had been born in German-speaking countries of Europe; with their children, it was estimated at the time that there were more than 25,000 German-speakers. There were extensive observances in May, 1905 of the centennial of Schiller's death. Round Top Park was renamed Schiller Park on July 3, 1905, and planning commenced for the Goethe–Schiller Monument.

The monument they erected was costly. In Syracuse, the 1908 Deutscher Tag (German Day) celebration was raising funds for the monument, as did the subsequent 1909 and 1910 German Days. The 1908 Goethe–Schiller Monument in Milwaukee cost $15,000 to erect, and presumably the cost for the Syracuse monument three years later was about the same. For comparison, the cost of building the sizable 1901 Deutsche Evangelische Friedenskirche (German Evangelist Peace Church) in Syracuse was also about $15,000.

Ultimately, about 60 monuments to Schiller and to Goethe were built in German-speaking Europe and the United States. The 1911 Syracuse monument was one of the last in the style that had been largely established by the Weimar original 54 years earlier. Christiane Hertel has suggested that the lavishness of the late monuments and their celebrations in the US were "a German-American farewell to the Schiller cult, at least in this form and with this popular, inclusive scope." While the Weimar monument is still "one of the most famous and most beloved monuments in all of Germany", the original significance of the US monuments is now largely forgotten.

== Fabrication and restoration of the monument ==
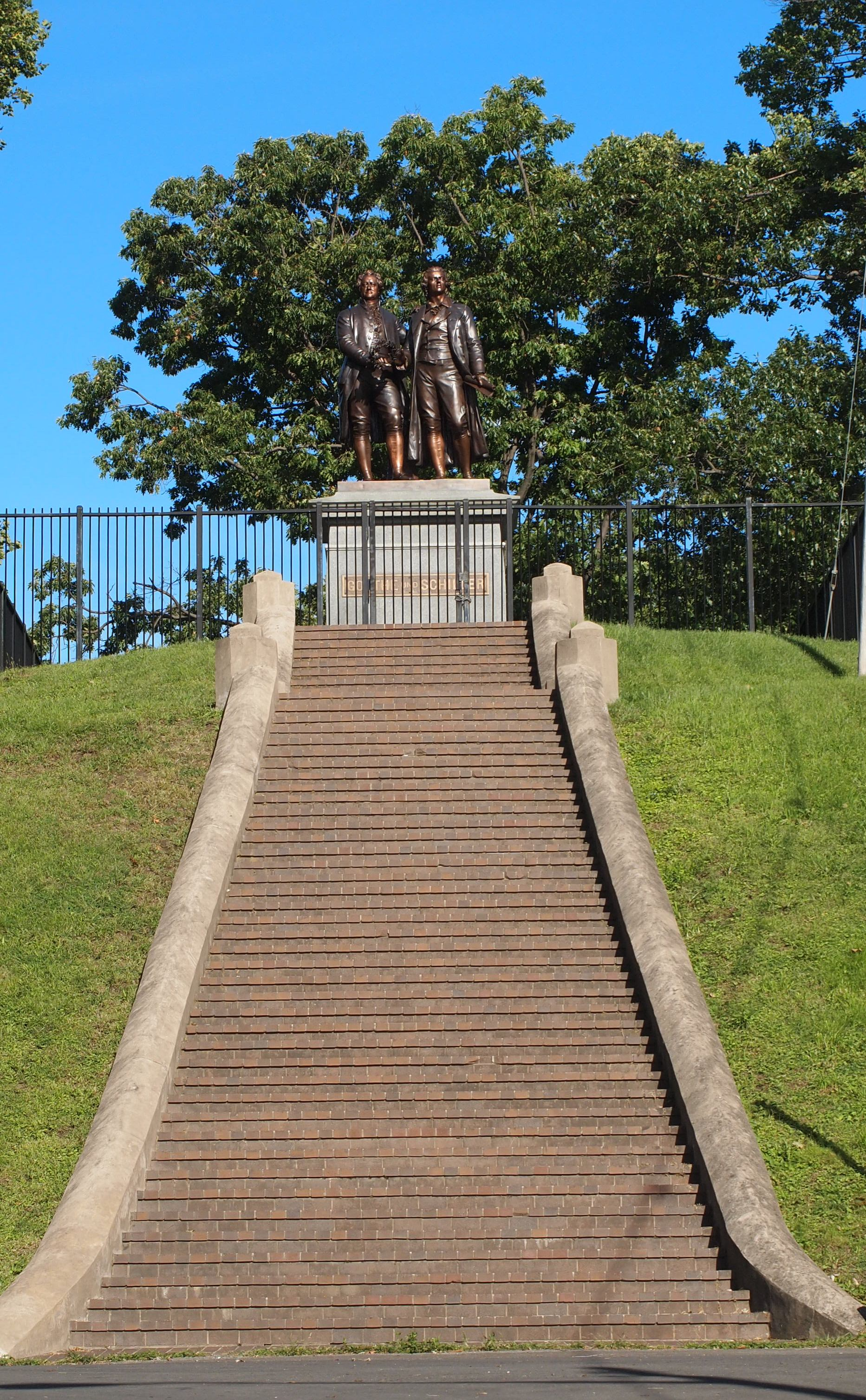
August 2010 photograph of the approach to the Goethe–Schiller Monument in Syracuse. The electrical lighting fixtures that were installed in 1911 have been removed.

The first three Goethe–Schiller monuments in the US were in San Francisco (1901), Cleveland (1907), and Milwaukee (1908). They all incorporated bronze sculptures cast at the foundry in Lauchhammer, Germany; the original sculpture in Weimar is also a bronze casting. The statue in Syracuse is not a casting; it consists of thin copper pieces that are joined together. The statue has a small plaque attached to its base that reads "Galvanoplastik-Geislingen St.", which indicates that it was made by the Abteilung für Galvanoplastik (Galvanoplastic Division) of the WMF Company in Geislingen an der Steige, Germany. Galvanoplastik is a German word encompassing both electrotyping and electroforming. The pieces were fabricated using the electrotyping process, which involves the depositing of copper metal from a solution of chemicals onto the inside of a mold. The process is activated by electrical currents flowing between wires immersed in the solution and a coating on the mold; the coating and the solution both conduct electricity. As in the Syracuse statue, large electrotyped sculptures typically consist of electrotyped copper pieces that are joined together, most likely by soldering. The individual pieces in electrotyped sculptures are a fraction of an inch thick, and one surface conforms very exactly to the details of the mold. The Syracuse sculpture is apparently the only copy of Rietschel's statue that was produced using copper electrotyping, and may be the only public artwork in the United States that was produced by WMF.

As can be seen by comparing the 1913 postcard and the contemporary photograph, at some point the decorative electrical lighting fixtures on the staircase leading to the monument were removed. By 2001 the condition of the monument had become very poor due both to weathering and to vandalism. The German-American Society of Central New York undertook a project to restore the monument, in cooperation with the city government of Syracuse. In 2003, the statue was restored by Sharon BuMann, who described the construction of the statue in an interview the same year. At the same time the masonry pedestal for the statue was cleaned, the stairway leading to the statue was repaired, and decorative iron fencing was installed around the statue and pedestal.
