= Hermann Hahn =

German sculptor

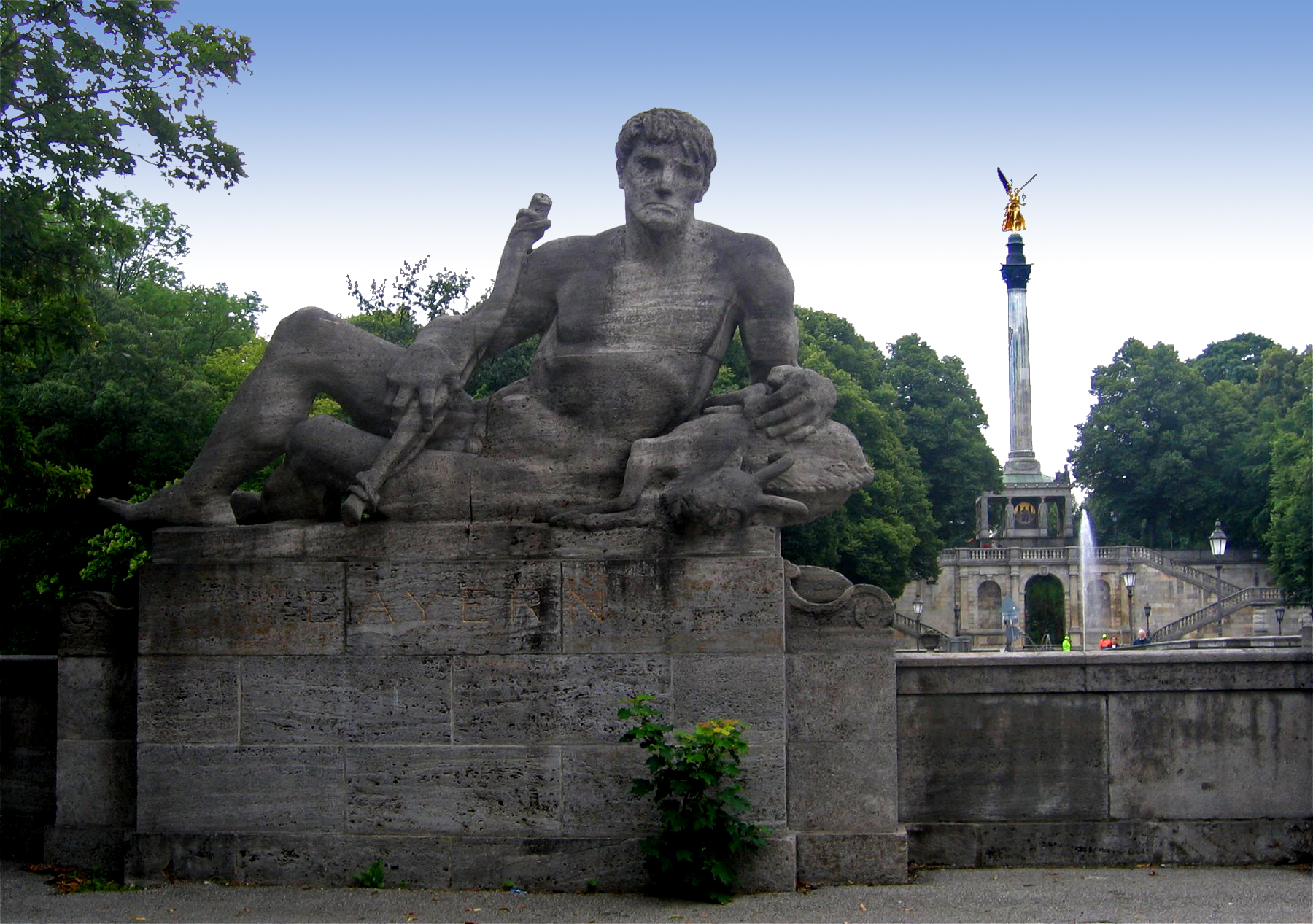
The Hunter (Bavaria), Luitpoldbrücke, Munich

Hermann Hahn (28 November 1868, in Veilsdorf, Germany – 18 August 1945, in Pullach, Germany) was a German sculptor of the early 20th century. His public sculpture can be seen throughout cities in Germany and in Chicago.

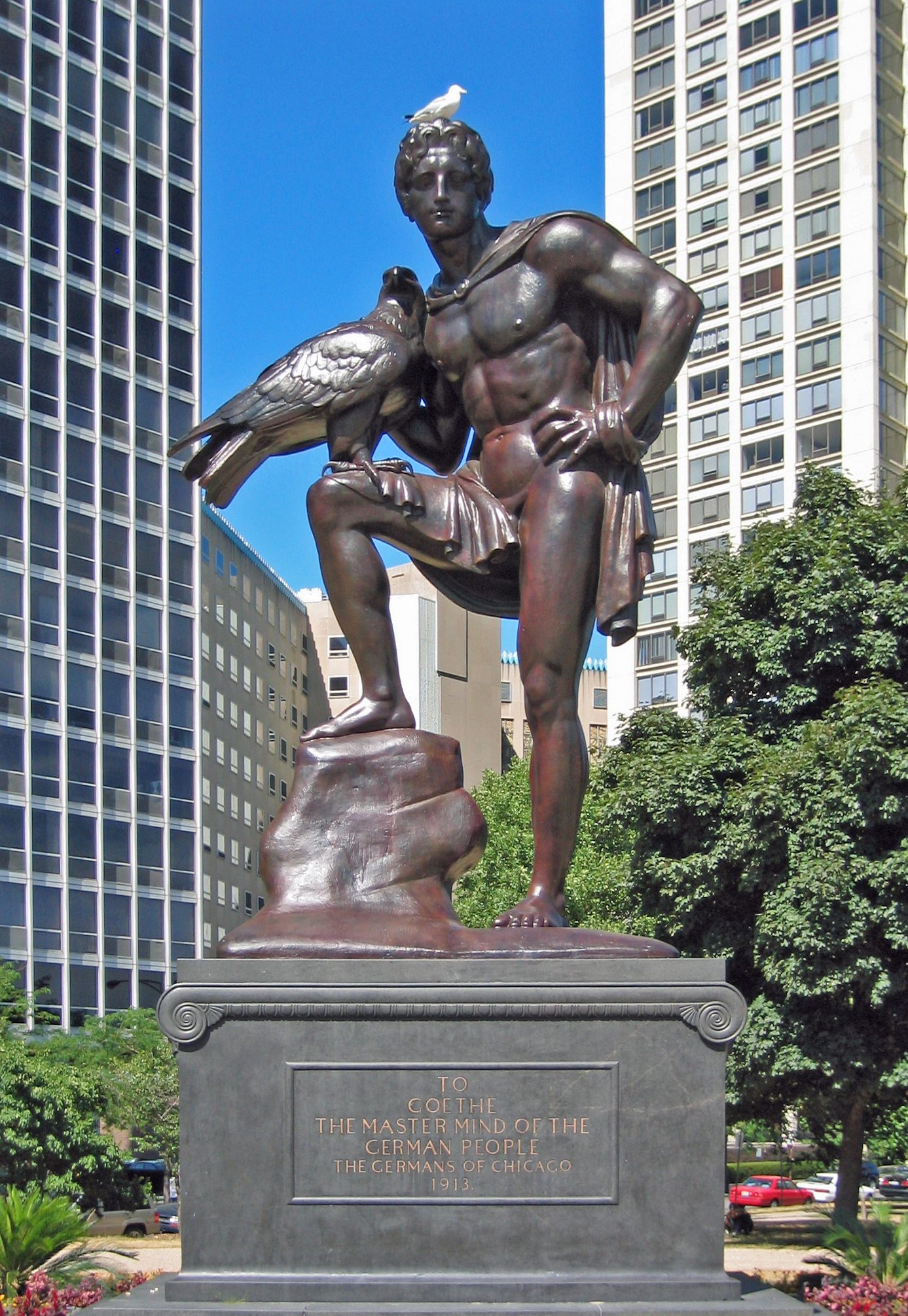
Goethe Monument in Chicago

Hahn was born in 1868 in Veilsdorf. His parents, Adalbert and Ida Hahn, were both involved in the porcelain industry. The Hahns moved to Rudolstadt where Hermann was meant to attend Gymnasium, but he left school in order to study drawing under the Hofmaler Rudolf Oppenheim. He then trained in sculpting wood and in 1887 began his studies in Munich, at the Kunstgewerbeschule and the Akademie der Bildenden Künste. He formed deep ties to Munich and the Akademie, eventually becoming a professor himself and teaching there for decades.

Hahn traveled abroad throughout Europe and was especially influenced by the sculpture of antiquity. He is known for his monumental sculpture in a neoclassical style. He created allegorical figures such as the reclining form of a hunter representing Bavaria at the Luitpoldbrücke (1901) and the Rosselenker in front of the Technische Hochschule in Munich (1928), as well as portraits and memorials of historical figures, such as the Goethe monument in Chicago (1913), the Liszt monument in Weimar (1902), and the Luther monument in Speyer (1904). His work was also part of the art competitions at the 1928 Summer Olympics and the 1936 Summer Olympics.
