= Goethe–Schiller Monument (Milwaukee) =

Public artwork by Ernst Friedrich August Rietschel

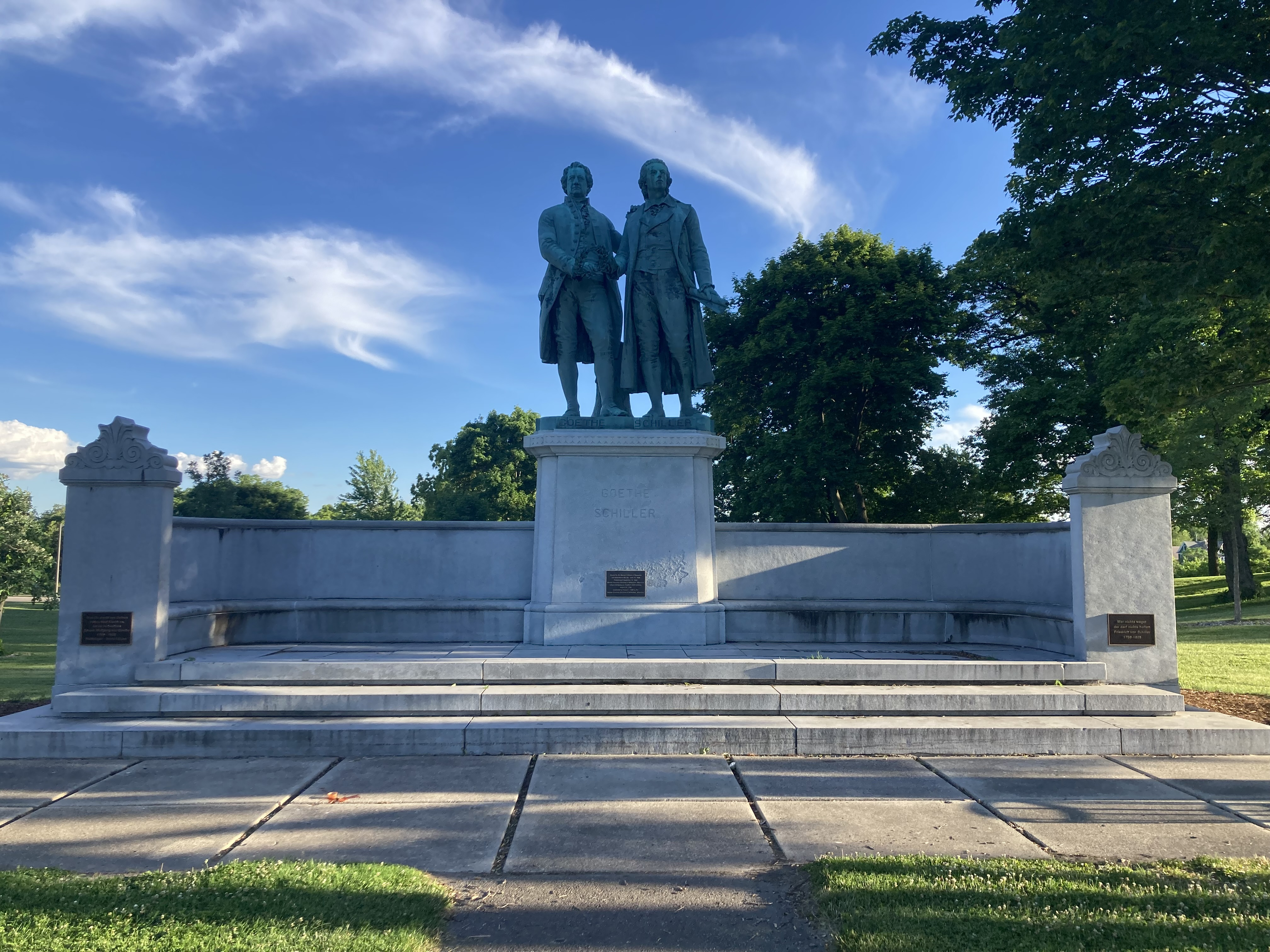
- Artist: Ernst Friedrich August Rietschel
- Year: 1908
- Type: bronze
- Dimensions: 370 cm × 790 cm (144 in × 312 in)
- Location: near 4500 W. Washington Blvd., Milwaukee; 43°03′10.33″N 87°58′12.26″W

The Goethe–Schiller Monument is a public artwork by German artist Ernst Friedrich August Rietschel located in Washington Park, which is in Milwaukee, Wisconsin, United States. The bronze sculpture from 1908 depicts two men, Johann Wolfgang von Goethe and Friedrich von Schiller, one holding a laurel wreath and the other a scroll. The 12 foot artwork rests upon a 26 foot long granite base. The bronze sculpture is a recasting of the statue incorporated into the 1857 Goethe-Schiller Monument in Weimar, Germany.

== Description ==
The Goethe-Schiller Monument consists of two men standing side by side. One of the men, Johann Wolfgang von Goethe passes a laurel wreath to the younger man, Friedrich von Schiller, who holds a scroll in his proper left hand. Goethe is attired in a knee-length coat, a shirt with a ruffled collar, a vest and leggings. Schiller is attired in a mid-calf length coat, a vest and leggings. The sculpture stands atop a tiered granite base containing an exedra. The sculpture has three inscriptions. On the lowest left side of the sculpture it says: RIETSCHEL, ERNEST F. On the front of the plinth, in incised letters, it says: GOETHE SCHILLER. On the front of the base it says: GOETHE SCHILLER. The granite base contains three plaques. The plaque on the left side reads:

Was Du ererbt von Deinen
Vätern hast Erwirb es,
um es zu besitzen

Johann Wolfgang von Goethe
1749–1832
Weltbürger – World Citizen

These are lines from Goethe’s Faust I.i, "That which you inherit from your fathers / You must earn in order to possess."—Goethe’s Faust, trans. Randall Jarrell, p. 35 (1976).

The plaque on the right side reads:

Wer nichts waget
der darf nichts hoffen

Friedrich von Schiller
1759–1805

These lines are from Schiller's Wallenstein: "Who dares nothing, need hope for nothing."

The plaque in the center reads:

Erected by the German Citizens of Wisconsin
and dedicated to the city-June 14, 1908
Rededicated September 4, 1960
German-American Societies of Milwaukee, Wisconsin

Johann Wolfgang von Goethe's 250th birthday
August 28, 1749
celebrated on August 1, 1999 by the
German-American Societies of Milwaukee, Wisconsin

The Goethe-Schiller Monument is administered by the Milwaukee County, Department of Parks, Recreation and Culture.

Short video of sculpture.

== Historical information ==
Johann Wolfgang von Goethe and Friedrich von Schiller were both highly influential German poets, dramatists and writers that became friends in Weimar, Thuringia. The Germans that came to the United States after 1848, as well as the German thinkers who came after 1870, brought Goethe and Schiller's ideas with them.

Originally, the Milwaukee Swabian Benevolent Society wanted to erect a monument to Schiller, a fellow Swabian, but other Milwaukee German societies wanted to participate in the monument's creation. In 1902 thirty organizations and various private donors, including local families such as the Vogels, Brumders, and Nunnemachers, formed a monument association to raise funds for the artwork. They raised $10,000 for the monument and $5,000 for the pedestal. "In 1908, a coalition of German groups had little trouble agreeing that Germania in Milwaukee should be represented by a copy of the bronze statue created by artist Ernest Rietschel for the front of the Dresden Court Theater in Weimar, Saxony. The larger community was quick to accept the monument." The Milwaukee monument was thus cast by the foundry in Lauchhammer, Germany from Rietschel's original 1857 mold.

The monument was dedicated on June 12, 1908 as part of a great celebration that included thousands of people singing and reading Goethe's and Schiller's works, a dedication speech by Christian Steger, and a gymnastics demonstration. The monument had to be moved from its previous location in Washington Park to its current location west of the Emil Blatz Temple of Music in 1960 because of Highway 41's location. The rededication ceremonies took place on September 1, 1960. A time capsule that had been placed in the base of the monument was found. It contained both German and English newspapers and magazines, records of the Schiller-Goethe Association and copies of the Milwaukee Journal Sentinel and Social Democratic Herald.

There are four Goethe-Schiller Monuments in the United States, each incorporating a copy of Rietschel's 1857 bronze in Weimar. In addition to Milwaukee, they are in San Francisco (1901), Cleveland (1907), and Syracuse (1911).
