= Goethe Monument (Berlin) =

Sculpture in Berlin, Germany

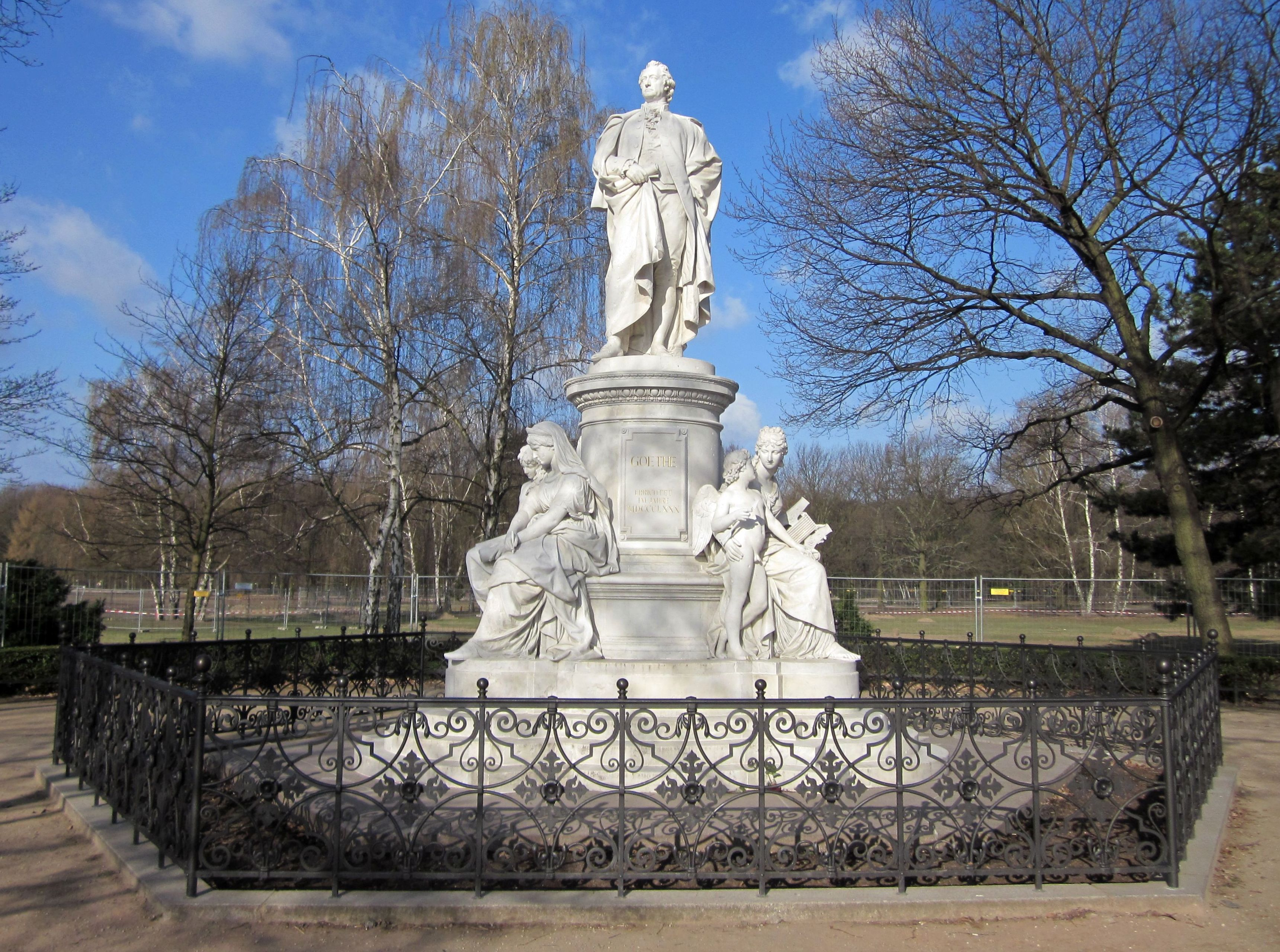
- The memorial in 2011
- Location: Berlin, Germany; 52.5138°N 13.3764°E

The Goethe Monument (German: Das Goethe-Denkmal) is an outdoor 1880 memorial to German writer and statesman Johann Wolfgang von Goethe by Fritz Schaper, located in Tiergarten in Berlin, Germany. The sculpture's base depicts the allegorical figures of Drama, Lyric Poetry (and Amor), and Science.

== See also ==
- 1880 in art
