= Athy (harpist) =

Argentinian harpist and composer

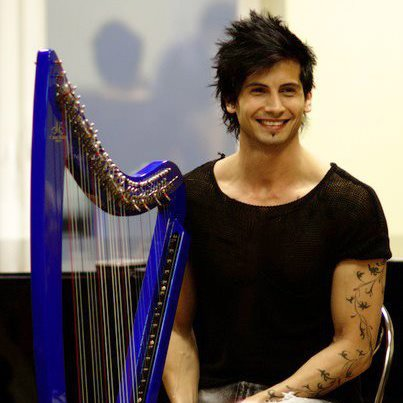
- Athy, the electric harp player.

Background information
- Born: February 28, 1984 (age 42); Ituzaingó, Buenos Aires, Argentina
- Origin: Argentina
- Genres: flamenco, blues
- Occupations: Musician, harpist, composer
- Instruments: Harp, celtic harp, electric harp
- Years active: 2003 - present
- Website: Athy harpist

Athy (also known as Athy, the electric harper) (born 28 February 1984, Ituzaingó, Buenos Aires. Argentina) is a musician and composer who plays electric harp and Celtic harp.

== Music career ==
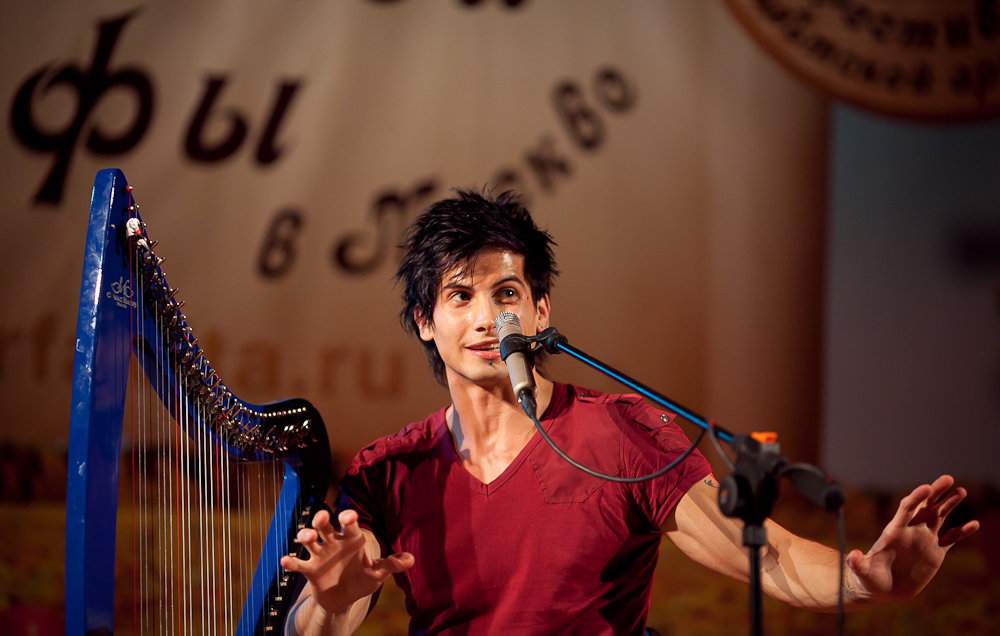
Athy in concert, Moscow, 2011.

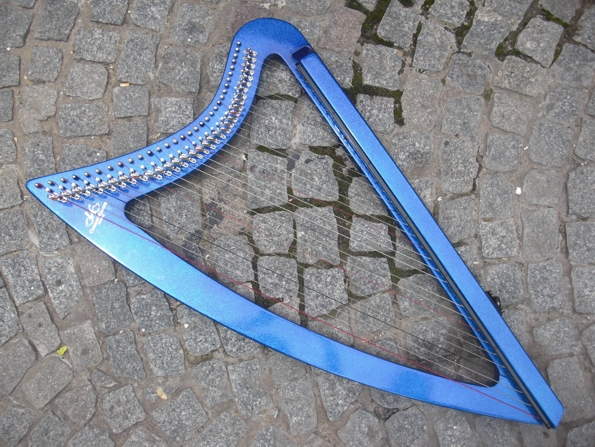
Harp by Camac Harps, France.

Athy's musical style contains romantic, flamenco, blues, Celtic and Arabic elements. Athy promotes harp music in Argentina. In 2007, Athy's second album Sabour a Tiershra was released. In 2011, he gave a concert and a master class at the Moscow Festival of the Celtic Harp АРФАVITA. He played Libertango by Astor Piazzolla. Athy's third album, Harp Seduction, was released in 2013. His professional persona is an irreverent neo-romantic with tattoos and body piercing. Athy carries his harp when he performs.

Athy has performed at the Teatro Colón, Buenos Aires, Centro Cultural Borges, La Casona del Teatro, La Casa del Poeta and Velma Café. In 2007, Athy participated in a television program about the harp, Instrumentos, (Canal (a) Argentina, 2007). In 2007, he also performed in Cosmopolitan Calendar 2007. He played his work, Lágrimas en la Oscuridad. In 2008, Camac Harps, France, sponsored Athy's performances. He was given an acoustic Celtic concert harp and two electric harps, called "Blue Light", made of carbon fiber.

In 2009 Athy performed for the UN in the city of Tigre, Argentina, at Recicl Arte, to promote environmentalism. He also performed at the 26th and 27th Rencontres internationales de harpe Celtique at Dinan, the Vale do Café festival, Vossauras, Brazil, the IV at the Rio Harp festival, Rio de Janeiro, Brazil, the Festival Interceltique de Lorient for Camac Harps' fortieth anniversary, the Great Evening of Celtic Harp, and a master class, the Celtic Music Festival Franco-Italian Celtica in 2010 and 2011, and represented Argentina at the 4th annual World Harp Festival in Asuncion, Paraguay in 2010. He also performed at the Château de Clisson and the Château de Châteaubriant. In 2009, Athy won a harp in the first Trophy Camac competition organized by Camac Harps of France, held in Courmayeur, Italy.

In 2011, Athy accompanied Project 12, the Dominic Graham's Celtic ballet in Northern Ireland (Portrush), in his ballet work, Entwined Hearts. He also concertised in Ireland and on 2 July 2012, Val Veny, Italy.

Athy has performed with The Chieftains, Cécile Corbel, Vincenzo Zitello, Carlos Núñez Muñoz, Antonio Olmos (guitar), Pamela Schweblin (Irish bagpipes and Irish whistles), Nicolas Cuadro (percussion), Javier Rondó (batería), Luz Yacianci (voz) Gustavo Echeverria (violin), Daniela Sigaud (violin), Celtic Argentina (Irish Dancing ), Marcela Cerruti (piano), Adrian Albornoz (electric bass), Nadia Birkenstock (electric harp), Clotilde Trouillaud (electric harp) and Aida Delfino (Celtic harp).

On 26 May 2012, Athy performed at the Festival International de la Harpe, held during the celebration of the 40th anniversary of Camac at Ancenis.

== Other career ==
Athy also works as a model. In 2008, he was employed in an advertising campaign for the Silhouette electric harp for Lyon & Healy, Chicago.

Athy participated in the reality television show El Casting de la tele, Canal 13, Argentina. He finished as the semi-finalist.

== Discography ==
- 2005 : Solas an Anama / Luz del Alma, Kisur Records, Argentine.
- 2007 : Sabour a Tiershra; «Natural Way», Sonobook, Argentine.
- 2013: Harp Seduction. "Freak Harp Music". Argentine.
- 2014: Mo domhan draíochta: Mi Mágico Mundo. Fantasy tracks from "Luz del Alma","Sabour a Tiershra" and "Harp Seduction". "Freak Harp Music".. Argentine.

== Titles of some compositions of Athy ==
- Vals Feérico
- Lágrimas en la Oscuridad
- Nenúfar
- Mándalas de Piel
- Seres del Fuego
- Mi Hada del Bosque
- Nostalgia con Variaciones
- Misterios detrás del Espejo
- Fairy´s Heart – Cuando Danzan las Estrellas “Jig”
- Indigo Profundo
- Exile
- El Ultimo Unicornio Negro
- Alas del Alma
- Cobrizo Amanecer
- Cinnamon reel
- Un Erizo en la Noche
- The Dark Fig
- Mum in hurry in the kitchen
- Danzando en el Aire
- Plegaria
- Brisa del Valle
- Acuarius
- Entwinned Hearts, Composed for the Irish dance group of Dominic Graham.
- Cuchuflo´s Jig
- Luna de Marrakech
- Un Domingo en Maipú y Corrientes
- Dulce Bretaña,(Valse pour la Bretagne) Composed for the "Interceltique Festival de Lorient".
- Magali
- Sunshine in Paris
- La resurrección del Fenix
- Atlantis
- Cuervos en la Noche
- Origami / The Resurrection of Japan Composed in honour of the victims of the tsunami in Japan.
- The Blue Harp Set
- Ruperto´s Crazy Night
- First love
- Esperando a Soléne
- Lazos de Cristal
- Delfina´s Aura
- El lamento de la Mandolina
- Entre la Oscuridad
- Los Encantados Cisnes de Lir
- Renacer Celeste
- Sueña en una Estrella
- Cobrizo Amanecer
- Harper´s March
- Lamento judío
- Si tengo el Cabello Azul… Y que?!!
- Fuerte como el Roble...

== Harp (or Piano) Sheet music ==
- 2012: Dulce Bretaña, Freak Harp Music. Creighton's Collection
- 2012: Seres del Fuego, Freak Harp Music. Creighton's Collection
- 2012: Libertango (Astor Piazzolla, Arr. for Electric Harp), Freak Harp Music. Creighton's Collection
- 2013: Cuchuflo´s Jig, Freak Harp Music. Creighton's Collection
- 2013: Atlantis. Freak Harp Music. Creighton's Collection
- 2013: Perfume a Tango. Freak Harp Music. Creighton's Collection
- 2013: Varikset yössä. "Cuervos en la Noche". Rhapsody for Electric Harp. Freak Harp Music. Creighton's Collection
- 2013: Du'n Geimhin · Entwined Hearts. For Lever Harp, Pedal Harp or Piano. Freak Harp Music. Creighton's Collection
- 2014: Origami 折り紙. For Lever Harp, Pedal Harp or Piano. Freak Harp Music. Creighton's Collection.

== Videoclips ==
- 2013: Origami 折り紙. (Harp Seduction) Directed by Nicolás Ravagnan. "Los Imaginarios"
- 2013: Perfume a Tango. (Harp Seduction) Directed by Nicolás Ravagnan. "Los Imaginarios"
- 2013: Dulce Bretaña (Valse pour la Bretagna). Produced by Cat Studio.
- 2013: The Phoenix Resurrection. Directed by Nicolás Ravagnan.

== Instruments ==
- Electro 36 Mirror Black Finish, Les harpes Camac, France.
- DHC Blue Light Purple Metal Flakes & Gold, Les harpes Camac, France.

== See also ==
- Interview with Athy 2003 (es)
- "El Artista punk", Clase ejecutiva, El Cronista commercial, Argentina, 2012.
- Athy, artista y compositor contemporáneo, en arperia.com (in Spanish)
- Weblog de l'artiste (in Spanish)
