= Santiago Soldati =

Santiago Soldati (born February 11, 1943) is a prominent Argentine businessman.

== Career ==
Santiago Soldati was born to Francisco Soldati, a nephew of the founder of the Villa Lugano neighborhood of Buenos Aires, José Francisco Soldati, and the owner of the city's largest utility, the Italian-Argentine Electric Company. His father bought controlling interest in Sociedad Comercial del Plata (SCP), a holding company with varied interests, primarily real estate, in 1965, and expanded the company into petroleum transport. Raised in a family of Swiss descent (José Francisco had been born in Lugano), Soldati was educated in Switzerland.

The family's growing prominence made them a target to left-wing extremism during the 1970s, however, and in April 1973, Santiago Soldati was kidnapped by the Montoneros, who released him after payment of a US$1.5 million ransom. His father ultimately lost his life in a November 1979 bombing carried out by the same group, in one of their last attacks. He became President of SCP when his elder brother, Francisco, died in a polo accident in 1991.

Soldati took control of SCP at a time when Argentine President Carlos Menem and Economy Minister Domingo Cavallo were advancing an ambitious privatizations policy. SCP became a minority shareholder in newly privatized television, telephone, natural gas, electricity, freight rail services, as well as the metro Buenos Aires water utility. These became Telefé, Telefónica de Argentina, Transportadora del Gas del Norte, Transener, Ferroexpreso Pampeano and Aguas Argentinas, respectively, during the early 1990s. Soldati invested part of his diversified earnings into two tourist attractions: the Tren de la Costa railway, and the Parque de la Costa amusement park. The first he developed by securing a concession in 1993 to operate the formerly state-owned Ferrocarril Central Argentino route between the northern Buenos Aires suburbs of Olivos and Tigre, in disuse since 1961. Following the recovery of derelict rails and stations, and the purchase of new equipment, the 16 km (10 mi) "Coastal Train" was inaugurated in April 1995, helping revive the largely upscale area's real estate market.

Soldati was elected President of the Argentine Business Council, for a two-year term, in 1997. As the largest shareholder in Aguas Argentinas (with 20 percent), SCP profited by Soldati's decision in 1998 to sell its stake to Paris-based Suez, which paid SCP US$150 million for its shares, or three times what Soldati's company had paid in 1993. The sale of the profitable unit was partly motivated by growing debts at SCP, however, whose revenue forecast was dampened by the local effects during 1995-96 of the Mexican peso crisis. Its US$715 million debt was nearly double its book value, and in 1997, SCP divested itself of the natural gas processing concerns had under its Compañía General de Combustibles (CGC) unit for US$230 million, most of which had to be earmarked for debt retirement.

Controlling CPC, the nation's second-largest construction company, Soldati shed a half ownership stake in the builder, as well as 100% of the Ban gas company, by 1998. SCP, however, defaulted on a US$25 million debt in April 1999, which effectively shut it out of the corporate bond market. The principal drain on the group's finances had reportedly been its US$400 million investment in the two, suburban Buenos Aires tourist attractions: the Tren and Parque de la Costa, which were operated at a loss, and whose startup debt became difficult to service.

Negotiations with creditors followed, but a lawsuit filed against SCP by US-based Reef Exploration in 2000 over the sale of a subsidiary to Shell Petroleum led to Soldati's decision to file for SCP's bankruptcy in September of that year. The sale of a number of energy related interests to Techint, the Argentine multinational registered in Luxembourg, could not rescue SCP from bankruptcy, and in 2004, Soldati divested it of 81% of its CGC unit, which was sold to local household chemicals maker TVB.

That year, SCP's bankruptcy was approved in court, which granted it an 80% discharge of a debt which had grown to US$1.2 billion, by then. The discharge allowed SCP to enter into a modest venture with Millicom, a Luxembourg-based mobile phone network provider, which resulted in Latin America's first WiMax network.

A personal friend of British businessman Peter Munk, Soldati lobbied in favor of Barrick Gold during 2009. Barrick, the gold mining giant co-founded by Munk in 1983, had been exploring a potentially large deposit straddling the Argentina-Chile border along the Andes mountain range, and ultimately obtained approval to mine the Pascua Lama field from both jurisdictions. SCP's legal problems continued, however, as the bankruptcy ruling had been appealed by a commercial court prosecutor in 2006, and in October 2009, the Argentine Supreme Court struck down the earlier ruling, citing irregularities in the shareholders' meeting convened to approve the bankruptcy.

Citing his having reached retirement age, Soldati stepped down as the President of SCP on December 31, 2009. His wife, Eva Thesleff de Soldati, is the President of the Friends of the San Martín Theatre Foundation.
