= Paul Patterson (composer) =

British composer (born 1947)

Paul Patterson (born 15 June 1947) is a British composer and Manson Professor of Composition at the Royal Academy of Music.

== Career ==
Patterson studied trombone and composition at the Royal Academy of Music. One of his teachers was Richard Rodney Bennett. He returned there to become Head of Composition and Contemporary Music until 1997, when he became Manson Professor of Composition. A regular guest on composition competition panels both in the UK and further afield, his devotion to new music, along with his desire to introduce the music of contemporary masters to students (in both composition and performance fields), has resulted in the creation of annual festivals devoted to a single composer at the Academy.

He has worked with South East Arts, the University of Warwick, the London Sinfonietta and is currently Composer-in-Residence with the National Youth Orchestra of Great Britain and celebrated his tenth year with them in 2007.

Patterson has produced a number of large-scale choral works, most notably the Mass of the Sea (1983), Stabat Mater (1986), Te Deum (1988) the Millennium Mass (2000).

His works are performed regularly by leading performers in the United Kingdom and abroad, most popular among which are the orchestral setting of Roald Dahl's Little Red Riding Hood and the Violin Concerto. In 2017 Patterson was the composer in residence for the 13th World Harp Congress in Hong Kong, which featured premiers of his works Scorpions (with stings in their tails) and Cantonese Images.

Patterson was awarded the John Armitage Memorial Commission for 2005. For this, he composed The Fifth Continent, a work for solo counter tenor, choir, brass quintet and organ, which received its premiere in Southwark Cathedral in March 2005. Other awards include the PRS/RPS Leslie Boosey Award and a Gold Medal from the Polish Ministry of Culture.

Recent commissions include a Double Bass Concerto for Leon Bosch, premiered at the Minehead Festival in 2018 and Mosquitoes, for the 4 Girls 4 Harps first performed in the Ryedale Festival in 2015.

CD releases have included The Three Little Pigs and Little Red Riding Hood, narrated by the TV presenter Chris Jarvis, with the London Philharmonic under David Parry, the Cello Concerto with Raphael Wallfisch and the South West German Chamber Orchestra (Pforzheim), Mass of the Sea with Ann Mackay, Christopher Keyte and the Royal Philharmonic Orchestra conducted by Geoffrey Simon, and his Phoenix Concerto with Emily Pailthorpe and the English Chamber Orchestra.

His Opus 50 Luslawice Variations for solo violin, was included on Tasmin Little's free to download CD of recordings as part of her Three Step Challenge.

== Selected works ==
=== Orchestral ===
- Sonors, Op.17 (1973)
- Fusions, Op.23 (1974), for orchestra & electronics
- Circular Ruins, Op.31 (1975)
- Clarinet Concerto, Op.34 (1976), for clarinet & string orchestra
- Concerto for Orchestra, Op.45 (1981)
- Sinfonia, Op.46 (1982), for string orchestra
- Upside-Down-Under Variations, Op.56 (1985)
- Violin Concerto, Op.72 (1992), for violin & string orchestra
- Roald Dahl's "Little Red Riding Hood, Op.73 (1992), for Narrators and Full Orchestra
- Four Rustic Sketches, Op.80 (1997)
- The City Within, Op.87 (2000)
- Jubilee Dances, Op.89 (2002)
- Cello Concerto, Op.90 (2002), for cello & string orchestra
- Roald Dahl's The Three Little Pigs, Op.73 (2003), for Narrator and Full Orchestra
- Orchestra on Parade, Op.94 (2004)
- Allusions, Op.99 (2007), for two violins & string orchestra
- Viola Concerto, Op. 101 (2008–09), for viola & string orchestra
- Phoenix Concerto, Op. 102 (2009), for oboe & string orchestra
- Arabesque (2009)

=== Choral ===
- The Little Red Riding Hood Song Book Op.77 (1994), for S.S.A choir and piano
- Voices of Sleep, Op.40 (1979), for S.A.T.B. choir & orchestra
- Mass of the Sea, Op.47 (1983), for soprano & bass soli, S.A.T.B. choir & orchestra
- Missa Brevis, Op.54 (1985), for a cappella S.A.T.B. choir
- Hell's Angels, Op.81 (1998), for soprano solo, S.A.T.B. choir, four percussion & string quartet
- Gloria, Op.83 (1999), for soprano & tenor soli, S.A.T.B. choir & orchestra
- Millennium Mass, Op.85 (1999), for soprano solo, S.A.T.B. choir, organ & chamber orchestra
- The Fifth Continent, Op.96 (2005), for counter-tenor/mezzo-soprano solo, S.A.T.B. choir, brass quintet & organ

=== Chamber ===
- Propositions. (1987), for harmonica and string octet
- Deviations, Op.88 (2001), for string octet
- Tate Modern Mobiles, Op.91 (2003), for ensemble
- Elegiac Blues, Op.97 (2005), for violin/cello & piano
- Aguecheek's Antics, Op.98 (2005), for violin & piano

=== Solo Instrumental ===
- Spiders, Op.48 (1983), for harp
- Luslawice Variations, Op.50 (1984), for violin
- Tides of Mananan, Op.64 (1988), for viola
- A Tunnel of Time, Op.66 (1989), for piano
- Soliloquy, Op.79 (1995), for clarinet
- Bugs, Op.93 (2003), for harp
- Tsunami, Op.95 (2005), for organ
- Brumba, Op.100 (2007), for organ
