= Electric harp =

Musical instrument

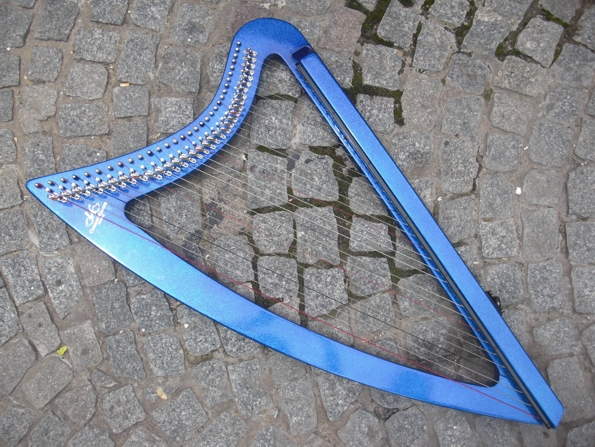
A Camac electric harp

The electric harp is an instrument based on its acoustic original. There are both solid-body and hollow body electro-acoustic models available. True electric harps have a solid body versus a hollow body electro-acoustic harp, which can be played either acoustically or electronically. A true electric solid-body harp cannot be played acoustically since it has no hollow soundbox, and must be amplified when played.

== Early models ==
Alan Stivell writes in his book Telenn, la harpe bretonne of his first dreams of electric harps going back to the late 1950s. He designed and had made a solid body (after different electric-acoustic harps) electric harp at the turn of the 1970s–80s, about the same time as Rudiger Oppermann. Alan Stivell later (early 80s) had a meeting with Joel Garnier who decided to create a model. Alan Stivell later worked independently with Leo Goas-Straajer to design and build several one-off models, before his final experiment with Camac. The first such commercially manufactured instrument was made by Camac, also helped later by the request of jazz-pop harpist Deborah Henson-Conant. The result looked like a light framed Celtic-style harp, but each string had a crystal (Piezo) pickup at its base. They can be plugged into various amplification systems, and players are able to use effects pedals similarly to electric guitar players. Another part of Henson-Conant's request was that she should be able to move around the stage with the harp, and thus the smaller electric harps usually include a system to strap the harp to one's body.

== Function ==
Solid-body electric harps are usually lever harps, though solid body pedal harps have also been built. Since the cost of a pedal harp is so high, it is more economical for a harpist to purchase an electro-acoustic model of pedal harp, as it can also be played without amplification.

An electro-acoustic harp looks nearly identical to a regular acoustic harp, whether lever or pedal. It has piezo pickups at the base of each string, and some also contain a separate microphone inside the soundbox, enabling the harpist to mix the signals from both kinds of pickups to produce special effects. Often such harps include an onboard preamplifier. One of the most famous electro-acoustic pedal harp models is Camac's "Big Blue", finished in a striking electric blue colour.

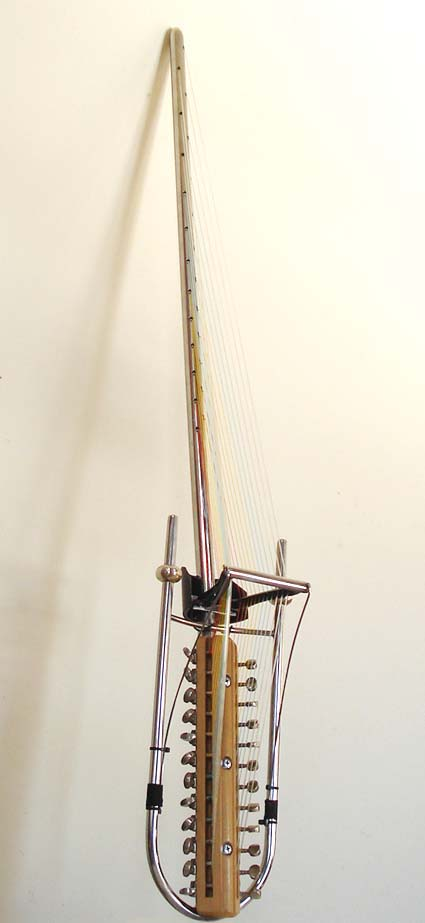
Signature Series Gravikord

In the late 20th century instrument builder and American musician Robert Grawi created an electric double harp-lute based on the West African kora but strung and tuned differently. The gravikord is a light ergonomically designed instrument made of modern materials mostly stainless steel tubing. It was created to enable easier playing of complex African cross rhythms on an African derived modern electro-acoustic harp. It is a double harp that has 24 strings evenly divided in two ranks arrayed on a free standing "Vee" shaped bridge made of synthetic material including an integral piezo-electric sensor.

== Performers ==
- 4 Girls 4 Harps play on both pearlescent electric harps and Salvi concert harps.
- Athy (harpist), Atilio Adrían Matteucci, electric harpist from Argentina, composer, performs on a Blue Light Camac electric harp and plays his own music, his compositions are Atonal, Dark, Impressionist, Dramatic, and experimental.
- Deborah Henson-Conant performs on a solid body Camac electric harp, as well as amplified and regular pedal harps. Her style is mostly jazz, blues, and pop.
- Camille and Kennerly Kitt, electric harp duo, The Harp Twins, perform and arrange rock/pop on Lyon and Healy Silhouette solid body electric harps, as well as Camac electro-acoustic concert grand pedal harps.
- Rüdiger Oppermann performs on his self-made electric harps.
- Zeena Parkins plays and composes avant-garde and experimental music. Played on several Björk albums and tours.
- Roberto Perera, original Latin jazz on the amplified Peruvian harp.
- Alan Stivell performs on his own designed electric harps (since early 80s).
- Kristan Toczko One of Canada’s premier harpists, Kristan Toczko is recognized for her radiant tone and expressive music making.
- Andreas Vollenweider plays New Age and pop style music.

== See also ==
- Laser harp
