= Sociedad Comercial del Plata =

Argentine consortium

Sociedad Comercial del Plata S.A.
- Company type: Sociedad Anónima
- Traded as: BCBA: COME; MERVAL component
- Industry: Petroleum; Construction; Transport
- Founded: 1927; 99 years ago
- Headquarters: Buenos Aires, Argentina
- Key people: Ignacio Noel (Chairman); Pablo Arnaude (Director); Matías Brea (Director)
- Services: Fuel; Rail freight transport
- Revenue: ▲US$ 185.2 million (2012)
- Net income: ▲US$185.8 million (2012)
- Number of employees: 2,500
- Subsidiaries: Cia. Gral. de Combustibles; Canteras Cerro Negro; Destilería Arg. de Petróleo; Ferroexpreso Pampeano (18%); Tren de la Costa (1995–2013)
- Website: scp.com.ar

Sociedad Comercial del Plata is a diversified Argentine holding company, with interests primarily in the energy, rail transport, real estate, and tourism sectors.

== Overview ==
Sociedad Comercial del Plata was founded in Buenos Aires on June 7, 1927, and became a holding company with varied interests, primarily real estate. Francisco Soldati (a nephew of José Francisco Soldati, the owner of the city's largest utility, the Italian-Argentine Electric Company, and founder of the Villa Lugano ward of Buenos Aires) bought controlling interest in SCP in 1965, and expanded the company into petroleum transport; he ultimately lost his life in a November 1979 bombing carried out by the far-left Montoneros terrorist group, in one of their last attacks.

His son, Francisco, became President of SCP in 1976. SCP remained focused on its fuel and electricity, and established a realty, Del Plata Propiedades, though the group's growth was hampered by the debt and inflation crisis in the local economy during the 1980s. The younger Francisco Soldati died in a polo accident in April 1991.

His younger brother, Santiago Soldati, took control of SCP at a time when Argentine President Carlos Menem and Economy Minister Domingo Cavallo were advancing an ambitious privatizations policy. SCP became a minority shareholder in newly privatized television, telephone, natural gas, electricity, freight rail services, as well as the metro Buenos Aires water utility. These became Telefé, Telefónica de Argentina, Transportadora de Gas del Norte, Transener, Ferroexpreso Pampeano and Aguas Argentinas, respectively, during the early 1990s. SCP also gained control of water utilities in Córdoba, La Plata, and Santa Fe.

Soldati invested part of SCP's earnings into two tourist attractions: the Tren de la Costa railway, and the Parque de la Costa amusement park. The first was developed by securing a concession in 1993 to operate the formerly state-owned Ferrocarril Central Argentino route between the northern Buenos Aires suburbs of Olivos and Tigre, in disuse since 1961. Following the recovery of derelict rails and stations, and the purchase of new equipment, the 16 km (10 mi) "Coastal Train" was inaugurated in April 1995, helping revive the largely upscale area's real estate market.

As the largest shareholder in Aguas Argentinas (with 20 percent), SCP profited by Soldati's decision in 1998 to sell its stake to Paris-based Suez, which paid SCP US$150 million for its shares, or three times what Soldati's company had paid in 1993. The sale of the profitable unit was partly motivated by growing debts at SCP, however, whose revenue forecast was dampened by the local effects during 1995-96 of the Mexican peso crisis. Its US$715 million debt was nearly double its book value, and in 1997, SCP divested itself of the natural gas processing concerns had under its Compañía General de Combustibles (CGC) unit for US$230 million, most of which had to be earmarked for debt retirement.

Controlling CPC, the nation's second-largest construction company, Soldati shed a half ownership stake in the builder, as well as 100% of the BAN gas company, by 1998. SCP, however, defaulted on a US$25 million debt in April 1999, which effectively shut it out of the corporate bond market. The principal drain on the group's finances had reportedly been its US$400 million investment in the two, suburban Buenos Aires tourist attractions: the Tren and Parque de la Costa. Though a majority stake in the latter was sold, their ongoing losses and service costs on their startup debt continued to stymy SCP's balance sheet.

Negotiations with creditors followed, but a lawsuit filed against SCP by US-based Reef Exploration in 2000 over the sale of a subsidiary to Shell Petroleum led to Soldati's decision to file for SCP's bankruptcy in September of that year. The sale of a number of energy related interests to Techint, the Argentine multinational registered in Luxembourg, could not rescue SCP from bankruptcy, and in 2004, Soldati divested it of 81% of its CGC unit, which was sold to local household chemicals maker The Value Brand.

That year, SCP's bankruptcy was approved in court, which granted it an 80% discharge of a debt which had grown to US$1.2 billion, by then. The discharge allowed SCP to enter into a modest venture with Millicom, a Luxembourg-based mobile phone network provider, which resulted in Latin America's first WiMax network.

SCP's legal problems continued, however, as the bankruptcy ruling had been appealed by a commercial court prosecutor in 2006, and in October 2009, the Argentine Supreme Court struck down the earlier ruling, citing irregularities in the shareholders' meeting convened to approve the bankruptcy.

Citing his having reached retirement age, Soldati stepped down as the President of SCP on December 31, 2009, and designated Ignacio Noel as the new one.
