= Rüdiger Oppermann =

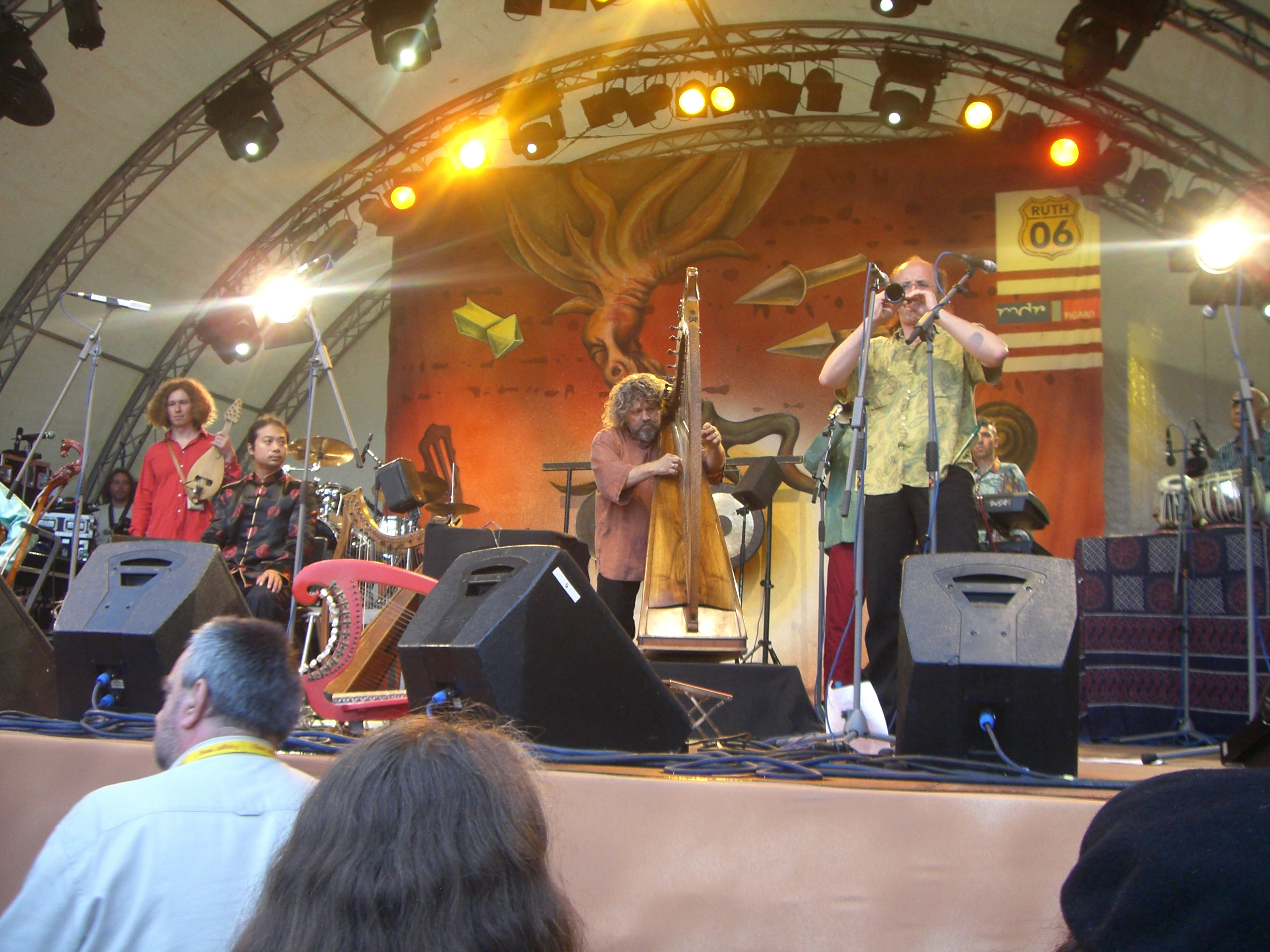
Rüdiger Oppermann at TFF.Rudolstadt, Germany's largest Folk and World Music Festival, July 2006

Rüdiger Oppermann (born 1954) is a German harpist and experimental musician. He specializes in the Celtic harp, which he began playing in 1973. His instrument, a custom-made clàrsach, has 38 gold-plated bronze strings and a special mechanism that allows him to bend notes in a manner akin to blues musicians; a style that he often adopts in his improvisations. He has also developed electro-acoustic instruments.

A peripatetic musician devoted to exploring all musical cultures, Oppermann has collaborated with folk musicians from around the world (particularly Africa and Asia), who he often invites to play at his Klangwelten music festival in Germany. Yet, he favours an experimental approach in playing traditional melodies, often involving improvisation, unusual instrumentation and sometimes even electronics, including digital-delay effects. He has written and performed music for dance theatre productions and small jazz-influenced combos in addition to folk music ensembles.

A musician with a wide and eclectic artistic vision, he has dedicated his compositions to artists as diverse as medieval mystics such as Rumi and Hildegard von Bingen, fellow harpists such as Alan Stivell and Deborah Conant, and modern-day rock and jazz improvisors on electric guitar. He also recorded one album with jazz harpist Park Stickney. Oppermann's records usually feature some solo performances on the wire-strung Celtic harp alongside band pieces involving folk musicians from around the world (playing traditional instruments), and sometimes a few jazz musicians, to accompany him.

Rudiger Oppermann might be best described as a free-style and experimental folk musician, who draws on both ancient and modern musics and musical traditions, to create a melting pot of musical cultures that cannot be ascribed to any one folk tradition. On the sleeve notes to his record 'Unchain my Harp' (1994), he described himself as seeking to create "fresh buds on old trees with strong roots."

He is married to the classical harpist Cynthia (Mowery) Oppermann. He does not play classical music himself but his compositions, often involving intimate ensemble playing, can have some similar qualities to chamber music or early music ensembles, notwithstanding their electro-acoustic sound or frequent use of non-European rhythms and percussion. The classical violinist Yehudi Menuhin was one of the first internationally renowned artists to express appreciation for Oppermann's artistic originality and very distinctive musical sound. A winner of international harp competitions during the mid-1980s, more recently he has won awards in Germany in recognition of his contribution to "world music" and the innovative nature of his Klangwelten music festival. Since 2000, he has operated a small independent record label, Klangwelten Records, which has issued some albums of classical music in addition to folk music records and many of his own projects.

== Discography ==
- 1974: Live in Ingelheim (Sampler/Songbird)
- 1981: Zongo
- 1983: Der fliegende Teppich (self-published)
- 1984: Silberfluss live (self-published)
- 1985: Live at Findhorn (Findhorn Records)
- 1985: Reise nach Harfistan (Wundertüte)
- 1986: Silberfluss (Wundertüte)
- 1987: KlangWelten (Sampler/Wundertüte)
- 1988: Neues aus Harfistan (Wundertüte)
- 1988: Rosen und Dornen (Wirkstatt)
- 1990: KlangWelten (Sampler/Network)
- 1990: Harp Attack Live (self-published)
- 1990: Durchs Wilde Harfistan (Wundertüte)
- 1990: Troubadix Rache (Single/Wundertüte)
- 1991: Changing Tide (Harp Attack/Shamrock)
- 1992: Same Sun, Same Moon (live) (Shamrock)
- 1992: Rudolstadt Festival (Sampler/Rudolstadt)
- 1993: Unchain My Harp (Biber)
- 1994: Rendez-Vous 2 (Sampler/Biber)
- 1994: Acoustic Special (Sampler/Shamrock)
- 1995: Planet Soup (Sampler/Ellipsis arts)
- 1996: The Art Of Harp, Vol. 1 (Sampler/Shamrock)
- 1996: From Worldbeat To Blue Note (Sampler/Shamrock)
- 1996: Its Only Kraut (Sampler/Profolk)
- 1996: Das vertonte Dorf (SBW Russbach)
- 1997: Sanddorn, Musik für TanzTheater (Rigolo)
- 1997: Karawane (Shamrock)
- 1997: Harpestry (Sampler/PolyGram)
- 1997: The Art Of Harp, Vol. 2 (Sampler/Shamrock)
- 1997: Music For Friends (Sampler/Network)
- 1998: Celtic Harpestry (CD und Video/PolyGram)
- 1998: Fragile Balance (Shamrock)
- 1999: Spirit Of The Steppe (Naturaufnahmen/Shamrock)
- 1999: The Art Of Harp, Vol. 3/4 (Doppel-CD/Shamrock)
- 2000: Songs Of The Wind (Windharp, Bauer)
- 2000: KlangWelten 2000 (Sampler/KlangWelten Records)
- 2001: Weit die Füsse tragen... (KlangWelten Records/Wirkstatt)
- 2001: Contemplations On The Earth (Sampler, Biber)
- 2001: Bauer's Best (Sampler/Bauer Verlag)
- 2001: KlangWelten 2001 (KlangWelten Records)
- 2003: KlangWelten 2003 (Sampler/KlangWelten Records)
- 2004: Harp Summit (Duo mit Park Stickney/KlangWelten Records)
- 2004: Same Sun Same Moon Same Water (Rigolo Dance Theatre)
- 2004: Harp House (Edinburgh International Harp Festival)
- 2004: Same Same But Different (KlangWelten Records)
- 2005: KlangWelten 2005 (Sampler/KlangWelten Records)
- 2006: Wake Up - Best (Sampler/Zounds, 24 Karat Gold-CD, all titles digital remastered, CD-Text)
- 2006: KlangWelten 2006 (Sampler/KlangWelten Records)
- 2007: KlangWelten 2007 "Far East - Far West" (Sampler/KlangWelten Records)
- 2008: KlangWelten - Worldmusic Festival 2008 (Sampler/KlangWelten Records)
- 2010: Dance With Me: selected works for the dance theater and dance floor 1982-2010 (Klangwelten Records)
