= Parque de la Costa =

Amusement park in Tigre, Argentina

Coordinates: 34°25′5.5″S 58°34′34.5″W

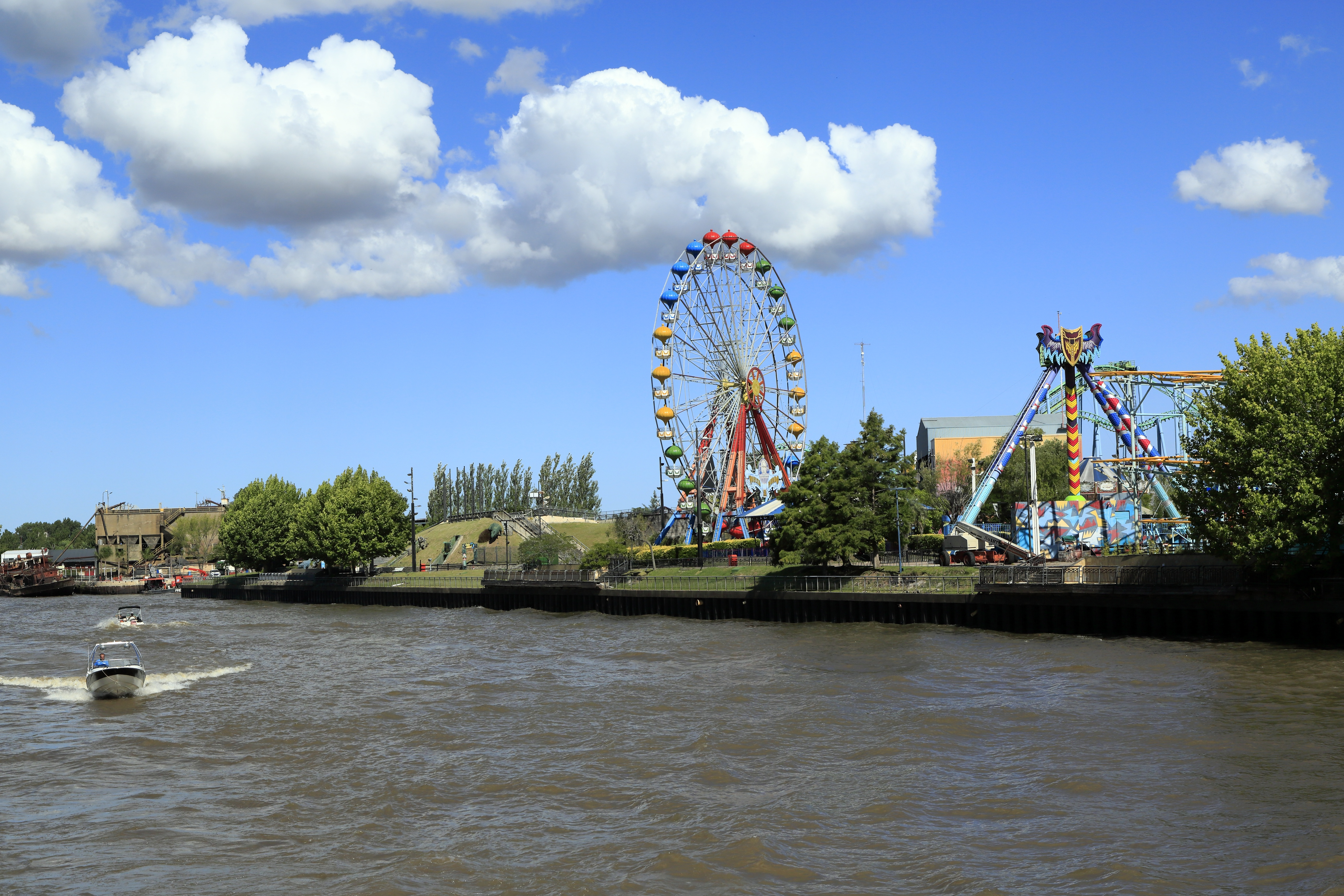
- The park next to the Luján River
- Established: April 10, 1997
- Location: Tigre, Buenos Aires; Argentina
- Visitors: 1.7 million annually
- Website: www.parquedelacosta.com.ar

Parque de la Costa (Spanish: Coast Park) is an amusement park located in Tigre, a northern suburb of Buenos Aires, Argentina.

== Development ==
The park, located on a 14 hectares (35 acres) lot along the Paraná River Delta (on the Luján River), was developed by Santiago Soldati & Walter Álvarez, whose family holding company, SCP, had been bolstered by record earnings in its Compañía General de Combustibles (CGC) unit, an energy sector distributor, during the early and mid-1990s. Its development was preceded by the Tren de la Costa, a 16 km (9.9 mi) tourist light rail line inaugurated in 1995, and connecting Vicente López (just north of Buenos Aires) with the northern suburbs.

Following an investment of nearly US$400 million, the Parque de la Costa was inaugurated on April 10, 1997. The park, connected to the light rail line at the latter's Delta station, originally included Tronador (a Pinfari Zyklon Loop rollercoaster), El Dragón water coaster, the La Vuelta al Mundo ferris wheel, El Octógono stage, an amphitheatre, a musical fountain, and other attractions. The park's projections of 3 million visitors a year failed to materialize, however (traffic was about half that amount).

A series of investments in the late 1990s, including the installation of two, larger rollercoasters (Boomerang and El Vigia), the addition of more live performances, and its reorganization into a theme park, as well as cost-cutting measures, reduced the unit's losses. Debts at SCP of over US$750 million continued to jeopardize its operations, however, particularly following incidents in 1999, in which two rollercoaster passengers entered into a coma, or lost their lives, allegedly due to the ride's excessive speed.

A two-thirds share in the park, which netted around US$30 million in annual sales, was transferred to SCP's creditors after the company entered into an bankruptcy proceedings in 2000; a major project, the Rapidos del Delta water ride, was cancelled as a result, though other rollercoasters, built by the Dutch firm Vekoma, were opened in subsequent years. The park and Tren de la Costa (which remained in SCP ownership) helped revitalize the mainly upscale real estate market in the northern suburbs of Buenos Aires.

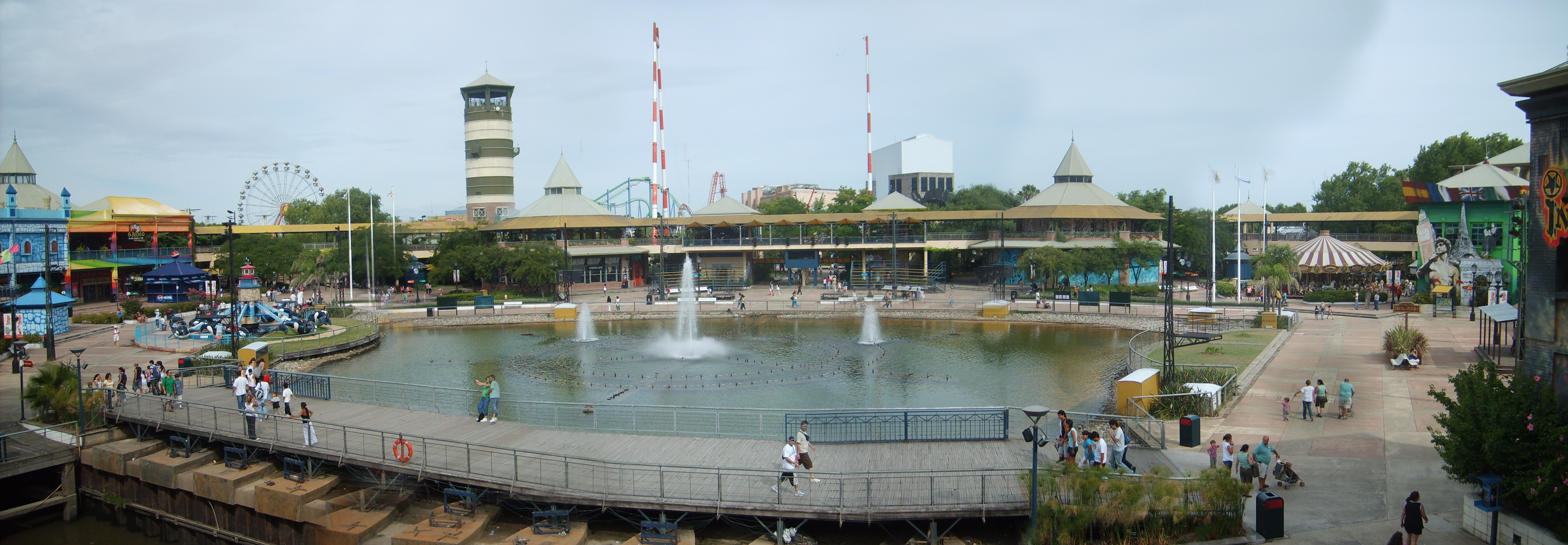
Partial view of the Parque de la Costa

== Overview ==
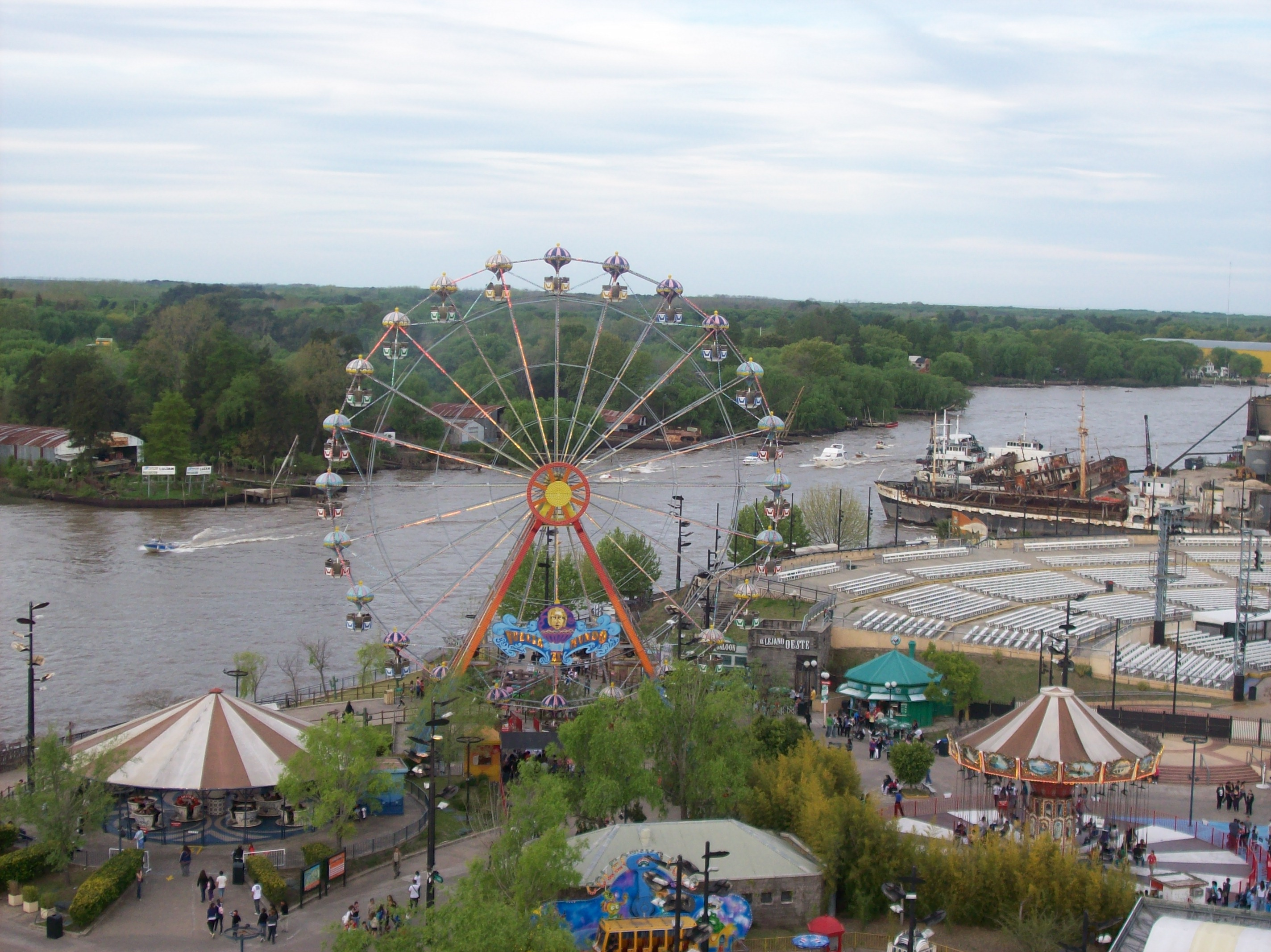
View of the park and the Luján River

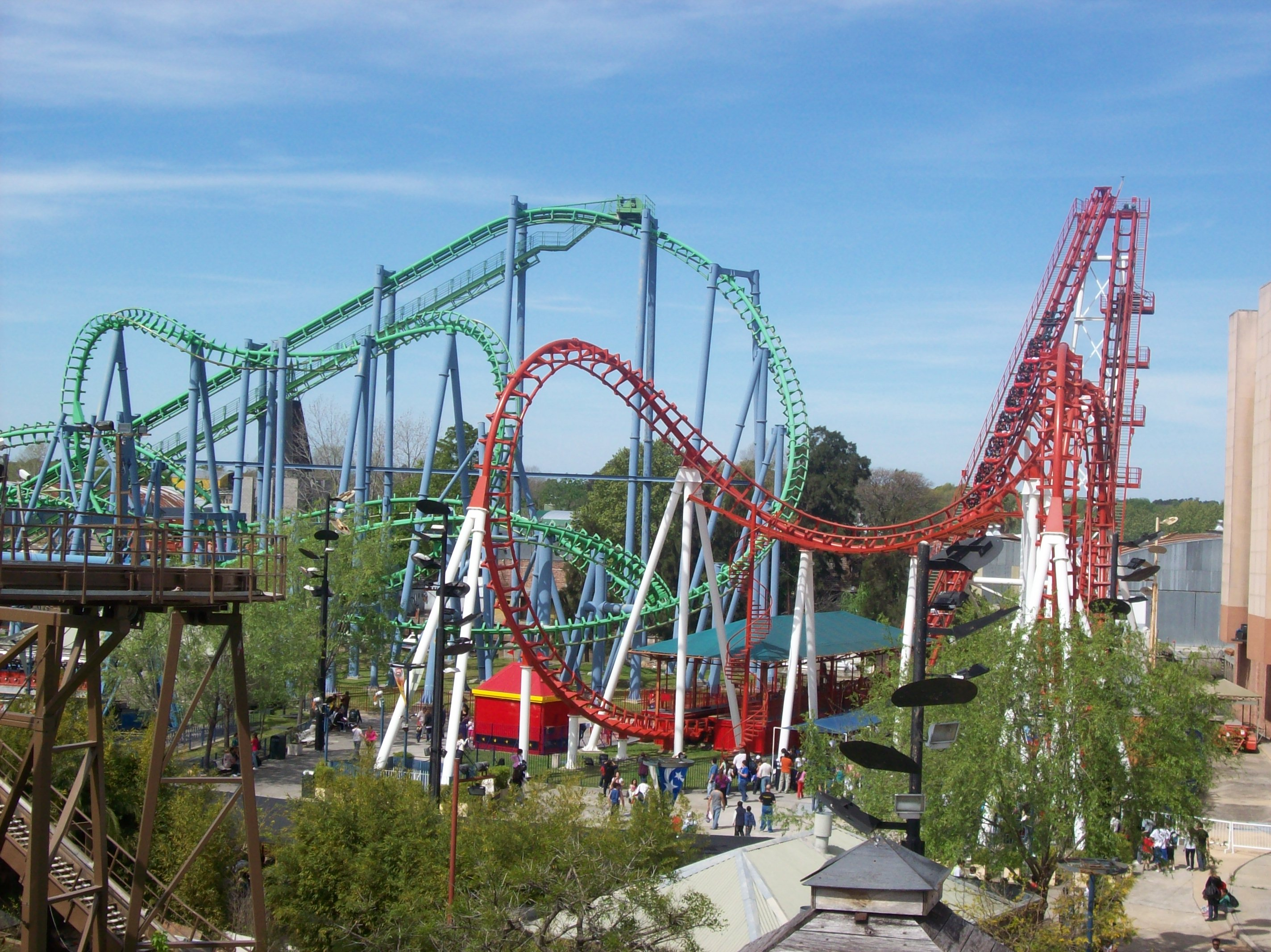
Rollercoasters

The Parque de la Costa has more than 30 attractions, some of them are:

- Saltos del Delta, a flume ride.
- Boomerang (rollercoaster); reaches a height of 37.5 m (123 ft), and speeds of 75 km/h (47 mph).
- El Desafío; the "challenge," an Vekoma SLC Standard Model (rollercoaster) it reaches speeds of 80 km/h (50 mph).
- El Vigia, a family ride set in an artificial lake.
- Torbellino, a Spinning Wild mouse Coaster.
- Vertigo Xtremo, a skycoaster.
- Desorbitados, a top spin ride.
- Colectivo Loco, the "crazy bus."
- Chiquitren, a miniature railway.
- Aconcagua, a climbing wall and tunneled mountain structure.
- Baile de las Tazas, a spinning teacup ride.
- El Faro ("the lighthouse," the 35 m (115 ft) tower affords a panoramic view of the park and delta).
- Laberinto Encantado, a maze.
- Tour de las Naciones, an educational attraction.
- El Infierno, a terror tunnel ride.
- Laser-Shots
- Fuente de Aguas Danzantes, a musical fountain.
- Barco Pirata, pirate ship attraction.
- Comarca de los Sueños; games for smaller children
- "Show de aguas danzantes"
- Karting Monza
- Bumper cars
- Paddleboat rides (Botes en el Nilo, Botes del Pantano)
- Catamaran rides along the delta.

The park also maintains Puerto de Comidas (a food court), as well as a bar, Winners Pub, and two restaurants: Wunderbar and Come Prima; the adjacent, 22,000 m^{2} (240,000 ft^{2}) Trilenium Casino is another SCP development.
