= Deborah Henson-Conant =

American harpist and composer (born 1953)

- Born: November 11, 1953 (age 71); Stockton, California
- Genres: Jazz, blues
- Occupation: Musician
- Instrument(s): Harp, electric harp, voice
- Years active: 1985–present
- Website: Official website

Deborah Henson-Conant (born November 11, 1953, in Stockton, California) is an American harpist and composer. Nicknamed "the Hip Harpist", she is known for her flamboyant stage presence and her innovation with electric harps.

== Career ==
Deborah Henson-Conant describes her music as "cross-genre: jazz-pop-comedy-folk-blues-flamenco-celtic". Deborah performs one-person shows in theaters, concert halls and festivals; and she does original music and theatre shows with symphony orchestras. Her performances mix music with theatrical and story elements. She orchestrates all her own music when she plays with symphony and often engages symphonic musicians in unexpected ways. She states that her career objectives include a desire to reevaluate misconceptions and underestimations of the harp instrument, of the stage medium, and of the self.

The soundtrack of her 2006 DVD Invention & Alchemy, received a Grammy nomination, and the video version began broadcast on American public television in 2007. Her performance series Inviting Invention (2006) presents a series of "performance explorations" that includes both musical and non-musical guests collaborating onstage with Henson-Conant.

In 2012, she joined Steve Vai's band for his 2012 tour and album, The Story of Light. In October 2013, Henson-Conant performed and represented the United States at the 7th annual World Harp Festival, in Asunción, Paraguay.

As you know, a lot of my music is compositional, and there's a lot of arpeggiated guitar parts. They work really well on the harp, especially since it's an electric harp and you can process it. Deborah does a really great job with that, adding those textures. ... I've studied it very precisely. I can't play it, but I understand it. What Deborah has is a little different because she has a strap-on harp with a particular range. ... There's a new kind of challenge.

— Steve Vai

== Discography ==
=== Albums ===
- The Story of Light (2012)
- Invention and Alchemy (2006)
- Artists Proof Ltd Edition Version 2.1 (2004)
- The Frog Princess (2000)
- Live Wires (with Livingston Taylor) (2000)
- The Celtic Album (1998)
- Altered Ego (1998)
- Just for You (1995)
- The Gift (1995)
- 'Round the Corner (1993)
- Naked Music (1994)
- Budapest (1992)
- Talking Hands (1991)
- Caught in the Act (1990)
- On the Rise (1989)
- Songs My Mother Sang (1985)

=== Compilation appearances ===
- New Age Music & New Sounds Vol. 67 - "Liberty"

== Videography ==
- Invention and Alchemy (2006)

== Reception ==
The soundtrack of her 2006 DVD Invention & Alchemy, received a Grammy nomination. The Daily News Online said that she has a "harp show like none other", featuring her "big, brassy voice".

== Instruments ==
Henson-Conant plays electric harps of various kinds, but primarily plays Camac Harps. The Camac DHC Light Blue electric harp was named after her.

- Small Rubarth "R-Harp" (a lap harp)
- Lyon & Healy Style 2000 Electroacoustic
- Camac Electro-acoustic Big Blue
- Camac Baby Blue
- Lyon & Healy Silhouette
