= Tren de la Costa =

Light rail line in Buenos Aires, Argentina

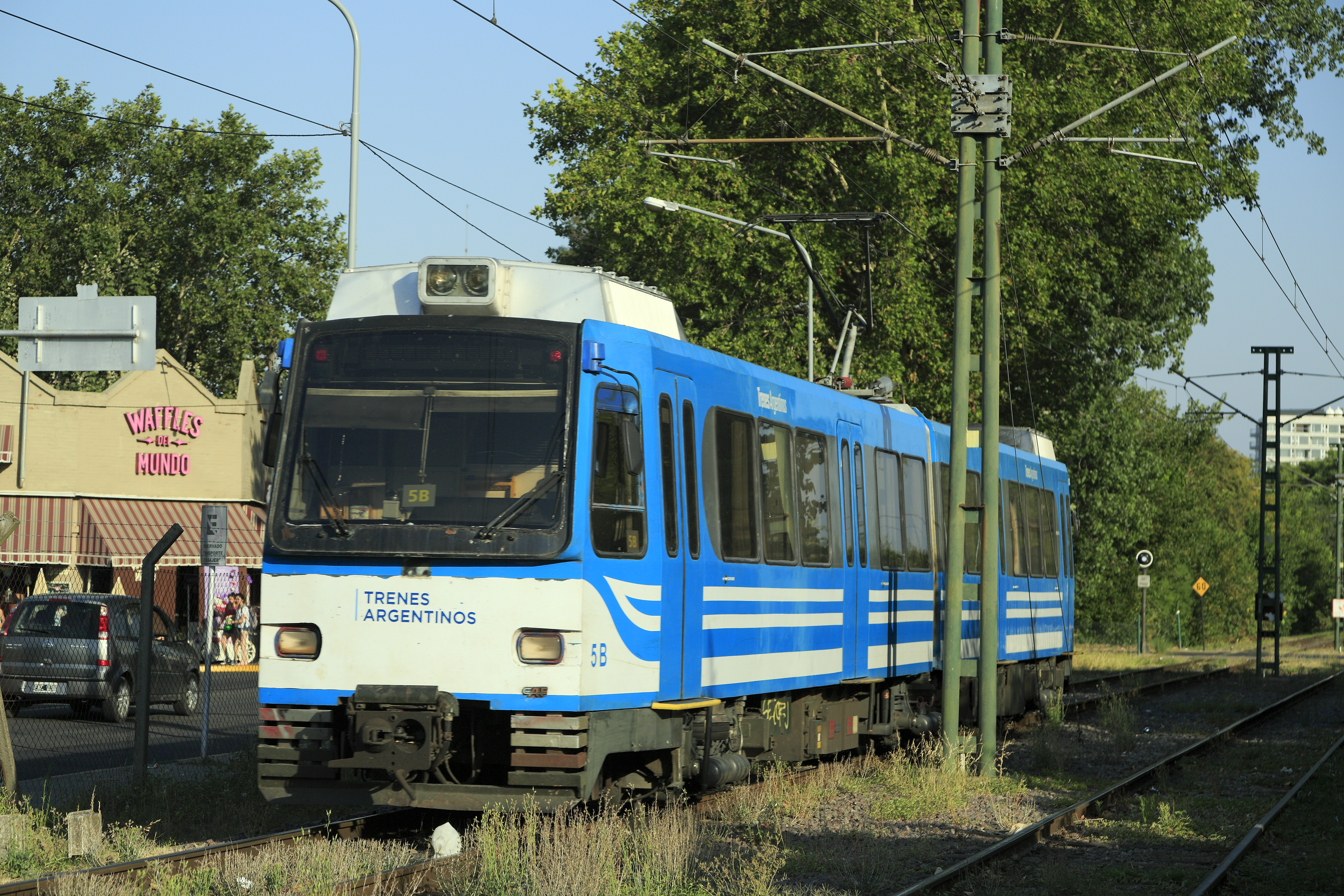
- One of the CAF-built light rail cars that serve the line

Overview
- Service type: Light rail
- Status: Active
- Locale: Greater Buenos Aires
- Predecessor: Mitre Railway
- First service: 1995; 31 years ago
- Current operators: Trenes Argentinos (2013–present)
- Former operators: Sociedad Comercial del Plata (1995–2013)
- Ridership: 300,246 (2021)
- Website: Tren de la Costa

Route
- Termini: Maipú; Delta
- Stops: 11
- Distance travelled: 15.5 km (9.6 mi)
- Average journey time: 30'
- Service frequency: 30'

Technical
- Track gauge: 1,435 mm (4 ft 8 1/2 in) standard gauge
- Operating speed: 30 km/h (19 mph)
- Track owner: Government of Argentina
Route map
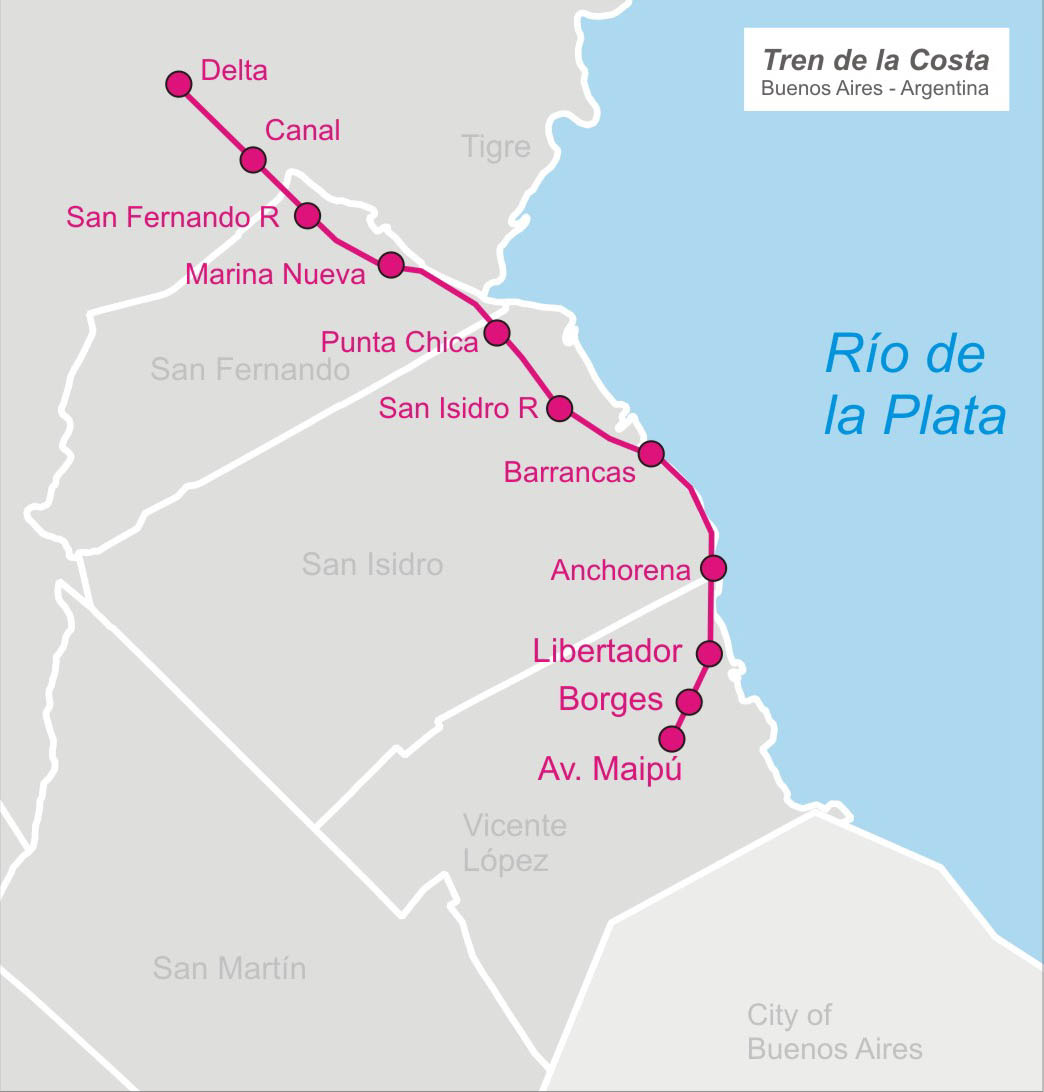

Tren de la Costa (in English: "Train of the Coast") is a suburban 15.5 km (9.6 mi), 11-station light rail line in Greater Buenos Aires, between Maipú Avenue station in the northern suburb of Olivos and Delta station in Tigre, on the Río de la Plata. The line connects with the Mitre line at Maipú station, via a footbridge across Avenida Maipú, for direct access to Retiro terminus in central Buenos Aires.

Tren de la Costa is served by nine two-car trains sets. Each train has a capacity of 200 passengers and travels at an average speed of 35 km/h. The journey time is 30 minutes, with a frequency of 30 minutes. The service is currently operated by State-owned Trenes Argentinos Operaciones.

== History ==
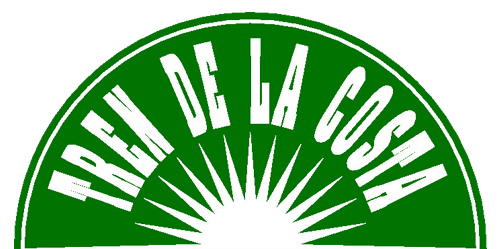
Former logo, from when the line was operated by SCP (1995-2013)

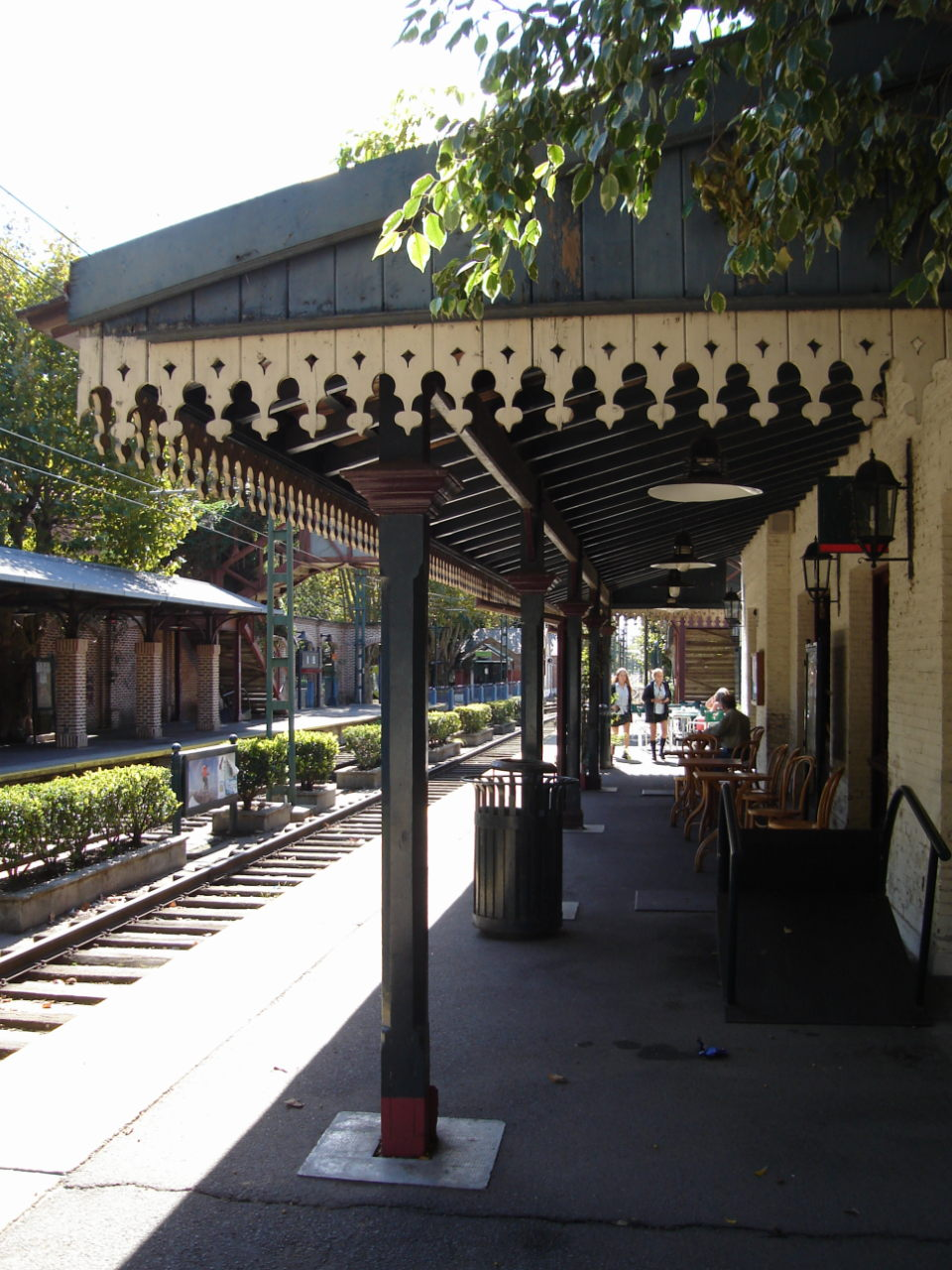
Borges station, in the residential area of Olivos

The original line was constructed between 1891 and 1896 as part of the Buenos Aires and Rosario Railway (BA&R) connecting Coghlan junction in the Buenos Aires neighbourhood of Belgrano with the port of Tigre and was known as the Tren del Bajo. Tracks ran following the course of the river, serving as an alternative route to Tigre, which was already served by the Buenos Aires Northern Railway.

The line was later absorbed by the Central Argentine Railway when this company took over the (BA&R) in 1908. The line was electrified in 1931 and after nationalisation in 1948, it became part of General Mitre Railway. In 1961 the Government of Argentina led by President Arturo Frondizi closed the B. Mitre-Delta branch due to the low number of passengers carried and high maintenance costs.

In 1990 plans were formulated for the reopening of the line and with the railways being privatised in 1992, the Tren de la Costa company (part of Sociedad Comercial del Plata, controlled by local businessman Santiago Soldati) was formed to take over the concession for the service.

The track was converted from 5 ft 6 in (1,676 mm) broad gauge to 1,435 mm (4 ft 8 1/2 in) standard gauge, and re-electrified utilising an overhead system rather than the former third rail in 1994. Public services and related commercial operations began in April 1995, and the maiden ride was shared by Soldati, company and government officials, and President Carlos Menem.

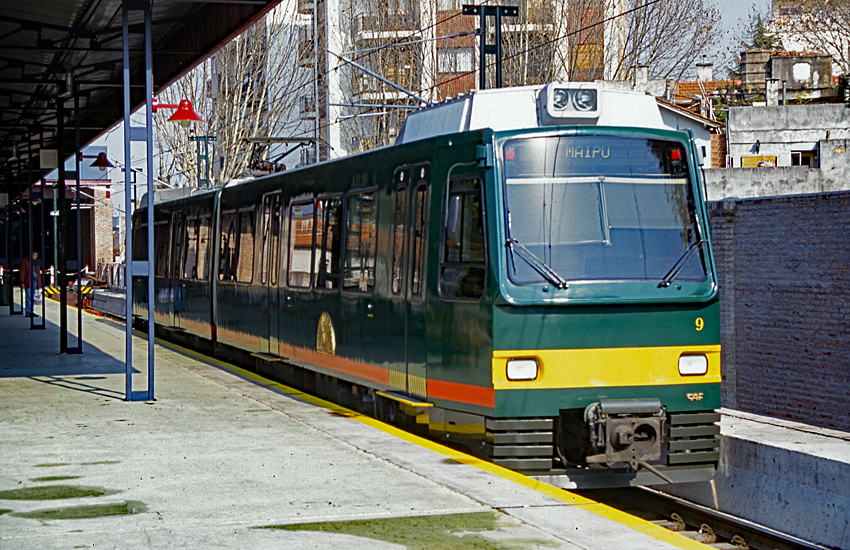
CAF Unit 9 at Maipú in original livery

The company remodelled the eight stations of the branch and built three new stations, most of them with the concept of shopping mall centres, with San Isidro being the most representative of this. A new terminus, named "Maipú" was built just in front of former Bartolomé Mitre terminus. Both stations were connected through a pedestrian bridge over Maipú Avenue. Unlike the Retiro-B. Mitre branch, the new Maipú-Delta service was a light rail system, using articulated cars acquired from Spanish company Construcciones y Auxiliar de Ferrocarriles (CAF).

During the first years of service, the branch carried an average of 100,000 passengers (on weekends) due to it having been conceived as a tourist train, with Maipú, Libertador and San Isidro as its main commercial centres. Beside the Delta terminus, a new amusement park, Parque de la Costa was built, advertised as the largest in South America. Two years later, the Trillenium Casino opened beside the park and Delta station. These projects, as well as the shopping malls, were designed to be part of the "de la Costa" franchise.

Passenger numbers dropped significantly over the years following the opening of the line in 1995. Around 100,000 journeys were made each weekend initially; but, by 2005 there were just 150,000 a month, a third of which were foreign tourists. While the economy later improved, this did not reverse the falloff in ridership, which declined to around 70,000 a month by 2010. This affected both the railway and the amusement park. The SCP applied to the national government for a grant, but this was denied as the line was categorised as a tourist train, rather than one for public passenger transport. Most shops along the line closed. The Government of Argentina revoked the concession to SCP, taking over the Tren de la Costa through its subsidiary SOFSE. This decision was published in the Argentine Official Bulletin on 3 Jun 2013.

== Concept ==
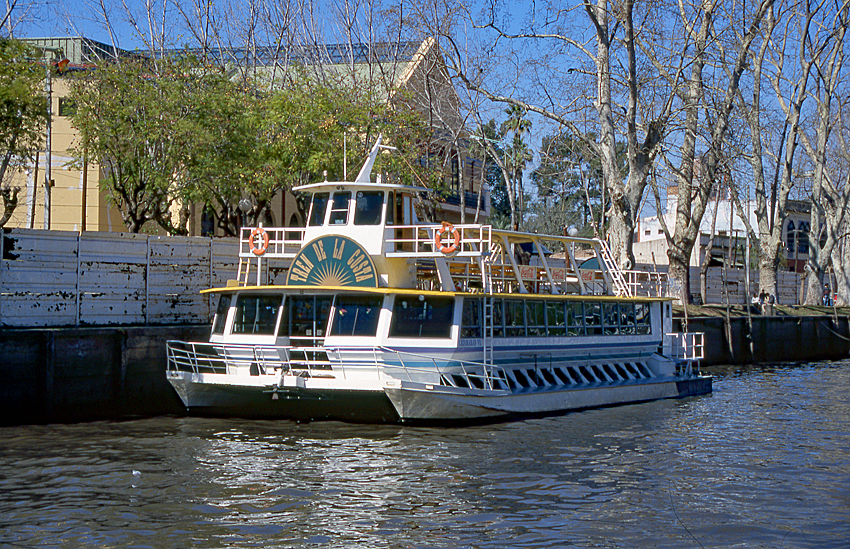
Catamaran VII operated by the Tren de la Costa franchise

The line and its stations were conceived to offer various forms of entertainment and enjoyment for both adults and children, being used by both tourists and commuters. Each station, seven of which are original stations refurbished, has history and art displays, and substantial shopping areas were built at Maipú, Libertador and San Isidro. Borges Station, by the Olivos marina, was planned as 'the station of the arts' with an art café with open-air sculptures. Located nearby is the Juan Carlos Altavista Cinema (former "Cine York"), one of the oldest still operating in the world. Anchorena station was nicknamed The Tango station due to its cultural centre, and Barrancas station hosts an antiques fair.

The route between Libertador and San Isidro was adapted for use by walkers, joggers and cyclists. Delta station serves the Parque de la Costa, an amusement park, as well as Tigre's other important tourist attractions including the Trillenium Casino, a crafts fair, riverside restaurants and boat trips.

== Stations ==
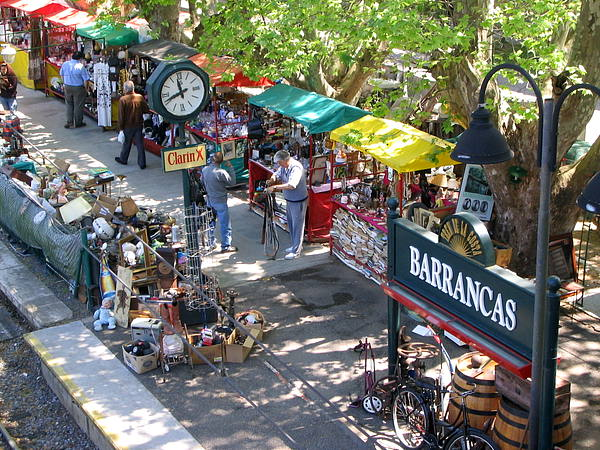
Barrancas station, where an antiques fair is held on weekends

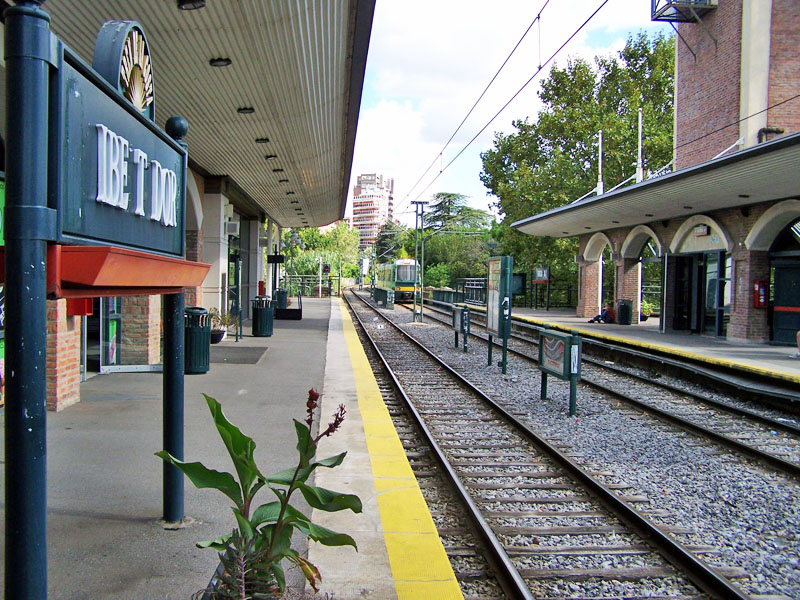
Libertador station

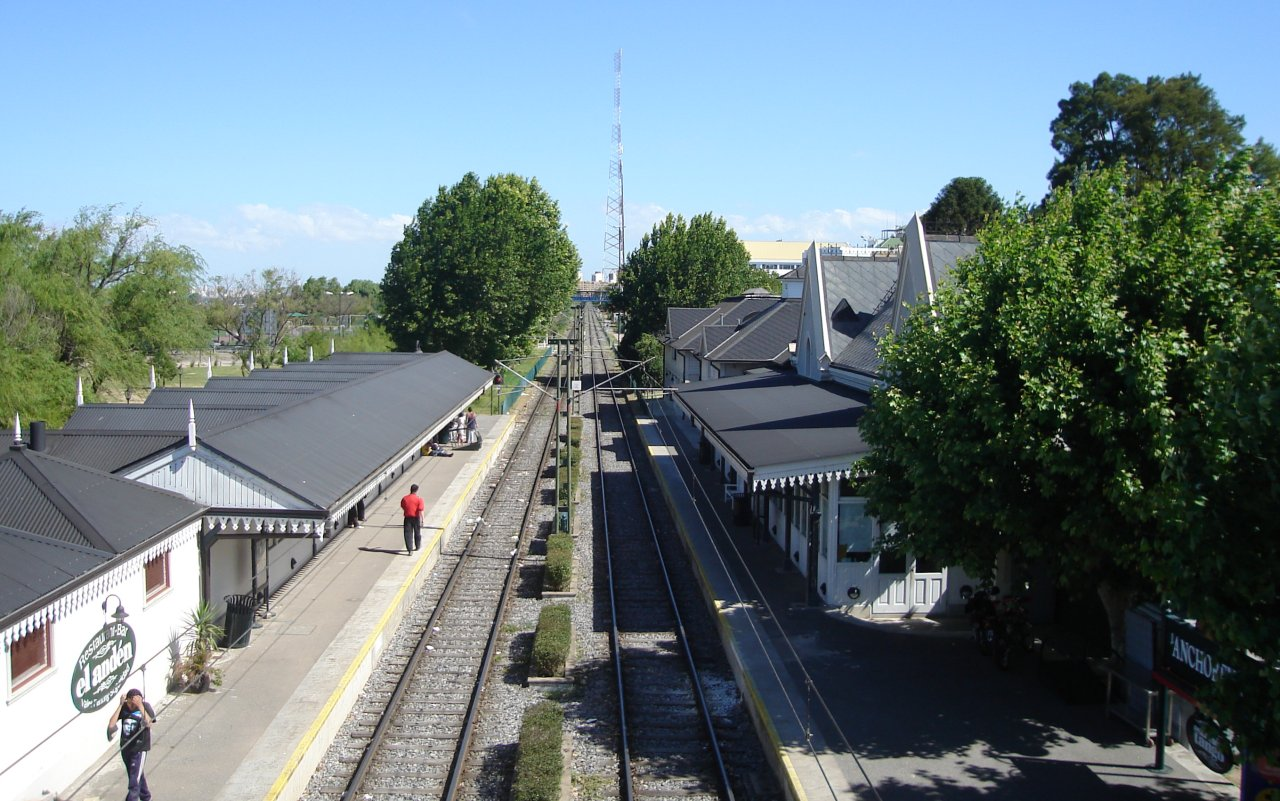
Anchorena building and platforms

Station	Partido	Facilities
Avenida Maipú	Vicente López	Accessible toilets, Parking lot, Coffeehouse, access to Mitre Line
Borges	Vicente López	Accessible toilets, Coffeehouse
Libertador	Vicente López	Accessible toilets, Parking lot, Coffeehouse, Supermarket, Retail
Juan Anchorena	San Isidro	Accessible toilets, Parking lot, Coffeehouse
Las Barrancas	San Isidro	Accessible toilets, Coffeehouse
San Isidro R	San Isidro	Accessible toilets, Parking lot, Coffeehouse, Supermarket, Retail, Cinema
Punta Chica	San Isidro	Accessible toilets,
Marina Nueva	San Fernando	Accessible toilets, Coffeehouse
San Fernando R	San Fernando	Accessible toilets
Canal San Fernando	Tigre	Accessible toilets, Coffeehouse
Delta (Note: The original Tigre R station building was inhabited by intruders when the concession was granted. To avoid delays, it was decided to build a new station some metres to the south until the problem was solved. Nowadays the original station building is operating as a restaurant.)	Tigre	Accessible toilets, Coffeehouse, access to Parque de la Costa, river bus station (Note: The boat station (renamed "Estación Fluvial Domingo F. Sarmiento") is the original Central Argentine Railway's Tigre C station building. When TBA opened a new terminus in 1995, the old building fell into disuse. The Municipality of Tigre restored the building in 2000, currently serving as the river bus station.) and Trilenium Casino
New stations built by concessionary Sociedad Comercial del Plata.

== See also ==
- Trams in Buenos Aires
- Parque de la Costa
- Buenos Aires and Rosario Railway
