= Rubarth =

Rubarth is a surname. Notable people with the surname include:

- Amber Rubarth (born 1982), American singer-songwriter and actress
- Mats Rubarth (born 1977), Swedish musician and former footballer
