= 4 Girls 4 Harps =

Musical ensemble

4 Girls 4 Harps is a quartet of award-winning female harpists formed in 2000. They play Salvi concert harps and modern electric harps. As of June 2012, the members were Keziah Thomas, Angharad Wyn Jones, Harriet Adie and Eleanor Turner.

== Radio ==
The group's music has been broadcast internationally on ABC Classic and in the UK on Classic FM, where their recording was David Mellor's Recommended CD of the week in June 2009, on Rob Cowan's Breakfast Show on BBC Radio 3 in September 2009, and on BBC Radio 2's Melodies for You programme with Alan Titchmarsh in March 2010.

In December 2013, 4 Girls 4 Harps performed live on BBC Radio 3.

In May 2015, the 15th anniversary of its formation, the group again performed live on BBC Radio 3 with the BBC noting, "Their upcoming concert at Temple Church in London features the world premiere of 'Tetra' -a four movement work based on the lives of four influential woman and composed by four female composers, commissioned by the quartet to mark the anniversary". In the same month, they also performed live on BBC Radio Four's Woman's Hour.

In May 2017, Classic FM's Lizzie Davis noted, "4 Girls 4 Harps [have] made a name for themselves with innovative arrangements of well-known works – from Piazzolla to Borodin. Harps don't often get the chance to be centre-stage, but 4 Girls 4 Harps are changing that, with their creative and virtuosic arrangements of well-known works for harp quartet".

== Television ==
4 Girls 4 Harps have also featured in several TV programmes including S4C's Nosen Lawen (March 2010) and Wedi 7 (May 2009). The group were also showcased in an article in Classical Music magazine (August 2009) about upcoming new groups and in Muso magazine (Oct/Nov 2009 issue).

== Critical reception ==
Reviews of 4 Girls 4 Harps' concerts include:

"...A varied and innovative repertoire and four engaging personalities: A star." - N2 Arts and Entertainment, May 2010

"... no gimmicks, no stunts, no fancy costumes beyond elegant evening wear – just engaging chat and rather lovely music." - Lichfield Gazette, July 2011

"enriched their audience with floods of melody in an eclectic yet well proportioned selection of musical delights." - South Wales Evening Post, July 2012
