= Tigre, Buenos Aires =

City in Buenos Aires Province, Argentina

Tigre
- City
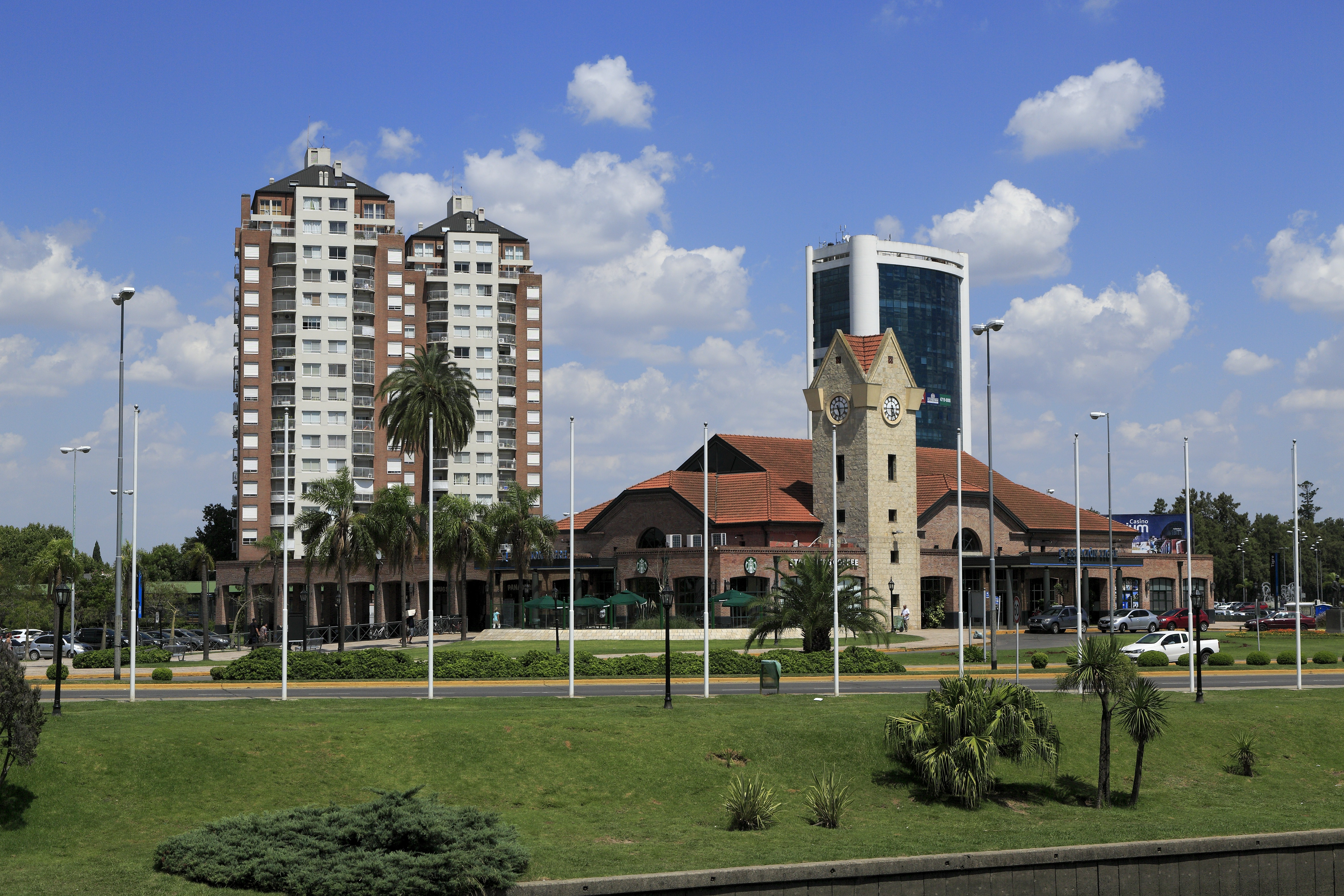
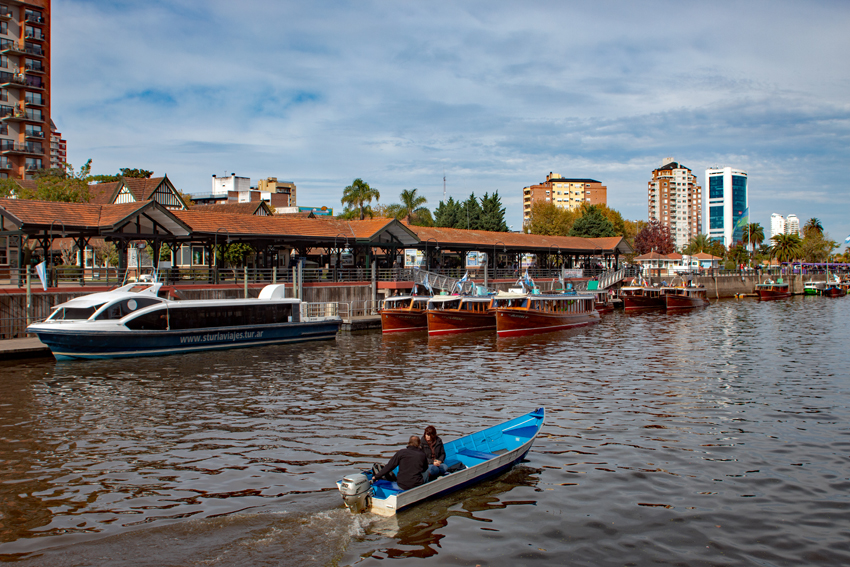
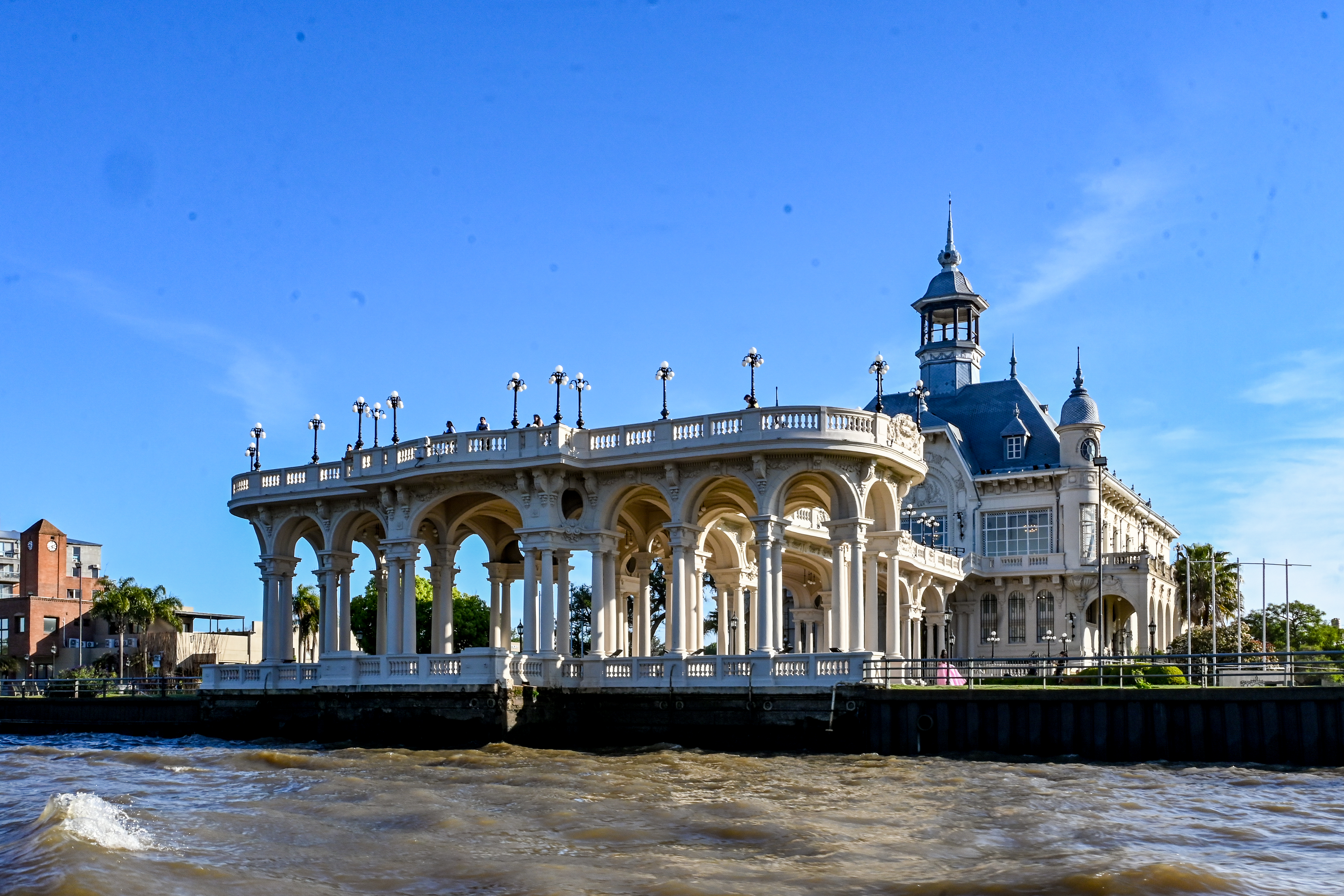
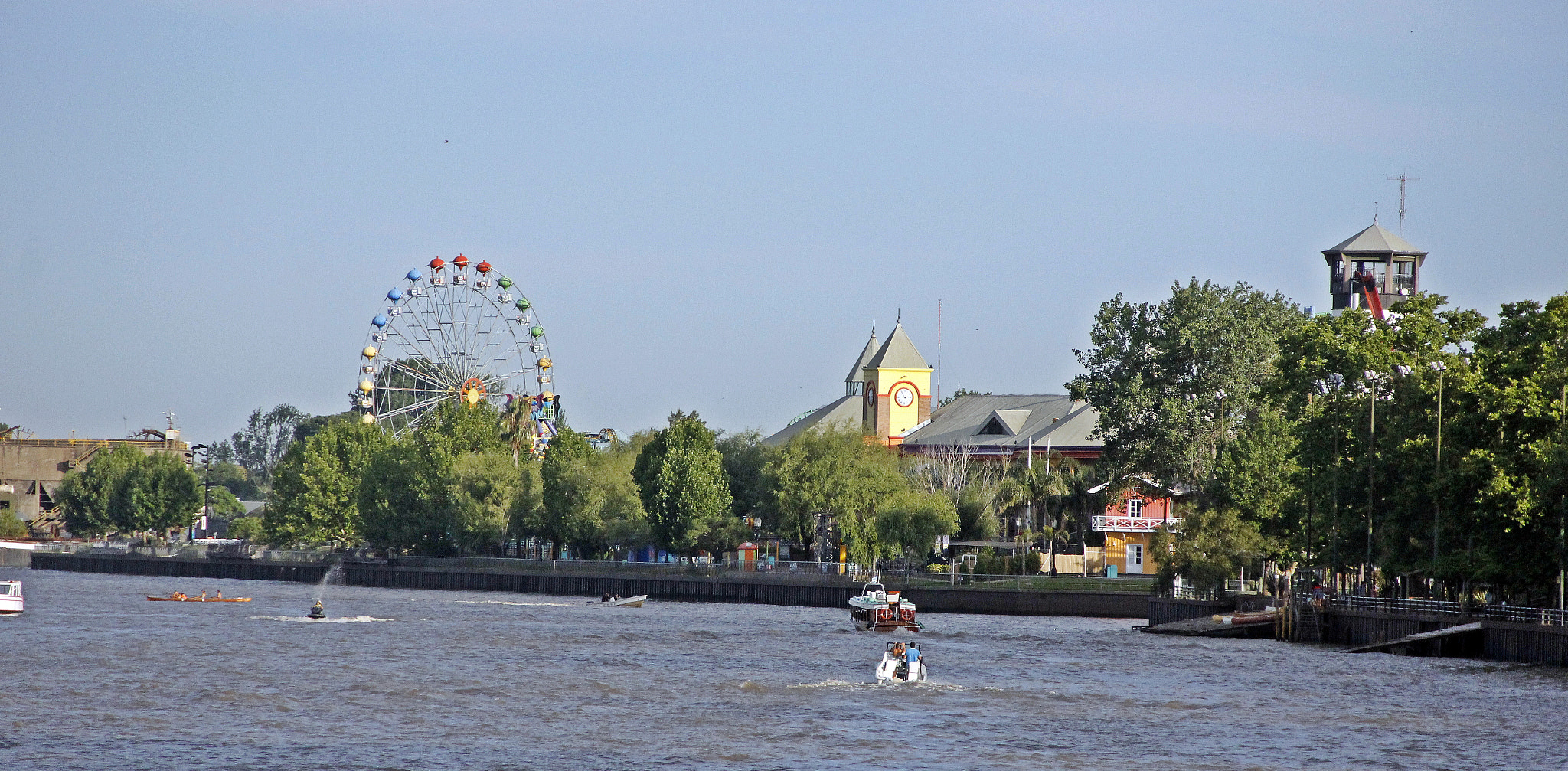
- Tigre Station Tigre River docks Tigre Art Museum Mayor Ricardo Ubieto La Marina Rowing Club Coast Park next to the Luján River

- Location in Greater Buenos Aires
- Coordinates: 34°25′S 58°35′W
- Country: Argentina
- Province: Buenos Aires
- Partido: Tigre
- Elevation: 2 m (6.6 ft)

Population (2010 census)
  - Total: 31,106
- CPA Base: B 1648
- Area code: +54 11

Tigre (Spanish pronunciation: [ˈtiɣɾe], Tiger) is a city in the Buenos Aires Province, Argentina, situated in the north of Greater Buenos Aires, 28 km (17 mi) north of Buenos Aires city. Tigre lies on the Paraná Delta and is a tourist and weekend destination, reachable by bus and train services, including the scenic Tren de la Costa. It is the main city and administrative centre of the Tigre Partido.

== History ==
The area's name derives from the "tigers" or jaguars that were hunted there, on occasions, in its early years. The area was first settled by Europeans who came to farm the land. The city sits on an island created by several small streams and rivers and was founded in 1820, after floods had destroyed other settlements in the area, then known as the Partido de las Conchas. The port developed to serve the delta and to bring fruit and wood from the delta and ports upstream on the Paraná river. Tigre is still an important timber processing port.

== Transportation ==
=== Road ===
Tigre is connected to the capital by a spur, the Ramal Tigre, off the main Route 9 highway.

=== Rail ===
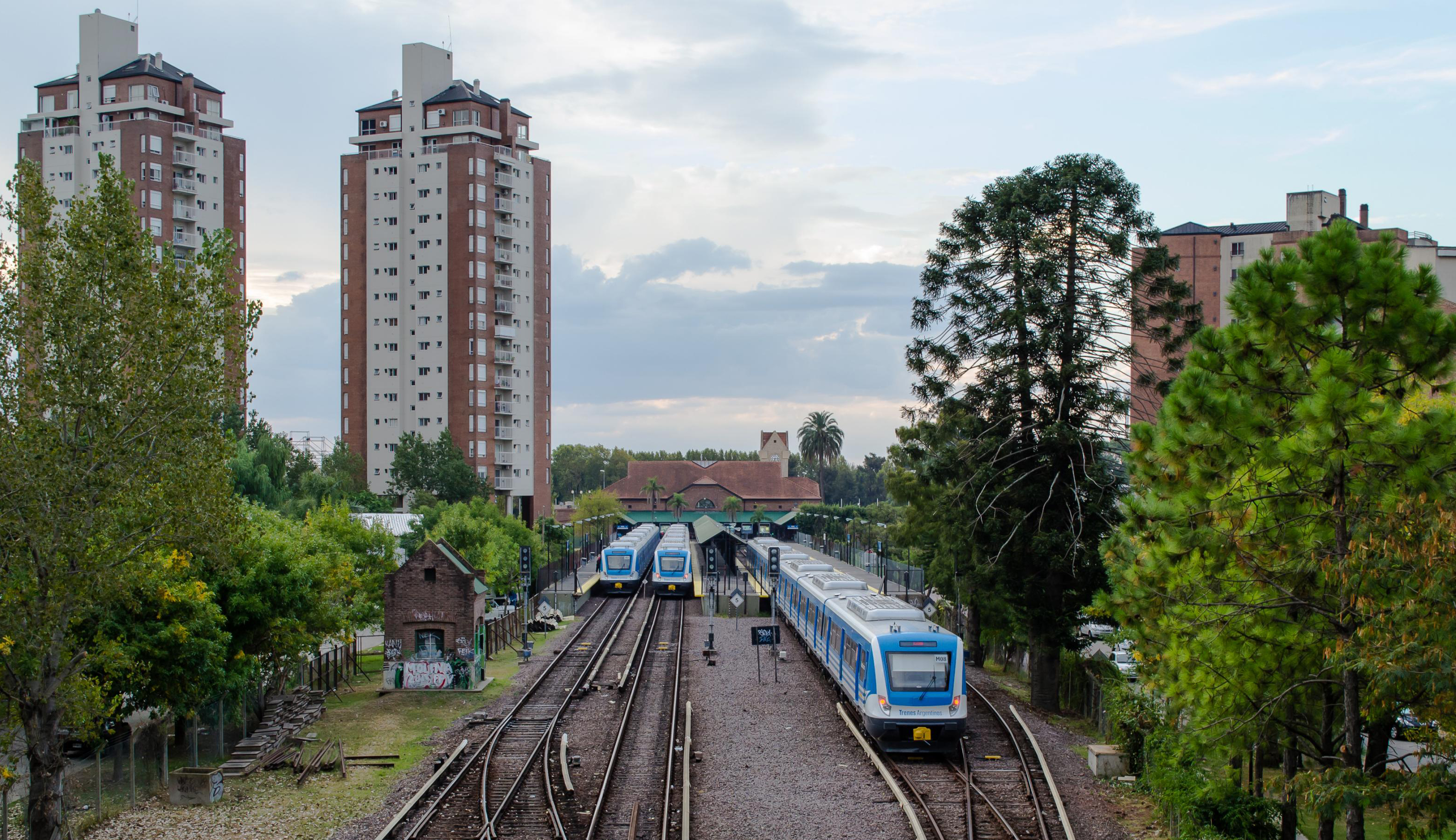
Mitre Line CSR Electric Multiple Units at Tigre train station.

The city of Tigre is served by two railway lines, the Mitre Line and the Tren de la Costa, both terminate within walking distance of the city centre.

- Mitre Line

Retiro – Tigre (direct service)

Mitre Line trains depart from Buenos Aires Retiro Station to Tigre Station every 10 – 30 minutes.

- Mitre Line / Tren de La Costa

Retiro – Olivos – Delta

Trains run from Retiro to Bartolomé Mitre station in Olivos, with a footbridge connection to Maipú station of the Tren de la Costa

=== River ===
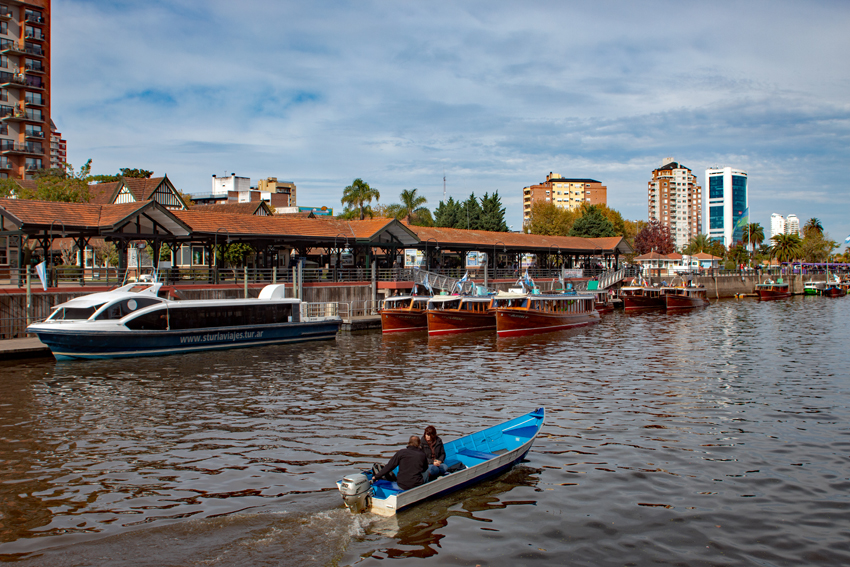
Tigre river bus station with commuter launches

Inter-island public transport in the delta is catered for by traditional-styled mahogany commuter launches.

== Tourism ==
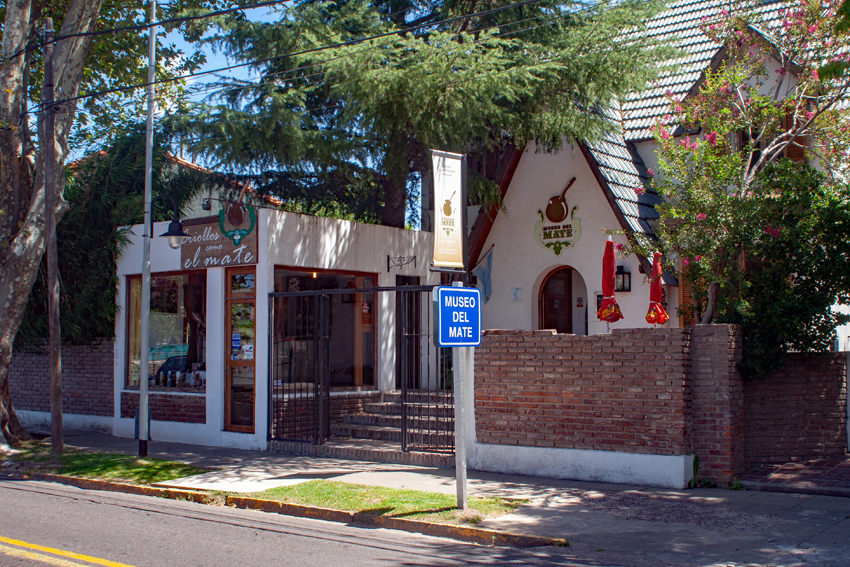
Museo del Mate

Tigre is a tourist and weekend destination, reached by bus and train services, including the Tren de la Costa.

The former “Puerto de Frutos”, or fruit market, is now a crafts fair located by the riverside. Attractions include antiques shops, riverside restaurants and bars, the casino, the Parque de la Costa, an amusement park, and its natural environment which make Tigre a tourist destination throughout the year. There are small hotels and upscale lodges, restaurants, teahouses and picnic sites.

English-style rowing clubs, a number of marinas, dwellings and mansions from the “Belle Époque”, such as the Tigre Club, are in the area. The Tigre Club building is now the Museo de Arte Tigre, housing an extensive collection of Argentine art. The Argentine Naval Museum, nearby, features items from Argentine naval history with an emphasis on the Guerra de las Malvinas. It also has the log-book from HMS Beagle. There is also a museum dedicated to mate.

Tigre is the starting point for a visit to the Paraná Delta. A number of companies offer sightseeing trips through its inter-connecting rivers and streams, some extending as far as Martín García Island.

== Gallery ==
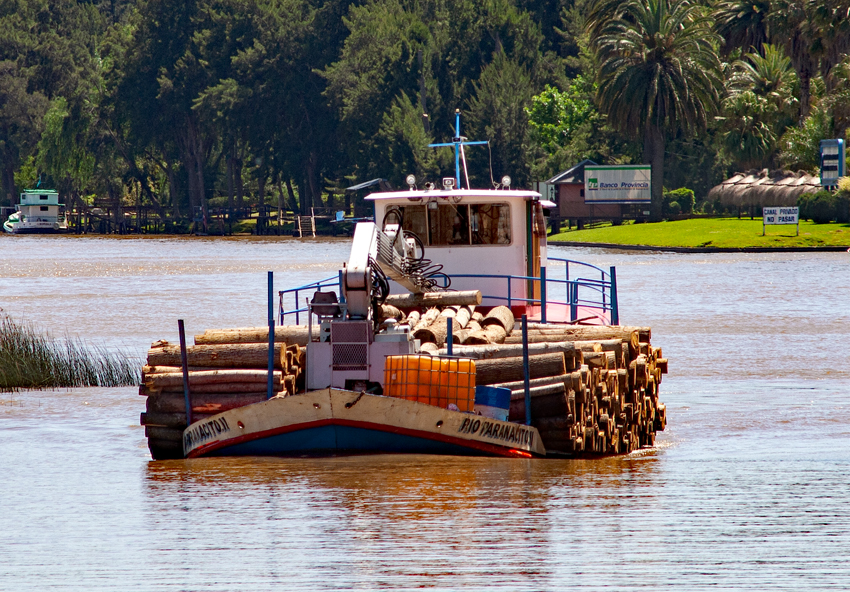
Log boat, Rio Paranacito II approaching Tigre

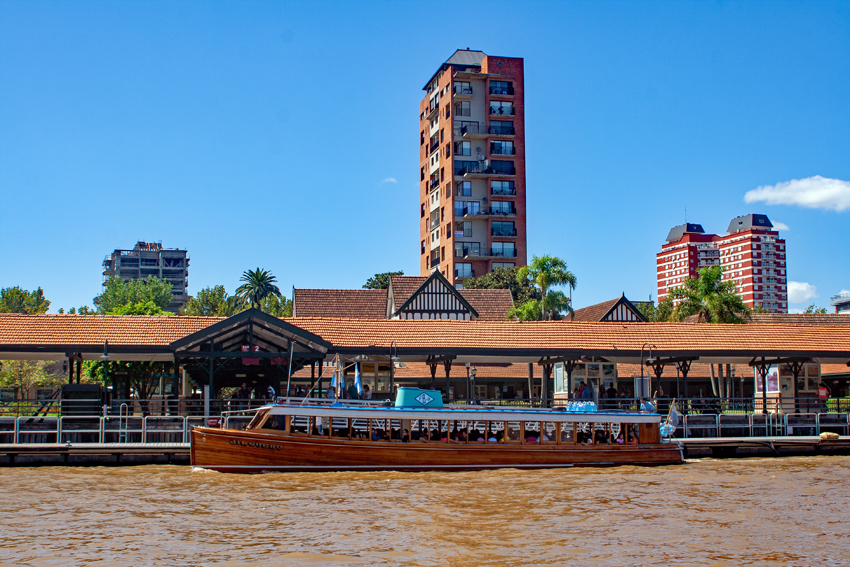
River bus Jilguero at the boat station

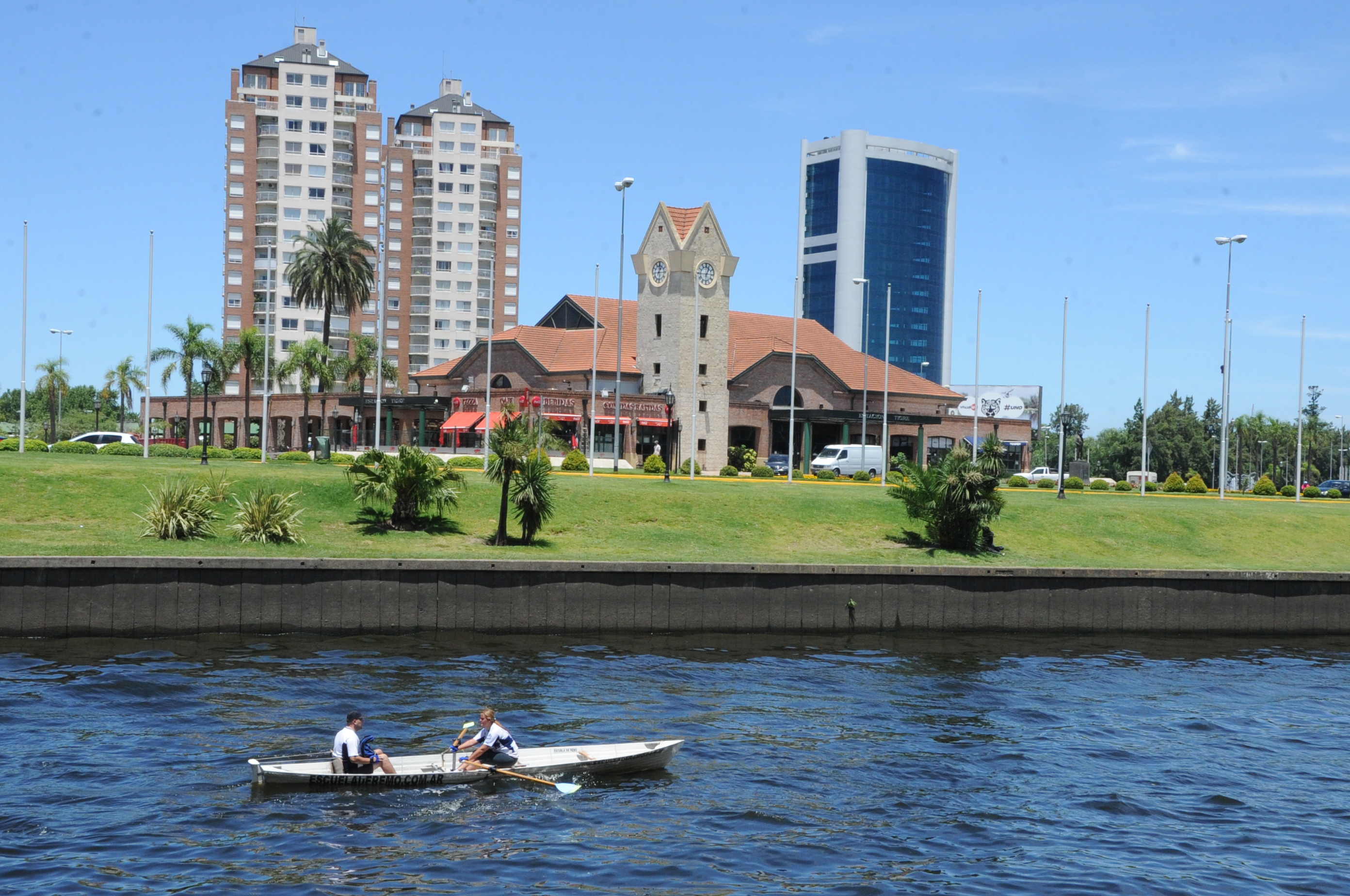
Mitre Railway Tigre Station

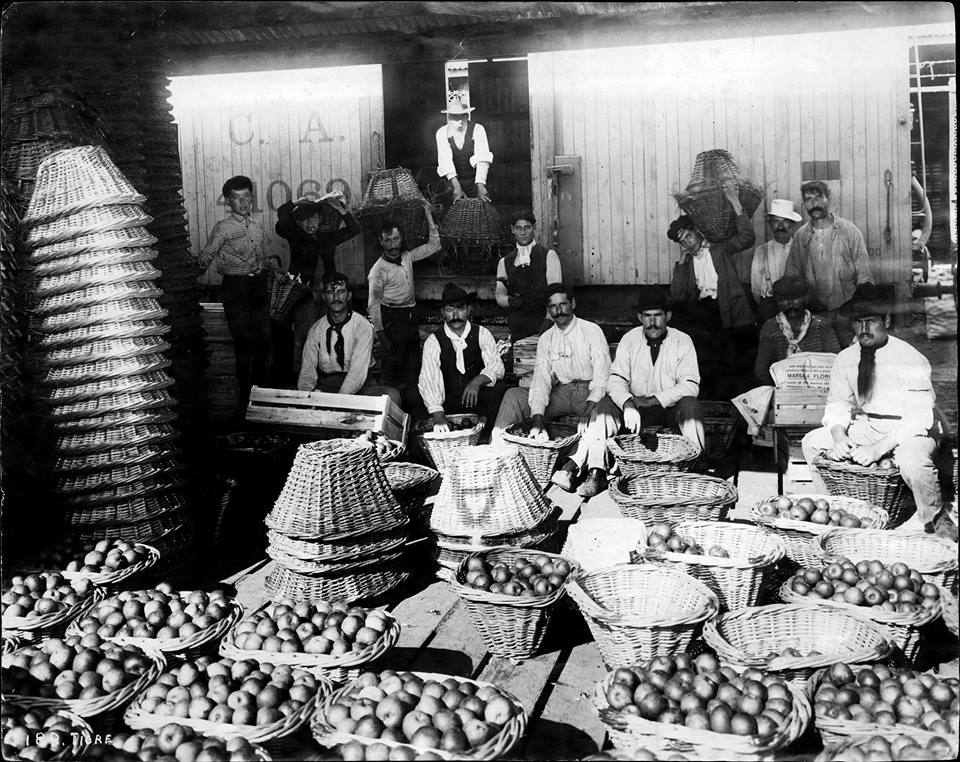
The Fruit Market in 1902

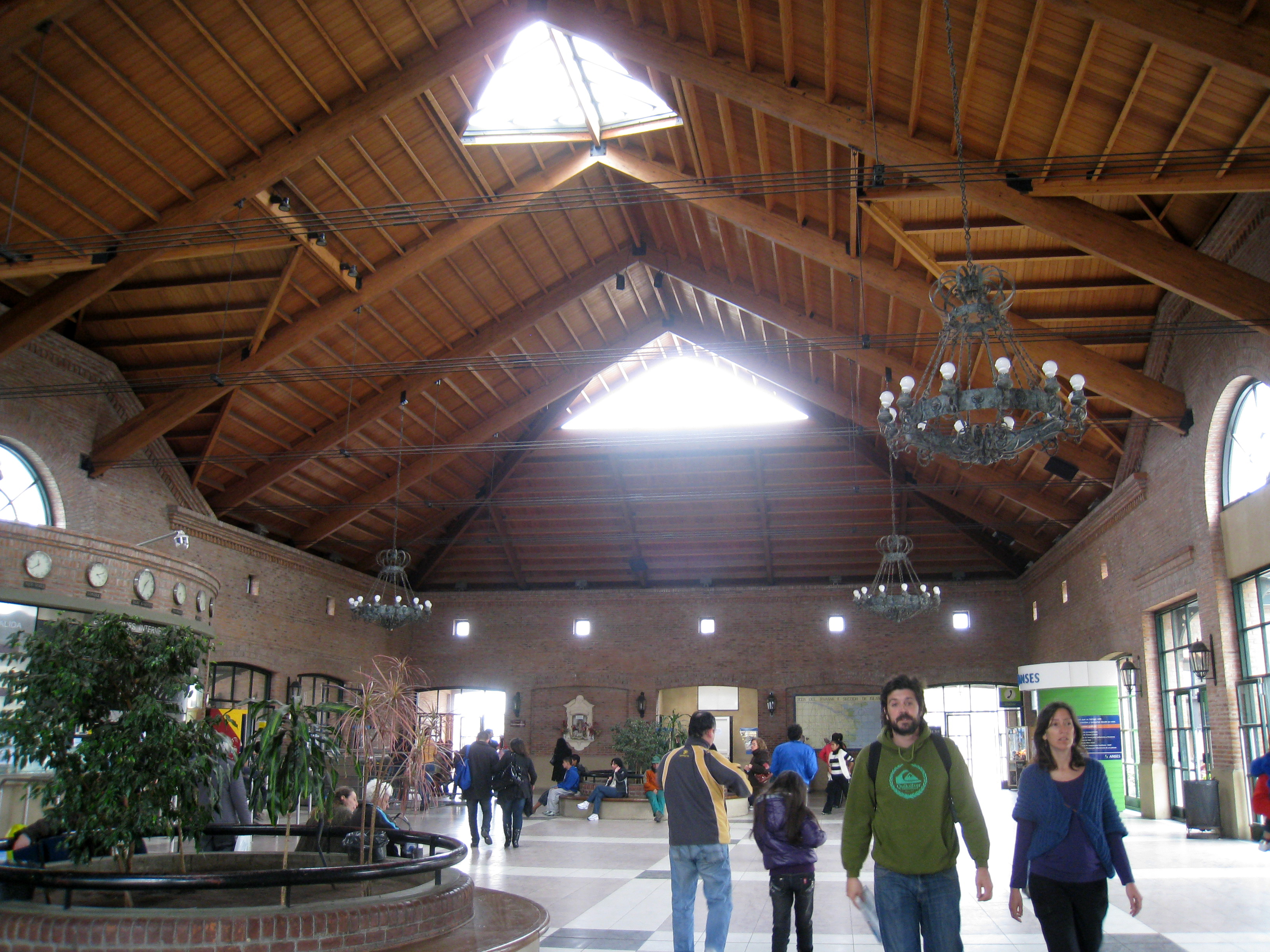
Tigre Station, inside

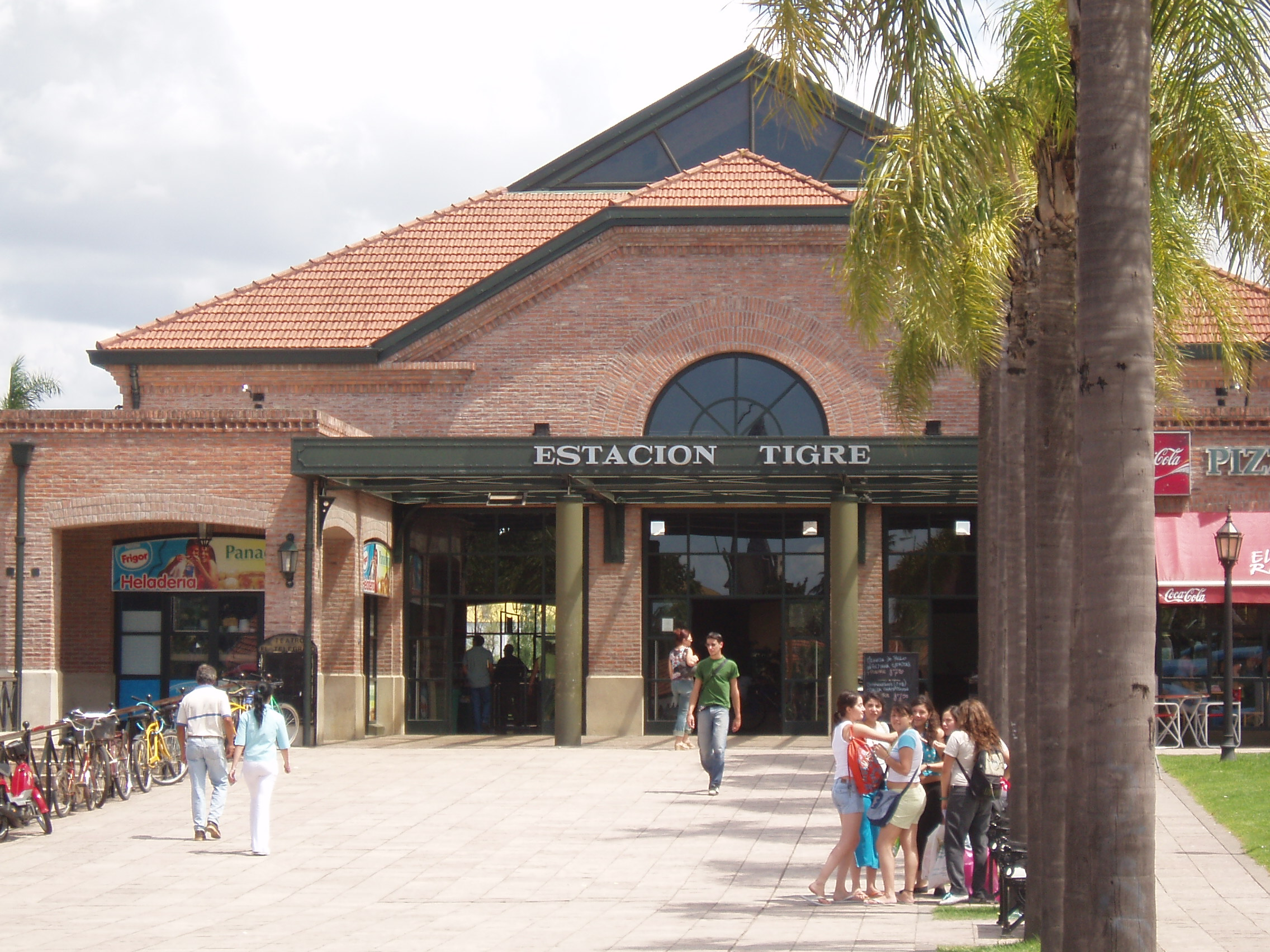
Tigre Station, outside

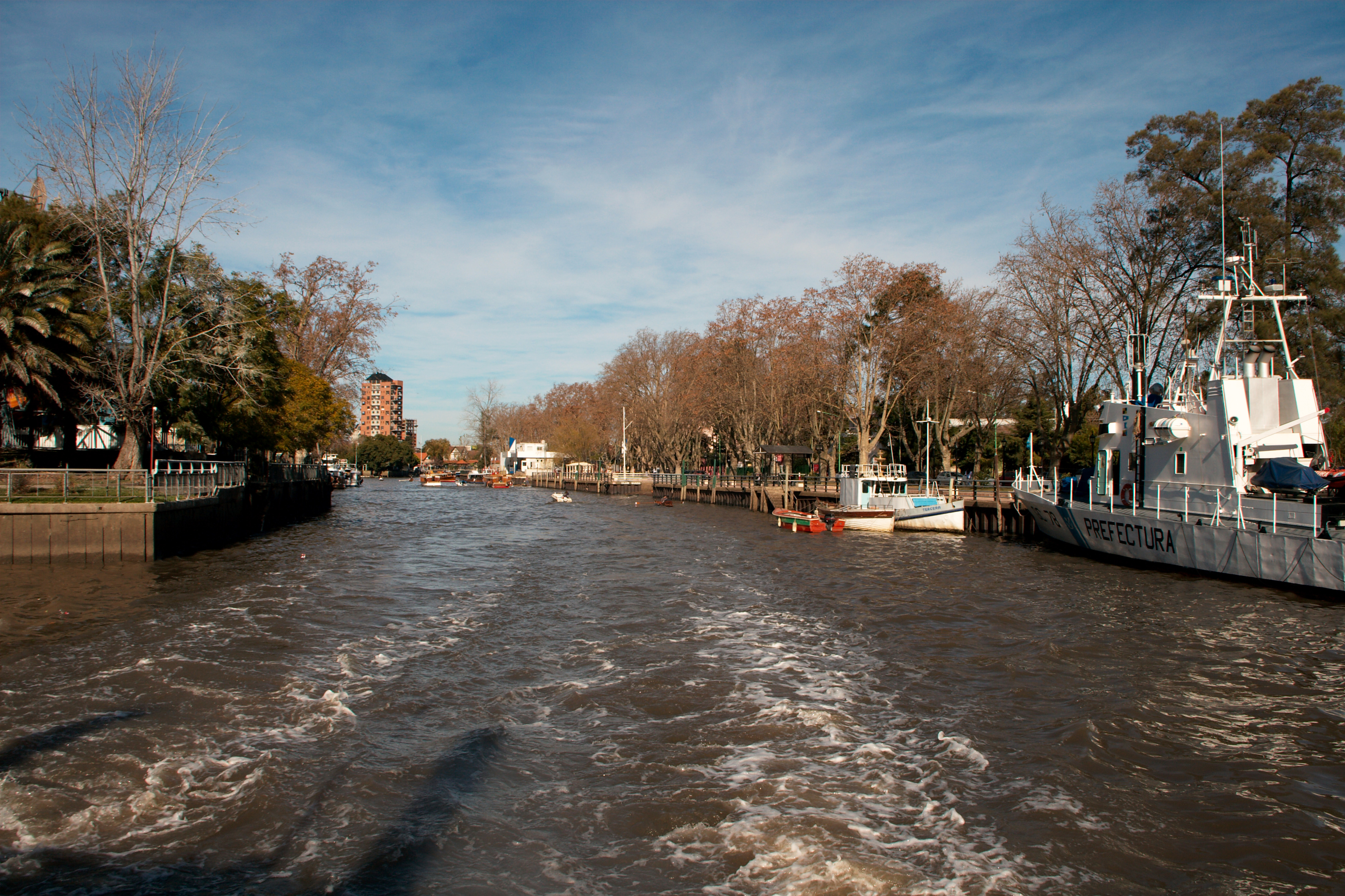
Tigre River

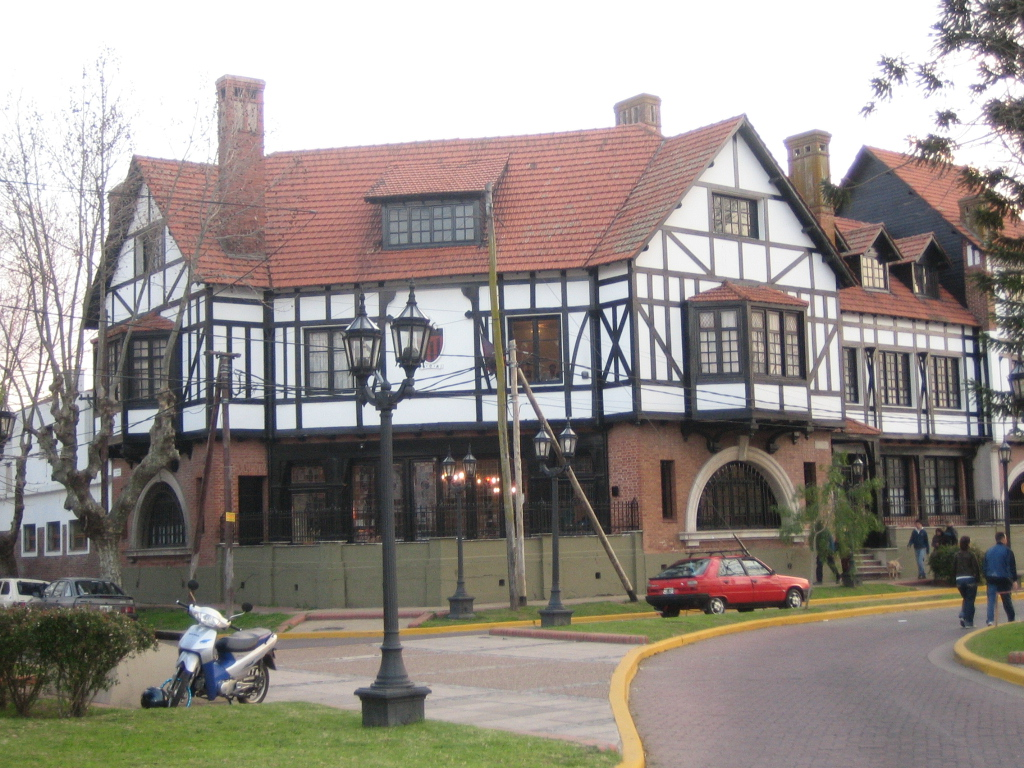
Argentine Rowing Club

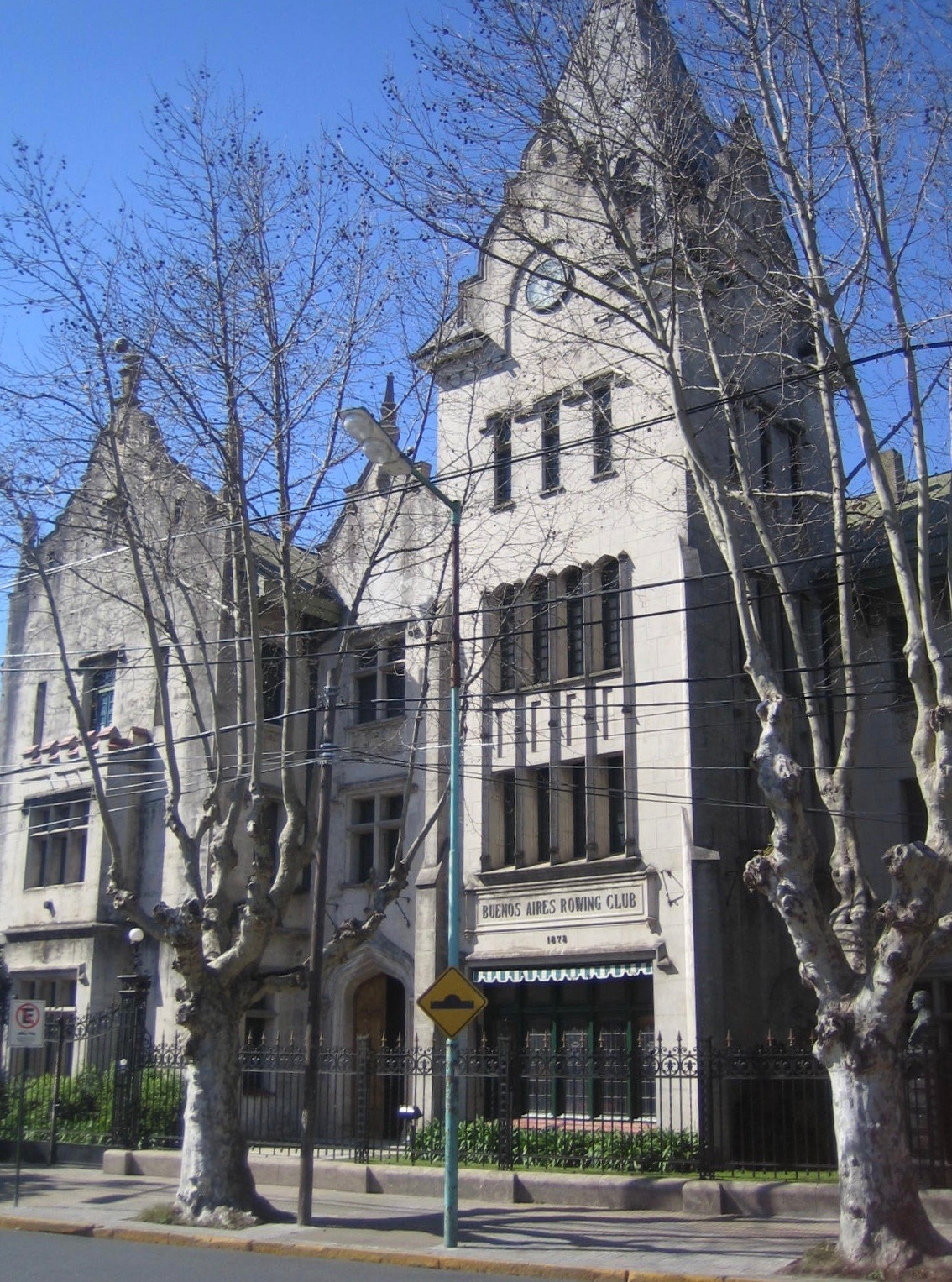
Buenos Aires Rowing Club

La Marina Rowing Club

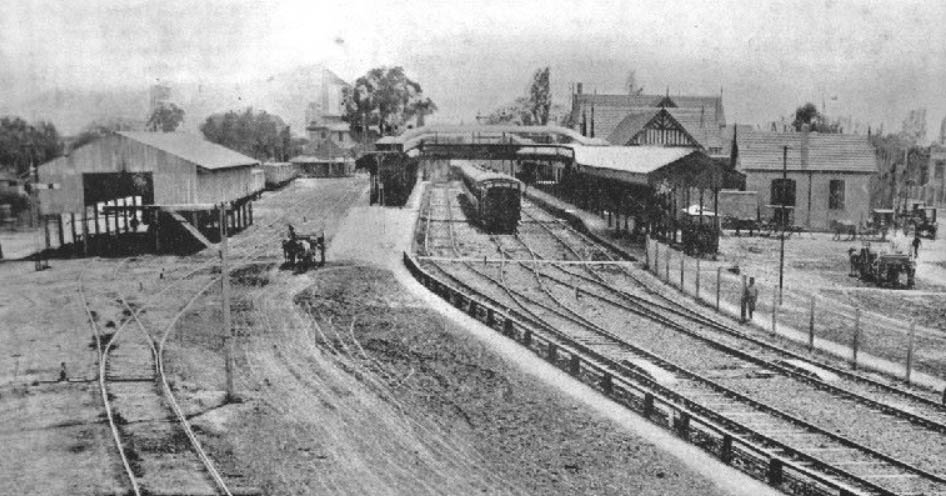
Railway station, c. 1900

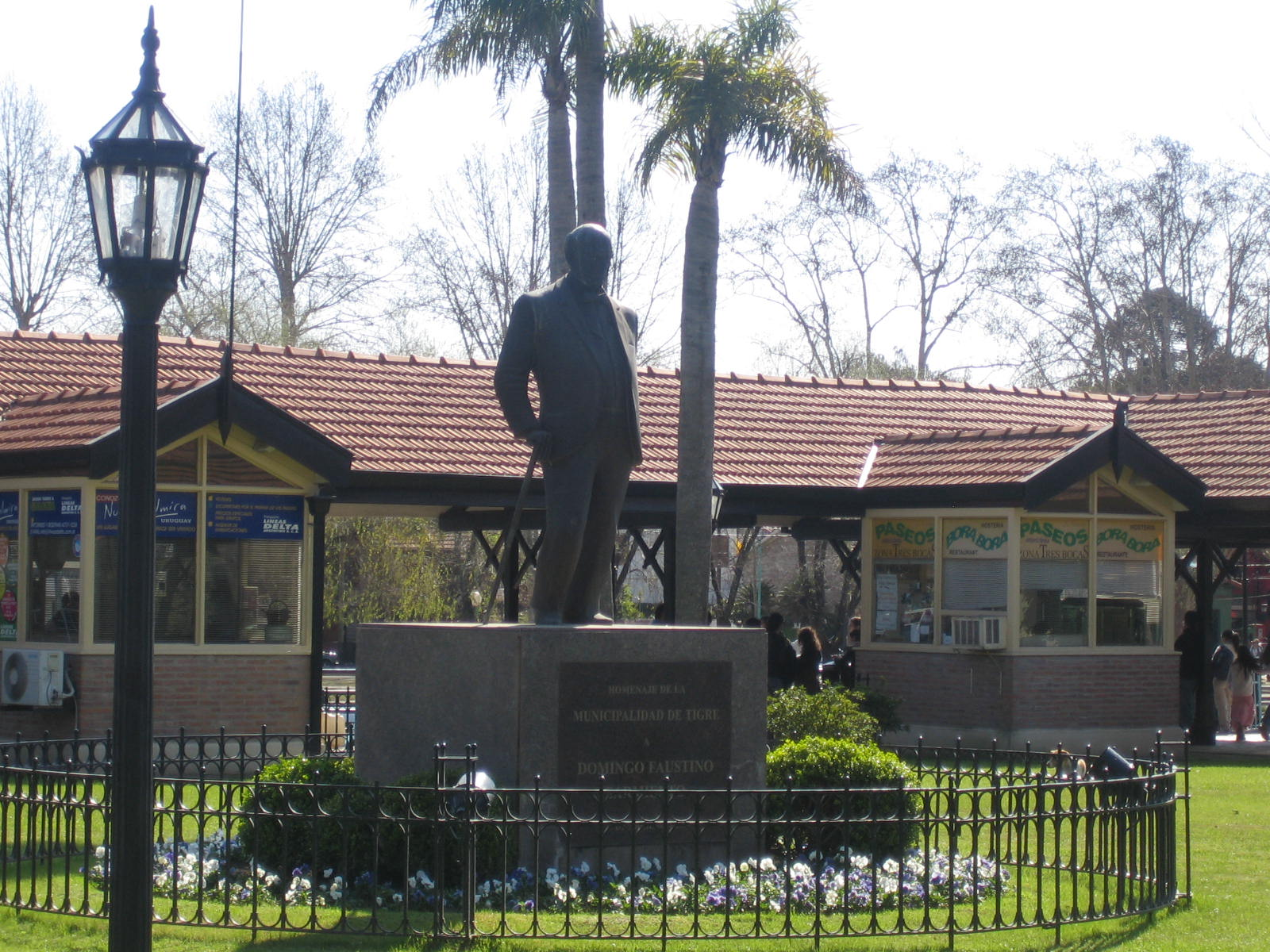
Sarmiento statue at the Boat Station

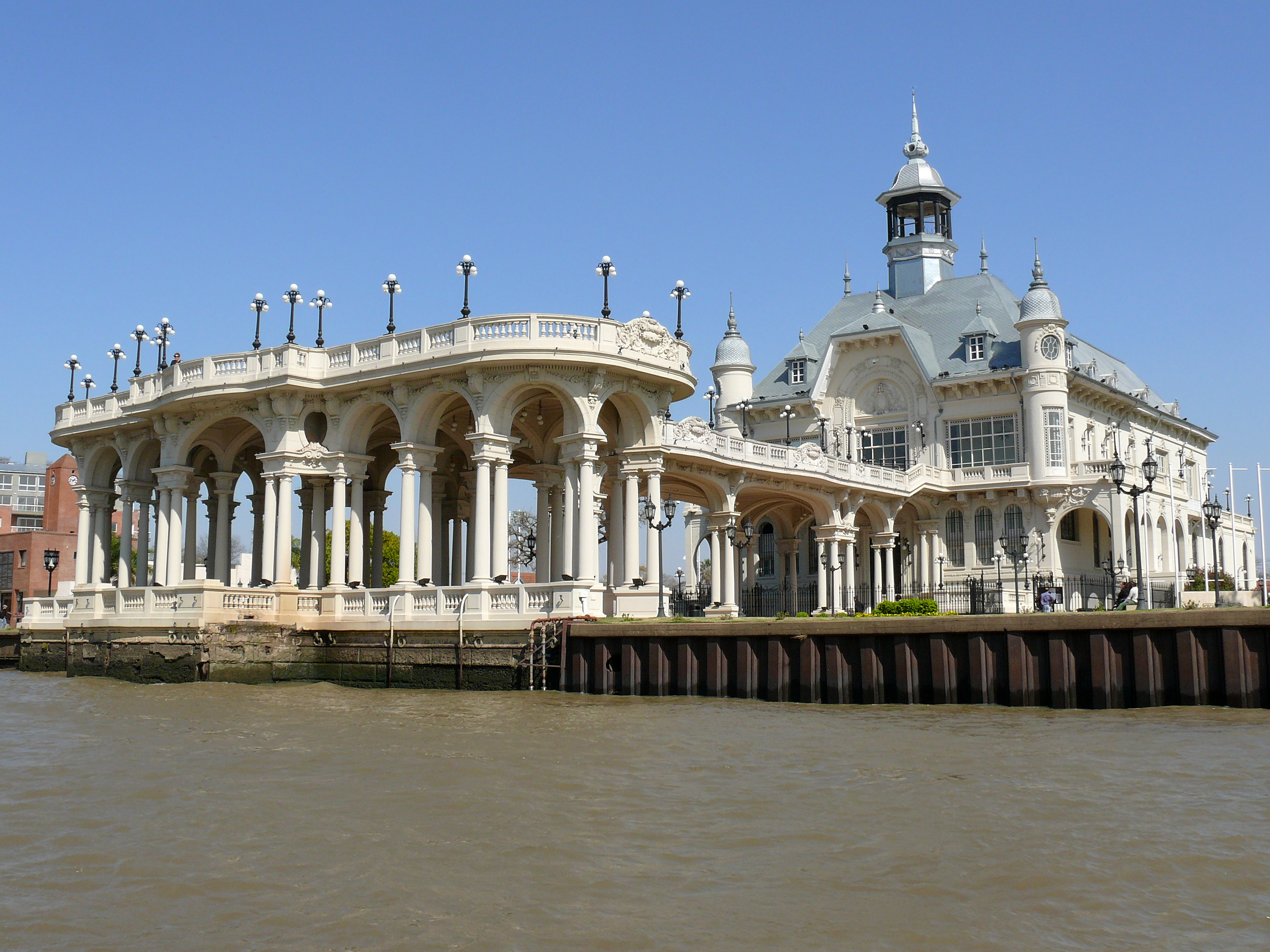
Tigre Art Museum ("Museo de Arte Tigre")

== See also ==
- Villa Paranacito, Entre Ríos
