= List of harpists =

This is a list of people who are notable as harpists, ordered by the first letter of their family name.

== A ==
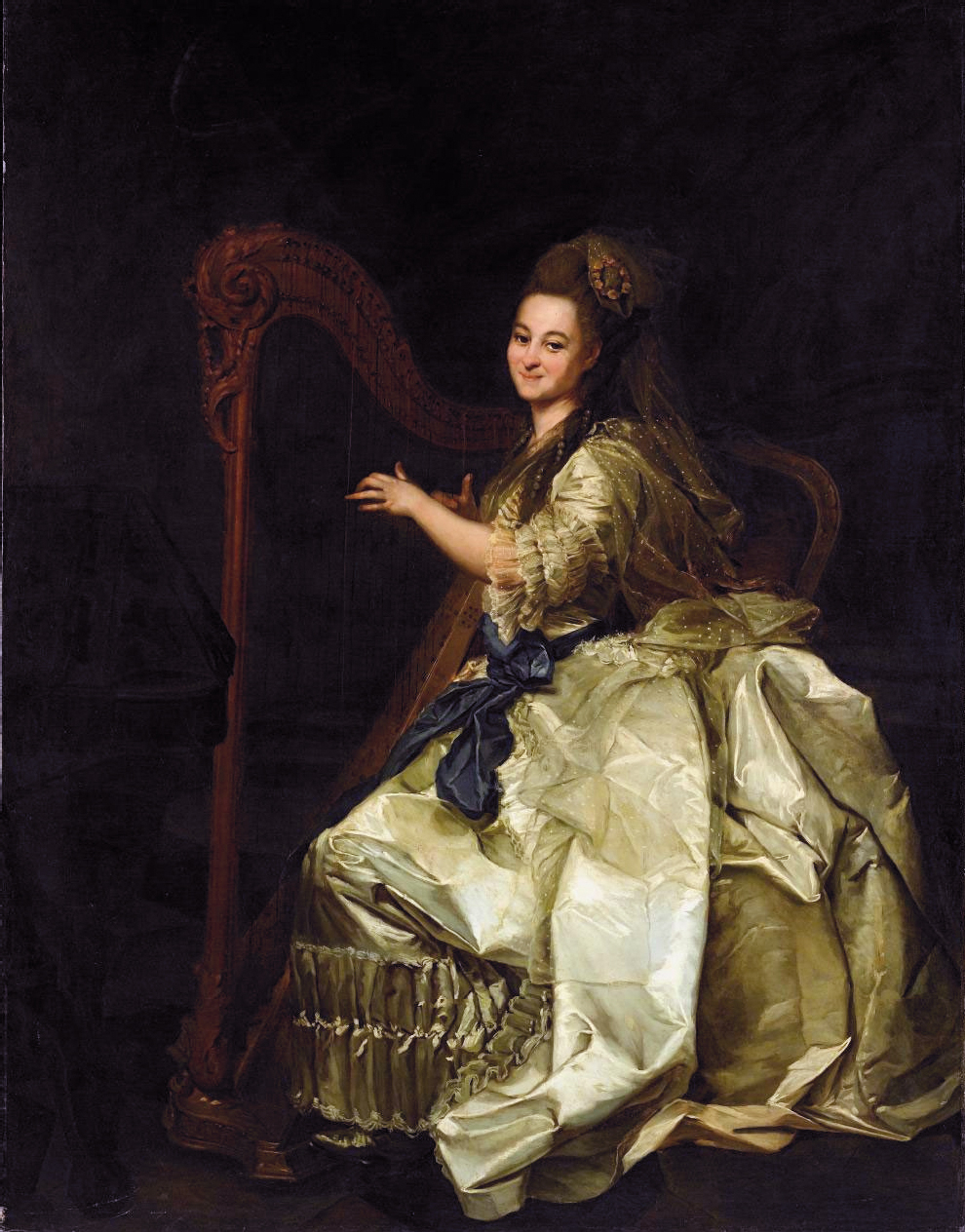
Portrait of Glafira Alymova

- Mike Absalom - English musician (including harp), poet and children's entertainer
- Ruth Acuff - American singer-songwriter and harpist
- Kirsten Agresta - American harpist and a board member of the World Harp Congress
- Pauline Åhman (1812–1904) - Swedish harpist
- Silke Aichhorn - German harpist
- Nancy Allen - American harpist
- Elias Parish Alvars (1808–1849) - English harpist and composer
- Glafira Alymova (1758–1826) - Russian lady-in-waiting and harpist
- Jon Anderson - English-American singer, songwriter and musician, and member of the band Yes
- Fulgencio Aquino (1915–1994) - Venezuelan musician and composer
- Dorothy Ashby (1932–1986) - American jazz harpist and composer
- Athy - Argentinian harpist and composer, also known as 'Athy, the electric harp'

== B ==
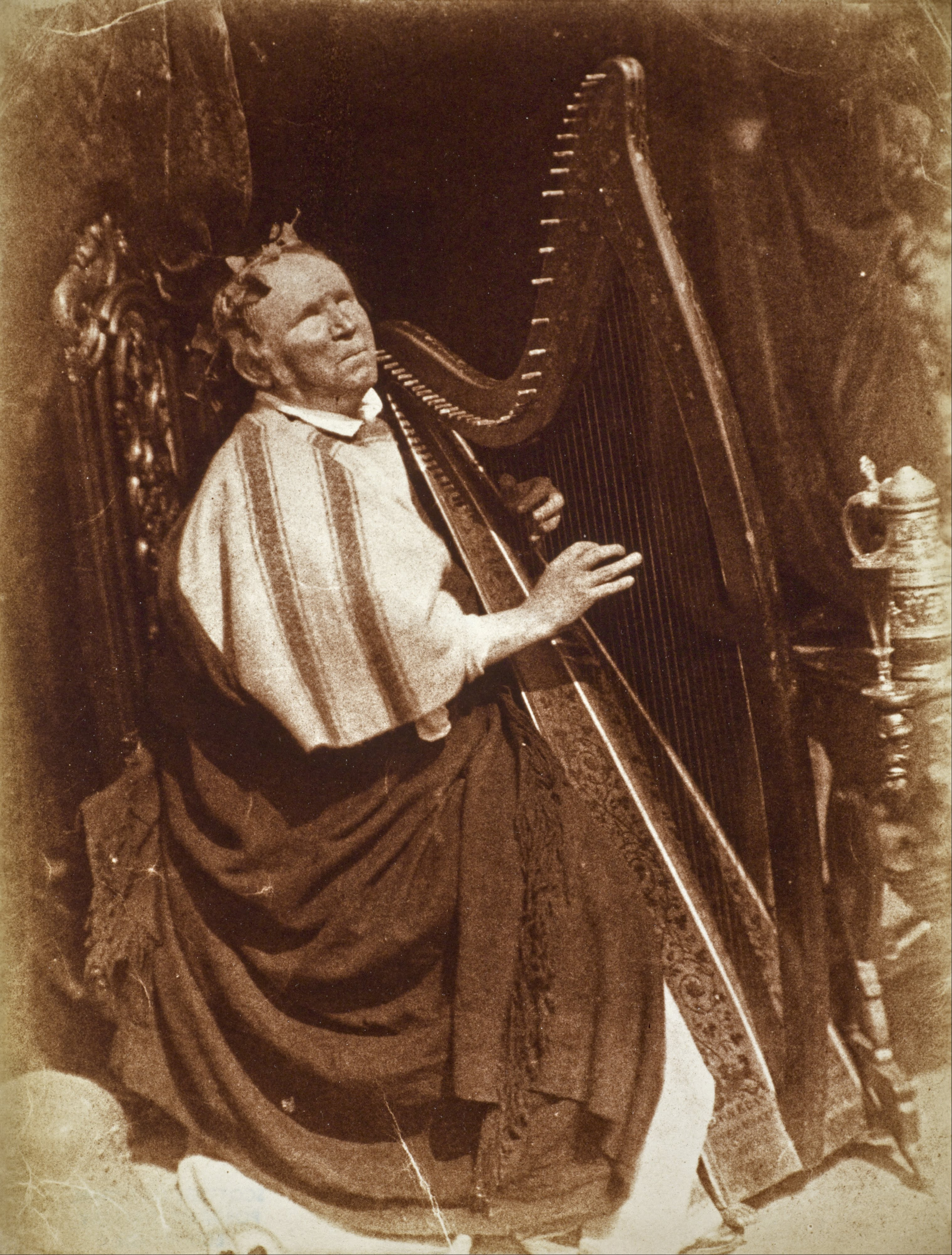
Patrick Byrne in the first known photograph of an Irish musician (c. 1845)

- Baby Dee
- Winifred Bambrick - (1892–1969) - Canadian classical musician and novelist
- Cormac de Barra - Irish singer, musician, and television presenter; part of the Moya Brennan Band
- William fitz Robert Barry - (fl. 1615) - blind harper in the service of David de Barry, 5th Viscount Buttevant
- Derek Bell
- Lucinda Belle
- Elinor Bennett
- Stephanie Bennett
- Hugo Blanco
- Hana Blažíková - (born 1980) - Czech soprano, harpist, and interpreter of Baroque, Medieval, and Renaissance music
- Nicolas-Charles Bochsa - (1789–1856) - French-Australian musician and composer appointed to the Imperial Orchestra
- Alexander Boldachev - (born 1990) Swiss Russian composer, arranger, harpist of academic, improvised and crossover work; founder of Zurich Harp Festival
- Jana Boušková (born 1970)
- Robin Huw Bowen - Exponent of the Welsh Triple Harp and authentic Welsh harp repertoire
- Cristina Braga
- Moya Brennan - (born 1952) - Irish folk singer, songwriter, harpist, and philanthropist; member of Clannad
- Hélène Breschand - (born 1966) - French harpist and composer
- Corina Brouder
- Giolla Críost Brúilingeach
- Olivia Buckley
- Charles Bunworth - (1704 – 1772) - Church of Ireland rector of Buttevant, County Cork, Ireland
- Ursula Burns
- Patrick Byrne - (c. 1794 – 1863) - last noted Gaelic harpist in Ireland and first Irish musician to be photographed

== C ==
- Maria Rosa Calvo-Manzano
- Félix Pérez Cardozo
- Dee Carstensen
- Edmar Castañeda
- Clotilde Cerdà (1861–1926), also known as Esmeralda Cervantes
- Emmanuel Ceysson
- Cecilia Chailly
- Alice Chalifoux
- Máire Ní Chathasaigh - (born 1956) - five-time winner of the All-Ireland music competition
- Pearl Chertok
- Elaine Christy
- Zhay Clark (1895-1980), later known as Zhay Moor
- Marie-Elizabeth Cléry - (1761–1795) - French composer and harpist in the court of Marie-Antoinette
- Alice Coltrane
- Thomas Connellan - (c. 1640 – 1698) - Irish harper and composer whose "Molly St. George" is one of the earliest Irish harp songs with extant lyrics; brother of William Connellan
- William Connellan - 17th century Irish harper and composer; brother of Thomas Connellan
- Cécile Corbel - (born 1980) - Breton recording artist and composer

== D ==
- Abramino dall'Arpa - (1577–1593) - one of the few Jewish musicians in Mantua, Italy in the late 16th century
- Abramo dall'Arpa - (died 1566) - Italian harpist in the court of Mantua, Italy, and later tutor of the children of Ferdinand I, Holy Roman Emperor
- Rhodri Davies - British harpist and composer
- Mikaela Davis - American musician, harpist, songwriter, vocalist and producer, known for her work with the band Southern Star
- Vera Dulova (1909–2000) - Russian harpist and instructor
- Sophia Dussek (1775–1831) - Italian-British harpist, singer and composer

== E ==
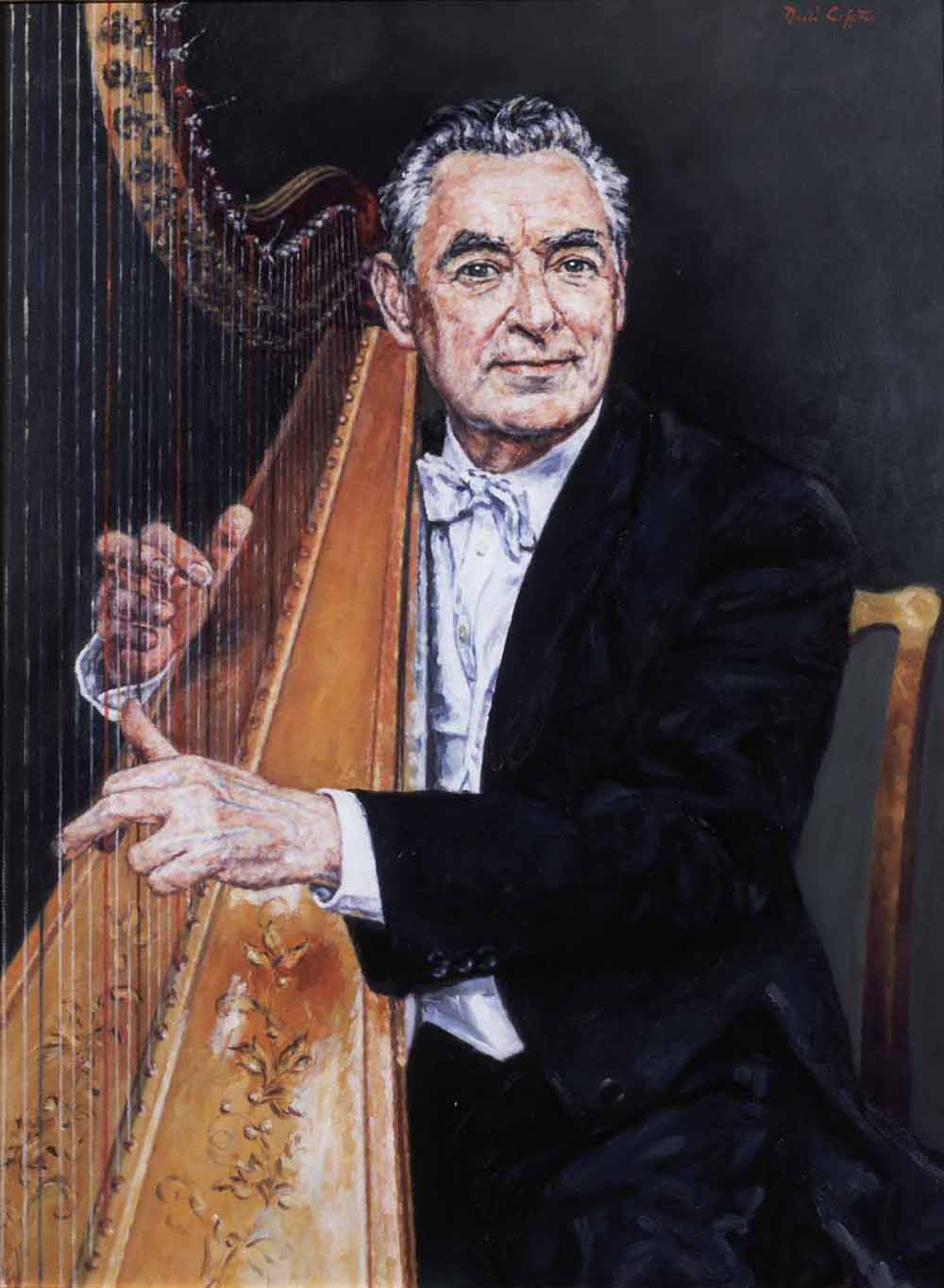
Portrait of Osian Ellis by David Griffiths

- Osian Ellis (1928–2021) - Welsh harpist, composer and teacher
- Víctor Espínola - Paraguayan multi-instrumentalist and singer, best known for playing the Paraguayan harp

== F ==
- Órla Fallon - (born 1974) - Irish soloist, songwriter, and former member of the group Celtic Woman and the chamber choir Anúna
- Vincent Fanelli - (1881–1966) - Italian-American classical musician and educator, principal harpist of the Philadelphia Orchestra
- Charles Fanning - (1736 – c. 1792) - winner of Ireland's Granard Harp Festival in 1781, 1782, and 1783
- Piaras Feiritéar - (c. 1600 – 1653) - poet and Catholic Irish leader
- Ignacio Figueredo - (1899–1995) - Venezuelan folk musician
- Catrin Finch - (born 1980) - Welsh harpist, arranger, and composer; Official Harpist to the Prince of Wales from 2000 to 2004
- Cheryl Ann Fulton - American performer and teacher

== G ==
- Mara Galassi
- Marilinda Garcia
- Stéphanie Félicité, comtesse de Genlis - (1746–1830) - French writer, harpist, and educator known for her children's works
- Adele Girard
- Betty Glamann
- Félix Godefroid
- Marie Goossens
- Sidonie Goossens
- Tristan Le Govic
- Phamie Gow
- Marcel Grandjany

== H ==
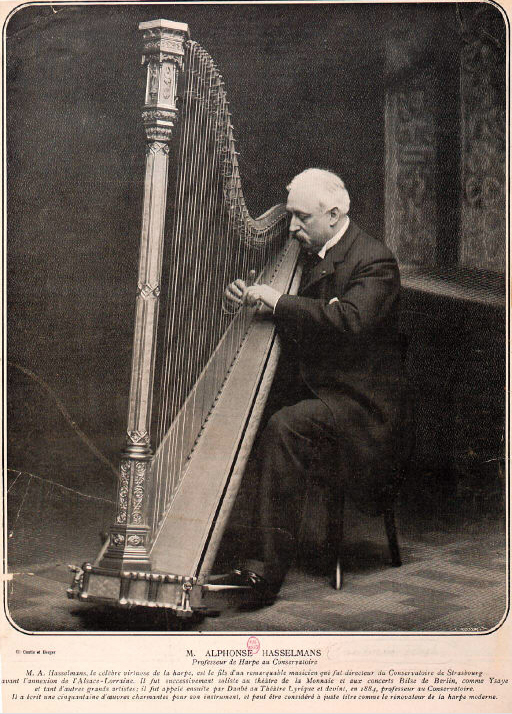
Alphonse Hasselmans

- Keiji Haino
- Rachel Hair - Scottish folk harpist
- Corky Hale
- Janet Harbison - Irish harper
- Ruth Berman Harris
- Alphonse Hasselmans
- Petra van der Heide
- Deborah Henson-Conant
- Corrina Hewat - (born 1970) - winner of Scotland's Music Tutor of the Year award at the 2013 Na Trads
- Hugh Higgins - (1737–1791) - blind Irish harper
- Erin Hill
- Franziska Huhn - (born 1977) - German-American performer and composer; winner of the Jugend musiziert prize
- Robert ap Huw

== I ==
- Varvara Ivanova (born 1987) - Russian harpist

== J ==
- Adria Jackson (musician) - Canadian female traditional Celtic folk singer and harpist
- Angharad James (1677–1749) - Welsh female poet and harpist
- James James (1832–1902) Welsh musician, composer of the Welsh national anthem, Hen Wlad fy Nhadau
- Siân James (born 1961) - Welsh traditional folk singer and harpist
- Pierre Jamet (1893–1991) - French harpist and teacher
- Elizabeth Jaxon - American harpist, director of the World Harp Competition and member of the band Atlantic Harp Duo
- Maria Johansdotter (fl. 1706) - Swedish harpist, folk music player and parish clerk, put on trial for homosexuality and for posing as a man
- Claire Jones - Welsh harpist
- Edward Jones (Bardd y Brenin) (1752–1824) - Welsh harpist and collector of music

== K ==
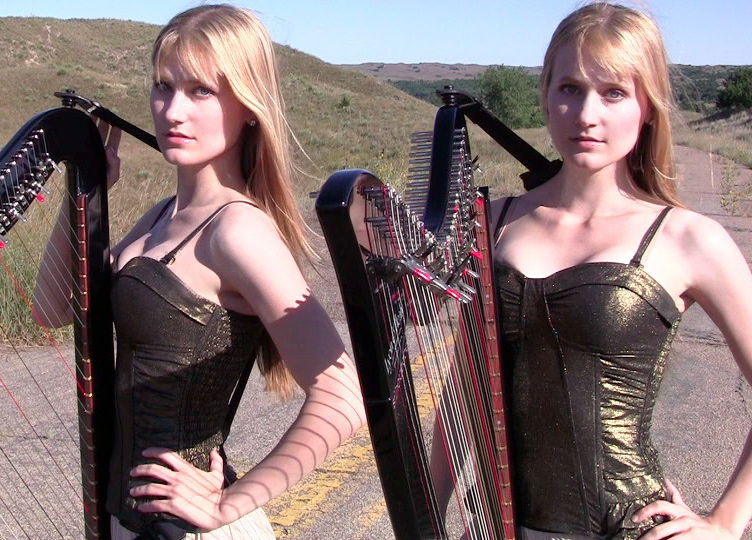
Camille and Kennerly Kitt with their electric harps

- Skaila Kanga
- Camille and Kennerly Kitt
- Eduard Klassen
- Yolanda Kondonassis
- Maria Korchinska
- Iris Kroes
- Johann Baptist Krumpholtz
- Valeria Kurbatova

== L ==
- Théodore Labarre - (1805–1870) - French harpist, composer, and professor
- Lily Laskine - (1893–1988) - French performer and professor who received the Legion of Honour in 1958
- Mary Lattimore
- Lucile Lawrence
- Anne LeBaron
- Caroline Leonardelli - French-Canadian performer and recording artist; principal harpist with the Ottawa Symphony
- Melanie Lewy - (1823–1856)
- Lloyd Lindroth
- Judy Loman
- Lisa Lynne
- Cornelius Lyons - (1670–1740) - Irish harper of the Earl of Antrim

== M ==
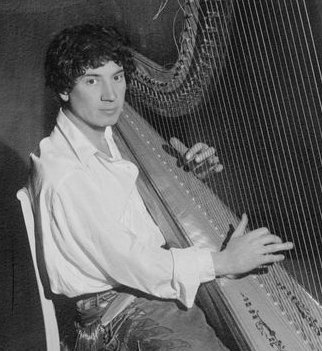
Harpo Marx

- Marie Antoinette - last queen of France
- Cormac MacDermott - (?–1618) - harper with the English Royal Musick
- Amhlaeibh Mac Innaighneorach - (?–1168) - Chief Harper of Ireland, one of the earliest recorded Irish professional musicians
- Manuel Machado
- Mary Macmaster - (born 1955) - Scottish harpist who performs with The Poozies and in the duo Sileas
- Eileen Malone
- José Marín
- Harpo Marx - (1888–1964)
- Gulnara Mashurova
- Susann McDonald
- Marshall McGuire
- Loreena McKennitt CM OM - (born 1957) - Canadian composer and multi-instrumentalist whose albums have sold more than 14 million copies
- Geraldine McMahon
- Katie McMahon
- Lavinia Meijer
- Luisa Menárguez
- Anna Maria Mendieta
- Orazio Michi
- Susanna Mildonian
- Valérie Milot - Canadian soloist and chamber musician; the first harpist to win the Prix d’Europe
- Áine Minogue
- Rose Mooney
- David Murphy

== N ==
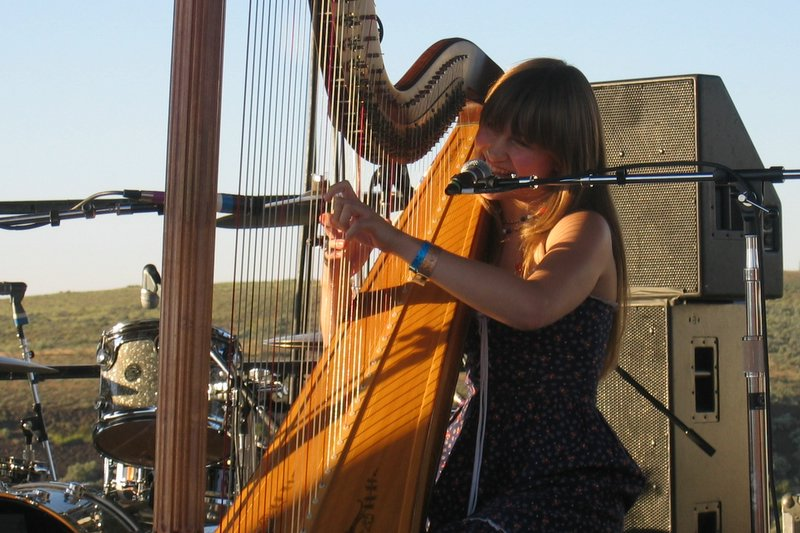
Joanna Newsom at the 2005 Sasquatch Music Festival

- François Joseph Naderman
- Jean Henri Naderman
- Fatma Ceren Necipoğlu
- Lily Neill
- Joanna Newsom

== O ==
- Máel Sechnaill Ruadh Ó Braonáin
- Donell Dubh Ó Cathail
- Eachmarcach Ó Catháin
- Ruaidri Dáll Ó Catháin
- Maol Ruanaidh Cam Ó Cearbhaill
- Eoghain Ó Cianáin
- Thady Ó Cianáin
- Fláithrí Ó Corcrán
- Cearbhall Óg Ó Dálaigh - (fl. 1630) - Irish poet and harpist
- Diarmuid Ó Dubhagáin
- Donnchadh Ó Hámsaigh
- Mary O'Hara
- Dominic Ó Mongain
- Máel Ísa Ó Raghallaigh
- Turlough O'Carolan
- Arthur O'Neill
- Natalia O'Shea
- Rüdiger Oppermann - (born 1954) - German experimental musician; plays a custom-made clàrsach with 38 gold-plated bronze strings and a special mechanism that allows him to bend notes in a manner akin to blues musicians
- Coline-Marie Orliac - (born 1989) - two-time winner of the USA International Harp Competition
- Alfredo Rolando Ortiz
- David Owen
- Siobhan Owen - (born 1993) - Welsh-Australian soprano; winner of several music awards including two Irish Music Awards

== P ==
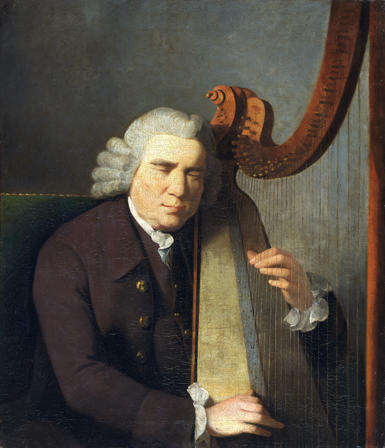
Portrait of John Parry, blind Welsh harpist, by his son, William Parry

- Annemiek Padt-Jansen
- Şirin Pancaroğlu
- Zeena Parkins
- John Parry - (1710–1782) - blind Welsh harpist, credited with writing Deck the Halls, inspiration for Thomas Gray's 1757 poem, The Bard (poem)
- John Parry - (1776–1851) - better known as Bardd Alaw
- Laura Peperara
- Roberto Perera
- Edna Phillips
- Jemima Phillips
- Nicholas Dáll Pierce
- Ann Hobson Pilot - (born 1943) - former principal harpist of the Boston Symphony Orchestra and the Boston Pops

== R ==
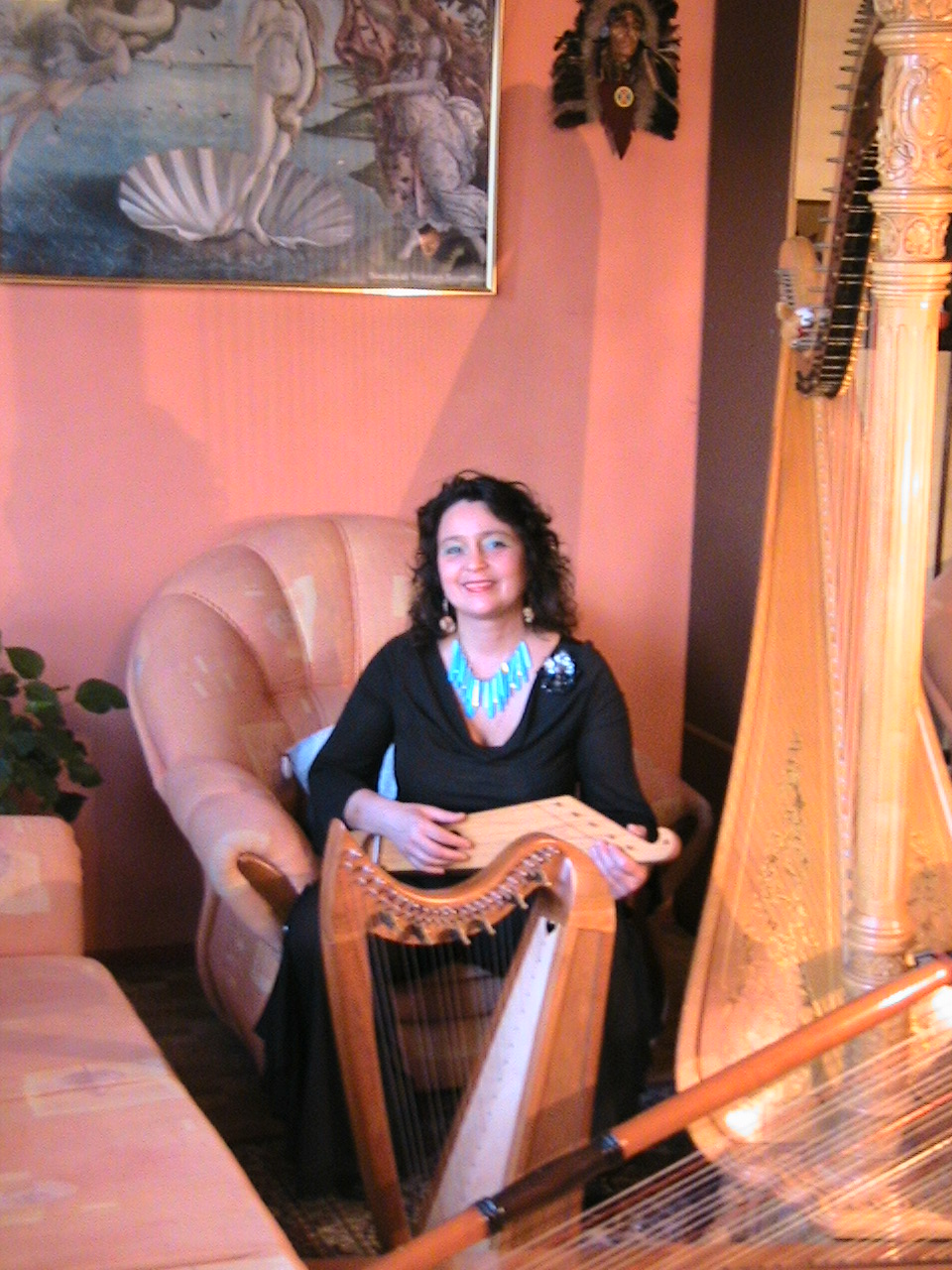
Anna-Maria Ravnopolska-Dean with her kantele, her grand concert, Irish and Paraguayan harp

- Monica Ramos
- Elizabeth Randles
- Anna-Maria Ravnopolska-Dean - (born 1960) - Bulgarian concert harpist and academic; a founder of the American University in Bulgaria
- Casper Reardon
- Susan Reed
- Henriette Renié
- Lucas Ruiz de Ribayaz
- Nansi Richards - (1888–1979) - Welsh harpist appointed official harpist to Charles, Prince of Wales
- Kim Robertson
- Marisa Robles
- Claire Roche
- Henrik Rohmann - (1910–1978) - Hungarian performer and teacher
- Clotilde Rosa
- Mindy Rosenfeld
- Diana Rowan
- Isabella Rudkin
- Jaroslav Řídký - (1897–1956) - Czech composed, conductor, harpist, and teacher

== S ==
- Floraleda Sacchi - (born 1978) - recording artist, composer, and musicologist from Italy
- Arnold Safroni-Middleton
- Victor Salvi
- Carlos Salzedo
- Arianna Savall
- Anne van Schothorst
- Patsy Seddon - Scottish harpist known for work with The Poozies, Sileas, and Clan Alba
- Therese Schroeder-Sheker
- Marianne Smit
- David Snell (musician)
- Monika Stadler
- Hilary Stagg
- Serafina Steer
- Savourna Stevenson
- Alan Stivell - (born 1944) - Celtic recording artist
- Jessica Suchy-Pilalis
- Tomoko Sugawara
- Andrei Sychra

== T ==
- Mia Theodoratus
- John Thomas
- Thomas Thomas
- Julia Thornton
- Miriam Timothy
- Beste Toparlak
- Juan Vicente Torrealba
- Marcel Tournier
- Tuotilo
- JoAnn Turovsky

== V ==
- Verónica Valerio - Mexican harpist, singer and composer
- Remy van Kesteren - Dutch harpist and founder of the 1000 Strings Festival
- Andreas Vollenweider - Swiss harpist

== W ==
- Maria Jane Williams (c.1795–1873) - Welsh harpist
- Sylvia Woods (harpist) - American harpist and composer
- Aristid von Würtzler (1925–1997) - Hungarian-American leader of the New York Harp Ensemble

== Y ==
- Astrid Ydén (1881–1963) - Swedish harpist
- Gráinne Yeats (1925–2013) - Irish harpist, singer and historian
- Brandee Younger - American harpist

== Z ==
- Nicanor Zabaleta
- Liao Zilan
- Vincenzo Zitello
