= Ruth Harris =

Ruth Harris may refer to:

- Ruth Harris (historian) (born 1958), American historian and author
- Ruth Harris (scientist) (fl. from 1991), earthquake researcher
- Ruth Berman Harris (cantor) (fl. from 1996), Argentinian cantor
- Ruth Berman Harris (harpist) (1916–2013), musician
