= Hyde-Smith =

Hyde-Smith is a surname. Notable people with the surname include:

- Christopher Hyde-Smith (1935–2024), British flautist
- Cindy Hyde-Smith (born 1959), American politician
