= ACUF =

ACUF may refer to:

- American Conservative Union Foundation, a part of the political organization American Conservative Union
- Advisory Committee on Undersea Features of the United States Board on Geographic Names

== See also ==
- Acuff (disambiguation)
