= Alfredo Rolando Ortiz =

Alfredo Rolando Ortiz (December 10, 1946) is an internationally acclaimed soloist of the Paraguayan harp, a composer, author, educator and recording artist.

== Biography ==
Alfredo considers his "most important concerts" playing in the delivery room during the birth of his second daughter, on New Years Eve, 1980, and for the birth of a grandson from each of his two daughters.

Dr. Alfredo Rolando Ortiz was invited to compose a piece to be premiered on July 22, 2008, during the Tenth World Harp Congress in Amsterdam, The Netherlands. Originally created for four harps or harp ensemble, the classical composition, titled "Cumbia Verde," was performed by 232 harpists.

Alfredo was born in Cuba. When he was eleven years old he immigrated with his family to Venezuela. Four years later he began studying the Venezuelan folk harp with his school friend Fernando Guerrero. A year later he became a pupil of Alberto Romero on the Paraguayan harp. Just two years after his first harp lesson, he began medical studies in Medellín, Colombia, began performing professionally and recorded his first album. Music supported his medical studies until graduation. Five years later he moved to the United States to continue studies of music therapy. Two years later he married Luz Marina Otero. For eight years from the time of his graduation from medical school, he worked in the medical field as well as a harpist and recording artist, until his wife became pregnant. In order to have time for his growing family, he then decided to dedicate his life only to them and to his first love: the harp.

With a multicultural repertoire which covers folk, classical and popular music of many countries, as well as his original compositions, Dr. Ortiz has performed for audiences of all ages and backgrounds. He has recorded over forty albums and is the winner of a Gold Record in South America. He has lectured on a variety of subjects at universities, colleges and schools, and at many international harp events, is the author of several harp music books and articles and his compositions have been performed and recorded by classical and folk harpists in many countries. His music is required study at harp departments in universities, conservatories and music schools around the world, and some are often required for competitions. His “Venezolana for Five Pedal Harps,” "Cuban Dream After the Storm," "Cumbia Verde," "Danza de Luzma," "Cumbia Deliciosa" and others, have become favorites of harp ensembles around the world.

His acclaimed “South American Suite for Harp and Orchestra” premiered on March 3, 1996. Dr Ortiz was invited to perform his Suite at the World Harp Congress in Prague, Czech Republic in 1999 with the Prague Radio Symphony Orchestra, for an audience of hundreds of classical harpists from around the world.

Among his concerts and recitals are:

- Opening Concert of the First World Harp Congress, the Netherlands, 1983
- Third [World Harp Congress], [Vienna], [Austria], 1987
- Rochas Festival of the Harp, Paraguay, 1988
- Edinburgh International Harp Festival, Scotland, 1987, 1991 & 2005
- World Harp Festival, Belfast, Northern Ireland, 1992
- Soka International Harp Festival, Japan, 1990, 1994, 1998 & 2013
- International Folk Harp Conference, 1984, 86, 88, 90, 92, 94, 2000, 2003, 2005 & 2010
- World Harp Congress, Dublin, Ireland, 2005
- Latin American Harps Encounter, Venezuela - 1998, Mexico - 2000 & 2004, Brazil - 2006
- World Harp Congress, the Netherlands, 2008
- World Harp Congress, Cardiff, Wales, 2022

== Personal life ==
After being featured on the Youtube channel 'Channel 5', it was revealed his most important performance was his playing of the harp in the delivery room during the birth of his second daughter, Michelle Ortiz.
