= Dutch Harp Festival =

Biannual music event

1000 Strings Festival (formerly the Dutch Harp Festival)
- Genre: Music festival
- Dates: 2028: April (exact dates vary each time)
- Locations: TivoliVredenburg, Utrecht
- Country: Netherlands
- Years active: 2010 - present (every 2 years)
- Founded: 2010; 16 years ago
- Website: https://www.1000strings.nl/en/

The 1000 Strings Festival (formerly the Dutch Harp Festival) is a harp musical festival that takes place every two years in Utrecht, Netherlands. The festival was founded in 2010 and features harpists from around the world and a variety of musical genres. The festival also includes visuals, sound and light installations, instrument workshops, and an area to try out different harps. From 2026 the festival was renamed "1000 Strings Festival".

The World Harp Competition finals (and since 2024 the semifinals) also take place alongside the festival.

== Previous festivals ==
=== 2026 ===
The 1000 Strings Festival took place on Saturday, 18 April at TivoliVredenburg, Utrecht, Netherlands. The 2026 lineup featured DAL:UM, Emmanuel Padilla Holguín, Gwyneth Wentink, Juanjo Corbalán x band, Kevin Le Pennec, Lavinia Meijer, Lubiana, Margaret Hermant (ft. Echo Collective), Nana Osei Twun Barima, Pia Salvia, Petite Klassiek (Knisper), Quintette Le Bateau Ivre (ft. Jean Baptiste), Rachel Newton x band, Remy van Kesteren, Trijntje Oosterhuis, Tristan Le Govic.

=== 2024 ===
The 2024 the festival was titled Night of a 1000 Strings and the lineup included Deborah Henson-Conant, Brandee Younger, Catrin Finch and Aoife Ní Bhriain (violin), Remy van Kesteren, Alexander Boldachev and Alexandr Misko (guitar), Tom Monger (from Florence + The Machine), Angélica Salvi, Tempo! (Oorkaan Ensemble), Charles Overton, Juanjo Corbalán Quartet (featuring 2022 DHF World Harp Competition winner Juanjo Corbalán), Miriam Adefris, XKTdra – sound immersion, Thessa Carina, ROWANN, Ensemble Místico, and Ranie Ribeiro. Both the World Harp Competition semifinals and finals were held alongside the festival.

The festival was sold out weeks before the event and for more than 60% of the visitors it was their first time attending a harp concert.

=== 2022 ===
The 2022 festival was held online and the lineup included Mary Lattimore, Andrew Lawrence-King, Remy van Kesteren, Mahazer, Kety Fusco, XNDR and Remy van Kesteren, Héloïse Carlean-Jones, Julie Rokseth, and Sophie Nzayisenga.

=== 2021 (originally 2020) ===
The festival was streamed online in 2021 due to COVID-19 pandemic restrictions. It was originally scheduled for May 2020 but was postponed for a year due to the pandemic. Performers included Lavinia Meijer, Tom Monger (from Florence + The Machine), Mary Lattimore, Remy van Kesteren, Sunniva Rødland and Notam.

=== 2018 ===
In 2018 the theme for the festival was Welcome to Planet Harp. The lineup included Nikolaz Cadoret, Hélène Breschand, Edmar Castañeda and Remy van Kesteren.

=== 2016 ===
Harps Without Borders (Dutch: Harpen Zonder Grenzen) was the theme of the 2016 festival. The lineup included Sivan Magen, Ben Creighton Griffiths, Catrin Finch, Park Stickney, Marie-Pierre Langlamet, Remy van Kesteren, and Nobody's Cult. Sharing the venue in 2016 alongside the festival was the Open Harp Day, hosted by the Dutch Harp Society and the Dutch Folk Harp Society. The festival was also integrated into the Jazz Harp Academy.

=== 2014 ===
The theme for the 2014 festival was No Harp, No Story and featured many harpists including Benjamin Bagby, Remy van Kesteren and Claron McFadden.

=== 2012 ===
Real Men Play The Harp was the theme of the 2012 festival. Performers included Andrew Lawrence-King, Edmar Castañeda and Eric Vloeimans, and Remy van Kesteren.

=== 2010 ===
This was the first year that festival was held and it was simply titled International Harp Competition & Festival. Performers included Anne-Marie O'Farrel and Sivan Magen, and Remy van Kesteren.

== Funding ==
In June 2024 the Utrecht festival subsidy committee advised the municipality to terminate the multi-year subsidy of many local festivals including the 1000 Strings Festival. This threatened the continuation of the festival and the renowned World Harp Competition.

== Organizers ==
The team includes Remy van Kesteren (artistic director), Gert Wijnalda (Business Director), Elizabeth Jaxon (Competition Director), Paul Hooijmans (Finance), Marit Nijhuis (Production), Jochem Winterwerp (Marketing) and Henriett Somlai (Public Relations and Press). Volunteers help to make the event possible by supporting as guides, harp movers, drivers, and roles in the restaurant, ticketing desk and information areas.
