= Acuff =

Acuff is a surname. Notable people with the surname include:

- Amy Acuff (born 1975), American athlete
- Darius Acuff Jr. (born 2006), American basketball player
- Eddie Acuff (1903–1956), American actor
- Roy Acuff (1903–1992), American musician
- Ruth Acuff, American singer-songwriter
