= Humphrey Brooke (art historian) =

British art historian (1914–1988)

- Brooke in 1953
- Born: Thomas Humphrey Brooke; 31 January 1914
- Died: 24 December 1988 (aged 74)
- Education: Wellington College; Magdalen College, Oxford
- Occupations: Civil servant and art historian
- Spouse: Nathalie Benckendorff (1946–1988; his death)
- Relatives: Maria Korchinska (mother-in-law)

Lieutenant-Colonel Thomas Humphrey Brooke CVO (31 January 1914 – 24 December 1988) was a British civil servant and art historian. He was a Monuments Man during the Second World War, then deputy director of London's Tate Gallery and secretary of the Royal Academy from 1952 to 1968. Serious depression in his 50s led to his early retirement, after which he became "an internationally acknowledged expert on roses".

== Early life ==
Humphrey Brooke was born on 31 January 1914 into a family of Yorkshire wool millers. He was educated at Wellington College and Magdalen College, University of Oxford, where he graduated with a first in modern history.

== Career ==
During the Second World War, Brooke worked in Italy with the Monuments, Fine Arts, and Archives program, rising to the rank of lieutenant colonel, and did further such work in 1946 in Austria.

He was deputy director of London's Tate Gallery, and then Secretary of the Royal Academy from 1952 to 1968. In 1960, he declared that a 42-by-30-inch (1.07 m × 0.76 m) painting believed to have been painted by Andrea del Verrocchio was actually painted by Leonardo da Vinci, making it the oldest known painting by Leonardo.

Serious manic depression led to his early retirement, after which he became "an internationally acknowledged expert on roses". He grew over 500 varieties of roses at his home, Lime Kiln in Suffolk, and in 1971 opened Lime Kiln to the public, calling it "the first rosarium in Great Britain". Brooke thought that his manic depression "could only be cured by sex and smoking". He studied many other historical figures who may have suffered from manic depression, and was particularly interested in Somerset County Cricket Club batsman Harold Gimblett. In 1982, Brooke wrote an article for The Observer about his illness, which received over 150 responses.

== Personal life ==
Brooke married Nathalie Benckendorff, whom he met in Austria after the war while working as a monuments man. Her mother was the harpist Maria Korchinska. Benckendorff's grandfather, Alexander Konstantinovich Benckendorff, was the Russian Empire's last ambassador to the UK. Brooke was friends with fellow East Anglian rosarian Peter Beales.

Brooke died on 24 December 1988. A portrait of Brooke smoking by Olwyn Bowey hangs at the Royal Academy.
