= Phia Berghout =

Dutch harpist (1909–1993)

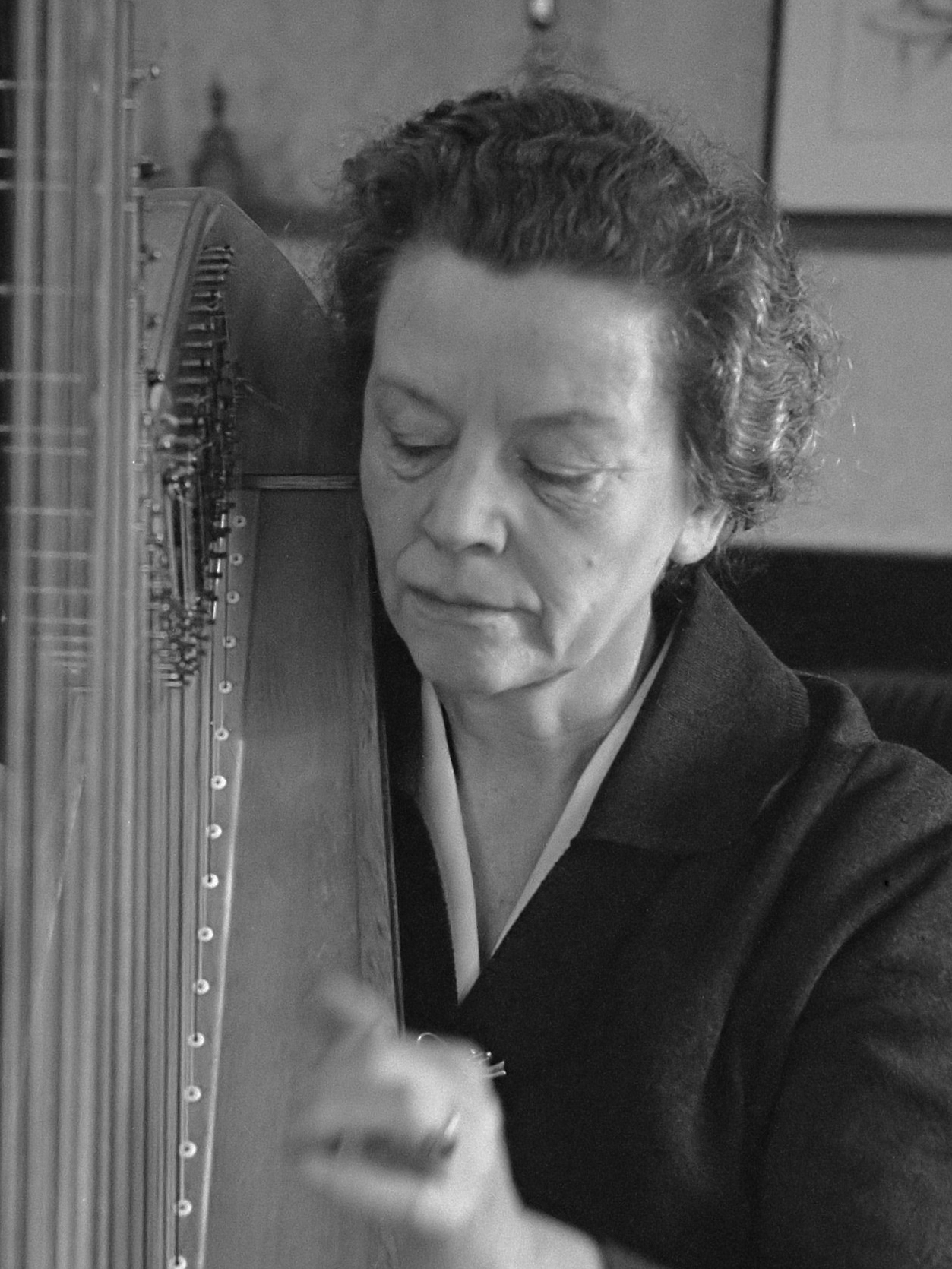
Berghout in 1964

Sophia Rosa Berghout (14 December 1909 - 22 March 1993) was a Dutch harpist. Her obituary in The Independent called her "arguably the most influential harpist this century".

== Career ==
She was born in Rotterdam on 14 December 1909 and started playing the harp when she was 15 years old. She studied the harp at the Amsterdam Conservatoire with Rosa Spier. She played in the Amsterdam Concertgebouw, as second harp 1933-1945 and principal harp 1945–1960, as well as having a successful solo career. She taught at the Amsterdam Conservatoire and then, from 1974, at the Maastricht Conservatoire.

Together with Maria Korchinska (1895–1979) she established the International Harpweeks held at Queekhoven near Amsterdam in the 1960s; these developed into the World Harp Congress.

== Personal life ==
Berghout married Johannes den Hertog, pianist and assistant conductor of the Amsterdam Concertgebouw: they divorced after a short time. She died in Doorn on 22 March 1993, aged 83.
