= Elizabeth Jaxon =

American harpist

- Born: Champaign, Illinois, United States
- Genres: Classical
- Occupation: Harpist
- Instrument: Harp
- Years active: 1999–present
- Website: https://elizabethjaxon.com/

Elizabeth Jaxon is an American harpist. Originally from Champaign, Illinois, United States she is now based in Utrecht in the Netherlands. She is the Competition Director for the World Harp Competition.

== Education ==
Elizabeth Jaxon has degrees in harp performance from the University of Illinois Urbana-Champaign and the École Normale de Musique de Paris where, in 2009, she obtained the highest-level degree offered there—the Diplôme Supérieur de Concertiste.

== Career ==
Elizabeth Jaxon participated in many international competitions including the USA International Harp Competition, Nippon International Harp Competition, and the International Harp Contest in Israel. She was awarded top prizes in the North London Festival of Music and Drama, the first International Harp Competition of Szeged, Hungary, and the American Harp Society National Competition.

She was formerly a harp instructor at Mahidol University School of Music, in Bangkok Thailand, as well as principal harp of the Thailand Philharmonic Orchestra. Jaxon is the circulation manager at Harp Column, a magazine featuring news and information for harpists worldwide.

In 2006 Jaxon formed the Atlantic Harp Duo with Marta Power Luce. They give regular performances around the world. In 2014 they performed at the World Harp Congress in Sydney.

=== 1000 Strings Festival and World Harp Competition ===
Elizabeth Jaxon has served as one of the board members of the 1000 Stings Festival (formerly the Dutch Harp Festival) since its inception in 2010. She is also the Competition Director for the World Harp Competition, an international harp competition open to harpists from all nationalities, ages and genres.

== Discography ==
Jaxon has released albums with harpist Marta Power Luce as part of their group Atlantic Harp Duo.

Year	Title	Credit
2011	A Journey with Chopin & Sand	Atlantic Harp Duo
2014	Rhythms of Spain	Atlantic Harp Duo
2020	Ariadne Rediviva	Atlantic Harp Duo

== Orchestral experience ==
Year(s)	Position	Orchestra/Group	City/State	Country
2015	First Sub-Principal Harp	Netherlands Camerata (NedCam)	Amsterdam	Netherlands
2015	Second Harp	Het Orkest Amsterdam	Amsterdam	Netherlands
2014–2015	Principal Harp	Bataafs Symphonie Orkest	The Hague	Netherlands
2014	Orchestra Audition Training	Sandrine Chatron	Amsterdam	Netherlands
2010–2013	Principal Harp	Thailand Symphony Orchestra	Bangkok	Thailand
2010	Principal Harp	Orchestre de la Cité Internationale	Paris	France
2007, 2010	Principal Harp	Orchestre Symphonique et Lyrique	Paris	France
2010		Tehran Symphony Orchestra		European tour
2009	Principal Harp	Société Symphonique et Chorale de la Poste et de France Télécom	Paris	France
2009	Second Harp	Orchestre Pasdeloup; Théâtre du Châtelet	Paris	France
2006	String Section	Kanye West	Illinois	USA
2006	Principal Harp	Winchester Orchestra of San Jose	California	USA
2004		Britten Ceremony of Carols, various choirs	Illinois	USA
2003	Principal Harp	Welseyan Civic Orchestra	Illinois	USA
2002	Principal Harp	Galesburg Community Chorus	Illinois	USA
2001	Principal Harp	Illinois State University Symphony	Illinois	USA
2000	Second Harp	Champaign-Urbana Symphony Orchestra	Illinois	USA
