= Ruth Berman Harris (cantor) =

Argentine hazzan

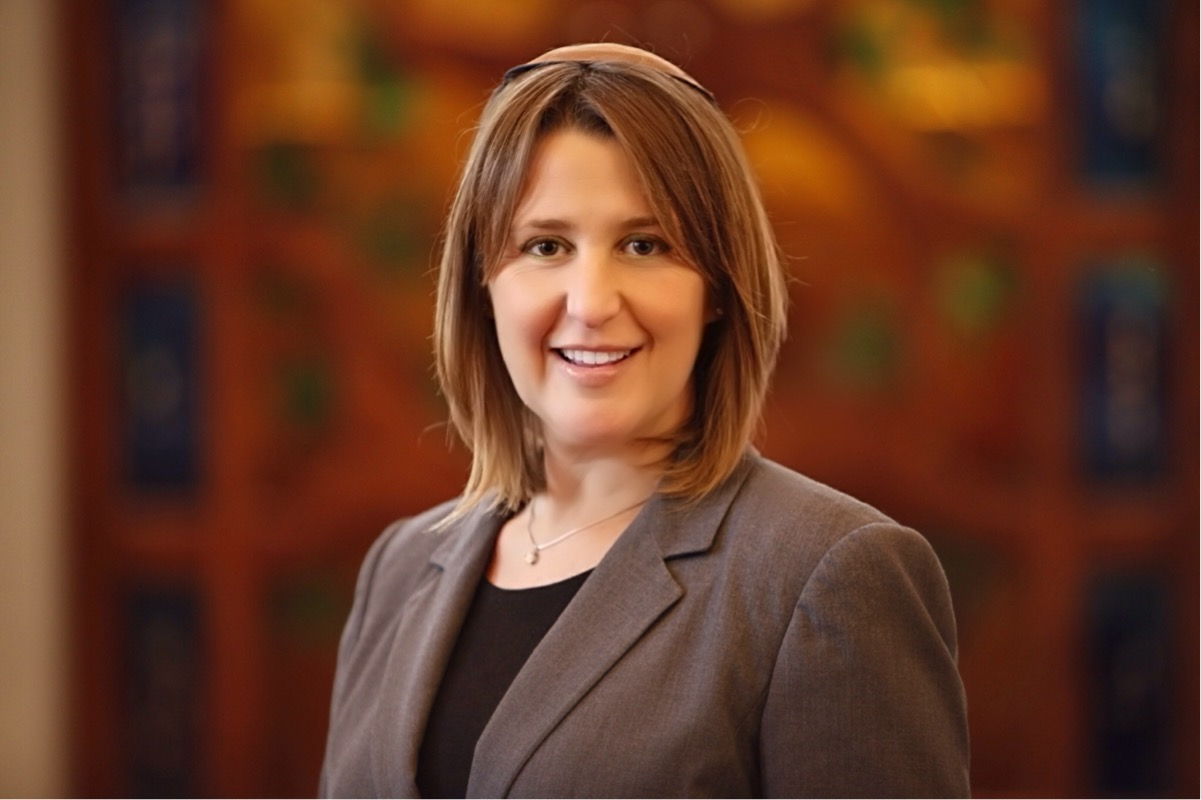
Cantor Ruth Berman Harris

Ruth Berman Harris (Hebrew: רות ברמן האריס) was the first female cantor (also called hazzan) in Argentina. She was born in Buenos Aires, where as a teenager she became the first female in Argentina to lead Jewish services.

She was educated as a cantor at the Seminario Rabínico Latinoamericano in Argentina, and was ordained in 1996. She also earned a bachelor's degree in Talmud and Bible from Bar-Ilan University in Israel, as well as finishing a cantorial program from the World Union for Progressive Judaism.

She moved to Israel in 1996, where she led services at three different synagogues, and in 2001 she moved to America; as of 2011 she is the cantor at Pasadena Jewish Temple and Center. She has also made a CD, "B'Rosh HaShanah", featuring herself singing some of the highlights of the Jewish service music.

== Family life ==
Ruth met her soon to be husband, Laurence Harris, in Buenos Aires and they soon moved to Israel together and got married. On October 10, 1997, two weeks after they got married, they had their first son, Haim Ariel Harris. Two years later, on September 5, 1999, they had their second child, a daughter named Jessica Talia Harris. Ruth and Laurence had their final child on April 13, 2001, a boy named Jonathan Adam Harris.
