= Lucinda Belle =

British singer-songwriter and harpist (born 1987)

- Born: Lucinda Barry; June 7, 1987 (age 39); London, England
- Origin: British
- Occupations: Harpist, singer, songwriter

Lucinda Belle (born Lucinda Barry, 7 June 1987), is a British singer, songwriter, and harpist.

== Early years ==
Belle played the harp from an early age; she joined the National Children's Orchestra, and in 1990, she appeared on TV series Opportunity Knocks hosted by Les Dawson, and won that episode.

In the early years of her career, she worked as a jazz singer in various clubs in London. She participated as vocalist in Bump & Flex with UK garage DJ Grant Nelson and in session singing for Karl 'Tuff Enuff' Brown.

Away from the classic harp world, she studied jazz harp in Nashville. Her first production as a solo artist was with First Avenue where she recorded and released Feel of Fire with PolyGram, as Lucy Skye.

== Career ==
In 2008, she signed a record deal with Epic Records to release the album My Voice and 45 Strings, later released via Island Records (2010) under her artist name, The Lucinda Belle Orchestra; the album featured the artist Andrew Roachford on the track, "Keep on Looking".

Her music has been used in films including For No Good Reason and short films such as Eternal Return and Join my Band.

Belle also made several covers of songs, among them, "Smells Like Teen Spirit", and Cyndi Lauper's "True Colors" for the film, The Lavender Scare.

Under the guidance of Big Life Management, Belle wrote and recorded in 2016 her album Thing Big: Like Me (independently released in 2019) at the retro East London recording studios Toe Rag.

=== Performances ===
Belle sang and played harp at Trevor Horn’s 25th Anniversary at Wembley alongside Yes, Seal, Grace Jones, Frankie Goes to Hollywood, Dollar, The Buggles and The Pet shop Boys. She has also performed live and on studio recordings with Robbie Williams, as well as working with Jamiroquai, Missy Elliott, Natalie Cole, James Blunt, Dua Lipa, Jay-Z and the Bullits, The Petshop Boys, Gregory Porter, Mark Batson and Annie Lennox, among others.

=== Keynote speaker ===
In 2016, Belle began appearing as a Keynote speaker and performer; her appearances include TEDX, EG and MEDx.
