= World Harp Competition =

International harp competition

- Location: Utrecht, Netherlands
- Presented by: 1000 Strings Festival (formerly Dutch Harp Festival)
- First award: 2010; 16 years ago
- Website: https://www.worldharpcompetition.com/

The World Harp Competition is an international harp competition hosted in the Netherlands every two years. The competition is open to all harpists regardless of age, nationality and musical genre.

The finals are held live at the 1000 Strings Festival in the Netherlands. Since 2022 the semifinals are also held in the Netherlands over two days at the beginning of the 1000 Strings Festival.

== History ==
The World Harp Competition was founded in 2010 and originally named the Dutch Harp Competition. It followed the traditional classical format where candidates played from a set repertoire. In 2018 the competition changed its name to World Harp Competition and adopted a unique model in which candidates create their own 45-minute program showcasing not only their technical quality but also their unique style, creativity and ability to connect with their audience.

“Our mission is not to judge who is the best technical player but rather to find the best all-around artist. By giving competitors space to be creative, we hope to get harpists thinking about what makes a compelling performance and how best to connect with their audience", said competition director Elizabeth Jaxon.

== Organizers ==
Elizabeth Jaxon is the director for the World Harp Competition. She is also one of the board member for the Dutch Harp Festival along with Remy van Kesteren, Gert Wijnalda and Paul Hooijmans. Volunteers help to make the event possible by supporting as guides, harp movers, drivers, and roles in the restaurant, ticketing desk and information areas.

== Format and Prizes ==
There are four rounds in the competition: a recorded Preliminary Round, a Video Round, live Semifinals, and live Finals. For the first round, contestants submit an audio recording of them playing a piece of their choice. The recording submissions are made anonymous before the judges listen to them to choose the candidates who are invited to the video round. Up to 14 candidates from the video round are invited to the live semifinals where they will play their full 45-minute programme. Based on the results of the semifinal, three finalists are chosen to present a 15-minute program of their choice.

The 1st, 2nd, and 3rd prizes are awarded by the judges based on the candidate's performances in the semifinals and finals. Members of the public vote for a candidate of their choice to receive the Audience Award. Each of the finalists receives a cash prize, and the 1st place winner receives further support from the Care, Coaching, and Career (CCC) development program.

== Competition winners ==
Year	1st Prize	2nd Prize	3rd Prize	Audience Award	Special Prizes
2026	Veronika Lemishenko, Ukraine	Anna Amigó, Spain	Motoshi Kosako, Japan	María Cristina de la Rosa Peralta, Mexico	
2024	Kevin Le Pennec, France	Amy Nam, USA	Ariel Sol, USA	Kevin Le Pennec, France	
2022	Juanjo Corbalán, Paraguay	Julie Rokseth, Norway	Maria Sá Silva, Portugal	Julie Rokseth, Norway	
2020 / 2021	Uno Alexander Vesje, Norway	Romy Wymer, Netherlands	Grace Roepke, USA	Romy Wymer, Netherlands	4th Prize: Tara Minton, Australia
2018	César Secundino, Mexico	Alice Belugou, France/ Switzerland	Aimee Hang Yu Lam, Hong Kong	César Secundino, Mexico	
2016	Emmanuel Padilla Holguín, Mexico	Jean-Baptiste Haye, France	Giulia Ott, Switzerland	Emmanuel Padilla Holguín, Mexico	
2014	Juliana Myslov, UK	Markus Thalheimer, Germany	Shiho Minami, Japan	Juliana Myslov, UK	
2012	Amandine Carbuccia, France	Sarah Verrue, Belgium	Ruth Bennett, UK/ USA	Amandine Carbuccia, France	Festival Classique Originality Award: Anna Steinkochler, Austria
2010	Noël Wan, USA	Rino Kageyama, Japan	Eleanor Turner, UK	Noël Wan, USA	

== Semifinalists ==
=== 2026 ===
- Anna Amigó (Spain)
- Francesca Campo (Italy)
- Sujata Chapelain (France)
- Cara Dawson (UK)
- María Cristina de la Rosa Peralta (Mexico)
- Anna Dunlap (USA)
- Léna Jallon (France/Switzerland)
- Gabriella Jones (Wales)
- Motoshi Kosako (Japan)
- Veronika Lemishenko (Ukraine)
- Renee Qin (Canada)
- Esther Sévérac (France/Germany)
- Lise Vandersmissen (Belgium)
- Tara Viscardi (Ireland)

=== 2024 ===
- Llywelyn Ifan Jones (UK)
- Kevin Le Pennec (France)
- Ruth Lee (UK)
- Katia Mestrovic (Australia)
- Océane Minder (Switzerland)
- Amy Nam (USA)
- Dafne Paris (Netherlands)
- Fiona Rutherford (UK)
- Ariel Sol Bertulfo Schwartz (USA)
- Alexander Thomas (UK)
- Emma Thomazeau (France)

=== 2022 ===
- Héloïse Carlean-Jones (France)
- Juan Corbalán (Paraguay)
- Cara Dawson (UK/Germany)
- Maria Sá Silva (Portugal)
- Julie Rokseth (Norway)
- Nathania Ko (Canada)

=== 2020 ===
- ?

=== 2018 ===
- Alice Belugou (France/Switzerland)
- Abigail Kent (USA)
- Aimee Hang Yu Lam (Hong Kong/UK)
- Rosanna Moore (UK)
- Pia Salvia (Belgium)
- Cesar Secundino (Mexico)
- Uno Alexander Vesje (Norway)
- Oliver Wass (UK)

=== 2016 ===
- Miriam Ruf (Germany)
- Kana Onishi (Japan)
- Emmanuel Padilla Holguín (Mexico)
- Aurélie Bouchard (France)
- Nick Scholten (Netherlands)
- Giulia Ott (Switzerland)
- Beate Loonstra (Netherlands)
- Jean-Baptiste Haye (France)

== Competition Juries ==
=== 2026 ===
The 2026 jury members were Rachel Newton (Chair), Emmanuel Padilla Holguín, Masumi Nagasawa, Mola Sylla, Bernadeta Astari, and Rembrandt Frerichs. The jury secretary was Christine Krüger.

=== 2024 ===
The 2024 jury members were Catrin Finch (Chair), Brandee Younger, Deborah Henson-Conant, Guido van Oorschot, Joost Neelemans, Martin Fondse, and Maya Fridman.

=== 2022 ===
The 2022 jury members were Gavriel Lipkind (Chair), Jana Boušková, Maryna Krut, Nikolaz Cadoret, Masumi Nagasawa, Sophie Nzayisenga, and Vasile Nedea.

=== 2020/2021 ===
The jury included Ties Mellema (Chair), Anke Klein, Stephan Fitzpatrick, Corrina Hewat, Gavriël Lipkind, Caroline Lizotte, Claron McFadden and Jeroen van Vliet.

=== 2018 ===
The jury in 2018 consisted of Remy van Kesteren, Maeve Gilchrist, and Rob Paterson.
