= Remy van Kesteren =

Dutch harpist (born 1989)

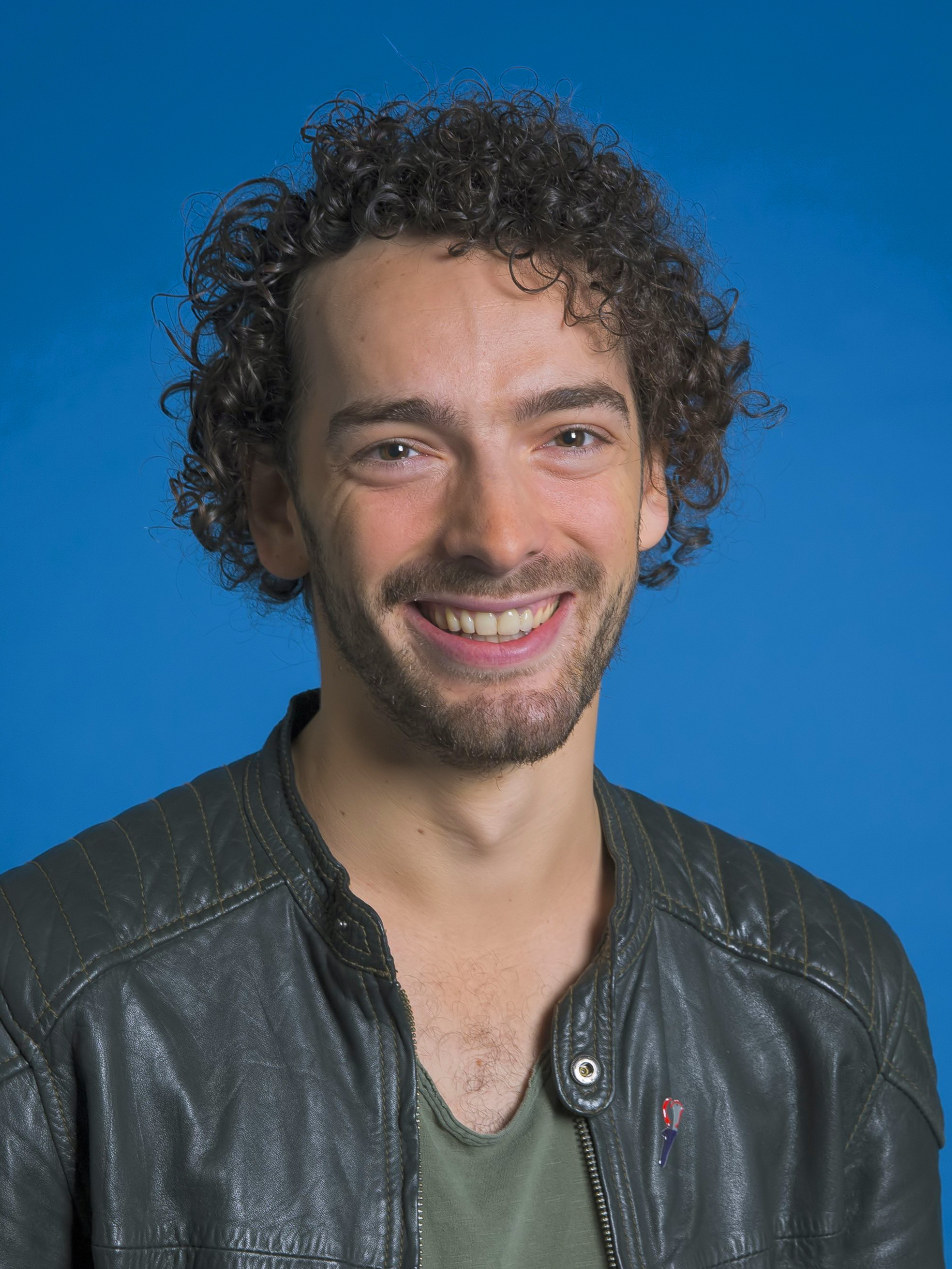
- Remy van Kesteren (2017)

Background information
- Born: 8 March 1989 (age 37); Zeist, Netherlands
- Genres: Classical, pop, indie, alternative
- Occupations: Musician, harpist, composer
- Instrument: Harp
- Years active: 1995–present
- Labels: Deutsche Grammophon, V2, Snowstar Records, DRC Dutch Record Company, Think Big Music
- Website: http://www.remyvankesteren.nl

Remy van Kesteren (8 March 1989) is a Dutch harpist and artistic director of the Dutch Harp Festival.

== Education ==
Remy van Kesteren was admitted to the Utrechts Conservatorium into a class taught by Erika Waardenburg at the age of ten and he graduated with the highest distinction in 2010. He continued his training at the Conservatoire de Paris, where he was inspired by the famous harpist Isabelle Moretti. In 2012 he obtained his master's degree summa cum laude from the Conservatorium van Amsterdam. He took composing lessons from composer Willem Jeths.

== Awards ==
Remy van Kesteren has won several prizes. He is the winner of the Elisabeth Everts Prize, the prize for exceptional young talent in the Netherlands. He won first prizes at Dutch harp competitions and the Prinses Christina Concours.

In 2008 he won third place at the International Harp Competition in Moscow and in 2009 third prize at the prestigious The International Harp Contest in Israel. That year he also won the final of the Stichting Jong Muziektalent Nederland competition, which earned him the title 'Young Music Talent 2009'.

In October 2012 he toured the Netherlands as laureate of Dutch Classical Talent, a promotional project by, among others, the Royal Concertgebouw Orchestra and Radio 4, the final of which took place on April 21, 2013 in the Royal Concertgebouw. In 2013 he won the USA International Harp Competition. In 2013 he also won the Grachtenfestival Prize, which is awarded annually to a young musician or ensemble at the start of an international career. In 2016 he won the Dutch Music Prize, the highest award from the Ministry of Education, Culture and Science for classical musicians.

== Dutch Harp Festival ==
In 2010, Remy van Kesteren founded the Dutch Harp Festival, a festival with concerts focusing on the harp from Dutch and international artists. Alongside this he founded the World Harp Competition, a biannual international harp competition open to harpists from all nationalities, ages and genres.

== Instrument design ==
Remy van Kesteren developed the Réus 49 together with Salvi. The Dutch Musical Instruments Foundation supervised the innovative process and purchased the instrument. The new instrument has 49 instead of 47 strings and can be played both acoustically and electrically amplified. It also has a damping mechanism, allowing you to mute all strings with one movement of the knee. The instrument was presented at the Dutch Harp Festival in 2018.

== Discography ==
Year	Title	Credit
2012	Remy.	Remy van Kesteren
2014	Memento	Remy van Kesteren (arrangements for harp from: Heitor Villa-Lobos, Martin Fondse, Joaquín Rodrigo, Darius Milhaud & Alberto Iglesias)
2016	Tomorrow Eyes	Remy van Kesteren (arrangements for harp from: Martin Fondse, Nils Frahm, Frederico Mompous, Michael Prins & Manuel de Falla)
2019	Shadows	Remy van Kesteren featuring Maarten Vos & Fink
2020	An alternative soundtrack to the motion picture...	Remy van Kesteren
2023	Muses	Remy van Kesteren
2025	Leave What You Know	Remy van Kesteren
