= Luisa Menárguez =

Spanish harpist and educator

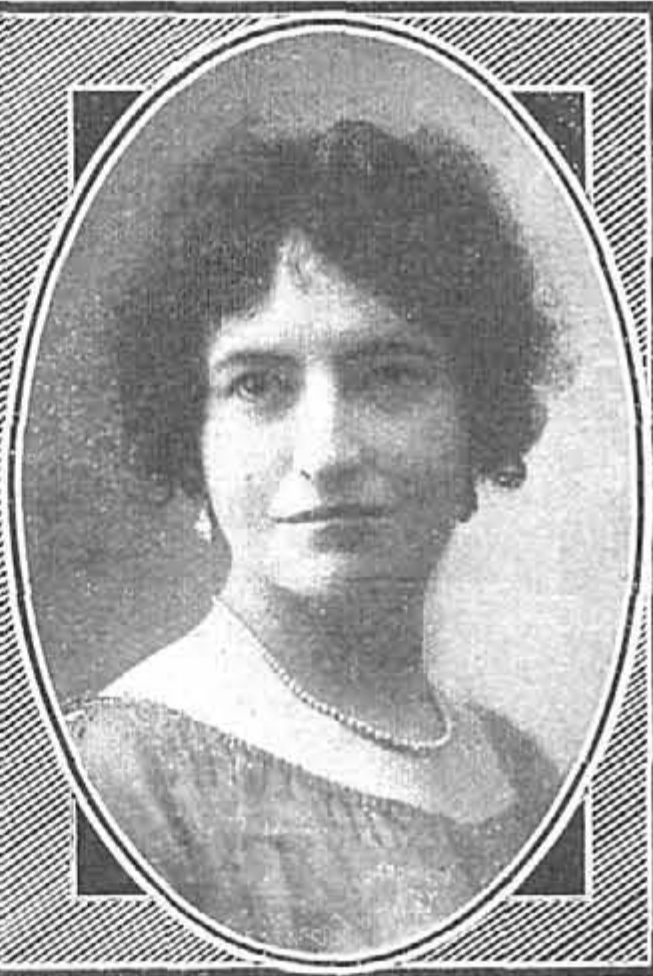

Luisa Menárguez was a Spanish harpist and educator, who taught several of the world's premier harpists of modern times, including her grand-niece, Marisa Robles, Nicanor Zabaleta, and Maria del Milagro Azpiazu. She was a professor of harp at the Madrid Royal Conservatory. Joaquin Rodrigo composed harp music for Menárguez.
