= Diarmuid Ó Dubhagáin =

Irish harper

Diarmuid Ó Dubhagáin (fl. 1603) was an Irish harper.

Captain Francis O'Neill states that Ó Dubhagáin was a renowned harper for Donogh O'Brien, 4th Earl of Thomond and resided at Garrduff, County Limerick. He is listed as receiving a pardon from Elizabeth I, "doubtless the intercession of that powerful nobleman".
