= Marisa Robles =

Spanish harpist and composer

María Luisa Robles Bonilla (born 4 May 1937), known as Marisa Robles, is a Spanish harpist and composer.

She was born in Spain, where she studied the harp with Luisa Menárguez, who was professor of harp at Madrid Conservatory. She graduated from the Madrid Conservatory at the age of sixteen in 1953.

In 1958 she married, and in 1960 she came to live permanently in the UK. In 1971 she became a professor of harp in the Royal College of Music. She has three children, St. John Harvey, Grania Hyde-Smith and Alexander Hyde-Smith.

Robles was artistic director for the first two Cardiff World Harp Festivals in 1991 and 1994.

== Repertoire ==
She made her concert debut at seventeen, performing with flautist Jean-Pierre Rampal. The piece for which she is probably best known is the Concerto for Flute and Harp by Mozart which she has performed with Rampal, James Galway and her second husband Christopher Hyde-Smith among others. In 1963 she premiered Sones en la Giralda on the BBC, a wedding present written for her by Joaquín Rodrigo. In 1981, she wrote the music for a set of audiobooks of the Chronicles of Narnia, narrated by Sir Michael Hordern. This was released as her Narnia Suite in 1981, with Robles playing harp and her husband the flute.
