= Astrid Ydén =

Swedish harpist

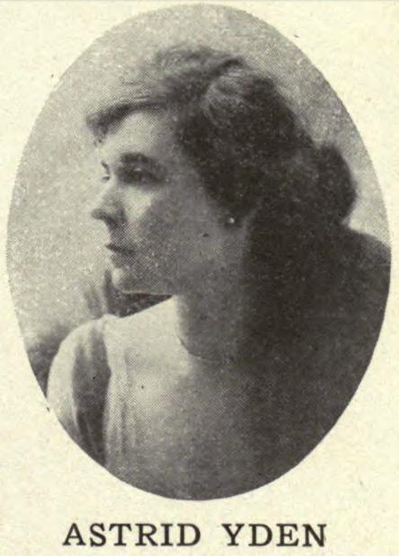
- Born: 1881
- Died: 1963 (aged 81–82)
- Education: Royal College of Music, Stockholm

Astrid Ydén (1881-1963) was a Swedish harpist.

She performed in the Gothenburg Symphony Orchestra from 1909–1912.

Her performances received positive reviews in The Times, The Morning Post, and Svenska Dagbladet, among others.
