= Ursula Burns (musician) =

Irish harpist

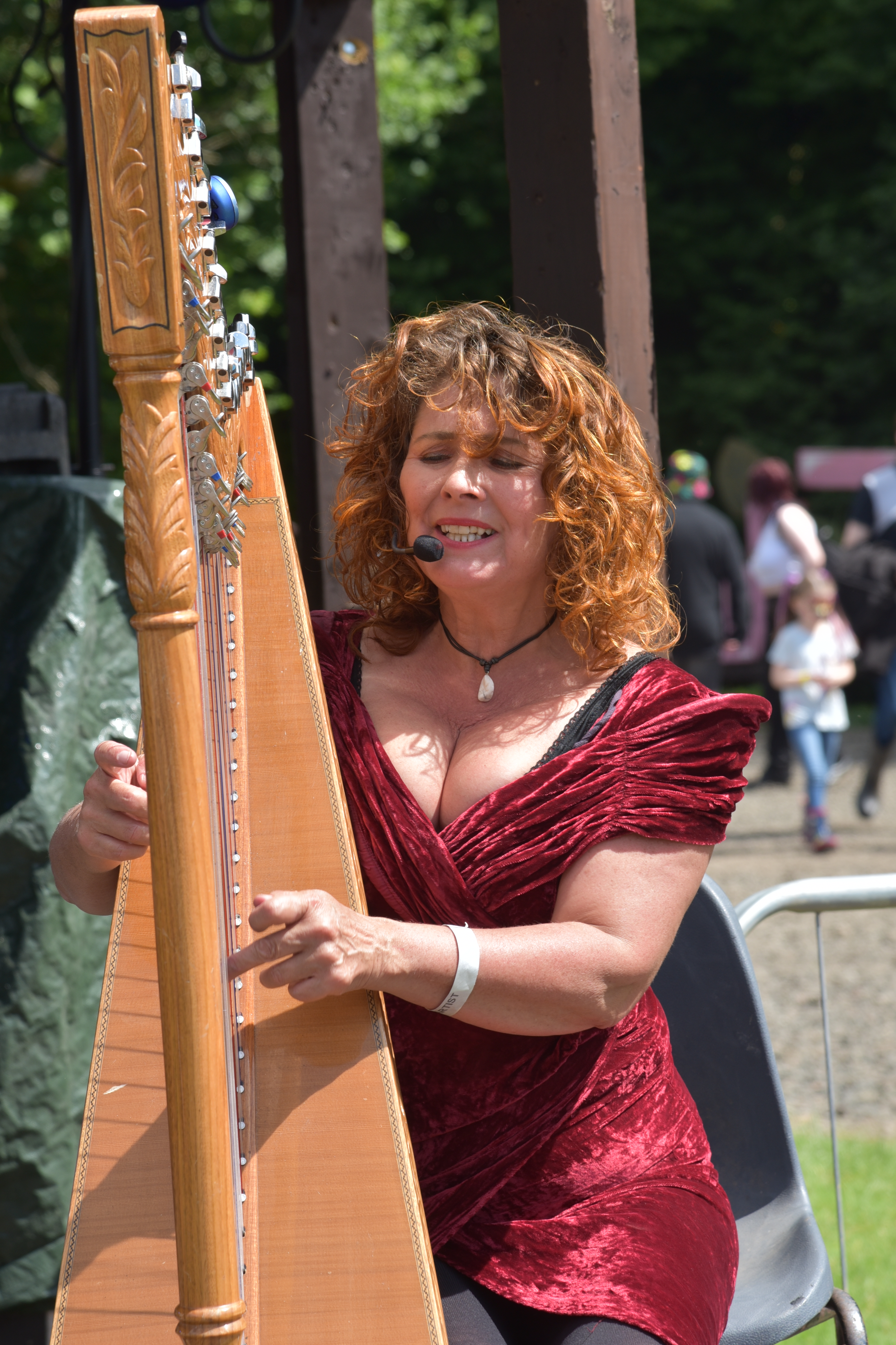
- Ursula Burns in 2023.

Background information
- Origin: Belfast, Northern Ireland, United Kingdom
- Occupations: Harpist, multi-instrumentalist, songwriter, composer and comedienne
- Instruments: Harp, piano, vocals
- Years active: 1997-present
- Website: ursulaburns.co.uk

Ursula Burns is an Irish harpist, multi-instrumentalist (harp, piano, vocals), songwriter, composer and comedienne from Belfast, Northern Ireland. Performing variously as Ursula Burns and under the stage name The Dangerous Harpist, Ursula has toured extensively with her music in Ireland, the UK, Europe, America and Australia, performing in circus, theatre, comedy shows and more classical settings. She has appeared on bills with artists like Beth Orton, The Blue Nile, Lou Reed, and Jackson Browne, and has played solo shows at the Royal Albert Hall.

== Early life and education ==
Ursula Burns was born on the Falls Road, Belfast at the height of the so-called "Troubles". She comes from a family of musicians; her grandfather Charlie O'Neill was a traditional fiddle player from the Bluestack Mountains, Donegal. Her mother, Marie Burns (née O'Neill), is a self-taught harpist who was a member of the Belfast Writers' Group with the late John Hewitt and performed with the Delphic Players. Ursula credits her mother for her musical ability, and her father, Don Burns, who sang "funny songs", for her comedy.

Ursula began performing music and acting in school, earning her first win for under-9 solo piano at primary school and acting in school theatre at St Louise's College, Belfast. She describes falling through the net at school, suffering from severe dyslexia, however, she gained a special entry to the University of Ulster to study theatre.

In 1985, Ursula composed two tracks for her mother's album of W. B. Yeats poetry set to music, An Appointment With W.B. Yeats, created with permission from the Yeats family; this was Ursula's first recording.

== Circus career ==
Having spent her early years on the road with her mother touring folk clubs and medieval banquets, Ursula's daydreaming and discontent with the stark reality of her home town of Belfast prompted her to join Mike Moloney's newly-formed Belfast Community Circus School, going on tour around Northern Ireland in 1984 at the age of 14. Ursula has described the circus as "a real antidote to what was going on at home [in Belfast during the ‘Troubles’]. In those dark times, the circus was a colour and light. You didn’t ask anyone what side they were from, it didn’t matter." Circus would become a re-occurring theme in her life, with her first returning to the art-form with the international award-winning, Irish-based circus company Tumble Circus, and most recently with Circus250, whose Daring Dames is Ireland's first and only all-female travelling circus.

== Musical career ==
In those earlier years, however, Ursula's path took her into the world of theatre and music. She began her working life touring for three years on the road, performing mask work with Bob Frith's Horse and Bamboo, Europe's only remaining horse-drawn theatre company. It was this experience she credits with truly igniting her love of music and desire to make a career of it, and she began to play the harp at the late age of 25. Her mother had bought her a flat-pack Paraguayan harp in a chemist in the Falls Road, and Ursula, who had resisted following in the traditional family footsteps, discovered that "the harp just gelled with [her] and [she] could learn it really quickly." At that time, she embarked on self-employment in music and found that her relationship to music changed. "When you are earning a living, it is harder to do it for pleasure. I enjoy my work. I love my work, and I keep it diverse to keep it spicy. I am an entertainer and all my income is live, so it is not just about the musical quality. To play comedy on the harp, I needed to master the harp. And yet, ‘quality’ harping is not my aim. Connection with the audience is."

Ursula's first manager was Johnny Quinn, who went on to find fame as a member of Snow Patrol. Following his departure, she was taken on by Ross Graham of FreeRange Records. She released her first record, the Sinister Nips EP, in 1997, and followed it up with her debut album, According To Ursula Burns, in 1998. Writing for Irish music and politics magazine, Hot Press, Stuart Bailie described Ursula's music thus: "Think of Mary Coughlan crooning Berliner cabaret in a post-grunge landscape. Imagine the archetypal spark of a Tori Amos lyric, only with an Ulster dimension and a harp revealing all manner of associations".

=== Jimmy Nail Tour ===
According to Duke Special, on a press trip to Belfast, Jimmy Nail "heard Ursula on the radio, loved the song and asked her to come out on tour with him." He muses on a somewhat wasted opportunity, "But because of a labour strike at the record manufacturing plant used by her label, Ursula wasn’t able to get discs done up to sell on the tour, so she was never able to really capitalise on that big break." Ursula recounts that "Jimmy Nail heard me on Women’s Hour, and it took him six weeks to find me. He asked me to come on a 50-date On the Boards tour, playing to 3,000 people a night and ending in the Albert Hall."

Over the following 30 years, Ursula wrote and released a plethora of tracks and albums and continued to perform in multiple showcases, venues, and festivals, including Glastonbury Festival, Electric Picnic, the Belfast Festival, and many more. In 2018, she was invited to perform an interpretation of a track from Van Morrison's Astral Weeks for a special BBC Radio Ulster show, 50 Years of Astral Weeks. She chose Madame George, playing her reworking of the classic on the harp.

Ursula's latest album, The Secret Melodies of Trees, was the first album of a very long career entirely composed of her own harp instrumentals. The album was conceived after she was invited to Asunción to take part in a harp festival. She was inspired by what she heard there, observing musical features of the Paraguayan style such as a very short attack, lots of notes, and a very rhythmic and flamboyant way of playing and found the musicians' joyful approach to playing, and their audience's exuberance, energising. She returned home and spent the winter playing for four hours a day.

Wanting to do something special to mark the anniversary of 30 years of playing, Ursula had the idea of documenting her organically-evolved style, technique and compositions, just as Edward Bunting did for the 1792 Belfast Harpers Assembly (alternately known as the Belfast Harp Festival), to document hundreds of years of harpers and their tunes. She began writing her new album, citing as inspiration specific reference points such as the birdsong she had heard when staying in the castle of Eliza Lynch (Cork-born mistress of second president of Paraguay, Francisco Solano López), which she turned into a motif in El Jardín de Eliza Lynch, or awakening from a nap in the castle gardens to the sight of falling jacaranda blossoms, captured in Dreaming in Violet as Jacaranda Petals Fall. The album is a mix of Paraguayan sights and sounds and musings on landscapes closer to home (A Wish on the Road to Coleraine, Night Circus at Bog Meadows), coupled with lamentation about environmental failures in Northern Ireland (Where the Sycamore Used to Be).

The album was recorded in early 2024 in Redbox Studios, Belfast, by renowned musician Dónal O’Connor, who also contributed fiddle, keys, bass, vocals and percussion. John McSherry, champion piper and whistle-player and founder of world-class Irish trad groups such as Lúnasa, Tamalin, Ulaid and At First Light (the latter two with Dónal), added uilleann pipes and whistles. The Secret Melodies of Trees was released on the 11th October 2024.

== Theatre career ==
=== Musical Director / Composer, Cahoots NI Theatre Company, Belfast ===
Ursula first composed with award-winning children's theatre company Cahoots NI in 2007 with The Flea Pit, a show performed in a 15-capacity miniature theatre made from a converted horsebox. This began a long-running collaboration on tours and shows which included:

- The Flea Pit
- The Snail and the Whale
- The Family Hoffman's Mystery Palace
- Leon and the Place Between
- The Assistant's Revenge.

=== Composer / Performer, Lyric Theatre, Belfast ===
- Little Red Riding Hood and The Big Bad Wolf
- The Gingerbread Mix-Up

=== Composer / Performer, Kabosh Theatre ===
- Mabel
- Inventors for the Balmoral Show

== Comedy career ==
=== Irish Music Comedy Awards ===
Ursula has described herself as having fallen into comedy in 2012, when a Belfast filmmaker Stephen Mullen included one of her YouTube videos in a comedy call-out. She said he suggested she forward it to the Irish Music Comedy Awards, which she'd never heard of. The deadline being the next day, she wasn't able to apply in time, but someone else nominated her and she was then invited by the IMCA to perform in the finals in Dublin. She won, with only two comedy songs under her belt, but wrote a one-hour show in the following month. Suddenly being invited to perform in comedy festivals, such as the Kerry Comedy Festival, Ursula found the comedy circuit "really difficult", "quite rough", saying she was a fish out of water.

=== Edinburgh Fringe ===
However, since people kept recommending she take her show to the Edinburgh Festival Fringe, in 2013, she applied for a grant from the Arts Council of Northern Ireland to finance a show. She was notified of the successful award too late to join the festival programme, so traveled to Edinburgh as an unbilled act. Scotsman journalist Claire Smith met Ursula on the way in to the latter's show, and suggested to writer, producer and creator of the Fringe's Malcolm Hardee Awards, John Fleming, that he might enjoy it and should go see it. John did go and reported that he did indeed enjoy it, interviewing Ursula for his blog. She was nominated that year for the Malcolm Hardee Award for Comic Originality, and later performed in 2016's The Increasingly Prestigious Malcolm Hardee Awards Show, which won the TV BOMB website’s 2016 Edinburgh Fringe Experience Award. In the interim, she returned to the Fringe in 2014 with Get Divorced and Join the Circus, in 2016, with Ursula Burns: The Dangerous Harpist, and in 2022 with The Trucking Harpist Show, earning positive reviews for her quirky shows ("Funny and enchanting in equal measure, with a lilting voice that makes the Falls Road sound like Brigadoon" - The Scotsman's Kate Copstick).

In 2016, Ursula performed her comedy act for the Northern Ireland performance of BBC Radio 4's State of the Nation programme, broadcast from the Empire Music Hall, Belfast.

=== Britain's Got Talent ===
In 2019, Ursula entered and reached the semi-finals of Simon Cowell's British variety TV show, Britain's Got Talent. She had previously spoken about turning down invitations to audition for the show, telling the Irish Independent's Aoife Kelly in 2018 that she had turned it down every year for five years as she felt she'd been "doing this too long to go on and have someone tell me, ‘Oh you’re not good’ and then a tap dancing dog wins it". Ursula, who has said she has never owned a TV, added at the time "I’m a mother and it’s just not my focus. It’s just not where I’m at or what interests me. I have enough gigs to keep my car and house going and child at school and I’m not after that type of mainstream thing."

However, in a more recent blog post about her experience, she explained that she was ultimately lured by the promise of playing the London Palladium, as she used to work in a Pizza Express across the road and dreamed of playing there, and so she finally accepted. Initially, she said, her four "yes" votes and a standing ovation for her own material was a "buzz", which soon turned to panic attacks after the show aired and she was shamed, as she puts it, in The Sun. Ursula described the panic of having no guidance, trying to retreat, not being able to play her own material as the show progressed, and not knowing how to get out of the contracts she had signed. She said, "I needed counselling...The first blot in my copybook of a 27-year career. People still call me crazy!", and added that it took years to recover from sitting alone reading the hate on Twitter, claiming that the "traumatic" experience left her unable to write for a while following her appearance. At the time, she received support from her early Fringe champion, John Fleming, who penned an article on his website praising her talent and decrying the "blandifying" strictures of the show, republishing an excerpt from his interview with Ursula following her first Fringe performance, in 2013.

In 2024, for the Imagine Festival of Ideas and Politics, Ursula penned a show about what got lost in Ireland's harping history, examining censorship in the arts. In this show, she draws parallels between what Ireland experienced in the 1600s, when Queen Elizabeth I reportedly decreed "Hang the harpers," and the modern day. She reflects on how censorship was impacting her own work as The Dangerous Harpist. This one-woman show, How Many Bardic Harpers Does it Take to Change a Lightbulb? sold out, encouraging her to take it on tour across Ireland.

== Custom-built mobile venues ==
=== The Tardis Imaginarium ===
In the 2010s, Ursula re-purposed a Fiat Doblo to create a mobile stage for performing at festivals and other open-air venues, calling it the Tardis Imaginarium. After many tours and performances, on one journey, the steering jammed and a recovery truck came to pick it up; the van got crushed and Ursula had to start sourcing an alternative.

=== Harpula's Pandorium & The Cloud Truck Theatre ===
Having explored options such as ice-cream vans, military vehicles, old buses and farm machinery, an online search led her to the ideal vehicle for her needs; the Suzuki Carry, a small truck with a flatbed rear and a small engine. She bought her new mobile stage from a dealer in Wigan, and named it Harpula’s Pandorium, "the antidote to the pandemic". She had it customised by Belfast artist and inventor, Paddy Bloomer, who gave it a curved roof which opens outwards and upwards to form a stage roof, and had it painted by artist friend, Belfast street artist Eoin McGinn. She later rebranded the mobile stage as The Cloud Truck Theatre.

== Television ==
In the late 1990s, Ursula performed on the very first episode of BBC Northern Ireland's Across The Line, a Northern Irish music programme presented by musician and DJ Mike Edgar in the BBC Blackstaff Studios in Belfast. In 2019, Ursula auditioned reached the semi-finals of Britain's Got Talent Series 13.

== Awards ==
- 2012 - Winner, inaugural Irish Music Comedy Awards
- 2013 - Nominee, Malcolm Hardee Award for Comic Originality
- 2016 - Honourable Mention, Comedy/Novelty category of the International Songwriting Competition
- 2023 - Winner, Everywoman Global TV Award for Outstanding Innovative Harpist of the Year

== Discography ==
=== EPs ===
- Sinister Nips, 1997

=== Albums ===
- According to Ursula Burns, 1998
- SPELL, 1999
- Rollercoaster Castaways, 2003
- Deep in the Dreaming, 2006
- The Dangerous Harpist, 2016
- Tidal Timelines, 2020
- The Secret Melodies of Trees, 2024

=== As contributor ===
- An Appointment With W.B. Yeats (Marie O'Neill), 1988
- Unfit the Picture (Victoria Geelan), 2014
- Charm (Maria Doyle Kennedy), 2001

== Book contributions ==
Ursula features alongside compatriot musicians Iain Archer, Tim Wheeler and Joby Fox in Stuart Bailie's 2018 Trouble Songs: Music and Conflict in Northern Ireland, exploring how each musician dealt with the trauma of the Troubles in post-ceasefire Northern Ireland.

In 2023, Carol Azams included Ursula's story of her lockdown experience in her book, 100 Empowered Voices: Stories of Covid-19 Lockdown Volume 3.
