= Therese Schroeder-Sheker =

- Instrument: Harp

Therese Schroeder-Sheker is a musician, educator, clinician, and academic dean of the School of Music-Thanatology, which was housed at St. Patrick Hospital in Missoula, Montana from 1992 to 2002.

Schroeder-Sheker, using voice and harp, works as a music-thanatologist, a relatively new discipline, where the practitioner works with those who are actively dying (24–48 hours) or have received a terminal diagnosis with a life expectancy of less than six months. The goals of music-thanatology include reduction of physical as well as emotional pain, creation of a supportive environment while dying, helping the patient become more conscious of their own death process, and changing the approach to death within established structures (hospices, hospitals, etc.). Schroeder-Sheker was honored by the New York Open Center in 1997 for her Music Thanatology. Her music has been used in documentaries and released commercially.

== CD and Video ==
Schroeder-Sheker has produced numerous recorded works. Among those works are:

- Celebrant: The Historical Harp, (cassette tape), Lady Reason Records. (1984)
- The Queen's Minstrel, (CD) Windham Hill Records. (1988), Valley Entertainment. (2011)
- Rosa Mystica, Celestial Harmonies (1989)
- In Dulci Jubilo (Sweet Joy) Celestial Harmonies (1991)
- Inside the Miracle: Enduring Illness, Approaching Wholeness, spoken words by Mark Nepo. Parabola AudioTapes (1996)
- Chalice of Repose: A Contemplative Musician's Approach to Death and Dying. videotape, 1997 (Palm Springs International Film Festival first place award).
- Therese Schroeder-Sheker and The Chalice of Repose Project: A Contemplative Musician's Approach to Death and Dying, DVD, Pleroma Press, 2007.
