= Christopher Hyde-Smith =

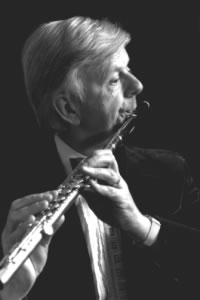

Background information
- Born: Christopher Hyde-Smith; 11 March 1935
- Died: 25 February 2024 (aged 88)
- Genres: Classical
- Occupations: Royal College of Music Professor, Orchestral, soloist Retired
- Instrument: Flute
- Years active: 1960s–2024
- Formerly of: Berlin Philharmonic Orchestra; Royal Philharmonic Orchestra; BBC Concert Orchestra; London Symphony Orchestra; London Mozart Players; Philharmonia Orchestra

Christopher Hyde-Smith (11 March 1935 – 25 February 2024) was a British flautist.

Christopher Hyde-Smith's flute playing has been compared in The Guardian to Sir Laurence Olivier's acting in variety of expression, characterization and style. He has played all over the British Isles and at many festivals including Aldeburgh, the Three Choirs Festival, North Wales and York. He has made many trips abroad appearing as soloist in France, Germany, the Netherlands, Italy, Portugal, Scandinavia, Spain and Switzerland as well as North and South America. He has also visited Russia in an ensemble directed by Benjamin Britten. He has performed with Pablo Casals, Francis Poulenc, Paul Tortelier and Igor Stravinsky.

Hyde-Smith has played the Cimarosa Concerto for Two Flutes with James Galway at the Royal Festival Hall and as concerto soloist he has frequently appeared with the London Mozart Players and also with the London Symphony Orchestra, Royal Philharmonic Orchestra, Royal Liverpool Philharmonic, BBC Concert Orchestra, Scottish and Welsh Orchestras, Philomusica and Northern Sinfonia. William Alwyn, Stephen Dodgson, Joseph Horowitz, William Mathias, John Metcalf and Alan Rawsthorne have written and dedicated works to him.

Hyde-Smith was a professor of flute at the Royal College of Music, where he also studied. He became a Fellow of the Royal College of Music in 1985. He was the founding chairman of the British Flute Society. He played on a golden flute.

Harpist Marisa Robles and Hyde-Smith were married in 1968, later divorced. They had two children.

Jane Hyde-Smith (née Jane Dodd) and Christopher were married in 1985 and have two daughters, the younger of whom is cellist Abigail Hyde-Smith. Hyde-Smith died on 25 February 2024, at the age of 88.
