= Kevin Le Pennec =

French harpist

Kevin le Pennec
- Born: November, 3rd, 1993; Brest, France
- Occupations: Harpist, singer-songwriter
- Instrument: Harp
- Website: https://www.kevinlepennec.com/ (in French)

Kevin le Pennec is a French harpist and singer-songwriter. He won the Camac Trophy at the Inter-Celtic Festival of Lorient in 2019, and First Prize at the World Harp Competition in 2024.

== Education ==
Kevin le Pennec started playing the harp at the age of 7. He obtained his Diplôme National Supérieur Professionnel du Musicien (DNSPM) (equivalent to a Bachelor of Music) from Pôle d'Enseignement Supérieur du Spectacle Vivant in Rennes in 2021 and his DE in 2022.

== Awards ==
Year	Competition	Result	Ref.
2024	World Harp Competition	1st Prize	
2024	World Harp Competition	Audience Award	
2019	Inter-Celtic Festival of Lorient	Camac Trophy	

== Discography ==
Year	Album	Credit
2026	Coming Out	Kevin Le Pennec
2025	Les Irlandais de Bretagne. Histoire d'une migration	V. Bourjot, B. Favrau, S. Hamelin, K. Le Pennec
2024	Les beaux reflets	La Mezanj
2023	À distance	Kevin le Pennec
2021	Bisiad	Morgane Grégory and Kevin le Pennec
