= Monika Stadler =

Austrian harpist and composer

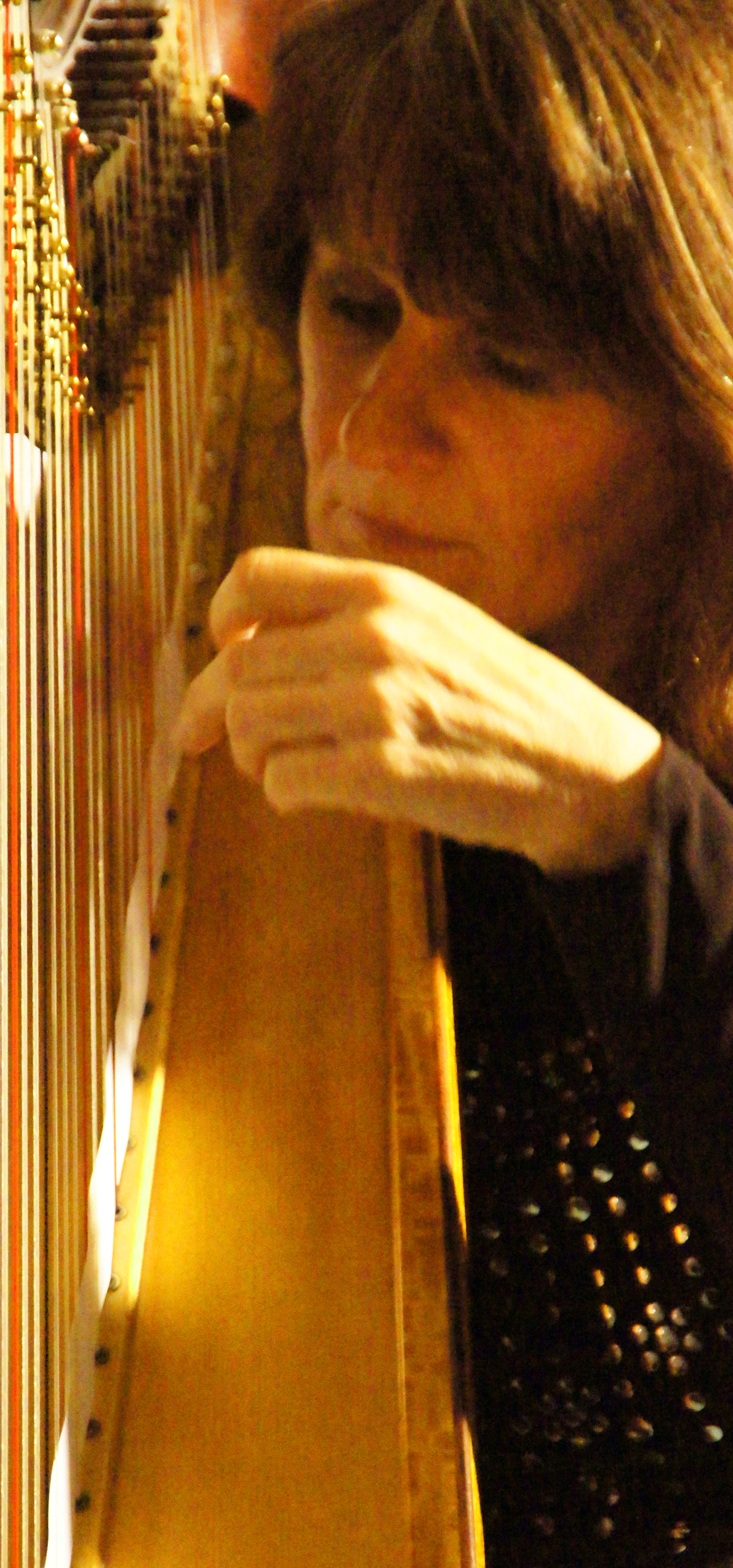
Monika Stadler, 2013.

Monika Stadler (born 19 February 1963, Linz) is an Austrian harpist and composer.

== Education ==
At the age of 13, Monika Stadler began to learn the Austrian folk harp, but very soon changed to the concert harp at the Bruckner-Conservatory, Linz. In 1982, she studied concert harp at the University of Music and Performing Arts, Vienna. During her studies, she played with the Vienna Symphony Orchestra, the orchestra of the Vienna State Opera, and she was also a member of the Corinthian Summer Music Festival Ensemble. In 1990, she graduated with the highest honours. In 1991/92, she continued her studies as a post-graduate in the USA. Her teachers included Deborah Henson-Conant and David Darling.

== Career ==
Since 1993 Stadler has toured mainly with her own projects in Europe, North America, North Africa and the Far East. She has been invited to perform at leading harp festivals, including the Edinburgh International Harp Festival, Lyon & Healy International Jazz & Pop Harpfest, and European Harp Symposium. She also teaches jazz and improvisation workshops for harpists worldwide. In 2010, she became a guest professor at the Guildhall School of Music and Drama in London, UK.

Her published compositions include "Coming Home," "New Shoots, Old Roots," and "Spirit of Harp."

RadioKulturhaus wrote, 'Internationally recognized harpist Monika Stadler brings a breath of fresh air and new dimensions to the world of harp music with her compositions, in which she combines elements of jazz, classical, world, folk and improvisational music to form her very own personal musical signature. It is her constant goal to expand the techniques of harp playing as well as to plumb the depths of the soul. In her own ingenious way, Monika Stadler combines the highest musical aspirations with technical brilliance."

== Discography ==
- Away For A While (2017) EX 937
- Scandinavia (2013) EX 905-2
- Away for a while (2012) EX 937-2
- New Shoots - Old Roots (2010)
- Two Ways remastered (2007) EX 605-2
- Between Earth, Sea & Sky (2007) EX 737-2
- My imaginary Garden (2005) EX 673-2
- Everything will be allright (2002) EX 537-2
- Song for the Earth (2000) EX 437-2
- On the Water (1997)
- Another World - Solo Harp (1995) EX 237-2
- Two Ways (1993)
- Diary from Within (2021)
