= Petra van der Heide =

Dutch harpist

Petra van der Heide (born 1971) is a Dutch harpist.

== Biography ==
Petra van der Heide studied with Erika Waardenburg in Utrecht, Maria Graf in Hamburg and Charlotte Cassedanne-Yoran in Berlin. In addition, she has participated in masterclasses with Susann McDonald and Tanya Tauer. In 1987, at the age of 16, she played in the 'Focus on Youth Concerts' during the 3rd World Harp Congress in Vienna and in subsequent years, won several prizes in national and international competitions.

During the time she lived in Germany (between 1993 and 2003) she played in many of the major German orchestras such as the Gewandhaus Orchester Leipzig, Bamberger Symphoniker and the (Bavarian Radio Orchestra), Munich. She also held the post of solo harpist in the Darmstadt Opera for 5 years, before ultimately returning to Holland.

She has been the principal harpist of the Royal Concertgebouw Orchestra, Amsterdam since 2003, and has worked with conductors such as Mariss Jansons, Riccardo Chailly, Bernard Haitink, Lorin Maazel, Nicolaus Harnoncourt and Zubin Mehta.

Also active in the field of chamber music, she has given concerts in many combinations of instruments; for example Brass and Harp, Harp with Strings and Voices, and Harp with Woodwinds. She always tries to encourage composers to write new works for harp and has played in several different Festivals for modern music in Germany, like Donaueschingen and Darmstadt (Ferienkurse für neue Musik).

She has been a teacher at the conservatory of Amsterdam, and now gives special training in orchestral auditions all around the world.

Van der Heide lives in Amsterdam, the Netherlands.

=== Discography ===
- Hans Gál – ; Music for and with Mandoline. Badisches Zupforchester – Volker Gerland

Recording: 2001, Gaggenau (Germany)
