= Maria Korchinska =

Russian harpist (1895–1979)

Maria Korchinska Мария Корчинская
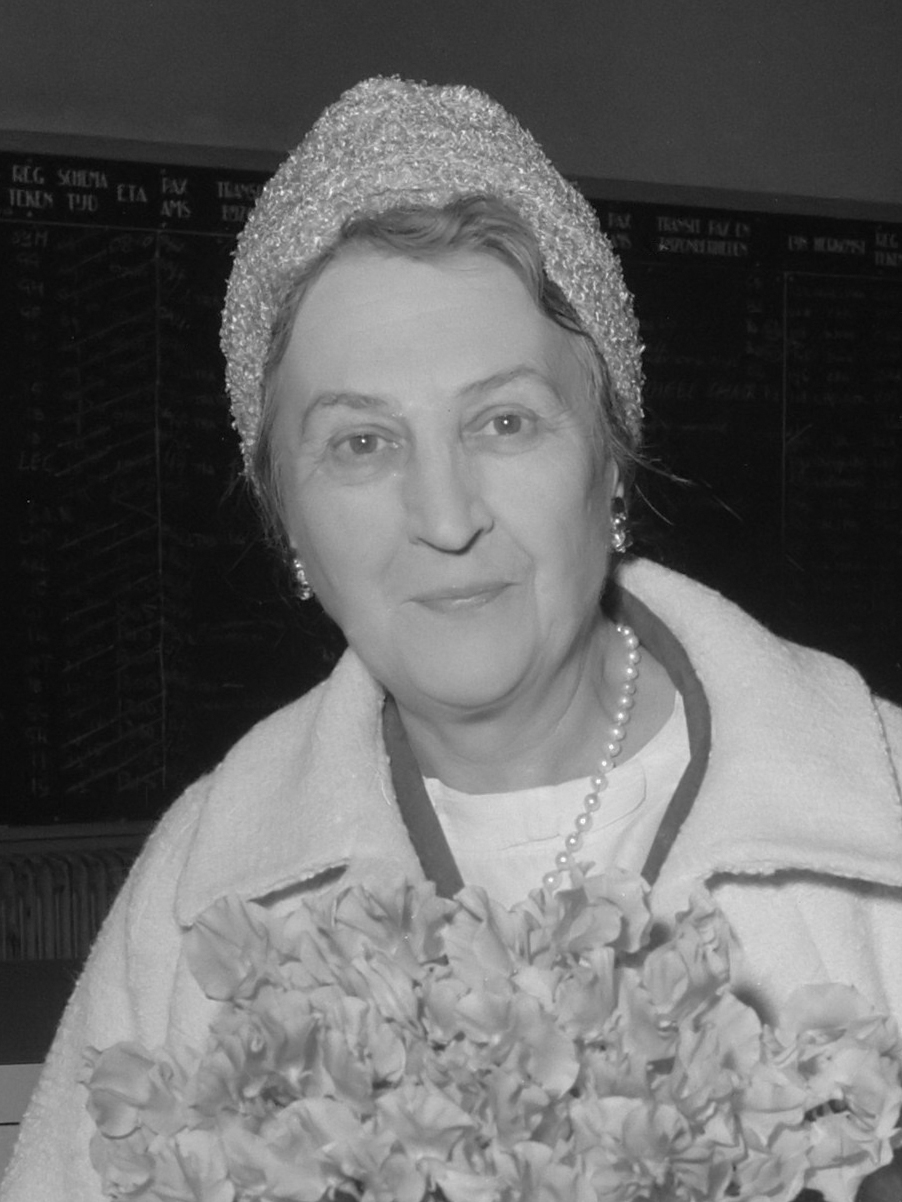
- Korchinska in 1960

Background information
- Born: February 16, 1895; Moscow, Russia
- Died: April 17, 1979 (aged 84) London, England
- Instrument: Harp
- Spouse: Count Constantine Benckendorff

Maria Korchinska (Russian: Мария Корчинская, romanized: Mariya Korchinskaya; 16 February 1895 – 17 April 1979) was a Russian harpist and one of the leading 20th-century harpists in Great Britain.

== Early life ==
Korchinska entered the Moscow Conservatory to study both piano and harp in 1903 but on the advice of her father decided to concentrate on the harp from 1907 on. Her father believed that Russia was entering a time of great change and that given the relatively high number of pianists in Russia it would be easier for his daughter to find work as a harpist than as a pianist. In 1911 she won the first Gold Medal given to a harpist by the Moscow Conservatory.

== Career ==
In 1919 she became the Professor of Harp at the Conservatory as well as the Principal Harpist at the Bolshoi Orchestra. Korchinska was a founding member of the Persimfans, the famous "Orchestra without a conductor". She was one of the many musicians who played at Vladimir Lenin's funeral.

In Great Britain, Korchinska founded the UK Harp Association and had a successful career as a soloist and ensemble player. She was the first harpist to play at the Glyndebourne Festival Opera, was a founding member of the Wigmore Ensemble and was the first British judge at the Israeli Harp competition. Her son Alexander was born in England in July 1926. Bax's Fantasy Sonata for Harp was dedicated to her and she gave the first performance in 1927. Her portrait was taken by Norman Parkinson in 1953 and is now part of the National Portrait Gallery's collection.

She performed in the premieres of several Benjamin Britten works including the Festival of Carols. During World War II she traveled ceaselessly throughout the country to play. In her 1969 BBC interview "Studio Portrait" she said:

"I played .... underground in caves near Lewes, where a piano could not survive the damp. I played in cathedrals and clubs and YMCAs and several times in secret camps and aerodromes, without having the faintest idea of where I was. My life was spent in the black-out trying to find my way. I was lucky I never missed one engagement in spite of all the difficulties in transporting the harp. Several times I was given up, but arrived with my instrument at the last moment, very hot and scared because of the bombing, but able to play."

Korchinska also founded Harp Week in the Netherlands (now known as the World Harp Congress) alongside Phia Berghout. She practised three hours every day until her death in 1979. Favourite pieces included the A Ceremony of Carols by Britten and Danse Sacrée by Debussy. She taught Karen Vaughan, currently Head of Harp at the Royal Academy of Music in London.

== Personal life ==
In 1922 Korchinska married Count Constantine Benckendorff (the son of Count Alexander Konstantinovich Benckendorff). Her daughter Nathalie was born in Moscow in September 1923, and in 1946, she married the British art historian Humphrey Brooke.

The Russian Civil War had seen the confiscation of her husband's estate and conditions were extremely difficult. Korchinska had to carry her father's body to his funeral. In 1924 the family decided to leave Russia for Great Britain, taking with them two Lyon & Healy harps. One of these had been purchased in exchange for a bag of salt.

== Sources ==
- Nineteenth- And Twentieth-Century Harpists: A Bio-Critical Sourcebook - Wenonah Milton Govea - Google Books pp. 145–150.
- Raymond Leppard on Music: Anthology of Critical and Autobiographical Writings – Raymond Leppard – Google Books p. 85.
- Gramophone – Google Books
- All Music Guide to Classical Music: The Definitive Guide to Classical Music – Google Books
- Music and Musicians – Google Books
