= Nicanor Zabaleta =

Spanish harpist

N. Zabaleta

Nicanor Zabaleta Zala (January 7, 1907 – April 1, 1993) was a Spanish harpist.

Zabaleta was born in San Sebastián, Spain, on January 7, 1907. In 1914 his father, an amateur musician, bought him a harp in an antique shop. He soon began taking lessons from Vincenta Tormo de Calvo (Madrid Conservatory faculty) and Luisa Menarguez. In 1925 he began studies in Paris, where his teachers were Marcel Tournier and Jacqueline Borot. In 1926, in Paris, he made his own official concert debut. Then he travelled to the U.S. and there, on July 5, 1934, he made his North America debut in New York City. At a concert in Puerto Rico in 1950 he met Graziela and they were married in 1952. They relocated to Spain and Zabaleta began touring Europe. During the years of 1959–1962 he led a harp class on Accademia Musicale Chigiana courses in Siena.

He performed mainly music of the 18th century, and also ancient and modern music. People who composed for him include Alberto Ginastera, Darius Milhaud, Germaine Tailleferre, Xavier Montsalvatge, Heitor Villa-Lobos, Walter Piston, Ernst Krenek, Joaquín Rodrigo. Josef Tal's Concerto for Harp and Electronics was commissioned by Zabaleta in 1971, and premiered by him in Munich the same year. It is estimated that Zabaleta sold nearly three million records.

He was awarded the Premio Nacional de Música of Spain in 1982 and six years later, in 1988, he was elected to the Real Academia de Bellas Artes de San Fernando.

Zabaleta's final concert on June 16, 1992, in Madrid was given when his health was already declining. He died on April 1, 1993, in San Juan, Puerto Rico.

== Recordings ==
- Harfe (Harp). Ravel, Debussy, Handel, Albrechtsberger. Paul Kuentz Chamber Orchestra. DGG LP 139 304. 1967.
- Johann Sebastian Bach. Partita #2 in D minor BWV 1004, Suite #3 in B minor BWV 814, Partie A major BWV 832. Deutsche Grammophon 12" vinyl: 2530 333. 1973
- Handel, Bach, Mozart, Dittersdorf, Krumpholtz, Wagenseil, Boieldieu: various harp works, Deutsche Grammophon CD 413 684-2
- Camille Saint-Saëns: Morceau de concert G-dur op. 154. ... Germaine Tailliferre: Concertino pour Harpe et Orchestre.... Alberto Ginastera: Concierto para harpa y Orquestra. Nicanor Zabaleta & Jean Martinon. DEUTSCHE GRAMMOPHON 2530 008. LP
- Ravel. Introduction & Allegro (with Berlin RSO cond. Fricsay). Deutsche Grammophon 10" vinyl: DG 17135.
