= Ruth Berman Harris (harpist) =

Ruth Berman-Harris
- Born: November 3, 1916; New Haven, Connecticut, United States
- Died: April 23, 2013 (aged 96) Peoria, Arizona, United States
- Genres: Jazz, classical
- Occupations: Musician, composer, arranger, educator
- Instrument: Harp

Ruth Berman-Harris (November 3, 1916 – April 23, 2013) was an American concert harpist, recording artist, and music educator. She performed for many years in New York in the jazz and classical fields, and authored eight books for harp students.

Born in New Haven, Connecticut, Ruth Berman began her harp studies at the age of thirteen. At age fifteen she won the Madrigal Award at the Juilliard School. She studied under Carlos Salzedo, Marie Miller, Lucille Lawrence, Casper Reardon, and Ronald Herder. She married Sydney I. Harris, on October 6, 1946, and thereafter was professionally known as Ruth Berman-Harris.

As one of few harpists in New York who played both classical and jazz, Berman-Harris wrote her own jazz arrangements, while performing with symphony orchestras and working as a studio musician at NBC, CBS and ABC for forty-eight years. She performed with Arturo Toscanini and the NBC Symphony.

Her jazz harp recordings were remastered, using materials from the Library of Congress, on a 2008 CD entitled Swing Time, issued by MSR Classic and Jazz Recording Company.

Harris served on the faculty of the Hoff-Barthelson Music School and the Westchester Conservatory of Music. She co-directed the Purchase Music Ensemble, which sponsored the Aaron Copland Competition for Young Composers.

In September 1978 Berman appeared at a benefit concert hosted by the Connecticut chapter of the American Harp Society, where she and cellist Lisa Bressler performed original compositions for harp and cello by Berman.

Berman-Harris died on April 23, 2013, at the age of 96, at the Hospice of Arizona, in Peoria, Arizona.

== Compositions and arrangements ==
Ms. Berman-Harris' publications include: Miniatures I for lever harp, Miniatures I for pedal harp, (Miniatures I Table of Contents: Excerpt from "En Bateau" (Debussy), Theme From Chopin Waltz, Theme From Chopin Etude, Debby's Waltz, Spring, Ode To Brandoria, Theme From Lucia Di Lammermoor), Miniatures III for cello and harp (this collection contains three original intermediate to upper-intermediate-level pieces for pedal harp; the pieces are fairly showy, using glissandos, many arpeggios, harmonics and rolled chords; songs can be played separately or in one unit as a concert piece lasting approximately 8 1/2 minutes; the cello part is significantly challenging; also available separately as harp solo), Miniatures III for solo pedal harp, and Prayer for Voice and Harp, as well as concert versions of Oh Holy Night arranged for both lever and pedal harp.
