= Ruth Acuff =

American singer-songwriter

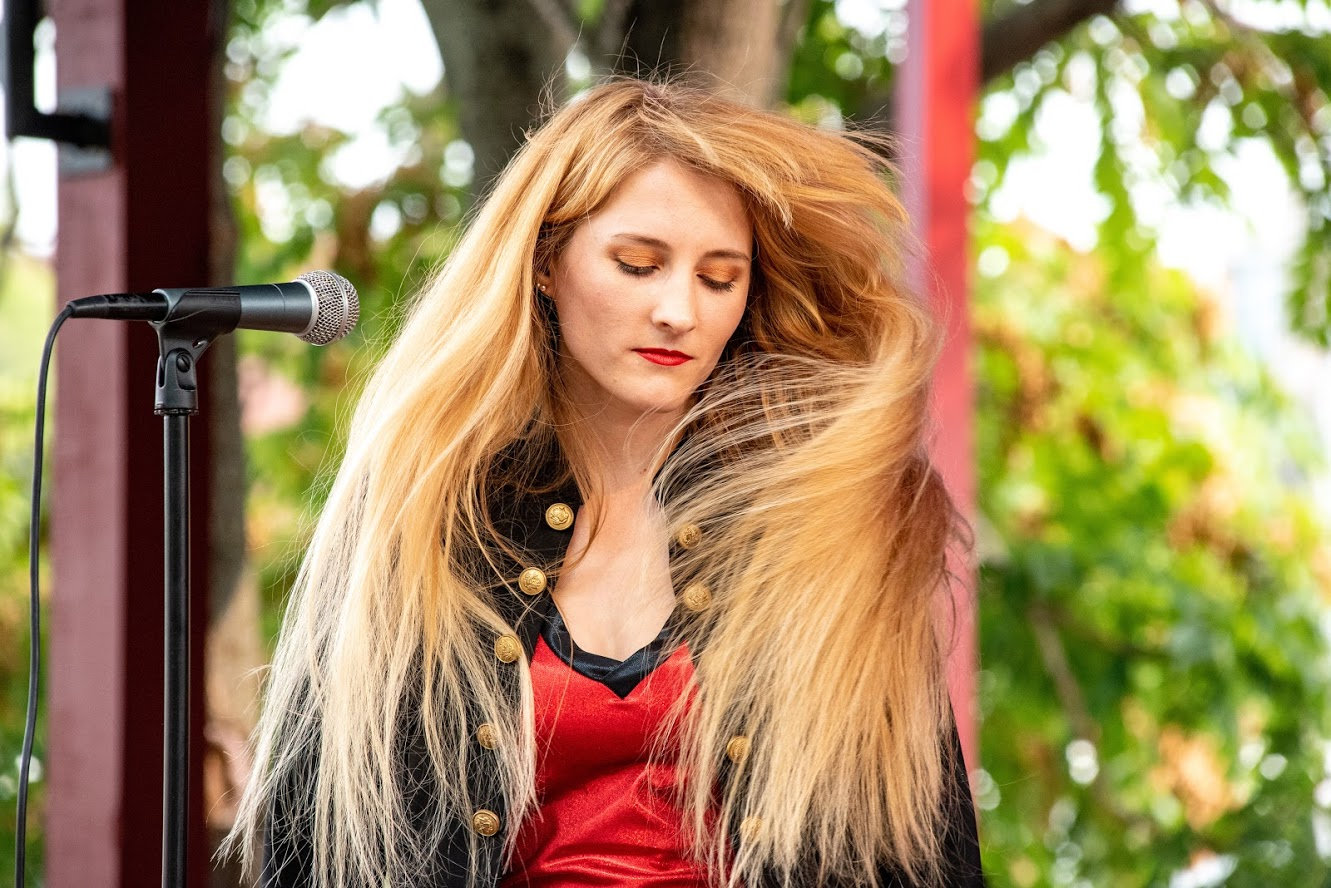
- Acuff performing at Fortune Fest, August 2018

Background information
- Born: Columbia, Missouri, U.S.
- Origin: United States
- Genres: Folk, indie, harp, psychedelic rock
- Occupation: Singer-songwriter
- Instrument(s): Harp, guitar, voice, theremin
- Years active: 2008–present
- Labels: The Nation of Love
- Website: ruthacuff.com

Ruth Acuff is an American singer-songwriter, harpist, and rock musician.

== Early life ==
Ruth was born in Columbia, Missouri. She has performed at venues in Missouri and nationally on tour. She is paternally related to country music singer Roy Acuff.

== Career ==
Ruth performs in the following bands as the lead singer and performer:

- Ruth Acuff: A self-named "indie-folk" group that includes her on harp and lead vocals, husband Jeff Mueller on upright bass, and sister Mary Leibovich on a single drum or doing vocals with a full drummer.
- The Royal Furs: A psychedelic rock band where Ruth is the lead singer and performs with a theremin. Other members include Noel Feldman on drums, Joshua Wright on bass guitar, and Mike Marshall on lead guitar.

In addition, she is a backup singer and guitarist on a Missouri-based Pink Floyd tribute band called Interstellar Overdrive, and tours and collaborates with pianist Merry Ellen Kirk.

=== Ruth Acuff (Harp group) ===
Ruth began performing with a lever harp in 2010, going to a Lyon & Healey pedal harp in 2014. She has nicknamed the harp "Haru." She performs original work and does both acoustic and electric performances.

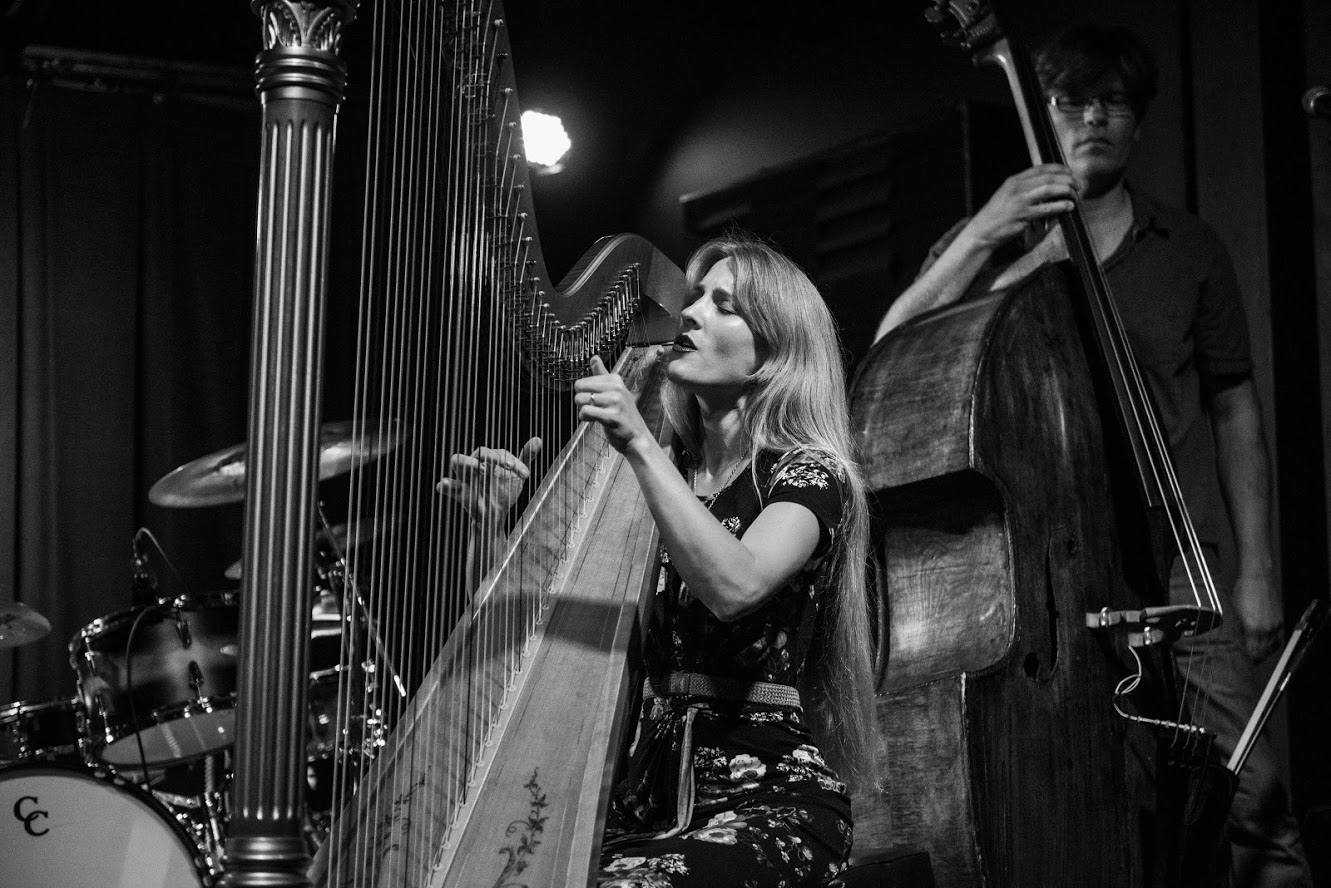
Acuff and Jeff Mueller at Cafe Berlin, Columbia, Missouri May 2018

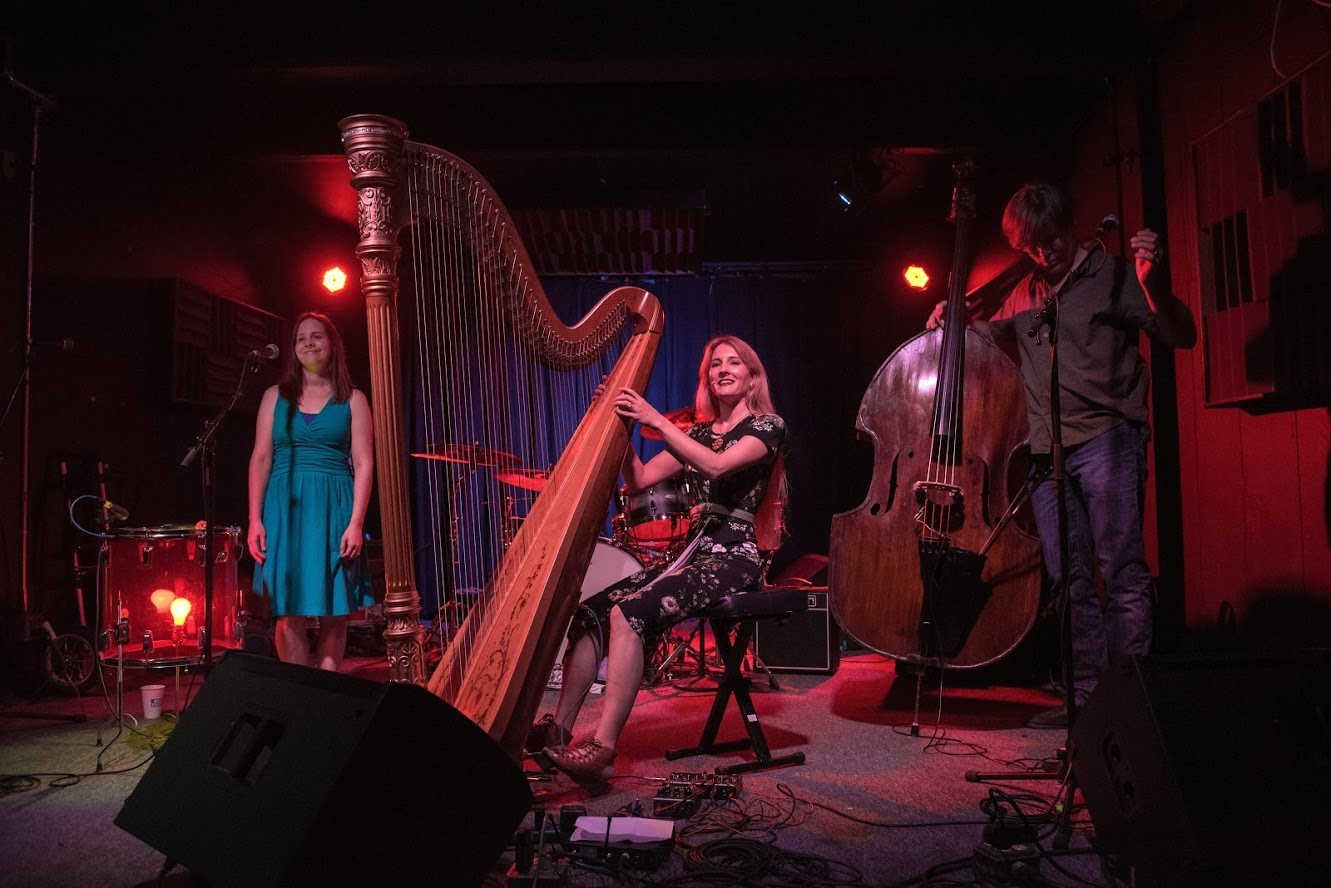
Acuff, Jeff Mueller, and Mary Leibovich at Cafe Berlin, Columbia, Missouri, May 2018

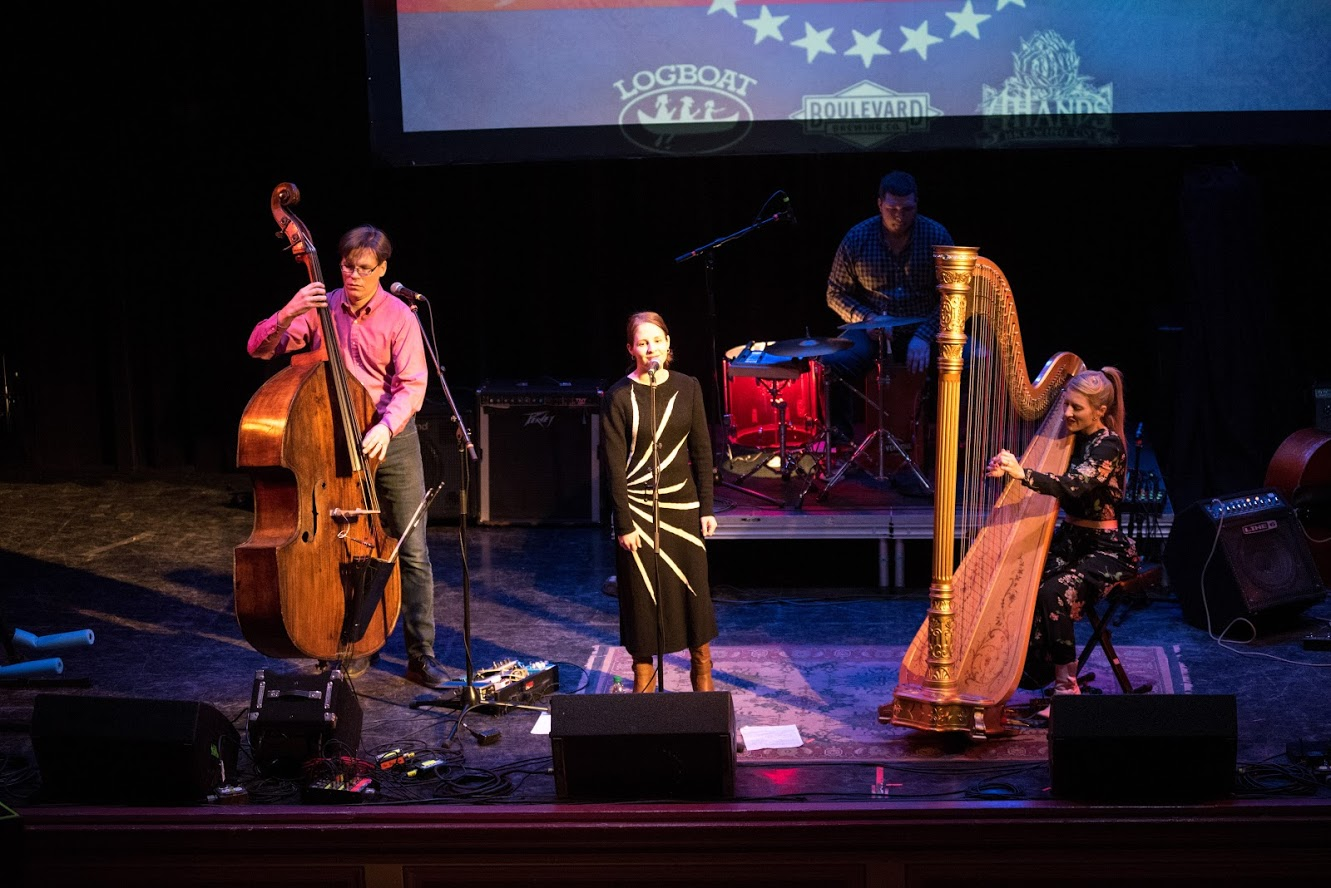
Acuff full band at Folk Fest, January 2018

=== The Royal Furs ===
The Royal Furs perform primarily original psychedelic rock music, as well as a few cover versions of popular psychedelic 60's era songs. She sings and plays theremin for this band.

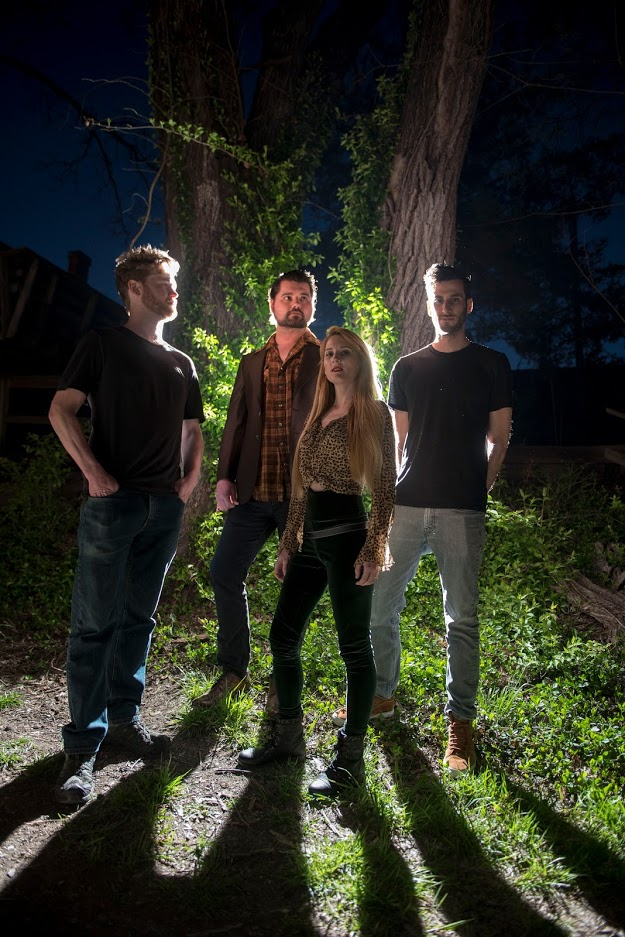
The Royal Furs current lineup

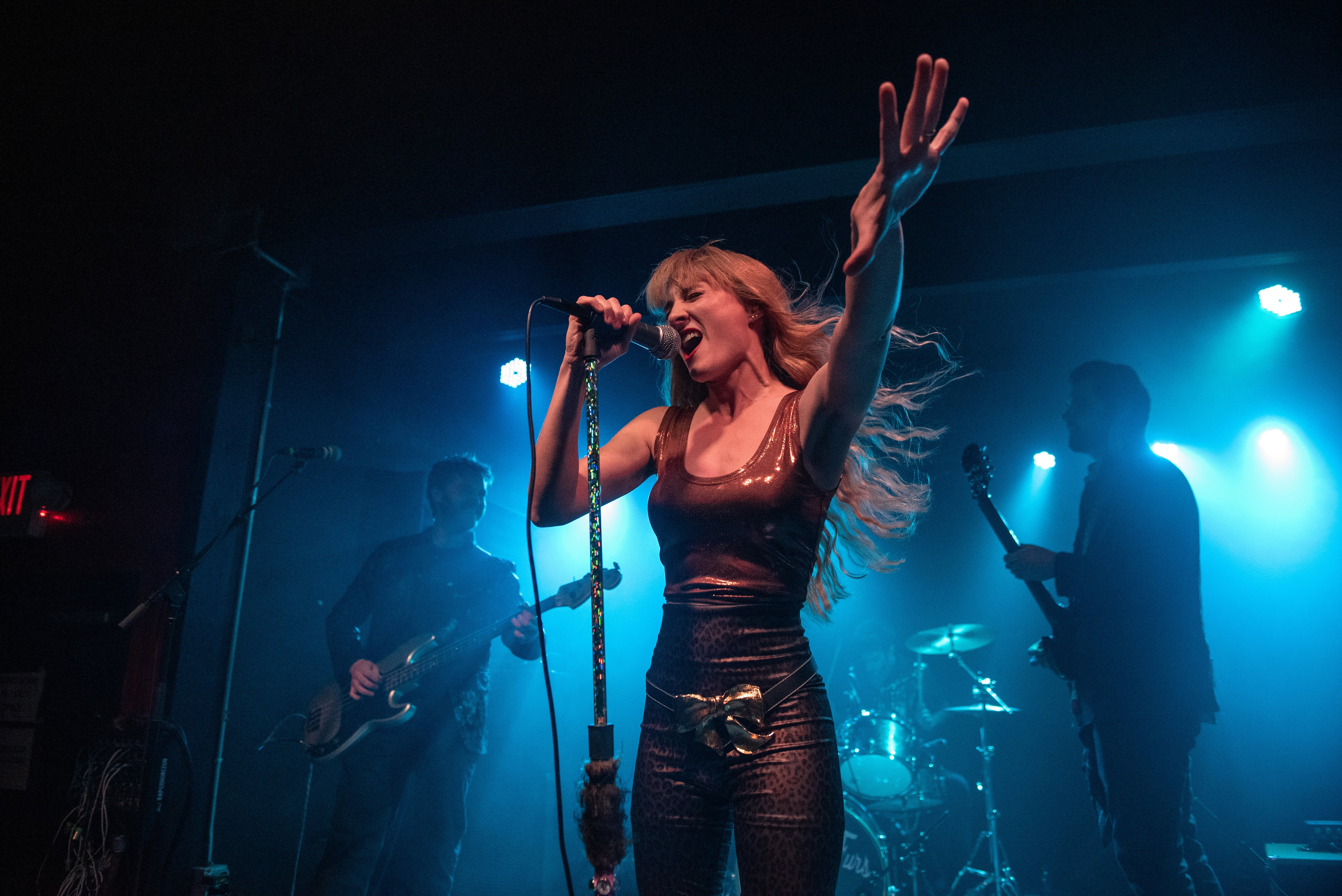
The Royal Furs at Rose Music Hall, Columbia Missouri, December 2018

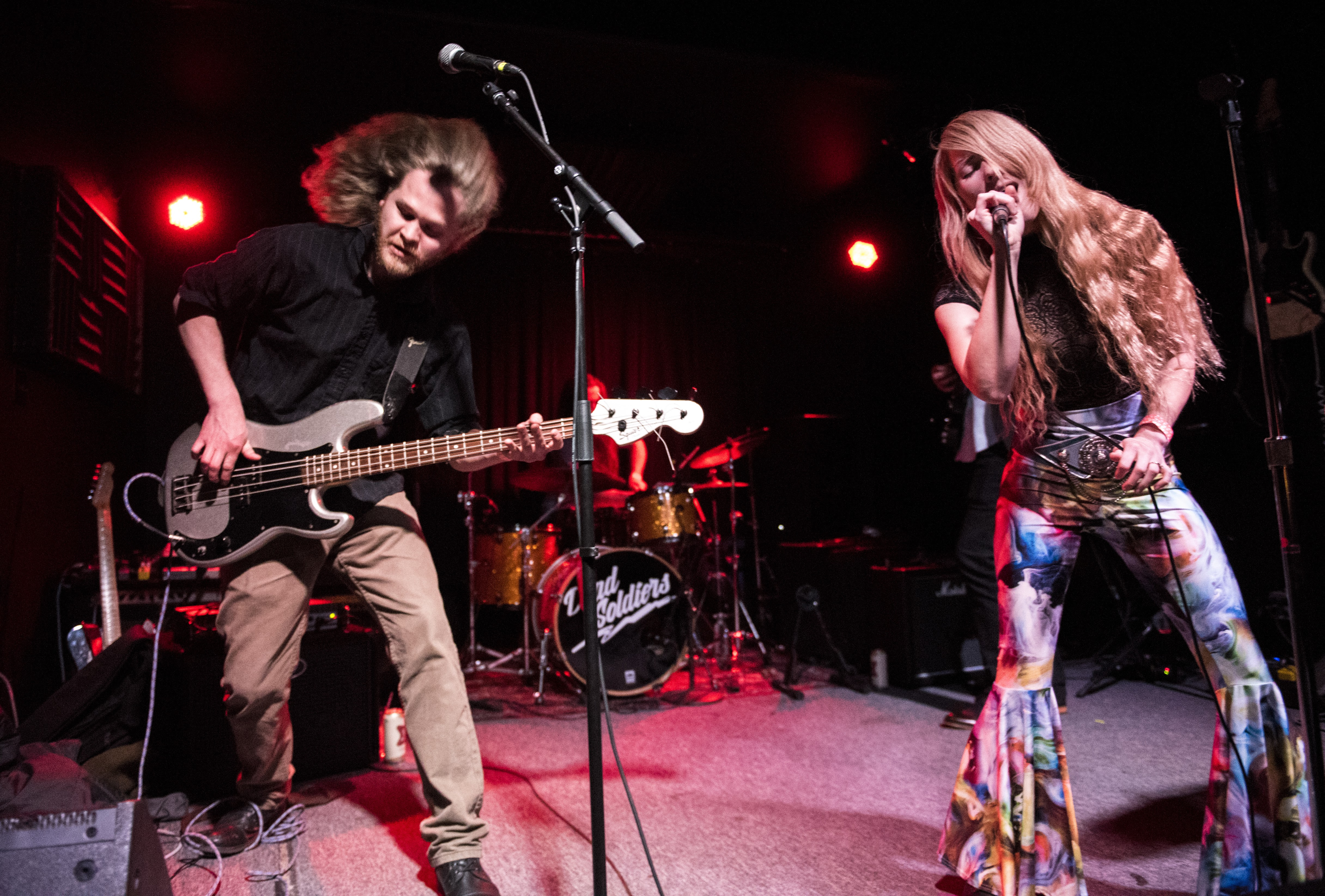
Joshua Wright and Ruth Acuff, The Royal Furs at Rose Music Hall, Columbia, Missouri, April 2017

=== Former Bands ===
From 2008 to 2010 Her and Jeff Mueller performed in a folk band called Rutherford.

== Musical style ==
Her 2013 album, This is the Dream, performed as harpist, was classified as "Indie-folk" with "echoes of Americana...as well as traces of an earthier form of chamber music." The Royal Furs has been described as "...pure 1990s Alternative Nation."

== Personal life ==
She is married to bass player and luthier Jeff Mueller from Mexico, Missouri. She now resides in New York City.

== Discography ==
=== Ruth Acuff ===
- Paisley (CD) – Independent – 2011
- Tree (CD) – Independent – 2012
- This is the Dream (CD) – The Nation of Love – 2013
- To the Moon (CD) – The Nation of Love – 2014
- We Do (Single) – The Nation of Love – 2016
- Peace (Single) – The Nation of Love – 2018

=== The Royal Furs ===
- Can't Catch Me (EP) – 2016
- Fever Dream (CD) – 2016
