= World Harp Congress =

Private nonprofit organization

Logo of the World Harp Congress

The World Harp Congress is a private nonprofit organization founded in 1981 as an outgrowth of the International Harp Weeks held in The Netherlands for twenty years under the leadership of Phia Berghout and Maria Korchinska.

The organization holds a triennial harp festival (also called the World Harp Congress) and promotes the performance of new music for the harp. The World Harp Congress also publishes a biannual journal entitled the World Harp Congress Review.

== Congresses ==
The World Harp Congress has held the following events:

- 1st World Harp Congress – Maastricht, Netherlands, 1983
- 2nd World Harp Congress – Jerusalem, Israel, 1985
- 3rd World Harp Congress – Vienna, Austria, 1987
- 4th World Harp Congress – Sèvres, France, 1990
- 5th World Harp Congress – Copenhagen, Denmark, 1993
- 6th World Harp Congress – Seattle–Tacoma, United States, 1996
- 7th World Harp Congress – Prague, Czech Republic, 1999
- 8th World Harp Congress – Geneva, Switzerland, 2002
- 9th World Harp Congress – Dublin, Ireland, 2005
- 10th World Harp Congress – Amsterdam, Netherlands, 2008
- 11th World Harp Congress – Vancouver, Canada, 2011
- 12th World Harp Congress – Sydney, Australia, 2014
- 13th World Harp Congress – Hong Kong, 2017
- 14th World Harp Congress – Cardiff, Wales, 2022
