= List of classical harpists =

This article lists notable classical harpists by type of harp in an alphabetical order.

== A ==
- Nancy Allen
- Elias Parish Alvars

== C ==
- Alice Chalifoux
- Pearl Chertok
- Elaine Christy

== D ==
- Mildred Dilling

== E ==
- Osian Ellis

== F ==
- Vincent Fanelli

== G ==
- Sidonie Goossens
- Marcel Grandjany

== H ==
- Alphonse Hasselmans

== J ==
- Pierre Jamet

== K ==
- Yolanda Kondonassis
- Johann Baptist Krumpholtz

== L ==
- Lucile Lawrence
- Heidi Lehwalder

== M ==
- Susann McDonald

== N ==
- François Joseph Naderman
- Jean Henri Naderman

== P ==
- Şirin Pancaroğlu
- Laura Peperara
- Edna Phillips
- Ann Hobson Pilot

== R ==
- Anna-Maria Ravnopolska-Dean also Irish and Paraguayan harp.
- Casper Reardon
- Henriette Renié
- Marisa Robles

== S ==
- Victor Salvi
- Carlos Salzedo

== T ==
- Marcel Tournier

== W ==
- Sylvia Woods
- Aristid von Würtzler

== Z ==
- Nicanor Zabaleta

== See also ==
- List of harpists
