= Pedal harp =

String instrument with pedals

Harp
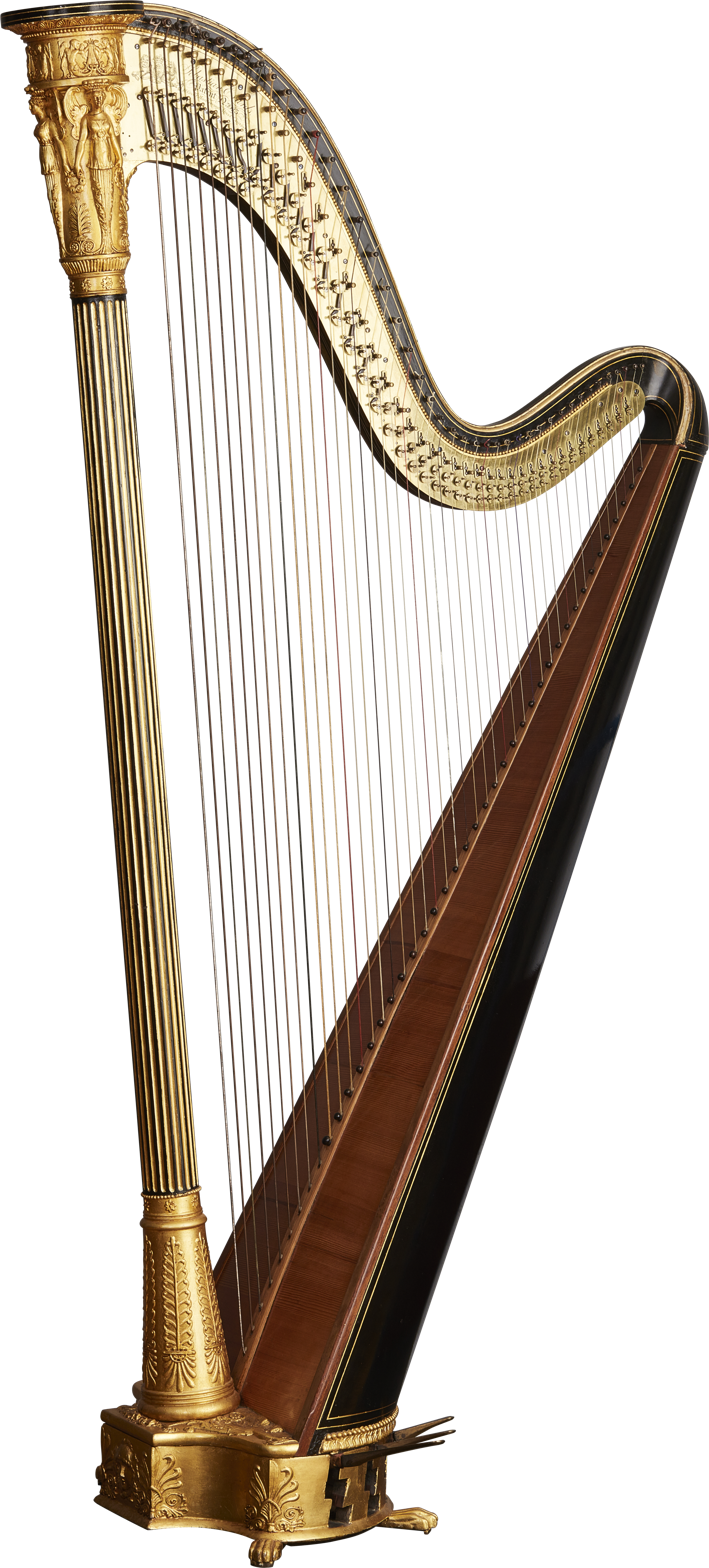
- Classification: String instrument (plucked)
- Hornbostel–Sachs classification: 322.222 (Frame harp with pedal tuning action)

Playing range

Related instruments
- Çeng; Konghou

Tudor Tulok – Glissando Imprecision for 2 Harps

The pedal harp (also known as the concert harp) is a large and technologically modern harp, designed primarily for use in art music. It may be played solo, as part of a chamber ensemble, or in an orchestra. It typically has 47 strings with seven strings per octave, giving a range of six and a half octaves.

In this type of harp the pedals alter the pitch of the strings, so that the pedal harp can easily play works written in any key. This is particularly important in the harmonically complex music of the Romantic period and later 20th-century classical music.

== Parts ==
=== Body and strings ===
A pedal harp typically stands about 1.8 m (6 ft) high, is 1.2 m (4 ft) deep, and 55 cm (21 1/2 in) wide at the bass end of the soundboard. It weighs about 36 kg (80 lb).

The body of the harp consists of a straight upright pillar, sometimes adorned with a crown at the top; a soundboard, which in most harps is pear-shaped with additional width at the bottom, although some older instruments have soundboards that are straight-sided but widening toward the bottom; a harmonically curved neck containing the mechanical action made up of over 1,400 parts; and a base with seven pedals.

The D, E, G, A, and B strings are normally colored white, while the C strings are colored red and the F strings either black or blue. The lowest strings are made of copper or steel-wound nylon, the middle-lower of catgut, and the middle to highest of nylon, although more or all of the strings may be gut. The total tension of the strings on the soundboard is roughly a ton (10 kilonewtons).

=== Pedals ===
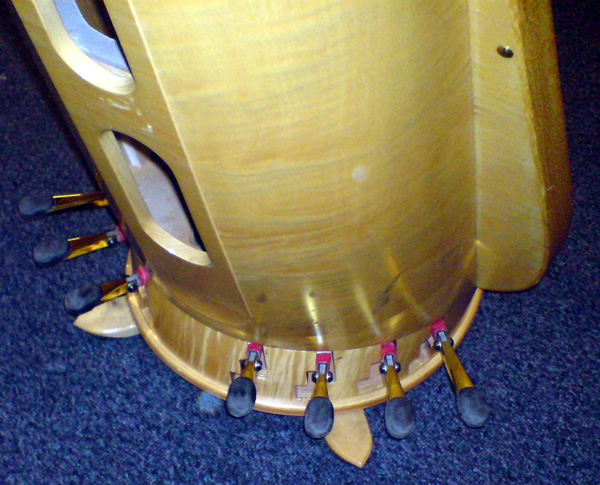
Pedals of a harp

The action of the wheels in the pedal system to change the pitch of a string. The tip of a string is shown in blue, points in contact with the string are shown in red, and points not in contact with the string are in green.

Pedals for harp tuning were first introduced in 1697. The mechanical action of the pedals changes the pitches of the strings. The seven pedals each affect the tuning of all strings of one pitch-class. The pedals, from left to right, are D, C, B on the left side and E, F, G, A on the right. Each pedal attaches to a rod or cable in the column of the harp, which connects to a mechanism in the neck. When the player presses a pedal, small discs at the top of the harp rotate. The discs are studded with two pegs that pinch the string as they turn, shortening its vibrating length. In each position the pedal can be secured in a notch so the foot does not have to continuously hold it in position (unlike piano pedals).

Pedal harps are essentially diatonic instruments with the double-action pedal mechanism providing chromatic alterations and key changes. No matter how the pedals are set, the pedal harp still has only seven strings per octave and therefore can play seven notes per octave. Smaller harps, often called folk, lever or Celtic harps, also have only seven strings per octave, and use a mechanical lever on each string that the player must move manually for chromatic alterations. The only completely chromatic harps are the double (arpa doppia) and triple (Welsh) harps and cross-strung harp.

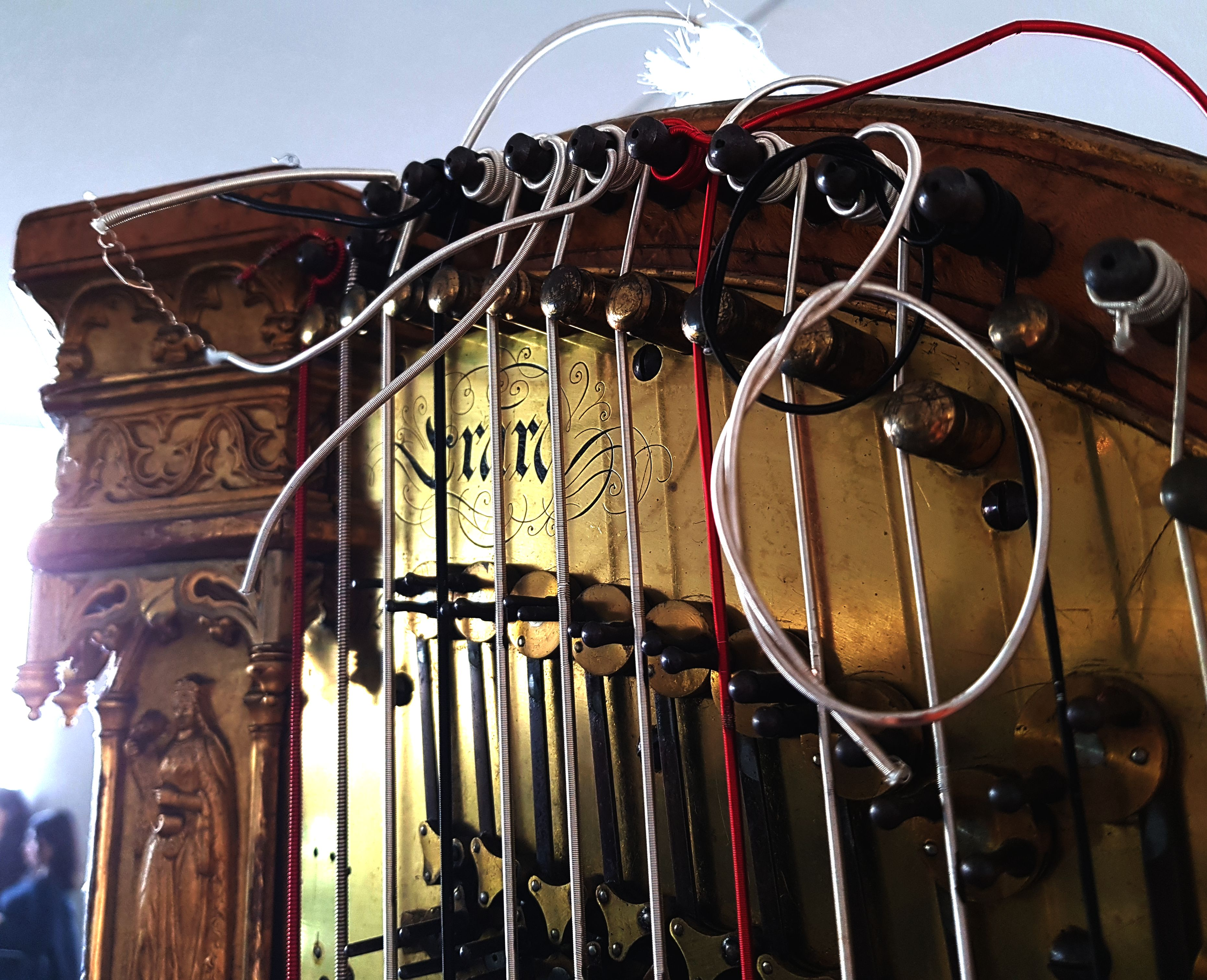
Sébastien Érard harp mechanism

The double-action pedal system was first patented in London by Sebastien Erard in 1801 (patent number 2502) and 1802 (patent number 2595). In 1807 Charles Groll was the first to register a patent (patent number 3059) where the harp mechanism was doubled with two lines of fourchettes (forks). Earlier pedal harps had a single-action mechanism that provided only sharped notes, the first of which was made in 1720 by Jacob Hochbrucker in Bavaria.

=== Tuning ===
In the normal state (pedals not operated) the strings are tuned to all flat pitches, the scale of C♭ major. C♭ major is equivalent to B major, and for most instruments it is far more common to notate this scale as B major, as it has five sharps rather than seven flats. However, for convenience in adjusting and playing the harp (by avoiding renaming the strings), harp parts are notated in C♭ rather than B, even when other instruments are written in B.

Each pedal has three positions. In the top position, the strings are free and all notes are flat. In the middle position, the top disc's pins press against the string, resulting in natural notes and giving the scale of C♮ major if all pedals are used. In the bottom position, the second, lower disc operates, shortening the string again to create a sharp and giving the scale of C♯ major if all pedals are used.

Three strings have no pedal tuning mechanism: the lowest C and D and the highest G. These strings are normally tuned to C♮, D♮, and G♮ respectively. However, they can also be tuned sharp or flat prior to performance. This can be indicated by verbal statements at the beginning of a composition, for example, "Tune low C to C♭", or "If necessary, tune high G to G♯".

Other scales, diatonic and synthetic, can be obtained by combining the pedals. It is also possible to play many chords in traditional harmony by adjusting pedals so that some notes are enharmonic, a central part of pedal harp technique.

Tuned in C♭ major, the range of the harp is from the C♭ three octaves below middle C to three and a half octaves above, usually ending on G♭. Using octave designations, the range is C♭_{1} to G♭_{7}.

== Technique ==
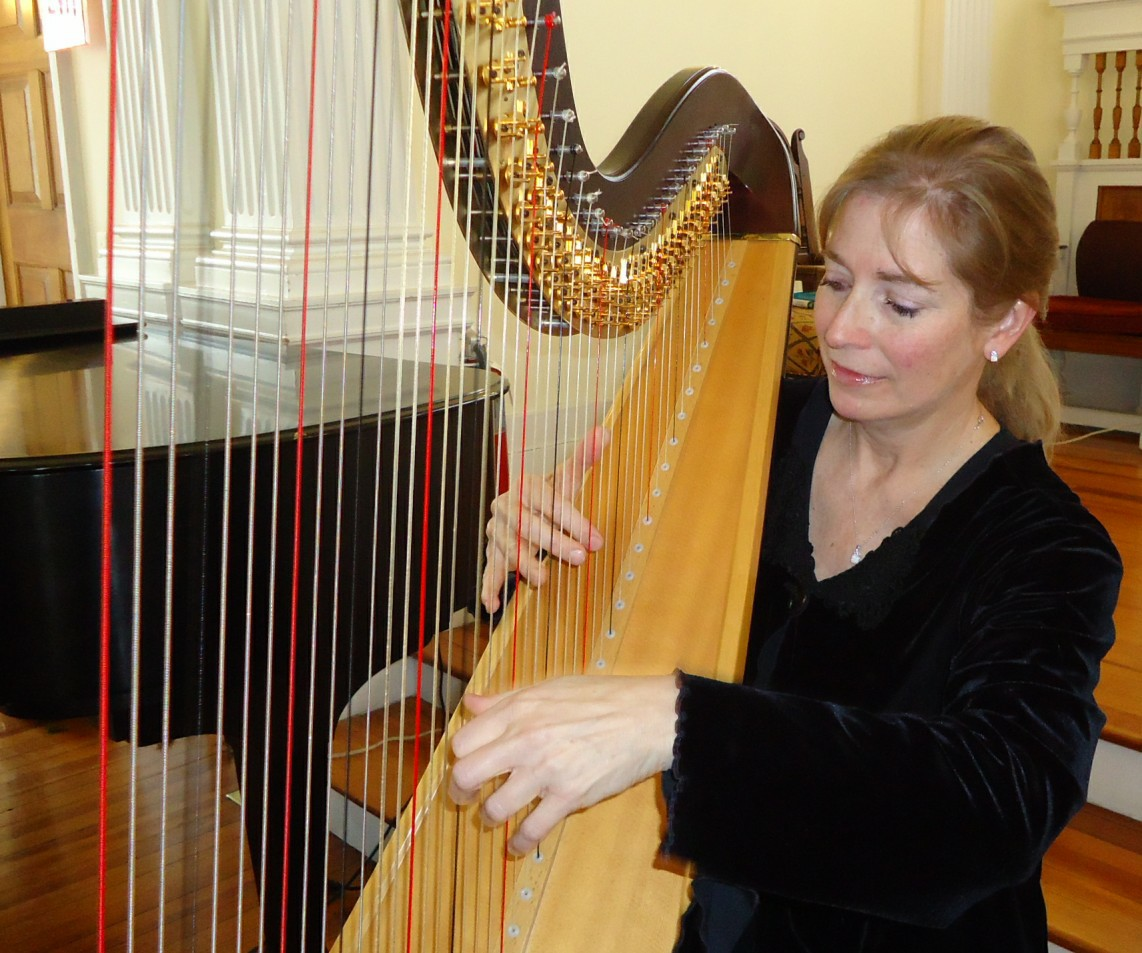
Harpist Elaine Christy plays with both hands approaching the strings from either side of the harp; foot pedals (not shown) can change the pitch of specific strings by a half step.

The pedal harp is played with the fingertips of the first four fingers (thumb, index, middle and ring fingers). The little fingers are not used because they are too short and cannot reach the correct position without distorting the position of the other fingers (although on some folk harps with light tension and closely spaced strings they may occasionally be used). The fifth finger may also have been used on earlier, more lightly strung modern harps. Madame de Genlis, for example, in her Méthode, published in Paris in the early 19th century, promotes the use of all fingers, while Roslyn Rensch suggests that Mlle de Guînes, the harpist for whom Mozart wrote his Concerto for Flute and Harp, might occasionally have used all five fingers when playing the harp. In more modern music, the little finger is used very rarely, for example in simultaneous cluster chords, such as in Daniel Kessner's Sonatina. The fingertips are drawn in to meet the palm, thus releasing the string from whatever pressure was placed upon it by the fingers. The fingers are naturally curved or rounded as they touch it, and the thumb is gently curved as the tip rises to it as an arc from its base.

Plucking with varying degrees of force creates dynamics (loudness and softness). Different types of plucking can also create different tones and sounds. Depending on finger position, different tones can be produced: a full sound in the middle of the string and a nasal, guitar-like sound at the very bottom. Tone is also affected by the skin of the harpist, how much oil and moisture it contains, and the amount of thickening by callus formation and its surface texture.

Lady with Harp: Eliza Ridgely, depicts a Regency-era single-action pedal harp (Thomas Sully, 1818)

There are differing schools of technique for playing the pedal harp. The largest are the various French schools. There are specific Russian, Viennese, and other schools across Europe. One is the Attl technique, after Kajetan Attl, in which apparently only the uppermost parts of the fingers move and the hand is largely still. There is a St. Petersburg school (more than one) in Russia in which the player moves the thumbs in a circular fashion rather than in and out toward the hand.

The differences between the French schools lie in the posture of the arms, shape of the hand, and musical aesthetics. The traditional French schooling lets the player lightly rest the right arm against the harp, using the wrist to sometimes bring the hand only away from the string. The left arm moves more freely. Finger technique and control are the emphasis of the technical approach, with extensive use of exercises and etudes to develop this. Two very influential 20th-century teachers of this approach were Henriette Renié and Marcel Grandjany, who studied with Alphonse Hasselmans. The other major French school is the Salzedo school, developed by Carlos Salzedo, who also studied with Alphonse Hasselmans at the Paris Conservatoire. Salzedo's technique generally calls for the arms to be held horizontally and emphasizes the role of aesthetic hand and arm gestures after the string has been plucked: "Each of the thirty-seven tone colors and effects of the harp calls for a gesture corresponding to its sonorous meaning."

== Orchestral role ==
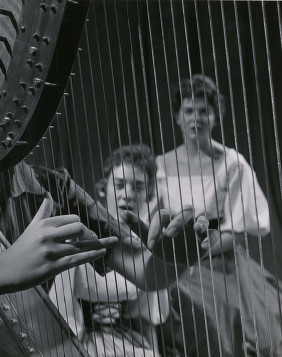
Harpist performing

The harp found its early orchestral use as a solo instrument in concerti by many baroque and classical composers (Händel, Mozart, Boieldieu, Albrechtsberger, Schenk, Dussek, Spohr) and in the opera houses of London, Paris and Berlin and most other capitals. Hector Berlioz began to use it in symphonic music, but he found performances frustrating in countries such as Germany, which had few harps or sufficiently proficient harpists. Franz Liszt was seminal using the harp in his orchestral music. The French and Russian Romantic composers particularly expanded its symphonic use. In opera, the Italian composers used it regularly, and Puccini was a particular master of its expressive and coloristic use. Debussy can be said to have put the harp on the map in his many works that use one or more harps. Tchaikovsky also was of great influence, followed by Rimsky-Korsakov, Richard Strauss and Wagner. The greatest influence on use of the harp has always been the availability of fine harps and skilled players, and the great increase of them in the US of the 20th century resulted in its spread into popular music.

== Jazz ==
The first harpist known to play jazz was Casper Reardon, a pioneer in the world of "hot" music. Dorothy Ashby (whose work is often sampled by hip hop artists), Brandee Younger, Nala Sinephro and Alice Coltrane are other jazz harpists.

== Ballet ==
Many passages for solo harp can be found in 19th-century ballet music, particularly in scores for the ballets staged for the Mariinsky Theatre of St. Petersburg, where the harpist Albert Zabel played in the orchestra. In ballet, the harp was utilised to a great extent to embellish the dancing of the ballerina. Elaborate cadenzas were composed by Tchaikovsky for his ballets The Nutcracker, Swan Lake, and The Sleeping Beauty; as well as Alexander Glazunov for his score for the ballet Raymonda. In particular, the scores of Riccardo Drigo contained many pieces for harp in such works as Le Talisman (1889), Le Réveil de Flore (1894) and Les Millions d'Arlequin (1900).

Cesare Pugni wrote extensively for the harp as well—his ballet Éoline, ou La Dryade included music written for harp to accompany the ballerina's numerous variations and enhance the atmosphere of the ballet's many fantastical scenes. Ludwig Minkus was celebrated for his harp cadenzas, most notably the Variation de la Reine du jour from his ballet La Nuit et le Jour (1881), the elaborate entr'acte composed for Albert Zabel from his ballet Roxana (1878), and numerous passages found in his score for the ballet La Bayadère, which in some passages were used to represent a veena, which was used on stage as a prop. French ballet composers such as Delibes, Gounod, and Massenet made use of the harp in their music.

== Pop music ==
There is a prominent harp part in "She's Leaving Home" by The Beatles in their 1967 album Sgt. Pepper's Lonely Hearts Club Band. In the 1970s, harp parts were common in popular music, and can be heard in such hits as Cher's "Dark Lady" and "Gypsies, Tramps & Thieves", as well as "Boogie Nights" by Heatwave. Most often it was played by Los Angeles studio harpist Gayle Levant, who has played on hundreds of recordings. Irish band Clannad featured the harp heavily in their music during the 1970s and 1980s.

In current pop music, the harp appears relatively rarely. Joanna Newsom, Dee Carstensen, Darian Scatton, Habiba Doorenbos, and Jessa Callen of The Callen Sisters have separately established images as harp-playing singer-songwriters with signature harp and vocal sounds. Canadian singer-songwriter Sarah McLachlan plays the harp in her 2006 holiday album, Wintersong. In Hong Kong, a notable example of harp in pop music is the song "Tian Shui Walled City" (天水圍城) performed by Hacken Lee with harp played by Korean harpist Jung Kwak (Harpist K).

The harp is also used as a central instrument by many alternative popular musicians. A pedal harpist, Ricky Rasura, is a member of the "symphonic pop" band, The Polyphonic Spree. Also, Björk sometimes features acoustic and electric harp in her work, often played by Zeena Parkins. Philadelphia based Indie Pop Band Br'er uses a pedal harp as the foundation for their cinematic live sets. Art in America was the first known rock band featuring a pedal harp to appear on a major record label, released in 1983. The pedal harp was also present in the Michael Kamen and Metallica concert and album, S&M, as part of the San Francisco Symphony orchestra. R&B singer Maxwell featured harpist Gloria Agostini in 1997 on his cover of Kate Bush's "This Woman's Work". On his 7th solo album Finding Forever, hip-hop artist Common features harpist Brandee Younger on the introductory track, followed by a Dorothy Ashby sample from her 1969 recording of "By the Time I Get to Phoenix".

Some Celtic-pop crossover bands and artists such as Clannad and Loreena McKennitt include folk harps, following Alan Stivell's work. Additionally Florence Welch of Florence and the Machine uses the harp frequently in both Lungs and Ceremonials, notably on "Rabbit Heart (Raise It Up)". The Webb Sisters from UK use different size harps in almost all their material during live performances. Sierra Casady, of the freak-folk group CocoRosie plays harp on several of their songs. Another musician from the UK Patrick Wolf has used the Celtic harp throughout his career, often playing it himself while singing.

== Electroacoustic harps ==
Lyon and Healy, Camac Harps, Salvi Harps, and other manufacturers also make electroacoustic pedal harps. The electroacoustic pedal harp is a modified concert harp, with piezoelectric pickups at the base of each string and an amplifier. Electroacoustic harps are a blend of electric and acoustic, with the option of using an amplifier or playing the harp just like a normal pedal harp. The electric harp is different from the electroacoustic harp, as it is entirely electric, lacking a soundbox and being nearly mute without an amplifier.

== See also ==
- angular harp (historical)
- arched harp (historical)
- epigonion
- claviharp – a harp combined with a keyboard
- folk harp
- harp (general)
- list of compositions for harp
- lyre (and kithara) often mistakenly called "harps"
- psaltery (folk zither) often mistakenly called "harps"
