= Anna-Maria Ravnopolska-Dean =

Harpist and composer

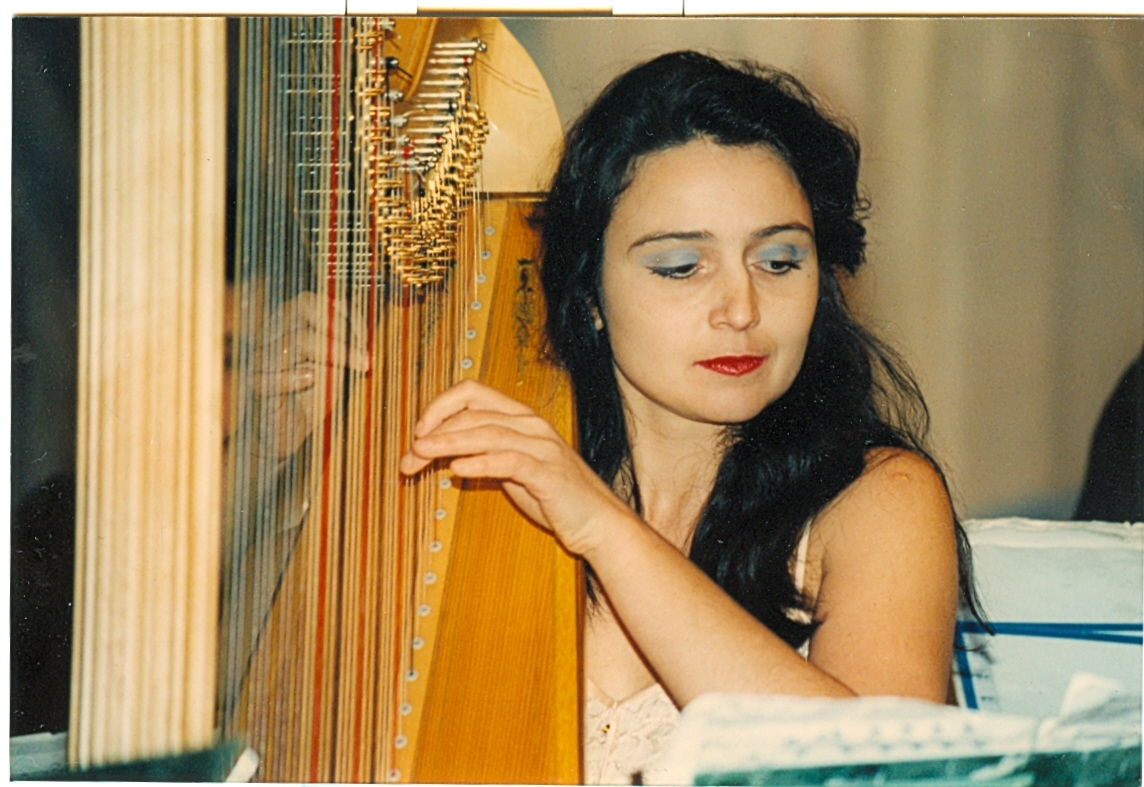
- Born: Anna-Maria Yordanova Ravnopolska; Sofia, Bulgaria
- Occupations: composer, pedagogue, musicologist and TV host
- Years active: 1982–present

Anna-Maria Yordanova Ravnopolska-Dean (Bulgarian: Анна-Мария Йорданова Равнополска-Дийн), Sofia, Bulgaria, is a Bulgarian and American harpist, composer, pedagogue, musicologist and TV host.

== Biography ==
=== Education as a harpist ===
By a recommendation of Nicanor Zabaleta she was accepted as a student by Italian harpist Liana Pasquali. After her participation in international competitions, Ravnopolska-Dean was invited to continue her studies by Susann McDonald at Juilliard School, New York and at Indiana University, Bloomington. At the Indiana University School of Music, Anna-Maria was awarded an Artist Diploma for 'Superior Artistic Achievement in Harp Performance'. When asked about her education as a harpist Ravnopolska-Dean highlights that both of her major professors were students of the French harp school: Liana Pasqualli was a student of Marcel Tournier, while Susann McDonald was a student of Henriette Renie.

=== Performing career ===
Ravnopolska-Dean began her career as a soloist at the international stage in a series of notable international competitions, including those of Gargilesse in Berry, Munich, and Jerusalem, where she was first noticed by renowned names such as Nicanor Zabaleta and Susann McDonald. During her education in Juilliard School and Indiana University, Bloomington, she was presented on the McGraw-Hill Young Artists Showcase of WXQR radio in New York. The invitation came after a committee from the program recognized her talent in the Artist Diploma recordings at Indiana.

After a competition in 1991 the North Carolina Arts Council appointed Ravnopolska-Dean as an Artist in Residence.

In 1992, Ravnopolska-Dean made her New York début at Carnegie Hall's Weill Recital Hall. Her repertoire at Carnegie Hall included some rarely performed virtuoso pieces, such as the J. S. Bach violin Partita No. 3. She later debuted in various prestigious halls throughout Europe, among others in Salle Poirel, Nancy and Gasteig, Munich.

Throughout her career she has participated in many World Harp Congresses, including those in Vienna, Copenhagen, Seattle. At the Eighth World Harp Congress, in Geneva, she played the first harp in an ensemble of six harps and had a separate solo performance despite suffering partial paralysis of her left hand.

In Bulgaria, Ravnopolska-Dean introduced the audience to a wide range of solo harp repertoire and harp and chamber music. Her performances inspired a series of Bulgarian composers including Lazar Nikolov, Dimitar Sagaev, Dora Draganova to write pieces for harp and chamber ensembles including harp. Simeon Pironkoff wrote for her a piece for her Carnegie Hall debut. Throughout 8 years composer Dimiter Christoff wrote 24 Preludes for Harp dedicated to the harpist and performed by her. Later Christoff assigned Ravnopolska-Dean to represent him as a sole performer at his 75-th Jubilee Celebration of his career as a composer. She hosted a series of TV shows about classical harp music, where she also performed a broad repertoire.

In June 2008, she became the first Bulgarian to perform Carl Reinecke’s Harp Concerto with Vidin Philharmonic and Hans Peter Ochsenhofer. In addition to her harp performances, Ravnopolska-Dean also has been active as performer on piano and Paraguayan Harp. She is among the first, or the first to introduce the instrument to the Eastern European audience. She has also played concerts of her compositions on different celtic harps, the Finnish instrument kantele and piano.

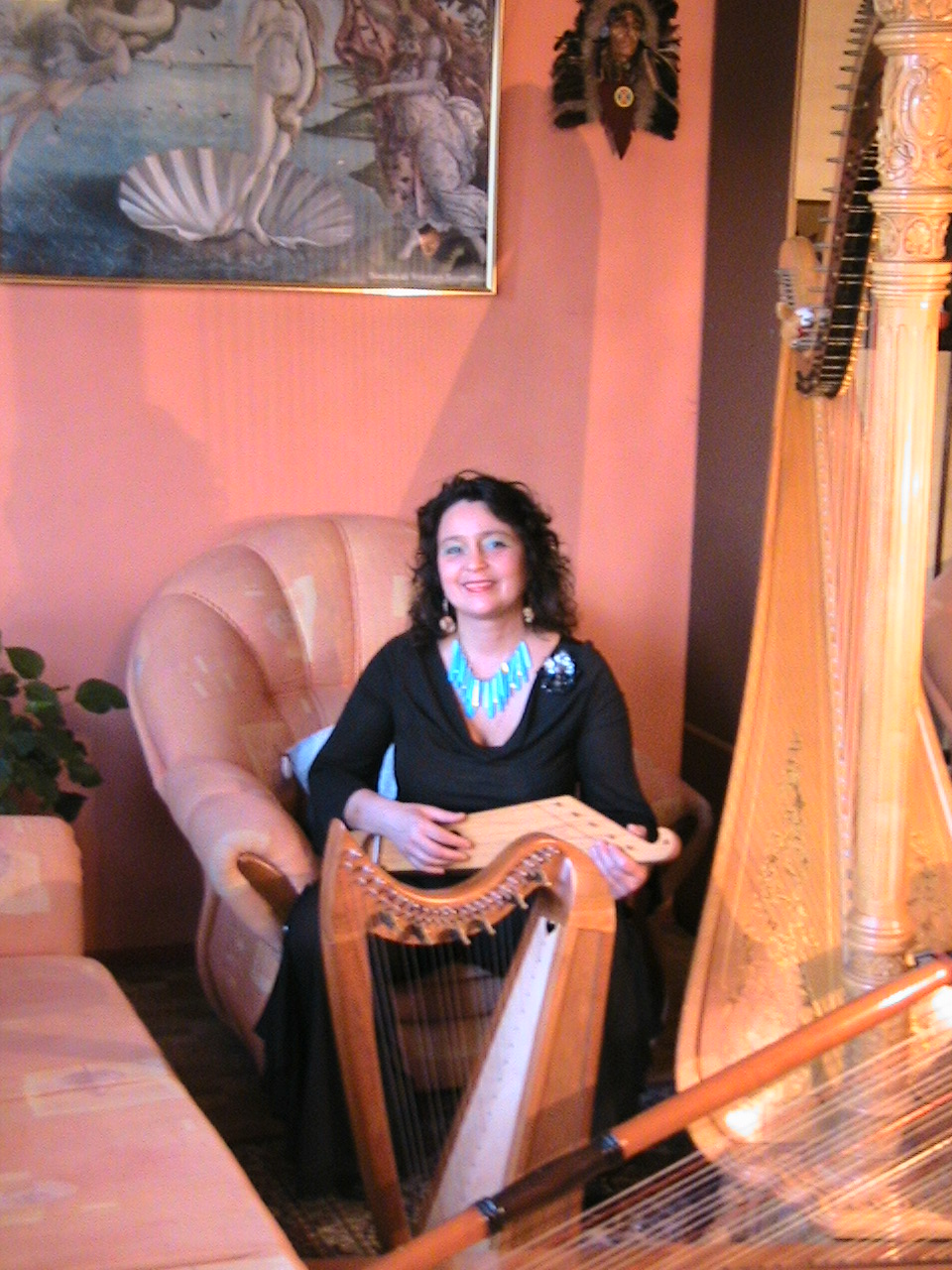
Anna-Maria Ravnopolska-Dean with her kantele, her grand concert, Irish and Paraguayan harp

=== Composer ===
Before being active as a composer, Ravnopolska-Dean arranged various pieces for harp including Isaac Albeniz’s Suita Espanol (1988), Enrique Granados’s Valses Poeticos and Parashkev Hadjiev’s Twelve Pieces in Bulgarian Rhythm (1995).

In 2003, Ravnopolska-Dean wrote her first composition "Improvisation" for solo harp. The piece was influenced by Bulgarian folk music. She was invited as a special guest performer and lecturer at the international folk harp conference HarpCon in Bloomington, Indiana: she was the only classical harpist at the HarpCon program. To honor the conference Ravnopolska-Dean decided to write the piece.

Later she wrote a series of compositions for harp based on haiku poetry in collaboration with haiku poet Ginka Bilyarska. Follow compositions for harp and voice, harp and flute, piano, piano four hands. In 2010, string quartet “Hors” performs her first string quartet “Istvan”.

Gradually the focus of her compositions began to gravitate towards popular genres, as documented by her piano and pieces. Her interest in Jazz manifests itself in her Jazz trio “Just Like This’’ (piano, saxophone and percussion) as well as „Circus“ for Jazz Band, performed by Blagoevgrad Jazz Band.

=== Academic and theoretical career ===
In 1991, Anna-Maria Ravnopolska-Dean became one of the founders of the American University in Bulgaria. At the university, she is professor of Music and teaches applied courses on the harp and the piano, as well as different theoretical courses on topics such as Latin American and Jazz music.

In her TV shows, besides playing, she also introduced the audience to different aspects of classical music and music periods, such as romanticism.

In 2002 she was awarded a Ph.D. in Music on the dissertation The Harp as A Coloristic Instrument in the beginning of the 20th Century, where among others she explored impressionist composers and their use of the harp

In 2008 students of hers played the full version of the Tchaikovsky seasons for first time on the Balkan Peninsula.

== Partial list of publications ==
- “Modeling orchestration on harp techniques in the works of Wagner, Smetana and Stravinsky,” in “WHC Review”
- The Harp in the orchestral works of Bulgarian Composers (1900–1930)

"Music yesterday-today", Sofia 2002

- The Harp as a Coloristic Instrument in the Beginning of the Twentieth Century (Original title: Арфата като колористичен инструмент в началото на ХХ век), 200 pp., ISBN 954-90353-9-5, Music Society “Vassil Stefanov”, Sofia 2001
- “The Harp as a Coloristic Instrument in the works of Claude Debussy”, In: Musical Horizons, vol. 7 - 8, 2001, 21- 25, 27 - 33.

== Partial list of compositions ==
=== Harp or including harp ===
- Improvisation for harp solo, June 2003
- The turtle’s castle for harp solo, September 2003
- Four compositions for harp on Haiku poetry, October 2003
- Waltz and Lullaby for piano solo, November 2003
- Rap Tango for harp and voice, November 2003
- Suite of eight dances: Laendler, Tango, Fandango, Horo, Kazachok, Arabian dance, Pavane, for solo harp, April 2004
- Fantasy on Verdi’s Opera La Traviata, June 2005
- Two haiku pieces on Basho, February 2006
- The mystic trumpeter on Walt Whitman, February 2006
- Five haiku pieces “Solo Honkadorae Renga”, for harp, February 2006
- Angels in Our Fields, harp and voice
- Impression and Dance, harp and flute

=== Piano ===
- Lazy Afternoon, for solo piano
- In Bossa Nova Style, for solo piano
- Raindrops, for solo piano
- Cooling Down, for solo piano
- Moments at Sunset, for solo piano

=== Ensembles ===
- Istvan, for Classical String Quartet
- Just Like This, Jazz trio for Piano, Saxophone and Percussions
- Circus, for Jazz Band

== Solo discography ==
- All Time Treasures, CD 2014
- Bulgarian Harp Favorites, Arpa d’oro, CD 2003
- Legende: French Music for Harp, Gega compact disc, 1999
- Harpist at the Opera (honoring the Donizetti bicentennial), Arpa d'oro CD, 1997
- Harps of the Americas (Paraguayan and pedal harps), Arpa d'oro CD, 1996
- Erich Schubert Pop Harp Festival, Gega CD, 1994
- A Harpist's Invitation to the Dance, Gega CD, 1992
