= Martine Géliot =

French classical harpist

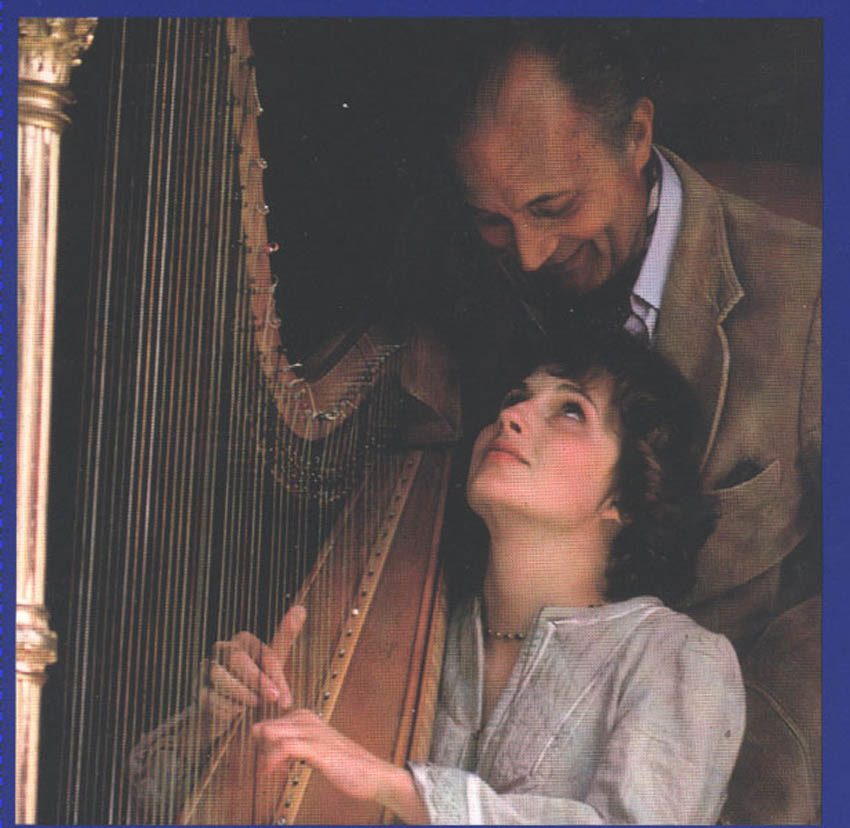
- Martine Géliot and her father, Bernard (tenor)
- Born: 8 December 1948; Paris
- Died: 7 February 1988 (aged 39)
- Occupation: Harpist

Martine Géliot (8 December 1948 in Paris – 7 February 1988) was a French classical harpist.

== Biography ==
Martine Géliot was born into a family of musicians. Her mother, Huguette Géliot, was a pupil of Marcel Tournier and won the first prize of harp of the Conservatoire de Paris. Her great-grandmother was composer Mel Bonis.

At age 14, Géliot received a first prize at the Conservatoire National Supérieur de Paris, where she was a student of Pierre Jamet. At age 16, she won first prize at The International Harp Contest in Israel.

She will perform in particular with Jean-Pierre Rampal, Yehudi Menuhin, Ravi Shankar, Jean-Jacques Kantorow, Patrick Gallois, Jacques Vandeville, James Galway, as well as with prestigious conductors. Her concert tours in France and abroad included venues such as the Carnegie Hall in New York city. From 1977, Martine Géliot was harp soloist at the Orchestre National de France. From 1976 to 1981, she played with Jean Dupouy (viola) and Thomas Prévost (flute) soloists of L'Ensemble de Chambre Français band.

At the height of her career, she succumbed to cancer in 1988, at the age of 39 years.

An international harp competition bears her name; It is organized by Huguette Géliot, Christine Lallour and Corinne Fournier. Married to Benoît Charvet, jazz musician and composer, she was the mother of Florent and Baptiste Charvet; The latter is composer and chief sound operator.

== Discography ==
- CD: "Concert en trio" (live), flute, Thomas Prévost, viola, Jean Dupouy and Martine Géliot. Works by Quincy Porter, Arnold Bax, Aubert Lemeland, Jean-Marie Leclair, Claude Debussy. Ed. Quantum
- CD: "Marcel Tournier, pièces pour harpe". Works by Marcel Tournier Martine Géliot, harp. Ed. Quantum;
- CD: "Récital de harpe Martine Géliot" (live), Works by John Thomas, Carl Philipp Emanuel Bach, Benjamin Britten, Gabriel Fauré, Albert Roussel, Germaine Tailleferre, Alphonse Hasselmans, Sergei Prokofiev, Marius Flothuis; Martine Géliot, harp. Ed. Quantum.
- Vinyl: Pièces pour la harpe: Works by Falla, Fauré, Debussy, Liszt, Chopin, J. S. Bach, Daquin, Haendel, Mozart, Debussy, Satie, Rameau. EMI 1976
- Vinyl: "Récital de harpe Martine Géliot" (live). Works by Georg-Friederich Haendel, Wilheim-Friederich Bach and Carl Philipp Emanuel Bach. Harmonia Mundi
- Vinyl: "Récital deux harpes Huguette Géliot et Martine Géliot". Works by J.S. Bach, Dussek, Boïeldieu, Chabrier, Debussy, Houdy, Lemeland, Boutry. EDIPAR 1980
- Vinyl: "Cent ans de mélodies françaises pour la harpe et le chant". Bernard Géliot, tenor, Martine Géliot, harp. Works by Franck, Gounod, Tournier, Poulenc, Fauré, Robert Géliot, Koechlin, Caplet, Debussy. UNIDISC

== Concours International de harpe Martine Géliot "Jeunes Talents" ==
The International Harp Competition Martine Géliot "Jeunes talents" is held every three years in the city of Avon, in France, near Fontainebleau.

The first session took place in 2004, then 2007, 2010, and 2013. The last session was held from 11 to 14 November 2016.
