= Tre Voci =

Classical music trio

Tre Voci is a professional classical music trio made up of flutist Marina Piccinini, violist Kim Kashkashian, and harpist Sivan Magen. The ensemble was formed after Piccinini, Kashkashian, and Magen first performed together at the 2010 Marlboro Music Festival. Tre Voci has appeared at Carnegie Hall, London's Wigmore Hall, the Kimmel Center and Philadelphia Museum of Art through the Philadelphia Chamber Music Society, New England Conservatory's Jordan Hall, Eastman School of Music's Kilbourn Hall, University of Iowa Hancher Auditorium, Le Poisson Rouge, The Greene Space in New York City (hosted by NPR/Q2 Music), Italy's Accademia Chigiana, and more venues in the U.S., Canada, and Mexico.

== Recordings ==
Tre Voci’s critically acclaimed self-titled album Tre Voci for ECM Records released in 2014. The album explores the unique flute-viola-harp instrumentation and features Claude Debussy's Sonata for Flute, Viola and Harp; Toru Takemitsu's And Then I Knew 'twas Wind; and Sofia Gubaidulina's Garten von Freuden und Traurigkeiten.

== Commissions ==
Tre Voci gave the world premiere of Toshio Hososkawa's Arabesque at New England Conservatory on April 15, 2018. The work was dedicated to Tre Voci and co-commissioned by Tre Voci, the Philadelphia Chamber Music Society, and NEC, in celebration of the school's 150th anniversary. Additional performances of the work took place at Wigmore Hall, Siena Accademia Chigiana, and U Iowa Hancher Auditorium.

The ensemble works to promote and expand the repertoire for the trio's instrumentation with arrangements and commissions. In addition to the commissioning and performance of Toshio Hosokawa's Arabesque, Tre Voci created its own arrangements of Jean-Philippe Rameau's Piece de Clavecin en Concert No. 5 and J.S. Bach's Sonata in G Major for two flutes and basso continuo BWV 1039. The trio commissioned a flute-viola-harp arrangement of Sergei Prokofiev's Suite from Romeo and Juliet (arr. Gilad Cohen) and perform Maurice Ravel's Sonatine en Trio and Claude Debussy's Children's Corner (both arr. by Carlos Salzedo).
