= Varvara Ivanova =

Russian virtuoso harpist (born 1987)

Varvara Ivanova (Russian: Варвара Иванова; born 1987) is a Russian virtuoso harpist and winner of major prizes in many international harp competitions. She also makes transcriptions for harp.

== Biography ==
She was born in Moscow in 1987 and grew up in a family of musicians, with her father baritone Vladimir Ivanov, her mother harpist Zoya Slootskovskaya, and her brothers pianist Gleb Ivanov and cellist Danila Ivanov. From the age of five she studied at the Preparatory of Moscow Conservatory under M. F. Maslennikova. Her first major public performance was in the Conservatory Concert Hall in 1993 when, at the age of seven, she played the Concerto for Harp and Orchestra in B♭ major by Handel with the Kremlin Chamber Orchestra under conductor Misha Rachlevsky.

She has been awarded numerous prizes, the first being at the age of only five at the International Competition Junior Ensembles in Art in Moscow. In 1997 she won the International Competition Piccoli Mozart in Monte Carlo, and the Prize of the President of Russia. Then in 1999, she gained First Prize at the junior division of the Lily Laskine Harp Competition in Deauville, and in 2002 she won first prize at the Vera Dulova Harp Competition in Russia. She was also awarded a scholarship from the Rostropovich Music Fund.

She toured Germany as a soloist with the Kremlin Chamber Orchestra in November 2001, after replacing Xavier de Maistre, principal harpist of the Vienna Philharmonic Orchestra, with only one week's notice. Concerts in Tonhalle Düsseldorf, Musikhalle Hamburg, Munich Prinzregententheater and Frankfurt Alte Oper were well received.

In 2002 she was a featured soloist at the World Harp Congress in Geneva, Switzerland.

Her London debut was at the Wigmore Hall on 1 June 2003, with the London Chamber Orchestra conducted by Geoffrey Simon, a concert co-sponsored by the Victor Salvi Foundation and Anglo-Suisse Artistic Foundation. The concert included a specially commissioned solo arrangement by Paul Sarcich of The Carnival of Venice by Posse, the Concerto for Flute, Harp, and Orchestra by Mozart (with flautist Neil McLaren), and the Toccata and Fugue in D minor by Bach arranged for solo harp by Marcel Grandjany. English critic Edward Johnson commented, "Ivanova demonstrated that she is a born virtuoso. Her sensitivity, beauty of sound and musicality captured a near-capacity audience … one of the very few harpists who can simultaneously awe and charm".

In November 2003 she won first prize at the 15th International Harp Contest in Israel, where she also received the Esther Herlitz Prize, awarded for the best performance of a free-choice composition written after 1950, for her performance of Maqamat by Ami Ma'ayani.

In 2004 she gave recitals at the BEMUS Music Festival in Belgrade, followed by performances at the Gstaad Music Festival in Switzerland, and the Harp Music Festival in Belgrade in 2005, as well as a concert tour in Russia.

She made her first visit to the United States in spring 2005, performing a series of concerts. She made her New York debut at the Merkin Hall, followed by a concert four days later at the Libby Gardner Concert Hall in Salt Lake City where she played arrangements of keyboard compositions including those of Bach, Chopin, Ravel, Tchaikovsky, Brahms and, as an encore, Liebesträume by Liszt. Later that year on 24 September 2005, she took part in a concert at the Tchaikovsky Concert Hall in Moscow to celebrate the 15th anniversary of the restoration of the Greater Church of the Ascension in Bolshaya Nikitskaya Street, her own parish church.

On 5 October 2008 she gave a concert at the 10th International Harp Festival in the Royal Palace of Gödöllő in Hungary, with a programme including music by Bach, Spohr, Mchedelov, Smetana, Mussorgsky and Parish Alvars.

The renowned Russian cellist and conductor Mstislav Rostropovich said of her, "She is an outstanding harpist and is already able to perform in all the world demonstrating precise knowledge of her instrument and enormous talent".
