= Panka Pelishek =

Bulgarian pianist (1899–1990)

- Панка Пелишек
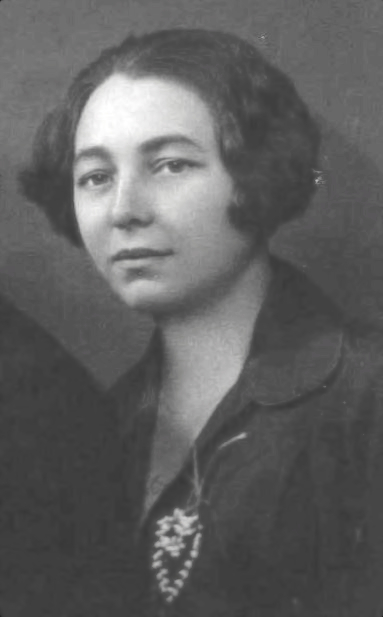
- Pelishek in 1929
- Born: 25 May 1899; Sofia, Principality of Bulgaria
- Died: 17 January 1990 (aged 90); Sofia, People's Republic of Bulgaria
- Education: Vienna Academy
- Occupations: Classical pianist; Music pedagogue
- Organizations: Sofia State Conservatory
- Awards: People's Artist of Bulgaria; Heroine of Socialist Labor

Panka Pelishek (Bulgarian: Панка Пелишек; 25 May 1899 – 17 January 1990) was a Bulgarian pianist and music teacher. She played as a soloist and a chamber musician, particularly known for performing Beethoven's works. In teaching, she encouraged students to follow "their own artistic path".

== Life and career ==
Panka Pelishek was born on 25 May 1899 in Sofia into a musical family. Her father, Václav Pelišek, was a Czech French horn player who moved to Bulgaria to receive professional musical training. She was also the great-granddaughter of the composer Fritz Spindler. At the age of 10, Pelishek started studying piano with Jindřich Wiesner, Lyudmila Prokopova, Andrey Stoyanov, and Ivan Torchanov. She travelled to Budapest in 1918 to study under pianist Arnold Székely at the Franz Liszt Academy of Music for two months. Pelishek studied at the Vienna Conservatory under Josef Hofmann and graduated from there with honours in 1923.

Pelishek toured with the singer Konstanca Kirova before she returned home to Bulgaria in 1923. There, she became a frequent concert performer, as both a soloist and in collaboration with other musicians, including the Avramov Quartet. She became renowned for her performances of Ludwig van Beethoven's works. Pelishek continued actively performing on stage until 1950.

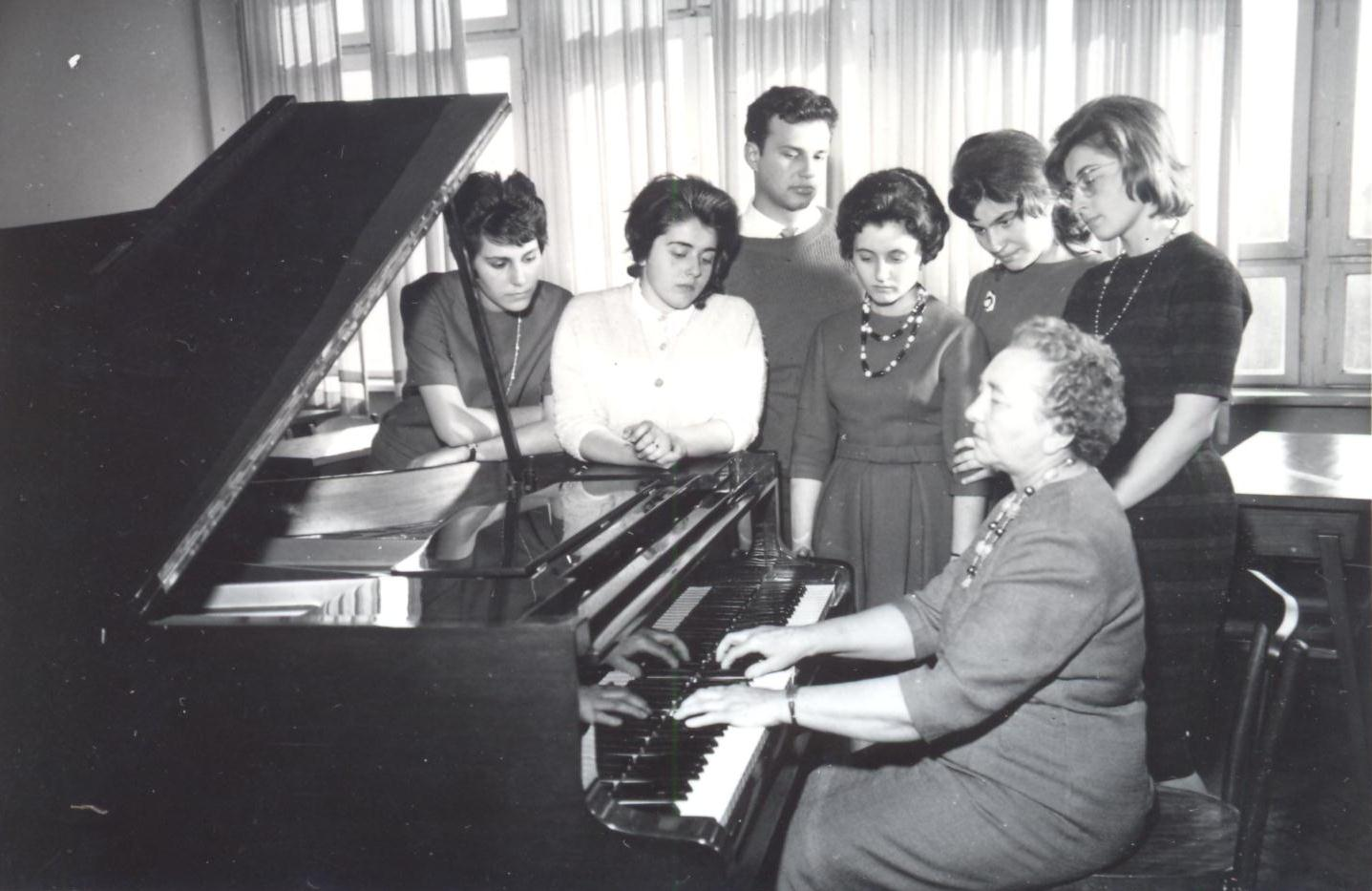
Pelishek with students, c. 1950s

She began her teaching career while she was still a student, teaching at the music school in Plovdiv from 1923 to 1925; she taught at the Sofia State Conservatory from 1925. In 1931, she became a professor at the academy, a role she held until 1977. She was inspired by Russian pianist Konstantin Igumnov's pedagogical techniques, and found it intolerable to hear students perform pieces dictated by teachers and that they should instead be encouraged to explore their own techniques and practices. Svetla Protich, Ventsislav Yankov and Dimitar Sagaev were among her students. A commemorative essay published in 1979 in Kultura praised Pelishek:

[She] shapes natural, not artificial musicians, sets them along their own artistic path. Rather than terrorize them for the sake of ... exalted principles, she nurtures and develops [her students'] individuality.

The essay further noted that Pelishek also took care not to discourage problem students, even if she sought to remove them from her classes.

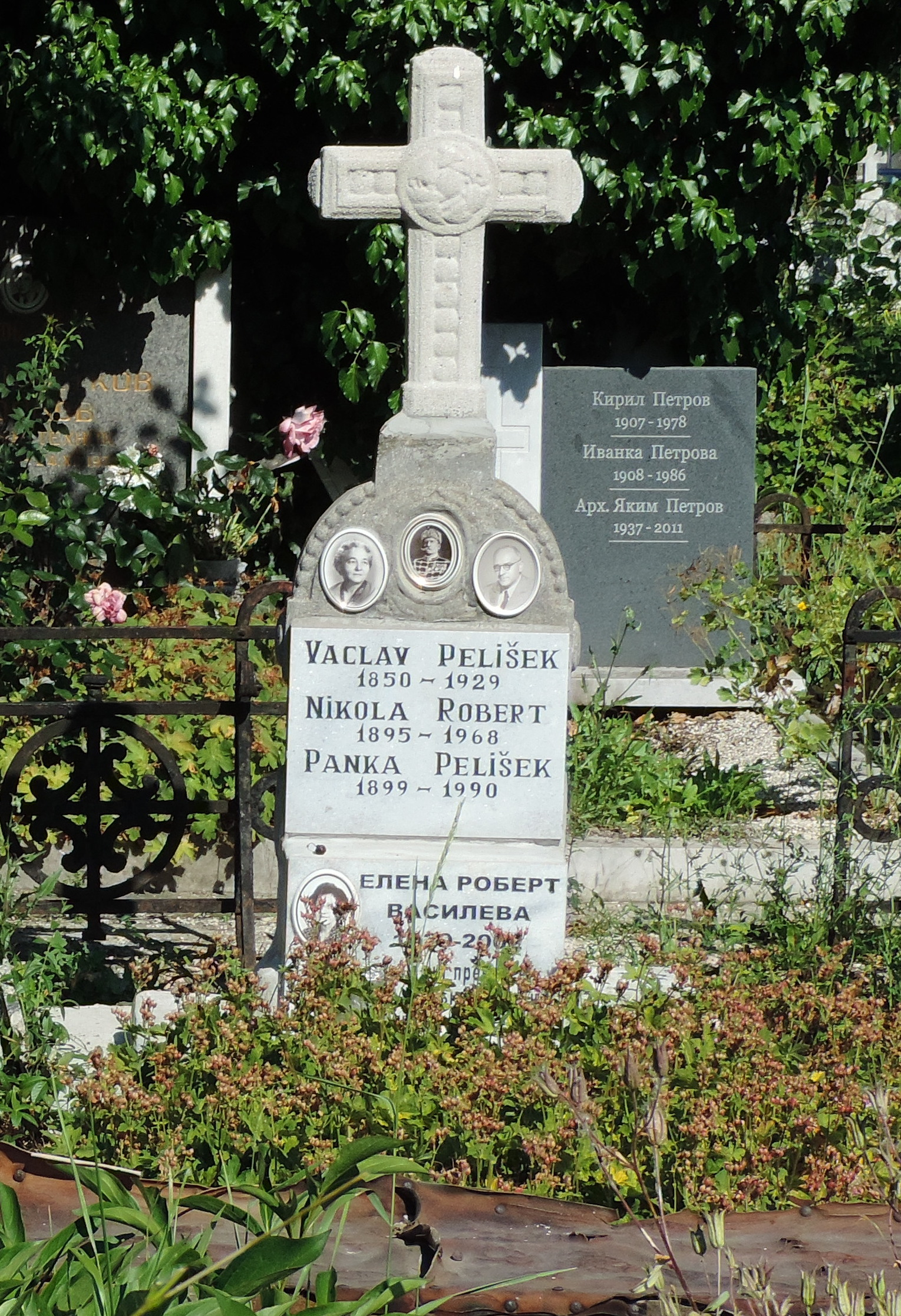
Pelishek's grave at the Central Sofia Cemetery

Pelishek was awarded the title People's Artist of Bulgaria in 1969. Ten years later, in 1979, she became a Commander of the Order of Georgi Dimitrov and a Heroine of Socialist Labor. An award for music teachers was named after her.

Pelishek died on 31 January 1990 in Sofia, at the age of 90. Her belongings, work, and notes are kept in a museum in Sofia.

== Awards ==
Pelishek was awarded the title People's Artist of Bulgaria in 1969. Ten years later she became a Commander of the Order of Georgi Dimitrov and a Heroine of Socialist Labor. An award for music teachers was named after her.
