= Nancy Allen (harpist) =

American harpist

- Born: 1954 (age 71–72)
- Occupation: Harpist
- Organizations: New York Philharmonic

Nancy Allen (born 1954) is a harpist from the United States.

The daughter of a public school music teacher in the Carmel, New York district, she won numerous international competitions starting at a young age. In 1973 she won first prize at the Fifth International Harp Competition in Israel, one of the most prestigious international harp competitions in the world. Since 1999 she has been the Principal Harpist of the New York Philharmonic, playing under music director and conductor Lorin Maazel, and in her 20-year teaching career has trained many successful students as well as serving concurrently as head of the harp departments at the Juilliard School (where she received her bachelor's and master's degrees) and Aspen Music Festival and School. She was formerly the head of the harp department at the Yale School of Music. Her own teachers included Pearl Chertok, Lily Laskine, Marcel Grandjany, and her predecessor at Juilliard, Susann McDonald.

She has made numerous recordings (one nominated for a Grammy Award) and has performed solo concerts for forty years.

Both her sisters are also noteworthy harpists. Her sister Barbara Allen is the principal harpist for the American Ballet Theatre Orchestra and the Greenwich Symphony. Her sister Jane Allen is the principal harpist for the Eugene Symphony.

Her students include Sivan Magen, Mariko Anraku, Jessica Zhou, and June Han, among others.
