= Susann McDonald =

American classical harpist (1935–2025)

- McDonald in the 1990s
- Born: Susann Hackett McDonald; May 26, 1935; Rock Island, Illinois, U.S.
- Died: May 29, 2025 (aged 90)
- Education: Conservatoire de Paris
- Occupations: Harpist; Academic teacher
- Organizations: Juilliard School; Jacobs School of Music; World Harp Congress; USA International Harp Competition
- Awards: World Harp Congress Award

Susann Hackett McDonald (May 26, 1935 – May 29, 2025) was an American classical harpist. In addition to a successful performing career, she made a number of recordings and held significant academic and organizational posts. As head of the harp department at the Jacobs School of Music from 1981 for decades, she made it the largest harp department in the world. She was co-founder and artistic director of the World Harp Congress in 1983, and founder and music director of the USA International Harp Competition in 1989.

== Life and career ==
McDonald was born in Rock Island, Illinois on May 26, 1935, to George McDonald and his wife Catherine née Hackett. After studies in Chicago and New York City, at age 15 she entered the Conservatoire de Paris, where she studied with Henriette Renié and Lily Laskine. In 1955 she was the first American to win the Premier Prix de Harpe. Not long thereafter, she placed second in the first International Harp Competition in Israel; in 1970, she returned to the competition as a judge. Around this time she also had an audience with Juliana of the Netherlands following a recital at the Concertgebouw. From her early years, McDonald toured widely; besides Israel and the Netherlands, her travels took her to South America and Canada for recitals and to Europe for radio and television broadcasts.

McDonald began an academic career, teaching for a time simultaneously as head of the harp departments at the Universities of Arizona and Southern California and California State College at Los Angeles. From 1975 to 1985, she headed the harp department at the Juilliard School. In 1981, she became chairman of the harp department at Indiana University-Bloomington in the Jacobs School of Music, and developed it into the largest harp department in the world. She was named a Distinguished Professor of Music in 1989. Her students include Nancy Allen, Sarah Bullen, Cristina Braga, Maria Casale, Erzsébet Gaál, Şirin Pancaroğlu, Anna-Maria Ravnopolska-Dean, María Luisa Rayan-Forero, Natalie Salzman, Kristie Smith, Jessica Suchy-Pilalis, and Naoko Yoshino. Her students achieved principal positions at orchestras including the New York Philharmonic, Chicago Symphony, Berlin Philharmonic, Philadelphia Orchestra, Pittsburgh Symphony Orchestra and Orchestre National de France. She held annual master classes at her summer home in Switzerland.

McDonald also played a prominent role in organizations devoted to the harp. She was a co-founder of the World Harp Congress in 1983, and served as its artistic director until 2011. She was honorary president of the Association Internationale des Harpistes, and she was in 1989 the founder and music director of the USA International Harp Competition. In 2008, McDonald received the World Harp Congress Award of Recognition for Service to the International Harp Community at the Tenth World Harp Congress. Only three other individuals received this award. She founded a publishing house specialised on arrangements for harp and teaching methods, Music Works-Harp Editions, together harpist Linda Wood Rollo.

On October 31, 2002, a fire consumed the home in Bloomington that McDonald shared with organist Diane Bish. Among the many personal possessions lost were a Yamaha grand piano and Rodgers digital organ, but several of McDonald's prized harps were saved by firefighters, and both women escaped without injuries. Much of her collection of sheet music was destroyed or damaged in the fire, but partly restored for the archives of the Jacobs School of Music.

McDonald died on May 29, 2025, three days after her 90th birthday.

== Recordings ==
McDonald recorded LPs of harp sonatas of Jan Ladislav Dussek and Antonio Rosetti for Orion Records in the early 1970s, reissued on CD by Marquis Music. She recorded a 1972 album of 20th-century music for solo harp, 20th-century Harp for Music Works-Harp Editions, featuring Ernst Krenek's Harp Sonata, Op. 150, of 1955, Alfredo Casella's 1943 Harp Sonata, Op. 68, Ami Maayani's 1961 Toccata, Alan Hovhaness's 1954 Harp Sonata, Op. 127, and Nocturne, Op. 20/1, Prokofiev's Prelude in C, Op. 12/7, and Piece for Harp, and David Watkins's Fire Dance from his Petite Suite. She recorded music for flute and harp with Louise DiTullio in 1976, Vincent Persichetti's Serenade No. 10, Ballade and Cavatina by Henk Badings, Joseph Lauber's Four Medieval Dances, and Henriette Renie's Legende. The two players recorded a second album in 1978. She recorded a collection, The World of the Harp for Delos International in 1983, played on both traditional harps from Paraguay and Ireland and on concert harps. She recorded traditional French harp literature, and music by Rosetti and Louis Spohr in a series for Klavier Records. She also recorded single issues including organ music with Diane Bish for the Allen Organ Company, music by Miklós Rózsa with oboist Allan Vogel for the Bay Cities label, and recital music for Boite a Musique.
