= Eileen Malone =

American harpist and music professor (1906–1999)

Eileen Malone (August 16, 1906 – 1999) was an American harpist and music educator.

== Life and career ==
Malone was born in Victor, New York, and studied harp at Eastman School of Music, graduating in 1928. She continued her studies at the Paris Conservatoire with Marcel Tournier and at the Juilliard School with Marcel Grandjany. In 1930 she joined the faculty of Eastman's Preparatory Department and in 1936 became a Professor of Harp at Eastman School of Music.

She continued to teach at Eastman until her retirement in 1989. She performed widely as a harpist and served for forty-three years as principal harpist for the Rochester Philharmonic Orchestra, also performing on a number of recordings. In 1962 Malone was a founding member of the American Harp Society, and served on the board of directors from 1967–73 and from 1977–81.

After her retirement, Malone worked to foster music in the public schools. She died after a stroke at age 92. A memorial scholarship was established at Eastman in her name. Notable students include Patrizia Tassini, harpist/composer Jessica Suchy-Pilalis, and Gretchen Van Hoesen (principle harpist of the Pittsburgh Symphony Orchestra).

== Honors and awards ==
- Honorary doctorate from Nazareth College, 1992
- Musician of the Year, Rochester Chapter of Mu Phi Epsilon, 1985
- Fanfare Award from the Rochester Philharmonic League, 1991
