= Dimitar Sagaev =

Bulgarian composer

Dimitar Konstantinov Sagaev (27 February 1915 in Plovdiv – 28 October 2003 in Sofia) was a Bulgarian composer and pedagogue.

He was born in the family of the writer and dramaturge Konstantin Sagaev, the founder of the first Bulgarian acting school. From 1931 he studied Piano and Music theory under Asen Dimitrov. He continued his later piano studies with Dimitar Nenov. In 1941 he graduated from the Bulgarian musical academy. There he was thought by preeminent pedagogues like Pancho Vladigerov (composition), Vesselin Stoianov (orchestration), Panka Pelishek (piano) and Tamara Iankova (piano). His works include operas, symphonies and 24 instrumental concertos.
