= Mildred Dilling =

American harpist (1894–1982)

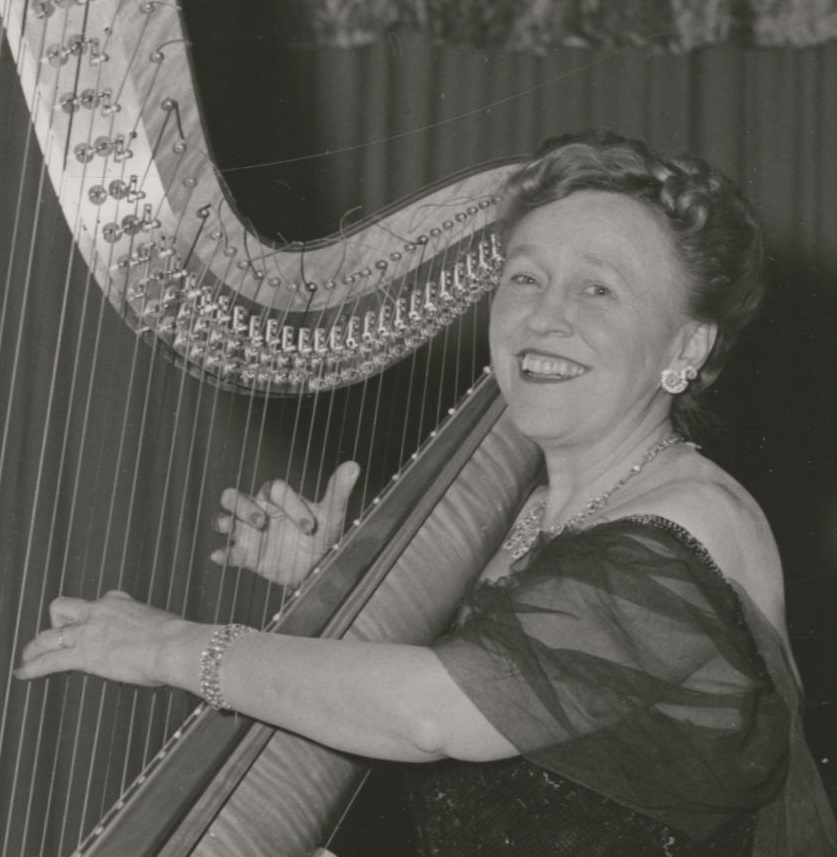

Background information
- Born: February 23, 1894; Marion, Indiana, US
- Died: December 30, 1982 (aged 88) New York City, New York, US
- Genres: Classical
- Instrument: Harp
- Years active: 1911–1982

Mildred Dilling (February 23, 1894 – December 30, 1982) was an American harpist. She studied under Henriette Renié in Paris. She first started performing in 1911, and traveled over 30,000 miles (48,000 km) per year at her busiest. She performed with many notable vocalists, had her own weekly NBC radio show, and appeared on the Bing Crosby radio show. She toured Europe and Asia multiple times, and often performed internationally. She enthusiastically championed the harp and gave many celebrities their first harp lesson, including Harpo Marx. In 1962 she helped found the American Harp Society. She devised a lever system for a non-pedal harp that made it more portable than a pedal harp but which allowed flexibility in harp tuning. Her extensive harp collection is held partially by Indiana University, and harp students still use two of her harp music compilations.

== Early life ==
Mildred Dilling's mother, Rachel Freel, grew up on a farm and once heard travelling musicians play the harp and violin. Freel was so taken with the music that she was determined that her future children would learn to play the violin and harp. Freel married Frank Dilling and Mildred was born on February 23, 1894, in Marion, Indiana. Dilling had a younger sister, Charlene. As there was no harp instruction available in Marion, Mildred studied the piano starting at age six while Charlene studied the violin. Mildred's instructor was Samuel Nussbaum at the Marion Conservatory of Music. The family moved to Indianapolis, where Mildred studied harp with Louise Schellschmidt at age 12. Upon receiving a harp for her 12th birthday, she was so excited that she "had to lie down for several minutes". At age 13, she started playing for social events, her first fee for a performance being a dozen carnations and a jar of pickles.

== Harp career ==
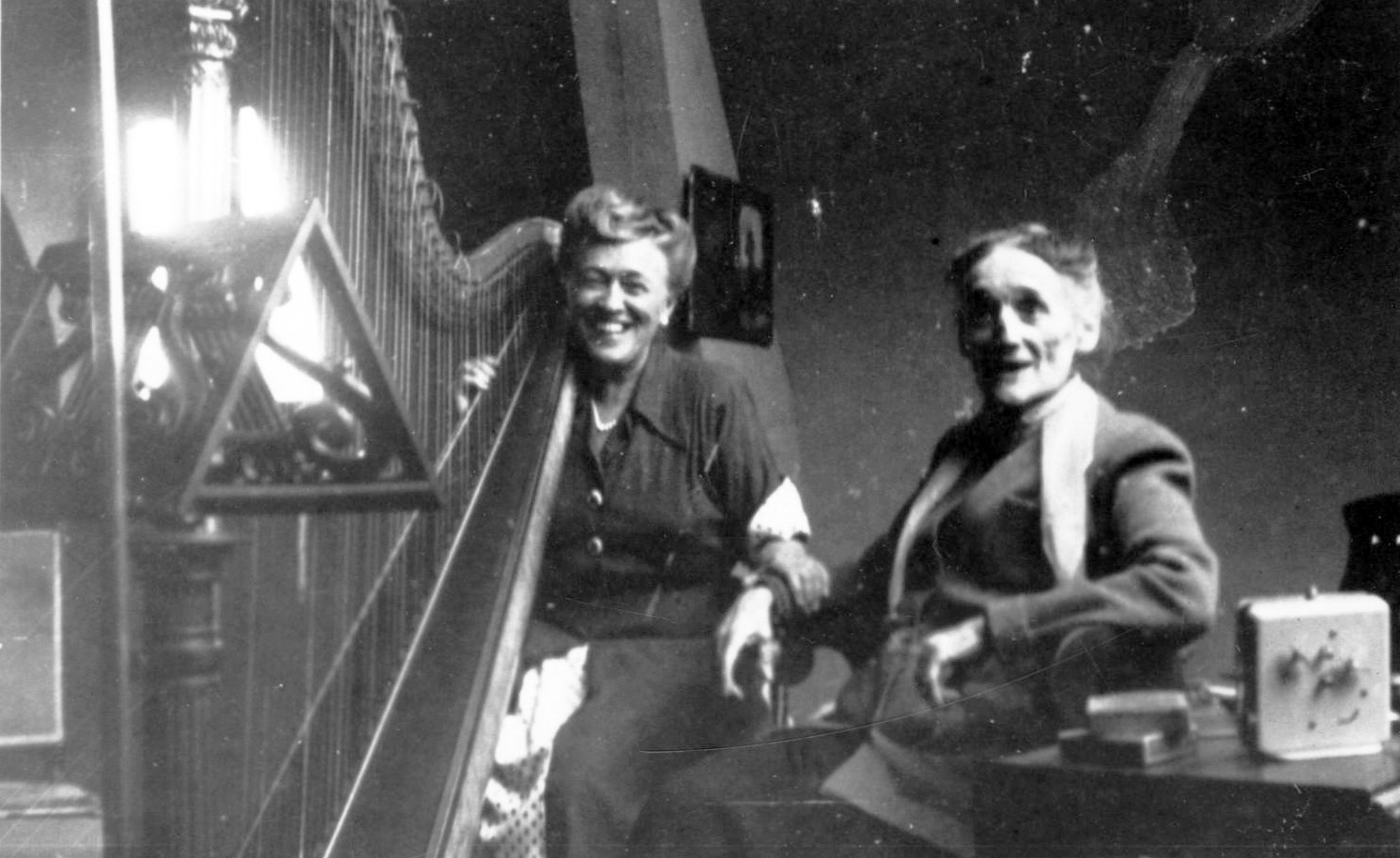
Dilling with Renié around 1934

After Dilling graduated from high school, her mother took her and her sister to New York, where they continued their musical studies. Dilling played for the Central Presbyterian Church's services, where she earned money to pay for her and Charlene's musical studies. Through this job she met other musicians, including soloists from the Metropolitan Opera, and played in special events in the area as well as with the Central Presbyterian Church. She studied with Ada Sassoli and also had lessons from Carl Scheutze and Carlos Salzedo. In 1917, she went to Paris and studied under Henriette Renié, continuing to study with her in subsequent summers for more than thirty years. Dilling credits Renié with encouraging her career and love of the harp. In 1922 Dilling took five pupils with her to France.

In 1911 she began performing professionally in Paris and toured Europe with Yvette Gilbert for several years with much success. Around this time, she also toured the United States with the quartet the De Reszke singers and the Irish tenor John McCormack. During World War II, Dilling played for servicemen. After the death of her husband in 1948, she toured Europe with her sister Charlene.

Dilling performed with noted vocalists Alma Gluck, Frances Alda, Yvette Guilbert, Nelson Eddy, and brothers Édouard de Reszke and Jean de Reszke. She played with Charles Wagner's Community Concert Series over 2000 times. She held a weekly radio show on the NBC network every Sunday before the New York Philharmonic concert. After appearing on the Bing Crosby radio show, she gave many celebrities a few lessons on the harp, including Sir Laurence Olivier, Deanna Durbin, and Bob Hope and his daughter. The lessons were filmed as a part of Artist Films's "Twenty-four Great Musicians" series. For more than thirty years, Dilling taught Harpo Marx, a self-taught harpist who wanted to learn the proper techniques. She introduced him to Renié.

Dilling was the first solo harpist to broadcast in Ireland. The BBC sent her on a tour of its stations and she performed as a guest artist with broadcasting studio orchestras throughout the UK and Ireland. She played with NBC's afternoon Chamber Music Series, performing every work then available for harp and string quartet. She performed at the White House seven times for five different presidents. The State Department sent Dilling on three German tours, two in Holland, and two in Austria some time after 1948. They also sent her to Asia in 1961. In 1963–1964 Dilling again toured Asia, including the Middle East. The State Department sent her to Central and South America in 1966, and she toured Asia again, this time with Charlene, in 1967. She gave a recital for UNESCO in Paris in October 1968. In 1971 she visited Iceland, where she was a soloist with the Iceland Symphony. There she had some of her last performances with her sister Charlene, who died in 1972.

Dilling was one of the founders of the American Harp Society in 1962 and served as a judge in many of its national student contests. She also frequently served as a judge for the Ruth Lorraine Close Awards. From 1964 until 1982, she held a two-week masterclass and workshop at UCLA. In 1970 she appeared on a BBC television broadcast. She held masterclasses in London whenever her touring schedule allowed it.

== Harp collection and legacy ==
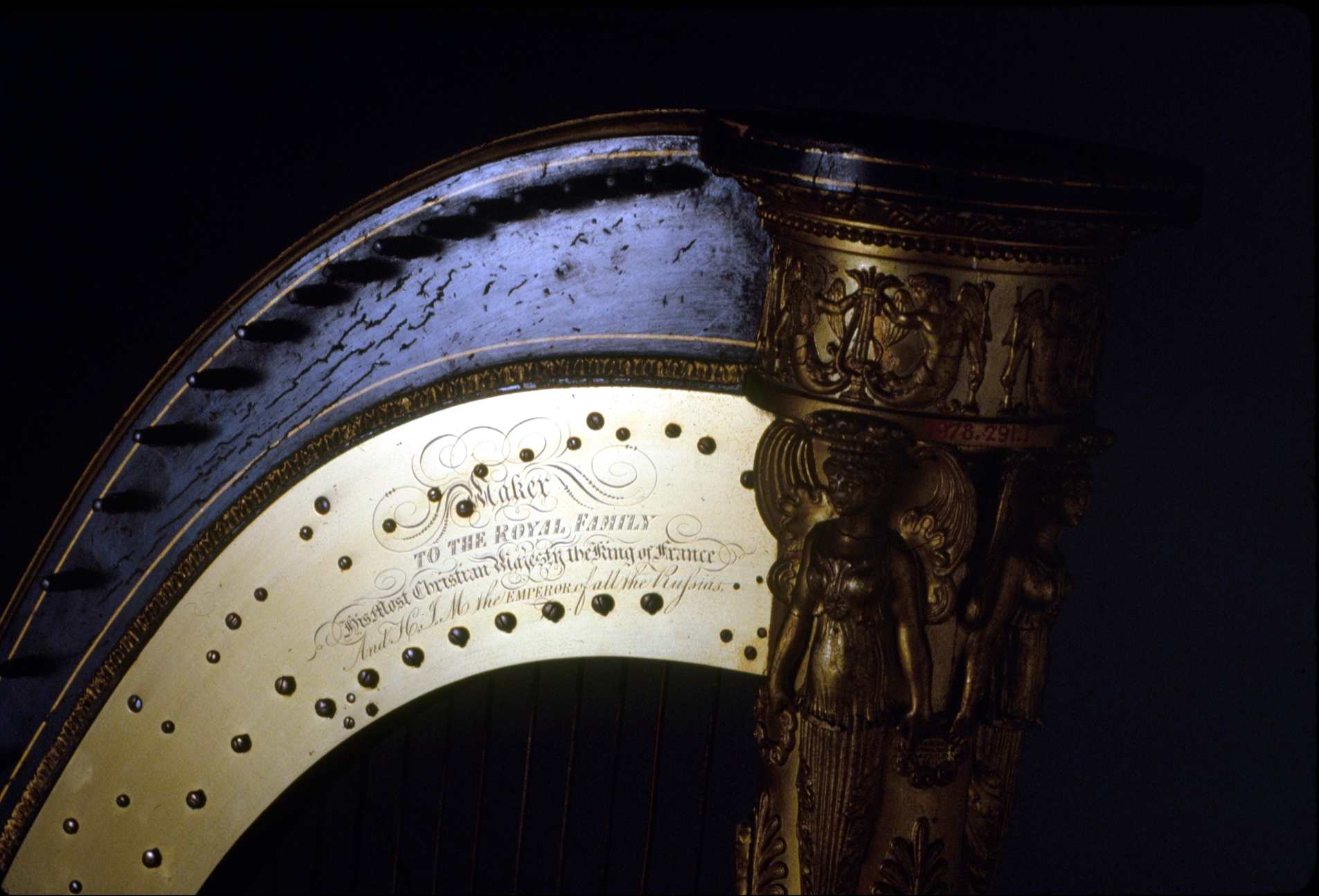
Pedal Harp that was a part of Dilling's collection

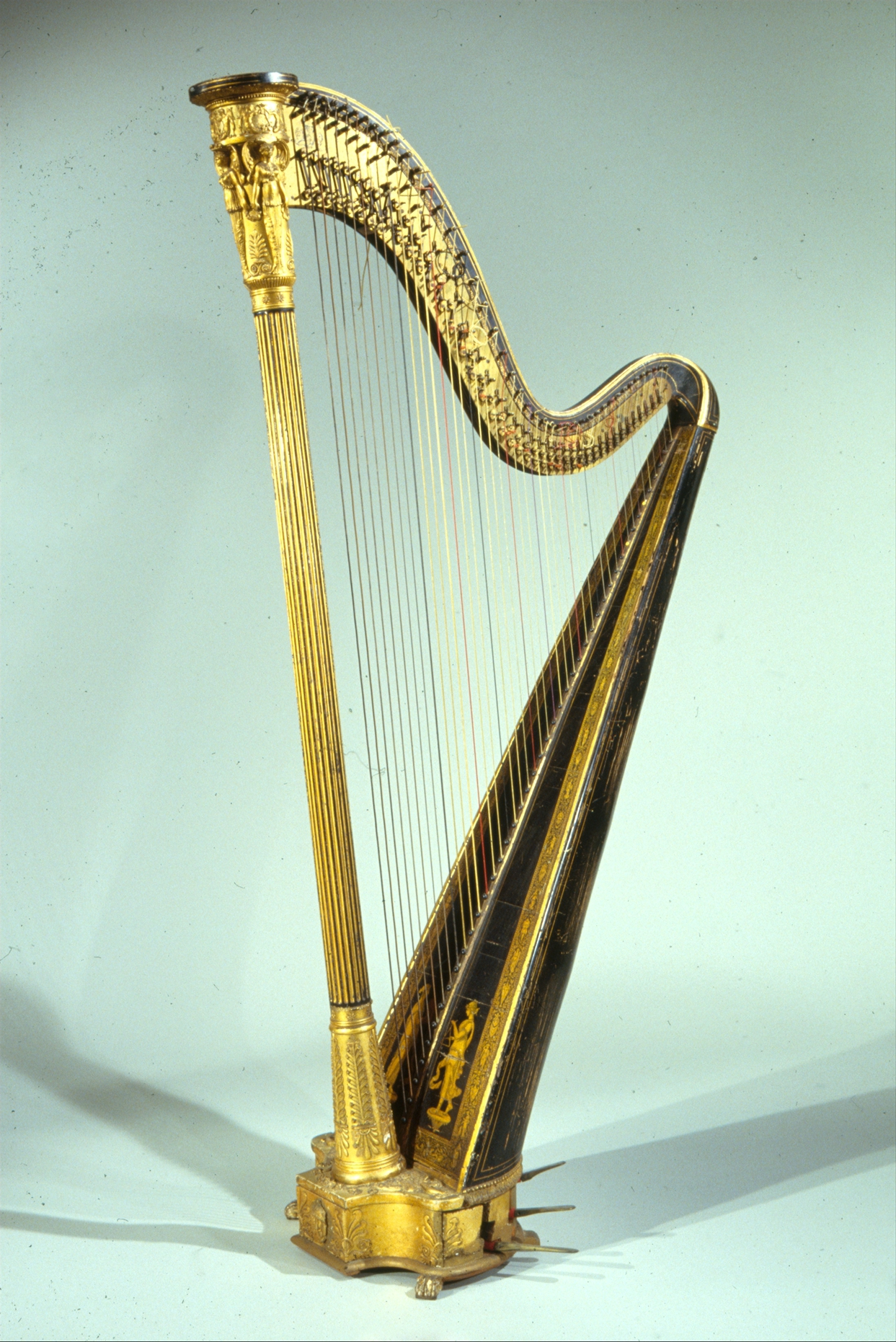
Pedal Harp that Dilling donated to the Metropolitan Museum of Art

Dilling had an extensive harp collection. She kept her harp that belonged to Evangeline Booth at home because it was too delicate to transport; it now resides in the collection of the Metropolitan Museum of Art. She also owned a harp that once belonged to Marie Antoinette. After Dilling's death in New York on December 30, 1982, Indiana University received part of her collection of 124 harps.

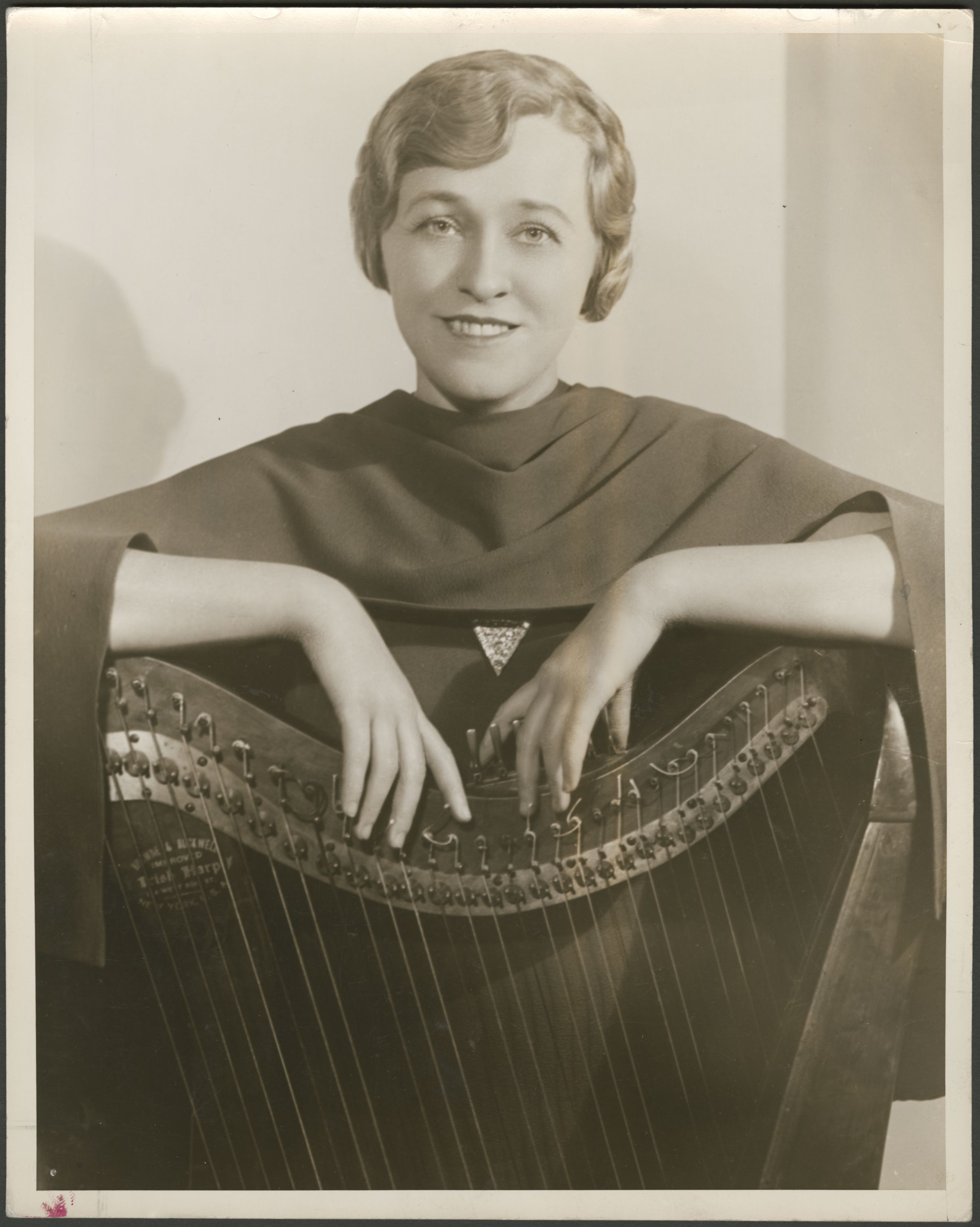
Dilling with the "Dilling" harp

In the 1920s, Dilling commissioned Browne & Buckwell to make a non-pedal harp with an "Egan-like mechanism and seven ditals". Her Celtic Single Action Harp, Dilling Model, is a non-pedal harp with seven levers on the top that control the tuning of each note in a scale individually. Dilling used this kind of harp on her first European tour. Later, around 1980, she revisited the problem of a portable harp, and collaborated with carpenters Shawn Herman, Jody Nishman, and Arsalaan Fay. Fay still makes harps with what he calls "Dilling single-action levers".

Dilling was called the "First Lady of the Harp". Harp students commonly use two of her harp music collections, Old Tunes for New Harpists (1934) and Thirty Little Classics for the Harp (1938).

== Personal life ==
Dilling was a follower of Christian Science, and as such did not drink or serve alcohol. Sometimes when staying with friends she would hide their alcohol because she felt that drinking was wrong. She once asked for a wheelchair in her travels in order to avoid carrying heavy luggage. She married banker Clinton Parker in 1943; Parker died in 1948.

Dilling once told a harpist with an infected finger and an upcoming harp concerto to perform: "Read the one hundred and twenty-first Psalm, and go on".

== Selected discography ==
Works taken from the selection in Nineteenth and Twentieth Century Harpists: A bio-critical sourcebook.

78-rpm discs for Columbia Records

- March of the Men of Harlech, John Thomas. Believe Me if All These Endearing Young Charms, old Irish Tune.
- Danse Orientale, H. Cady.
- La Source op. 44 Etude, A. Hasselmans.
- An Old Music Box; The Music Box; De Severacq, Two French Songs: Le Bon Petit Roi d'Yvetot, Et Ron, Petit Patapon Arr. M. Grandjany
- Chaconne, A. Durand, transcribed by A. Hasselmans; Menuets De Platee, J-Ph. Rameau, transcribed by G. Marty
- Bouree (from Cello suite in C-major) Bach, Bouree (from Violin Partita no. 1) Bach.
- Pastorale Op. 45 No. 5, Sibelius
- Impromptu Caprice, Op. 9 G. Pierné
- Variations Pastorales on an Old Noel, MS Rousseau

for Connoisseur Record Corp Urania

- An Evening at Town Hall with Mildred Dilling and Her Harp: de la Presle, Watkins, Renié, Ravel, Roussel, Prokofiev. John Wustman, piano. 1969.
- Romantic Music for the Harp: Debussy, Salzedo, Tournier, Renié, Liszt, Zabel, Poenitz, MacDowell, Hasselmans, Prokofiev.
