= Pearl Chertok =

American harpist (1918–1981)

Pearl Chertok (June 18, 1918, in Laconia, New Hampshire – August 1, 1981 in White Plains, New York) was an internationally regarded harpist and composer for harp.

After studying ballet, piano and flute as a child, Chertok forwent her senior year of high school to attend the Curtis Institute of Music in Philadelphia, where she studied with Marjorie Tyre and Carlos Salzedo. She then moved to New York City where she was staff harpist with the CBS Television Orchestra for many years, appearing on shows such as The Arthur Godfrey Show and Ed Sullivan's Toast of the Town.

Chertok recorded several albums, both for solo harp as well ensemble work. Her solo work included her own compositions, many of which employed an innovative jazz idiom. On her LP Strings of Pearl she was accompanied by bongo player Willie Rodriguez. Other recordings include transcriptions for harp of music by Loeillet, Purcell and others.

Chertok also convinced contemporary composers, including Elie Siegmeister, Nuncio Mondello, Edmund Haines, Sergiu Natra and William Mayer, to write for the harp. As a result, numerous pieces are dedicated to her.

Chertok was president of the American Harp Society and was on the faculty of several colleges and universities in the New York City area. Several of her students have gone on to distinguished careers as concert harpists. She served as judge at the International Harp Contest in Israel, and a prize named in her honor was awarded in 1982, 1985, 1988 and 1992.

== Dedications ==
- Mario Castelnuovo-Tedesco - Second arabesque for harp on the name of Pearl Chertok, Op. 170/45 (1967)
- Jean Françaix – Jeu poétique en six mouvements for harp and orchestra (1969)

== Discography ==
- Around the Clock Suite—Cecile Music Co., NY, PC101A
- Strings of Pearl—Audio Fidelity, AFLP 1805
- American Harp—Orion Master Recordings, ORS 75207
- The Harp in Chamber Music—Orion Master Recordings, ORS 76227
- Ancient and Modern Dances for Harp—Orion Master Recordings, ORS 76231
- Arco & Pizzicato: Music for Strings (Pearl Chertok and others) -- Serenus SRS 12062
- Castelnuovo-Tedesco: Sonata for Cello and Harp (Pearl Chertok and others) -- Lanui LAN0012
