= Sivan Magen =

Sivan Magen (born 1980) is an Israeli harpist.

Raised in Jerusalem in a musical family, the child of two cellists, Magen started his musical studies at the piano with Benjamin Oren and Talma Cohen, and first tried the harp when his family moved to France for a sabbatical. He continued his harp studies with Irena Kaganovski-Kessler in the Jerusalem Academy of Music and Dance. Later he moved to France on his own, where his teachers included Germaine Lorenzini. Magen studied at the Conservatoire National Superieure in Paris, under the guidance of Isabelle Moretti, where he was a Premier Prix winner. Magen continued his studies at the Juilliard School with Nancy Allen, and earned a master's degree. In 2006, he became the first, and to date only, Israeli to win the International Harp Contest in Israel.

In 2012, Magen won the Borletti-Buitoni Trust award. At Juilliard, Magen met fellow Israeli musicians such as pianist Assaff Weisman and clarinetist Tibi Cziger, and the three of them were among the co-founders of the Israeli Chamber Project. Magen also co-founded the chamber ensemble Tre Voci. He has taught at Brooklyn College. With the 2017–2018 season, Magen became principal harp of the Finnish Radio Symphony Orchestra. Since 2023, Magen has been professor at the renowened Hanns Eisler School of Music Berlin.

Magen has recorded commercially for Linn Records, and also for such labels as ECM and Avie.
