= Şirin Pancaroğlu =

Turkish harpist

- Born: 1968 (age 57–58); Ankara, Turkey
- Education: Geneva Convervatory; Jacobs School of Music at Indiana University Bloomington
- Known for: Harpist

Şirin Pancaroğlu (born 1968) is a Turkish harpist.

She performs both popular-folk and classical pieces. She has premiered pieces written for her by Gerardo Dirié, Franghiz Ali-Zadeh, Jeeyoung Kim, Ricardo Lorenz, Hasan Uçarsu and Meliha Doguduyal. In addition, she has been expanding her repertoire by transcribing for harp from an array of musical traditions. Over the years she has collaborated in chamber music with violinist Ignace Jang, violist Tatjana Masurenko, flutist Kornelia Brandkamp, harpist Tine Rehling and soprano Ayşe Sezerman, and recently with Israeli percussionist Yinon Muallem, creating an innovative repertoire and commissioning new music for these combinations.

== Education and family life ==
Şirin Pancaroğlu started harp in Istanbul. She grew up in Turkey, Switzerland, Indonesia, and the US. She studied harp at the Geneva Conservatory with Catherine Eisenhoffer and received her Diploma in 1988. She completed her formal education studying with Susann McDonald at the Indiana University School of Music where she received a Master of Music degree in 1992.

She is married and has a son named Mengü, born in April 2007.

== Performing career ==
Pancaroğlu has performed at venues such as the Kennedy Center in Washington, D.C., the Wolf Trap in Virginia, Konserthuset in Stockholm, Sejong Cultural Center in Seoul, Takemitsu Memorial Hall in Tokyo, the Kings Place in London, the Atatürk Cultural Center and the Cemal Reşit Rey Concert Hall in Istanbul. She performed at all the major international festivals in her homeland (Istanbul International Music Festival, International Ankara Festival, Yapı Kredi Art Festival, International Eskişehir Festival, Izmir International Festival, International Mersin Music Festival), Imagine New Music Festival in US, Belgrade Harp Festival in Serbia, Festival de la Ciudad de México in Mexico City, the Berlioz Festival, the Chirens Chamber Music Festival, the Semaines Musicales de Villeveyrac and the Trièves Festival in France.

In addition, Pancaroğlu was a concerto soloist with the Tokyo Symphony Orchestra, the European Union Chamber Orchestra, the Memphis Symphony, Washington Chamber Symphony, the Hermitage Soloists Ensemble, the Istanbul State Symphony Orchestra, the Ancyra Chamber Orchestra, and the Akbank Chamber Orchestra.

== Teaching career ==
Pancaroğlu returned to Turkey in 2000, and has been active as a soloist and teacher. She established the harp class at Yıldız Technical University’s Faculty of Art and Design and created the first-ever non-pedal harp program for children in Turkey in 2004. Invited to teach master classes in Japan, Serbia, Slovenia and in her native Turkey, Pancaroğlu is a published writer on practice techniques for harpists, an area of interest she has also lectured upon at the 9th World Harp Congress in Dublin. She performs on two Lyon & Healy Concert Grand harps made in Chicago in 1960 and 1992.

== Recordings ==
- Hasret Bağı ("A String of Longing") was released in 1998 on the Kalan Muzik label in Turkey.
- Kuyruklu Yıldız Altında ("Under the Shooting Star") features night musics for harp and violin (Ignace Jang, violin) and was released in 2000 Doublemoon Records.
- Barokarp solo release in 2005 (Triolila).
- Telveten ("String and Skin") by Kaf Müzik in 2009.
- Eski Dünya, Yeni Dünya ("Old World, New World") by AK Records in 2010.
- İstanbul’un Ses Telleri (İstanbul's Vocal Cords) by Kalan Müzik in 2010
