= Elaine Christy =

American harpist

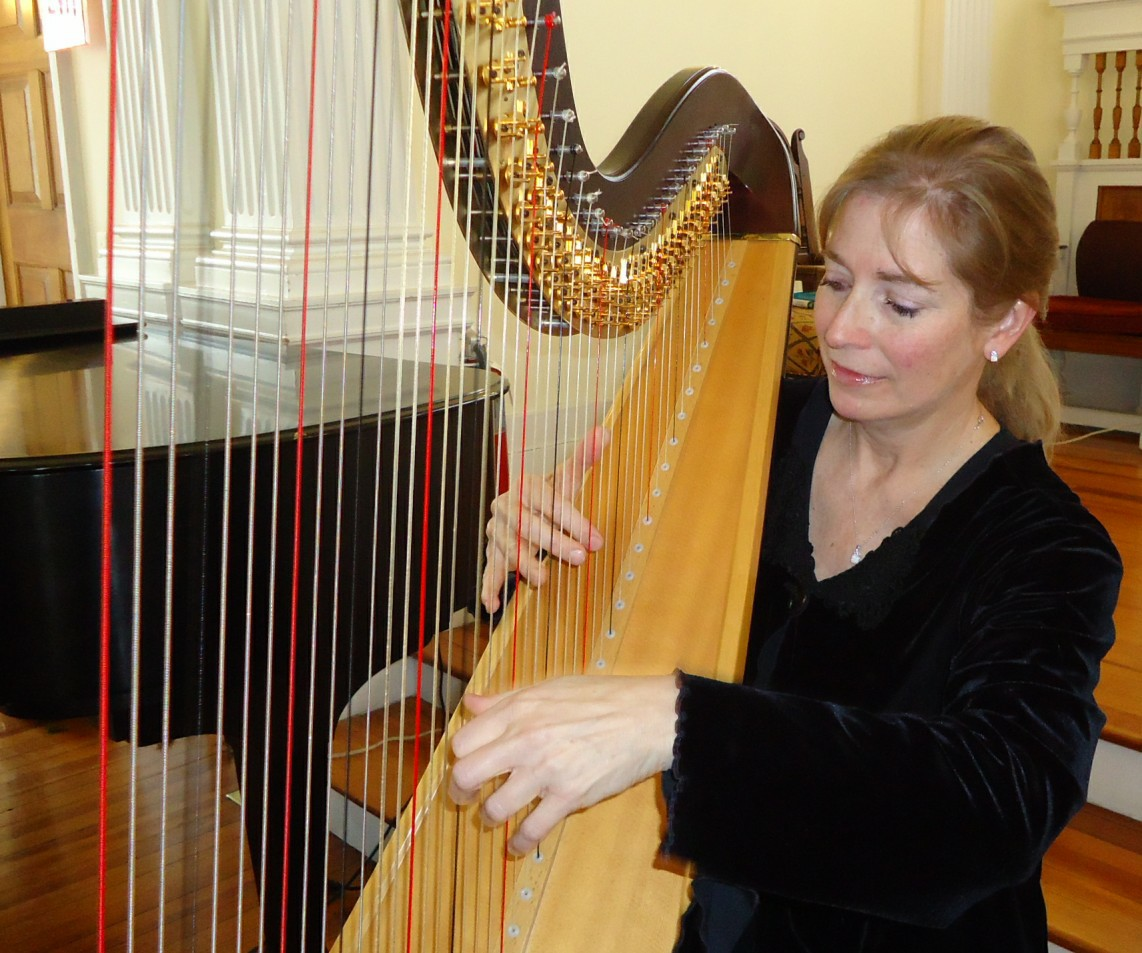
- Education: William Penn University; Manhattan School of Music
- Occupation: Professor
- Employer: Princeton University
- Awards: National harp competition, (American Harp Society); Ruth Lorraine Close (won twice); Distinguished Career Award 1998 from William Penn University; Artists International, (as part of Venus Trio)
- Website: elainechristy.com

Elaine Christy is an American harpist. She has performed at high-profile concert halls including Steinway Hall, Carnegie's Weill Hall, and with the CBS Orchestra on the television show Late Show with David Letterman. Since 2012, she is an instructor of harp at Princeton University.

== Career ==
=== Beginnings ===
Christy attended William Penn University in Oskaloosa, Iowa, United States. During these years, she studied with notable harpists including Margaret Ling, Jane Weidensaul, and Kathleen Bride. She worked as an elementary school teacher while continuing her education and training in Kansas. In 1981, she was a finalist in the professional division of the American Harp Society National Competition, and won a Lorraine Close Award during the contest. In 1984, she was placed first in the American Harp Society National Competition, and won three top awards at this competition in 1984. In addition, she won the Ruth Lorraine Close award a second time.

She earned a Ph.D. from the Manhattan School of Music. Christy was an instructor of harp at the University of Kansas and Kansas State University. Since 2001, she has taught harp at Princeton University. Her publications about harp and playing methodology have been cited by other scholars.

=== Performances and teaching ===
Christy has performed as a soloist in numerous venues. She performed at the World Harp Congress in Seattle-Tacoma in 1999 and in Geneva, Switzerland in 2002. She traveled to Israel to premier a work sponsored by Zamir Bavel. She has given numerous concerts and recitals in the New York metropolitan area, including at the Unitarian Church in Summit in New Jersey. In addition, she has performed with numerous musical artists, including violists Marjorie Selden and Jessica Thompson, and with numerous flautists including Lucian Rinando, Jill Crawford and Judith Pearce. She was a founding member of the Venus Trio which was a winner of the Artists International Competition. She has performed with the North Jersey Harp Ensemble including Kimberly DeRosa, Robbin Gordon-Cartier, Elizabeth Khoury, Diane Michaels and Kelly Rafferty. She recorded at least two music CDs. Reviewer Carol Swanson described her music as "mesmerizing". She plays with an ensemble of Princeton faculty called the Richardson Chamber Players.

Christy has served on the board of the American Harp Society. In addition, as a professor of harp, she has been published in the American Harp Journal and the World Harp Congress Review. She has taught numerous students, including harpist Allison Cheung.

=== Recordings ===
- Celestial Sounds of Christmas, Twinz Records
- Enchanted Love, with Patricia Davila (flute)
