= Marcel Grandjany =

French musician

Marcel Georges Lucien Grandjany (/ɡrænʒəˈniː/ gran-zhə-NEE) (3 September 1891 – 24 February 1975) was a French-American harpist and composer.

== Biography ==
=== Early life ===
Marcel Grandjany was born in Paris and began the study of the harp at the age of eight with Henriette Renié. At age eleven, he was admitted to the Conservatoire de Paris, where he studied with Alphonse Hasselmans, winning the coveted Premier Prix at age thirteen.

=== Career ===
At seventeen he made his debut with the Concerts Lamoureux Orchestra, and gave his first solo recital, winning immediate acclaim. He appeared with Maurice Ravel in Paris in 1913. His London debut was in 1922 and his New York debut in 1924. He appeared as soloist with major orchestras under the direction of Gabriel Pierné, Alfred Cortot, Walter Damrosch, Serge Koussevitzky, George Szell, Fritz Reiner and Vladimir Golschmann, among others.

From 1921 to 1926, he headed the harp department of the Fontainebleau Summer School. He moved to the United States in 1936 and was appointed head of the Harp Department at the Juilliard School in 1938, where he taught until his death in 1975. In 1943 he was chosen to organize the harp department of the Conservatoire de musique et d'art dramatique à Montréal, and for the next twenty years he traveled monthly from New York to Montréal. He was also head of the harp department at the Manhattan School of Music from 1956 to 1967. Notable students include American harpists Nancy Allen, Catherine Gotthoffer, and Eileen Malone. He also taught Anna Clark, the second wife of William A. Clark; she was also his patron.

At the First International Harp Contest in Israel in 1959, Pierre Jamet of France proposed the formation of an international association of harpists. Grandjany undertook to see what he could do in the United States and chaired a committee of leading harpists. The Founding Committee met for the first time on 3 December 1962 in his apartment at 235 W. 71 St, Apartment 32. Over the years, he was a member of the Board of Directors, Regional Director, Chapter Chairman and President of the New York Chapter. He generously performed at AHS conferences; in 1964 at the first conference and in 1967, a solo recital which was his last public performance. He supported the educational goals of the Society vigorously and delighted in the American Harp Society's growth and community. He died in New York City.

== Selected works ==
External audio
- You may hear Marcel Grandjany with Jean Paul Morel conducting the RCA Victor Chamber Orchestra in Handel's Concerto for Harp in B-Flat Op. 4, No. 6 in 1946; Here on Archive.org
- You may hear Marcel Grandjany performing transcriptions of works by J. S. Bach in 1958; Here on Archive.org

Concertante

- Rhapsodie on a Theme of a Gregorian Easter Chant for harp and orchestra (flute, oboe, clarinet, horn and strings), Op. 10 (1921)
- Aria in Classic Style for harp and organ (or orchestra), Op. 19 (1944)
- Poème symphonique for harp, horn and orchestra

Harp

- Trois petites pièces très faciles (3 Very Easy Little Pieces), Op. 7
1. Rêverie
2. Nocturne
3. Barcarolle
- Rhapsodie (op.10)
- Dans la forêt du charme et de l'enchantement, Conte de fée (Fairy Tale), Op. 11 (1922)
- Pièce romantique for piano, Op. 15
- Les enfants jouent (Children at Play), Op. 16
- Souvenirs, Poème, Op. 17
- Variation on the Londonderry Air, Op. 20
- Bagatelles, Op. 22
- Old Chinese Song, Op. 23
- Noël provençal, Op. 24
- Children's Hour, Suite, Op. 25
- Two Duets for 2 harps, Op. 26
1. Sally and Dinny Duet
2. Eleanor and Marcia Duet
- Harp Album, Op. 27
1. Greetings
2. Zephyr
3. In Dancing Mood
4. A Butterfly
5. Deep River Interlude for 3 harps
6. The Pageant Begins
7. On a Western Ranch
8. Through the Meadows
- The Colorado Trail, Fantaisie, Op. 28
- Divertissement, Op. 29
1. Canon
2. Fughetta
3. Final
- Fantaisie sur un thème de J. Haydn, Op. 31 (1958)
- Frère Jacques, Fantaisie, Op. 32
- The Erie Canal, Fantasy, Op. 38
- Fileuse, Op. 39
- Les cerisiers en fleurs (Cherry Blossoms), Op. 41
- Arabesque pour harpe sans pédales, No. 1 from Trois pièces pour le piano
- Automne, Pièce pour harpe (1927)
- Deux chansons populaires françaises, Easy Pieces
1. Le bon petit roi d'Yvetôt
2. Et ron ron ron, petit patapon
- 4 Études
1. Legato
2. Phrasing
3. 4th Finger
4. Rhythm
- Impromptu pour harpe sans pédales, No. 3 from Trois pièces pour le piano
- Les agneaux dansent (Dancing Lambs) for harp with or without pedals
- Little Harp Book, 8 Easy Solos for harp with or without pedals
- Pastorale pour harpe sans pédales, No. 2 from Trois pièces pour le piano
- Petite suite classique
1. Joyful Overture: In the Style of Purcell
2. Gigue: Remembrance of Kuhnau
3. Gavotte: Reverence to Lully
4. Siciliana: Aeolian Mode
5. Passepied: Homage to the Couperins
6. Bourrée: In the Style of Handel
- 3 Préludes
- Trois pièces faciles (3 Easy Pieces)
- Variations on a Prelude of J.S. Bach (1965?); after BWV 872a

Transcriptions for harp solo

- J.S. Bach - Etudes for Harp selected and transcribed from Bach's violin partitas and sonatas
- J.S. Bach - "Gigue & Preambulum, Corrente & Minuetto" selected and transcribed from Bach's Clavier partitas 1 & 5
- J.S. Bach - Praeludium transcribed from Bach's Well tempered Clavier Book 1
- J.S. Bach – Allemande
- John Bull – The King's Hunt
- François Couperin – La commère
- Manuel de Falla - Spanish Dance 1
- Antoine Francisque – Pavane et bransles from Le Trésor d'Orphée
- George Frideric Handel – Prelude and Toccata, HWV 568, 475; Saraband (HWV 455); "Concerto en si bémol & cadence originale", 1933
- Gottfried Kirchhoff – Aria and Rigaudon
- Jean-Baptiste Loeillet – Toccata
- Giovanni Battista Sammartini – Allegretto
- Franz Schubert - Ave Maria
- Ottorino Respighi - Siciliana
- Traditional [sic] – On an Old Christmas Song: "Silent Night, Holy Night" (actually by Franz Xaver Gruber and Joseph Mohr)

Vocal

- O bien aimée for voice (or melody instrument) and harp; words by Paul Verlaine
