= The International Harp Contest in Israel =

Classical music competition

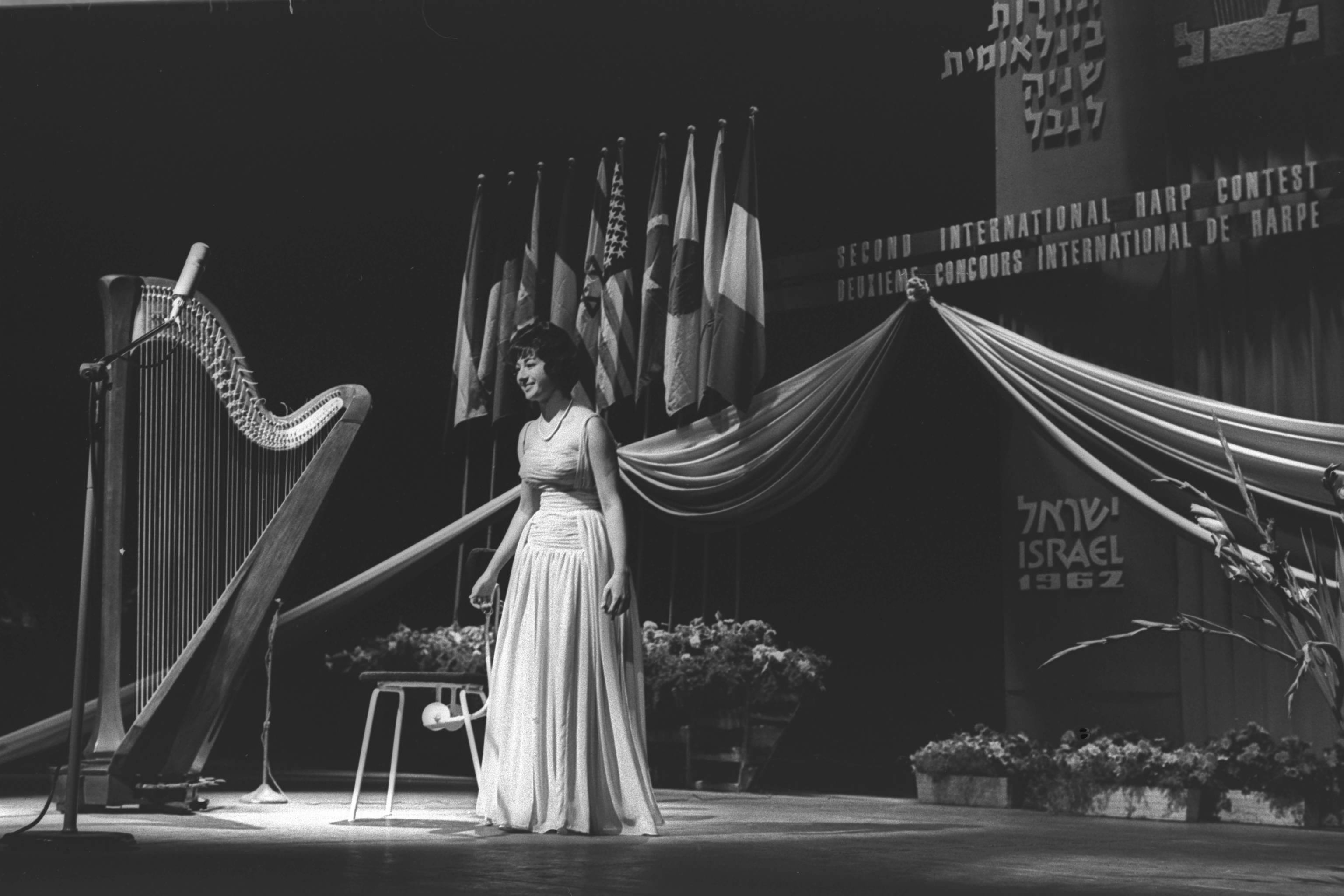
Susanna Mildonian winner of the 1st International Harp Contest in Israel, 1959

The International Harp Contest in Israel is a harp competition. Founded in 1959 by Aharon Zvi Propes in the city of Jerusalem, it was the first competition for the harp in the history of the instrument.

== Past competitions winners ==
Year	1st prize	2nd prize	3rd prize	Special prizes	Other details
1959	Susanna Mildonian, Belgium	Suzan Hacket McDonald, USA	Edward Witsenburg, Holland		
1962	Lynn Turner, United States	Guiliana Albisetti, Italy	Brigitte Deshais du Portail, France	for best performance of Toccata composed by Ami Maayani: Bogumila Lutak, Poland	
1965	Martine Géliot, France	Emilia Moskvitina, Soviet Union	Natalia Strebkova, Soviet Union		
1970	Chantal Mathieu, France	Catherine Michel, France	Ayoko Shinokazi, Japan		
1973	Nancy Allen, United States	Grace Wong, USA	Caitriona Yeats, Ireland		
1976	Ivan Ion Roncea, Romania	Frédérique Cambreling, France	Hazel Kathleen Kienzie, USA		
1979	Emily Mitchell, United States	Barbara Allen, United States	Irena Kaganovska, Israel		
1982	Alice Giles, Australia	Linda Aiella, United States and Patricia Tassini, Italy	—		
1985	Naoko Yoshino, Japan	not awarded	Ieuan Jones, Wales (UK)		
1988	Isabelle Moretti, France	Lucy Wakeford, UK	—		
1992	Marie-Pierre Langlamet, France	Yana Boushkova, Czech Republic	Mariko Anraku, Canada		
1994	not awarded	Anna Makarova, Russia	Godelive Shram, Netherlands		
1998	Gwyneth Wentink, Netherlands	Christina Bianchi, Italy	Kyo-Jin Lee, Korea		
2001	Letizia Belmondo, Italy	Jessica Li Zhou, China	Lavinia Meijer, Netherlands		
2003	Varvara Ivanova, Russia	Julie Bunzel, Israel	Albane Mahe, France	Gulbenkian prize: Etsuko Shoiji, Japan; Israeli Composition prize: Julie Bunzel, Israel; Contemporary Piece prize: Varvara Ivanova, Russia; Chamber Music prize: Julie Bunzel, Israel	
2006	Sivan Magen, Israel	Cécile Maudire, France	Etsuko Chida, Japan	Israeli Composition prize: Sivan Magen, Israel; Contemporary piece prize: Cécile Maudire, France; Mario Falcao prize: Teresa Zimmermann, Germany; Renie prize: Sivan Magen, Israel	
2009	not awarded	Ina Zdorovetchi, Moldova	Remy van Kesteren, Netherlands	Chamber Music prize: Ina Zdorovetchi, Moldova; Israeli Commissioned piece prize: Ina Zdorovetchi, Moldova; Mario Falcao prize: Remy van Kesteren, Netherlands; Renie prize: Emily Levin, United States	
2012	Anais Gaudemard, France	Agne Keblyte, Lithuania	Mai Fukui, Japan	In memory of Yona Ettinger: Anais Gaudemard, France; For best performance of R. Murray Schafer: The Crown of Ariadne: Anais Gaudemard, France; Aharon Zvi and Mara Propes Prize: Agne Keblyte; For best performance of Israeli composition by Zvi Avni, Fantasy for harp: Agne Keblite, Lithuania; Mario Falcao Prize: Mai Fukui, Japan; For best performance of a Free Choice Contemporary Work, in Stage II: Mai Fukui, Japan	Semi-Final Round Competitors: Maiko Enomoto, Japan; Stefania Saglietti, Italy; Noël Wan, USA; Second Round Competitors: Bass, Elizabeth, UK; Enomoto, Maiko, Japan; Gaudemard, Anais, France; Gott, Michelle, USA; Guiraud, Alexandra, France; Keblyte, Agne, Lithuania; Loei, Yi-Yun, Australia; Panizza, Martino, Italy; Saglietti, Stefania, Italy; Sidyagina, Oksana, Russia; Vernia, Inbar, Israel; Wan, Noel, USA; Yoon, Jane, USA; First Round Competitors: Alquati, Tatiana, Italy; Amstutz, Nathalie, Switzerland; Dimitrova, Denitza, Bulgaria; Enomoto, Maiko, Japan; Galo-Place, Claire, France; Montes, Mateo Cristina, Spain; Sato, Rieko, Japan; Scholten, Nick, The Netherlands; Shemesh, Sarah, Israel; Sidyagina, Oksana, Russia; Vreeburg, Liesbeth, The Netherlands; Widi, Rama, Indonesia; Young, Tamara, UK; Zdorovetchi, Ina, Moldova
2015	Yuying Chen, China	Anaelle Tourett, France	Eva Tomsic, Slovenia		
2018	Lenka Petrović, Serbia	Joel von Lerber, Switzerland	Marina Fradin, Israel	Semi-final prizes: Alisa Sadikova, Russia; Tjasha Gafner, Switzerland; Tatiana Repnikova, Russia; Irina Kaganovsky prize: Lenka Petrović, Serbia; Joel von Lerber, Switzerland; Nadja Dornik, Serbia; Mario Falcao Prize: Joan Rafaelle Kim, USA; Propes Prize: Joel von Lerber, Switzerland	
2021	Claudia Lucia Lamanna, Italy	Lea Maria Löffler, Germany	Beatriz Cortesão, Portugal		
