= Alphonse Hasselmans =

French harpist and composer

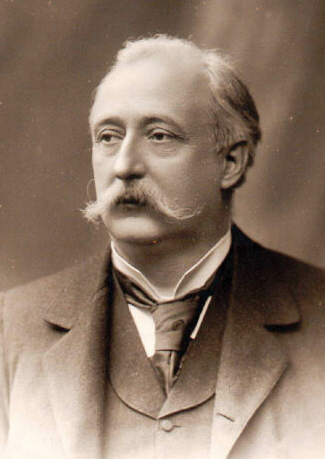
Alphonse Hasselmans, Bibliothèque nationale de France.

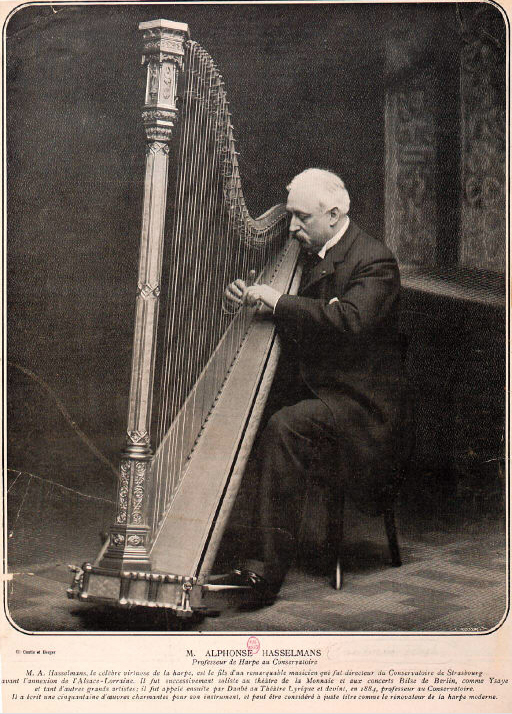
Alphonse Hasselmans, Professor of harp at the Conservatoire de Strasbourg, Bibliothèque nationale de France.

Alphonse Jean Hasselmans (5 March 1845 – 19 May 1912) was a Belgian harpist, composer, and pedagogue.

== Biography ==
Hasselmans was born in Liège, Belgium. He studied initially at the Conservatory in Strasbourg, which was led since 1854 by his father Joseph Hasselmans (1814–1902). He continued his studies with Gottlieb Krüger (1824–1895) in Stuttgart and with Ange-Conrad Prumier (1820–1884) in Paris. He began his performing career in the orchestra of the Théâtre Royal de la Monnaie in Brussels. A series of eight solo concerts in Paris in 1877 resulted in contracts for performances as a soloist with several Paris orchestras.

At the death of Prumier in 1884, Hasselsmans succeeded him as professor of harp at the Conservatoire de Paris where he had Caroline Luigini as assistant, a position he held until his sudden death in Paris at age 67. Hasselmans trained a generation of the most important French harpists of the 20th century, including Henriette Renié, Marcel Tournier, Carlos Salzedo, Marcel Grandjany, Lily Laskine, and Pierre Jamet. See: List of music students by teacher: G to J#Alphonse Hasselmans. He became a French citizen in 1903.

Hasselmans' daughter, Marguerite Hasselmans (1876–1947), was a concert pianist; she was also the mistress of Gabriel Fauré for many years. His son, Louis Hasselmans (1878–1957), was a conductor, especially of opera, whose career took him to the United States, working at the Chicago Civic Opera and the Metropolitan Opera before becoming Professor of Music at Louisiana State University.

== Compositions ==
Hasselmans composed several dozen original solos for harp, of which his most famous is a concert étude entitled La Source (The Wellspring), Op. 44. He transcribed numerous works for harp originally written for other instruments by other composers, and edited important collections of studies by the earlier 19th-century harpist Nicolas-Charles Bochsa.

== Discography ==
- Alphonse Hasselmans: Music For Harp, performed by Floraleda Sacchi, on: Brilliant Classics 94625, CD (2013). Contains: Sérénade, Op. 5; Romance, Op. 6; Patrouille, Op. 18; Gitana, Op. 21; Petite valse, Op. 25; Marguerite au rouet, ou Fileuse: Gretchen am Spinnrade, Op. 27; Au monastère, Op. 29; Mazurka, Op. 31; Menuet, Op. 34; Gondoliera, Op. 39; Chanson de mai, Op. 40; Nocturne, Op. 43; La Source, Op. 44; Follets, Op. 48; Gnomes, Op. 49; Guitare, Op. 50.
