= Marcel Tournier =

French harpist and composer (1879–1951)

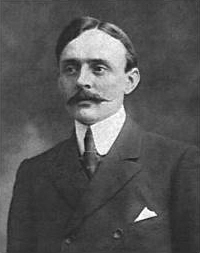
Marcel Tournier

Marcel Lucien Tournier (January 5, 1879 – May 8, 1951) was a French harpist, composer, and teacher who composed important solo repertory for the harp that expanded the technical and harmonic possibilities of the instrument. His works are regularly performed in concert and recorded by professional harpists, and they are often test pieces for harp-performance competitions. A student of Alphonse Hasselmans at the Paris Conservatory, Tournier won the Second Grand Prize of the Prix de Rome in 1909. He also won the Rossini Prize for Laura et Petrarch.

Tournier succeeded his teacher as professor of harp in 1912, holding that position until 1948, training two generations of harpists from France, the United States, other European countries, and Japan. Tournier composed several dozen solos for harp, a number of chamber works that feature the harp prominently, and a few works for piano and for orchestra. Notable students include American harpist and educator Eileen Malone.

== Family life ==
Born to a family of five brothers and two sisters, Tournier grew up around music. His father, Joseph Alexis Tournier (1842–1920), was a string instrument maker and required all of his sons to play an instrument. Tournier started young and soon became very proficient and entered the Paris Conservatoire at age 16.

His wife, Renée Lénars-Tournier (1889–1971), was professor of chromatic harp at the Paris Conservatory from 1912 to 1933. They were married in 1922.

== Works ==
Harp solo

- Quatre Suites (1897)
- Quatre Préludes, Op. 16 (1903)
- Féerie: Prélude et danse (1912)
- Air à danser. Petite pièce brève et facile (1913)
- Berceuse. Petite pièce brève et facile (1913)
- Au Matin. Étude de Concert (1913)
- Quatre Préludes (1917)
- Vers la source dans le bois (1921)
- Trois Images, suite 1, Op. 29 (1925)
- Sonatine, Op. 30 (1924)
- Trois Images, suite 2, Op. 31 (1930)
- Six Noëls, Op. 32 (1926)
- Jazz-band, Op. 33 (1926)
- Trois Images, suite 3, Op. 35
- Berceuse russe (1932)
- Scherzo romantique, Op. 38 (1932)
- Trois Images, suite 4, Op. 39
- Pièces nègres, Op. 41 (1935)
- Encore une boîte à musique, Op. 43 (1935)
- Pastels du vieux Japon, Op. 47 (1948)
- Au hasard des ondes, Op. 50 (1953)

Piano solo

- Cortège (1912)
- Deux Esquisses (1914)
- Du côté de la mer, Op. 26 (c.1925)
- Deuxième valse, Op. 27 (c.1925)

Violin and piano (or harp)

- Chanson folle, Op. 18 (1903)
- Deux Préludes romantiques, Op. 17 (1909)
- Sérénade (1911)
- Promenade à l'automne (1912) (also designated for cello and harp)

Chamber music

- Suite (1929) for flute, violin, viola, cello, harp or piano

Vocal music

- La lettre du jardinier (ca.1918) for voice (soprano) and harp or piano (poem by Henry Bataille)
