= List of compositions for harp =

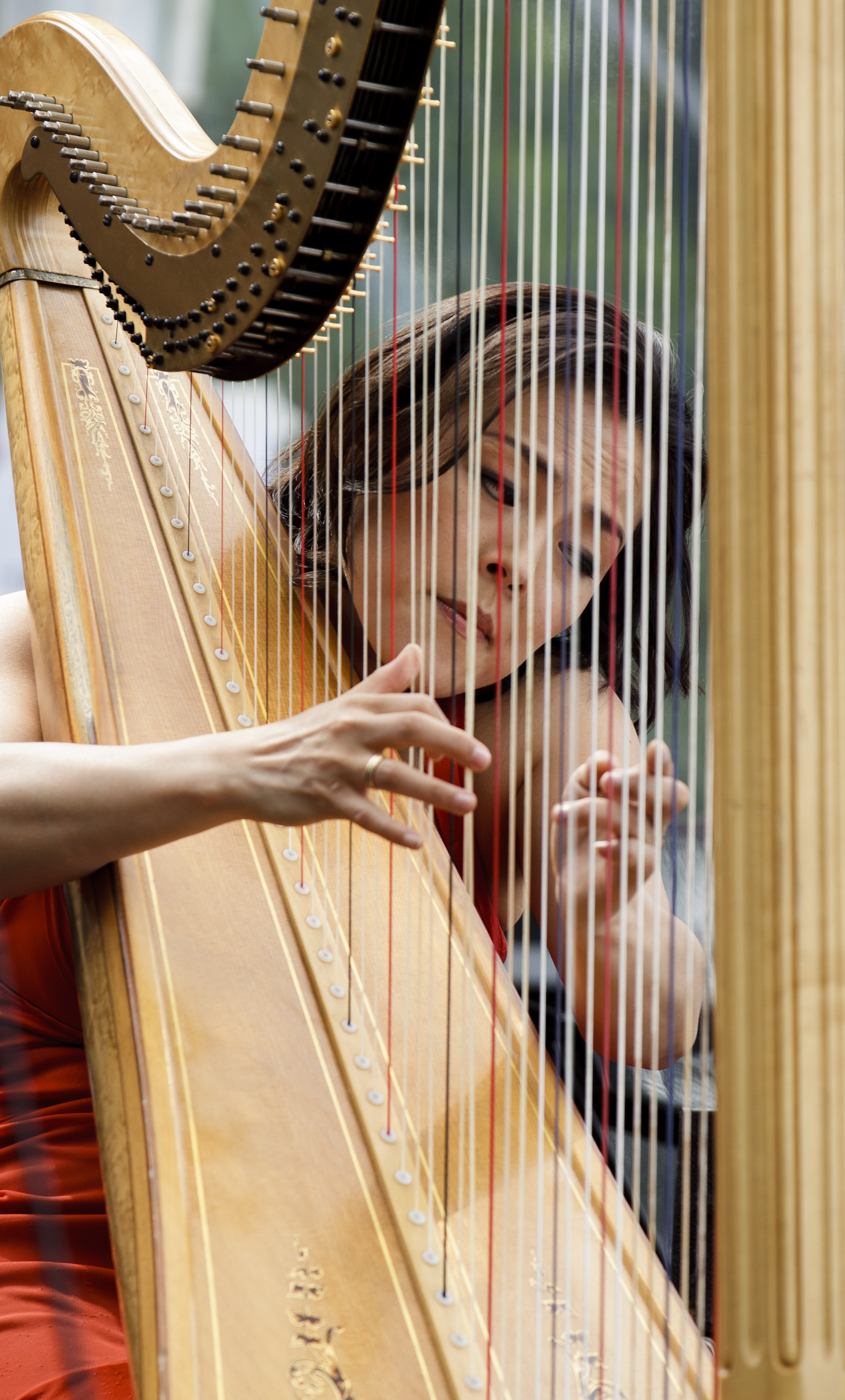
Lavinia Meijer playing the harp

The following is a non-exhaustive list of compositions for harp.

== Solo works ==
- Elias Parish Alvars
  - Introduction, Cadenza & Rondo
  - La Mandoline, Op.84
  - Fantaisie sur Lucia di Lammermoor
  - Lucia di Lammermoor Fantasia No. 2, Op 79
  - Fantasia on Themes from Oberon
  - Grand Study in Imitation of the Mandoline
  - "Hebrew Air", from Voyage No. 3
  - "Chanson grec", from Voyage No. 6
  - "Sultan's Parade", from Voyage No. 3
  - La Danse des fées, Op 76
  - Marche favorite du Sultan
  - "Prayer" from Mosè in Egitto
  - Serenade, Op. 83
  - Romance No. 1
  - Romance No. 2
  - over 80 pieces
- Carl Philipp Emanuel Bach
  - Sonata for Harp in G major, Wq.139
- Ludwig van Beethoven
  - Six Variations on a Swiss Song, WoO 64 (for harp or piano, composed before 1793)
- Luciano Berio
  - Sequenza II (1963)
- François-Adrien Boieldieu
  - Harp Sonata (1795)
- Nimrod Borenstein
  - Etude Poème opus 8 (1995)
  - Nocturne opus 46 (2007)
- Hélène Breschand
  - Improvisation I, II and III (1998)
  - Minotaure (2006)
  - La Sibylle (2017)
  - Pandora (2019)
  - Amor (2021)
  - Hécate (2021)
  - Némésis (2026)
- Benjamin Britten
  - Suite for Harp (1969)
  - A Ceremony of Carols (harp accompanies SSA choir)
  - Canticle V: The Death of Saint Narcissus (harp accompanies tenor)
  - A Birthday Hansel (harp accompanies high voice)
- David Bruce
  - Caja de Musica (2009)
- Howard J. Buss
  - Awakening (2010)
  - Vega of Lyra "The Harp Star" (2013)
- Gary Schocker (b. 1959)
  - Garden in Harp
- Garrett Byrnes (b. 1971)
  - Valley of Butterflies (2011)
  - Sizzle (2009)
  - Amhrán Slán (2001)
  - Visions in Twilight (2000)
- André Caplet
  - Déchiffrage (1910)
  - Divertissement à la française (1924)
  - Divertissement à l'espagnole (1924)
- Elliott Carter
  - Bariolage (1992)
- Julian Cochran
  - Four Preludes and Nocturne for Concert Harp
  - Two Valses for Concert Harp
- David Conte
  - Marian Variations (2006)
- Carson Cooman
  - Sun Figment for Harp (2002)
- Jean Cras
  - Deux Impromptus pour harpe (1925)
- Jean-Michel Damase
  - Aubade
  - Introduction et Toccata
  - Pluie
  - Sarabande
  - Sicilienne variée
  - Tango pour harpe
  - Thème et variations
  - Thirty Etudes
- Jan Ladislav Dussek
  - Sonata with 'The Lass of Richmond Hill' in F, C. 183 (c.1800)
  - Three Sonatas (1797), possibly by Sophia Dussek
    - No. 1 in B♭, C. 12
    - No. 2 in G, C. 13
    - No. 3 in C minor, C. 14
  - Six Sonatinas (1799), definitely by J.L. Dussek
    - No. 1 in C, C. 160
    - No. 2 in F, C. 161
    - No. 3 in G, C. 162
    - No. 4 in B♭, C. 163
    - No. 5 in F, C. 164
    - No. 6 in E♭, C. 165
- Gabriel Fauré
  - Impromptu, Op. 86 (1904)
  - Une châtelaine en sa tour, Op. 110 (1918)
- Graham Fitkin
  - Skirting (2004)
  - Scent for Wire Harp (2007)
- Peggy Glanville-Hicks
  - Harp Sonata (1953)
- Félix Godefroid
  - Carnaval de Venise, Op.184
  - La danse des Sylphes
  - Etude de concert, Op. 193
  - Le coucou
  - La harpe éolienne
- Alphonse Hasselmans
  - Gitana, Op. 21
  - La Source, Op. 44
  - Three Préludes, Opp. 51–3
- Patrick Hawes
  - How Hill (2009)
- Paul Hindemith
  - Harp Sonata (1939)
- Alan Hovhaness
  - Nocturne (1935; rev. 1959)
  - Harp Sonata (1954)
  - Suite for Harp (1973)
- Bertold Hummel
  - Gregorian Fantasy for Harpe solo op. 97b (1994)
- Louis-Emmanuel Jadin
  - Fantaisie Concertante in G for harp, piano and orchestra
- Karel Janovický
  - Sonata for Harp (2000)
- Valeri Kikta
  - Ossian, suite for harp (1965)
  - Four poems of Osman (1969)
  - Two Pieces (1972)
  - Romantic Variations on a Theme by Lyudkevich (1978)
  - Sonata No. 1 Sonata Lamentosa (1980)
  - Sonata No. 2 Bylina Scales in E♭ major (1982)
  - Fantasy on themes from P.I. Tchaikovsky's 'Pique Dame' (1982)
  - At the Smoldering Chimney, fantasy for harp (1983)
- Jean-Baptiste Krumpholz
  - Harp Sonata, Op. 10 (c.1787)
  - Four Sonates non difficiles with optional violin or cello, Op. 12 (c.1787)
  - Four Sonates chantantes with optional violin, Op.16 (c1788), no.3 ed. in T-B
  - Recueil de douze préludes et petits airs, Op. 2 (c. 1776)
  - Duo for two harps, Op. 5 (c. 1777)
  - Recueil contenant différens petits airs variés, 1 sonata and 1 petit duo for two harps, Op. 10 (c. 1787)
- Théodore Labarre
  - Méthode complète pour le harpe (1844)
  - Fantaisies on operatic themes after Donizetti, Rossini and others
  - Numerous concert works
- Fabien Lévy
  - Les deux ampoules d'un sablier peu à peu se comprennent
- Peter Machajdík
  - Nell'autunno del suo abbraccio insonne (2003)
  - Flower full of Gardens (2010)
  - Ulity (2014)
  - Rivers Connect (2019)
  - Benefits of Breathing (2020)
- Fabio Mengozzi
  - Arabesque (2011)
  - Diario d'arpa (2011)
  - Poema della trasmigrazione (2012)
  - Romanza al cielo (2012)
  - Rosa (2012)
  - Crux (2012)
  - Novella (2013)
  - Moto fluttuante (2014)
  - Primavera, stormi frementi nel silenzio del tramonto (2021)
  - Estate, luce di stelle nella notte (2021)
  - Autunno, petali sopiti nel vento (2021)
  - Inverno, neve cadente nel gelo dell'alba (2021)
- Shai Cohen
  - Nuance for Harp and Live electronics (2011)
  - I saw a rainbow in a puddle for amplified Harp and live electronics (2019)
- Sergiu Natra
  - Sonatina
  - Prayer
  - A Book of Hebrew Songs
  - Ballade millenaire
  - Cantosonata (2011)
- Lior Navok
  - East of the Cane Fields
- Charles Oberthür
  - Reminiscences de Suisse, Op. 3
  - Souvenir de Genève, Op. 4
  - Souvenir de Londres. Fantaisie et variations brillantes sur un thême original, Op. 26
  - Souvenir de Boulogne. Nocturne, Op. 30
  - La Belle Emmeline. Impromptu, Op. 51
  - Trois Mélodies religieuses, Op. 52
  - Gems of German Songs. Twelve Recreations, Op. 61
  - Le Désir, Op. 65
  - Au bord de la mer. Nocturne, Op. 68
  - Bel chiaro di luna. Impromptu, Op. 91
  - La Sylphide. Morceau caractéristique, Op. 150
  - Seaside Rambles. Four Musical Sketches, Op. 158
  - Le Réveil des elfes. Morceau caractéristique, Op. 181
  - A Fairy Legend, Op. 182
  - Erin, oh! Erin! Mélodie irlandaise favorite, Op. 183
  - Conte de fées. Caprice, Op. 301
  - Le Papillon. Caprice, Op. 317
- Henri O'Kelly
  - Prélude pour harpe chromatique (1900)
  - Rêverie pastorale (1900)
- Francesco Petrini
  - Sonatas for harp (violin ad lib)
    - 6 as Op. 1 (1769)
    - 6 as Op. 3
    - 2 as Op. 4
    - Third book, Op. 9
    - Fourth Book, Op. 10 (c.1780)
    - 1 as Op. 39
    - 4 as Op. 40 (1801)
  - Airs with variations
    - First collection, Op. 2 (1774)
    - Second collection, Op. 8 (1774)
    - Seventh collection, Op. 15 (1779)
    - Op. 16 (1779)
    - Op. 17 (c. 1780–5)
  - Airs, ouvertures, sonata movements, published in Delamanière at Delaplanque (c.1790)
  - Variations on 'Le Réveil du peuple de Gaveaux', 'Vive Henri IV', 'Bataille du Wagram', etc. published separately
- Gabriel Pierné
  - Impromptu-caprice, Op. 9 (1885)
- Anna-Maria Ravnopolska-Dean
  - Improvisation (2003)
  - The Turtle's Castle (2003)
  - Four Compositions for Harp on Haiku Poetry (2003)
  - Suite of 8 Dances: Laendler, Tango, Fandango, Horo, Kazachok, Arabian dance, Pavane (2004)
  - Fantasy on Verdi's Opera 'La Traviata' (2005)
  - Two Haiku Pieces on Basho (2006)
  - The Mystic Trumpeter (2006)
  - Five Haiku Pieces 'Solo Honkadorae Renga' (2006)
- Henriette Renié
  - Contemplation (1902)
  - Concerto pour harpe et orchestre (in C minor) (1901)
  - Légende d'après 'Les Elfes' de Leconte de Lisle
  - Six Pièces (Conte de Noël, Recueillement, Air de danse, Invention dans le Style ancien, Rêverie, Gavotte)
  - Contemplation
  - Danse des lutins
  - Feuillets d'album (Esquisse, Danse d'autrefois, Angelus)
  - Pièce symphonique en trois episodes
  - Promenade matinale, deux pièces pour Harpe
  - Deux pièces symphoniques (Élégie, Danse caprice)
  - Ballade fantastique d'après 'Le Cœur révélateur' d'Edgar Poë)
  - 2e Ballade pour harpe
  - Andante Religioso
- Marcel Grandjany
  - Rhapsodie pour la harpe(1922 or earlier)
- Joaquín Rodrigo
  - Impromptu (1959)
- Nino Rota
  - Sarabanda e Toccata
  - Sonata
- Albert Roussel
  - Impromptu, Op. 21 (1919)
- John Rutter
  - Many choral hymns and anthems with harp accompaniment, w/w/o orchestral accompaniment
- Kaija Saariaho
  - Fall (Maa)
- Camille Saint-Saëns
  - Fantaisie, Op. 95
- Salvatore Sciarrino
  - Addio a Trachis
- Leon Schidlowsky
  - Five Pieces for Harp
- Michael Seltenreich
  - Inertia for Harp
- Dave Smith
  - A propos de rien (1999)
- Juan María Solare
  - White horse falling asleep (2012)
  - Progressive Empathy (2022)
- Louis Spohr
  - Fantasia in C minor, Op. 35 (1807)
  - Variations on Méhul's 'Je suis encore dans mon printemps', Op. 36 (1807)
  - Variations in E, WoO 29 (1808), lost
- Germaine Tailleferre
  - Le Petit livre de harpe de Madame Tardieu
  - Sonate
  - Sonata alla Scarlatti
- Josef Tal
  - Intrada (1959)
  - Structure (1961)
  - Concerto for harp & electronic music (1971/1980)
  - Dispute (1989)
- Marcel Tournier
  - Berceuse
  - Berceuse Russe, Op. 40
  - Ce que chante la pluie d'automne, Op. 49
  - Deux Petites pièces
  - Deuxième Sonatine, Op. 45
  - Encore une Bôite à Musique, Op. 43
  - Étude de concert (Au matin)
  - Féerie
  - Fresque Marine, Op. 46
  - Images, Op. 29 Suite 1
  - Images, Op. 31 Suite 2
  - Images, Op. 35 Suite 3
  - Images, Op. 39 Suite 4
  - Jazz Band, Op. 33
  - Pièces nègres, Op. 41
  - Quatre Préludes, Op. 16
  - Six Noëls, Op. 32
  - Sonatine, Op. 30
  - Thème et variations
  - Vers la source dans le bois

== Two or more harps ==
- Alan Hovhaness
  - Island of the Mysterious Bells (4 harps)
- Peter Machajdík
  - Whilst You Dreamt (2003)
- Fabio Mengozzi
  - Symbolon (two harps)
- Francesco Petrini
  - Duo for two harps (or harp and piano), Op. 7 (1773?)
  - Duo for two harps (violin, basso continuo, ad lib), Op. 31
- Timothy Salter
  - Three Intermezzi (two harps)

Carlos Salzedo

- Pentangle (two harps)
- Juan María Solare
  - Plenitude in rotation (four harps) (2012)

Karlheinz Stockhausen

  - Freude (Joy), for two harps (Klang: zweite Stunde, 2005)
- John Thomas
  - Scenes of Childhood, for 2 harps (1863)
  - Cambria, for 2 harps (1863)
- Marcel Tournier
  - Quatre Préludes, Op. 16 (2 harps)
- Sergiu Natra
  - Sonata for Four Harps
- Leon Schidlowsky
  - Duetto

== Chamber works ==
- William Alwyn
  - Suite for Oboe and Harp (1944)
- Stefan Beyer
  - Die schreien Salz, for bassoon, trumpet, trombone, percussion, harp, violin, and violoncello (2008/2009)
- François-Adrien Boieldieu
  - Duos for harp and piano
    - No. 1 (1796)
    - No. 2 (1796)
    - No. 3 (c.1800), lost
  - Air and nine variations for harp and piano (1803), lost
- Jeremy Beck
  - Ghosts for flute and harp (1985)
  - Sonata for flute, violin, cello and harp (1986)
  - Songs Without Words for flute and harp (1998)
- Joseph Bologne, Chevalier de Saint-Georges
  - Sonata for flute and harp
- Howard J. Buss
  - Alpine Spring for flute and harp (2008)
  - Inner Quest for flute and harp (2011)
  - Saint Francis and the Animals for flute, clarinet and harp (2013)
  - Seaside Reflections for flute and harp (1993)
  - Seaside Reflections for oboe and harp (1993)
  - Seaside Reflections for clarinet and harp (2011)
  - Zoom for bass trombone (or tuba) and harp (2011)
- Garrett Byrnes; (b. 1971);
  - Moon Songs for soprano and harp (2011)
  - Villanelle for violin and harp (2006)
- Elliott Carter
  - Trilogy for oboe and harp (1992)
  - Luimen for trumpet, trombone, vibraphone, mandolin, guitar, and harp (1997)
  - Mosaic for flute (doubling piccolo and alto flute), oboe (doubling English horn), clarinet (doubling bass clarinet), harp, violin, viola, cello, and double bass (2004)
  - Trije glasbeniki for flute, bass clarinet, and harp (2011)
- Jeremy Cavaterra
  - Trio for Harp, Flute, and Viola (2012)
  - Capriccio Concertante for clarinet, string quartet, bass, and harp (2017)
- Julian Cochran
  - Artemis for violin, cor anglais and harp
- Jean Cras
  - Quintette pour harpe, flûte, violon, alto et violoncelle (1928)
- Jean-Michel Damase
  - Trio for flute, cello and harp (1947)
  - Trio for flute, viola and harp (1947)
  - Quintet for flute, harp and string trio, Op. 2 (1948)
  - Sonata for clarinet and harp (1984)
  - Second Sonata for flute and harp
  - Adage for trumpet and harp
- Claude Debussy
  - Music for Chansons de Bilitis for two flutes, two harps, and celesta, L. 96 (1900-1)
  - Danses sacrée et profane for harp and string quintet, L. 103 (1904)
  - Sonata for harp, flute, and viola, L. 137 (1915)
  - Trio Sonata for flute, viola, and harp (2012)
- Joël-François Durand
  - Le Tombeau de Rameau for flute, viola and harp (2008)
- Jan Ladislav Dussek
  - Duo in F for harp and piano, C. 63 (c.1789)
  - Duetto in F for harp and piano, C. 102 (1794)
  - Two pieces for harp, violin, and cello (1797)
    - No. 1 in E♭, C. 147
    - No. 2 in B♭, C. 148
  - Duet in E♭ for harp and piano, C. 170 (1799)
  - Two Duettinos for harp and piano (c.1802)
    - No. 1 in C, C. 189
    - No. 2 in F, C. 190
  - Three Duos concertants for harp and piano
  - No. 1 in B♭, C. 234 (1810)
  - No. 2 in E♭, C. 239 (1811)
  - No. 3 in F, C. 243 (1811)
- Vladimír Godár
  - Barcarolle, for violin (or cello), strings, harp and harpsichord (1993/1995)
  - La Canzona refrigerativa dell arpa di Davide (David's Refreshing Harp Song), for cello & harp (1999)
- Sofia Gubaidulina
  - Garden of Joy and Sorrow, for harp, flute and viola
- Lou Harrison
  - The Perilous Chapel, for harp, flute, cello and percussion (1948)
- Patrick Hawes
  - Earth Rise (2011) for harp and oboe
  - Reflexionem (2006) for harp and cello
- Gilad Hochman
  - Prayer without Words for soprano saxophone and Harp (2018)
- Arthur Honegger
  - Petite suite for flute, viola and harp
- Alan Hovhaness
  - The World Beneath the Sea
    - No. 1, for harp, alto saxophone, vibraphone, timpani and gong (1954)
    - No. 2, for harp, clarinet, timpani bells (chimes or glockenspiel), and double bass (1963)
  - Koke no Niwa, for English horn (or B♭ clarinet), 2 percussion and harp (1954; rev. 1960)
  - The Garden of Adonis, for flute and harp (or piano) (1971)
  - Firdausi, for clarinet, harp and percussion (1972)
  - Spirit of Tress, for harp and guitar (1983)
  - Starry Night, for flute, xylophone and harp
  - Sonata for flute and harp (1987)
  - Sno Qualmie, for harp, clarinet, timpani, chimes, and double bass
  - Upon Enchanted Ground, Op.90, No.1, for flute, cello, giant tamtam and harp
- Bertold Hummel
  - Duo concertante for Harp and Violoncello Op.33 (1968)
- Airat Ichmouratov
  - Trio for Harp, Viola and Flute "Fujin's Dream" Op.58 (2018)
- Nigel Keay
  - Terrestrial Mirror for flute, viola & harp (2005)
- Valeri Kikta
  - Antique Visions for clarinet and harp (1977)
  - Sonata for violin and harp (1998)
- Jean-Baptiste Krumpholz
  - 6 harp sonatas with violin, Op. 1 (c.1775)
  - 4 harp sonatas with violin, double bass, and two horns, Op. 3 (c.1776)
  - 6 harp sonatas, Op. 8 (c. 1780), nos. 1–5 with violin or flute
  - Collection de pièces de différens genres distribuées en 6 sonates with piano, Opp. 13–14 (c.1788)
  - 4 Sonates en forme de scènes de différens caractères with piano, Op. 15 (c.1788)
  - 3 Sonates … dont la 1er en forme de scène with violin, Op. 17 (c.1789)
  - 2 Sonates en forme de scènes with piano, Op. 18 (c.1789)
  - Andante for harp and violin, Op. 19 (c.1789)
- Théodore Labarre
  - Duos for harp and horn
  - Trios for harp, horn, and bassoon, Op. 6
  - Grand duo du couronnement for harp and piano, Op. 104 (1841)
  - Numerous salon pieces for harp and piano
  - Romance for violin and harp
- Lowell Liebermann
  - Sonata for flute and harp, Op. 56 (1996)
- Raymond Luedeke
  - The Moon in the Labyrinth for harp and string quartet (or string orch.)
  - The Lyre of Orpheus for harp and string quartet (or for harp duo)
  - Fairy Tales for harp and flute (also piccolo)
  - Five Pieces for harp, flute, and cello
  - Aurora for flute and harp
- Bohuslav Martinů
  - Musique de Chambre No. 1 (clarinet, violin, viola, cello, piano)
- Felix Mendelssohn
  - The Evening Bell in B♭ for harp and piano MWV Q 20 (1829)
- Fabio Mengozzi
  - Phoenix (violin and harp)
  - Ousia (harp and piano)
  - Ousia II (flute, cello, harp, piano)
  - Auriga (harp and piano)
- Sergiu Natra
  - Music For Violin and Harp
  - Music For Harp and Three Brass Instruments (trumpet, trombone, & French horn)
  - Music for Nicanor (harp, flute, clarinet & string quartet)
  - Commentaires sentimentaux (flute, viola and harp)
  - Two Sacred Songs (soprano, violin, cello, harp & organ)
  - Ancient Walls (trombone & harp)
  - Ancient Walls (horn & harp)
  - Trio in One Movement nr. 2 (2 French horns & harp)
  - Deux poemes (voice & harp)
  - Sonata for Harp and String Quartet
  - Divertimento for Harp and String Quartet with D.B.
  - Divertimento for Harp and String Quartet without D.B.
  - Divertimento for Harp and String Orch.
- Lior Navok
  - Al Mishkavi Baleylot, for soprano and harp
  - Quartet for flute, clarinet, bassoon and harp
  - Veiled Echoes, for flute, viola and harp
  - Seven Haiku, for flute (or alto flute) and harp
- Charles Oberthür
  - Souvenir à Schwalbach, Op. 42 for horn and harp
  - Mon séjour à Darmstadt, Op. 90 for horn and harp
  - Trio, Op. 139 for violin, cello, harp
  - Trio, Op. 162 for violin, cello, harp (1867)
  - Orpheus, Op. 253 for harp and piano
  - Sweet Dreams, Op. 300 for clarinet and piano
- Elias Parish Alvars
  - Grande fantaisie brillante for harp and piano (1838), based on themes from Anna Bolena, La sonnambula and Lucia di Lammermoor, composed with Carl Czerny
- Francesco Petrini
  - Airs with variations
    - Third collection (1774) for harp, violin, and oboe
    - Fourth and fifth collections, Opp. 12–13 (c. 1778) for harp, violin, and oboe
    - Sixth collection, Op. 14 (1778) for harp, bassoon, and cello
  - 3 preludes for harp and basso continuo
- Maurice Ravel
  - Introduction and Allegro for harp, flute, clarinet, and string quartet (1905)
- Albert Roussel
  - Sérénade for flute, string trio, and harp, Op. 30 (1925)
- Camille Saint-Saëns
  - Fantasie for violin and harp, Op. 124
- Timothy Salter
  - Mosaics for flute/picolo, viola and harp
- Carlos Salzedo
  - The Enchanted Isle (1918)
  - Harp Concerto No. 1 (1926)
  - Harp Concerto No. 2 (1953)
- Leo Smit
  - Trio pour Flute, Alto et harpe
- Dave Soldier
  - Dean Swift's Satyrs for the Very Very Young for harp, viola, flute and voice (2011)
- Louis Spohr – in many of these works, the harp was to be tuned down a semitone and the music written a semitone higher
  - Sonatas for harp and violin
    - No. 1 in C minor, WoO 23 (1805)
    - No. 2 in B♭, Op. 16 (1806)
    - No. 3 in E minor/F minor, WoO 27 (c.1806)
    - No. 4 in D/E♭, Op. 113 (1806)
    - No. 5 in D/E♭, Op. 114 (1811)
    - No. 6 in G/A♭, Op. 115 (1809)
    - No. 7 in G/A♭, WoO 36 (1819), lost
  - Sonata movement for harp and violin in G, WoO 24 (1805), incomplete
  - Introduction in G for harp and violin, WoO 25 (1805)
  - Trio in E minor/F minor for violin, cello, and harp, WoO 28 (1806)
  - Rondo in E minor/F minor for violin, cello, and harp, WoO 33 (1813), lost
  - Fantasia on Themes by Handel and Vogler in B minor/C minor–A/B♭, Op. 118 (1814)
- William Grant Still
  - Ennanga, for harp, string quintet, and piano (1956)
- Igor Stravinsky
  - Epitaphium for flute, clarinet, and harp (1959)
- Toru Takemitsu
  - Eucalypts II, for flute, oboe and harp (1971)
  - "Rain Spell", for piano, harp, vibrafone, clarinet and flute (1980)
  - Toward the Sea III, for alto flute and harp (1989)
  - And then I knew 'twas Wind, for flute, viola and harp (1992)
- Josef Tal
  - Lament, for violoncello & harp (1947)
  - Hora, for violoncello & harp (1949)
  - Duo for trombone & harp (1989)
- Marcel Tournier
  - Nocturne (cello, harp and organ)
  - La Lettre du jardinier (high voice and harp)
  - Deux préludes romantiques Op. 17 (violin and harp)
- Heitor Villa-Lobos
  - Sextuor mystique, for flute, oboe, alto saxophone, harp, guitar and celesta (1917)
  - Quatuor, for flute, alto saxophone, harp, celesta and women's voices (1921)
  - Nonetto, for flute, oboe, clarinet, alto saxophone, bassoon, harp, piano, celesta, percussion and mixed choir (1923)
  - Quintette instrumental, for flute, harp and string trio (1953)

== Concertante works ==
=== Concertos ===
- Mark Adamo
  - Four Angels: Concerto for Harp and Orchestra (2007)
- Kalevi Aho
  - Mearra, chamber concerto for harp and 13 strings (2016)
- Johann Georg Albrechtsberger
  - 4 harp concertinos (1772)
  - Harp Concerto (1773)
- Elias Parish Alvars
  - Three concertos
  - Two concertinos, one for solo harp, one for two harps
- William Alwyn
  - Lyra Angelica, concerto for harp and string orchestra (1954)
- Henk Badings
  - Harp Concerto (1967)
- Nicolas-Charles Bochsa
  - Concerto militar
  - Concerto pour harpe et orchestre No. 1 en ré mineur, Op. 15
- François-Adrien Boieldieu
  - Harp Concerto in C Major (1801)
- Ann Carr-Boyd
  - Fantasy for Harp and Orchestra (1996)
- Paul Constantinescu
  - Harp Concerto
- Barry Conyngham
  - Cloudlines: Concerto for harp and orchestra (1990)
- Henry Cowell
  - Harp Concerto, L. 947 (1965)
- Jean-Michel Damase
  - Ballade pour harpe et orchestre à cordes
  - Concertino pour harpe et instruments à cordes
- Carl Ditters von Dittersdorf
  - Concerto for Harp
- Ernő Dohnányi
  - Concertino for harp and chamber orchestra (1952)
- Jan Ladislav Dussek
  - Harp Concerto in E♭, C. 53/265 (1789)
  - Harp Concerto in F, C. 78/266 (1792)
  - Harp Concerto in C, C. 129/267 (1795)
  - The Favourite Concerto in F, C. 158 (1798?)
  - Harp Concerto in B♭, C. 264 (1813), lost
- Ernst Eichner
  - Harp Concerto in C (1769)
  - Harp Concerto in D (1771?)
- Alberto Ginastera
  - Harp Concerto, Op. 25 (1956)
- Reinhold Glière
  - Harp Concerto in E♭, Op. 74 (1938)
- Inglis Gundry
  - Harp Concerto (1973)
- Radamés Gnattali
  - Concerto for harp and string orchestra (1957)>
- George Frideric Handel
  - Concerto in B♭ major for harp and orchestra, Op. 4, No. 6, HWV 294 (1738)
- Patrick Hawes
  - Highgrove Suite for harp and string orchestra
- Jennifer Higdon
  - Harp Concerto (2018)
- Joe Hisaishi
  - Harp Concerto (2024)
- Alun Hoddinott
  - Harp Concerto, Op. 11 (1957)
- Karl Jenkins
  - Over the Stone, a concerto for two harps (2008)
- André Jolivet
  - Concerto for harp and chamber orchestra (1952)
- Joseph Jongen
  - Concerto for Harp and Orchestra, Op.129 (1944)
- Jean-Baptiste Krumpholz
  - Harp Concertos Nos. 1 and 2, Op. 4 (c. 1777)
  - Harp Concertos Nos. 3 and 4, Op. 6 (c. 1777)
  - Harp Concerto No. 5, Op. 7 (c. 1778)
  - Harp Concerto No. 6, Op. 9 (c. 1785)
- William Lovelock
  - Rhapsody Concerto for Harp and Orchestra (1981)
- William Mathias
  - Harp Concerto, Op. 50 (1970)
- Marjan Mozetich
  - Concerto for Two Harps and Orchestra, The Passion of Angels (1995 )
- Darius Milhaud
  - Harp Concerto, Op. 323 (1953)
- Sergiu Natra
  - Divertimento for Harp (solo) and String Orch.
- Charles Oberthür
  - Harp Concertino, Op. 175 (c.1863)
- Giovanni Paisiello
  - Harp Concerto in A major
- Francesco Petrini
  - Two harp concertos arranged from works by "Mr. Bach" and "Mr. J.-B. Davaux", Op. 18 (c.1782)
  - Harp Concerto No. 1, Op. 25 (1786)
  - Harp Concerto No. 3, Op. 27 (1793)
  - Harp Concerto No. 4 in B♭, Op. 29 (1793)
- Gabriel Pierné
      - Konzertstück, Op.39 (1901)
- Einojuhani Rautavaara
  - Harp Concerto (2000)
- Henriette Renié
  - Harp Concerto (1901)
- Carl Reinecke (1824–1910)
  - Harp Concerto in E Minor, Opus 182 (1884)
- Joaquín Rodrigo
  - Concierto serenata (1952)
- Nino Rota
  - Harp Concerto (1947)
- R. Murray Schafer
  - Harp Concerto (1987)
- Ariel Sol Bertulfo Schwartz
  - Strum! Harp Concerto (2024)
- Leo Smit
  - Concertino pour harpe et orchestre (1933)
- Leo Sowerby
  - Concerto for Harp and Small Orchestra, H. 123 (1916/1919)
- John Thomas
  - Two harp concertos, including the Concerto in E♭, the only work by a Welsh composer to be performed (1852) during the first hundred years of the history of the Royal Philharmonic Society
- Germaine Tailleferre
  - Concertino for Harp and Orchestra (1927)
- Boris Tishchenko
  - Concerto for Harp and Chamber Orchestra, Op. 69 (1977)
- Geirr Tveitt
  - Harp Concerto No. 1 (Lost)
  - Harp Concerto No. 2 "Concerto Eroico" op.170 (1957)
- Heitor Villa-Lobos
  - Harp Concerto (1953)
- Georg Christoph Wagenseil
  - Concerto for Harp and strings in F, WWV 281 (1761)
- John Williams
  - On Willows and Birches (2009)
- Mario Zafred
  - Concerto for Harp and Orchestra (1956?)

=== Other concertante works ===
- Luciano Berio
  - Chemins I on Sequenza II (1964)
- Garrett Byrnes (b. 1971)
  - Capriccio Tempestoso (2010)
- André Caplet
  - Légende (1908) after Edgar Allan Poe's "The Masque of the Red Death," revised as Conte fantastique for harp and string quartet (1922-3)
- Don Gillis
  - Rhapsody for Harp and Orchestra (1946)
- Joe Hisaishi
  - Adagio for 2 Harps and Strings (2023)
- Valeri Kikta
  - Frescos of the St. Sofia Cathedral of Kiev for harp and orchestra (1974)
  - Scottish Suite on Scottish Themes from 16th – 18th centuries for two harps and orchestra (2000)
- Jean-Baptiste Krumpholz
  - Symphonies Nos. 1 and 2 for harp and orchestra, Op. 11 (1787)
- Théodore Labarre
  - Fantaisie, Op. 101 (1841)
- Charles Oberthür
  - Macbeth Overture, Op. 60 (1852)
  - Loreley, legend, Op. 180
- Gabriel Pierné
  - Concertstück, Op. 39 (1903)
- Walter Piston
  - Capriccio for Harp and String Orchestra (1963)
- Einojuhani Rautavaara
  - Ballade for harp and strings (1973/1981)
- Ferdinand Ries
  - Overture Bardique [concertante] for 6 harps (in 2 parts) and orchestra WoO 24 (1815)
- Joaquín Rodrigo
  - Sones en la Giralda (1963)
- Camille Saint-Saëns
  - Morceau de concert in G, Op. 154 (1918)
- Arnold Schoenberg
  - Notturno for Strings and Harp (1895–96)
- Toru Takemitsu
  - Toward the Sea II, for alto flute, harp and string orchestra II (1981)

=== Concertos with other solo instruments ===
- William Alwyn
  - Concerto for Oboe, harp and strings (1944)
- Kalevi Aho
  - Concerto for Cor anglais, Harp and Orchestra (2014)
- Henry Cowell
  - Duo concertante for flute, harp, and orchestra, L. 894 (1961)
- Hans Werner Henze
  - Doppio Concerto for oboe, harp & strings (1966)
- Paul Hindemith
  - Konzertmusik for brass, harp, and piano, Op. 49 (1930)
  - Concerto for woodwinds, harp, and orchestra (1949)
- Anna Jalkéus
  - Concerto for jazz voice, harp and orchestra "The Rise of Estrogenia" (2017)
- Lowell Liebermann
  - Concerto for Flute, Harp and Orchestra, Op.48 (1995)
- Frank Martin
  - Petite symphonie concertante for harp, harpsichord, piano and double string orchestra, op.54 (1944)
- Fabio Mengozzi
  - Auriga II (piano, harp and string orchestra)
- Wolfgang Amadeus Mozart
  - Concerto for flute and harp in C, K. 299 (1778)
- Louis Spohr
  - Concertante for violin and harp in G, WoO 13 (1806)
  - Concertante for violin and harp in E minor, WoO 14 (1807)
