= Krumpholz =

Krumpholz or Krumpholtz is a German surname that may refer to

- Anne-Marie Krumpholtz (1755/1766-1813/1824), French harpist and composer
- Annerose Fiedler (née Krumpholz in 1951), East German hurdler
- Fanny Krumpholtz Pittar (1785–1815), Bohemian harpist and composer
- Jean-Baptiste Krumpholz (1742–1790), Czech composer, father of Fanny and brother of Wenzel
- J. W. Krumpholz (born 1987), American water polo player
- Kurt Krumpholz, American swimmer
- Wenzel Krumpholz (1750–1817), Czech-born musician, brother of Jean-Baptiste
