= Bohemian harp =

Bohemian strung musical instrument

Bohemian Harp
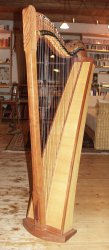
- A modern Bohemian Harp by Klangwerkstatt in Markt Wald

String instrument
- Other names: Hakenharfe, Wanderharfe, Manualharfe
- Classification: Chordophone
- Hornbostel–Sachs classification: 322.211

Related instruments
- Celtic harp

Composers
- Mozart

The Bohemian Harp (Czech: harfa), also referred to as the Hakenharfe, is a Central European lever harp, similar to the Celtic harp, with a straight, tenoned neck. It was played foremostly by travelling musicians going through Europe in the 19th century, occasionally in bands. When played in bands, it was often used as an accompaniment for bass violin and bock. The instrument was also popular as a folk instrument. The harp was far lighter than other European harps used in royal courts, for ease of portability.

== History ==
Images of Bohemian harps have been found dating to the 18th century, in Přísečnice, as well as Nechanice. The Bohemian harp was especially popular in Prague, and especially in Přísečnice, where a factory for the harps was created, as well as a harp school. The harp was spread to Western Europe after a fire hit the town in 1811, causing mass emigration away from it. The harp became so popular in Germany, that Johann Georg Heinrich Backofen once referred to it as "our German harp".

The tradition of harp playing in Bohemia ended around the First World War, when Bohemia again experienced mass emigration. However, specimens can be found in many Czech museums. Since around 2002, some individuals have constructed versions of the harp, based on these specimens, and the Klangwerkstatt in Markt Wald.

=== Tyrolean Harp ===
A variant of the Bohemian harp, the Tyrolean Harp, can still be found in areas of Tyrol. It was brought across by Bohemian workers working in the local mines, sometime in the first half of the 19th century. Tyrolean harps are typically tuned in E♭ major, but could be played in E major due to the strings' hooks. It, like the Bohemian harp, uses a curved soundboard. It differs from the Bohemian Harp in that it is a cross between a keyed harp and a pedal harp, using a single pedal (unlike most modern pedal harps). This pedal mechanism was created in 1720, by Bavarian harp maker Jacob Hochbrucker, from Mindelheim. It also has a larger range than the Bohemian Harp, using six octaves. The Tyrolean harp is very popular in tradition Tyrolean folk music, both as an accompaniment and a solo instrument.

== Construction ==
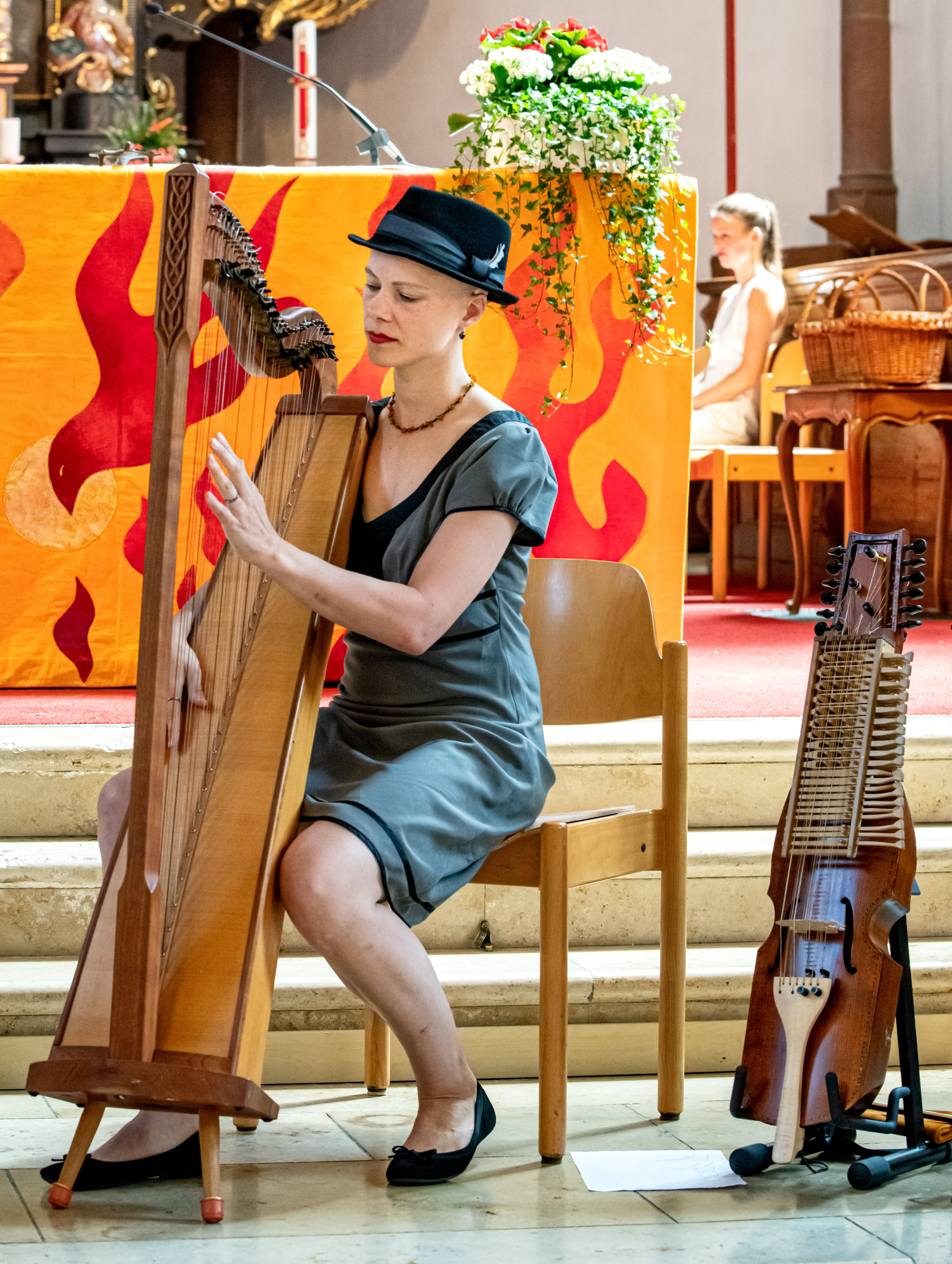
Anna-Maria Hefele plays a self-built Bohemian Harp at the Black Forest Voices Festival at the St. Gallus, Kirchzarten church on 30 June 2019. The instrument to the right is a Nyckelharpa.

The harp's pillar is mostly built of spruce. In original instruments, the soundboard uses a vertical wood grain, with some models using a herringbone pattern or diagonal grain (which was exceedingly rare). The instrument had sound holes in the top of the harp, as opposed to conventional harps, which have them in the back wall. Bohemian harps have between 30 and 18 strings, with seven strings per octave, with a range of five octaves. The instrument is between 120 and 170 cm tall, and is played seated, standing on the floor. Strings were made of catgut, but modern replicas use either nylon or polyvinylidene fluoride. The harp notably had a very small distance between the strings, and the strings were held under low tension, to reduce the weight of the instrument.

Bohemian harps come in two main varieties, those with levers, on the left hand side of the harp, to adjust the pitch of the strings, and those without. These hooks were used to raise the pitch of a string by a semitone, and were the forerunner of the semitone pedal on modernday pedal harps. Harps with semitone levers were often referred to as Hooked harps (German: Hakenharfen).

== Literature ==
- Jiří Kleňha: Das Harfenspiel in Böhmen: die Geschichte der Wandermusikanten aus Nechanitz. Übersetzt aus dem Tschechischen von Gisela Rusá. 1. Auflage. Granit Verlag, Prague 2002.
- Nancy Thym-Hochrein: Wanderharfner und Harfenjule. Die Hakenharfe im deutschsprachigen Raum. In: Folk-Michel, 1992, 3, pp. 18–22.
- Elvira Werner: Fahrende Musikanten – eine böhmisch-sächsische Erfahrung. In: Heike Müns (Hrsg.): Musik und Migration in Ostmitteleuropa. R. Oldenbourg Verlag, München 2005, pp. 153–166.
