= Jean-Henri Naderman =

Harp maker and publisher (1734–1799)

- Born: 1734; Germany
- Origin: France
- Died: 1799 (aged 64–65)
- Occupations: Harp maker, publisher

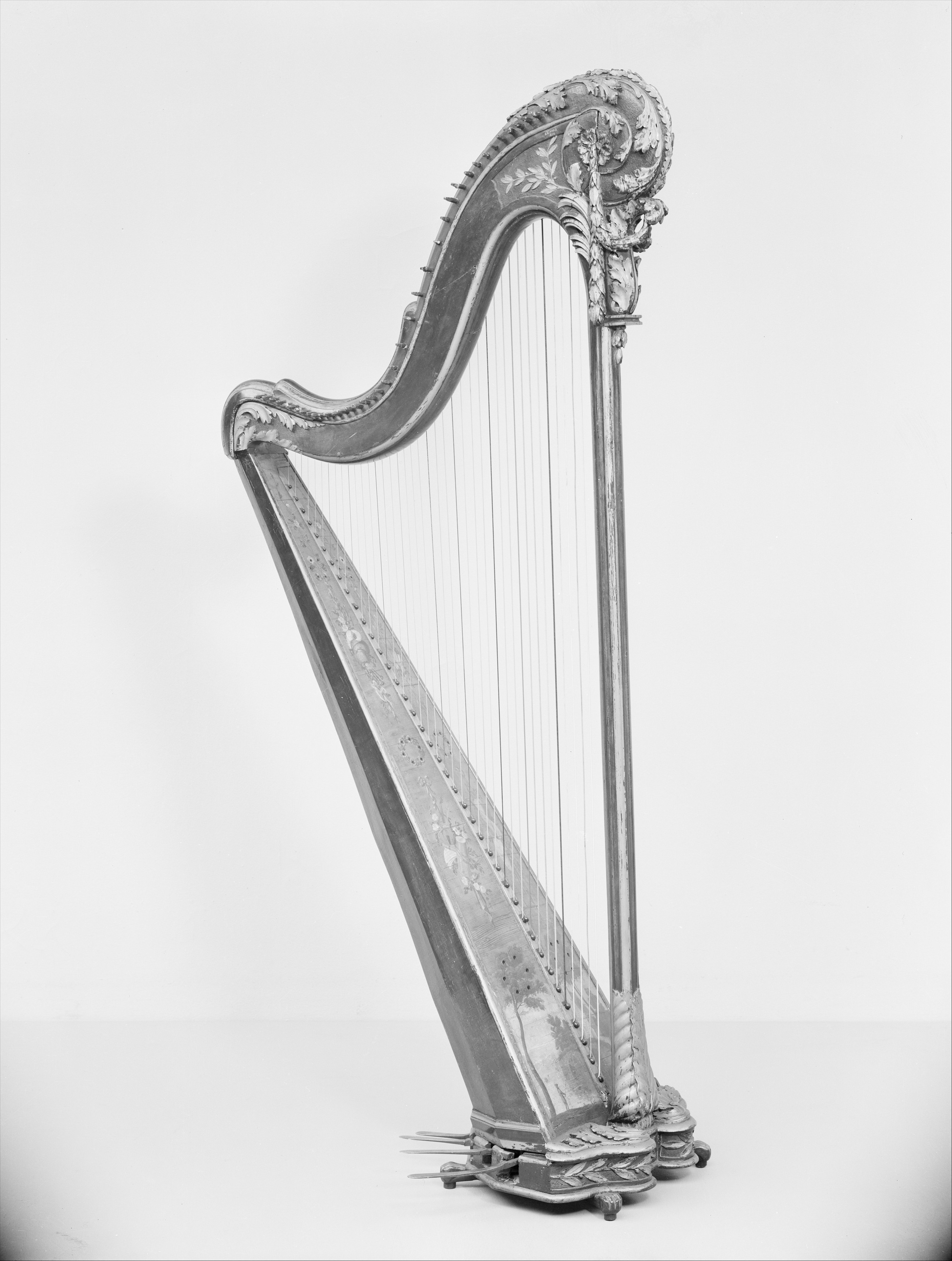
Pedal harp by Jean-Henri Naderman, The MET

Jean-Henri Naderman (baptised 20 July 1734 – 4 February 1799) was one of the leading harp-makers in Paris in the 18th century, and also a music publisher. He supplied the Royal Household with his instruments and wrote his music in classical style, with a large influence of the baroque. He had two sons, François Joseph Naderman, renowned harpist, and Henri Naderman, harp maker.

== Life ==
Jean-Henri Naderman was baptised (and presumably born) in Lichtenau in the archdiocese of Paderborn, but emigrated to France around 1756 where he began working as a harp manufacturer. Later in 1777 he was licensed to work as a music publisher. He rose to fame when he was commissioned to create and perfect the harps of Queen Marie-Antoinette on her arrival in France, together with the Czech composer and harpist Jean-Baptiste Krumpholtz.

The Naderman single-pedal harp is supposed to have been modelled after the successful eighteenth-century Bavarian single-action mechanism pedal harp, whose manufacture, although claimed by several other harp makers including Jean Paul Vetter of Nuremberg and Johann Hausen of Weimar, is often attributed to Jacob Hochbrucker. Today, six harps of this specific model have been located. Jean-Henri Naderman died in Paris.

== Works ==
- Petite chasse
- Sonate op. 17 no.2 in F major (harp solo)
- 12 Études et un thème varié (harp solo)
