= Charles Oberthür =

Charles Oberthür may refer to:

- Charles Oberthür (entomologist)
- Charles Oberthür (composer)
