= Harp Concerto (Glière) =

Concerto by Reinhold Glière

Reinhold Glière wrote his Concerto for Harp and Orchestra in E♭ major, Op. 74, in 1938.

It lasts about 25 minutes and is in three movements:

1. Allegro moderato in E♭ major
2. Tema con variazioni in C♭ major
3. Allegro giocoso in E♭ major

Glière sought the technical advice of the harpist Ksenia Alexandrovna Erdely (1878–1971). She made so many suggestions that he offered to credit her as co-composer, but she declined. The work was published as the work of Glière as edited by Erdely.

The music combines features that are redolent of both the Viennese classical style and Russian romantic nationalism.

== Recordings ==
The Harp Concerto has been recorded a number of times:

- Osian Ellis, London Symphony Orchestra, Richard Bonynge (1968)
- Olga Erdeli, Moscow Radio Large Symphony Orchestra, Boris Khaikin and Gennady Rozhdestvensky (1968)
- Catherine Michel, Luxembourg Radio/Television Symphony Orchestra, Louis de Froment (1992)
- Rachel Masters, City of London Sinfonia, Richard Hickox (1993)
- Alice Giles, Adelaide Symphony Orchestra, David Porcelijn (1999)
- Gretchen Van Hoesen, New Symphony Orchestra (Sofia), Rossen Milanov (2002)
- Emmanuel Ceysson, Bavarian Radio Symphony Orchestra, Lawrence Renes (2009)
- Claire Jones, English Chamber Orchestra, Paul Watkins (2010)
- Xavier de Maistre, WDR Symphony Orchestra Cologne, Nathalie Stutzmann (2022)

== See also ==
- List of compositions for harp
