= Fanny Krumpholtz Pittar =

Bohemian harpist and composer

Louisa Françoise "Fanny" Therese Pittar (nee Krumpholtz) (born 1781 Paris – died 1862 Brighton) was a Bohemian harpist and composer. She was the daughter of composer Johann Baptist Krumpholtz (1742–1790) and his wife Anne-Marie Krumpholtz.

The Duchesse de Bourbon, who was the wife of Louis Philippe II, Duke of Orléans and the mother of Louis Philippe I., King of France from 1830 to 1848, undertook to bring up Fanny, on the death of her father Jean Baptiste Krumpholtz, composer and harpist at the French court. This adoption made Fanny the adopted sister of Louis Philippe. Fanny lived at the French court during this time. During the French Revolution Fanny was sent by the Duchesse de Bourbon to England to live with the Earl of Hardwicke and his wife at the large and stately Wimpole Hall.

For many years after leaving France, Fanny maintained her connection with the Duchesse de Bourbon through a long correspondence of letters,(For an account of her life see Hickstead MS. 1059b.).

Fanny Krumpholtz married the diamond merchant and art dealer Isaac Pittar in 1813 at Saint James, Westminster, London, England. Her children included, Frances Mary Jane Pittar, Isaac John Pittar, Louisa Margaret Pittar and Caroline.

She published as Mrs. Pittar. A manuscript book of her work was published in 1811 and is available in the British Library.

For many years Fanny lived with her family in Brighton, East Sussex.

== Works ==
Selected works include:

- Harp compositions
- Dedans mon petit Reduit?
- A Military Divertimento
