= Félix Godefroid =

Belgian harpist

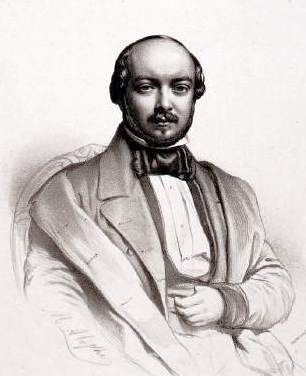
Félix Godefroid by Marie-Alexandre Alophe

Dieudonné-Félix Godefroid (24 July 1818 - 12 July 1897) was a Belgian harpist, who composed for his instrument and for the piano.

Félix Godefroid was born at Namur, where his father failed in a theatre venture and moved the family to Boulogne-sur-Mer, where he opened a music school. In 1832 Félix entered the Conservatoire de Paris to study harp with François Joseph Naderman and Théodore Labarre. Impressed with the pedal harp perfected by Sébastien Érard, Godefroid elected to pursue a concert career. From 1839, he began a brilliant solo tour through Europe and the Levant. In 1847, Félix Godefroid settled in Paris and finally made his debut there. Called the "Paganini of the harp" he became a great virtuoso, giving concerts throughout Europe.

Besides his pieces for harp and for piano, on which he was also a virtuoso performer, Godefroid composed masses and two operas, La Harpe d'or and La Fille de Saül. His didactic work Mes exercices pour la harpe was employed by several generations of harpists.

The Belgian painter Félicien Rops painted his portrait in August 1856.

His older brother Jules-Joseph Godefroid (1811-1840) was also a harpist and composer.

Godefroid died in Villers-sur-Mer. The Concours Godefroid, established to mark the centennial of his death, is held every three years at his native city of Namur and nearby Belgian cities.

== Publications ==
- Mes exercices pour la harpe (1891)
- Étude de concert en mi bémol mineur pour harpe (reprint 1978)
