= Théodore Labarre =

French harpist and composer

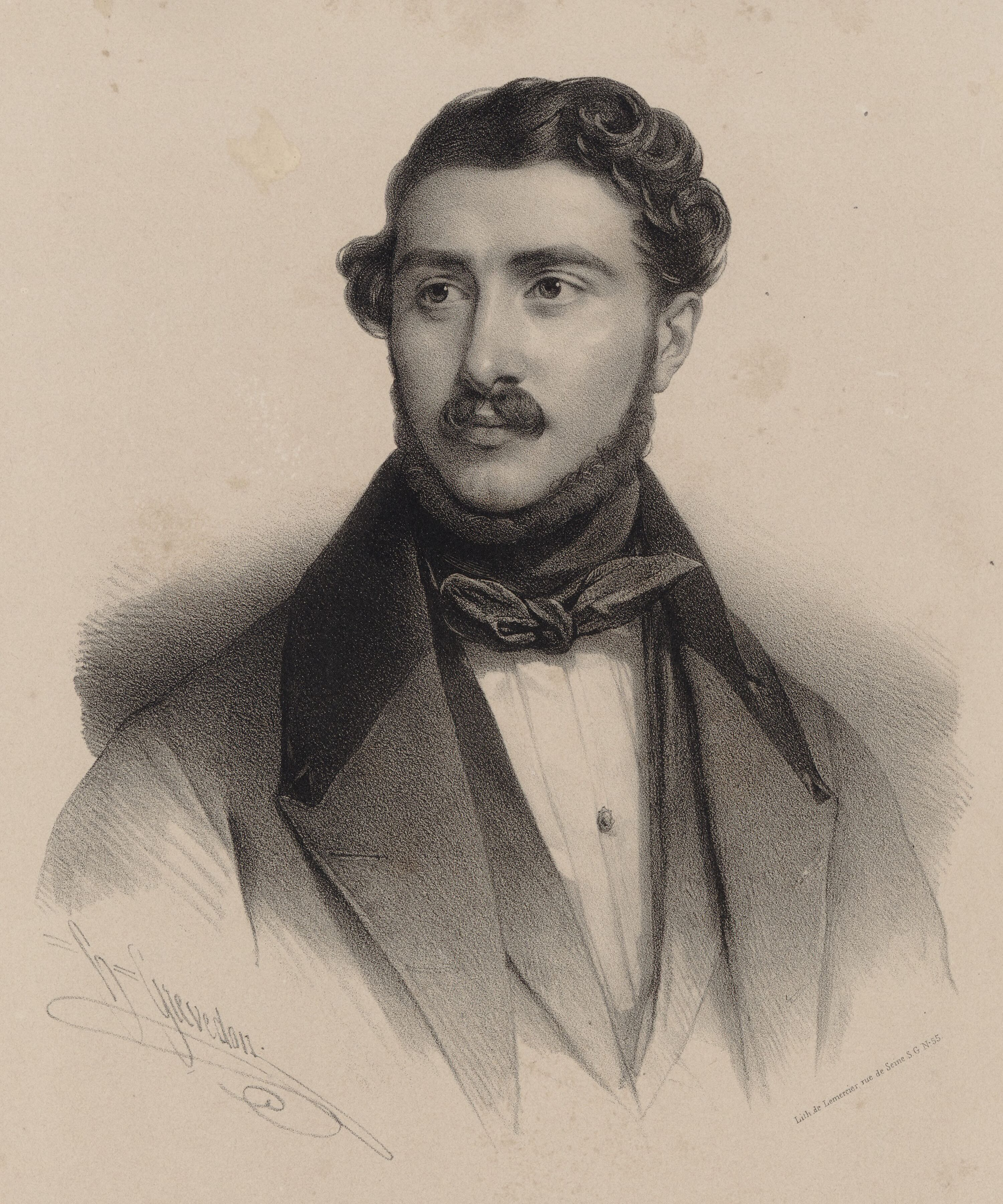
Théodore Labarre (1840)

Théodore François Joseph Berry Labarre (23 March 1805 – 9 March 1870) was a French harpist and composer. He lived in Paris and in London and was awarded the Prix de Rome in 1823 as well as the Légion d'honneur in 1862.

== Life ==
Labarre was born in Paris to parents Pierre Charles Berry Labarre and Sophie Genevelly. He studied the harp with Jacques-Georges Cousineau and at the Paris Conservatoire with François Joseph Naderman and Nicolas-Charles Bochsa, also harmony with Victor Dourlen and composition with François-Adrien Boieldieu. In 1823, after having won the Prix de Rome, he travelled to England to give several solo concerts, also including Ireland. This was followed by travels to Switzerland and Italy, before he returned to France in 1831. He tried his hand, with varying degrees of success, in opera and ballet, but his popularity largely stemmed from his romances and melodies rather than from his large-scale works. The main focus of his work were compositions for the harp.

In 1837, he married the singer Algaé Caroline Antoinette Lambert, with whom he regularly performed in England. He was conductor of the Opéra Comique between 1847 and 1849, afterwards "inspecteur accompagnateur" of the Imperial Chapel of Napoléon III, and finally (from 1867), professor of harp at the Conservatoire. His pupils included Joseph-Léon Gatayes and Félix Godefroid. He died in Paris.

== Selected works ==
Opera

- Les Deux familles, comic opera in 3 acts (1831)
- L'Aspirant de marine, comic opera in 1 act (1834)
- Le Ménétrier, ou Les deux duchesses, comic opera in 3 acts (1845)
- Pantagruel, opéra bouffe in 2 acts (1855)

Ballet

- La Révolte des femmes au sérail, 3 acts (1833)
- Jovita, ou Les Boucaniers, 3 tableaux (1853)
- La Fonti, 6 tableaux (1855)
- Graziosa, 1 act (1861)

Vocal (songs)

- Rives de la Plata (words: A. Betourné). Romance. Paris: Le Ménestrel (Journal) n° 23, Mai 1834. Also version with guitar accompaniment by Matteo Carcassi (in same issue)
- Album. 8 Mélodies (1843)
- Album. 12 Mélodies (1844)
- Album. 12 Romances (1852)
- many more songs and religious music

Harp

- Souvenirs irlandais op. 32 (1829)
- Thème et Variations op. 34 (c.1829)
- Trois Airs irlandais favoris: Sly Patrick, The Minstrel Boy, Nora Creena op. 39 (1830)
- Fantaisie sur des motifs de Fra Diavolo de D.F.E. Auber op. 46 (1830)
- Ricordanza di Paganini op. 51 (1831)
- Fantaisie sur des motifs de l'opéra de Gustave ou Le Bal masqué de D.F.E. Auber op. 66 (c.1835)
- Fantaisie écossaise op. 90 (1838)
- Nocturne espagnol op. 91 (1838)
- Les Danses nationales de l'Europe op. 93 (c.1838)
- Les Charmes de Londres. Grande fantaisie sur des airs anglais favoris op. 100 (1840)
- Souvenir de Donizetti. Fantaisie op. 101 (1840)
- Fantaisie sur l'opéra Il Giuramento de Mercadante op. 103 (1841)
- Grande fantaisie sur des motifs de Anna Bolena et de La Norma op. 109 (1842)
- Fantaisie sur des motifs de l'Opéra La Favorite de G. Donizetti op. 112 (1842)

Piano

- Six Petits caprices caractéristiques op. 115 (1842)
- Sylvia, romance sans paroles (c.1845)

Duos for harp and piano

- Duo sur l'opéra de Tancrède op. 9 (c.1820)
- Mosaïque sur l'Ambassadrice op. 83 (1837)
- Grand duo du couronnement op. 104 (1841)
- Duo sur des motifs de La Favorite de G. Donizetti op. 111 (1842)
- Duo brillant sur les plus beaux motifs de Linda de Chamouny de Donizetti op. 115 (c.1843)
