= Christoph Scheiner =

Jesuit priest, physicist and astronomer (1573–1650)

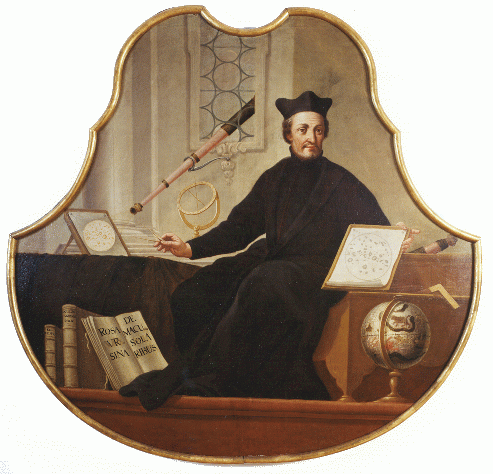
1725 portrait of Christoph Scheiner.

Christoph Scheiner (25 July 1573 (or 1575) – 18 June 1650) was a Jesuit priest, physicist and astronomer in Ingolstadt.

== Biography ==
=== Augsburg/Dillingen: 1591–1605 ===
Scheiner was born in Markt Wald near Mindelheim in Swabia, earlier margravate Burgau, possession of the House of Habsburg. He attended the Jesuit St. Salvator Grammar School in Augsburg from May 1591 until 24 October 1595. He graduated as a "rhetor" and entered the Jesuit Order in Landsberg am Lech on 26 October 1595. At the local seminary, he served his biennial novitiate (1595–1597) under the tutelage of Novice Master Father Rupert Reindl SJ. From 1597 to 1598, he finished his lower studies of rhetoric in Augsburg. He took his first vows before Father Melchior Stör, SJ and received the minor orders from the Augsburg suffragan bishop Sebastian Breuning. He spent the years 1598–1601 in Ingolstadt studying philosophy (metaphysics and mathematics). In 1603, Scheiner invented the pantograph, an instrument which could duplicate plans and drawings to an adjustable scale. From 1603 to 1605 he taught humanities: his years as a Latin teacher at the Jesuit grammar school in Dillingen earned him the title of Magister Artium.

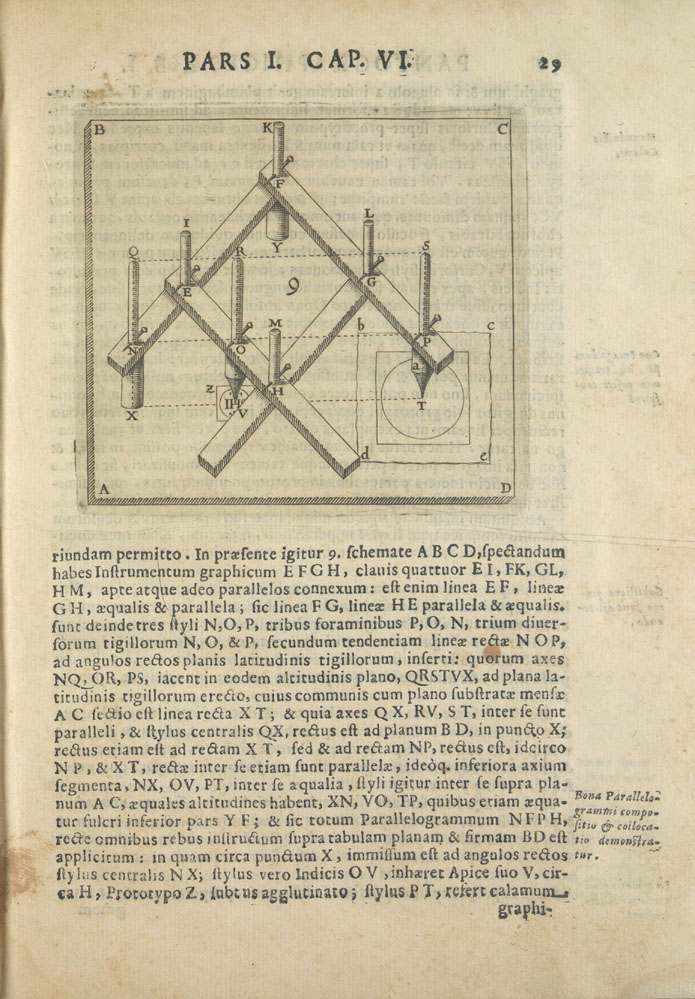
Pantograph

=== Ingolstadt: 1605–1617 ===
From the autumn of 1605 until 1609, Scheiner studied theology in Ingolstadt. Due to his invention of the pantograph, he had already gained celebrity status. Duke William V of Bavaria even invited him to Munich to demonstrate the instrument.

On 14 March 1609, he entered Holy Orders as a Deacon. He was ordained by suffragan bishop Marcus Lyresius. Scheiner finished his studies on 30 June 1609 with his first work, Theses Theologicae and with a disputation (PhD in theology). On 18 April 1609, he received his major orders from suffragan bishop Lyresius in Eichstätt, from where he went to Ebersberg to serve his tertianship with Father Johannes Pelecius S.J. In the years between 1610 and 1616/1617, Scheiner worked as a successor to Father Johannes Lantz S.J. in Ingolstadt, teaching mathematics (physics and astronomy) and Hebrew. He lectured on sun dials, practical geometry, astronomy, optics, and the telescope.

In 1611, Scheiner and his student, Johann Baptist Cysat, observed sunspots; in 1612 he published the "Apelles letters" in Augsburg. Mark Welser had the first three Apelles letters printed in Augsburg on 5 January 1612. They provided one of many reasons for the subsequent unpleasant argument between Scheiner and Galileo Galilei, which began when Galileo responded to the Apelles letters with his own Letters on Sunspots. Scheiner published in 1614 the Disquisitiones mathematicae in Ingolstadt with Johann Georg Locher, in 1615 Sol ellipticus in Augsburg and with Georg Schönberger Exegeses fundamentorum gnomonicorum in Ingolstadt, and in 1617 he published Refractiones coelestes, also in Ingolstadt. Scheiner took his remaining vows of poverty, chastity, obedience and loyalty before the Pope on 31 July 1617 in the town of Ingolstadt under Father Johannes Manhart S.J. In the very same year Scheiner made known his wish to go to China as a missionary. Father General Mutio Vitelleschi sent him a letter, however, telling Scheiner he had better stay in Europe and persevere with his mathematical studies. In the winter of 1617/1618, Scheiner returned to Innsbruck, Austria at the behest of Archduke Maximilian III.

=== Innsbruck/Freiburg/Neisse: 1617–1624 ===
After November 1614, Archduke Maximilian III summoned Scheiner to Innsbruck several times to discuss astronomical and mathematical questions. The Archduke had received an astronomical telescope with two convex lenses which showed objects upside down and the wrong way round. Scheiner added a third lens, thus manufacturing a terrestrial telescope which allowed Maximilian to see the beautiful stretches of his country while standing upright. A portable camera obscura was developed by Scheiner in Innsbruck. Furthermore, a walkable camera obscura was constructed.

After the death of Maximilian III in 1618, Archduke Leopold V was appointed imperial representative of Tyrol and of the Upper Provinces. Like his predecessor Maximilian, Leopold V put his trust in Father Scheiner. Scheiner's "Oculus hoc est: Fundamentum opticum," containing many new insights into the physiological nature of the eye, was published in Innsbruck in 1619. The book had been written earlier in Ingolstadt. Oculus is subdivided into three parts: the first part treats the anatomy of the eye, the second part the refraction of the light ray inside the eye, and the third part deals with the retina and the visual angle. Scheiner once again chooses the way of observation and experiment. Like Kepler before him, he found that the retina is the seat of vision and that the optic nerve transmits the images from the retina to the brain. Scheiner was rebuked once more for going from Innsbruck to Hall in a heavily loaded coach drawn by six horses. Father General Vitelleschi wrote him a letter. Archduke Leopold V and Father Scheiner carried on a sizeable correspondence from 1620 until 1632. One of Scheiner's letters to Leopold from 1626 informs the Archduke that Galilei is not to hear of Scheiner's work concerning the sunspots.

The inventory of Leopold's library contains works by Tycho Brahe and Galileo Galilei: Leopold lead a friendly correspondence with Galilei. On 23 May 1618, Leopold received telescopes from Galilei, along with a treatise on the sunspots, the Discorso del Flusso e Reflusso del Mare.

Scheiner was the builder of the new Jesuit church in Innsbruck. Craftsmen began to work on the roof in July 1624, but September saw a sudden collapse of the middle part of the gallery and the sidewall facing the street. According to a new decision, the church had to be turned by 90° and be reconstructed.

Freiburg University was facing a decline at the beginning of the 17th century. It was on 16 November 1620, that Archduke Leopold summoned the Jesuit Fathers, first of all, the "most excellent by far" Christoph Scheiner. In the spring of 1621, Scheiner was recalled for reasons confirmed to be unknown: in fact it was Archduke Karl's wish to have Scheiner as his father confessor. Archduke Karl had travelled with Scheiner from Brixen to Vienna, from where he did not return to Neisse until sometime between 1621 and 1622. In February 1623, Scheiner was appointed Superior of the future college. Then the Spanish King Philipp IV chose Karl of Austria for the office of a vice-king of Portugal. Archduke Karl travelled to Madrid. Scheiner had to travel to Rome, to instigate the foundation of the new college in Neisse. Scheiner stayed in Rome longer than his duty required. In Rosa Ursina sive Sol, he wrote that he had been sent to Rome "ad summum pontificem, ob certa peragenda negotia" (Latin meaning "to the pontifical summons..."). Other theories, contending that Scheiner had been summoned to Rome as an expert astronomer because of Galilei, or that he felt his transfer to Neisse was a punishment, have not been confirmed. It was only 13 years later, that he returned to Neisse via Vienna, where he stayed for some time.

=== Rome: 1624–1633 ===
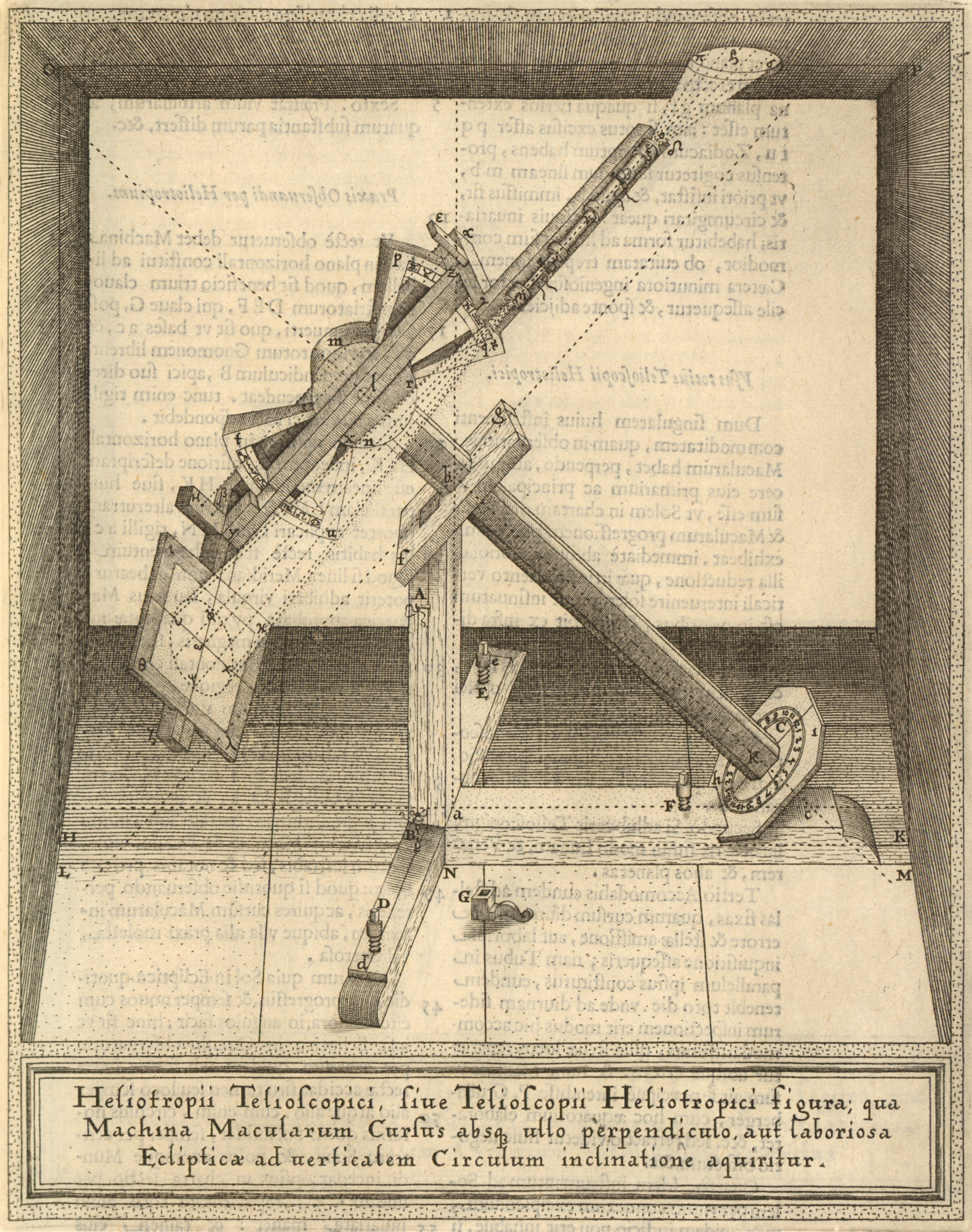
A sunspot-instrument by Scheiner (printed between 1626–1630)

When Scheiner went to Rome in 1624, friends asked him to write about his solar observations. At last he had time for mathematical books, among them Galilei’s Il saggiatore, which contains Galileo's work on sunspots. This was similar to Scheiner's own work (unsurprisingly, since both were observing at the same time) but led to allegations from both of plagiarism by the other, and to a deep enmity between the two scientists. In 1629 and 1630, Scheiner observed a series of mock suns (parhelia) and haloes, including a complex display on 24 January 1630. These were described in his book Parhelia, which had a profound influence on the work of René Descartes and later on Christiaan Huygens. His observations also included an eclipse on 8 April 1633. On 22 June 1633, Galilei received his sentence and had to renounce his claims, despite the protest sounding even from the Aristotelian side. Scheiner's influence on the trial cannot be proven. The trial files merely contain a small note mentioning that he had opposed the Copernicans. At the time of the trial, Scheiner was still in Rome, staying at the seminary for future priests.

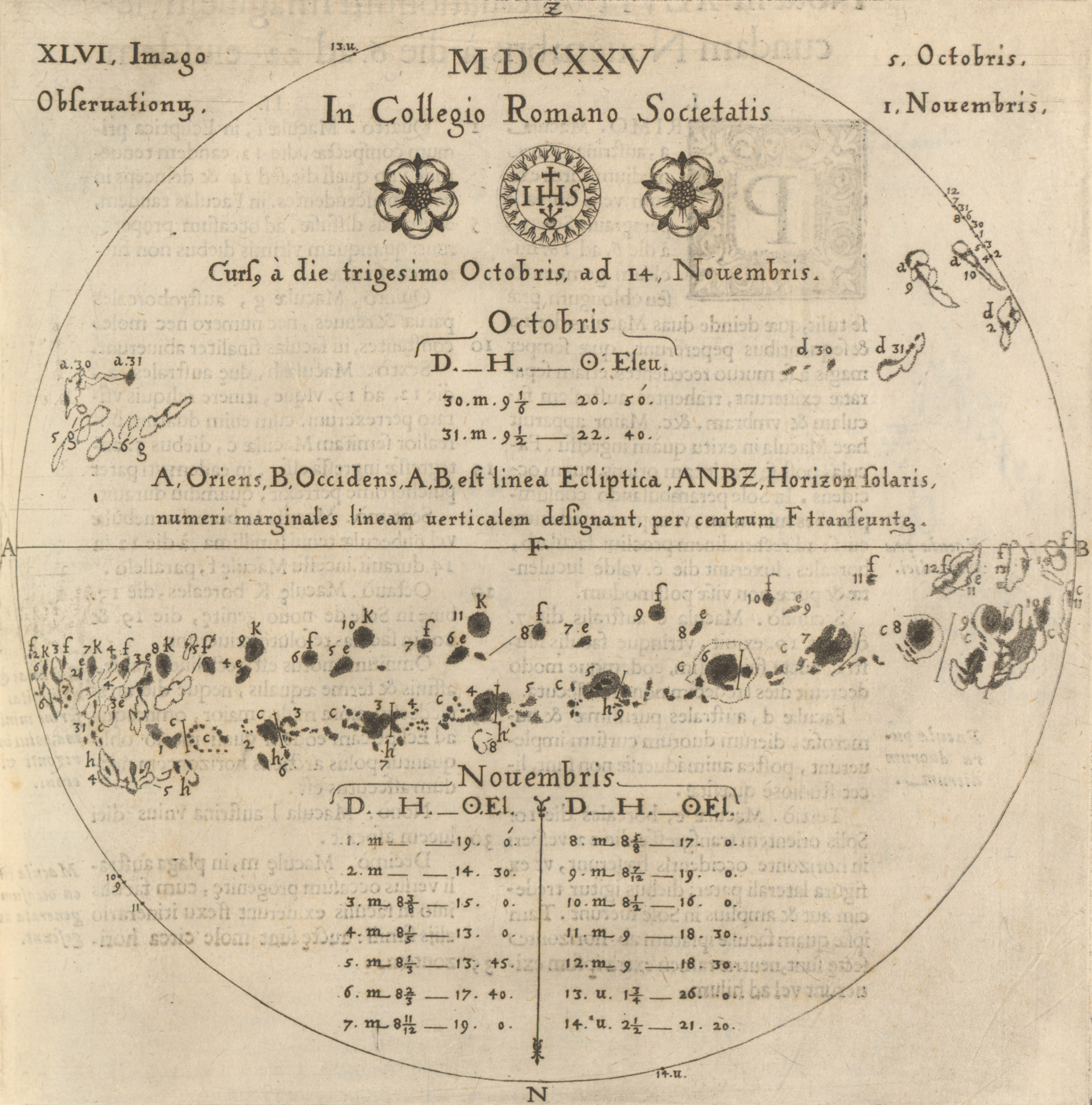
Depiction of the sunspots

Scheiner wrote three of his books in Rome: Rosa Ursina sive Sol (Bracciano, 1626–1630), on sunspots, which served as a standard work for research work on the sunspots for a long time. Rosa Ursina sive Sol contains four books. In the first part, Scheiner discusses the question of priority of discovery in regard to sunspots. The second part not only describes telescopes, different kinds of projection and the helioscope but also compares the optics of the telescope to the physiological optics of the eye. In the third book, Scheiner presents a comprehensive collection of the data from his observation of sunspots. Book 4 consists of two parts: the first part deals once again with solar phenomena like sunspots and sun flares, the sun's rotation period of 27 days and the inclination of its axis of rotation. In the second part, Scheiner mentions numerous passages and quotations from the Bible, the writings of the Church Fathers and philosophers to prove that his geocentric view is in accordance with the teachings of the Catholic Church. Scheiner published Pantographice, about the pantograph which he had invented as early as 1603, and finally in 1632/1633, Scheiner published his last work Prodromus, a pamphlet against the heliocentric theory which was published posthumously in 1651.

=== Vienna: 1633–1637 ===
Father General Mutio Vitelleschi wrote his first letter to Scheiner in Vienna on 21 January 1634. Thus Scheiner must have returned to Vienna between December 1633 and January 1634. Scheiner was unwilling to go back to Neisse. In Vienna, Scheiner was forced to confront the insecure funding for his book Rosa Ursina sive Sol.

=== Neisse: 1637–1650 ===
After 15 November 1637, Scheiner was in Neisse in Silesia. Scheiner's activities in Neisse: Advisor, Councilor of the Rector, Mentor and Father Confessor to the students. He died there, and his obituary from 1650 maintains that Scheiner had to stay in Vienna because of the war, that he had had to flee from Neisse with all his astronomical instruments, that he usually got up early, to write or read, take care of the garden and plant trees with his own hands. The author of this obituary mentions Scheiner's modesty and chastity while pointing out that he was envied by many and "struggled with envy himself." Christoph Scheiner died on 18 June 1650 in Neisse (now Nysa, Poland).

== Works ==
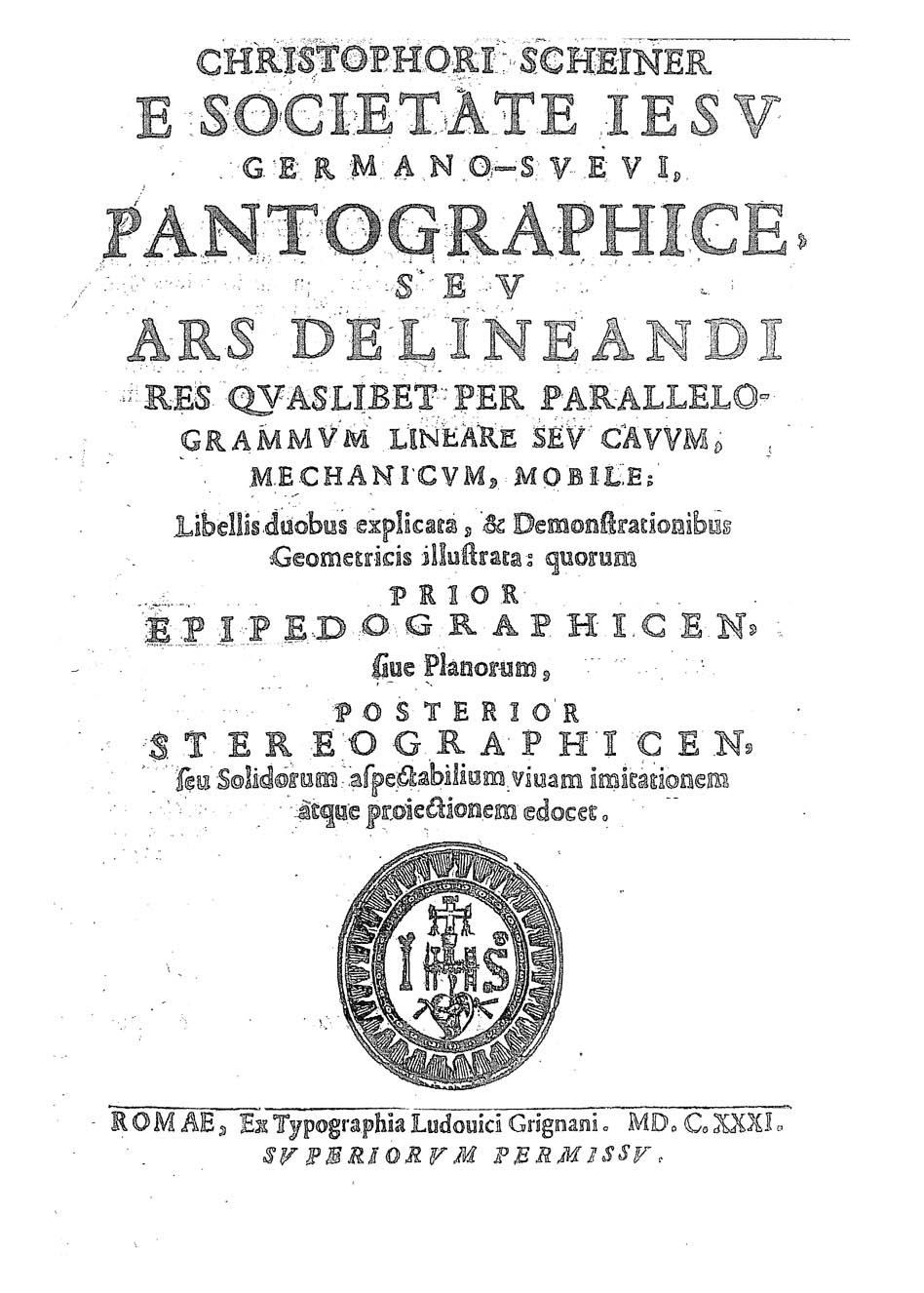
Pantographice, 1631

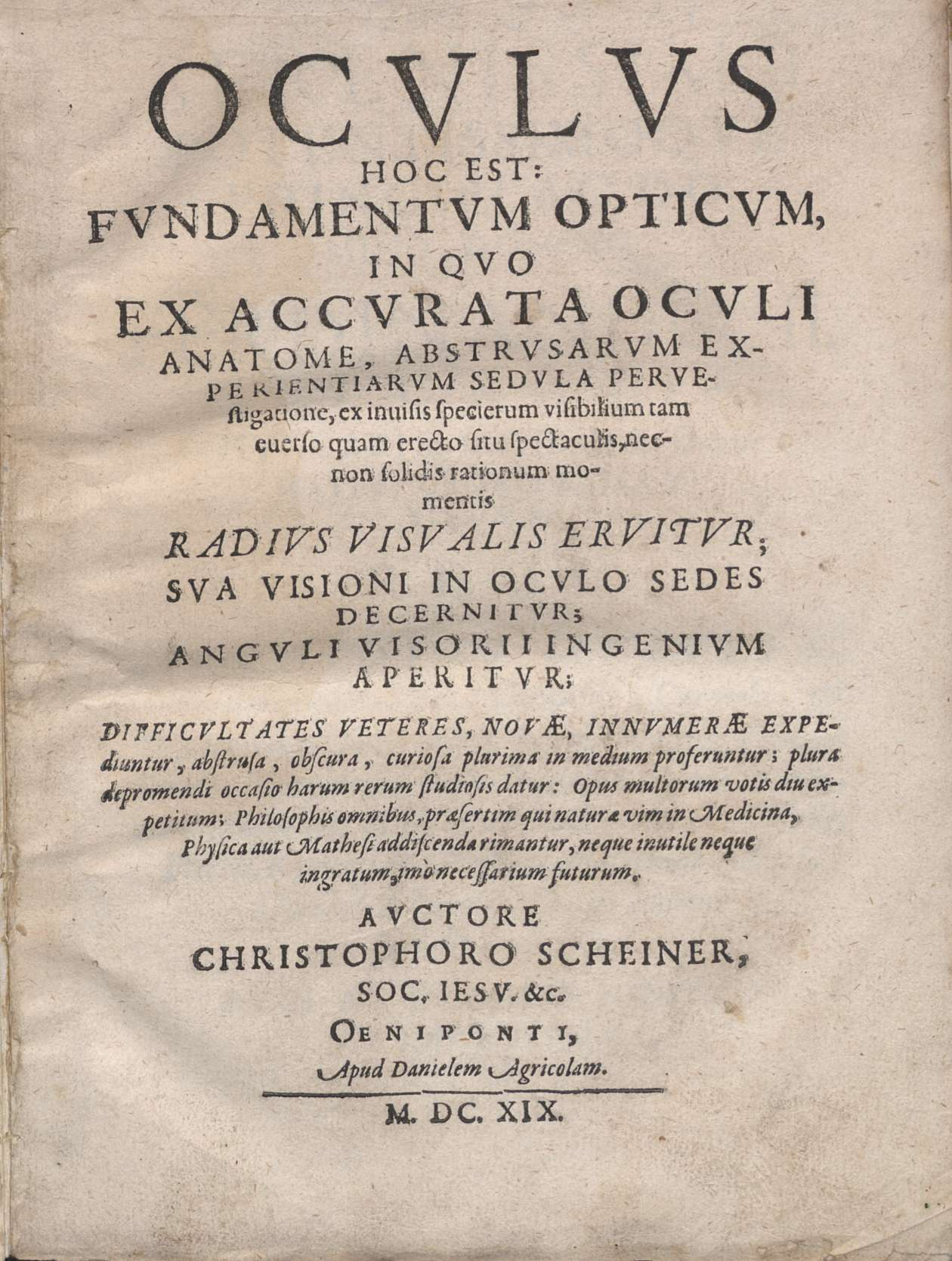
Oculus, 1619

- Tres epistolae de maculis solaribus (Augsburg, 1612) IMSS Digital Library
- De Maculis solaribus et stellis circa Iovis errantibus accuratior Disquisitio (Augsburg, 1612) IMSS Digital Library
- De maculis Solaribus (in Latin). Roma: Giacomo Mascardi (1.). 1613.
- Disquisitiones mathematicae (Ingolstadt, 1614, zusammen mit Stefan Locher) IMSS Digital Library
- Sol ellipticus (Augsburg, 1615) IMSS Digital Library
- Exegeses fundamentorum gnomonicorum (Ingolstadt, 1617)
- Refractiones coelestes sive solis elliptici phaenomenon illustratum (Ingolstadt, 1617) IMSS Digital Library
- Oculus, hoc est: Fundamentum opticum (Innsbruck, 1620) Gallica
- Rosa Ursina sive Sol. (Bracciano, 1626–30) IMSS Digital Library
- Pantographice seu ars delineandi (Rom, 1631) IMSS Digital Library
- Prodromus pro sole mobili et terra stabili contra ... Galilaeum a Galileis (Prag, 1651) IMSS Digital Library

== Legacy ==
The primary school in Markt Wald is named in memory of Christoph Scheiner. In Markt Wald, there is also a street and a plaque hangs in the town hall and an observation tower to his remembrance. In Ingolstadt, there is the Christoph-Scheiner-Gymnasium (a High School). The street to the observatory of LMU Munich and a road in Berlin (Charlottenburg) are named after Scheiner. In 1999, a coin (35-mm diameter), with Scheiner's face on it, was minted in Ingolstadt. Also a lunar crater is named after Scheiner (diameter: 110 km [68 mi], height of embankment: 5,500 m [18,000 ft], named by Riccoli). A postage stamp was issued in Austria (2005). The town museum in Ingolstadt shows an oil painting (after 1732), also the Studienbibliothek Dillingen a fresco (painter Ignaz Schilling, 1702–1773).

== See also ==
- List of Jesuit scientists
- List of Roman Catholic scientist-clerics

== Literature ==
- Biagioli, Mario; Picturing Objects in the Making: Scheiner, Galilei and the Discovery of Sunspots, in: Ideals and Cultures of Knowledge in Early Modern Europe, Detel and Zittel (Hg.), Berlin 2002, 39–95.
- Casanovas, Juan; Early Observations of Sunspots: Scheiner and Galileo, in: 1st Advances in Solar Physics Euroconference, Advances in the Physics of Sunspots, ASP Conference Series 118, B. Schmieder, J. C. del Toro Iniesta, M. Vásquez (Hg.) (1997), 3–20.
- Daly, Peter M.; Dimler, G. Richard & Haub Rita; Imago Figurata Studies, Vol. 3, Brepols Publishers, Turnhout 2000, 133–144.
- Daxecker, Franz; Briefe Christoph Scheiners an Erzherzog Leopold V. von Österreich-Tirol von 1620–1632, in: Sammelblatt des Historischen Vereins Ingolstadt, 102/103, 1993/94, 401–404.
- Daxecker, Franz; Briefe des Naturwissenschaftlers Christoph Scheiner, Erzherzog Leopold V. von Österreich-Tirol, 1620–1632, Innsbruck 1995.
- Daxecker, Franz; The Physicist and Astronomer Christoph Scheiner: Biography, Letters, Works, Veröffentlichungen der Universität Innsbruck 246 (2004).
- Daxecker, Franz; Die Disputatio des Astronomen Christoph Scheiner, Acta Historica Astronomiae 23, Beiträge zur Astronomiegeschichte 7 (2004), 99–144.
- Daxecker, Franz; Scheiner, Christoph, Neue Deutsche Biographie 22, Berlin 2005, 638–648
- Daxecker, Franz; Christoph Scheiners Weg zur Optik, in: Ingolstädter Heimatblätter 3, 54,1991, 9–12. Johannes Hemleben, Galilei, Reinbek 1991.
- Daxecker Franz; Christoph Scheiners allgemeine Aussagen über Fernrohre, in: Die Jesuiten in Ingolstadt 1549–1773, Ingolstadt 1992, 140–143.
- Daxecker, Franz; Christoph Scheiner's eye studies, in: Documenta Ophthalmologica 81, 1992, 27–35;
- Daxecker, Franz; Christoph Scheiners Geburtsort und Geburtsjahr, Sammelblatt des Historischen Vereins Ingolstadt 107, 1998, 118–122.
- Daxecker, Franz; Christoph Scheiner und die Camera obscura, Acta Historica Astronomiae 28, Beiträge zur Astronomiegeschichte 8, 2006, 37–42.
- Daxecker, Franz; Christoph Scheiners Untersuchungen zur physiologischen Optik des Auges, in: Sammelblatt des Historischen Vereins Ingolstadt 102/103, 1993/1994, 385–399.
- Daxecker, Franz; Das Hauptwerk des Astronomen P. Christoph Scheiner SJ "Rosa Ursina sive Sol" – eine Zusammenfassung, Ber. nat.-med. Verein, Innsbruck 1996, Suppl. 13.
- Daxecker, Franz; Der Astronom P. Christoph Scheiner SJ als Bauleiter des ersten Jesuitenkirchen-Neubaues in Innsbruck, in: Tiroler Heimatblätter, 1996, 14–20.
- Daxecker, Franz; Der Naturwissenschaftler Christoph Scheiner SJ in der optischen Literatur. Ein medizinhistorischer Beitrag, in: Ber. nat.-med. Verein Innsbruck 80, 1993, 411–420.
- Daxecker, Franz; Der Physiker und Astronom Christoph Scheiner, Universitätsverlag Wagner, Innsbruck 2006.
- Daxecker, Franz; Further studies by Christoph Scheiner concerning the optics of the eye, in: Documenta Ophthalmologica 86, 1994, 153–161.
- Daxecker, Franz; Erzherzog Maximilian III., Erzherzog Leopold V. und die Astronomen Christoph Scheiner und Galileo Galilei, in: Tiroler Heimat 69, Innsbruck 2005, 7–16.
- Daxecker, Franz & Subaric, Lav; Briefe der Generaloberen P. Claudio Aquaviva SJ, P. Mutio Vitelleschi SJ und P. Vincenco Carafa an den Astronomen P. Christoph Scheiner SJ von 1614 bis 1649, in: Sammelblatt des Historischen Vereins Ingolstadt 111, 2002, 101–148.
- Daxecker, Franz; Christoph Scheiner und die Optik des Auges, in: Sonne entdecken, Ingolstadt 2000, 43–45.
- Daxecker, Franz; Lexikon für Theologie und Kirche 9, 2000, 120–121.
- Daxecker, Franz; Christoph Scheiners Hauptwerk "Rosa Ursina sive Sol", in: Sammelblatt des Historischen Vereins Ingolstadt 109, 2000, 43–57.
- Daxecker, Franz & Lav Subaric; Christoph Scheiners "Sol ellipticus", Veröffentlichungen der Universität Innsbruck 226, Innsbruck 1998.
- Daxecker, Franz; P. Christoph Scheiner und der Galilei-Prozeß, in: Sammelblatt des Historischen Vereins Ingolstadt, 108, Ingolstadt 1999, 111–112.
- Daxecker, Franz; "Über das Fernrohr" und weitere Mitschriften von Vorlesungen Christoph Scheiners, in: Acta Historica Astronomiae 13, Beiträge zur Astronomiegeschichte 4, 2001, 19–32.
- Daxecker Franz & Florian Schaffenrath; Ein Nachruf auf den Astronomen Christoph Scheiner aus dem Jahr 1650, in: Acta Historica Astronomiae 13, 2001, Beiträge zur Astronomiegeschichte 4, 33–45.
- Daxecker, Franz; Frontispize in den Werken P. Christoph Scheiners SJ, in: Emblematik und Kunst der Jesuiten in Bayern: Einfluß und Wirkung, Peter M. Daly, G. Richard Dimler SJ, Rita Haub (Hg.), Imago Figurata Studies, Vol. 3, Brepols Publishers, Turnhout 2000, 133–144
- Daxecker, Franz; Neue Dokumente zu Christoph Scheiner: Theses theologicae, Vorlesungsmitschriften und ein Nachruf aus dem Jahr 1650, in: Sammelblatt des Historischen Vereins Ingolstadt 110, 2001, 143–147.
- Daxecker, Franz; Schaffenrath, Florian; & Subaric, Lav; Briefe Christoph Scheiners von 1600 bis 1634, in: Sammelblatt des Historischen Vereins Ingolstadt 110, 2001, 117–141.
- Daxecker, Franz; Christoph Scheiners Lebensjahre zwischen 1633 und 1650, in: Acta Historica Astronomiae 15, Beiträge zur Astronomiegeschichte 5, 2002, 40–46;
- Daxecker, Franz; Der Physiker und Astronom Christoph Scheiner. Universitätsverlag Wagner, Innsbruck 2006
- Daxecker, Franz; Christoph Scheiner und der flüssige Himmel, in: Acta Historica Astronomiae 36, Beiträge zur Astronomiegeschichte 9, 2008, 26–36
- Duhr, Bernhard; Geschichte der Jesuiten in den Ländern deutscher Zunge in der ersten Hälfte des XVII. Jahrhunderts, 4 Bde., Freiburg i. Br. 1907, 1913 (Bde. 1 u. 2) – München 1921, 1928 (Bde. 3 u. 4), 2/2, 227, 435–436.
- Favaro, Antonio; Le Opere di Galileo Galilei, Edizione Nazionale, I-XX, Florence 1890–1909, Nachdruck Florenz 1968.
- Frieß, Peter; Christoph Scheiner und die dritte Dimension in der Malerei, in: Sammelblatt des Historischen Vereins Ingolstadt 109, 2000, 33–42.
- Gassendi, Petri; Diniensis Ecclesiae Praepositi, et in Academia Parisiensi Matheseos Regii Professoris Opera Omnia in sex tomos divisa, Florence 1727, VI, 38, 42–43, 49, 50, 370–371, 376, 377, 382.
- Goercke, Ernst; Christoph Scheiners Ausführungen über Glaslinsen und ein moderner Nachahmungsversuch, in: Die Sterne 66, 1990, 371–379.
- Goercke, Ernst; Daxecker, Franz; & Glasgucker, Pater; in: Die Sterne 70, 1994, 286–289.
- Gorman, Michael John; A Matter of Faith? Christoph Scheiner, Jesuit censorship and the Trial of Galileo, in: Perspectives on Science 4 (1996), 283–320.
- Gorman, Michael John; The Scientific Counter-revolution. Mathematics, natural philosophy and experimentalism in Jesuit culture 1580–c.1670 [PhD thesis], European University Institute, Florenz 1998.
- Granada, Miguel A.; Christoph Rothmann und die Auflösung der himmlischen Sphären. Die Briefe an den Landgrafen von Hessen-Kassel 1585, in: Beiträge zur Astronomiegeschichte 2, Acta Historica Astronomiae 5 (1999), 34–57.
- Haub, Rita; Jesuitenkolleg Neisse, in: Sonne entdecken, Ingolstadt 2000, 20.
- Haub, Rita; Zwei Briefe Christoph Scheiners an Matthäus Rader, in: Sonne entdecken. Christoph Scheiner 1575–1650, Ingolstadt 2000, 24–25.
- Haub, Rita; Christoph Scheiner – der Mensch. Sein Leben als Jesuit und Naturwissenschafter, in: Sammelblatt des Historischen Vereins Ingolstadt 109 (2000), 15–31.
- Haub, Rita; Christoph Scheiner – der Mensch. Sein Leben als Jesuit und Naturwissenschafter, in: Sammelblatt des Historischen Vereins Ingolstadt 109, 2000, 15–31.
- Hofmann, Siegfried; Christoph Scheiner – Galileo Galilei, in: Jesuiten in Ingolstadt 1549–1773, Ingolstadt 1992, 160–163.
- Ingaliso, Luigi; Filosofia e Cosmologia in Christoph Scheiner, Soveria Manelli: Rubettino 2005.
- Kern, Ralf; Wissenschaftliche Instrumente in ihrer Zeit. Vol. 2. Cologne, 2010. 273–276.
- Koch, Ludwig; Jesuiten-Lexikon. Die Gesellschaft Jesu einst und jetzt, Paderborn 1934, 1601f.
- Lukács Ladislaus; Catalogi Provinciae Austriae, Bd. 1 (1551–1600), Bd. 2 (1601–1640), Monumenta Historica Societatis Jesu, Rom 1978, 1982.
- Mauthner, Ludwig; Vorlesungen über die optischen Fehler des Auges, Vienna 1876, 122f., 866f.
- Mudry Anna; Galileo Galilei, Schriften, Briefe, Dokumente, 2 Bde., München 1987, Bd. 1, 145–159, Bd. 2, 87, 91, 102, 112, 264–266, 281, 286.
- Polgár, László; Bibliographie sur L‘Histoire de la Compagnie de Jésus 1901–1980, 3 Bde., Rom 1901–1980., Bd. 3.: R-Z.
- Nissel, Walter & Remes, Wilhelm; Die Jesuiten in der Philatelie, Rommerskirchen 2005.
- Ouwendijk, George; „Christoph Scheiner’s Cosmology: Fluid Heavens and the Question of Authority“, Vortragsmanuskript, Meeting der Renaissance Society of America, New York, 1.–3. April 2004, 1–10.
- Rösch, Herbert; Christoph Scheiner, in: Lebensbilder aus dem Bayerischen Schwaben, München 1959, 183–211.
- Reeves, Eileen, Christoph Scheiner in On Sunspots, Chicago 2010, 37–53.
- Schmidl, Johann; Historia Soc. Jesu Prov. Bohemiae, Prague 1747–1749.
- Shea, William R.; Galileo, Scheiner, and the Interpretation of Sunspots, in: Isis 61, 1970, 498–519
- Shea, William R.; Mariano Artigas, Galileo Galilei. Aufstieg und Fall eines Genies, Darmstadt 2006.
- Sommervogel, Carlos; Bibliothèque de la Compagnie de Jésus, 9 Bde., Brüssel-Paris 1890–1900 7, 734–740.
- Stoll, Hans; Christoph Scheiner, ein schwäbischer Astronom, in: Schwäbische Blätter für Volksbildung und Heimatpflege 9, 1958, 45–49.
- Tape, Walter Jarmo Moilanen, Atmospheric Halos and the Search of Angle x, Washington 2006.
- v. Braunmühl, Anton; Christoph Scheiner als Mathematiker, Physiker und Astronom (Bayerische Bibliothek 24), Bamberg 1891.
- v. Braunmühl, Anton; Originalbeobachtungen etc. aus der Zeit der Entdeckung der Sonnenflecken, in: Jahrbuch für Münchener Geschichte 5, 1894, 53–60.
- v. Rohr, Moritz; Ausgewählte Stücke aus Christoph Scheiners Augenbuch, in: Zeitschrift für ophthalmologische Optik 7 (1919), 35–44, 53–64, 76–91, 101–113, 121–133.
- v. Rohr, Moritz; Zur Würdigung von Scheiners Augenstudien, in: Archiv für Augenheilkunde 86 (1920), 247–263.
- van Helden, Albert; Galileo and Scheiner on Sunspots: A Case Study in the Visual Language of Astronomy, Proceedings of the American Philosophical Society 140 (1996), 358–396.
- Wickihalter, Rolf; 350 Jahre nach Galilei's Inquisitionsprozess – Eine Studie, in: physica didactica 11 (1984), Teil I, 37–60, Teil II, 63–73.
- Willisch, Norbert; Christoph Scheiner, der kannte die Sonn' wie sonst keiner .... Zum 350. Todestag des großen Gelehrten, in: Schlesischer Kulturspiegel 35, Würzburg 2000, 49–52.
- Wohlwill, Emil; Galilei und sein Kampf für die copernicanische Lehre, Bd. 1, 1909: 237, 396, 472–484, Bd. 2 1969: 102, 145, 163, 195, 393.
- Ziggelaar, August; Astronomie der Jesuiten nördlich der Alpen. Vier unveröffentlichte Jesuitenbriefe 1611–1620, in: Sammelblatt des Historischen Vereins Ingolstadt 102/103 (1993/94), 369–384.
- Ziggelaar, August; Scheiners "Vorläufer" von 1651. Neues Licht über den Galilei-Prozeß von 1632?, in: Sammelblatt des Historischen Vereins Ingolstadt 109, 2000, 89–104.
- Ziggelaar, August; Scheiner und Grassi Widersacher Galileis, in: physica didactica 13, 1986, 35–43.
- Zinner, Erns; Entstehung und Ausbreitung der coppernicanischen Lehre, Erlangen 1943, 347–353.
