= Concierto serenata =

1952 composition by Joaquín Rodrigo

The Concierto serenata for harp and orchestra was composed in 1952 by Joaquín Rodrigo. It was written for Nicanor Zabaleta, who premiered the work in Madrid on November 9, 1956; Odón Alonso conducted the Spanish National Orchestra. Zabaleta recorded it with the Berlin Radio Symphony Orchestra under Ernst Märzendorfer for Deutsche Grammophon three years later.

The concerto is in three movements; a typical performance lasts around 20 minutes. The first of the three movements represents a group of young musicians walking in the street; the third represents evening. The second is written in form of a canon.

The movements are:

1. Estudiantina (Allegro ma non troppo — Andante)
2. Intermezzo (Molto tranquillo)
3. Sarao (Allegro deciso)

== See also ==
- Complete recording of the premier performance in Madrid, 1956
- List of compositions for harp
