= Valeri Kikta =

Valeri Grigoryevich Kikta
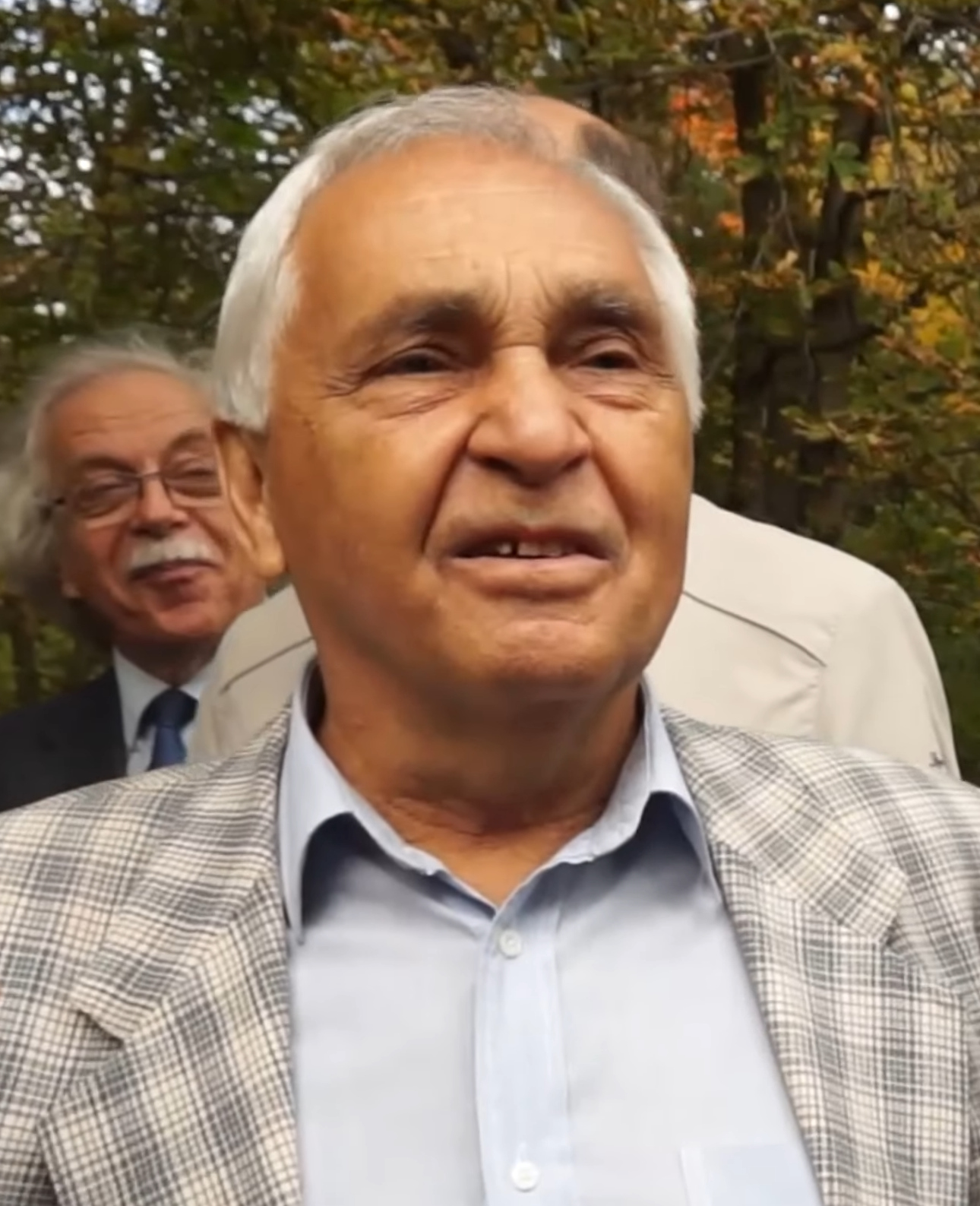
- Kikta in 2020
- Other name: Валерий Григорьевич Кикта
- Citizenship: Soviet Union → Russia
- Occupation: composer

Valeri Grigoryevich Kikta (October 22, 1941 in Volodymyrivka, Donetsk Oblast, Ukrainian SSR) is a Russian classical composer, a professor of the Moscow Conservatory.

He was educated at the Moscow Choral College, then at the Moscow Conservatoire under Semyon Bogatyrev and Tikhon Khrennikov. On the recommendation of Shostakovich he moved on to post-graduate study.

Kikta's compositions include ballets, symphonic, organ and choral works. These include Beyond the Verge of Darkness for tenor and orchestra, and Frescos of the St. Sofia Cathedral of Kyiv for harp and orchestra.

He was recorded extensively by the USSR state recording company, Melodiya in the 1970s and 1980s.
