= Anne-Marie Krumpholtz =

French harpist and composer

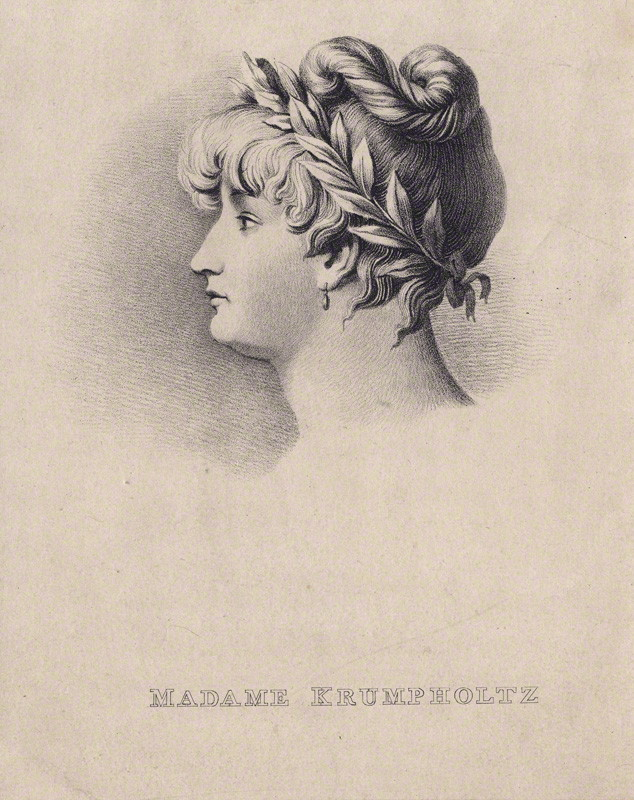
- Born: 1755 or 1766; Metz
- Died: 1823 or 1824; London
- Occupation: Composer, harpist
- Spouse(s): Jean-Baptiste Krumpholz
- Children: Fanny Krumpholtz Pittar

Anne-Marie Krumpholtz née Steckler (1766 - 1823) was a French harpist and composer.

== Life ==
Anne-Marie Steckler was the daughter of Christian Steckler, an instrument maker frequented by harpist and composer Johann Baptist Krumpholtz in Metz, France. She studied harp with Krumpholtz and made her debut in 1779, playing in concert with him at the Concerts Spirituel in Paris. Steckler married Krumpholtz on the death of his first wife and they had three children, but she left France with pianist Jan Ladislav Dussek to live in London about 1788. However, Dussek left her for Sophia Corri in 1792.

Anne-Marie Krumpholtz was a leading soloist and founded a tradition of professional stage performance on harp for women. Joseph Haydn wrote an aria accompaniment for her in his opera L’anima del filosofo: Orpheus & Eurydice. Her daughter Fanny Krumpholtz Pittar was also a harpist and composer.

== Works ==
Selected works include:

- Lison Dormoit
- A Favorite Piemontois Air with Variations by Dalvimare
- The Favorite Air of Pray Goody
- Robin Adair
