= Wenzel Krumpholz =

Wenzel Krumpholz or Václav Krumpholz (1750 – May 2, 1817) was a Bohemia-born musician who played mandolin and violin. He studied the mandolin at an early age and became one of the most renowned performers on this instrument. At a later date he adopted the violin also, for in 1796 he was one of the first violins in the orchestra of the Court Opera, Vienna.

Born in Zlonice, near Kladno, in Bohemia in the Holy Roman Empire, Krumpholz was the son of a bandmaster in a French regiment who lived in Paris during childhood, learning music from his father. His brother, Johann Baptist Krumpholz, was also a musician, a celebrated harpist and composer.

According to music historian Philip J. Bone, there was a strong friendship between Krumpholz and Ludwig van Beethoven. Bone wrote about the relationship between Krumpholz and Beethoven in his book The Guitar and Mandolin. He said that Krumpholz's name was "immortalized by his intimacy with Beethoven, who was exceedingly fond of the older man, and who used to jokingly call him mein Narr (my fool)."

According to Ferdinand Ries, Krumpholz gave Beethoven instruction on the violin and it is probable that he also instructed him on the mandolin. Carl Czerny wrote in his autobiography that it was Krumpholz who had first introduced him to Beethoven, and that Krumpholz was one of the first to recognize the young Beethoven's genius and inspired others with his own enthusiasm.

Bone wrote that Krumpholz frequently played the mandolin to Beethoven and indicated that it influenced the composer to write music for the instrument. He mentioned research done by Dominco Artaria, who had bought a Skizzenbook, containing sketches of some of Beethoven's music. Artaria stated in his Aittographische Skizze that Beethoven intended to write a sonata for mandolin and piano for Krumpholz. This composition is contained in Beethoven's sketchbook (preserved as (No. 29,801) in the manuscript department of the British Museum) and it was first published by Breitkopf and Hartel, Leipzig.

On the day following Krumpholz's death in Vienna, Beethoven composed the Gesang der Mönche from Schiller's William Tell, for three men's voices "in commemoration of the sudden and unexpected death of our Krumpholz". Only two of Krumpholz's compositions were known to have been published.

Krumpholz taught Jean-Joseph Benoit Pollet the mandolin. He also learned harp from his brother, Jean-Baptiste Krumpholz.

== Published compositions ==
- Abendunterhaltung for a single violin
- Ein Viertelstunde for a single violin
