= Markt Wald =

- Municipality
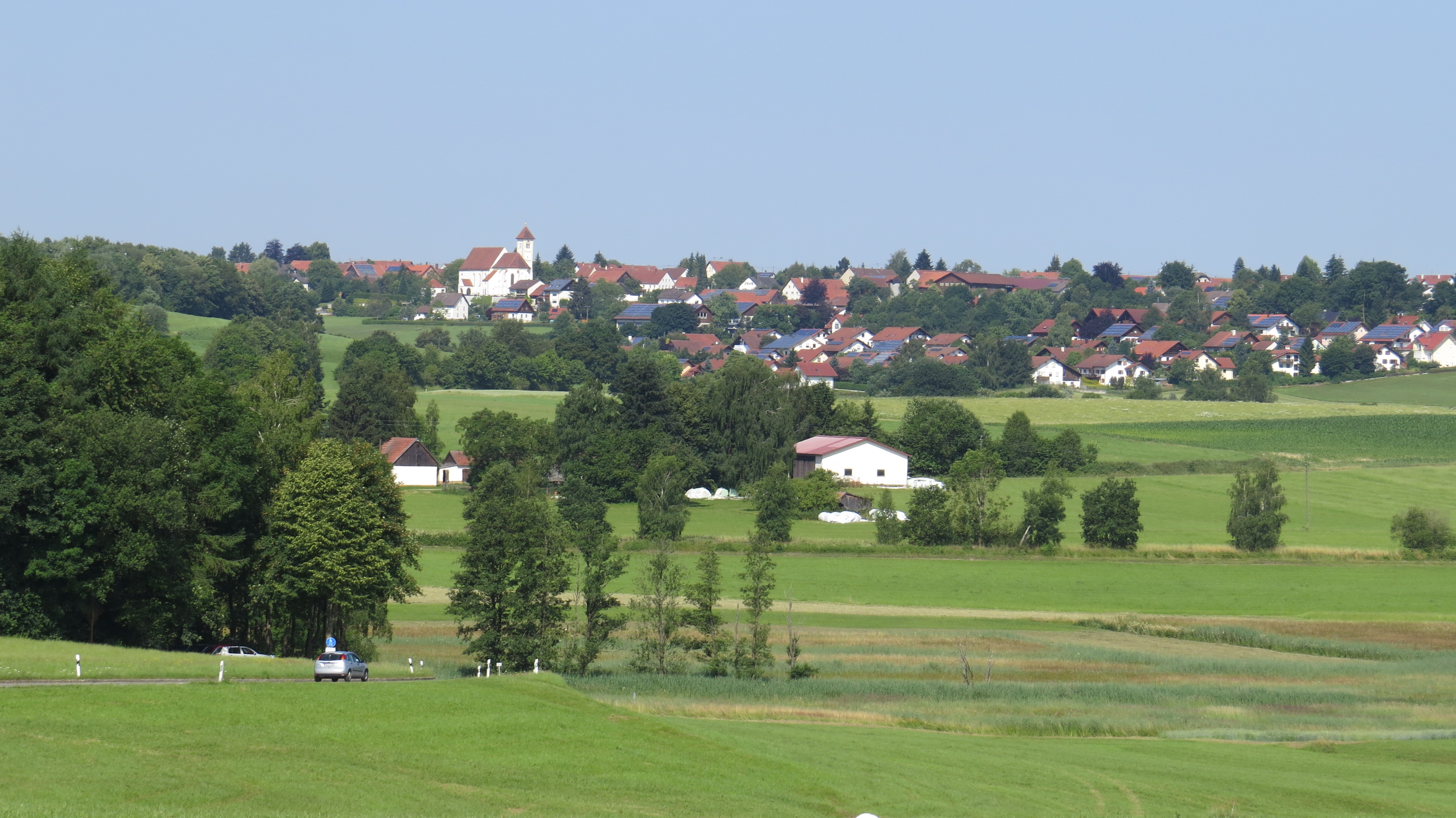
- Markt Wald seen from the east

- Coat of arms

- Location of Markt Wald within Unterallgäu district
- Interactive map of Markt Wald
- Location within Germany Location within Bavaria
- Coordinates: 48°8′N 10°35′E
- Country: Germany
- State: Bavaria
- Admin. region: Schwaben
- District: Unterallgäu

Government
  - Mayor (2024–30): Christian Demmler

Area
  - Total: 30.82 km^{2} (11.90 sq mi)
- Elevation: 544–644 m (1,785–2,113 ft)

Population (2025-12-31)
  - Total: 2,072
  - Density: 67.23/km^{2} (174.1/sq mi)
- Time zone: UTC+01:00 (CET)
  - Summer (DST): UTC+02:00 (CEST)
- Postal codes: 86865
- Dialling codes: 08262
- Vehicle registration: MN
- Website: www.marktwald.de

Markt Wald is a municipality in the district of Unterallgäu in Bavaria, Germany.

Christoph Scheiner was born in Markt Wald.
