= Jacob Hochbrucker =

French harp maker and musician (1673–1763)

- Born: 1673; Mindelheim, Bavaria, Germany
- Died: 28 May 1763 (aged 89–90)
- Occupations: Musician; harp maker

Jacob Hochbrucker (also spelled Jakob Hochprugger; 1673 – 28 May 1763) was an eighteenth-century harp maker and musician credited with the invention of the single-action pedal harp popularized in Europe between 1729 and 1750 by his descendants, and particularly by the Dauphine, Marie Antoinette, who performed on it after her arrival in Paris in 1770.

== Life and work ==
Hochbrucker was probably born in Mindelheim. From 1699, he lived and worked in Donauwörth, where he also built lutes and violas. Around 1720, Hochbrucker invented the pedal mechanism to play the harp, adding to the instrument five (later increased to seven) pedals and connecting them to the hooks for the C, D, F, G, and B strings, thus allowing the player to alter the strings sound of a semitone and greatly extend the range of the instrument. This ingenious chromatic system later became the subject matter of studies and extended considerations.

In the second half of the 18th century, the Hochbrucker mechanism was largely popularized by the efforts of his nephews, Christian and Celestine Hochbrucker, and mainly by his son Simon, who toured around Europe playing in Vienna in 1729, Leipzig and Brussels in 1734, Paris in 1740, and north Germany. At the beginning of the 19th century, in Paris, Sébastien Érard constructed the "harpe à double mouvement", patented in 1810, finally changing that which Hochbrucker had successfully developed.

== See also ==
- Cross-strung harp
- Bohemian harp

== Bibliography ==
- Rensch, Roslyn (1969). The Harp: Its History, Technique and Repertoire. Duckbacks. ISBN 978-0-7156-0467-0.
