= Francesco Petrini =

French harpist and composer (1744–1819)

Francesco Petrini (1744–1819) was a harpist and composer.

Petrini, whose father was the harpist of the chapel royal in Berlin, became famous in Paris for his compositions Variations and Concerto for Harp in E-flat major. Much of his work remains part of the standard harp repertoire today.

== Career ==
In 1765 Petrini was harper to the court of Mecklenburg Schwerin, from where he moved to Paris. In Paris he instructed many musicians, including Hinner, Marie Antoinette's harp master.

Through the patronage of the Princess de Lamballe he was able to publish his works, by monthly subscription, between 1779 and 1780. A second edition, also dedicated to de Lamballe, was published in 1783. In 1795 he published Systeme de l'Harmonie for harp.
