= François-Joseph Naderman =

François Joseph Naderman
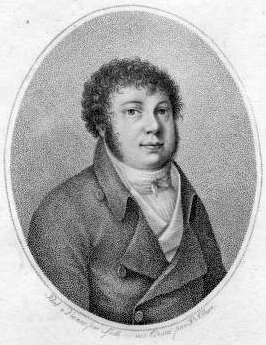

Background information
- Born: 5 August 1781; Paris, France
- Died: 2 April 1835 (aged 53) Paris, France
- Genres: Classical
- Occupations: Harpist, teacher, composer
- Instrument: Harp

François-Joseph Naderman (French pronunciation: [fʁɑ̃swa ʒozɛf nadɛʁmɑ̃]; 5 August 1781, in Paris – 2 April 1835, in Paris) was a classical harpist, teacher and composer, the eldest son of the well-known eighteenth century harp maker Jean Henri Naderman. The profession of his father, luthier, is certainly at the root of his vocation.

There are 27 entries for François Joseph Naderman in the combined Music Catalogue, including caprices, etudes, fantasias, variations and duets for harp and harp, harp and flute, harp and cello, harp and horn, with estimated dates of publication. His Sonatinas Progressives are still regarded as some of the most important works in the harp repertoire today.

== Life ==
A student of Jean-Baptiste Krumpholtz, François Joseph Naderman became a famous musician after the French Revolution, and his reputation continued under the Consulate, the First Empire and the Restoration of the monarchy. In 1815 he was appointed harpist for the Royal Chapel and court composer to the king, and in 1825 he became the first harp professor at the Conservatoire de Paris. His students included artist and composer Therese Emilie Henriette Winkel. He soon began touring around Europe as a virtuoso of the harp. He was a music publisher and a manufacturer of harps in Paris at "The Golden Key", on Rue de la Loi. After his death his widow continued to sell harps, including sheet music of her husband bearing the stamp-signature: Widow Naderman.

== Works ==
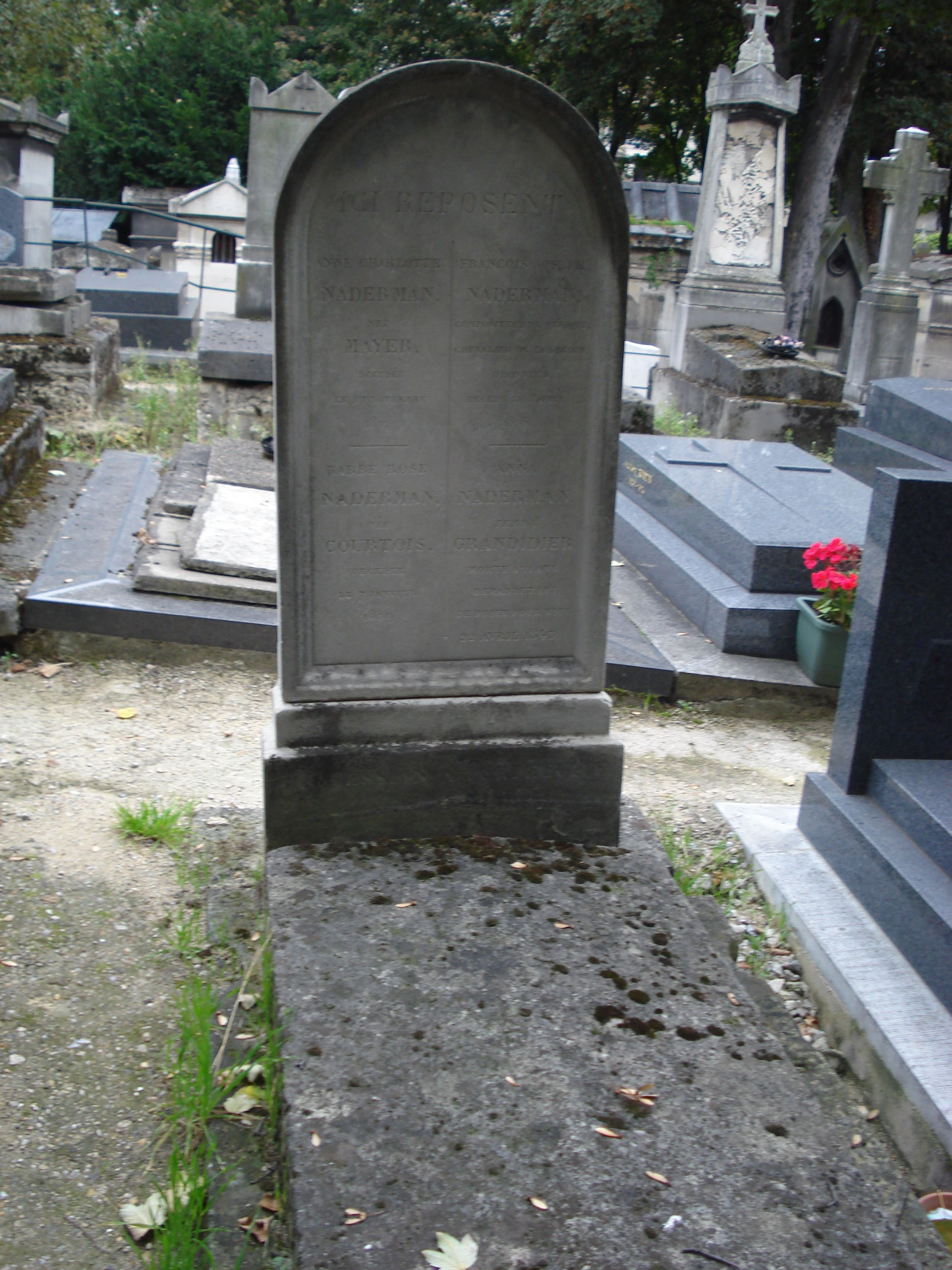
François-Joseph Naderman's grave at Montmartre cemetery

=== Music ===
- Etude Fantastique in B flat major
- Etude Fantastique in F major
- Variations on the last thought of Weber for solo Harp
- 3 Nocturnes for Harp and Horn, Op. 32
- Nocturne, Tyrolienne and Rondoletto
- 3 Sonatas for Harp, Violin and Cello, Op. 5
- Sonatinas Progressives for Harp, Op. 92:
  - Sonatina no 1 in E flat major
  - Sonatina no 2 in C minor
  - Sonatina no 3 in B flat major
  - Sonatina no 4 in G minor
  - Sonatina no 5 in F major
  - Sonatina no 6 in D minor
  - Sonatina no 7 in C major

=== Scores ===
- Come to Fields (love song), words of Mess. de Coupigni with accompaniment of guitar or lyre by Ferdinando Carulli.
  Note: (2 pages with the stamp-signature of the widow Naderman and the 3-cent stamp (of right) of the Seine department. Musical partition: piano, guitar or lyre and words in 4 verses of 4 lines each and a refrain.)
