= Charles Oberthür (composer) =

German-born harp player and composer

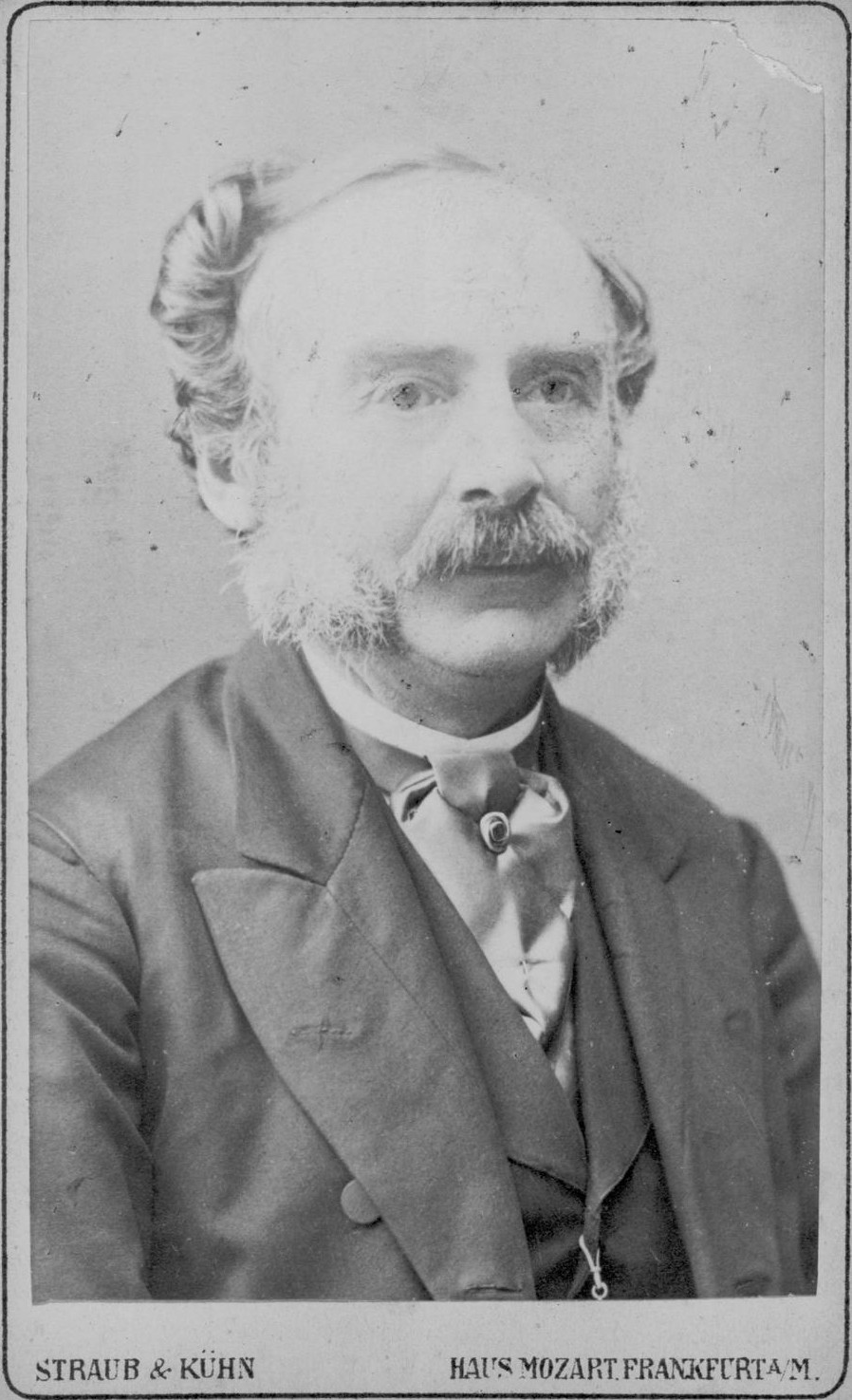
Charles Oberthür (1819–1895), German-born harp player and composer

Charles Oberthür (born as Carl Oberthür) (4 March 1819 – 8 November 1895) was a German harpist and composer active in Germany, Switzerland and England.

== Biography ==
The son of a violin maker, Oberthür was born in Munich, Germany. and studied the harp there with Elisa Brauchle and composition with Georg Valentin Röder (1776–1848), music director at the Bavarian court. He was successively employed at theatres in Zürich (1837), Wiesbaden (1839), and Mannheim (1842), before he settled in London, England, in 1844, initially as harpist at the Royal Italian Opera House. In 1861, he became the first Professor of Harp at the Royal Academy of Music, London. He died in London in 1895.

Oberthür was the composer of more than 450 works, most for or including the harp. He also published a useful harp method, his opus 36. His large-scale works have not been performed for many years and included the opera Floris de Namur (performed at Wiesbaden) and the cantatas The Pilgrim Queen, The Red Cross Knight, and Lady Jane Grey. As a harpist, he became "unrivalled as a virtuoso and teacher". A contemporary source described him as "the leading harpist in Britain, and on the Continent he is held in the highest esteem."

== Selected compositions ==
Harp solo

- Reminiscences de Suisse, Op. 3
- Souvenir de Genève, Op. 4
- Fantaisie et variations brillantes sur le Valse du désir, Op. 5
- Addio, mia vita, addio! Barcarolle, Op. 25
- Souvenir de Londres. Fantaisie et variations brillantes sur un thême original, Op. 26
- Bijou de Nabucco. Grande fantaisie sur l'opéra de Verdi, Op. 28
- Souvenir de Boulogne. Nocturne, Op. 30
- La Belle Emmeline. Impromptu, Op. 51
- Trois Mélodies religieuses, Op. 52
- The Nun's Prayer. Mélodie religieux, Op. 54
- Gems of German Songs. Twelve Recreations, Op. 61
- Le Désir, Op. 65
- Au bord de la mer. Nocturne, Op. 68
- Bel chiaro di luna. Impromptu, Op. 91
- Cradle Song (Wiegenlied), Op. 93
- Voyage en Suisse. Trois Morceaux originaux, Op. 99
- Pensées musicales. Trois Pièces de salon, Op. 110
- Stray Leaves. Three Sketches, Op. 114
- Fantaisie brillante on Motives of Flotow's Opera 'Martha', introducing 'The Last Rose of Summer', performed by the author before Her Majesty Queen Victoria, Op. 116
- Six Sacred Melodies, Op. 127
- Gems of Verdi. Twelve operatic airs, Op. 149
- La Sylphide. Morceau caractéristique, Op. 150
- Seaside Rambles. Four Musical Sketches, Op. 158
- Le Réveil des elfes. Morceau caractéristique, Op. 181
- A Fairy Legend, Op. 182
- Erin, oh! Erin! Mélodie irlandaise favorite, Op. 183
- The Harp that once through Tara's Hall. Transcription of a favoured Irish air, Op. 187
- Old English Melodies (Englische Melodien aus alter Zeit), Op. 221
- Within a mile of Edinbro' Town. Capriccio, Op. 285
- Conte de fées. Caprice, Op. 301 – see YouTube video of performance
- Rêverie. Impromptu, Op. 314
- Le Papillon. Caprice, Op. 317 - see YouTube video of a performance

Harp and orchestra

- Concertino for harp and orchestra, Op. 175 (c.1863)
- Loreley, Op. 180
- Orpheus, Op. 253 – see YouTube video of live performance

Orchestra

- Rübezahl Ouvertüre, Op. 82 (1867)
- Vorspiel zu 'Shakespeare, ein Winternachtstraum', Op. 210 (1885)

Chamber music

- Souvenir à Schwalbach, Op. 42 for horn and harp
- Mon séjour à Darmstadt, Op. 90 for horn and harp
- Trio, Op. 139 for violin, cello, harp
- Trio, Op. 162 for violin, cello, harp (1867)
- Orpheus, Op. 253 for harp and piano
- Berceuse, Op. 299 for violin and harp (1885)
- Sweet Dreams, Op. 300 for clarinet and piano

== Selected recordings ==
- La Sylphide, Op. 150, performed by Catherine Eisenhoffer, on: Gallo CD-622 (1990)
- La Sylphide, Op. 150, performed by Marielle Nordmann, on: Erato 2292-45482-2 (1990)
- Le Réveil des Elfes, Op. 181; A Fairy Legend, Op. 182; Conte de Fées, Op. 301, performed by Elizabeth Jane Baldry, on: Campion Cameo 2025
- Berceuse, Op. 299, performed by Frances Mason and Jenny Broome, on: Hommage aux Demoiselles Eissler, MMC Recordings MMC 123 (2018)
