= Jean-Baptiste Krumpholz =

Czech composer and harpist (1742–1790)

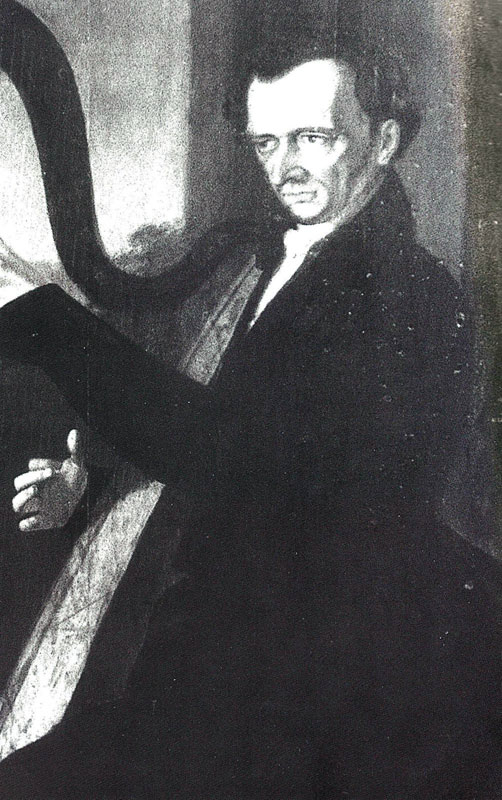

Jean-Baptiste Krumpholz (French pronunciation: [ʒɑ̃batist kʁœ̃fɔlz]; Czech: Jan Křtitel Krumpholtz) (8 May 1742 – 19 February 1790) was a Czech composer and harpist who lived in the Holy Roman Empire.

== Biography ==
Krumpholz was born in, near Zlonice. He was the brother of Wenzel Krumpholz, violinist and mandolin player. He learned music from his father while growing up in Paris; in 1773 he played a successful harp concerto in the Burgtheater in Vienna. After serving three years in Count Esterházy's court orchestra (1773–1776), during which he is said to have taken counterpoint lessons with Joseph Haydn, he embarked on a successful concert tour of Europe. In Paris and Metz, he worked along with manufacturers Jean Henri Naderman, his son François Joseph Naderman, and Sébastien Érard towards improving the construction of the harp. He composed concertos and sonatas for harp and chamber music.

Krumpholz drowned himself in the Seine after his wife—former pupil Anne-Marie Krumpholtz (1755–1824), also a virtuoso harpist—eloped to London. He was 47. The story that this was with pianist Jan Ladislav Dussek is apocryphal.

== Style ==
Krumpholz composed 52 sonatas, 6 concertos and many preludes and variations for the harp. He wrote also harp duets, quartets and 4 sonatas for harp, 2 violins, 2 French horns and cello.

Selected works

- Sonate für Flöte oder Violine und Harfe oder Klavier (published by H. J. Zingel in 1933)
- Sonata B dur pro harfu (Sonata in B-flat major for Harp) (published in 1935 by M. Zunová)
- Concertus in SI b mai ab arpa cum choro musico

== Articles ==
- Floraleda Sacchi, Krumpholtz, Aulia, 2005.

== CD ==
- Floraleda Sacchi, J.K. Krumpholtz: Sei Sonate op. 8 per flauto e arpa (Aulia, 2005).
