= Maïa Darmé =

Maïa Darmé is a French harpist, singer and composer. She performs as a classical soloist and chamber musician as well as developing projects in world music, jazz, pop rock, and electronic music.

She plays the pedal harp, electric harp, and various traditional and historical harps, often switching between instruments during concerts.

== Early life and education ==
Maïa Darmé began learning the Celtic harp at age six while living in Brittany. She later studied classical harp at the Bordeaux Conservatoire and Paris Conservatoire. Among her teachers were notable French harpists such as Elisabeth Fontan-Binoche, Xavier de Maistre, Marie-Pierre Langlamet and Isabelle Moretti. She won first prize by unanimous decision at the international UFAM competition.

She relocated to Australia for a Bachelor of Music at the Australian National University under the guidance of Alice Giles, then studied composition and electronic music in New York, at Columbia University's Computer Music Center. She earned a Master's degree in Jazz Harp from the Milan Conservatory and also holds a Master's degree in International Affairs from Sciences Po Paris. She is the recipient of an Arts Initiative grant from the Gatsby Foundation.

== Career ==
Darmé has toured across Europe, the Americas, Asia and Africa, headlining concerts in over 35 countries. She has performed in major classical music venues including the Berlin Philharmonie, the Vienna Musikverein, the Great Festival House of Salzburg as well as in various national theaters and festivals.

As a classical soloist, she has collaborated with orchestras such as the Moroccan Philharmonic Orchestra, Ukrainian National Radio Orchestra, Dominican Republic National Symphony Orchestra, Tunisian Symphony Orchestra, Cali Philharmonic Orchestra, Caldas Symphony Orchestra, Aquitaine Symphony Orchestra, Kamerata Kuala Lumpur and Camerata Caribensis.

She has performed frequently in Tunisia, notably at the Festival International de Musique d’El Jem, International Festival of Carthage, Carthage Film Festival, Acropolium of Carthage, Center for Arabic and Mediterranean Music, Hergla Festival, Tunis Municipal Theater and Cité de la Culture. She developed new playing techniques to produce microtones on the harp, allowing her to perform Middle Eastern music alongside traditional instruments like the qanun in her band Harkan.

She is known for collaborating with living composers to expand the repertoire of her instrument. Media coverage indicates that she gave the world premiere of over 40 works dedicated to her, including pieces by Paul Lewis and new harp concerto Solstice Lunaire by Carlos Andrés Mejia Zuluaga.

== Recordings ==
- Entre deux Souffles, 2025, with flutist Sylvain Millepied, label Memento.
- Nomade, 2019, solo visual album.
