= Swingtime! =

1995 album by Canadian Brass

Studio album by Canadian Brass
- Released: 1995
- Genre: Jazz

Canadian Brass chronology
Bolero and Other Classical Blockbusters (1995)	Swingtime! (1995)	Go for Baroque! (1995)

Swingtime! is an album by the Canadian Brass, released in 1995. The album featured arrangements of several jazz standards.

== Track listing ==
- 1. "Artistry in Rhythm" (Stan Kenton) (5:05)
- 2. "Blue Rondo a la Turk" (Dave Brubeck) (4:29)
- 3. "Back Home in Indiana" (James F. Hanley-Ballard MacDonald) (3:13)
- 4. "Night and Day" (Cole Porter) (3:00)
- 5. "'Round about Midnight" (Thelonious Monk-Cootie Williams-Bert Hanighen) (5:03)
- 6. "At the Woodchopper's Ball" (Joe Bishop-Woody Herman) (3:21)
- 7. "The Lady is a Tramp" (Richard Rodgers-Lorenz Hart) (3:45)
- 8. "Sugar Blues" (Clarence Williams-Lucy Fletcher) (2:47)
- 9. "The Man I Love" (George Gershwin-Ira Gershwin) (3:32)
- 10. "Whatever Happened To The Dream" (Luther Henderson) (2:48)
- 11. "Concierto de Aranjuez" (Joaquin Rodrigo) (9:10)
- 12. "I Found Love" (Chris Dedrick) (3:35)
- 13. "Ellington Medley" (4:03)
  - (a) "Mood Indigo" (Duke Ellington-Barney Bigard-Irving Mills)
  - (b) "Don't Get Around Much Anymore" (Duke Ellington-Bob Russell)
  - (c) "Take the "A" Train" (Billy Strayhorn)
- 14. "One O'Clock Jump" (Count Basie) (4:39)

(Tracks 1, 6, 13 and 14 arranged by Don Sebesky. Tracks 2, 4, 5, 7, 9, 10, 11 and 12 arranged by Chris Dedrick. Tracks 3 and 8 arranged by Luther Henderson.)

== Personnel ==
The Canadian Brass:

- Charles Daellenbach: tuba
- Fred Mills: trumpet
- David Ohanian: horn
- Ronald Romm: trumpet
- Eugene Watts: trombone

Also featuring:

- Warren Bernhardt: piano on tracks 2 and 5; keyboards on tracks 1, 16, 13 and 14
- Natalie Cenovia Cummins: violin on tracks 5 and 11
- Crystal Garner: viola on tracks 5 and 11
- Gordon Gottlieb: percussion on tracks 1, 2, 6, 11, 13 and 14
- Evan Johnson: violin on tracks 5 and 11
- Karen Karlsrud: violin on tracks 5 and 11
- Maria Kitsopoulos: cello on tracks 5 and 11
- John Miller: bass on tracks 1, 5, 6, 11, 13 and 14
- Richard Stoltzman: clarinet on track 6
- Joe Taylor: guitar on track 14
- Belinda Whitney-Barratt: violin on tracks 5 and 11
- Ronnie Zito: drums on tracks 1, 5, 6, 13 and 14

The Canadian Brass Jazz All-Stars appear on tracks 1, 6, 13 and 14. The personnel for this ensemble is as follows:

- Don Sebesky: leader
- Neil Balm: trumpet
- Warren Bernhardt: keyboard
- Gene Bertoncini: guitar
- Rick Baptist: trumpet
- Bob Carlisle: French horn on tracks 1 & 13
- Larry Farrell: trombone
- Paul Faulise: bass trombone
- Lawrence Feldman: alto sax, flute, piccolo and clarinet on tracks 6 & 14
- Peter Gordon: French horn on tracks 1 & 13
- Gordon Gottlieb: percussion
- Ken Hitchcock: tenor sax, bass clarinet and clarinet on tracks 6 & 14
- Tony Kadleck: trumpet
- Jeff Lang: French horn on tracks 1 & 13
- John Miller: bass
- Kevin O'Quinn: trombone
- Joe Passaro: percussion
- Roger Rosenberg: bass clarinet, baritone sax and flute on tracks 6 & 14
- Dave Tofani: tenor sax, flute and clarinet on tracks 6 & 14
- Chuck Wilson: also sax, flute and clarinet on tracks 6 & 14
- Ronnie Zito: drums

Three tracks on this album also feature archival jazz recordings from the 1950s:

- "Night and Day" features a performance from the Zoot Sims Quartet, recorded at the Vogue Studios in Paris in 1950. The lineup was: Zoot Sims: tenor saxophone, Gerry Wiggins: piano, Pierre Michelot: bass, Kenny Clarke: drums.
- "The Lady Is a Tramp" features a performance from the Gerry Mulligan Quartet, recorded live at the Salle Pleyel in Paris on June 3, 1954. The lineup was: Gerry Mulligan: baritone sax, Bob Brookmeyer: valve trombone, Red Mitchell: bass, Frank Isola: drums.
- "The Man I Love" features a performance by Roy Eldridge, recorded at the Vogue Studios in Paris on June 9, 1950. The lineup for this performance was: Roy Eldridge: trumpet, Zoot Sims: tenor saxophone, Dick Hyman: piano, Pierre Michelot: bass, Ed Shaughnessy: drums.

The album was produced and mixed by Steve Vining.
