= Coline-Marie Orliac =

French harpist

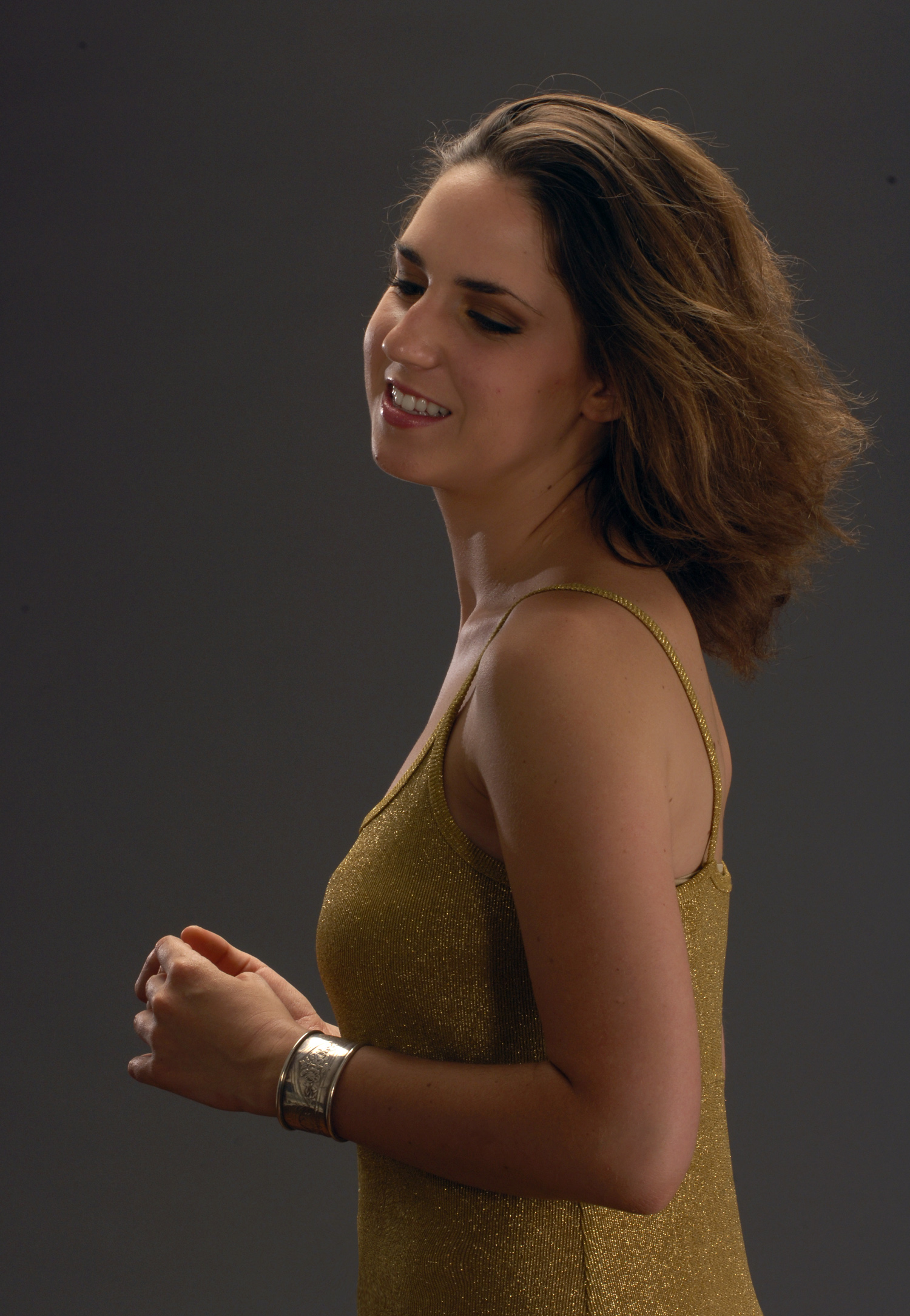
- Born: 1989 (age 35–36)
- Occupation: Harpist

Coline-Marie Orliac (born 1989) is a French harpist. A graduate of the Curtis Institute of Music, she has performed with leading orchestras including the Berlin Philharmonic.

== Musical education ==
Orliac studied at the Nice Conservatoire, receiving two diplomas of musical studies and first prizes in harp and piano. She went on to the Curtis Institute of Music, where she studied with Judy Loman, former principal of the Toronto Symphony, and Elizabeth Hainen, principal of the Philadelphia Orchestra. She received a Bachelor of Music degree and was awarded the Joan Hutton Landis Award for Excellence in Academics. Ms. Orliac performed frequently with the Curtis Symphony Orchestra, Curtis Opera Theatre orchestra, and on the Curtis Student Recital Series. While at Curtis, she participated in master classes with María-Luisa Rayan, Isabelle Perrin, Yolanda Kondonassis, Gretchen van Hoesen, and Lionel Party, and she performed in a concert sponsored by the Philadelphia Harp Society. She has also studied with Elizabeth Fontan-Binoche; Judith Liber, former principal harp of the Israel Philharmonic Orchestra; Isabelle Moretti from the Paris Conservatoire; Marie-Pierre Langlamet, principal harp of the Berlin Philharmonic; and with Susann McDonald and Elzbieta Szmyt at Indiana University, USA.

== Career ==
In 2006, Ms. Orliac was invited by Claudio Abbado to tour Europe with the Gustav Mahler Youth Orchestra. She has also performed with the Pittsburgh Youth Symphony Orchestra, the Chamber Orchestra of Nice, and the Mendelssohn Club of Philadelphia choir, and at the Spivakov Festival in Moscow and the 2015 and 2016 Newport Music Festivals.

In December 2009, she was invited to perform with the Philadelphia Orchestra conducted by Neeme Järvi, and in July 2009, she was a harpist of the Berlin Philharmonic Orchestra under the baton of Simon Rattle at the Festival d’Aix-en-Provence. During the festival, she was also part of the Académie Européene de Musique where she performed chamber music with Jeremy Findler and Luiz Filipe Coelho. Two months prior to this, Orliac was invited to become a member of the Dolce Suono Chamber Music Concert Series, where she regularly performs with members of the Philadelphia Orchestra.

== Awards ==
At the Seventh and Tenth USA International Harp Competition, she was a top prize winner and was twice awarded the Mario Falcao Prize for best performance of the piece written for the competition. She also won first prize in the 2005 UFAM International Harp Competition and second prize in the Vera Dulova Harp Competition in Moscow — the first French harpist ever to receive this award.

In 2008, Orliac was a prize winner of the Concours International de Harpe de la Cité des Arts de Paris and was the only candidate to be awarded a special prize for the best performance of Damase’s “Thème and Variations”. Additionally, she was named a finalist in the Philadelphia Orchestra Albert M. Greenfield Student Competition and won second prize in the Riverside Symphonia Caprio Young Artists Competition in Lambertville, New Jersey. The same year, she was invited to perform harp-trombone duets at the Tenth World Harp Congress in Amsterdam.
