= James Strauss (flautist) =

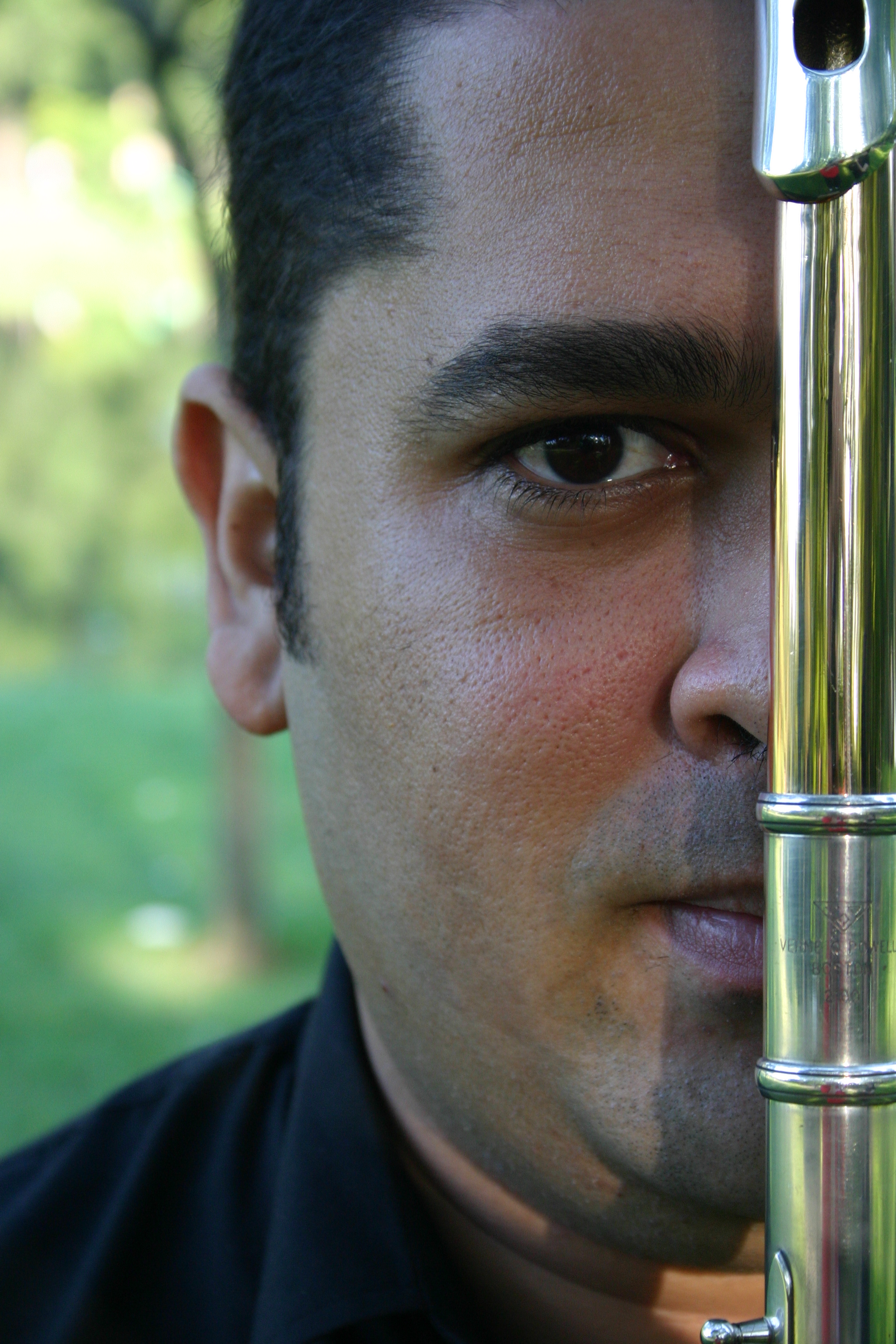
- James Strauss
- Born: November 29, 1974 (age 51); Recife, Brazil
- Occupation: Classical flutist from Brazil

James Strauss (born November 29, 1974, in Recife, Pernambuco) is a Brazilian flautist and musicologist.

== Biography ==
Strauss began taking violin lessons from his father when he was four years old, but switched to the flute a few years later. He graduated from the Paris Conservatory with Pierre-Yves Artaud, Maurice Pruvot, and Lazslo Hadadi. Concurrently he studied Flute with Jean-Pierre Rampal. His career as a flute soloist started in 1991 with his performance with the Festival Orchestra of the 23rd Music Festival in Campos do Jordão, conducted by Júlio Medaglia.

In 1999, he moved to Finland, and began looking for Piotr Ilyitch Tchaikovsky's legendary "Flute Concerto", of which Rampal had seen a page in the 1960s in the Soviet Union. He eventually found three pieces of the original composition (one in St. Petersburg, one in Finland, one in Klin) and reconstructed from them the Concertstück for Flute, TH 247, now catalogued as a posthumous work by Tchaikovsky. From 2017 to 2020 James Strauss publishes the albums Mozart Discoveries, Latin Connections, Venezuelan Elegy, produced by Danilo Alvarez

== Appearances ==
Strauss has performed with leading symphony and chamber orchestras in Japan, Israel, Central and Western Europe, and Scandinavia. He has also performed at venues including the Châtelet in Paris, Tokyo's Suntory Hall, NJPAC in New Jersey, Sala São Paulo in São Paulo, and at festivals in France, Brazil, the United States, Argentina and Israel. In January 2007, he appeared at the Orchestra Hall in Oxford, Ohio, with the Oxford Chamber Orchestra.

== Commissioned concertos ==
René Gerber, Solfa Carlile, Dimitri Cervo, Daisuke Soga, Kenny Choy, João Linhares, Antonio Ribeiro and Glenn Roger Davis have composed commissioned concertos for him; more are being composed.

== Flute ==
His 14-carat gold flute was made by the Powell Flutes team.

== Discography ==
Strauss has released two CDs with the Israeli Virtuosi, and four more in 2007 with repertoire ranging from Antonio Vivaldi to modern Brazilian music. He has also recorded the 24 Paganini Caprices, arranged for flute.

- James Strauss Plays Beethoven
  James Strauss, flute; Regina Glasunova, piano; Miyo Umezu, Violin; Olli Varonen, cello
- Raiders of the lost Tchaikovsky (CD/DVD)
  Heitor Villa-Lobos, Haydn, Paganini, Ponce, A. Tchaikovsky, P. Tchaikovsky, Dinicu, Rimsky-Korsakov
  January 31 recording of The Oxford Chamber Orchestra conducted by Ricardo Averbach.
- Made in Brazil
  James Strauss, flute; Israeli Virtuosi; Ada Pelleg, conductor
- Tchaikovsky Flute Concerto
  James Strauss, flute; Israeli Virtuosi; Ada Pelleg, conductor
- Portrait (CD sample 1999, Point Classics)
  Vivaldi · Ribeiro · Gluck · Liebermann · Mercadante · Debussy · Randall
  James Strauss, flute; Orquestra de Camara Theatro São Pedro, Capriccioso Chamber Orchestra, Antunes Câmera

== Honors ==
- UFAM Concours International de flute, first prize, 1998
- UFAM Concours International de Chamber Music, first prize, 1999
- Concours International de flute de la Ville de Lempdes, first prize, 1997
