= Canadian Brass =

Chamber music ensemble

- Origin: Toronto, Ontario, Canada
- Genre: Classical
- Years active: 1971–present
- Labels: CBC; Boot; Welk Music Group; Vanguard; RCA Red Seal; CBS Masterworks; Philips; RCA Victor; Opening Day Entertainment Group
- Members: Charles Daellenbach; Jeff Nelsen; Keith Dyrda; Joe Burgstaller; Mikio Sasaki
- Past members: See members section

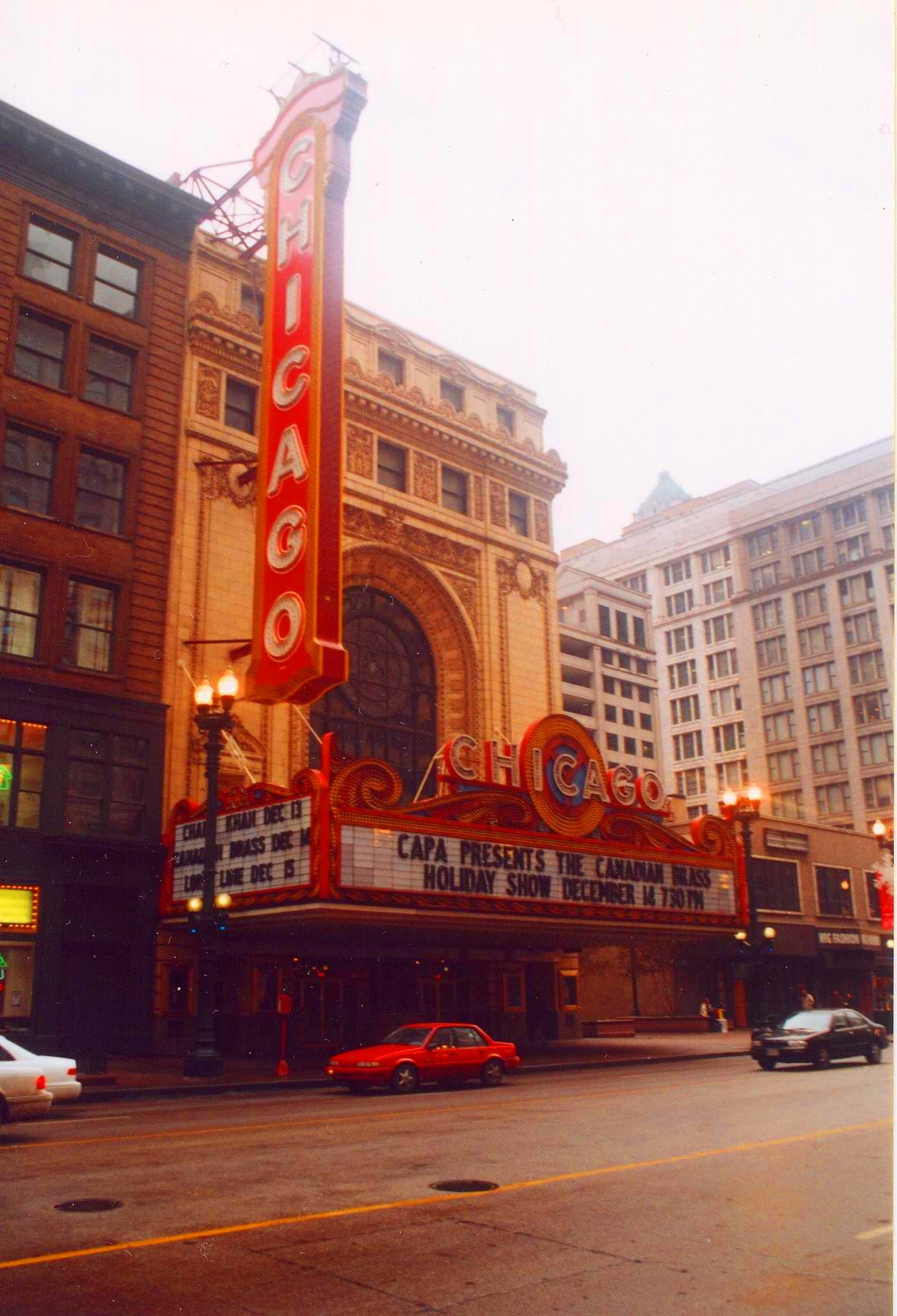
Balaban and Katz Chicago Theatre

Canadian Brass is a Canadian brass quintet formed in 1970 in Toronto, Ontario, by Charles Daellenbach (tuba) and Gene Watts (trombone), with horn player Graeme Page and trumpeters Stuart Laughton and Bill Phillips completing the quintet. As of August 2026, Daellenbach is the sole original member in the group, with the other members being trumpeters Joe Burgstaller and Mikio Sasaki, hornist Jeff Nelsen, and trombonist Keith Dyrda.

The group is known for the use of humor in their live performances and an irreverent attitude that includes their signature attire of formal black suits with white running shoes. They have performed internationally and have recorded more than 170 CDs and DVDs. They have commissioned, performed, and recorded hundreds of transcriptions and original works for brass quintet. Canadian Brass has a library of more than 1000 compositions and arrangements written specifically for them.

The quintet was named as "one of the most popular brass ensembles in the world" in 2015 by The Washington Post. They have appeared on all the major North American TV networks, The Tonight Show Starring Johnny Carson, CBS Sunday Morning, and Hunan TV in China.

== History ==
The Canadian Brass originally included "Ensemble" in its name, but in 1971, the Hamilton Philharmonic's then-music director Betty Webster suggested that the quintet should be officially named the Canadian Brass.

Canadian Brass made its American debut at the Kennedy Center in Washington, D.C. in 1975. A significant international visit was made in 1977 when they were sent to mainland China as a cultural exchange between Canada and China. The ensemble was chosen and sent on this cultural mission by then-Prime Minister Pierre Elliott Trudeau. They are now remembered in China as the first Western musicians allowed into China after the Cultural Revolution had suppressed Western art and music.

In 1979, the Canadian Brass became the first chamber ensemble to solo the main stage at Carnegie Hall. As The New York Times reported, their sold-out performance "clearly establishes the Canadian Brass as a main-stage attraction." In addition to their heavy international touring schedule for nearly 50 years, and their extensive recording catalog, they have been on the Billboard charts in each decade of their existence, recording for RCA Records, BMG, Columbia Records, SONY, Philips Decca, Steinway Label, Opening Day Entertainment and now Canadian Brass Recordings occupying virtually all the spots open to brass players. As of 2020, Canadian Brass recordings have been released by Toronto-based Canadian Brass Store.

The first recordings the Brass created were for the CBC Radio transcription service, CBC Records, including their very first major concert in Toronto the summer of 1971. Record producer Eleanor Sniderman discovered the group and put the group on its first commercial LPs in 1973 and 1974, which then attracted major artist management in New York City. In 1977, the same year the Brass represented North America in the People's Republic of China, a live radio broadcast on WQXR was heard by multi-Grammy award-winning producer Jay Saks, who was impressed, and brought the group to the prestigious RCA Red Seal label. The ensemble was then scouted by CBS records, soon to be Sony, where they recorded with the Berlin Philharmonic, New York Philharmonic and Boston Symphony brass players, establishing a repertoire that is now standard for expanded brass ensembles.

When the group's former manager, Costa Pilavachi, assumed the post of "Head of A&R" at Philips Records in the Netherlands, he lured the Brass to his new label, establishing a new European presence for the group. In 1992, the Brass returned to RCA, releasing fourteen albums in eight years, including Bach's Goldberg Variations, for which the group won a German Echo award.

== Members ==
=== Current ===
- Charles Daellenbach – tuba (1970–present)
- Jeff Nelsen – French horn (2001–2004, 2007–2010, 2018–present)
- Keith Dyrda – trombone, euphonium (2010–2011, 2024-present)
- Joe Burgstaller – trumpet, piccolo trumpet (2001–2004, 2007–2009, 2023-present))
- Mikio Sasaki — trumpet (2024–present)

=== Past ===
- Trumpets
  - Stuart Laughton – trumpet (1970–1971, 2003–2005)
  - Bill Phillips – trumpet (1970–1972; died 2023)
  - Ronald Romm – trumpet, piccolo trumpet (1971–2000; "Trumpet Dream Team", 2006–2010)
  - Fred Mills – trumpet, piccolo trumpet (1972–1996; died 2009)
  - Jens Lindemann – trumpet, piccolo trumpet (1996–2001)
  - Ryan Anthony – trumpet, piccolo trumpet (2000–2003; "Trumpet Dream Team", 2006–2010; died 2020)
  - Charles Lazarus – trumpet (("Trumpet Dream Team", 2005)
  - Justin Emerich – trumpet (("Trumpet Dream Team", 2005–2006)
  - Jeroen Berwaerts – trumpet ("Trumpet Dream Team", 2006–2010)
  - Brandon Ridenour – trumpet ("Trumpet Dream Team", 2006–2010; 2009–2013; 2019-2022)
  - Manon Lafrance – trumpet ("Trumpet Dream Team", 2006–2010)
  - Chris Coletti – trumpet (2009–2019)
  - Caleb Hudson – trumpet, piccolo trumpet (2013-2023)
  - Fabio Brum – trumpet (("Trumpet Dream Team", 2022–2023)
  - Ashley Hall-Tighe — trumpet (("Trumpet Dream Team", 2023–2024)
- French Horn
  - Graeme Page – French horn (1970–1983)
  - Martin Hackleman – French horn (1983–1986)
  - David Ohanian – French horn (1986–1998)
  - Christopher Cooper – French horn (1998–2000)
  - Bernhard Scully – French horn (2004–2007, 2013–2017)
  - Eric Reed – French horn (2010–2013)
- Trombone/Euphonium
  - Gene Watts – trombone, euphonium (1970–2010)
  - Achilles Liarmakopoulos – trombone, euphonium (2011–2024)

== Awards and honours ==
Their awards range from three honorary doctorates to Grammy, Canadian Juno and German Echo recording awards.

Founding member Daellenbach was appointed to the Order of Canada, the country's highest civilian honour, in 2014. In accepting this appointment, he said,

"not only do I accept this appointment for my family and myself, but on behalf of the incredible colleagues that accompanied me on this unbelievable musical journey... firstly Watts, Mills, Romm, Page and Ohanian and now the '2nd generation' colleagues of today!"

Their album Canadiana was a Juno Award nominee for Instrumental Album of the Year at the Juno Awards of 2023.

== Discography ==
- Canadian Brass (CBC, 1971)
- Rag-Ma-Tazz (CBC, 1973)
- Make We Joy – with Festival Singers of Canada (CBC, 1973)
- Royal Fanfare (Vanguard, 1973)
- Canadian Brass in Paris (Boot, 1974)
- Canadian Brass (Boot, 1974)
- Canadian Brass: Pachelbel to Joplin (Welk Group, 1974)
- Plays/Joue Rags (Radio Canada 1974)
- Rag-Ma-Tazz (Vanguard, 1975)
- Pucker & Valve Society Band (Umbrella, 1975)
- Joyful Sounds (CBC, 1976)
- National Arts Center Orchestra with the Canadian Brass (CBC, 1976)
- Canadian Brass (Umbrella, 1977)
- Canadian Brass Encore (CBC, 1977)
- Unexplored Territory (CBC, 1977)
- Toccata, Fugues & Other Diversions (Umbrella,1977)
- Bells & Brass (Good Day, 1978)
- Mostly Fats: The Canadian Brass Plays Fats Waller's Greatest Hits (RCA, 1979)
- Unexplored Territory (CBC, 1978) (#89 CAN) (single - "The Joust" #38 CAN AC)
- The Pachelbel Canon: The Canadian Brass Plays Great Baroque Music (RCA, 1980)
- A Touch of Brass (CBC, 1980)
- The Village Band: A Nostalgic Recollection (RCA, 1980)
- Christmas with the Canadian Brass and the Great Organ of St. Patrick's Cathedral (RCA, 1981)
- High, Bright, Light and Clear: The Glory of Baroque Brass (RCA, 1983)
- Champions (CBS, 1983)
- A Canadian Brass Christmas (CBS, 1985)
- Live! (CBS, 1985)
- Brass & Bells at Christmas (Salvation Army, 1985)
- The Four Seasons (CBS, 1986)
- The Canadian Brass Plays George Gershwin (RCA Victor, 1987)
- Basin Street (FM, 1987)
- Pachelbel to Joplin (Vanguard, 1987)
- Art of the Fugue (CBS, 1988)
- The Mozart Album (CBS, 1988)
- Gabrieli/Monteverdi: Antiphonal Music (CBS, 1989)
- Brass in Berlin (CBS, 1984)
- The Christmas Album (Philips, 1990)
- English Renaissance Music (CBS, 1990)
- Red, White & Brass: Made in the USA (Philips, 1991)
- The Essential Canadian Brass (Philips, 1991)
- Red Hot Jazz: The Dixieland Album (Philips, 1993)
- Wagner for Brass (Philips, 1993)
- Rejoice! with Brass and Voice (Canticum Novum 1993)
- Gabrieli for Brass (Philips, 1994)
- Brass On Broadway (Philips, 1994)
- Noel (RCA Victor, 1994)
- Bolero and Other Classical Blockbusters (RCA Victor, 1995)
- Swingtime! (RCA Victor, 1995)
- Go for Baroque! (RCA Victor, 1995)
- Ragtime! (RCA Victor/BMG, 1995)
- Brass Busters! (RCA Victor/BMG, 1995)
- Brass Theater II (CORE, 1996)
- Plays Bernstein (RCA Victor, 1997)
- A Christmas Experiment (RCA Victor, 1997)
- All You Need Is Love (RCA Victor/BMG, 1998)
- Take the A Train (BMG, 1999)
- Goldberg Variations (RCA Victor, 2000)
- Amazing Brass (Opening Day, 2002)
- Sweet Songs of Christmas (Opening Day, 2002)
- Sacred Brass (BMG, 2002)
- A Holiday Tradition (True North, 2003)
- Magic Horn (Opening Day, 2004)
- Joyful Sounds – with organ and choir (Opening Day, 2005)
- Concert Band Essentials (Opening Day, 2007)
- Christmas Tradition (Opening Day, 2007)
- High Society (Opening Day, 2005)
- Wedding Essentials (Opening Day, 2006)
- People of Faith (Opening Day 2006) – with Elmer Iseler Singers
- Echo: Glory of Gabrieli (Opening Day , 2009)
- A Christmas Gloria (Mormon Tabernacle Choir 2007)
- Die Kunst Der Fuge (Sony, 2007)
- Jazz Roots (Opening Day 2008)
- Manhattan Music (Opening Day, 2008)
- Bach (Opening Day, 2008)
- Legends (Opening Day, 2008)
- Swing That Music – A Tribute to Louis Armstrong (Opening Day, 2010)
- Stars & Stripes: Canadian Brass Salute America (Opening Day 2010) with members of NEXUS
- A Very Merry Christmas (Opening Day, 2010) – with various artists
- Spirit Dance (Opening Day, 2010)
- The Classics: From Pachelbel to Purcell (Opening Day, 2011)
- The Classics: Between Bach & Handel (Opening Day, 2011)
- The Classics: Mozart & More (Opening Day, 2011)
- Brahms On Brass (Opening Day, 2011)
- Takes Flight (Opening Day, 2011)
- Schumann: Carnaval (Opening Day, 2013)
- Christmas Time Is Here: The Encore! (Opening Day, 2013)
- Great Wall of China (Opening Day, 2014)
- Perfect Landing (Opening Day, 2015)
- Canadiana (Linus, 2021)

== DVD/VHS/Laser discs ==
- Canadian Brass Live (1986)
- The Canadian Brass Masterclass (1989)
- The Canadian Brass Spectacular (1989)
- On Stage at Wolftrap (1990)
- Home Movies - Canadian Brass - An Innovative portrait ( 1991)
- Strings, Winds, and All That Brass (1992)
- The Canadian Brass Live in Germany (1994)
- Christmas Experiment (1998)
- A Christmas Gloria (1999)
- Bootleg Canadian Brass — Authorized Version (2002)
- Three Nights with Canadian Brass (2003)
- "Live from LPR New York" (2012)
- "The Couch Trip" Major Film Soundtrack (1998)
