= Hastings Sinfonia =

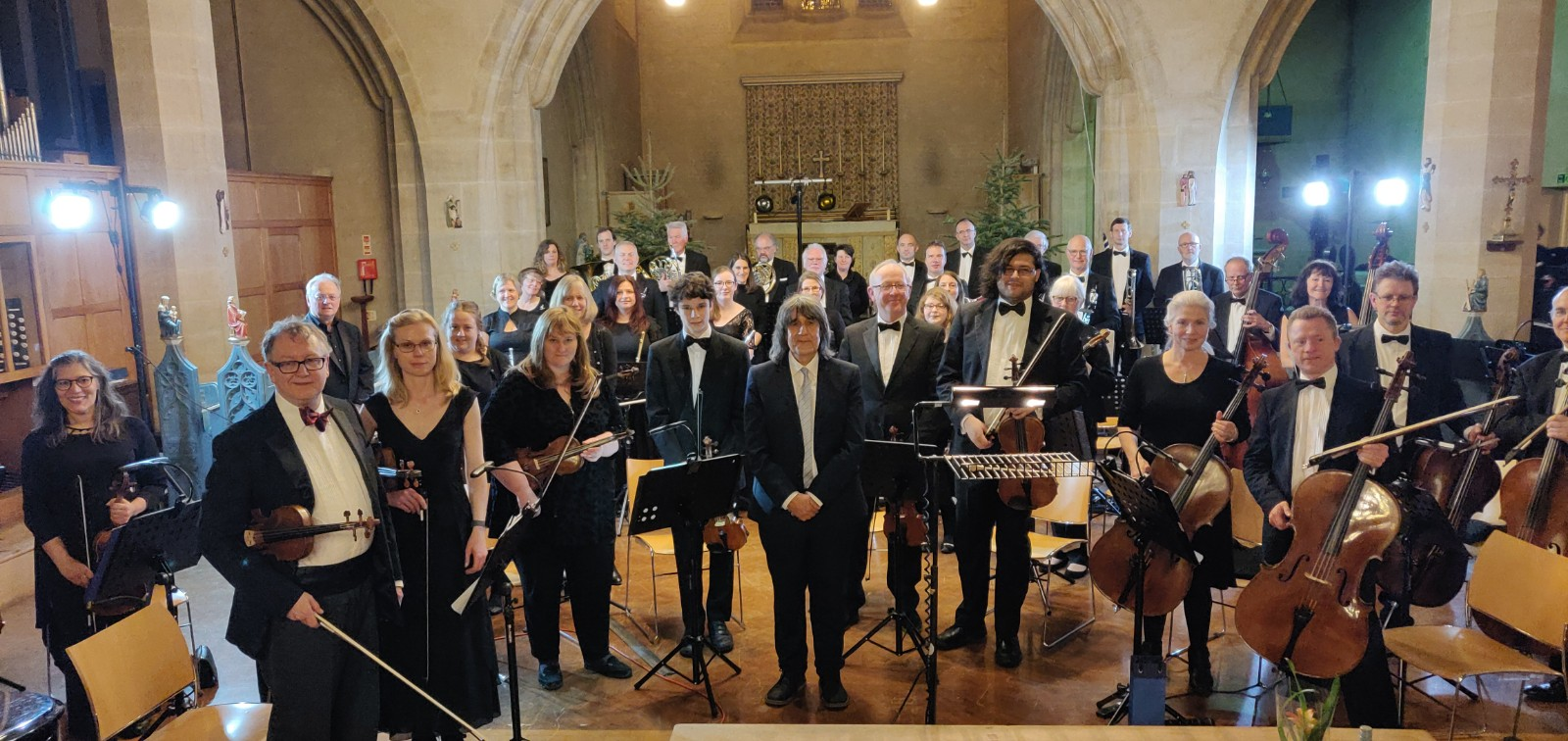
Hastings Sinfonia, 2019

The Hastings Sinfonia is an orchestra formed by local professional and talented musicians, based in Hastings, East Sussex, in the United Kingdom. The orchestra was founded in 2012 by British-Argentine composer and artistic director Polo Piatti, is conducted by Derek Carden and led by violinist Adrian Charlesworth.

The orchestra performs music including popular works, film and television music, opera highlights, and new works by living composers, including Paul Lewis, Gary Judd, Jonathan Bruce, Giulio Tampalini, Howard Southern, among others.

In addition to their main concerts, the orchestra has performed at various community events such as the Hastings Midsummer Fish Fest, Hastings Pirates Day was one of the orchestras that took part in The Battle of the Somme Centenary in 2017, performed with the London Mozart Players performing the premiere of Polo Piatti's Oratorio Libera Nos and performed for the Hastings Winkle Club's special 125th Anniversary Concert.
