= Vida Profunda =

Studio album by Carolina Calvache
- Released: 29 May 2020
- Studio: Samurai Hotel Recording Studio, Astoria, New York City
- Length: 42:07
- Label: Sunnyside
- Producer: Achilles Liarmakopoulos

Carolina Calvache chronology
Sotareño (2014)	Vida Profunda (2020)

Professional ratings
Review scores
Source	Rating
DownBeat	3/5 stars

Vida Profunda is the second studio album by Colombian pianist and composer Carolina Calvache, released on 29 May 2020 on Sunnyside Records. It features vocal performances by Rubén Blades, Claudia Acuña, Haydee Milanes, Aubrey Johnson, Marta Gómez, Sofia Ribeiro, Luba Mason, Lara Bello, and Sara Serpa.

== Track listing ==
No.	Title	Length
1.	"Vida Profunda" (featuring Marta Gómez)	5:12
2.	"Pájaro Yo" (featuring Sofia Ribeiro)	3:44
3.	"Te Conocí de Nuevo" (featuring Rubén Blades)	5:21
4.	"Sin un Despido" (featuring Claudia Acuña)	5:43
5.	"Hope" (featuring Sara Serpa)	3:44
6.	"Childhood Retreat" (featuring Aubrey Johnson)	3:55
7.	"Stella" (featuring Haydee Milanes)	4:06
8.	"El Rastro" (featuring Sara Serpa)	4:20
9.	"No Te Vi Crecer" (featuring Lara Bello)	3:46
10.	"Let Me Come with You" (featuring Luba Mason)	4:22
Total length:		42:07

== Personnel ==
- Carolina Calvache – piano
- Petros Klampanis – bass
- Ricky Rodgiruez – bass
- Peter Slavov – bass
- Keita Ogawa – percussion
- Jonathan Blake – drums
- Tomoko Omura – violin
- Leonor Falcon – violin
- Allysion Clare – viola
- Brian Sanders – cello
- Achilles Liarmakopoulos – trombone, producer
- Rubén Blades – vocals
- Marta Gómez – vocals
- Luba Mason – vocals
- Sofia Ribeiro – vocals
- Claudia Acuña – vocals
- Lara Bello – vocals
- Sara Serpa – vocals
- Haydee Milanes – vocals
- Ben Russell – violin
- Adda Kridler – violin
- Jocelin Pan – viola
- Diego Garcia – cello
- Samuel Torres – bongos
- Hadar Noiberg – flute
- Katie Scheele – oboe
- Paul Won Jin Cho – bass clarinet

Production

- David Darlington – mixing and mastering
- Achilles Liarmakopoulos – producer
- Engineers – David Stoller, Mor Mezrich
