= Maria Krushevskaya =

Russian harpist

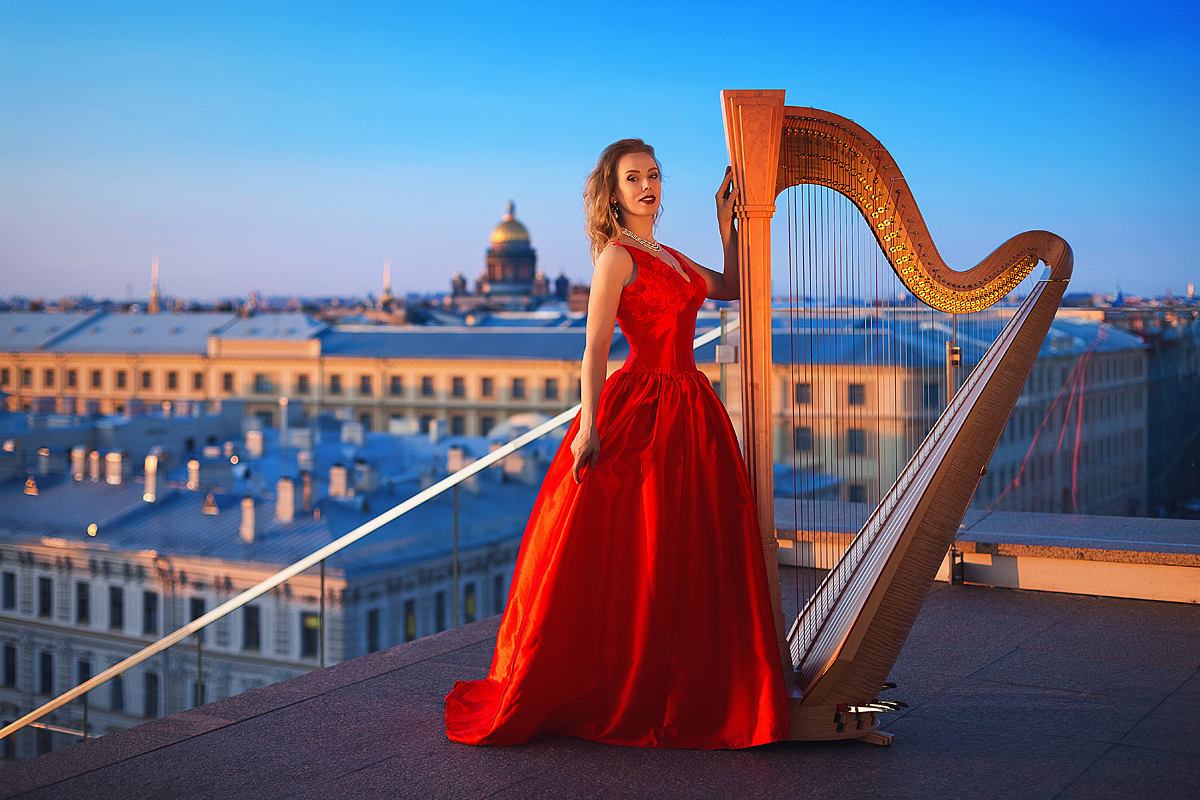
Maria Krushevskaya in St.-Petersburg on the roof of Mariinsky Theatre.

Maria Krushevskaya (born 1984) is a virtuoso Russian harpist. She was the gold medalist of the 2007 USA International Harp Competition, where she was awarded the Jan Jennings Prize for best performance of Pierné's Concertstück for Harp and Orchestra, the Mary L. Ogg Prize for best performance of Küne's Fantaisie sur un theme de l’opera Eugene Onegin, and best performance of Alvars' Introduction and Variations on Themes from Bellini's Opera Norma. Maria Krushevskaya was born in Moscow in 1984 in a family of musicians. She began to study music at the age of five. In 1992 she entered the Moscow Gnessin School of Music (class of Professor Milda Agazarian), graduating with distinction in 2002 and subsequently continued her studies at the Gnesins’ Russian Academy of Music from which she also graduated with distinction in 2008.

During her studies at the school and the academy she took part in and won prizes at All-Russian and international competitions including the Classical Legacy competition (1994, diploma), the I Russian Youth Harp Competition (Moscow, 1996, 1st prize), the IV International Martine Géliot Competition (France, 1999, 4th prize and Special Prize), the IV Lily Laskine Harp Competition (France, 2002, 2nd prize) and the 6th International Harp Competition (USA, Bloomington, 2004, 5th prize). In 2007 she took 1st prize and the Gold Medal as well as three special prizes at the 7th USA International Harp Competition (USA, Bloomington). Maria Krushevskaya is currently the only Russian to have won this competition. Her solo appearances include the Gargiles International Harp Festival in France, the World Harp Congress in Amsterdam (2008) and the International Harp Academy Harp Masters in Switzerland (2012). In the summer of 2012 she was invited to take part in the Crystal Key Xenia Erdeli International Harp Competition in St Petersburg as a jury member.

Maria Krushevskaya appears in recital at major international venues including Carnegie Hall (New York), the Queen Elizabeth Hall and the Royal Academy of Music in London, the Great Hall of the Moscow Conservatoire, the Mariinsky Theatre Concert Hall and the National Concert Hall of Taipei. The musician also frequently tours throughout France, the US, Hungary, Lithuania, Switzerland and Russia. In addition to her recital activities, Maria Krushevskaya has recorded two CDs (2006 and 2011) featuring works by Johann Sebastian Bach, Elias Parish Alvars, Albert Zabel, Jacques Charpentier, Joseph Jongen, Mikhail Glinka-Mily Balakirev, Carlos Salzedo, Frédéric Chopin and Domenico Scarlatti as well as the world's first-ever recording of a harp version of Wolfgang Amadeus Mozart's Piano Concerto No 12.

Maria Krushevskaya has been a grant-recipient from the Vladimir Spivakov International Charitable Foundation, the Russian Cultural Foundation's New Names programme and the Russian Performing Arts foundation; has produced recordings for radio and television. A short film was released in 2010 in the USA about the International Harp Competition in Bloomington, while August 2012 saw the release of the film "Creating Music. The Harp" by Kultura TV involving Krushevskaya.

From 2007 to 2013 Maria Krushevskaya was a soloist with the Bolshoi Theatre Orchestra; from 2013 to 2019 she was a soloist with the Mariinsky Theatre Orchestra; since December 2019 she is a principal harpist with the Bolshoi Theatre Orchestra

Maria Krushevskaya's official site: http://www.krushevskaya.com
