= Jeff Nelsen =

Canadian musician and instrumentalist

Jeff Nelsen (born December 11, 1969) is a Canadian French horn player. He is also a solo horn in the Canadian Brass and a professor of horn at the Jacobs School of Music at Indiana University in Bloomington, IN. He has performed in the Winnipeg Symphony Orchestra, Montreal Symphony, New York Philharmonic, Chicago Symphony Orchestra, Boston Symphony Orchestra, Cincinnati Symphony Orchestra, St. Louis Symphony Orchestra, National Symphony Orchestra, Rhode Island Philharmonic.

== Biography ==
Nelsen studied music at McGill University in Montreal. While at university, he won an audition for an orchestral spot, subsequently leaving school to take the position as fourth horn in the Winnipeg Symphony. The following year, he won an audition for fourth horn in the Montreal Symphony.

Nelsen has toured and recorded on and off for almost 20 years with Canadian Brass. He has performed recitals and concerti with orchestras in North and South America, Asia, Europe, and Australia. He was recruited to Indiana University's Jacobs School of Music, where he currently teaches.

Nelsen created a workshop called Fearless Performance, where he addresses common anxieties performing musicians face. Nelsen shared this seminar as part of a TEDx Talk. He has performed as a part of the orchestra for two Broadway shows (Chitty Chitty Bang Bang and "The Pirate Queen"), toured with Michael Bolton and Barry Manilow, and performed in the Balkan Gypsy funk band of Slavic Soul Party. Nelsen has joined the Academy of Magical Arts at the Magic Castle in Los Angeles.

== Discography selections ==
- Brahms Horn Trio: Op. 40 w/Mozart Horn Quintet, adapted for Horn Trio by Tony Rickard
  2010, Opening Day Records
- The Planets with Cincinnati Symphony Orchestra
  Cincinnati Symphony Orchestra
  Paavo Järvi, conductor
  2009, Telarc
- Pirate Queen, Original Broadway Cast Recording
  2007, Sony Classics
- Failure to Launch
  2006, Paramount Pictures
- Lucky Number Slevin
  2006, Capitol Films
- Stan Kenton Christmas Carols - Boston Brass and Friends
  2006, Summit Classical
- Stealth
  2003, Hal Leonard DVD
- Elizabeth Rex Soundtrack
  2003, Rhombus Media
- I Found Love
  Denzal Sinclaire
  2002, Blue Note Records
- Pitch Black
  2000, Interscope Communications Pictures
- The Bride of Chucky
  1998, Midwinter Productions, Inc.
- Air Bud
  1997, Walt Disney Pictures
- Berlioz Requiem
  Montréal Symphony Orchestra
  Charles Dutoit, conductor
  1995, London/Decca
- Bartók Concerto for Orchestra
  Montréal Symphony Orchestra
  Charles Dutoit, conductor
  1994, London/Decca DVD

Recordings with Canadian Brass

- Stars and Stripes- Canadian Brass Salute America
  2010, Opening Day Records
- Echo; Glory of Gabrieli
  2009, Opening Day Records
- Swing That Music
  2009, Opening Day Records
- Legends
  2008, Opening Day Records
- Bach
  2008, Opening Day Records
- High Society
  2007, Opening Day Records
- Christmas Tradition
  2007, Opening Day Records
- And So It Goes, Giles Tomkins
  2006, Opening Day Records
- Magic Horn
  2004, Opening Day Records
- Amazing Brass
  2002, Opening Day Records
- Holidays with Canadian Brass
  2000, Opening Day Records
