= Andrew Cadima =

American composer and painter

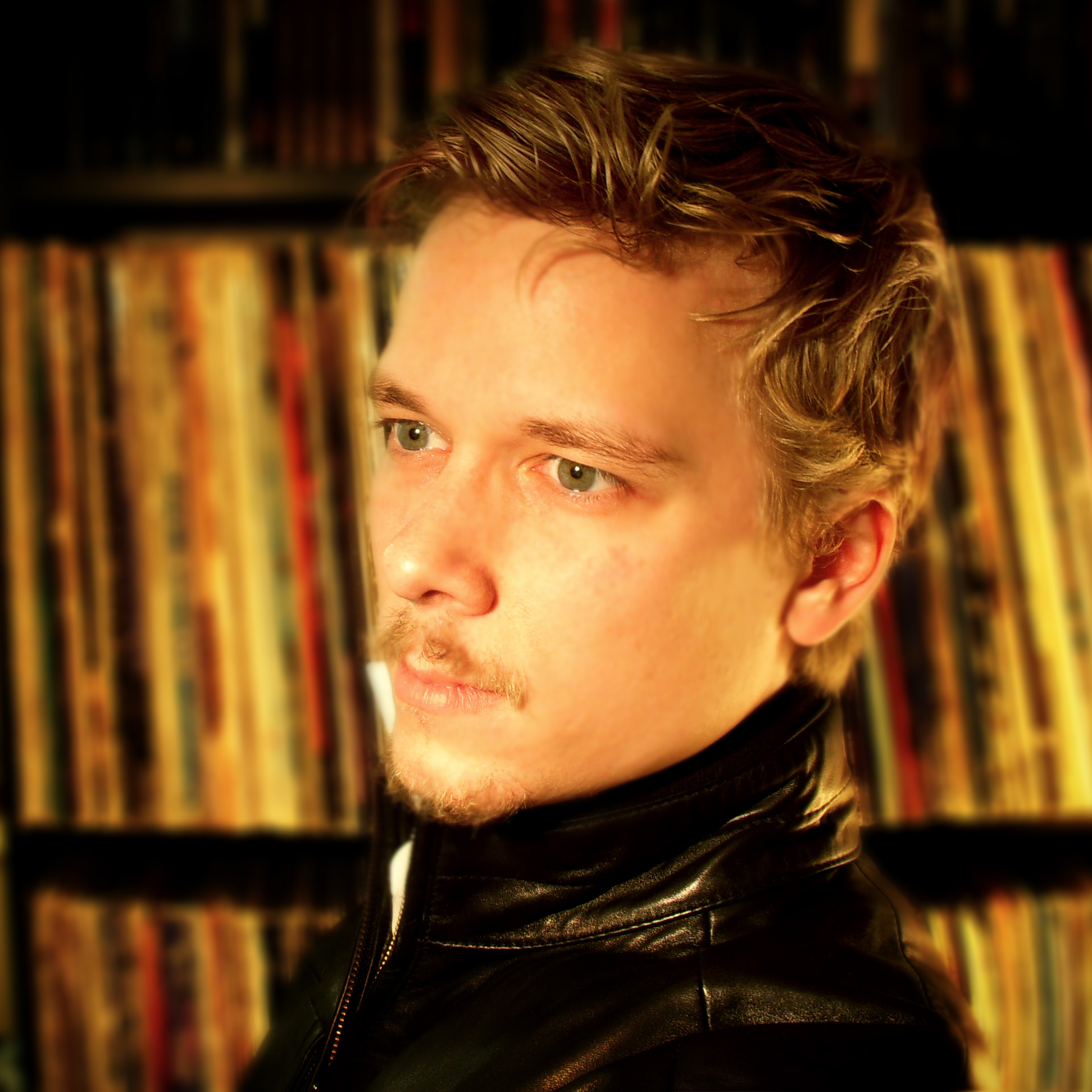
- Andrew Cadima

Background information
- Born: Andrew William Cadima; October 8, 1984 (age 41)
- Origin: Raleigh, North Carolina
- Genres: Classical
- Occupations: Composer, painter
- Website: www.andrewcadima.com

Andrew William Cadima (born October 8, 1984) is an American composer and painter.

== Biography ==
Cadima is currently residing in the San Francisco Bay Area. He has written for a wide variety of instruments and ensembles ranging from solo harp to large orchestra and for events and venues ranging from rock concerts to symphony halls.

Cadima began his studies in composition in Austin, Texas, with Joe Harchanko at the University of Texas at Austin. Subsequently, he received B.M. and M.M. degrees in composition from the San Francisco Conservatory of Music, studying under Dan Becker and David Garner. During his studies at the San Francisco Conservatory, Cadima was the recipient of the Agnes Albert Scholarship. He has also studied abroad and performed on the piano, guitar, and violin in cities including Vienna, Paris, and Valencia, Spain.

Cadima's music has been performed both locally and internationally by many soloists and ensembles including members of the San Francisco Symphony and Philadelphia Orchestra, The Curtis Institute of Music Chamber Orchestra, the San Francisco Conservatory of Music Orchestra, the SFCM New Music Ensemble (Nicole Paiement, director), the SFCM Chorus, the Huntington Guitar Ensemble, the Allendale String Quartet, and award-winning trombonist Achilles Liarmakopoulos, among many others.

His music has also been featured at many institutions including the Yale School of Music, the Curtis Institute of Music, the Aspen Music Festival, Colorado State University.

== Notable works ==
- Dream for trombone solo, string orchestra, and harp, commissioned by trombone virtuoso Achilles Liarmakopoulos, was given its east coast premiere in May 2008 by the Curtis Institute of Music. Dream was previously premiered on the west coast in 2007 by the AC/SF Chamber Orchestra under Jacques Dejardins.
- Miserere for mixed (SATB) chorus was given its premiere by the SFCM Chorus at the San Francisco Conservatory of Music Choral Composition Competition in May 2008 where it was a prize winner.
- Distance for solo trombone and trombone choir - commissioned by trombonist of the Canadian Brass, Achilles Liarmakopoulos The premiere took place at the University of Oklahoma with the University of Oklahoma Trombone Choir under the direction of Irvin Wagner. The piece was recorded in 2019 and was released in 2020.

== Affiliations ==
Andrew Cadima is a member of ASCAP, the American Composer's Forum, and the American Music Center.
