= Trombone Atrevido =

Trombone Atrevido is the third solo album by trombonist Achilles Liarmakopoulos released in 2015 by ODEG label. It's dedicated to choro music of Brazil.

== Musicians ==
- Achilles Liarmakopoulos: trombone
- Spiros Exaras: guitar
- Vitor Goncalvez: accordion
- Bam Bam Rodriguez: bass
- Helio Alves: piano
- Rogerio Boccato: pandeiro
- Felipe Fournier: vibes

== Production ==
- Producer: Spiros Exaras
- Executive Producer: Achilles Liarmakopoulos
- Engineer: Lou Scapino
- Mixing: Dixon Van Winkle
- Mastering: Bernie Grundman

== Track listing ==
1. "Trombone Atrevido" - Pixinguinha
2. "Choinho do sol" - Spiros Exaras
3. "Andre de sapato novo" - Andre Victor Correa
4. "Desprezado" - Pixinguinha
5. "Amor e medo - Zequinha Abreu
6. "Chorei" - Pixinguinha & Benedito Lacerda
7. "Cavaquinho Seresteiro" - Waldir Azevedo
8. "Choro N.1 (Choro Tipico)" - Heitor Villa-Lobos
9. "Ave Maria" - Erotides de Campos
10. "Canto em rodeio" - Pixinguinha
11. "Cordas Romanticas" - Waldir Azevedo
12. "Chora Trombone" - Jose Da Silva
13. "Ternura" - K-Ximbinho
