= Meridian Arts Ensemble =

American chamber music ensemble

- Origin: New York City, New York, U.S.
- Genres: Chamber music
- Years active: 1987–present
- Members: Matthew Onstad; Faustino Diaz; Daniel Grabois; Benjamin Herrington; Tom Curry; John Ferrari
- Website: www.meridianartsensemble.com

The Meridian Arts Ensemble is an American chamber music ensemble based in New York City, specializing in the performance of new works for brass and percussion.

== History ==
The Meridian Arts Ensemble was founded in 1987. The original members of the group wanted an opportunity to play challenging works, to experience control of their ensemble, and to find creative outlets for their musicianship. Meridian received its early education in the American Brass Quintet's brass class at the Juilliard School, and then launched its professional career. The ensemble has played all over the country and the world. Ensemble members currently serve as faculty members in many prestigious US universities.

== Awards and albums ==
In the late 1980s, the group won a string of four competitions: Artists International, Chamber Music Chicago, New York Brass Conference, and finally, in 1990, Concert Artists Guild. The prize for the latter was extremely important to the ensemble - not just the cachet of winning, and not just the prize money, but management by Concert Artists Guild's booking department, a commission from a composer of the ensemble's choice (Stephen Barber's work Semahane, for brass quintet, percussion, and piano), and a recording for Channel Classics Records. In 1990, Meridian traveled to the Netherlands to record its first compact disc, part of Channel's Winning Artists Series. That CD contained works by Alvin Etler, Taxin, Alexander Arutiunian, Jan Bach, and Paul Hindemith, and was released in 1991.

The group's second CD was released in 1992. Entitled Smart Went Crazy (from a poem by Allen Ginsberg), this disc established Meridian's reputation as an innovator in the field of brass chamber music and new music in general. There was substantial interest in this disc, leading to an interview with the group on NPR's Weekend Edition program. Brisk sales of the disc helped to cement Meridian's relationship with its recording label. Seven more discs have now been released, all to critical acclaim. The most recent albums on Channel Classics, Brink (released in 2006), and Timbrando (released in 2008) were recorded in the Super Audio CD (SACD) format. Since 2009, the group has released a number of new CD recordings and one live concert DVD. See "Discography" for a complete listing.

== Tours ==
In the years since 1987, Meridian has performed in every state of the U.S. except Hawaii, as well as in the Netherlands, Belgium, Romania, Germany, Finland, Taiwan, Japan, Cuba, Dominican Republic, Costa Rica, Brazil, Mexico, and Colombia. The group has commissioned over fifty new pieces, tours extensively, and was for a number of years on the faculty of Manhattan School of Music's Contemporary Performance degree program.

== Personnel ==
The current membership of the ensemble is:

Trumpets: Matthew Onstad and Faustino Diaz Horn: Daniel Grabois Trombone: Benjamin Herrington Tuba: Tom Curry Percussion: John Ferrari

=== Past members ===
The trumpet chair originally occupied by Rolf Holly quickly went to Richard Kelley, who appears on Meridian's first three CDs. Following Mr. Kelley's departure, a string of trumpeters performed with the group: Alex Holton, Darryl Shaw, Kevin Cobb, Wayne DuMaine, and Terry Szor. After a national audition, Josef Burgstaller joined and performed with the group for six years before joining the Canadian Brass. Brian McWhorter joined in 2001 and departed in 2010 to focus on other projects including Beta Collide and Orchestra Next. Tim Leopold, a NYC freelance artist joined immediately after, and left the group in 2019 and replaced Sycil Mathai. In 2023, Meridian welcomed Matthew Onstad to the group.

Trumpeter Jon Nelson is a founding member of the group. His one-year sabbatical was filled by Charles Lazarus, who is now a member of the Minnesota Orchestra. Jon retired from MAE in 2024 and Faustino Diaz, MAE's previous trombone player, now sits in the other trumpet chair!

Hornist Daniel Grabois came to the ensemble in 1989, following a string of horn players. Tracy Leonard was the original hornist, followed by Lisa Aplikowski, Peter Reit, and Chris Komer. Mr. Grabois' six-month sabbatical was filled by Ann Ellsworth.

Trombonist Benjamin Herrington was a founding member of the group. He retired in 2019 and was replaced by Faustino Diaz. Benjamin Herrington came out of retirement and rejoined the group in 2024.

Tubist Raymond Stewart was a founding member. His half-year sabbatical was filled by Marcus Rojas. Raymond retired and was replaced by current member Tom Curry.

Percussion: the group was founded without a percussionist. The first drummer to play with the ensemble was Mo Roberts, who appears on the Smart Went Crazy CD. John Ferrari took over shortly thereafter, and has been with the group since.

== Instrumentation ==
- 2 trumpets
- French horn
- Trombone
- Tuba
- Percussion

== Discography ==
- Winning Artists Series (Renamed and re-released 2011 as GO)
- Smart Went Crazy
- Visions of the Renaissance
- Prime Meridian
- Five
- Anxiety of Influence
- Ear Mind I
- Brink
- Americantus: The Music of Britton Theurer
- Timbrando
- Alchemy
- Seven Kings
- In the Zone: Music of Andrew Rindfleisch
- Live Concert DVD

== Works commissioned by or for the Meridian Arts Ensemble (selective list) ==
- Albert Ahlstrom - Treelight (brass quintet)
- Peter Alexander - Ferraphunx (brass quintet and percussion)
- Mark Applebaum - Magnetic North (brass quintet, percussion, optional mouseketier)
- Milton Babbitt - Counterparts (brass quintet)
- Milton Babbitt - Fanfare for Nothing (brass quintet and percussion)
- Stephen Barber - Multiples Points on View of a Fanfare (brass quintet)
- Stephen Barber - Semahane (brass quintet, percussion, piano)
- Stephen Barber - Gone Is the River (brass quintet)
- Daniel Becker - Droned (brass quintet and percussion)
- Kim Bowman - Brass Quintet and Percussion (brass quintet and percussion)
- Josef Burgstaller - Dr. J. Geyser (brass quintet and percussion)
- Josef Burgstaller - Lullaby (brass quintet and percussion)
- Nick Didkovsky - Slim in Beaten Dreamers (brass quintet and percussion)
- John Ferrari - Baqrz Duzn (brass quintet and percussion)
- John Ferrari - Crunch (brass quintet and percussion)
- John Ferrari - MAE We Strut (brass quintet and percussion)
- Jason Forsythe - Sanctity (brass quintet)
- Gerardo Gandini - Subtangos (brass quintet and piano)
- Daniel Grabois - Migration (brass quintet and percussion)
- Daniel Grabois - Zen Monkey (brass quintet)
- John Halle - Softshoe (brass quintet)
- John Halle - By All Means (brass quintet and percussion)
- Edward Harsh - American Optimism (brass quintet and percussion)
- Melissa Hui - Bebop (brass quintet and percussion)
- Edward Jacobs - Passed Time (brass quintet)
- Phillip Johnston - Sleeping Beauty (brass quintet)
- Ana Lara - En Par de la Levante de l'Aurora (brass quintet and percussion)
- Tania Leon - Saoko (brass quintet)
- Robert Maggio - Revolver (brass quintet and percussion)
- Gustavo Matamoros - Trump(s) Card(s) (brass quintet and percussion and midi trigger)
- Marc Mellits - Groove Canon (brass quintet and percussion)
- Jon Nelson - Dream of Miles (brass quintet and percussion)
- Jon Nelson - Fanfare for Nothing (brass quintet and percussion)
- Jon Nelson - Paterson 2:35 (brass quintet and percussion)
- Jon Nelson - Sleepless (brass quintet and percussion)
- Kirk Nurock - Smart Went Crazy (brass quintet and percussion)
- Hermeto Pascoal - Timbrando (brass quintet and vibraphone)
- Tom Pierson - Brass Quintet (brass quintet)
- Belinda Reynolds - Weave (brass quintet)
- Peter Robles - Transcendent Tones, Fractured Forms (brass quintet)
- Jolie Roelofs - Lock the Door Before You Open It (brass quintet and percussion)
- David Sanford - Corpus (brass quintet and percussion)
- Elliott Sharp - Beyond the Curve (brass quintet and percussion)
- Raymond Stewart - KOHS-ska (brass quintet and percussion)
- Raymond Stewart - OK Chorale (brass quintet)
- Su Lian Tan - Mu Shoo Wrap Rap (brass quintet and percussion)
- Randy Woolf - Eucalyptus (brass quintet and percussion)
- Norman Yamada - Mundane Dissatisfactions (brass quintet)
- Carolyn Yarnell - Slade (brass quintet)
