= Elisabeth Fontan-Binoche =

French harp teacher (1926–2026)

Elisabeth Fontan‑Binoche (26 May 1926 – 9 October 2026) was a French harpist and harp teacher. She was the aunt of French actress Juliette Binoche.

== Early life and education ==
Fontan‑Binoche was one of the last pupils of Marcel Tournier. Born on 26 May 1926, she started studying with him at 6 years old at the Paris Conservatoire, where he taught until 1948.

She won 4th prize in the first edition of the Israel Harp Competition in 1959, earning a major international reputation early in her career.

== Performing career ==
Fontan‑Binoche gave recitals across Europe, the United States, Canada, South America, Japan, Tunisia, and New Caledonia and performed on stage until a later age, including a recital in Italy at 87 years old in 2014.

A live recording of her Kyoto recital won the National Award in Japan in 2006.

In addition to her solo and chamber music career, she held the position of Principal Harp at the Orchestre Philharmonique de Nice.

She sat on the jury of major international harp competitions, such as the USA International Harp Competition and the French Harp Contest (Concours Français de la Harpe).

== Teaching career ==
A renowned pedagogue, Fontan‑Binoche taught harp at the Conservatoire de Boulogne, at the Conservatoire National Supérieur de Musique in Lyon and the Conservatoire de Nice, before relocating to the Conservatoire of Antibes towards the end of her career.

Fontan-Binoche also regularly gave master classes around the world, including in Italy, Japan, and the U.S.A. (such as at the Curtis Institute of Music in Philadelphia).

Notable students include Marie-Pierre Langlamet, Isabelle Perrin, Rossitza Milevska, Alexander Boldachev, Maia Darmé, Merisha Shukri, Sandrine Luzignant.

== Later life and death ==
Fontan-Binoche later lived in Côte-d’Azur. She died there on 9 October 2026, at the age of 100.

== Recordings ==
- Elisabeth Fontan-Binoche plays the Music of Marcel Tournier, produced by Egan Records.
- Harp Recital in Kyoto, produced by La Maggiore Edizioni Discografiche, 2003.
- Concert à Quatre, with the Harpe Riviera Quatuor, 2007.
- Trio Elisa, with Sandrine Luzignant (harp) and Philipee Monville (violin).
- Flute et Harpe : Duo flûte et harpe de Paris, with Jacques Castagner (flute), produced by Disques Adès.
- Three Romantic Sonatas for Flute and Harp by Nadermann, Krumpholz and Bochsa Fils, with Jacques Castagner (flute), produced by Société Française de Production Phonographique, Paris.
