= Spiros Exaras =

Greek musician

Spiros Exaras is a Greek guitarist, composer, producer and arranger.

== Career ==
He has performed and recorded with Mariah Carey Shirley Bassey Mark Murphy Gerardo Velez, Philip Hamilton, Charles Blenzig, Mike Pope, Andy Middleton, Randy Brecker, Joel Rosenblatt, Jon Benitez, Tessa Souter, Dave Valentin, Arturo O'Farrill Evanthia Reboutsika, Mario Frangoulis, Kostas Hatzis, Elias Andriopoulos, Alkistis Protopsalti, Yannis Markopoulos, Kostas Karalis, Antonis Kaloyannis, Tom Schuman, Mark Egan, Tom 'Bones' Malone, George Dalaras, Manto, Petros Gaitanos, Alexia, Doros Dimosthenous, George Andreou, Elli Paspala, Kamerata Orchestra, Orchestra of Colors, Greek National Radio & Television Orchestra among others.

== Albums ==
- Spiros Exaras plays Kostas Hatzis - (MBI Records) 1992
- Everything For A Reason (Original Motion Picture Soundtrack) - (Polyglottal Music) 2000
- Niko's Restaurant (Original Motion Picture Soundtrack) - (Polyglottal Music) 2001
- Gallathea (Original Theatre Soundtrack) - )Polyglottal Music) 2002
- Phrygianics --- Spiros Exaras World Jazz Ensemble - (Blue Note Records) 2003
- Old Waters New River — Spiros Exaras/Ellio Villafranca - (Harbinger Records) 2014
- Just Cause (Original Motion Picture Soundtrack) - (Polyglottal Music) 2014
- Mark Murphy feat Spiros Exaras : Live in Athens, Greece - (Harbinger Records) 2016
- Stis Paralies Tou Feggariou --- Spiros Exaras/Iakovos Kambanellis/Lina Orfanou- (MLK) 2016
- Anatomia Enos Eglimatos - Spiros Exaras/Fondas Ladis - (Metronomos 2023)

== EPs ==
- Unbounded Blue (feat Randy Brecker, Mark Egan, Tom Schuman, Joel Rosenblatt, Don Harris, Tom "Bones" Malone, Alex Blake, Bill Harris, Gerardo Velez) - (Polyglottal Music 1994)
- The Dwarf Planets with Achilles Liarmakopoulos on trombone - (Spiros Exaras Music 2020)
- The Magic of Christmas, feat. Eugene Ruffolo and Amanda Homi (Polyglottal Music 2021)

== Singles ==
- I Will Never Forget - Achilles Liarmakopoulos, Spiros Exaras - (AL Music, Polyglottal Music 2019)
- La Ruta (featuring Nancy Ticotin) - (Polyglottal Music 2020)
- Yanni mou to Mandili sou/Take 5 - Loukia Valasi/Spiros Exaras (Apollon Productions/Polyglottal Music 2021)
- Christmas Fantasy - Achilles Liarmakopoulos, Spiros Exaras (AL Music 2021)
- This is for U (feat. Georgia Lazaridou) - (Polyglottal 2022)
- Take Five (Live) - Spiros Exaras/Costas Baltazanis - (Polyglottal 2022)
- The Three Secrets of Rain - Spiros Exaras/Achilles Liarmakopoulos/ Georgia Lazaridou - (Polyglottal 2023)
- Unbounded Blue - Spiros Exaras World Jazz Ensemble (Polyglottal Music 2024)
- Dance of the Tears with Achilles Liarmakopoulos on trombone and Theodor Milkov on marimba (Polyglottal Music 2025)

== Other Discography ==
Sources:

- George Mouzakis, Lakis Lazopoulos : Eho Apopse Rendez-Vous (Sony Greece 1992) - (guitarist)
- John Modinos : Our Roots (Alfa Mi 1993) - (guitarist)
- Thomas Bakalakos : Ap'Tin Ellada Ya Hara (Alpha Mi Records 1993) - (guitarist)
- Mariah Carey : My All & Breakdown (Sony Music 1998) - (guitarist)
- Man-Yee Lam : Awakened to a Dream (Starlight Music 2000) - (guitarist)
- Aris Tomas : Wild World (Wizard Records 2003) - (guitarist, producer)
- Philip Hamilton: Blues, Rhythm, Rhythm & Blues (Montenegro Records 2003) - (guitarist)
- Ensemble Elektra : Afrodite's Smile (Milo Records 2004) - (guitarist)
- Christie : Who Needs Love (Christie Productions 2005) - (guitarist)
- Richard Khuzami : Fused (Dahdoo Records 2006) - (guitarist)
- Lina Orfanos : Enchanted Night (Romanos Productions 2007) - (guitarist, producer, arranger)
- Mitch Zorba : Zorba (Young Pals Music 2009) - (guitarist, co-writer, co-producer)
- Emre Yilmaz : Kaderin Yerine (Yasar Kekeva Plakcılık 2011) - (guitarist, arranger producer)
- Argyro Kaparou : Xeirolaves (R-Time 2012) - (guitarist)
- Angeliki : Middle Earth Sea (Angel Bee Productions 2013) - (guitarist, arranger, producer)
- Dimitris Maramis-Lina Orfanos : Ay Amor (Romanos Productions 2013) - (guitarist)
- Amanda Homi : Till I Reach Bombay (Drumgirl 2013) - (guitarist, arranger)
- Tasso Zapanti : Reflections Upon (Zapanti Music 2014) - (guitarist)
- Lina Orfanos : Mathausen/Desserters (Babinis Productions 2015) - (guitarist, arranger, producer)
- Achilles Liarmakopoulos : Trombone Atrevido (ODEG 2015), (guitarist, arranger, composer, producer)
- Νικοs Platyrachos/George Dalaras : Ta Astega (Feelgood Records 2015) - (guitar)
- Lina Orfanos : Essentially Ella (Babinis Productions 2016) - (guitarist, arranger, producer)
- Doros Dimosthenous : Compere (Purple Lily Records 2016) - (guitarist)
- Achilles Liarmakopoulos : Ethereal - (AL 2017) - (guitarist, composer, arranger, producer)
- Nikos Platyrachos/Dimitris Lentzos : Mavri Mpogia sto Marmaro (MLK 2018) - (guitarist)
- Korina Legaki, George Andreou, Nikos Xydakis : Neos Kosmos (Mikri Arktos 2019) - (guitarist)
- Lina Orfanos : Dream (Bambinis Productions, 2019) - (composer, guitarist, arranger, producer)
- Samo Salamon : Almost Alone, Vol 1 (Samo Salamon 2020) - (featured guitarist)
- Lina Orfanos - Love Matters (Bambinis/Romanos Productions, 2021) - (guitarist, arranger, producer)
- Aggeliki: Samba Griega (Rtime, Polyglottal Music 2021) - (arranger, producer, guitarist)
- Vaggelis Tzitzis : Apostalagmata (Metronomos 2022) - (guitarist)
- Lina Orfanos : Ta Lyrika (Metronomos 2024) - (guitarist, mandolin player, arranger, producer)
- Demetrios Kastaris & Latin Jazz Coalition : El Griego Rumbero (LJC Records/PDDS 2026), (featured guitarist, arranger, producer)
- Despina : Blue Garden (Polyglottal Music 2026) (arranger, producer, guitarist, mandolin player

== Featured in Compilations ==
- ROW : Rivers of the World (ROW - 2001) - (guitarist)
- KOSMOS 93.6 : Ethnic Collection (Universal Music/MINOS 2005) -(composer, arranger, guitarist, producer)
- Various Artists (Lyra- 2008) - (guitarist, arranger)

== Music for Film and Theater ==
- Everything for a reason- 2000 - directed by Vlas Parlapanides, written by Vlas and Charles Parlapanides, executive producer Larry Meistrich
- Niko's restaurant - 2001(short) -written by Evan Camfield and Efterpi Charalambidis, directed by Efterpi Charalambidis
- Just Cause - 2014(short) -written and directed by Paul Krisikos
- Gallathea (play) (2002)

== Awards ==
- Bronze medal at Global Music Awards for the song 'Dance o the Tears', in the categories of Contemporary/Classical and Composition/Composer
- Nomination at the World Entertainment Awards for the song 'Dance o the Tears', in the category of 'Best Jazz Solo Performance
- Winner of Intercontinental Music Awards for the song "La Ruta" in the category of 'Best Latin Jazz'.
- Nomination of Intercontinental Music Awards for the song "The Magic of Christmas" in the category of 'Best Jazz'
- Recognition from the Recording Academy of his participation as a musician on Mariah Carey's Grammy Winning Recording "My All", remixed by David Morales (41st Grammy Awards® Year 1998)
