= Carolina Calvache =

Colombian jazz pianist, arranger and composer

Carolina Calvache is a jazz pianist, arranger and composer from Colombia.

== Career ==
Calvache was born in Cali, Colombia in 1985.

Her debut album Sotareno was released by Sunnyside Records in 2014. Later in the year, she performed at the first Women in Latin Jazz Festival in New York. In 2015, she taught piano and performed in Chennai, India.

She holds degrees from Universidad de Valle and the University of North Texas.

Her piece "Trombonsillo" and "Ethereal" for trombone and piano were recorded by Achilles Liarmakopoulos on his album Ethereal in 2017. Trombonsillo has been performed all over Europe, North & South America and Asia.

In 2020 she released her second album "Vida Profunda". In this dynamic new release, Calvache explored meaningful poetry by world-renowned poets, augmenting the text with her stunning compositions, lush instrumentation and striking vocal performances by Ruben Blades, Claudia Acuña, Haydee Milanes, Aubrey Johnson, Marta Gomez, Sofia Ribeiro, Luba Mason, Lara Bello, and Sara Serpa.

== Discography ==
- Sotareño (2014) - on Sunnyside Records
- Vida Profunda(2020) - on Sunnyside Records
- La Ultima Vez, with Camila Meza (2016)
- Oportunidad - with Achilles Liarmakopoulos (2022)
- Volverme a encontrar - with Juana Luna (2023)

Appear on the following Discography

- Ethereal - Achilles Liarmakopoulos (2017)
- Transitions (single) - Achilles Liarmakopoulos & Andreas Rolandos Theodorou (2019)
- Tramontana - Juan Andres Ospina (2018)
- Daybrake - Vicenzo Paratore (2020)
- Latin American Portraits- Jaime Morales (2021)
- The voices and bridges - Ehsan Matoori (2021)
- La Luna - Andres 123 (2021)

== Commissions ==
- Trombonsillo (2016) - Trombone and piano - Dedicated to Achilles Liarmakopoulos
- Transitions (2017) - Commissioned by "Make More Noise: Evan Conroy and Chris Van Hof, and the Music City Trombone Duo: Brian Entwistle and Jeremy Wilson"
- Encuentros (2018) - Bass Trombone and piano - Dedicated to Sebastian Cifuentes
- Sunrise Suite (2019) - Tuba and piano - Dedicated to Ricardo Carvalhoso
- Kava (2019) - Trumpet and piano - Dedicated Juan Fernando Avendaño
- Caminos (2020) - Trombone and piano - Dedicated to Shachar Israel
- Latin American Street Scenes (2020)- Dedicated to Don Lucas
- Four Generations - Art Song for piano and soprano- Dedicated to Takesha Meshé Kizart-Thomas, commissioned by Anima Mundi Productions. 2021
