= Joe Burgstaller =

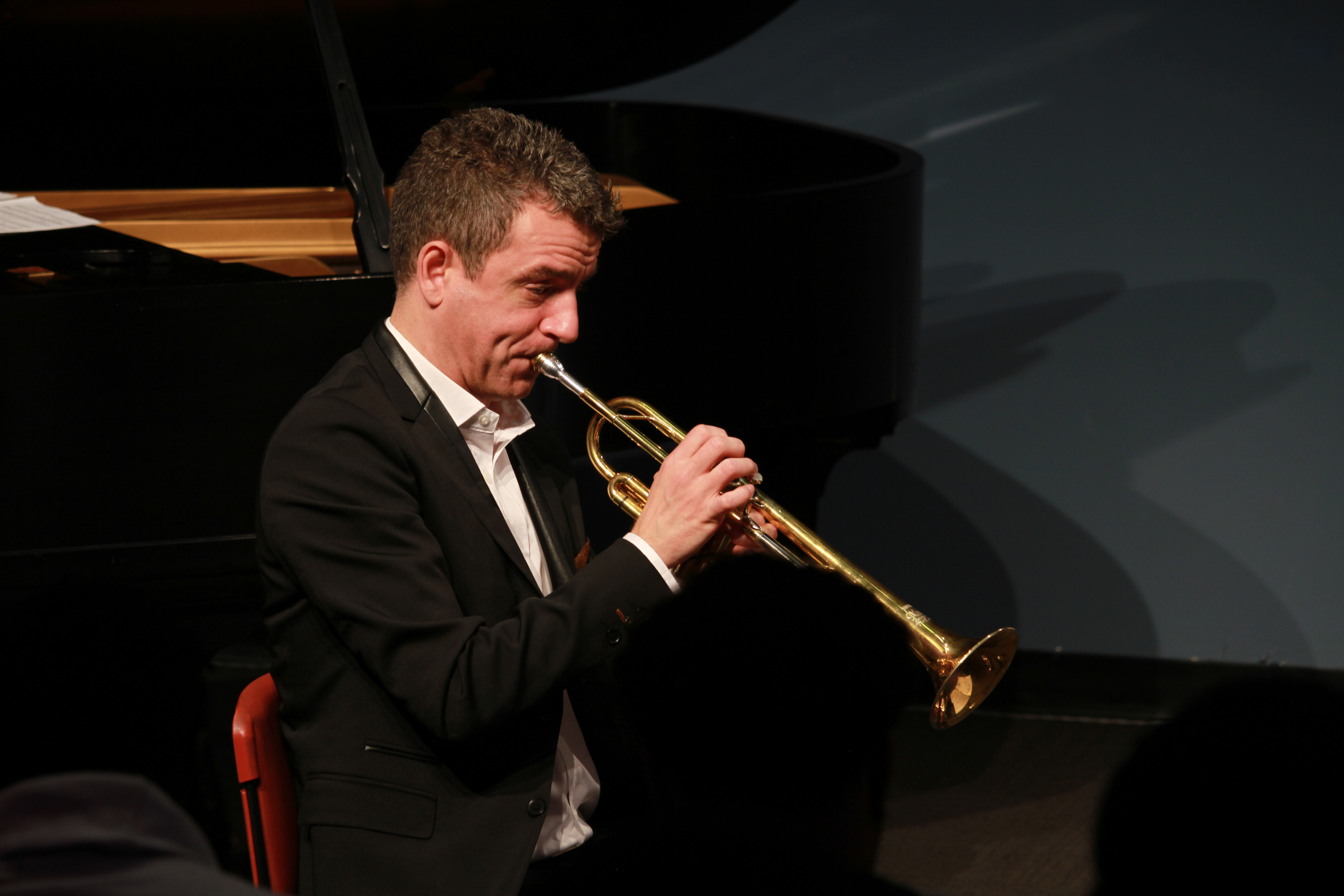

Background information
- Genres: Classical; Jazz
- Instrument: Trumpet
- Formerly of: Canadian Brass
- Website: www.joeburgstaller.com

Josef Burgstaller is an American trumpet player, teacher, and arranger. Conductor JoAnn Falletta called him "quite simply, a superstar of the trumpet". He was a member of Canadian Brass for nearly eight years, and continues to tour worldwide as a soloist. Burgstaller returned to the Canadian Brass in June 2023.

== Biography ==
Burgstaller was born in Chicago Illinois. He was a child prodigy beginning the cornet at age six. By age twelve, he was soloing with area bands and playing in jazz clubs, and by age fifteen, he was the youngest professional in the Virginia Opera orchestra. He studied at Arizona State University where he received both his bachelor's and master's degrees. After college, he became a member of the Meridian Arts Ensemble which he performed with for six years. By 2001 he had become one of The United States' busiest trumpet soloists, performing over 50 concerts each season. In 2001 he joined Canadian Brass and was a member until 2004 and again from 2006 to 2009. Three Canadian Brass albums featuring Burgstaller became top 10 Billboard hits. He is a founding member of the New York Brass Arts Trio along with David Jolley and Haim Avitsur. He is currently the associate professor of Trumpet at Arizona State University.

He has performed in front of over 45 orchestras, in over 50 music festivals, and has taught at over 120 universities. He is a Yamaha Performing Artist.

== Discography ==
Burgstaller has released two solo albums: The Virtuoso Trumpet (2000) and License to Thrill (2013). He has released two albums with Grammy nominated pianist Hector Martignon, and was a part of multiple Canadian Brass and Meridian Arts Ensemble albums. Burgstaller has released two albums with the New York Brass Arts Trio: Feats of Brass and Till Eulenspiegel.
