= Skaila Kanga =

Harpist

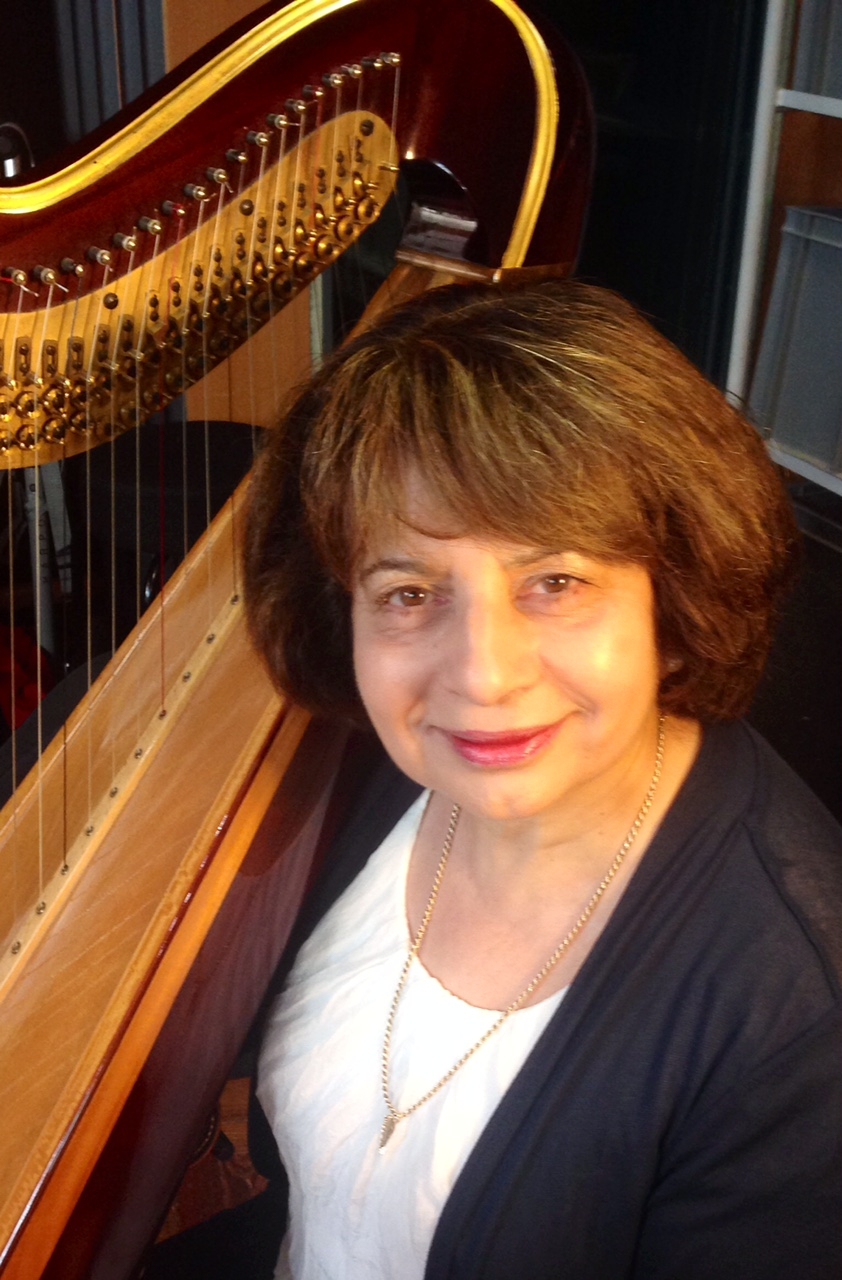
Skaila Kanga

Skaila Kanga (born in India) is a harpist and Professor Emerita of Harp at the Royal Academy of Music in London. After winning a Junior Exhibition to the Royal Academy of Music for piano, she switched to harp studies at age 17. She studied with Tina Bonifacio, Sir Thomas Beecham's harpist in the Royal Philharmonic Orchestra.

== Early career ==
Skaila began with the BBC Concert Orchestra, after which she went on to freelance with many London orchestras under such conductors as André Previn, Sir Georg Solti, Otto Klemperer, Evgeny Svetlanov, Simon Rattle, Sir Adrian Boult, Rudolf Kempe, Carlo Maria Giulini, Pierre Monteux, Bernard Haitink, Lorin Maazel, Zubin Mehta, Pierre Boulez and Daniel Barenboim.

== Solo career ==
Skaila's solo career has included many performances of concertos and broadcasts in the realms of records, films and television. She has worked for musical artists such as John Williams, Jerry Goldsmith, Michel Legrand, James Horner, Pat Metheny, Michael Nyman, Frank Sinatra, Barbra Streisand, Elton John, Luciano Pavarotti, Joan Sutherland, Plácido Domingo, José Carreras, Barbara Hendricks, Kiri Te Kanawa, Richard Rodney Bennett and many others.

In 1977, Tommy Reilly and Skaila formed a duo for harmonica and harp which lasted 22 years. They performed in concert and on television throughout Britain, Europe and South America, recording on the Chandos Records, the label for whom Skaila also recorded all the major French chamber music repertoire with the Academy of St. Martin in the Fields Chamber Ensemble, as well as Mozart's Concerto for flute and harp with Susan Milan, Richard Hickox and the City of London Sinfonia.

== Session musician ==
Kanga has been active as a session musician in many other musical genres. She has worked with artists such as Elton John, The Beatles, James Taylor, Pat Metheny, Chris de Burgh, Sumi Jo, James Galway, Roy Harper, Joni Mitchell and The Mission.

== Awards ==
- Fellowship: Royal Academy of Music, 1994
- Professor of University of London 2003

== Recent activity ==
- President of the Jury 2019 USA International Harp Competition.
- Mozart's Flute and Harp Concerto with Edward Beckett and the London Festival Orchestra.
- The recorded works of Mark-Anthony Turnage.
- August 2002, judge at the Lily Laskine Harp Competition in Paris.
- Guest of honour at the International Harp Competition in Bloomington, Indiana, 2004 (featuring a recital of her own compositions.)
- August 2004, gave a masterclass at the 6th European Harp Symposium in Lyon.
- Toured the Baltic Capitals as a recital soloist.
- Spring 2005, Skaila gave the opening recital of the Russian Harpists' Festival in Moscow.
- 2005 coast-to-coast lecture/recital tour of American universities.
- July 2005, gave a presentation on 'The Harp in the Film and Recording Industry' at the World Harp Congress in Dublin.
- Featured soloist with Richard Baker on P&O Oriana in October 2006.
- Jury member of the new composition award for the 2007 USA Harp Competition in Bloomington.
