= Jana Boušková =

Czech harpist (born 1970)

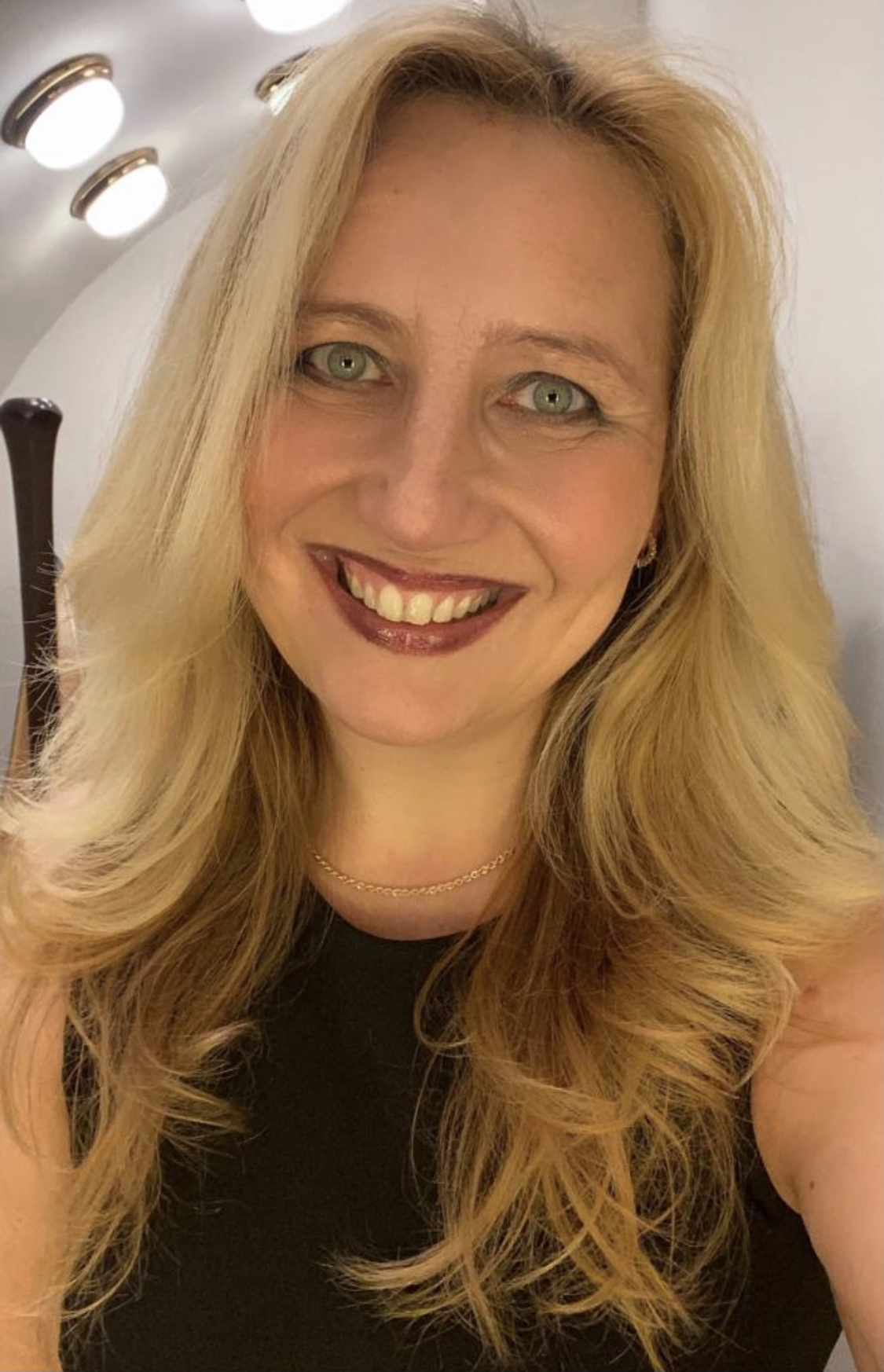
- Boušková in 2021
- Born: 27 September 1970 (age 55); Prague, Czechoslovakia
- Education: Indiana University Bloomington; University of Ostrava; Prague Conservatory
- Occupation: Musician
- Spouse: Jiří Kubita
- Children: 2
- Parents: Jiří Boušek (father); Libuše Váchalová (mother)
- Musical career
- Genres: Classical
- Instrument: Harp
- Website: janabouskova.com

Jana Boušková (born 27 September 1970) is a Czech harpist and pedagogue. She has been the principal harpist of the Czech Philharmonic since 2005. Boušková is also a professor at the Royal College of Music in London since 2019, the Academy of Performing Arts in Prague since 2007, and she was the harp teacher at the Royal Conservatory of Brussels from 2005 to 2020.

== Early life and education ==
Jana Boušková was born in Prague on 27 September 1970. She is the daughter of flutist Jiří Boušek and harpist Libuše Váchalová. She began playing the harp at a young age and gave her first recital when she was seven years old.

Boušková attended the Prague Conservatory and the University of Ostrava, where she studied under her mother. She graduated from the University of Ostrava in 1998, after years of distance learning. She recalled in 2017 that her mother was more demanding of her than other students, and that retrospectively, she is grateful to her for this. She also attended classes given by Alice Giles in Bayreuth, and studied under Susann McDonald at Indiana University Bloomington on a Fulbright scholarship.

== Music career ==
Boušková won the Maria Damm Rensch Prize at the first USA International Harp Competition in 1989. Three years later, she won the gold medal at the second USA International Harp Competition. She later became the official soloist of the harp maker Lyon & Healy and plays the Lyon & Healy Style 30 concert harp that she received as a prize for winning the second USA International Harp Competition. Also in 1992, Boušková took second place at the eleventh Israel International Harp Competition. She won first prize at the Grand Prix Concours International de Musique de Chambre de Paris in 1998 and the Torneo Internazionale di Musica in 1999. Boušková also received the Czech Republic's 1996 Talent of the Year Award and the 2002 Czech Music Council Award, in recognition of her representation of Czechs on the international stage.

As a soloist, Boušková has performed with the Czech Philharmonic, the Israel Philharmonic Orchestra, and the MDR Leipzig Radio Symphony Orchestra, among others. She was chosen to premiere Sergiu Natra's Sonata in One Movement in 1999. Other works Boušková has premiered include Ravi Shankar's Sonata for Cello and Harp, alongside Mstislav Rostropovich, and Benjamin Yusupov's Concerto for Flute, Violin, Viola, Harp and Orchestra, alongside Maxim Vengerov and others.

Boušková was harp professor at the Prague Conservatory from 1993 to 2012. In 2005, she became professor at the Royal Conservatory of Brussels and the Erasmus Brussels University of Applied Sciences and Arts. She was appointed professor at the Academy of Performing Arts in Prague in 2007 and took up the role of professor at the Royal College of Music in London in 2019. She has also taught at Indiana University Bloomington and the Geneva University of Music.

== Personal life ==
Boušková is married to Jiří Kubita, a violinist with the Czech Philharmonic. As of 2010, the couple have two sons, and both children play the violin.

== Selected discography ==
Boušková has contributed to numerous recordings for Czech and international record labels. The following list is compiled from her official website.

- Zvěrokruh, 1992. ARTA Records, No.: F1 0030-2
- Flöte und Harfe, 1992. Preiser Records, No.: PR 90154
- Czechoslovak Chamber Orchestra Live in Concert, 1993. Antiphona, No.: AA0008-2231
- Jana Boušková Harp Recital, 1993. Bohemia Music 1991, No.: BM 0002-2131
- Jana Boušková Harp, 1993. Panton Records, No.: 81 1228-2031
- Dona nobis pacem, 1994. Český rozhlas Ostrava, No.: UHL 002-2 231
- Jan Ladislav Dusík, 1994. Panton Records, No.: 81 1289-2 131
- Prague Salon at the Nostitz Palace (Harp Recital), 1994. Alfea a Pragokoncert, No.: 584006 – 2 111
- Concertino II, 1995. PolyGram, No.: 454 146-2
- Jana Boušková plays works by J. F. Fischer, 1995. Panton Records, No.: 81 1290-2 131
- Jan Křtitel Krumpholtz – Concertos for Harp and Orchestra 1, 1996. Clarton, No.: CQ 0018-2 031
- Emil Viklický – Homage to Josip Plečnik, 1996. Lotus, No.: LT 0036 – 2 131
- Hindemith, 1996. Chandos Records, No.: Chan 9457
- Snění, 1997. Supraphon, No.: SU 3368-2 231
- Ai in Praha, 1997. Sony Music Entertainment, No.: KSC4 901
- Balady, 1997. Forte + Vydavatelství bratří Nedvědů, No.: FOR 0009-2311
- Jan Křtitel Krumpholtz – Concertos for Harp and Orchestra 2, 1997. Clarton, No.: CQ 0029-2 031
- Rodolphe Kreutzer Six Nocturnes, 1997. Gramofonové závody Loděnice, No.: L1 0323-2 131
- Jana Boušková plays Virtuoso Encores, 1998–2003. Panton Records, Bonton Music, Supraphon, No.: 71 0526-2
- Kouzelné housle, 1999. Supraphon, No.: SU 3418-2 031
- Solos for harp, 1999. Supraphon, No.: SU 3430-2 131
- Harfenkonzerte, 1999. Ebs Records, No.: ebs 6085
- International Music Festival Český Krumlov, 1999. Auviex, No.: AE 0019-2 031
- Prague Holiday, 2001. Octavia Records, No.: OVCL-00050
- Zpívání o lásce (Moravské lidové písně), 2001. Supraphon, No.: SU 5359-2 731
- Paul Freeman Introduces Exotic Concertos, 2002. Albany Records, No.: B000QWOB2A
- Romance, 2003. Octavia Records, No.: OVCC-00059
- ZIPANG meets Boušková in Prague, 2003. Octavia Records, No.: OVCC-0149
- Flûte & Harpe, 2003. Scam/Syrius, No.: SYR 141351
- Otomar Kvěch, 2003. Radioservis ve spolupráci s OSA a Život umělce
- French Chamber Music, 2004. EMI Music Germany, No.: 5 57798 2
- Album lásky, 2004. Supraphon, No.: SU 3768-2 031
- A la fantasia, 2005. Octavia Records, No.: OVCC-00008
- Contemporary Czech Masterpieces Jan F. Fischer, 2005. Triga, No. Tri 0010-2031
- Bohuslav Martinů Chamber Music with Viola, 2008. Supraphon, No.: SU 3952-2
- Spannungen, 2008. Avi-Service for music, Deutschlandradio, No.: 8553100
- Vánoční zpěvy a koledy, 2008. Radioservis, No.: CR 0433-2
- Umění milovati, 2010. Clarton, No.: CQ 0086-2
- Dvořák – Schumann – Reinmann (Spannungen), 2010. Avi-Service for music, Deutschlandradio, No.: 8553207
- Foerster / The Complete String Quartets, 2010. Supraphon, No.: SU 4050-2
- Winds & Strings, 2011. Avi-Service for music, Deutschlandradio, No.:8553261
