= Tango Distinto =

Tango Distinto is a solo album by the trombonist Achilles Liarmakopoulos of Astor Piazolla's music.

This album is the first to appear with Piazzolla's music played by solo trombone.

With ten popular compositions it showcases the combination of the trombone with a number of different instruments and in the context of different moods that underline the composer's romantic, erotic, passionate, nostalgic, imaginative and always generously warm-spirited music.

== Musicians ==
- Achilles Liarmakopoulos - trombone
- Hector Del Curto - bandoneon
- Octavio Brunetti - piano
- Pedro Giraudo - bass
- Simon Powis - guitar
- Ian Rosenbaum - marimba
- Robert Thompson - piano
- Samuel Adams - bass
- Edson Schein - Violin
- Jiyun Han - violin
- Raul Garcia - Viola
- Arnold Choi - cello

== Track listing ==
1. "Michelangelo"
2. "Cafe 1930"
3. "Nightclub 1960"
4. "Soledad"
5. "Le Grand Tango"
6. "Oblivion"
7. "Escualo"
8. "La muerte del angel"
9. "Milonga del angel"
10. "Resurrección del angel"

== Production ==
- Engineer - Mateusz Zechowski
- Mixing/Mastering - Dixon Van Winkle
- Producers - Achilles Liarmakopoulos & Gustavo Fernandez
- Liner notes - Constantine P. Carambelas-Sgourdas
- Cover art - Chrisa Liarmacopoulou
