= Beta Collide =

Beta Collide is a music ensemble from Oregon that focuses on the collision of musical art forms. Beta Collide has participated in many festivals such as the Astoria Music Festival and the Oregon Bach Festival. The directors of Beta Collide are Molly Barth, Grammy-Award-winning flutist, chamber and orchestral musician and trumpeter/conductor Brian McWhorter. Their debut album is Psst...Psst!.

== Composition of the group ==
Beta Collide is music ensemble based in Oregon which is directed by Molly Barth and Brian McWhorter(formerly of Meridian Arts Ensemble). Members include Molly Barth on flute, Brian McWhorter on trumpet and flügelhorn, David Riley on piano and celesta, and Phillip Patti on percussion.

Beta Collide focuses on the collision of musical art forms for example, from new to older; from radically extended technique to site-specific improvisation; from popular to the academy.

Beta Collide has been featured at the Astoria Music Festival, Oregon Bach Festival, Women Composers International Contemporary Music Festival [Seoul], New Music at Willamette, Music Today Festiva, and the Wet Ink Music Series [Stanford University]. Beta Collide has also contributed to exhibitions for the Cantor Arts Center [Palo Alto], The Project [New York] DiverseWorks Art Space [Houston], and music videos [World Wide Web]. Beta Collide’s Portland debut concert was hailed by The Oregonian as one of the top 10 classical music concerts of 2008. Their debut album named Psst…Psst! [Innova] has had many favorable reviews including being called one of the top 5 classical albums of 2010 by the Willamette Week.

== Directors ==
Molly Alicia Barth is a Grammy-Award-winning flutist, chamber, and orchestral musician, specialized in the music of today. She was granted the 2000 Naumburg Chamber Music Award, the 1998, 2000 and 2002 CMA/ASCAP Awards for Adventurous Programming, and first prize at the 1998 Concert Artists Guild International Competition. She is the Assistant Professor of Flute at the University of Oregon and has taught at Willamette University and held residencies at the University of Chicago and at the University of Richmond.

Brian McWhorter is one of the most sought-after performers and teachers of his generation. Member of the Meridian Arts Ensemble, McWhorter has worked with Sequitur, Elliott Sharp, Ensemble Sospeso, New Jersey Symphony Orchestra, Metropolitan Opera Orchestra, the BargeMusic Festival Orchestra, Mark Applebaum, and John Cale). He is also assistant professor of trumpet at the University of Oregon and Professor of Contemporary Music at the Manhattan School of Music. Named by The New York Times as a “terrific trumpeter”, McWhorter’s discography goes through genres like contemporary chamber or orchestral, improvised music, pop and rock, etc.

== Psst…Psst! Debut Album ==
"Psst...psst!" comes from the opening track, a chamber arrangement of György Ligeti's "Mysteries of the Macabre" a giddily anarchic play of instrumental outbursts and spoken word. "Memories of an Echo," evocative of the ancient Japanese court music tradition, gagaku; and dreamy washes of distorted sound in Stephen Vitiello's "Yellow."

The record features absurdly virtuosic music by Ligeti and Erickson, it features also soundscapes by Kyr and Vitiello, a Rzewski trifecta. It also includes music by Frederic Rzewski (his "Mollitude," composed for Barth), Valentin Silvestrov and Radiohead. Thom Yorke and Colin Greenwood contribute to a remix of that band's "Nude."

== Track List ==
Title Composer(s) Performer(s) Length

Mysteries of the Macabre György Ligeti Beta Collide 6:40

Mollitude Frederic Rzewski Beta Collide 2:59

Trio Valentin Silvestrov Beta Collide 9:18

Memories of an Echo Robert Kyr Beta Collide 9:08

Nanosonata No.7 + Mollitude Frederic Rzewski Beta Collide 2:56

Waterline Stephen Vitiello Beta Collide 6:16

Kryl Robert Erickson Beta Collide 6:11

Nanosonata No.7 Frederic Rzewski Beta Collide 2:42

Yellow Stephen Vitiello Beta Collide 4:44

Nude Radiohead Beta Collide 2:10

== See also ==
Festival Internacional Cervantino
