= Fred Mills (musician) =

W. Fred Mills
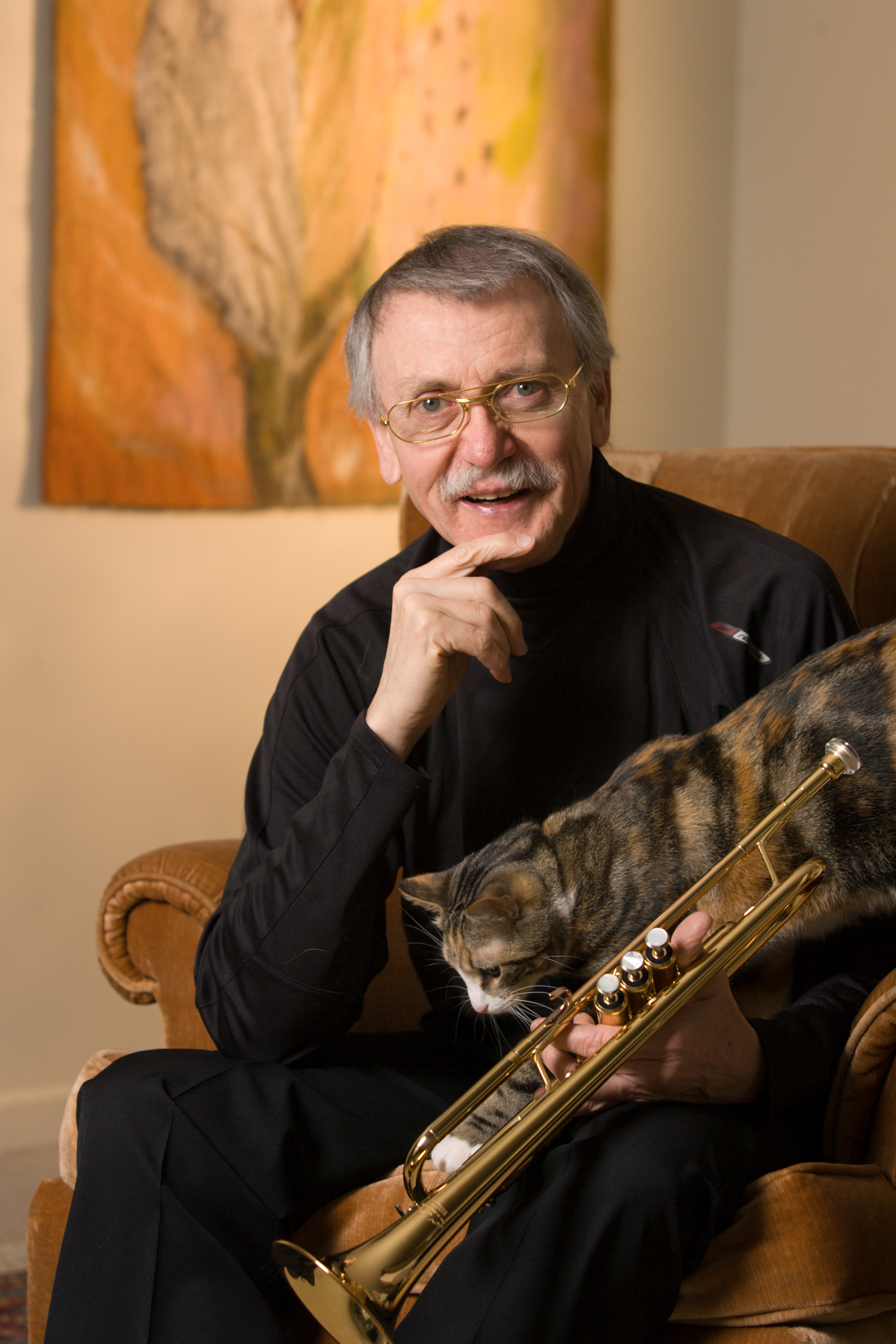

Background information
- Also known as: Fred Mills
- Born: William Frederick Mills; March 15, 1935
- Origin: Guelph, Ontario, Canada
- Died: September 7, 2009 (aged 74) Walton County, Georgia, U.S.
- Genres: Classical and chamber music
- Occupation(s): musician, professor
- Instrument(s): Trumpet, Piccolo Trumpet, Flugelhorn, Cornet, Corno da Caccia
- Labels: Philips, RCA, BMG, CBS, Opening Day

William Frederick Mills (March 15, 1935 – September 7, 2009) was a Canadian trumpeter and educator best known for his work with the Canadian Brass quintet from 1972 to 1996. He also served as a professor for the University of Georgia from 1996 until 2009.

He also played solo, first-chair trumpet with the American Symphony Orchestra and the Houston Symphony Orchestra under Leopold Stokowski, the New York City Opera Orchestra, the New York City Ballet, American Ballet Theatre, the National Arts Center Orchestra of Canada, the Casals Festival Orchestra in Puerto Rico and others, according to a biography from the University of Georgia.

He attended the Juilliard School of Music and held honorary doctorates from the New England Conservatory in Boston and Hartwick College. Mills earned a bachelor of science degree in music from Hartwick in 1957.

The Canadian Brass ensemble performed hundreds of his arrangements including Toccata and Fugue in D minor, BWV 565, which appeared on the album The Pachelbel Canon and Other Great Baroque Hits, released in 1980.

On September 7, 2009, Mills was killed in a car crash in Walton County, about 45 miles east of Atlanta. Mills was driving to his Athens home from Atlanta's airport after a trip to Quincinetto, Italy where he was a soloist at the Pentabrass Festival.

A CD in Mills' honor was released by AppleJazz Records. Produced by Louise Baranger and Charlie Bertini, To Fred With Love, The World's Finest Brass Players Pay Tribute to Fred Mills, includes performances by Canadian Brass, Phil Smith, Joe Alessi, Arturo Sandoval, Charles Schlueter, Allen Vizzutti, Marvin Stamm, Warren Vaché, Chris Martin, the Pentabrass, the German Brass and many others. 100% of the profits from the CD benefit the W. Fred Mills Scholarship fund at the University of Georgia, Athens.

== Partial discography ==
- Scriabin - The Poem of Ecstasy - Stokowski - Houston Symphony

WITH THE CANADIAN BRASS:

- Make We Joy (1973)
- Royal Fanfare (1973)
- A Touch of Brass, Canadian Brass in Paris (1973)
- Rag-Ma-Tazz (1974)
- Canadian Brass: Pachelbel to Joplin (1974)
- Raffi's Christmas Album a 1983 music album by children's entertainer Raffi
- Unexplored Territory (1977)
- Canadian Brass Plus Organ (1977)
- Toccata, Fugues & Other Diversions (1977)
- Canadian Brass Encore (1977)
- Bells and Brass (1978, with Gordon Slater)
- Mostly Fats; Fats Waller's Greatest Hits (1979)
- Pachelbel Canon & Other Great Baroque Hits (1980)
- Christmas with the Canadian Brass (1981)
- The Village Band (1981)
- Champions (1983)
- Canadian Brass Greatest Hits (1983)
- High, Bright, Light and Clear (1983)
- Ain't Misbehavin' and Other Fats Waller Hits (1984)
- Brass in Berlin (1984)
- Canadian Brass Live! (1984)
- A Canadian Brass Christmas (1985)
- Vivaldi: The Four Seasons (1986)
- Basin Street (1987)
- Strike Up the Band — Canadian Brass Plays Gershwin (1987)
- Bach: The Art of Fugue (1988)
- The Mozart Album (1988)
- Canadian Brass More Greatest Hits (1988)
- Best of the Canadian Brass (1989)
- Gabrieli/Monteverdi: Antiphonal Music (1990)
- English Renaissance Music (1990)
- Super Hits, The Christmas Album (1990)
- Beethoven Fifth Symphony & Overtures (1991)
- Red, White & Brass: Made in the USA (1991)
- The Essential Canadian Brass (1991)
- Red Hot Jazz: The Dixieland Album (1992)
- Wagner for Brass (1992)
- Rejoice! with Brass and Voice (1993)
- An Evening of Brass Theater (1994)
- Brass on Broadway (1994)
- Gabrieli for Brass (1994)
- Noel (1994)
- Bolero & Other Great Melodies (1995)
- Brass Busters (1995)
- Fireworks: Baroque Brass Favorites (1995)
- Go for Baroque! (1995)
- Ragtime (1995)
- Renaissance Men (1995)
- Swingtime! (1995)

VIDEO/DVD:

- Brass Theater II with Star of Indiana (1995)
- Brass Theater III with Star of Indiana (1996)
- Canadian Brass Home Movies (Grammy nomination)
