= Achilles Liarmakopoulos =

- Born: 29 August 1985 (age 41); Athens, Greece
- Occupations: Musician, trombone professor
- Instrument: Trombone

Achilles Liarmakopoulos (Greek: Αχιλλέας Λιαρμακόπουλος; born 29 August 1985) is a Greek trombonist best known for his work with the Canadian Brass from 2011 to 2024.

== Early life and education ==
Born in Athens, Greece, Liarmakopoulos started trombone lessons at the Philippos Nakas Conservatory, graduating with Excellent Unanimous and first prize. At the age of 18, Liarmakopoulos performed as a soloist at the Walt Disney Hall as the Grand Prize Winner of the Pasadena Showcase House Instrumental Competition, judged by members of the Los Angeles Philharmonic.

Liarmakopoulos holds degrees from the Yale School of Music, the Curtis Institute of Music (class of 2008), the San Francisco Conservatory of Music, and the Philippos Nakas Conservatory in his hometown of Athens, Greece. His studies have been supported by merit-based scholarships, Bok Foundation and Milton L. Rock Annual Fellowships and scholarships from the Henry and Lucy Moses Fund, Alexandros S. Onassis Foundation, and the Greek State Scholarship Foundation. Yale University awarded him the Philip Francis Nelson Prize for outstanding musicianship.

== Career ==
In December 2010, Liarmakopoulos won the position of principal trombone of the Greek Radio Symphony Orchestra, where he played for one season before joining the Canadian Brass. He has also performed with the Bern Symphony Orchestra, Malaysian Philharmonic, Jacksonville Symphony, Philadelphia Orchestra, and European Union Youth Orchestra.

His debut solo album, Ástor Piazzolla: Tango Distinto was released by Naxos Records in 2011. It is the first full album to feature Astor Piazzolla's music on solo trombone.

In 2013, Liarmakopoulos released his second solo album titled Discoveries with new works for trombone and piano, collaborating with piano soloist Amy J. Yang.

In January 2013, Liarmakopoulos was invited to play with the Oregon-based genre-bending ensemble Pink Martini. Since then, he has performed with them regularly all over the world.

Liarmakopoulos' third album Trombone Atrevido with choro music from Brazil was released in July 2015 on the ODEG label. The album was produced by guitarist Spiros Exaras and mastered by Bernie Grundman at the Bernie Grundman Mastering Studios-Los Angeles, CA.

In 2017, he released his fourth solo album titled Ethereal. The album features six brand new compositions and five arrangements with an exceptional roster of musicians from all over the world, including Fernando Suarez Paz from Astor Piazzolla's legendary Tango Quintet.

Liarmakopoulos was an adjunct trombone professor at Brooklyn College in New York City.

In 2018, he formed Cuatrombon with Jorge Glem on cuatro, Manuel Rangel on maracas, and Bam Bam Rodriguez on bass. Together they released three singles of Venezuelan music and, in 2020, an album entitled "Volar."

In 2022 he won the trombone position with the Athens State Orchestra

=== Premieres ===
Liarmakopoulos is a supporter of new music and new works for trombone, and has premiered a number of pieces by new composers. Four Trombone concertos and several chamber pieces have been written specifically for him . He premiered Dream (for trombone solo, string orchestra and harp) by Andrew Cadima at the Curtis Institute of Music in May 2008.

=== Dedicated works ===
- "Anaklasis" for Solo Trombone - Vagelis Simsiris (1998)
- Concerto" for Trombone and Orchestra - John Ellis
- "Dream" - Concerto for Trombone and Strings - Andrew Cadima (2008)
- "Opening of the 2nd Gate" - Concerto for Trombone - Joowan Kim (2008)
- "Indigo" for Trombone and Piano - John Ellis (2009)
- "Tango Paradiso" for Trombone and piano - John Ellis (2009)
- "The bounds of Spring" for Trombone and Harp- Taylor Roland (2010)
- "Ypopsia" for Trombone and Piano- Andrew Cadima (2010)
- "Chinese suite" for Trombone and Piano - Hua Yang (2010)
- "Krakatoa" for Trombone and Marimba - Stephen Feigenbaum (2010)
- "Concertino" for Trombone and Strings - Dinos Costantinides (2012)
- "Chorinho do sol"for Trombone and Guitar- Spiros Exaras (2014)
- Tango for two, please! - Noelia Escalzo (2015)
- "Distance" for Trombone and Trombone Choir - Andrew Cadima (2015)
- "Sleepwalker" for Trombone and harp - Andrew Cadima (2016)
- "Trombonsillo" for Trombone and piano - Carolina Calvache (2016)
- "Oscuro Silencio" for Tango quintet - Gabriel Senanes (2017)
- "Nostos" for trombone and harp - Spiros Exaras (2017)
- "Tango y Milonga" for Trombone and Piano - Pablo Estigarribia (2018)
- "In memoriam Theodore Antoniou" for trombone and harp - Michalis Andronikou (2019)
- "Endlessness" for solo trombone - Brandon Ridenour (2019)
- "The Dwarf Planets" for Solo Trombone - Spiros Exaras (2020)
- "Dance of Tears" for Trombone and Marimba - Spiros Exaras (2021)
- "Kitrino" for trombone and string quartet (arrangement)- Nikos Kypourgos (2022)
- "Three Secrets of the Rain" for Trombone and Piano- Spiros Exaras (2022)
- "Adagio Enigmatique" for Trombone and String Orchestra - Saint-Preux (2023)
- Sunbeam - Trombone Concerto for Trombone and Orchestra - Alexandros Livitsanos (2025)

== Competitions and awards ==
- Second Christian Lindberg International Solo Competition: Second Prize
- International Trombone Festival Robert Marsteller/Conn-Selmer Competition: Winner
- International Trombone Festival Solo Competition: Winner
- International Trombone Festival Larry Wiehe Competition: Winner
- San Francisco Conservatory of Music Concerto Competition: Winner
- Pasadena Showcase House Instrumental Competition: Grand-prize winner
- 2010 Yale School of Music Woolsey Hall Concerto Competition: Honorable Mention

== Discography ==
=== Solo ===
- Tango Distinto – Astor Piazzolla (2011, Naxos Records)
- Discoveries – New works for trombone and piano (2014, ODEG)
- Trombone Atrevido - Choro music from Brazil (2015, ODEG)
- Ethereal - (2017, AL)
- Obvious - with harpist Coline-Marie Orliac - (2018, AL)
- Volar - with Cuatrombón - (2020, AL)

=== EPs ===
- Chorinho a Tres - with Samuel Adams & Ian O'Sullivan (2009)
- Tango y Milonga - with Pablo Estigarribia (2019)
- Apasionado - with Jaime Henao (2022)
- Galazio - with Thomas Paradeisis Mihalis Kalkanis Giannis Galanis (2025)

=== Singles ===
- I will never forget - composed and performed along Spiros Exaras (2019)
- Transitions - with Andreas Rolandos Theodorou - composed by Carolina Calvache (2020)
- Milonga en Re - Astor Piazzolla (2011)
- Color Perfume - Fervorchestra conducted by Gabriel Senanes (2019)
- Teu Aniversario - Pixinguinha (2019)
- Ahora - with Manuel Rangel (2019)
- Chorando em Sao Paolo - with Vitor Goncalvez & Sergio Krakowksi
- Transitions - with Andreas Rolandos Theodorou - composed by Carolina Calvache (2020)
- Distance - with The University of Oklahoma Trombone Choir under the direction of Irvin Wagner - Andrew Cadima - 2020
- Christmas Fantasy - Spiros Exaras (2020)
- In Memoriam Theodore Antoniou (2021)
- La Flambée Montalbanaise - with Cordeone (2021)
- Red Moon of Love - Dimitris Gouzios - with Kostas Avgerinos (2022)
- Elegie - Max Peters - with Krista Malerba (2022)
- A Nuvem Triste - Alexandros Livitsanos - with Kahlo Quartet
- Kumru - Fazil Say - with Victoria Kiazimi (2023)
- Oportunidad - Carolina Calvache (2023)
- Three Secrets of rain - with Georgia Lazaridou & Spiros Exaras (2023)
- Adagio Enigmatique - with Greek German Youth Orchestra (2024)
- Pentasimo - with Kostas Avgerinos & Victoria Kiazimi (2025)
- Dance of Tears - with Theodor milkov & Spiros Exaras (2025)
- Jeanne y Paul - with Angela Draghicescu Elias Goldstein Steven Schermer
- Marquinhos no Frevo - with Victoria kiazimi (2025)
- Elegie - with Christian Lindberg & Victoria Kiazimi (2025)

=== With the Canadian Brass ===
- Canadian Brass Takes Flight (2011)
- Brass Romance (2012, single)
- Carnaval (Robert Schumann's Kinderszenen and Carnaval) (2013)
- Christmas Time is Here (2013)
- Great Wall of China (2014)
- Perfect Landing (2015)
- Volks Lieder - Canadian Brass with the Hannover Boy Choir (2019)
- Canadiana (2021)
