= Charles Daellenbach =

Canadian classical tubist and music educator (born 1945)

Charles Daellenbach C.M.
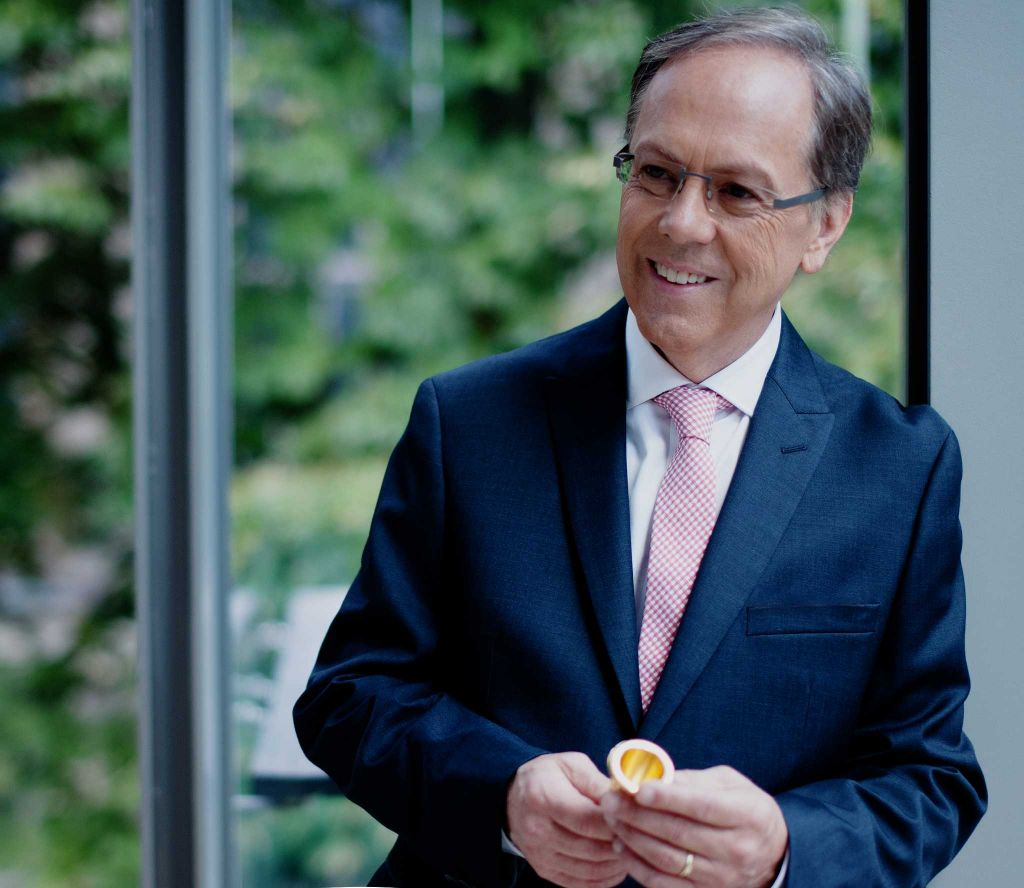
- Born: Conrad Charles Daellenbach; July 12, 1945 (age 81); Rhinelander, Wisconsin, U.S.
- Other name: "Chuck"
- Education: Eastman School of Music
- Occupation: Musician
- Children: 2
- Musical career
- Genre: Classical
- Instrument: Tuba
- Years active: 1970–present
- Member of: Canadian Brass

Conrad Charles Daellenbach C.M. (/ˈdɛlənbɑːk/ DEL-ən-bahk; born July 12, 1945) is an American and Canadian tubist. He is best known as one of the founding members of the Canadian Brass, in which he remains the quintet's tuba player, publisher, business administrator and professional relationships manager. Daellenbach is one of the most recorded tuba performers in history.

== Early life and personal life ==
Conrad Charles Daellenbach was born to a musical family in Rhinelander, Wisconsin, on July 12, 1945. Descended from four generations of Swiss and German musicians, he followed his two older sisters into the choirs, bands and orchestras taught by his father. As a young player, Daellenbach met and studied with the legendary artist/teacher Arnold Jacobs, followed by early entry to the Eastman School of Music while still in high school, eventually graduating with a Bachelor of Music in 1966, a Master of Arts in 1968 and a Ph.D. in 1971. Daellenbach first met Arnold Jacobs at the Gunnison, Colorado Music Festival in 1962, a relationship that lasted throughout Jacobs' lifetime.

== Career ==
Daellenbach moved to Toronto and taught music at the Faculty of Music at the University of Toronto. Canadian Brass was formed in 1970 by Daellenbach and trombonist Gene Watts, enlisting trumpeter Stuart Laughton and University of Toronto Business School graduate Graeme Page. As of 2020, Daellenbach had performed fifty years with a seven-thousand performance streak in the ensemble, often compared to the famous baseball hall-of-famer Cal Ripken Jr. who played 2632 consecutive games.

Daellenbach's contributions to the brass world include over 600 standard repertoire works for brass quintets, more than 30 best-selling concert band versions of the most popular Canadian Brass repertoire, and an educational series that has sold nearly one million copies worldwide. His recording company, Opening Day Entertainment (ODEG), has produced over 73 CDs and DVDs. Three ODEG CDs have been top-10 Billboard hits, four have received Juno Awards, and 13 have been Juno nominated.

Ten most defining events for Daellenbach within Canadian Brass are:

1. Ten appearances on Sesame Street

2. Ambassadors to China in 1977 sent by Prime Minister Pierre Elliot Trudeau

3. First chamber ensemble to play the MAINSTAGE at Carnegie Hall in NYC

4. Successful appearance on the Johnny Carson Tonight Show

5. Feature artist on Hunan TV's New Year's Show viewed by over half a billion viewers 2012

6. Nominated for 17 Junos (Canadian Grammy), winner of the German Echo Award (German Grammy) and several Grammy nominations

7. Voted "Audience Favourite Tuba Player" by Brass Bulletin

8. Schweizerhof Hotel in Lucerne Switzerland designates Room 182 as the "Daellenbach Room"

9. Daellenbach invited to the Board of Euterpe Music (Toronto), honorary board memory of The Coalition for Music Education (Canada) and former board member Music Educators National Conference (USA)

10. Eastman School of Music named Dr. Daellenbach "Distinguished Alumnus.”

In 2014, he was made a Member of the Order of Canada "for popularizing classical music, notably as a founder of the Canadian Brass, one of our nation's most internationally renowned classical music groups".

As of 2025, Daellenbach still plays in Canadian Brass and, with the retirement of Gene Watts in 2010, is the last original member touring with the group.

== Personal life ==
Daellenbach is separated, with two sons. He resides in Toronto as does his son Chris. His other son, Willis, lives in Los Angeles.
