= Gene Watts =

American musician

- Born: Eugene Watts; Sedalia, Missouri, U.S.
- Genres: Jazz
- Instruments: Trombone

Eugene "Gene" Watts is an American-Canadian trombonist and a founding member of the Canadian Brass, a brass quintet based in Canada.

== Early life and education ==
Watts was born and raised in Sedalia, Missouri, and studied at the University of Missouri School of Music and New England Conservatory of Music.

== Career ==
Watts worked as an orchestral trombonist for several American orchestras. He was hand-picked by conductor Seiji Ozawa as principal trombonist for the Toronto Symphony, where he met Charles Daellenbach, and persuaded him to start the Canadian Brass in 1970.

In 2010, he retired from touring, and is now listed as an "Emeritus" member of the Canadian Brass. He currently resides in Toronto. He is a teacher (emeritus) of the Transcendental Meditation program, having been trained in India personally by Maharishi Mahesh Yogi.
