= Paul Lewis (British composer) =

- Born: 1943 (age 82–83); Brighton, United Kingdom
- Genres: Classical
- Occupations: Musician, Composer, Conductor
- Website: https://paullewiscomposer.com

Paul Lewis (born in Brighton, England, in 1943) is a British composer best known for his work in television music, production library music, and classical concert music.

== Early life and education ==
Born into a family of professional musicians, Lewis started learning piano from age nine, but did not receive any formal musical training and left school at the age of fifteen to work in the music publishing industry.

Although self-taught in composition and orchestration, his orchestral works were being recorded by production music libraries by the age of nineteen.

At age twenty, he was appointed Assistant Musical Adviser to ABC Television and soon began composing music for major television dramas. Three years later, he left the position to work full-time as a freelance composer and conductor, developing a prolific career in British television.

== Television and library music ==
Over the next decades, he composed scores for over 150 different TV productions, ranging from dramas (notably featuring Peter O’Toole and Orson Welles), Monty Python and Benny Hill comedies, and children’s favourites such as Woof! and Bernard’s Watch.

His credits include:

- The Dark Angel (BBC drama starring Peter O’Toole)
- Woof! (a long-running children’s series, winner of an International Emmy Award),
- Bernard’s Watch,
- Seal Morning (1986 series),
- The Prisoner of Zenda (1984 BBC mini-series),
- Arthur of the Britons (for which Lewis orchestrated the main theme by Elmer Bernstein and composed incidental music)

His music was also featured in comedy series such as The Benny Hill Show, Sponge Bob Square Pants, and Monty Python’s Flying Circus, through his contributions to production music libraries.

A compilation of his TV work, Three Decades of Television Themes, was released by classical music label Campion Cameo in 2002.

== Concert and recorded works ==
Later in his career, Lewis shifted his focus to concert music, creating a substantial body of classical works including orchestral suites, concertos, chamber and solo pieces, many of which have been recorded and broadcast.

He wrote extensively for the harp in particular, which he claims is his favourite instrument. He has worked with and saw his pieces premiered by several of the most prominent concert harpists, including Marie Goossens,Gabriella Dall’Olio, Sheila Bromberg, Rachel Talitman, Maia Darmé, Skaila Kanga, and former partner Elizabeth Jane Baldry.

Some of his instrumental works appear in ABRSM and Trinity College London examination syllabuses for flute, harp, and piano.

Lewis also conducted concerts worldwide, premiering his commissioned works in America, New Zealand, Italy, and Turkey.

== Musical style ==
Lewis’ music is typically tonal, accessible and melody driven. His concert works are often characterised by their romantic, light or lyrical nature.

== Personal life ==
Beyond music, Lewis in interested in medieval and renaissance history, art and architecture. He has restored three medieval houses in his spare time.

He married soprano and songwriter Sharon Elizabeth in 2007.

== Discography ==
Lewis’ music has been featured on several CDs, both solo and within multi-composer collections. Notable recordings include:

=== Single-composer albums ===
- Three Decades of Television Themes (Campion Cameo), 2002
- Heritage and Landscape (EM Records)
- Harpscape (EM Records), 2018
- Harpscenes (EM Records), 2020
- Romantic Music for Harp (Harp & Company), 2021
- Serenade and Dance, the Romantic Harmonica Music of Paul Lewis (Campion Cameo), 2024
- Arthur of the Britons, Original Soundtrack (Silva Screen Records), 2013

=== Multi‑composer compilations featuring his works ===
- British Celebration 2 (Heritage Records), 2017
- Crepuscule, Aurora Trio (EM Records)
- British Serenade 2 (Heritage Records)
- British Serenade (Heritage Records)
- Legends of Rotorua (Atoll CD), 2016
- Originals (Da Vinci Classics), 2024
- Richard III (EM Records)
- Now Comes Beauty (EM Records)
- Set in Silver (EM Records)
- Summer Was in August (EM Records), 2019
- The World of the Flute (Polyphonic)
- British Light Music Discoveries 2 (ASV)
- British Light Music Discoveries 4 (ASV)
- British Light Music Discoveries 5 (ASV)
- British Light Overtures (ASV)
- London Landmarks (ASV)
- Entente Cordiale (ASV)
- Halcyon Days – A Treasury of British Light Music (Sanctuary Classics)
- The Best of British Light Music (Resonance/Sanctuary Classics)
- Sailing By – British Light Classics (Decca)
- English String Miniatures 4 (Naxos)
- English String Miniatures 5 (Naxos)
- English String Miniatures 6 (Naxos)
- English Music for Strings (Campion Cameo)
- South West Sinfonietta and Friends in Concert 2
- Light Fantastic! (Clovelly)
- Concert Favourites
- Harpicide at Midnight (Auriel Productions)
- Testcard 7 (Apollo Sound)
- Forget‑Me‑Not – Forgotten Love Songs and Loves Best Forgotten
- Forget‑Me‑Not Wears the Trousers – Banned and Risqué Songs of the 20s and 30s
