= Ronald Romm =

- Born: December 4, 1946 (age 78); New York, New York
- Genres: Classical
- Instrument: Trumpet
- Formerly of: Canadian Brass

Ronald Romm (born December 4, 1946) is an American trumpet player. He was a longtime member of Canadian Brass and is widely acknowledged as one of the top trumpeters and clinicians today.

== Biography ==
Romm was born in New York to a musical family who had their own dance band. He was considered a child prodigy and began his soloist career at the age of ten. He attended the University of Southern California on a scholarship and played in the Los Angeles Philharmonic. He continued his studies at Juilliard where he earned two music degrees and was taught by William Vacchiano.

In 1971 Romm joined the then recently formed Canadian Brass, which he was a member of until he retired in June 2000. During his time, he performed in over 4,500 concerts and 60 recordings. He rejoined the group from 2006 to 2010 as a member of the "dream team" of trumpeters. He has performed with leading orchestras and artists including Wynton Marsalis, Arturo Sandoval, Jon Faddis, and Doc Severinsen. Romm and his wife, Avis, continue an active performing career as a piano and trumpet duo.

In 2001, he was appointed the professor of trumpet at the University of Illinois Urbana-Champaign from where he retired in 2021. Romm has given hundreds of clinics and masterclasses worldwide.

Romm is Yamaha Artist.

== Recognitions ==
In 1985 as a member of Canadian Brass Romm won the Juno Award Instrumental Artist of the Year.

He has received three honorary doctorates from Hartwick College, New England Conservatory, and McMaster University.

Romm was voted one of the "Top 12 Brass Players of the 20th Century" by Brass Bulletin Magazine.

In 2012 he was awarded the International Trumpet Guild Honorary Award (lifetime achievement).

== Discography ==
=== As a leader or co-Leader ===
- Living The Dream (Wellness For The Soul, Volume 2): 2002, with Avis Romm (Not On Label)
- Meditations For Trumpet: 2009 (Summit Records)
- Mike Vax and Ron Romm: 2018, with Mike Vax (Summit Records)

=== As a sideman ===
- Canadian Brass
