= USA International Harp Competition =

Triennial harp competition

The USA International Harp Competition (USAIHC) was founded in 1989 by harpist and pedagogue Susann McDonald. It is the only international harp competition held in the United States, and it is one of only seven music competitions in the United States to belong to the World Federation of International Music Competitions.

The Competition is held every three years at the Jacobs School of Music on the campus of Indiana University and is open to harpists of all nationalities ages 18 to 32. Since its inception, over 400 harpists from 19 countries have competed for this coveted title. Prizes including a commemorative, Concert Grand Gold Harp designed and built specifically for the USAIHC by Lyon & Healy Harps are awarded at the competition. Cash prizes are also awarded through eighth place.

== Winners ==
=== 2025 ===
- First Prize – Shamim Minoo
- Second Prize – Zhong Ming Wan
- Third Prize – Huw Boucher

=== 2022 ===
- First Prize – Noël Wan
- Second Prize – Huw Boucher
- Third Prize – Hyejin Kim

=== 2019 ===
- First Prize – Mélanie Laurent
- Second Prize – Valerio Lisci
- Third Prize – Mathilde Wauters

=== 2016 ===
- First Prize – Katherine Siochi
- Second Prize – Elizabeth Bass
- Third Prize – Lenka Petrovic

=== 2013 ===
- First Prize – Remy van Kesteren
- Second Prize – Marta Marinelli
- Third Prize – Emily Levin

=== 2010 ===
- First Prize – Agnès Clément
- Second Prize – Rino Kageyama
- Third Prize – Vasilisa Lushchevskaya

=== 2007 ===
- First Prize – Maria Krushevskaya
- Second Prize – Hanako Hirano
- Third Prize – Coline-Marie Orliac

=== 2004 ===
- First Prize – Emmanuel Ceysson
- Second Prize – Julie Ann Smith
- Third Prize – Lavinia Meijer

=== 2001 ===
- First Prize – Dan Yu
- Second Prize – Maria Luisa Rayán
- Third Prize – Julie Ann Smith

=== 1998 ===
- First Prize – Xavier de Maistre
- Second Prize – Maria Luisa Rayán
- Third Prize – Kyo-jin Lee

=== 1995 ===
- First Prize – Gaëlle Vandernoot
- Second Prize – Marie-Pierre Langlamet
- Third Prize – Gaëlle Thouvenin

=== 1992 ===
- First Prize – Jana Boušková
- Second Prize – Beatrice Guillermin
- Third Prize – Nika Riabchinenko

=== 1989 ===
- First Prize – Maria Casale
- Second Prize – Elizabeth Hainen
- Third Prize – Kirsten Agresta
