= Union of Female Musician Artists =

The Union des Femmes Artistes Musiciennes (UFAM) was a non-profit organization founded in Paris in 1910 and dissolved in 2016.

The interpretation of the acronym UFAM as meaning ‘Union Française des Artistes Musiciens’ (French Union of Music Artists), although historically incorrect, is particularly widespread.

Founded on the model of a charitable organisation with the aim of helping female instrumentalists and singers through the support of philanthropic patrons and mutual aid, the UFAM quickly turned its attention to organising concerts and later on prestigious international music competitions.

== History ==
The Union des Femmes Artistes Musiciennes (UFAM) was created in 1910 by Lucy Tassart (singer and socialite) and Privat de Séverac (composer and conductor) in response to the difficulties experienced by female musicians at the beginning of the 20th century. Although an increasing number of women were being trained in musical institutions, their professional integration was contested and they could only aspire to a very limited number of jobs. Orchestras, for example, did not open up any, or very few, positions to female musicians.

The UFAM's objective was to ‘assist female musicians in the most practical way possible’ by providing financial, medical and legal support to its members who requested it. It obtained the 'reconnu d’utilité publique' (recognised as being of public interest) status in France on 12 February 1914.

It follows in the footsteps of numerous professional unions structured at the dawn of the 20th century around mutualist principles, such as the Union of Women Painters and Sculptors (the first association of women artists in France, founded in 1881 with statutes similar to those later adopted by the UFAM) and the Union of Women Music Teachers and Composers (UFPC, founded in 1907).

Lucy Tassart (1863–1946) was the daughter of established journalist Victor Courbouleix (chairman of the board of the Gil Blas newspaper) and the wife of an influential magistrate Jules Tassart (vice-president of the Paris Court of Appeal and Chevalier of the Legion of Honour). She performed as a singer in various Parisian salons from the 1890s onwards and frequented the political, financial, artistic and feminist elites of the capital, notably attending suffragette conferences. The UFAM, created on her initiative, relied heavily on her network of contacts, and she remained its president until her death in 1946. Although Privat de Sévérac was the official founder of UFAM, his title was purely honorary: he did not take part in decisions and was not a member of its board. Organisations recognised of public interest could not officially be single-sex, and he acted as a male guarantor, which the female leaders needed in order to apply for grants and, more broadly, to exist in the charitable sector.

In 1942, UFAM decided to abandon the single-sex focus of its policy and open its annual competition, originally intended to promote young female talent, to men. UFAM was officially dissolved by decree on 13 May 2016.

== Aid for female musicians ==
The association's statutes detail the following support measures for female musicians:

1. Creation of a relief fund to help female musicians in need who have been members for at least three months.
2. Allocation of rent subsidies, after examination of applications submitted by the interested parties.
3. Compensation for the cost of a restful stay in the countryside for members whose state of health requires it (each year, the UFAM will send a certain number of members to the countryside free of charge).
4. Legal advice in the event of any disputes that may concern members.
5. Medical assistance.
6. Medicines.
7. Wardrobe (loan of evening dresses, stage costumes or teaching outfits).
8. Providing performance and teaching opportunities.
9. Creation of a retirement home (project completed in 1933. Following the death of a former benefactor, Mrs Parise, the UFAM was bequeathed an old house in Samoreau, Seine-et-Marne, which was renovated to become a retirement home capable of accommodating a few members for periodic stays).

When it was founded, the association had three categories of members: Benefactor Members (for patrons, both men and women), Honorary Members, and Professional Female Beneficiary Members (who paid an annual membership fee of 10 francs and had to prove their status as musicians in order to receive assistance).

== UFAM concerts ==
As patronage quickly proved insufficient to cover the expenses incurred in supporting its members, the UFAM decided to organise concerts, with ticket sales providing additional income.

It was in this context that the Union of Female Musician Artists' Orchestra and Choir was created in 1914, comprising up to 250 choristers and instrumentalists, all members of the UFAM, sometimes supported by additional male musicians. Although initially an ad hoc orchestra, it seems to have subsequently become a regular ensemble. From its creation until 1939, the UFAM gave nearly 80 choral-symphonic concerts, most frequently conducted by Georges de Lausnay (1882–1964). These concerts grew to become the UFAM's main source of income, but also its main expense.

Shortly after the creation of the Orchestra and Choir, also in 1914, the UFAM opened a music studio – a rehearsal and meeting place where members could get together as well as perform weekly in front of concert hall directors and socialites. This studio was located in the artist's studio of Victor Charpentier, brother of composer Gustave Charpentier, at 17 rue des Martyrs in Paris. Its existence is however no longer mentioned in the organizations' administrative documents after the end of the war in 1918.

Concentrated in western Paris, UFAM concerts were mainly held at the prestigious Salle Gaveau, although more modest performances, at which members performed in hopes of being noticed by concert organisers and patrons, were also organised in various hotels or at the UFAM Studio.

In 1923, a UFAM Conservatoire was created, with teachers recruited from among its members.

== UFAM international music and singing competitions ==
From the end of the Second World War until its dissolution, the UFAM devoted itself almost exclusively to organising its international music and singing competitions (created in the 1930s) as well as an annual concert in Paris featuring competition winners.

The UFAM's international competitions were held every year in Paris, with the aim of promoting young artists and helping them to launch their careers.

Throughout its history, UFAM has organised several competitions:

- Instrument competitions (at the beginning of the 21st century, the following disciplines were offered: guitar, violin, viola, cello, harp, clarinet, piano, jazz piano, trumpet, oboe, flute, saxophone, horn, trombone, piccolo, organ)
- The Paris International Chamber Music Competition
- The Paris International Singing Competition
- The International Ensemble Music Competition

For its instrument competitions, the UFAM regularly commissions contemporary composers to write new works. Many renowned classical soloists are former winners of UFAM competitions.
