= Marie-Pierre Langlamet =

- Born: September 13, 1967 (age 57); Grenoble, France
- Genres: Classical
- Occupation: Principal harpist of the Berlin Philharmonic
- Instrument: Harp

Marie-Pierre Langlamet (born September 13, 1967) is a French harpist.

== Early life and career ==
Langlamet was born in Grenoble. She studied at the Nice Conservatoire and began her career in her teens in the orchestra of the Opéra de Nice before continuing her studies at Curtis Institute of Music in Philadelphia. In 1988, she became deputy principal harpist at the Metropolitan Opera Orchestra in New York. Since 1993, she has been the principal harpist at the Berlin Philharmonic and has made many recordings with them.

== Repertoire ==
Langlamet collaborates with the American composer Sebastian Currier. She is noted as an exponent of the harp concerto by Alberto Ginastera. To mark the centenary of the composer's birth in 2016 she performed the work at several locations including the Philharmonie, Berlin.

== Honours ==
She has won several harp competitions including in 1992 first prize at the International Harp Contest in Israel.

In 2009, she was made a Chevalier de l’ordre des arts et des lettres by the French Ministry of Culture for her contribution to French music.
