= Anna Maria Mendieta =

American harpist

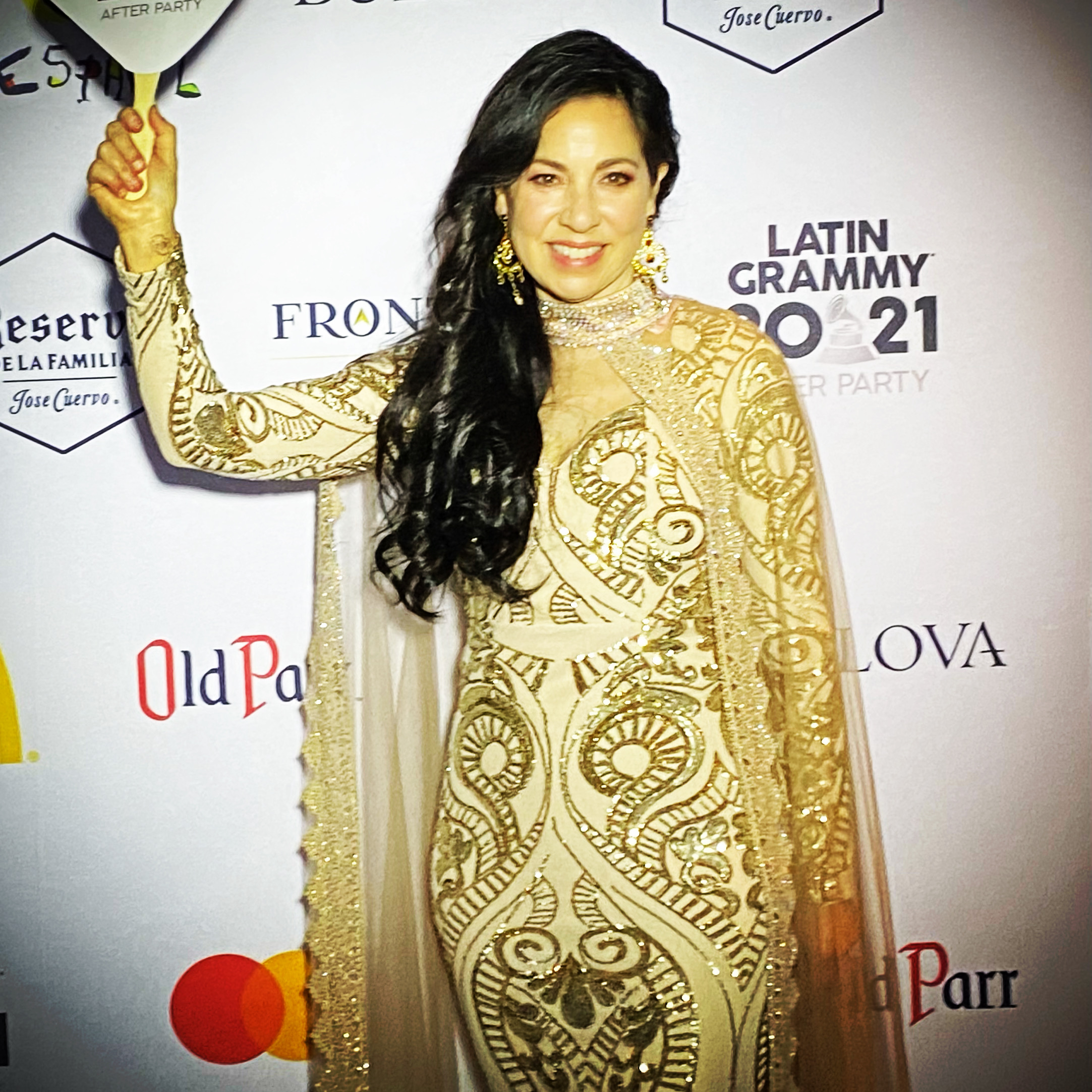
Anna Maria Mendieta seen at the 2021 Latin Grammy Awards

Anna Maria Mendieta is an American harpist. She is an orchestral musician serving as the principal harpist for the Sacramento Philharmonic & Opera, and is also a teacher.

She was recognized by the League of American Orchestras for being the first harpist to perform the first-ever Argentine tango concerto.

== Early life and education ==
Mendieta was born and raised in San Francisco, California to a Spanish and Latin American family. Her parents played a number of musical instruments and encouraged their children to study music, art, and dance. She began studying the harp at the age of seven using the Salzedo method at the San Francisco Conservatory of Music.

She continued her studies at San Francisco State University and at Stanford University and graduated with honors from Notre Dame de Namur University with a bachelor's degree in music. She has also studied privately with the San Francisco Symphony’s principal harpist Doug Rioth and with harpist Alice Chalifoux at the Salzedo Harp Colony in Camden, Maine.

== Career ==
Mendieta has also been featured as an instrumentalist for several seasons with Theater Flamenco of San Francisco.

She has performed with several symphony orchestras in the United States and internationally. Some of the ensembles she has worked with include:

- San Francisco Symphony
- San Francisco Opera
- San Francisco Ballet
- Russian National Orchestra
- Russian State Ballet

=== Harp-Tango project ===
In the 1990s, Mendieta became fascinated with Argentine tango but discovered that there was no music for the harp. Argentine tradition had kept classical instruments, like the harp, largely separate from the genre. Mendieta created her own arrangements and invented a new technique, one that allowed the harp to execute the difficult chromatic passages and percussive effects characteristic of tango music.

She was influenced by Nuevo Tango— a sub-genre that combined tango, jazz, and modern classical, developed by Astor Piazzolla.

Mendieta also studied tango dance. Her "Harp-Tango" project has evolved into a multimedia touring concert-show called "Tango Del Cielo", which presents a fusion of tango and flamenco with a tribute to the silent films. Tango Del Cielo was the featured show at the 2019 World Tango Festival in Victoria, Canada.

The Tango Del Cielo for Harp & Orchestra has won 9 international awards, including 4 Global Music Awards, and reached #2 on Billboard's Classical Crossover Charts.

== Awards and honors ==
Global Music Awards - Anna Maria Mendieta - Tango Del Cielo Album 2022 Bronze Medal for Best Music Video "Oblivion" (with filmmaker Cristian Pablo Ardito, Libres Del Mundo Productions) 2021 Silver Medalist for Best Album "Tango Del Cielo" 2021 Silver Medal - Best Instrumentalist 2021 Silver Medal - Editing & Mixing "Tango Del Cielo" Album

Clouzine International Music Awards 2022 - Best Music Video "Oblivion" (with filmmaker Cristian Pablo Ardito, Libres Del Mundo Productions) 2020 Best Classical Crossover Album - "Tango Del Cielo" Album 2020 Best Music Video "Libertango" (Libres Del Mundo Productions)

LIT International Talent Awards 2021 Most Artistic Music Video "Oblivion" 2021 Best Show "Tango Del Cielo"

2013 American Harp Society Grant Commission recipient for a concerto to be composed for her.

Mendieta is the only harpist to have twice received the "Matz Memorial Award" from Lyon & Healy Harp Company for "Outstanding Achievement".

== Notable performances ==
Played for:

- President Bill Clinton
- President Mikhail Gorbachev
- King Juan Carlos and Queen Sophia of Spain
- NFL 2022 Super Bowl VIP Pre-game Event
- George Lucas
- Pope Benedict XV
- Colin Powell
- George Shultz
- Francis Ford Coppola
- Lindsay Wagner
- Featured instrumentalist - Theater Flamenco of San Francisco
- 2006 American Harp Society National Harp Conference.
- National Hispanic Week in Washington D.C.
- Spoleto Festival
- The Central Intelligence Agency

Celebrity Concert Performances:

- Andrea Bocelli
- Josh Groban
- Frank Sinatra Jr.
- Olivia Newton-John
- Fernando de la Mora
- Barry Manilow
- Johnny Mathis
- Moody Blues
- Frederica Von Stade
- John Denver
- Charlotte Church

== Discography ==
Release date	Album	Label
October 27, 1993	Enchanted Christmas – Harp & New Chamber Ensemble	Sugo Records
November 19, 1996	Broadway Center Stage	Sugo Records
October 10, 1998	An Acoustic Christmas	Sugo Records
November 9, 1999	Christmas Angels: A Sugo Holiday Collection (by various artists)	Sugo Records
August 21, 2020	Tango Del Cielo	Anna Maria Mendieta (self-published)

Also featured on: "Around the World" National Geographic Music Series – "Serenity, Songs of Peace and Enlightenment" (National Geographic & Sugo Music Label) Musae - Women's Ensemble "Songs of the Southwest" Pacific Boy Choir - "O Holy Night" (2012) Rejoice! - The Young Women's Chorus of San Francisco (2016) Titanes Del Trombones - Doug Beavers, Trombone (2018 Grammy Winner)
