= Florence Wightman =

American harpist

Florence Wightman was an American harpist of the 20th century. She began her orchestral career in Philadelphia theaters, and then served as Principal Harp for the Cleveland Orchestra, making her the first woman to hold a principal position in the USA, though for only one season. She departed Cleveland to serve as Principal Harp for the Roxy Theater Orchestra in New York City. She later played for the NBC Radio Symphony Orchestra, and served as Principal Harp for the Metropolitan Opera, while simultaneously performing weekly solo recital programs on several national radio networks.

After an early retirement from the Metropolitan Opera, she continued performing for several opera companies, including the Lyric Opera of Chicago, in Montreal under Leonard Pelletier, and in Bogota. She was recorded performing in Wonder Tidings, a Christmas work by the composer John LaMontaine for solo harp, choir and narrator. There are also historic recordings of her playing in the library of the American Harp Society. She participated in the Memorial Concert for Carlos Salzedo, produced by Gerald Goodman, which took place in New York's Town Hall in 1962, the recording of which was released in limited distribution. On it she performs Salzedo's Sonata for Harp and Piano.

Wightman began music study on the piano, then became a harp student of the famed teacher, Carlos Salzedo, and served as his assistant instructor at the Curtis Institute of Music in Philadelphia, before embarking on her orchestral and solo career. The harpist, Edna Phillips (Rosenbaum) was her protégée, later becoming Principal Harp of the Philadelphia Orchestra.
