= Ann Hobson Pilot =

American harpist

- Born: November 6, 1943 (age 82); Philadelphia, Pennsylvania, US
- Occupation: Musician
- Years active: 1966–2009
- Musical career
- Instruments: Harp

Ann Hobson Pilot (born November 6, 1943) is an American musician and the former principal harpist of the Boston Symphony Orchestra and the Boston Pops. She has performed with the National Symphony Orchestra, the Pittsburgh Symphony, and as a soloist with many orchestras in the United States. She was one of four African American musicians who were the first to play in United States symphony orchestras during the 1960s.

== Biography ==
Ann Hobson was born on November 6, 1943, in Philadelphia, Pennsylvania, in an African American family. Her mother was a concert pianist.

She began studying the harp when she was 14. Though she achieved a concert caliber by her senior year of high school, she encountered obstacles due to her race early on. The Maine Harp Colony rejected her application to study there during the summer because of her race. Following her graduation from the Philadelphia Girls High, she was able to attend the Maine Harp Colony, where she met pioneering woman harpist Alice Chalifoux.

After returning from Maine, Hobson studied at the Philadelphia Musical Academy. She later transferred to the Cleveland Institute of Music where she could study with Chalifoux. She received a Bachelor of Music degree there.

Hobson was selected to play as master harpist in the National Symphony Orchestra in 1966, its first black member, replacing Sylvia Meyer. She continued with the National Symphony till 1969.

Hobson was the second harpist with the Pittsburgh Symphony before joining the Boston Symphony Orchestra in 1969 as Assistant Principal Harp and Principal Harp of the Boston Pops. She was named Principal Harpist of the BSO in 1980.

In addition to solo appearances with the BSO and Boston Pops, she has appeared as a soloist with many American orchestras. She has played at the Marlboro Festival, with the Boston Symphony Chamber Players and the contemporary music ensemble Collage, and is the founder of the New England Harp Trio. Honors she has received include Sigma Alpha Iota’s Distinguished Woman of the Year Award in 1991, the Philadelphia College of Performing Arts School of Music Alumni Achievement Award in 1992, and the Distinguished Alumni Award from the Cleveland Institute of Music in 1993. In addition to New England Conservatory, Pilot is on the faculty at Boston University, Tanglewood Music Center, and the Boston University Tanglewood Institute.

Pilot retired from her position as harpist of the Boston Symphony in 2009, ending a 40-year career in the orchestra.

Besides her concert career, Pilot was also a music teacher. She taught at the New England Conservatory from 1973 to 2013.

In 2020, she delivered a TED (conference) Talk: "A Black Harpist's Story".
