= Harp Concerto (Ginastera) =

1956 composition by Alberto Ginastera

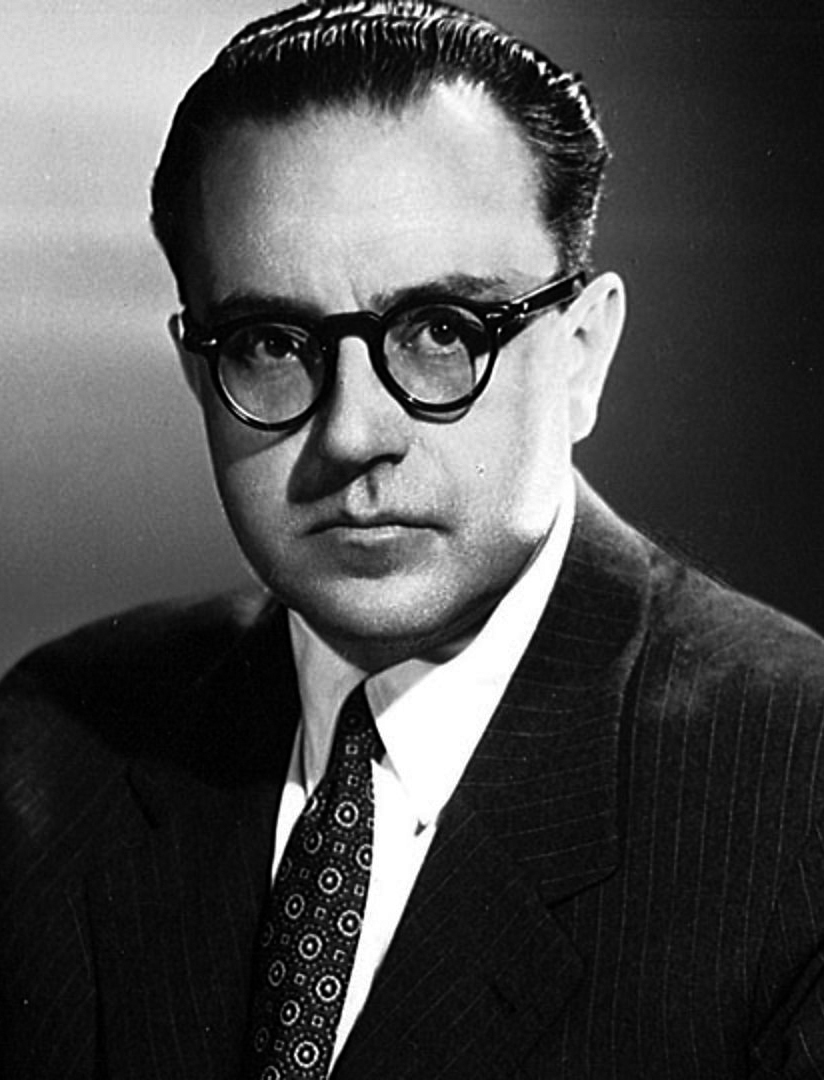
Alberto Ginastera

The Harp Concerto by Alberto Ginastera was composed in 1956 and first performed in 1965. The concerto was commissioned by Edna Phillips, the harpist of the Philadelphia Orchestra. Phillips had retired by the time the work was ready to be premiered, so the solo part was played by the Spanish harpist Nicanor Zabaleta with the Philadelphia Orchestra, conducted by Eugene Ormandy.

Harpist Heidi Lehwalder began performing the concerto by the 1970s and performed it with nearly every professional orchestra in the United States, sometimes more than once and sometimes several times. She established it as standard repertoire, almost de rigueur for aspiring soloists. By 1985, it was the most-performed work by Ginastera, making him one of the top earners for its publisher, Boosey & Hawkes.

2016, the centenary of the composer's birth, saw a number of performances including one by the French harpist Marie-Pierre Langlamet and the Berlin Philharmonic conducted by Juanjo Mena.

== Background ==
At the time of composition in 1958, Ginastera was in a period he described as "Subjective Nationalism", and nationalism for him meant the use and incorporation of Argentine folk elements. While the guitar is the instrument most associated with Spain, Central and South America today, it was not always so. The harp was the instrument par excellence of the Spanish Renaissance and early Baroque periods, introduced extensively to the New World by the missionaries, and folk harps remain an integral part of traditional music across Latin America. As such, Ginastera was able to incorporate elements of both traditional aesthetics and Latin American harp into his work.

== Music ==
The concerto has three movements:

1. Allegro giusto
2. Molto moderato
3. Liberamente capriccioso – Vivace

It is scored for the following instruments:

Woodwinds

2 flutes (flute 2 doubling piccolo)
2 oboes
2 clarinets in B♭
2 bassoons

Brass
2 horns in F
2 trumpets in C

Percussion

timpani

tambourine
field drum
cymbals
xylophone
celesta
various Latin percussion instruments

Strings
harp

violin I
violin II
violas
cellos
double basses

== See also ==
- List of compositions for harp

== Sources ==
- Ginastera, Alberto. "Harp Concerto. Op. 25." (Boosey & Hawkes, 1974).
