= Carlos Salzedo =

French musician, composer and conductor

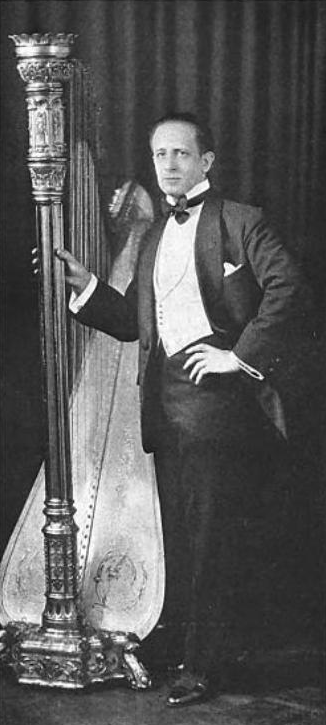
- In Musical Advance, July 1924
- Born: Charles Moïse Léon Salzedo; 6 April 1885; Arcachon, France
- Died: 17 August 1961 (aged 76); Waterville, Maine, US
- Education: Paris Conservatory
- Occupations: Harpist, pianist, composer
- Spouses: Viola Gramm (m. 1914; div. 1926) Lucile Lawrence (m. 1928; div. 1936) Marjorie Call (m. 1937; div. 1947)

Charles Moïse Léon Salzedo (6 April 1885 – 17 August 1961) was a French harpist, pianist, composer and conductor. His compositions presented the harp as a virtuoso instrument. He influenced many composers with his new ideas for the harp's sounds, and was influential in New York's new music scene through his work leading the International Composers' Guild with Edgard Varèse.

Salzedo began studying at the Paris Conservatory at age nine and won the premier prix in harp and piano when he was just 16. He started his solo recital career at age 18, and was brought to the United States of America six years later, to perform as solo harpist with the Metropolitan Opera House in New York City. He toured extensively with the Trio de Lutèce, with Georges Barrère, flute and Paul Kéfer, cello. After being drafted into the French Army during World War I, Salzedo returned to the United States and continued touring with the trio.

In consultation with Vaslav Nijinsky during a summer in Maine, together they developed a system of esthetic gestures to be used while performing on the harp. Subsequently, he was instrumental in raising money to save Nijinsky by funding his residence in a Swiss Sanatorium. Aside from touring with his trio, he organized The Salzedo Harp Ensemble, utilizing his students, which toured extensively, often in collaboration with singers from the Metropolitan Opera.

He co-founded the International Composers' Guild with Edgard Varèse in 1921, and founded the National Harp Association to promote the harp. In addition to forming a summer harp colony, first in Seal Harbor, then later in Camden, Maine, he founded the harp department at the Curtis Institute of Music in 1924. He continued to teach privately in New York City until his death. He developed new techniques and notations for these techniques, which he used extensively in his compositions after 1919.

== Early life and education ==
Carlos Salzedo was born Charles Moïse Léon Salzedo on 6 April 1885, in Arcachon, France. Salzedo's parents, Isaac Gaston Salzedo and Thérèse Judith Anna Silva, who resided in Bayonne, were vacationing in Arcachon when Mme. Salzedo fell down a flight of stairs, causing the two-month premature birth of Salzedo. Both parents were of noted Sephardic (Iberian Jewish) families and fine musicians, he a singer, she a pianist. Their first child, Marcel, became a violinist, and military band leader in Paris, and later in Côte d'Azur. During this time, Mme. Salzedo was employed as the summer-court pianist to Queen Mother Maria Christina in Biarritz. Young Léon-Charles played the piano for Maria Christina at the age of three, which led her to dub him "my little Mozart."

Salzedo's mother died just two years later when he was five. The family then moved to Bordeaux and a Basque woman, Marthe Tatibouet Bidebérripé, was hired to care for and help raise the children. Salzedo became deeply attached to her, and liked to think of himself as being culturally Basque. Some writers have attributed his fondness for five-beat rhythms to Basque traditions where they are often used. Léon-Charles, having begun playing piano by the age of three, wrote his first composition, a polka called Moustique (Mosquito), which was published when he was just five years old. Though lost, the theme reappeared in the Polka of his Suite of Eight Dances. At seven, he entered the St. Cecilia School of Music of Bordeaux, where he won first prize in piano and solfège three years later, after which the family moved to Paris. Léon-Charles entered the Paris Conservatory at age nine, where he again won prizes in piano and solfège. He continued his piano studies with Charles de Bériot, son of the renowned violinist Charles de Bériot and a pupil of Thalberg.

Salzedo's father, by then a respected voice teacher, decided Salzedo should take up a second instrument, and the harp was chosen because he was felt to be too weak to play a wind instrument, and his older brother Marcel already played the violin. Beginners were not accepted at the Conservatoire, so Carlos took lessons from a chanced-upon teacher, Marguerite Achard. After a few months, he had advanced enough that he was accepted as a pupil by Alphonse Hasselmans, professor of harp at the Conservatoire. After a year of study with Hasselmans, he entered the Conservatoire as a fully fledged harp pupil at the age of thirteen. In 1901, at age sixteen, Salzedo won the premier prix in harp and piano on the same day, an accomplishment unmatched to this day, and was awarded a Steinway grand piano. While a student, Salzedo freelanced as second harpist in the Orchestre Lamoureux as well as the orchestras of the Olympia theater and the Folies Bergère. The director of the Conservatoire, Gabriel Fauré, approved Salzedo for a counterpoint class after he wrote a Bach fugue from memory.

When Salzedo graduated, he was hired as a solo harpist, first orchestral harpist, and solo pianist at the New Casino in Biarritz under conductor/composer Piero Luigini. The following winter he toured Europe with the Concerts Colonne orchestra, followed by solo appearances as pianist and harpist with that orchestra. He made his Paris recital debut at age 18 as a harpist and pianist, in 1903, for which occasion he decided to change his name to Carlos from Léon-Charles Moise. About this time, a stroke paralyzed Gaston Salzedo, who handed over his position as synagogue music director to young Carlos. Salzedo also toured in solo performances around Europe, receiving glowing praise in the papers.

== America, first marriage, and war ==
In 1909, Arturo Toscanini invited Salzedo, via an agent, to play in the orchestra of the Metropolitan Opera House in New York City, and so Carlos left France for the United States of America, not knowing any English. Salzedo became a member of musical society, where he was often invited to soirees such as those held by Alice Ditson. It was at such a soiree that Salzedo was introduced to Viola Gramm, a respected pianist and singer. They became romantically involved, traveled through the château country of France in 1913, and then were married on 30 April 1914, in New York City. Salzedo wrote a wedding cantata for the occasion, which was performed by his friends. Gramm was often referred to as "Mimine", Salzedo's pet name for her.

After resigning from his position at the opera in 1913, Salzedo formed the "Trio de Lutèce" with Georges Barrère on flute and Paul Kéfer on cello, which toured extensively in the United States. The trio was scheduled to play in England, so Salzedo and Mimine took the opportunity to honeymoon in Europe; in England, they were introduced to various members of the nobility. When World War I began, they moved to Menthon-Saint-Bernard (in the Rhône-Alpes region) to have more time together, but Salzedo was soon drafted into the French Army.

Salzedo was made head cook for his infantry unit, and happened to be in the same unit as several painters and musicians. He had a sympathetic leader, and was able to organize them into a performing group that sang for soldiers and toured hospitals, for which he arranged traditional French folk songs. He got an extended leave to see Mimine, but when he returned, a new captain was in charge who did not permit musical activities. Salzedo became seriously ill with pneumonia and a form of paralysis, for which he was hospitalized for several months before being finally discharged from the army. In order to get passports (which had not been necessary in 1914) to leave France, Salzedo and Mimine had to prove their identities by marrying a second time in Paris in August 1915.

During this early period of his adult life, he was very active in musical high society and high society otherwise. He neighbored the Rockefellers at Seal Harbor, Maine. He counted among his musical friends Edgard Varèse, Josef Hoffmann, Leopold Stokowski and Ossip Gabrilowitsch. He was sought after for performances at social occasions where he could be quite the life of the party.

=== Return to America ===
On the Salzedos' return to the US in 1916, Carlos reunited with the Trio de Lutèce. Salzedo and Mimine began spending summers in Seal Harbor, where Salzedo became friends with Vaslav Nijinsky, the legendary Russian dancer, with whom he developed a series of esthetic gestures for playing the harp that became an essential part of the Salzedo Method for the harp. In 1918 he formed the Salzedo Harp Ensemble, which was made up of his students. The group was very popular and played for a week at the Capitol Theatre in New York in 1920. He organized the Salzedo Harp Trio in 1919 with Marie Miller and Elsie Sorelle. The Trio de Lutèce was reformed in 1932, with Horace Britt as cellist instead of Paul Kéfer. Bernard Wagenaar wrote a Triple Concerto for the trio, which they premiered. One critic said it was a "piece of convenience", while fellow composers praised the work's strength and personality. The Trio performed all over North America, including in Mexico and Canada. The Trio toured regularly until 1937, when Barrère joined the Barrère-Britt Concertino, as it was impractical to travel with a harp.

From the 1920s onward, Salzedo appeared as a soloist with many orchestras. He performed as a soloist with the Philadelphia Orchestra, the Boston Symphony Orchestra, the Metropolitan Opera Orchestra, the New York Symphony Orchestra, the Chicago Symphony Orchestra, the Detroit Symphony Orchestra, the Cleveland Orchestra, the Syracuse Symphony Orchestra, the Rochester Philharmonic Orchestra, the Kansas City Little Symphony, the Boston Philharmonic Orchestra, the Friends of Music (New York), and with multiple choruses. He performed with chamber music societies including the Pittsfield Festival, the International Composers' Guild, the Beethoven Association, the New York Chamber Symphony Orchestra, and the Letz Quartet. Salzedo returned to France in 1925 and 1930, performing concerts each time. During his 1925 visit, he went to London to give the first live broadcast harp recital over the BBC. His last visit to France was for two weeks in 1959, on his way to Israel to judge the first International Harp Contest.

== Music groups and fundraising ==
Salzedo was involved in many arenas, including the burgeoning "new music" circles in New York, where he co-founded the International Composers Guild with Edgard Varèse in 1921. The Guild presented the most prominent European composers and others in concert, figures such as Bartók and Honegger. Two wealthy patrons ensured the finances of the guild, while Salzedo conducted many of the concerts. Louise Varèse, Edgard's wife, wrote the program notes. Volunteers and friends helped with publicity mailings and other secretarial work. In 1927, Varèse ended the guild's concerts, stating that the goals of the guild had been met and it was becoming more common for concerts to feature living composers.

Salzedo became the chairman of the National Association of Harpists in 1919, and was the editor-in-chief of its publication until 1933. He was also the president of the National Association of Harpists in 1920 and during his presidency, he organized large harp ensembles in their annual festivals. By 1933 the National Association of Harpists was no longer active. Salzedo founded the Franco-American Musical Society with E. Robert Schmitz in 1920, and was its vice president in 1924. In 1923 Salzedo was a board member for the International Society for Contemporary Music and served as vice-president for a time. In 1928 he helped organize the Pan American Society of Composers, a society for promoting Latin American music. In 1925, Henry Cowell made Salzedo an honorary member of the New Music Society of California's endorsement board.

Salzedo raised money to buy a pipe organ in Seal Harbor, with matching funds from John D. Rockefeller, and later, was most notably able to raise sufficient funds to aid Vaslav Nijinsky and his family to escape into safety in Switzerland.

== Teaching ==
Salzedo based his teaching technique on the aesthetics of arm movement, focusing on the movements of specific body parts. He taught that a harpist's elbows should be parallel to each other and the floor, and that a true legato was impossible on the harp. Nijinski once commented that Salzedo's hands "explain the music before the music starts." From subsequent discussions with Nijinski, Salzedo developed principles of gesture for harpists that enhance listeners' enjoyment. Salzedo also paid special attention to fingerings and pedal markings on the harp music, to the extent that harp composers started to include finger and pedal markings in their scores. Mariette Bitter described his charisma as a teacher: "He could bewitch a young harpist with his charm and understanding inside of a half hour, even though she knew and felt his iron will was lurking underneath."

At Josef Hoffman's invitation, Salzedo founded the harp department at the Curtis Institute of Music in 1924. He also taught at Juilliard School until 1937. An average of thirty-five harpists populated the harp colony during each summer in Camden, which started in 1931. Some studied with Salzedo while others studied with other harp teachers. Salzedo's students had two or three lessons per week. As its popularity increased, up to 300 harpists would come to the colony in a single summer. Salzedo was teaching at Camden until his death in 1961, after which Alice Chalifoux took over as head of the colony.

== Composing ==
Salzedo began composing at a young age. When he was twenty-five, he started composing significantly, with Fauré stating that his "Piece Concertante, Opus 27" was promising. In 1917, he wrote Five Preludes for Harp Alone, which broke entirely new musical ground in harp writing. He followed with Five Poetical Studies in 1918, which were dedicated to the memory of Claude Debussy, and exemplified his Impressionist musical style. Also in 1918, he composed a symphonic poem, The Enchanted Isle, for harp and orchestra. Shelley Archambo characterizes the works from 1910 to 1918 period as impressionistic.

Salzedo included the Five Poetical Studies in his Modern Study of the Harp (1919), where he introduced his notation system for indicating his specific tone colors. One technique, con sordino, requires harpists to mute strings with a strip of paper interlaced between the strings. A crescent shape over notes indicates that they should be played with fingernails. Square notes indicate that the harpist should press on the string with one hand and pluck with the other, giving it a sound like a xylophone. Rapid glissandos are represented with arrows in the vertical lines of notes, and "L.V" instructs harpists to "let vibrate". Salzedo collaborated with Lucile Lawrence to write Method for Harp (1927), where he furthered his notations using specific techniques like these. Archambo calls Salzedo's post-1919 compositions part of Salzedo's "mature period" and writes that, aside from his pedagogical pieces, melodies are not supported by traditional harmonies, but are accompanied by sound clusters. Archambo states that Salzedo's main goal in composing was to "make available to the harpist and contemporary composer every possible sound and effect on the instrument."

Salzedo wrote Four Preludes to the Afternoon of a Telephone (1921) based on the telephone numbers of four of his students. He stated that he composed Concerto for Harp and Seven Wind Instruments (1926) because contemporary repertoire lacked a harp concerto. He dedicated the composition to Lucile Lawrence. Pentacle was a suite of five pieces for two harps, which the Milwaukee Senetinel described as "ultra-modern" in 1931. Elizabeth Sprague Coolidge commissioned Salzedo to write a piece for harp and chamber orchestra; Preamble et Jeux premiered in 1929. In The New York Times, Henry Prunières said the work had "extraordinary refinement, delicate explorations in sonority, and nice balancing in timbre" while Herman Devries, writing for the Chicago American wrote it was "just another of those modern things." In 1932, Salzedo arranged Manuel de Falla's Seven Popular Songs for two harps and voice, specifically for Nina Kochetz to sing with. Using the note-alphabet correspondence he developed for Olga's name piece, Salzedo composed songs for his students as wedding presents. These pieces are called Wedding Presents. He composed Diptych, Two Pieces for Right Hand Alone (1950) for a student who injured her hand. The themes for the pieces were based on her name. During this time he mostly composed small pieces and arrangements.

In 1953, Salzedo wrote his Second Concerto for Harp and Orchestra, but he did not complete the orchestration for it before his death in 1961. The harp part and piano score reduction were published by Don Henry at Lyra Music Company. The orchestration was completed by Robert Russell Bennett. On 28 March 1982, Jennifer Hoult performed the world premiere of the concerto with the American Chamber Orchestra under the baton of Charles Barker. The live recording of this performance is part of the sound recordings collection in the Library of Congress.

== Personal life ==
In the 1920s, Salzedo and Mimine began to grow apart, as she was spending more time in Rome, and Carlos was spending more time with teaching, recitals, and "lightly concealed liaisons." They had an amicable divorce in 1926, remaining lifelong friends, and in 1928 Salzedo married Lucile Lawrence, a student of his for the past ten years who had developed into a virtuoso player. The two were married for eight years. A year after their divorce in 1937, Salzedo married Marjorie Call, another student of his. Call and Salzedo divorced in 1947. Owens writes that Salzedo constantly appeared in public with a young woman, often a favorite student, and that "it was simply a matter of fact that he was a 'faithless husband.'" In her biography of Barrère, Nancy Toff wrote that Salzedo could be "caustic, superior, and disagreeable"; Barrère often apologized to others on Salzedo's behalf.

== Death and legacy ==
Salzedo died on 17 August 1961 in Waterville, Maine, at the age of 76, while adjudicating Metropolitan Opera regional auditions at Bates College. Lucile Lawrence inherited most of his music, papers, correspondence and property.

Salzedo's performances, compositions, and arrangements brought prestige to harp technique and literature. He composed specifically for the harp, in a way that showed how specialized harp music is. He introduced new notations for indicating certain harp techniques, colors, and effects. His compositions made the harp into a virtuoso instrument. He influenced many composers with his new ideas for the harp's sounds through his work with the International Composers' Guild. Stravinsky used muffled harp chords and notes plucked near the sounding-board in his Symphony of Psalms. Schoenberg used flat-handed chords in his Variations for Orchestra (1929). Bartók also used them along with chromatic octaves in Music for Strings, Percussion and Celesta (1936). Benjamin Britten's The Young Person's Guide to the Orchestra used all of Salzedo's published harp techniques. Other works to include Salzedo's techniques are Variations for Orchestra by Elliott Carter and Alberto Ginastera's Harp Concerto. Sergei Prokofiev, Darius Milhaud, Anton Webern, Paul Hindemith, and Ernst Krenek all wrote for the harp in ways that used Salzedo's techniques. Most composers explained the techniques in the music rather than using Salzedo's notation, because no single source compiled the effects and their notations. Specialized harp symbols were not common until 1960. Luciano Berio, Jose Serebier, Richard Felciano, and Robert Capanna used special symbols for harp techniques, with some similar or identical to Salzedo's.

Salzedo's students numbered in the hundreds. Many continue to perform in symphony orchestras including the Philadelphia, Milwaukee, New Jersey and other symphony orchestras, and formerly occupied the Principal chairs in a great many American orchestras, as well as teaching positions at conservatories and universities. A brief list of some of the most notable students of Salzedo includes Florence Wightman, Casper Reardon, Lucile Lawrence, Sylvia Meyer, Edna Phillips, Alice Chalifoux, Lynne Wainwright Palmer, Reinhardt Elster, Marjorie Tyre, Edward Druzinsky, Beatrice Schroeder Rose, Marilyn Costello, Margarita Montanaro, Judy Loman, and Heidi Lehwalder.

Salzedo took a great interest in harp design, and worked with Lyon & Healy in Chicago to produce Salzedo model harps. These harps had an extra 1/8 inch spacing between notes in the middle register to reduce buzzing. Forty Salzedo harps were made from 1931 to 1954. New "Salzedo" harps had started production again sometime in the early 1980s and were in production in 2023.

== Pedagogical publications ==
In alphabetical order:

- The Art of Modulating, Carlos Salzedo with Lucile Lawrence (Schirmer), containing text on improvisation, sight-reading and modulating in commercial music, with original compositions by Salzedo
- Conditioning Exercises, Carlos Salzedo (Schirmer)
- The Harpist's Daily Dozen (exercises), Carlos Salzedo (Schirmer, Lyra)
- Method for the Harp, Lawrence/Salzedo (Schirmer), containing the music Preludes for Beginners by Salzedo, and tone colors with notation, with photos and text by Lawrence
- Modern Study of the Harp, Carlos Salzedo (Schirmer) with tone colors and text in English and French, and Five Poetical Studies, music
- Pathfinder to the Harp, containing Pathfinder Studies Lawrence/Salzedo (Peer-Southern); according to collaborator Lucile Lawrence, Salzedo contributed the music for "Conflict" and reviewed the remainder prior to publication, but "accepted" a composer credit for all the pieces, the remainder of which were actually composed by Lucile Lawrence

== Bibliography ==
- Archambo, Shelley Batt (1984). Carlos Salzedo (1885–1961): The Harp in Transition. University of Kansas.
- Bernstein, Adam (30 March 2005). "Esteemed NSO Harpist Sylvia Meyer". The Washington Post.
- Bitter, Marietta (2010). Pentacle: The Story of Carlos Salzedo and the Harp (1st ed.). Lake Tapps, Washington: Salzedo Committee of the American Harp Society. ISBN 9781456336660.
- "It's All in the Family". Harp Column. 1 July 2014.
- "Lynne Wainwright Palmer". Harp Society. 2010. Archived from the original on 9 March 2018.
- Owens, Dewey (1992). Carlos Salzedo: From Aeolian to Thunder. Chicago, Illinois: Lyon & Healy.
- "Salzedo – Professional Pedal Harps – Lyon & Healy Harps". Lyon & Healy Harps.
- Toff, Nancy (2005). Monarch of the Flute: The Life of Georges Barrère (online ed.). Oxford [and elsewhere]: Oxford University Press. ISBN 9780195170160.
