= Edna Phillips =

American harpist (1907–2003)

Edna Phillips (January 7, 1907 – December 2, 2003), later Edna Phillips Rosenbaum (though she never changed her professional name and was still known as "Miss Phillips"), was an American harpist long associated with the Philadelphia Orchestra and a teacher at the Philadelphia Conservatory of Music. Her most lasting contribution to the instrument was a body of works she commissioned as a soloist, including the concertos of Alberto Ginastera, Nicolai Berezowsky, Ernst Krenek, and Ernst von Dohnányi.

== Early life ==
Phillips was born on January 7, 1907, in Reading, Pennsylvania, where she learned to play the piano and the violin. At the age of seventeen she began harp study with Florence Wightman. Miss Wightman was a student of Carlos Salzedo at the recently established Curtis Institute of Music in Philadelphia. She was his teaching assistant as well. When Phillips moved to Philadelphia two years later, she continued her private lessons with Miss Wightman, and audited lessons and harp classes at Curtis. When Miss Wightman was hired by Manhattan's famous Roxy Theater to play in their orchestra, she took Phillips along to be her second harpist. However, Phillips grew so uncomfortable with the racy theatrical atmosphere and the routine music that she returned to Philadelphia after six weeks.

Phillips auditioned for study at Curtis, playing the harp and the piano, and was accepted by Mr. Salzedo, partly on the strength of her piano playing, and she enrolled in the fall of 1927. As a first-year student, she had her private lessons with Salzedo's newly appointed Associate Instructor, Lucile Lawrence. It is worth noting that in that year, Salzedo had twelve students and Miss Lawrence had another six, including Alice Chalifoux. In following years the studio maintained ten to twelve students, in contrast to the total of four enrolled in more–recent years at Curtis and several other American conservatories.

In the fall of 1928, Phillips began her private lessons with Salzedo. Her summers were spent in Maine where his harp colony was located; first in Seal Harbor and then in Camden, where it remained until its closure in 2002. With Phillips's strong piano background and innate musicality, she made swift progress. In 1930 (just her fifth year of playing the harp), it was arranged by Salzedo and Lawrence for her to audition at their apartment for Leopold Stokowski, the already famous conductor of the Philadelphia Orchestra, for the Second Harp position. To her surprise–and Salzedo's–she was appointed Principal Harp instead, at the age of twenty-two.

== Solo career ==
Phillips performed that year as soloist with the Reading Symphony Orchestra, on February 23, 1930. She played the Debussy Deux Danses: Sacree et Profane and, as an encore, Carlos Salzedo's virtuoso piece Whirlwind. In the newspaper the Reading Eagle, the reviewer wrote the following of the concert:

Two Debussy numbers, "Danse Sacree" and "Danse Profane," were played by Miss Phillips, harpist. Accompanied by a string ensemble from the orchestra, the dances were played with rare skill and interpretation. Typical of Debussy's style, especially the "Danse Profane," the nuances of the latter are characteristic of the French composer. Changes occur from a mood of dreamlike meditation to the sprightly devilish antics of a frightened faun, with a suddenness that is breathtaking. The "Danse Sacree" was beautiful in its delicate solemnity, typifying the ancient Greek form of dance in procession through a lofty and majestic cathedral, and suggesting the refrain of chimes in the distance.

Miss Phillips was enthusiastically recalled for an encore and played "The Whirlwind," by Carlos Salzedo. The piece is characteristic of its name, and suggests a tornado, sweeping chaos and turmoil in its path. Technically a difficult composition, it was played by the harpist with a poise and assurance that be-tokened an unusual mastery of the dynamics of her instrument. The ensemble numbers evidenced her intelligent and sympathetic understanding of orchestral effects, which charmed the appreciative audience. The grace and beauty of her performance was enhanced by the use of lovely gestures, an innovation in harp playing which added a pleasing symmetry to the entire effect.

In the next year Phillips would record the Debussy with Stokowski, with only two days' notice to prepare. (This recording has been re-released on the Biddulph label [WHL 013] Stokowski Conducts French Orchestral Favorites, Volume Three.)

== Philadelphia Orchestra ==
As a member of the Philadelphia Orchestra, Phillips was thrown into a grueling schedule of performing and recording, everything from Bach to Schoenberg, many in Stokowski's orchestrations, which he would revise on the spot in rehearsals, as well as the latest contemporary scores. She had to learn how to sight-read anything. She performed as a member of the orchestra from 1930 to 1946, with Marjorie Tyre as second harpist. Phillips was the first woman in the orchestra, and as a newspaper headline noted, she "added a feminine touch to the right hand front of the ensemble." (Stokowski generally preferred to place the harp at the front of the stage, near the double-basses, or sometimes on the left.) In 1937, one of many times Phillips performed as soloist with the Philadelphia Orchestra, she played the Chorale et Variations by Charles Widor. The Philadelphia Ledger recorded on March 16, that she "played superbly Widor's beautiful Chorale and Variations for harp and orchestra. She showed beautiful tone quality, ample volume and a fluent technique, which the work demands, as it nearly exhausts the possibilities of the harp. The audience tried hard for an encore number but was disappointed." Following the text is a list of all the performances in which she appeared as soloist with the Philadelphia Orchestra.

== Sabbatical ==
She took a sabbatical year in 1941–42, and Lynne Wainwright (Palmer) and Reba Robinson filled in. During her year off, Phillips concertized and gave the world premiere of her commission Sea Chanty by Paul White. She premiered this work with the Rochester (N.Y.) Philharmonic under the baton of the famous Jose Iturbi, and later recorded it for Columbia Records with Eugene Ormandy conducting. After 1946, she often returned to the orchestra to substitute and help out, and is possibly the harpist on the soundtrack of the film Louisiana Story, with its well-known musical score by Virgil Thomson.

== Teaching ==
Phillips began teaching in 1932 at the Philadelphia Conservatory of Music, remaining there until 1972. When Carlos Salzedo died in 1961, she was offered his position at Curtis, but turned it down in favor of Marilyn Costello, her successor in the Philadelphia Orchestra. She taught and coached students privately, and helped develop many of Philadelphia's harpists, notably including Karin Fuller. When she left the Philadelphia Orchestra, she plunged into community work. She founded the Germantown Branch of the Settlement Music School for which she served as president and board member (a community/pre-college conservatory). She also founded the Philadelphia chapter of an important organization, Young Audiences, which presents concerts to children. She was active in Philadelphia's Musical Fund Society, a social and philanthropic organization, and was a music advisor to the Philadelphia Chamber Music Society until recently.

== Commissions ==
Phillips commissioned many works for harp, the complete number not yet established. Her most famous commission is the Concerto for Harp by Alberto Ginastera, and other important works include the Concerto for Harp by Nicolai Berezowsky, Concerto by Ernst Krenek, Sea Chanty by Paul White, Eclogue by Alexei Haieff, Concertino by Ernst von Dohnanyi, Auras, a harp concerto by Roberto Caamaño, Suite by Harry Somers, Concertino Antico by Peggy Glanville-Hicks, a concerto by Salvador Bacarisse, a chamber work by Paul Nordoff, Harl McDonald's Suite "From Childhood" for harp and orchestra, and many more. The Sousa Archives and Center for American Music houses the Phillips Music Collection, 1930–1970. It consists of published and unpublished music, much of which was commissioned by Phillips, and many of the pieces bear her hand-written annotations. The collection also includes sound recording of "Sea Chanty" with Phillips on harp.

The 2004 National Conference of the American Harp Society, held at the University of Pennsylvania in Philadelphia, was dedicated in large part to the legacy and memory of Phillips. From her commissioned works, the following were performed: The Concerto by Alberto Ginastera (Yolanda Kondonassis), Eclogue "La Nouvelle Heloise" by Alexei Haieff (Sophie Bruno), Suite "From Childhood" by Harl McDonald (Alice Giles), Concertino Antico by Peggy Glanville-Hicks (Juliana Beckel), Sea Chanty by Paul White (Rong Tan), and Suite for Harp and Chamber Orchestra by Harry Somers (Judy Loman).

Many of the commissions have been published and are easily available. Many are still in manuscript. Isadore Freed dedicated his harp solo Promenade to Phillips, though it is not known to be a commission. Numerous recordings by Phillips with the Philadelphia Orchestra can be found on the Cala, Biddulph and Andante labels. She is featured prominently in The Raven by Arcady Dubensky. She played in the movies The Big Broadcast of 1937, One Hundred Men and a Girl, and the original Fantasia (1940). She also appeared on television with the flutist Samuel Baron. Her harp and music are now in the collection of the University of Illinois at Champaign/Urbana.

== Personal life ==
She was married in 1933 to Sam Rosenbaum, a prominent attorney and board member of the Philadelphia Orchestra, and had a family of two children and two stepchildren. She was survived by her son Hugh Rosenbaum of London, her daughter Joan Solaun of Illinois, two grandchildren (Emma Cristina Solaun, an attorney in Miami, Florida and the daughter of Joan and Mauricio Solaun, and Arwen Cecilia Rosenbaum, the daughter of Hugh and Rowena Rosenbaum), and her stepdaughter Rosamond Bernier.

== Appearances ==
Appearances by EDNA PHILLIPS AS SOLOIST with the PHILADELPHIA ORCHESTRA

1937 3/15 Widor: Chorale et Variations
1937 11/20,21,30 Mozart: Concerto for Flute and Harp, with William Kincaid (flutist)
1941 1/17–5/5, 12/7/42 McDonald: Suite "From Childhood
1944 1/17 Debussy: Danses Sacree et Profane
1944 4/21 White: Sea Chanty
1945 1/26–2/5 Berezowsky: Concerto
1945 4/21, 10/30 White: Sea Chanty
1952 12/12–13 Krenek: Concerto, McDonald: Suite

(from the archives of the Philadelphia Orchestra)
