= Cecil Madigan =

Australian geologist and explorer

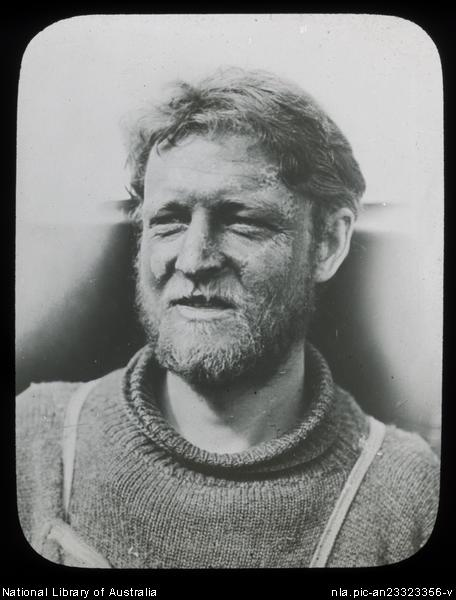
Cecil Madigan's frostbitten face, Adélie Land (Australasian Antarctic Expedition, 1911–1914), by Frank Hurley

Cecil Thomas Madigan (15 October 1889 – 14 January 1947) was an Australian geologist, explorer, academic, aerial surveyor, meteorologist, author, and army officer.

== Early life and education ==
Cecil Thomas Madigan was born in Renmark, South Australia, to contractor and fruitgrower Thomas Madigan and Mary Dixie (née Finey) a teacher. Cecil was the oldest of two sons and two daughters. He was raised by his mother, as his father had died in the Kalgoorlie, Western Australian Goldfields.

He attended Prince Alfred College in Adelaide, and then the University of Adelaide. He graduated with a BSc in mining engineering.

Madigan won a Rhodes Scholarship in 1911 to study geology at Magdalen College, Oxford, but deferred the appointment as he was invited by Sir Douglas Mawson to go as meteorologist on the Australasian Antarctic Expedition.

After doing service in World War I, he returned to Magdalen College, where he earned a B.A. in 1919, M.A. in 1922, and later, D.Sc. in 1933. He won first-class honours in geology and won blues in rowing and boxing.

== Career ==
=== Australasian Antarctic Expedition ===
In December 1911 the party left Hobart on board the SY Aurora. In January 1912 they reached Commonwealth Bay in Adélie Land, Antarctica, where they set up a collection of buildings subsequently known as Mawson's Huts. From there he led several expeditions into uncharted regions of Adélie Land and George V Land. These expeditions gathered vital information about the presence of coal in Antarctica.

=== WWI ===
Madigan later served with the Royal Engineers in France during the First World War. He saw action at the Battle of Loos where he was wounded, and the Battle of the Somme.

=== Geological work in Australia ===
After his return to Australia, Madigan was appointed lecturer in geology at the University of Adelaide in 1922, a post he held until his death, and continued his friendship with Mawson, who had been appointed professor of geology following the retirement of Walter Howchin in 1920. Mawson and Madigan, along with their students at the university, made important additions to geology, in particular understanding the Cambrian. During the 1920s, Madigan undertook extensive study and mapping of the Cambrian on the Fleurieu Peninsula, and determined that this section of the coastline was overturned. Reg Sprigg later gave Madigan particular credit for his early work on the Cambrian.

Throughout the 1930s, Madigan participated in numerous aerial surveys of the "trackless areas" of Central Australia, during which time he named the Simpson Desert after Alfred Allen Simpson, president of the South Australian branch of the Royal Geographical Society of Australasia.

In 1937 he confirmed that the Boxhole crater is a meteoric impact crater. In 1939 he led the first major expedition across the Simpson Desert. Although he was not the first to cross the desert, he has become known as the last of the "classic" explorers of central Australia.

=== Army instructor ===
After the beginning of World War II, 1940 Madigan was asked to set up the School of Military Field Engineering at Liverpool, New South Wales, where he was promoted to lieutenant-colonel.

In 1943 he returned to the University of Adelaide.

== Recognition and honours ==
In 1914 Madigan was awarded the King's Polar Medal.

He was president of the Royal Society of South Australia in 1936.

In 1945, he was awarded the Verco Medal.

== Death and legacy ==
Madigan died of coronary vascular disease in Adelaide, on 14 January 1947.

He founded the Tate Society for students of the natural sciences at the University of Adelaide.

== Family ==
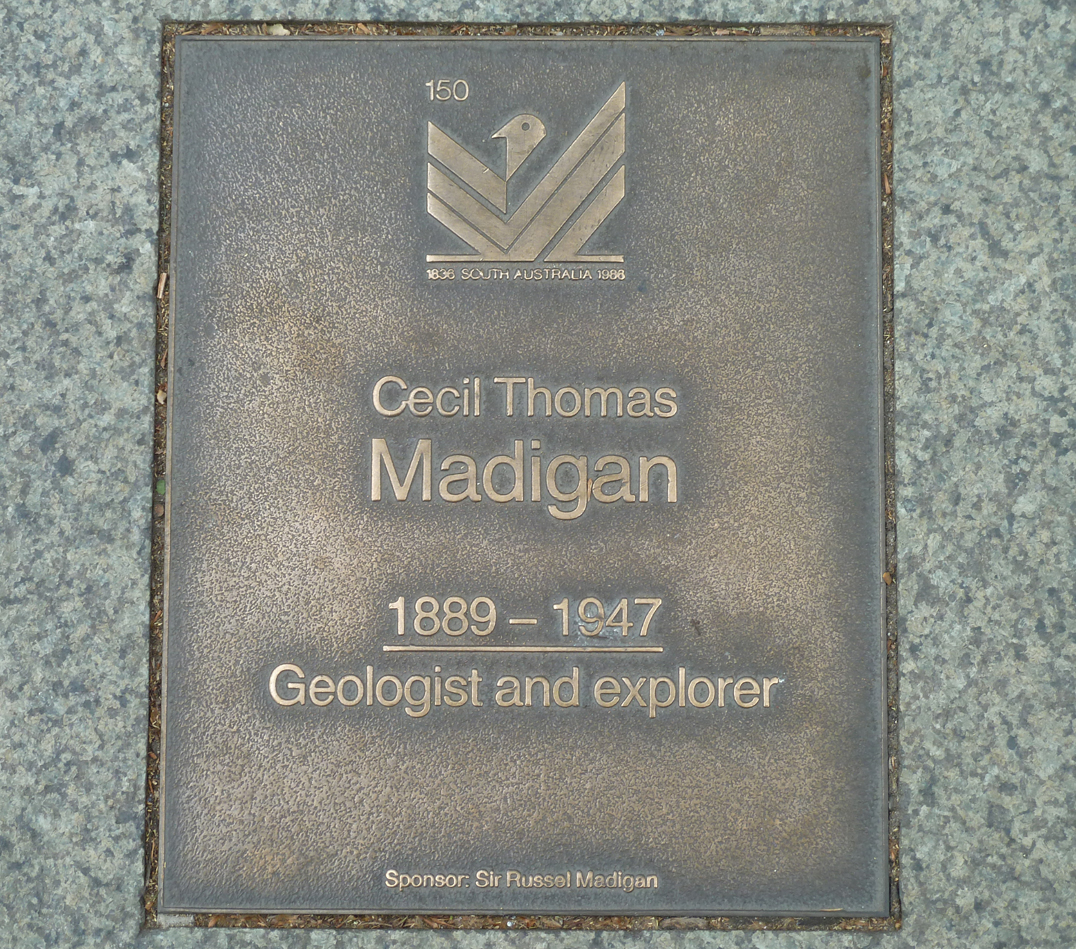
Memorial plaque to Cecil Madigan on North Terrace, Adelaide

He married Wynnis Knight Wollaston, a native of Adelaide, Australia, whilst he was in London in 1915. The daughter of Cecil Madigan is renowned Australian sculptor Rosemary Madigan, and her daughter is leading harpist Alice Giles.

His family had associations with William Benjamin Chaffey.

== See also ==
- Centre points of Australia
- Boxhole crater
- Huckitta (meteorite)

== Publications ==
- 1944 - Central Australia. Oxford University Press: Melbourne.
- 1946 - Crossing the Dead Heart. Georgian House: Melbourne. ISBN 1-876622-16-4
- 2012 - Madigan's Account: The Mawson Expedition : the Antarctic Diaries of C.T. Madigan, 1911-1914 Wellington Bridge Press. ISBN 9781921767098
