= International Harp Archives =

Coordinates: 40.249°N 111.649°W

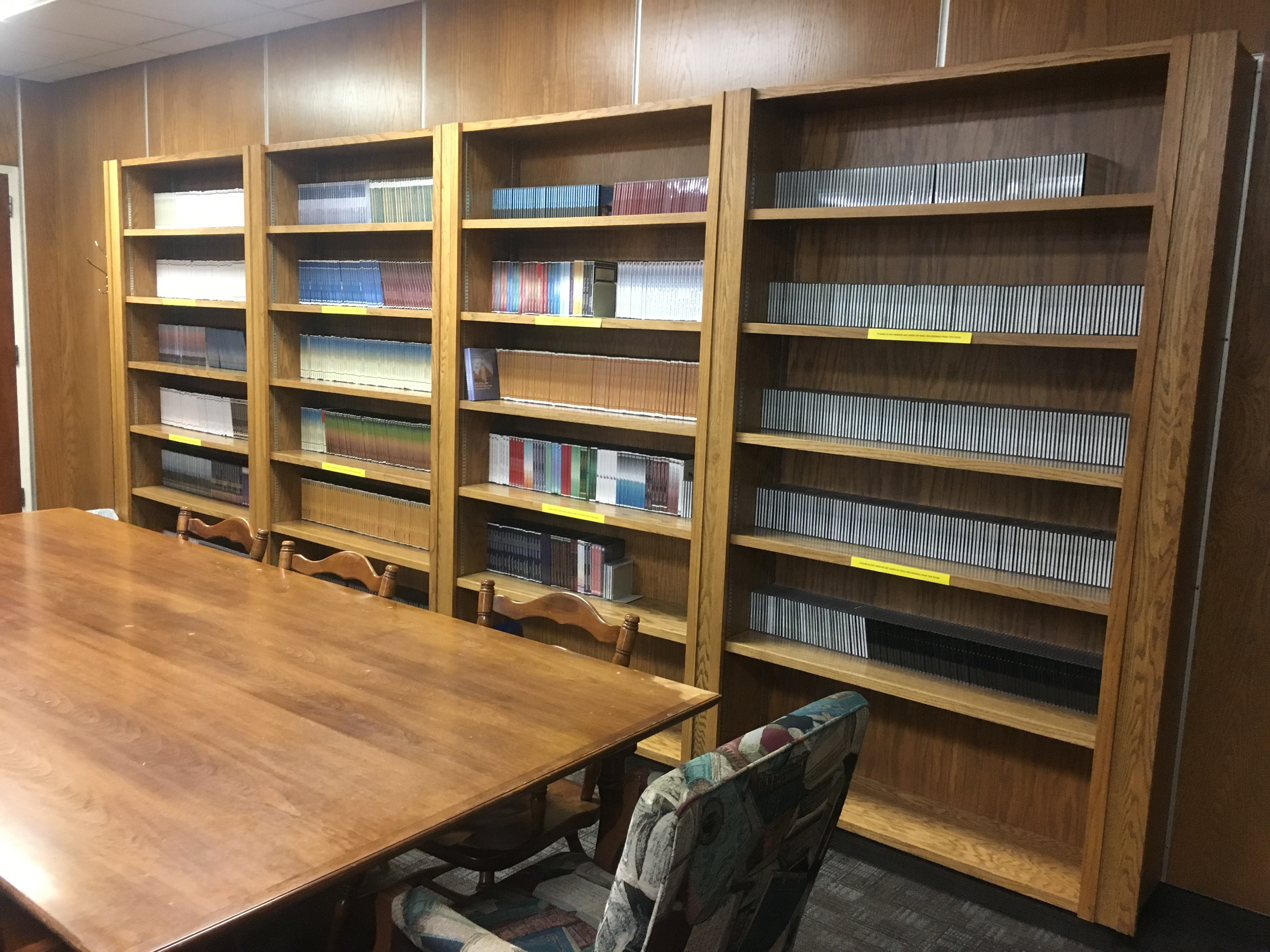
Shelves with audio and visual recordings that can be used in the archive room.

The International Harp Archives (IHA) is a collection of archives from the World Harp Congress, American Harp Society, and individual harpists. It is located at the Harold B. Lee Library in Brigham Young University (BYU). The archives began as a collection established by Samuel and Rosalie Pratt, and it may be the largest collection of harp materials in the world.

== History ==
Harpists Samuel and Rosalie Pratt had their own personal collection of harp-related materials. Samuel designed the original Troubadour harp and owned a harp repair business. His wife Rosalie was a professor of music at BYU. They donated their collection of harp-related materials to BYU in 1985. After the Pratt's initial donation, additional major donations arrived at the university, including one from the Victor Salvi Foundation. The International Harp Archives was formally established in 1994 due to the collection's growth.

== Holdings ==
The archives consist of over 11,000 scores and recordings that use the harp. Items such as "manuscripts and recordings, photographs, correspondence, programs and other documents" are included in the collection. Additionally, the IHA serves as a central hub for any information regarding the harp, its music, and harpists. Nearly 60 major contributors donated materials to the collection. All archived items are housed in the Harold B. Lee Library on BYU's campus. The archives and its materials are organized by the general collection and the non-circulating special collections.

The IHA partners with the Archives of the American Harp Society to offer a lending library through BYU's library. Only American Harp Society members are permitted to request archived materials offsite. Other library patrons can view materials in person. In 1987, the American Harp Society began an interview series with notable harpists, including Lucile Lawrence and Alice Chalifoux. These interviews can be accessed via the AHS lending library.

The IHA aims to preserve the harp's history and make the collected materials available to through their Internet Archive. A project to scan and make all pre-1923 published scores available online is ongoing. Over 2,400 public domain records have been scanned for public access through the online archive.

== Gallery ==
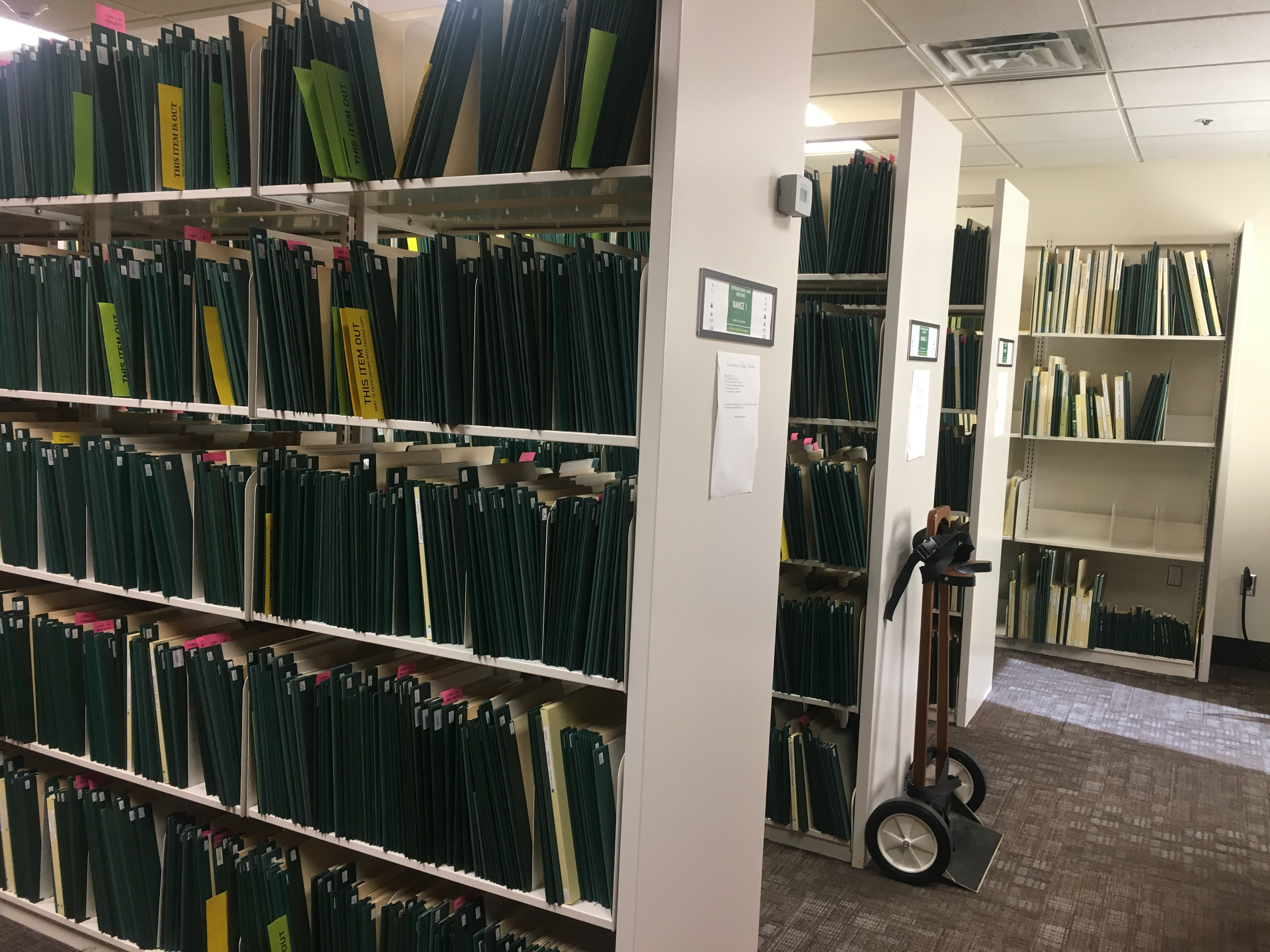
Sheet music and other harp-related documents

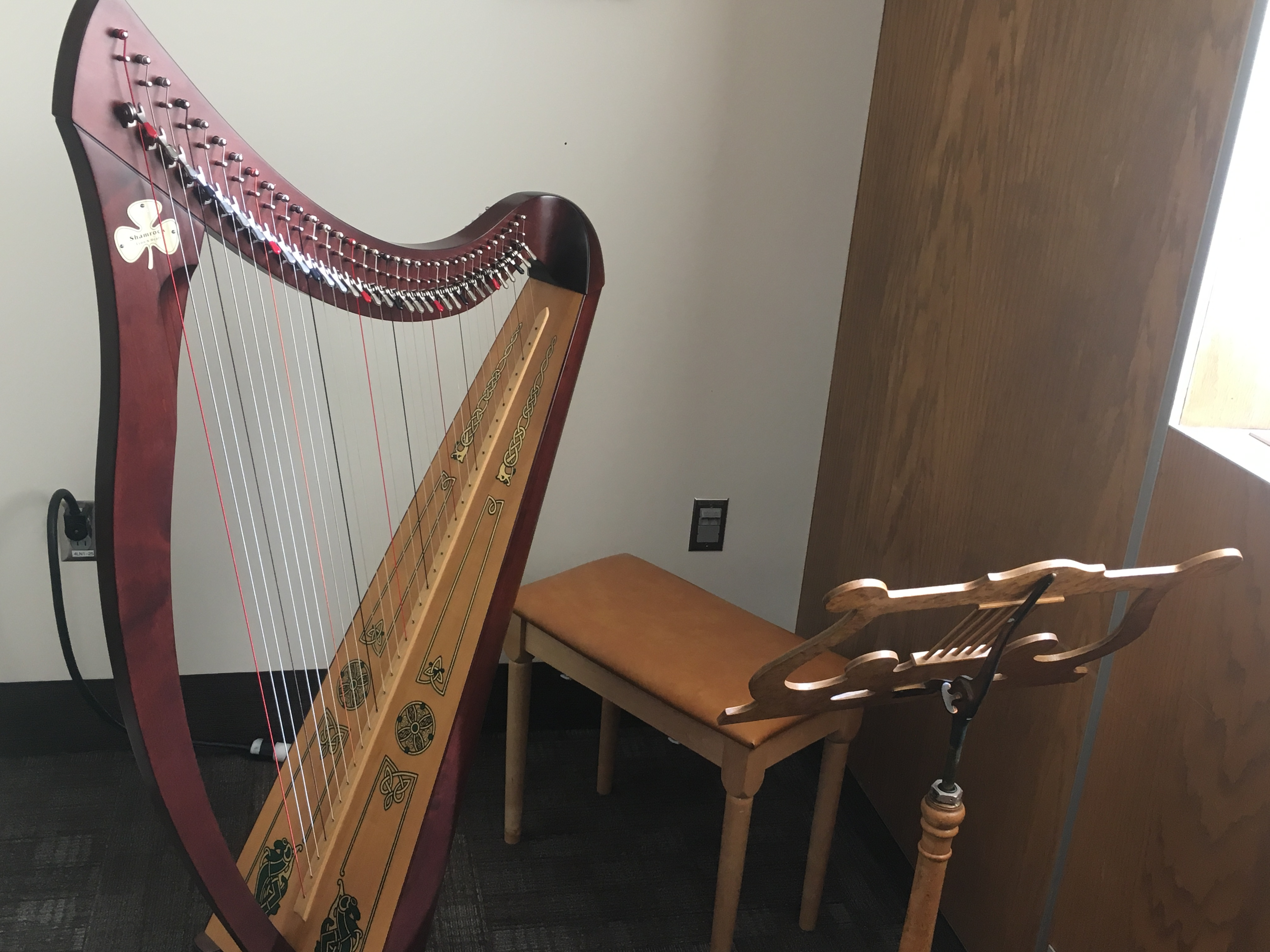
Harp 1

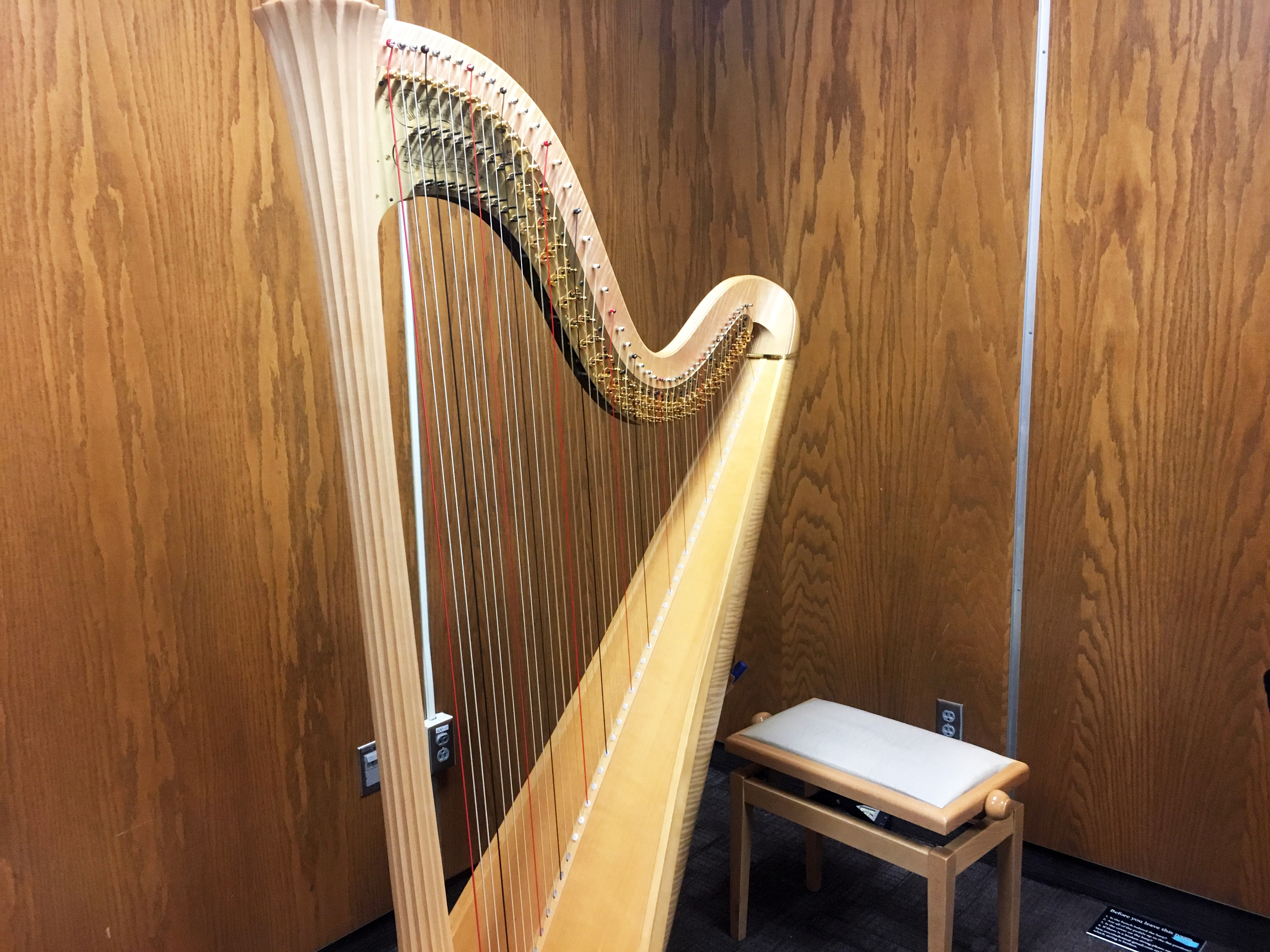
Harp 2
