= Beatrice Schroeder Rose =

Beatrice Schroeder Rose (15 November 1922 – 12 October 2014) was an author, composer, harpist and teacher who was best known for her classic reference work, The Harp in the Orchestra: A Reference Book for Harpists, Teachers, Composers and Conductors. She was the principal harpist of Houston Symphony for 31 years.

== Life ==
Rose was born in Ridgewood, New Jersey, to Ida LeHovey and Henry William Schroeder. She performed on the harp as a student at Ridgewood High School. She studied harp at Blue Ridge College in New Windsor, Maryland, and at Mannes School of Music. Her teachers included Lucile Lawrence and Carlos Salzedo.

In 1936, Rose received First Prize in the Federated Music Clubs contest. Rose debuted as a harpist at the 1939 New York World's Fair. In 1940, she performed on the Damrosch Music Appreciation Hour and in 1945, she won the New York Hour of Music award. She was an associate harpist in the Radio City Music Hall Orchestra from 1944 to 1950.

In 1952, then a resident of Bergenfield, New Jersey, she travelled to Europe for a tour of France, Italy and Switzerland that included a performance in Genoa that was attended by the United States ambassador to Italy.

She joined the Houston Symphony as principal harpist in 1953, where she remained until 1984. In 1954 she married Houston Symphony tubist William Harrison Rose.

Rose also taught harp privately and at Rice University, Sam Houston State Teachers College, St. Agnes Academy, and the University of Houston. Her students included Betsy Brownlee, Barbara Goodrich, Leah Jorgensen, Sorana Scarlat, and Amy Waltz.

In 1968, Rose founded the Houston Harp Ensemble, which appeared on PBS television.

Rose belonged to the American Harp Society and the National Federation of Music Clubs. She was a member of and an adjudicator for the Texas Music Educators Association.

== Book ==
- The Harp in the Orchestra: A Reference Book for Harpists, Teachers, Composers and Conductors

== Music ==
- Enchanted Harp
- Jack and the Giant
- Hear Jack and the Giant by Beatrice Schroeder Rose
