= June Loney =

Australian harpist

June Ellen Loney MBE (1930 – 5 June 2016) was an Australian harpist.

== Biography ==
Loney was born in 1930 in Hurstville, Sydney, the youngest of six children of Irish migrant parents. As a child, she had piano lessons with local convent nuns. Later she studied at the Sydney Conservatorium of Music, achieving a Licentiate in Music (LMusA).

After graduating, Loney performed and accompanied other musicians in Australian Broadcasting Corporation studios. However, she wanted to perform in an orchestra and decided to learn the harp. She started lessons with concert harpist Evan Davies, followed by Elizabeth Vidler, principal harp with the Sydney Symphony Orchestra (SSO). Loney was given the position of second harp for the SSO and in 1963, when Vidler retired, she was appointed principal harpist. Loney held this position until 1984.

In 1965, Loney spent some time in the US studying with Alice Chalifoux, principal harp with the Cleveland Orchestra, and attending the Salzedo Summer School.

After she returned to Australia, Loney formed the Harp Association of Sydney, began to teach at the Conservatorium, broadcast on radio, gave talks, and put on chamber music concerts with SSO colleagues, some with young students playing small pieces.

In the early 1980s, she recorded Ravel and Debussy with the SSO under Willem van Otterloo for the Chandos label, and Bird Song for the ABC.

In 1984, Loney retired from SSO. She remained active in music, by forming the Harp Society of New South Wales and becoming its musical director. She also continued to teach part-time at the Conservatorium until 1997, when she moved to Queensland. In 1993 she completed a PhD Honours in Social Work at University of New South Wales; her subject was Agoraphobia in Women: Its Social Origins.

=== Recognition ===
In 1977, Loney was appointed a Member of the Order of the British Empire (MBE).
