= Boxhole crater =

Impact crater in Northern Territory of Australia

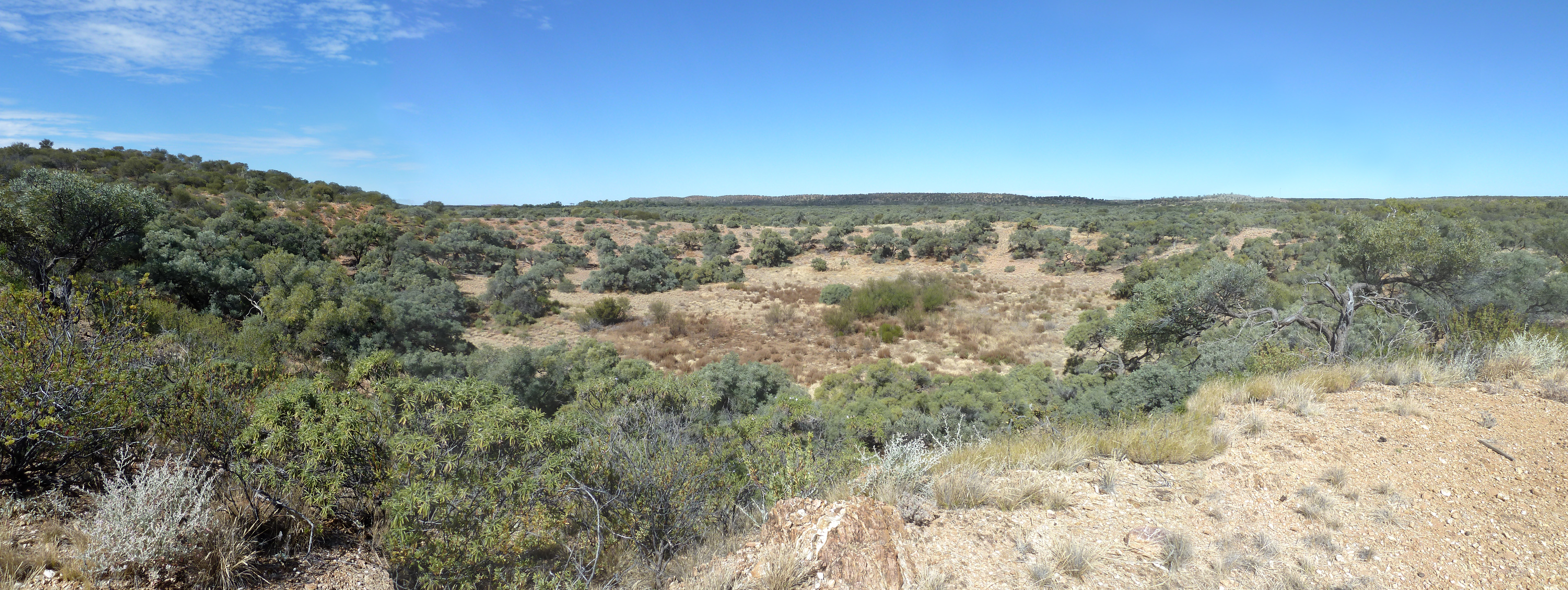
- Boxhole meteorite crater, July 2011

- Location within Northern Territory
- Location: Northern Territory, Australia; 22°36′45″S 135°11′43″E

Impact crater structure
- Confidence: Confirmed
- Diameter: 170 m (560 ft)
- Age: 5.4 ± 1.5 ka Holocene
- Exposed: Yes
- Drilled: No

Boxhole is a young impact crater located approximately 180 km (265 km by road) north-east of Alice Springs in the Northern Territory, Australia. It is 170 metres in diameter and its age is estimated to be 5,400 ± 1,500 years based on the cosmogenic ^{14}C terrestrial age of the meteorite, placing it in the Holocene. The crater is exposed to the surface.

== Description ==
In 1937 Joe Webb, a shearer at Boxhole sheep station, took geologist Cecil Madigan to examine the crater. Madigan discovered nickel-bearing metallic fragments and iron shale-balls similar to those found at Henbury to the south of Alice Springs. It was the second impact crater to be described in Australia, after Henbury. A later search found additional meteoritic metal including an iron mass of 181 pounds (82 kg) , now in the Natural History Museum, London.

== See also ==
- List of impact craters in Australia
