= Heidi Lehwalder =

- Born: Seattle, Washington; United States
- Genre: Classical
- Instrument: Harp
- Years active: 1958-present
- Website: www.heidi-lehwalder.com

Heidi Lehwalder (born 1949) is an American classical harpist. She is internationally renowned as one of the world's greatest harp prodigies, and as the final student of master Carlos Salzedo. Leonard Bernstein said of her, "...The main thing to tell you about Heidi is that she is simply a genius," in his notes for the Young People's Concerts. She was the first recipient of the prestigious Avery Fisher Prize, later to be renamed the Avery Fisher Career Grant. Heidi was given a harp at the age of seven by her mother, who was a cellist with the Seattle Symphony, and Heidi made her debut performing with the Seattle Symphony at nine. She studied with Carlos Salzedo at his music colony in Camden, Maine for two summers beginning in 1960, and it was Salzedo who prepared her to play in The International Harp Contest in Israel in 1962. The Philharmonic Hall commentary on the contest said that "Heidi was the one and only sensation of the entire affair."

In 1962, she appeared on The Firestone Hour with Dick Clark. On December 23, 1963, Lehwalder appeared on Leonard Bernstein’s Young People's Concerts on CBS at the age of 14. In 1964, she won the Young Musicians Competition in Los Angeles. In 1969, Lehwalder was a recipient of a Rockefeller Grant as well as a Ford Foundation Grant which enabled her to commission Pulitzer Prize winner Michael Colgrass to write Auras, a Concerto for Harp and Orchestra. Lehwalder premiered Coloros Magicos by José Serebrier and Roberto Caamano's Concerto for Harp and Orchestra with the National Symphony Orchestra at the Pan American Festival in Washington, DC in 1970 and 1973 respectively.

Lehwalder has performed as a soloist with more than sixty-five orchestras throughout the United States, including The New York Philharmonic, The Cleveland Orchestra, The National Symphony Orchestra, The Atlanta Symphony, The Nashville Symphony, The Buffalo Philharmonic, The Los Angeles Chamber Orchestra, The Oregon Symphony, The Boston Civic Orchestra and has had numerous solo appearances with the Seattle Symphony Orchestra. She has been a frequent guest with the Chamber Music Society of Lincoln Center as well as numerous music festivals.

She teaches masterclasses internationally, including at the Juilliard School, the Manhattan School of Music, and the 12th World Harp Congress in Sydney, Australia. She is the founder and was the director of the Fredericksburg Festival of the Arts in Fredericksburg, Virginia as well as the Chamber on the Mountain Series in Ojai, California.

As a recording artist Lehwalder has recorded for Nonesuch, CRI, RCA, Vanguard and RCA Red Seal.

== Select Discography ==
- 2014 - Forever is Composed of Nows (Crystal Records)
- 2006 - Orpheus Trio plays Debussy, Ravel, Faure, Devienne (Vanguard Classics)
- 1995 - Impressions (RCA Victor Red Seal)
- 1989 - Ceremonies of Carols: Works by Britten, Poulenc, and Respighi (RCA Legacy)
- 1983 - Scintillation – Music for the Harp (Nonesuch)
- 1980 - Debussy Sonata for Flute, Viola and Harp; Syrinx for Solo Flute; Ravel Sonatine en Trio; Faure Impromptu for Harp Op. 86; Devienne Duo III for Flute and Viola (Vanguard Audiophile Recording)
