= Fernando de la Mora (tenor) =

Mexican opera singer

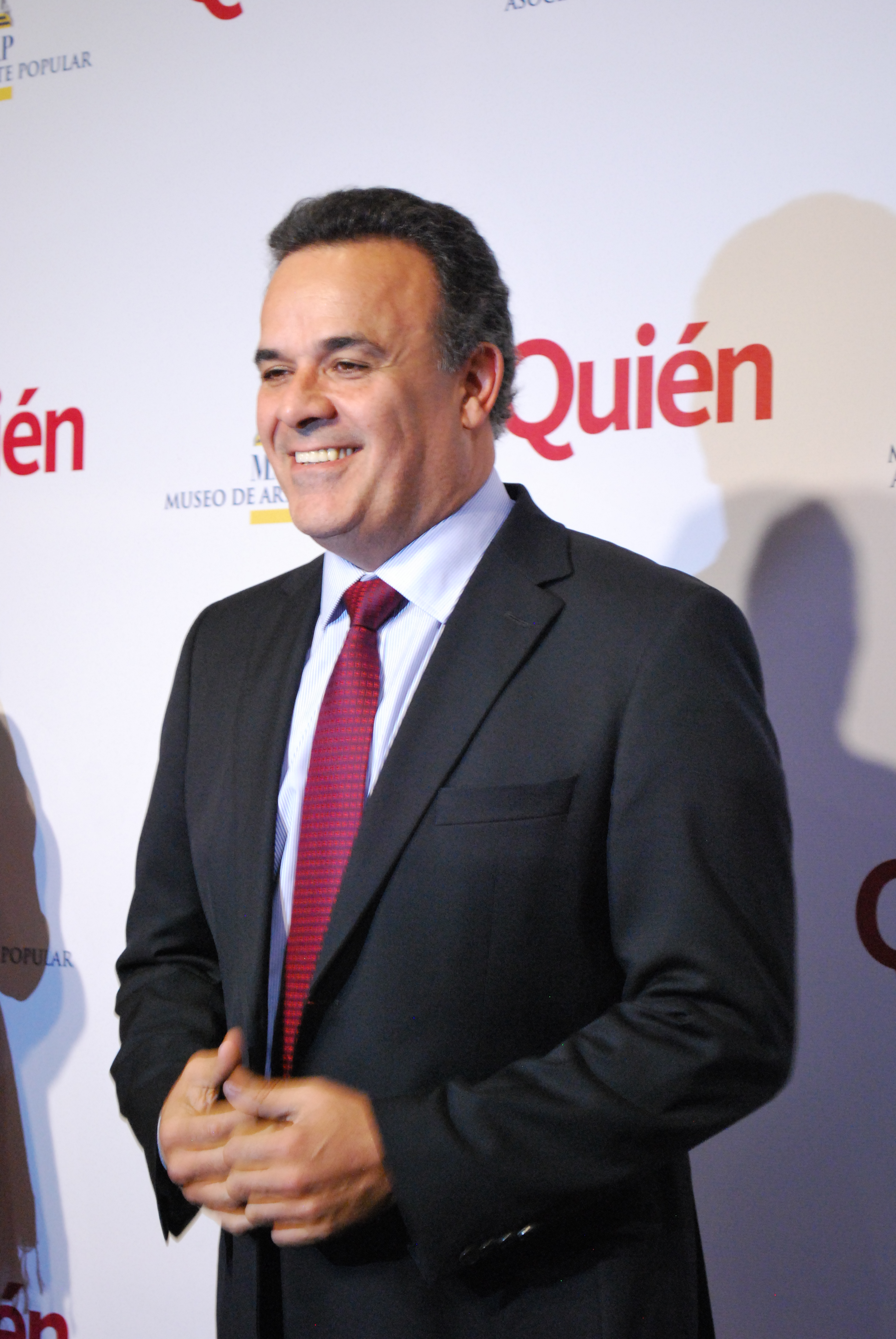

Background information
- Born: June 7, 1958 (age 66); Mexico City
- Origin: Mexican
- Genres: Opera
- Instrument: Voice (tenor)
- Years active: 1986–present)

Fernando de la Mora (born 1958) is a Mexican operatic tenor. He began his music education in the National Conservatory of Mexico and studied with Leticia Velázquez and Rosa Rimoch.

He made his debut in Jalapa with Madama Butterfly in 1986, later in the Metropolitan Opera House in New York, San Francisco, Los Angeles, Houston, Miami, San Diego, La Scala in Milan, Vienna State Opera, Opéra Bastille of Paris, Covent Garden of London and many others.

He has worked with conductors like Zubin Mehta, Riccardo Muti, Lorin Maazel, Charles Mackerras, Eduardo Mata, and Richard Bonynge.

He mainly sings Italian and French opera. He has more than 20 recordings, most of them on Telarc.

== Repertoire ==
- Lord Percy - Anna Bolena
- Don José - Carmen
- Faust - Faust
- Rodolfo - La Bohème
- Alfredo - La Traviata
- Gerald - Lakmé
- Hoffman - Les contes d'Hoffman
- Edgardo - Lucia di Lammermoor
- Macduff - Macbeth
- Pinkerton - Madama Butterfly
- Chevalier des Grieux - "Manon"
- the Duke of Mantua - Rigoletto
- Roberto Devereux - Roberto Devereux
- Roméo - Roméo et Juliette
- Mario Cavaradossi - Tosca
- Werther - Werther

== Sources ==
- Cummings, D. (ed,), "de la Mora, Fernando", International Who's Who in Classical Music, Routledge, 2003, pp. 180–181. ISBN 1-85743-174-X
