= Lucile Lawrence =

American harpist (1907–2004)

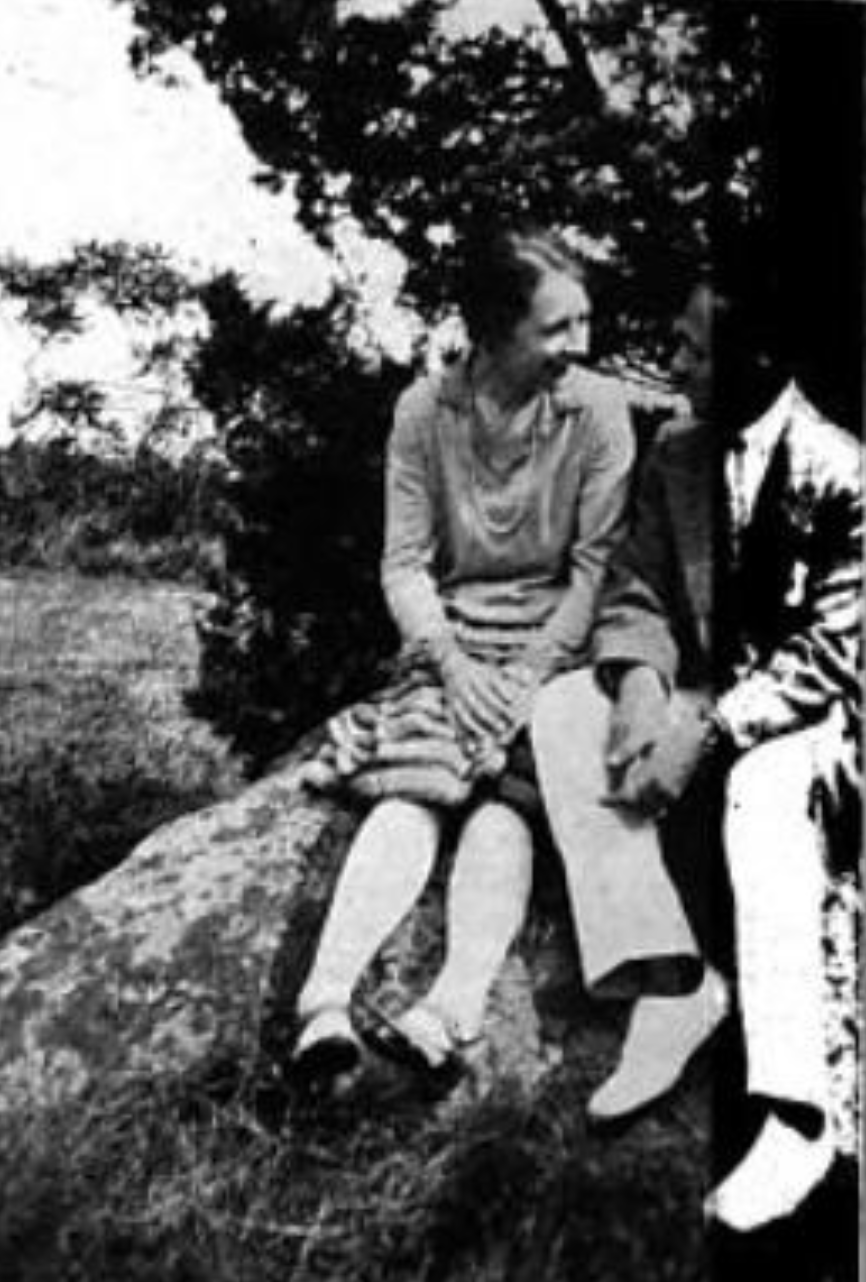
Lucile Lawrence with Carlos Salzedo in 1928.

Lucile Lawrence (February 7, 1907 in New Orleans – July 8, 2004 in Englewood, New Jersey) was an American harpist. At the end of her life, she was a faculty member of Boston University and the Manhattan School of Music, as well as teaching privately.

== Career ==
Lucile Lawrence was born into a family with historic roots in New England (Lawrence, Massachusetts). Her father was a businessman in New Orleans, at one time owner of the first cold-storage warehouse in the city.

She was a fourth-generation harpist, and began studying the harp at age six. At the age of only eight years old, she appeared as soloist with the New Orleans Junior Philharmonic. A child prodigy, she was later introduced to the French-American harpist Carlos Salzedo while he was performing in New Orleans while on tour in the renowned group Trio de Lutece (with Georges Barrere and Paul Kefer). She began private study with him in New York Citym and in Seal Harbor, Maine, at the age of 14. She completed her studies and graduated from high school at the age of 15, upon which she moved with her mother to New York in order to study full-time with Salzedo. She studied harp intensively with Salzedo, while her general studies of music history and theory were conducted in small classes of Salzedo's pupils, taught by the eminent composer Edgard Varèse.

She made her professional debut age 18 with an eight-month concert tour of Australia and New Zealand, a lengthy 123-concert tour of joint recitals with the soprano Edna Thomas and her accompanist.

Upon returning to the U.S., she continued her private study with Salzedo, toured as first harpist in the Salzedo Harp Ensemble throughout the U.S., and with her own Lawrence Harp Quintette on smaller engagements. She then married Salzedo, an event reported in the Minneapolis Tribune and other newspapers. Together, they built his summer harp colony in Camden, Maine, Lawrence funding the purchase with her own funds, and by working hard as the harpist in the orchestra of Radio City Music Hall, led by Erno Rapee, all through the 1930s. For personal reasons, they divorced in 1936. She subsequently married Paul Dahlstrom, a sound-engineer colleague from Radio City Music Hall, and had a son, Lawrence.

In her career, she appeared as harp soloist with the Cleveland Orchestra, the Chicago Symphony, the Chamber Orchestra of Boston, the Conductorless Orchestra, the George Barrere Ensemble, the Coolidge Festival of Chamber Music, as well as in duo-recital with Salzedo, and in the New York Trio with Frances Blaisdell and Seymour Barab. She premiered and recorded Salzedo's Concerto for Harp and Seven Winds. She performed in the symphony orchestra of Radio City Music Hall, and in the 1950s on television in the Firestone Orchestra on the Voice of Firestone television broadcasts, where she appeared as soloist, and could be seen in many episodes, accompanying famous singers. A favorite harpist of Leopold Stokowski, whom she knew for many years through Salzedo, she made many recordings under his baton. She also performed in the well-known Victory at Sea recording of music by Richard Rodgers. Other recordings include The Flowering Peach by Alan Hovhaness, and a Mercury LP with Carlos Salzedo.

While married to Salzedo, they made a summer trip to Europe to fulfill concert engagements and met with composer Maurice Ravel. She performed his Introduction et Allegro and received his instructions on how to perform it. It was agreed that on their return the next summer, Ravel would compose a harp concerto. However, instead the next year, they purchased a house in Camden, Maine, and launched the Salzedo Summer Harp Colony, which continued into the late 1990s.

She continued to work as an in-demand freelance musician in New York City for many years, filling in when needed at the Metropolitan Opera for one, and she turned down full-time positions with the Philadelphia Orchestra, New York Philharmonic, and the Metropolitan Opera because she had so much studio work, recording and in television, which was the highest-paid work. Instead, she might send her students to take such positions.

Lawrence was a dedicated teacher for most of her life. Lawrence and Salzedo together developed the Method for the Harp, to assist with teaching. She wrote the text and the foundational exercises according to his instruction of the harp, and he composed the Preludes for Beginners that complete it, including one of his most-famous compositions, Chanson dans la nuit. They also collaborated on The Art of Modulating, and the ABC of Harp Playing, and finally the Pathfinder Studies, most of which were published by G. Schirmer. The Method for the Harp is one of the most widely used harp method books of the 20th Century. The Art of Modulating, which included instruction in how to play for radio broadcasts and in popular music orchestras, with guidance on how to play "segues" became popular with jazz musicians.

Lawrence was a faculty member of the Curtis Institute of Music, the Philadelphia Musical Academy, Mannes College of Music, Manhattan School of Music, Boston University and Boston University Tanglewood Institute, and taught students at Yale University and Harvard University. She was hired by Peter Mennin to succeed Marcel Grandjany at the Juilliard School, but the appointment was undone under pressure from some of Grandjany's students. She always taught privately, even piano lessons, and conducted master classes. She taught several master classes in Denver, where she had great influence. She performed a famous recital to open the American Harp Society National Conference in San Diego, in which she performed nearly all the major solo works for harp by Carlos Salzedo, which she then released on a privately issued two-LP albumm which also contained her edition of the Sonata for Harp by CPE Bach, and Intrada by Josef Tal. It is often aired on Wisconsin Public Radio among other stations.

She served as the first president of the American Harp Society, and as a judge for the International Harp Contest in Israel. Over the years, she taught such harpists as Cynthia Otis (formerly New York City Ballet Orchestra, Little Orchestra Society, Joffrey Ballet Orchestra), Velma Froude (Cass Tech faculty), Beatrice Schroeder Rose (Houston Symphony, faculties of Rice University, U. of Houston), Maria Pinckney (St. Louis Symphony), Patricia Terry-Ross (Detroit/Motown harpist), Grace Wong (Israel Harp Contest top prize-winner, Rochester Symphony) Elizabeth Morse Feldman (Boston Symphony Orchestra), and Sara Cutler (soloist, NYC Ballet). Other prominent students include Susan Robinson, Claudia Valsi, Saul Davis Zlatkovski, Jennifer Hoult, Elizabeth Panzer, Ray Pool, Beth Schwartz Robinson, Henry Whitmire, and many more. Each summer, for many years, she taught the Harp Seminar of the Boston University Tanglewood Institute, where as many as ten students from age 16 and up, including professional performers, would spend eight weeks in intensive study of harp repertoire and technique.

She published with G. Schirmer the seminal texts Method for the Harp, ABC of Harp Playing and Art of Modulating, with musical contributions by Carlos Salzedo, and with Peer-Southern, Pathfinder to the Harp, for which Salzedo contributed one study. She published several editions of solos for teaching, and the seminal Solos for the Harp Player, which included several transcriptions by Salzedo, and music ranging from the Renaissance to Slovenian composer Alojz Srebotnjak. She worked with many composers, including John Lessard, Rudolf Forst, Quinto Maganini, Charles Fox, George Perle, and Ami Maayani, editing their music and helping them write more effectively for the harp.

At the age of 93, she was still traveling weekly to Boston University from her home in River Edge, New Jersey to teach her students. She gave her last master class in Philadelphia in 2003, aged 96, for the American Harp Society Philadelphia Chapter. She long suffered from attacks of pneumonia in the winters, and she later died of complications from pneumonia in 2004. She was survived by her son, Lawrence Dahlstrom and his family, and her hundreds of pupils.

== Discography ==
- Transcriptions and Original Compositions for 2 Harps, Mercury MG 1044
  - La Joyeuse — Rameau – Salzedo
  - Gavotte — Martini – Salzedo
  - Play of the Winds — Dandrieu – Salzedo
  - Spinning Wheel — Mendelssohn – Salzedo
  - On Wings of Song — Mendelssohn – Salzedo
  - Spanish Dance No. 5 — Granados – Salzedo
  - Clair de Lune — Debussy – Salzedo
  - Steel — Salzedo, from the suite Pentacle
- Ten Songs from the Hebrew by Stefan Wolpe, Columbia Masterworks OCLC 57040691; Leon Lishner with David Tudor, Samuel Baron, Lucile Lawrence, Claus Adam, Elden Bailey, Anahid Ajemian, Maro Ajemian, Alan Hovhaness
- King David by Artur Honegger and works by Debussy, Vogt Quality Recordings OCLC 27038918; René Morax, Blanche Honegger Moyse, Louis Moyse, Lucile Lawrence, Brattleboro Music Center Festival Orchestra (probably a recording of the Sonate for flute, harp and viola by Debussy)
- Benjamin Britten: Ceremony of Carols; unknown choir with Lucile Lawrence, solo harpist, under Franz Allers
- Soloist in the following RCA recordings (many re-released on the CALA label and others): Leopold Stokowski conducting
  - Aurora's Wedding LM 1774
  - Tristan und Isolde LM 1174
  - Debussy: Nocturnes, Prelude de l'Apres-midi d'un Faune, Clair de Lune LM 1154
  - Sibelius: Symphony no. 1 LM 1125
  - Heart of the Ballet: LM 1083
  - Stravinsky/Ibert: Firebird, Escales LM 9020

(this is a partial listing)

- Soloist in the Concerto for Harp and Seven Winds by Carlos Salzedo (Columbia)
- Soundtrack of two films:
  - Opus 20 Modern Masterworks: Edgard Varese (1992) interview directed by Helmut Rost
  - Around and About Joan Miró (1955) directed by Thomas Bouchard (she performs a work by Cabezon)

== Video ==
Solo harpist in the Voice of Firestone Orchestra, television program, conducted by Howard Barlow, with an appearance as soloist now viewable on YouTube, and as orchestra member for several seasons.
Interviewed in a BBC documentary on Edgard Varese (ca. 1990s)
The Method for the Harp, an interview and demonstration, with Dewey Owens and Elizabeth Morse Feldman, illustrating the Preludes for Beginners by Carlos Salzedo, and the tone colors devised by Salzedo, also in the Modern Study of the Harp.

== Publications ==
- Method for the Harp (with Salzedo), G. Schirmer, pub.
- The Art of Modulating (with Salzedo), G. Schirmer
- The ABC of Harp Playing (with Salzedo), G. Schirmer
- Pathfinder Studies for the Harp, Southern (includes original music studies, with the exception of Conflict, which is by Carlos Salzedo)
- Solos for the Harp Player, G. Schirmer
- Four Vignettes by Bernard Wagenaar
- Concerto for Harp by G. F. Handel, Lyra
- Sonata for Harp by C. P. E. Bach, Colin
- Variations on a Swiss Air by Beethoven, Lyra
- Variations by L. Spohr, Lyra
- Six Sonatinas by J. L. Dussek, Lyra
- Three-volume collection of music for beginners by French, German, English composers, Lyra
- Maqamat by Ami Maayani, Lyra
- Passacaglia dans le Style Oriental by Ami Maayani, Lyra
- Toccata by Ami Maayani, Israel Music Publishers
- Ancient Dance by Charles Fox, Peer
- Four French Ritournelles by Marcel Etchecopar, M. Baron

== Music dedicated to Lucile Lawrence ==
- Suite of Eight Dances by Carlos Salzedo, published by G. Schirmer
- Passacaglia dans le style Oriental by Ami Maayani, published by Lyra
- Concerto for Harp and Seven Winds by Carlos Salzedo, published by Lyra
- Suite for Cello and Harp by Lou Harrison, published by Peer International Corporation
