= Judy Loman =

American-Canadian harpist

- Born: 3 November 1936 (age 89); Goshen, Indiana
- Occupations: Classical harpist, teacher
- Years active: 1959–1991

Judy Loman CM (born 3 November 1936) is a harpist and harp teacher, born and educated in the United States and active in Canada. She was the principal harp of the Toronto Symphony Orchestra from 1959 until her retirement in 1991, and won a Juno award for Best Classical Album in 1980. She taught at the University of Toronto and established a summer school for harpists. Loman was appointed a member of the Order of Canada in 2015.

== Early life ==
Judy Loman was born Judith Ann Leatherman in Goshen, Indiana. She studied the harp with Carlos Salzedo from 1947 to 1956, first at his summer harp colony in Camden, Maine, and later at the Curtis Institute of Music. At Curtis, she met the man who became her husband, trumpeter Joseph Umbrico. They remained married until his death in 2007. Together, the couple raised three daughters and a son.

== Career ==
Loman moved to Toronto in 1957 when her husband was hired as principal trumpet of the Toronto Symphony Orchestra. Loman joined the orchestra as principal harp in 1959, a position she retained until her retirement in 1991. She appeared as soloist with the orchestra many times, including the premiers of concertos by John Weinzweig, Harry Somers, and R. Murray Schafer. She has also appeared as soloist with the Calgary Philharmonic Orchestra, Edmonton Symphony Orchestra, and the CBC Vancouver Orchestra.

Loman taught at the University of Toronto Faculty of Music from 1966 to 1991. In 1977, she established a summer school for harpists near Fenelon Falls, Ontario. Her pupils have included Mariko Anraku, Gianetta Baril, Nora Bumanis, Lori Gemmell, Erica Goodman, Sharlene Wallace and Angelica Hairston.

Loman's recording of The Crown of Ariadne by R. Murray Schafer won a Juno award for Best Classical Album of the Year in 1980. She received another nomination in 2000 for recording Ae Fond Kiss with soprano Edith Wiens and pianist Rudolph Jansen. In 1995, another Juno award went to harpist Erica Goodman, who studied with Loman.

In 2015, Judy Loman was appointed a member of the Order of Canada, "For her service to the arts community as one of Canada's renowned harpists."

In addition to teaching masterclasses around the world, Loman is a visiting artist at the Curtis Institute of Music, adjunct professor of harp at the University of Toronto, and an instructor at the Glenn Gould School, Royal Conservatory of Music in Toronto.
