= Alice Giles =

Australian harpist

- Born: 1961 (age 64–65); Adelaide
- Occupation: Harpist

Alice Rosemary Giles AM (born c. 1961) is an Australian classical harpist.

== Early life and education ==
She was born in Adelaide, and trained with June Loney at the Sydney Conservatorium of Music. In 1982, aged 21, she won the 8th International Harp Contest in Israel. She was awarded a Churchill Fellowship and an Australia Council grant to study overseas. There she studied with Alice Chalifoux of the Cleveland Orchestra, and also with Lydia Shaxson and Judith Liber.

== Career ==
She has performed in many countries throughout Europe, the Americas, Israel and her home country. Her New York debut was at the Merkin Hall in 1983, and she has also performed at the Wigmore Hall in London.

Luciano Berio described her as "the most intelligent, sensitive and technically accomplished harpist" he had ever met. Berio considered her the foremost interpreter of his Sequenza II.

After touring and living overseas (mainly in Germany) for some years, Giles and her husband, the Israeli pianist Arnan Wiesel, returned to Australia permanently in 1998. Giles and Wiesel both taught at the ANU School of Music in Canberra, Giles from 1998 and Wiesel from 2000 as Head of the Keyboard Department. In 2012 they were both made redundant as part of funding cuts. They were advised they did not have the requisite set of skills. She now teaches at the Sydney Conservatorium and the Australian National Academy of Music in Melbourne.

Since 2026 She is the Chair of the World Harp Congress.

She is the Artistic Director of the Seven Harp Ensemble. She is founder and director of the Harp Centre Australia, a not-for-profit organization dedicated to promoting the harp in Australia.

In February 2011 she went to Antarctica as the recipient of an Antarctic Arts Division Fellowship, commemorating the centenary of the first Australasian Antarctic Expedition, becoming the first professional musician ever to perform in that continent. She developed a multimedia performance entitled "Alice in Antarctica" that was live-streamed directly from Mawson Station and later performed around Australia and internationally.

Giles performs in master classes internationally, and has been a juror at numerous important harp competitions. She was the Chair and the Artistic Director of the 2014 World Harp Congress in Sydney in July 2014.

She is a member of the Australian World Orchestra.

Giles was made a Member of the Order of Australia (AM) in the 2017 Queen's Birthday Honours for "significant service to the performing arts as a harpist, educator and mentor, and through contributions to Australia's musical landscape".

== Personal life ==
She is the daughter of Rosemary Madigan. She and her husband and children live on a property near Yass, New South Wales.
