= Sylvia Meyer =

American musician

Sylvia Meyer (November 23, 1907 – March 26, 2005) was an American harpist who became the first female member of the National Symphony Orchestra. She was a founding member of the World Harp Congress.

== Early life ==
Sylvia Meyer was born in Madison, Wisconsin, the child of Balthasar H. Meyer, an interstate commerce commissioner. She started playing the harp at age seven, choosing the instrument because her mother had bought a harp at an estate sale. She studied music at the Academy of the Holy Cross near Washington, D.C., and graduated from the Western High School in 1924. She attended the University of Wisconsin from where she graduated Phi Beta Kappa in geology. She also was a graduate of the Peabody Institute, a conservatory associated with the Johns Hopkins University, from where she received a teacher's certificate and the Artist's Diploma, the first harpist to do so.

== Career ==
Meyer trained at the harp with Carlos Salzedo in Camden, Maine, who taught her a style of aggressive playing. She played with the Baltimore Symphony for three seasons. Salzedo recommended her to Hans Kindler, the then conductor of the National Symphony Orchestra (NSO), which she joined in 1933. Meyer also performed concerts for the National Concert Association. She received praise for her performance of Giovanni Battista Pescetti's Sonata in C Minor, a technically challenging piece, as well as compositions by Salzedo designed to exploit the full potential of the harp. In 1939, she joined the Mary Washington College in Fredericksburg, Virginia as a part-time instructor in harp.

In 1966, Meyer needed plastic surgery to restore a fingertip after a gardening accident. She recovered, but was forced to leave the NSO following her long medical absence. Meyer was acclaimed for her rendition of Alberto Ginastera's Harp Concerto, op. 25 in 1968. Meyer received the Orah Ashley Lamke Distinguished Alumna Award in 1970 from Mu Phi Epsilon. In 1998, she was given the Elizabeth Mathias Award by the same fraternity for her achievements in music. Meyer was part of the founding committee of the World Harp Congress in 1981.

A caricature of Meyer by Aline Fruhauf dating to the years of her performing career is owned by Georgetown University.

== Later life ==
Sylvia Meyer retired from her musical career at age 61. She was married to Oliver Gasch, a former judge, for 56 years until his death in 1999. The couple had a son together. Meyer died at the Suburban Hospital in Bethesda, Maryland on March 26, 2005, from pneumonia. Her papers are held in the International Harp Archives.
