= Alice Chalifoux =

American harpist (1908–2008)

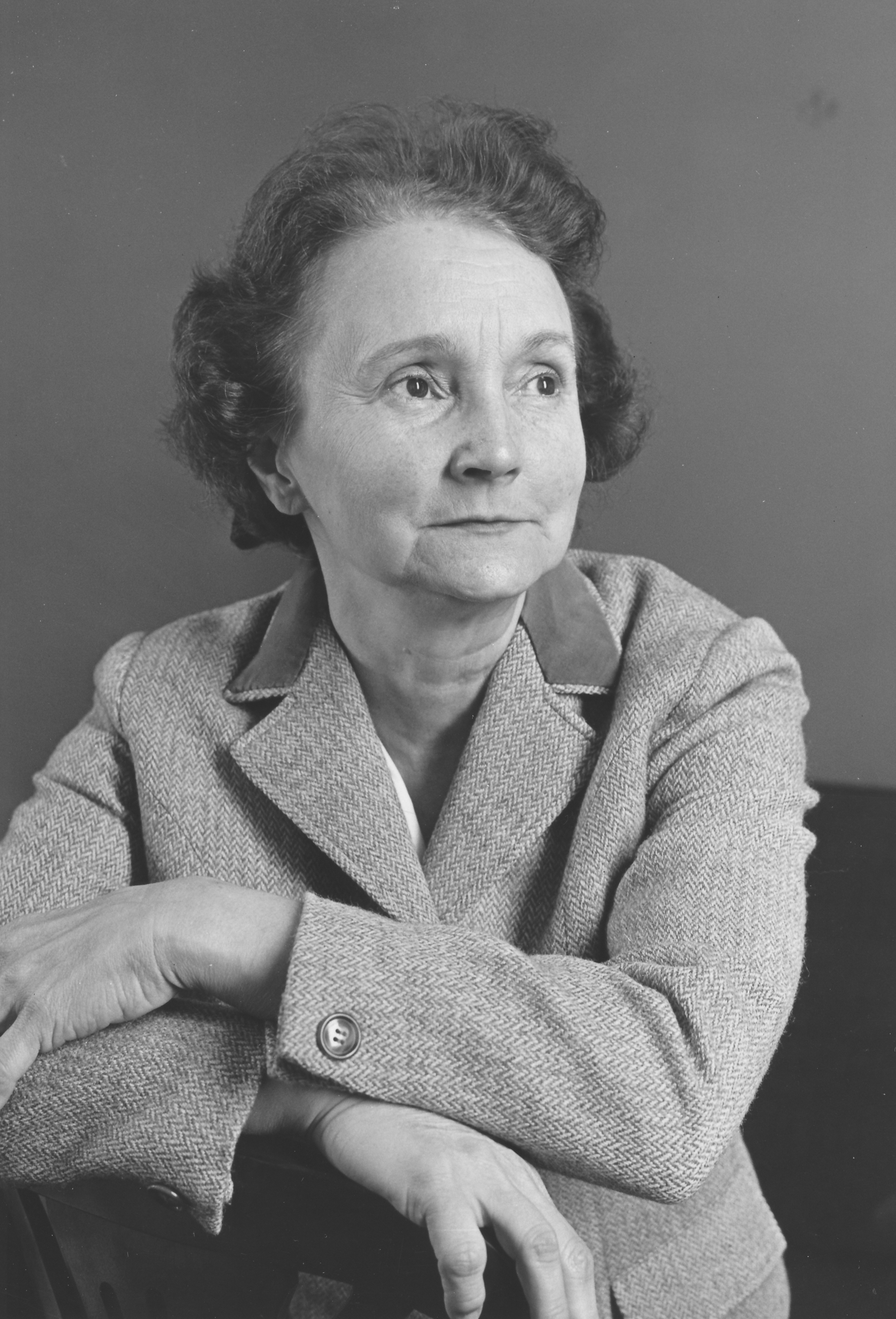

Background information
- Born: January 22, 1908; Birmingham, Alabama, United States
- Died: July 31, 2008 (age 100)
- Occupations: Musician, music teacher
- Instrument: Harp
- Formerly of: Cleveland Orchestra

Alice Chalifoux (January 22, 1908 – July 31, 2008) was the principal harpist with the Cleveland Orchestra from 1931 to 1974 and was its only female member for twelve years. Chalifoux learned to play the harp from her mother, studying music at local schools before studying under Carlos Salzedo at the Curtis Institute of Music. She was an authority on his music and took over the Salzedo Summer Harp Colony after his death. She had a reputation as a specialist in orchestral harp technique and a master teacher. She taught at the Cleveland Institute of Music, the Oberlin Conservatory of Music, the Baldwin-Wallace Conservatory of Music, and the University of Maryland School of Music. She continued teaching harp until her death in 2008, at the age of 100. Chalifoux received two honorary degrees for her work. In her personal life, Chalifoux married John Gordon Rideout in 1937 and had one daughter.

== Education ==
Chalifoux was the youngest of four children born to the merchant and violinist Oliver Chalifoux and his wife, harpist Alice Hallé Chalifoux, in Birmingham, Alabama. After learning to play from her mother and continuing as a music student in local schools, Chalifoux was accepted as a student of Carlos Salzedo at the Curtis Institute of Music in Philadelphia, Pennsylvania. She owned Salzedo's house and the Salzedo Summer Harp Colony after his death in 1961. She received two honorary degrees in the early 1990s: a doctor of fine arts from Bowdoin College and a doctor of musical arts from the Cleveland Institute of Music.

== Career ==
Through her work with the Cleveland Orchestra, under the direction of conductors such as Erich Leinsdorf, Artur Rodziński, George Szell, Pierre Boulez, and Lorin Maazel, Chalifoux quickly became recognized as a specialist in orchestral technique. Her recording of Debussy's Danses sacrée et profane with the Cleveland Orchestra received a Grammy Award in 1970. She was the principal harpist for the Cleveland Orchestra from 1931 to 1974. A lack of accommodations for women led her to change clothes inside of her harp trunk when necessary. She was reportedly accepted by her male colleagues at the Cleveland Orchestra, respected as a great harpist, and did her own harp repairs.

Chalifoux was a dedicated proponent of the harp method developed by Salzedo and established herself as a distinguished pedagogue through her extensive tenure at the Cleveland Institute of Music, Oberlin Conservatory of Music, and Baldwin-Wallace Conservatory of Music. Following her retirement from these institutions, she relocated to the Washington, DC metropolitan area to be near her daughter, Alyce, and assumed the position of artist-in-residence at the University of Maryland School of Music. Renowned as an authority on Salzedo's music, she was also highly skilled in resolving fingering challenges and diagnosing and correcting physical issues related to harp technique. Her editing of orchestra parts was invaluable to her profession. Chalifoux was the primary instructor at the Salzedo Summer Harp Colony, in Camden, Maine, after the death of Salzedo in 1961. The harp colony was considered the "harp center of the universe". Both beginners and established harpists would travel to Camden to study under Chalifoux.

Chalifoux was once a guest on The Tonight Show Starring Johnny Carson.

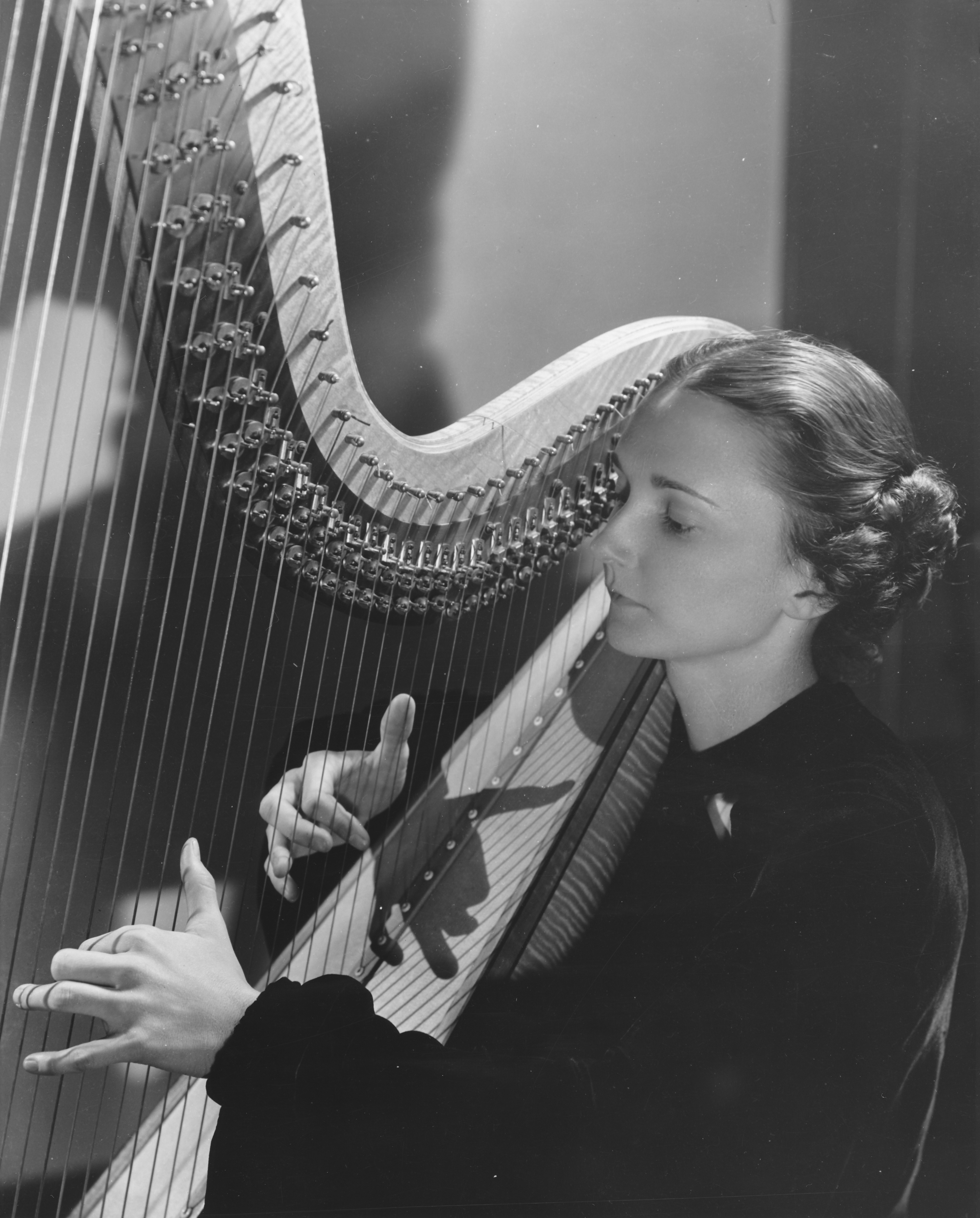
Alice Chalifoux with her harp

== Personal life ==
Chalifoux married John Gordon Rideout in 1937 and had a daughter, Alyce. Her husband died in 1951. Chalifoux continued to teach harpists until she died in 2008 at the age of 100.

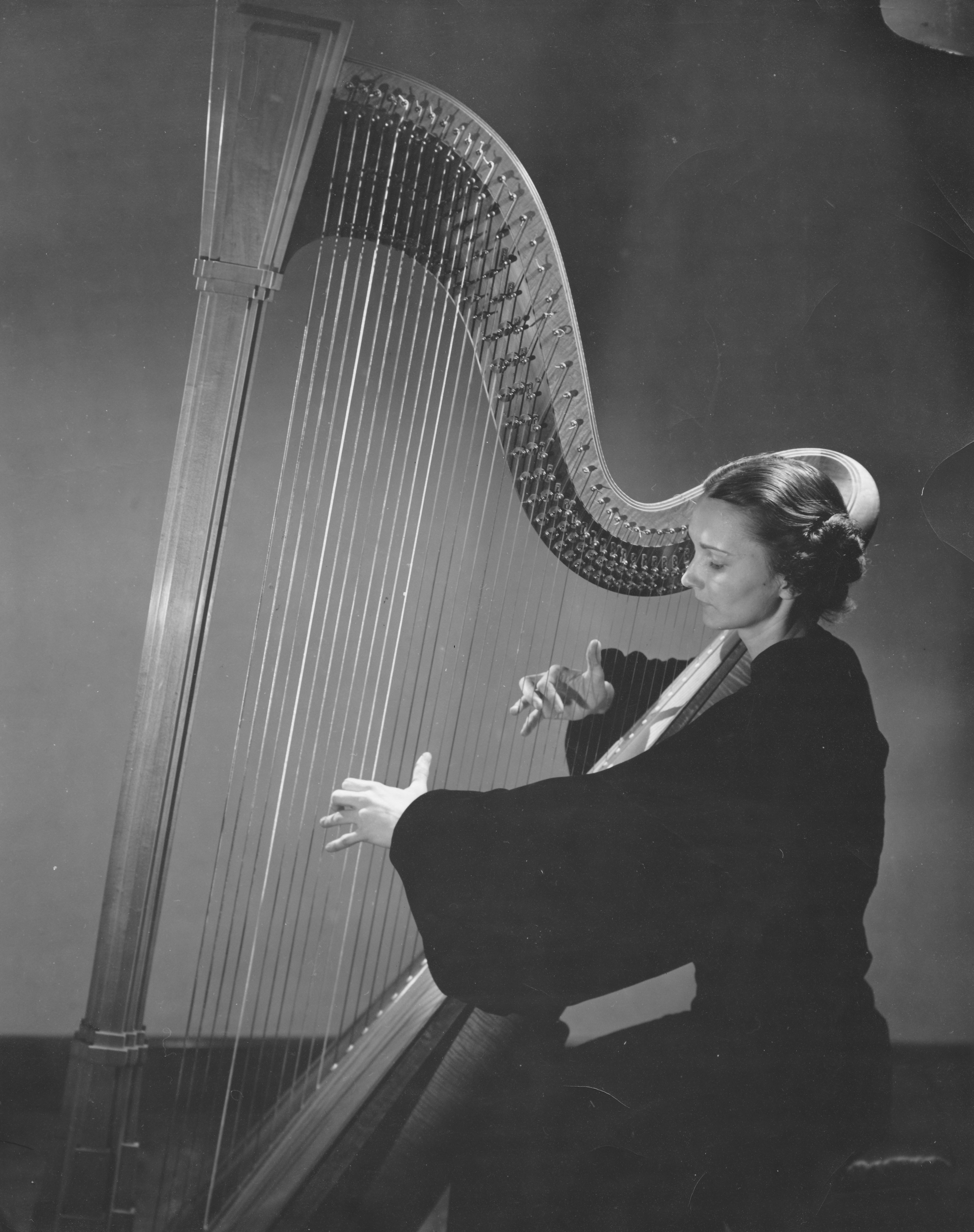
Alice Chalifoux in 1937

== Students ==
According to Kraus's book on the Cleveland Orchestra under George Szell, she considers Chalifoux one of the best harpists and harp teachers from the United States. Her students continue to hold posts with major orchestras and important teaching positions.

- Ann Hobson Pilot, Boston Symphony Orchestra, New England Conservatory, Boston University, Tanglewood
- Yolanda Kondonassis, former faculty: Oberlin Conservatory, Cleveland Institute of Music; major recording artist for Telarc
- Jacquelyn Bartlett, Indianapolis Symphony Orchestra, North Carolina Symphony, University of North Carolina School of the Arts, Fire Pink Trio
- Anna Maria Mendieta, Sacramento Philharmonic
- Doug Rioth, San Francisco Symphony
- Alice Giles, International soloist, first prizewinner in the 8th Israel International Harp Competition
- Mary Bircher, Cleveland Institute, Omaha Symphony Orchestra, University of Nebraska-Lincoln
- Anastasia Pike: Teachers College, Columbia University
- Elisabeth Remy Johnson, Principal Harpist, Atlanta Symphony Orchestra
- Trina Struble, teacher's chair in the Cleveland Orchestra
- Lisa Wellbaum, Chalifoux's successor as principal harp in Cleveland
- Katie Wychulis, principal harp of the Lincoln Symphony, Boulder Philharmonic and Sioux City Symphony and faculty of the Glen Korff School of Music
