= National Symphony Orchestra =

Orchestra in Washington, DC

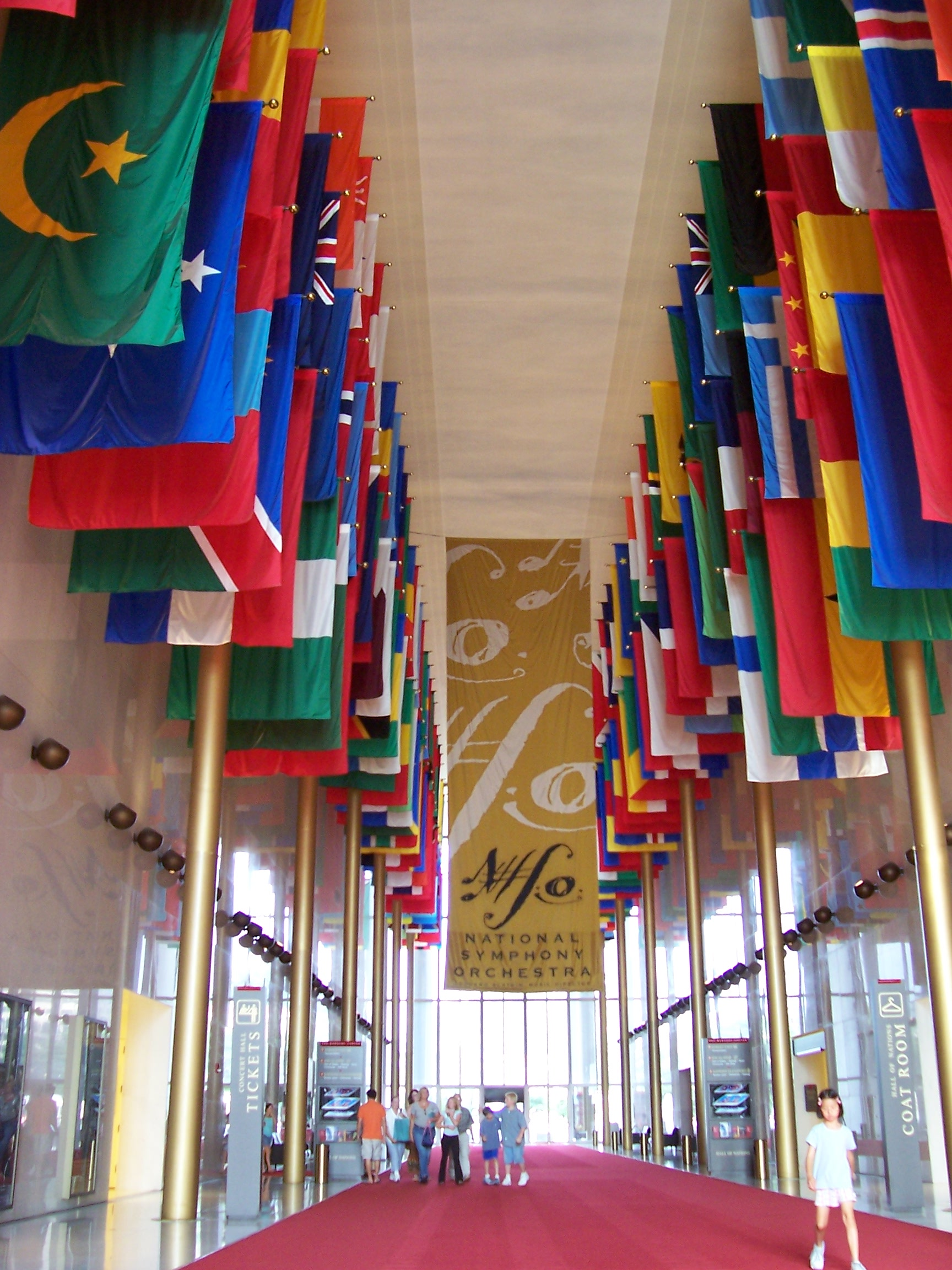
- Banner of the NSO, Kennedy Center, Washington, D.C.
- Short name: NSO
- Founded: 1930; 96 years ago
- Location: Washington, D.C., United States
- Concert hall: John F. Kennedy Center for the Performing Arts
- Music director: Gianandrea Noseda
- Website: www.kennedy-center.org/nso

The National Symphony Orchestra (NSO) is an American symphony orchestra based in Washington, D.C. Founded in 1930 by cellist Hans Kindler, its principal performing venue is the John F. Kennedy Center for the Performing Arts.

The NSO regularly participates in events of national and international importance, including performances for ceremonial state affairs, presidential inaugurations and official holiday celebrations, including the annual National Memorial Day Concert in May and A Capitol Fourth concerts on July 4. The NSO presents a 52-week season of approximately 175 concerts each year. These include classical subscription series, pops concerts, and educational programs.

== History ==
After an initial ad-hoc concert on January 31, 1930, the NSO was officially organized by the Dutch-born American cellist Hans Kindler in 1931, and remained under his direction until 1949. In the early years, Kindler often relied on unemployed local talent or borrowed musicians from other mid-Atlantic cities. During Kindler's tenure, the musicians received a salary of $40.00 per week, covering three rehearsals and one concert, for five months of the year. The first female member of the NSO was harpist Sylvia Meyer, who joined in 1933.

Antal Doráti became music director in 1970. He stood down as music director after 7 years. A deteriorating relationship with the NSO board of directors marked his tenure. Mstislav Rostropovich succeeded Doráti as music director in 1977. In 1986, the NSO became the artistic affiliate of the Kennedy Center, where it had presented a concert season annually since the Center opened in 1971. Rostropovich concluded his NSO tenure in 1994.

Leonard Slatkin was music director of the NSO from 1996 to 2008. One report spoke of tensions between the conductor and the orchestra, and mentioned criticisms of Slatkin's programming and rehearsal styles. With the 2006–2007 season, Iván Fischer became the principal guest conductor of the orchestra. On April 13, 2007, the orchestra announced the appointment of Fischer as the orchestra's principal conductor as of the 2008–2009 season, for two seasons.

In September 2008, the NSO announced the appointment of Christoph Eschenbach as the orchestra's sixth music director, effective with the 2010–2011 season, for an initial contract of four years. During his tenure, NSO released an album in 2011, including selections of their live performance from their program honoring the 50th anniversary of U.S. president John F. Kennedy's inauguration. In September 2011, the orchestra extended Eschenbach's contract through the 2014–2015 season. In March 2014, his contract was extended through the 2016–2017 season. Eschenbach concluded his tenure as NSO music director at the end of the 2016–2017 season, and subsequently became the NSO's conductor laureate.

In 2011, Gianandrea Noseda first guest-conducted the NSO, and returned in November 2015 for an additional guest engagement. In January 2016, the NSO announced the appointment Noseda as its next music director, effective with the 2017–2018 season. He served as music director-designate in the 2016–2017 season, and his initial contract as music director was for 4 seasons. In September 2018, the NSO announced the extension of Noseda's contract through the 2024–2025 season.

The COVID-19 pandemic caused cancellation of full-scale live in-person concerts, and led to a local community outreach programme in 2020 called "NSO in Your Neighborhood (IYN)". Through this program, NSO held performances mostly outdoors in front of frontline health workers. In June 2022, the NSO announced a further extension of Noseda's contract through the 2026–2027 season. In January 2023, the NSO announced the appointment of Jean Davidson as its next executive director, effective April 1, 2023.

On the morning of September 27, 2024, at 11:00 local time, the musicians of the NSO initiated a work stoppage, the first such action since 1978, after a breakdown in labour negotiations. The management and the musicians reached a settlement by 14:30 local time that same day.

Singer-songwriter Ben Folds served as artistic advisor from 2017 until his resignation in 2025. In March 2025, the NSO announced its most recent contract extension for Noseda, through 2031.

In February 2026, President Donald Trump announced that the Kennedy Center would close on July 4, 2026, for a two-year renovation. The surprise announcement disrupted long-planned schedules and forced arts organizations to seek new venues. The orchestra typically plays about 175 events a year and had laid out its 2026–27 schedule more than a year ago. In March 2026, Davidson announced she leaving her position as executive director to begin leading the Wallis Annenberg Center for the Performing Arts in Beverly Hills, California, in May. In August, the orchestra announced a season of 60 concerts at a variety of venues in the Washington area together with a national 5 state tour.

== Recordings ==
Kindler and the NSO made several 78-rpm recordings for RCA Victor, including the two Roumanian Rhapsodies by George Enescu. (Much later, in 1960, the NSO would perform the first of these works under the baton of the visiting Romanian conductor George Georgescu, a close associate and favored exponent of the composer.) One of the more unusual RCA recordings with the orchestra was of the complete ballet music from the opera King Henry VIII by Camille Saint-Saëns, one of the very few recordings conducted by Walter Damrosch. Years later, Howard Mitchell made a series of stereophonic recordings with the orchestra for RCA. Antal Doráti recorded with the orchestra for Decca Records. Mstislav Rostropovich made recordings with the orchestra for Deutsche Grammophon. The orchestra returned to RCA Victor under Leonard Slatkin, until RCA abandoned new classical recordings.

In July 2022, the NSO announced the formation of its own record label, to feature commercial releases of selected live performances.

== National Symphony Orchestra Summer Music Institute ==
The National Symphony Orchestra Summer Music Institute (NSO SMI) is the orchestra's flagship national training program for young musicians. Founded in 1984 as part of the NSO’s educational initiatives, it has developed into the preeminent national youth orchestra program in the United States, admitting both advanced high school and college musicians. Its structure and selectivity place it alongside world renowned international programs such as the National Youth Orchestra.

SMI is offered at no cost to participants. All accepted musicians receive a full merit-based scholarship covering tuition, housing, and instruction through the John F. Kennedy Center for the Performing Arts. In addition, many students receive further need-based support that may include meal stipends and round-trip travel assistance.

Participants are selected by competitive audition and take part in a four-week curriculum of private lessons, master classes, chamber ensembles, and full orchestra rehearsals led by musicians of the National Symphony Orchestra. The program also offers seminars in audition preparation, musicianship, and career development. Performances by both chamber groups and the full institute orchestra are presented throughout the summer, many of which are free and open to the public.

Chamber music is a core component of the institute. Students rehearse and perform small-ensemble works under the guidance of National Symphony Orchestra and Washington National Opera Orchestra musicians. A representative example of chamber music from the program may be viewed below, coached by NSO Principal Violist Daniel Foster in the 2025 NSO SMI Program:

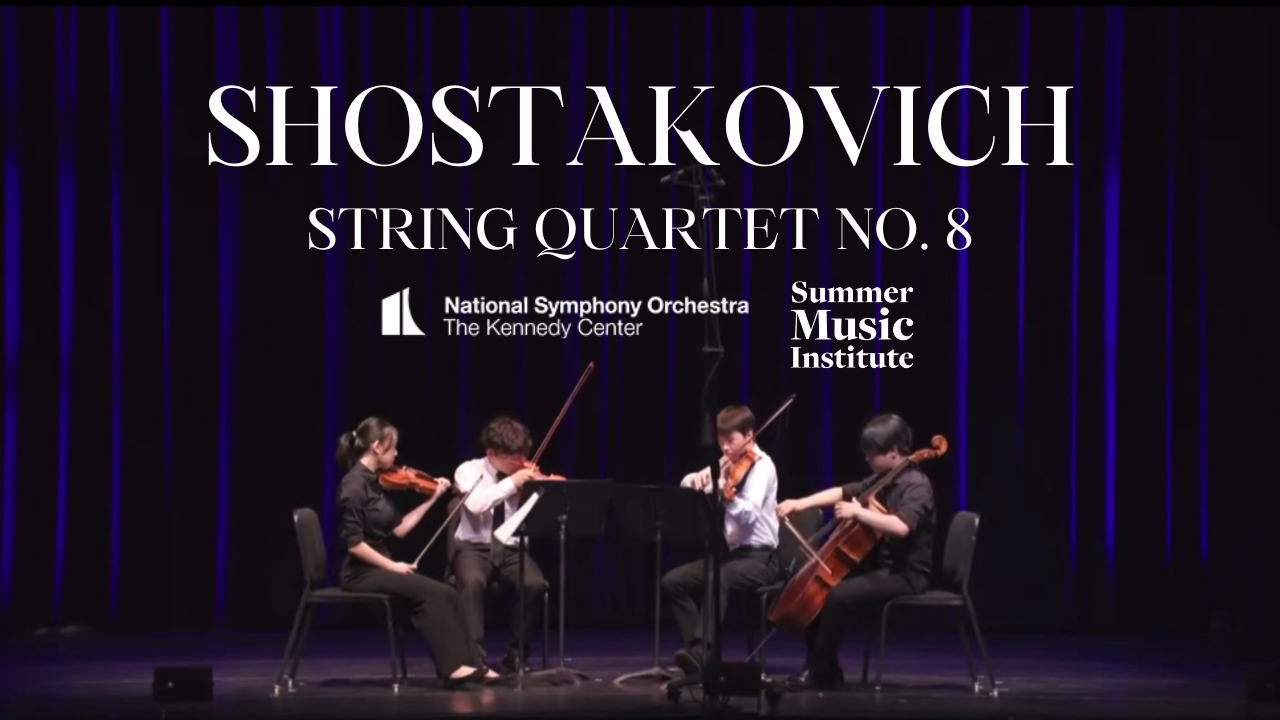
Chamber music performance by SMI participants. Video link

Many alumni of the program continue their studies at major American conservatories, including the Juilliard School, the Curtis Institute of Music, and the Colburn School. The institute is also well known for producing students who pursue dual-degree pathways that combine conservatory training with academic study, such as the Harvard–New England Conservatory dual program and the Columbia–Juilliard exchange, a trend often attributed to the program's environment at the John F. Kennedy Center in the epicenter of Washington, D.C., where music education intersects with a broader ecosystem of public service, policy, and cultural institutions.

Admission to NSO SMI is merit-based, and political affiliation is not considered in the selection process. Students from a wide range of backgrounds and viewpoints participate in and thrive at NSO SMI and within the Kennedy Center community.

== Additional activities ==
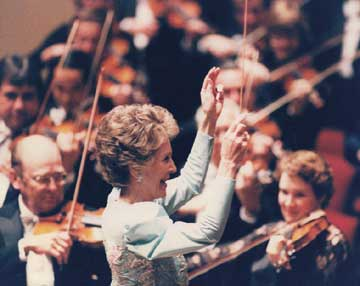
First Lady Nancy Reagan conducts the National Symphony Orchestra, 1987

Through the John and June Hechinger Commissioning Fund for New Orchestral Works, the NSO has commissioned more than 50 works, including cycles of fanfares and encores. During his tenure, Slatkin founded the National Conducting Institute in 2000.

As well, the NSO has presented The National Symphony Orchestra American Residencies for the John F. Kennedy Center for the Performing Arts. This venture encompasses sharing all elements of classical symphonic music with a specific region of the United States, exploring the diversity of musical influences, and giving the region a musical voice in the nation's center for the performing arts through exchanges, training programs, and commissions. Established in 1992, the project has taken the NSO to fifteen states.

== Music directors ==
- Hans Kindler (1931–1949)
- Howard Mitchell (1949–1970)
- Antal Doráti (1970–1977)
- Mstislav Rostropovich (1977–1994)
- Leonard Slatkin (1996–2008)
- Iván Fischer (principal conductor; 2008–2010)
- Christoph Eschenbach (2010–2017)
- Gianandrea Noseda (2017–present)

== See also ==
- Symphony orchestra
- Washington National Opera
- John F. Kennedy Center for the Performing Arts
- National Youth Orchestra
- National Memorial Day Concert
- A Capitol Fourth
