= American Harp Society =

Non-profit organization

The American Harp Society, Inc. (AHS) is a non-profit organization. Founded in 1962, the AHS is an organization of harpists with more than 3,000 members from all 50 states and 20 countries. The organization is currently led by President Lynne Aspnes, Chairman of the Board Elaine Litster, and Executive Director Kathryn McManus.

The Library of Congress is home to the AHS Repository and the Harold B. Lee Library at Brigham Young University is home to the International Harp Archives which contains the AHS Archives, AHS Lending Library and Interview Series.

== National events ==
Every summer the American Harp Society hosts national gatherings. The National Conference, held in even-numbered years, features concerts by artists from around the world, workshops on wide-ranging topics, master classes with teachers, and scholarly lectures, as well as an exhibit hall with an array of harps and related items. The Summer Institute, held in odd-numbered years, focuses on the student harpist with workshops, master classes, and concerts by performers and pedagogues. The Summer Institute is held in conjunction with AHS National Competition, where young harpists compete for awards and scholarships in five divisions: Junior, Intermediate I, Intermediate II, Advanced, and Young Professional.

== Publications ==
The AHS publishes The American Harp Journal bi-annually. Articles in the journal include such topics as biographies of major past and present harpists, bibliographies, harp construction and maintenance, historical studies, listings and reviews of publications and recordings, educational content for students and teachers, and coverage of AHS news and events. The AHS formerly published the AHS Teachers Forum, an annual journal dedicated to harp pedagogy from 1997 to 2004, and Unkle Knuckles’ Knews, a magazine for young harpists from 1994 to 2007.

== Founding Committee ==
- Marcel Grandjany, Chairman
- S. Mario DeStefano
- Mildred Dilling
- Eileen Malone
- Lucile Rosenbloom
- Alberto Salvi
- Edward Vito
- Bernard Zighera

== Past Presidents ==
- Lucile Lawrence (1962–1966)
- Lucien Thomson (1966–1968)
- Catherine Gotthoffer (1968–1970)
- Suzanne Balderston (1970–1972)
- Catherine Gotthoffer (1972–1976)
- Ann Stockton (1976–1980)
- Pearl Chertok (1980–1981)
- Patricia Wooster (1981–1986)
- Sally Maxwell (1986–1988)
- John B. Escosa, Sr. (1988–1991)
- Molly E. Hahn (1991–1994)
- Sally Maxwell (1994–1998)
- Lucy Clark Scandrett (1998–2002; 2006–2010)
- William Lovelace (2002–2006)
- Delaine Leonard (2010–2014)
- Ann Yeung (2014–2016)
- Cheryl Dungan Cunningham (2016–2018)
- Lynne Aspnes (2018–2022)
- Angela Schwarzkopf (2022–2024)

== Past Chairmen of the Board ==
- John Blyth (1964–1968)
- Ann Stockton (1968–1974)
- Charles Kleinstuber (1974–1975)
- Mario Falcao (1975–1979)
- Sylvia Meyer (1979–1982)
- Margaret Ling (1982–1983)
- Faith Carman (1983–1986)
- Ruth Papalia (1986–1988)
- Lynne Wainwright Palmer (1988–1989)
- Faith Carman (1989–1994)
- David Kolacny (1994–1995)
- Barbara Weiger Lepke-Sims (1995–1998)
- Jan Bishop (1998–2002)
- Linda Wood Rollo (2002–2006)
- Karen Lindquist (2006–2010)
- Felice Pomeranz (2010–2014)
- Cheryl Dungan Cunningham (2014–2016)
- Elaine Litster (2016–2020)
- Kela Walton (2020-2024)
