= List of Saint Mary's College of Maryland people =

The following is a list of people connected to St. Mary's College of Maryland.

== Alumni ==
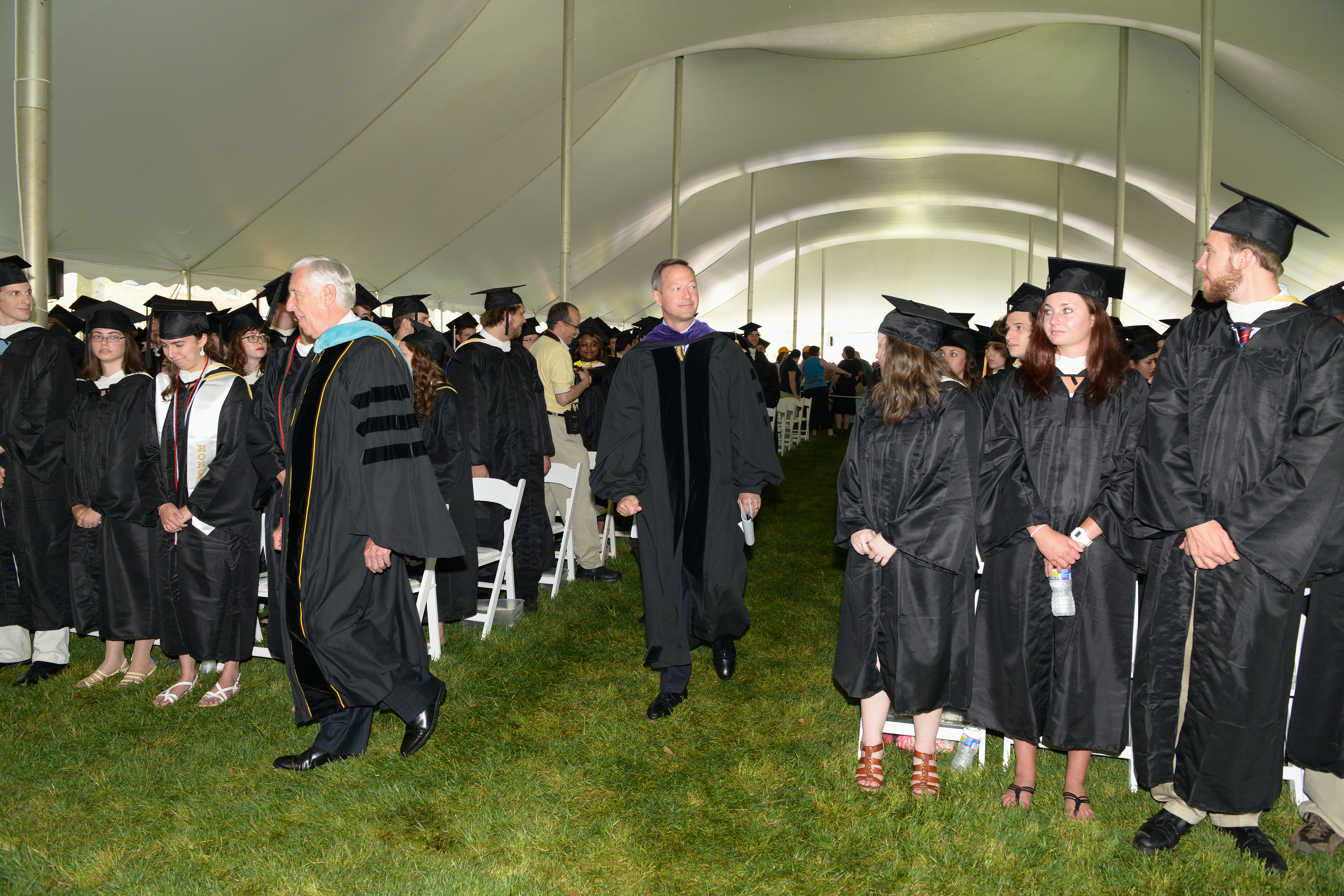
Congressman Steny Hoyer – House majority leader, U.S. House of Representatives, Congress, (2007–2011); U.S. representative for Maryland's 5th congressional district (since 1981); and Maryland Governor Martin O'Malley at the St Mary's College Commencement Ceremony in 2013

- Kay Aldridge (1934) – actor, model, star of Perils of Nyoka
- Julie Croteau – Women's Major League Baseball pioneer, inducted into the Baseball Hall of Fame
- Ellen Hackl Fagan (born June 13, 1960) – abstract artist and curator
- David Fraser-Hidalgo (1992) – member of the Maryland House of Delegates, representing District 15, sits on the Montgomery County Chamber of Commerce and the Hispanic Chamber of Commerce
- Jesse Kirkland (2011) – Olympic sailor, 49er racing dinghies
- Matthew Schissler (1993) – founder of Cord Blood America, Inc., a pioneer in harvesting non-embryonic stem cells for medical use; and Pyrenees Investments; semi-finalist for the 2008 Ernst & Young Entrepreneur of the Year Award
- Brandon Scott – politician, president of the Baltimore City Council and 52nd Mayor of Baltimore
- John F. Slade III (1964) – associate judge with the 4th District Court of Maryland, former member of Maryland House of Delegates
- Paul Reed Smith (1978) – luthier, founder of PRS Guitars
- Scott Steele (1981) – Olympic silver medalist in sailboarding

== Faculty ==
- Jeffrey J. Byrd – microbiologist, science editor, author, editor od The Complete Idiot's Guide to Microbiology, editor-in-chief of the Journal of Microbiology and Biology Education, formerly called the Journal of Microbiology Education
- Lucille Clifton – former Poet Laureate of Maryland; two-time Pulitzer Prize finalist; deceased
- Norton Dodge – economist, collector of dissident Soviet era art; smuggled thousands of Soviet dissident paintings, prints and sculptures out of communist Russia over a number of years and at great risk to his own life; amassed one of the largest collections of Soviet-era art outside the Soviet Union; deceased
- Mary Adele France – first president of the junior college; convinced the Maryland legislature that women attaining the right to vote made it rational to expand the former St. Mary's Female Seminary into a junior college, in 1927; science and math teacher at the school
- David Froom – composer, Guggenheim Fellow, twice honored by the American Academy of Arts and Letters (Ives Scholarship, Academy Award for lifetime achievement), first prize in the Kennedy Center Friedheim Awards, commissioned by the Fromm Foundation of Harvard and the Koussevitzky Foundation of the Library of Congress, published by ACA
- Michael Glaser – former Poet Laureate of Maryland; professor emeritus
- Earl Hofmann – painter, sculptor, educator; part of Baltimore's 20th-century realist art school, studied with and assisted Jacques Maroger at the Maryland Institute College of Art; considered a major part of the 20th-century Baltimore art scene before relocating to Southern Maryland; deceased
- James A. Kenney, III – judge of the Maryland Court of Special Appeals (1997–2007); Assistant State's Attorney in St. Mary's County, Maryland (1964–67); won the Maryland Leadership in Law Award in 2003; adjunct professor
- Jane Margaret O'Brien – St. Mary's College of Maryland's college's first female president (after it became a four-year college) and its fifth president overall (1996–2009)
- Juliana Geran Pilon – author of many books, including Notes from the other side of night, The UN: assessing Soviet abuses, The Bloody Flag: Post-Communist Nationalism in Eastern Europe: Spotlight on Romania, Why America Is Such a Hard Sell: Beyond Pride and Prejudice, Cultural Intelligence for Winning the Peace, Soulmates: Resurrecting Eve; director of the Center for Culture and Security at the Institute of World Politics in Washington, D.C.; former visiting professor
- Luis Enrique Sam Colop – Guatemalan/Native American linguist, lawyer, poet, writer, newspaper columnist, promoter of the K'iche' language and social activist; former Fulbright visiting scholar

== Fellows ==
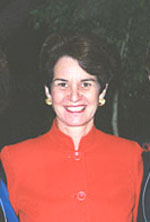
Kathleen Kennedy Townsend, former lieutenant governor of Maryland

Nitze senior fellows visit St. Mary's College several times throughout their assigned year to give lectures and meet with Nitze scholars and other St. Mary's students.

Previous Nitze fellows include:

- Nicholas Thompson (2010–2011)
- John Prendergast (2009–2010)
- T.R. Reid (2008–2009)
- Kathleen Kennedy Townsend (2007–2008)
- David E. Sanger (2006–2007)
- Edward P. Jones (2005–2006)
- Diane Rehm (2004–2005)
- Josiah Ober (2003–2004)
- Norine G. Johnson (2002–2003)
- Mario Livio (2001–2002)
- Wole Soyinka
- Lucille Clifton (spring 2001)
- Judge Thomas Penfield Jackson (fall 2000)
- Richard Lewontin (spring 2000)
- Ben Cardin (fall 1999)

== President ==
- Rhonda G. Phillips, 2025–present

== Trustees ==
- Benjamin C. Bradlee – vice president at large, The Washington Post
- Ben Cardin – U.S. senator from Maryland (2007–present); former speaker of the Maryland House of Delegates, (1979–1986); U.S. House of Representatives 1987–2007
- General Andrew J. Goodpaster, superintendent of the United States Military Academy at West Point, New York (1977–1981), NATO's Supreme Allied Commander, Europe (SACEUR) from July 1, 1969 and commander in chief of the United States European Command (CINCEUR) from May 5, 1969 until his retirement December 17, 1974
- Steny Hoyer – House majority leader U.S. House of Representatives, (2007–2011) U.S. representative for Maryland's 5th congressional district (since 1981)
- Thomas Penfield Jackson – presiding judge in the United States v. Microsoft case, former judge, United States District Court for the District of Columbia
- Gary Jobson – winner of the America's Cup for sailing; inducted into the America's Cup Hall of Fame in 1999; Emmy Award-winning sports commentator; author
- Anthony K. Lake – national security advisor under U.S. President Bill Clinton (1993–1997)
- Steven Muller – president, Johns Hopkins University (1972–1990)
- Paul Nitze – secretary of the Navy, 1963–1967, U.S. Arms Control negotiator (SALT talks), 1969–1976
- J. Frank Raley – state senator and state representative, president of St. Mary's College board for nearly three decades, advocate for education and economic development, environmentalist
- Stephanie Rawlings-Blake, mayor of Baltimore, 2010–present; president, Baltimore City Council, 2007–2010
- William Donald Schaefer – former governor of Maryland (1987–1995); former comptroller of Maryland (1999–2007)
