= Oliver Gasch =

American judge (1906–1999)

Senior Judge of the United States District Court for the District of Columbia
- In office November 30, 1981 – July 8, 1999

Judge of the United States District Court for the District of Columbia
- In office August 11, 1965 – November 30, 1981
- Appointed by: Lyndon B. Johnson
- Preceded by: Edward Allen Tamm
- Succeeded by: Thomas Penfield Jackson

United States Attorney for the District of Columbia
- In office 1956–1961
- Appointed by: Dwight D. Eisenhower
- Preceded by: Leo A. Rover
- Succeeded by: David Campion Acheson

Personal details
- Born: Oliver Gasch; May 4, 1906 Washington, D.C.
- Died: July 8, 1999 (aged 93) Washington, D.C.
- Party: Republican
- Education: Princeton University (A.B.); George Washington University Law School (LL.B.)

Oliver Gasch (May 4, 1906 – July 8, 1999) was a United States district judge of the United States District Court for the District of Columbia.

== Education and career ==
Born in Washington, D.C., Gasch received an Artium Baccalaureus degree from Princeton University in 1928 and a Bachelor of Laws from George Washington University Law School in 1932. He was in private practice in Washington, D.C. from 1932. He was an assistant corporation counsel for the city of Washington, D.C. from 1937 to 1953. He was general counsel to the Interstate Commission on the Potomac River Basin from 1940 to 1960. He served in the United States Army during World War II, from 1942 to 1946, achieving the rank of lieutenant colonel in the JAG Corps. He was a principal Assistant United States Attorney for the District of Columbia from 1953 to 1956, and was then the United States Attorney for the District of Columbia from 1956 to 1961. He was in private practice in Washington, D.C. from 1961 to 1965.

== Federal judicial service ==
On July 12, 1965, Gasch was nominated by President Lyndon B. Johnson to a seat on the United States District Court for the District of Columbia vacated by Judge Edward Allen Tamm. Gasch was confirmed by the United States Senate on August 11, 1965, and received his commission the same day. He assumed senior status on November 30, 1981. Gasch was a noted homophobe, noted in public when he twice called Joseph Steffan a "homo" in court proceedings during Steffan's federal case after Steffan, under pressure from United States Naval Academy leaders, resigned from the Academy. Gasch served in that capacity until his death on July 8, 1999, in Washington, D.C.

== Personal ==
Gasch was married to Sylvia Meyer, a harpist and the first woman member of the National Symphony Orchestra.

== See also ==
- Goldwater v. Carter

== Sources ==
- Interview with Oliver Gasch, District of Columbia Circuit Oral History Project

Legal offices
Preceded by Edward Allen Tamm	Judge of the United States District Court for the District of Columbia; 1965–1981	Succeeded by Thomas Penfield Jackson
