= Edward T. Lewis (college president) =

College president, poet, educator (1934–2025)

4th President of St. Mary's College of Maryland
- In office 1982–1996
- Other names: Edward Lewis, Ted Lewis
- Succeeded by: Jane Margaret O'Brien

President of Pennsylvania Academy of the Fine Arts
- In office 2007–2009
- Succeeded by: David R. Brigham

Personal details
- Born: May 29, 1934 Warwick, Rhode Island, U.S.
- Died: 11 December 2025 (aged 91)
- Education: North Carolina State University, Union College (BA), Boston University (MA), University of Denver (PhD)

Edward T. Lewis (29 May 1934 – 11 December 2025), more commonly known as Ted Lewis, was an American college administrator, educator, educational consultant, and poet. He served as the fourth president of St. Mary's College of Maryland, from 1982 to 1996; and served as president and CEO of the Pennsylvania Academy of the Fine Arts, from 2007 to 2009.

He was also a poet in his early life and has been widely published in literary magazines and newspapers.

== Early life and education ==
Lewis was born and raised in Warwick, Rhode Island, the son of an insurance salesman who only had an eight grade education. He initially did not maintain an interest in higher education, dropping out of North Carolina State University without graduating. He then joined the United States Army, and served for two years during the Korean War.

Later he completed an undergraduate degree at Union College and them went on to earn a master's degrees from Boston University, where he was a teaching fellow, and later received a doctorate from the University of Denver.

== Career ==
Lewis has also been a lifelong poet and has been widely published in newspapers and literary magazines. He has published more than 500 poems and essays. As a young man he was also involved in circles of some very well known poets. He later became a college educator and then moved on to work in college and university administration.

He was the fourth President St. Mary's College of Maryland, serving from 1982 to 1996. He was the president and CEO of Pennsylvania Academy of the Fine Arts from 2007 to 2009.

He is credited with leading St. Mary's College of Maryland to achieve official public honors college status, at the time only one of two such colleges in the nation. He is also credited with playing many key and decisive roles in transforming the school into a nationally prominent institution.

== Legacy ==
It was under the leadership of Lewis that the college rose to national prominence, securing the designation of "Public Honors College" for the school, which at the time was only one of two such public colleges in the nation. Lewis has been widely credited with overseeing an enormous advance of the institution in curriculum, faculty and student achievement, as well as national standing and recognition. The school has since attained numerous top national rankings.

He was awarded the "President's Trailblazer Award" by St. Mary's College of Maryland. The "Edward T. Lewis Poetry Award" was established in his honor at St. Mary's College of Maryland. The Lewis Quad, is a set of buildings on the campus of St. Mary's College of Maryland, which are named in his honor.

Lewis died on December 11, 2025, at the age of 91.

== Portraits of Lewis ==
- An oil painting of Lewis hangs in Calvert Hall, the main administration building of St. Mary's College of Maryland. It was painted by his son.
- There is a mixed-media, modern art portrait of Lewis, created at the Pennsylvania Academy of Fine Arts, where he served as President after his time of service at St. Mary's College. The portrait uses a technique sometimes called "digital impressionism".
