= Ellen Hackl Fagan =

American artist (born 1960)

- Born: Morristown, New Jersey, U.S.
- Education: Saint Mary’s College; Hartford Art School
- Occupations: Contemporary Artist; Curator; Gallerist

Ellen Hackl Fagan is an American abstract artist, curator and gallerist. She is the founder of ODETTA Gallery.

== Early life and education ==
Fagan was born in Morristown, New Jersey. She earned a Bachelor of Fine Arts in painting and photography from Saint Mary’s College in Notre Dame, Indiana in 1982. She graduated from Harford Art School in 2005 with a Master of Fine Arts in Painting and Interdisciplinary Media.

== Career ==
Fagan's work has been exhibited in the United States since the 1980s. In 1995, she curated Art and Text at the Stamford Museum and Nature Center. She founded ODETTA, a contemporary art virtual gallery in 2014.

Fagan is known for exploring synaesthesia in her work. In 2003, she developed the Reverse Color Organ, a tool that pairs colors with sounds. Early versions used image recognition to trigger audio, while later versions became a web and mobile platform that allowed users to assign sounds to colors and play them back as sequences.

Her solo exhibitions include Into The Blue Again at Real Art Ways, Hartford (2016–2017) and Helpless at Five Points Gallery, Torrington (2020). In 2017, she presented What Does Blue Sound Like? at the New York Public Library. Fagan has curated over 100 exhibitions including Speaking In Tongues at Art In Flux, Harlem (2012–2013), Who’s Afraid of Red, Yellow, and Blue? in Long Island City (2024), Blue Vibrations at Artisan Lofts, New York (2025), Night Shades at daphne:art, Bantam, Connecticut (2025), Lust for Rust at Atlantic Gallery, New York (2025), and Postcards to Venice in Mexico City and Venice (2024).

== Exhibitions ==
=== Selective solo exhibitions ===
- Helpless, Five Points Gallery, Torrington, 2020
- Solos 2019, Ely Center of Contemporary Art, New Haven, 2019
- What Does Blue Sound Like?, New York Public Library, 2017
- Into The Blue Again, Real Art Ways, Hartford, 2016–2017

=== Selective group exhibitions ===
- Painting by Proxy, Project: ARTspace, New York, 2021
- Reflection: Art of introspection and meditation, Northern Manhattan Arts Alliance, 2020
- London Calling Red, London Calling Collective, Harlem, New York, 2020
- Space/Craft, A.I.R. Gallery, Brooklyn, 2017
- Why Not?!, Housatonic Museum of Art, Bridgeport, 2008
