= Center for the Study of Democracy (St. Mary's College of Maryland) =

Research and education institute

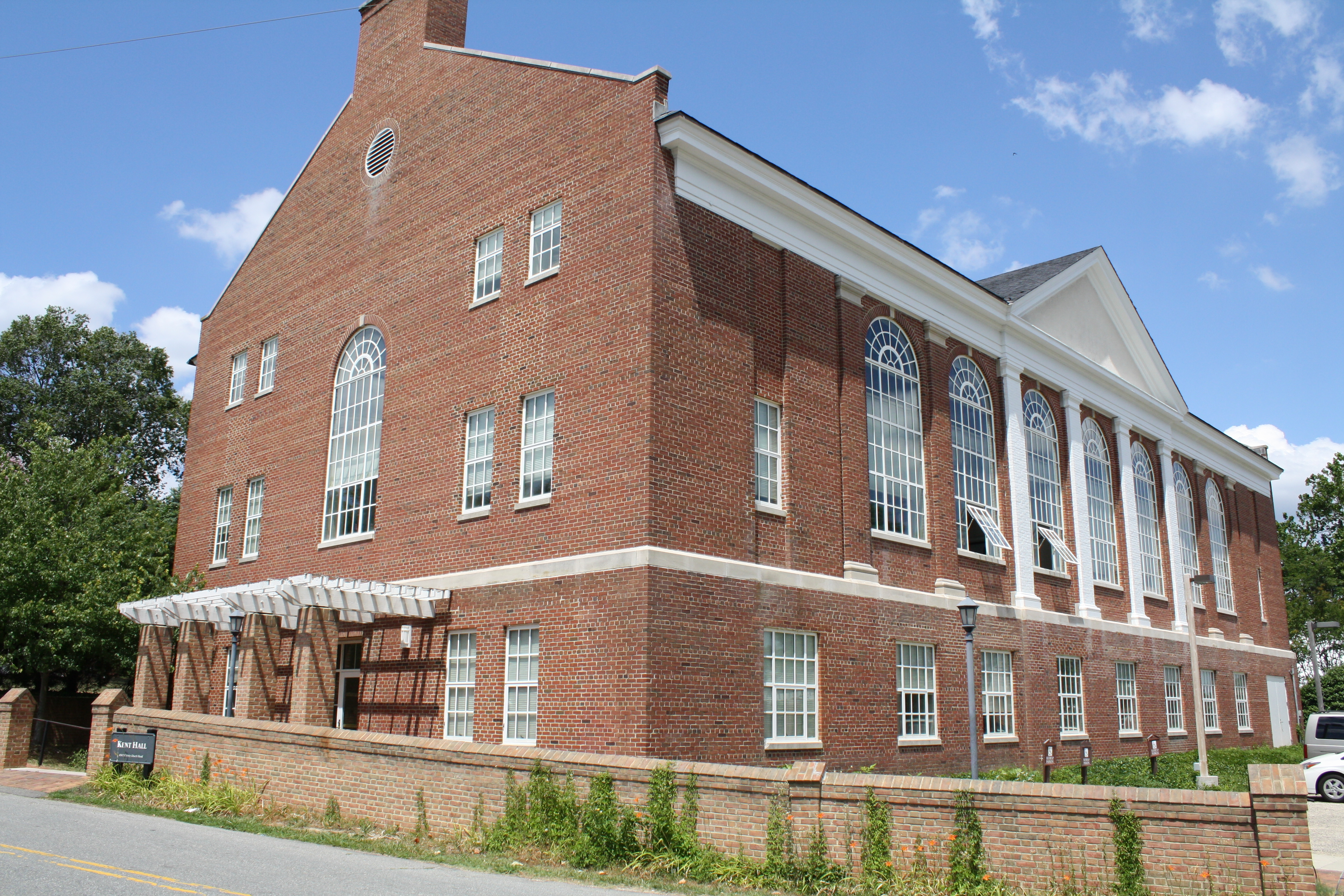
Kent Hall, home of the Center for the Study of Democracy on the campus of St. Mary's College of Maryland.

The Center for the Study of Democracy is a research and education institute at St. Mary's College of Maryland that focuses on the study of the history of emerging democracy in St. Mary's City, Maryland, the site of the state's first colonial capital and the location of many firsts in the development of democratic rights in North America; this work is done in conjunction with studies of modern democracies.

The mission of the Center for the Study of Democracy is to draw historical lessons and also inspiration from history, in order to increase understanding of the processes and principles that lead to the constructive maintenance and enhancement of democracy in the United States and around the world.

It does so by drawing on in-depth historical research, in conjunction with in-depth research on modern democracy-related issues and events, as they both relate to the process of democratization (establishing and improving democracy in all of its processes).

The center also sponsors numerous ongoing public forums and debates and seminars on these issues, many of which are covered by the media.

The debates also often include hosting and moderating major political leaders or policy leaders facing off against their opponents.

The Center for the Study of Democracy also strives to better understand historic setbacks and inconsistencies in the democratization process of historic Maryland and the United States, in order to better understand how these were eventually overcome; taking lessons from history that can then be applied to study of how democracy might be more constructively furthered today. The center Works in particular to increase understanding of how democracy may be enhanced in spite of the many obstacles that democratization often faces.

The center is jointly run by the Public Honors College, St. Mary's College of Maryland and its partner institution and neighbor, Historic St. Mary's City, one of the nation's preeminent historical and archeological research institutions.

== History ==
The Center for the Study of Democracy was established in 2002. Such notable people as former U.S. District Court judge Thomas Penfield Jackson, former National Security Adviser Anthony Lake former state Senator J. Frank Raley Jr. and former Maryland Governor William Donald Schaefer were very involved in its founding as well as being advisory board members.

So was former Washington Post Editor in Chief Benjamin C. Bradlee.

All of these men also served for years on the Board of Trustees of St. Mary's College of Maryland.

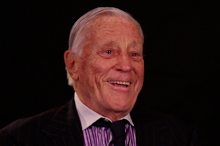
Benjamin C. Bradlee, former Editor in Chief of The Washington Post, was an active member of the advisory board member of the Center For the Study of Democracy

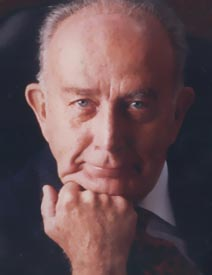
Maryland Governor William Donald Schaefer was an active advisory board member of the Center For the Study of Democracy for many years

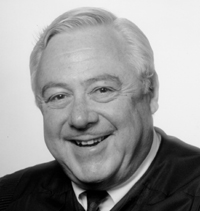
Former U.S. District Court judge Thomas Penfield Jackson, was involved in the founding of the Center for the Study of Democracy, also was active on the advisory board member of the Center For the Study of Democracy for many years

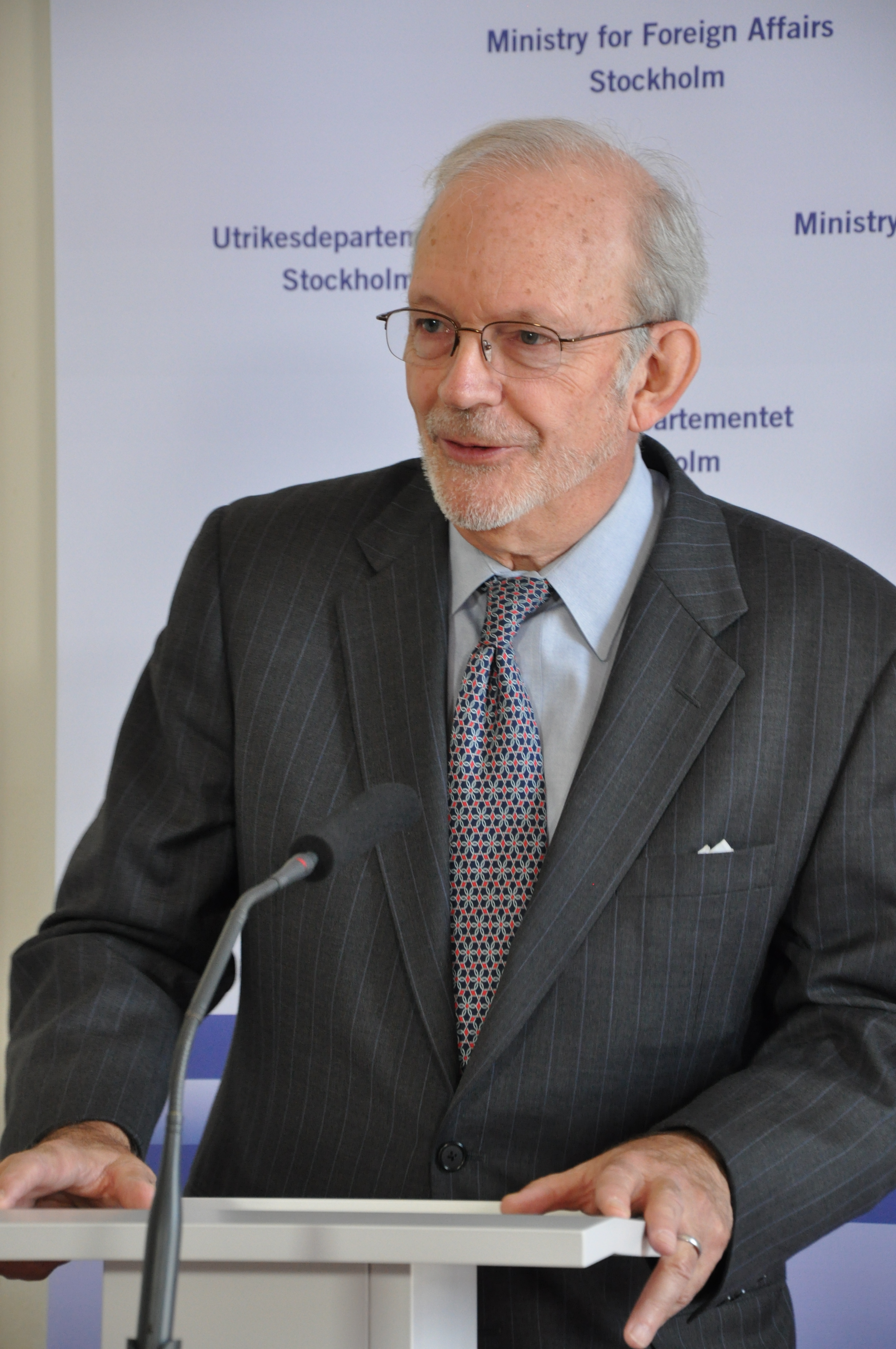
Anthony Lake, former U.S. National Security Adviser, was active on the advisory board member of the Center For the Study of Democracy for many years

== Events ==
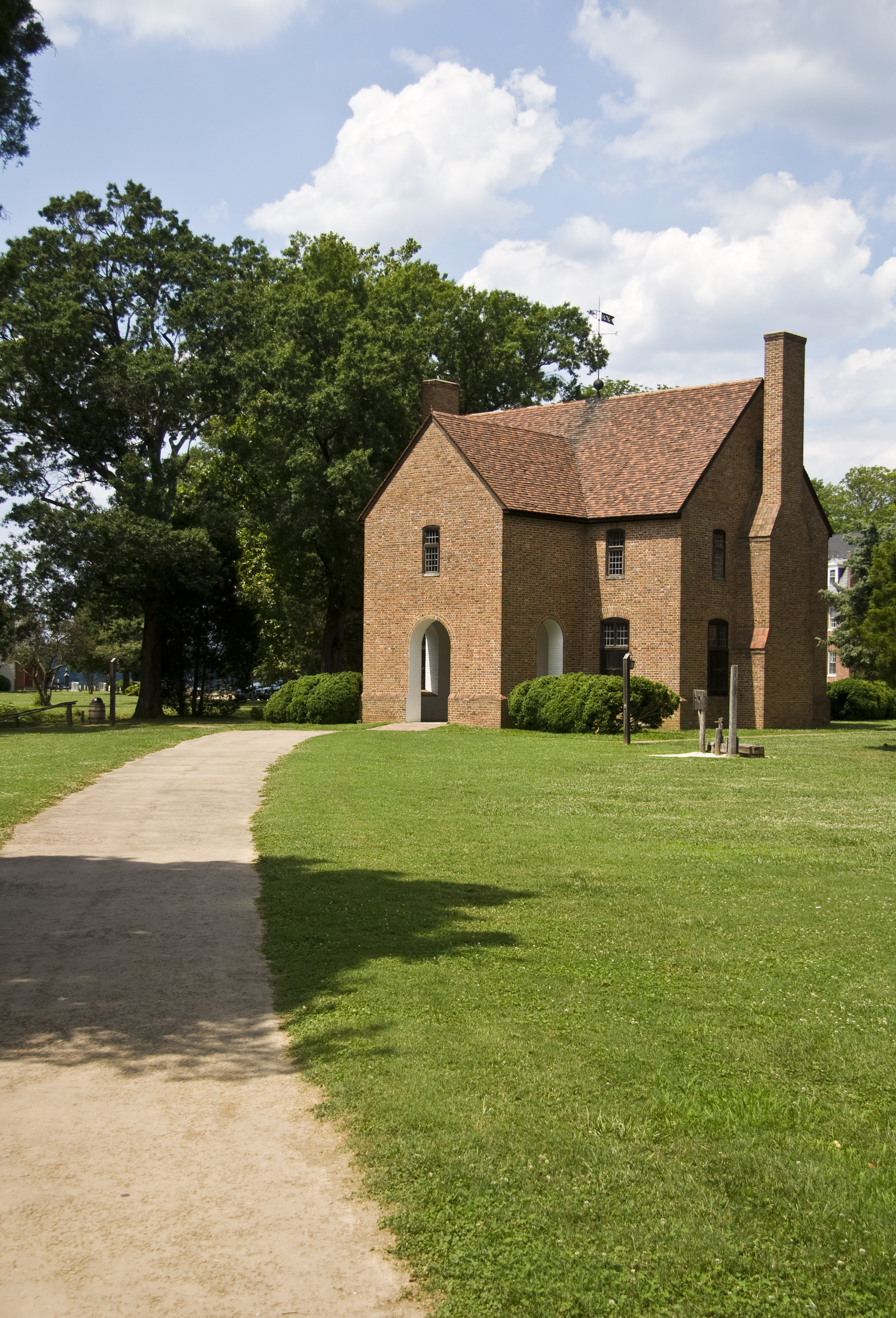
"The State House", reconstruction of the original 1676 Maryland Statehouse, Maryland's first capitol and the home of the Maryland colonial assembly. Stands on the original site. Historic St. Mary's City living history area, St. Mary's City Historic District, July 2009.

The Center for the Study of Democracy hosts over 25 educational events and/or public forums per year.

=== Political forums ===
The center hosts forums for state and national politicians on various key issues related to democratic governance, human rights, inclusion, lawmaking and security as it relates to democracy.

=== Lectures and seminars ===
The center sponsors and also directly provides many academic and also public lectures on both the historical and modern process of democratization. Learning from history (both recent history and older, foundational history) in order to better understand how democracy takes hold, and may be enhanced and spread constructively and effectively.

=== College educational programs ===
The center provides a minor in Democracy Studies at the St. Mary's College of Maryland. It also hosts numerous seminars and forums available to students.

It also provides special visiting lecturers and scholars, as well as providing special lectures to other college classes and programs.

=== Patuxent Defense Forum ===
The center also hosts the Patuxent Defense Forum, a gathering of high level experts on international security, including representatives from the academic community, foreign policy leadership, defense industry and military leadership. The purpose of the forum is to increase understanding related to the processes that lead to constructive maintenance and enhancement of democracy from a strategic defense point of view.

== Public Lectures ==
The center also sponsors and hosts public lectures on areas of study related to its mission:

- Peter S. Carmichael, Civil War Expert, Lecture on Slavery and the Civil War in the South

== Research ==
=== Historical research ===
The center supports and engages in research focused on examining the birth and emergence of various aspects of democracy in the earlier history of the state of Maryland and also the wider English speaking world. It then applies lessons and perspectives related to this history to modern day issues tied to the furtherance of democracy, both in the United States and in newly emerging democracies around the world.

=== Contemporary research ===
Extensive research is also done on issues related to the emergence of democracy in countries where it never previously existed or persisted; enhancement and furtherance of democracy in developed nations as well as furtherance of minority and women's participation in democracy worldwide.

== National Public Radio ==
On Maryland and Washington, D.C. public radio, the Center for the Study of Democracy is often sought out for expert commentary.

== Funding ==
The Institution is both publicly and privately funded. It is nonprofit and under the joint operation of the Public Honors College, St. Mary's College of Maryland (a Maryland state public school) and Historic St. Mary's City Maryland (a state research, historic interpretation and educational agency).

The organization has been funded by the National Endowment for the Humanities. It also has a history of gaining funding from other major granting institutions.

== Directorship ==
The current director of the center is Dr. Antonio Ugues Jr., a professor of Political Science at St. Mary's College of Maryland.

The prior director was Todd Eberly, also a professor at St. Mary's College of Maryland as well as being a noted Maryland political commentator. Eberly is often heard on several radio shows and is often quoted by the Washington Post, as well as writing his own columns.

== Notable advisory board members ==
- Jon Armajani Associate Professor, Department of Theology, College of St. Benedict and St. John's University
- Jennifer Cognard-Black Professor of English, St. Mary's College of Maryland
- Benjamin Bradlee Vice President-at-Large of The Washington Post, former President of Historic St. Mary's City Commission, and College Trustee
- Benjamin L. Cardin U.S. Senator and former College Trustee
- John P. Casciano President and chief executive officer, GrayStar Associates, LLC
- Rosann Catalano Roman Catholic theologian at the Institute for Christian and Jewish Studies
- Kenneth Cohen Assistant Professor of History, St. Mary's College of Maryland
- Helen Ginn Daugherty Professor of Sociology, St. Mary's College of Maryland
- Alan Dillingham Professor of Economics, St. Mary's College of Maryland
- Joseph W. Dyer Former Chief Strategy Officer, iRobot
- Todd Eberly Assistant Professor of Political Science and former acting director of the Center for the Study of Democracy
- Regina Faden Executive Director, Historic St. Mary's City
- Bonnie Green Executive Director, The Patuxent Partnership and former College Trustee
- Ronald Hoffman Executive Director, Omohundro Institute of Early American History and Culture at the College of William and Mary
- Charles Holden Professor of History, St. Mary's College of Maryland Civil War expert
- The Honorable Steny Hoyer U.S. Representative from Maryland, House Majority Leader, and College Trustee
- Randolph K. Larsen Associate Professor of Chemistry, St. Mary's College of Maryland
- Steve McMahon Co-founder and Partner of Purple Strategies, LLC
- Zach Messitte President, Ripon College and former Director of the Center for the Study of Democracy
- Bruce Riedel Saban Center for Middle East Policy, Brookings Institution
- Terry Meyerhoff Rubenstein Former Executive Vice President of the Joseph Meyerhoff Family Charitable Funds and former Trustee of St. Mary's College of Maryland
- Sahar Shafqat Associate Professor of Political Science, St. Mary's College of Maryland
- Michael Steele Former Lieutenant Governor of Maryland
- Martin E. Sullivan Director, Smithsonian National Portrait Gallery; former Director of Historic St. Mary's City

== See also ==
- History of democracy
- Democratization
- Minority rights
- Women's suffrage
- Religious tolerance
- History of Maryland
- Province of Maryland (colonial Maryland)
- History of slavery in Maryland
- The American Civil War
- American Civil Rights Movement
- Democracy in the United States
- History of the Middle East
- History of South Africa
- Democracy in India
- Democracy in China
