= Jane Margaret O'Brien =

American chemist, academic administrator (b. 1953)

Jane Margaret O'Brien Maggie O'Brien

5th President of St. Mary's College of Maryland
- In office 1996–2009
- Preceded by: Edward T. Lewis

President of Hollins College
- In office 1991–1996

Personal details
- Born: 1953 (age 72–73)
- Education: Vassar College (BS), University of Delaware (PhD)
- Occupation: Professor of chemistry, college president, academic administrator

Jane Margaret O'Brien (born 1953), also known as Maggie O'Brien, is an American professor of chemistry, college president, and academic administrator. She is president emerita of St. Mary's College of Maryland, and was president of Hollins College (now Hollins University).

== Biography ==
O'Brien received her BS degree in biochemistry at Vassar College in 1975; and her PhD in chemistry at the University of Delaware in 1981.

O'Brien served as president of St. Mary's College of Maryland in St. Mary's City, Maryland, from 1996 to 2009. She was the president of Hollins College (now Hollins University) in Hollins, Virginia, from 1991 to 1996.

While she was president of St. Mary's College of Maryland in 1998, a group of students on a study abroad trip to Guatemala experienced being robbed and five female students were gang raped.
