= Matthew Schissler =

American business executive

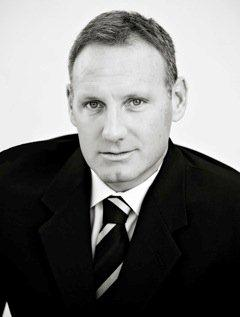
- Education: St. Mary's College of Maryland, 1993
- Occupations: Founder and Member, Multiple Private Funds and Work Your Core Investments, LLC. Board Member of Aztec Airways, Inc.
- Years active: 2001-Present
- Known for: Founder, Cord Blood America, Inc. (CBAI)

Matthew Schissler (born June 9, 1971) is an American business executive who has served in leadership roles in a number of privately and publicly held companies. He's most notable for having founded and managed Cord Blood America, Inc. (CBAI), a company specializing in the harvesting and storage of umbilical stem cells in the U.S. and worldwide. He currently manages a series of private investment funds, focused in a wide variety of companies exhibiting significant growth potential.

== Education ==
Schissler holds a degree in Biology and Public Policy from St. Mary's College of Maryland in 1993.

== Professional roles ==
=== Cord Blood America (CBAI) and Subsidiaries ===
In 2003, Schissler founded Cord Blood America, Inc. (CBAI), a company specializing in harvesting and storing stem cells in the U.S. and abroad, serving as the company's chairman of the board and CEO until 2012. Parents who subscribe to CBAI supply the company with a small amount of blood taken from the umbilical cord at the birth of a child, which the company stores in the event that the family may need it as the result of a medical condition that could benefit from a stem cell treatment. At the time, he also served as CEO and Chairman of the board for Cord Partners Inc., CBAI's original stem storage company, which was absorbed by CBAI in 2005.

In 2006, CBAI purchased the assets of the Cryobank for Oncologic and Reproductive Donors (CORD), a bank in Middletown, New York, with an inventory of 750 donors. In 2007, the company acquired Philadelphia-based CorCell Inc., at the time the fourth-largest umbilical cord blood bank in America. The same year, the company acquired CureSource, a Charleston-based cord blood storage facility that serviced about 340 customers. CorCell maintained its presence and name as CorCell Inc., a subsidiary of the parent company CBAI, being responsible for cord blood storage facilities. Schissler served as CorCell Inc.'s chairman, CEO and president. In 2010, they acquired 51 percent of stellacure GmbH of Hamburg, at the time the third-largest cord blood banking service in Germany, as well as a majority ownership of BioCells Argentina.

In 2010, Schissler relocated the company to Las Vegas, citing multiple reasons, including his frequent travels to Las Vegas for trade conventions, business-friendly tax climates and the ability to have low-cost laboratory space near the airport. Schissler also served as the founder and president of China Stem Cells, Inc., a stem cell storage facility in northeast China. In 2011, CBAI acquired two cord blood companies based in Chicago - Reproductive Genetics Institute, Inc, and NeoCells.

=== Private Investor ===
Schissler is a Founder and Managing Member of Multiple Private Investment funds. Investing since 2015, his funds are privately held "super value" funds focused on small to mid-cap companies, with an investment focus on companies exhibiting significant growth potential.

=== Work Your Core Investments, LLC ===
Schissler is a Founder and Managing Member of Work Your Core Investments (WYC), LLC. Founded in 2021, WYC is a privately held fund focused on purchasing or investing in franchises and other fitness related concepts, with an investment focus on unique performance concepts exhibiting significant growth potential.

=== Aztec Airways ===
In 2021, Schissler became a member of the Board of Directors for Aztec Airways of Fort Lauderdale, Florida. Aztec Airways was formed in 1998, and is certificated by the United States Federal Aviation Administration under FAR part 135 as an On-Demand/Commuter Scheduled US Air Carrier.

== Affiliations ==
Schissler has served on the board of advisors for the Las Vegas Science Festival and the board of directors for the Las Vegas Natural History Museum, and is a member of the Karma Foundation.

== Awards ==
In 2008, Schissler was a finalist for the Ernst and Young Entrepreneur of the Year Award.
