= Anthony Lake =

American diplomat and political advisor (born 1939)

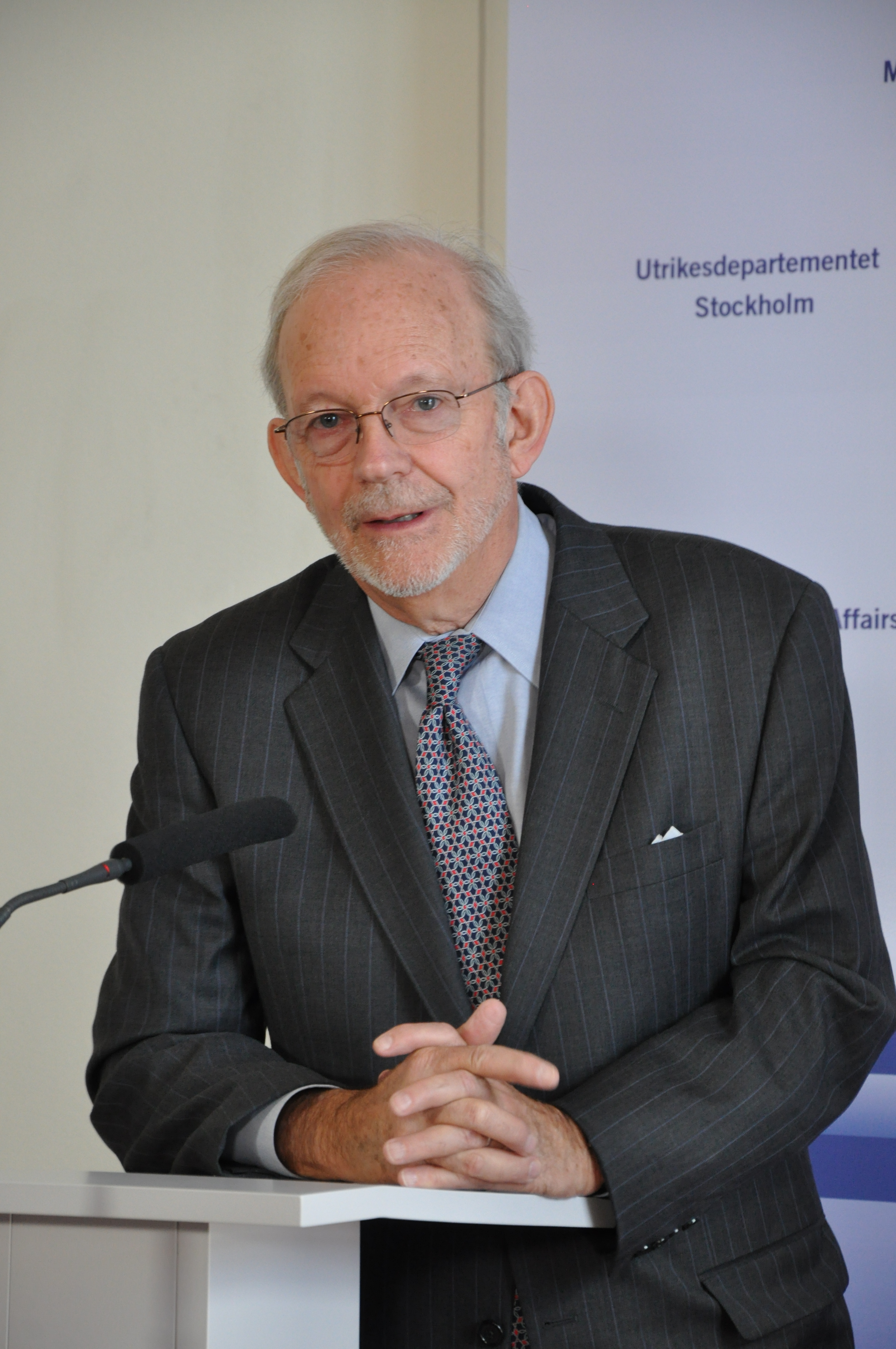
- Lake in 2010

6th Executive Director of UNICEF
- In office April 30, 2010 – December 31, 2017
- Secretary General: Ban Ki-moon; António Guterres
- Preceded by: Ann Veneman
- Succeeded by: Henrietta H. Fore

17th United States National Security Advisor
- In office January 20, 1993 – March 14, 1997
- President: Bill Clinton
- Deputy: Sandy Berger
- Preceded by: Brent Scowcroft
- Succeeded by: Sandy Berger

11th Director of Policy Planning
- In office January 21, 1977 – January 20, 1981
- President: Jimmy Carter
- Preceded by: Winston Lord
- Succeeded by: Paul Wolfowitz

Personal details
- Born: William Anthony Kirsopp Lake; April 2, 1939 (age 87) New York City, New York, U.S.
- Party: Democratic
- Spouses: Antonia Plehn (m. 1962; div. 1995); Julie Katzman (m. 2005)
- Children: 3
- Relatives: Kirsopp Lake (grandfather)
- Education: Harvard University (BA); Trinity College, Cambridge (attended); Princeton University (MA, PhD)

William Anthony Kirsopp Lake (born April 2, 1939) is an American diplomat and political advisor who served as the 17th United States National Security Advisor from 1993 to 1997 and as the sixth executive director of UNICEF from 2010 to 2017.

Lake has been a foreign policy advisor to many Democratic U.S. presidents and presidential candidates, and served as National Security Advisor under U.S. President Bill Clinton from 1993 to 1997. Lake is credited as being one of the individuals who developed the policy that led to the resolution of the Bosnian War. He also held the chair of Distinguished Professor in the Practice of Diplomacy at the Edmund A. Walsh School of Foreign Service at Georgetown University, in Washington, D.C.

== Early life ==
Lake is the grandson of Kirsopp Lake, a member of the Church of England clergy who moved to the United States from Oxford, England, in 1914, to teach New Testament studies at Harvard. Lake's father, Gerard Kirsopp Lake, was a New Deal Democrat, and his mother, Eleanor (née van Someren Hard), a Republican.

Lake himself was born in New York City. He attended Middlesex School and Harvard College, graduating with a Bachelor of Arts degree in 1961. Lake studied international economics at Trinity College, Cambridge for two years and later received a PhD from the Woodrow Wilson School of Public and International Affairs at Princeton University in 1974 after completing a doctoral dissertation titled "Caution and concern: the making of American policy toward South Africa, 1946-1971." In 2001, he co-edited a festschrift for Richard H. Ullman, his Princeton mentor.

Lake was good friends with Richard Holbrooke whom he met in Vietnam while both of them were in the foreign service. They frequently visited each other and Lake aided Holbrooke throughout the early years of his career. They grew apart when Holbrooke had an affair with Lake's wife. Although this did not initially end their companionship, they rarely spoke, and by the time Lake became National Security Advisor, their friendship was over.

== Career ==
Lake joined the State Department in 1962, serving until 1970 as a Foreign Service Officer. Lake was an assistant to Ambassador Henry Cabot Lodge Jr. during the Vietnam War. His State Department career included assignments as consul at the U.S. Embassy in Saigon, South Vietnam (1963), vice consul in Huế (1964–1965) and special assistant to the assistant to the president for national security affairs (1969–1970) in the Nixon administration. In 1969, he accompanied National Security Advisor Henry Kissinger on his first secret meeting with North Vietnamese negotiators in Paris. In 1970, he had a falling-out with Kissinger over the Nixon administration's Cambodian Campaign and left the State Department as a result. He later wrote a book critical of Kissinger's approach to Africa.

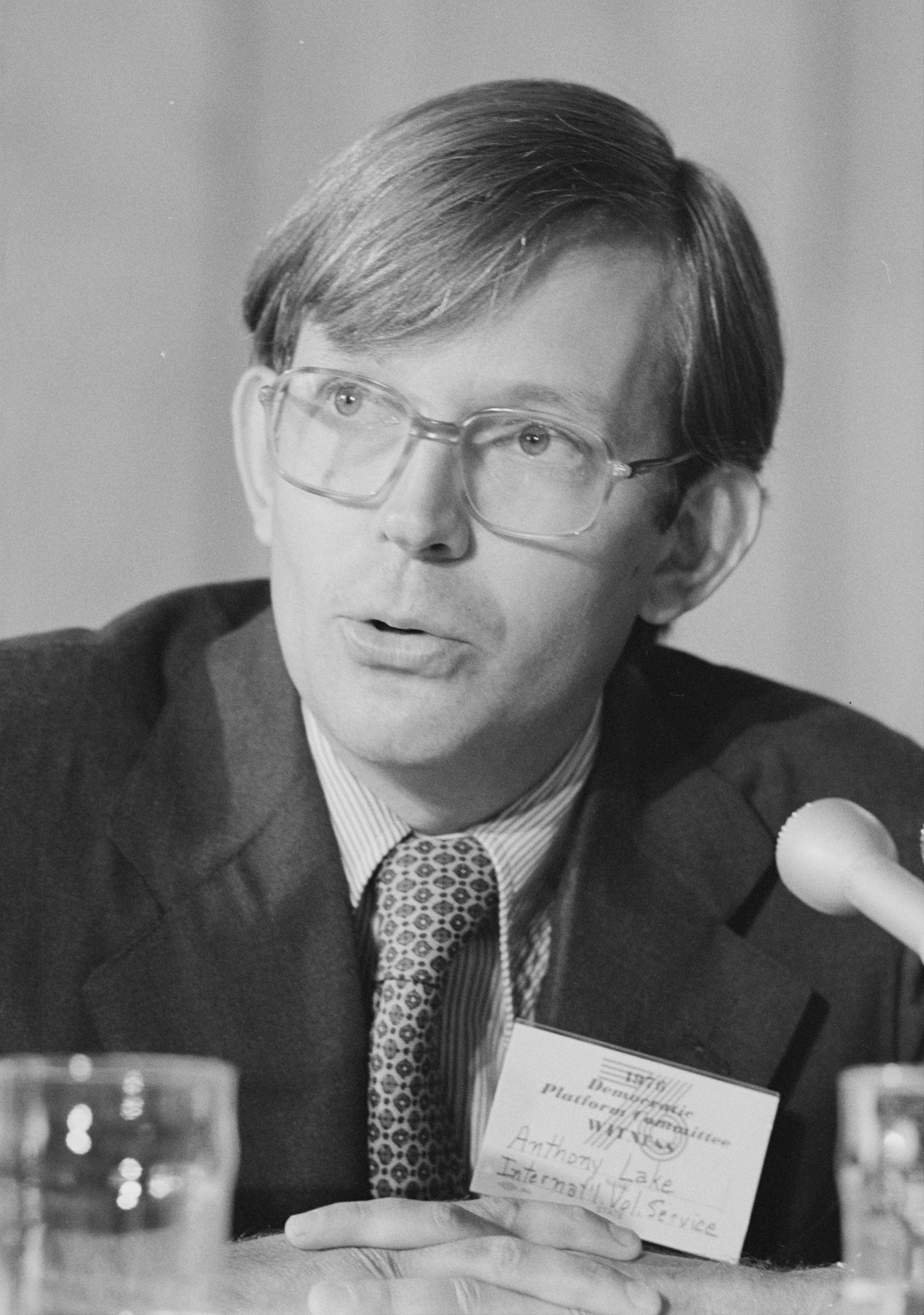
Anthony Lake at a meeting of the 1976 Democratic Platform Committee in Washington, D.C.

Lake worked for Democratic U.S. Senator Edmund Muskie of Maine in his 1972 presidential campaign. After Muskie lost the nomination to George McGovern, Lake served briefly at the Carnegie Endowment and International Voluntary Services before returning to serve as Director of Policy Planning under Jimmy Carter (1977–1981).

After Carter lost the 1980 election to Ronald Reagan, Lake became the Five College Professor of International Relations chair in Massachusetts (1981–1992), teaching first at Amherst College. In 1984, he moved to Mount Holyoke College, where he taught courses on the Vietnam War, Third World revolutions, and American foreign policy. (He left Mount Holyoke College in 1993 to become National Security Advisor from 1993 to 1997.) Among his protegees at Mount Holyoke was his student research assistant Mona Sutphen who would later serve in the Barack Obama White House as Deputy Chief of Staff for Policy. In 1997, he became Distinguished Professor in the Practice of Diplomacy at Georgetown University, until accepting his position with UNICEF.

During the 1992 presidential campaign, he was one of Clinton's chief foreign policy advisers. Lake later served as National Security Advisor (1993–1997). In the aftermath of the Cold War, Lake advocated a policy of "enlargement" of the number free market democracies. Told by the White House to sell his stocks in energy companies when he took the office in 1993, Lake did not do so. When Clinton decided in 1994 to allow Iran to arm the Bosnian army, Lake admitted he made a mistake when he didn't push to inform Congress of the decision.

=== Director of Central Intelligence nomination ===
Following Clinton's 1996 re-election, he nominated Lake to become the Director of Central Intelligence, It has been speculated that Lake's nomination "failed, in part, because Lake stated in a television interview that he was not sure if Alger Hiss was guilty."

After the withdrawal of his CIA nomination, Lake became White House Special Envoy (1998–2000). As special envoy, Lake mediated the drafting of the Algiers Agreement, ending the Eritrean-Ethiopian War. Lake co-founded Intellibridge Corporation in 2000 with David Rothkopf. In 2005, the assets of Intellibridge were acquired by the Eurasia Group.

Lake was a foreign policy adviser for Barack Obama's 2008 presidential campaign, having endorsed him over Senator Hillary Clinton, whom he had worked alongside during the Clinton administration. Lake was considered a potential Secretary of State until Senator Clinton was named to the position.

=== UNICEF ===
On March 16, 2010, Lake was named by United Nations Secretary General Ban Ki-moon as the next executive director of the United Nations Children's Fund (UNICEF), following his nomination by U.S. President Barack Obama.

On April 30, 2010, he officially entered the post, succeeding Ann Veneman, a former U.S. Secretary of Agriculture. On May 2, 2014, he was reappointed executive director of UNICEF by United Nations Secretary-General Ban Ki-moon and served through the end of 2017. At UNICEF, he was active at effort to refocus investment towards the most disadvantaged children, and reducing child mortality.

== Other activities ==
Lake was an advisory board member for the Partnership for a Secure America, a not-for-profit organization dedicated to recreating the bipartisan center in American national security and foreign policy. He has also served as chair on the boards of the United States Fund for UNICEF and the Marshall Legacy Institute. He also is serving a term from 2005 to 2010 on the Mount Holyoke College Board of Trustees.

For many years Lake served on the board of trustees for St. Mary's College of Maryland. He played key roles in the establishment of the Center for the Study of Democracy at the college, where he also served on the advisory board.

== Religion ==
Lake was raised in the Congregational Church, but recounts that he "embarked on his spiritual journey as a young man," first converting to the Episcopal Church. However, since then he had "long been drawn to Judaism," and "began to feel strongly that I wanted to be part of that community." He ultimately converted to Judaism in 2005, before marrying Julie T. Katzman, currently the Executive Vice President and Chief Operating Officer of the Inter-American Development Bank. He credits Katzman's religious faith as the impetus responsible for his decision to investigate his attraction to Judaism more fully, and began studying with former Navy Chaplain Rabbi Arnold Resnicoff (who was serving with him on the Board of Trustees of the Carnegie Council for Ethics in International Affairs) for a full year before his conversion. Later, Resnicoff officiated at his marriage to Katzman.

However, Lake jokes that he was Jewish in the eyes of others well before his formal conversion. First, in 1997, when news broke that Secretary of State Madeleine Albright had discovered that she had Jewish ancestors, and a story about other Jews in the Administration mistakenly reported that Clinton's "entire national security team was Jewish." Based on that news story, Lake recounts, his name was added to the list used by the White House Liaison to the Jewish community, and Lake began to receive invitations to special events, such as the White House Hanukkah Party—and he says he was delighted to accept those invitations. The second time was two years later, when a 1999 Washington Post story described a new release of Watergate tapes of conversations between President Richard Nixon and H.R. Haldeman, his Chief of Staff. Those tapes included a conversation where Nixon asks if Lake is Jewish, and Haldeman responds, "Well, I'm not so sure, but he looks Jewish." Based on these tapes, Lake has said that, "Now I can trace my [Jewish] heritage all the way back to Nixon!"

== Personal life ==
Lake was married to Antonia Plehn (1939 - 2025) from 1962 to 1995; they had three children.

In 2000, Lake began a relationship with investment banker Julie Katzman. They married in 2005, and Lake converted to Judaism the same year.

Lake had been good friends with diplomat Richard Holbrooke whom he met in Vietnam in the early 1960s while both of them were in the foreign service. They frequently visited each other and Lake aided Holbrooke throughout the early years of his career. They grew apart when Holbrooke had an affair with Lake's wife, eventually rarely speaking, and by the time Lake became Bill Clinton's National Security Advisor, their friendship was over.

== Books authored ==
- More Than Humanitarianism : A Strategic U.S. Approach Toward Africa (2006, co-author with Christine Todd Whitman)
- 6 Nightmares: The Real Threats to American Security (2001)
- The Real and the Ideal: Essays on International Relations in Honor of Richard Ullman (2001, co-edited)
- After the Wars: Reconstruction in Afghanistan, Central America, Indochina, the Horn of Africa, and Southern Africa (1990, editor)
- Somoza Falling: A Case Study of Washington at Work (1989)
- Third World Radical Regimes: U.S. Policy Under Carter and Reagan (1985)
- Our Own Worst Enemy: The Unmaking of American Foreign Policy (1984, co-author)
- The "Tar Baby" Option: American Policy Toward Southern Rhodesia (1976).
- Legacy of Vietnam: The War, American Society, and the Future of U.S. Foreign Policy (1976, contributing editor)

== Honours ==
- Grand Cordon of the Order of the Rising Sun (2018)

== See also ==
- Unsuccessful nominations to the Cabinet of the United States

Political offices
Preceded by Brent Scowcroft	United States National Security Advisor; 1993–1997	Succeeded by Sandy Berger
Diplomatic posts
Preceded by Ann Veneman	Executive Director of UNICEF; 2010–2017	Succeeded by Henrietta H. Fore
