= Mary Adele France =

American university president

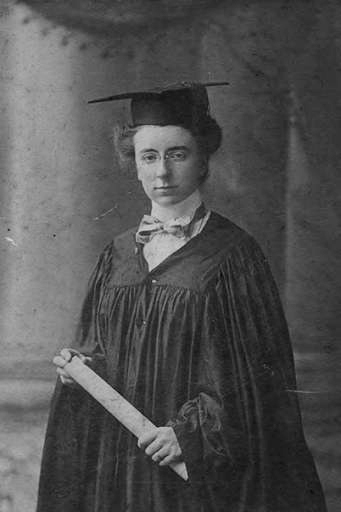
- Mary Adele France, 1905
- Born: February 17, 1880; Chestertown, Maryland
- Died: September 16, 1954 (aged 74); Catonsville, Maryland
- Other name: M. Adele France
- Education: Washington College
- Occupation: Educator

Mary Adele France, also known as M. Adele France (February 17, 1880 in Chestertown, Maryland – September 16, 1954 in Catonsville, Maryland), was the first president of St. Mary's Female Seminary Junior College, which is now a coeducational, four-year public honors college, known as St. Mary's College of Maryland. She is credited with expanding St. Mary's Female Seminary into a junior college. She was both the last principal of the seminary and the first president of the college.

She was also the supervisor of the Kent County, Maryland Elementary Schools, and supervisor of the Shelby, Tennessee school system. She was also a math and science teacher.

== Early life ==
France graduated from Washington College in Maryland in 1905. She was the fifth female graduate of the institution.

== Career ==
=== Teaching ===
France was a math and science teacher. She first taught at St. Mary's Female Seminary in the 1900s and 1910s, then she taught at a few other schools in Maryland.

=== Superintendent of schools ===
In 1918 she became the superintendent of elementary schools in Kent County, Maryland followed by a position as superintendent of schools in Shelby County, Tennessee in 1921.

=== Return to St. Mary's Female Seminary as Principal ===
France later returned to St. Mary's Female Seminary and became its principal.

=== Role in expanding school to a junior college, appointment as president ===
While in this role, she developed the idea of expanding the school into a junior college. After lobbying the Maryland state legislature for some time, she was successful and the school was expanded into a junior college in 1926 and renamed "St. Mary's Female Seminary Junior College".

Adelle based her rationale for expanding the school into a college on women recently gaining the right to vote.

=== 1942: Conferral of Honorary Degree from Washington College ===
Mary Adele France received an honorary degree in 1942 from Washington College "for her significant contributions to the education of young women." Eleanor Roosevelt also received an honorary degree at the graduation ceremony.

== Death ==
Mary Adelle France died in 1954.

== Legacy ==
The college that France helped to establish is now coeducational and a four-year public honors college, known as St. Mary's College of Maryland.
