= J. Frank Raley Jr. =

American politician

Member of the Maryland Senate from the St. Mary's County district
- In office 1963–1966

Member of the Maryland House of Delegates from the St. Mary's County district
- In office 1955–1959

Personal details
- Born: John Frank Raley, Jr. September 13, 1926 Park Hall Estates, Maryland
- Died: August 21, 2012 (aged 85) St. Mary's City, Maryland
- Party: Democratic
- Education: Georgetown University

Military service
- Branch/service: United States Army
- Years of service: 1945–1946

John Frank Raley Jr. (September 13, 1926 – August 21, 2012) was a Maryland politician and an advocate for education, economic development and protection and restoration of the Chesapeake Bay.

He was a Democrat, a State Senator, and a member of the Maryland House of Delegates and is widely credited for modernizing St. Mary's County's badly outdated infrastructure (schools, roads, bridges, telecommunications and electric services), thus paving the way for a forty-year period of economic growth and development.

He is also credited with getting the Maryland State Legislature to establish St. Mary's College of Maryland as a four-year liberal arts college and served on its board of trustees for years, guiding and advocating for the school's further development.

He has been called, by area historians and newspapers, a founder of modern St. Mary's County.

== Early life ==
He was born in St. Mary's County, Maryland and grew up in a family of politicians to include his father, grandfather, and great-grandfather. He grew up during the Great Depression, and learned about politics through his family at a young age.

Raley attended parochial schools in St. Mary's County, as well as the Charlotte Hall Military Academy for high school and received his B.A. from Georgetown University. He also served in the United States Army during World War Two. He also was a general insurance agent.

== Career ==
=== 1962: Raley challenges the County Political Machine ===
In 1962 Raley organized a slate of candidates who ran with him to replace the County political machine that had presided over economic stagnation for decades. He was elected, and followed this with a large scale and ultimately successful campaign that he led while he was both in and out of office to bring modern development and improvements in education to the St. Mary's County.

=== Role in economic development, modernization of St. Mary's County ===
==== Background ====
St. Mary's County had long struggled with rural poverty, a legacy of the plantation system that had previously dominated the county through to the 1800s. The plantation system had left a legacy of huge disparities in education and income in the county. It had long depressed the development of the local labor market and had created a widespread pattern of concentrated landholdings, leaving most non-landowning county residents (both Black and White) poor and uneducated.

Consequently, long-term cycles of poverty persisted among the non-landed peoples of the county. This pattern continued into the 20th century, leaving the county's wealth concentrated in very few hands.

==== Raley's dream of eliminating rural poverty in St. Mary's County ====
Raley, while still in college at Georgetown University, determined that he wanted to do something to change the economic patterns in the county. He was known for persisting with this vision throughout his entire career of political and then civic involvement. In the late 1950s he ran for office in the Maryland House of delegates. He served there for a time before making a successful run for the Maryland State Senate. It was in the senate where his influence became sufficient to begin to leverage funding for modernization projects and also political reform for the county, moving a large number of community capitol improvements into action.

==== State Senate ====
He was very successful in the Senate a relatively short period of time, proving himself adept at politics and leveraging the state legislature to provide many key state projects to economically develop St. Mary's County and to also add new schools.

As a State Senator, Raley was largely credited with providing most of the new infrastructure that was required to economically develop St. Mary's County. According to Raley, over 100 pieces of legislation were needed to bring the schools, roads, and bridges, including the Governor Thomas Johnson Memorial Bridge to the county. Raley chaired the Public Buildings Committee the entire time he served in the Maryland Senate. From this position he was able to launch the largest economic infrastructure development and modernization program in St. Mary's County's history. He is credited with playing pivotal roles in transforming the county, clearing the way significantly for the last 40 years of economic development in the county.

==== Defeat ====
Raley's elective office career was cut short when a successful smear campaign falsely accused him of attempting to directly eliminate the very popular slot machines (gambling) that were all over the county at the time. In fact he had supported a measure to forward a referendum on the issue that would have put the decision in the hands of voters in St. Mary's County.

He had not taken any direct action against the machines in the State Senate himself, although he did say years later that he never liked the slot machines, or how they affected county life. However, his political opponents were successful in convincing the majority of the county residents at the time that he was actively working to eliminate the machines in the county. The slot machine issue generated a great deal of anger at Raley at the time, and he never again ran for office.

Raley remained very active in county and state politics nevertheless, sitting on many development boards and using his own influence and family connections to lobby the state legislature on the county's behalf. He continued working in this capacity for the rest of his life.

==== After the Senate ====
Instead of retiring from politics Raley became extremely active in numerous local and regional economic development boards and commissions, as well as running his own local retail business. He also worked tirelessly for decades to get the state to expand and further develop St. Mary's College of Maryland.

He also became very involved in promoting environmental and policy advancements for the restoration and protection of the Chesapeake Bay for which he was later recognized by the state of Maryland. He continued these efforts for the rest of his life.

=== Key post-legislative positions held ===
- Maryland Economic Development Commission
- President of the Lexington Park, Maryland Chamber of Commerce
- Chairman of the St. Mary's College of Maryland Board of Trustees from 1966 to 1991
- Member, Planning and Zoning Commission, 1967–78
- Member-at-large, Tri-County Council for Southern Maryland, 1967–88 (also its co-founder)
- Member, Chesapeake Bay Critical Area Commission, 1985–90.
- Southern Maryland Navy Alliance (also its first president)
- Patuxent Partnership
- St. Mary's City Commission

After losing re-election to the Maryland Senate, Raley also became a delegate to the 1967 Constitutional Convention of Maryland.

== Expansion of Patuxent River Naval Air Station ==
Raley played key roles in getting the base expanded at a time when it was facing possible closure. He also was instrumental in helping to prevent several other possible closure attempts, and helped put the base on a strong footing for long-term survival.

== Raley's efforts to expand education in the county ==
=== Education expansion as anti-poverty measure ===
As a part of his effort to eliminate rural poverty in St. Mary's County, J. Frank Raley is credited with significantly expanding primary, secondary and post secondary education by securing numerous capital programs for education in the Maryland Legislature.

Raley then followed this with years of ongoing, relentless education-related advocacy on behalf of the county.

=== Transformation of St. Mary's College ===
Raley was also instrumental in expanding the then two-year St. Mary's Seminary Junior College into the four-year St. Mary's College of Maryland. Under Raley's decades long board leadership the school then rose to national prominence, now ranked as the 5th best public college in the United States by U.S. News & World Report.

I consider education as the most important of all public problems. For sound progress in any community, [the community] must first develop to the fullest extent, the minds of its children.

- J. Frank Raley, Jr., 26 April 1962

Under Raley's decades long board leadership, the school rose steadily to national prominence, becoming one of the top ranked public colleges in the United States.

=== Board of trustees service ===
Raley also played many key roles in the further development of St. Mary's College and its eventual rise to national prominence. Raley served on the board of trustees for the college from 1967 to 1991 and counseled every president of the college from then until his death in 2012.

=== Center for the Study of Democracy ===
Raley had a great interest in democracy and education and was also instrumental in establishing the Center for the Study of Democracy at St. Mary's College.

=== Honors ===
- The Maryland Senate declared Raley one of Maryland's First Citizens" in 2006. One of the most prestigious awards that a citizen of Maryland can achieve.
- For his dedication to St. Mary's College, Raley was awarded the schools highest honor, the Order of the Ark and Dove. In addition to the award, the college dining hall in the campus center was officially named the "Raley Great Room". An oil portrait of him hangs on the wall of the great room to honor and remember him.

== Acquisition of land for Point Lookout State Park ==
Raley was also instrumental in getting the state to acquire the land for Point Lookout State Park, now a nationally recognized historic and recreation area.
