= Thomas Penfield Jackson =

American federal judge (1937–2013)

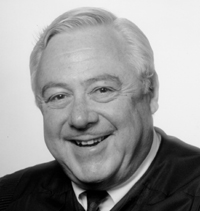

Senior Judge of the United States District Court for the District of Columbia
- In office January 31, 2002 – August 31, 2004

Judge of the United States District Court for the District of Columbia
- In office June 25, 1982 – January 31, 2002
- Appointed by: Ronald Reagan
- Preceded by: Oliver Gasch
- Succeeded by: Rosemary M. Collyer

Personal details
- Born: January 10, 1937 Washington, D.C., U.S.
- Died: June 15, 2013 (aged 76) Compton, Maryland, U.S.
- Education: Dartmouth College (A.B.); Harvard University (LL.B.)

Thomas Penfield Jackson (January 10, 1937 – June 15, 2013) was an American jurist who served as a U.S. district judge of the United States District Court for the District of Columbia from 1982 to 2004.

== Education and career ==
Born in Washington, D.C., Jackson graduated from Dartmouth College with an Artium Baccalaureus degree in the class of 1958, and from Harvard Law School with a Bachelor of Laws in 1964. He served in the United States Navy from 1958 to 1961. He was in private practice in Washington, D.C. from 1964 to 1982. He served as President of the District of Columbia Bar Association.

== Federal judicial service ==
Jackson was nominated by President Ronald Reagan on May 24, 1982, to a seat on the United States District Court for the District of Columbia vacated by Judge Oliver Gasch. He was confirmed by the United States Senate on June 24, 1982, and received commission on June 25, 1982. He assumed senior status on January 31, 2002. His service terminated on August 31, 2004, due to retirement.

=== Terry A. Anderson case ===
in 2000, as presiding judge, he ruled in favor of Terry A. Anderson and awarded Anderson $324 million from frozen Iranian assets due to Anderson's captivity in Lebanon under Shia Hezbollah militants of the Islamic Jihad Organization who are designated by the United States State Department as Iranian government supported terrorists. The basis of Anderson's case was from a 1996 anti-terrorism law which allowed United States citizens, who are victims of terrorism abroad, to sue foreign governments for damages.

=== Microsoft case ===
Jackson is perhaps best known to the public as the presiding judge in the 2001 antitrust United States v. Microsoft case. Jackson was the first in a series of judges worldwide to determine that Microsoft abused its market position and monopoly power in ways that were highly detrimental to innovation in the industry and consumers of the products. The summary paragraph in his findings of fact is quoted below.

Most harmful of all is the message that Microsoft's actions have conveyed to every enterprise with the potential to innovate in the computer industry. Through its conduct toward Netscape, IBM, Compaq, Intel, and others, Microsoft has demonstrated that it will use its prodigious market power and immense profits to harm any firm that insists on pursuing initiatives that could intensify competition against one of Microsoft's core products. Microsoft's past success in hurting such companies and stifling innovation deters investment in technologies and businesses that exhibit the potential to threaten Microsoft. The ultimate result is that some innovations that would truly benefit consumers never occur for the sole reason that they do not coincide with Microsoft's self-interest.

Microsoft attempted to show that Jackson's conduct during the case demonstrated that he unfairly favored the prosecution, but they failed to do so in court proceedings. He did speak to a reporter off the record after the evidence in the case had been heard but prior to issuing his conclusions of law, and this was contrary to judicial rules. Speaking with that reporter he expressed unfavorable opinions and statements about Microsoft and its employees which he had developed as a result of hearing the evidence and witnesses in the trial. Speaking about Microsoft executives, he compared them to "stubborn mules who should be walloped with a two-by-four" and "gangland killers", referring to a murder case he presided over four years earlier:

On the day of the sentencing, the gang members maintained that they had done nothing wrong, saying that the whole case was a conspiracy by the white power structure to destroy them. I am now under no illusions that miscreants will realize that other parts of society view them that way."

The judge also characterized Microsoft leader and co-founder Bill Gates as a Napoleon, "unethical", as well as comparing him to a "drug trafficker" repeatedly caught as a result of telephone wiretaps. However, it was private meetings with journalists released after the verdict but during the appeal that caused the appeal to be granted.

Jackson's order that Microsoft be divided into two companies, one owning the Windows operating system and the other owning Microsoft's various application software products, including the Internet Explorer web browser, was reversed on appeal. Eight of his factual findings about Microsoft's monopolistic practices against the Sherman Antitrust Act were upheld. During the appellate hearing, Harry Edwards, chief judge of the U.S. Court of Appeals for the District of Columbia, stated that judges have no right to "go run off our mouths" about cases they hear. "The system would be a sham if all judges went around doing this."

Jackson, in spite of the findings of the appellate court, continued to deny that any such bias existed and insisted that any perception of bias in the minds of observers was created by Microsoft. His statements were a response to several evasive tactics Microsoft used at the trial, including falsifying video evidence, non-responsiveness on the stand, and denying allegations contained in evidence.

When an unrelated case involving Microsoft and charges of discrimination was assigned to him in 2001, Jackson recused himself from the case. The recusal has been called into question by some commentators, as other cases have warranted a "slap on the wrist" of the judiciary, such as the Marion Barry trial in 1990 where Jackson said, "that he had never seen a stronger government case and was upset that some jurors would not vote to convict." The appeals court upheld the verdict, but commented that "It is worth noting that the district court judge could have recused himself in this case. The recusal option was a compelling one."

== Post judicial service ==
Until his death, Jackson was a partner at the law firm of Jackson and Campbell, P.C.

For many years after his retirement from the court, Jackson served on the Board of Trustees for St. Mary's College of Maryland. He was very active on the board and also played key roles in the establishment of the Center for the Study of Democracy at the college, where he also served on the advisory board. Jackson was often on the campus, working with professors and delivering class and seminar lectures free of charge and also mentoring students.

In 2014, St. Mary's College of Maryland established the Thomas Penfield Jackson Award for Civic Responsibility and Democratic Citizenship in his honor. The award will be given yearly to students demonstrating exceptional citizenship and scholarship.

Jackson died of cancer at his home in Compton, Maryland on June 15, 2013.

== Sources ==
Legal offices
Preceded by Oliver Gasch	Judge of the United States District Court for the District of Columbia; 1982–2002	Succeeded by Rosemary M. Collyer
