= Famous Dog Lassie =

Japanese anime television series

- Title card
- 名犬ラッシー
- Based on: Lassie Come Home by Eric Knight
- Screenplay by: Aya Matsui; Hideki Mitsui
- Directed by: Sunao Katabuchi
- Music by: Masanori Sasaji
- Country of origin: Japan
- Original language: Japanese
- No. of episodes: 26

Production
- Executive producer: Koichi Motohashi
- Producers: Senya Suzuki (Fuji TV); Akio Yogo
- Production companies: Fuji Television; Nippon Animation

Original release
- Network: FNS (Fuji TV)
- Release: January 14 – August 18, 1996

Famous Dog Lassie (名犬ラッシー, Meiken Rasshī) is a 1996 Japanese anime television series animated by Nippon Animation as the 22nd entry of the World Masterpiece Theater staple. The anime is based on the 1940 novel Lassie Come-Home by Eric Knight and also the second animated Lassie series ever produced, since Lassie's Rescue Rangers.
