= Donald Curtis =

American actor (1915–1997)

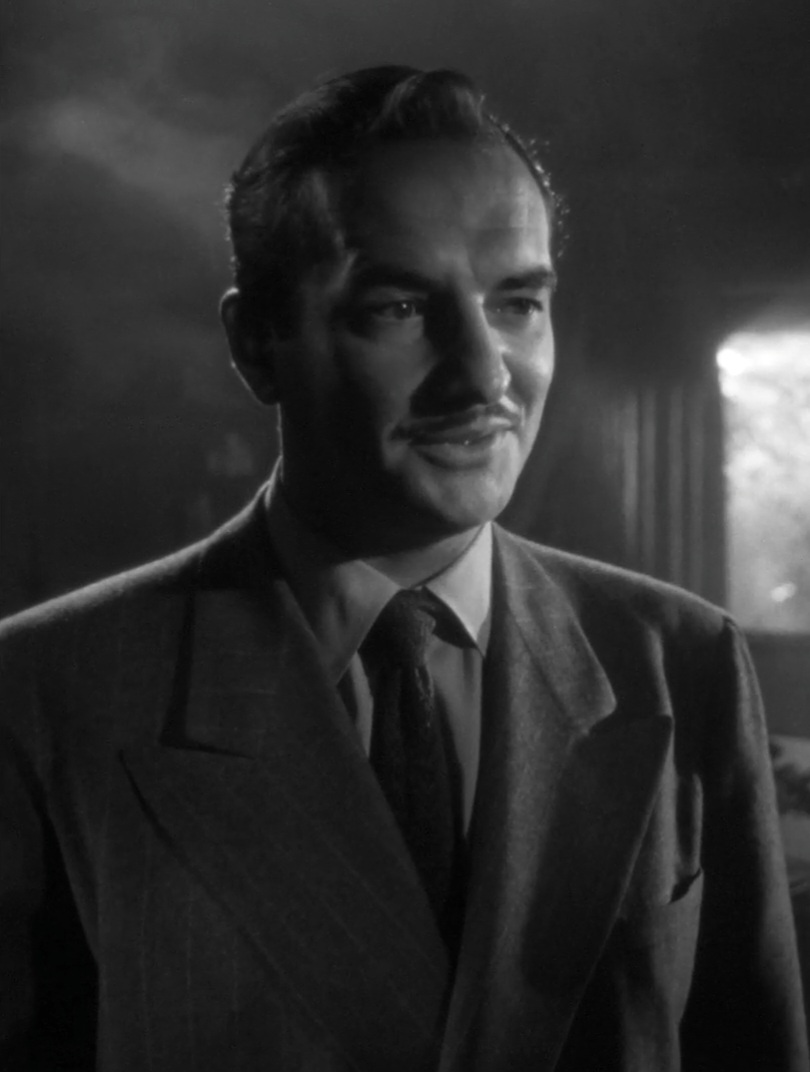
- Curtis in The Amazing Mr. X (1948)
- Born: Curtis D. Rudolf; February 27, 1915; Spokane, Washington, U.S.
- Died: May 22, 1997 (aged 82); Desert Hot Springs, California, U.S.
- Occupation: Actor
- Years active: 1940–1967
- Spouse: Margaret Jennings (m. 1940)

Donald Curtis (born Curtis D. Rudolf; February 27, 1915 – May 22, 1997) was an American actor who had roles in dozens of films and television series.

== Biography ==
Curtis was born in Spokane, Washington, the son of Mr. and Mrs. Carl W. Rudolph. Before he began acting in films, he taught at Northwestern University, Allegheny College, and Duquesne University.

Curtis's early acting experience included work at the Pasadena Community Playhouse. He also was in two Broadway plays, Caribbean Carnival (1947) and Anybody Home (1949). In the summer of 1950, Curtis portrayed Adam Conway in the comedy Detective's Wife on CBS television.

Curtis resumed using his birth name when he became a religious leader. As Curtis D. Rudolf, he ministered in the First Church of Religious Science in New York City before he became leader-director of the Church of Religious Science in Philadelphia. He also was pastor of the Church of Religious Science in Santa Barbara, California and the First Church of Religious Science in Dallas, Texas.

Curtis married Margaret Jennings in 1940.

On May 22, 1997, Curtis died in Desert Hot Springs, California.

== Filmography ==
Year	Title	Role	Notes
1940	Emergency Squad	Ambulance Intern	Uncredited
1940	Flash Gordon Conquers the Universe	Ronal	Serial, [Chs. 1-12], Uncredited
1940	Tear Gas Squad	Second Cadet	Uncredited
1940	Murder in the Air	Quartermaster	Uncredited
1940	Junior G-Men	Henchman Akin	Serial, Uncredited
1940	Knute Rockne All American	West Point Football Player	Uncredited
1940	North West Mounted Police	Mountie Secretary	Uncredited
1940	Take Me Back to Oklahoma	Henchman Snapper	
1940	The Son of Monte Cristo	Guard	Uncredited
1940	Texas Rangers Ride Again	Ranger Stafford	Uncredited
1941	Secret Evidence	Detective Murphy	
1941	City of Missing Girls	Reporter	Uncredited
1941	Hands Across the Rockies	Dade Crawley	
1941	Criminals Within	Lt. John Harmon	
1941	The Son of Davy Crockett	Jack Ringe - Henchman	
1941	Thunder Over the Prairie	Henchman Taylor	
1941	We Go Fast	The Real Nabob of Borria	Uncredited
1941	The Royal Mounted Patrol	Frenchy Duvalle	
1941	Today I Hang	Ticket Agent	Uncredited
1942	Code of the Outlaw	Taggart - Henchman	
1942	Hello, Annapolis	Chief Petty Officer	Uncredited
1942	Westward Ho	Rick West	
1942	In Old California	Pike - Dawson's Henchman	Uncredited
1942	Tombstone, the Town Too Tough to Die	Phineas Clanton	
1942	Friendly Enemies	Soldier	Uncredited
1942	Joan of Ozark	Leonard Jones	
1942	Invisible Agent	German Sentry	Uncredited
1942	War Dogs	Fred	
1942	A Tornado in the Saddle	Steve Duncan - aka Slim Stevens	
1943	Law of the Northwest	Frank Mason	
1943	Bataan	Lieutenant	
1943	Salute to the Marines	Randall James	
1943	Swing Shift Maisie	Joe Peterson	
1943	Swing Fever	Reporter	Uncredited
1943	The Cross of Lorraine	Marcel	
1943	Lost Angel	Mounted Policeman	Uncredited
1944	See Here, Private Hargrove	Sgt. Heldon	
1944	Thirty Seconds Over Tokyo	Lieut. Randall	
1944	Meet Me in St. Louis	Dr. Girard	Uncredited
1944	National Velvet	American	Uncredited
1945	This Man's Navy	Operations Officer	
1945	Without Love	Prof. Ellis	Uncredited
1945	Son of Lassie	Sergeant Eddie Brown	
1945	Thrill of a Romance	K.O. Karny	
1945	Spellbound	Harry	
1945	They Were Expendable	Lt. (J.G.) 'Shorty' Long / Radio Announcer	
1946	A Letter for Evie	Capt. Budlowe	
1946	Bad Bascomb	John Fulton	
1946	Courage of Lassie	Charlie	
1946	White Tie and Tails	Nate Romero	
1946	Gallant Bess	Lt. Bridgeman	
1947	Night Song	George	
1947	Dangerous Years	Jeff Carter	
1948	I Love Trouble	Martin	
1948	The Fuller Brush Man	Gregory Cruckston	
1948	The Amazing Mr. X	Paul Faber	
1949	Stampede	Stanton	
1950	Two Flags West		Uncredited
1954	The Shanghai Story	Leader	Uncredited
1954	Phffft	Rick Vidal	
1955	It Came from Beneath the Sea	Dr. John Carter	
1955	All That Heaven Allows	Howard Hoffer	
1956	Flame of the Islands	Johnny	
1956	Earth vs. the Flying Saucers	Maj. Huglin	
1956	The Ten Commandments	Mered	
1956	7th Cavalry	Lt. Bob Fitch	
1957	Night Passage	Jubilee	
1967	Warning Shot	Dr. James B. Ruston	Uncredited
