= Lassie =

Fictional female collie dog

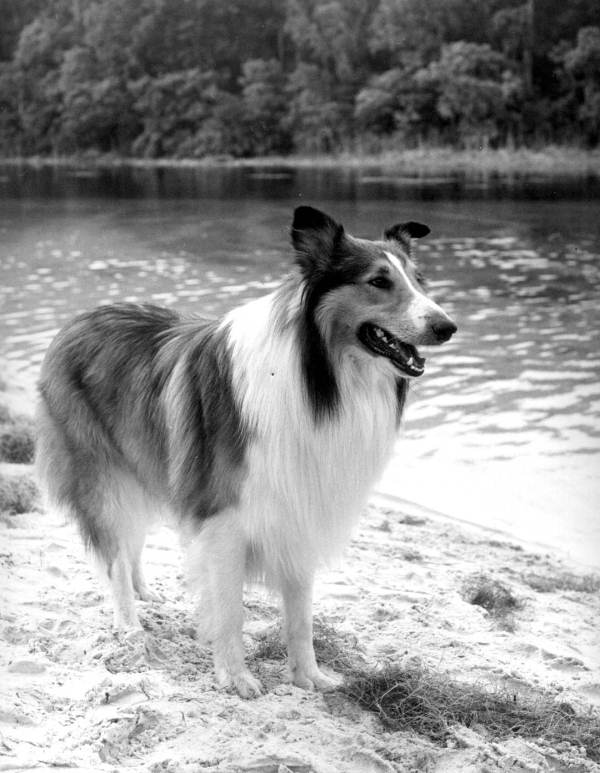
- Lassie television series filming on location in Florida (1965)
- First appearance: Lassie Come-Home
- Created by: Eric Knight
- Portrayed by: Pal

In-universe information
- Species: Dog (Rough Collie)
- Gender: Female

Lassie is a fictional female Rough Collie dog and is featured in a 1938 short story by Eric Knight that was later expanded to a 1940 full-length novel, Lassie Come-Home. Knight's portrayal of Lassie bears some features in common with another fictional female collie of the same name, featured in the British writer Elizabeth Gaskell's 1859 short story "The Half Brothers". In "The Half Brothers", Lassie is loved only by her young master and guides the adults back to where two boys are lost in a snowstorm.

Knight's novel was filmed by Metro-Goldwyn-Mayer in 1943 as Lassie Come Home, with a dog named Pal playing Lassie. Pal then appeared with the stage name "Lassie" in six other MGM feature films through 1951. Pal's owner and trainer, Rudd Weatherwax, then acquired the Lassie name and trademark from MGM and appeared with Pal (as "Lassie") at rodeos, fairs, and similar events across America in the early 1950s. In 1954, the television series Lassie debuted and, over the next 19 years, a succession of Pal's descendants appeared on the series. The "Lassie" character has appeared in radio, television, film, toys, comic books, animated series, juvenile novels, and other media. Pal's descendants continue to play Lassie today.

== History ==
=== Eric Knight short story and novel ===
The fictional character of Lassie was created by English author Eric Knight in Lassie Come-Home, first published as a short story in the Dec. 17, 1938 issue of The Saturday Evening Post and later as a full-length novel in 1940. Set in the Depression-era England, the novel depicts the lengthy journey a Rough Collie makes to be reunited with her young Yorkshire master after her family is forced to sell her for money.

=== Movies and television ===
In 1943, the novel was adapted into a feature film, Lassie Come Home, by Metro-Goldwyn-Mayer (MGM) that stars Roddy McDowall and Elizabeth Taylor. The movie was a hit and enjoyed favorable critical response. MGM followed this with several additional films, including a sequel entitled Son of Lassie (1945), starring Peter Lawford and June Lockhart, and Courage of Lassie (1946) with Elizabeth Taylor again. A radio series, Lassie Radio Show, was also created, airing until 1949.

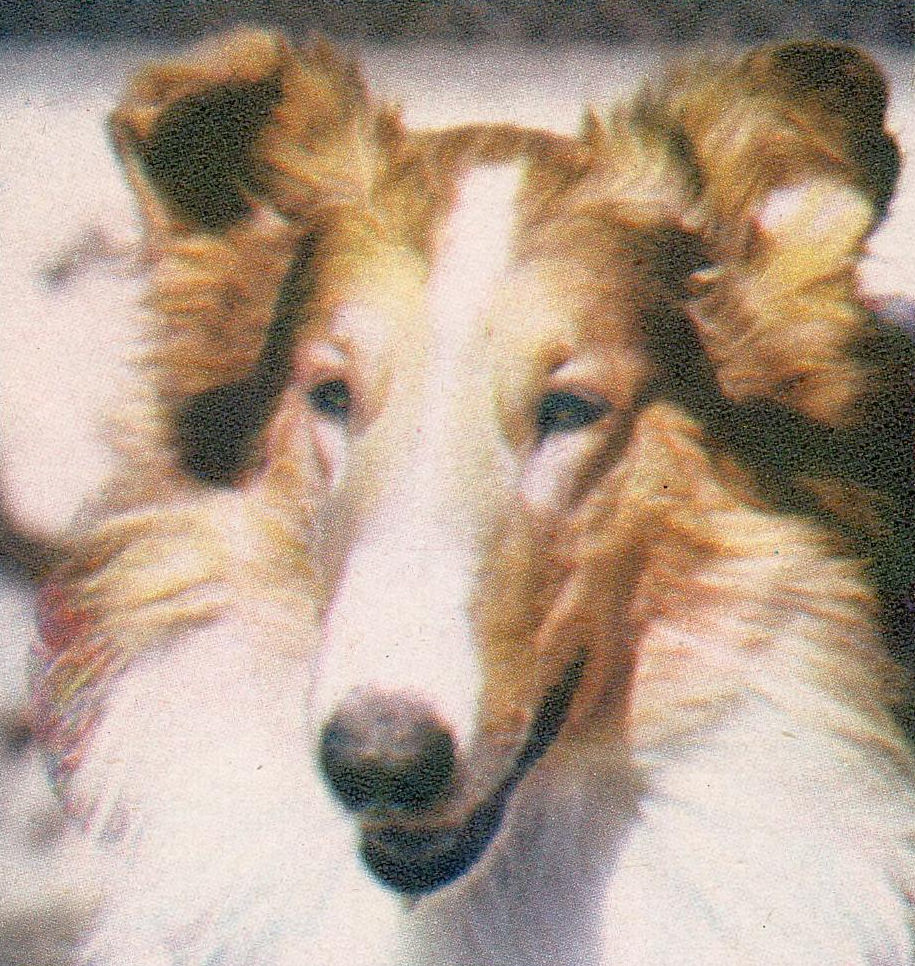
Lassie c. 1954

From 1954 to 1973, the television series Lassie was broadcast, with Lassie initially residing on a farm with a young male master. In the eleventh season, it changed to U.S. Forest Service rangers as her companions, then the collie was on her own for a season, before ending the series with Lassie residing at a ranch for orphaned children. The series was the recipient of two Emmy Awards before it was canceled in 1973. Lassie won several PATSY Awards (an award for animal actors). A second series followed in the 1980s. In 1997, Canadian production company Cinar Inc. produced a new Lassie television series for the Animal Planet network in the U.S. and YTV in Canada. It ran until 1999.

In 2005, a remake of the original Lassie Come Home movie was produced in the United Kingdom. Starring Peter O'Toole and Samantha Morton, Lassie was released in 2006.

Additionally, three animated TV series featuring the canine were produced. The first was Lassie's Rescue Rangers, created by Filmation Associates, which aired on ABC from 1973 to 1975. An anime series Famous Dog Lassie aired in the 1996. In 2014, a new animated series titled The New Adventures of Lassie was co-produced by Superprod Animation and Classic Media, in which Lassie was owned by the Parker family and lived in a national park. The series was primarily a traditionally animated (2D hand-drawn) TV series, though it also used some CGI animation. It was first seen in the United States starting in 2020 via the CBS All Access streaming service, then carried over to successor service Paramount+.

Lassie continues to make personal and TV show appearances as well as marketing a line of pet food and a reality pet care TV show, Lassie's Pet Vet on PBS stations in the United States. Lassie is one of only three animals (and one of very few fictional characters, such as Mickey Mouse, Kermit the Frog, and Bugs Bunny) to be awarded a star on the Hollywood Walk of Fame—the others being silent-film stars Rin Tin Tin and Strongheart. In 2005, the show business journal Variety named Lassie one of the "100 Icons of the Century"—the only animal star on the list.

== Media ==
=== Films ===
==== List of films ====
Year	Title	Role	Notes
1943	Lassie Come Home	Lassie	Principal role played by Pal
1945	Son of Lassie	Laddie	Principal role played by Pal
1946	Courage of Lassie	Bill (as credited; also called "Duke")	Principal role played by Pal
1948	Hills of Home	Lassie	Principal role played by Pal
1949	The Sun Comes Up	Lassie	Principal role played by Pal
1949	Challenge to Lassie	Lassie	Principal role played by Pal
1951	The Painted Hills	Shep	Principal role played by Pal
1963	Lassie's Great Adventure (TV film)	Lassie	Principal role; compilation of television episodes
1978	The Magic of Lassie	Lassie	Principal role played by Boy
1994	Lassie	Lassie	Principal role played by Howard
2005	Lassie	Lassie	Principal role played by Mason; Action scenes played by DR Dakota
2020	Lassie Come Home	Lassie	Principal role played by Lukas
2023	Lassie: A New Adventure	Lassie	

==== Box office performance ====
Title	Year	Worldwide Gross	Rotten Tomatoes
Lassie Come Home	1943	$4,517,000	94%
Son of Lassie	1945	TBA	TBA
Courage of Lassie	1946	$4,100,000	TBA
Hills of Home	1948	$2,312,000	TBA
The Sun Comes Up	1949	$2,044,000	TBA
Challenge to Lassie	1949	$1,155,000	TBA
The Magic of Lassie	1978	TBA	TBA
Lassie (1994)	1994	$9,979,683	87%
Lassie (2005)	2005	$6,442,854	93%
Lassie Come Home (2020)	2020	$3,683,655	N/A
Total gross/average rating		$34,234,192	91.3%

=== Radio ===
Year	Title	Role	Notes
1947–1948	Lassie Show	Lassie	Principal role; ABC series
1948–1950	Lassie Show	Lassie	Principal role; NBC series

=== Television ===
Year	Title	Role	Notes
1954–1973	Lassie	Lassie	Principal role
1968	The Adventures of Neeka	Lassie	Principal role; compilation of television episodes
1970	Peace is Our Profession	Lassie	Principal role; compilation of TV episodes
1970	Well of Love	Lassie	Principal role; compilation of TV episodes
1972	Joyous Sound	Lassie	Principal role; compilation of TV episodes
1972	Lassie and the Spirit of Thunder Mountain	Lassie	Principal role
1972–1973	Lassie's Rescue Rangers	Lassie	Principal role
1978	Lassie: The New Beginning	Lassie	Principal role; Television special
1980	Taxi	Lassie	Guest appearance (1 episode)
1989–1992	The New Lassie	Lassie	Principal role
1995	Space Ghost Coast to Coast	Lassie	Guest appearance (1 episode)
1996	Famous Dog Lassie	Lassie	Principal role
1997–1999	Lassie	Lassie	Principal role
2001	Whose Line Is It Anyway?	Lassie	Cameo appearance
2007	Lassie's Pet Vet	Lassie	Principal role
2014–2019	The New Adventures of Lassie	Lassie	Principal role

=== Games ===
Two English language board games based on the TV show have been published: one by Lisbeth Whiting in 1955 and another by Game Gems in 1965. A German language game was published by Noris Spiele in 1961.

A Lassie PS2 game was released in 2002.

=== Comics ===
A comic series ran from May 1950 to 1969 and lasted 70 issues. It was titled M-G-M's Lassie until issue #37, then just Lassie until the end of its run. It was published by Dell Comics until issue #59 Oct 1962, then by Gold Key.

=== Books ===
- Lassie Come-Home
- Lassie: The Prize
- Forest Ranger Handbook
- Lassie: A Boy's Best Friend & Buried Treasure
- Lassie: Party Nightmare & Water Watchdog
- Lassie: Skateboard Stunt & Danger Zone
- Lassie by Robert Weverka New York, Bantam Books 1978 (novelization of 1978 movie)
- Lassie by Sheila Black New York, Puffin Books 1994 (novelization of 1994 movie)

==== Seafarer Books ====
- Lassie and the Lost Little Sheep
- Lassie's Forest Adventure

==== Whitman Cozy-Corner ====
- Lassie: Rescue in the Storm

==== Whitman Novels ====
- Lassie and the Mystery of Blackberry Bog by Dorothea J. Snow ; illustrated by Ken Sawyer. New York : Golden Press, 1956
- Lassie and the Secret of the Summer by Dorothea J. Snow ; illustrated by Ken Sawyer. Racine, Wis. : Whitman Pub. Co., 1958.
- Lassie: Forbidden Valley by Doris Schroeder illustrated by Ken Sawyer Racine, Wis. : Whitman, 1959
- Lassie: Treasure Hunter by Charles S. Strong illustrated by Harry L. Timmons Racine, Wis. : Whitman, 1960
- Lassie: the Wild Mountain Trail by I. G. Edmonds illustrated by Larry Harris. Racine, Wis. : Whitman, 1966
- Lassie and the Mystery of Bristlecone Pine by Steve Frazee illustrated by Larry Harris. Racine, Wis. : Whitman, 1966
- Lassie and the Secret of the Smelter's Cave by Steve Frazee illustrated by Larry Harris. Racine, Wis. : Golden Press, 1968
- Lassie: Lost in the Snow
- Lassie: Trouble at Panter's Lake

==== Big Little Books ====
- Lassie: Adventure in Alaska
- Lassie and the Shabby Sheik
- Lassie: Old One Eye

==== Golden Books ====
- The Adventures of Lassie
- Lassie and Her Day in the Sun
- Lassie and Her Friends
- Lassie and the Big Clean-Up Day
- Lassie and the Daring Rescue
- Lassie and the Lost Explorer
- Lassie Shows the Way
- Lassie: The Great Escape

==== Tell-a-Tale Books ====
- Hooray for Lassie!
- Lassie and the Cub Scout
- Lassie and the Deer Mystery
- Lassie and the Firefighters
- Lassie and the Kittens
- Lassie Finds a Friend
- Lassie's Brave Adventure
- Lassie: The Busy Morning

==== Tip-Top Books ====
- Lassie: The Sandbar Rescue

==== Wonder Books ====
- Lassie's Long Trip

==== Marian Bray ====
- Lassie to the Rescue
- Lassie: Hayloft Hideout
- Lassie Under the Big Top
- Lassie: Treasure at Eagle Mountain
- Lassie: Danger at Echo Cliffs

==== The New Lassie ====
- The Puppy Problem
- Digging Up Danger
- The Big Blowup
- Water Watchdog
- Skateboard Dare
- Dangerous Party

== See also ==
- List of individual dogs
- List of fictional dogs
- Bessy, a Belgian comic strip inspired by the success of "Lassie" and which also featured a collie.
