= Jeanne Bartlett =

American screenwriter

Jeanne Bartlett (1903–1997) was an American screenwriter known for her work on early Lassie films. She worked as a writer for Metro-Goldwyn-Mayer (MGM) for fifteen years.

== Career ==
Bartlett played Daisy, the second victim of the werewolf, in Stuart Walker's 1935 film Werewolf of London. This was the only credited acting role of her career.

Bartlett later worked as a writer for MGM for fifteen years during the 1940s and 1950s.

Filmography
Film/TV Series	Credit	Year	Citation
Werewolf of London	Actor, played Daisy	1935	
Son of Lassie	Story and screenplay	1945	
Gallant Bass	Original story and screenplay	1947	
Man-Eater of Kumaon	Screenwriter	1948	
The Beachcomber	Writer	1962	

== Retirement ==
After retiring from writing, Bartlett was an active member of the conservationist movement in Malibu. She died in of pneumonia in Santa Monica, California in January 1997. She was 94 years old.
