= Walter Harris (author) =

British author and broadcaster (1925–2019)

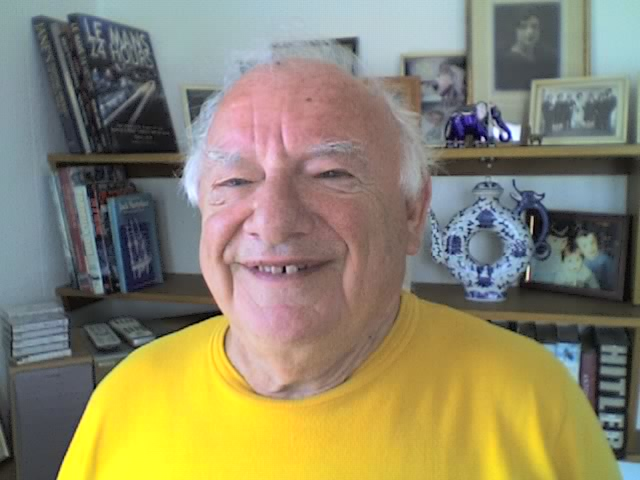
- Born: 15 October 1925
- Died: 9 May 2019 (aged 93)
- Occupations: Writer, broadcaster, journalist
- Writing career
- Pen name: Carl Dreadstone, E.K. Leyton
- Genres: Horror, thriller, historical fiction, science fiction
- Website: walterharrisauthorandbroadcaster.wordpress.com

Walter Harris (15 October 1925 – 9 May 2019) was a British author and broadcaster. He is the author of ten published novels, several volumes of poetry, numerous articles and spoken word recordings. Recordings of his interviews and broadcasts are held at the BBC Sound Archive and the British Library.

== Life and career ==
Harris joined the RAF directly from Haileybury in 1943. In Cairo he was German interpreter to Africa Korps POWs and playwright in RAF Repertory Company and news reader on the Forces Network.

Post War, Harris emigrated to Brazil and wrote for two English-language newspapers until being sponsored by a major Canadian-owned public utility, Brazilian Traction, to write and present a series of English-language radio shows on Radio Nacional, Rio de Janeiro.

Heading north, Harris became an accredited radio interviewer with the Canadian Broadcasting Corporation in the arts and entertainment field, mainly in New York. His first interviewee was TV impresario Ed Sullivan.

On his return to London, Harris began broadcasting for the BBC. He interviewed Peter Cook, Dudley Moore, Alan Bennett and Jonathan Miller on the opening night of Beyond the Fringe, and many noteworthy actors, authors and stars such as Danny Kaye, John Wayne, and W. Somerset Maugham.

He interviewed a number of thespians at various stages of their career, and representing every aspect of the theatre, for the archival record, THEATRE 60, which included interviews with Noël Coward, Albert Finney, Harold Pinter, Peter Ustinov, Peter Hall, and several others, as well as Kenneth Tynan representing theatre critics. The Gramophone reviewed THEATRE 60 as 'arguably one of the best spoken word records ever made'.

When Bob Guccione founded Penthouse, Harris contributed short stories and articles, and later became the new magazine's new motoring correspondent. At Guccione's suggestion Harris wrote his first novel Clovis published in England, France and America.

Harris recalled his interview with Noël Coward in a piece for The Times in 2009.

At the age of 90 Harris acquired a new job as a voice-over artist with Soho Voices.

He died on 9 May 2019 at the age of 93.

== Published novels ==
- Clovis (G.P. Putnam's & Sons: NY 1970)
- The Mistress of Downing Street (Michael Joseph 1972, Corgi edition 1973)
- Droop (W.H. Allen & Co 1974)
- The Day I Died (W.H. Allen & Co 1974) (new edition to be published by Heresy Publishing 2012)
- The Fifth Horseman (Panther Books 1976)
- Saliva (W.H. Allen & Co 1977)
- Creature from the Black Lagoon (1977) (novelisation of the 1954 film, written as Carl Dreadstone, UK edition as E.K. Leyton)
- Werewolf of London (1977) (novelisation of the 1935 film, written as Carl Dreadstone)
- The New Avengers: To Catch a Rat (Futura Publications 1977)
- Godhead (Patagonia Press 2014)

== Novelizations ==
Harris is one of the three authors who penned the six 'classic horror' novelizations credited to Carl Dreadstone and E.K. Leyton of which Harris wrote two: Werewolf of London and Creature from the Black Lagoon. Ramsey Campbell is one of the other 'Carl Dreadstones' and wrote three of the titles in the series, but the author of the sixth 'Dreadstone' title ("The Mummy") remains unknown.

Harris's New Avengers tie-in To Catch a Rat was published in 1977.
