= Detective's Wife =

American TV sitcom (1950)

- Starring: Lynn Bari; Donald Curtis
- Country of origin: United States
- Original language: English
- No. of seasons: 1
- No. of episodes: 13

Production
- Running time: 30 minutes

Original release
- Network: CBS
- Release: July 7 – September 29, 1950

Detectives's Wife is an American television sitcom that aired on CBS from July 7 to September 29, 1950. The series was the summer replacement for Man Against Crime.

== Synopsis ==
Set in New York City, the sustaining program focused on Adam Conway, a private detective, and his wife Connie, who always got involved in his cases. Episodes focused more on her involvement than on his work.

Lynn Bari portrayed Connie Conway, and Donald Curtis played Adam Conway. Bari narrated each episode in her first regular role on a TV series.

== Production ==
Franklin Schaffner was the producer and director, and the writer was Milton Lewis. or Mort Lewis. It was broadcast live from New York with a total of 14 episodes.

== Critical response ==
A review of the July 14, 1950, episode in the trade publication Billboard described the program as "a brightly satirical comedy-mystery series with some of the smartest dialog to hit video yet."

Jack Gould, writing in The New York Times, said that he gave up on the show's first episode after it became too complicated with five characters in addition to the two stars. "It takes more than a crowd to make a play," he concluded.

A review in the trade publication Variety said the show "makes a fairly amusing whodunit." It noted that the debut episode "foundered at times" but complimented Bari and Curtis on their work in the show.
