= Pal (dog) =

Rough Collie dog

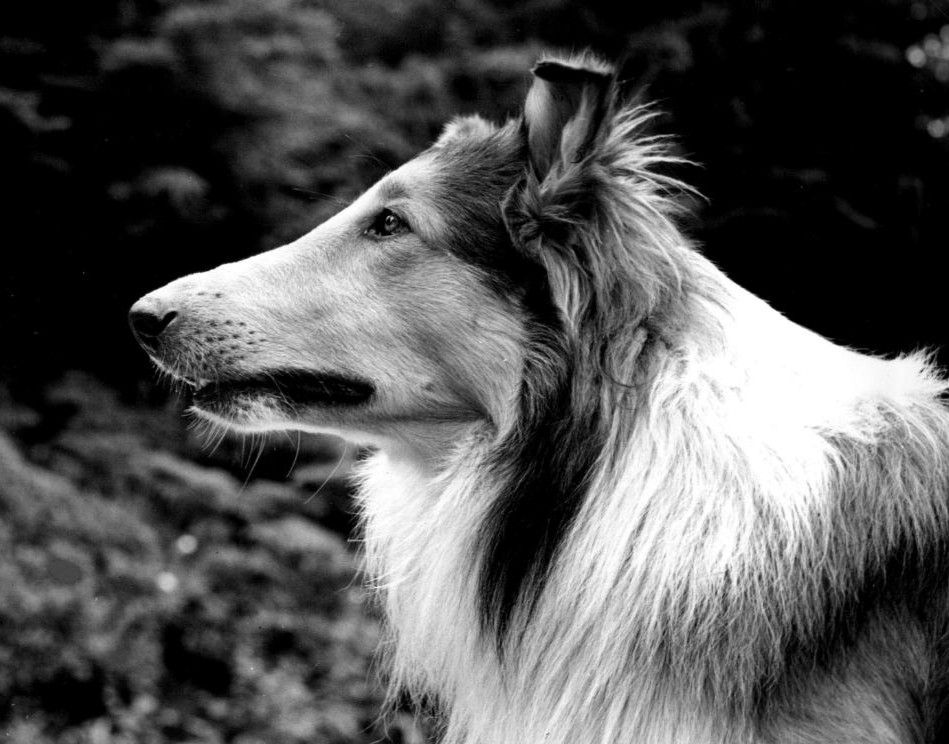
- Pal in 1942
- Other name: "Lassie"
- Species: Canis familiaris
- Breed: Rough Collie
- Sex: Male
- Born: June 4, 1940; Glamis Kennels in North Hollywood, California, United States
- Died: June 18, 1958 (aged 18); Rudd Weatherwax's home in North Hollywood, California, United States
- Occupation: Actor
- Years active: 1943–1954
- Term: 1943–1954
- Successor: Lassie Jr.
- Owner: Rudd Weatherwax
- Parents: Red Brucie of Glamis; Bright Bauble of Glamis
- Offspring: Lassie Jr.

Pal (Pal von Glamis) (June 4, 1940 – June 18, 1958) was a male Rough Collie performer and the first in a line of such dogs to portray the fictional female collie Lassie in film, on radio, and on television. In 1992, The Saturday Evening Post said Pal had "the most spectacular canine career in film history".

== MGM films ==
Pal in his first screen appearance as Lassie in MGM's Lassie Come Home (1943), with Roddy McDowall as Joe Carraclough

Pal's big break into the movies came in 1943 during the filming of the Metro-Goldwyn-Mayer film Lassie Come Home. The studios had decided to use a show collie trained by Frank Inn in the movie. A decision was made to take advantage of a massive flooding of the San Joaquin River in central California in order to obtain some spectacular footage for the film. Pal performed exceptionally well and the scene was completed in one take. Owner/trainer Rudd Weatherwax said director Fred M. Wilcox was so impressed with Pal during the sequence that he had "tears in his eyes." In response, producers released the female collie and hired Pal in her stead, reshooting the first six weeks of the filming with Pal now portraying Lassie. Other sources say that the female collie was replaced because she began to shed excessively during shooting of the film in the summer.

== Legacy ==
In 2000, the Lassie trademark was sold by the eight remaining members of the Weatherwax family to Classic Media (Classic Media was acquired by DreamWorks Animation in 2012 and renamed DreamWorks Classics. It ultimately became the property of the trademark’s current owners, Universal Studios, as of 2016). In 2004, Robert Weatherwax's personal contract to supply a dog to play the role of Lassie ended and neither side pursued a renewal. After several years of stand-in collies that were not related to the line, Classic Media contracted with Carol Riggins, who had been co-trainer with Robert Weatherwax, and her 9th generation dog HeyHey, who had played the role of Lassie during the last 13 episodes of the Canada Lassie series under the Weatherwax Trained Dogs banner. Carol Riggins continues today as the official owner and trainer of Lassie with another "Pal", a 10th generation direct descendant of the original Pal.

Pal was portrayed on the Snatch Game of Love challenge during the ninth season of RuPaul's Drag Race All Stars by contestant Gottmik.

== Filmography ==
=== Film ===
Year	Title	Role	Notes
1943	Lassie Come Home	Lassie	Principal role
1945	Son of Lassie	Laddie	Principal role
1946	Courage of Lassie	Bill	Principal role
1948	Hills of Home	Lassie	Principal role
1949	The Sun Comes Up	Lassie	Principal role
1950	Challenge to Lassie	Lassie	Principal role
1951	The Painted Hills	Shep	Principal role

=== Television ===
Year	Title	Role	Notes
1954	Lassie: "The Inheritance"	Lassie	Principal role
1955	Lassie: "The Well"	Lassie	Principal role

== See also ==
- List of individual dogs
