= Werewolf of London =

1935 film by Stuart Walker

- Theatrical release poster
- Directed by: Stuart Walker
- Written by: John Colton
- Story by: Robert Harris
- Produced by: Stanley Bergerman
- Starring: Henry Hull; Warner Oland; Lester Matthews; Spring Byington; Valerie Hobson
- Cinematography: Charles Stumar
- Edited by: Russell Schoengarth
- Music by: Karl Hajos
- Production company: Universal Pictures
- Distributed by: Universal Pictures
- Release date: May 13, 1935 (U.S.)
- Running time: 75 minutes
- Language: English
- Budget: $195,000

Werewolf of London is a 1935 horror film directed by Stuart Walker and starring Henry Hull as the titular werewolf. The supporting cast includes Warner Oland, Valerie Hobson, Lester Matthews, and Spring Byington. Jack Pierce, who is best known for creating the iconic makeup worn by Boris Karloff in the 1931 film Frankenstein, created the film's werewolf makeup. Produced by Universal Pictures, Werewolf of London was the first feature-length werewolf film.

== Plot ==
Wilfred Glendon, a wealthy and world-renowned English botanist, journeys to Tibet in search of the extremely rare plant Mariphasa lumina lupina, which is rumored to be nourished by the moon. While there, he is attacked and bitten by a feral humanoid creature, but he succeeds in acquiring a specimen of Mariphasa. He constructs a lamp that simulates moonlight in his London laboratory and waits for the plant to bloom.

At a party, Wilfred is approached by fellow botanist Dr. Yogami, who claims they met, briefly, in Tibet, where he also was seeking the Mariphasa. Yogami tells Glendon the plant is a temporary antidote for "werewolfery" (or "lycanthrophobia"), and responds to Wilfred's skepticism by claiming he knows of two men in London who are werewolves, having been bitten by another werewolf.

Eventually, one flower of the Mariphasa opens under Wilfred's moon lamp. When his hand grows fur in the artificial moonlight, he cuts the blossom and dabs its sap at the fur, and he is amazed to see the transformation reverse. Yogami visits, asking for two blossoms, as that night is the first of four nights around the full moon when the werewolves he mentioned will turn if left untreated, but Wilfred refuses. Before he goes, Yogami cautions that "the werewolf instinctively seeks to kill the thing it loves best."

While Wilfred researches werewolves, learning they must kill someone each night they transform, or they will not turn back, Yogami steals two newly opened Mariphasa flowers. Wilfred chooses not to accompany his wife, Lisa, and her childhood sweetheart, Paul Ames, who is back in town for a visit, to her Aunt Ettie's party. Soon after they leave, he transforms into a werewolf. Unable to reverse the process, he goes after Lisa, but Ettie's screams scare him away, so he settles for killing a random woman in the street. Although they all heard a loud howl, no one at the party, other than Ettie, saw the werewolf, so they think it is just her drunken hallucination.

When Paul reads in the newspaper about the woman Wilfred killed, he begins to believe Ettie's story, having heard of something similar while in the Yucatán, and tells his uncle, Colonel Forsythe, who is the chief of Scotland Yard, but Forsythe does not take him seriously. Since the last Mariphasa blossom has not opened yet, Wilfred rents a room for the night and locks himself inside, but breaks out after transforming. He sneaks into the zoo, where he sets a wolf free and kills a woman who has come for a tryst with the nightwatchman.

The next day, Yogami, out of Mariphasa blossoms, asks Forsythe to seize the plant from Wilfred, but Forsythe says he is looking for an escaped wolf, not a werewolf. Wilfred travels to Falden Abbey, his wife's family home in the country, and has the caretaker lock him in a room, but Lisa and Paul come to look around the property before Paul returns to California, and Wilfred, now a werewolf, sees them out the window. He breaks free and attacks, but Paul drives him off, recognizing him in the process. Paul tells Forsythe, who, though skeptical, agrees to investigate Wilfred. They are sidetracked when a dead chambermaid is found in Yogami's hotel room, which is too far from Falden for the supposed werewolf to have traveled there in one night, but Paul discovers Yogami's used Mariphasa blossoms, and Forsythe is convinced there are two werewolves on the loose.

The police search all day for Wilfred, who is hiding in his lab, waiting for the only remaining Mariphasa flower to bloom. When it does, Yogami enters and uses it, revealing that he was the werewolf who bit Wilfred in Tibet. Enraged, Wilfred attacks. He transforms during the struggle and kills Yogami, and then chases Lisa around the house, knocking Paul unconscious and causing Ettie to faint in the process. As he slowly closes in on his wife, Forsythe arrives and shoots him. Wilfred thanks Forsythe for the bullet and apologizes to Lisa for not being able to make her happier, before dying and reverting to his human form. Forsythe tells Lisa that he will write in his report that he accidentally shot Wilfred while Wilfred was trying to protect her.

== Cast ==
- Henry Hull as Dr. Wilfred Glendon
- Warner Oland as Dr. Yogami, of the University of Carpathia
- Valerie Hobson as Lisa Glendon, Wilfred's wife
- Lester Matthews as Paul Ames, Lisa's childhood boyfriend
- Lawrence Grant as Colonel Sir Thomas Forsythe, Paul's uncle and Lady Forsythe's son, who is the chief of Scotland Yard
- Spring Byington as Miss Ettie Coombes, Lisa's aunt
- Clark Williams as Hugh Renwick, Wilfred's friend and assistant in Tibet
- J. M. Kerrigan as Hawkins, Wilfred's lab assistant
- Charlotte Granville as Lady Alice Forsythe, Sir Thomas' mother and Paul's Grandmother
- Ethel Griffies as Mrs. Whack, Mrs. Moncaster's friend
- Zeffie Tilbury as Mrs. Moncaster, who rents Wilfred a room
- Jeanne Bartlett as Daisy, Alf's mistress, who is Wilfred's second victim
- Louis Vincenot as Wilfred's Head "Coolie" In Tibet (uncredited)
- Egon Brecher as The Priest Wilfred and Hugh meet in Tibet (uncredited)
- Joseph North as Plympton, the Glendon's butler (uncredited)
- Eole Galli as The Singer At Ettie's Party (uncredited)
- Amber Norman as Wilfred's First Victim (uncredited)
- Connie Leon as Millie, Yogami's chambermaid at Bedlington Hotel (uncredited)
- Harry Stubbs as Officer Jenkins, who discovered the first victim (uncredited)
- Herbert Evans as Detective Evans (uncredited)
- Tempe Pigott as Drunk (uncredited)
- James May as The Bartender (uncredited)
- Jeffrey Hassel as Alf, the nightwatchman at the zoo (uncredited)
- J. Gunnis Davis as Detective Tom (uncredited)
- George Kirby as Detective (uncredited)
- Reginald Barlow as Timothy, the caretaker at Falden Abbey (uncredited)

== Production ==
=== Casting ===
Originally, the film was intended to star Boris Karloff as Dr. Glendon and Bela Lugosi as Dr. Yogami, but it was filmed simultaneously with Bride of Frankenstein (1935), in which Karloff reprised his star-making role of Frankenstein's monster, so Universal decided to recast both parts; coincidentally, Valerie Hobson was the leading lady in both Werewolf of London and Bride of Frankenstein. Lugosi would subsequently portray the gypsy werewolf who bites Lon Chaney Jr.'s titular character in The Wolf Man (1941), which was a much smaller, though memorable, role.

=== Setting ===
Although the time period in which the film is set is not explicitly specified, Dr. Glendon drives a 1933 Alvis Speed 20.

=== Effects ===
Jack Pierce's original, more extensive design for the werewolf makeup was rejected in favor of a more minimalist approach. It has often been reported that Pierce's design was simplified because Henry Hull was unwilling to endure the hours that it would have taken to apply the original version of the makeup, or that Hull did not want his face obscured because of vanity. According to his great-nephew Cortlandt Hull, however, Hull, an accomplished makeup artist in his own right, argued that Pierce's original design obscured his face so much that it would contradict the script, which specified that other characters were able to recognize the werewolf as Glendon. Pierce resisted the change, so Hull went to studio head Carl Laemmle, and, much to Pierce's annoyance, Laemmle sided with Hull. Six years later, Pierce was able to use a design closely resembling his original version when he worked with Lon Chaney Jr. on The Wolf Man.

The werewolf's howl for the film is a blend of Hull's voice and a recording of an actual timber wolf, an approach that has not been used in any subsequent werewolf film.

=== Music ===
The film's score was composed by Karl Hajos, whose original compositions are interspersed with fragments of other pieces. Johann Strauss's "Tales from the Vienna Woods", Op. 325, can be heard during the party at Glendon Manor early in the film. "Scenes that are the brightest" from Act III of Vincent Wallace's opera Maritana (humorously misidentified by Aunt Ettie as being composed by the painter Botticelli) is sung with piano accompaniment at Aunt Ettie's party. Symphonic Poem No. 3 (Les préludes) by Franz Liszt is also heard, as well as compositions by Heinz Roemheld from the earlier Universal horror films The Invisible Man (1933) and The Black Cat (1934).

=== Dialogue ===
When Glendon is conversing with the Tibetan "coolies" in the beginning of the film, the actors playing the Tibetans are speaking Cantonese, rather than Lhasa Tibetan, while Hull is just muttering gibberish.

== Reception ==
In The New York Times, Frank S. Nugent called the film a "charming bit of lycanthropy", and ended his review by making reference to the fact that Werewolf of London was the last film to be shown at New York's Rialto Theatre before it was torn down and rebuilt:

Designed solely to amaze and horrify, the film goes about its task with commendable thoroughness, sparing no grisly detail and springing from scene to scene with even greater ease than that oft attributed to the daring young aerialist. Granting that the central idea has been used before, the picture still rates the attention of action-and-horror enthusiasts. It is a fitting valedictory for the old Rialto, which has become melodrama's citadel among Times Square's picture houses.

Other critics criticized the film's similarity to Rouben Mamoulian's Dr. Jekyll and Mr. Hyde (1931) with Fredric March, and it was a box office disappointment.

On review aggregator website Rotten Tomatoes, the film has an approval rating of 80% based on 15 reviews, with an average score of 6.6/10. In a retrospective review, film critic Leonard Maltin awarded it two-and-a-half out of four stars, calling the film "dated but still effective", and complimenting Oland's performance as Dr. Yogami.

== Legacy ==
Werewolf of London was re-released theatrically by Realart Pictures in 1951.

There have been two novelizations of the film. In 1977, a paperback novel written by Walter Harris, under the pseudonym "Carl Dreadstone", was published as part of a short-lived series of books based on classic Universal horror movies. The story is told from Glendon's (Note: Glendon's given name is spelled Wilfrid in the novel, differing from the film's spelling of Wilfred.) point-of-view, so the structure is very different from the plot of the film. The novel also has a different ending, in which Glendon decides to cooperate with Yogami, and they attempt to control their transformations with the aid of a hypnotist. The plan fails, and the hypnotist is killed, after which Glendon and Yogami transform and fight each other, resulting in Glendon killing Yogami, as in the film. After the mêlée, however, Glendon returns to human form, and the novel ends with him contemplating killing himself with the hypnotist's gun.

The second novelization, written by Carl Green, was published in 1985 as part of Crestwood House's hardcover Movie Monsters series, which was also based on the old Universal films. This book was considerably shorter than the first novelization, followed the plot of the film more closely, and was illustrated extensively with still frames from the film.

Musical references to the film include Warren Zevon's 1978 hit song "Werewolves of London", and Paul Roland's 1980 album and single The Werewolf of London.

The 1987 video game Werewolves of London is based on the film.

== See also ==
- Universal Monsters
- She-Wolf of London (1946)
