= The Sun Comes Up =

1949 film by Richard Thorpe

- VHS cover
- Directed by: Richard Thorpe
- Screenplay by: Margaret Fitts; William Ludwig; Eric Knight
- Based on: Mountain Prelude; 1947 serial story by Marjorie Kinnan Rawlings
- Produced by: Robert Sisk
- Starring: Jeanette MacDonald; Lloyd Nolan; Claude Jarman Jr. Pal (credited as "Lassie")
- Cinematography: Ray June
- Edited by: Cotton Warburton
- Music by: André Previn
- Distributed by: Metro-Goldwyn-Mayer
- Release date: January 27, 1949
- Running time: 93 minutes
- Country: United States
- Language: English
- Budget: $1,659,000
- Box office: $1,280,000 (Domestic earnings) $764,000 (Foreign earnings)

The Sun Comes Up is a 1949 Metro-Goldwyn-Mayer Technicolor drama picture with Lassie. Jeanette MacDonald had been off the screen for five years until her return in Three Daring Daughters (1948), but The Sun Comes Up was to be her last. In it, she had to share the screen not with an up-and-coming younger actress but with a very popular animal star. Although her retreat from a film career can be blamed largely on an increasingly debilitating heart ailment (which eventually took her life at the age of 61 in 1965), MacDonald continued to make concert and TV appearances after this. Her last radio performance was a broadcast version of this same story on The Screen Guild Theater in March 1950.

== Plot ==
Ex-opera singer Helen Lorfield Winter (Jeanette MacDonald) rents a house in the small town of Brushy Gap, in the hills not too far from the Smokies, Blue Ridge, and Atlanta, Georgia with her dog, Lassie, after the tragic death of her son. There she befriends Jerry, a young orphan (Claude Jarman Jr.). Growing attached to Jerry, but not wanting children so soon after the death of her own son, Helen leaves Brushy Gap to resume her singing career. While she is away, Jerry is caught in heavy rain returning Lassie home and develops pneumonia. Helen returns to Brushy Gap to find the owner of the house, Thomas Chandler (Lloyd Nolan), nursing Jerry back to health. Soon after Jerry has recovered, the orphanage catches on fire, and Lassie and Tom both rescue Jerry from the blaze. Helen then decides to adopt Jerry and remain in Brushy Gap.

== Main cast ==
- Pal (credited as "Lassie") as Lassie
- Jeanette MacDonald as Helen Lorfield Winter
- Lloyd Nolan as Thomas I. Chandler
- Claude Jarman Jr. as Jerry
- Lewis Stone as Arthur Norton
- Percy Kilbride as Mr. Willie B. Williegood
- Nicholas Joy as Victor Alvord
- Margaret Hamilton as Mrs. Golightly
- Hope Landin as Mrs. Pope
- Esther Somers as Susan, the maid
- Barbara Billingsley as the nurse

== Production ==
Parts of The Sun Comes Up were filmed in Glenwood, California, and lumber from the set was used to build the last town post office.

== Music ==
In 2010, Film Score Monthly released the complete scores of the seven Lassie feature films released by MGM between 1943 and 1955 as well as Elmer Bernstein’s score for It's a Dog's Life (1955) in the CD collection Lassie Come Home: The Canine Cinema Collection, limited to 1000 copies. Due to the era when these scores were recorded, nearly half of the music masters have been lost so the scores had to be reconstructed and restored from the best available sources, mainly the Music and Effects tracks as well as monaural ¼″ tapes.

The score for The Sun Comes Up was composed by André Previn.

Track listing for The Sun Comes Up (Disc 4)

1. Main Title*/New Trick for Lassie*/Hank’s Death* - 2:53
2. Helen Leaves Her Home*/Sleep in the Car*/Scenery*/Rabbits for Rent*/That’s a Bargain* - 4:27
3. I Had a Boy*/Jerry’s Wages* - 2:03
4. Adoption* 0:44
5. Long Walk*/Tears for Two*/Lassie Herds the Cows* - 4:28
6. Storm Over Jerry*/Helen Meets Tom*/I’m Going to Manville*/Pneumonia* - 4:23
7. I Always Eat It*/I Can’t Take Jerry Away*/Fare You Well* - 4:49
8. Tom & Jerry* - 3:35
9. Jerry Runs Away*/One Dog’s Family & End Title*/End Cast - 2:06

Bonus tracks

1. Tes Yeux (René Rabey) 0:51
2. Un Bel Di (Giacomo Puccini) 3:33
3. Songs My Mother Taught Me (Antonín Dvořák) 1:09
4. Cousin Ebeneezer (Previn–William Katz) 1:13
5. If You Were Mine (Previn–Katz) 1:46
6. Tom & Jerry*† (film version) 3:33
7. Jerry Runs Away*†/One Dog’s Family & End Title*†/End Cast (film version) - 2:06

Contains Sound Effects

†Contains Dialogue

Total Time: 43:71

== Reception ==
According to MGM records the film earned $2,044,000 at the box office, resulting in a loss of $549,000.

== Home media ==
On November 27, 2012, The Sun Comes Up was released on DVD through the Warner Archive.
