= The Painted Hills =

1951 film by Harold F. Kress

- Theatrical release poster
- Directed by: Harold F. Kress
- Screenplay by: True Boardman
- Based on: Shep of the Painted Hills; 1930 novel by Alexander Hull
- Produced by: Kenneth Bennett; Chester M. Franklin
- Starring: Pal (credited as Lassie); Paul Kelly; Bruce Cowling; Gary Gray
- Cinematography: Alfred Gilks; Harold Lipstein
- Edited by: Newell P. Kimlin
- Music by: Daniele Amfitheatrof
- Distributed by: Metro-Goldwyn-Mayer
- Release date: April 20, 1951
- Running time: 68 minutes
- Country: United States
- Language: English
- Budget: $667,000
- Box office: $1,085,000

The full film

The Painted Hills, also known as Lassie's Adventures in the Goldrush, is a 1951 Western drama film produced by Metro-Goldwyn-Mayer and directed by Harold F. Kress. The Painted Hills is the seventh and final MGM Lassie film.

Adapted by True Boardman from Alexander Hull's novel Shep of the Painted Hills, the film stars Paul Kelly, Bruce Cowling, Ann Doran and canine actor Pal (credited as Lassie) in a story about a collie named Shep who seeks retribution after her master is murdered. Technical advisor Nipo T. Strongheart worked with the Miwok people for their role in the film.

== Plot ==
Prospector Jonathan Harvey, whose faithful companion is a Rough Collie and a descendant of Lassie named Shep, is a friend of his deceased partner Martha Blake's family, including her son Tommy. After years of digging in the hills of California, he finally strikes gold. However, before he can share it with the Blakes, his greedy partner Lin Taylor kills him and attempts to lay claim to the gold. Lin poisons Shep, who nearly dies, and nearly kills Tommy, but Shep recovers and leads Lin into the mountains, where he falls from a cliff to his death.

== Cast ==
- Pal as Shep (credited as Lassie)
- Paul Kelly as Jonathan Harvey
- Bruce Cowling as Lin Taylor
- Gary Gray as Tommy Blake
- Ann Doran as Martha Blake
- Art Smith as Pilot Pete
- Andrea Virginia Lester as Mita
- Chief Yowlachie as Bald Eagle
- Brown Jug Reynolds as Red Wing

== Production ==
Bruce Cowling sustained serious injuries from a fall while on location during production. He underwent a hernia operation and was forced to withdraw from his next scheduled project, Across the Wide Missouri.

== Music ==
In 2010, Film Score Monthly released the complete scores of the seven Lassie feature films produced by MGM between 1943 and 1955, as well as Elmer Bernstein’s score for It's a Dog's Life (1955), in the CD collection Lassie Come Home: The Canine Cinema Collection, which was limited to 1,000 copies. Composed by Daniele Amfitheatrof, the score for The Painted Hills is contained on Disc 5 with a running time of 47:37, and includes the following tracks:

1. Main Title / He's a Millionaire (2:43)
2. I Need Your Help / Christmas / Hairy Present / Shep's Longing (4:36)
3. Back to Jonathan / Montage (1:28)
4. Visitor / Pilot Pete (1:43)
5. Holy Pete / Good Girl / Foul Play / Shep Follows Jonathan (9:55)
6. Hat / He Won't Be Back (3:08)
7. Poison / Indians Find Shep (4:09)
8. Rescue (2:04)
9. Incantation / Shep Lives / Shep Came Back (3:37)
10. Tommy Finds the Grave / Taylor Pursues Tommy / Tommy Is Hurt / The Hole / Thy Heavenly Kingdom (4:55)
11. Come Along, Son / The Chase—Revised / Freezing Up / Taylor Dies / Happy Ending & End Title (8:59)

Nearly half of the masters have been lost, so the scores were reconstructed and restored from the best available sources.

== Release ==
The Painted Hills opened in Los Angeles at the Loew's State and Grauman's Egyptian theaters on April 20, 1951 as the second feature to Soldiers Three.

== Reception ==
Critic Edwin Schallert of the Los Angeles Times wrote that the film "will compensate all those who have found Lassie one of the most interesting of screen acquisitions".

According to MGM records, the film earned $783,000 in the U.S. and Canada, and $302,000 elsewhere, resulting in a loss of $122,000.

== Legacy ==
Along with seven other MGM films released in the first half of 1951, the copyright on The Painted Hills lapsed after MGM neglected to file renewal applications in 1979. The film is now part of the public domain and has been released on VHS and DVD by a variety of companies.

The Painted Hills was featured in episode #510 of Mystery Science Theater 3000 (MST3K). The episode, which includes a short about hygiene entitled "Body Care and Grooming", premiered on Comedy Central on September 26, 1993. According to series writer Mary Jo Pehl, the character Pilot Pete was one of the favorites in the writers' room because of the "Pile on Pete" misinterpretation of his name.

The MST3K version of the film was included as part of the Mystery Science Theater 3000 Volume XXXI: The Turkey Day Collection DVD set, which was released by Shout Factory on November 25, 2014.
