= Samuel Marx =

American film producer

Samuel Marx (January 26, 1902, New York City – March 2, 1992, Los Angeles) was an American film producer, screenwriter and book author.

== Life ==
Marx was born to a Jewish family. and started working in 1919 as an office boy at the New York office of Universal Pictures, where he met Irving Thalberg, then secretary to Universal boss Carl Laemmle.

On May 24, 1930, he arrived at the Metro-Goldwyn-Mayer (MGM) Studios and was hired by Thalberg as Story Editor, the executive in charge of the screenwriting department.

Following Irving Thalberg's death in 1936, Marx became a producer and was behind a number of popular films, including Lassie Come Home (1943) and Son of Lassie (1945). During the 1950s he began working as an executive producer for Desilu Productions, where he was responsible for films and shows such as The General Electric Hour. During the 1970s, he returned to writing books, such as Mayer and Thalberg: The Make-Believe Saints (1975). Marx also helped Hollywood historians with their research for television shows. One such show, the TNT special series MGM: When the Lion Roars, was telecast in 1992 during the month Marx died of heart failure at age 90.

== Deadly Illusions ==
In 1990, Samuel Marx and Joyce Vanderveen published Deadly Illusions. Marx was MGM's Story Editor and a friend of both Paul Bern (husband of actress Jean Harlow) and Irving Thalberg at the time of Bern's death.

In 1932, Marx had gone to Bern's house before the police were informed of the body's discovery. Thalberg told Marx that Bern was dead, and that he should not go inside, but rather he should go home. The next day, Marx was among the studio executives who were told by Louis B. Mayer that, to avoid scandal, the death would have to be ruled "suicide because of impotence".

In the 1980s, Marx re-investigated the case, scrutinizing the available evidence. He concluded that Louis B. Mayer and Howard Strickling, MGM's head of publicity, with Irving Thalberg's collusion, had ordered the evidence be tampered with before the police arrived.

Marx concluded that Bern was murdered by his former common law wife, Dorothy Millette. Two days after Bern's death Millette jumped from the Delta King, a ferryboat traveling from San Francisco to Sacramento. Her shoes and her jacket were found on the boat by the place where she jumped from, while her body was found a few days later by men fishing on the Sacramento River.

Marx also concluded that the alleged "suicide note" had in fact been written by Bern some weeks prior to his death. Bern had given roses to Harlow to apologize for a minor quarrel about the secluded location of their home. With the roses was a note which was later presented as a false suicide note by Los Angeles District Attorney Buron Fitts, whom Mayer bribed to suppress the case.
