= Son of Lassie =

1945 film by S. Sylvan Simon

- Theatrical release poster
- Directed by: S. Sylvan Simon
- Screenplay by: Jeanne Bartlett
- Story by: Jeanne Bartlett
- Based on: some characters from Lassie Come Home (1943) novel by Eric Knight
- Produced by: Samuel Marx
- Starring: Pal (credited as Lassie); Peter Lawford; Donald Crisp; June Lockhart; Nigel Bruce
- Cinematography: Charles Schoenbaum
- Edited by: Ben Lewis
- Music by: Herbert Stothart
- Production company: Metro-Goldwyn-Mayer
- Distributed by: Loew's Inc.
- Release date: April 20, 1945
- Running time: 100 minutes
- Country: United States
- Language: English

Son of Lassie (also known as Laddie, Son of Lassie) is a 1945 American Technicolor drama film produced by Metro-Goldwyn-Mayer based on characters created by Eric Knight, and starring Peter Lawford, Donald Crisp, June Lockhart and Pal (credited as Lassie). A sequel to Lassie Come Home (1943), the film focuses on the now adult Joe Carraclough after he joins the Royal Air Force during World War II and is shot down over Nazi-occupied Norway along with a stowaway, Lassie's son "Laddie" – played by Pal. Son of Lassie was released theatrically on April 20, 1945.

== Plot ==
In England during World War II, the rough collie Lassie and her mischievous pup Laddie are devoted to their young master, Joe Carraclough, who is training in the Royal Air Force. Joe's father Sam is kennel man for the Duke of Rudling, and he is put in charge of a British Army war dogs training school on the Duke's Yorkshire estate. Lassie is too old for military service, but the day before Joe begins active duty as a flight navigator, Laddie is enrolled in the school. He lacks the discipline of the other dogs, but is resourceful.

Laddie follows Joe to the air base, 40 miles away. For a reconnaissance flight over Nazi-occupied Norway, Joe's pilot arranges to have Laddie on board. The plane is hit and Joe bails out with Laddie in his arms. On the ground, the two are separated. Joe finds refuge in a church while Laddie is cared for by some children; the Nazis search for them both.

Determined to return to England, Joe makes his way cross-country with the help of the Norwegian underground. All the while, Laddie is trying to find him. Joe is captured by the Nazis, but has escaped by the time Laddie tracks him to the prison camp. The Nazis use Laddie to find Joe; reunited, the pair escape. They complete the journey home to the Rudling estate, where Lassie and Sam Carraclough have been patiently awaiting them, along with the Duke's granddaughter Priscilla, who intends to marry Joe.

== Cast ==
- Pal (credited as "Lassie") as Lassie and grown-up Laddie
- Peter Lawford as Joe Carraclough
- Donald Crisp as Sam Carraclough, Joe's father
- June Lockhart as Priscilla, the Duke of Rudling's granddaughter
- Nigel Bruce as Duke of Rudling, grandfather to Priscilla
- Donald Curtis as Sgt. Eddie Brown
- Robert Lewis as Sgt. Schmidt
- Nils Asther as Olav
- William Severn as Henrik
- Leon Ames as Anton
- Fay Helm as Joanna
- Terry Moore as Thea (as Helen Koford, her birth name)

== Production ==
Produced under the working title, Laddie, Son of Lassie, the film originally had Elsa Lanchester playing the role of the adult Priscilla. Shortly after filming began, June Lockhart took over the role. It was the first movie filmed using the Technicolor monopack method.

Principal filming began May 22, 1944 and ended in mid-November at the Metro-Goldwyn-Mayer studios in Culver City, California. Location shooting also took place in Jackson Hole, Wyoming and various locations throughout western Canada, including Vancouver Island and Christopher Point in British Columbia and Banff National Park in Alberta.

The wartime airfield scenes were shot at the air base at Patricia Bay which is now Victoria International Airport. The aircraft used included Curtiss P-40 Warhawk fighters, Bristol Bolingbroke and Lockheed Ventura bombers of the Royal Canadian Air Force.

According to The Hollywood Reporter, John Charles Reed sued MGM in October 1947 for plagiarism, claiming the film script was based on his 1943 story "Candy". The jury disagreed and the suit was dismissed.

Son of Lassie reportedly popularized the name "Lad" for male dogs. Pal, the original male collie who played Lassie in Lassie Come Home (1943) played Laddie. A 20-year-old June Lockhart, whose screen career had consisted of bit parts, had a more meaningful connection to the iconic Lassie story when in 1958, she took on the role of Ruth Martin, who adopts orphan Timmy (Jon Provost) in the long-running TV series Lassie.

== Music ==
In 2010, Film Score Monthly released the complete scores of the seven Lassie feature films released by MGM between 1943 and 1955 as well as Elmer Bernstein's score for It's a Dog's Life (1955) in the CD collection Lassie Come Home: The Canine Cinema Collection, limited to 1000 copies. Due to the era when these scores were recorded, nearly half of the music masters have been lost so the scores had to be reconstructed and restored from the best available sources, mainly the Music and Effects tracks as well as monaural ¼″ tapes.

The score for Son of Lassie was composed by Herbert Stothart. Many of the Norwegian scenes use themes from Norwegian composer Edvard Grieg, notably the Piano Concerto and the Peer Gynt Suite.

Track listing for Son of Lassie (Disc 2)

1. Main Title/Laddie (beginning)* - 2:14
2. Mischievous Puppy/My First Cake - 3:42
3. Say It/Rudling Kennels - 3:24
4. Training Routine (Stothart–Castelnuovo-Tedesco) - 2:41
5. That’s Where His Heart Is/Lowering the Colors - 2:20
6. Bull Terrier/Infraction of Regulations - 3:13
7. Laddie at Airfield & Waiting Dog (Stothart–Castelnuovo-Tedesco) - 3:21
8. Planes Taxiing/Plane Overdue - 4:52
9. Parachute Landing (Stothart–Castelnuovo-Tedesco) - 4:20
10. Underground (Stothart–Castelnuovo-Tedesco)/Disconsolate Laddie (damaged) (Stothart–Castelnuovo-Tedesco) - 4:14
11. Occupied Village/Locked Storage - 3:40
12. Injured Dog* (Castelnuovo-Tedesco)/Of Viking Ancestry - 5:49
13. It Should Be Christmas - 0:54
14. Frantic Dog (Castelnuovo-Tedesco) - 4:43
15. Leading the Blind (Stothart–Castelnuovo-Tedesco) - 1:15
16. Reprise (Stothart–Castelnuovo-Tedesco) - 1:14
17. Passport - 2:13
18. It’s Laddie (Stothart–Castelnuovo-Tedesco) - 0:40
19. Seeking His Master (Stothart–Castelnuovo-Tedesco) - 1:41
20. Clown Sergeant/The Escape (Stothart–Castelnuovo-Tedesco)/Through the Rapids (Castelnuovo-Tedesco) - 8:34
21. Back to the Yorkshire Moors - 0:38
22. Final Episode - 2:04
23. Overseas Title - 0:15

Contains Sound Effects

Total Time: 68:48

== Release ==
Son of Lassie was released to theaters on April 20, 1945. A VHS home video release came on September 1, 1998. It was first released to Region 1 DVD by Warner Home Video on August 24, 2004. It was re-released on November 7, 2006 in a three-movie, 2-disc set along Lassie Come Home and Courage of Lassie.

== Reception ==
Bosley Crowther in The New York Times of June 11, 1945, felt the sequel to Lassie Come Home fell short of "being a worthy heir to the champion."

Variety characterized the principal actors as "excellent" but the film was "sticky sentiment, and flamboyant adventures, carry[ing] sufficient interest to move it along."
