= Robert Sisk =

American film producer (1903–1964)

Robert F. Sisk (March 20, 1903 – February 25, 1964) was an American film producer.

Sources differ as to his birthplace, with some indicating Maryland and others specifying the unincorporated village of Pokeshaw in the Canadian province of New Brunswick. After working as a reporter for The Baltimore Sun and Variety, he began working as a publicity director, first for the Theatre Guild and then for RKO Pictures. In the late 1930s he became a producer and made a number of movies with John Farrow at RKO, including Five Came Back (1939). He later worked at MGM and produced for TV.

His wife died in 1957. They had one daughter. Sisk died in Los Angeles at age 60.

== Select credits ==
- Little Women (1933)
- The Three Musketeers (1935)
- Annie Oakley (1935)
- The Plough and the Stars (1936)
- The Saint Strikes Back (1939)
- Five Came Back (1939)
- A Bill of Divorcement (1940)
- The Forest Rangers (1942)
- Love Laughs at Andy Hardy (1946)
- Courage of Lassie (1946)
- Master of Lassie (1948)
- The Sun Comes Up (1949)
- Challenge to Lassie (1949)
- Tension (1949)
- Across the Wide Missouri (1951)
