= Lassie Come-Home =

1940 novel by Eric Knight

- First edition
- Author: Eric Knight
- Illustrator: Marguerite Kirmse
- Language: English
- Publisher: The John C. Winston Company
- Publication date: 1940
- Publication place: United Kingdom
- Media type: Print
- Pages: 248
- OCLC: 1873844
- LC Class: PR 6021 N417

Lassie Come-Home is a novel written by Eric Knight about a Rough Collie's trek over many miles to be reunited with the boy she loves. Knight had introduced the reading public to the canine character of Lassie in a magazine story published on 17 December 1938, in The Saturday Evening Post, a story which he later expanded to the novel and published in 1940 to critical and commercial success. In 1943, the novel was adapted to the Metro-Goldwyn-Mayer feature film Lassie Come Home starring Roddy McDowall as the boy Joe Carraclough, Pal as Lassie, and featuring Elizabeth Taylor. The motion picture was selected for inclusion in the National Film Registry. A remake of Lassie Come Home, entitled Lassie, was released in 2005.

The hyphen in the title is both an adjective referring to Lassie's purpose as a dog that must turn home and it is the name given to the dog in the final chapter where the boy says to the dog: "Ye brought us luck. 'Cause ye're a come-homer. Ye're my Lassie Come-Home. Lassie Come-Home. That's thy name! Lassie Come-Home". In another part of the book, Hynes, a cynical character who oversees the Duke of Rudling's animals, falsely accuses the Carraclough family of training such dogs for fraud: "I know all about yer and yer come-home dogs. Training 'em to break loose and run right back 'ome when they're sold, so then ye can sell 'em to someone else." Film adaptations of the novel do not include the hyphen.

== Reception ==
Lassie Come-Home won the 1943 Young Reader's Choice Award.

Awards
Preceded by By the Shores of Silver Lake	Young Reader's Choice Award recipient 1943	Succeeded by The Black Stallion
