= Film Score Monthly =

American online music magazine

- Editor: Lukas Kendall
- Categories: online music magazine
- Publisher: Lukas Kendall
- Founded: 1990
- Final issue: 2005 (print)
- Country: United States
- Based in: Los Angeles
- Language: English
- Website: www.filmscoremonthly.com
- ISSN: 1077-4289

Film Score Monthly is an online magazine (and former print magazine) founded by editor-in-chief and executive producer Lukas Kendall in June 1990 as The Soundtrack Correspondence List. It is dedicated to the art of film and television scoring.

Film Score Monthly released 250 film and television scores on CD between 1996 and 2013. The International Film Music Critics Association named it Soundtrack Label of the Year in 2004 and Film Music Record Label of the Year in 2005.

== History ==
Silver Age Classics and Golden Ages Classics logos used for albums released under the Film Score Monthly banner

Original Retrograde Records logo

In September 1991, Film Score Monthly began as The Soundtrack Club, a pamphlet sized publication maintained by Lukas Kendall, who was attending Amherst College at the time. In June 1992, the publication was renamed Film Score Monthly and, upon Kendall's graduation in 1996, relocated its base of operations to Los Angeles. At the same time Film Score Monthly revamped its format, introduced full-color covers, increased its length and enjoyed the peak of its circulation. FSM existed in this guise for nearly a decade.

In 2005, it was announced that the magazine would cease publication of the print edition and move online-only where it could include multi-media content and address the technological advances inherent to the Web in the 21st century.

Regular staff includes: Managing Editor, Tim Curran; Executive Editor, Jon Kaplan; Editor in Absentia, Jeff Bond; Contributor at Large, Doug Adams; Creative Advisor, Joe Sikoryak; Editorial Consultant, Al Kaplan.

In 2013, backissues of the print edition of Film Score Monthly were put online free of charge.

- Print backissues 1990–2005

== Podcasts ==
In 2005, Film Score Monthly began producing a podcast, available through the online magazine, on iTunes (as well as other podcatchers) and on websites hosting direct downloads. Many of the magazine contributors participate in these podcast discussions. The official FSM podcast archive is hosted here.

== CD catalog ==
Film Score Monthly released film and television scores on CD from 1996 to 2013. Many are scores of historical significance; some date back half a century or more. A detailed discography and notes are available on the official site.

#	catalog num	release date	line	# discs	title184	year	composer	OOP
1	FSM-80123	May 1996	Retrograde	1	The Taking of Pelham One Two Three	1974	David Shire	
2	FSM-80124	August 1997	Retrograde	1	Deadfall	1968	John Barry	
3	FSM-80125	August 1998	Retrograde	1	Mad Monster Party	1969	Maury Laws	yes
4	Vol. 1, No. 1	May 1998	Silver Age	1	Stagecoach	1966	Jerry Goldsmith	
4	Vol. 1, No. 1	May 1998	Silver Age	1	The Loner	1975	Jerry Goldsmith	
5	Vol. 1, No. 2	July 1998	Silver Age	1	The Poseidon Adventure	1972	John Williams	yes
5	Vol. 1, No. 2	July 1998	Silver Age	1	The Paper Chase	1973	John Williams	yes
6	Vol. 1, No. 3	September 1998	Silver Age	1	Fantastic Voyage	1966	Leonard Rosenman	yes
7	Vol. 1, No. 4	January 1999	Silver Age	2	The Return of Dracula	1958	Gerald Fried	
7	Vol. 1, No. 4	January 1999	Silver Age	2	I Bury the Living	1958	Gerald Fried	
7	Vol. 1, No. 4	January 1999	Silver Age	2	The Cabinet of Caligari	1962	Gerald Fried	
7	Vol. 1, No. 4	January 1999	Silver Age	2	Mark of the Vampire	1957	Gerald Fried	
8	Vol. 2, No. 1	March 1999	Silver Age	1	100 Rifles	1969	Jerry Goldsmith	
9	Vol. 2, No. 2	April 1999	Silver Age	1	Patton	1970	Jerry Goldsmith	yes
9	Vol. 2, No. 2	April 1999	Silver Age	1	The Flight of the Phoenix	1965	Frank DeVol	yes
10	Vol. 2, No. 3	May 1999	Golden Age	1	Prince Valiant	1954	Franz Waxman	yes
11	Vol. 2, No. 4	June 1999	Silver Age	1	Monte Walsh	1970	John Barry	yes
12	Vol. 2, No. 5	July 1999	Golden Age	1	Prince of Foxes	1949	Alfred Newman	
13	Vol. 2, No. 6	September 1999	Silver Age	1	The Comancheros	1961	Elmer Bernstein	
14	Vol. 2, No. 7	November 1999	Golden Age	1	All About Eve	1950	Alfred Newman	
14	Vol. 2, No. 7	November 1999	Golden Age	1	Leave Her to Heaven	1945	Alfred Newman	
15	Vol. 2, No. 8	December 1999	Silver Age	1	Rio Conchos	1964	Jerry Goldsmith	yes
16	Vol. 2, No. 9	January 2000	Silver Age	1	The Flim-Flam Man	1967	Jerry Goldsmith	
16	Vol. 2, No. 9	January 2000	Silver Age	1	A Girl Named Sooner	1975	Jerry Goldsmith	
17	Vol. 3, No. 1	February 2000	Silver Age	1	Take a Hard Ride	1975	Jerry Goldsmith	yes
18	Vol. 3, No. 2	March 2000	Silver Age	1	The Omega Man	1971	Ron Grainer	yes
19	Vol. 3, No. 3	April 2000	Silver Age	1	Beneath the Planet of the Apes	1970	Leonard Rosenman	yes
20	Vol. 3, No. 4	May 2000	Silver Age	1	Tora! Tora! Tora!	1970	Jerry Goldsmith	yes
21	Vol. 3, No. 5	July 2000	Silver Age	1	A Guide for the Married Man	1967	John Williams	
22	Vol. 3, No. 6	September 2000	Silver Age	1	The Undefeated	1969	Hugo Montenegro	yes
22	Vol. 3, No. 6	September 2000	Silver Age	1	Hombre	1967	David Rose	yes
23	Vol. 3, No. 7	November 2000	Silver Age	1	Batman	1966	Nelson Riddle	yes
24	Vol. 3, No. 8	December 2000	Golden Age	1	From the Terrace	1960	Elmer Bernstein	
25	Vol. 3, No. 9	January 2001	Silver Age	1	The Stripper	1963	Jerry Goldsmith	
25	Vol. 3, No. 9	January 2001	Silver Age	1	Nick Quarry	1968	Jerry Goldsmith	
26	Vol. 3, No. 10	February 2001	Golden Age	1	Beneath the 12-Mile Reef	1953	Bernard Herrmann	yes
27	Vol. 4, No. 1	February 2001	Silver Age	1	Conquest of the Planet of the Apes	1972	Tom Scott	
27	Vol. 4, No. 1	February 2001	Silver Age	1	Battle for the Planet of the Apes	1973	Leonard Rosenman	
28	Vol. 4, No. 2	March 2001	Golden Age	1	How to Marry a Millionaire	1953	Alfred Newman & Cyril Mockridge	
29	Vol. 4, No. 3	April 2001	Silver Age	1	The Towering Inferno	1974	John Williams	yes
30	Vol. 4, No. 4	April 2001	Golden Age	1	Untamed	1955	Franz Waxman	
31	Vol. 4, No. 5	May 2001	Golden Age	1	The Egyptian	1954	Alfred Newman & Bernard Herrmann	
32	Vol. 4, No. 6	May 2001	Silver Age	1	The French Connection	1971	Don Ellis	yes
32	Vol. 4, No. 6	May 2001	Silver Age	1	French Connection II	1975	Don Ellis	yes
33	Vol. 4, No. 7	June 2001	Golden Age	1	A Man Called Peter	1955	Alfred Newman	
34	Vol. 4, No. 8	June 2001	Silver Age	1	Room 222	1969	Jerry Goldsmith	
34	Vol. 4, No. 8	June 2001	Silver Age	1	Ace Eli and Rodger of the Skies	1973	Jerry Goldsmith	
35	Vol. 4, No. 9	July 2001	Golden Age	1	Between Heaven and Hell	1956	Hugo Friedhofer	
35	Vol. 4, No. 9	July 2001	Golden Age	1	Soldier of Fortune	1955	Hugo Friedhofer	
36	Vol. 4, No. 10	July 2001	Silver Age	1	Voyage to the Bottom of the Sea	1961	Paul Sawtell & Bert Shefter	yes
37	Vol. 4, No. 11	August 2001	Golden Age	1	The Best of Everything	1959	Alfred Newman	
38	Vol. 4, No. 12	August 2001	Silver Age	1	Morituri	1965	Jerry Goldsmith	yes
38	Vol. 4, No. 12	August 2001	Silver Age	1	Raid on Entebbe	1976	David Shire	yes
39	Vol. 4, No. 13	September 2001	Golden Age	1	The Bravados	1958	Alfred Newman & Hugo Friedhofer	
40	Vol. 4, No. 14	September 2001	Silver Age	1	The Illustrated Man	1969	Jerry Goldsmith	
41	Vol. 4, No. 15	November 2001	Golden Age	1	The View from Pompey's Head	1955	Elmer Bernstein	
41	Vol. 4, No. 15	November 2001	Golden Age	1	Blue Denim	1959	Bernard Herrmann	
42	Vol. 4, No. 16	November 2001	Silver Age	1	The World of Henry Orient	1964	Elmer Bernstein	
43	Vol. 4, No. 17	November 2001	Silver Age	1	John Goldfarb, Please Come Home	1965	John Williams	
44	Vol. 4, No. 18	December 2001	Golden Age	1	Broken Lance	1954	Leigh Harline	
45	Vol. 4, No. 19	January 2002	Golden Age	1	Demetrius and the Gladiators	1954	Franz Waxman	
46	Vol. 4, No. 20	January 2002	Silver Age	1	Farewell, My Lovely	1975	David Shire	
46	Vol. 4, No. 20	January 2002	Silver Age	1	Monkey Shines	1988	David Shire	
47	Vol. 5, No. 1	February 2002	Golden Age	1	Lust for Life	1956	Miklós Rózsa	
48	Vol. 5, No. 2	January 2002	Silver Age	1	Logan's Run	1976	Jerry Goldsmith	
49	Vol. 5, No. 3	March 2002	Golden Age	1	Joy in the Morning	1965	Bernard Herrmann	
50	Vol. 5, No. 4	March 2002	Silver Age	1	The Man Who Loved Cat Dancing	1973	John Williams / Michel Legrand	
51	Vol. 5, No. 5	April 2002	Golden Age	1	36 Hours	1965	Dimitri Tiomkin	
52	Vol. 5, No. 6	April 2002	Silver Age	1	The Traveling Executioner	1970	Jerry Goldsmith	
53	Vol. 5, No. 7	June 2002	Golden Age	1	On the Beach	1959	Ernest Gold	
53	Vol. 5, No. 7	June 2002	Golden Age	1	The Secret of Santa Vittoria	1969	Ernest Gold	
54	Vol. 5, No. 8	June 2002	Silver Age	1	Point Blank	1967	Johnny Mandel	
54	Vol. 5, No. 8	June 2002	Silver Age	1	The Outfit	1973	Jerry Fielding	
55	Vol. 5, No. 9	July 2002	Golden Age	1	The Prodigal	1955	Bronislau Kaper	
56	Vol. 5, No. 10	July 2002	Silver Age	1	I Spy	1965–68	Earle Hagen	
57	Vol. 5, No. 11	August 2002	Golden Age	1	Above and Beyond	1952	Hugo Friedhofer	
58	Vol. 5, No. 12	August 2002	Silver Age	1	The Gypsy Moths	1969	Elmer Bernstein	
59	Vol. 5, No. 13	September 2002	Golden Age	1	Scaramouche	1952	Victor Young	
60	Vol. 5, No. 14	September 2002	Silver Age	1	The Green Berets	1968	Miklós Rózsa	
61	Vol. 5, No. 15	October 2002	Golden Age	1	The World, the Flesh and the Devil	1959	Miklós Rózsa	
62	Vol. 5, No. 16	October 2002	Silver Age	1	The Prize	1963	Jerry Goldsmith	
63	Vol. 5, No. 17	November 2002	Golden Age	1	The Seventh Sin	1957	Miklós Rózsa	
64	Vol. 5, No. 18	November 2002	Silver Age	2	The Man from U.N.C.L.E.	1964–68	Jerry Goldsmith & various	
65	Vol. 5, No. 19	January 2003	Golden Age	1	Tribute to a Bad Man	1956	Miklós Rózsa	
66	Vol. 5, No. 20	January 2003	Silver Age	1	Never So Few	1959	Hugo Friedhofer	
66	Vol. 5, No. 20	January 2003	Silver Age	1	7 Women	1966	Elmer Bernstein	
67	Vol. 6, No. 1	February 2003	Golden Age	1	Plymouth Adventure	1952	Miklós Rózsa	
68	Vol. 6, No. 2	February 2003	Silver Age	1	Ice Station Zebra	1968	Michel Legrand	
69	Vol. 6, No. 3	February 2003	Golden Age	1	Home from the Hill	1960	Bronislau Kaper	
70	Vol. 6, No. 4	February 2003	Silver Age	1	THX 1138	1971	Lalo Schifrin	
71	Vol. 6, No. 5	April 2003	Golden Age	1	Green Fire	1954	Miklós Rózsa	
71	Vol. 6, No. 5	April 2003	Golden Age	1	Bhowani Junction	1956	Miklós Rózsa	
72	Vol. 6, No. 6	April 2003	Silver Age	1	All Fall Down	1962	Alex North	
72	Vol. 6, No. 6	April 2003	Silver Age	1	The Outrage	1964	Alex North	
73	Vol. 6, No. 7	May 2003	Golden Age	2	Knights of the Round Table	1953	Miklós Rózsa	
73	Vol. 6, No. 7	May 2003	Golden Age	2	The King's Thief	1955	Miklós Rózsa	
74	Vol. 6, No. 8	May 2003	Silver Age	1	Soylent Green	1973	Fred Myrow	
74	Vol. 6, No. 8	May 2003	Silver Age	1	Demon Seed	1977	Jerry Fielding	
75	Vol. 6, No. 9	June 2003	Golden Age	1	The Adventures of Huckleberry Finn	1960	Jerome Moross	
76	Vol. 6, No. 10	June 2003	Silver Age	1	Our Mother's House	1967	Georges Delerue	
76	Vol. 6, No. 10	June 2003	Silver Age	1	The 25th Hour	1967	Georges Delerue	
77	Vol. 6, No. 11	June 2003	Silver Age	1	The Appointment	1969	John Barry, Stu Phillips, Michel Legrand	
78	Vol. 6, No. 12	July 2003	Golden Age	1	Toys in the Attic	1963	George Duning	
79	Vol. 6, No. 13	July 2003	Silver Age	1	Hawkins On Murder	1973	Jerry Goldsmith	
79	Vol. 6, No. 13	July 2003	Silver Age	1	Winter Kill	1974	Jerry Goldsmith	
79	Vol. 6, No. 13	July 2003	Silver Age	1	Babe	1975	Jerry Goldsmith	
80	Vol. 6, No. 14	September 2003	Golden Age	1	The Cobweb	1955	Leonard Rosenman	
80	Vol. 6, No. 14	September 2003	Golden Age	1	Edge of the City	1957	Leonard Rosenman	
81	Vol. 6, No. 15	September 2003	Silver Age	1	Wild Rovers	1971	Jerry Goldsmith	
82	Vol. 6, No. 16	October 2003	Golden Age	1	The Brothers Karamazov	1958	Bronislau Kaper	
83	Vol. 6, No. 17	August 2003	Silver Age	2	The Man From U.N.C.L.E. Volume 2	1964–68	Jerry Goldsmith, various	
84	Vol. 6, No. 18	November 2003	Golden Age	1	On Dangerous Ground	1952	Bernard Herrmann	
85	Vol. 6, No. 19	November 2003	Silver Age	1	McQ	1974	Elmer Bernstein	yes
86	Vol. 6, No. 20	December 2003	Golden Age	1	Moonfleet	1955	Miklós Rózsa	
87	Vol. 6, No. 21	January 2004	Silver Age	2	Where Eagles Dare	1968	Ron Goodwin	
87	Vol. 6, No. 21	January 2004	Silver Age	2	Operation Crossbow	1965	Ron Goodwin	
88	Vol. 7, No. 1	February 2004	Golden Age	1	The Prisoner of Zenda	1952	Alfred Newman, Conrad Salinger	
89	Vol. 7, No. 2	February 2004	Silver Age	1	Khartoum	1966	Frank Cordell	
89	Vol. 7, No. 2	February 2004	Silver Age	1	Mosquito Squadron	1969	Frank Cordell	
90	Vol. 7, No. 3	March 2004	Golden Age	2	Diane	1956	Miklós Rózsa	
91	Vol. 7, No. 4	March 2004	Silver Age	1	Logan's Run: TV Series	1977	Laurence Rosenthal & Bruce Broughton	
92	Vol. 7, No. 5	April 2004	Golden Age	1	The Swan	1956	Bronislau Kaper	
93	Vol. 7, No. 6	April 2004	Silver Age	2	The Shoes of the Fisherman	1968	Alex North	
94	Vol. 7, No. 7	May 2004	Golden Age	1	The Fastest Gun Alive	1956	André Previn	
94	Vol. 7, No. 7	May 2004	Golden Age	1	House of Numbers	1957	André Previn	
95	Vol. 7, No. 8	May 2004	Silver Age	1	Big Wednesday	1978	Basil Poledouris	
96	Vol. 7, No. 9	July 2004	Golden Age	1	Julius Caesar	1953	Miklós Rózsa	
97	Vol. 7, No. 10	July 2004	Silver Age	1	Born Free	1966	John Barry	
98	Vol. 7, No. 11	August 2004	Golden Age	1	Cimarron	1960	Franz Waxman	
99	Vol. 7, No. 12	August 2004	Silver Age	1	Ride the High Country	1962	George Bassman	
99	Vol. 7, No. 12	August 2004	Silver Age	1	Mail Order Bride	1964	George Bassman	
100	Vol. 7, No. 13	September 2004	Golden Age	1	I'll Cry Tomorrow	1955	Alex North	
101	Vol. 7, No. 14	September 2004	Silver Age	2	The Man from U.N.C.L.E. Volume 3, featuring The Girl from U.N.C.L.E.	1964–68; 1966–67	Jerry Goldsmith & various	
102	Vol. 7, No. 15	October 2004	Golden Age	1	Saddle the Wind	1958	Elmer Bernstein, Jeff Alexander	
103	Vol. 7, No. 16	October 2004	Silver Age	3	Mutiny on the Bounty	1962	Bronislau Kaper	
104	Vol. 7, No. 17	December 2004	Golden Age	1	Valley of the Kings	1954	Miklós Rózsa	
104	Vol. 7, No. 17	December 2004	Golden Age	1	Men of the Fighting Lady	1954	Miklós Rózsa	
105	Vol. 7, No. 18	December 2004	Silver Age	2	Penelope	1966	John Williams	
105	Vol. 7, No. 18	December 2004	Silver Age	2	Bachelor in Paradise	1961	Henry Mancini	
106	Vol. 7, No. 19	January 2005	Golden Age	1	Subterraneans	1960	André Previn	
107	Vol. 7, No. 20	January 2005	Silver Age	1	Kelly's Heroes	1970	Lalo Schifrin	
108	Vol. 8, No. 1	February 2005	Golden Age	1	The Thing from Another World	1951	Dimitri Tiomkin	
108	Vol. 8, No. 1	February 2005	Golden Age	1	Take the High Ground!	1953	Dimitri Tiomkin	
109	Vol. 8, No. 2	March 2005	Silver Age	1	Atlantis, the Lost Continent	1961	Russell Garcia	
109	Vol. 8, No. 2	March 2005	Silver Age	1	The Power	1968	Miklós Rózsa	
110	Vol. 8, No. 3	April 2005	Golden Age	1	Green Mansions	1959	Bronislau Kaper, Heitor Villa-Lobos	
111	Vol. 8, No. 4	April 2005	Silver Age	2	633 Squadron	1964	Ron Goodwin	
111	Vol. 8, No. 4	April 2005	Silver Age	2	Submarine X-1	1969	Ron Goodwin	
112	Vol. 8, No. 5	May 2005	Golden Age	1	Two Weeks in Another Town	1962	David Raksin	
113	Vol. 8, No. 6	May 2005	Silver Age	1	Jericho	1966	Jerry Goldsmith	
113	Vol. 8, No. 6	May 2005	Silver Age	1	The Ghostbreaker	1965	John Williams	
114	Vol. 8, No. 7	May 2005	Golden Age	1	Quentin Durward	1955	Bronislau Kaper	
115	Vol. 8, No. 8	May 2005	Silver Age	1	King Kong	1976	John Barry	yes
116	Vol. 8, No. 9	June 2005	Golden Age	1	The Devil at 4 O'Clock	1961	George Duning	
116	Vol. 8, No. 9	June 2005	Golden Age	1	The Victors	1963	Sol Kaplan	
117	Vol. 8, No. 10	June 2005	Silver Age	1	Knight Rider	1982	Stu Phillips	yes
118	Vol. 8, No. 11	July 2005	Golden Age	1	Lord Jim	1965	Bronislau Kaper	
118	Vol. 8, No. 11	July 2005	Golden Age	1	The Long Ships	1963	Dusan Radic	
119	Vol. 8, No. 12	July 2005	Silver Age	1	The Yakuza	1975	Dave Grusin	yes
120	Vol. 8, No. 13	August 2005	Golden Age	1	The Time Machine	1960	Russell Garcia	
121	Vol. 8, No. 14	August 2005	Silver Age	1	Crossed Swords	1978	Maurice Jarre	
122	Vol. 8, No. 15	September 2005	Golden Age	1	Lili	1953	Bronislau Kaper	
123	Vol. 8, No. 16	September 2005	Silver Age	1	Coma	1978	Jerry Goldsmith	
123	Vol. 8, No. 16	September 2005	Silver Age	1	Westworld	1973	Fred Karlin	
123	Vol. 8, No. 16	September 2005	Silver Age	1	The Carey Treatment	1972	Roy Budd	
124	Vol. 8, No. 17	November 2005	Golden Age	1	Invitation	1952	Bronislau Kaper	
124	Vol. 8, No. 17	November 2005	Golden Age	1	A Life of Her Own	1950	Bronislau Kaper	
125	Vol. 8, No. 18	November 2005	Silver Age	2	The Getaway: The Unused Score	1972	Jerry Fielding	
126	Vol. 8, No. 19	December 2005	Golden Age	2	The Glass Slipper	1955	Bronislau Kaper	yes
127	Vol. 8, No. 20	December 2005	Silver Age	1	Alice in Wonderland	1972	John Barry	
127	Vol. 8, No. 20	December 2005	Silver Age	1	Petulia	1968	John Barry	
128	Vol. 9, No. 1	January 2006	Golden Age	1	Bell, Book and Candle	1958	George Duning	
128	Vol. 9, No. 1	January 2006	Golden Age	1	1001 Arabian Nights	1959	George Duning	
129	Vol. 9, No. 2	January 2006	Silver Age	2	Zig Zag	1970	Oliver Nelson	
129	Vol. 9, No. 2	January 2006	Silver Age	2	The Super Cops	1974	Jerry Fielding	
130	Vol. 9, No. 3	March 2006	Silver Age	1	Not with My Wife, You Don't!	1966	John Williams	
130	Vol. 9, No. 3	March 2006	Silver Age	1	Any Wednesday	1966	George Duning	
131	Vol. 9, No. 4	February 2006	Silver Age	1	Force 10 from Navarone	1978	Ron Goodwin	
132	Vol. 9, No. 5	March 2006	Silver Age	1	The Swimmer	1968	Marvin Hamlisch	yes
133	Vol. 9, No. 6	March 2006	Silver Age	3	Goodbye, Mr. Chips	1969	John Williams & Leslie Bricusse	
134	Vol. 9, No. 7	May 2006	Golden Age	1	The Wrong Man	1956	Bernard Herrmann	
135	Vol. 9, No. 8	May 2006	Silver Age	1	Checkmate	1960	John Williams	yes
135	Vol. 9, No. 8	May 2006	Silver Age	1	Rhythm in Motion	1961	John Williams	yes
136	FSM Box 1	June 2006	Golden Age	12	Helen of Troy	1956	Max Steiner	
136	FSM Box 1	June 2006	Golden Age	12	A Summer Place	1959	Max Steiner	
136	FSM Box 1	June 2006	Golden Age	12	The Miracle	1959	Elmer Bernstein	
136	FSM Box 1	June 2006	Golden Age	12	Toccata for Toy Trains	1957	Elmer Bernstein	
136	FSM Box 1	June 2006	Golden Age	12	To Kill a Mockingbird	1962	Elmer Bernstein	
136	FSM Box 1	June 2006	Golden Age	12	The Silver Chalice	1954	Franz Waxman	
136	FSM Box 1	June 2006	Golden Age	12	The Ghost and Mrs. Muir	1947	Bernard Herrmann	
136	FSM Box 1	June 2006	Golden Age	12	Young Bess	1953	Miklós Rózsa	
136	FSM Box 1	June 2006	Golden Age	12	Wuthering Heights	1939	Alfred Newman	
136	FSM Box 1	June 2006	Golden Age	12	The Thief of Bagdad	1940	Miklós Rózsa	
136	FSM Box 1	June 2006	Golden Age	12	Viva Zapata!	1952	Alex North	
136	FSM Box 1	June 2006	Golden Age	12	Death of a Salesman	1951	Alex North	
136	FSM Box 1	June 2006	Golden Age	12	Torn Curtain	1966	Bernard Herrmann	
136	FSM Box 1	June 2006	Golden Age	12	Madame Bovary	1949	Miklós Rózsa	
136	FSM Box 1	June 2006	Golden Age	12	Land of the Pharaohs	1955	Dimitri Tiomkin	
136	FSM Box 1	June 2006	Golden Age	12	Gunfight at the O.K. Corral	1957	Dimitri Tiomkin	
136	FSM Box 1	June 2006	Golden Age	12	The High and the Mighty	1954	Dimitri Tiomkin	
136	FSM Box 1	June 2006	Golden Age	12	Search for Paradise	1957	Dimitri Tiomkin	
136	FSM Box 1	June 2006	Golden Age	12	Kings of the Sun	1963	Elmer Bernstein	
137	Vol. 9, No. 9	July 2006	Silver Age	1	Diamond Head	1963	John Williams	
137	Vol. 9, No. 9	July 2006	Silver Age	1	Gone with the Wave	1964	Lalo Schifrin	
138	Vol. 9, No. 10	July 2006	Silver Age	1	CHiPs Season 2 1978–79	1978–79	Alan Silvestri & Bruce Broughton & John Carl Parker (original theme)	
139	Vol. 9, No. 11	August 2006	Silver Age	1	7 Faces of Dr. Lao	1964	Leigh Harline	
140	Vol. 9, No. 12	September 2006	Silver Age	1	The Life and Times of Judge Roy Bean	1972	Maurice Jarre	
141	Vol. 9, No. 13	October 2006	Golden Age	1	Random Harvest	1942	Herbert Stothart	
141	Vol. 9, No. 13	October 2006	Golden Age	1	The Yearling	1946	Herbert Stothart	
142	Vol. 9, No. 14	October 2006	Silver Age	1	Guns for San Sebastian	1968	Ennio Morricone	
143	Vol. 9, No. 15	November 2006	Golden Age	1	Dead Ringer	1964	André Previn	
144	Vol. 9, No. 16	November 2006	Silver Age	1	The Liquidator	1966	Lalo Schifrin	
145	Vol. 9, No. 17	December 2006	Golden Age	2	Tom and Jerry and Tex Avery Too!	1952–58	Scott Bradley	
146	Vol. 9, No. 18	December 2006	Silver Age	1	The Spy with My Face: The Man From U.N.C.L.E. Movies	1964–68	Jerry Goldsmith & various	
147	Vol. 9, No. 19	January 2007	Golden Age	2	Raintree County	1957	Johnny Green	
148	Vol. 9, No. 20	January 2007	Silver Age	1	The Last Run	1971	Jerry Goldsmith	
148	Vol. 9, No. 20	January 2007	Silver Age	1	Crosscurrent	1971	Jerry Goldsmith	
148	Vol. 9, No. 20	January 2007	Silver Age	1	The Scorpio Letters	1967	Dave Grusin	
149	Vol. 10, No. 1	March 2007	Golden Age	1	Some Came Running	1958	Elmer Bernstein	
150	Vol. 10, No. 2	March 2007	Silver Age	1	The Wrath of God	1972	Lalo Schifrin	
151	Vol. 10, No. 3	April 2007	Golden Age	1	The Long, Long Trailer	1954	Adolph Deutsch	
151	Vol. 10, No. 3	April 2007	Golden Age	1	Forever, Darling	1956	Bronislau Kaper	
152	Vol. 10, No. 4	April 2007	Silver Age	1	Damn the Defiant!	1962	Clifton Parker	
152	Vol. 10, No. 4	April 2007	Silver Age	1	Behold a Pale Horse	1964	Maurice Jarre	
153	Vol. 10, No. 5	May 2007	Silver Age	1	The Dirty Dozen	1967	Frank DeVol	
154	Vol. 10, No. 6	May 2007	Silver Age	1	The Satan Bug (Archival Edition)	1965	Jerry Goldsmith	
155	Vol. 10, No. 7	June 2007	Silver Age	1	Wait Until Dark	1967	Henry Mancini	
156	FSM-80126-2	June 2007	Retrograde	1	A Man Called Adam	1966	Benny Carter	
157	Vol. 10, No. 8	July 2007	Silver Age	1	The Bridge at Remagen	1969	Elmer Bernstein	
157	Vol. 10, No. 8	July 2007	Silver Age	1	The Train	1964	Maurice Jarre	
158	Vol. 10, No. 9	July 2007	Golden Age	1	Ride, Vaquero!	1953	Bronislau Kaper	
158	Vol. 10, No. 9	July 2007	Golden Age	1	The Outriders	1950	André Previn	
159	Vol. 10, No. 10	September 2007	Golden / Silver	3	The Unforgiven	1960	Dimitri Tiomkin	yes
159	Vol. 10, No. 10	September 2007	Golden / Silver	3	Cast a Long Shadow	1959	Gerald Fried	yes
159	Vol. 10, No. 10	September 2007	Golden / Silver	3	The Horse Soldiers	1959	David Buttolph	yes
159	Vol. 10, No. 10	September 2007	Golden / Silver	3	Invitation to a Gunfighter	1964	David Raksin	yes
159	Vol. 10, No. 10	September 2007	Golden / Silver	3	Guns of the Magnificent Seven	1969	Elmer Bernstein	yes
160	Vol. 10, No. 11	October 2007	Golden Age	2	The Silver Chalice	1954	Franz Waxman	
161	Vol. 10, No. 12	October 2007	Silver Age	1	Hotel	1967	Johnny Keating	
161	Vol. 10, No. 12	October 2007	Silver Age	1	Kaleidoscope	1966	Stanley Myers	
162	Vol. 10, No. 13	November 2007	Silver Age	1	Sex and the Single Girl	1964	Neal Hefti	
162	Vol. 10, No. 13	November 2007	Silver Age	1	The Chapman Report	1962	Leonard Rosenman	
163	Vol. 10, No. 14	November 2007	Silver Age	1	Navajo Joe	1966	Ennio Morricone	
164	Vol. 10, No. 15	December 2007	Golden Age	2	Kings Row	1942	Erich Wolfgang Korngold	
164	Vol. 10, No. 15	December 2007	Golden Age	2	The Sea Wolf	1941	Erich Wolfgang Korngold	
165	Vol. 10, No. 16	December 2007	Silver Age	1	Klute	1971	Michael Small	
165	Vol. 10, No. 16	December 2007	Silver Age	1	All the President's Men	1976	David Shire	
166	Vol. 10, No. 17	January 2008	Golden Age	2	Land of the Pharaohs	1955	Dimitri Tiomkin	
167	Vol. 10, No. 18	January 2008	Silver Age	1	Dark of the Sun	1968	Jacques Loussier	
168	FSM Box 2	February 2008	Silver Age	8	Superman	1978	John Williams	
168	FSM Box 2	February 2008	Silver Age	8	Superman II	1980	Ken Thorne	
168	FSM Box 2	February 2008	Silver Age	8	Superman III	1983	Ken Thorne	
168	FSM Box 2	February 2008	Silver Age	8	Superman IV: The Quest for Peace	1987	Alexander Courage & John Williams	
168	FSM Box 2	February 2008	Silver Age	8	Superman Animated Ruby Spears	1988	Ron Jones	
168	FSM Box 2	February 2008	Silver Age	8	Extra!	1978–87	Various Artists	
169	Vol. 11, No. 1	March 2008	Silver Age	1	Eye of the Devil	1966	Gary McFarland	
170	Vol. 11, No. 2	March 2008	Silver Age	1	Heavy Metal	1981	Elmer Bernstein	
171	Vol. 11, No. 3	May 2008	Golden Age	1	The Wreck of the Mary Deare	1959	George Duning	
171	Vol. 11, No. 3	May 2008	Golden Age	1	Twilight of Honor	1963	John Green	
172	Vol. 11, No. 4	May 2008	Silver Age	1	Under Fire	1983	Jerry Goldsmith	
173	Vol. 11, No. 5	May 2008	Silver Age	1	The Ice Pirates	1984	Bruce Broughton	
174	Vol. 11, No. 6	May 2008	Silver Age	1	The Accidental Tourist	1988	John Williams	
175	Vol. 11, No. 7	July 2008	Golden Age	3	The Naked Spur	1953	Bronislau Kaper	yes
175	Vol. 11, No. 7	July 2008	Golden Age	3	The Wild North	1952	Bronislau Kaper	yes
175	Vol. 11, No. 7	July 2008	Golden Age	3	The Last Hunt	1956	Daniele Amfitheatrof	yes
175	Vol. 11, No. 7	July 2008	Golden Age	3	Devil's Doorway	1950	Daniele Amfitheatrof	yes
175	Vol. 11, No. 7	July 2008	Golden Age	3	Escape from Fort Bravo	1953	Jeff Alexander	yes
176	FSM Box 3	August 2008		12	The MGM Soundtrack Treasury	var.	Various	yes
177	Vol. 11, No. 8	September 2008	Silver Age	3	Shaft Anthology: His Big Score and More	1971–74	Isaac Hayes	
178	Vol. 11, No. 9	October 2008	Silver Age	1	Grand Prix	1966	Maurice Jarre	
179	Vol. 11, No. 10	October 2008	Silver Age	1	CHiPs Vol. 2: Season Three	1979–80	Alan Silvestri	
180	FSM80127	October 2008	Retrograde	1	The Omega Man 2.0 Unlimited (Remastered re-issue of FSMCD Vol. 3 No. 2)	1971	Ron Grainer	
181	Vol. 11, No. 11	December 2008	Golden Age	1	Auntie Mame	1958	Bronislau Kaper	
181	Vol. 11, No. 11	December 2008	Golden Age	1	Rome Adventure	1961	Max Steiner	
182	Vol. 11, No. 12	December 2008	Golden Age	1	John Paul Jones	1959	Max Steiner	
182	Vol. 11, No. 12	December 2008	Golden Age	1	Parrish	1961	Max Steiner	
183	Vol. 12, No. 1	December 2008	Silver Age	1	Maurice Jarre: Concert Works	1951–61	Maurice Jarre	
184	Vol. 12, No. 2	February 2009	Golden Age	5	David Raksin at M-G-M; Includes Across the Wide Missouri (1951); Kind Lady (1951); The Man with a Cloak (1951); The Girl in White (1952); The Magnificent Yankee (1950); The Next Voice You Hear... (cues, 1950); Right Cross (cues, 1950); Grounds for Marriage (cues, 1950); The Vintage (1957); A Lady Without Passport (1950); Until They Sail (1957); Pat and Mike (1952); The Reformer and the Redhead (1950)	1950–57	David Raksin	
185	Vol. 12, No. 3	January 2009	Silver Age	1	Time After Time	1979	Miklós Rózsa	
186	Vol. 12, No. 4	February 2009	Silver Age	3	The Americanization of Emily	1963	Johnny Mandel	
186	Vol. 12, No. 4	February 2009	Silver Age	3	The Sandpiper	1964	Johnny Mandel	
186	Vol. 12, No. 4	February 2009	Silver Age	3	Drums of Africa	1965	Johnny Mandel	
187	Vol. 12, No. 5	April 2009	Golden Age	2	Inside Daisy Clover	1965	André Previn	
188	Vol. 12, No. 6	April 2009	Silver Age	3	Dr. Kildare	1961–66	Morton Stevens, Jerry Goldsmith, Lalo Schifrin & Harry Sukman	
189	Vol. 12, No. 7	April 2009	Silver Age	1	Twilight Zone: The Movie	1983	Jerry Goldsmith	
190	Vol. 12, No. 8	May 2009	Silver Age	1	Captain Nemo and the Underwater City	1969	Angela Morley	yes
191	Vol. 12, No. 9	May 2009	Silver Age	1	The Heart Is a Lonely Hunter	1968	Dave Grusin	
192	Vol. 12, No. 10	May 2009	Silver Age	1	The Thief Who Came to Dinner	1973	Henry Mancini	
193	Vol. 12, No. 11	May 2009	Silver Age	1	Whose Life Is It, Anyway?	1981	Arthur B. Rubinstein	
194	Vol. 12, No. 12	June 2009	Silver Age	1	None but the Brave	1965	John Williams	
195	Vol. 12, No. 13	June 2009	Silver Age	1	The Split	1968	Quincy Jones	
196	Vol. 12, No. 14	July 2009	Silver Age	1	Cain's Hundred	1961	Jerry Goldsmith	
197	FSM-80128-2	July 2009	Retrograde	1	Star Trek II: The Wrath of Khan	1982	James Horner	
198	Vol. 12, No. 15	October 2009	Silver Age	1	Jeremiah Johnson	1972	Tim McIntire & John Rubinstein	
199	Vol. 12, No. 16	October 2009	Silver Age	1	The Five Man Army	1969	Ennio Morricone	
200	FSM Box 4	November 2009	Golden Age	15	Miklós Rózsa Treasury	1949–68	Miklós Rózsa	yes
201	Vol. 12, No. 17	November 2009	Silver Age	1	Bullitt	1968	Lalo Schifrin	
202	Vol. 12, No. 18	December 2009	Golden Age	3	Northwest Passage (Book I – Rogers' Rangers)	1940	Herbert Stothart	
202	Vol. 12, No. 18	December 2009	Golden Age	3	Many Rivers to Cross	1955	Cyril Mockridge	
202	Vol. 12, No. 18	December 2009	Golden Age	3	A Thunder of Drums	1971	Harry Sukman	
202	Vol. 12, No. 18	December 2009	Golden Age	3	The Godchild	1974	David Shire	
203	Vol. 12, No. 19	January 2010	Silver Age	1	Black Sunday	1977	John Williams	
204	Vol. 12, No. 20	January 2010	Silver Age	1	Islands in the Stream	1976	Jerry Goldsmith	
205	Vol. 13, No. 1	January 2010	Silver Age	1	Prophecy	1979	Leonard Rosenman	
206	Vol. 13, No. 2	February 2010	Silver Age	1	Rhino!	1964	Lalo Schifrin	
206	Vol. 13, No. 2	February 2010	Silver Age	1	Once a Thief	1965	Lalo Schifrin	
206	Vol. 13, No. 2	February 2010	Silver Age	1	The Cincinnati Kid	1965	Lalo Schifrin	
206	Vol. 13, No. 2	February 2010	Silver Age	1	The Venetian Affair	1967	Lalo Schifrin	
206	Vol. 13, No. 2	February 2010	Silver Age	1	Sol Madrid	1968	Lalo Schifrin	
206	Vol. 13, No. 2	February 2010	Silver Age	1	Lalo Schifrin at MGM	?	Lalo Schifrin	
207	Vol. 13, No. 3	March 2010	Silver Age	1	White Dog	1982	Ennio Morricone	
208	Vol. 13, No. 4	March 2010	Silver Age	2	The Wonderful World of the Brothers Grimm	1962	Leigh Harline & Bob Merrill	
208	Vol. 13, No. 4	March 2010	Silver Age	2	The Honeymoon Machine	1961	Leigh Harline	
209	Vol. 13, No. 5	April 2010	Silver Age	1	Marathon Man	1976	Michael Small	
209	Vol. 13, No. 5	April 2010	Silver Age	1	The Parallax View	1974	Michael Small	
210	Vol. 13, No. 6	April 2010	Silver Age	2	Cleopatra Jones	1973	J.J. Johnson & Joe Simon	
210	Vol. 13, No. 6	April 2010	Silver Age	2	Cleopatra Jones and the Casino of Gold	1975	Dominic Frontiere	
211	FSM-80129-2	May 2010	Retrograde	2	Star Trek III: The Search for Spock	1984	James Horner	
212	Vol. 13, No. 7	June 2010	Silver Age	1	Tootsie	1982	David Grusin	
213	Vol. 13, No. 8	June 2010	Silver Age	2	Outland	1981	Jerry Goldsmith	
214	Vol. 13, No. 9	July 2010	Golden / Silver	3	The Power and the Prize	1956	Bronislau Kaper	
214	Vol. 13, No. 9	July 2010	Golden / Silver	3	Her Twelve Men	1954	Bronislau Kaper	
214	Vol. 13, No. 9	July 2010	Golden / Silver	3	Somebody Up There Likes Me	1956	Bronislau Kaper	
214	Vol. 13, No. 9	July 2010	Golden / Silver	3	Ada	1961	Bronislau Kaper	
214	Vol. 13, No. 9	July 2010	Golden / Silver	3	Two Loves	1961	Bronislau Kaper	
214	Vol. 13, No. 9	July 2010	Golden / Silver	3	BUtterfield 8	1960	Bronislau Kaper	
215	Vol. 13, No. 10	2010	Golden Age Classics	2	Dragon Seed	1944	Herbert Stothart	
216	Vol. 13, No. 11	August 2010	Silver Age Classics	1	Hunters Are for Killing	1970	Jerry Fielding	
217	Vol. 13, No. 12	August 2010	Silver Age Classics	1	CHiPs, Volume 3, Season 4	1980–81	Alan Silvestri & John Carl Parker (original theme)	
218	Vol. 13, No. 13	August 2010	Silver Age Classics	5	TV Omnibus: Volume One (1962–1976)	1962–76	various composers	
219	FSM Box 5	October 2010	Silver Age Classics	14	Star Trek: The Next Generation	1987–91	Ron Jones (41 of his 42 efforts)	
220	Vol. 13, No. 14	October 2010	Silver Age Classics	1	Hawaii Five-O	1968	Morton Stevens	
221	Vol. 13, No. 15	November 2010	Silver Age	1	Kung-Fu	1973	Jim Helms	
221	Vol. 13, No. 15	November 2010	Silver Age	1	Man in the Wilderness	1971	Johnny Harris	
222	Vol. 13, No. 16	November 2010	Golden Age Classics	3	The 5,000 Fingers of Dr. T.	1953	Frederick Hollander	
223	Vol. 13, No. 17	November 15, 2010	Silver Age Classics	1	North Dallas Forty	1979	John Scott	
224	Vol. 13, No. 18	December 2010	Silver Age Classics	2	Poltergeist	1982	Jerry Goldsmith	
225	Vol. 13, No. 19	December 2010	Silver Age Classics	1	A Man Called Horse	1970	Leonard Rosenman	
226	Vol. 13, No. 20	January 2011	Golden Age Classics	5	Lassie Come Home: The Canine Cinema Collection	1943	Daniele Amfitheatrof	
226	Vol. 13, No. 20	January 2011	Golden Age Classics	5	Son of Lassie	1945	Herbert Stothart	
226	Vol. 13, No. 20	January 2011	Golden Age Classics	5	Courage of Lassie	1946	Bronislau Kaper & Scott Bradley	
226	Vol. 13, No. 20	January 2011	Golden Age Classics	5	The Sun Comes Up	1949	André Previn	
226	Vol. 13, No. 20	January 2011	Golden Age Classics	5	Challenge to Lassie	1949	André Previn	
226	Vol. 13, No. 20	January 2011	Golden Age Classics	5	The Painted Hills	1951	Daniele Amfitheatrof	
226	Vol. 13, No. 20	January 2011	Golden Age Classics	5	It's a Dog's Life	1955	Elmer Bernstein	
227	Vol. 14, No. 1	January 2011	Silver Age Classics	1	The Big Bus	1976	David Shire	
228	Vol. 14, No. 2	February 2011	Silver Age Classics	1	Rich and Famous	1981	Georges Delerue	
228	Vol. 14, No. 2	February 2011	Silver Age Classics	1	One Is a Lonely Number	1972	Michel Legrand	
229	Vol. 14, No. 3	February 2011	Silver Age Classics	1	I Spy, Volume 2 – The LPs	1966–68	Earle Hagen	
230	Vol. 14, No. 4	March 2011	Silver Age Classics	1	Telefon	1977	Lalo Schifrin	
230	Vol. 14, No. 4	March 2011	Silver Age Classics	1	Hide in Plain Sight	1980	Leonard Rosenman	
231	Vol. 14, No. 5	March 2011	Silver Age Classics	1	Robinson Crusoe on Mars	1964	Nathan Van Cleave	
232	Vol. 14, No. 6	March 2011	Silver Age Classics	1	The Homecoming: A Christmas Story	1971	Jerry Goldsmith	
232	Vol. 14, No. 6	March 2011	Silver Age Classics	1	Rascals and Robbers	1982	James Horner	
233	Vol. 14, No. 7	April, 2011	Silver Age Classics	3	Kenner	1967	Piero Piccioni	
233	Vol. 14, No. 7	April, 2011	Silver Age Classics	3	More Than a Miracle	1969	Piero Piccioni	
234	Vol. 14, No. 8	April 2011	Silver Age Classics	1	Testament	1983	James Horner	
235	Vol. 14, No. 9	May 2011	Silver Age Classics	2	The Comedians	1967	Laurence Rosenthal	
235	Vol. 14, No. 9	May 2011	Silver Age Classics	2	Hotel Paradiso	1966	Laurence Rosenthal	
236	Vol. 14, No. 10	May 2011	Golden Age Classics	1	The Belle of New York	1952	Johnny Mercer & Harry Warren	
237	Vol. 14, No. 11	June 2011	Silver Age	1	Pretty Maids All in a Row	1971	Lalo Schifrin	
238	Vol. 14, No. 12	July 2011	Silver Age	2	Days of Heaven	1978	Ennio Morricone	
239	Vol. 14, No. 13	August 2011	Silver Age	1	The Great Santini	1979	Elmer Bernstein	
240	Vol. 14, No. 14	August 2011	Silver Age	1	Not With My Wife, You Don’t! Vol. 2	1979	John Williams	
241	Vol. 14, No. 15	September 2011	Golden Age	1	The Space Children / The Colossus of New York	1958	Nathan Van Cleave	
242	Vol. 14, No. 16	September 2011	Silver Age	1	Nightwatch	1965	John Williams	
242	Vol. 14, No. 16	September 2011	Silver Age	1	Killer by Night	1972	Quincy Jones	
243	FSM80130-2	November 2011	Retrograde	2	Gremlins	1984	Jerry Goldsmith	
244	Vol. 14, No. 17	December 2011	Silver Age	1	Frantic	1988	Ennio Morricone	
245	Vol. 15, No. 1	February 2012	Golden Age	5	Ben-Hur	1959	Miklós Rózsa	
246	Vol. 15, No. 2	March 2012	Silver Age	1	It's Alive	1974	Bernard Herrmann	
247	Vol. 15, No. 3	June 2012	Silver Age	1	The Friends of Eddie Coyle	1973	Dave Grusin	
247	Vol. 15, No. 3	June 2012	Silver Age	1	Three Days of the Condor	1975	Dave Grusin	
248	Vol. 15, No. 4	August 2012	Silver Age	2	Body Heat	1981	John Barry	
249	Vol. 15, No. 5	October 2012	Silver Age	2	King Kong: The Deluxe Edition	1976	John Barry	
250	Vol. 16, No. 1	March 2013	Silver Age	3	The Wild Bunch	1969	Jerry Fielding	

== Awards ==
- 2009 Best Film Music Compilation Album or Box Set – David Raksin at M-G-M – International Film Music Critics Association
- 2005 Film Music Record Label of the Year – International Film Music Critics Association
- 2005 Best CD – The Thing From Another World – Rondo Hatton Classic Horror Awards
- 2004 Best New Release of a Previously Existing Soundtrack – Mutiny on the Bounty – International Film Music Critics Association
- 2004 Soundtrack Label of the Year – International Film Music Critics Association
