= Lassie Come Home =

1943 film by Fred M. Wilcox

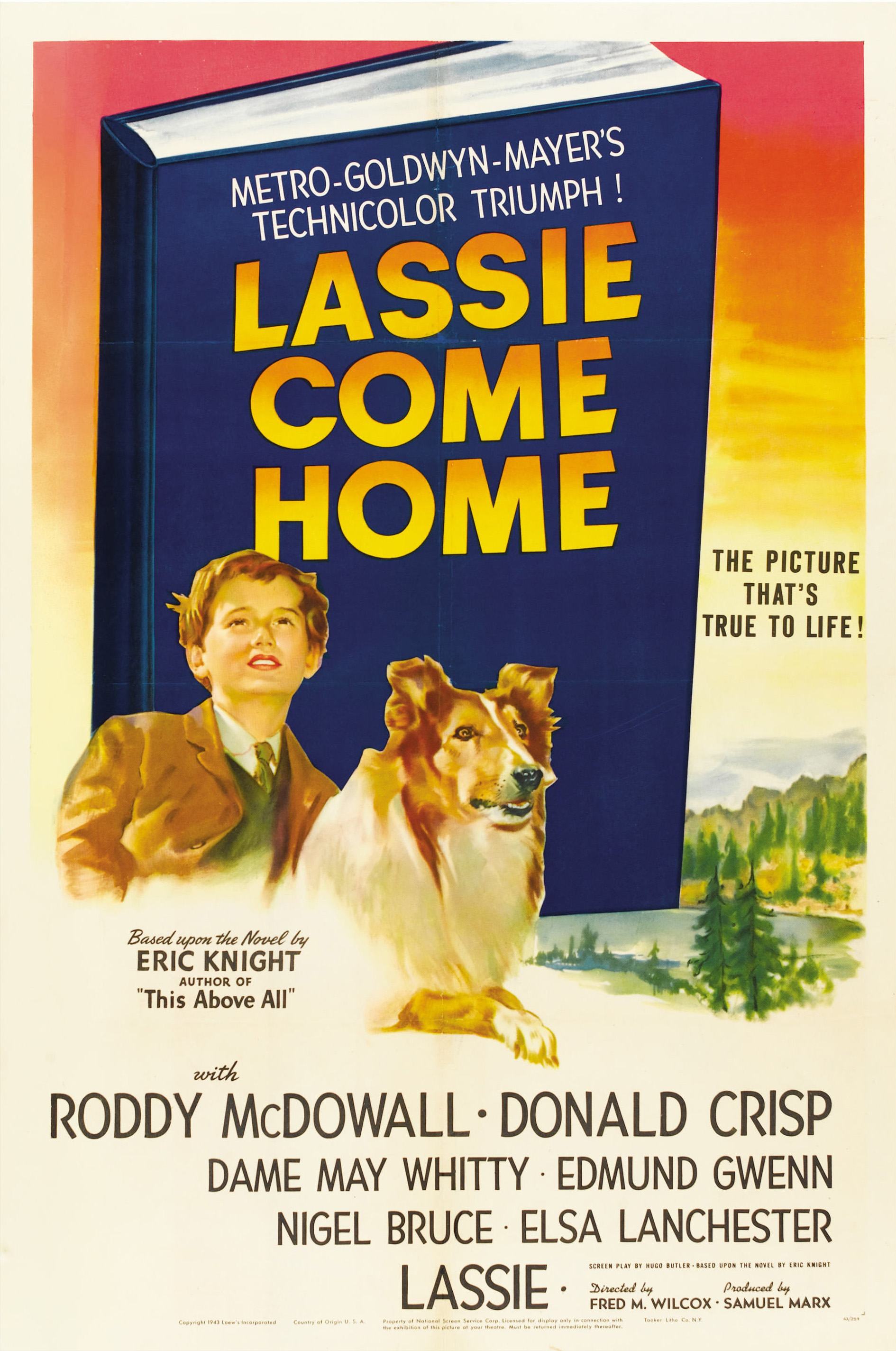
- Theatrical release poster
- Directed by: Fred M. Wilcox
- Screenplay by: Hugo Butler
- Based on: Lassie Come-Home; 1940 novel by Eric Knight
- Produced by: Samuel Marx; Dore Schary
- Starring: Pal (credited as "Lassie"); Roddy McDowall; Donald Crisp; Dame May Whitty; Edmund Gwenn; Nigel Bruce; Elsa Lanchester; Elizabeth Taylor
- Cinematography: Leonard Smith
- Edited by: Ben Lewis
- Music by: Daniele Amfitheatrof
- Distributed by: Metro-Goldwyn-Mayer
- Release date: October 7, 1943
- Running time: 89 minutes
- Country: United States
- Language: English
- Budget: $666,000
- Box office: $4,517,000

Lassie Come Home is a 1943 American, Metro-Goldwyn-Mayer Technicolor drama film starring Roddy McDowall and canine actor Pal, in a story about the profound bond between Yorkshire boy Joe Carraclough and his rough collie, Lassie. The film was directed by Fred M. Wilcox from a screenplay by Hugo Butler based upon the 1940 novel Lassie Come-Home by Eric Knight. The film was the first in a series of seven MGM films starring "Lassie".

In 1993, Lassie Come Home was selected for preservation in the National Film Registry of the Library of Congress being deemed "culturally, historically, or aesthetically significant".

The original film saw a sequel, Son of Lassie in 1945 with five other films following at intervals through the 1940s. A British remake of the 1943 movie was released in 2005 as Lassie to moderate success. The film has been released to VHS and DVD.

== Plot ==
Set in Depression-era Yorkshire, England, Mr and Mrs Carraclough are hit by hard times and forced to sell their collie, Lassie, to the rich Duke of Rudling, who has always admired her. Young Joe Carraclough grows despondent at the loss of his companion.

However, Lassie will have nothing to do with the Duke, and finds ways to escape her kennels and return to Joe. The Duke finally carries Lassie to his home hundreds of miles distant in Scotland. There, his granddaughter Priscilla senses the dog's unhappiness and arranges her escape.

Lassie then sets off for a long trek to her Yorkshire home. She faces many perils along the way, dog catchers and a violent storm, but also meets kind people who offer her aid and comfort. At the end, when Joe has given up hope of ever seeing his dog again, the weary Lassie returns to her favorite resting place in the schoolyard at home. There, Lassie is joyfully reunited with the boy she loves.

== Cast ==
- Roddy McDowall as Joe Carraclough, a Yorkshire schoolboy
- Donald Crisp as Sam Carraclough, Joe's father
- Dame May Whitty as Dally, an elderly woman who aids Lassie on her journey homeward
- Edmund Gwenn as Rowlie, a tinker who befriends Lassie
- Nigel Bruce as Duke of Rudling, grandfather to Priscilla
- Elsa Lanchester as Mrs. Carraclough, Joe's mother
- Pal as Lassie (credited as Lassie)
- Elizabeth Taylor as Priscilla, a young girl sympathetic to Lassie's plight
- Ben Webster as Dan'l Fadden, married to Dally
- J. Patrick O'Malley as Hynes
- Alan Napier as Jock
- Arthur Shields as Andrew
- John Rogers as Snickers
- Alec Craig as Buckles
- George Broughton as Allen (uncredited)

== Production ==
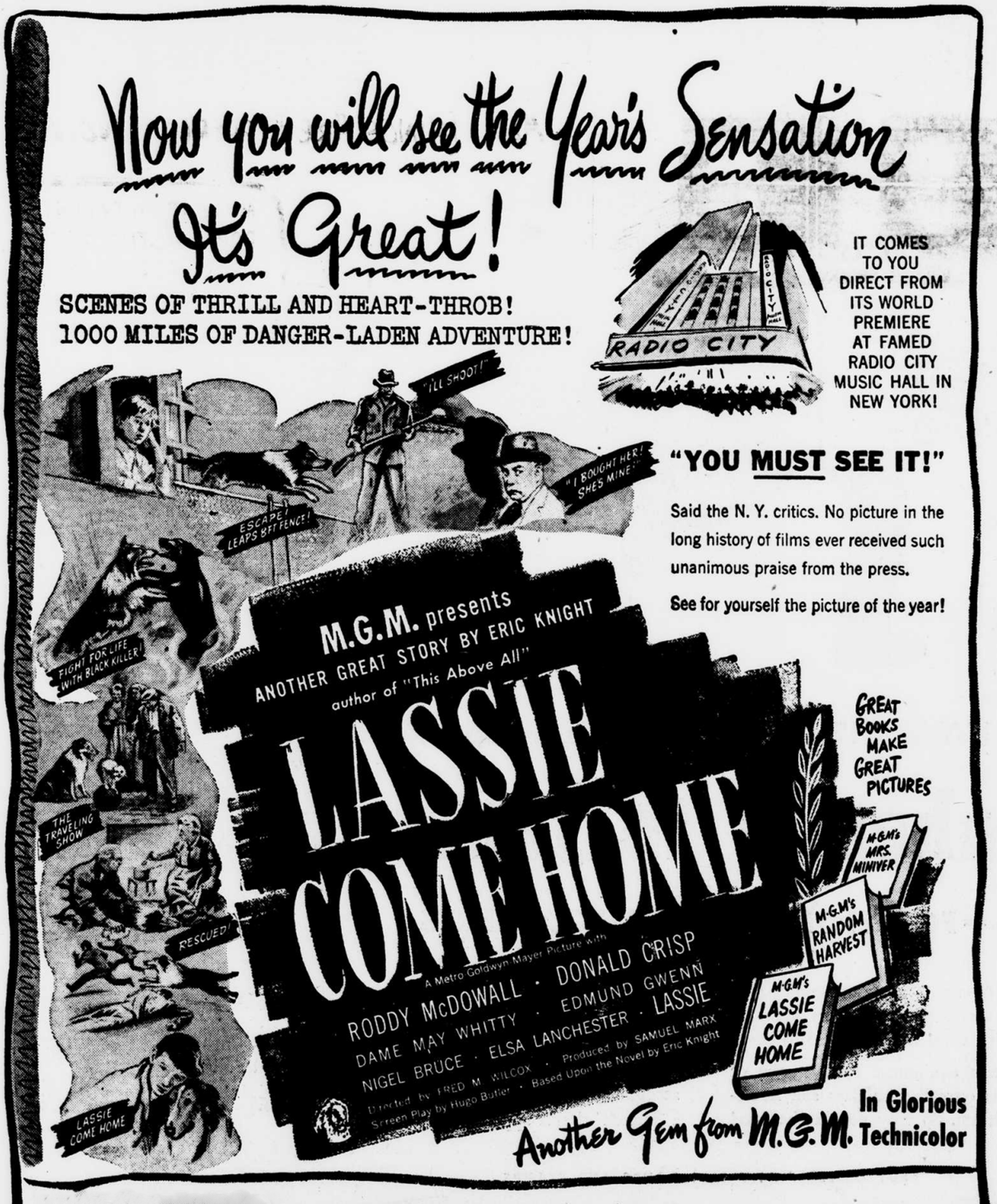
Theatrical advertisement from 1943

The film was shot in Washington state and Monterey, California, while the rapids scene was shot on the San Joaquin River. It also features scenes from the former Janss Conejo Ranch in Wildwood Regional Park in Thousand Oaks, California. Additional photography occurred in Big Bear Lake and Cape Mendocino.

During the film's production, MGM executives previewing the dailies were said to be so moved that they ordered more scenes to be added to "this wonderful motion picture."

Some sources say that, initially, a female collie was selected for the title role, but was replaced when the dog began to shed excessively during shooting of the film in the summer. The trainer, Rudd Weatherwax, then substituted the male collie, Pal, in the role of "Lassie". Pal had been hired to perform the rapids stunt and, being male, looked more impressive in the part. Still other accounts, such as a 1943 New York Times article written while the film was in production, say that Pal was cast by director Fred Wilcox after first being rejected, because no other dog performed satisfactorily with the "near human attributes" he sought for the canine title role. Weatherwax would later receive all rights to the Lassie name and trademark in lieu of back pay owed him by MGM.

== Music ==
In 2010, Film Score Monthly released the complete scores of the seven Lassie feature films released by MGM between 1943 and 1955 as well as Elmer Bernstein’s score for It's a Dog's Life (1955) in the CD collection Lassie Come Home: The Canine Cinema Collection, limited to 1000 copies. Due to the era when these scores were recorded, nearly half of the music masters have been lost so the scores had to be reconstructed and restored from the best available sources, mainly the Music and Effects tracks as well as monaural ¼″ tapes.

The score for Lassie Come Home was composed by Daniele Amfitheatrof.

Track listing for Lassie Come Home (Disc 1)

1. Main Title*/The Story of a Dog* – 2:23
2. Time Sense—Second Version*/Have a Good Time/Waking Up Joe*/Lassie is Sold – 6:30
3. Lassie is Sold, Part 2 – 1:07
4. Joe is Heartbroken*/Priscilla Meets Lassie – 2:40
5. Time Sense—Second Version*/First Escape (beginning)* – 1:33
6. Hynes Arrives/Time Sense—Second Version*/Second Escape – 2:09
7. Day Dreaming – 1:30
8. Bid Her Stay*/Honest is Honest/Lassie Goes to Scotland*/Lassie in Scotland – 4:45
9. Lassie is Chained* – 0:51
10. Hynes Walks Lassie – 0:59
11. Time Sense—Second Version*/Lassie Runs Away*/The Storm/Over the Mountains*/The Lake & Time Sense #3/Lassie vs. Satan*/The Dog Fight (Amfitheatrof–Mario Castelnuovo-Tedesco)*/Lassie vs. Satan, Part 2*/A Surprise for Joe*/Crossing the River* – 13:09
12. Dan and Dally*/Lassie Recovers/Joe Can't Sleep*/Time Sense—Second Version* – 4:40
13. Lassie is Not Happy/Time Sense—Second Version*/Goodbye, Girl*/Meeting Palmer/Lassie Refuses Food*/Lassie Follows Palmer – 6:28
14. Lassie Wants to Go That Way/Lassie is a Lady/Next Morning – 3:11
15. Toots Gives a Performance*/The Dogs Play*/Thousand Kronen (Bronislau Kaper)*/Last Fight*/Toots is Dead/It's Goodbye, Then*/The Dog Catchers*/Out of Work/Lassie Comes Home*/Duke Arrives* & This is No Dog of Mine*/Time Sense—Second Version*/Lassie Finds Joe & End Title* – 23:19

Bonus tracks

1. Dog Fight (Amfitheatrof–Castelnuovo-Tedesco) – 0:44
2. The Accident – 0:44
3. Pump and Chicken House (Lennie Hayton) – 0:49

Bonus track for Lassie Come Home (Disc 4)

1. First Escape (complete)*† – 3:07

*Contains Sound Effects

†Contains Dialogue

Total Time: 81:19

== Reception ==
The movie was a big hit. According to MGM records it earned $2,613,000 in the US and Canada and $1,904,000 overseas, resulting in a profit of $2,249,000.

The film was nominated for an Academy Award for Best Cinematography, Color and later the character of Lassie received a star on the Hollywood Walk of Fame at 6368 Hollywood Blvd. In 1993, Lassie Come Home was selected for preservation in the United States National Film Registry by the Library of Congress as being "culturally, historically, or aesthetically significant".

Bosley Crowther in The New York Times of October 8, 1943 uniformly praised the performers and production, noting that the film "tells the story of a boy and a dog, tells it with such poignance and simple beauty that only the hardest heart can fail to be moved." In The Nation in 1943, critic James Agee wrote, "Lassie Come Home is a dog story which I had hardly expected to enjoy ... I did, though. Those who made it seem to have had a pretty fair sense of the square naivete which most good stories for children have, or affect; they also manipulate some surprisingly acute emotions out of the head dog. Whether from private remembrance or from the show, I got several reverberations of that strangely pure, half-magical tone which certain books ... have for many children."

Almost 50 years after the film's release, Parade discussed its lasting cultural impact, quoting the Saturday Evening Post which said the film launched Pal on "the most spectacular canine career in film history". Lassie Come Home was also cited as a cultural icon in Jane and Michael Stern's 1992 book, Encyclopedia of Pop Culture.

The film is recognized by American Film Institute in these lists:

- 2003: AFI's 100 Years...100 Heroes & Villains:
  - Lassie – #39 Hero

== References to Lassie Come Home in other media ==
- The 1972 Peanuts film Snoopy Come Home is a title reference to Lassie Come Home, and its plot is also similar to the movie's plot.
- Lassie Come Home is the title of the 11th track on Alphaville's 1986 album Afternoons in Utopia.
- "Lasso Come Home", an episode of the Disney Junior series Sheriff Callie's Wild West, also resembles the title.
- The season 2 episode "R2 Come Home" of Star Wars: The Clone Wars, features a very similar plot line to the film.
- Psych 2: Lassie Come Home
- "Nero come home", a 2015 Danger Mouse episode
- Briefly mentioned alongside other movies like Bambi and The Little Mermaid in the film Addams Family Values

== Home media ==
The film was released on VHS by MGM Home Entertainment in 1990. The film was released on DVD by Warner Home Video and Warner Archive Collection from 2004 onwards.

== Remake ==
A German remake was released in 2020
