= Lassie (radio program) =

American radio juvenile adventure series (1947–1950)

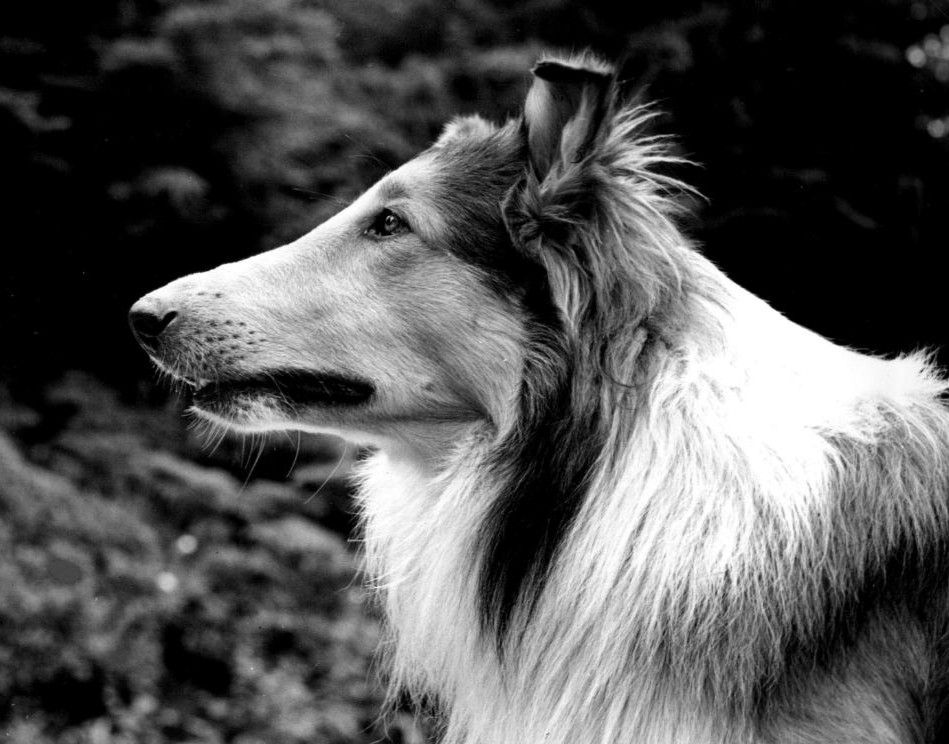
- Pal as Lassie (1942)
- Genre: Juvenile adventure
- Running time: 15 minutes
- Country of origin: United States
- Language: English
- Syndicates: ABC; NBC
- Starring: Pal
- Announcer: Charlie Lyon
- Written by: Harry Stewart
- Directed by: Hobart Donovan
- Produced by: Frank Ferrin
- Narrated by: Rudd Weatherwax
- Original release: June 8, 1947 – May 27, 1950

Lassie is an American old-time radio juvenile adventure program. It was broadcast on ABC from June 8, 1947 until May 30, 1948, and on NBC from June 5, 1948, until May 27, 1950.

== Format ==
Although the program was titled Lassie, the dog's name varied from episode to episode because she wandered from place to place helping both people and animals, and the people the canine encountered used various names. Episodes of the show captured the essence of Eric Knight's book, Lassie Come-Home.

The sponsor was Red Heart Dog Food.

== Personnel ==
Lassie was portrayed by Pal, the male dog that played Lassie in early films about the canine character. Trainer Rudd Weatherwax cued him to whine, bark, and pant at appropriate times. Additional sounds for Lassie and other dogs were provided by Earl Keen, an animal imitator.

Weatherwax narrated the program, and Charlie Lyon was the announcer. John Duffy was the organist. Frank Ferrin, Harry Stewart, and Hobart Donovan were producer, director, and writer, respectively.

== Critical response ==
A review of the initial NBC episode in the trade publication Variety said that the show was "nicely produced ... and scripted okay". The review said that the show "should interest lovers of dogs if the constant hammering for the product can be toned down."
