= Courage of Lassie =

1946 film by Fred M. Wilcox

- Film poster
- Directed by: Fred M. Wilcox
- Written by: Lionel Houser
- Produced by: Robert Sisk
- Starring: Pal (credited as "Lassie"); Elizabeth Taylor; Frank Morgan; Harry Davenport; Selena Royle; Tom Drake; George Cleveland
- Cinematography: Leonard Smith
- Edited by: Conrad A. Nervig
- Music by: Scott Bradley; Bronislau Kaper
- Production company: Metro-Goldwyn-Mayer
- Distributed by: Loew's Inc.
- Release date: November 8, 1946
- Running time: 92 minutes
- Country: United States
- Language: English
- Budget: $1,530,000
- Box office: $4,100,000

Courage of Lassie is a 1946 American Technicolor MGM drama film featuring Elizabeth Taylor, Frank Morgan, and dog actor Pal.

== Plot ==
A young adult collie who is a descendant of Lassie is taken in by Kathie Merrick (Elizabeth Taylor) after being separated from his mother as a pup and growing up in a forest. Merrick names him Bill, and he begins working as a sheepdog under the supervision of the shepherd Mr. MacBain (Frank Morgan). Bill is conscripted as a war dog after being hit by a truck and sent to an animal hospital. He behaves gallantly while at war during the Aleutian Islands Campaign but gains an aggressive temperament after being injured and experiencing hardship. He is returned to the mainland to recuperate, but escapes and continues to behave aggressively. Bill is almost put down, but is reunited with Merrick after it is discovered that he is a war hero.

== Cast ==
- Elizabeth Taylor as Kathie Merrick
- Frank Morgan as Harry MacBain
- Tom Drake as Sergeant Smitty
- Selena Royle as Mrs. Merrick
- Harry Davenport as Judge Payson
- George Cleveland as Old Man
- Catherine Frances McLeod as Alice Merrick
- Morris Ankrum as Farmer Crews
- Mitchell Lewis as Gil Elson
- Jane Green as Mrs. Elson
- David Holt as Pete Merrick
- William Wallace as Sergeant Mac
- Minor Watson as Sheriff Ed Grayson
- Donald Curtis as Charlie
- Clancy Cooper as Casey
- Carl "Alfalfa" Switzer as First Youth
- Conrad Binyon as Second Youth
- Pal as Bill

== Production ==
The film was shot on location at Railroad Creek by Lake Chelan near Holden, Washington.

The film was copyrighted under the working title Hold High the Torch; another working title was Blue Sierra. Margaret O'Brien and Lionel Barrymore were originally slated for the starring roles, according to The Hollywood Reporter. Courage of Lassie was the first top billing of Taylor's career.

== Music ==
In 2010, Film Score Monthly released the complete scores of the seven Lassie feature films released by MGM between 1943 and 1955 as well as Elmer Bernstein's score for It's a Dog's Life (1955) in the CD collection Lassie Come Home: The Canine Cinema Collection, limited to 1000 copies. Due to the era when these scores were recorded, nearly half of the music masters have been lost so the scores had to be reconstructed and restored from the best available sources, mainly the Music and Effects tracks as well as monaural ¼″ tapes.

The score for Courage of Lassie was composed by Bronislau Kaper and Scott Bradley, the latter of which is known for scoring music for MGM's cartoon department.

Track listing for Courage of Lassie (Disc 3)

1. "Main Title" (David Snell, Kaper, Bradley, Robert Franklyn); "The Lake" (Bradley); "Danger in the Woods" (Bradley) - 4:11
2. "The Lost Puppy" (Bradley) - 2:16
3. "The Playful Puppy" (Bradley); "The Eagle" (Bradley); "The Fishing Bear" (Bradley); "Fish Jumps" (Nathaniel Shilkret) - 4:49
4. "Girl on a Raft" (Bradley); "Fawn and the Raven" (Bradley); "The Puppy Gets Shot" (Franklyn–Bradley) - 5:36
5. "Bill Barks" (Kaper); "Hello, Mr. MacBain" (Kaper) - 1:30
6. "Nellie" (Kaper); "My Diary" (Kaper) - 2:33
7. "Sheep in the Snow" (Mario Castelnuovo-Tedesco); "Rescuing the Sheep" (Castelnuovo-Tedesco) - 4:46
8. "It's Bill" (Castelnuovo-Tedesco) - 2:15
9. "At the Veterinary's" (Kaper) - 1:04
10. "Dog Branded" (Kaper) - 1:05
11. "Down, Boy" (Kaper) - 1:09
12. "Ship Kitchen" (Kaper); "The Change" (Castelnuovo-Tedesco) - 5:10

Bonus tracks

1. "Trailer Opening" (Shilkret); "Trailer Finale" (Shilkret) - 1:08
2. "Sunrise" (Castelnuovo-Tedesco); "Dog and Puppies" (Castelnuovo-Tedesco); "The Lost Puppy" (first version) (Castelnuovo-Tedesco); "Dog Meets Animals" (Shilkret); "Woodland Animals" (Shilkret); "Fish Jumps" (first version) (Shilkret); "The Owl and the Coyote" (Castelnuovo-Tedesco) - 16:47
3. "A Girl, a Dog and a Raven" (Castelnuovo-Tedesco) - 3:37

Total Time: 57:83

== Reception ==
The film was popular and earned $2,505,000 in the US and Canada and $1,595,000 elsewhere, making MGM a profit of $968,000.

The New York Times praised the acting of Elizabeth Taylor "refreshingly natural as Lassie's devoted owner, and Frank Morgan, as an elderly confidante," though concluded "it is Lassie's, or Bill's, picture. And, despite some improbabilities in the plot, it is his "acting" and the polychromatic settings which are the chief delights of this offering."
