= Gallant Bess =

1946 film by Andrew Marton

- Theatrical poster
- Directed by: Andrew Marton
- Written by: Arthur Parker, under the pseudonym Marvin Parks (story origination); Jeanne Bartlett (story)
- Produced by: Harry Rapf
- Starring: Marshall Thompson; George Tobias
- Cinematography: John W. Boyle
- Edited by: Harry Komer
- Music by: Rudolph G. Kopp
- Production company: Metro-Goldwyn-Mayer
- Distributed by: Loew's Inc.
- Release date: January 1, 1947
- Running time: 100 minutes
- Country: United States
- Language: English
- Budget: $1,218,000
- Box office: $2,011,000

Gallant Bess is a 1947 American drama film released by Metro-Goldwyn-Mayer. It is loosely based on the true story of U.S. Navy warrant officer Arthur Parker, who rescued an injured filly during World War II. Portions of the film were shot on the coast of Santa Barbara, California in October 1945. This was the first MGM motion picture made in Cinecolor.

== Plot ==
Tex Barton is raising horses when U.S. Navy recruiters come to his town and convince him to enlist. His horse Bess falls ill and dies just before he is sent to the Pacific to fight in World War II. One night, he hears a horse, and the other men think that he is going crazy. He leaves his tent and finds an injured horse that he names Bess. The horse is adopted by the Navy and is trained to help them on the island.

== Background ==
Art Parker was raised on a ranch in Montana in the early 1900s and worked with horses. At the age of 17, he lied to enlist in the U.S. Navy. During World War II, he was stationed in the Solomon Islands and befriended a local rancher. After a Japanese bombing raid, the rancher asked Parker for help rescuing an injured filly. Parker took the horse to the naval base and trained her. She eventually became a morale booster for the sailor, as well as the unit's mascot.

Bess learned tricks, including to run to a sandbagged cave for protection whenever the air-raid siren sounded. She was given the nickname Foxhole Flicka after the horse in the 1941 children's book My Friend Flicka.

When Parker received his orders to return to the U.S., he was denied permission to take Bess with him. Eventually he was allowed to build a stall on a ship for Bess.

== Notes ==
According to Parker family lore, President Franklin D. Roosevelt's wife Eleanor Roosevelt heard of Parker's actions and convinced the president to grant permission to bring Bess home.

After the war, Parker was approached by MGM to film several movies with Bess. Gallant Bess was the first to be filmed and was to be a true account of Bess' rescue, but the first half of the script, up to the point at which Tex joins the Navy, was purely fictional. The rest of the film closely resembled the true account, but still with much artistic license.

The Navy would not allow Parker's name to be credited to the film as he was still on active duty, so the film is fictitiously credited as "Based on a true story as told by Lt. Marvin Park, U.S.N.R." Bess stars as herself, and Parker has a cameo in a scene depicting a violent thunderstorm in which he calms Bess.

Because MGM did not follow the true account as closely as Parker believed that they would, the series of films featuring Bess that had been planned were never filmed. Celebrities such as Judy Garland, Elizabeth Taylor and Charles Lindbergh would occasionally visit Bess.

Bess foaled Gallant Pat in the 1950s and lived the rest of her life with Parker on a ranch in Grass Valley, California. She was euthanized in the late 1960s after a brain tumor was diagnosed. She still bore the scars from her World War II injuries.

The rights to Gallant Bess are now owned by Warner Bros., and the film is occasionally shown on the Turner Classic Movies channel.

Producer Harry Rapf's son Matthew produced Adventures of Gallant Bess for Eagle-Lion Films, but the film did not star the original Bess and is unrelated to Gallant Bess.

== Reception ==
The film earned $1,487,000 in the U.S. and Canada and $524,000 elsewhere, resulting in a loss of $196,000.

== See also ==
- List of films about horses
