= Corri =

Corri is a given name and surname. Notable people with the name include:

== Given name ==
- Corri English (born 1978), American actress and singer
- Corri Wilson (born 1965), Scottish politician

== Surname ==
- Adrienne Corri (1931–2016), Scottish-born actress
- Charles Corri (c. 1862–1941), English musician, conductor, and arranger
- Domenico Corri (1744–1826), Italian composer who migrated to England
- Eugene Corri (c. 1857−1933), British boxing referee
- Fanny Corri-Paltoni (1801–1861), British operatic soprano
- Tina Corri (1864-1930), Irish singer
