= Val Stanton =

English actor and athlete (1886–1967)

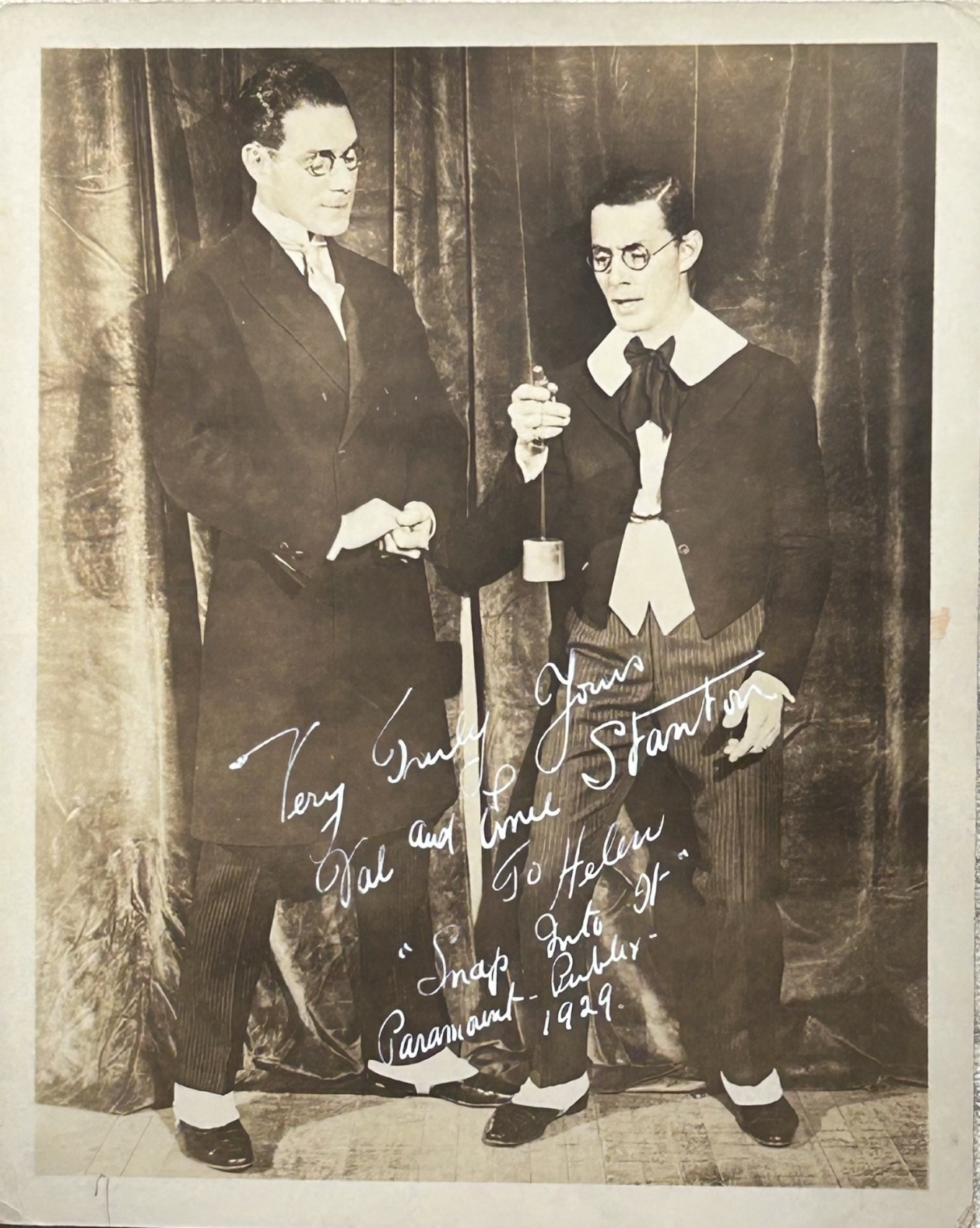
- Val and Ernie Stanton
- Born: Valentine Walter Burch; October 17, 1886; England, UK
- Died: January 25, 1967 (aged 80); Uniondale, New York, US
- Occupations: actor and athlete
- Years active: 1891-1945
- Spouses: Jennie McDade (m. 1909; died 1920) Frances Cowan (m. 1921; died 1933) Marie Harrington (m. 1934, divorced)
- Children: 3
- Parents: Walter Stanton; Tina Corri
- Relatives: Ernie Stanton (brother)

Valentine Walter Burch (October 17, 1886 – January 25, 1967) known professionally as Val Stanton was an English actor and athlete. He was also a vaudeville performer, Known from the team, Val & Ernie Stanton. T.V. host Steve Allen, whose birth name was Stephen Valentine Allen, was named after Val. He was also known as the original stunt model for Jiminy Cricket in Walt Disney’s Pinocchio.

== Early life ==
Valentine Walter Burch was born on October 17, 1886, in England to Walter Stanton and Annie Burch. He came from a theatrical family, as his parents were both in the stage business and both of their parental and maternal relatives as well. Val started his career at the young age of 5. His father tutored him and his brother Ernie Stanton very religiously in the performing arts. Not only were Val and Ernie his students, he also tutored Charlie Chaplin. In England, his father also wrote a sketch for Val called "The Page" which was an act he would perform with his parents. Val also learned his stage business from George Augustus Conquest at the old Royal Grecian Theatre in London. He made his first appearance on the stage at the Theatre Royal, Drury Lane in 1895. He and his family sailed across the sea and immigrated in Chicago in 1898 and settled there for about 2 years until moving and settling in New York City. One of his first acts was a duet with his mother called "Tina and Val Corri" which they continued after immigrating

== Sports career ==
Val was a great athlete who mainly played baseball and golf. He was a terrific hitter. In his first game in Philadelphia, he hit for an average of 1.000 in 5 times at the bat. In 1922 he founded, along with his brother, the National Vaudeville Artists Baseball Club or N.V.A. Ernie served as the manager and pitcher for the team, while Val was the team photographer and would occasionally sub in for the team if needed. Baseball legends like Babe Ruth and Waite Hoyt were also members of the N.V.A and friends of Stanton.

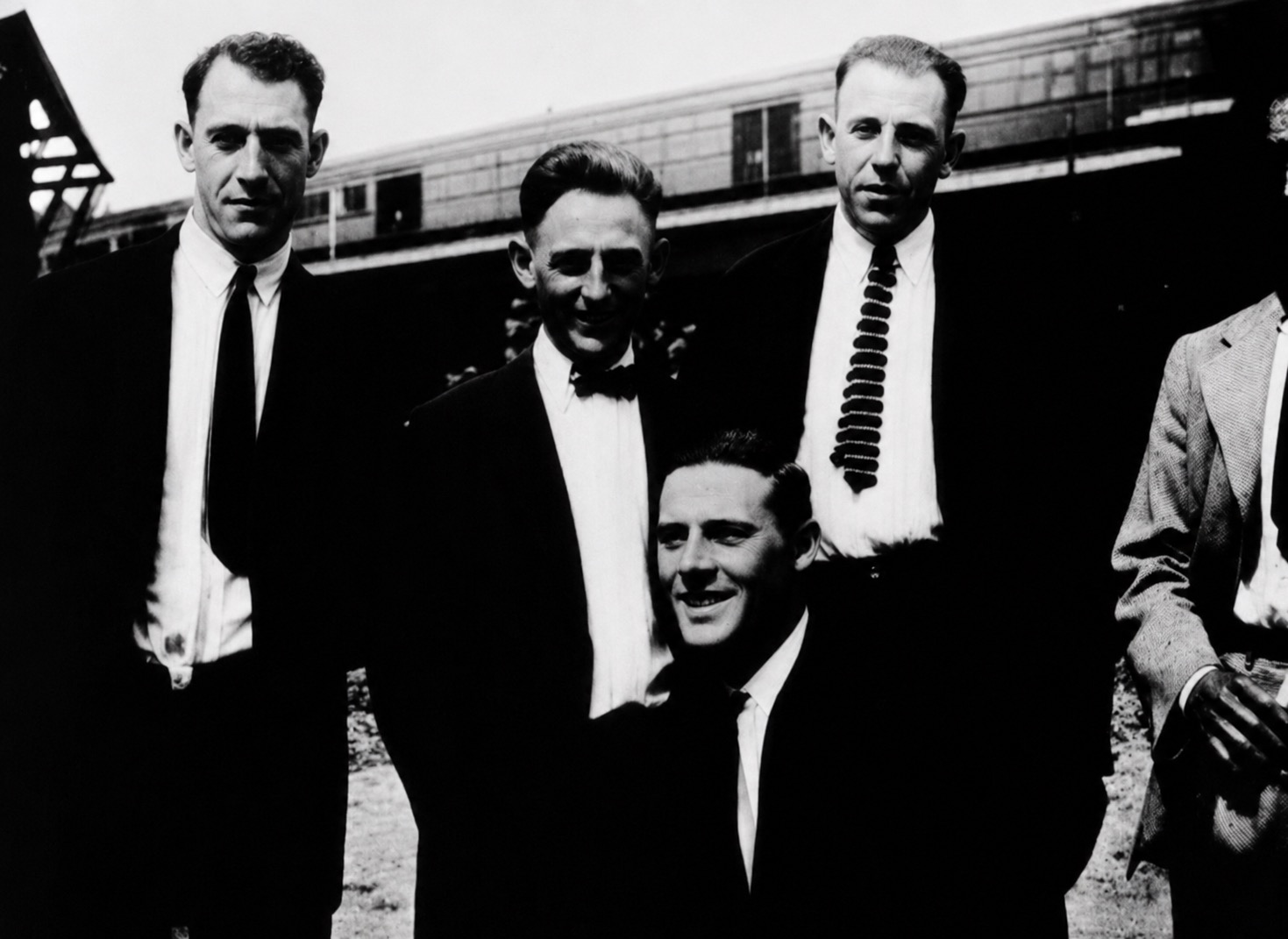
White Sox and N.V.A's. L to R: Roy Wilkinson, Dickey Kerr, Reb Russell, and Dudley "Dud" Farnsworth. Kneeling is Val Stanton

== Vaudeville and acting career ==
Val, with is brother, Ernie Stanton teamed up for their vaudeville careers. They made their first vaudeville appearance together in 1909 in a typical English music hall sketch of a red nose variety, which was written by Val called "Who Stole the Shoes?" They both received offers to do productions alone but they both refused. They described themselves as "The Men Who Laugh and Make the World Laugh With Them" They were also known as "The English Boys from America". The Stanton brothers were vaudeville-circuit comedians.

Val and Ernie in English as She is Not Spoken (left) and Cut Yourself a Piece of Cake (right)

In 1925 they recorded an eight-minute short in London which was an early Vitaphone project. In 1928 they performed in the Vitaphone Varieties films produced by Warner Bros. The two shorts were English as She is Not Spoken and Cut Yourself a Piece of Cake. In their act, Ernie played the harmonica, and Val played the ukulele. They were photographed together. They were described as being "Undoubtedly one of the best comedy talking acts in vaudeville."

Val performed in many films but was known for his acting in Duke of the Navy (1942), Stage Struck (1936), Prison Train (1938). He was even the stunt model for Jiminy Cricket in Walt Disney's original Pinocchio (1940) but was uncredited. He worked alongside many famous legends including Dick Powell, Joan Blondell, Frank Morgan, Errol Flynn, Fred Keating, Ralph Byrd, Ralph Bellamy, Walt Disney and many more.

== Personal life ==
After moving to New York he eventually married a woman named Jennie McDade on April 24, 1909, in Brooklyn, New York. They had 3 daughters during their marriage, Doris in 1914, Marjorie in 1915 and Virginia in 1918. Jennie died in 1920 due to influenza at the age of 29. In 1921 his daughter Virginia, just 3 years old, who went by the nickname "Mickey Stanton" as a toddler had her name in the papers for making the former U.S. president, Woodrow Wilson laugh by her pulling up her skirt and showing the president her bloomers. That ended up being the last time President Wilson was seen in public.

Val moved to Los Angeles in late 1920s and remarried to a woman named Frances, who went by the nickname "Eva". However, she died three years later on August 23, 1933. He then married a third wife, Marie Harrington the following year. Val's father Walter, lived with him in the late 1930s until his death in 1943. In 1944, his brother Ernie passed away unexpectedly in a restaurant about an hour before they were supposed to perform an act. Val accompanied him in the ambulance where he was soon pronounced dead. That same night, Val still did the act without his brother and made the entire sold-out audience laugh. According to the article, it stated "Among the hundreds of spectators who filled the theater to capacity, none of them knew the burden resting on Val's shoulders". He then fainted after the show; He was heartbroken. Val lived in his Los Angeles home until approximately 1948. He returned to New York and lived in Oyster Bay, New York His daughter Marjorie Greto died in 1952; and followed by his other daughter, Virginia Ritz in 1966. It is unclear if Val ever found out about his daughter's deaths before reports of his own death on January 25, 1967, at the age of 80 in Uniondale, New York.

== Family ==
Besides himself and his brother, his father Walter Stanton was a well-known rooster chanticleer impersonator nicknamed "The Giant Rooster" and his mother, Annie nicknamed "Tina Corri", was a male impersonator because her voice was so deep. She was also a member of the Corri family of opera singers from Dublin and for many years a member of the Tony Pastor Company.

His great-grandfather Haydn Corri was a famed organist in Dublin and his father Domenico Corri a well-known Italian composer. One of his cousins, Eugene Corri, was a famous boxing referee in London.

Jennie, his first wife, was not in the stage business but most of her family was. Her sister, Rose McDade Plimmer who was famously known as "Rose Linden" was an actress who was very known on the stage.

Rose's husband, Walter Plimmer Sr. was a theatrical producer and operated his own theatrical agency. Their son, Walter Plimmer Jr., appeared in the film Isn't Life Wonderful (1924). He then eventually became a priest.

== Filmography ==
- The Perfect Gentleman (film) (1935) as Workman in Pub (uncredited)
- Stage Struck (1936 film) (1936) as Cooper
- Hats Off (1936 film) (1936) as Valet
- The Adventures of Robin Hood (1938) as Outlaw (uncredited)
- Mysterious Mr. Moto (1938) as Organ Grinder (uncredited)
- Prison Train (1938) as Sullen
- Pinocchio (1940 film) (1940) as Jiminy Cricket model (uncredited)
- The Great Dictator (1940) as Professor Herr Kibitzen (uncredited)
- The Reluctant Dragon (1941 film) (1941) as Courier (uncredited
- Duke of the Navy (1942) as Sniffy
- This Above All (film) (1942) as policeman (uncredited)
- The Great Impersonation (1942 film) as English Porter (uncredited)
- Hangover Square (film) (1945) as Postman (uncredited)

== Discography ==
- English as She is Not Spoken (1928)
- Cut Yourself a Piece of Cake (1928)
