= Walter Plimmer =

Walter Plimmer may refer to:

- Walter Plimmer Sr. (1869–1944), English theatrical producer, owner, and agent
- Walter Plimmer Jr. (1900–1968), his son, American vaudeville actor, performer, and priest
