= Peter Machajdík =

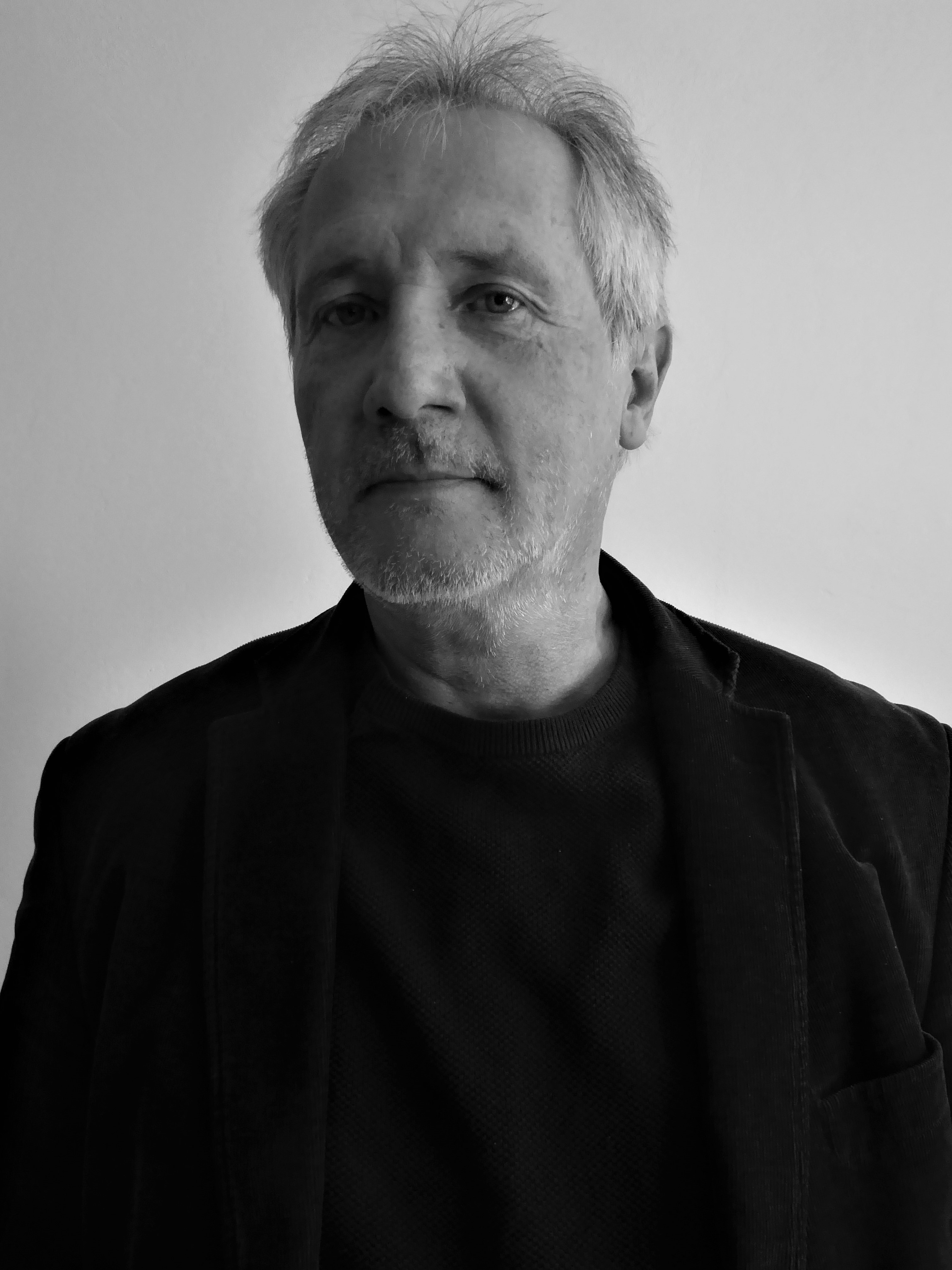

Background information
- Born: Peter Machajdik; 1 June 1961 (age 65); Bratislava, Rača (Bratislava), Czechoslovakia
- Genres: Classical, Postminimal music, Contemporary classical music, Film music
- Occupation: Composer
- Instrument: Keyboards
- Years active: 1988–present
- Labels: Decca Records, Azyl Music, Musica slovaca, Albany Records, Amadeus Arte, Pavlik Records, Czech Radio
- Website: www.machajdik.com

Peter Machajdík ['maxajɟik] (born 1 June 1961) is a Slovak composer of classical music, performer and sound artist. He was born and grew up in Bratislava, Slovakia. He left Bratislava in the early 1990s and settled in Kreuzberg, Berlin.

He has received critical acclaim for his chamber, orchestral, electronic, choral, and theatre works.

In the 1990s, he took part in seminars with Vinko Globokar, Karlheinz Stockhausen, Clarence Barlow, Konrad Boehmer, and others. In 1992, he was the guest of the DAAD Artists-in-Berlin Program.

Machajdik has composed music in nearly all genres, including orchestra, band, chorus, chamber music, works for solo instrument, works for piano and organ, as well as liturgical works and hymns.

Moreover, he has created a number of graphic notations, including the Dialogue with... series which is based on letters received from composer colleagues with additional visual elements added. While in this series the written content of the letters may appear as audible text, other graphic notations are purely visual (like Wold). Others again contain notation or text describing elements to be performed (like Donauklang).

His music is published primarily by Musica Slovaca, Alea Publishing, Zimbel Press, and Edition Hudba.

Peter Machajdík's music often asks questions about the society in which we live. It calls for humanity and responsibility that human beings should have to each other and to the world. Machajdík's works, often considered as the counterpoint to the violence, intolerance, racism and greed of our age, are marked by a keen sensitivity to instrumental colour and texture.

Machajdik's orchestral works have been premiered by the Janáček Philharmonic Orchestra, State Philharmonic Orchestra of Košice, Nordwestdeutsche Philharmonie, Pomeranian Philharmonic, Lugansk Symphony Orchestra, Slovak Radio Symphony Orchestra, Slovak Chamber Orchestra, Camerata Europea, Capella Istropolitana, Ensemble Metamorphosis, Cluster Ensemble, and many others. He has also worked with Jon Anderson from Yes, harpist Floraleda Sacchi, cimbalom virtuoso Enikö Ginzery, vocalist & drummer David Moss, conductors Benjamin Bayl, Anu Tali, Miran Vaupotić, Florian Ludwig, Pawel Przytocki, Gum Nanse, Przemysław Zych, clarinetists Martin Adámek and Guido Arbonelli, and violist Sasha Mirković.

Film credits include Machajdik's scores for 4 Schüler gegen Stalin (2005), Wild Slovakia (2015) and Miloš and the Lynxes (2010). Machajdik has worked with choreographers and dancers such as Dorothea Rust, Studio tanca, Petra Fornayova, Tina Mantel, Lucia Kašiarová, and others.

A vegetarian and teetotaler, Machajdík lives in Berlin, Germany, and in a little Slovak town situated in a valley, surrounded by lofty hills. He is currently Visiting Professor at the Faculty of Arts in Košice.

== Selected works ==
- Apocalyptic Images of Hope for guitar and small orchestra (fl, ob, cl, bsn, hn, tbn - woodblock - strings), c. 12 minutes (2026)
- Broad Peak for string orchestra, c. 7 minutes (2026)
- Meanders of Dignity for organ and string orchestra, c. 18 minutes (2025)
- Beyond the Abyss for string quartet, c. 10 minutes (2024)
- Arching Sentiments for brass quintet, c. 10 minutes (2024)
- The Day After Which Mankind Became Wiser for orchestra (2 fl+afl, 2 ob, E.H. (dbl. ob), 2 clar (Bb)+Bass Clar, 2 bsns, cbsn — 4,1,2,1 — timp — perc. (3) — hrp — pno, celesta — strings), c. 20 minutes (2024)
- Blurred Lights for organ (2024)
- They observed, but did not evaluate for clarinet in B♭, violoncello and accordion (2024) c. 12 minutes
- If for solo trumpet (2024) c. 5 minutes
- Mothers for viola and string orchestra (2023), Meta World Contemporary Art Festival, Belgrade, 13 December 2023, Saša Mirković (vla), Ensemble Metamorphosis
- This was blue for string quartet, c. 12 minutes (2024)
- Da superbia for organ (2021)
- Natural Harbors for violin, viola, cello, double bass and piano (2022) 15 minutes
- Out of the Darkness for guitar quartet, c. 10 minutes (2022)
- The Lost Blue - Still Connecting for flute, percussion (vib, crotales) and piano, 14 minutes (2022)
- Quiet Differences for two guitars, c. 7 minutes (2022)
- Kryha for two accordions (2021)
- Planting for cimbalom (2021)
- Da perenne gaudium for organ (2021)
- Lavender Fields for flute, viola and harp (2020) 10 minutes
- On Temperance for piano (2020)
- The Vanishing for 2 accordions and organ (2020) 12 minutes
- Sinaia Echoes for flute, percussion (vib, gong) and piano (2020) 15 minutes
- More Questions Than Answers for guitar (2020) 8 minutes
- Invisible Beings for string orchestra (2019)
- In der Essenz for flute, percussion (vib, trgl) and piano (2019) 5 minutes
- Howling Glaciers for piano and accordion (2019)
- Gegen.Stand for accordion and orchestra (2019) 20 minutes
- Sacrifices for piano (2019)
- Déjà vu (Concertino for harpsichord and string orchestra) [1999, rev. 2019]
- Mornings for piano (2019)
- Terauchi for string quartet and audio-playback (2018) 10 minutes
- Ave verum for soprano, violin and organ (2018), Organ Plus Festival in Ružomberok, 25 June 2023, Miriam Žiarna, soprano, Rastislav Adamko, violin, Zuzana Zahradníková, organ
- Ave verum for soprano, violin and piano (2018), Filharmonia Częstochowska, Częstochowa, 20 March 2024, Miriam Žiarna, soprano, Rastislav Adamko, violin, Zuzana Zahradníková, piano
- It's Not the Mist for two pianos (2018)
- Zem for organ (2018)
- 1-9-1-8 for violin and piano (2018)
- Signes de la mémoire for clarinet, violin, cello and piano (2017) approx. 8 minutes
- Wold [open instrumentation and duration assumed] (2017)
- Folium for piano and organ (2017) 10 minutes
- Guitar quintet The Son, for guitar and string quartet (2017) approx. 10 minutes
- In Embrace for double bass and piano (2017) approx. 11 minutes
- Mit den Augen eines Falken for mandolin and guitar (2017) approx. 11 minutes
- Behind the Waves for viola and string orchestra (2016) approx. 12 minutes
- Portus pacis for organ (2016) 9 minutes
- Abandoned Gates for piano and string quartet (2016) 13 minutes
- Seas and Deserts for string quartet and audio-playback (2015) 12 minutes
- Ich war in dir for soprano and cello (2015)
- Danube Afterpoint for piccolo, flute, clarinet, bass clarinet, two pianos and string quartet (2015) 15 minutes
- Effugium for accordion and audio-playback (2015) 8 minutes
- Senahh for flute and piano (2015)
- Green for accordion (2015)
- Spomaleniny for violin and piano (2014)
- Munk for viola and piano (2013)
- Silent Wanderings for guitar (2012) 5 minutes
- Wie der Wind in den Dünen for string orchestra (2011)
- The Immanent Velvet for piano (2011)
- Kyrie for mixed choir a cappella (SATB) (2011)
- Pictures of a Changing Sensibility for violin and piano (2011)
- Linnas for piano (2011)
- Domine for mixed choir (SATB) and tubular bells (2011)
- Flower full of Gardens for harp or harpsichord (2010)
- San José for large orchestra (2010)
- Zem zeme for clarinet quartet (2009)
- Water Forgives for cimbalom (2009)
- Concerto for 2 bayans and orchestra, dedicated to all of those who helped to remove „the iron curtain“ and the communistic regimes in the central part of Europe in the 1989 (2008)
- On the Seven Colours of Light for organ (2007)
- Iese for flute solo (2007) approx. 5 minutes
- To the Rainbow So Close Again for string quartet (2004)
- Nell'autunno del suo abbraccio insonne for harp (2004)
- Obscured Temptations for piano (2003)
- Si diligamus invicem for mixed choir a cappella (SATB) (2002)
- Namah for string orchestra (2000)
- Lasea for string orchestra (2000)
- Kirin for oboe solo (1999/2001)
- Five Mirrors for accordion (1997)
- Wrieskalotkipaoxq for saxophone quartet (1996)
- Intime Musik [open instrumentation and duration assumed] (1994)

== Music for theatre ==
- Escaped Alone [music for the production of Caryl Churchill's play Escaped Alone under Eduard Kudláč's direction at the Slovak National Theatre] (2021)
- Niekto príde" (Nokon kjem til å komme) [music for the production of Jon Fosse's play Nokon kjem til å komme under Eduard Kudláč's direction at the Žilina Theatre] (2021)
- Bezzubata [music for the production of Miklos Forgacs's play Bezzubata under Eduard Kudláč's direction at the Žilina Theatre] (2019)

== Sound Art and Graphic Notation ==
- Donauklang [open instrumentation and duration assumed] (1989)
- Dialogue with Stockhausen [open instrumentation and duration assumed] [1984]
- Dialogue with Malcom Goldstein [open instrumentation and duration assumed] [1984]

== Discography ==
- 1995: THE ReR QUARTERLY © QUARTERLY, ReR Volume 4 No 1 CD - ReR 0401 Recommended Records
- 2003: NAMASTE SUITE (Guido Arbonelli - clarinets) © Mnemes HCD 102
- 2008: NUOVE MUSICE PER TROMBA 6 (Ivano Ascari - trumpet) © AZ 5005
- 2008: THE HEALING HEATING (R(A)DIO(CUSTICA) SELECTED 2008) © Czech Radio
- 2008: NAMAH feat. Floraleda Sacchi, Jon Anderson, David Moss © musica slovaca SF 00542131
- 2009: MINIMAL HARP (Floraleda Sacchi - harp). Works by Arvo Pärt, John Cage, Philip Glass, György Ligeti, Peter Machajdík, Lou Harrison, Nicola Campogrande) © DECCA / Universal 476 317
- 2011: INSIDE THE TREE (Machajdík's music for cello, harp and electronics) © Amadeus Arte Catalogue No. AA11003
- 2012: CZECHOSLOVAK CHAMBER DUO (Dvořák / Machajdík / Schneider-Trnavský) Czech Radio, Catalogue No. #CR0591-2
- 2012: A MARVELOUS LOVE - New Music for Organ (Carson Cooman plays compositions by Peter Machajdík, Patricia Van Ness, Jim Dalton, Tim Rozema, Al Benner, Thomas Åberg, and Harold Stover), Albany Records, Catalogue No. TROY1357
- 2012: THE IMMANENT VELVET (Machajdík's chamber music for piano, guitar, cello, harp and strings), Azyl Records, Catalogue No. R266-0024-2-331
- 2015: ELEKTRICKÁ GITARA (Machajdík's 12-minute composition LET for electric guitar, and works by composers such as Luciano Berio, Daniel Matej, Boško Milaković, Juraj Vajó, Pavol Bizoň, Ivan Buffa), Hevhetia, Catalogue No. HV 0070-2-331
- 2018: FRIENDS IN COMMON TIME (Works by Peter Machajdík, Tor Brevik, Francis Kayali, Adrienne Albert, Peter Kutt, Andre Caplet, Kevin W. Walker, Alexander Timofeev) Catalogue No. © Copyright - Rebecca Jeffreys (700261465210)
- 2018: BIRDS (Finnish harpsichordist Elina Mustonen plays works by Peter Machajdík, François Couperin, Jean-Philippe Rameau, William Byrd, Olli Mustonen) © Fuga 9447, EAN: 6419369094478
- 2019: BOWEN-REGER-MACHAJDIK-BRAHMS (Ivan Palovič - viola and Jordana Palovičová - piano). Works by Peter Machajdík, Johannes Brahms, Max Reger a Yorka Bowen) © Pavlík Records
- 2022: MACHAJDÍK, RUNCHAK, ZYCH, STIVRINA • ACCOSPHERE NEW ACCORDION CHAMBER MUSIC • PALUS, BUDZIŇÁKOVÁ (Duo Accosphere, Airis String Quartet). Works by Peter Machajdík, Grzegorz Majka, Volodymyr Runchak, Renate Stivrina, Tyler Versluis and Wojciech Ziemowit Zych © DUX Records
- 2022: Proxima Piano Trio - Current Vibes (Proxima Piano Trio). Piano trios by Peter Machajdík, Peter Groll, Matej Sloboda and Konštantin Ilievsky © UBU Collection 2022

On the 2008 CD NAMAH, Machajdík worked with singer Jon Anderson from Yes, harpist Floraleda Sacchi, vocalist & drummer David Moss, clarinet virtuoso Guido Arbonelli, cello player Jozef Lupták, and others.

== Bibliography ==
- Dinescu / Heinemannr: Goldberg! Variationen zu Bach, Verlag Dohr Köln (2022) - ISBN 978-3-86846-171-8
- Torsten Möller, Kunsu Shim, Gerhard Stäbler: SoundVisions (2005) - ISBN 3-89727-272-5
- Zuzana Martináková: Slovak Composers after 1900 (2002) - ISBN 80-89078-02-8
- Július Fujak: Musical Correla(c)tivity (2005) - ISBN 80-8050-870-4
- Michal Murin: Avalanches 1990-95 (2002) - ISBN 80-967206-4-3
- Marián Jurík, Peter Zagar: 100 slovenských skladateľov (1998) - ISBN 80-967799-6-6
- Slovenská hudba Slovenská hudba včera a dnes (1997) - ISSN 1335-2458
- Július Fujak & kol. Slovenské hudobné alternatívy (2006) - ISBN 80-8050-944-1
