= Jeff Moss (disambiguation) =

Jeff Moss (1942–1998) was creator of the Sesame Street television program.

Jeff Moss may also refer to:

- Jeff Moss (cricketer) (born 1947), Australian cricketer
- Jeff Moss (hacker) (born 1975), founder of the DEF CON and Black Hat technology conferences

== See also ==
- Geoffrey Moss (1885–1954), British soldier
