= Ernie Stanton =

English actor and athlete

Ernest George Stanton Burch
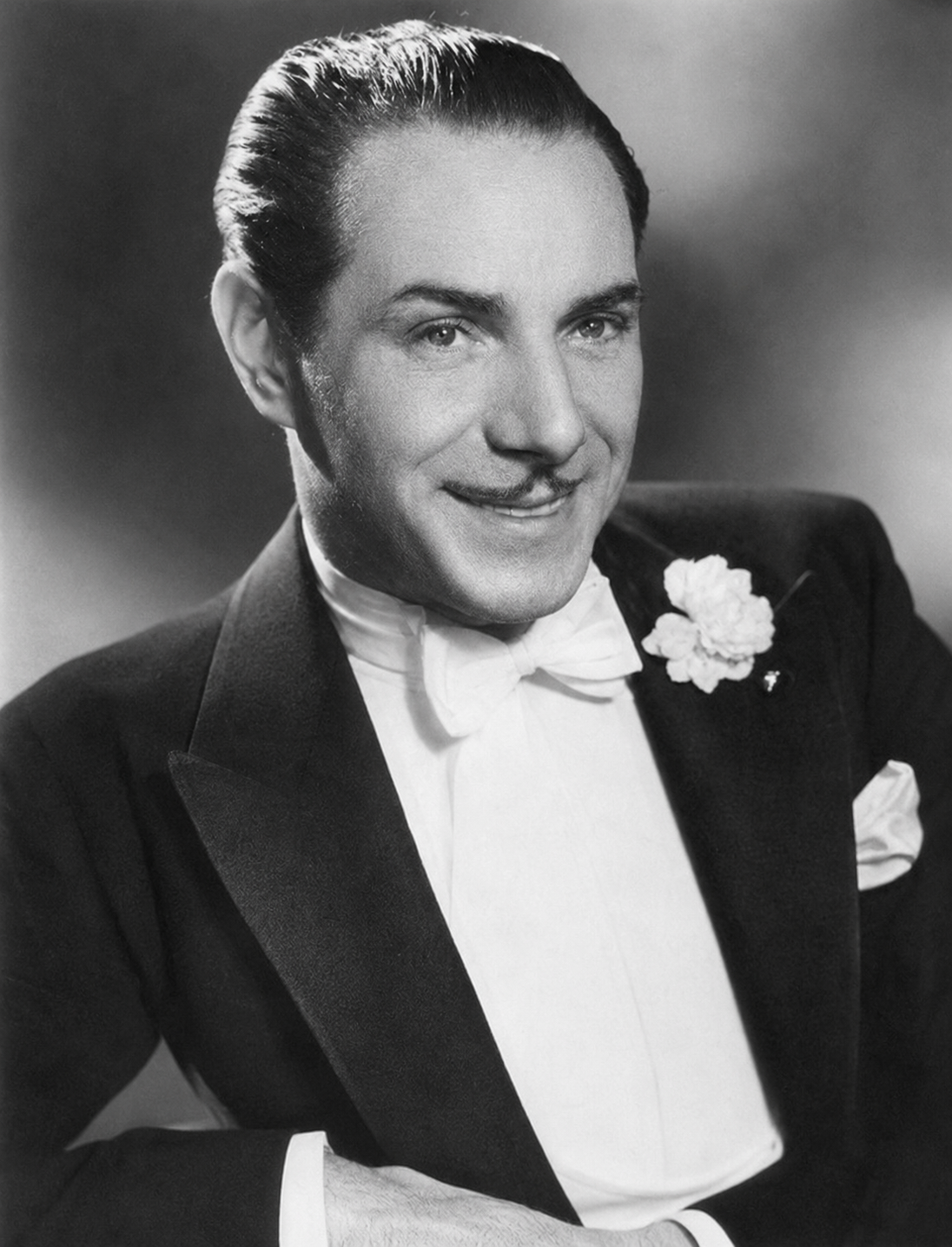
- Stanton as MC for the Fort Worth Optimist Club’s musical
- Born: Ernest George Burch; August 23, 1890; England, UK
- Died: February 6, 1944 (aged 53); Oakland, California, US
- Burial place: Forest Lawn Memorial Park, Glendale, California, US
- Occupations: actor, manager and athlete
- Spouse: Flo Stanton
- Parents: Walter Stanton; Tina Corri
- Relatives: Val Stanton (brother)

Ernest George Burch (August 23, 1890 – February 6, 1944), known professionally as Ernie Stanton, was an English-American actor, and athlete who played baseball and boxed. He also served as a baseball manager. As a vaudeville performer, he was mostly known from the vaudeville team, Val & Ernie Stanton. He was also known for the voice of Walt Disney’s, Mickey's Parrot

== Early life ==
Ernest "Ernie" George Stanton Burch was born on August 23, 1890, in England, to Walter Stanton and Annie Burch. He was baptized at St. Philip church in the Metropolitan Borough of Lambeth on 21 September 1890 with his parents being listed as Walter and Annie Stanton Burch. According to Ernie's United States passport application, the Stanton Burch family emigrated to the United States on February 18, 1899. However, the family's record in the 1900 United States census states they arrived in 1898, and were at that time living in Chicago.

Ernie's father was a comic actor who gained the moniker "The Giant Rooster" on the British stage prior to coming to the United States. He was particularly known for his performances in pantomimes. His father also worked as an acting teacher, and one his pupils was Charlie Chaplin. Also, Ernie's mother who used the nickname "Tina Corri" was a opera singer from Dublin and was a member of the Tony Pastor Company. In his youth, Ernie performed alongside his parents and brother in the vaudeville family act known as The Stantons.

== Boxing and baseball careers ==
Stanton trained as a boxer with Jack McCarron in Allentown, Pennsylvania. By 1910, he was working as a sparring partner to boxers Buck Falvey and Billy Allen while simultaneously performing in vaudeville with his family. When he was in Philadelphia, he used the nickname Young George Erne and was also another sparing partner with Jack Britton and Mike Gibbons. His father was also his manager at the time. Known in the ring as George Ernie, a 1912 article in The Butte Daily Post described him as a "welterweight champion of Maine". In 1942, he reconnected with an old opponent of his, Bill "Wild Bill" Fleming, and in a newspaper article about that meeting described Fleming as "one of the most powerful punchers ever to lace on the leather mittens".

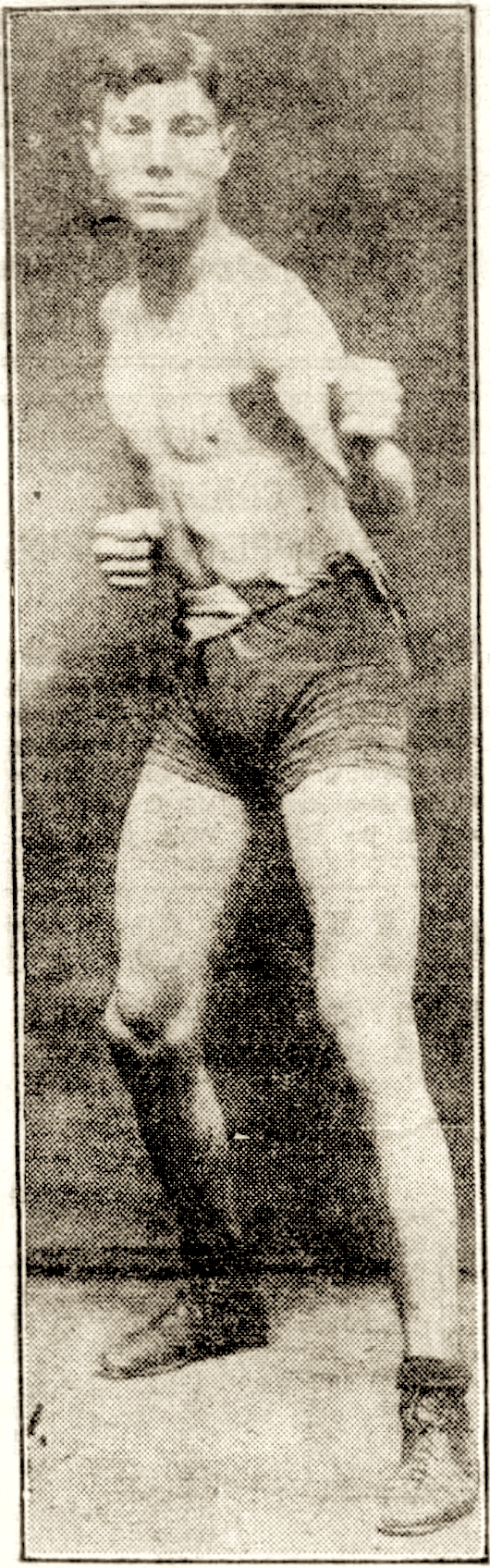
1912 photograph of Ernie Stanton

Stanton was also a baseball player. He started his career with the Jackson club team of the New York State League, where he played first base. He was then drafted by the New York Giants. He played professional baseball in 1912 for the Detroit Tigers and then for the Boston Braves in 1914. After this, he played in the Pacific Coast League on various teams; including the Oakland Oaks, Sacramento Solons, San Francisco Seals, and Los Angeles Angels. He made his Seals debut in 1923. In the 1920s, he founded and managed a baseball team put together by the National Vaudeville Artists (N.V.A.) union. Baseball legend Babe Ruth was also a member of the N.V.A and became a good friend of Stanton. Known as the N.V.A. Baseball Club, some of the team's players included comedy duo Van and Schenck, and actors Joe E. Brown, Bill Robinson, Fred Stone and many more known actors. The team won the Tri-State and semi-pro championship.

Stanton befriended Waite Hoyt and claimed that he was responsible for getting Hoyt's career started in the MLB by getting him his first job with the New York Giants. In 1923, he spent two weeks playing with the New York Yankees in New Orleans during an exhibition tour. In 1927, he participated in the Chicago Cubs spring training preparing to play in an N.V.A season.

Stanton was also a golfer. He was very known at the Glen Garden Country Club while he was on vacations and played with many golfers in the Fort Worth area.

== Vaudeville and acting career ==
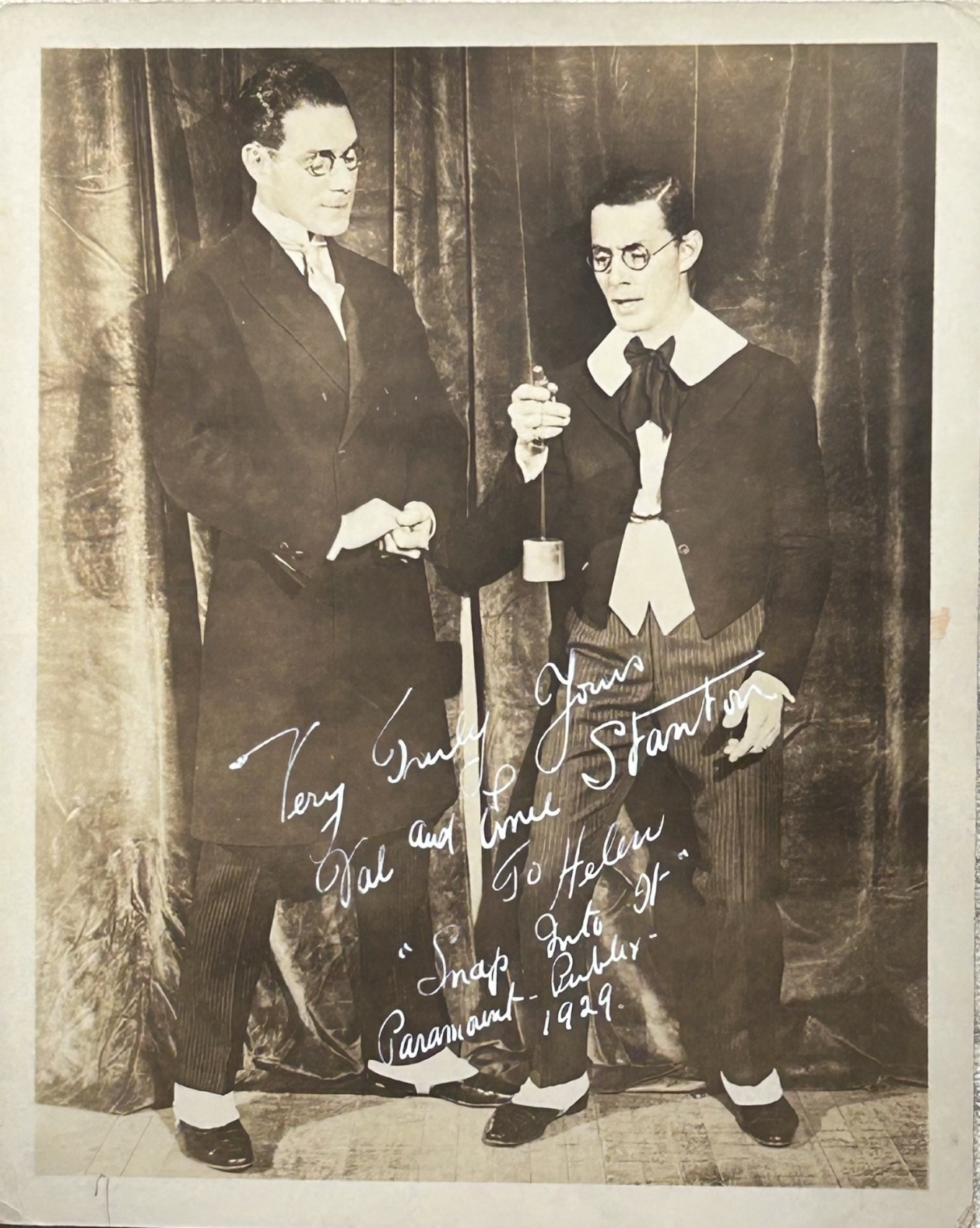
Val and Ernie (1929)

By 1910, Ernie and his brother Val Stanton had formed a comic vaudeville duo and were engaged for performances in the B. F. Keith Circuit in which they sang and exchanged witty dialogue. They were sometimes billed as Val and Ernie Stanton, and other times as the Daffydils. One of the comic sketches they performed was "Who Stole the Shoes?" They also performed on the RMS Olympic in 1922.

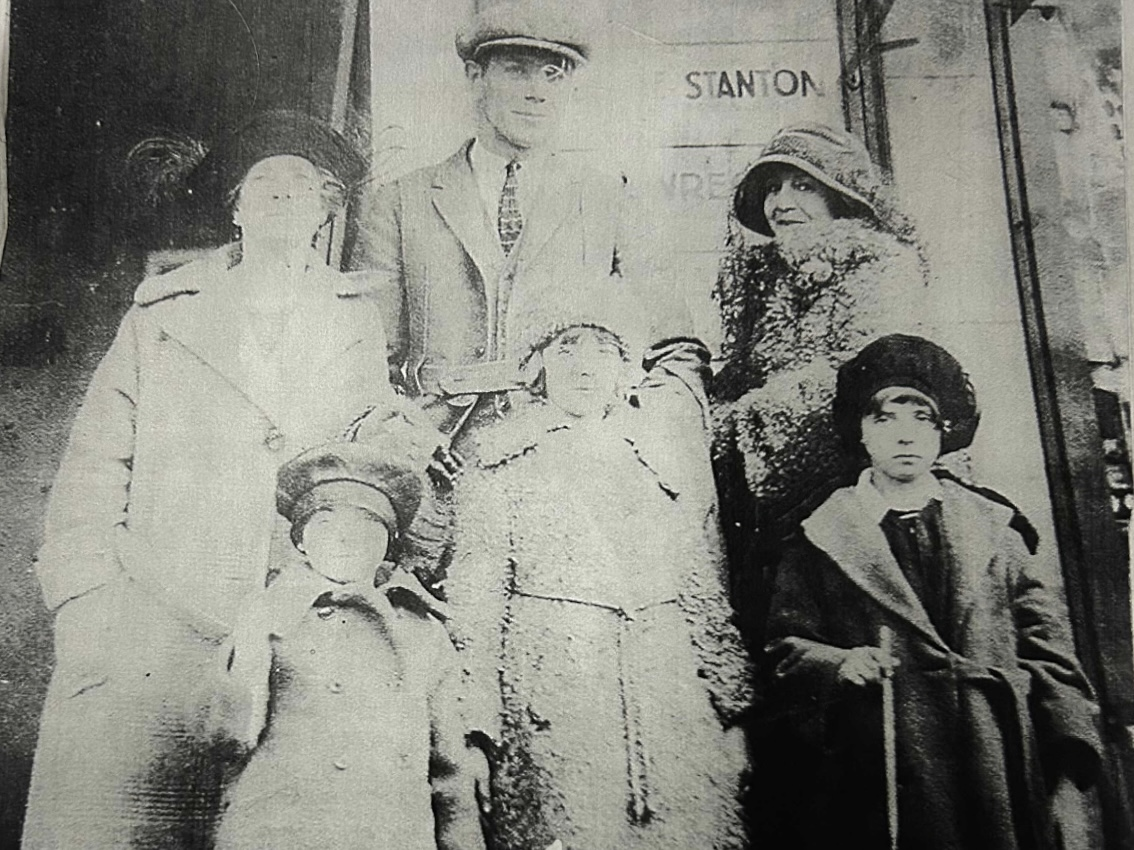
Ernie Stanton standing in the middle with his mother, Tina Corri; his nieces Doris, Marjorie, and Virginia; and another women

In 1925, they recorded an eight-minute short in London which was an early Vitaphone project. In 1928, they performed in the Vitaphone Varieties films produced by Warner Bros. The two shorts were English as She Is Not Spoken and Cut Yourself a Piece of Cake. In their act, Ernie played the harmonica, and Val played the ukulele. They were photographed together. They were described as being "Undoubtedly one of the best comedy talking acts in vaudeville."

Val and Ernie in English as She is Not Spoken (left) and Cut Yourself a Piece of Cake (right)

Ernie would go on to play many roles in films but was most famous for The Case of the Black Parrot (1941), Stage Struck (1936), and Flippen's Frolics (1936). During his film career, he got to work alongside many famous legends including, Bela Lugosi, Errol Flynn, Boris Karloff, Lon Chaney Jr., and Ralph Bellamy to name a few. Ernie also got to play with George M. Cohan in Harold's Vanities and on the Keith-Orpheum Circuit.

== Personal life ==
Ernie's life was mostly filled with his careers as an actor and athlete. In 1911, he married Mary Callan. They divorced a couple of years later. In the 1920s, he met actress Florence Holt who was nicknamed "Flo Holt" on the KGU show. Ernie and Florence got married in 1928. They had no children during their 16-year marriage. During World War II, the couple performed together in shows put on for the American armed forced by the United Service Organizations, serving in unit 27 of the USO with Ernie working as that unit's master of ceremonies.

== Death ==
Ernie died on February 6, 1944. It was that afternoon, Val and Ernie were scheduled to perform a show at the Orpheum Theatre in Oakland, California. Before the show, they went to eat dinner at a restaurant near 20th Street and Telegraph Avenue in Oakland. Coincidentally, earlier that day, Ernie had told his wife that he was feeling "funny". It was at the restaurant, around 6 p.m., that Ernie suffered a stroke and fell unconscious in his chair. He was rushed to the hospital while Val accompanied him in the ambulance. Upon their arrival to Highland Hospital, he was pronounced dead. He was only 53 years old. In the words of Val, "The show must go on". As the new hour approached, Val arrived at the theater and performed without Ernie. Among the hundreds of spectators who filled the theater to capacity, none of them knew the burden resting on Val's shoulders. He was still able to make the people laugh and smile. After the show, Val made the arrangements to send Ernie's body to the Grant D. Miller mortuary. Then he fainted.

Ernie's funeral was held on February 11, 1944 at the Wee Kirk o' the Heather Chapel and was also buried there at Forest Lawn Memorial Park

== Family ==
Besides himself and his brother Val, his wife Flo was an actress and appeared with Bob Hope on Son of Paleface. His father Walter Stanton was a famous rooster chanticleer impersonator nicknamed "The Giant Rooster" and his mother, Annie, nicknamed "Tina Corri", was a male impersonator because her voice was so deep. She was also a member of the Corri family of opera singers from Dublin and for many years a member of the Tony Pastor Company. Not only were his parents famous on the stage, his great-grandfather Haydn Corri was a famous organist in Dublin and his father, Domenico Corri, a famous Italian composer. Along with that, one of his cousins, Eugene Corri, was a famous boxing referee in London.

== Filmography ==
- Here's the Gang (1935) as Ernie Stanton – Master of Ceremonies (writer)
- Flippen's Frolics (1936) (script writer)
- Sing, Baby, Sing (1936) as Mac's Friend (uncredited)
- Stage Struck (1936 film) (1936) as Marley
- Thank You, Jeeves! (1936) as Mr. Snelling
- 15 Maiden Lane (1936) as Charles – Peyton's Butler (uncredited)
- Hats Off (1936 film) (1936) as Secretary
- After the Thin Man (1936) as Thug at Nick's Table (uncredited)
- Bulldog Drummond Escapes (1937) as Reporter (uncredited)
- The Prince and the Pauper (1937 film) (1937) as Guard (uncredited)
- Scrappy's Music Lesson (1937) as Petey Parrot (uncredited)
- Saratoga (1937) as Man in crowd (uncredited)
- The Devil's Saddle Legion (1937) as Reggie
- The Adventures of Robin Hood (1938) as Outlaw (uncredited)
- Mickey's Parrot (1938), a Disney animated film, as parrot (voice)
- Mysterious Mr. Moto (1938) as Sidewalk Artist (uncredited)
- Hell's Kitchen (1939) as Nick (uncredited)
- Mr. Wong in Chinatown (1939) as Burton - Davidson's Butler
- Pride of the Blue Grass (1939) as Roberts (uncredited)
- Foreign Correspondent (1940) as Newsmen at table (uncredited)
- A Dispatch from Reuters (1940) as Cockney News Vendor (uncredited)
- South of Suez (1940) as Private Detective (uncredited)
- Hit the Road (1941) as O'Brien – First Guard (uncredited)
- Cracked Nuts (1941) as Ivan the Robot (Shemp Howard's stunt) double
- The Case of the Black Parrot (1941) as Colonel Piggott
- Free and Easy (1941) as Duke's Horse Groom (uncredited)
- Desert Bandit (1941) as Sheriff Warde
- International Squadron (1941) as Ground man (uncredited)
- Private Nurse (1941) as Winton Butler (uncredited)
- Moonlight in Hawaii (1941) as Truck Driver (uncredited)
- The Wolf Man (1941) as Philips (uncredited)
- Obliging Young Lady (1942) as Cedric (uncredited)
- The Ghost of Frankenstein (1942) as Constable (uncredited)
- This Above All (1942) as policeman (uncredited)
- Yankee Doodle Dandy (1942) as Waiter (uncredited)

== Discography ==
- English as She Is Not Spoken (1928)
- Cut Yourself a Piece of Cake (1928)
