= Hats Off (1936 film) =

1936 American film

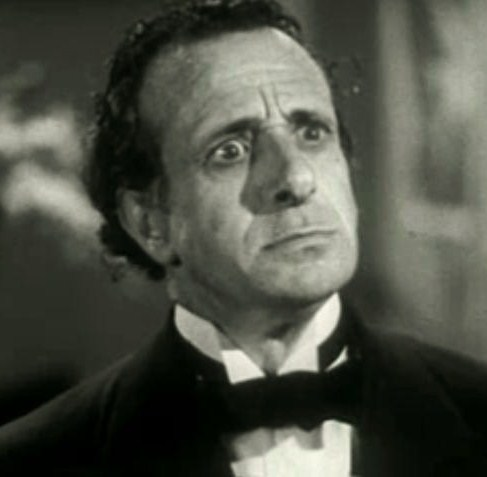
- Luis Alberni in Hats Off
- Directed by: Boris Petroff
- Written by: Samuel Fuller (screenplay); Samuel Fuller (story); Edmund Joseph (screenplay); Edmund Joseph (story); Thiele Lawrence (additional dialogue)
- Produced by: Boris Petroff
- Starring: Mae Clarke; John Payne; Helen Lynd; Luis Alberni
- Cinematography: Harry Neumann
- Edited by: Thomas Neff
- Distributed by: Grand National Pictures
- Release date: December 6, 1936
- Running time: 66 minutes
- Country: United States
- Language: English

Hats Off (1936) is an American film directed by Boris Petroff, and originally released by Grand National Pictures. The film is now in the public domain.

== Plot summary ==
A pair of Texas towns are trying to outdo one another in planning a huge fair. While one community has Jimmy Maxwell arranging the entertainment, the other brings in Jo Allen, who uses a ruse to learn about Jimmy's plans, pretending to be a school teacher named Judy while her friend Mr. Churchill passes himself off as "Joe" Allen.

After learning that Jimmy's decided on a prizefight to draw the crowds, Jo counters by contacting a New York City showman, Caesar Rosero, and attempting to coax him into bringing his entire popular troupe to Texas to perform. By the time Jo regrets fooling Jimmy and begins to develop feelings for him, Jimmy angrily takes counter measures of his own, with Rosero getting caught in between.

== Cast ==
- Mae Clarke as Jo Allen
- John Payne as Jimmy Maxwell
- Helen Lynd as Ginger Connolly
- Luis Alberni as Rosero
- Richard "Skeets" Gallagher as Buzz Morton
- Franklin Pangborn as Churchill
- Robert Middlemass as Tex Connelly
- George Irving as J.D. Murdock
- Val Stanton as Valet
- Ernie Stanton as Secretary
- Clarence Wilson as C.D. Pottingham

== Soundtrack ==
- "Hats Off" (Music by Ben Oakland, lyrics by Herb Magidson)
- "Where Have You Been All My Life?" (Music by Ben Oakland, lyrics by Herb Magidson)
- "Twinkle, Twinkle Little Star" (Music by Ben Oakland, lyrics by Herb Magidson)
- "Little Odd Rhythm" (Music by Ben Oakland, lyrics by Herb Magidson)
- "Let's Have Another" (Music by Ben Oakland, lyrics by Herb Magidson)
- "Zilch's Hats" (Music by Ben Oakland, lyrics by Herb Magidson)
