= Eric Knight =

English writer (1897–1943)

- Born: Eric Mowbray Knight; 10 April 1897; Menston, West Riding of Yorkshire, England
- Died: 15 January 1943 (aged 45); Dutch Guiana (later Suriname)
- Citizenship: British (1897–1942); American (1942–1943)
- Occupation: Writer
- Spouse(s): Dorothy Caroline Noyes Hall (m. 1917–32, divorced); Jere Brylawski (m. 1932–43, his death)
- Children: 3
- Writing career
- Language: English
- Period: 1934–1943
- Genre: Fiction
- Notable works: This Above All, Lassie Come-Home

Eric Mowbray Knight (10 April 1897 – 15 January 1943) was an English novelist and screenwriter, who is mainly known for his 1940 novel Lassie Come-Home, which introduced the fictional collie Lassie. He took American citizenship in 1942 shortly before his death.

== Biography ==
Born in Menston, West Riding of Yorkshire, Knight was the youngest of three sons born to Marion Hilda (née Creasser) and Frederic Harrison Knight, both Quakers. His father was a rich diamond merchant who, when Eric was two years old, was killed during the Boer War. His mother then moved to St. Petersburg, Imperial Russia, to work as a governess for the imperial family. The family later settled in the United States in 1912.

Knight had a varied career, including service in the Princess Patricia's Canadian Light Infantry during World War I as a signaller, then served as a captain of field artillery in the U.S. Army Reserve until 1926. His two brothers were both killed in World War I serving with the Pennsylvania Army National Guard. He did stints as an art student, newspaper reporter and Hollywood screenwriter.

He married twice, first on 28 July 1917, to Dorothy Caroline Noyes Hall, with whom he had three daughters and later divorced, and secondly to Jere Brylawski on 2 December 1932.

== Writing career ==
Knight's first novel was Invitation to Life (Greenberg, 1934). The second was Song on Your Bugles (1936) about the working class in Northern England. As "Richard Hallas", he wrote the hardboiled genre novel You Play the Black and the Red Comes Up (1938). Knight's This Above All is considered one of the significant novels of the Second World War. He also helped co-author the film, Battle of Britain in the "Why We Fight" Series under the direction of Frank Capra.

Knight and his second wife Jere Knight raised collies on their farm in Pleasant Valley, Bucks County, Pennsylvania. They resided at Springhouse Farm from 1939 to 1943. His novel Lassie Come-Home (ISBN 0030441013) was published in 1940, expanded from a short story published in 1938 in The Saturday Evening Post.

One of Knight's last books was Sam Small Flies Again, republished as The Flying Yorkshireman (Pocket Books 493, 1948; 273 pages). On the back of The Flying Yorkshireman, this blurb appeared:

England's answer to America's James Thurber or Thorne Smith, Knight created the character Sam Small, a villager from Yorkshire whose stock in trade was an endless parade of outrageous tarradiddles and tall tales. Sam's adventures are chronicled in the ten stories of this vintage volume, originally published as Sam Small Flies Again. That's right, Sam can literally fly, which puts him into all sorts of mischief. "An immensely funny book." – The New York Times.

== Works ==
=== Books ===
- Invitation to life New York, Greenberg 1934
- Song On Your Bugles New York and London, Harper & brothers 1936
- You Play The Black and The Red Comes Up (written as: Richard Hallas) (1940)
- Now Pray We for Our Country (1940)
- Lassie Come-Home (1940)
- The happy land New York and London, Harper & brothers 1940
- Sam Small flies again, the amazing adventures of the flying Yorkshireman New York and London, Harper & brothers 1942
- They don't want swamps and jungles Ottawa, Director of public information 1942
- This Above All New York, Grosset & Dunlap 1942
- Portrait of a Flying Yorkshireman (edited by Paul Rotha) (1952)

=== Film credits ===
- Under the Pampas Moon (1935)
- This Above All (1942)
- Lassie Come Home (1942)
- Son of Lassie (1945)
- Gypsy Colt (1954)
- Lassie (1994)
- Lassie (2005)

==== Documentary ====
- Why We Fight: Prelude to War (1942)
- Why We Fight: The Nazis Strike (1943)

== Death ==
In 1943, at which time he was a major in the United States Army – Special Services where he wrote two of Frank Capra's Why We Fight series, Knight was killed in a C-54 air crash in Dutch Guiana (now Suriname) in South America.
