= Eugene Corri =

Boxing referee

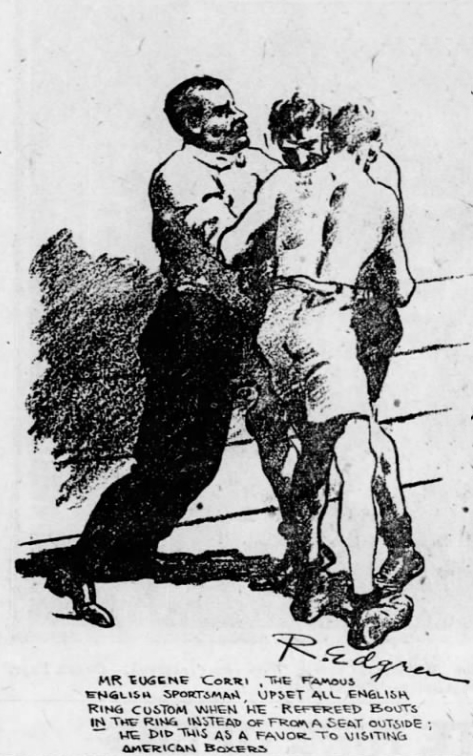
Eugene Corri refereeing a boxing match; drawing by Robert Edgren

Eugene Alfred Corri (c. 1857 − 21 December 1933) was a boxing referee. He was well-known and popular in the U.K., and was himself a boxer in his youth. His father changed his surname from Corry to Corri to make it appear more Italian in the hopes of furthering his singing career. Corri refereed over 2,000 fights, including Mickey Walker against Tommy Milligan in 1927. He makes an appearance as himself in Alfred Hitchcock's silent movie The Ring (1927), introduced to the audience by the MC. He was one of the original members of the National Sporting Club. He published several books, including Fifty Years in the Ring, which appeared the summer before he died. He died in Southend on 21 December 1933 (note: references behind paywall).

== Family ==
Corri was the youngest of 5 boys. He also many famous family members. His grandfather, Haydn Corri was an organist from Dublin. His great-grandfather was Domenico Corri, who was a famous Italian composer. Also his great aunt, Sophia Dussek Corri and great uncle, Philip Antony Corri were both musicians and composers. His cousin, Tina Corri was a singer and male impersonator; her sons were Val and Ernie Stanton, who were actors and athletes in the early 19th century. Ernie was also a boxer himself.
