= Stage Struck (1936 film) =

1936 film by Busby Berkeley

- Theatrical release poster
- Directed by: Busby Berkeley
- Written by: Tom Buckingham; Pat C. Flick; Robert Lord; Warren Duff
- Produced by: Robert Lord; Hal B. Wallis
- Starring: Dick Powell; Joan Blondell; Warren William
- Cinematography: Byron Haskin
- Edited by: Thomas Richards
- Music by: Heinz Roemheld (Songs by Harold Arlen & Yip Harburg)
- Production company: Warner Bros. Pictures
- Distributed by: Warner Bros. Pictures
- Release date: September 12, 1936
- Running time: 91 minutes
- Country: United States
- Language: English

Stage Struck is a 1936 American musical comedy film directed by Busby Berkeley and starring Dick Powell, Joan Blondell and Warren William. It was produced and distributed by Warner Bros. Pictures. The film's sets were designed by the art director Robert M. Haas.

== Plot ==
Director George Randall is producing a new Broadway revue featuring Peggy Revere, who is only cast because she is the wealthy backer of the show. The two clash incessantly during rehearsal, leading producer Fred Harris to convince her that this is because they are secretly in love with each other.

== Cast ==
- Dick Powell as George Randall
- Joan Blondell as Peggy Revere
- Warren William as Fred Harris
- Frank McHugh as Sid
- The Yacht Club Boys as Singing Quartette
- Jeanne Madden as Ruth Williams
- Carol Hughes as Gracie
- Craig Reynolds as Gilmore Frost
- Hobart Cavanaugh as Wayne
- Johnny Arthur as Oscar Freud
- Spring Byington as Mrs. Randall
- Thomas Pogue as Dr. Stanley
- Andrew Tombes as Burns Heywood
- Lulu McConnell as Toots O'Connor
- Val Stanton as Cooper
- Ernie Stanton as Marley
- Edward Gargan as Rordan
- Eddy Chandler as Heney
- Libby Taylor as Yvonne
- Mary Gordon as Mrs. Cassidy

== Bibliography ==
- Daniel Bubbeo. The Women of Warner Brothers. McFarland, 2001.
