= Walter Stanton =

English actor

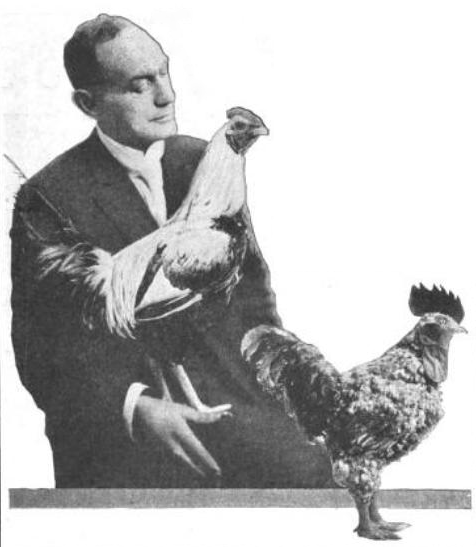
- Profiled in Collier's in 1925
- Born: Walter Stanton Burch; June 30, 1855; London, England
- Died: October 29, 1943 (aged 88); Los Angeles, California, US
- Occupations: Actor and entertainer
- Years active: 1879–1930
- Known for: The Giant Rooster
- Spouse: Tina Corri (m. 1885, divorced)
- Children: Val Stanton; Ernie Stanton

Walter Stanton Burch (June 30, 1855 – October 29, 1943), known professionally as "The Giant Rooster", was an English-American actor and entertainer.

== Acting career ==
In 1879, Stanton Burch began performing animal mimics to make money. He stated that his father was a mimic and that he had inherited that same gift.

In 1883, he was featured as "The Human Barnyard" at Keith's Dime Theatre in Boston.

By 1885, his impersonations included animals like a turkey, duck, raven, pigeon, and eventually his main role as a rooster. He toured theatres and fairs throughout Europe, Australia, New Zealand, America and beyond. In 1888, he was officially featured as "The Giant Rooster" on the stage at Barnum & Bailey circus.

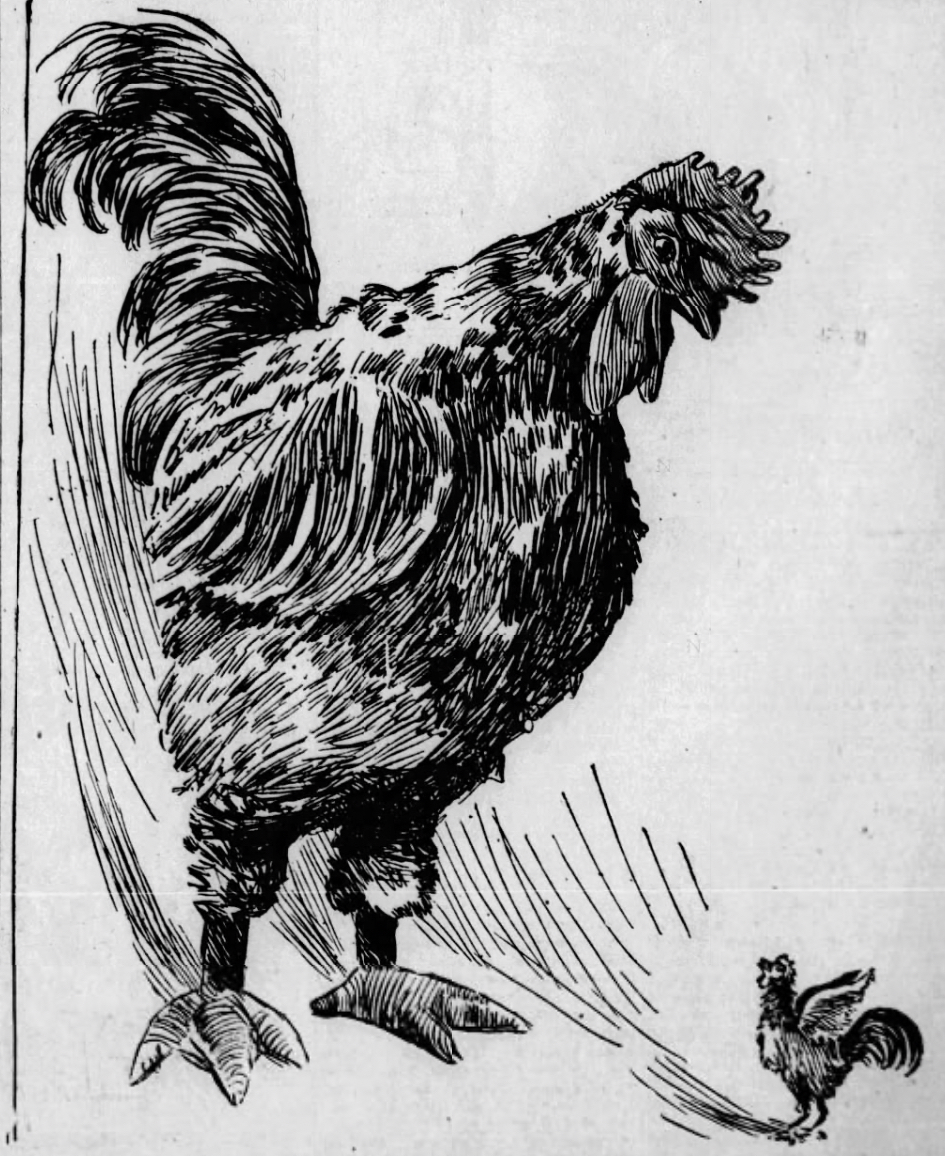
Walter Stanton, Made up like a giant rooster, in his set-to with a gamecock

In 1890, he was described as the "stellar attraction" for months at the Paris Hippodrome. He appeared on billboards and banners as "Monsieur Stanton: Chantecler". He was described as a "household word" throughout France. Poet Edmond Rostand was in the audience in one of his shows and applauded him. He also worked with Maude Adams in those shows.

Around that time in the 1890s and early 1900s, he did duet shows with his wife and eventually with his son Val when he reached adolescence.

Walter was a tutor during this time, including his sons and Charlie Chaplin.

== Personal life ==
He married opera singer Tina Corri on October 15, 1885 in Liverpool, England. Their two sons, Valentine and Ernest, were born in 1886 and 1890, respectively. They later divorced.

They immigrated to the United States through Chicago in 1898.

== Family ==
His two sons, Val and Ernie became actors and athletes.

== Filmography ==
- The Mechanical Head (1903) as Actor
- Burlesque Cock Fight (1903) as Himself
