= Mickey's Parrot =

1938 Mickey Mouse cartoon

- Poster
- Directed by: Ben Sharpsteen
- Written by: Jack Kinney (uncredited)
- Produced by: Walt Disney
- Starring: Walt Disney; Lee Millar; Ernie Stanton
- Music by: Leigh Harline; Oliver Wallace
- Animation by: Frenchy de Trémaudan; Louie Schmittt; Chuck Couch; Eddie Strickland; Clyde Geronimi; Paul Satterfield; Archie Robin; Don Patterson
- Production company: Walt Disney Productions
- Distributed by: RKO Radio Pictures
- Release date: September 9, 1938
- Running time: 7 minutes
- Country: United States
- Language: English

Mickey's Parrot is an animated short film produced by Walt Disney, distributed by RKO Radio Pictures and released on September 9, 1938. The film was directed by Ben Sharpsteen and animated by Frenchy de Trémaudan, Louie Schmittt, Chuck Couch, Eddie Strickland, Clyde Geronimi, Paul Satterfield, Archie Robin, Don Patterson. It was the 102nd short in the Mickey Mouse film series to be released, and the fourth for that year.

== Plot ==
In this short, a talking parrot escapes from a truck and enters the home of Mickey and Pluto, who hear news of a killer on the loose, and mistake the parrot for the killer.

== Voice cast ==
- Mickey Mouse: Walt Disney
- Pluto: Lee Millar
- Parrot: Ernie Stanton
- Radio announcer: unknown actor

== Releases ==
- 1938 - original theatrical release
- 1957 - The Mickey Mouse Club, episode #3.24 (TV)
- c. 1972 - The Mouse Factory, episode #1.7: "Water Sports" (TV)
- c. 1983 - Good Morning, Mickey!, episode No. 1 (TV)
- 1989 - The Magical World of Disney, episode #33.15: "Mickey's Happy Valentine Special" (TV)
- c. 1992 - Mickey's Mouse Tracks, episode No. 16 (TV)
- c. 1992 - Donald's Quack Attack, episode No. 34 (TV)
- 1998 - The Ink and Paint Club, episode #39: "Minnie Mouse" (TV)
- 2011 - Have a Laugh!, episode No. 25 (TV)

== Home media ==
The short was released on December 4, 2001, on Walt Disney Treasures: Mickey Mouse in Living Color.

Additional releases include:

- 1981 - "Mickey Mouse and Donald Duck Cartoon Collections Volume Three" (VHS)
- 1989 - "Cartoon Classics: Mickey and the Gang" (VHS)
