= This Above All =

1941 novel by Eric Knight

- First edition
- Author: Eric Knight
- Language: English
- Genre: War novel Romance
- Publisher: Cassell
- Publication date: 1941
- Publication place: United Kingdom
- OCLC: 3570505
- LC Class: PR6021.N417

This Above All (1941) is a novel by English writer Eric Knight. It was adapted into an Academy Award-winning movie in 1942.

== Title ==
The title of the novel is derived from a quote by Polonius in William Shakespeare's Hamlet (Act 1, scene 3): "This above all: to thine own self be true,/ And it must follow, as the night the day,/ Thou canst not then be false to any man."

== Synopsis ==
Spending leave together on the South Coast during the Battle of Britain and the beginning of the blitz, Clive and Prudence have an affair. Having survived Dunkirk, but having a crisis of conscience over what the war is being fought for and disgusted at the incompetence of the ruling elite, Clive decides not to return to the Army and to go absent without leave.

=== Characters ===
- Clive Briggs/Hanley: A working-class private in the British Army who fought in France and returned to England via Dunkirk.
- Prudence Cathaway: An upper-middle-class sergeant in the Women's Auxiliary Air Force.

== Reception ==
The publishers of the book called it "The first great novel of the war". Kirkus Review agreed with the byline but characterised it more as a love story than a war story. It said that the book was, "... a cross section of England, under fire; it gives one a deep conviction of something more to be won than the shell of the old England."

== Adaptations ==
The novel has been adapted to a movie of the same name in 1942 directed by Anatole Litvak and starring Tyrone Power and Joan Fontaine. It won the Academy Award for Best Art Direction, Black-and-White.
