= This Above All (film) =

1942 film by Anatole Litvak

- Film poster
- Directed by: Anatole Litvak
- Screenplay by: R. C. Sherriff; Eric Knight (novel)
- Produced by: Darryl F. Zanuck
- Starring: Tyrone Power; Joan Fontaine
- Cinematography: Arthur Miller
- Edited by: Walter Thompson
- Music by: Alfred Newman
- Distributed by: 20th Century Fox
- Release date: May 12, 1942
- Running time: 110 minutes
- Country: United States
- Language: English
- Box office: $2.4 million (US rentals)

This Above All is a 1942 American romance film directed by Anatole Litvak and starring Tyrone Power and Joan Fontaine as a couple from different social classes who fall in love in wartime England. The supporting cast features Thomas Mitchell, Nigel Bruce, and Gladys Cooper. Set in World War II, the film is adapted from Eric Knight's 1941 novel of the same name.

== Plot ==
On the day that France surrenders to Nazi Germany in 1940, Prudence "Pru" Cathaway, a strong-willed young woman from the upper class, joins the Women's Auxiliary Air Force (WAAF), the women's organisation of the Royal Air Force, to her family's surprise. Her aunt Iris and uncle Wilbur disapprove since she has chosen to serve as a private rather than as an officer. However, family butler Parsons privately expresses his support.

She goes off to training camp, where she makes friends with fellow WAAF Violet Worthing. As a favor to Violet, Prudence agrees to go on a double date one night; she is paired with Clive Briggs, a moody mysterious soldier with a dark secret. He seems to her rather bitter about something and is indifferent, even hostile, to her aristocratic background, but she likes him, and he asks her out again; romance blooms between them.

On a holiday together on the southern coast, Pru twice overhears Clive talking in his sleep. The second time, she wakes him up, but he does not want to talk about it. Then his friend Monty shows up. When the three go to dinner, Pru learns from Monty that Clive is up for a Distinguished Conduct Medal for his actions during the Dunkirk evacuation. While Pru is dancing with someone else, Monty pleads with Clive to return with him. He was given a month's sick leave, but that was over two months ago, and he is about to be posted as a deserter.

Finally, Clive tells Pru, indirectly, about his predicament and that he no longer wants to fight for the benefit of an English elite that oppresses and humiliates people of his class. Pru makes an impassioned plea for all the good things that England represents, but when she wakes up the next morning, Clive has gone, leaving her a letter of goodbye.

When a farmer finds Clive sleeping in his barn, he tries to take him to the authorities. Clive gets away after a struggle, but suffers a wrist injury. He goes to a district nurse, Emily Harvey. After attending to his wrist, she lets him go without alerting the police. Later, a one-armed rector, despite hearing that a suspected German spy with an injured wrist is loose, invites Clive in for tea. A talk with him enables Clive to come to a decision: he will give himself up. He telephones Pru and tells her so. They arrange to meet in London and get married first, though.

However, Clive is taken into custody after hanging up. Clive asks the officer in charge to allow him two hours to keep his appointment. A member of the upper class that Clive despises, the officer grants his request, accepting full responsibility for this unusual action. Clive sets out for the meeting place, Charing Cross railway station, in the midst of a German air raid. On the way, however, a man tells him that a kid is trapped in the cellar of a burning building. He and another man rescue the child and another person, but then the building collapses onto him.

When Clive does not show up, Pru goes to her father, a doctor, for help. Dr. Cathaway learns that Clive suffered a head injury and is to be operated on within the hour. Cathaway and two other doctors operate. Afterward, Clive and Pru are married, with Monty and her father in attendance. Clive tells Pru that she was right. They must fight for what she believes in first before they can fight for what he believes in. The film ends with it left unclear whether Clive recovers or not.

== Cast ==
- Tyrone Power as Clive Briggs
- Joan Fontaine as Prudence Cathaway
- Thomas Mitchell as Monty
- Henry Stephenson as General Cathaway
- Nigel Bruce as Ramsbottom
- Gladys Cooper as Iris Cathaway
- Philip Merivale as Dr. Roger Cathaway
- Sara Allgood as Waitress
- Alexander Knox as Rector
- Queenie Leonard as Violet Worthing
- Melville Cooper as Wilbur
- Jill Esmond as Nurse Emily
- Holmes Herbert as Dr. Mathias
- Denis Green as Dr. Ferris
- Arthur Shields as Chaplain
- Dennis Hoey as Parsons
- Thomas Louden as Vicar
- Miles Mander as Major
- Val Stanton as policeman (uncredited)
- Ernie Stanton as policeman (uncredited)
- Mary Field as Hotel Maid

== Reception ==
Bosley Crowther, critic for The New York Times, described it as "a taut and poignant war film" and "a very moving love story with a sensitive regard for tensile passions against a background of England at war", though he also felt that "The principal weakness of the picture is that it accentuates the original's [novel's] chief fault—that is, it skimps a rationalization of the leading character's profound change of mind. And it also neglects to establish the convictions to which he so stubbornly holds."

== Awards ==
Richard Day, Joseph C. Wright, and Thomas Little won the Oscar for Best Art Direction, Black-and-White. Arthur Miller was nominated for Best Cinematography, Walter A. Thompson for Best Editing, Edmund H. Hansen for Best Sound Recording.
