= Isn't Life Wonderful =

1924 film by D. W. Griffith

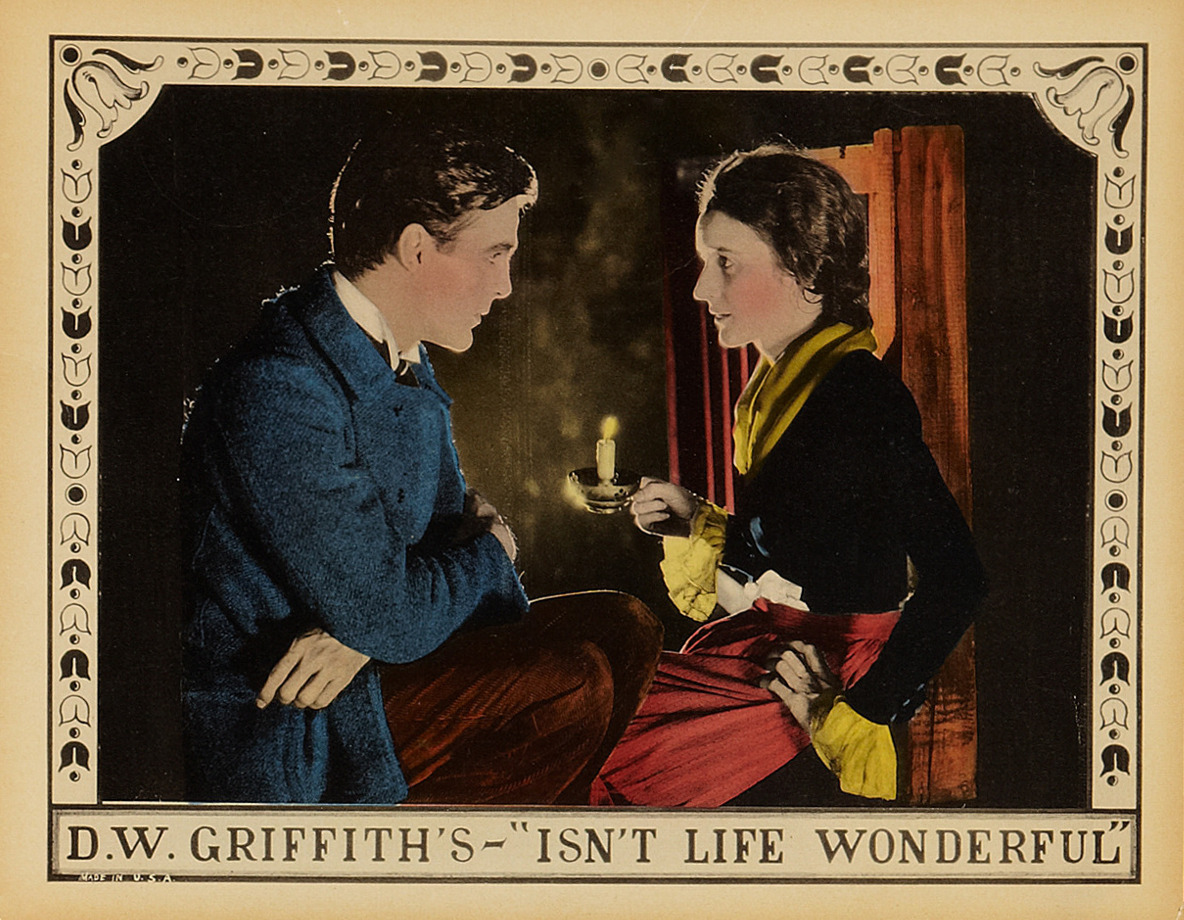
- Lobby card
- Directed by: D. W. Griffith
- Written by: D. W. Griffith
- Based on: "Isn't Life Wonderful?" by Geoffrey Moss
- Produced by: D. W. Griffith
- Starring: Carol Dempster; Neil Hamilton
- Cinematography: Hendrik Sartov; Harold S. Sintzenich
- Music by: Louis Silvers; Cesare Sodero
- Production company: D. W. Griffith Productions
- Distributed by: United Artists
- Release date: November 23, 1924
- Running time: 120 minutes
- Country: United States
- Language: Silent (English intertitles)
- Budget: $260,000
- Box office: $400,000

Isn't Life Wonderful (1924)

Isn't Life Wonderful is a 1924 American silent romantic drama film directed by D. W. Griffith for his company D. W. Griffith Productions, and distributed by United Artists. It was based on the short story "Isn't Life Wonderful?" in the 1923 book Defeat by Geoffrey Moss, and it was released under the alternative title Dawn.

== Plot ==
After World War I, displaced families flood Berlin, including a Polish professor and his relatives. Food is scarce. The family finds housing but can barely afford to eat, sometimes surviving on one potato per person and horse turnips.

Paul and his cousin Inga want to build a life together. Inga finds work collecting household basics. Paul builds a hut and plants a garden, growing enough potatoes for winter.

A group of starving workers, led by one man, follows them during harvest and steals the entire crop. Another worker helps with the theft. Paul and Inga lose everything.

Inga tells Paul that despite the loss, they still have each other, and life still has meaning. (Note: The contemporary review in The Moving Picture World refers to the character of Paul as "Hans".)

== Cast ==
- Carol Dempster as Inga
- Neil Hamilton as Paul
- Erville Alderson as the professor
- Helen Lowell as the grandmother
- Marcia Harris as the aunt
- Frank Puglia as Theodor
- Hans Adalbert Schlettow as leader of the workers
- Paul Rehkopf as hungry worker
- Walter Plimmer Jr. as the American
- Lupino Lane as Rudolph
- Robert Scholtz
- Dick Sutherland
- Louis Wolheim

== Production ==
Most of the scenes were filmed in Germany and Austria. Only one was filmed in New York at the studio. The film was a failure at the box office, and it led to Griffith leaving United Artists shortly after its run in theaters.

== Reception ==
The film did receive some positive critical notices at the time, and its stock has risen considerably since its initial release; it has for some decades been considered one of Griffith's great films.

== Legacy ==
The title of the film was spoofed in the Charley Chase comedy Isn't Life Terrible? (1925).

== Preservation ==
Prints of Isn't Life Wonderful are held by the UCLA Film and Television Archive, Cinematek (Brussels, Belgium), Filmoteka Narodowa (Warsaw, Poland), Museum of Modern Art, Arhiva Națională de Filme (Bucharest, Romania), George Eastman Museum Motion Picture Collection, and Danish Film Institute (Copenhagen, Denmark).
