= Sophia Dussek =

British musician (1775–1831)

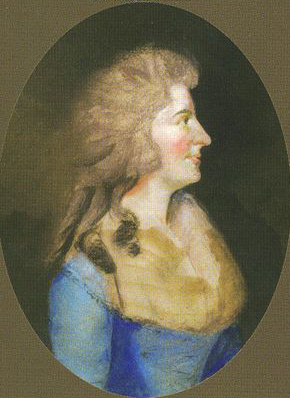
Portrait of Sophia Dussek

Sophia Giustina Dussek (née Corri; later Moralt; 1 May 1775 in Edinburgh – c. 1831 in London) was a Scottish singer, pianist, harpist, and composer of Italian descent.

In 1792, Dussek married the composer Jan Ladislav Dussek. Following Jan's death in 1812, Sophia married the violist John Alvis Moralt. The couple lived in Paddington, where she founded a music school.

The opus 2 sonatas were published in at least 3 editions in the 1790s by the Corri-Dussek company in London as by Madame Dussek, and there is no reason to doubt that the 6 sonatas of opus 2, including the famous C minor sonata published and misattributed by Schott as by JL, are anything but the work of Sophia. Paris editions of opus 2 published by Pleyel only bear the name Dussek, leading Zabaleta to his misattribution, but nobody actually claimed opus 2 as the work of JL rather than Dussek before the mid-20th century.

== Life and family ==
Sophia Dussek was born into the Corri family. She studied voice with her father, composer, music publisher, and impresario Domenico Corri. Her uncle was composer Natale Corri and her cousin was soprano Fanny Corri-Paltoni. Her father provided Sophia with vocal instruction and had her performing from a young age. She was well known as a soprano and composer of songs.

After moving to London in 1788, she studied with Luigi Marchesi and Giovanni Battista Cimador. Dussek was a highly accomplished performer and she had her London debut at the prestigious Salomon concerts in 1791 with Haydn directing from the harpsichord, and afterwards sang quite a bit of the series, taking part in the first performance of Haydn’s The Storm. In 1792, she sang the lead in the premiere of Harriet Wainwright's opera Comala.

She also played a big role in the introduction of Mozart's music to London. She was a soloist in the London premiere of the Requiem, given at John Ashley's Lenten Oratorios, Covent Garden, on 20 February 1801. In 1792 she married Jan Ladislav Dussek. She had been performing, singing and playing the piano and harp with him for some time before that. Their daughter, Olivia, was also a pianist, harpist, and composer.

In 1796, Sophia began having serious marital troubles with her husband. In an account of uncertain veracity, it was reported that Sophia, who had fallen in love with another man, asked Dussek for money to repair her harp. She then used the money to leave the house, removing her belongings in her harp case, and claiming to have left for dinner with a female friend. A suspicious Dussek went with his father-in-law to the man's house, where Sophia locked herself in. She and Dussek argued, and she cursed him, claiming to be pregnant by the other man. Dussek, relenting, promised her freedom to do what she wanted; this led to a reconciliation of sorts.

Sophia had to wait until she knew Dussek had died before she could remarry. After Jan Ladislav's death in 1812 Sophia married the viola player John Alvis Moralt. They lived in Paddington, where she established a music school. She published sonatas, rondos, variations, and numerous arrangements for the piano or harp.

== Works list ==
=== Keyboard ===
- Sonata for pianoforte (harpsichord) with violin or flute, Op. 1 (London, ca. 1793)
- 3 Sonatas for harpsichord (pianoforte) with violin, Op. 1 (Paris)
- Sonata for pianoforte (London, ca. 1805)

=== Keyboard or harp ===
- The New German Waltz – adapted as a Rondo for Harp or Piano Forte (1799)

=== Harp ===
- 3 Sonatas with Scots Airs and Reels for the Adagios & Rondos, Op. 2 (Book I): B♭, G, C minor (London, Corri & Co., 1794)
- 3 Sonatas with Scots Airs and Reels for the Adagios & Rondos, Op. 2 (Book II): E♭, F, C (London, Corri & Co., 1795)
- A French air with variations (London, Chappel & Co., 1820)
- "C’est l’amour": A 3rd French air with variations (London, Chappel & Co., 1820)
- Introduction and March (London, 1822)
- Variations on God Save the King (London, 1822)
- "La Chasse": An original rondo (London, Chappel & Co., 1824)
- At least 7 sets of Favorite Airs (London), some with flute or violin ad libitum
- Arrangements

=== Harp and piano ===
- Duett (London, ca. 1812)
- Introduction and Waltz (London, 1822)
- Arrangements

== Editions ==
- Sophia Corri. Main Works for Solo Harp: 6 Sonatas Op. 2 / French Air / C’est l’Amour / La Chasse. Ed. Floraleda Sacchi. Ut Orpheus Edizioni, 2010, ISMN 979-0-2153-1828-1

== Selected discography ==
- Sophia Giustina Corri: Works for solo harp. Includes six Sonatas. Performed (on historical instrument) by Floraleda Sacchi (Tactus Records, 2009, TC.772801)
- Sophia Corri Dussek: Works for solo harp. Includes six Sonatas. Performed (on historical instrument) by Floraleda Sacchi (Amadeus Arte, 2011, AAP11006)
- Sophia Corri-Dussek: works for harp & piano. Includes Piano sonata in A major. Performed (on historical instruments) by Floraleda Sacchi and Marco Cadario (Amadeus Arte, 2011, AAP11007)
- Madame et Monsieur Dussek: harp sonatas, sonatinas and pieces performed (on historical instrument) by Masumi Nagasawa (Etcetera Records, 2012, KTC 1439)
- Jan Ladislav Dussek. Duos for harp & pianoforte: Sophia's Introduction & waltz performed (on historical instruments) by Masumi Nagasawa & Richard Egarr (Etcetera Records, 2012, KTC 1436)
- Dussek, Jan Ladislav & Sophia: Harp sonatas by Kyunghee Kim-Sutre (Sonarti records, 2013, RT01)
