= Floraleda Sacchi =

Italian harpist, composer and musicologist

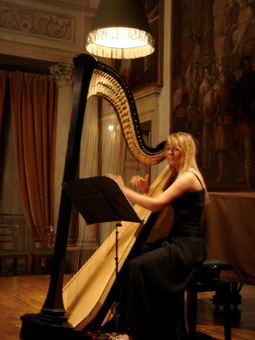
Floraleda Sacchi

Floraleda Sacchi (14 June 1978) is an Italian harpist, composer and musicologist.

== Biography ==
Sacchi was born in Como. She studied music in Italy, the United States, and Canada, including with Alice Giles, Judy Loman, and Alice Chalifoux. She has won prizes in Italy and internationally at 16 music competitions. She has performed concerts in Europe, North and South America, and Asia. She plays pedal harp, electric harp, and Celtic harp, as well as historical single- and double-action pedal harp.

She has written musicological articles on the harp. She wrote a book entitled Elias Parish Alvars: Life, Music, Documents which was published in 1999 and received the Harpa Award. She has edited 18th and 19th century harp music by little-known composers such as Sophia Dussek and Alphonse Hasselmans.

She is the creator of Mystery Tales (for actor, harp and string quartet) and Travel to the Moon (for actor, harp and planetarium). In June 2007, she performed for Ottavia Piccolo's monologue Donna non rieducabile, based on a text by Stefano Massini. The show was made into a film by Felice Cappa in 2009, produced by RAI TV with the title "Il sangue, la neve" ("The Blood, the Snow"). The film was presented at the 66th Venice Film Festival.

Since 2006, Floraleda Sacchi has been the artistic director of the Lake Como Festival.

== Publications ==
- Elias Parish Alvars: life, music, documents; annotated catalogue of his works for harp, piano, orchestra and voice. Dornach: Odilia Publishing. 1999. ISBN 978-3-9521367-1-3.
