= Geoffrey Moss =

British soldier and writer (1885–1954)

Major Geoffrey Cecil Gilbert McNeill-Moss (11 December 1885 – 13 August 1954) was a British soldier and writer, who published under the name Geoffrey Moss.

Moss was educated at Rugby and the Royal Military College, Sandhurst, and was commissioned into the Grenadier Guards in 1905. In the First World War he reached the rank of Major, before retiring in 1919 to devote himself to his writing. His first novel, Sweet Pepper (1923) – a romance novel set in the former Austro-Hungarian Empire in the aftermath of the First World War – was a bestseller and was followed a year later by the popular and influential short story collection, Defeat (1923). Thereafter Moss published roughly a book a year until the outbreak of the Second World War, his œuvre comprising novels, short story collections, verse, children's stories and works of non-fiction on European politics and military matters.

Although entirely forgotten today, Moss's works seem to have been extremely popular among general readers (if not always among critics) and influential among his fellow writers. Defeat, which is made up of six thematically linked short stories dealing with life in Germany in the wake of defeat in the First World War, influenced the attitudes of a number of British writers towards Germany in the interwar period, including Graham Greene who attributed his pro-German sympathies in the early 1920s to Moss's stories. The popular appeal of the subject matter is also attested to by the fact that "Isn't Life Wonderful!", the penultimate story in the collection, was made into an acclaimed film by American director D. W. Griffith in the mid-1920s.

Nevertheless, despite a prolific output between the wars and the popular appeal of his work, Moss never received plaudits from the critics, who tended to dismiss his fiction as sentimental and old-fashioned.

== Bibliography ==
- Notes on Elementary Field Training (n.d.)
- Sweet Pepper (1923)
- Defeat (1924, reprinted 1925 and 1932)
- Whipped Cream (1926)
- New Wine: A Nocturne in Tinsel (1927)
- The Three Cousins (1928)
- That Other Love (1929)
- Little Green Apples (1930)
- Wet Afternoon (1931)
- A Modern Melody (1932)
- I Face the Stars (1933)
- Thursby (1933)
- A Box of Dates – “History Rhymes for Children and Grown-Up People” (1934)
- The Epic of the Alcazar: A History of the Siege of the Toledo Alcazar, 1936 (1937)
- The Legend of Badajoz (1937)
- Standing up to Hitler (1939)
