= Domenico Corri =

Italian composer (1746–1825)

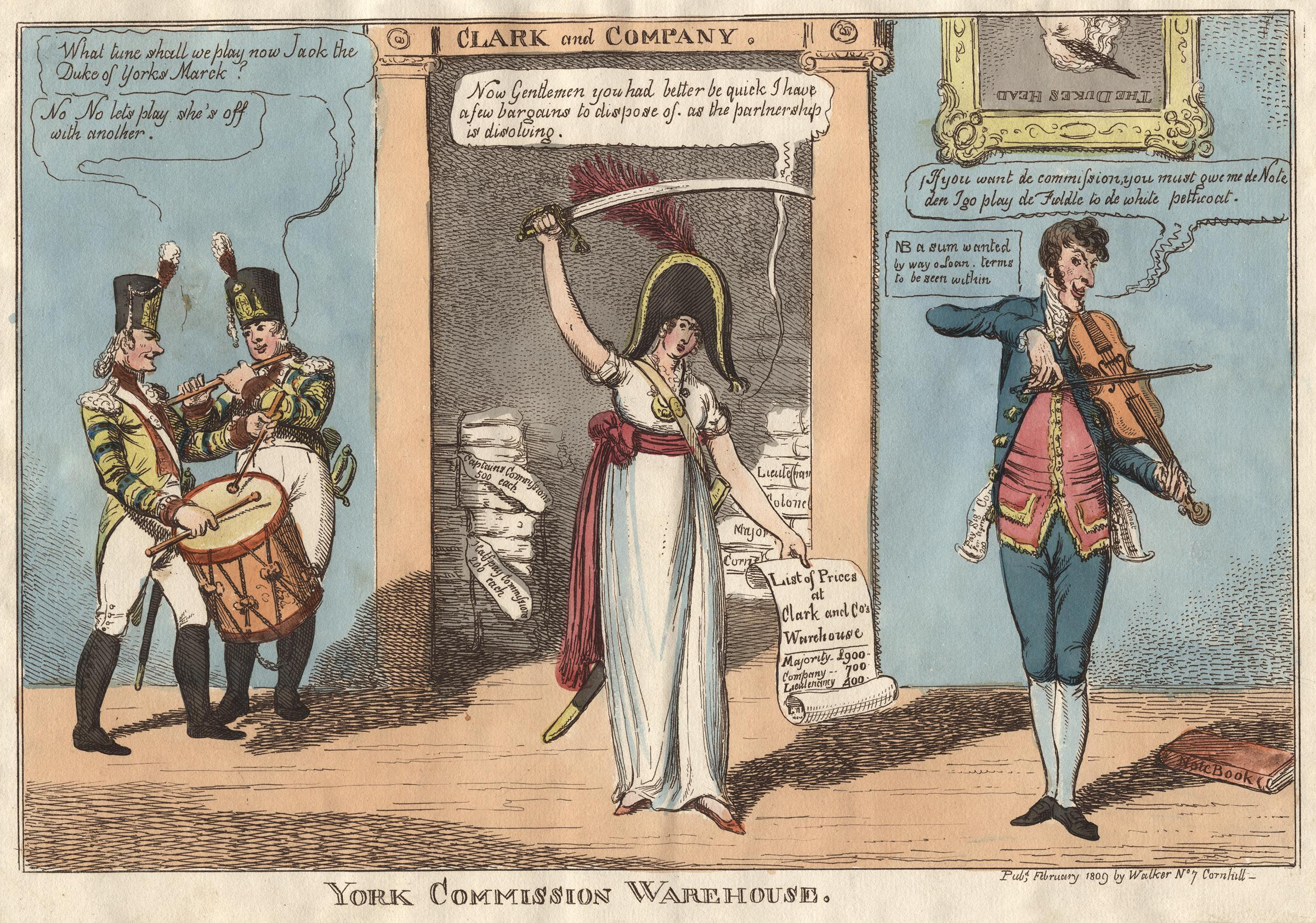
Caricature of Domenico Corri fiddling

Domenico Corri (4 October 1746 – 22 May 1825) was an Italian composer, impresario, music publisher, and voice teacher.

== Career ==
Corri was born in Rome and studied voice with Nicola Porpora in Naples. The son of a confectioner in a religious house, the Cardinal Portocaro nearly persuaded young Corri to study for the priesthood; but his musical aptitude early asserting itself, he found himself in Naples, a pupil of Porpora. In the house of this prince of singing masters—himself a pupil of Scarlatti and the world-renowned master of Mingotti and Farinelli—Corri boarded for five years (1763-1767), and chiefly owed his introduction into the best English society at Rome to the fame of Porpora and the estimation in which that great singer was held by a section of our nobility. In 1771 he moved to Scotland with his wife Francesca Bachelli (1749?-1802) to take up a position as a musician for the Edinburgh Musical Society. The Edinburgh Musical Society actually wanted to recruit Bachelli, but she requested that they also hire Corri, who had recently become her husband. Initially, Corri only performed in the Edinburgh Musical Society Concerts, but over time he became involved in several musical ventures all over the city including becoming the manager of the Edinburgh Vauxhall Pleasure Gardens, the Theatre Royal, setting up his own publishing house and establishing himself as a skilled singing master. His daughter (Sophia Giustina Corri), who was a talented singer and pianist, was one of his pupils.

=== Corri, Dussek & Co. ===
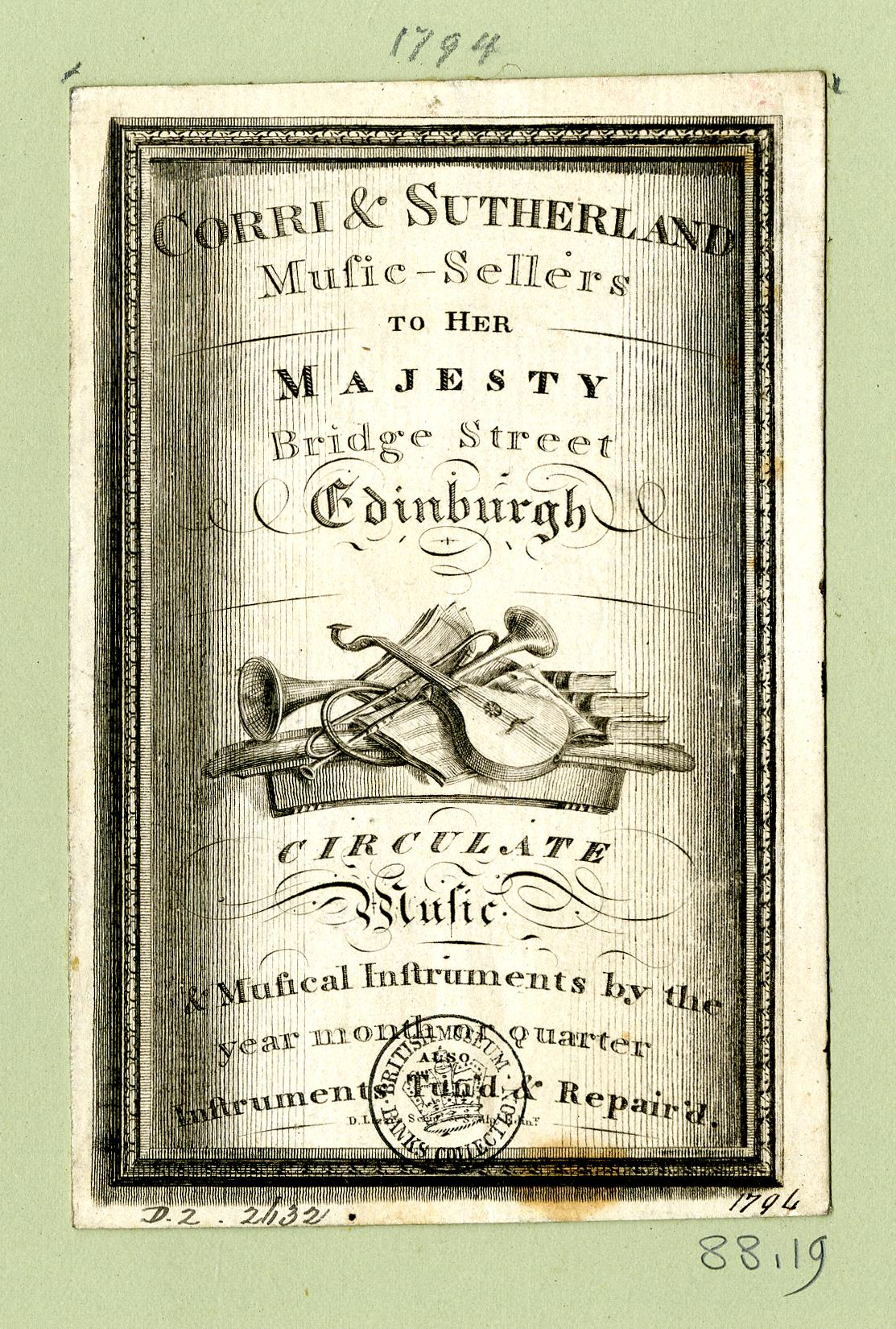
Corri's trade card

Some time after arriving in Edinburgh Corri founded a publishing business there with his son John Corri and a musician named James Sutherland. When Sutherland died in 1790 the company ceased to exist. Around that time he moved to London and began publishing vocal music in Soho while retaining business premises in Edinburgh. Corri had financial problems on several occasions. His son-in-law Jan Ladislav Dussek joined the company in 1794. When Corri, Dussek & Co. went bankrupt, Dussek left England for Germany, leaving behind his family, and his father-in-law (Corri) apparently in a debtor's jail. The business was later taken over in 1804 by his son Philippe Corri. An apprentice to Corri in London was Isaac Nathan.

=== Vauxhall Pleasure Gardens ===
Domenico Corri was also the manager of the Vauxhall Pleasure Gardens in London. In 1812, Corri organised a concert in the Argyll Rooms in Regent Street, London. In this, the favorite concert hall in London at this time, Corri put together quite a contrasting program as the evening's entertainment: Giovanni Battista Pergolesi's Stabat Mater combined with a Ball. Corri died in London, aged 78.

== Family ==
Three of his children were musicians: Sophia Giustina Corri (1775–1831), who later used the name Sophia Corri Dussek, Philip Antony Corri (1784–1832), who later immigrated to Baltimore, MD using the name Arthur Clifton, and Haydn Corri (1785–1860). His brother Natale Corri, was also a composer. A niece, Fanny Corri-Paltoni, was a successful soprano. His great grandchildren included Eugene Corri, a boxing referee and Tina Corri an actress and singer; her children were Val and Ernie Stanton who were both vaudeville actors and athletes. One of his descendants was puppeteer Christine Glanville. Montague Corri, second son, born at Edinburgh, 1784, resided successively in Newcastle, Manchester, and Liverpool. He died in London, September 19, 1849.

== Publications ==
- A Select Collection of the Most Admired Songs, Duetts, &c, Volumes I-III 1779[?], Volume IV 1795. Reprinted in C. R. F. Maunder, Domenico Corri's Treatises on Singing: A Select Collection of the Most Admired Songs, Duetts, etc. and the Singer's Preceptor : A Four-Volume Anthology. New York; London: Garland Publishing, 1995. [Volumes also include musical sources for the Select Collection & The Singer's Preceptor].
- A Complete Musical Grammer, 1787.
- A Musical Dictionary, 1798.
- The Art of Fingering, 1799.
- The Singer's Preceptor, or Corri's Treatise on Vocal Music. London: Chappell, 1810 or 1811. Reprinted New York/London, 1995. Reprinted in: The Porpora Tradition: Master Works of Singing. Edited by Edward Foreman, Vol. 3. Champaign, Illinois: Pro Musica Press, 1968.
- 6 Sonatas for Violin, Flute, and Harpsichord ,

== Operas ==
- La Raminga Fedele, 1770
- Alessandro nell'Indie, 1774
- The Travellers, or Music's Fascination, Drury Lane, January 22, 1806
