= Fanny Corri-Paltoni =

Italian opera singer

Fanny Corri-Paltoni (born Frances or Francesca Corri) (1791 – 13 July 1861) was a celebrated British operatic soprano active in Europe between 1818 and 1835. It was said that she possessed a voice of remarkable beauty and that she had a fine singing technique. She particularly excelled in the operas of Wolfgang Amadeus Mozart and Gioachino Rossini.

== Biography ==
Born Frances or Francesca Corri in Edinburgh in either 1791 or 1792, she was the daughter of Italian composer Natale Corri (1765–1822). Her uncle Domenico Corri (1746–1825) was an important singing master and composer in Edinburgh. Her cousin Sophia Dussek (née Corri) was a famous soprano.

Corri-Paltoni studied singing first with her father and then with Angelica Catalani and John Braham in London. She toured Continental Europe with Catalani in 1815–1816. She was committed to the King's Theatre in London between 1818 and 1820, making her professional opera debut at the theatre as the Countess in Le Nozze di Figaro on 17 January 1818. She earned rave reviews in London for her several other portrayals of Mozart heroines, including Donna Anna in Don Giovanni, Dorabella in Cosi fan tutte and the Queen of the Night in The Magic Flute. She was also a prized Matilda in Rossini's Elisabetta, regina d'Inghilterra on 30 April 1818. Another triumph came on 4 May 1820 when she sang Amenaide in the London premiere of Rossini's Tancredi. She was also a regular performer in the Philharmonic Society concerts from 1818 to 1821.

In the early to mid-1820s, Corri-Paltoni participated in several successful concert tours of Germany, Italy and Spain. While in Italy she met and married the singer Giuseppe Paltoni, after which she was billed as Fanny Corri-Paltoni. In 1824, she gave an acclaimed portrayal of Isaura in Giacomo Meyerbeer's Margherita d'Anjou at the Teatro Comunale di Bologna. On 20 April 1827 she portrayed the role of Corilla Scortichini in the world premiere of Gaetano Donizetti's Le convenienze ed inconvenienze teatrali at the Teatro Nuovo in Naples; after which she was committed to the opera house in Madrid for the remainder of that year.

On 12 January 1828, Corri-Paltoni sang in the premiere of Luigi Ricci's Ulisse in Itaca at the Teatro di San Carlo in Naples . She soon joined the roster of singer at La Scala where she was committed from 1828 to 1829. Her roles in Milan included Corilla in Francesco Gnecco's La Prova d'un opera seria, the title role in Rossini's La Cenerentola (with the famous bass Luigi Lablache), Rosa in Valentino Fioravanti's Le cantatrici villane, Lisinga in Rossini's Demetrio e Polibio, and Rosina in Rossini's The Barber of Seville.

In 1830, Corri-Paltoni toured throughout Germany. In 1834, she appeared in the world premiere of Saverio Mercadante's Uggero il danese at the Teatro Riccardi in Bergamo. Her last known appearance was as Adalgisa in a performance of Bellini's Norma at Alessandria in 1835. After this point no information is available about her or her husband.

On the Manchester Rate Books, 1840s–1850s Giuseppe was using the name "Joseph Paltoni". Appear on 1851 England, Wales & Scotland Census, address Grosvenor Street, Manchester, Chorlton, Lancashire, England. Three children, Fanny also a singer born in Italy 1829 a son Ullriches, born Manchester in 1837 and Giuseppe, born 1843. On the census in 1851 Frances Corri-Paltoni has occupation as "Professor of Singing" and Giuseppe as a "Singer".

Corri-Paltoni had three children with Giuseppe, who died in Chorlton in 1856. She died in 1861 in Barton upon Irwell, Lancashire after a six-month illness.
