= Tina Corri =

Italian opera singer and performer

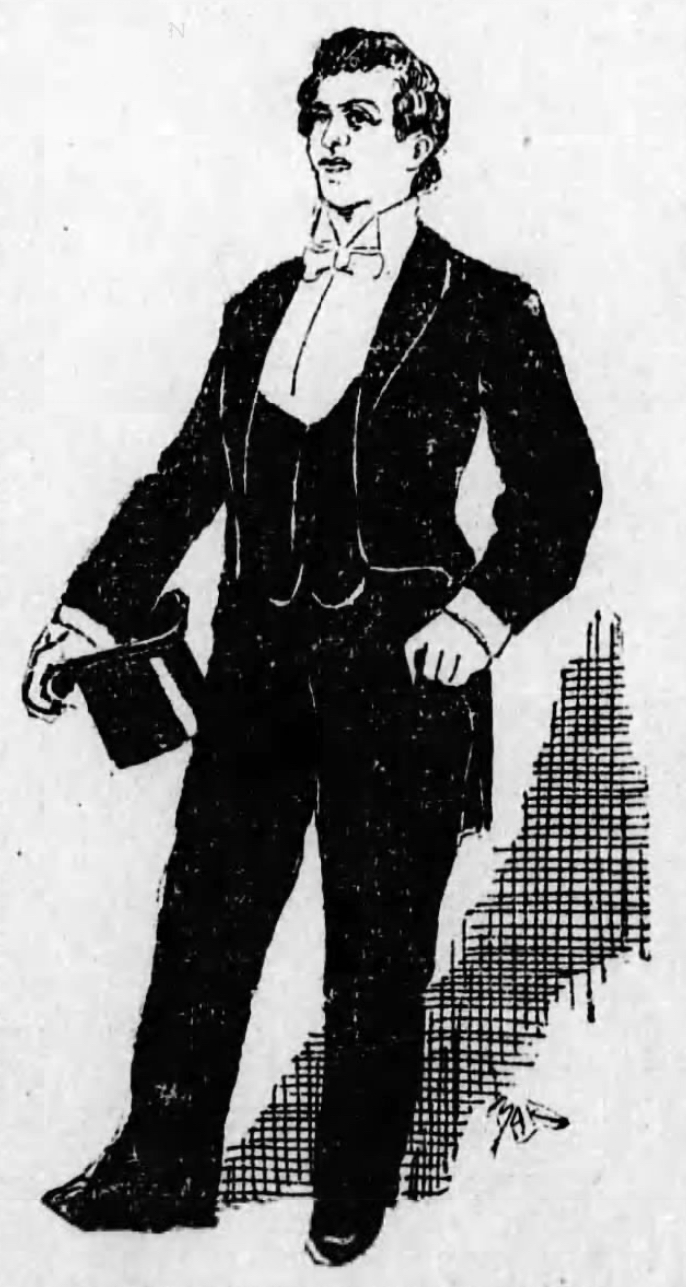
- Corri, from the Los Angeles Herald dated February 23, 1896
- Born: Annie Clementina Corri; March 11, 1885; Dublin, Ireland
- Died: May 3, 1930 (aged 65); Atlanta, Georgia, US
- Occupations: opera singer and actress
- Spouse: Walter Stanton (m. 1885, divorced)
- Children: Val Stanton; Ernie Stanton
- Parents: Valentine Corri; Annie Parker Wilson

Annie Clementina Corri Burch (March 11, 1865 - May 3, 1930), known professionally as Tina Corri, was an Italian actress and singer. She was also the mother of vaudevillian's Val Stanton and Ernie Stanton.

== Acting career ==
She made her performing debut at the age of 7 with Mademoiselle Beatrice at the Drury Lane Theatre in London. Her first appearance in a news article was in 1887 as Miss Clem Tina Corri; which featured her assisting her husband, Walter Stanton in his act. They both collaborated acts most of the time.

Tina was known for her deep singing voice. She sometimes appeared as a male impersonator. In the 1890s she was usually described as "The vivacious little soubrette"

Around 1895, she started a new act featuring her oldest son, Val who was around 9 at the time called "Tina and Val Corri" which they continued after immigrating to the United States to Chicago in 1898.

Also around that time she joined the Tony Pastor Company; and remained a member for several years.

She eventually retired from her stage work in the mid 1910s.

== Early life ==
She was born on March 11, 1865 in Dublin, Ireland to Valentine Corri, a landscape painter, drawing teacher, and also an exhibitor at the Royal Hibernian Academy in Dublin, and Annie Wilson (better known as Annie Parker) who was an actress in the stock company of the Queen's Theatre also in Dublin. She also had 6 other siblings.

== Personal life ==
She married actor Walter Stanton on October 15, 1885 in Liverpool, England and had two children, Valentine and Ernest. They later became known professionally as Val and Ernie Stanton who were both actors and athletes.

Walter and Tina divorced around 1928.

After Val's wife died in 1920; Tina had to help mostly raise their oldest daughter, Doris who was 5 at the time since Val was always away.

Tina died on May 3, 1930 in Atlanta, Georgia. She was buried at Westview Cemetery.

== Family ==
She was born into the famous Corri family of singers and musicians. Besides her husband, Walter; her sons, Val and Ernie and her parents; Valentine and Annie, she had many famous ancestors.

Her cousin, Eugene Corri was a famous boxing referee. Her grandfather, Haydn Corri was a famous organist; his father, Domenico Corri was a famous Italian composer, and many more in the family.
