= Walter Plimmer Sr. =

English theatrical producer, owner, and agent (1869-1944)

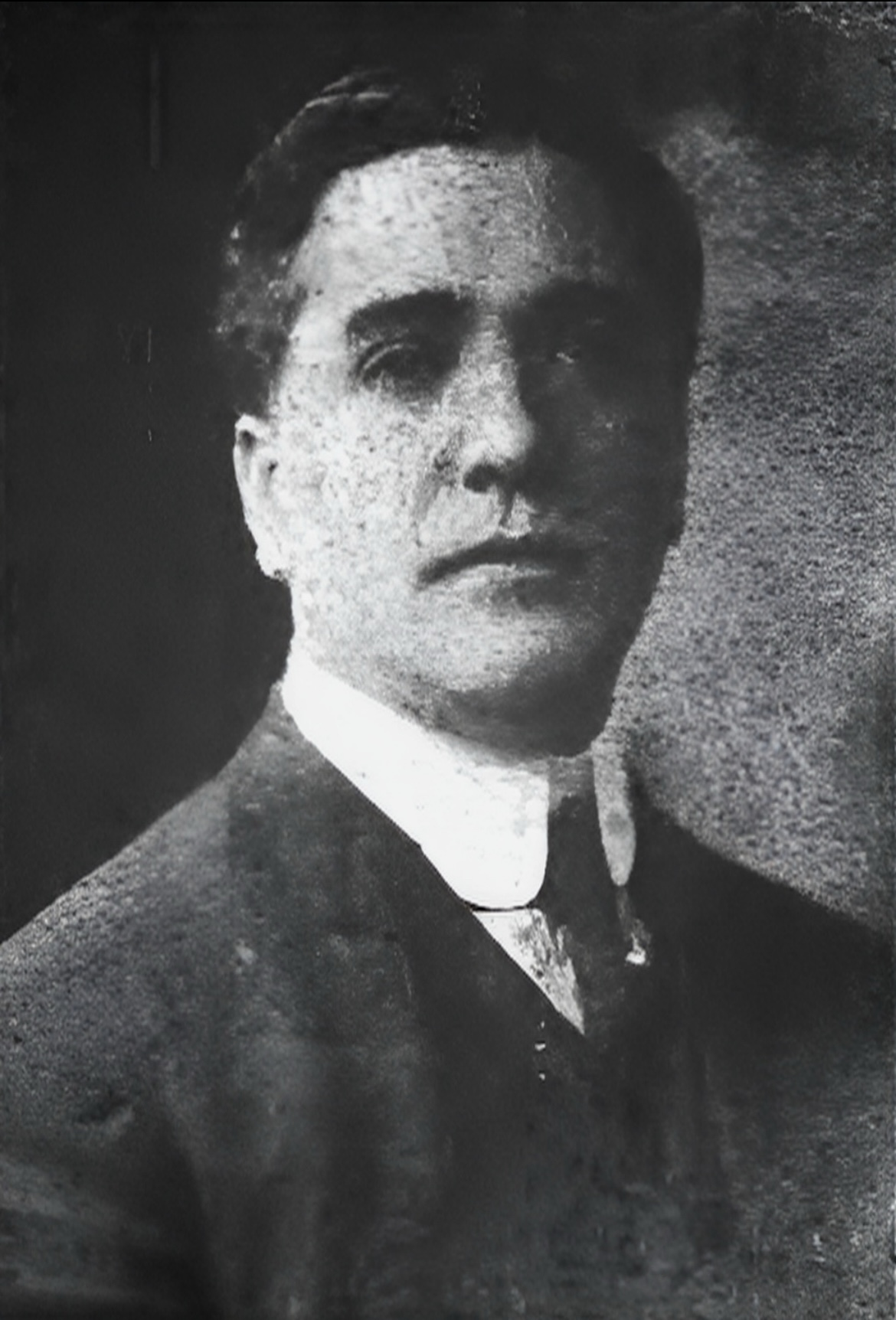
- Born: Walter John Plimmer; March , 1869; Birmingham, UK
- Died: August 27, 1944 (aged 75); Lexington, Kentucky, US
- Occupations: theatrical producer and agent
- Spouse: Rose Linden (m. 1900; died 1929)
- Relatives: Walter Plimmer Jr. (son)

Walter John Plimmer Sr. (March 1869 - August 27, 1944) was an English theatrical producer, owner, and agent. He owned his own theatrical agency.

== Early life ==
Walter Plimmer Sr. was born in March 1869 in Birmingham, England and came to the United States as a young man around 1884.

== Theater career ==
After immigrating to the U.S. he established the Walter Plimmer theatrical agency with having offices in both New York and Chicago. He would stage many plays and musical reviews, including the comedy, “Put and Take”.

He was also a pioneer in the talking picture field. He was one of the only organizers of the Vocafilm company in New York.

He was an associate of Counihan and Shannon theater magnates when they were located in Plainfield, New Jersey. He also founded the “Family Department” of the Keith Circuit and produced many of the plays. He had them located in Dunellen, New Jersey and Bound Brook. He also produced plays for the London stage and on Broadway. At one time he was the largest independent operator of a chain theater in New York. Also in his lifetime, he was the manager of the Opera House of New Brunswick, NJ. He was able to work with such stars as Ben Bernie, George M. Cohan, Al Jolson, Jack Benny, Pat O’Brien, and many more. He did it until his retirement in 1934.

== Personal life ==
He married actress Rose Ann McDade on November 16, 1900, and had three children during their marriage, Walter Jr., Helen, and Katherine Plimmer.

He would live in Brooklyn until 1930, when he retired and moved to his winter home in Fort Lauderdale, Florida.

He eventually moved in with his youngest daughter to Lexington, Kentucky in 1940. He would live there until his death on August 27, 1944, after a long illness.
