= Walter Plimmer Jr. =

American vaudeville actor, performer, and priest (1900-1968)

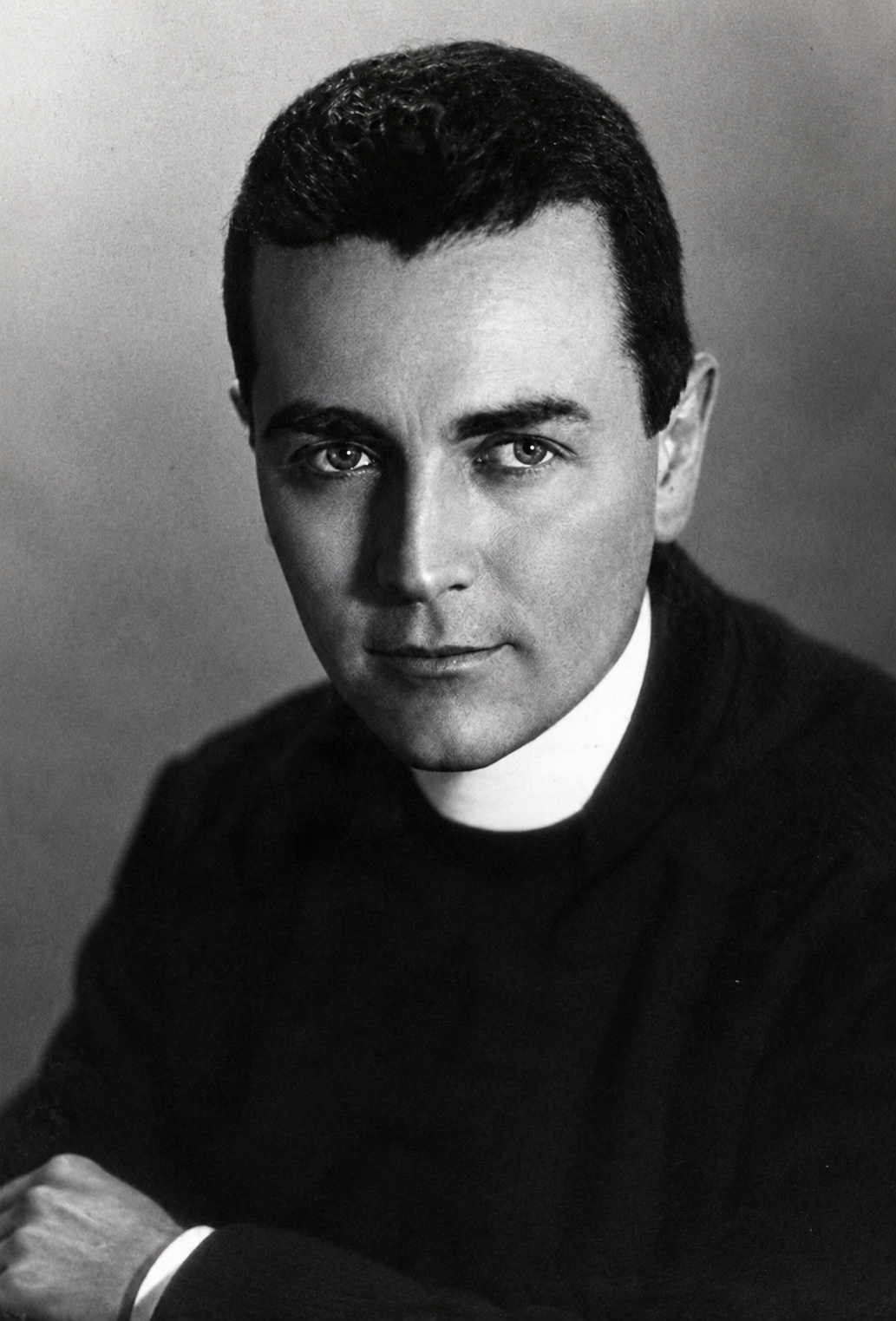
- Born: Walter John Plimmer Jr. November 22, 1900; Brooklyn, NY
- Died: September 16, 1968 (aged 67); Lexington, Kentucky, US
- Occupations: actor and priest
- Known for: Isn't Life Wonderful (1924)
- Parents: Walter Plimmer Sr.; Rose Linden

Walter John Plimmer Jr. (November 22, 1900 - September 16, 1968) was an American vaudeville actor, performer, and priest.

== Early life ==
Plimmer was born on November 22, 1900, in Brooklyn, New York to theatrical producer, Walter Plimmer Sr. and actress Rose Linden. He was the oldest of three children.

== Broadway career ==
As he was raised in the broadway business as a young boy, he spent 8 years total in the business. He appeared in many musical comedy productions. He appeared in The Gorilla, Ten Per Cent, Murray Hill, and the Hometowners which were all filmed in New York. Some of those other actors he played with consisted of George M. Cohan, John Boles, Pat O’Brien, Miriam Hopkins, Eddie Dowling, Fred Allen and many more. He was also mostly in romantic plays in New York.

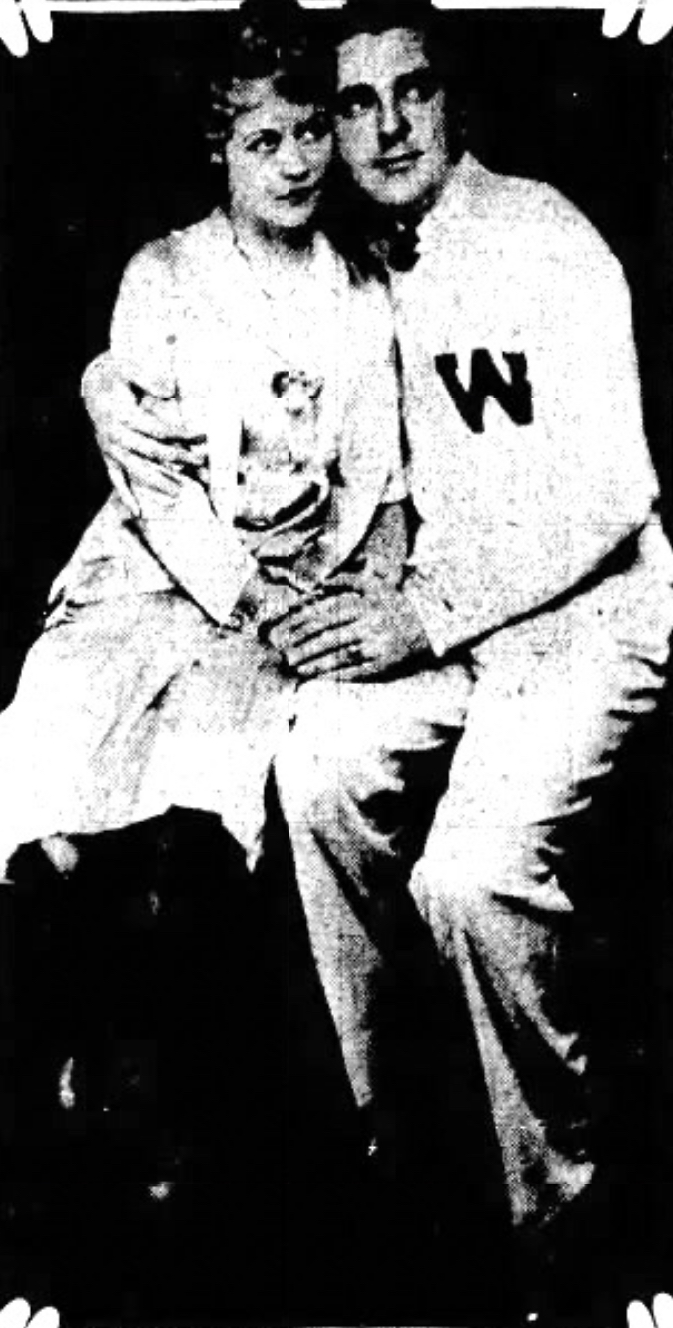
Walter Plimmer Jr. and Florence Hedges in “Hello Yourself”

His only recorded film role was in Isn't Life Wonderful (1924) as the American.

In the 1920s he would mostly go to Birmingham to act. Once he had to return home in 1929 to attend his mother’s funeral during one of his shows.

== Priestly life ==
After he concluded his acting career, he became a Roman Catholic priest and was ordained on May 26, 1934. He attended Army-Navy Prep school in Washington D.C. and was a graduate from St. Francis College in Brooklyn. His first ever Mass was at St. Malachy’s, the actor’s chapel which was located in Manhattan. In 1943, the official directory listed Plimmer as a U.S. Army Chaplain and noted the "S.S." designation, showing he belonged to the Society of St. Sulpice.

In 1944, he received an assignment within a Diocese of Trenton and served at St. Mary's Seminary in Baltimore in 1946 for only a year. He even officiated his father’s funeral in August 1944.

A couple years later, he appeared as a priest of the Diocese of Steubenville, Ohio indicating he had left his religious order. Plimmer was suspended in ministry in 1956.

He later did missionary work in California, New Mexico and Arizona. He returned home in December 1963 to discuss publication of his autobiography, “The Taste of Ashes”. It was then he had gotten ill until his death on September 16, 1968.

== Filmography ==
- Isn't Life Wonderful (1924) as the American
